= Talbot (ward) =

Talbot was an electoral ward of Trafford covering parts of Stretford and Old Trafford.

The ward was abolished in 2004, and most of its area incorporated into the new Gorse Hill Ward.

== Councillors ==
Election	Councillor	Councillor	Councillor
1973	George Marland (Lab)	Larry Sullivan (Lab)	Cliff Cronshaw (Lab)
1975	George Marland (Lab)	Larry Sullivan (Lab)	Cliff Cronshaw (Lab)
1976	George Marland (Lab)	Larry Sullivan (Lab)	Cliff Cronshaw (Lab)
1978	George Marland (Lab)	Larry Sullivan (Lab)	Cliff Cronshaw (Lab)
1979	George Marland (Lab)	Larry Sullivan (Lab)	Cliff Cronshaw (Lab)
1980	George Marland (Lab)	Larry Sullivan (Lab)	Cliff Cronshaw (Lab)
1982	George Marland (Lab)	Larry Sullivan (Lab)	Cliff Cronshaw (Lab)
1983	George Marland (Lab)	Larry Sullivan (Lab)	Cliff Cronshaw (Lab)
1984	George Marland (Lab)	Larry Sullivan (Lab)	Cliff Cronshaw (Lab)
1986	George Marland (Lab)	Larry Sullivan (Lab)	Cliff Cronshaw (Lab)
Nov 1986	George Marland (Lab)	Larry Sullivan (Lab)	Pauleen Lane (Lab)
1987	George Marland (Lab)	Larry Sullivan (Lab)	Pauleen Lane (Lab)
1988	George Marland (Lab)	Larry Sullivan (Lab)	Pauleen Lane (Lab)
1990	Beverley Hughes (Lab)	Larry Sullivan (Lab)	Pauleen Lane (Lab)
1991	Beverley Hughes (Lab)	Larry Sullivan (Lab)	Pauleen Lane (Lab)
1992	Beverley Hughes (Lab)	Alf Bates (Lab)	Pauleen Lane (Lab)
1994	Beverley Hughes (Lab)	Alf Bates (Lab)	Pauleen Lane (Lab)
1995	Beverley Hughes (Lab)	Alf Bates (Lab)	Pauleen Lane (Lab)
1996	Beverley Hughes (Lab)	Alf Bates (Lab)	Pauleen Lane (Lab)
Sep 1997	Simon Beaumont (Lab)	Alf Bates (Lab)	Pauleen Lane (Lab)
1998	Simon Beaumont (Lab)	Alf Bates (Lab)	Pauleen Lane (Lab)
1999	Simon Beaumont (Lab)	Alf Bates (Lab)	Pauleen Lane (Lab)
2000	Simon Beaumont (Lab)	Laurence Walsh (Lab)	Pauleen Lane (Lab)
2002	Simon Beaumont (Lab)	Laurence Walsh (Lab)	Pauleen Lane (Lab)
2003	Simon Beaumont (Lab)	Laurence Walsh (Lab)	Pauleen Lane (Lab)

== Elections in the 2000s ==
2003
Party	Candidate	Votes	%	±%
Labour	Pauleen Lane*	1,505	60.8	−16.4
Conservative	Colin Levenston	570	23.0	+0.2
Green	Angela Hall	401	16.2	+16.2
Majority		935	37.8	−16.6
Turnout		2,476	40.2	+2.3
Labour hold		Swing		

2002
Party	Candidate	Votes	%	±%
Labour	Simon Beaumont*	1,824	77.2	+10.6
Conservative	George Manley	538	22.8	−2.8
Majority		1,286	54.4	+13.4
Turnout		2,362	37.9	+16.4
Labour hold		Swing		

2000
Party	Candidate	Votes	%	±%
Labour	Laurence Walsh	906	66.6	−9.7
Conservative	Colin Levenston	349	25.6	+7.6
Liberal Democrats	Hazel Shacklock	106	7.8	+2.1
Majority		557	41.0	−17.3
Turnout		1,361	21.5	−0.3
Labour hold		Swing		

== Elections in the 1990s ==
1999
Party	Candidate	Votes	%	±%
Labour	Lane*	1,038	76.3	+4.0
Conservative	Levenston	245	18.0	−9.7
Liberal Democrats	Shacklock	77	5.7	+5.7
Majority		793	58.3	+13.7
Turnout		1,360	21.8	+0.9
Labour hold		Swing		

1998
Party	Candidate	Votes	%	±%
Labour	S. Beaumont*	944	72.3	−4.0
Conservative	S. M. Dirikis	361	27.7	+5.5
Majority		583	44.6	−9.5
Turnout		1,305	20.9	−7.1
Labour hold		Swing		

By-Election 18 September 1997
Party	Candidate	Votes	%	±%
Labour	S. A. Beaumont	935	81.8	+5.5
Conservative	M. Ali	144	12.6	−9.6
Liberal Democrats	F. C. Beswick	64	5.6	+5.6
Majority		791	69.2	+15.1
Turnout		1,143	17.9	−10.1
Labour hold		Swing		

1996
Party	Candidate	Votes	%	±%
Labour	A. Bates*	1,312	76.3	−1.9
Conservative	C. J. Levenston	381	22.2	+2.0
Independent	K. J. Martin	27	1.6	+0.1
Majority		931	54.1	−3.9
Turnout		1,720	28.0	−5.5
Labour hold		Swing		

1995
Party	Candidate	Votes	%	±%
Labour	P. A. Lane*	1,642	78.2	+0.6
Conservative	C. J. Levenston	425	20.2	−2.2
Independent	K. J. Martin	32	1.5	+1.5
Majority		1,217	58.0	+2.9
Turnout		2,099	33.5	−1.9
Labour hold		Swing		

1994
Party	Candidate	Votes	%	±%
Labour	B. J. Hughes*	1,779	77.6	+14.4
Conservative	C. J. Levenston	515	22.4	−10.9
Majority		1,264	55.1	+25.1
Turnout		2,294	35.4	+6.3
Labour hold		Swing		

1992
Party	Candidate	Votes	%	±%
Labour	A. Bates	1,235	63.2	−5.9
Conservative	C. J. Levenston	650	33.3	+2.4
Green	J. H. Piprani	47	2.4	+2.4
Independent	K. J. Martin	21	1.1	+1.1
Majority		585	30.0	−8.1
Turnout		1,953	29.1	−8.1
Labour hold		Swing		

1991
Party	Candidate	Votes	%	±%
Labour	P. A. Lane*	1,731	69.1	−3.5
Conservative	C. J. Levenston	775	30.9	+10.2
Majority		956	38.1	−13.8
Turnout		2,506	37.2	−3.1
Labour hold		Swing		

1990
Party	Candidate	Votes	%	±%
Labour	B. J. Hughes	2,026	72.6	+1.8
Conservative	C. J. Levenston	578	20.7	−8.5
Green	D. Glazier	187	6.7	+6.7
Majority		1,448	51.9	+10.2
Turnout		2,791	40.3	+5.5
Labour hold		Swing		

== Elections in the 1980s ==
1988
Party	Candidate	Votes	%	±%
Labour	D. F. Sullivan*	1,775	70.8	+9.1
Conservative	C. J. Levenston	731	29.2	−6.9
Majority		1,044	41.7	+16.1
Turnout		2,506	34.8	−5.0
Labour hold		Swing		

1987
Party	Candidate	Votes	%	±%
Labour	P. A. Lane*	1,760	61.7	−5.5
Conservative	C. J. Levenston	1,030	36.1	+13.4
Independent	K. J. Martin	61	2.1	+1.6
Majority		730	25.6	−18.9
Turnout		2,851	39.8	+3.6
Labour hold		Swing		

By-Election 6 November 1986
Party	Candidate	Votes	%	±%
Labour	P. A. Lane	1,209	68.3	+1.1
Conservative	C. J. Levenston	562	31.7	+9.0
Majority		647	36.5	−8.0
Turnout		1,771	24.3	−11.9
Labour hold		Swing		

1986
Party	Candidate	Votes	%	±%
Labour	G. Marland*	1,775	67.2	−0.4
Conservative	C. J. Levenston	600	22.7	−6.2
SDP	K. Clarke	252	9.5	+9.5
Independent	K. J. Martin	13	0.5	−3.0
Majority		1,175	44.5	+5.9
Turnout		2,640	36.2	+1.0
Labour hold		Swing		

1984
Party	Candidate	Votes	%	±%
Labour	D. L. Sullivan*	1,744	67.6	+5.5
Conservative	C. J. Levenston	747	28.9	+2.6
Independent	K. J. Martin	90	3.5	+3.5
Majority		997	38.6	+2.8
Turnout		2,581	35.2	−4.4
Labour hold		Swing		

1983
Party	Candidate	Votes	%	±%
Labour	H. C. Cronshaw*	1,843	62.1	+3.5
Conservative	S. M. Dirikis	781	26.3	+0.8
Alliance	R. J. Allan	346	11.6	−4.3
Majority		1,062	35.8	+2.8
Turnout		2,970	39.6	+0.6
Labour hold		Swing		

1982
Party	Candidate	Votes	%	±%
Labour	G. Marland*	1,721	58.6	−15.8
Conservative	B. M. Dirikis	750	25.5	−0.1
SDP	S. Everett	467	15.9	+15.9
Majority		971	33.0	−15.8
Turnout		2,938	39.0	−0.1
Labour hold		Swing		

1980
Party	Candidate	Votes	%	±%
Labour	D. F. Sullivan*	2,192	74.4	+17.9
Conservative	B. M. Dirikis	754	25.6	−9.3
Majority		1,438	48.8	+27.3
Turnout		2,946	39.1	−29.9
Labour hold		Swing		

== Elections in the 1970s ==
1979
Party	Candidate	Votes	%	±%
Labour	H. C. Cronshaw*	3,339	56.5	−5.0
Conservative	J. R. Gregory	2,065	34.9	−3.6
Liberal	W. A. Munden	509	8.6	+8.6
Majority		1,274	21.5	−1.6
Turnout		5,913	69.0	+35.7
Labour hold		Swing		

1978
Party	Candidate	Votes	%	±%
Labour	G. Marland*	1,780	61.5	+8.7
Conservative	W. Outhwaite	1,113	38.5	+4.7
Majority		667	23.1	+4.1
Turnout		2,893	33.3	−4.6
Labour hold		Swing		

1976
Party	Candidate	Votes	%	±%
Labour	D. F. Sullivan*	1,786	52.8	+7.2
Conservative	T. W. Thompson	1,143	33.8	+3.0
Liberal	T. A. Dixon	451	13.3	−10.3
Majority		643	19.0	+4.2
Turnout		3,380	37.9	+3.0
Labour hold		Swing		

1975
Party	Candidate	Votes	%	±%
Labour	H. C. Cronshaw*	1,406	45.6	
Conservative	E. J. Kelson	950	30.8	
Liberal	T. A. Dixon	729	23.6	
Majority		456	14.8	
Turnout		3,085	34.9	
Labour hold		Swing		

1973
Party	Candidate	Votes	%	±%
Labour	G. Marland	1,755	60.5	
Labour	D. F. Sullivan	1,715		
Labour	H. C. Cronshaw	1,694		
Conservative	J. Schofield	956	33.0	
Conservative	F. Warbrick	905		
Conservative	G. Miles	843		
Communist	A. Ironmonger	190	6.5	
Majority		738		
Turnout		2,901	30.1	
Labour win (new seat)				
Labour win (new seat)				
Labour win (new seat)				
