= 1994 Trafford Metropolitan Borough Council election =

1994 UK local government election

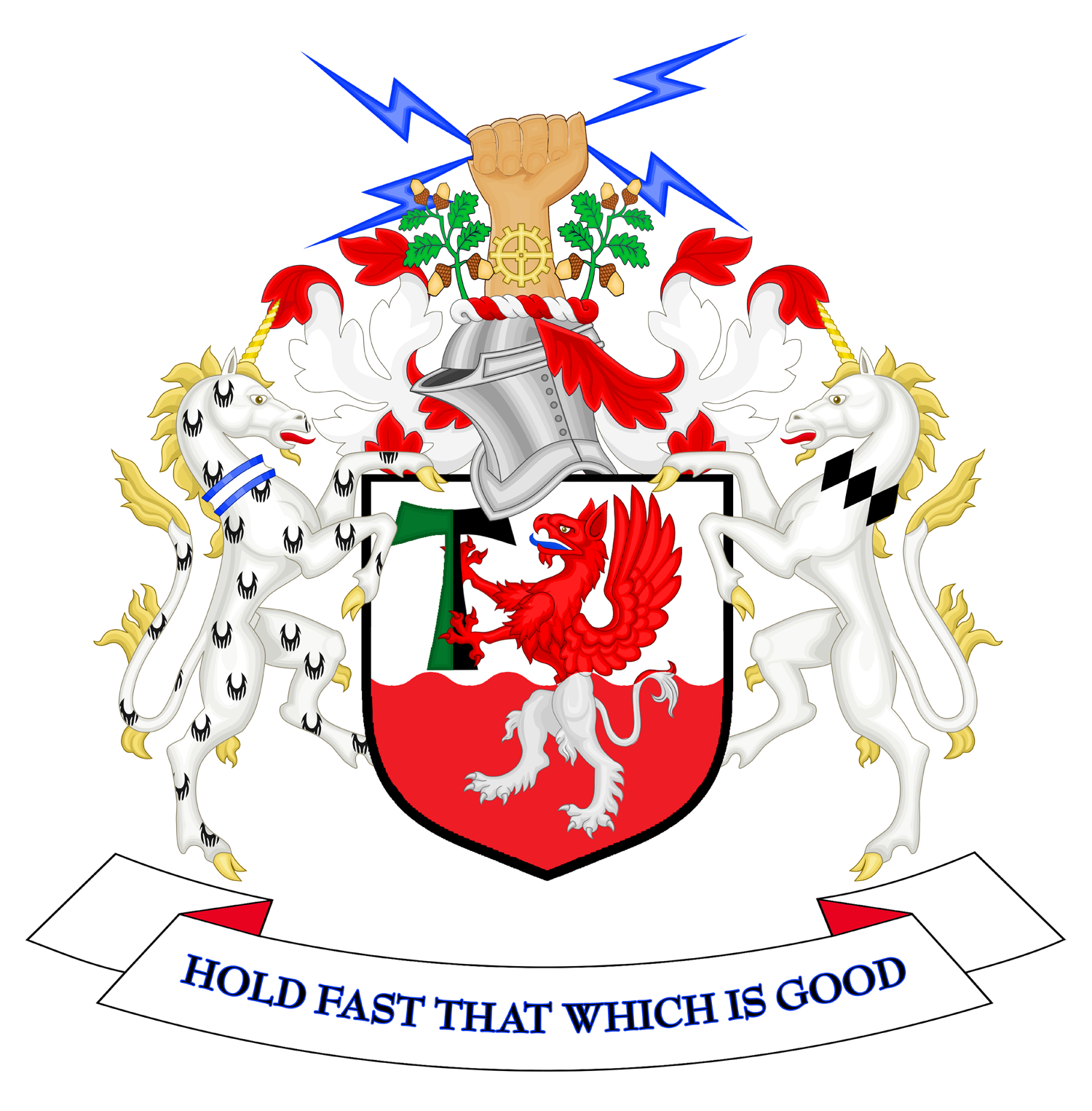
- 5 May 1994

21 of 63 seats to Trafford Metropolitan Borough Council 32 seats needed for a majority
	First party	Second party	Third party
Leader	Frank Eadie	Beverley Hughes	Ray Bowker
Party	Conservative	Labour	Liberal Democrats
Leader's seat	Davyhulme East	Talbot	Village
Last election	17 seats, 53.4%	4 seats, 30.5%	1 seats, 15.3%
Seats before	37	22	4
Seats won	8	11	2
Seats after	35	23	5
Seat change	▼2	▲1	▲1
Popular vote	28,764	30,896	15,648
Percentage	38.1%	41.0%	20.7%
Swing	▼15.3%	▲10.5%	▲5.4%
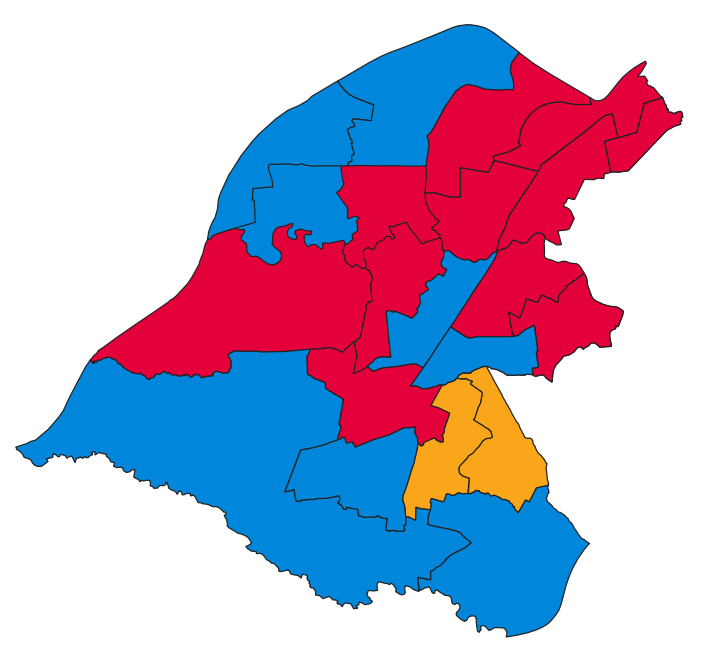
- Map of results of 1994 election
Leader of the Council before election
Frank Eadie
Conservative
Leader of the Council after election
Frank Eadie
Conservative

Elections to Trafford Council were held on 5 May 1994. One-third of the council was up for election, with each successful candidate to serve a four-year term of office, expiring in 1998. The Conservative party retained overall control of the council.

== Election result ==
Party	Votes		Seats			Full Council	
Conservative Party	28,764 (38.1%)	▼15.3	8 (42.9%)	8 / 21	▼2	35 (55.6%)	35 / 63
Labour Party	30,896 (41.0%)	▲10.5	11 (52.4%)	11 / 21	▲1	23 (36.5%)	23 / 63
Liberal Democrats	15,648 (20.7%)	▲5.4	2 (9.5%)	2 / 21	▲1	5 (7.9%)	5 / 63
Green Party	134 (0.2%)	▼0.5	0 (0.0%)	0 / 21	Steady	0 (0.0%)	0 / 63

↓
23	5	35

== Ward results ==
=== Altrincham ===
Altrincham
Party	Candidate	Votes	%	±%
Conservative	R. A. Mrozinski	1,642	43.5	−14.7
Labour	J. Torpey	1,573	41.6	+13.1
Liberal Democrats	K. Clarke	564	14.9	+4.5
Majority		69	1.8	−27.9
Turnout		3,779	43.4	+2.6
Conservative hold		Swing		

=== Bowdon ===
Bowdon
Party	Candidate	Votes	%	±%
Conservative	M. C. Harney*	2,018	52.1	−21.6
Liberal Democrats	N. S. Harrison	1,046	27.0	+12.0
Labour	H. F. Busteed	809	20.9	+9.6
Majority		972	25.1	−33.6
Turnout		3,873	41.4	+1.6
Conservative hold		Swing		

=== Broadheath ===
Broadheath
Party	Candidate	Votes	%	±%
Labour	J. E. Baugh*	2,068	49.1	+17.2
Conservative	L. Leggett	1,522	36.1	−18.7
Liberal Democrats	B. C. Lynch	623	14.8	+1.5
Majority		546	13.0	−9.9
Turnout		4,213	47.0	+6.0
Labour hold		Swing		

=== Brooklands ===
Brooklands
Party	Candidate	Votes	%	±%
Conservative	R. Barber	1,736	48.4	−20.1
Liberal Democrats	A. Rhodes	1,095	30.5	+14.2
Labour	T. G. Crewe	754	21.0	+7.9
Majority		641	17.9	−33.7
Turnout		3,585	45.3	−6.3
Conservative hold		Swing		

=== Bucklow ===
Bucklow
Party	Candidate	Votes	%	±%
Labour	S. M. Batty	1,368	55.2	−13.7
Liberal Democrats	F. Holland*	1,111	44.8	+13.7
Majority		257	10.4	−27.5
Turnout		2,479	39.0	+10.0
Labour gain from Liberal Democrats		Swing		

=== Clifford ===
Clifford
Party	Candidate	Votes	%	±%
Labour	P. W. Mitchell	1,879	76.8	+14.7
Conservative	J. M. Ansari	434	17.7	−14.5
Green	D. W. Alexander	134	5.5	−0.2
Majority		1,445	59.1	+29.2
Turnout		2,447	31.1	+4.2
Labour hold		Swing		

=== Davyhulme East ===
Davyhulme East
Party	Candidate	Votes	%	±%
Conservative	E. R. Eadie	1,888	52.5	−14.2
Labour	S. Hesford	1,401	39.0	+11.9
Liberal Democrats	F. A. Cameron	305	8.5	+2.3
Majority		487	13.6	−26.1
Turnout		3,594	48.5	+7.9
Conservative hold		Swing		

=== Davyhulme West ===
Davyhulme West
Party	Candidate	Votes	%	±%
Conservative	M. Bates*	1,653	45.7	−10.9
Labour	A. Stringer	1,578	43.6	+5.8
Liberal Democrats	D. M. Browne	388	10.7	+5.2
Majority		75	2.1	−16.7
Turnout		3,619	45.9	+2.7
Conservative hold		Swing		

=== Flixton ===
Flixton
Party	Candidate	Votes	%	±%
Conservative	T. R. Seddon*	1,625	40.8	−11.4
Labour	J. D. Chapman-Barker	1,238	31.1	+6.5
Liberal Democrats	A. Vernon	1,115	28.0	+4.8
Majority		387	9.7	−18.0
Turnout		3,978	53.7	+5.1
Conservative hold		Swing		

=== Hale ===
Hale
Party	Candidate	Votes	%	±%
Conservative	M. Lucas	2,015	51.0	−18.9
Liberal Democrats	C. S. Fink	1,528	38.7	+15.6
Labour	R. E. Lucas	409	10.3	+3.3
Majority		487	12.3	−34.5
Turnout		3,952	46.2	+3.5
Conservative hold		Swing		

=== Longford ===
Longford
Party	Candidate	Votes	%	±%
Labour	J. P. Hagan*	1,779	56.1	+12.7
Conservative	E. J. Kelson	1,137	35.9	−17.7
Liberal Democrats	C. R. Walmsley	253	8.0	+8.0
Majority		642	20.3	+10.2
Turnout		3,169	42.9	+2.0
Labour hold		Swing		

=== Mersey-St. Mary's ===
Mersey St. Marys
Party	Candidate	Votes	%	±%
Conservative	B. D. Rigby	2,193	49.0	−20.6
Labour	A. Guttridge	1,303	29.1	+9.4
Liberal Democrats	R. M. Elliott	975	21.8	+11.1
Majority		890	19.9	−30.0
Turnout		4,471	47.4	+5.4
Conservative hold		Swing		

=== Park ===
Park
Party	Candidate	Votes	%	±%
Labour	J. R. Haydock*	1,415	58.8	+11.4
Conservative	C. H. Davenport	772	32.1	−14.0
Liberal Democrats	S. O. Bowater	218	9.1	+2.5
Majority		643	26.7	+25.4
Turnout		2,405	40.6	+6.6
Labour hold		Swing		

=== Priory ===
Priory
Party	Candidate	Votes	%	±%
Labour	B. Brotherton	1,454	37.3	+11.1
Liberal Democrats	C. Smith	1,267	32.5	+2.3
Conservative	R. C. Heads	1,181	30.3	−13.3
Majority		187	4.8	−8.7
Turnout		3,902	50.4	+3.4
Labour hold		Swing		

=== Sale Moor ===
Sale Moor
Party	Candidate	Votes	%	±%
Labour	P. Gratrix*	1,697	46.2	+6.8
Conservative	C. J. J. Lynch	1,403	38.2	−5.9
Liberal Democrats	M. E. Clarke	572	15.6	−0.9
Majority		294	8.0	+3.3
Turnout		3,672	48.0	+5.8
Labour hold		Swing		

=== St. Martin's ===
St. Martins
Party	Candidate	Votes	%	±%
Labour	L. T. Murkin*	2,232	57.5	+11.9
Conservative	J. Nicholas	1,247	32.1	−15.4
Liberal Democrats	T. J. P. Corbett	402	10.4	+3.4
Majority		1,016	26.2	+24.3
Turnout		3,881	43.6	+7.0
Labour hold		Swing		

=== Stretford ===
Stretford
Party	Candidate	Votes	%	±%
Labour	S. A. Adshead*	2,105	58.0	+15.3
Conservative	J. T. Kelly	1,207	33.3	−19.9
Liberal Democrats	J. M. Walmsley	316	8.7	+5.5
Majority		898	24.8	+14.3
Turnout		3,628	46.6	−1.8
Labour hold		Swing		

=== Talbot ===
Talbot
Party	Candidate	Votes	%	±%
Labour	B. J. Hughes*	1,779	77.6	+14.4
Conservative	C. J. Levenston	515	22.4	−10.9
Majority		1,264	55.1	+25.1
Turnout		2,294	35.4	+6.3
Labour hold		Swing		

=== Timperley ===
Timperley
Party	Candidate	Votes	%	±%
Liberal Democrats	D. C. R. Horstead	1,684	40.0	+13.2
Conservative	P. A. Dixon*	1,610	38.3	−17.6
Labour	A. D. McNee	912	21.7	+4.4
Majority		74	1.8	−27.3
Turnout		4,206	48.3	+6.3
Liberal Democrats gain from Conservative		Swing		

=== Urmston ===
Urmston
Party	Candidate	Votes	%	±%
Labour	D. Acton*	2,244	60.6	+20.2
Conservative	A. Smith	1,461	39.4	−16.3
Majority		783	21.1	+5.8
Turnout		3,705	49.8	+2.3
Labour hold		Swing		

=== Village ===
Village
Party	Candidate	Votes	%	±%
Liberal Democrats	J. E. Brophy	2,186	47.6	−0.9
Conservative	A. Bowker*	1,505	32.8	+0.6
Labour	S. N. Humby	899	19.6	+0.3
Majority		681	14.8	−1.5
Turnout		4,590	49.5	+1.8
Liberal Democrats gain from Conservative		Swing		
