= 1986 Trafford Metropolitan Borough Council election =

1986 UK local government election

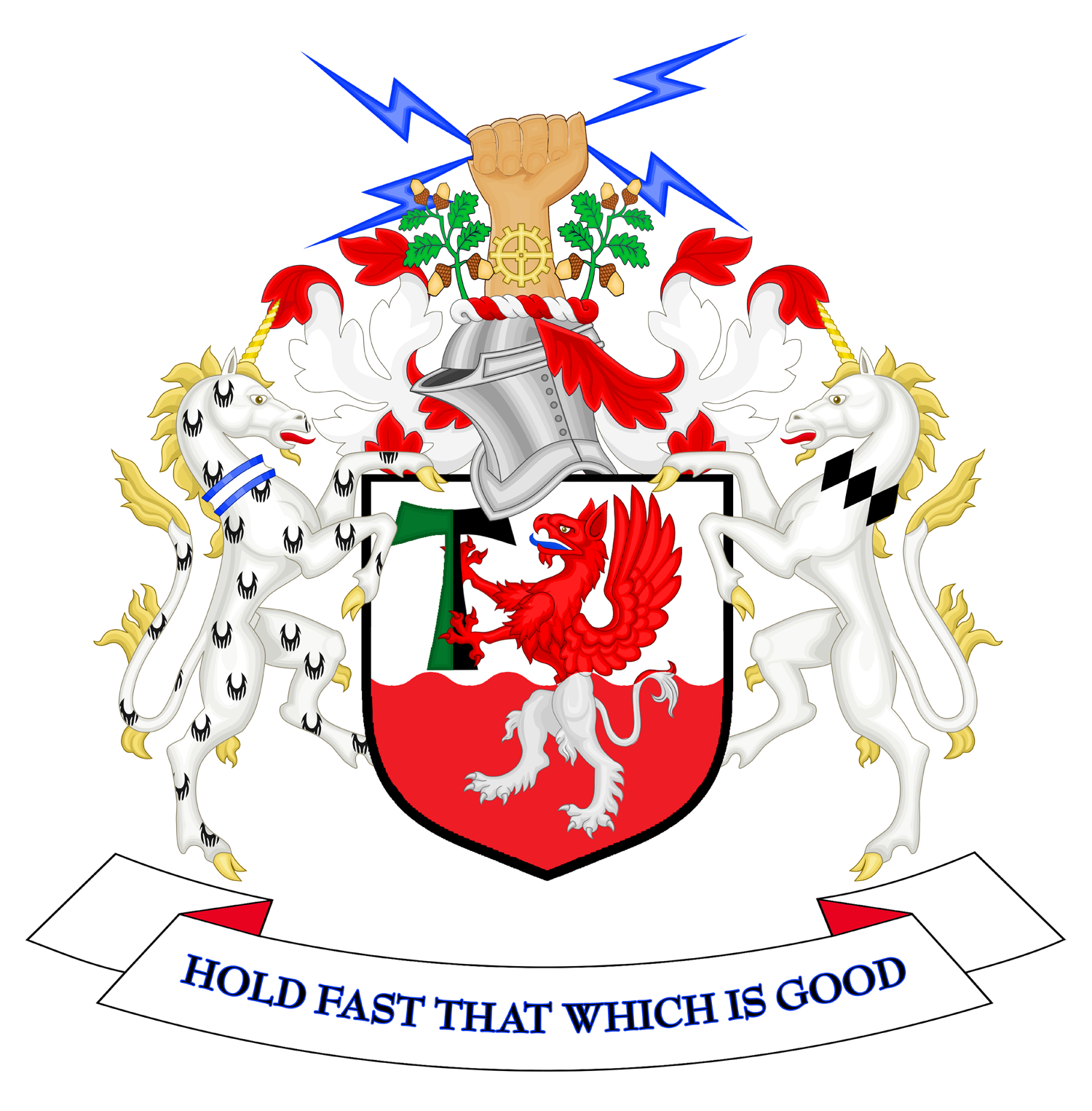
- 8 May 1986

23 of 63 seats to Trafford Metropolitan Borough Council 32 seats needed for a majority
	First party	Second party	Third party
Leader	Barry Brotherton	Colin Warbrick	John Golding
Party	Labour	Conservative	Alliance
Leader's seat	Sale Moor	Urmston	Priory
Last election	6 seats, 35.7%	9 seats, 42.2%	4 seats, 20.3%
Seats before	21	34	8
Seats won	14	6	3
Seats after	30	24	9
Seat change	▲9	▼10	▲1
Popular vote	31,703	30,087	17,808
Percentage	39.6%	37.6%	22.3%
Swing	▲3.9%	▼4.6%	▲2.0%
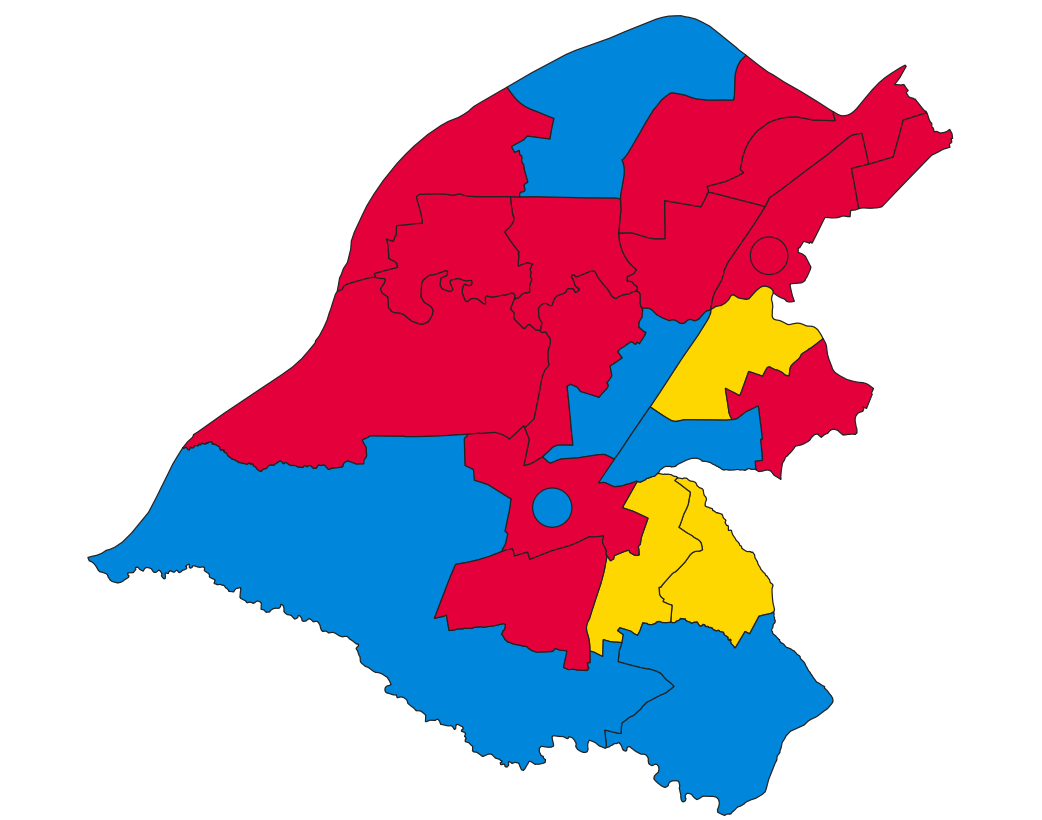
- Map of results of 1986 election
Leader of the Council before election
Colin Warbrick
Conservative
Leader of the Council after election
Barry Brotherton
Labour

Elections to Trafford Council were held on 8 May 1986. One third of the council was up for election, with each successful candidate to serve a four-year term of office, expiring in 1990. The Conservative Party lost overall control of the council, to no overall control.

Because the Conservative Candidate for Priory ward, G. V. Burrows, (presumably inadvertently) wrote his occupation in the description box of his nomination paper, his party allegiance is listed on all official records and press coverage of this election as "Taxi Driver". However, as he was, in fact, the official Conservative Candidate, and therefore would doubtless have taken the Conservative whip had he been elected, he is listed on this page as a Conservative, rather than an Independent.

== Election result ==
Party	Votes		Seats			Full Council	
Labour Party	31,703 (39.6%)	▲3.9	14 (60.9%)	14 / 23	▲9	30 (47.6%)	30 / 63
Conservative Party	30,087 (37.6%)	▼4.6	6 (26.1%)	6 / 23	▼10	24 (38.1%)	24 / 63
Alliance	17,808 (22.3%)	▲2.0	3 (13.0%)	3 / 23	▲1	9 (14.3%)	9 / 63
Green Party	358 (0.4%)	▼0.3	0 (0.0%)	0 / 23	Steady	0 (0.0%)	0 / 63
Independent	13 (0.0%)	▼1.1	0 (0.0%)	0 / 23	Steady	0 (0.0%)	0 / 63

↓
30	9	24

== Ward results ==
=== Altrincham ===
Altrincham
Party	Candidate	Votes	%	±%
Labour	S. M. Evans	1,523	41.1	+2.3
Conservative	B. L. Slater*	1,352	36.4	−7.2
SDP	Barbara M. Keeley-Huggett	725	19.5	+19.5
Green	N. J. Eadie	110	3.0	+1.4
Majority		171	4.6	−0.2
Turnout		3,710	46.1	+3.9
Labour gain from Conservative		Swing		

=== Bowdon ===
Bowdon
Party	Candidate	Votes	%	±%
Conservative	J. B. Gill*	2,449	60.2	−12.9
SDP	V. G. O'Hara	1,026	25.2	+25.2
Labour	M. J. Hendrickson	434	10.7	−6.2
Green	M. R. Rowtham	160	3.9	−6.1
Majority		1,423	35.0	−21.1
Turnout		4,069	44.9	−11.2
Conservative hold		Swing		

=== Broadheath ===
Broadheath (2 vacancies)
Party	Candidate	Votes	%	±%
Labour	J. J. Hyland	1,387	38.9	+2.2
Conservative	M. J. Barltrop	1,334	37.4	−8.8
Conservative	M. G. Currie*	1,308	36.7	−9.5
Labour	J. B. Morton	1,300	36.5	−0.2
SDP	D. E. Armstrong	948	26.6	+9.5
SDP	R. C. Tweed	858	24.1	+7.0
Majority		26	0.7	−8.9
Turnout		3,565	45.9	+4.4
Labour gain from Conservative		Swing		
Conservative hold		Swing		

=== Brooklands ===
Brooklands
Party	Candidate	Votes	%	±%
Conservative	Jack Waterfall*	1,881	50.3	−1.2
Alliance	Cecil Fink	1,354	36.2	−1.0
Labour	E. D. Shaw	507	13.5	+2.2
Majority		527	14.1	−0.2
Turnout		3,742	46.0	+0.4
Conservative hold		Swing		

=== Bucklow ===
Bucklow
Party	Candidate	Votes	%	±%
Labour	Frank Holland*	1,747	80.0	+24.4
Conservative	M. E. Hindley	438	20.0	+7.2
Majority		1,309	59.9	+20.0
Turnout		2,185	31.7	−6.1
Labour hold		Swing		

=== Clifford ===
Clifford
Party	Candidate	Votes	%	±%
Labour	B. M. Sheehan	2,285	77.1	+6.1
Conservative	M. Howard	680	22.9	−6.1
Majority		1,605	54.1	+12.1
Turnout		2,965	33.5	−4.2
Labour hold		Swing		

=== Davyhulme East ===
Davyhulme East
Party	Candidate	Votes	%	±%
Conservative	R. G. Haigh*	1,812	50.2	+4.5
Labour	J. B. Roberts	1,320	36.6	+1.8
SDP	R. J. Thompson	474	13.1	+13.1
Majority		492	13.6	+2.7
Turnout		3,606	46.6	+2.9
Conservative hold		Swing		

=== Davyhulme West ===
Davyhulme West
Party	Candidate	Votes	%	±%
Labour	A. G. Hodson	1,683	42.5	−4.9
Conservative	P. Bates	1,421	35.9	−8.2
Liberal	M. E. Clarke	856	21.6	+21.6
Majority		262	6.6	+3.3
Turnout		3,960	47.2	−1.7
Labour gain from Conservative		Swing		

=== Flixton ===
Flixton
Party	Candidate	Votes	%	±%
Labour	B. J. Hughes	1,477	35.1	+11.0
Conservative	C. A. Lord*	1,432	34.1	−3.4
Liberal	P. I. M. Crompton	1,293	30.8	−7.6
Majority		45	1.1	+0.2
Turnout		4,202	52.4	+0.7
Labour gain from Conservative		Swing		

=== Hale ===
Hale
Party	Candidate	Votes	%	±%
Conservative	R. A. Roberts	2,317	57.2	−5.7
Liberal	J. H. Mulholland	1,383	34.1	+5.6
Labour	C. E. Donegan	263	6.5	+0.4
Green	J. S. Menzies	88	2.2	−0.4
Majority		934	23.1	−11.3
Turnout		4,051	45.7	+1.5
Conservative hold		Swing		

=== Longford ===
Longford (2 vacancies)
Party	Candidate	Votes	%	±%
Labour	J. P. Hagan	1,824	53.2	−1.1
Labour	P. J. Morgan	1,711	49.9	−4.4
Conservative	K. G. Summerfield*	1,292	37.7	−8.0
Conservative	E. J. Kelson	1,235	36.0	−9.7
SDP	M. L. Kugler	313	9.1	N/A
Majority		419	12.2	+3.6
Turnout		3,426	45.7	+1.4
Labour gain from Conservative		Swing		
Labour gain from Conservative		Swing		

=== Mersey-St. Mary's ===
Mersey St. Marys
Party	Candidate	Votes	%	±%
Conservative	D. I. Carter	2,155	51.7	−7.2
Liberal	A. Kelly	1,202	28.8	+4.5
Labour	P. J. English	815	19.5	+2.7
Majority		953	22.8	−11.7
Turnout		4,172	43.4	+4.3
Conservative hold		Swing		

=== Park ===
Park
Party	Candidate	Votes	%	±%
Labour	J. R. Haydock*	1,551	64.4	+9.1
Conservative	D. Meadowcroft	859	35.6	+1.0
Majority		692	28.7	+8.0
Turnout		2,410	38.3	−1.9
Labour hold		Swing		

=== Priory ===
Priory
Party	Candidate	Votes	%	±%
Liberal	Edna Mitchell	1,351	39.3	−0.4
Labour	B. K. Lund	1,161	33.8	+8.1
Conservative	G. V. Burrows	926	26.9	−7.7
Majority		190	5.5	+0.4
Turnout		3,438	42.4	+1.1
Liberal hold		Swing		

=== Sale Moor ===
Sale Moor
Party	Candidate	Votes	%	±%
Labour	Richard Mee*	1,509	48.9	+7.2
Conservative	E. A. Robinson	905	29.3	−5.7
Liberal	Hilary Hughes	671	21.8	+21.8
Majority		604	19.6	+12.8
Turnout		3,085	39.9	−2.2
Labour hold		Swing		

=== St. Martin's ===
St. Martins
Party	Candidate	Votes	%	±%
Labour	L. T. Murkin	2,243	52.1	−0.5
Conservative	M. E. King*	1,411	32.8	+1.3
Liberal	T. J. P. Corbett	654	15.2	−0.7
Majority		832	19.3	−1.8
Turnout		4,308	45.2	+2.5
Labour gain from Conservative		Swing		

=== Stretford ===
Stretford
Party	Candidate	Votes	%	±%
Labour	Stephen Adshead	1,772	48.0	+5.6
Conservative	M. Hindley*	1,483	40.2	−5.6
SDP	L. L. Sumner	437	11.8	0
Majority		289	7.8	+4.4
Turnout		3,692	45.2	+1.9
Labour gain from Conservative		Swing		

=== Talbot ===
Talbot
Party	Candidate	Votes	%	±%
Labour	G. Marland*	1,775	67.2	−0.4
Conservative	C. J. Levenston	600	22.7	−6.2
SDP	K. Clarke	252	9.5	+9.5
Independent	K. J. Martin	13	0.5	−3.0
Majority		1,175	44.5	+5.9
Turnout		2,640	36.2	+1.0
Labour hold		Swing		

=== Timperley ===
Timperley
Party	Candidate	Votes	%	±%
Liberal	Michael Farnsworth	1,628	41.2	−3.9
Conservative	Ken Davies*	1,534	38.8	+3.3
Labour	A. D. McNee	792	20.0	+0.5
Majority		94	2.4	−7.2
Turnout		3,954	44.2	+5.1
Liberal gain from Conservative		Swing		

=== Urmston ===
Urmston
Party	Candidate	Votes	%	±%
Labour	J. G. Hanrahan	1,572	43.2	+3.9
Conservative	A. R. Coupe*	1,467	40.3	−3.7
SDP	P. J. Carlon	603	16.6	−0.1
Majority		105	2.9	−1.7
Turnout		3,642	45.7	+1.7
Labour gain from Conservative		Swing		

=== Village ===
Village
Party	Candidate	Votes	%	±%
Liberal	Mike Cragg	1,780	44.1	−4.4
Conservative	M. J. Booth	1,207	29.9	−1.5
Labour	M. C. Jenkinson	1,052	26.0	+5.9
Majority		573	14.2	−2.9
Turnout		4,039	47.5	−2.2
Liberal hold		Swing		

== By-elections between 1986 and 1987 ==
Talbot By-Election 6 November 1986
Party	Candidate	Votes	%	±%
Labour	P. A. Lane	1,209	68.3	+1.1
Conservative	C. J. Levenston	562	31.7	+9.0
Majority		647	36.5	−8.0
Turnout		1,771	24.3	−11.9
Labour hold		Swing		

Mersey-St. Mary's By-Election 22 January 1987
Party	Candidate	Votes	%	±%
Conservative	S. G. Brownhill	1,610	56.7	+5.0
SDP	R. J. Thompson	683	24.0	+24.0
Labour	P. Miller	550	19.3	−0.2
Majority		927	32.6	+9.8
Turnout		2,843	29.6	−13.8
Conservative hold		Swing		
