= 1995 Trafford Metropolitan Borough Council election =

1995 UK local government election

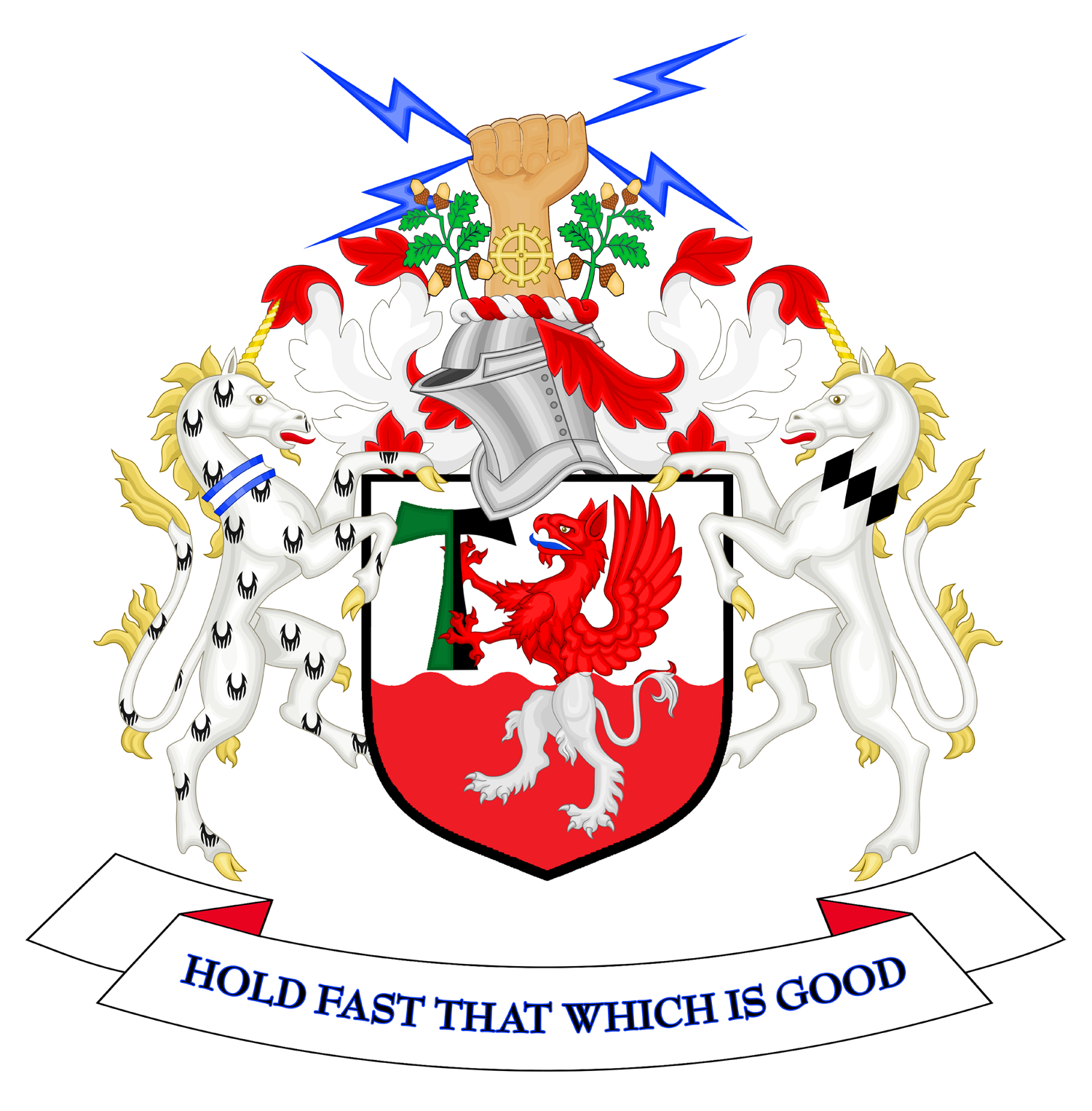
- 4 May 1995

21 of 63 seats to Trafford Metropolitan Borough Council 32 seats needed for a majority
	First party	Second party	Third party
Leader	Beverley Hughes	Frank Eadie	Ray Bowker
Party	Labour	Conservative	Liberal Democrats
Leader's seat	Talbot	Davyhulme East	Village
Last election	11 seats, 41.0%	8 seats, 38.1%	2 seats, 20.7%
Seats before	23	35	5
Seats won	14	5	2
Seats after	29	29	5
Seat change	▲6	▼6	Steady
Popular vote	33,006	27,431	9,522
Percentage	46.4%	38.6%	13.4%
Swing	▲5.4%	▲0.5%	▼7.3%
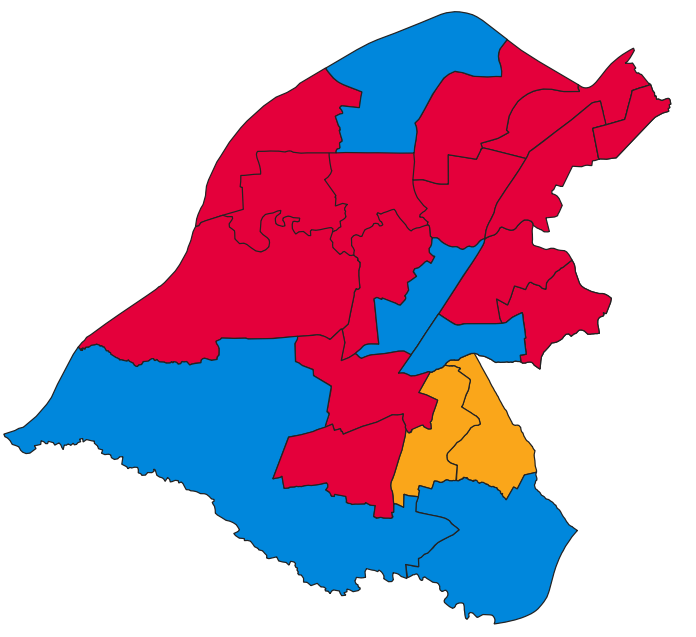
- Map of results of 1995 election
Leader of the Council before election
Frank Eadie
Conservative
Leader of the Council after election
Beverley Hughes
Labour

Elections to Trafford Council were held on 4 May 1995. One-third of the council was up for election, with each successful candidate to serve a four-year term of office, expiring in 1999. The Conservative Party lost overall control of the council, to no overall control.

== Election results ==
Party	Votes		Seats			Full Council	
Labour Party	33,006 (46.4%)	▲5.4	14 (66.7%)	14 / 21	▲6	29 (46.0%)	29 / 63
Conservative Party	27,431 (38.6%)	▲0.5	5 (23.8%)	5 / 21	▼6	29 (46.0%)	29 / 63
Liberal Democrats	9,522 (13.4%)	▼7.3	2 (9.5%)	2 / 21	Steady	5 (7.9%)	5 / 63
Independent	1,126 (1.6%)	N/A	0 (0.0%)	0 / 21	N/A	0 (0.0%)	0 / 63

↓
29	5	29

== Ward results ==
=== Altrincham ===
Altrincham
Party	Candidate	Votes	%	±%
Labour	T. G. Crewe	1,908	49.1	+7.5
Conservative	A. H. Wilson	1,675	43.1	−0.4
Liberal Democrats	K. Clarke	322	8.3	−6.6
Majority		233	6.0	+4.2
Turnout		3,887	44.1	+0.7
Labour gain from Conservative		Swing		

=== Bowdon ===
Bowdon
Party	Candidate	Votes	%	±%
Conservative	S. Poole*	2,139	60.2	+8.1
Labour	H. F. Busteed	815	22.9	+2.0
Liberal Democrats	J. Preston	602	16.9	−10.1
Majority		1,324	37.2	+12.1
Turnout		3,556	38.4	−3.0
Conservative hold		Swing		

=== Broadheath ===
Broadheath
Party	Candidate	Votes	%	±%
Labour	J. D. Chapman-Barker	2,064	53.6	+4.5
Conservative	L. M. L. Burton*	1,451	37.7	+1.6
Liberal Democrats	P. A. Stubbs	333	8.7	−6.1
Majority		613	15.9	−2.9
Turnout		3,848	44.8	−2.2
Labour gain from Conservative		Swing		

=== Brooklands ===
Brooklands
Party	Candidate	Votes	%	±%
Conservative	P. A. Dixon	1,815	49.9	+1.5
Labour	P. Frizzby	986	27.1	+6.1
Liberal Democrats	C. Marchbank-Smith	493	13.6	−16.9
Independent	D. F. Cockayne	343	9.4	+9.4
Majority		829	22.8	+4.9
Turnout		3,637	44.8	−0.5
Conservative hold		Swing		

=== Bucklow ===
Bucklow
Party	Candidate	Votes	%	±%
Labour	K. Rogers*	1,566	77.3	+22.1
Independent	F. Holland	461	22.7	+22.7
Majority		1,105	54.6	+44.2
Turnout		2,027	33.1	−5.9
Labour hold		Swing		

=== Clifford ===
Clifford
Party	Candidate	Votes	%	±%
Labour	E. W. Stennett*	2,122	80.7	+3.9
Conservative	W. R. Monaghan	506	19.3	+1.6
Majority		1,616	61.5	+2.4
Turnout		2,628	33.0	+1.9
Labour hold		Swing		

=== Davyhulme East ===
Davyhulme East
Party	Candidate	Votes	%	±%
Conservative	R. E. Crosbie*	1,840	55.6	+3.1
Labour	S. Hesford	1,467	44.4	+5.4
Majority		373	11.3	−2.3
Turnout		3,307	44.7	−3.8
Conservative hold		Swing		

=== Davyhulme West ===
Davyhulme West
Party	Candidate	Votes	%	±%
Labour	A. Stringer	1,849	50.2	+6.6
Conservative	P. Bates*	1,565	42.5	−3.2
Liberal Democrats	D. M. Browne	267	7.3	−3.4
Majority		284	7.7	+5.6
Turnout		3,681	46.8	+0.9
Labour gain from Conservative		Swing		

=== Flixton ===
Flixton
Party	Candidate	Votes	%	±%
Labour	A. S. Jones	1,688	43.6	+12.5
Conservative	M. P. Whetton	1,539	39.8	−1.0
Liberal Democrats	A. Vernon	643	16.6	−11.4
Majority		149	3.9	−5.8
Turnout		3,870	49.6	−4.1
Labour gain from Conservative		Swing		

=== Hale ===
Hale
Party	Candidate	Votes	%	±%
Conservative	P. J. Myers*	2,012	57.8	+6.8
Liberal Democrats	C. S. Fink	1,251	35.9	−2.8
Labour	R. E. Lucas	509	14.6	+4.3
Majority		1,159	33.3	+21.0
Turnout		3,481	44.3	−1.9
Conservative hold		Swing		

=== Longford ===
Longford
Party	Candidate	Votes	%	±%
Labour	D. P. Jarman*	1,760	61.1	+5.0
Conservative	J. G. Graham	1,122	38.9	−3.0
Majority		638	22.1	+1.8
Turnout		2,882	39.1	−3.8
Labour hold		Swing		

=== Mersey-St. Mary's ===
Mersey St. Marys
Party	Candidate	Votes	%	±%
Conservative	B. Sharp*	1,961	46.9	−2.1
Labour	A. Guttridge	1,473	35.3	−6.2
Liberal Democrats	R. J. Thompson	454	10.9	−10.9
Independent	J. F. S. Kallinicos	290	6.9	+6.9
Majority		488	11.7	−8.2
Turnout		4,178	43.9	−3.5
Conservative hold		Swing		

=== Park ===
Park
Party	Candidate	Votes	%	±%
Labour	R. A. Tully*	1,481	66.7	+7.9
Conservative	E. J. Kelson	739	33.3	+1.2
Majority		742	33.4	+6.7
Turnout		2,220	37.0	−3.6
Labour hold		Swing		

=== Priory ===
Priory
Party	Candidate	Votes	%	±%
Labour	B. M. Keeley-Huggett	1,529	40.6	+3.3
Liberal Democrats	E. Mitchell*	1,276	33.9	+1.4
Conservative	C. M. Dillon	962	25.5	−4.8
Majority		253	6.7	+1.9
Turnout		3,767	48.7	−1.7
Labour gain from Liberal Democrats		Swing		

=== Sale Moor ===
Sale Moor
Party	Candidate	Votes	%	±%
Labour	C. H. Merry*	1,780	53.1	+6.9
Conservative	C. J. J. Lynch	1,265	37.7	−0.5
Liberal Democrats	M. E. Clarke	307	9.2	−6.4
Majority		515	15.4	+7.4
Turnout		3,352	43.8	+4.2
Labour hold		Swing		

=== St. Martin's ===
St. Martins
Party	Candidate	Votes	%	±%
Labour	D. A. Quayle*	2,225	64.8	+7.3
Conservative	C. J. D. Browning	1,209	35.2	+3.1
Majority		1,016	29.6	+3.4
Turnout		3,434	39.2	−4.4
Labour hold		Swing		

=== Stretford ===
Stretford
Party	Candidate	Votes	%	±%
Labour	B. E. Garlick*	2,176	66.2	+8.2
Conservative	J. T. Kelly	1,110	33.8	+0.5
Majority		1,066	32.4	+7.6
Turnout		3,286	42.9	−3.7
Labour hold		Swing		

=== Talbot ===
Talbot
Party	Candidate	Votes	%	±%
Labour	P. A. Lane*	1,642	78.2	+0.6
Conservative	C. J. Levenston	425	20.2	−2.2
Independent	K. J. Martin	32	1.5	+1.5
Majority		1,217	58.0	+2.9
Turnout		2,099	33.5	−1.9
Labour hold		Swing		

=== Timperley ===
Timperley
Party	Candidate	Votes	%	±%
Liberal Democrats	A. M. Bruer-Morris	1,508	40.3	+0.3
Conservative	H. Scholar*	1,400	37.4	−0.9
Labour	H. K. Western	836	22.3	−0.6
Majority		108	2.9	+1.1
Turnout		3,744	44.2	−4.1
Liberal Democrats gain from Conservative		Swing		

=== Urmston ===
Urmston
Party	Candidate	Votes	%	±%
Labour	J. Acton	2,221	62.5	+1.9
Conservative	E. May*	1,335	37.5	−1.9
Majority		886	24.9	+3.8
Turnout		3,556	48.0	−1.8
Labour gain from Conservative		Swing		

=== Village ===
Village
Party	Candidate	Votes	%	±%
Liberal Democrats	B. V. Ackroyd*	2,075	47.8	+0.2
Conservative	A. Bowker	1,361	31.3	−1.5
Labour	S. N. Humby	909	20.9	+1.3
Majority		714	16.4	+1.6
Turnout		4,345	42.5	−7.0
Liberal Democrats hold		Swing		
