= 1996 Trafford Metropolitan Borough Council election =

1996 UK local government election

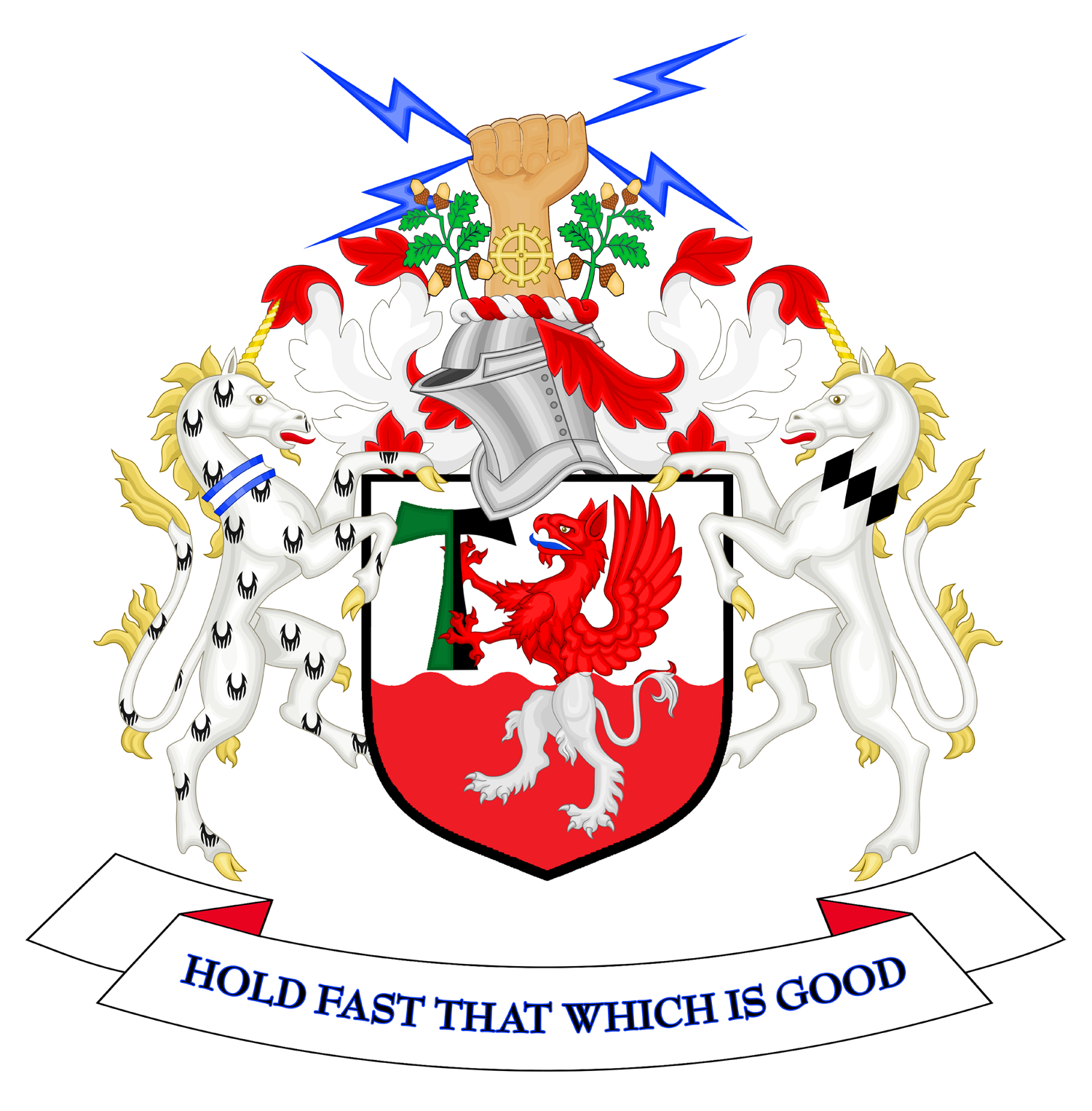
- 2 May 1996

21 of 63 seats to Trafford Metropolitan Borough Council 32 seats needed for a majority
	First party	Second party	Third party
Leader	Beverley Hughes	Frank Eadie	Ray Bowker
Party	Labour	Conservative	Liberal Democrats
Leader's seat	Talbot	Davyhulme East	Village
Last election	14 seats, 46.4%	5 seats, 38.6%	2 seats, 13.4%
Seats before	29	29	5
Seats won	10	10	1
Seats after	35	23	5
Seat change	▲6	▼6	Steady
Popular vote	28,366	26,390	9,344
Percentage	43.9%	40.8%	14.5%
Swing	▼2.5%	▲2.2%	▲1.1%
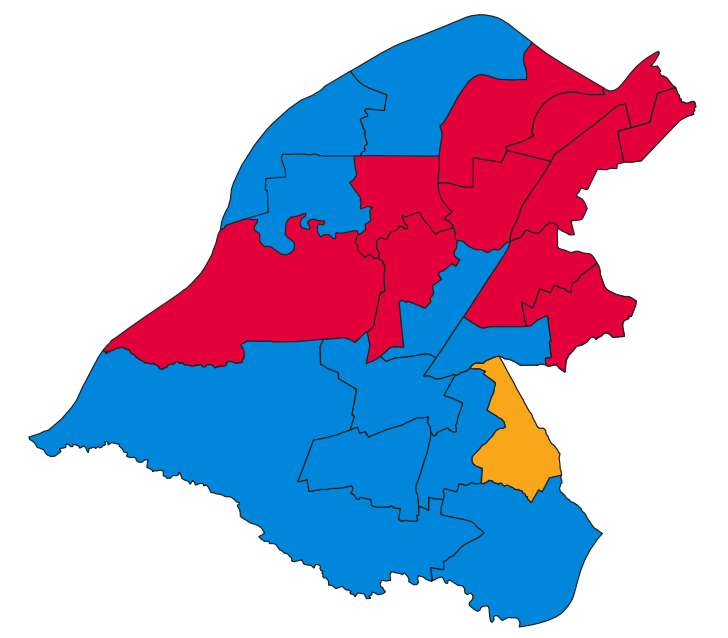
- Map of results of 1996 election
Leader of the Council before election
Beverley Hughes
Labour
Leader of the Council after election
Beverley Hughes
Labour

Elections to Trafford Council were held on 2 May 1996. One-third of the council was up for election, with each successful candidate to serve a four-year term of office, expiring in 2000. The Labour Party gained overall control of the council, from no overall control.

== Election result ==
Party	Votes		Seats			Full Council	
Labour Party	28,366 (43.9%)	▼2.5	10 (47.6%)	10 / 21	▲6	35 (55.6%)	35 / 63
Conservative Party	26,390 (40.8%)	▲2.2	10 (47.6%)	10 / 21	▼6	23 (36.5%)	23 / 63
Liberal Democrats	9,344 (14.5%)	▲1.1	1 (4.8%)	1 / 21	Steady	5 (7.9%)	5 / 63
Independent	550 (0.9%)	▼0.7	0 (0.0%)	0 / 21	Steady	0 (0.0%)	0 / 63

↓
35	5	23

== Ward results ==
=== Altrincham ===
Altrincham
Party	Candidate	Votes	%	±%
Conservative	S. M. O'Bierne*	1,676	49.3	+6.2
Labour	S. D. McNee	1,399	41.2	−7.9
Liberal Democrats	J. B. Weightman	322	9.5	+1.2
Majority		277	8.2	+2.2
Turnout		3,397	38.2	−5.9
Conservative hold		Swing		

=== Bowdon ===
Bowdon
Party	Candidate	Votes	%	±%
Conservative	D. Merrell*	2,150	61.3	+1.1
Labour	M. A. Busteed	692	19.8	−3.1
Liberal Democrats	R. M. Elliott	668	19.0	+2.1
Majority		1,458	41.5	+4.3
Turnout		3,510	38.2	−0.2
Conservative hold		Swing		

=== Broadheath ===
Broadheath
Party	Candidate	Votes	%	±%
Conservative	K. Bullock*	1,767	47.2	+9.5
Labour	H. K. Western	1,660	44.4	−9.2
Liberal Democrats	P. A. Stubbs	314	8.4	−0.3
Majority		107	2.9	−13.0
Turnout		3,741	43.7	−1.1
Conservative hold		Swing		

=== Brooklands ===
Brooklands
Party	Candidate	Votes	%	±%
Conservative	C. J. J. Lynch	1,626	49.0	−0.9
Labour	J. A. Lloyd	1,190	35.8	+8.7
Liberal Democrats	K. Clarke	505	15.2	+1.6
Majority		436	13.1	−9.7
Turnout		3,321	42.1	−2.7
Conservative hold		Swing		

=== Bucklow ===
Bucklow
Party	Candidate	Votes	%	±%
Labour	H. Faulkner*	1,394	82.6	+5.3
Independent	F. Holland	149	8.8	−13.9
Conservative	H. L. Wilde	145	8.6	+8.6
Majority		993	58.8	+4.2
Turnout		1,688	27.5	−5.6
Labour hold		Swing		

=== Clifford ===
Clifford
Party	Candidate	Votes	%	±%
Labour	P. A. Dunnico	1,367	64.8	−15.9
Independent	M. Ali	374	17.7	+17.7
Conservative	A. J. McDonald	370	17.5	−1.8
Majority		993	47.0	−14.5
Turnout		2,111	29.2	−3.8
Labour hold		Swing		

=== Davyhulme East ===
Davyhulme East
Party	Candidate	Votes	%	±%
Conservative	F. H. Eadie*	1,643	57.6	+2.0
Labour	S. Hesford	1,211	42.4	−2.0
Majority		432	15.1	+3.8
Turnout		2,854	41.8	−2.9
Conservative hold		Swing		

=== Davyhulme West ===
Davyhulme West
Party	Candidate	Votes	%	±%
Conservative	J. K. Ackerley*	1,697	50.2	+7.7
Labour	F. Mottley	1,686	49.8	−0.4
Majority		11	0.3	−7.4
Turnout		3,383	43.0	−3.8
Conservative hold		Swing		

=== Flixton ===
Flixton
Party	Candidate	Votes	%	±%
Conservative	E. V. Ward*	1,534	42.5	+2.7
Labour	M. G. H. Barker	1,506	41.7	−1.9
Liberal Democrats	A. Vernon	571	15.8	−0.8
Majority		28	0.8	−3.1
Turnout		3,611	46.2	−3.4
Conservative hold		Swing		

=== Hale ===
Hale
Party	Candidate	Votes	%	±%
Conservative	B. L. Hepburn	2,119	59.7	+1.9
Liberal Democrats	C. S. Fink	960	27.0	−8.9
Labour	R. E. Lucas	473	13.3	−1.3
Majority		1,159	32.6	−0.7
Turnout		3,552	42.1	−2.2
Conservative hold		Swing		

=== Longford ===
Longford
Party	Candidate	Votes	%	±%
Labour	T. S. Faltermeyer	1,544	59.1	−2.0
Conservative	K. G. Summerfield*	1,068	40.9	+2.0
Majority		476	18.2	−3.9
Turnout		2,612	35.4	−3.7
Labour gain from Conservative		Swing		

=== Mersey-St. Mary's ===
Mersey St. Marys
Party	Candidate	Votes	%	±%
Conservative	J. Tolhurst*	1,878	50.1	+3.2
Labour	A. Guttridge	1,318	35.1	−0.2
Liberal Democrats	R. J. Thompson	554	14.8	+3.9
Majority		560	14.9	+3.2
Turnout		3,750	38.3	−5.6
Conservative hold		Swing		

=== Park ===
Park
Party	Candidate	Votes	%	±%
Labour	J. Williams*	1,307	66.8	+0.1
Conservative	E. J. Kelson	650	33.2	−0.1
Majority		657	33.6	+0.2
Turnout		1,957	32.4	−4.6
Labour hold		Swing		

=== Priory ===
Priory
Party	Candidate	Votes	%	±%
Labour	R. O. Griffin	1,540	43.6	+3.0
Liberal Democrats	D. M. Browne	1,171	33.1	−0.8
Conservative	L. M. L. Burton	822	23.3	−2.2
Majority		369	10.4	+3.7
Turnout		3,533	45.8	−2.9
Labour gain from Conservative		Swing		

=== Sale Moor ===
Sale Moor
Party	Candidate	Votes	%	±%
Labour	H. F. Busteed	1,499	48.7	−4.4
Conservative	D. R. Baldwin*	1,169	38.0	+0.3
Liberal Democrats	M. E. Clarke	410	13.3	+4.1
Majority		330	10.7	−4.7
Turnout		3,078	40.3	−3.5
Labour gain from Conservative		Swing		

=== St. Martin's ===
St. Martins
Party	Candidate	Votes	%	±%
Labour	K. C. Harper	1,915	62.3	−2.5
Conservative	M. O. Joyce	922	30.0	−5.2
Liberal Democrats	D. J. Kelly	235	7.6	+7.6
Majority		993	32.3	+2.7
Turnout		3,072	35.2	−4.0
Labour gain from Conservative		Swing		

=== Stretford ===
Stretford
Party	Candidate	Votes	%	±%
Labour	P. Dolan	1,899	62.3	−3.9
Conservative	H. Walker*	1,151	37.7	+3.9
Majority		748	24.5	−7.9
Turnout		3,050	40.1	−2.8
Labour gain from Conservative		Swing		

=== Talbot ===
Talbot
Party	Candidate	Votes	%	±%
Labour	A. Bates*	1,312	76.3	−1.9
Conservative	C. J. Levenston	381	22.2	+2.0
Independent	K. J. Martin	27	1.6	+0.1
Majority		931	54.1	−3.9
Turnout		1,720	28.0	−5.5
Labour hold		Swing		

=== Timperley ===
Timperley
Party	Candidate	Votes	%	±%
Conservative	A. K. Davies*	1,453	41.0	+3.6
Liberal Democrats	C. Smith	1,257	35.4	−4.9
Labour	A. P. Roberts	836	23.6	+1.3
Majority		196	5.5	−2.6
Turnout		3,546	40.8	−3.4
Conservative hold		Swing		

=== Urmston ===
Urmston
Party	Candidate	Votes	%	±%
Labour	W. Clarke	1,961	61.9	−0.6
Conservative	A. Smith	1,208	38.1	+0.6
Majority		753	23.8	−1.1
Turnout		3,169	43.1	−4.9
Labour gain from Conservative		Swing		

=== Village ===
Village
Party	Candidate	Votes	%	±%
Liberal Democrats	R. Bowker*	2,377	59.5	+11.7
Conservative	H. Scholar	961	24.1	−7.2
Labour	S. N. Humby	657	16.4	−4.5
Majority		1,416	35.4	+19.0
Turnout		3,995	42.5	0
Liberal Democrats hold		Swing		

== By-elections between 1996 and 1998 ==
Talbot By-Election 18 September 1997
Party	Candidate	Votes	%	±%
Labour	S. A. Beaumont	935	81.8	+5.5
Conservative	M. Ali	144	12.6	−9.6
Liberal Democrats	F. C. Beswick	64	5.6	+5.6
Majority		791	69.2	+15.1
Turnout		1,143	17.9	−10.1
Labour hold		Swing		
