= 1973 Trafford Metropolitan Borough Council election =

1973 UK local government election

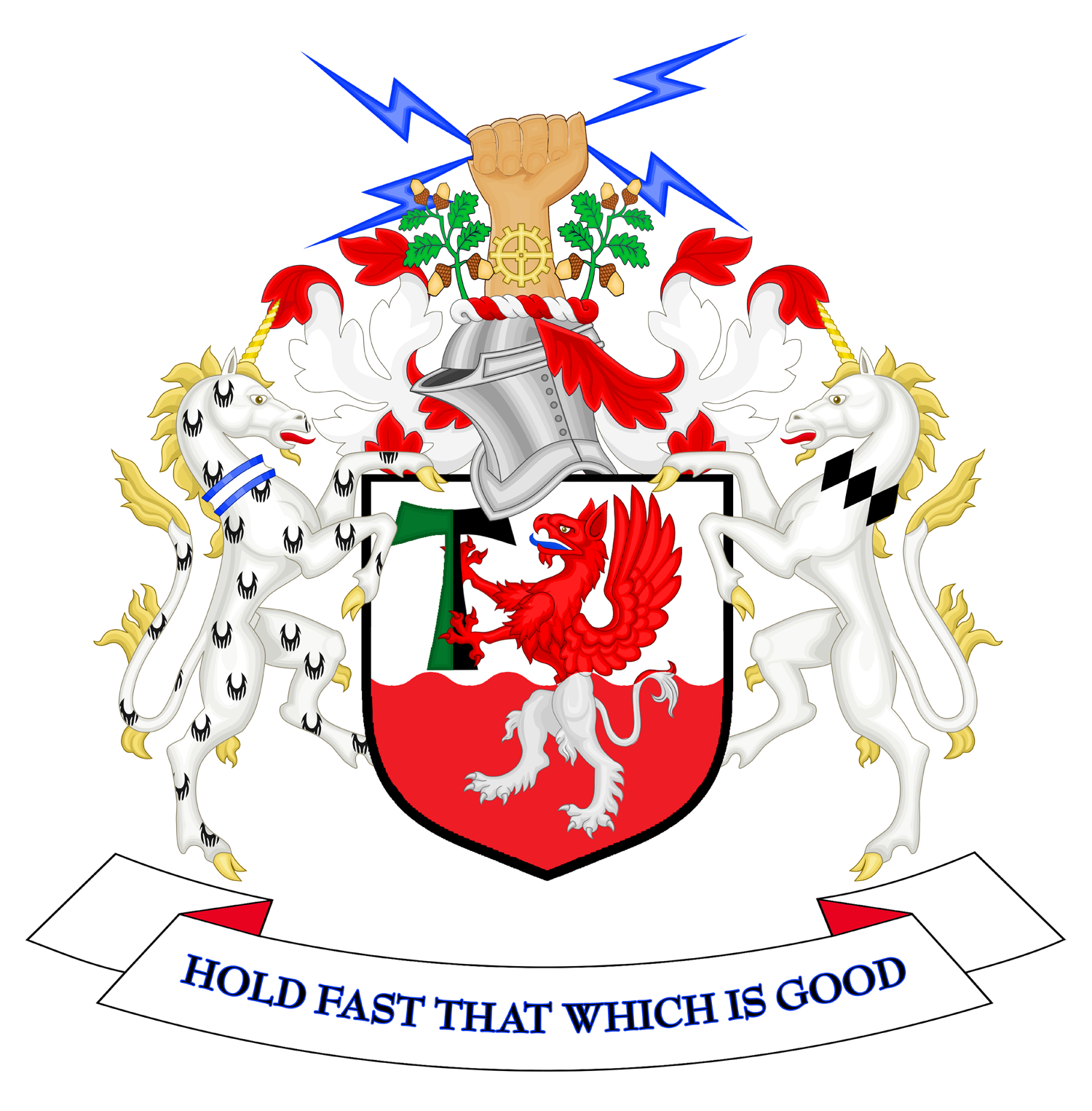
- 10 May 1973

All 63 seats to Trafford Metropolitan Borough Council 32 seats needed for a majority

	First party	Second party	Third party
Leader	Raymond Littler	Bert Pyper	Cecil Fink
Party	Conservative	Labour	Liberal
Leader's seat	Altrincham South West	Park	Brooklands
Seats won	32	19	12
Popular vote	86,043	63,274	39,947
Percentage	45.0%	33.1%	20.9%
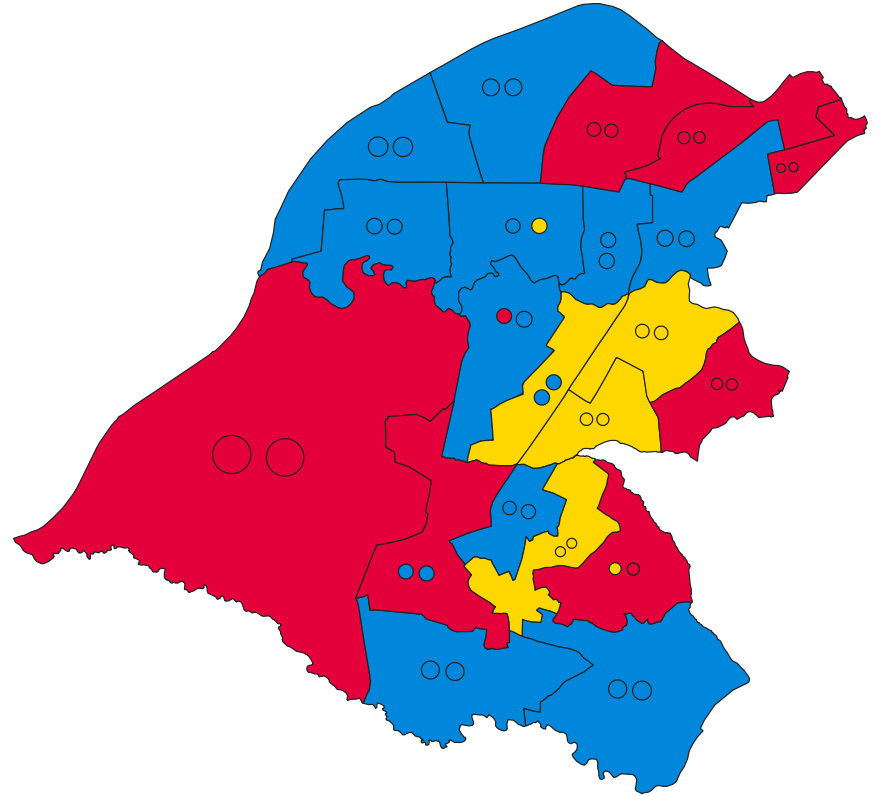
- Winner of each seat at the 1973 Trafford Metropolitan Borough Council election
Leader after election
Raymond Littler
Conservative

The first elections to Trafford Council were held on Thursday, 10 May 1973. This was a new council created to replace the following authorities: the Municipal Borough of Altrincham, the Municipal Borough of Sale, the Municipal Borough of Stretford, Bowdon Urban District, Hale Urban District, Urmston Urban District, and parts of Bucklow Rural District. This election would create the entire 63-member council (3 councillors to each ward), which would shadow its predecessor councils before taking over their functions on 1 April 1974, as specified in the Local Government Act 1972. Each 1st-placed candidate would serve a five-year term of office, expiring in 1978. Each 2nd-placed candidate would serve a three-year term of office, expiring in 1976. Each 3rd-placed candidate would serve a two-year term of office, expiring in 1975.

The Conservative Party won overall control of the council.

== Previous elections ==
The last elections to take place in Trafford's predecessor councils occurred in the first week of May 1972.

Thursday, 4 May 1972.

- 1972 Altrincham Municipal Borough Council election
- 1972 Sale Municipal Borough Council election
- 1972 Stretford Municipal Borough Council election
- 1972 Urmston Urban District Council election

Saturday, 6 May 1972.

- 1972 Bowdon Urban District Council election
- 1972 Hale Urban District Council election

== Election result ==
Party	Votes	Seats	
Conservative Party	86,043 (45.0%)	32 (50.8%)	32 / 63
Labour Party	63,274 (33.1%)	19 (30.2%)	19 / 63
Liberal Party	39,974 (20.9%)	12 (19.0%)	12 / 63
Communist Party	1,220 (0.6%)	0 (0.0%)	0 / 63
Independent	621 (0.3%)	0 (0.0%)	0 / 63

↓
19	12	32

== Ward results ==
=== No.1 (Altrincham South West) ===
Altrincham South West
Party	Candidate	Votes	%	±%
Labour	George Hoyle*	1,265	53.7	
Conservative	Kenneth Harrison*	1,240	52.6	
Conservative	Raymond Littler*	1,150	48.8	
Conservative	Albert Whitehurst	1,140	48.4	
Labour	George Harmer*	1,102	46.8	
Labour	Robert Crossman*	1,075	45.6	
Communist	John Brennan	99	4.2	
Majority		10	0.4	
Turnout		2,357	36.4	
Labour win (new seat)				
Conservative win (new seat)				
Conservative win (new seat)				

=== No.2 (Altrincham East) ===
Altrincham East
Party	Candidate	Votes	%	±%
Liberal	John Davenport*	1,748	43.3	
Liberal	Michael Farnsworth*	1,711	42.3	
Liberal	Roy Richardson*	1,700	42.1	
Conservative	Peter Leigh	1,504	37.3	
Conservative	Paul Field	1,435	35.6	
Conservative	Michael Brown	1,397	34.6	
Labour	Paul Griffiths	881	21.8	
Labour	Robert Coulthard	867	21.5	
Labour	David Teasdale	859	21.3	
Majority		196	4.9	
Turnout		4,034	42.2	
Liberal win (new seat)				
Liberal win (new seat)				
Liberal win (new seat)				

=== No.3 (Altrincham North) ===
Altrincham North
Party	Candidate	Votes	%	±%
Conservative	Ron Metcalf	1,093	35.9	
Conservative	David Stroud*	1,070	35.2	
Conservative	Olga Wilson	1,054	34.6	
Labour	Barry Jones	1,040	34.2	
Liberal	Eric Faulkner*	1,020	33.5	
Labour	John Webb*	974	32.0	
Liberal	Bartholomew Lynch*	966	31.7	
Labour	Winifred Oliver*	952	31.3	
Liberal	Roy Allen	833	27.4	
Communist	Emily Sheldon	129	4.2	
Majority		14	0.5	
Turnout		3,044	45.7	
Conservative win (new seat)				
Conservative win (new seat)				
Conservative win (new seat)				

=== No.4 (Timperley) ===
Timperley
Party	Candidate	Votes	%	±%
Labour	Harry Wharton*	1,283	38.9	
Liberal	Raymond Bowker	1,168	35.4	
Labour	Vincent Collett*	1,165	35.3	
Conservative	Audrey Weedall*	1,138	34.5	
Conservative	Roy Hall	1,076	32.6	
Labour	Kathleen Warrington	1,041	31.5	
Liberal	Peter Beswick	1,008	30.5	
Liberal	Terence Ballard	999	30.3	
Conservative	Roy Alcock	935	28.3	
Communist	Les Whitney	90	2.7	
Majority		27	0.8	
Turnout		3,301	43.7	
Labour win (new seat)				
Liberal win (new seat)				
Labour win (new seat)				

=== No.5 (Mersey-St. Mary’s) ===
Mersey-St. Mary's
Party	Candidate	Votes	%	±%
Liberal	Brian Clancy*	1,876	52.8	
Conservative	Ivor Hurst*	1,777	50.1	
Conservative	Reginald Bannister*	1,774	50.0	
Liberal	Kenneth Humber*	1,752	49.4	
Liberal	Hilary Hughes	1,736	48.9	
Conservative	Joyce Parkins	1,734	48.8	
Majority		22	0.6	
Turnout		3,550	39.9	
Liberal win (new seat)				
Conservative win (new seat)				
Conservative win (new seat)				

=== No.6 (St. Martin’s) ===
St. Martin's
Party	Candidate	Votes	%	±%
Conservative	Michael King	2,178	55.6	
Labour	William Munro*	2,137	54.6	
Conservative	Stanley Brownhill*	2,029	51.8	
Conservative	Geoffrey Rubenstein	1,832	46.8	
Labour	Eric Mellor*	1,800	46.0	
Labour	G. Naggs	1,770	45.2	
Majority		197	5.0	
Turnout		3,915	37.0	
Conservative win (new seat)				
Labour win (new seat)				
Conservative win (new seat)				

=== No.7 (Sale Moor) ===
Sale Moor
Party	Candidate	Votes	%	±%
Labour	Richard Mee*	1,345	57.2	
Labour	Winifred Phillips*	1,344	57.2	
Labour	Barry Brotherton*	1,197	50.9	
Conservative	John Hammond	1,043	44.4	
Conservative	Eric Scarborough	1,028	43.7	
Conservative	Geoffrey de Berry	987	42.0	
Communist	A. H. Burrage	110	4.7	
Majority		154	6.6	
Turnout		2,351	35.1	
Labour win (new seat)				
Labour win (new seat)				
Labour win (new seat)				

=== No.8 (St. Anne’s) ===
St. Anne's
Party	Candidate	Votes	%	±%
Liberal	John Phillipson*	1,605	42.7	
Liberal	John Golding*	1,529	40.7	
Liberal	Alan Thorpe	1,475	39.2	
Conservative	Eric Peet	1,435	38.2	
Conservative	Frank Seddon-Laughton*	1,417	37.7	
Conservative	John Sutton	1,349	35.9	
Labour	Kenneth Walton*	856	22.8	
Labour	Kenneth Tottle	806	21.4	
Labour	Thomas Packham	705	18.8	
Communist	David Hames	102	2.7	
Majority		40	1.1	
Turnout		3,760	44.1	
Liberal win (new seat)				
Liberal win (new seat)				
Liberal win (new seat)				

=== No.9 (Brooklands) ===
Brooklands
Party	Candidate	Votes	%	±%
Liberal	Cecil Fink*	2,073	54.0	
Liberal	Moira Horlock*	2,027	52.8	
Liberal	Sydney Evans	1,905	49.6	
Conservative	George Goodliffe*	1,878	48.9	
Conservative	J. L. Fergusson*	1,796	46.8	
Conservative	A. S. Long*	1,723	44.9	
Communist	Bernard Panter	120	3.1	
Majority		27	0.7	
Turnout		3,841	43.4	
Liberal win (new seat)				
Liberal win (new seat)				
Liberal win (new seat)				

=== No.10 (Talbot North) ===
Talbot North
Party	Candidate	Votes	%	±%
Labour	George Marland*	1,755	65.3	
Labour	Daniel Sullivan*	1,715	63.8	
Labour	Clifford Cronshaw*	1,694	63.1	
Conservative	John Schofield*	956	35.6	
Conservative	Florence Warbrick	905	33.7	
Conservative	G. D. Miles	843	31.4	
Communist	A. Ironmonger	190	7.1	
Majority		738	27.5	
Turnout		2,686	30.1	
Labour win (new seat)				
Labour win (new seat)				
Labour win (new seat)				

=== No.11 (Clifford) ===
Clifford
Party	Candidate	Votes	%	±%
Labour	H. Davies	1,445	58.0	
Labour	V. J. Wynne	1,346	54.0	
Labour	Raymond Tully	1,295	52.0	
Conservative	Roy Corke	1,169	46.9	
Conservative	Edward Kelson	1,123	45.1	
Conservative	K. J. Pulford	1,095	44.0	
Majority		126	5.1	
Turnout		2,491	36.9	
Labour win (new seat)				
Labour win (new seat)				
Labour win (new seat)				

=== No.12 (Longford) ===
Longford
Party	Candidate	Votes	%	±%
Conservative	David Homer*	1,859	54.0	
Conservative	Olive Chandler*	1,811	52.6	
Conservative	Alexander Kelly	1,711	49.7	
Labour	Joan Bailey	1,683	48.9	
Labour	H. Pyper	1,655	48.1	
Labour	K. Silcock	1,606	46.7	
Majority		28	0.8	
Turnout		3,442	35.4	
Conservative win (new seat)				
Conservative win (new seat)				
Conservative win (new seat)				

=== No.13 (Stretford) ===
Stretford
Party	Candidate	Votes	%	±%
Conservative	Margaret Hindley*	1,583	68.7	
Conservative	Colin Warbrick*	1,493	64.8	
Conservative	Harry Walker	1,492	64.8	
Labour	E. P. Wollaston	789	34.3	
Labour	Irene Gregory	777	33.7	
Labour	J. R. Haydock	777	33.7	
Majority		703	30.5	
Turnout		2,303	39.0	
Conservative win (new seat)				
Conservative win (new seat)				
Conservative win (new seat)				

=== No.14 (Park) ===
Park
Party	Candidate	Votes	%	±%
Labour	J. Shaw	1,530	62.2	
Labour	Herbert Pyper*	1,503	61.1	
Labour	James Haydock	1,484	60.3	
Conservative	William Matthews	936	38.0	
Conservative	Evans	886	36.0	
Conservative	Jaminson	860	35.0	
Communist	Jarrett	181	7.4	
Majority		548	22.3	
Turnout		2,460	39.2	
Labour win (new seat)				
Labour win (new seat)				
Labour win (new seat)				

=== No.15 (Bowdon) ===
Bowdon
Party	Candidate	Votes	%	±%
Conservative	Jean Gill*	2,442	73.4	
Conservative	Barbara Sutton Hall*	2,332	70.1	
Conservative	John Humphreys*	2,262	68.0	
Liberal	Frances Vickery*	1,213	36.5	
Labour	Arthur Johnson*	702	21.1	
Labour	John Kill*	543	16.3	
Labour	A. R. Duxbury	487	14.6	
Majority		1,049	31.5	
Turnout		3,327	47.2	
Conservative win (new seat)				
Conservative win (new seat)				
Conservative win (new seat)				

=== No.16 (Hale) ===
Hale
Party	Candidate	Votes	%	±%
Conservative	Marjorie Hinchcliffe*	2,814	68.0	
Conservative	Brian Adams	2,734	66.0	
Conservative	Roy Godwin*	2,726	65.8	
Liberal	Constance Ball*	1,016	24.5	
Liberal	Bernadette Judson	941	22.7	
Liberal	Rosemarie Rivera	897	21.7	
Labour	Joyce Cope	508	12.3	
Labour	E. S. Donnelly	407	9.8	
Labour	M. P. Green	379	9.2	
Majority		1,710	41.3	
Turnout		4,140	44.9	
Conservative win (new seat)				
Conservative win (new seat)				
Conservative win (new seat)				

=== No.17 (Partington) ===
Partington
Party	Candidate	Votes	%	±%
Labour	Frank Holland*	1,277	74.2	
Labour	John Paul*	1,228	71.3	
Labour	Brian Nutter*	1,151	66.8	
Liberal	Albert Appleton*	690	40.1	
Independent	Mark Sharkey*	621	36.1	
Communist	Eileen Wilkinson	199	11.6	
Majority		461	26.8	
Turnout		1,722	24.0	
Labour win (new seat)				
Labour win (new seat)				
Labour win (new seat)				

=== No.18 (Urmston West East) ===
Urmston West East
Party	Candidate	Votes	%	±%
Conservative	Allan Coupe*	1,323	40.2	
Conservative	Ruth Royle-Higginson*	1,270	38.6	
Liberal	Gwen Davies	1,262	38.3	
Liberal	J. Tame	1,261	38.3	
Conservative	Anthony Platt*	1,208	36.7	
Liberal	A. Dickinson	1,169	35.5	
Labour	David O'Kelly*	849	25.8	
Labour	D. Watts	772	23.4	
Labour	W. J. Williams*	769	23.3	
Majority		1	0.0	
Turnout		3,294	39.3	
Conservative win (new seat)				
Conservative win (new seat)				
Liberal win (new seat)				

=== No.19 (Flixton East Central) ===
Flixton East Central
Party	Candidate	Votes	%	±%
Conservative	William Wroe*	1,877	47.4	
Conservative	Neil Fitzpatrick	1,755	44.3	
Conservative	Gordon Lumby	1,737	43.9	
Liberal	Norman Heywood	1,539	38.9	
Liberal	Margaret Willis	1,431	36.2	
Liberal	A. Hannett	1,415	35.8	
Labour	D. M. Hall	735	18.6	
Labour	R. P. Phillips	727	18.4	
Labour	Kathleen Barnes	658	16.6	
Majority		198	5.0	
Turnout		3,958	43.1	
Conservative win (new seat)				
Conservative win (new seat)				
Conservative win (new seat)				

=== No.20 (Flixton West) ===
Flixton West
Party	Candidate	Votes	%	±%
Conservative	George Carnall*	1,964	56.5	
Conservative	Albert Williams	1,908	54.9	
Conservative	H. P. Liddiard	1,897	54.6	
Labour	B. Elliott*	1,636	47.1	
Labour	A. Stringer*	1,538	44.2	
Labour	R. Taylor	1,479	42.5	
Majority		261	7.5	
Turnout		3,476	37.6	
Conservative win (new seat)				
Conservative win (new seat)				
Conservative win (new seat)				

=== No.21 (Davyhulme East) ===
Davyhulme East
Party	Candidate	Votes	%	±%
Conservative	Raymond Haigh*	1,158	64.4	
Conservative	Frank Eadie*	1,148	63.8	
Conservative	Eric Crosbie	1,122	62.4	
Labour	B. Hall	678	37.7	
Labour	D. Stewart	658	36.6	
Labour	G. Scott	629	35.0	
Majority		444	24.7	
Turnout		1,798	33.2	
Conservative win (new seat)				
Conservative win (new seat)				
Conservative win (new seat)				

== By-elections between 1973 and 1975 ==
No.6 (St. Martin's) By-Election 18 July 1974
Party	Candidate	Votes	%	±%
Conservative	Peter Morgan Evans	1,752	46.2	−13.8
Labour	Thomas Packham	1,191	31.4	
Liberal	Michael Wood	849	22.4	
Majority		561	14.8	
Turnout		3,792	34.0	
Conservative gain from Labour		Swing		
