= Mersey St Mary's =

Former electoral ward of Trafford, England

Mersey St Mary's was an electoral ward of Trafford covering the eastern part of Ashton upon Mersey in Sale, Greater Manchester.

The ward was abolished in 2004, and its area split between the new Ashton upon Mersey and St Mary's wards. For the ward's entire existence, it elected Conservative councillors on all but one occasion – at its creation in 1973, it elected 1 Liberal councillor alongside 2 Conservative councillors.

== Councillors ==
Election	Councillor	Councillor	Councillor
1973	Brian Clancy (Lib)	Ivor Hurst (Con)	Reginald Bannister (Con)
1975	Brian Clancy (Lib)	Ivor Hurst (Con)	Reginald Bannister (Con)
1976	Brian Clancy (Lib)	Ivor Hurst (Con)	Reginald Bannister (Con)
1978	Ron Moss (Con)	Ivor Hurst (Con)	Reginald Bannister (Con)
1979	Ron Moss (Con)	Ivor Hurst (Con)	Reginald Bannister (Con)
1980	Ron Moss (Con)	Ivor Hurst (Con)	Reginald Bannister (Con)
1982	Stephen Elder (Con)	Ivor Hurst (Con)	Reginald Bannister (Con)
1983	Stephen Elder (Con)	Ivor Hurst (Con)	Reginald Bannister (Con)
1984	Stephen Elder (Con)	David Silverman (Con)	Reginald Bannister (Con)
1986	Dora Carter (Con)	David Silverman (Con)	Reginald Bannister (Con)
Jan 1987	Dora Carter (Con)	David Silverman (Con)	Stanley Brownhill (Con)
1987	Dora Carter (Con)	David Silverman (Con)	Stanley Brownhill (Con)
1988	Dora Carter (Con)	David Silverman (Con)	Stanley Brownhill (Con)
1990	Dora Carter (Con)	David Silverman (Con)	Bernard Sharp (Con)
1991	Dora Carter (Con)	David Silverman (Con)	Bernard Sharp (Con)
1992	Dora Carter (Con)	John Tolhurst (Con)	Bernard Sharp (Con)
1994	Brian Rigby (Con)	John Tolhurst (Con)	Bernard Sharp (Con)
1995	Brian Rigby (Con)	John Tolhurst (Con)	Bernard Sharp (Con)
1996	Brian Rigby (Con)	John Tolhurst (Con)	Bernard Sharp (Con)
1998	Brian Rigby (Con)	John Tolhurst (Con)	Bernard Sharp (Con)
1999	Brian Rigby (Con)	John Tolhurst (Con)	Bernard Sharp (Con)
2000	Brian Rigby (Con)	John Tolhurst (Con)	Bernard Sharp (Con)
2002	Brian Rigby (Con)	John Tolhurst (Con)	Bernard Sharp (Con)
2003	Brian Rigby (Con)	John Tolhurst (Con)	John Lamb (Con)

== Elections in the 2000s ==
2003
Party	Candidate	Votes	%	±%
Conservative	John Lamb	2,877	54.4	−1.4
Labour	Sophie Taylor	1,548	29.3	−1.7
Liberal Democrats	Graham Rogers	779	14.7	+1.5
Socialist Labour	James Flannery	81	1.5	+1.5
Majority		1,329	25.1	+0.3
Turnout		5,285	55.8	+1.2
Conservative hold		Swing		

2002
Party	Candidate	Votes	%	±%
Conservative	Brian Rigby*	2,914	55.8	−9.0
Labour	Sophie Taylor	1,621	31.0	+8.2
Liberal Democrats	Graham Rogers	687	13.2	+0.7
Majority		1,293	24.8	−17.2
Turnout		5,222	54.6	+22.1
Conservative hold		Swing		

2000
Party	Candidate	Votes	%	±%
Conservative	John Tolhurst*	2,048	64.8	+6.1
Labour	Tamira Rasul	720	22.8	−9.3
Liberal Democrats	Graham Rogers	395	12.5	+3.3
Majority		1,328	42.0	+15.5
Turnout		3,163	32.5	−1.2
Conservative hold		Swing		

== Elections in the 1990s ==
1999
Party	Candidate	Votes	%	±%
Conservative	Sharp*	1,935	58.7	−4.6
Labour	Conquest	1,056	32.1	+4.1
Liberal Democrats	Legge	304	9.2	+0.5
Majority		879	26.5	−8.8
Turnout		3,295	33.7	−1.0
Conservative hold		Swing		

1998
Party	Candidate	Votes	%	±%
Conservative	B. D. Rigby*	2,155	63.3	+13.2
Labour	J. Bennett	952	28.0	−7.1
Liberal Democrats	G. P. Rogers	297	8.7	−6.1
Majority		1,203	35.3	+20.9
Turnout		3,404	34.7	−3.6
Conservative hold		Swing		

1996
Party	Candidate	Votes	%	±%
Conservative	J. Tolhurst*	1,878	50.1	+3.2
Labour	A. Guttridge	1,318	35.1	−0.2
Liberal Democrats	R. J. Thompson	554	14.8	+3.9
Majority		560	14.9	+3.2
Turnout		3,750	38.3	−5.6
Conservative hold		Swing		

1995
Party	Candidate	Votes	%	±%
Conservative	B. Sharp*	1,961	46.9	−2.1
Labour	A. Guttridge	1,473	35.3	−6.2
Liberal Democrats	R. J. Thompson	454	10.9	−10.9
Independent	J. F. S. Kallinicos	290	6.9	+6.9
Majority		488	11.7	−8.2
Turnout		4,178	43.9	−3.5
Conservative hold		Swing		

1994
Party	Candidate	Votes	%	±%
Conservative	B. D. Rigby	2,193	49.0	−20.6
Labour	A. Guttridge	1,303	29.1	+9.4
Liberal Democrats	R. M. Elliott	975	21.8	+11.1
Majority		890	19.9	−30.0
Turnout		4,471	47.4	+5.4
Conservative hold		Swing		

1992
Party	Candidate	Votes	%	±%
Conservative	J. Tolhurst	2,732	69.6	+6.1
Labour	B. D. Eckford	774	19.7	−3.0
Liberal Democrats	R. M. Elliott	419	10.7	−3.1
Majority		1,958	49.9	+9.1
Turnout		3,925	42.0	−6.5
Conservative hold		Swing		

1991
Party	Candidate	Votes	%	±%
Conservative	B. Sharp*	2,884	63.5	+1.9
Labour	B. D. Eckford	1,030	22.7	−4.6
Liberal Democrats	R. J. Thompson	629	13.8	+8.0
Majority		1,854	40.8	+24.8
Turnout		4,543	48.5	−1.9
Conservative hold		Swing		

1990
Party	Candidate	Votes	%	±%
Conservative	D. I. Carter*	2,820	31.6	+2.7
Conservative	B. Sharp	2,678	30.0	−0.5
Labour	B. D. Eckford	1,249	14.0	+4.4
Labour	L. M. Wright	1,190	13.3	+3.0
Liberal Democrats	R. J. Thompson	513	5.8	−10.1
Green	A. M. Bowden	466	5.2	+5.2
Majority		1,429	16.0	−5.0
Turnout		8,916	50.4	+5.4
Conservative hold		Swing		
Conservative hold		Swing		

== Elections in the 1980s ==
1988
Party	Candidate	Votes	%	±%
Conservative	D. F. Silverman*	2,613	60.5	+1.2
Labour	P. Miller	1,017	23.6	+6.3
Liberal Democrats	R. J. Thompson	687	15.9	−7.4
Majority		1,596	37.0	+1.0
Turnout		4,317	45.0	−5.0
Conservative hold		Swing		

1987
Party	Candidate	Votes	%	±%
Conservative	S. G. Brownhill*	2,862	59.3	+7.6
SDP	R. J. Thompson	1,125	23.3	+23.3
Labour	P. Miller	836	17.3	−2.2
Majority		1,737	36.0	+13.2
Turnout		4,823	50.0	+6.6
Conservative hold		Swing		

By-Election 22 January 1987
Party	Candidate	Votes	%	±%
Conservative	S. G. Brownhill	1,610	56.7	+5.0
SDP	R. J. Thompson	683	24.0	+24.0
Labour	P. Miller	550	19.3	−0.2
Majority		927	32.6	+9.8
Turnout		2,843	29.6	−13.8
Conservative hold		Swing		

1986
Party	Candidate	Votes	%	±%
Conservative	D. I. Carter	2,155	51.7	−7.2
Liberal	A. Kelly	1,202	28.8	+4.5
Labour	P. J. English	815	19.5	+2.7
Majority		953	22.8	−11.7
Turnout		4,172	43.4	+4.3
Conservative hold		Swing		

1984
Party	Candidate	Votes	%	±%
Conservative	D. F. Silverman	2,212	58.9	−0.8
Liberal	J. B. Weightman	914	24.3	−2.6
Labour	M. R. H. Bradbury	631	16.8	+3.4
Majority		1,298	34.5	+1.7
Turnout		3,757	39.1	−7.4
Conservative hold		Swing		

1983
Party	Candidate	Votes	%	±%
Conservative	R. P. Bannister*	2,631	59.7	−2.6
Alliance	J. B. Weightman	1,185	26.9	+2.0
Labour	N. J. Bentham	592	13.4	+0.6
Majority		1,446	32.8	−4.6
Turnout		4,408	46.5	+4.1
Conservative hold		Swing		

1982
Party	Candidate	Votes	%	±%
Conservative	S. A. Elder	2,510	62.3	+10.4
SDP	E. P. M. Wollaston	1,004	24.9	+24.9
Labour	B. R. Coates	515	12.8	−8.6
Majority		1,506	37.4	+12.2
Turnout		4,029	42.4	−4.2
Conservative hold		Swing		

1980
Party	Candidate	Votes	%	±%
Conservative	I. H. Hurst*	2,306	51.9	−2.5
Liberal	E. Critchlow	1,188	26.7	−2.2
Labour	H. Pollard	951	21.4	+4.7
Majority		1,118	25.2	−0.4
Turnout		4,445	46.6	−32.0
Conservative hold		Swing		

== Elections in the 1970s ==
1979
Party	Candidate	Votes	%	±%
Conservative	R. P. Bannister*	3,873	54.4	−5.0
Liberal	E. Critchlow	2,055	28.9	+2.7
Labour	C. Younghusband	1,186	16.7	+2.3
Majority		1,818	25.6	−7.6
Turnout		7,114	78.6	+37.6
Conservative hold		Swing		

1978
Party	Candidate	Votes	%	±%
Conservative	R. Moss	2,208	59.4	−1.4
Liberal	E. Critchlow	973	26.2	−3.2
Labour	C. Younghusband	534	14.4	+4.6
Majority		1,235	33.2	+1.7
Turnout		3,715	41.0	−4.0
Conservative gain from Liberal		Swing		

1976
Party	Candidate	Votes	%	±%
Conservative	I. H. Hurst*	2,451	60.8	+4.3
Liberal	R. Elliott	1,184	29.4	−14.1
Labour	R. A. Tully	393	9.8	+9.8
Majority		1,267	31.5	+18.4
Turnout		4,028	45.0	+3.6
Conservative hold		Swing		

1975
Party	Candidate	Votes	%	±%
Conservative	R. P. Bannister*	2,069	56.5	
Liberal	K. F. Humber	1,591	43.5	
Majority		478	13.1	
Turnout		3,660	41.4	
Conservative hold		Swing		

1973
Party	Candidate	Votes	%	±%
Liberal	B. P. Clancy	1,876	51.4	
Conservative	I. H. Hurst	1,777	48.6	
Conservative	R. P. Bannister	1,774		
Liberal	K. Humber	1,752		
Liberal	M. Hughes	1,736		
Conservative	J. Parkins	1,734		
Majority		22		
Turnout		3,628	39.9	
Liberal win (new seat)				
Conservative win (new seat)				
Conservative win (new seat)				
