= Sale Moor (ward) =

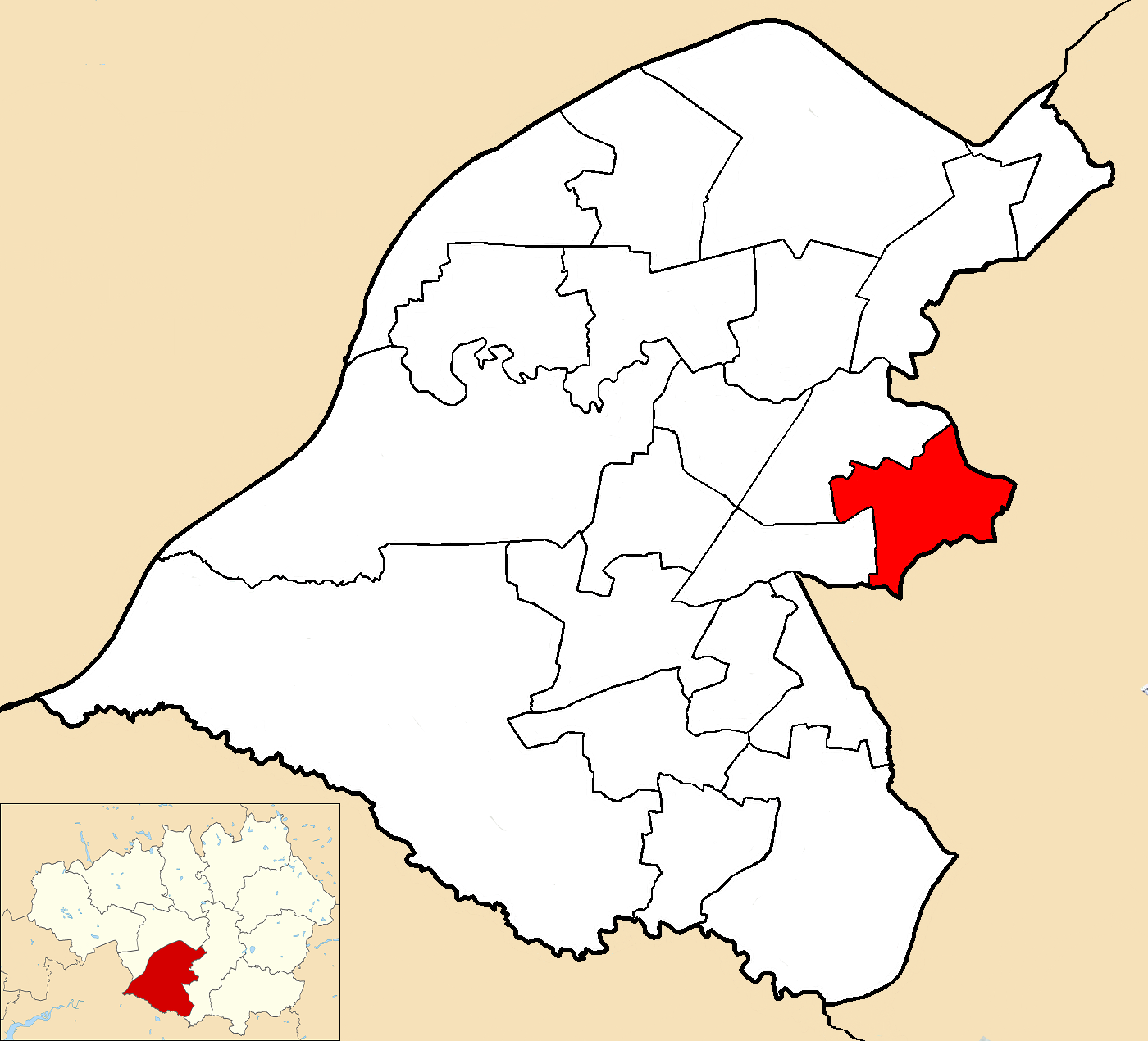
- Sale Moor within Trafford
- Population: 10,508
- Metropolitan borough: Trafford
- Metropolitan county: Greater Manchester
- Country: England
- Sovereign state: United Kingdom
- UK Parliament: Wythenshawe and Sale East
- Councillors: Liz Patel (Labour); Joanne Bennett (Labour Co-op); Olly Baskerville (Labour)

Sale Moor is an electoral ward of Trafford, Greater Manchester, covering the eastern part of Sale, including Sale Moor Village.

== Councillors ==
As of 2023, the councillors are Liz Patel (Labour), Joanne Bennett (Labour Co-op), and Olly Baskerville (Labour).

Election	Councillor	Councillor	Councillor
1973	Richard Mee (Lab)	Winifred Phillips (Lab)	Barry Brotherton (Lab)
1975	Richard Mee (Lab)	Winifred Phillips (Lab)	A. Rhodes (Con)
1976	Richard Mee (Lab)	Stephen Turner (Con)	A. Rhodes (Con)
1978	Richard Mee (Lab)	Stephen Turner (Con)	A. Rhodes (Con)
1979	Richard Mee (Lab)	Stephen Turner (Con)	Cicely Merry (Lab)
1980	Richard Mee (Lab)	Barry Brotherton (Lab)	Cicely Merry (Lab)
1982	Richard Mee (Lab)	Barry Brotherton (Lab)	Cicely Merry (Lab)
1983	Richard Mee (Lab)	Barry Brotherton (Lab)	Cicely Merry (Lab)
1984	Richard Mee (Lab)	Barry Brotherton (Lab)	Cicely Merry (Lab)
1986	Richard Mee (Lab)	Barry Brotherton (Lab)	Cicely Merry (Lab)
1987	Richard Mee (Lab)	Barry Brotherton (Lab)	Cicely Merry (Lab)
1988	Richard Mee (Lab)	Barry Brotherton (Lab)	Cicely Merry (Lab)
1990	Philip Gratrix (Lab)	Barry Brotherton (Lab)	Cicely Merry (Lab)
1991	Philip Gratrix (Lab)	Barry Brotherton (Lab)	Cicely Merry (Lab)
1992	Philip Gratrix (Lab)	Roy Baldwin (Con)	Cicely Merry (Lab)
1994	Philip Gratrix (Lab)	Roy Baldwin (Con)	Cicely Merry (Lab)
1995	Philip Gratrix (Lab)	Roy Baldwin (Con)	Cicely Merry (Lab)
1996	Philip Gratrix (Lab)	Helen Busteed (Lab)	Cicely Merry (Lab)
1998	Philip Gratrix (Lab)	Helen Busteed (Lab)	Cicely Merry (Lab)
1999	Philip Gratrix (Lab)	Helen Busteed (Lab)	Munaver Rasul (Lab)
2000	Philip Gratrix (Lab)	Helen Busteed (Lab)	Munaver Rasul (Lab)
2002	Philip Gratrix (Lab)	Helen Busteed (Lab)	Munaver Rasul (Lab)
2003	Philip Gratrix (Lab)	Helen Busteed (Lab)	Munaver Rasul (Lab)
2004	Philip Gratrix (Lab)	Joanne Bennett (Lab Co-op)	Christine Bailey (Con)
2006	Philip Gratrix (Lab)	Joanne Bennett (Lab Co-op)	Christine Bailey (Con)
2007	Philip Gratrix (Lab)	Joanne Bennett (Lab Co-op)	Christine Bailey (Con)
2008	Nigel Hooley (Con)	Joanne Bennett (Lab Co-op)	Christine Bailey (Con)
2010	Nigel Hooley (Con)	Joanne Bennett (Lab Co-op)	Philip Gratrix (Lab)
2011	Nigel Hooley (Con)	Joanne Bennett (Lab Co-op)	Philip Gratrix (Lab)
2012	Mike Freeman (Lab)	Joanne Bennett (Lab Co-op)	Philip Gratrix (Lab)
2014	Mike Freeman (Lab)	Joanne Bennett (Lab Co-op)	Philip Gratrix (Lab)
2015	Mike Freeman (Lab)	Joanne Bennett (Lab Co-op)	Philip Gratrix (Lab)
2016	Mike Freeman (Lab)	Joanne Bennett (Lab Co-op)	Philip Gratrix (Lab)
2018	Mike Freeman (Lab)	Joanne Bennett (Lab Co-op)	Liz Patel (Lab)
2019	Mike Freeman (Lab)	Joanne Bennett (Lab Co-op)	Liz Patel (Lab)
2021	Mike Freeman (Lab)	Joanne Bennett (Lab Co-op)	Liz Patel (Lab)
2022	Mike Freeman (Lab)	Joanne Bennett (Lab Co-op)	Liz Patel (Lab)
2023	Joanne Bennett (Lab)	Liz Patel (Lab)	Olly Baskerville (Lab)
2024	Joanne Bennett (Lab)	Liz Patel (Lab)	Olly Baskerville (Lab)

indicates seat up for re-election.

== Elections in the 2020s ==
=== May 2026 ===
2026
Party	Candidate	Votes	%	±%
Labour	Liz Patel*	1,471	36.8	−21.1
Reform	James McCullough	985	24.6	N/A
Green	Chris Hargreaves	786	19.7	+7.4
Conservative	Kishorchandra Patil	533	13.3	−9.3
Liberal Democrats	James Miller	208	5.2	−0.8
Majority		486	12.2	−23.1
Rejected ballots		13	0.3	-0.9
Turnout		3,998	47.9	+8.5
Registered electors		8,343		
Labour hold		Swing	+1.2	

=== May 2024 ===
2024
Party	Candidate	Votes	%	±%
Labour	Olly Baskerville*	1,863	57.9	+1.2
Conservative	Sue Carroll	728	22.6	−1.1
Green	Chris Hargreaves	394	12.3	−0.3
Liberal Democrats	James Miller	192	6.0	−1.9
Majority		1,135	35.3	+4.8
Rejected ballots		39	1.2	+0.1
Turnout		3,216	39.2	+1.6
Registered electors		8,198		
Labour hold		Swing	+1.2	

=== May 2023 ===
2023 (3)
Party	Candidate	Votes	%	±%
Labour	Joanne Bennett*	1,737	56.7%	
Labour	Liz Patel*	1,682	54.9%	
Labour	Olly Baskerville	1,662	54.2%	
Conservative	Daniel Bell	726	23.7%	
Conservative	Christopher Halliday	689	22.5%	
Conservative	John Morten	596	19.4%	
Green	Chris Hargreaves	386	12.6%	
Green	Samuel Hession	285	9.3%	
Green	Steve Leicester	246	8.0%	
Liberal Democrats	Mark Campion	242	7.9%	
Majority				
Rejected ballots		33	1.1%	
Turnout		3,066	37.6%	
Registered electors		8,165		

=== May 2022 ===
2022
Party	Candidate	Votes	%	±%
Labour	Liz Patel*	1,577	56.0	
Conservative	Christopher Halliday	830	29.5	
Green	Chris Hargreaves	264	9.4	
Liberal Democrats	Mario Miniaci	136	4.8	
Majority		747	26.5	
Registered electors		7,606		
Turnout		2,818	37.0	
Labour hold		Swing		

=== May 2021 ===
2021
Party	Candidate	Votes	%	±%
Labour	Mike Freeman*	1,812	56.7	▲1.1
Conservative	Daniel Bell	971	30.4	▼2.0
Green	Stephen Leicester	268	8.4	▲1.5
Liberal Democrats	Marc Ramsbottom	128	4.0	▼0.8
Majority		841	26.3	▲3.1
Rejected ballots		17		
Registered electors		7,635		
Turnout		3,197	41.9	▲3.9
Labour hold		Swing	▲1.6	

== Elections in the 2010s ==
=== May 2019 ===
2019
Party	Candidate	Votes	%	±%
Labour Co-op	Joanne Bennett*	1,347	52.4	▲0.7
Conservative	Matt Leigh	664	25.9	▼9.1
Green	Jane Leicester	355	13.8	▲8
Liberal Democrats	Simon Wright	203	7.9	▲0.4
Majority		683	26.6	▲9.9
Registered electors		7,549		
Turnout		2,569	34.03	▼2.37
Labour hold		Swing		

=== May 2018 ===
2018
Party	Candidate	Votes	%	±%
Labour	Liz Patel	1,433	51.7	−4.0
Conservative	Darren Christopher Meacher	971	35.0	+2.5
Liberal Democrats	Czarina Kirk	207	7.5	+2.7
Green	Jane Leicester	161	5.8	−1.1
Majority		462	16.7	
Turnout		2,772	36.4	−1.6
Labour hold		Swing		

=== May 2016 ===
2016
Party	Candidate	Votes	%	±%
Labour	Mike Freeman*	1,547	55.6	+5.0
Conservative	Stephen McHugh	902	32.4	−6.7
Green	Jane Leicester	192	6.9	−3.2
Liberal Democrats	William Jones	134	4.8	+4.8
Majority		645	23.2	+11.7
Turnout		2,783	38.0	−28.1
Labour hold		Swing		

=== May 2015 ===
2015
Party	Candidate	Votes	%	±%
Labour	Joanne Bennett*	2,512	50.7	+5.6
Conservative	Tony Field	1,939	39.2	+10.6
Green	Paul Bayliss	499	10.1	+2.6
Majority		573	11.5	−4.0
Turnout		4,950	66.1	+29.5
Labour hold		Swing		

=== May 2014 ===
2014
Party	Candidate	Votes	%	±%
Labour	Philip Gratrix*	1,217	45.1	−4.0
Conservative	Michael Parris	772	28.6	−8.8
UKIP	Barry Higgs	408	15.1	+15.1
Green	Paul Bayliss	202	7.5	+0.1
Liberal Democrats	Kenneth Clarke	98	3.6	−2.5
Majority		445	16.5	+4.8
Turnout		2,697	36.6	−1.3
Labour hold		Swing		

=== May 2012 ===
2012
Party	Candidate	Votes	%	±%
Labour	Mike Freeman	1,355	49.1	+1.8
Conservative	Nigel Hooley*	1,032	37.4	−2.5
Green	Nigel Woodcock	205	7.4	+1.4
Liberal Democrats	Joseph Carter	168	6.1	−0.7
Majority		323	11.7	+4.3
Turnout		2,760	37.9	−3.8
Labour gain from Conservative		Swing		

=== May 2011 ===
2011
Party	Candidate	Votes	%	±%
Labour Co-op	Joanne Bennett*	1,494	47.3	+6.4
Conservative	Michael Parris	1,260	39.9	+6.3
Liberal Democrats	Joseph Carter	216	6.8	−14.7
Green	Nigel Woodcock	191	6.0	+2.0
Majority		234	7.4	+0.1
Turnout		3,161	41.7	−23.5
Labour hold		Swing		

=== May 2010 ===
2010
Party	Candidate	Votes	%	±%
Labour	Philip Gratrix	2,032	40.9	+1.1
Conservative	Christine Bailey*	1,668	33.6	−6.3
Liberal Democrats	Derek Hurst	1,068	21.5	+9.0
Green	Bridget Battye	198	4.0	−3.8
Majority		364	7.3	+7.2
Turnout		4,966	65.2	+28.6
Labour gain from Conservative		Swing		

== Elections in the 2000s ==
=== May 2008 ===
2008
Party	Candidate	Votes	%	±%
Conservative	Nigel Hooley	1,120	39.9	+4.9
Labour	Philip Gratrix*	1,116	39.8	−0.8
Liberal Democrats	Margaret Clarke	351	12.5	+1.9
Green	Bridget Battye	218	7.8	+2.6
Majority		4	0.1	−5.5
Turnout		2,805	36.6	−2.6
Conservative gain from Labour		Swing		

=== May 2007 ===
2007
Party	Candidate	Votes	%	±%
Labour	Joanne Bennett*	1,175	40.6	+1.5
Conservative	Brian Shaw	1,013	35.0	−5.0
Liberal Democrats	Margaret Clarke	306	10.6	−10.3
English Democrat	Craig Healey	252	8.7	+8.7
Green	Bridget Battye	150	5.2	+5.2
Majority		162	5.6	+4.7
Turnout		2,896	39.2	+2.6
Labour hold		Swing		

=== May 2006 ===
2006
Party	Candidate	Votes	%	±%
Conservative	Christine Bailey*	1,076	40.0	+1.5
Labour	Stephen Smith	1,051	39.1	−0.3
Liberal Democrats	James Eisen	562	20.9	−1.8
Majority		25	0.9	−1.0
Turnout		2,689	36.6	−7.8
Conservative hold		Swing		

=== May 2004 ===
2004 (after boundary changes)
Party	Candidate	Votes	%	±%
Labour	Philip Gratrix*	1,219	13.8	
Labour	Joanne Bennett	1,198	13.6	
Conservative	Christine Bailey	1,172	13.3	
Conservative	Pervez Nakvi	1,116	12.7	
Conservative	John Schofield	1,105	12.5	
Labour	Munaver Rasul*	1,007	11.4	
Liberal Democrats	Margaret Clarke	688	7.8	
Liberal Democrats	Kenneth Clarke	659	7.5	
Liberal Democrats	Colin Bearfield	650	7.4	
Turnout		8,814	44.4	
Labour win (new seat)				
Labour win (new seat)				
Conservative win (new seat)				

=== May 2003 ===
2003
Party	Candidate	Votes	%	±%
Labour	Munaver Rasul*	1,385	36.0	−11.5
Conservative	Pervez Nakvi	1,247	32.4	−0.3
Liberal Democrats	Margaret Clarke	1,212	31.5	+17.4
Majority		138	3.6	−11.2
Turnout		3,844	50.7	−2.5
Labour hold		Swing		

=== May 2002 ===
2002
Party	Candidate	Votes	%	±%
Labour	Philip Gratrix*	1,906	47.5	+3.0
Conservative	Christopher Lynch	1,311	32.7	−11.0
Liberal Democrats	Derek Hurst	564	14.1	+2.3
Independent	Majorie Hepburn	232	5.8	+5.8
Majority		595	14.8	+14.0
Turnout		4,013	53.2	+19.6
Labour hold		Swing		

=== May 2000 ===
2000
Party	Candidate	Votes	%	±%
Labour	Helen Busteed*	1,143	44.5	−4.6
Conservative	Marjorie Hepburn	1,121	43.7	+6.2
Liberal Democrats	Derek Hurst	303	11.8	−1.6
Majority		22	0.8	−10.8
Turnout		2,567	33.6	+2.1
Labour hold		Swing		

== Elections in the 1990s ==
1999
Party	Candidate	Votes	%	±%
Labour	Rasul	1,177	49.1	−5.0
Conservative	RD Baldwin	897	37.5	+3.0
Liberal Democrats	K Clarke	321	13.4	+3.4
Majority		280	11.6	−8.0
Turnout		2,395	31.5	−1.9
Labour hold		Swing		

1998
Party	Candidate	Votes	%	±%
Labour	P. Gratrix*	1,380	54.1	+5.4
Conservative	R. D. Baldwin	880	34.5	−3.5
Liberal Democrats	K. Clarke	256	10.0	−3.3
Socialist Labour	L. M. Wright	36	1.4	+1.4
Majority		500	19.6	+8.9
Turnout		2,552	33.4	−6.9
Labour hold		Swing		

1996
Party	Candidate	Votes	%	±%
Labour	H. F. Busteed	1,499	48.7	−4.4
Conservative	D. R. Baldwin*	1,169	38.0	+0.3
Liberal Democrats	M. E. Clarke	410	13.3	+4.1
Majority		330	10.7	−4.7
Turnout		3,078	40.3	−3.5
Labour gain from Conservative		Swing		

1995
Party	Candidate	Votes	%	±%
Labour	C. H. Merry*	1,780	53.1	+6.9
Conservative	C. J. J. Lynch	1,265	37.7	−0.5
Liberal Democrats	M. E. Clarke	307	9.2	−6.4
Majority		515	15.4	+7.4
Turnout		3,352	43.8	+4.2
Labour hold		Swing		

1994
Party	Candidate	Votes	%	±%
Labour	P. Gratrix*	1,697	46.2	+6.8
Conservative	C. J. J. Lynch	1,403	38.2	−5.9
Liberal Democrats	M. E. Clarke	572	15.6	−0.9
Majority		294	8.0	+3.3
Turnout		3,672	48.0	+5.8
Labour hold		Swing		

1992
Party	Candidate	Votes	%	±%
Conservative	D. R. Baldwin	1,419	44.1	+6.6
Labour	B. Brotherton*	1,269	39.4	−4.5
Liberal Democrats	A. P. Sutherland	530	16.5	−2.1
Majority		150	4.7	−1.7
Turnout		3,218	42.2	−5.2
Conservative gain from Labour		Swing		

1991
Party	Candidate	Votes	%	±%
Labour	C. H. Merry*	1,608	43.9	−4.0
Conservative	F. Leigh	1,373	37.5	−1.1
Liberal Democrats	K. Clarke	681	18.6	+9.2
Majority		235	6.4	−2.9
Turnout		3,662	47.4	−3.4
Labour hold		Swing		

1990
Party	Candidate	Votes	%	±%
Labour	P. Gratrix	1,917	47.9	+1.1
Conservative	F. Leigh	1,544	38.6	−3.9
Liberal Democrats	K. Clarke	377	9.4	−1.3
Green	R. Dean	164	4.1	+4.1
Majority		373	9.3	+5.0
Turnout		4,002	50.8	+5.4
Labour hold		Swing		

== Elections in the 1980s ==
1988
Party	Candidate	Votes	%	±%
Labour	B. Brotherton*	1,679	46.8	+7.8
Conservative	G. V. Burrows	1,526	42.5	+6.4
Liberal Democrats	J. A. S. Hunter	386	10.7	−12.4
Majority		153	4.3	+1.5
Turnout		3,591	45.4	−3.1
Labour hold		Swing		

1987
Party	Candidate	Votes	%	±%
Labour	C. H. Merry*	1,485	39.0	−9.9
Conservative	G. V. Burrows	1,377	36.1	+6.8
SDP	K. Clarke	881	23.1	+23.1
Green	A. M. Bowden	69	1.8	+1.8
Majority		108	2.8	−16.8
Turnout		3,812	48.5	+8.6
Labour hold		Swing		

1986
Party	Candidate	Votes	%	±%
Labour	R. Mee*	1,509	48.9	+7.2
Conservative	E. A. Robinson	905	29.3	−5.7
Liberal	H. M. Hughes	671	21.8	+21.8
Majority		604	19.6	+12.8
Turnout		3,085	39.9	−2.2
Labour hold		Swing		

1984
Party	Candidate	Votes	%	±%
Labour	B. Brotherton*	1,376	41.7	+1.2
Conservative	E. A. Robinson	1,153	35.0	−0.1
SDP	R. C. Tweed	769	23.3	−1.0
Majority		223	6.8	+1.4
Turnout		3,298	42.1	−4.6
Labour hold		Swing		

1983
Party	Candidate	Votes	%	±%
Labour	C. H. Merry*	1,488	40.5	+0.5
Conservative	J. W. Robinson	1,290	35.1	+0.2
Alliance	R. C. Tweed	892	24.3	−0.8
Majority		198	5.4	+0.3
Turnout		3,670	46.7	+4.4
Labour hold		Swing		

1982
Party	Candidate	Votes	%	±%
Labour	R. Mee*	1,319	40.0	−10.9
Conservative	J. W. Robinson	1,152	34.9	+4.3
Liberal	H. M. Hughes	827	25.1	+6.6
Majority		167	5.1	−15.1
Turnout		3,298	42.3	−2.1
Labour hold		Swing		

1980
Party	Candidate	Votes	%	±%
Labour	B. Brotherton	1,780	50.9	+4.5
Conservative	R. Maley	1,072	30.6	−8.1
Liberal	A. C. Halliday	647	18.5	+3.6
Majority		708	20.2	+12.5
Turnout		3,499	44.4	−30.8
Labour gain from Conservative		Swing		

== Elections in the 1970s ==
1979
Party	Candidate	Votes	%	±%
Labour	C. H. Merry	2,319	46.4	−6.1
Conservative	A. Rhodes*	1,935	38.7	−8.8
Liberal	J. S. Green	743	14.9	+14.9
Majority		384	7.7	+2.7
Turnout		4,997	75.2	+34.3
Labour gain from Conservative		Swing		

1978
Party	Candidate	Votes	%	±%
Labour	R. Mee*	1,417	52.5	+8.9
Conservative	G. K. Toft	1,283	47.5	+3.6
Majority		134	5.0	+4.6
Turnout		2,700	40.9	−1.2
Labour hold		Swing		

1976
Party	Candidate	Votes	%	±%
Conservative	S. D. Turner	1,231	43.9	+1.5
Labour	B. Brotherton	1,221	43.6	+9.5
Liberal	B. Willshaw	301	10.7	−10.4
Communist	V. T. Eddisford	49	1.7	−0.6
Majority		10	0.4	−4.7
Turnout		2,802	42.1	+2.7
Conservative gain from Labour		Swing		

1975
Party	Candidate	Votes	%	±%
Conservative	A. Rhodes	1,105	42.4	
Labour	B. Brotherton*	888	34.1	
Liberal	M. Wood	550	21.1	
Communist	A. H. Burrage	61	2.3	
Majority		132	5.1	
Turnout		2,604	39.4	
Conservative gain from Labour		Swing		

1973
Party	Candidate	Votes	%	±%
Labour	R. Mee	1,345	53.8	
Labour	W. M. Phillips	1,344		
Labour	B. Brotherton	1,197		
Conservative	J. Hammond	1,043	41.8	
Conservative	E. Scarborough	1,028		
Conservative	G. Berry	987		
Communist	A. Barrage	110	4.4	
Majority		154		
Turnout		2,498	35.1	
Labour win (new seat)				
Labour win (new seat)				
Labour win (new seat)				
