= Hale (1974 Trafford ward) =

Former electoral ward of Trafford, Greater Manchester, England

- Former electoral ward for the Trafford Council
- Hale ward ward boundaries from 1980 to 2004
- Borough: Trafford
- County: Greater Manchester
- Major settlements: Hale, Hale Barns

Former electoral ward
- Created: 1974
- Abolished: 2004
- Number of members: 3

Hale was an electoral ward of Trafford covering the villages of Hale and Hale Barns.

The ward was abolished in 2004 and its area split between the new Hale Central and Hale Barns wards.

== Councillors ==
Election	Councillor	Councillor	Councillor
1973	Marjorie Hinchcliffe (Con)	Brian Adams (Con)	Roy Godwin (Con)
1975	Marjorie Hinchcliffe (Con)	Roy Godwin (Con)	Norman Barrett (Con)
1976	Marjorie Hinchcliffe (Con)	Roy Godwin (Con)	Norman Barrett (Con)
1978	Marjorie Hinchcliffe (Con)	Roy Godwin (Con)	Norman Barrett (Con)
1979	Marjorie Hinchcliffe (Con)	Roy Godwin (Con)	Norman Barrett (Con
1980	Marjorie Hinchcliffe (Con)	Roy Godwin (Con)	Norman Barrett (Con)
1982	Marjorie Hinchcliffe (Con)	Roy Godwin (Con)	Norman Barrett (Con)
1983	Marjorie Hinchcliffe (Con)	Roy Godwin (Con)	Norman Barrett (Con
1984	Marjorie Hinchcliffe (Con)	Roy Godwin (Con)	Norman Barrett (Con)
1986	Alan Roberts (Con)	Roy Godwin (Con)	Norman Barrett (Con)
1987	Alan Roberts (Con)	Roy Godwin (Con)	Norman Barrett (Con
1988	Alan Roberts (Con)	Roy Godwin (Con)	Norman Barrett (Con)
1990	Alan Roberts (Con)	Roy Godwin (Con)	Norman Barrett (Con)
1991	Alan Roberts (Con)	Roy Godwin (Con)	Patrick Myers (Con
1992	Alan Roberts (Con)	Roy Godwin (Con)	Patrick Myers (Con)
1994	Marilyn Lucas (Con)	Roy Godwin (Con)	Patrick Myers (Con)
1995	Marilyn Lucas (Con)	Roy Godwin (Con)	Patrick Myers (Con
1996	Marilyn Lucas (Con)	Barry Hepburn (Con)	Patrick Myers (Con)
1998	Ian Mullins (Con)	Barry Hepburn (Con)	Patrick Myers (Con)
1999	Ian Mullins (Con)	Barry Hepburn (Con)	Ralph Strafford (Con
2000	Ian Mullins (Con)	Barry Hepburn (Con)	Ralph Strafford (Con)
2002	Ian Mullins (Con)	Barry Hepburn (Con)	Ralph Strafford (Con)
2003	Ian Mullins (Con)	Barry Hepburn (Con)	Patricia Morris (Con
May 2004	Ian Mullins (Con)	Barry Hepburn (Lib Dem)	Patricia Morris (Con

== Elections in the 2000s ==
2003
Party	Candidate	Votes	%	±%
Conservative	Patricia Morris	3,078	64.5	−4.6
Labour	Beverly Harrison	794	16.7	−0.5
Liberal Democrats	Jane Weightman	676	14.2	+0.4
Green	Samuel Little	222	4.7	+4.7
Majority		2,288	47.8	−4.1
Turnout		4,770	57.1	−0.9
Conservative hold		Swing		

2002
Party	Candidate	Votes	%	±%
Conservative	Ian Mullins	3,333	69.1	−6.0
Labour	Beverly Harrison	828	17.2	+4.8
Liberal Democrats	Richard Elliott	664	13.8	+1.3
Majority		2,505	51.9	−10.7
Turnout		4,825	58.0	+24.2
Conservative hold		Swing		

2000
Party	Candidate	Votes	%	±%
Conservative	Barry Hepburn*	2,148	75.1	+8.3
Liberal Democrats	Christopher Gaskell	358	12.5	−7.5
Labour	Beverly Harrison	355	12.4	−0.8
Majority		1,790	62.6	+15.8
Turnout		2,861	33.8	−1.5
Conservative hold		Swing		

== Elections in the 1990s ==
1999
Party	Candidate	Votes	%	±%
Conservative	Strafford	1,998	66.8	−3.9
Liberal Democrats	Horstead	597	20.0	+5.0
Labour	McNee	395	13.2	−1.2
Majority		1,401	46.8	−8.9
Turnout		2,990	35.3	+1.3
Conservative hold		Swing		

1998
Party	Candidate	Votes	%	±%
Conservative	M. Lucas*	2,069	70.7	+11.0
Liberal Democrats	R. M. Elliott	438	15.0	−12.0
Labour	A. D . McNee	420	14.4	+1.1
Majority		1,631	55.7	+23.1
Turnout		2,927	34.0	−8.1
Conservative hold		Swing		

1996
Party	Candidate	Votes	%	±%
Conservative	B. L. Hepburn	2,119	59.7	+1.9
Liberal Democrats	C. S. Fink	960	27.0	−8.9
Labour	R. E. Lucas	473	13.3	−1.3
Majority		1,159	32.6	−0.7
Turnout		3,552	42.1	−2.2
Conservative hold		Swing		

1995
Party	Candidate	Votes	%	±%
Conservative	P. J. Myers*	2,012	57.8	+6.8
Liberal Democrats	C. S. Fink	1,251	35.9	−2.8
Labour	R. E. Lucas	509	14.6	+4.3
Majority		1,159	33.3	+21.0
Turnout		3,481	44.3	−1.9
Conservative hold		Swing		

1994
Party	Candidate	Votes	%	±%
Conservative	M. Lucas	2,015	51.0	−18.9
Liberal Democrats	C. S. Fink	1,528	38.7	+15.6
Labour	R. E. Lucas	409	10.3	+3.3
Majority		487	12.3	−34.5
Turnout		3,952	46.2	+3.5
Conservative hold		Swing		

1992
Party	Candidate	Votes	%	±%
Conservative	R. Godwin*	2,541	69.9	+2.1
Liberal Democrats	D. C. R. Horstead	840	23.1	+0.8
Labour	H. Baker	256	7.0	−2.9
Majority		1,701	46.8	+1.3
Turnout		3,637	42.7	−3.9
Conservative hold		Swing		

1991
Party	Candidate	Votes	%	±%
Conservative	P. J. Myers	2,714	67.8	−3.9
Liberal Democrats	D. C. R. Horstead	893	22.3	+13.3
Labour	R. E. Lucas	396	9.9	−4.8
Majority		1,821	45.5	−11.5
Turnout		4,003	46.6	−1.4
Conservative hold		Swing		

1990
Party	Candidate	Votes	%	±%
Conservative	R. A. Roberts*	3,002	71.7	−4.7
Labour	R. E. Lucas	616	14.7	+6.5
Liberal Democrats	F. A. Cameron	376	9.0	−3.5
Green	H. A. Eadie	190	4.5	+1.6
Majority		2,386	57.0	−6.8
Turnout		4,184	48.0	+4.5
Conservative hold		Swing		

== Elections in the 1980s ==
1988
Party	Candidate	Votes	%	±%
Conservative	R. Godwin*	2,930	76.4	+5.8
Liberal Democrats	G. P. Pawson	481	12.5	−9.3
Labour	R. E. Adams	314	8.2	+2.4
Green	J. J. Wharton	112	2.9	+1.0
Majority		2,449	63.8	+14.9
Turnout		3,837	43.5	−9.7
Conservative hold		Swing		

1987
Party	Candidate	Votes	%	±%
Conservative	N. W. Barrett*	3,359	70.6	+13.4
Liberal	G. P. Pawson	1,035	21.8	−12.3
Labour	G. P. F. Williams	274	5.8	−0.7
Green	J. J. Wharton	88	1.9	−0.3
Majority		2,324	48.9	+25.8
Turnout		4,756	53.2	+7.5
Conservative hold		Swing		

1986
Party	Candidate	Votes	%	±%
Conservative	R. A. Roberts	2,317	57.2	−5.7
Liberal	J. H. Mulholland	1,383	34.1	+5.6
Labour	C. E. Donegan	263	6.5	+0.4
Green	J. S. Menzies	88	2.2	−0.4
Majority		934	23.1	−11.3
Turnout		4,051	45.7	+1.5
Conservative hold		Swing		

1984
Party	Candidate	Votes	%	±%
Conservative	R. Godwin*	2,444	62.9	−6.3
Liberal	J. H. Mulholland	1,108	28.5	+5.5
Labour	M. A. Busteed	236	6.1	−1.7
Ecology	J. J. Wharton	100	2.6	+2.6
Majority		1,336	34.4	−11.8
Turnout		3,888	44.2	−4.2
Conservative hold		Swing		

1983
Party	Candidate	Votes	%	±%
Conservative	N. W. Barrett*	2,444	69.2	+3.1
Alliance	H. E. Bayliss	991	23.0	−4.7
Labour	K. O'Hagan	337	7.8	+1.6
Majority		1,994	46.2	+7.7
Turnout		4,313	48.4	+1.8
Conservative hold		Swing		

1982
Party	Candidate	Votes	%	±%
Conservative	M. Hinchcliffe*	2,709	66.1	−3.1
Liberal	J. Wilson	1,134	27.7	+5.0
Labour	E. A. Starkey	253	6.2	−1.9
Majority		1,575	38.5	−8.0
Turnout		4,096	46.6	+3.2
Conservative hold		Swing		

1980
Party	Candidate	Votes	%	±%
Conservative	R. Godwin*	2,596	69.2	−0.1
Liberal	C. G. Ball	852	22.7	+4.2
Labour	R. A. Tully	305	8.1	−4.1
Majority		1,744	46.5	−4.3
Turnout		3,753	43.4	−35.4
Conservative hold		Swing		

== Elections in the 1970s ==
1979
Party	Candidate	Votes	%	±%
Conservative	N. W. Barrett*	5,098	69.3	−6.4
Liberal	J. S. Whittingham	1,361	18.5	+5.0
Labour	O. J. Spencer	897	12.2	+1.4
Majority		3,737	50.8	−11.4
Turnout		7,356	78.8	+38.9
Conservative hold		Swing		

1978
Party	Candidate	Votes	%	±%
Conservative	M. Hinchcliffe*	2,812	75.7	−11.5
Liberal	J. S. Whittingham	501	13.5	+13.5
Labour	A. D. Johnson	400	10.8	−2.0
Majority		2,311	62.2	−12.2
Turnout		3,713	39.9	−7.5
Conservative hold		Swing		

1976
Party	Candidate	Votes	%	±%
Conservative	R. Godwin*	3,807	87.2	+1.5
Labour	P. Scott	560	12.8	+12.8
Majority		3,247	74.4	+46.9
Turnout		4,367	47.4	+3.8
Conservative hold		Swing		

1975 (2 vacancies)
Party	Candidate	Votes	%	±%
Conservative	N. W. Barrett	3,208	43.9	
Conservative	R. Godwin*	3,058	41.8	
Liberal	R. Allen	1,047	14.3	
Majority		2,011	27.5	
Turnout		7,313	43.6	
Conservative hold		Swing		
Conservative hold		Swing		

1973
Party	Candidate	Votes	%	±%
Conservative	M. Hinchcliffe	2,814	64.9	
Conservative	B. H. Adams	2,734		
Conservative	R. Godwin	2,726		
Liberal	C. Ball	1,016	23.4	
Liberal	B. Judson	941		
Liberal	R. Rivera	897		
Labour	J. Cope	508	11.7	
Labour	E. Donnelly	407		
Labour	M. Green	379		
Majority		1,710		
Turnout		4,338	44.9	
Conservative win (new seat)				
Conservative win (new seat)				
Conservative win (new seat)				
