= Beverley Hughes =

British politician

The Right Honourable The Baroness Hughes of Stretford PC
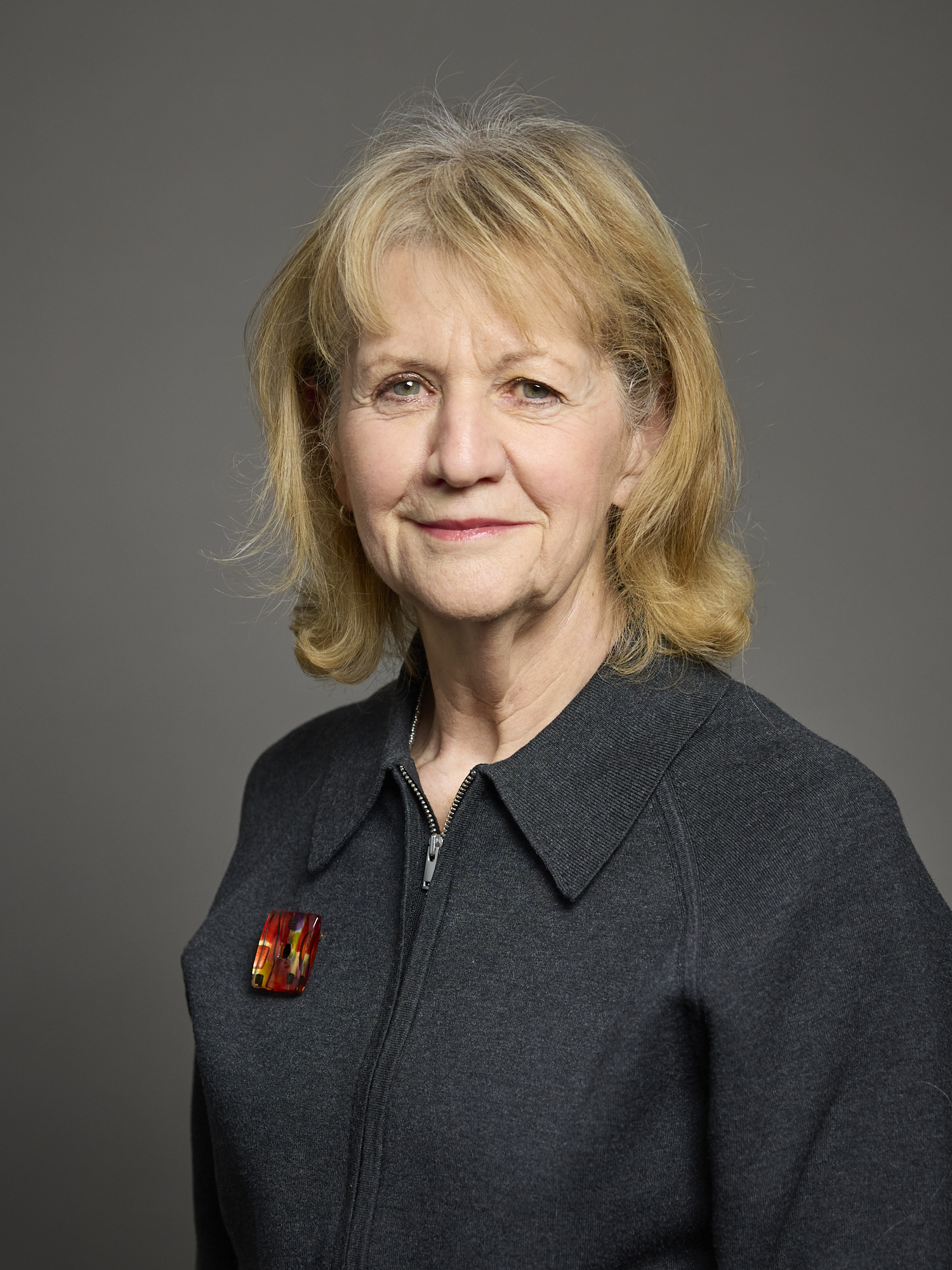
- Official portrait, 2025

Deputy Mayor of Greater Manchester for Policing and Crime
- In office 8 May 2017 – 9 January 2023
- Mayor: Andy Burnham
- Preceded by: Tony Lloyd (Note: As Police and Crime Commissioner.)
- Succeeded by: Kate Green

Minister of State for Children, Young People and Families
- In office 5 May 2005 – 5 June 2009
- Prime Minister: Tony Blair; Gordon Brown
- Preceded by: Maria Eagle
- Succeeded by: Dawn Primarolo

Minister for the North West
- In office 28 June 2007 – 5 June 2009
- Prime Minister: Gordon Brown
- Succeeded by: Phil Woolas

Minister of State for Counterterrorism
- In office 29 May 2002 – 1 April 2004
- Prime Minister: Tony Blair
- Preceded by: Office established
- Succeeded by: Hazel Blears

Minister of State for Immigration and Citizenship
- In office 29 May 2002 – 1 April 2004
- Prime Minister: Tony Blair
- Preceded by: The Lord Rooker
- Succeeded by: Des Browne

Parliamentary Under-Secretary of State for Home Affairs
- In office 7 June 2001 – 29 May 2002
- Prime Minister: Tony Blair
- Preceded by: The Lord Bassam of Brighton
- Succeeded by: The Lord Filkin

Parliamentary Under-Secretary of State for Environment, Transport and the Regions
- In office 29 July 1999 – 11 June 2001
- Prime Minister: Tony Blair
- Preceded by: Nick Raynsford
- Succeeded by: David Jamieson

Member of the House of Lords
- Lord Temporal
- Life peerage 15 July 2010

Member of Parliament for Stretford and Urmston
- In office 1 May 1997 – 12 April 2010
- Preceded by: Constituency established
- Succeeded by: Kate Green

Personal details
- Born: 30 March 1950 (age 76) Ellesmere Port, England
- Party: Labour
- Spouse: Thomas McDonald
- Education: University of Manchester; University of Liverpool
- Website: Official website

Beverley June Hughes, Baroness Hughes of Stretford PC (born 30 March 1950) is a British politician who most recently served as Deputy Mayor of Greater Manchester for Policing and Crime between 2017 and 2023. A member of the Labour Party, Hughes was the Member of Parliament (MP) for Stretford and Urmston from 1997 to 2010. In 2004, she was appointed to the Privy Council. From 2005 to 2009, she served in the Government as the Minister of State for Children, Young People and Families.

== Early life and education ==
Beverley Hughes was born in Ellesmere Port, Cheshire in 1950 and was educated at Ellesmere Port Girls' Grammar School (now called The Whitby High School) on Sycamore Drive in Whitby, Ellesmere Port. She moved to Flixton in 1976, and has lived there ever since.

Hughes studied for a BSc in Social Science at the University of Manchester, graduating in 1971. After graduation she continued her studies at the University of Manchester, carrying out postgraduate research into the care of people with schizophrenia, for which she was awarded a Master of Science degree in 1978. She also gained a Diploma in Applied Social Studies in 1974 from the University of Liverpool. She worked as a probation officer in Merseyside from 1971 to 1976.

From 1976 to 1997 Hughes worked first as a research associate, then lecturer (from 1981) and then a senior lecturer in the Department of Social Policy at the University of Manchester, a department that she became the head of in 1994.

== Political career ==
Hughes' political career began with election to Trafford Borough Council in 1986. She established herself, and was appointed leader of the council's Labour Group in 1992. She became Trafford Borough Council Leader in 1995, remaining in the post until her election to the UK Parliament at the 1997 general election.

From June 1997 to July 1998, she was a member of the Home Affairs Select Committee, until she was appointed Parliamentary Private Secretary to Hilary Armstrong, Minister for Local Government and Housing. In July 1999 she was appointed Parliamentary Under-Secretary of State in the Department of the Environment, Transport and the Regions. In 2001, she was appointed the Parliamentary Under-Secretary of State for Prisons and Probation in the Home Office.

In July 2001, she received significant ridicule and criticism in the media after it was revealed that along with other politicians she had repeatedly denounced an edition of the Channel 4 television show Brass Eye as being "unbelievably sick", but then subsequently admitting that she'd never seen it and refused to ever watch it. The programme was in fact parodying hysteria surrounding the issue of paedophilia and the media, thus commentators suggested that extreme reactions such as those by Hughes had in fact emphasised the need for such programming. Sir Paul Fox criticised Hughes and her colleagues suggesting they "have to have the courtesy to have seen the programme before they go in at the deep end", with Christopher Howse even more critical, suggesting "it was as if paedophilia were sacred and not to be blasphemed against" and that the idiocy of Hughes' performance on the affair was "hard to beat".

In 2002, Hughes was appointed Minister of State for Immigration, Citizenship and Counter Terrorism, but was forced to resign in April 2004 when it was shown that she had been informed of procedural improprieties concerning the granting of visas to certain categories of workers from Eastern Europe – she had earlier told the House of Commons that if she had been aware of such facts she would have done something about it.

Upon resignation, she made clear that she had not set out to "intentionally mislead anyone", but she could not "in conscience continue to serve as immigration minister". The prime minister replaced Hughes with Work and Pensions Minister Des Browne.

She was re-appointed into government after the 2005 general election as the Minister of State for Children, Young People and Families in the Department for Education and Skills. She became the Regional Minister for the North West as of 19 July 2007.

On 2 June 2009, Hughes announced she was resigning her ministerial position of Minister of State for Children, Young People and Families within that week following the Local and European elections with a cabinet reshuffle anticipated. She stood down at the 2010 General Election for "personal reasons" and specifically denied that she was standing down due to the ongoing expenses scandal. She was made a life peer on 15 July 2010 taking the title Baroness Hughes of Stretford, of Ellesmere Port in the County of Cheshire.

On 6 May 2017, Hughes was appointed as Deputy Mayor of Greater Manchester for Policing and Crime by Greater Manchester Combined Authority mayor, and former Shadow Home Secretary, Andy Burnham. On 9 January 2023 Hughes retired as Deputy Mayor, with Kate Green succeeding her.

== Personal life ==
She married Thomas McDonald in 1973 in West Cheshire and has three grown up children: one son and two daughters.

== Notes ==
Parliament of the United Kingdom
| New constituency | Member of Parliament for Stretford and Urmston; 1997–2010 | Succeeded by Kate Green |
Political offices
| Preceded by The Lord Rooker as Minister of State for Asylum and Immigration | Minister of State for Immigration, Citizenship and Counterterrorism; 2002–2004 | Succeeded by Des Browne |
| Preceded by Maria Eagle as Undersecretary of State for Children and Families | Minister of State for Children, Young People and Families; 2005–2009 | Succeeded by Dawn Primarolo |
| New office | Deputy Mayor of Greater Manchester for Policing and Crime; 2017–2023 | Succeeded by Kate Green |
