= 2000 Trafford Metropolitan Borough Council election =

2000 UK local government election

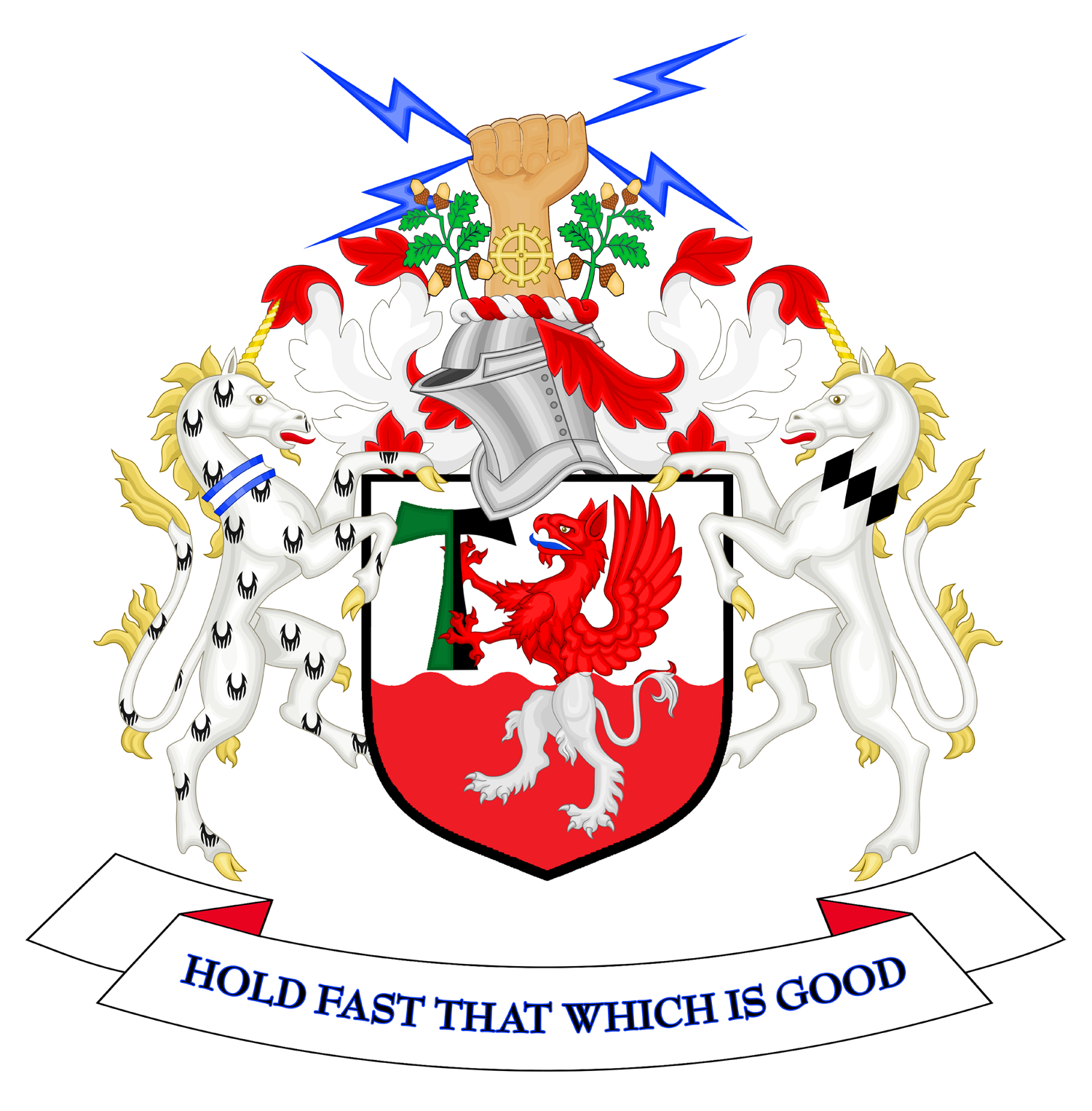
- 4 May 2000

21 of 63 seats to Trafford Metropolitan Borough Council 32 seats needed for a majority
	First party	Second party	Third party
Leader	David Acton	Frank Eadie	Brenda Ackroyd
Party	Labour	Conservative	Liberal Democrats
Leader's seat	Urmston	Davyhulme East	Village
Last election	11 seats, 41.5%	9 seats, 45.5%	1 seats, 12.4%
Seats before	33	25	3
Seats won	10	10	1
Seats after	33	26	3
Seat change	Steady	▲1	Steady
Popular vote	20,410	28,389	6,108
Percentage	37.0%	51.5%	11.1%
Swing	▼4.5%	▲6.0%	▼1.3%
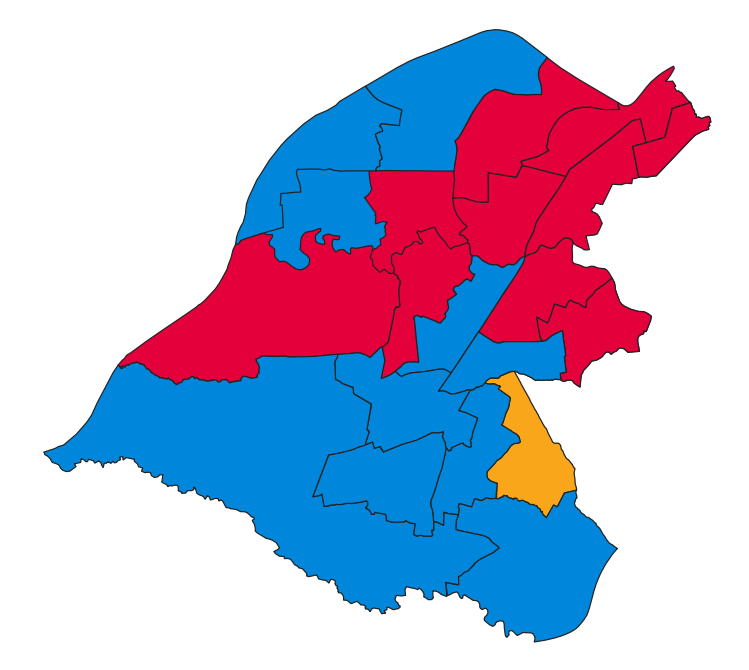
- Map of results of 2000 election
Leader of the Council before election
David Acton
Labour
Leader of the Council after election
David Acton
Labour

Elections to Trafford Council were held on 4 May 2000. One third of the council was up for election, with each successful candidate to serve a four-year term of office, expiring in 2004. The Labour Party held overall control of the council.

== Election results ==
Party	Votes		Seats			Full Council	
Labour Party	20,410 (37.0%)	▼4.5	10 (47.6%)	10 / 21	Steady	33 (52.4%)	33 / 63
Conservative Party	28,389 (51.5%)	▲6.0	10 (47.6%)	10 / 21	▲1	26 (41.3%)	26 / 63
Liberal Democrats	6,108 (11.1%)	▼1.3	1 (4.8%)	1 / 21	Steady	3 (4.8%)	3 / 63
Independent	201 (0.4%)	N/A	0 (0.0%)	0 / 21	▼1	1 (1.6%)	1 / 63

↓
33	3	1	26

== Ward results ==
=== Altrincham ===
Altrincham
Party	Candidate	Votes	%	±%
Conservative	Paula Pearson	1,689	59.1	+9.2
Labour	David Armstrong	774	27.1	−16.0
Independent	Sheila O'Bierne*	201	7.0	+7.0
Liberal Democrats	Roger Legge	193	6.8	−0.2
Majority		915	32.0	+25.2
Turnout		2,857	32.4	−5.9
Conservative gain from Independent		Swing		

=== Bowdon ===
Bowdon
Party	Candidate	Votes	%	±%
Conservative	David Merrell*	2,219	73.0	+3.5
Liberal Democrats	Christine Musgrove	445	14.6	+1.1
Labour	Peter Dunnico	375	12.3	−4.8
Majority		1,774	58.4	+6.0
Turnout		3,039	32.5	−0.4
Conservative hold		Swing		

=== Broadheath ===
Broadheath
Party	Candidate	Votes	%	±%
Conservative	Kenneth Weston	1,588	48.6	+5.1
Labour	Joanne Bennett	1,435	43.9	−4.8
Liberal Democrats	Alan Brookes	243	7.4	−0.4
Majority		153	4.7	
Turnout		3,266	37.5	+0.4
Conservative hold		Swing		

=== Brooklands ===
Brooklands
Party	Candidate	Votes	%	±%
Conservative	Kathleen Bullock	1,986	66.3	+5.2
Labour	Ian McDermott	618	20.6	−6.2
Liberal Democrats	Kenneth Clarke	393	13.1	+1.0
Majority		1,368	45.7	+11.4
Turnout		2,997	37.9	+1.1
Conservative hold		Swing		

=== Bucklow ===
Bucklow
Party	Candidate	Votes	%	±%
Labour	Harry Faulkner*	800	72.7	−8.0
Conservative	Alexander Kelly	300	27.3	+13.3
Majority		500	45.4	−21.3
Turnout		1,100	18.6	−1.2
Labour hold		Swing		

=== Clifford ===
Clifford
Party	Candidate	Votes	%	±%
Labour	Andrea Jones	1,278	75.9	+11.4
Conservative	Elliott Wood	297	17.6	+5.0
Liberal Democrats	John Hunter	109	6.5	+2.7
Majority		981	58.3	+12.9
Turnout		1,684	22.4	−3.2
Labour hold		Swing		

=== Davyhulme East ===
Davyhulme East
Party	Candidate	Votes	%	±%
Conservative	Frank Eadie*	1,587	67.1	+6.4
Labour	Jeanette McLaughlin	780	33.0	−2.0
Majority		807	34.1	+8.4
Turnout		2,367	32.5	+0.1
Conservative hold		Swing		

=== Davyhulme West ===
Davyhulme West
Party	Candidate	Votes	%	±%
Conservative	John Ackerley*	1,931	63.0	+14.7
Labour	Karina Carter	1,135	37.0	−10.9
Majority		796	26.0	+25.6
Turnout		3,066	40.2	−1.3
Conservative hold		Swing		

=== Flixton ===
Flixton
Party	Candidate	Votes	%	±%
Conservative	Vivienne Ward*	1,755	60.5	+11.3
Labour	Jennifer Carroll	1,148	39.6	−5.6
Majority		607	20.9	+16.9
Turnout		2,903	38.0	−4.4
Conservative hold		Swing		

=== Hale ===
Hale
Party	Candidate	Votes	%	±%
Conservative	Barry Hepburn*	2,148	75.1	+8.3
Liberal Democrats	Christopher Gaskell	358	12.5	−7.5
Labour	Beverly Harrison	355	12.4	−0.8
Majority		1,790	62.6	+15.8
Turnout		2,861	33.8	−1.5
Conservative hold		Swing		

=== Longford ===
Longford
Party	Candidate	Votes	%	±%
Labour	Margaret Barker	1,393	54.5	+0.8
Conservative	Keith Summerfield	1,164	45.5	+5.3
Majority		229	9.0	−4.5
Turnout		2,557	34.6	+3.9
Labour hold		Swing		

=== Mersey-St. Mary's ===
Mersey St. Marys
Party	Candidate	Votes	%	±%
Conservative	John Tolhurst*	2,048	64.8	+6.1
Labour	Tamira Rasul	720	22.8	−9.3
Liberal Democrats	Graham Rogers	395	12.5	+3.3
Majority		1,328	42.0	+15.5
Turnout		3,163	32.5	−1.2
Conservative hold		Swing		

=== Park ===
Park
Party	Candidate	Votes	%	±%
Labour	Justine Williams*	835	55.4	−4.0
Conservative	Pervez Nakvi	672	44.6	+10.9
Majority		153	10.8	−14.9
Turnout		1,507	24.8	+1.0
Labour hold		Swing		

=== Priory ===
Priory
Party	Candidate	Votes	%	±%
Labour	Roland Griffin*	1,560	49.0	+0.8
Conservative	Alexander Williams	1,077	33.9	−1.5
Liberal Democrats	Michael Riley	545	17.1	+0.7
Majority		483	15.1	+2.3
Turnout		3,182	40.9	+4.3
Labour hold		Swing		

=== Sale Moor ===
Sale Moor
Party	Candidate	Votes	%	±%
Labour	Helen Busteed*	1,143	44.5	−4.6
Conservative	Marjorie Hepburn	1,121	43.7	+6.2
Liberal Democrats	Derek Hurst	303	11.8	−1.6
Majority		22	0.8	−10.8
Turnout		2,567	33.6	+2.1
Labour hold		Swing		

=== St. Martin's ===
St. Martins
Party	Candidate	Votes	%	±%
Labour	Angela Gray	1,153	45.5	−9.1
Conservative	William Cole	1,140	45.0	+8.7
Liberal Democrats	Richard Elliott	241	9.5	+0.4
Majority		13	0.5	−17.8
Turnout		2,535	29.9	+3.8
Labour hold		Swing		

=== Stretford ===
Stretford
Party	Candidate	Votes	%	±%
Labour	Paul Dolan*	1,406	56.9	−0.6
Conservative	John Schofield	1,066	43.1	+5.2
Majority		340	13.8	−5.8
Turnout		2,472	32.5	−1.4
Labour hold		Swing		

=== Talbot ===
Talbot
Party	Candidate	Votes	%	±%
Labour	Laurence Walsh	906	66.6	−9.7
Conservative	Colin Levenston	349	25.6	+7.6
Liberal Democrats	Hazel Shacklock	106	7.8	+2.1
Majority		557	41.0	−17.3
Turnout		1,361	21.5	−0.3
Labour hold		Swing		

=== Timperley ===
Timperley
Party	Candidate	Votes	%	±%
Conservative	Arthur Davies*	1,611	53.5	+7.3
Liberal Democrats	Catherine Smith	845	28.0	−1.5
Labour	Mary Atherton	558	18.5	−5.9
Majority		766	25.5	+8.8
Turnout		3,014	34.0	−1.2
Conservative hold		Swing		

=== Urmston ===
Urmston
Party	Candidate	Votes	%	±%
Labour	William Clarke*	1,679	53.9	+2.2
Conservative	David Nicklin	1,439	46.2	+3.1
Majority		240	7.7	−0.9
Turnout		3,118	41.3	+4.6
Labour hold		Swing		

=== Village ===
Village
Party	Candidate	Votes	%	±%
Liberal Democrats	Raymond Bowker*	1,932	55.3	+6.3
Conservative	Ian Mullins	1,202	34.4	−0.2
Labour	Andrew McNee	359	10.3	−6.1
Majority		730	20.9	+6.5
Turnout		3,493	38.1	+2.5
Liberal Democrats hold		Swing		
