= Clifford (ward) =

Electoral ward of Trafford, Greater Manchester, England

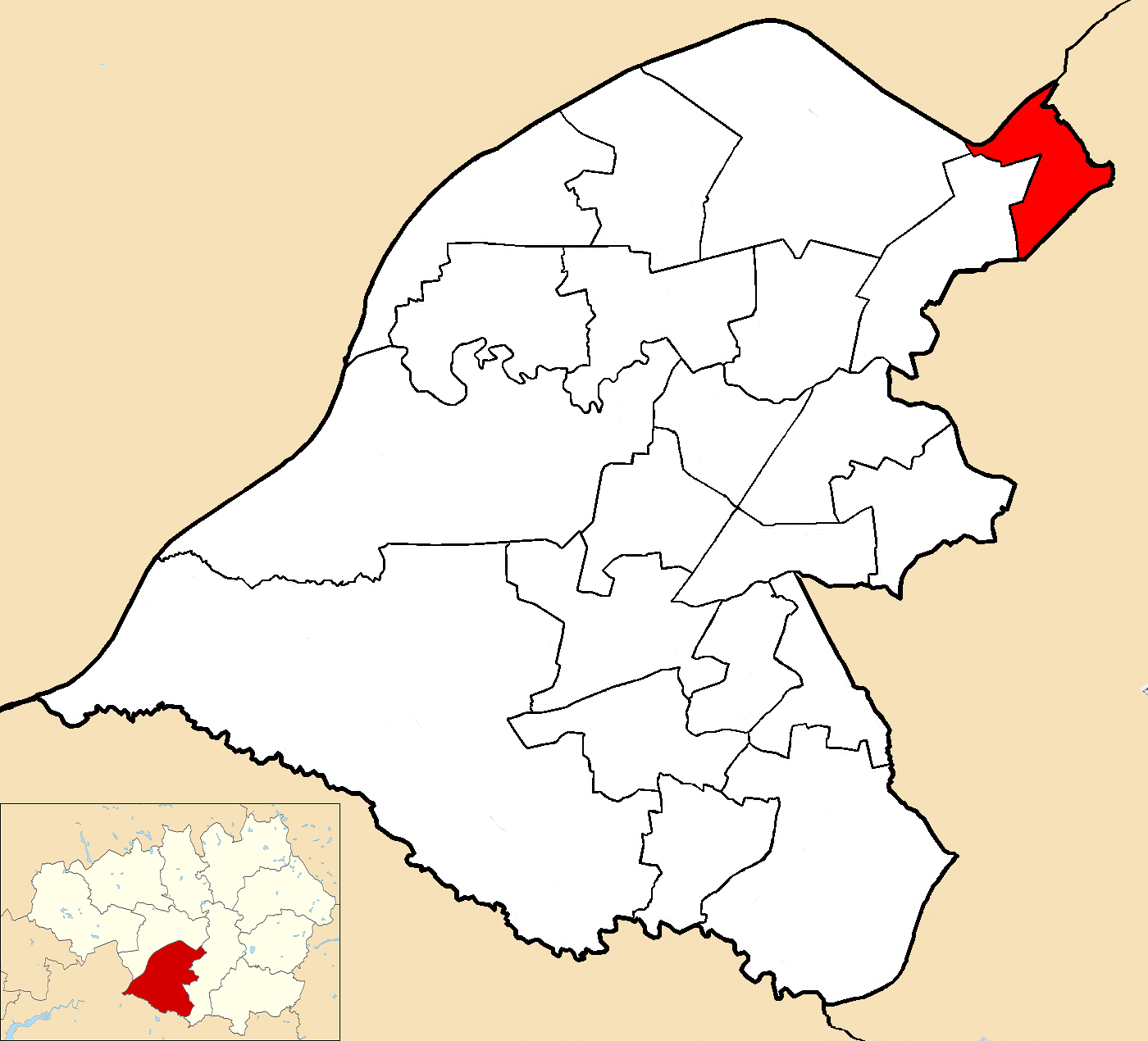
- Clifford within Trafford
- Population: 12,003
- Metropolitan borough: Trafford
- Metropolitan county: Greater Manchester
- Country: England
- Sovereign state: United Kingdom
- UK Parliament: Stretford and Urmston

Clifford was an electoral ward of Trafford, Greater Manchester, covering most of the Old Trafford area of Stretford. It is the north-easternmost ward of Trafford and is bordered to the west by the Longford and Gorse Hill wards. It was replaced by Old Trafford ward in 2023.

== Councillors ==
In 2022, the councillors were Sophie Taylor (Labour), Akilah Akinola (Labour), and Waseem Hassan (Labour).

Election	Councillor	Councillor	Councillor
1973	H. Davies (Lab)	V. Wynne (Lab)	Ray Tully (Lab)
1975	H. Davies (Lab)	V. Wynne (Lab)	R. Corke (Con)
1976	H. Davies (Lab)	V. Wynne (Lab)	R. Corke (Con)
1978	Keith Summerfield (Con)	V. Wynne (Lab)	R. Corke (Con)
1979	Keith Summerfield (Con)	Tony Lloyd (Lab)	Sean Maher (Lab)
1980	Keith Summerfield (Con)	Tony Lloyd (Lab)	Sean Maher (Lab)
1982	Pat Geoghegan (Lab)	Tony Lloyd (Lab)	Sean Maher (Lab)
1983	Pat Geoghegan (Lab)	Tony Lloyd (Lab)	Sean Maher (Lab)
1984	Pat Geoghegan (Lab)	Sean Rogers (Lab)	Sean Maher (Lab)
1986	Brendan Sheehan (Lab)	Sean Rogers (Lab)	Sean Maher (Lab)
1987	Brendan Sheehan (Lab)	Sean Rogers (Lab)	Sean Maher (Lab)
1988	Brendan Sheehan (Lab)	Sean Rogers (Lab)	Sean Maher (Lab)
1990	Mary Atherton (Lab)	Sean Rogers (Lab)	Sean Maher (Lab)
1991	Mary Atherton (Lab)	Sean Rogers (Lab)	Sean Maher (Lab)
1992	Mary Atherton (Lab)	Sean Rogers (Lab)	Sean Maher (Lab)
Dec 1993	Mary Atherton (Lab)	Sean Rogers (Lab)	Whit Stennett (Lab)
1994	Peter Mitchell (Lab)	Sean Rogers (Lab)	Whit Stennett (Lab)
1995	Peter Mitchell (Lab)	Sean Rogers (Lab)	Whit Stennett (Lab)
1996	Peter Mitchell (Lab)	P. Dunnico (Lab)	Whit Stennett (Lab)
1998	Peter Mitchell (Lab)	P. Dunnico (Lab)	Whit Stennett (Lab)
1999	Peter Mitchell (Lab)	P. Dunnico (Lab)	Whit Stennett (Lab)
2000	Peter Mitchell (Lab)	Andrea Jones (Lab)	Whit Stennett (Lab)
2002	Peter Mitchell (Lab)	Andrea Jones (Lab)	Whit Stennett (Lab)
2003	Peter Mitchell (Lab)	Andrea Jones (Lab)	Whit Stennett (Lab)
2004	Whit Stennett (Lab)	Ejaz Malik (Lab)	Andrea Jones (Lab)
2006	Whit Stennett (Lab)	Ejaz Malik (Lab)	Andrea Jones (Lab)
2007	Whit Stennett (Lab)	Ejaz Malik (Lab)	Andrea Jones (Lab)
2008	Whit Stennett (Lab)	Ejaz Malik (Lab)	Sophie Taylor (Lab)
2010	Whit Stennett (Lab)	Ejaz Malik (Lab)	Sophie Taylor (Lab)
2011	Whit Stennett (Lab)	Ejaz Malik (Lab)	Sophie Taylor (Lab)
2012	Whit Stennett (Lab)	Ejaz Malik (Lab)	Sophie Taylor (Lab)
2014	Whit Stennett (Lab)	Ejaz Malik (Lab)	Sophie Taylor (Lab)
2015	Whit Stennett (Lab)	Ejaz Malik (Lab)	Sophie Taylor (Lab)
2016	Whit Stennett (Lab)	Ejaz Malik (Lab)	Sophie Taylor (Lab)
2018	Whit Stennett (Lab)	Ejaz Malik (Lab)	Sophie Taylor (Lab)
2019	Whit Stennett (Lab)	Akilah Akinola (Lab)	Sophie Taylor (Lab)
2021	Waseem Hassan (Lab)	Akilah Akinola (Lab)	Sophie Taylor (Lab)
2022	Waseem Hassan (Lab)	Akilah Akinola (Lab)	Sophie Taylor (Lab)

indicates seat up for re-election. indicates seat up for election following resignation of sitting councillor.

== Elections in the 2020s ==
=== May 2022 ===
2022
Party	Candidate	Votes	%	±%
Labour	Sophie Taylor*	2,288	79.0	
Green	Jess Mayo	353	12.2	
Conservative	Limna Lijo	155	5.4	
Liberal Democrats	John Reyes	85	2.9	
Majority		1,935	66.8	
Registered electors		9,144		
Turnout		2,897	31.7	
Labour hold		Swing		

=== May 2021 ===
2021
Party	Candidate	Votes	%	±%
Labour	Waseem Hassan	2,650	75.4	▼3.8
Green	Jess Mayo	469	13.3	▲1.6
Conservative	Christopher Halliday	254	7.2	▲0.7
Liberal Democrats	Andrew Hick	103	2.9	▲0.8
Majority		2,181	62.0	▼5.5
Rejected ballots		39		
Registered electors		9,053		
Turnout		3,515	38.8	▼1.5
Labour hold		Swing	▼2.7	

== Elections in the 2010s ==
=== May 2019 ===
2019
Party	Candidate	Votes	%	±%
Labour	Akilah Akinola	2,375	79.1	▼5.2
Green	Jess Mayo	378	12.6	▲4.6
Conservative	Alex Finney	155	5.2	▲0.1
Liberal Democrats	Dave Nicholson	93	3.0	▲0.4
Majority		1,997	66.5	▼9.9
Registered electors		8,351		
Turnout		3,001	36.07	▼3.23
Labour hold		Swing		

=== May 2018 ===
2018
Party	Candidate	Votes	%	±%
Labour	Sophie Taylor*	2,702	84.3	+4.7
Green	Jess Mayo	255	8.0	−3.8
Conservative	Alex Finney	165	5.1	−1.4
Liberal Democrats	Pauline Cliff	82	2.6	+0.5
Majority		2,447	76.4	+8.6
Turnout		3,204	39.3	−1.0
Labour hold		Swing		

=== May 2016 ===
2016
Party	Candidate	Votes	%	±%
Labour	Eunice Stennett*	2,374	79.2	+7.4
Green	Jessica Mayo	351	11.7	−6.3
Conservative	Alexander Finney	195	6.5	−3.2
Liberal Democrats	Simon Wright	63	2.1	+2.1
Majority		2,023	67.5	+13.7
Turnout		2,998	40.3	−24.1
Labour hold		Swing		

=== May 2015 ===
2015
Party	Candidate	Votes	%	±%
Labour	Ejaz Malik*	3,504	72.2	−4.0
Green	Jess Mayo	877	18.1	+6.4
Conservative	Chacko Luke	471	9.7	+1.6
Majority		2,627	54.1	−10.4
Turnout		4,852	64.4	+24.8
Labour hold		Swing		

=== May 2014 ===
2014
Party	Candidate	Votes	%	±%
Labour	Sophie Taylor*	2,206	75.2	−4.6
Green	Matthew Westbrook	401	13.7	+2.6
Conservative	Asha Thomas	246	8.3	+1.5
Liberal Democrats	Louise Bird	81	2.8	+0.5
Majority		1,805	61.5	−7.1
Turnout		2,933	46.1	+10.7
Labour hold		Swing		

=== May 2012 ===
2012
Party	Candidate	Votes	%	±%
Labour	Whit Stennett*	2,035	79.8	+3.6
Green	Anne Power	284	11.1	−0.6
Conservative	James Heywood	173	6.8	−1.3
Liberal Democrats	Louise Bird	59	2.3	−1.7
Majority		1,751	68.6	+4.1
Turnout		2,551	35.4	−4.2
Labour hold		Swing		

=== May 2011 ===
2011
Party	Candidate	Votes	%	±%
Labour	Ejaz Malik*	2,310	76.2	+9.3
Green	Anne Power	354	11.7	+4.5
Conservative	Alex Finney	247	8.1	−0.2
Liberal Democrats	Alan Sherliker	121	4.0	−13.6
Majority		1,956	64.5	+15.2
Turnout		3,032	39.6	−22.8
Labour hold		Swing		

=== May 2010 ===
2010
Party	Candidate	Votes	%	±%
Labour	Sophie Taylor*	3,192	66.9	+7.8
Liberal Democrats	Simon Wright	840	17.6	+6.8
Conservative	Lee Peck	395	8.3	−6.4
Green	Anne Power	343	7.2	−8.2
Majority		2,352	49.3	+12.0
Turnout		4,770	62.4	+29.8
Labour hold		Swing		

== Elections in the 2000s ==
=== May 2008 ===
2008
Party	Candidate	Votes	%	±%
Labour	Whit Stennett*	1,434	32.0	+4.8
Labour	Sophie Taylor	1,212	27.1	−5.0
Green	Christine Rawson	377	8.4	+1.5
Conservative	John Schofield	338	7.6	+2.5
Conservative	John Blackburn	318	7.1	+1.5
Green	Anne Power	313	7.0	−1.3
Liberal Democrats	Louise Bird	264	5.9	−1.1
Liberal Democrats	Derek Hurst	220	4.9	−3.1
Majority		835	37.3	−6.6
Turnout		4,476	32.6	−0.8
Labour hold		Swing		
Labour hold		Swing		

=== May 2007 ===
2007
Party	Candidate	Votes	%	±%
Labour	Ejaz Malik*	1,364	59.2	−4.8
Green	Sarah Bailey	352	15.3	−3.9
Liberal Democrats	Matthew Adams	297	12.9	+12.9
Conservative	Eleanor Heaton	292	12.7	−4.0
Majority		1,012	43.9	−0.9
Turnout		2,305	33.4	+1.5
Labour hold		Swing		

=== May 2006 ===
2006
Party	Candidate	Votes	%	±%
Labour	Andrea Jones*	1,375	64.0	+17.7
Green	Anne Power	413	19.2	+7.5
Conservative	Edward Kelson	359	16.7	+5.7
Majority		962	44.8	+32.9
Turnout		2,147	31.9	−9.8
Labour hold		Swing		

=== May 2004 ===
2004 (after boundary changes)
Party	Candidate	Votes	%	±%
Labour	Eunice Stennett*	1,155	16.0	
Labour	Ejaz Malik	1,122	15.5	
Labour	Andrea Jones*	1,071	14.8	
Liberal Democrats	Mohammad Butt	785	10.9	
Liberal Democrats	Victor De Souza	741	10.2	
Liberal Democrats	Choudhrry Yousaf	704	9.7	
Green	John Westbrook	350	4.8	
Green	Bridget Green	289	4.0	
Conservative	John Gregory	288	4.0	
Conservative	Shirley Dirikis	269	3.6	
Conservative	Martin Massey	248	3.4	
Green	Samuel Little	212	2.9	
Turnout		7,234	41.7	
Labour win (new seat)				
Labour win (new seat)				
Labour win (new seat)				

=== May 2003 ===
2003
Party	Candidate	Votes	%	±%
Labour	Eunice Stennett*	1,714	55.3	−20.5
Green	Anne Power	854	27.6	+17.7
Conservative	Roderick Allan	532	17.2	+2.8
Majority		860	27.7	−33.7
Turnout		3,100	41.9	+1.9
Labour hold		Swing		

=== May 2002 ===
2002
Party	Candidate	Votes	%	±%
Labour	Peter Mitchell*	2,256	75.8	−0.1
Conservative	Alexander Kelly	428	14.4	−3.2
Green	Anne Power	294	9.9	+9.9
Majority		1,828	61.4	+3.1
Turnout		2,978	40.0	+17.6
Labour hold		Swing		

=== May 2000 ===
2000
Party	Candidate	Votes	%	±%
Labour	Andrea Jones	1,278	75.9	+11.4
Conservative	Elliott Wood	297	17.6	+5.0
Liberal Democrats	John Hunter	109	6.5	+2.7
Majority		981	58.3	+12.9
Turnout		1,684	22.4	−3.2
Labour hold		Swing		

== Elections in the 1990s ==
1999
Party	Candidate	Votes	%	±%
Labour	Stennett*	1,225	64.5	−4.1
Socialist Labour	Ali	362	19.1	+19.1
Conservative	Wood	240	12.6	−0.1
Liberal Democrats	Hunter	72	3.8	+3.8
Majority		863	45.4	−4.5
Turnout		1,899	25.6	−1.9
Labour hold		Swing		

1998
Party	Candidate	Votes	%	±%
Labour	P. W. Mitchell*	1,384	68.6	+3.8
Independent	M. Ali	377	18.7	+1.0
Conservative	L. G. Peck	256	12.7	−4.8
Majority		1,007	49.9	+2.9
Turnout		2,017	27.5	−1.7
Labour hold		Swing		

1996
Party	Candidate	Votes	%	±%
Labour	P. A. Dunnico	1,367	64.8	−15.9
Independent	M. Ali	374	17.7	+17.7
Conservative	A. J. McDonald	370	17.5	−1.8
Majority		993	47.0	−14.5
Turnout		2,111	29.2	−3.8
Labour hold		Swing		

1995
Party	Candidate	Votes	%	±%
Labour	E. W. Stennett*	2,122	80.7	+3.9
Conservative	W. R. Monaghan	506	19.3	+1.6
Majority		1,616	61.5	+2.4
Turnout		2,628	33.0	+1.9
Labour hold		Swing		

1994
Party	Candidate	Votes	%	±%
Labour	P. W. Mitchell	1,879	76.8	+14.7
Conservative	J. M. Ansari	434	17.7	−14.5
Green	D. W. Alexander	134	5.5	−0.2
Majority		1,445	59.1	+29.2
Turnout		2,447	31.1	+4.2
Labour hold		Swing		

By-Election 16 December 1993
Party	Candidate	Votes	%	±%
Labour	E. W. Stennett	1,207	78.8	+16.7
Conservative	C. H. Davenport	226	14.8	−17.4
Liberal Democrats	F. C. Beswick	99	6.5	+6.5
Majority		981	64.0	+34.1
Turnout		1,532	17.9	
Labour hold		Swing		

1992
Party	Candidate	Votes	%	±%
Labour	S. Rogers*	1,317	62.1	−9.6
Conservative	M. T. Wyne	683	32.2	+3.9
Green	D. W. Alexander	120	5.7	+5.7
Majority		634	29.9	−13.5
Turnout		2,120	26.9	−7.3
Labour hold		Swing		

1991
Party	Candidate	Votes	%	±%
Labour	J. S. Maher*	1,944	71.7	6.0
Conservative	M. T. Wyne	767	28.3	+6.0
Majority		1,177	43.4	−12.1
Turnout		2,711	34.2	−5.4
Labour hold		Swing		

1990
Party	Candidate	Votes	%	±%
Labour	M. E. Atherton	2,474	77.7	+2.9
Conservative	M. T. Wyne	709	22.3	−2.9
Majority		1,765	55.5	+5.8
Turnout		3,183	39.6	+1.8
Labour hold		Swing		

== Elections in the 1980s ==
1988
Party	Candidate	Votes	%	±%
Labour	S. Rogers*	2,379	74.8	+2.4
Conservative	M. T. Wyne	800	25.2	−2.4
Majority		1,579	49.7	+4.8
Turnout		3,179	37.8	−0.9
Labour hold		Swing		

1987
Party	Candidate	Votes	%	±%
Labour	J. S. Maher*	2,452	72.4	−4.7
Conservative	M. T. Wyne	933	27.6	+4.7
Majority		1,519	44.9	−9.2
Turnout		3,385	38.7	+5.2
Labour hold		Swing		

1986
Party	Candidate	Votes	%	±%
Labour	B. M. Sheehan	2,285	77.1	+6.1
Conservative	M. Howard	680	22.9	−6.1
Majority		1,605	54.1	+12.1
Turnout		2,965	33.5	−4.2
Labour hold		Swing		

1984
Party	Candidate	Votes	%	±%
Labour	S. Rogers	2,306	71.0	+12.5
Conservative	P. S. G. Westwell	943	29.0	−2.1
Majority		1,363	42.0	+14.7
Turnout		3,249	37.7	−5.6
Labour hold		Swing		

1983
Party	Candidate	Votes	%	±%
Labour	J. S. Maher*	2,141	58.5	+4.7
Conservative	G. V. Burrows	1,140	31.1	−0.2
Alliance	W. C. Sumner	379	10.4	−4.5
Majority		1,001	27.3	+4.7
Turnout		3,660	43.3	+2.4
Labour hold		Swing		

1982
Party	Candidate	Votes	%	±%
Labour	P. J. Geoghegan	1,830	53.8	−12.9
Conservative	G. V. Burrows	1,063	31.3	−2.0
SDP	W. C. Sumner	506	14.9	+14.9
Majority		767	22.6	−10.8
Turnout		3,399	40.9	−2.3
Labour gain from Conservative		Swing		

1980
Party	Candidate	Votes	%	±%
Labour	A. J. Lloyd*	2,241	66.7	+15.3
Conservative	T. J. Lamb	1,119	33.3	−2.9
Majority		1,122	33.4	+30.3
Turnout		3,360	43.2	−16.9
Labour hold		Swing		

== Elections in the 1970s ==
1979
Party	Candidate	Votes	%	±%
Labour	J. S. Maher	2,129	26.1	+2.2
Labour	A. J. Lloyd	2,066	25.3	+0.6
Conservative	R. W. Corke*	1,809	22.1	−5.9
Conservative	M. Shafi	1,154	14.1	−21.9
Liberal	D. A. Curley	563	6.9	+13.8
Liberal	A. Scanlon	451	5.5	+11.0
Majority		257	3.1	+3.1
Turnout		8,172	60.1	+20.5
Labour gain from Conservative		Swing		
Labour hold		Swing		

1978
Party	Candidate	Votes	%	±%
Conservative	K. G. Summerfield	1,319	50.0	+7.2
Labour	J. S. Maher	1,318	50.0	+0.4
Majority		1	0.03	−6.7
Turnout		2,637	39.6	−1.9
Conservative gain from Labour		Swing		

1976
Party	Candidate	Votes	%	±%
Labour	V. J. Wynne*	1,355	49.6	+6.8
Conservative	E. J. Kelson	1,172	42.9	−14.3
Liberal	R. N. Stott	206	7.5	+7.5
Majority		183	6.7	−7.6
Turnout		2,733	41.5	+6.6
Labour hold		Swing		

1975
Party	Candidate	Votes	%	±%
Conservative	R. W. Corke	1,309	57.2	
Labour	J. S. Maher	981	42.8	
Majority		328	14.3	
Turnout		2,290	34.9	
Conservative gain from Labour		Swing		

1973
Party	Candidate	Votes	%	±%
Labour	H. Davies	1,445	55.3	
Labour	V. J. Wynne	1,346		
Labour	R. A. Tully	1,295		
Conservative	R. Corke	1,169	44.7	
Conservative	E. Kelson	1,123		
Conservative	K. Pulford	1,095		
Majority		126		
Turnout		2,614	36.9	
Labour win (new seat)				
Labour win (new seat)				
Labour win (new seat)				
