= 1998 Trafford Metropolitan Borough Council election =

1998 UK local government election

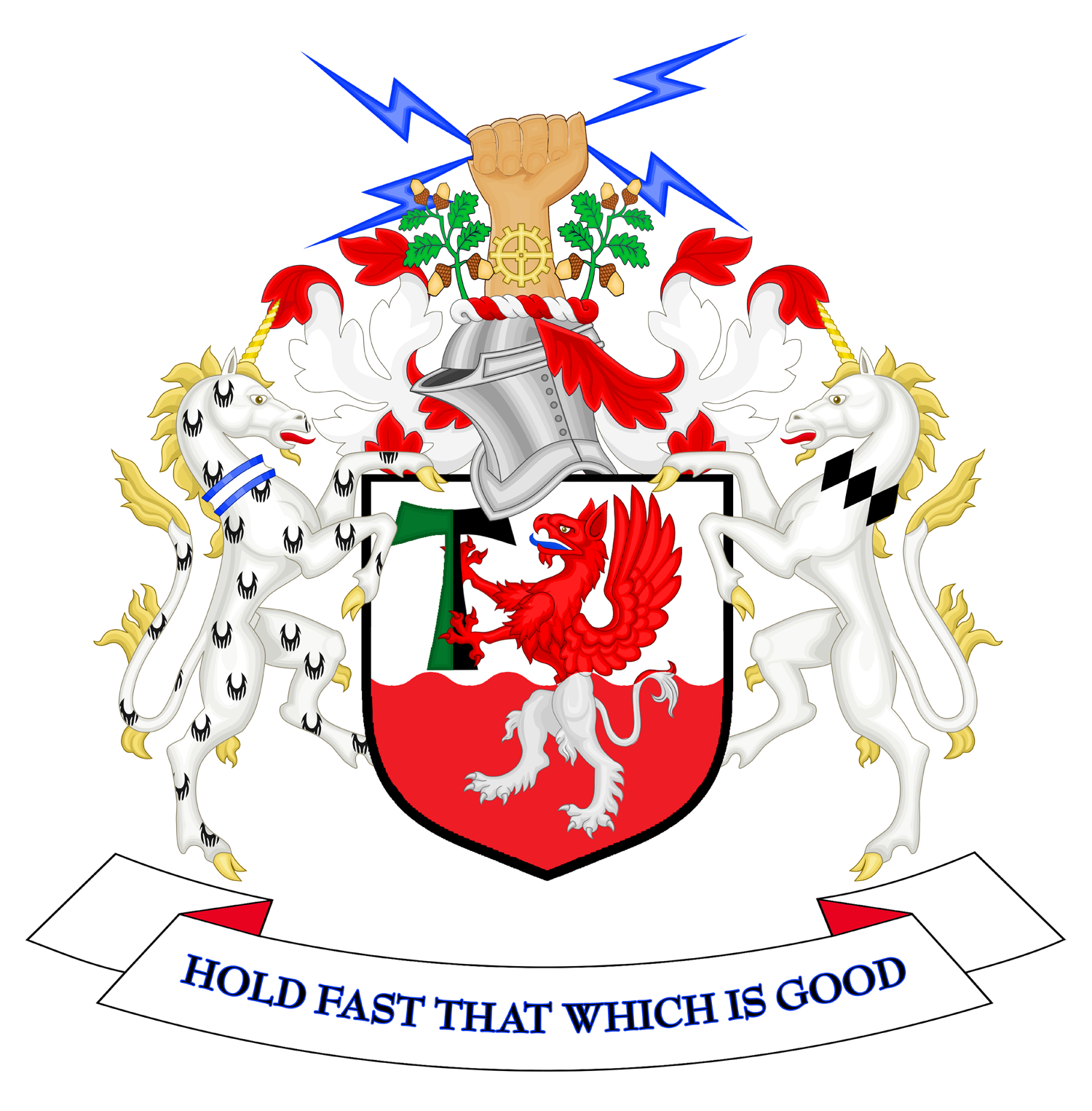
- 7 May 1998

21 of 63 seats to Trafford Metropolitan Borough Council 32 seats needed for a majority
| | First party | Second party | Third party |
|---|---|---|---|
| Leader | David Acton | Frank Eadie | Ray Bowker |
| Party | Labour | Conservative | Liberal Democrats |
| Leader's seat | Urmston | Davyhulme East | Village |
| Last election | 10 seats, 43.9% | 10 seats, 40.8% | 1 seats, 14.5% |
| Seats before | 35 | 22 | 5 |
| Seats won | 12 | 8 | 1 |
| Seats after | 36 | 23 | 4 |
| Seat change | ▲1 | ▲1 | ▼1 |
| Popular vote | 24,844 | 25,185 | 5,114 |
| Percentage | 44.2% | 44.8% | 9.1% |
| Swing | ▲0.3% | ▲4.0% | ▼5.4% |
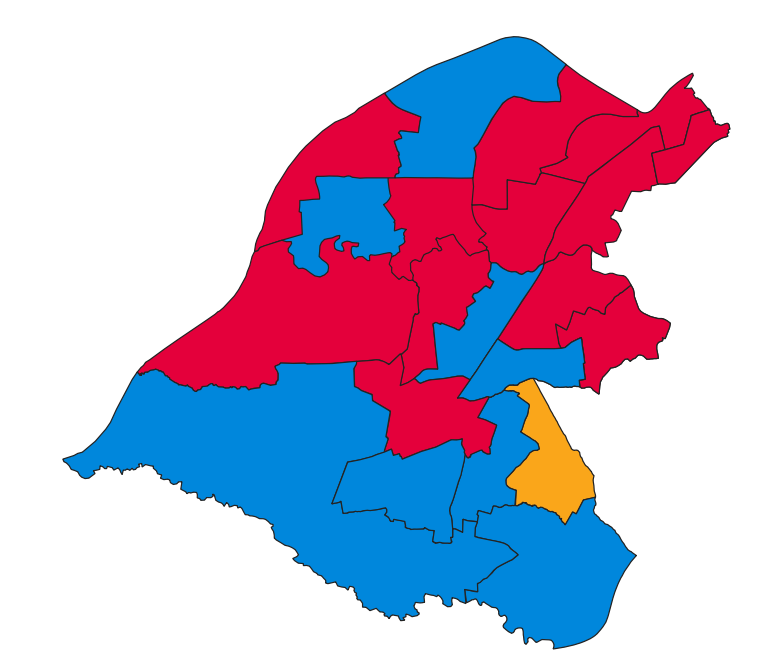
- Map of results of 1998 election
Leader of the Council before election
David Acton
Labour
Leader of the Council after election
David Acton
Labour

Elections to Trafford Council were held on 7 May 1998. One-third of the council was up for election, with each successful candidate to serve a four-year term of office, expiring in 2002. The Labour Party held overall control of the council.

== Election result ==
| Party | Votes | | Seats | | | Full Council | |
| Labour Party | 24,844 (44.2%) | ▲0.3 | 12 (57.1%) | 12 / 21 | ▲6 | 36 (57.1%) | 36 / 63 |
| Conservative Party | 25,185 (44.8%) | ▲4.0 | 8 (38.1%) | 8 / 21 | ▲1 | 23 (36.5%) | 23 / 63 |
| Liberal Democrats | 5,114 (9.1%) | ▼5.4 | 1 (4.8%) | 1 / 21 | ▼1 | 4 (6.3%) | 4 / 63 |
| Independent | 773 (1.4%) | ▲0.5 | 0 (0.0%) | 0 / 21 | ▼1 | 0 (0.0%) | 0 / 63 |
| Socialist Labour Party | 266 (0.5%) | N/A | 0 (0.0%) | 0 / 21 | N/A | 0 (0.0%) | 0 / 63 |

↓
| 36 | 4 | 23 |

== Ward results ==
=== Altrincham ===
Altrincham
| Party | Candidate | Votes | % | ±% |
|---|---|---|---|---|
| Conservative | S. F. M. Fildes | 1,700 | 50.7 | +1.4 |
| Labour | J. C. Graham | 1,501 | 44.8 | −3.6 |
| Independent | P. J. Royle | 77 | 2.3 | +2.3 |
| Independent | A. L. Brookes | 74 | 2.2 | +2.2 |
| Majority | | 199 | 5.9 | −2.3 |
| Turnout | | 3,352 | 37.6 | −0.6 |
| Conservative gain from Independent | | Swing | | |

=== Bowdon ===
Bowdon
| Party | Candidate | Votes | % | ±% |
|---|---|---|---|---|
| Conservative | M. C. Harney* | 2,042 | 66.3 | +5.0 |
| Liberal Democrats | C. Musgrove | 550 | 17.9 | −1.1 |
| Labour | R. G. Monkhouse | 486 | 15.8 | −4.0 |
| Majority | | 1,492 | 48.4 | +6.9 |
| Turnout | | 3,078 | 32.7 | −5.5 |
| Conservative hold | | Swing | | |

=== Broadheath ===
Broadheath
| Party | Candidate | Votes | % | ±% |
|---|---|---|---|---|
| Labour | J. E. Baugh* | 1,704 | 51.3 | +6.9 |
| Conservative | D. C. Simm | 1,383 | 41.6 | −5.6 |
| Liberal Democrats | D. Jones | 238 | 7.2 | −1.2 |
| Majority | | 321 | 9.7 | +6.8 |
| Turnout | | 3,325 | 38.3 | −5.4 |
| Labour hold | | Swing | | |

=== Brooklands ===
Brooklands
| Party | Candidate | Votes | % | ±% |
|---|---|---|---|---|
| Conservative | D. R. Higgins | 1,879 | 61.9 | +12.9 |
| Labour | J. Bagnoli | 833 | 27.5 | −8.3 |
| Liberal Democrats | Y. R. Clarke | 322 | 10.6 | −4.6 |
| Majority | | 1,046 | 34.4 | −21.3 |
| Turnout | | 3,034 | 38.3 | −3.8 |
| Conservative hold | | Swing | | |

=== Bucklow ===
Bucklow
| Party | Candidate | Votes | % | ±% |
|---|---|---|---|---|
| Labour | G. G. Kanes | 1,029 | 86.0 | +3.4 |
| Independent | S. Finch | 80 | 6.7 | +6.7 |
| Independent | M. E. Hindley | 45 | 3.8 | +3.8 |
| Independent | G. Hindley | 42 | 3.5 | +3.5 |
| Majority | | 949 | 79.3 | +20.5 |
| Turnout | | 1,196 | 20.1 | −7.4 |
| Labour hold | | Swing | | |

=== Clifford ===
Clifford
| Party | Candidate | Votes | % | ±% |
|---|---|---|---|---|
| Labour | P. W. Mitchell* | 1,384 | 68.6 | +3.8 |
| Independent | M. Ali | 377 | 18.7 | +1.0 |
| Conservative | L. G. Peck | 256 | 12.7 | −4.8 |
| Majority | | 1,007 | 49.9 | +2.9 |
| Turnout | | 2,017 | 27.5 | −1.7 |
| Labour hold | | Swing | | |

=== Davyhulme East ===
Davyhulme East
| Party | Candidate | Votes | % | ±% |
|---|---|---|---|---|
| Conservative | E. R. Eadie* | 1,688 | 59.1 | +1.5 |
| Labour | M. H. Rasul | 1,170 | 40.9 | −1.5 |
| Majority | | 518 | 18.2 | |
| Turnout | | 2,858 | 39.2 | |
| Conservative hold | | Swing | | |

=== Davyhulme West ===
Davyhulme West
| Party | Candidate | Votes | % | ±% |
|---|---|---|---|---|
| Labour | F. Mottley | 1,449 | 48.6 | −1.2 |
| Conservative | J. R. Reilly | 1,438 | 48.2 | −2.0 |
| Socialist Labour | J. D. Flannery | 95 | 3.2 | +3.2 |
| Majority | | 11 | 0.4 | +0.1 |
| Turnout | | 2,982 | 38.4 | −4.6 |
| Labour gain from Conservative | | Swing | | |

=== Flixton ===
Flixton
| Party | Candidate | Votes | % | ±% |
|---|---|---|---|---|
| Conservative | T. R. Seddon* | 1,754 | 53.4 | +10.9 |
| Labour | M. G. H. Barker | 1,532 | 46.6 | +4.9 |
| Majority | | 222 | 6.8 | +6.0 |
| Turnout | | 3,286 | 42.8 | −3.4 |
| Conservative hold | | Swing | | |

=== Hale ===
Hale
| Party | Candidate | Votes | % | ±% |
|---|---|---|---|---|
| Conservative | M. Lucas* | 2,069 | 70.7 | +11.0 |
| Liberal Democrats | R. M. Elliott | 438 | 15.0 | −12.0 |
| Labour | A. D . McNee | 420 | 14.4 | +1.1 |
| Majority | | 1,631 | 55.7 | +23.1 |
| Turnout | | 2,927 | 34.0 | −8.1 |
| Conservative hold | | Swing | | |

=== Longford ===
Longford
| Party | Candidate | Votes | % | ±% |
|---|---|---|---|---|
| Labour | J. A. Lloyd | 1,576 | 64.3 | +5.2 |
| Conservative | A. Kelly | 875 | 35.7 | −5.2 |
| Majority | | 701 | 28.6 | +10.4 |
| Turnout | | 2,451 | 33.0 | −2.4 |
| Labour hold | | Swing | | |

=== Mersey-St. Mary's ===
Mersey St. Marys
| Party | Candidate | Votes | % | ±% |
|---|---|---|---|---|
| Conservative | B. D. Rigby* | 2,155 | 63.3 | +13.2 |
| Labour | J. Bennett | 952 | 28.0 | −7.1 |
| Liberal Democrats | G. P. Rogers | 297 | 8.7 | −6.1 |
| Majority | | 1,203 | 35.3 | +20.9 |
| Turnout | | 3,404 | 34.7 | −3.6 |
| Conservative hold | | Swing | | |

=== Park ===
Park
| Party | Candidate | Votes | % | ±% |
|---|---|---|---|---|
| Labour | J. R. Haydock* | 956 | 64.3 | −2.5 |
| Conservative | E. J. Kelson | 531 | 35.7 | +2.5 |
| Majority | | 425 | 28.6 | −5.0 |
| Turnout | | 1,487 | 24.4 | −8.0 |
| Labour hold | | Swing | | |

=== Priory ===
Priory
| Party | Candidate | Votes | % | ±% |
|---|---|---|---|---|
| Labour | B. Brotherton* | 1,533 | 53.0 | +9.4 |
| Conservative | C. E. McEwen | 778 | 26.9 | +3.6 |
| Liberal Democrats | A. Vernon | 580 | 20.1 | −13.0 |
| Majority | | 755 | 26.1 | +15.7 |
| Turnout | | 2,891 | 36.9 | −8.9 |
| Labour hold | | Swing | | |

=== Sale Moor ===
Sale Moor
| Party | Candidate | Votes | % | ±% |
|---|---|---|---|---|
| Labour | P. Gratrix* | 1,380 | 54.1 | +5.4 |
| Conservative | R. D. Baldwin | 880 | 34.5 | −3.5 |
| Liberal Democrats | K. Clarke | 256 | 10.0 | −3.3 |
| Socialist Labour | L. M. Wright | 36 | 1.4 | +1.4 |
| Majority | | 500 | 19.6 | +8.9 |
| Turnout | | 2,552 | 33.4 | −6.9 |
| Labour hold | | Swing | | |

=== St. Martin's ===
St. Martins
| Party | Candidate | Votes | % | ±% |
|---|---|---|---|---|
| Labour | L. T. Murkin* | 1,481 | 59.8 | −2.5 |
| Conservative | P. A. Almond | 805 | 32.5 | +2.5 |
| Liberal Democrats | T. J. P. Corbett | 189 | 7.6 | 0 |
| Majority | | 676 | 27.3 | −5.0 |
| Turnout | | 2,475 | 28.8 | −6.4 |
| Labour hold | | Swing | | |

=== Stretford ===
Stretford
| Party | Candidate | Votes | % | ±% |
|---|---|---|---|---|
| Labour | S. A. Adshead* | 1,449 | 59.5 | −2.8 |
| Conservative | K. G. Summerfield | 851 | 35.0 | −2.7 |
| Socialist Labour | P. J. Hibberd | 135 | 5.5 | +5.5 |
| Majority | | 598 | 24.5 | 0 |
| Turnout | | 2,435 | 32.0 | −8.1 |
| Labour hold | | Swing | | |

=== Talbot ===
Talbot
| Party | Candidate | Votes | % | ±% |
|---|---|---|---|---|
| Labour | S. Beaumont* | 944 | 72.3 | −4.0 |
| Conservative | S. M. Dirikis | 361 | 27.7 | +5.5 |
| Majority | | 583 | 44.6 | −9.5 |
| Turnout | | 1,305 | 20.9 | −7.1 |
| Labour hold | | Swing | | |

=== Timperley ===
Timperley
| Party | Candidate | Votes | % | ±% |
|---|---|---|---|---|
| Conservative | A. Bowker | 1,414 | 45.8 | +4.8 |
| Liberal Democrats | D. C. R. Horstead* | 844 | 27.4 | −8.0 |
| Labour | M. E. Atherton | 827 | 26.8 | +3.2 |
| Majority | | 570 | 18.4 | |
| Turnout | | 3,085 | 34.6 | −6.2 |
| Conservative gain from Liberal Democrats | | Swing | | |

=== Urmston ===
Urmston
| Party | Candidate | Votes | % | ±% |
|---|---|---|---|---|
| Labour | D. Acton* | 1,645 | 58.9 | −3.0 |
| Conservative | D. M. H. Nicklin | 1,068 | 38.3 | +0.2 |
| Independent | N. J. Barrett | 78 | 2.8 | |
| Majority | | 577 | 20.6 | −3.2 |
| Turnout | | 2,791 | 37.1 | −6.0 |
| Labour hold | | Swing | | |

=== Village ===
Village
| Party | Candidate | Votes | % | ±% |
|---|---|---|---|---|
| Liberal Democrats | M. D. Cragg | 1,400 | 43.1 | −16.4 |
| Conservative | R. G. Strafford | 1,258 | 38.7 | +14.6 |
| Labour | M. E. Rose | 593 | 18.2 | +1.8 |
| Majority | | 142 | 4.4 | −31.0 |
| Turnout | | 3,251 | 34.4 | −1.0 |
| Liberal Democrats hold | | Swing | | |
