= Davyhulme East =

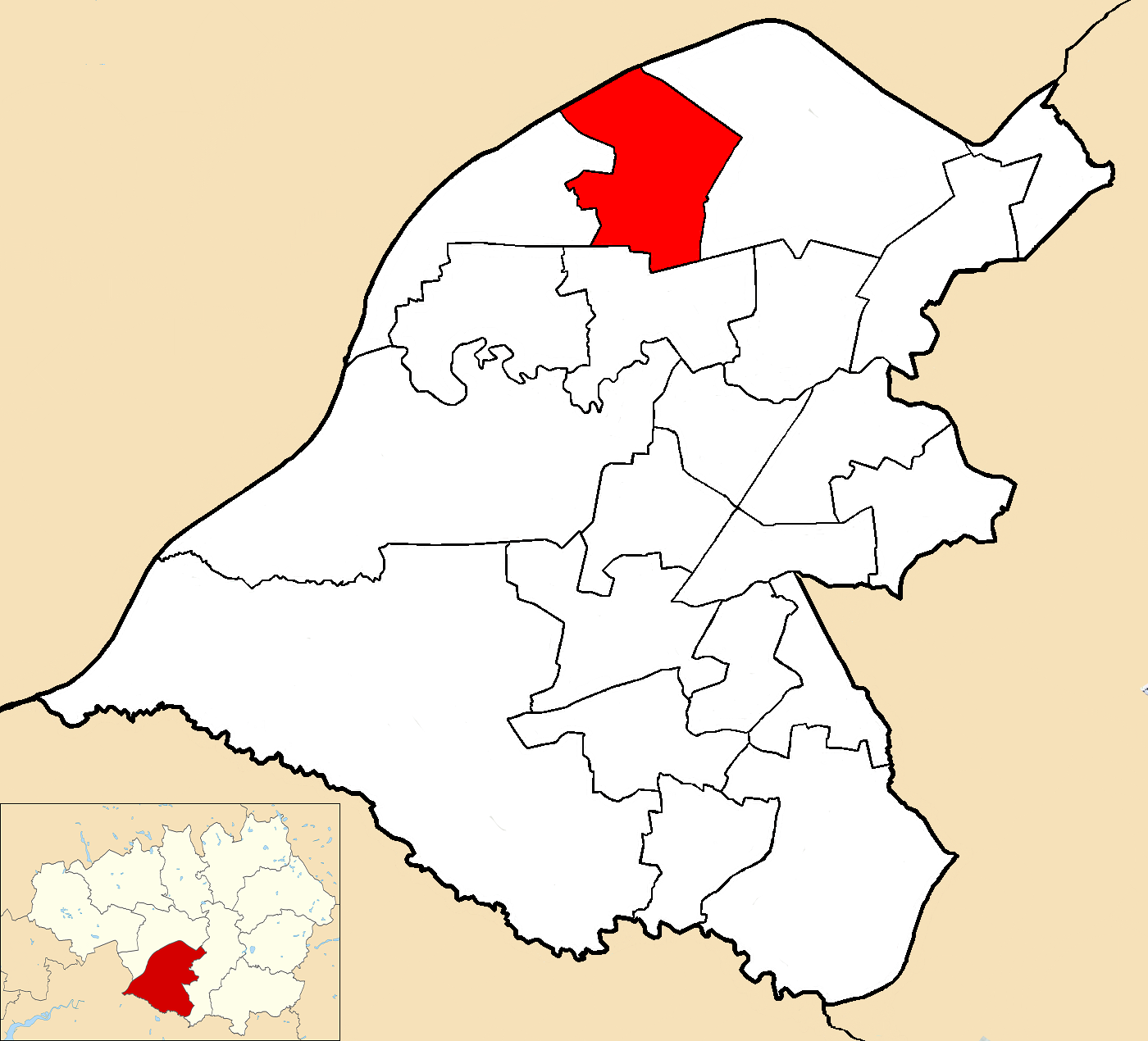
- Davyhulme East within Trafford
- Population: 9,680
- Metropolitan borough: Trafford
- Metropolitan county: Greater Manchester
- Country: England
- Sovereign state: United Kingdom
- UK Parliament: Stretford and Urmston
- Councillors: Shirley Procter (Labour); Barry Winstanley (Labour); Jill Axford (Labour)

Davyhulme East is an electoral ward of Trafford, Greater Manchester, covering Dumplington, the eastern half of Davyhulme and a small part of Urmston.

== Councillors ==
Since 2022, the councillors are Shirley Procter (Labour), Barry Winstanley (Labour), and Jill Axford (Labour).

Election	Councillor	Councillor	Councillor
1973	Ray Haigh (Con)	Frank Eadie (Con)	Eric Crosbie (Con)
1975	Ray Haigh (Con)	Frank Eadie (Con)	Eric Crosbie (Con)
1976	Ray Haigh (Con)	Frank Eadie (Con)	Eric Crosbie (Con)
1978	Ray Haigh (Con)	Frank Eadie (Con)	Eric Crosbie (Con)
1979	Ray Haigh (Con)	Frank Eadie (Con)	Eric Crosbie (Con)
1980	Ray Haigh (Con)	Frank Eadie (Con)	Eric Crosbie (Con)
1982	Ray Haigh (Con)	Frank Eadie (Con)	Eric Crosbie (Con)
1983	Ray Haigh (Con)	Frank Eadie (Con)	Eric Crosbie (Con)
1984	Ray Haigh (Con)	Frank Eadie (Con)	Eric Crosbie (Con)
1986	Ray Haigh (Con)	Frank Eadie (Con)	Eric Crosbie (Con)
1987	Ray Haigh (Con)	Frank Eadie (Con)	Eric Crosbie (Con)
1988	Ray Haigh (Con)	Frank Eadie (Con)	Eric Crosbie (Con)
1990	Ray Haigh (Con)	Frank Eadie (Con)	Eric Crosbie (Con)
1991	Ray Haigh (Con)	Frank Eadie (Con)	Eric Crosbie (Con)
1992	Ray Haigh (Con)	Frank Eadie (Con)	Eric Crosbie (Con)
1994	Edith Eadie (Con)	Frank Eadie (Con)	Eric Crosbie (Con)
1995	Edith Eadie (Con)	Frank Eadie (Con)	Eric Crosbie (Con)
1996	Edith Eadie (Con)	Frank Eadie (Con)	Eric Crosbie (Con)
1998	Edith Eadie (Con)	Frank Eadie (Con)	Eric Crosbie (Con)
1999	Edith Eadie (Con)	Frank Eadie (Con)	Eric Crosbie (Con)
2000	Edith Eadie (Con)	Frank Eadie (Con)	Eric Crosbie (Con)
May 2002	Edith Eadie (Con)	Frank Eadie (Con)	Eric Crosbie (Con)
Nov 2002	Edith Eadie (Con)	Mike Cornes (Con)	Eric Crosbie (Con)
2003	Edith Eadie (Con)	Mike Cornes (Con)	Eric Crosbie (Con)
2004	Edith Eadie (Con)	Gary Brockbanks (Con)	Mike Cornes (Con)
2006	Edith Eadie (Con)	Gary Brockbanks (Con)	Mike Cornes (Con)
2007	Edith Eadie (Con)	Gary Brockbanks (Con)	Mike Cornes (Con)
2008	Linda Blackburn (Con)	Gary Brockbanks (Con)	Mike Cornes (Con)
2010	Linda Blackburn (Con)	Gary Brockbanks (Con)	Mike Cornes (Con)
2011	Linda Blackburn (Con)	Lisa Cooke (Con)	Mike Cornes (Con)
2012	Linda Blackburn (Con)	Lisa Cooke (Con)	Mike Cornes (Con)
2014	Linda Blackburn (Con)	Lisa Cooke (Con)	Mike Cornes (Con)
2015	Linda Blackburn (Con)	Mark Cawdrey (Con)	Mike Cornes (Con)
2016	Linda Blackburn (Con)	Mark Cawdrey (Con)	Mike Cornes (Con)
2018	Linda Blackburn (Con)	Mark Cawdrey (Con)	Jayne Dillon (Lab)
2019	Linda Blackburn (Con)	Barry Winstanley (Lab)	Jayne Dillon (Lab)
2021	Jill Axford (Lab)	Barry Winstanley (Lab)	Jayne Dillon (Lab)
2022	Jill Axford (Lab)	Barry Winstanley (Lab)	Shirley Procter (Lab)

indicates seat up for re-election.

== Elections in the 2020s ==
=== May 2022 ===
2022
Party	Candidate	Votes	%	±%
Labour	Shirley Procter	1,732	54.1	
Conservative	Steve Dillon	1,134	35.4	
Green	Steve Tennant	180	5.6	
Liberal Democrats	Timothy Kinsella	138	4.3	
Majority		598	18.7	
Registered electors		7,603		
Turnout		3,199	42.1	
Labour hold		Swing		

=== May 2021 ===
2021
Party	Candidate	Votes	%	±%
Labour	Jill Axford	1,882	51.4	▲13.7
Conservative	Steve Dillon	1,467	40.1	▼4.9
Green	Steve Tennant	172	4.7	▲0.6
Liberal Democrats	James Marshall	107	2.9	▲0.4
Majority		415	11.3	N/A
Rejected ballots		31		
Registered electors		7,703		
Turnout		3,659	47.5	▲5.6
Labour gain from Conservative		Swing	▲9.3	

== Elections in the 2010s ==
=== May 2019 ===
2019
Party	Candidate	Votes	%	±%
Labour	Barry Winstanley	1,929	60.9	▲3.4
Conservative	Daniel Kupusarevic	695	21.9	▼14.3
UKIP	Gary Regan	253	7.9	▲6.1
Green	Steven Tennant-Smythe	184	5.8	▲3.2
Liberal Democrats	Dawn Carberry-Power	102	3.2	▲1.3
Majority		1,234	39.0	▲17.7
Registered electors		7,700		
Turnout		3,163	41.26	▼8.2
Labour gain from Conservative		Swing		

=== May 2018 ===
2018
Party	Candidate	Votes	%	±%
Labour	Jayne Dillon	2,205	57.5	+19.7
Conservative	Mike Cornes*	1,388	36.2	−9.0
Green	Steven Tennant-Smythe	100	2.6	−1.5
Liberal Democrats	Sue Sutherland	73	1.9	−0.6
UKIP	Gary Regan	69	1.8	−8.6
Majority		817	21.3	
Turnout		3,835	49.5	+7.6
Labour gain from Conservative		Swing		

=== May 2016 ===
2016
Party	Candidate	Votes	%	±%
Conservative	Linda Blackburn*	1,401	45.0	+2.7
Labour	Jayne Dillon	1,172	37.7	−3.6
UKIP	Ian Royle	321	10.3	−0.7
Green	Steven Tennant-Smythe	128	4.1	−0.8
Liberal Democrats	David Kierman	79	2.5	+2.5
Majority		229	7.4	−6.3
Turnout		3,112	41.9	−28.5
Conservative hold		Swing	+3.15	

=== May 2015 ===
2015
Party	Candidate	Votes	%	±%
Conservative	Mark Cawdrey	2,218	42.5	+0.3
Labour	Anna Booth	2,160	41.4	+8.7
UKIP	Stephen Farndon	581	11.1	−6.0
Green	Steven Tennant-Smythe	254	4.8	+0.3
Majority		58	1.1	−8.4
Turnout		5,213	70.4	+33.7
Conservative hold		Swing	-4.2	

=== May 2014 ===
2014
Party	Candidate	Votes	%	±%
Conservative	Mike Cornes*	1,256	42.2	−7.1
Labour	Anna Booth	973	32.7	−10.4
UKIP	Paul Pickford	509	17.1	+17.1
Green	Jennie Wadsworth	134	4.5	−0.7
Liberal Democrats	Graham Rogers	63	2.1	−0.4
Socialist Labour	Jim Flannery	41	1.4	+1.4
Majority		283	9.5	+4.4
Turnout		2,976	36.7	−3.9
Conservative hold		Swing	+1.65	

=== May 2012 ===
2012
Party	Candidate	Votes	%	±%
Conservative	Linda Blackburn*	1,480	49.3	−1.7
Labour	Helen Simpson	1,295	43.1	+1.1
Green	Jennie Wadsworth	155	5.2	+1.3
Liberal Democrats	Kenneth Clarke	75	2.5	−0.5
Majority		185	6.2	−2.8
Turnout		3,005	40.6	−4.1
Conservative hold		Swing	-1.4	

=== May 2011 ===
2011
Party	Candidate	Votes	%	±%
Conservative	Lisa Cooke	1,759	51.0	+7.7
Labour	Helen Simpson	1,448	42.0	+3.8
Green	Jennie Wadsworth	134	3.9	+0.9
Liberal Democrats	Louise Bird	105	3.0	−12.5
Majority		311	9.0	+3.9
Turnout		3,446	44.7	−21.8
Conservative hold		Swing	+1.95	

=== May 2010 ===
2010
Party	Candidate	Votes	%	±%
Conservative	Mike Cornes*	2,232	43.3	−17.0
Labour	Helen Simpson	1,969	38.2	+13.7
Liberal Democrats	Pauline Cliff	801	15.5	+5.5
Green	Jennie Wadsworth	157	3.0	−2.2
Majority		263	5.1	−30.7
Turnout		5,159	66.5	+30.3
Conservative hold		Swing	-15.35	

== Elections in the 2000s ==
=== May 2008 ===
2008
Party	Candidate	Votes	%	±%
Conservative	Linda Blackburn	1,728	60.3	+1.9
Labour	Ged Carter	703	24.5	−6.9
Liberal Democrats	Graham Rogers	286	10.0	+10.0
Green	Jennie Gander	150	5.2	−1.8
Majority		1,025	35.8	+8.8
Turnout		2,867	36.2	−2.0
Conservative hold		Swing	+5.35	

=== May 2007 ===
2007
Party	Candidate	Votes	%	±%
Conservative	Gary Brockbanks*	1,679	58.4	−4.7
Labour	Nigel Roberts	902	31.4	−5.5
Green	Jennie Gander	202	7.0	+7.0
Socialist Labour	James Flannery	92	3.2	+3.2
Majority		777	27.0	+0.8
Turnout		2,875	38.2	+1.7
Conservative hold		Swing	+0.4	

=== May 2006 ===
2006
Party	Candidate	Votes	%	±%
Conservative	Michael Cornes*	1,726	63.1	−2.5
Labour	Nigel Roberts	1,008	36.9	+9.7
Majority		718	26.2	−6.2
Turnout		2,734	36.5	−9.1
Conservative hold		Swing	-12.2	

=== May 2004 ===
2004 (after boundary changes)
Party	Candidate	Votes	%	±%
Conservative	Edith Eadie*	2,007	22.1	
Conservative	Gary Brockbanks	1,979	21.8	
Conservative	Michael Cornes*	1,968	21.7	
Labour	Shirley Procter	987	10.9	
Labour	Jeanette McLaughlin	785	8.6	
Labour	Arikoti Chikoti	698	7.7	
Liberal Democrats	Graham Rogers	518	5.7	
Socialist Labour	James Flannery	135	1.5	
Turnout		9,077	45.6	
Conservative win (new seat)				
Conservative win (new seat)				
Conservative win (new seat)				

=== May 2003 ===
2003
Party	Candidate	Votes	%	±%
Conservative	Eric Crosbie*	2,331	62.1	+4.7
Labour	Nigel Roberts	1,425	37.9	−4.8
Majority		906	24.2	+9.5
Turnout		3,756	53.8	+1.6
Conservative hold		Swing		

=== November 2002 (by-election) ===
By-Election 28 November 2002
Party	Candidate	Votes	%	±%
Conservative	M. D. Cornes	2,030	57.6	+0.2
Labour	N. K. Roberts	1,493	42.4	−0.2
Majority		537	15.2	+0.5
Turnout		3,523	50.0	−2.2
Conservative hold		Swing		

=== May 2002 ===
2002
Party	Candidate	Votes	%	±%
Conservative	Edith Eadie*	2,126	57.4	−9.7
Labour	Nigel Roberts	1,581	42.7	+9.7
Majority		545	14.7	−19.4
Turnout		3,707	52.2	+19.7
Conservative hold		Swing		

=== May 2000 ===
2000
Party	Candidate	Votes	%	±%
Conservative	Frank Eadie*	1,587	67.1	+6.4
Labour	Jeanette McLaughlin	780	33.0	−2.0
Majority		807	34.1	+8.4
Turnout		2,367	32.5	+0.1
Conservative hold		Swing		

== Elections in the 1990s ==
1999
Party	Candidate	Votes	%	±%
Conservative	Crosbie*	1,428	60.7	+1.6
Labour	Walsh	824	35.0	−5.9
Liberal Democrats	Nolte	100	4.3	+4.3
Majority		604	25.7	+7.5
Turnout		2,352	32.4	−6.8
Conservative hold		Swing		

1998
Party	Candidate	Votes	%	±%
Conservative	E. R. Eadie*	1,688	59.1	+1.5
Labour	M. H. Rasul	1,170	40.9	−1.5
Majority		518	18.2	
Turnout		2,858	39.2	
Conservative hold		Swing		

1996
Party	Candidate	Votes	%	±%
Conservative	F. H. Eadie*	1,643	57.6	+2.0
Labour	S. Hesford	1,211	42.4	−2.0
Majority		432	15.1	+3.8
Turnout		2,854	41.8	−2.9
Conservative hold		Swing		

1995
Party	Candidate	Votes	%	±%
Conservative	R. E. Crosbie*	1,840	55.6	+3.1
Labour	S. Hesford	1,467	44.4	+5.4
Majority		373	11.3	−2.3
Turnout		3,307	44.7	−3.8
Conservative hold		Swing		

1994
Party	Candidate	Votes	%	±%
Conservative	E. R. Eadie	1,888	52.5	−14.2
Labour	S. Hesford	1,401	39.0	+11.9
Liberal Democrats	F. A. Cameron	305	8.5	+2.3
Majority		487	13.6	−26.1
Turnout		3,594	48.5	+7.9
Conservative hold		Swing		

1992
Party	Candidate	Votes	%	±%
Conservative	F. H. Eadie*	2,023	66.7	+14.5
Labour	A. P. Roberts	821	27.1	−8.3
Liberal Democrats	A. J. Storey	187	6.2	−1.2
Majority		1,202	39.7	+22.9
Turnout		3,031	40.6	−7.5
Conservative hold		Swing		

1991
Party	Candidate	Votes	%	±%
Conservative	R. E. Crosbie*	1,907	52.2	−0.1
Labour	G. Smethurst	1,292	35.4	−6.2
Liberal Democrats	F. A. Cameron	271	7.4	+7.4
Independent	J. W. Rowton	181	5.0	+5.0
Majority		615	16.8	+6.1
Turnout		3,651	48.1	−5.1
Conservative hold		Swing		

1990
Party	Candidate	Votes	%	±%
Conservative	R. G. Haigh*	2,138	52.3	−9.2
Labour	G. Smethurst	1,702	41.6	+11.8
Green	A. E. Peplow	248	6.1	+6.1
Majority		436	10.7	−21.0
Turnout		4,088	53.2	+9.1
Conservative hold		Swing		

== Elections in the 1980s ==
1988
Party	Candidate	Votes	%	±%
Conservative	F. H. Eadie*	2,108	61.5	+4.9
Labour	F. Mottley	1,022	29.8	+1.4
Liberal Democrats	C. R. Hedley	296	8.6	−6.4
Majority		1,086	31.7	+3.5
Turnout		3,426	44.1	−10.2
Conservative hold		Swing		

1987
Party	Candidate	Votes	%	±%
Conservative	R. E. Crosbie*	2,396	56.6	+6.4
Labour	N. J. Bentham	1,203	28.4	−8.2
Liberal	D. E. Unwin	635	15.0	+15.0
Majority		1,193	28.2	+14.6
Turnout		4,234	54.3	+7.7
Conservative hold		Swing		

1986
Party	Candidate	Votes	%	±%
Conservative	R. G. Haigh*	1,812	50.2	+4.5
Labour	J. B. Roberts	1,320	36.6	+1.8
SDP	R. J. Thompson	474	13.1	+13.1
Majority		492	13.6	+2.7
Turnout		3,606	46.6	+2.9
Conservative hold		Swing		

1984
Party	Candidate	Votes	%	±%
Conservative	F. H. Eadie*	1,547	45.7	+1.0
Labour	J. B. Roberts	1,177	34.8	+0.9
Liberal	A. D. Sanders	660	19.5	−1.9
Majority		370	10.9	+0.2
Turnout		3,384	43.7	−10.6
Conservative hold		Swing		

1983
Party	Candidate	Votes	%	±%
Conservative	R. E. Crosbie*	1,852	44.7	−1.2
Labour	S. Rogers	1,407	33.9	+3.7
Alliance	A. Vernon	888	21.4	−2.5
Majority		445	10.7	−4.9
Turnout		4,147	54.3	+3.2
Conservative hold		Swing		

1982
Party	Candidate	Votes	%	±%
Conservative	R. G. Haigh*	1,806	45.9	+2.3
Labour	S. Rogers	1,191	30.2	−10.4
Liberal	J. A. Cottrell	941	23.9	+8.1
Majority		615	15.6	+12.6
Turnout		3,938	51.1	+8.7
Conservative hold		Swing		

1980
Party	Candidate	Votes	%	±%
Conservative	F. H. Eadie*	1,408	43.6	−7.1
Labour	L. M. Seex	1,311	40.6	+7.9
Liberal	T. M. Owen	512	15.8	−0.9
Majority		97	3.0	−15.0
Turnout		3,231	42.4	−37.2
Conservative hold		Swing		

== Elections in the 1970s ==
1979
Party	Candidate	Votes	%	±%
Conservative	R. E. Crosbie*	2,194	50.7	−11.1
Labour	G. R. Scott	1,415	32.7	+11.9
Liberal	T. M. Owen	722	16.7	−0.7
Majority		779	18.0	−22.9
Turnout		4,331	79.6	+42.9
Conservative hold		Swing		

1978
Party	Candidate	Votes	%	±%
Conservative	R. G. Haigh*	1,221	61.8	+1.9
Labour	R. P. F. Phillips	412	20.8	−9.6
Liberal	T. M. Owen	344	17.4	+7.7
Majority		809	40.9	+11.4
Turnout		1,977	36.7	−4.7
Conservative hold		Swing		

1976
Party	Candidate	Votes	%	±%
Conservative	F. H. Eadie*	1,348	59.9	+9.8
Labour	M. F. Treadaway	685	30.4	+5.2
Liberal	W. A. Munden	218	9.7	−15.0
Majority		663	29.5	+4.6
Turnout		2,251	41.4	−0.2
Conservative hold		Swing		

1975
Party	Candidate	Votes	%	±%
Conservative	R. E. Crosbie*	1,125	50.1	
Labour	W. J. Williams	566	25.2	
Liberal	T. M. Owen	554	24.7	
Majority		559	24.9	
Turnout		2,245	41.6	
Conservative hold		Swing		

1973
Party	Candidate	Votes	%	±%
Conservative	R. G. Haigh	1,158	63.1	
Conservative	F. H. Eadie	1,148		
Conservative	R. E. Crosbie	1,122		
Labour	B. Hall	678	36.9	
Labour	D. Stewart	658		
Labour	G. Scott	629		
Majority		444		
Turnout		1,836	33.2	
Conservative win (new seat)				
Conservative win (new seat)				
Conservative win (new seat)				
