= 1999 Trafford Metropolitan Borough Council election =

1999 UK local government election

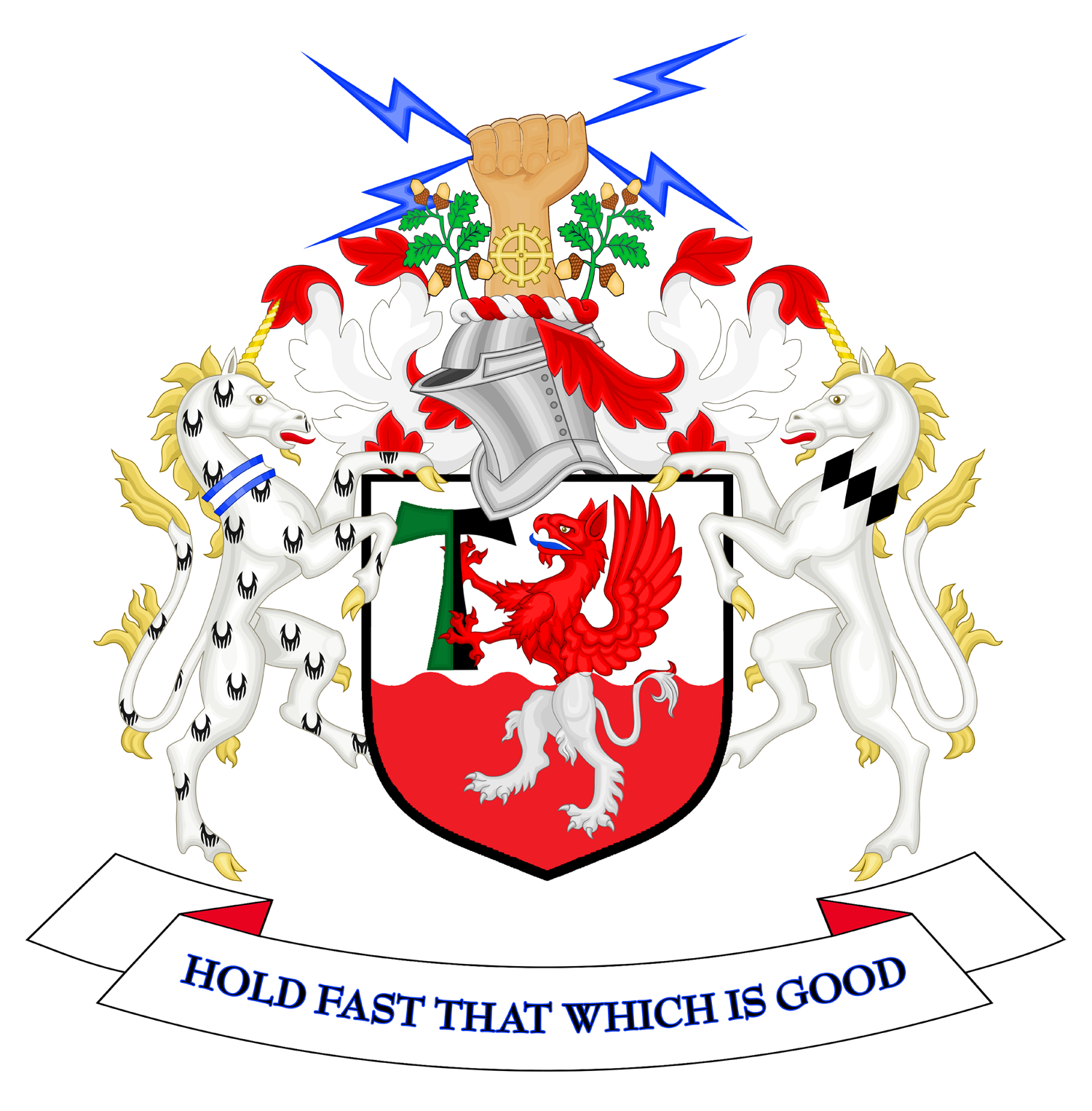
- 6 May 1999

21 of 63 seats to Trafford Metropolitan Borough Council 32 seats needed for a majority
	First party	Second party	Third party
Leader	David Acton	Frank Eadie	Ray Bowker
Party	Labour	Conservative	Liberal Democrats
Leader's seat	Urmston	Davyhulme East	Village
Last election	12 seats, 44.2%	8 seats, 44.8%	1 seats, 9.1%
Seats before	36	23	4
Seats won	11	9	1
Seats after	33	27	3
Seat change	▼3	▲4	▼1
Popular vote	22,844	25,018	6,180
Percentage	41.5%	45.5%	12.4%
Swing	▼2.7%	▲0.7%	▲3.3%
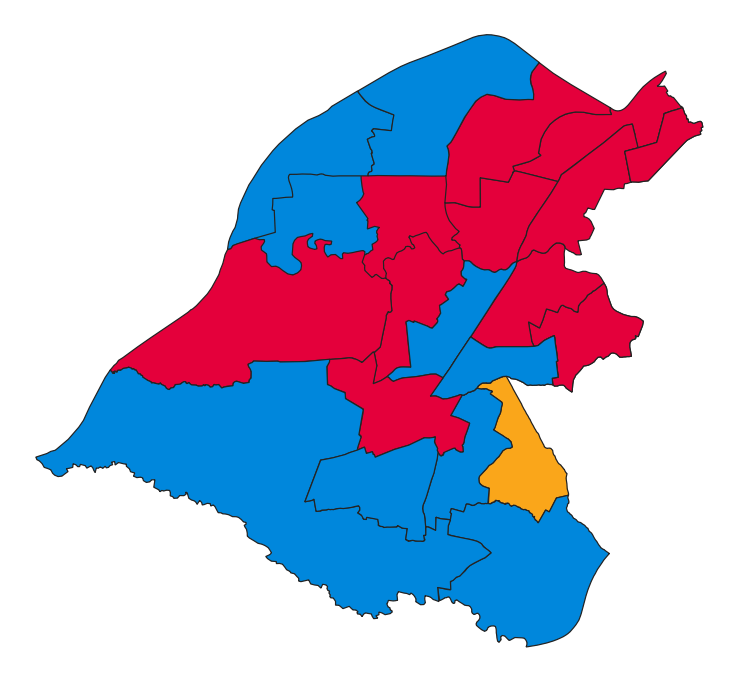
- Map of results of 1999 election
Leader of the Council before election
David Acton
Labour
Leader of the Council after election
David Acton
Labour

On 6 May 1999, an election was held to choose council members for the Trafford Borough Council in Greater Manchester, England. One-third of the council members were up for election, with each successful candidate to serve a four-year term of office, expiring in 2003. The Labour Party held overall control of the council.

== Election results ==
Party	Votes		Seats			Full Council	
Labour Party	22,844 (41.5%)	▼2.7	11 (52.4%)	11 / 21	▼3	33 (52.4%)	33 / 63
Conservative Party	25,018 (45.5%)	▲0.7	9 (42.9%)	9 / 21	▲4	27 (42.9%)	27 / 63
Liberal Democrats	6,180 (12.4%)	▲3.3	1 (4.8%)	1 / 21	▼1	3 (4.8%)	3 / 63
Socialist Labour Party	362 (0.7%)	▲0.2	0 (0.0%)	0 / 21	Steady	0 (0.0%)	0 / 63

↓
33	3	27

== Ward results ==
=== Altrincham ===
Altrincham
Party	Candidate	Votes	%	±%
Conservative	Lynch	1,684	49.9	−0.8
Labour	Graham	1,455	43.1	−1.7
Liberal Democrats	DM Jones	237	7.0	+7.0
Majority		229	6.8	+0.9
Turnout		3,376	38.3	+0.7
Conservative gain from Labour		Swing		

=== Bowdon ===
Bowdon
Party	Candidate	Votes	%	±%
Conservative	Poole*	2,145	69.5	+3.2
Labour	Monkhouse	527	17.1	+1.3
Liberal Democrats	Musgrove	416	13.5	−4.4
Majority		1,618	52.4	+4.0
Turnout		3,088	32.9	+0.2
Conservative hold		Swing		

=== Broadheath ===
Broadheath
Party	Candidate	Votes	%	±%
Labour	Chapman-Barker*	1,575	48.7	−2.6
Conservative	Cohen	1,409	43.5	+1.9
Liberal Democrats	Brookes	252	7.8	+0.6
Majority		166	5.2	−4.5
Turnout		3,236	37.1	−1.2
Labour hold		Swing		

=== Brooklands ===
Brooklands
Party	Candidate	Votes	%	±%
Conservative	Dixon*	1,779	61.1	−0.8
Labour	Bennett	780	26.8	−0.7
Liberal Democrats	YR Clarke	353	12.1	+1.5
Majority		999	34.3	−0.1
Turnout		2,912	36.8	−1.5
Conservative hold		Swing		

=== Bucklow ===
Bucklow
Party	Candidate	Votes	%	±%
Labour	Platt	943	80.7	−5.3
Conservative	Kelly	164	14.0	+14.0
Liberal Democrats	Frankland	61	5.2	+5.2
Majority		779	66.7	−12.6
Turnout		1,168	19.8	−0.3
Labour hold		Swing		

=== Clifford ===
Clifford
Party	Candidate	Votes	%	±%
Labour	Stennett*	1,225	64.5	−4.1
Socialist Labour	Ali	362	19.1	+19.1
Conservative	Wood	240	12.6	−0.1
Liberal Democrats	Hunter	72	3.8	+3.8
Majority		863	45.4	−4.5
Turnout		1,899	25.6	−1.9
Labour hold		Swing		

=== Davyhulme East ===
Davyhulme East
Party	Candidate	Votes	%	±%
Conservative	Crosbie*	1,428	60.7	+1.6
Labour	Walsh	824	35.0	−5.9
Liberal Democrats	Nolte	100	4.3	+4.3
Majority		604	25.7	+7.5
Turnout		2,352	32.4	−6.8
Conservative hold		Swing		

=== Davyhulme West ===
Davyhulme West
Party	Candidate	Votes	%	±%
Conservative	Reilly	1,536	48.3	+0.1
Labour	Gray	1,523	47.9	−0.7
Liberal Democrats	ME Clarke	120	3.8	+3.8
Majority		13	0.4	
Turnout		3,179	41.5	+3.1
Conservative gain from Labour		Swing		

=== Flixton ===
Flixton
Party	Candidate	Votes	%	±%
Conservative	Coupe	1,603	49.2	−4.2
Labour	AS Jones*	1,473	45.2	−1.4
Liberal Democrats	Smith	181	5.6	+5.6
Majority		130	4.0	−2.8
Turnout		3,257	42.4	−0.4
Conservative gain from Labour		Swing		

=== Hale ===
Hale
Party	Candidate	Votes	%	±%
Conservative	Strafford	1,998	66.8	−3.9
Liberal Democrats	Horstead	597	20.0	+5.0
Labour	McNee	395	13.2	−1.2
Majority		1,401	46.8	−8.9
Turnout		2,990	35.3	+1.3
Conservative hold		Swing		

=== Longford ===
Longford
Party	Candidate	Votes	%	±%
Labour	Jarman*	1,215	53.7	−10.6
Conservative	Kelson	910	40.2	+4.5
Liberal Democrats	Browne	137	6.1	+6.1
Majority		305	13.5	−15.1
Turnout		2,262	30.7	−2.3
Labour hold		Swing		

=== Mersey-St. Mary's ===
Mersey St. Marys
Party	Candidate	Votes	%	±%
Conservative	Sharp*	1,935	58.7	−4.6
Labour	Conquest	1,056	32.1	+4.1
Liberal Democrats	Legge	304	9.2	+0.5
Majority		879	26.5	−8.8
Turnout		3,295	33.7	−1.0
Conservative hold		Swing		

=== Park ===
Park
Party	Candidate	Votes	%	±%
Labour	Tully*	858	59.4	−4.9
Conservative	Nakvi	487	33.7	−2.0
Liberal Democrats	JAD Ackroyd	99	6.9	+6.9
Majority		371	25.7	−2.9
Turnout		1,444	23.8	−0.6
Labour hold		Swing		

=== Priory ===
Priory
Party	Candidate	Votes	%	±%
Labour	Keeley-Huggett*	1,373	48.2	−4.8
Conservative	Nightingale	1,009	35.4	+8.5
Liberal Democrats	Vernon	468	16.4	−3.7
Majority		364	12.8	−13.3
Turnout		2,850	36.6	−0.3
Labour hold		Swing		

=== Sale Moor ===
Sale Moor
Party	Candidate	Votes	%	±%
Labour	Rasul	1,177	49.1	−5.0
Conservative	RD Baldwin	897	37.5	+3.0
Liberal Democrats	K Clarke	321	13.4	+3.4
Majority		280	11.6	−8.0
Turnout		2,395	31.5	−1.9
Labour hold		Swing		

=== St. Martin's ===
St. Martins
Party	Candidate	Votes	%	±%
Labour	Quayle*	1,208	54.6	−5.2
Conservative	Myers	803	36.3	+3.8
Liberal Democrats	Dunn	200	9.1	+1.5
Majority		405	18.3	−9.0
Turnout		2,211	26.1	−2.7
Labour hold		Swing		

=== Stretford ===
Stretford
Party	Candidate	Votes	%	±%
Labour	Garlick*	1,475	57.5	−2.0
Conservative	Schofield	973	37.9	+2.9
Liberal Democrats	Rogers	118	4.6	+4.6
Majority		502	19.6	−4.9
Turnout		2,566	33.9	+1.9
Labour hold		Swing		

=== Talbot ===
Talbot
Party	Candidate	Votes	%	±%
Labour	Lane*	1,038	76.3	+4.0
Conservative	Levenston	245	18.0	−9.7
Liberal Democrats	Shacklock	77	5.7	+5.7
Majority		793	58.3	+13.7
Turnout		1,360	21.8	+0.9
Labour hold		Swing		

=== Timperley ===
Timperley
Party	Candidate	Votes	%	±%
Conservative	Akins	1,431	46.2	+0.4
Liberal Democrats	Bruer-Morris*	915	29.5	+2.1
Labour	Atherton	755	24.4	−2.4
Majority		516	16.7	−1.7
Turnout		3,101	35.2	+0.6
Conservative gain from Liberal Democrats		Swing		

=== Urmston ===
Urmston
Party	Candidate	Votes	%	±%
Labour	J Acton*	1,420	51.7	−7.2
Conservative	Nicklin	1,184	43.1	+4.8
Liberal Democrats	Elliot	142	5.2	+5.2
Majority		236	8.6	−12.0
Turnout		2,746	36.7	−0.4
Labour hold		Swing		

=== Village ===
Village
Party	Candidate	Votes	%	±%
Liberal Democrats	BV Ackroyd*	1,640	49.0	+5.9
Conservative	Scholar	1,158	34.6	−4.1
Labour	Harrison	549	16.4	−1.8
Majority		482	14.4	+10.0
Turnout		3,347	35.6	+1.2
Liberal Democrats hold		Swing		
