= Gorse Hill =

Coordinates: 53.4525°N 2.2948°W

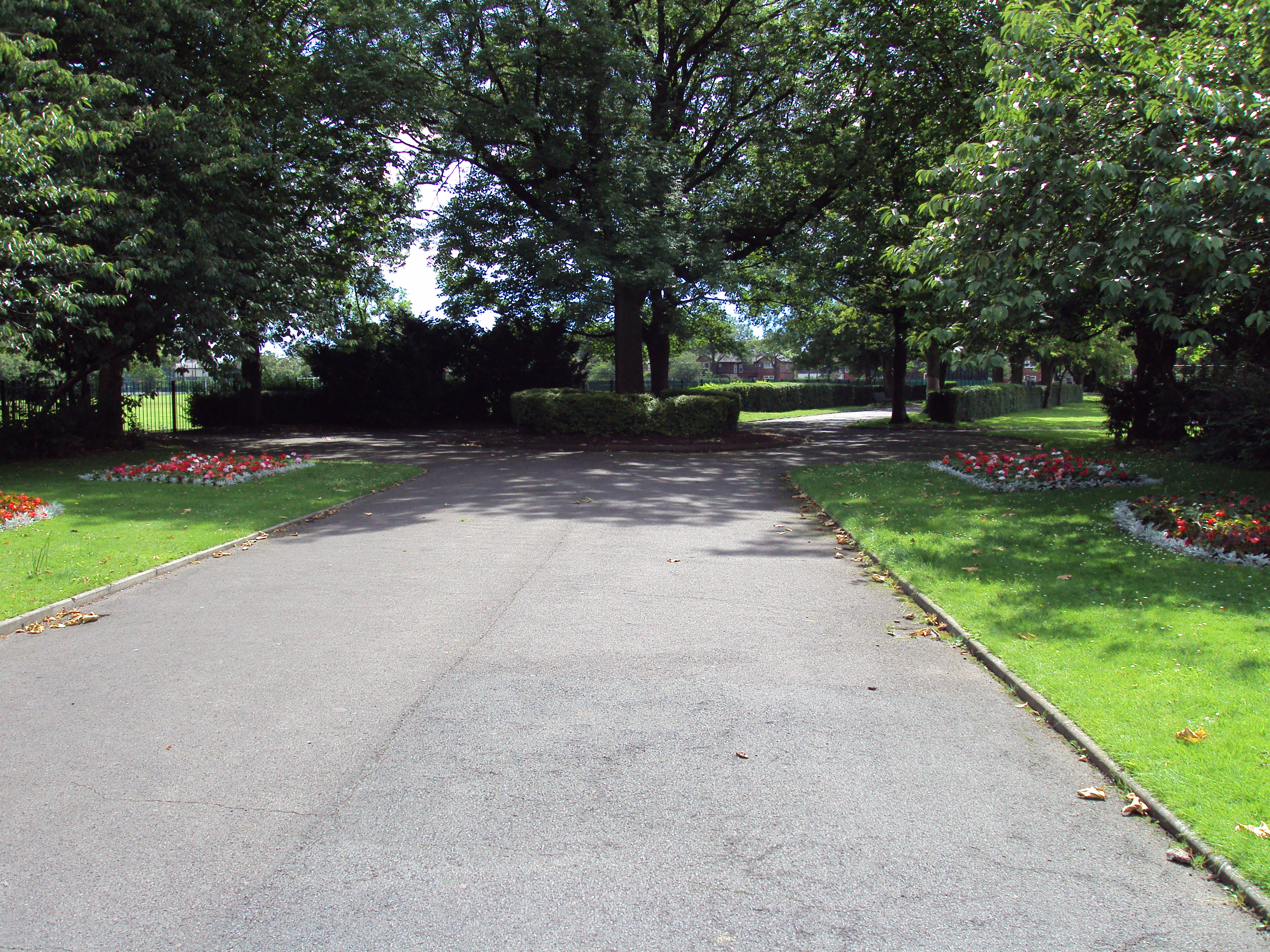
- Road in Gorse Hill Park

- Location within Greater Manchester
- Population: 11,894 (2011)
- OS grid reference: SJ804951
- Metropolitan borough: Trafford
- Metropolitan county: Greater Manchester
- Region: North West
- Country: England
- Sovereign state: United Kingdom
- Post town: MANCHESTER
- Postcode district: M32
- Dialling code: 0161
- Police: Greater Manchester
- Fire: Greater Manchester
- Ambulance: North West
- UK Parliament: Stretford and Urmston

Gorse Hill is an area of Stretford, Greater Manchester, England. The population at the 2011 census was 11,894. It is a residential area with two minor industrial estates on either side of the main A56 Chester Road, which divides the two halves of the ward. Gorse Hill Park is a park which has recently had its historic main gates renovated and sits in between the two halves of the ward also, bridging Chester Road and Talbot Road. Gorse Hill is also the northernmost ward of Trafford council and is home to Trafford Town Hall, housing the council offices. Gorse Hill shares a border with the Clifford and Longford wards, and is home to two teams; both Manchester United F.C. and Lancashire County Cricket Club.
