= Davyhulme West =

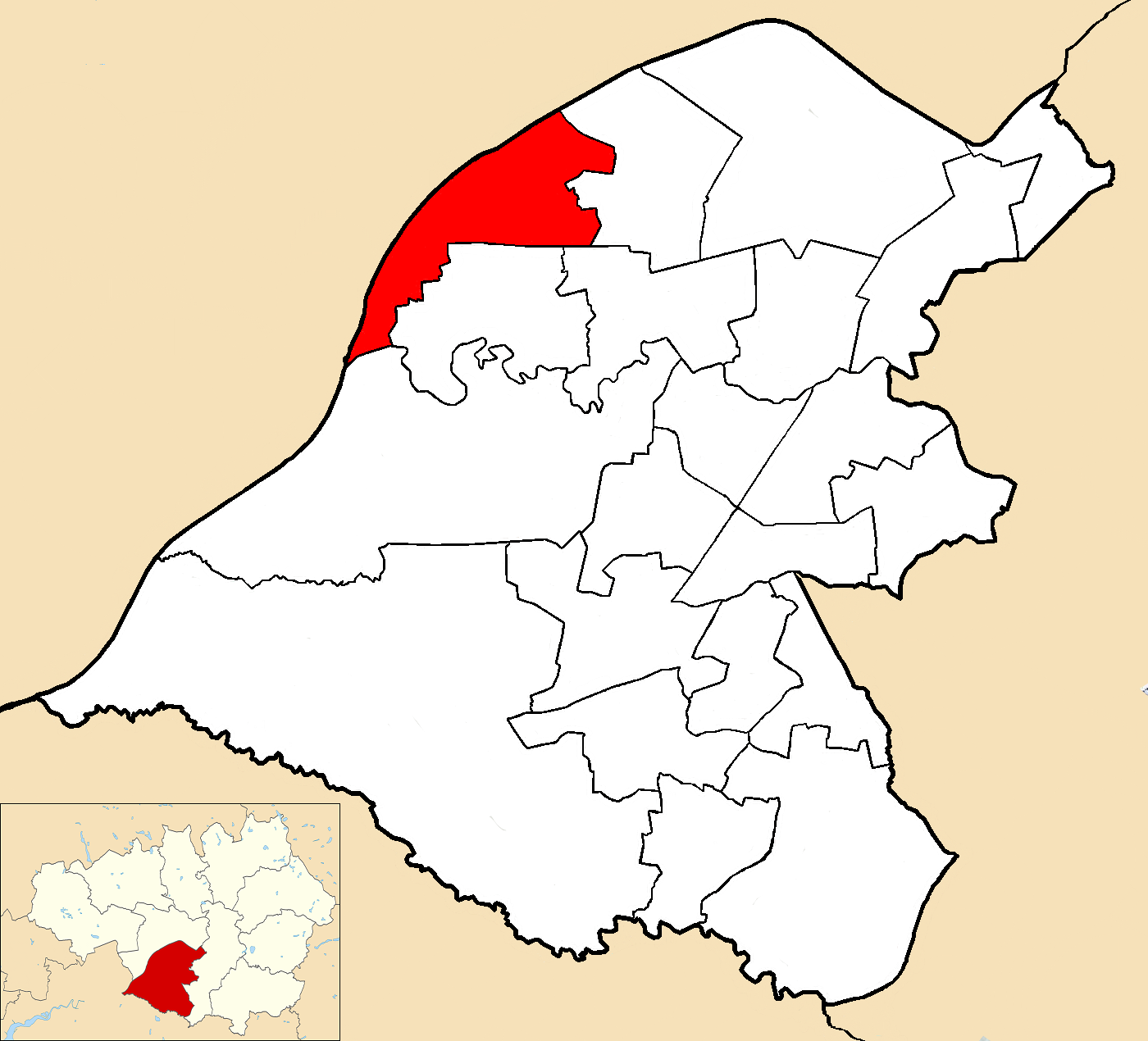
- Davyhulme West within Trafford
- Population: 10,006
- Metropolitan borough: Trafford
- Metropolitan county: Greater Manchester
- Country: England
- Sovereign state: United Kingdom
- UK Parliament: Stretford and Urmston
- Councillors: Graham Whitham (Labour); Karina Carter (Labour); Sue Maitland (Labour)

Davyhulme West is an electoral ward of Trafford, Greater Manchester, covering the western half of Davyhulme and a small part of Flixton.

== Councillors ==
Since 2022, the councillors are Graham Whitham (Labour), Karina Carter (Labour) and Sue Maitland (Labour).

Election	Councillor	Councillor	Councillor
1973	George Carnall (Con)	Albert Williams (Con)	H. Liddiard (Con)
1975	George Carnall (Con)	Albert Williams (Con)	Donald Harding (Con)
1976	George Carnall (Con)	Albert Williams (Con)	Donald Harding (Con)
1978	George Carnall (Con)	Albert Williams (Con)	Donald Harding (Con)
1979	George Carnall (Con)	Albert Williams (Con)	Susan Hodgson (Lib)
Dec 1979	George Carnall (Con)	Donald Harding (Con)	Susan Hodgson (Lib)
1980	George Carnall (Con)	A. Stringer (Lab)	Susan Hodgson (Lib)
Jun 1981	George Carnall (Con)	A. Stringer (Lab)	Laura Seex (Lab)
1982	John Lamb (Con)	A. Stringer (Lab)	Laura Seex (Lab)
1983	John Lamb (Con)	A. Stringer (Lab)	Benita Dirikis (Con)
1984	John Lamb (Con)	Laura Seex (Lab)	Benita Dirikis (Con)
1986	Alan Hodson (Lab)	Laura Seex (Lab)	Benita Dirikis (Con)
1987	Alan Hodson (Lab)	Laura Seex (Lab)	Philip Bates (Con)
1988	Alan Hodson (Lab)	John Ackerley (Con)	Philip Bates (Con)
1990	M. Bates (Con)	John Ackerley (Con)	Philip Bates (Con)
1991	M. Bates (Con)	John Ackerley (Con)	Philip Bates (Con)
1992	M. Bates (Con)	John Ackerley (Con)	Philip Bates (Con)
1994	M. Bates (Con)	John Ackerley (Con)	Philip Bates (Con)
1995	M. Bates (Con)	John Ackerley (Con)	A. Stringer (Lab)
1996	M. Bates (Con)	John Ackerley (Con)	A. Stringer (Lab)
1998	Freda Mottley (Lab)	John Ackerley (Con)	A. Stringer (Lab)
1999	Freda Mottley (Lab)	John Ackerley (Con)	John Reilly (Con)
2000	Freda Mottley (Lab)	John Ackerley (Con)	John Reilly (Con)
2002	June Reilly (Con)	John Ackerley (Con)	John Reilly (Con)
2003	June Reilly (Con)	John Ackerley (Con)	John Reilly (Con)
Jun 2004	John Ackerley (Con)	John Reilly (Con)	June Reilly (Con)
Nov 2004	Nigel Hooley (Con)	John Reilly (Con)	June Reilly (Con)
2006	Nigel Hooley (Con)	John Reilly (Con)	June Reilly (Con)
2007	Nigel Hooley (Con)	John Reilly (Con)	June Reilly (Con)
2008	Brian Shaw (Con)	John Reilly (Con)	June Reilly (Con)
2010	Brian Shaw (Con)	John Reilly (Con)	June Reilly (Con)
2011	Brian Shaw (Con)	John Reilly (Con)	June Reilly (Con)
2012	Brian Shaw (Con)	John Reilly (Con)	June Reilly (Con)
2014	Brian Shaw (Con)	John Reilly (Con)	June Reilly (Con)
2015	Brian Shaw (Con)	John Reilly (Con)	June Reilly (Con)
2016	Brian Shaw (Con)	John Reilly (Con)	June Reilly (Con)
2018	Brian Shaw (Con)	John Reilly (Con)	Graham Whitham (Lab)
2019	Brian Shaw (Con)	Karina Carter (Lab)	Graham Whitham (Lab)
2021	Sue Maitland (Lab)	Karina Carter (Lab)	Graham Whitham (Lab)
2022	Sue Maitland (Lab)	Karina Carter (Lab)	Graham Whitham (Lab)

indicates seat up for re-election. indicates by-election.

== Elections in the 2020s ==
=== May 2022 ===
2022
Party	Candidate	Votes	%	±%
Labour	Graham Whitham*	1,780	55.5	
Conservative	Tracey Haworth	1,094	34.1	
Green	Kevin Chatterton	185	5.8	
Liberal Democrats	Gerald Zuk	137	4.3	
Majority		686	21.4	
Registered electors		7,668		
Turnout		3,209	41.8	
Labour hold		Swing		

=== May 2021 ===
2021
Party	Candidate	Votes	%	±%
Labour	Sue Maitland	1,837	53.0	▲18.8
Conservative	Jonathan Coupe	1,378	39.8	▼8.1
Green	Andrew Horner	146	4.2	▲1.0
Liberal Democrats	Gerald Zuk	81	2.3	▲0.3
Majority		459	13.2	N/A
Rejected ballots		24		
Registered electors		7,745		
Turnout		3,466	44.8	▲3.7
Labour gain from Conservative		Swing	▲13.5	

== Elections in the 2010s ==
=== May 2019 ===
2019
Party	Candidate	Votes	%	±%
Labour	Karina Carter	1,704	53.5	▼4.0
Conservative	Lisa Cooke	965	30.3	▼5.9
UKIP	Paul Regan	279	8.7	▲5.1
Green	Ram Nachiappan	150	4.7	▲2.8
Liberal Democrats	Ged Zuk	86	2.7	▲0.5
Majority		739	23.2	▲6.2
Registered electors		7,650		
Turnout		3,184	41.62	▼8.88
Labour gain from Conservative		Swing		

=== May 2018 ===
2018
Party	Candidate	Votes	%	±%
Labour	Graham Whitham	2,230	57.5	+23.3
Conservative	Christine Turner	1,403	36.2	−11.7
UKIP	Paul Regan	96	2.6	−10.1
Liberal Democrats	David Kierman	81	2.2	+0.2
Green	Rob Raikes	71	1.9	−1.3
Majority		827	17	
Turnout		3,881	50.5	+9.4
Labour gain from Conservative		Swing		

=== May 2016 ===
2016
Party	Candidate	Votes	%	±%
Conservative	Brian Shaw*	1,468	47.9	−3.0
Labour	Sally Carr	1,047	34.2	−7.1
UKIP	Paul Regan	388	12.7	+12.7
Green	Paul Syrett	97	3.2	−4.6
Liberal Democrats	James Eisen	62	2.0	+2.0
Majority		421	13.7	−4.2
Turnout		3,065	41.1	−29.0
Conservative hold		Swing		

=== May 2015 ===
2015
Party	Candidate	Votes	%	±%
Conservative	John Reilly*	2,701	50.9	+11.1
Labour	Jayne Dillon	2,195	41.3	+4.2
Green	Aleesha Coupland	413	7.8	+4.3
Majority		506	9.5	+6.9
Turnout		5,309	70.1	+27.2
Conservative hold		Swing		

=== May 2014 ===
2014
Party	Candidate	Votes	%	±%
Conservative	June Reilly*	1,247	39.8	−7.3
Labour	George Devlin	1,164	37.1	−6.3
UKIP	Paul Regan	557	17.8	+17.8
Green	Luka Knezevic	114	3.6	−3.3
Liberal Democrats	Elizabeth Hogg	54	1.7	−0.9
Majority		83	2.6	−1
Turnout		3,136	42.9	+3.8
Conservative hold		Swing		

=== May 2012 ===
2012
Party	Candidate	Votes	%	±%
Conservative	Brian Shaw*	1,345	47.1	−4.4
Labour	George Devlin	1,241	43.4	+4.4
Green	Christine McLaughlin	196	6.9	+1.1
Liberal Democrats	Elizabeth Hogg	75	2.6	−1.1
Majority		104	3.6	−8.9
Turnout		2,857	39.1	−3.8
Conservative hold		Swing		

=== May 2011 ===
2011
Party	Candidate	Votes	%	±%
Conservative	John Reilly*	1,666	51.5	−3.5
Labour	Joyce Acton	1,261	39.0	+39.0
Green	Jonathan Carr	189	5.8	−5.3
Liberal Democrats	Elizabeth Hogg	119	3.7	−30.2
Majority		405	12.5	−8.7
Turnout		3,235	42.9	−21.8
Conservative hold		Swing		

=== May 2010 ===
2010
Party	Candidate	Votes	%	±%
Conservative	June Reilly*	2,678	55.0	−6.5
Liberal Democrats	Elizabeth Hogg	1,648	33.9	+23.7
Green	Joe Westbrook	541	11.1	+6.3
Majority		1,030	21.2	−16.9
Turnout		4,867	64.7	+27.7
Conservative hold		Swing		

== Elections in the 2000s ==
=== May 2008 ===
2008
Party	Candidate	Votes	%	±%
Conservative	Brian Shaw	1,755	61.5	+0.9
Labour	Kevin Procter	669	23.5	−6.8
Liberal Democrats	Simon Wright	292	10.2	+10.2
Green	Joe Ryan	137	4.8	−4.3
Majority		1,086	38.1	+7.7
Turnout		2,853	37.0	−2.2
Conservative hold		Swing		

=== May 2007 ===
2007
Party	Candidate	Votes	%	±%
Conservative	John Reilly*	1,784	60.6	−0.8
Labour	Philip Morgan	891	30.3	+2.0
Green	Margaret Westbrook	267	9.1	−1.2
Majority		893	30.4	−2.7
Turnout		2,942	39.2	+0.5
Conservative hold		Swing		

=== May 2006 ===
2006
Party	Candidate	Votes	%	±%
Conservative	June Reilly*	1,735	61.4	−1.0
Labour	Kevin Procter	801	28.3	−3.2
Green	Margaret Westbrook	292	10.3	+10.3
Majority		934	33.1	+4.3
Turnout		2,828	38.7	−9.8
Conservative hold		Swing		

=== November 2004 (by-election) ===
By-Election 25 November 2004
Party	Candidate	Votes	%	±%
Conservative	Nigel Hooley	1,070	52.2	−3.4
Labour	Bill Clarke	757	36.9	+8.1
Liberal Democrats	Alan Vernon	222	10.8	−4.8
Majority		313	15.3	−13.5
Turnout		2,049	27.2	−21.3
Conservative hold		Swing		

=== May 2004 ===
2004 (after boundary changes)
Party	Candidate	Votes	%	±%
Conservative	John Ackerley*	1,977	21.1	
Conservative	John Reilly*	1,948	20.8	
Conservative	June Reilly*	1,921	20.5	
Labour	Freda Mottley	1,024	10.9	
Labour	Philip Morgan	1,002	10.7	
Labour	Kevin Procter	930	9.9	
Liberal Democrats	Simon Wright	555	5.9	
Turnout		9,357	48.5	
Conservative win (new seat)				
Conservative win (new seat)				
Conservative win (new seat)				

=== May 2003 ===
2003
Party	Candidate	Votes	%	±%
Conservative	John Reilly*	2,525	60.1	+8.4
Labour	Dolores O'Sullivan	1,674	39.9	−8.5
Majority		851	20.2	+16.9
Turnout		4,199	55.9	−0.7
Conservative hold		Swing		

=== May 2002 ===
2002
Party	Candidate	Votes	%	±%
Conservative	June Reilly	2,189	51.7	−11.3
Labour	Freda Mottley*	2,049	48.4	+11.4
Majority		140	3.3	−22.7
Turnout		4,238	56.6	+16.4
Conservative gain from Labour		Swing		

=== May 2000 ===
2000
Party	Candidate	Votes	%	±%
Conservative	John Ackerley*	1,931	63.0	+14.7
Labour	Karina Carter	1,135	37.0	−10.9
Majority		796	26.0	+25.6
Turnout		3,066	40.2	−1.3
Conservative hold		Swing		

== Elections in the 1990s ==
1999
Party	Candidate	Votes	%	±%
Conservative	Reilly	1,536	48.3	+0.1
Labour	Gray	1,523	47.9	−0.7
Liberal Democrats	ME Clarke	120	3.8	+3.8
Majority		13	0.4	
Turnout		3,179	41.5	+3.1
Conservative gain from Labour		Swing		

1998
Party	Candidate	Votes	%	±%
Labour	F. Mottley	1,449	48.6	−1.2
Conservative	J. R. Reilly	1,438	48.2	−2.0
Socialist Labour	J. D. Flannery	95	3.2	+3.2
Majority		11	0.4	+0.1
Turnout		2,982	38.4	−4.6
Labour gain from Conservative		Swing		

1996
Party	Candidate	Votes	%	±%
Conservative	J. K. Ackerley*	1,697	50.2	+7.7
Labour	F. Mottley	1,686	49.8	−0.4
Majority		11	0.3	−7.4
Turnout		3,383	43.0	−3.8
Conservative hold		Swing		

1995
Party	Candidate	Votes	%	±%
Labour	A. Stringer	1,849	50.2	+6.6
Conservative	P. Bates*	1,565	42.5	−3.2
Liberal Democrats	D. M. Browne	267	7.3	−3.4
Majority		284	7.7	+5.6
Turnout		3,681	46.8	+0.9
Labour gain from Conservative		Swing		

1994
Party	Candidate	Votes	%	±%
Conservative	M. Bates*	1,653	45.7	−10.9
Labour	A. Stringer	1,578	43.6	+5.8
Liberal Democrats	D. M. Browne	388	10.7	+5.2
Majority		75	2.1	−16.7
Turnout		3,619	45.9	+2.7
Conservative hold		Swing		

1992
Party	Candidate	Votes	%	±%
Conservative	J. K. Ackerley*	2,162	56.6	+4.2
Labour	A. Stringer	1,445	37.8	+0.7
Liberal Democrats	M. E. Clarke	211	5.5	−5.0
Majority		717	18.8	+3.5
Turnout		3,818	43.2	−5.5
Conservative hold		Swing		

1991
Party	Candidate	Votes	%	±%
Conservative	P. Bates*	2,042	52.4	+2.2
Labour	A. G. Hodson	1,445	37.1	−12.7
Liberal Democrats	M. E. Clarke	408	10.5	+10.5
Majority		597	15.3	+14.9
Turnout		3,895	48.7	−2.1
Conservative hold		Swing		

1990
Party	Candidate	Votes	%	±%
Conservative	M. Bates	2,033	50.2	+0.1
Labour	A. G. Hodson*	2,015	49.8	+6.8
Majority		18	0.4	−6.7
Turnout		4,048	50.8	−0.7
Conservative gain from Labour		Swing		

== Elections in the 1980s ==
1988
Party	Candidate	Votes	%	±%
Conservative	J. K. Ackerley	2,117	50.1	+1.5
Labour	L. M. Seex*	1,818	43.0	+11.7
Liberal Democrats	D. J. Martin	291	6.9	−13.2
Majority		299	7.1	−10.2
Turnout		4,226	51.5	−5.0
Conservative gain from Labour		Swing		

1987
Party	Candidate	Votes	%	±%
Conservative	P. Bates	2,314	48.6	+12.7
Labour	F. Mottley	1,490	31.3	−11.2
Liberal	M. E. Clarke	958	20.1	−1.5
Majority		824	17.3	+10.7
Turnout		4,762	56.5	+9.3
Conservative hold		Swing		

1986
Party	Candidate	Votes	%	±%
Labour	A. G. Hodson	1,683	42.5	−4.9
Conservative	P. Bates	1,421	35.9	−8.2
Liberal	M. E. Clarke	856	21.6	+21.6
Majority		262	6.6	+3.3
Turnout		3,960	47.2	−1.7
Labour gain from Conservative		Swing		

1984
Party	Candidate	Votes	%	±%
Labour	L. M. Seex	1,997	47.4	+5.4
Conservative	D. Makin	1,857	44.1	−1.3
SDP	K. W. Bower	358	8.5	−4.1
Majority		140	3.3	−0.1
Turnout		4,212	48.9	−2.2
Labour hold		Swing		

1983
Party	Candidate	Votes	%	±%
Conservative	B. M. Dirikis	1,950	45.4	+0.5
Labour	L. M. Seex*	1,805	42.0	+12.6
SDP	K. W. Bower	539	12.6	−13.1
Majority		145	3.4	−12.0
Turnout		4,294	51.1	+3.6
Conservative gain from Labour		Swing		

1982
Party	Candidate	Votes	%	±%
Conservative	J. T. Lamb	1,781	44.9	+7.1
Labour	A. G. Hodson	1,168	29.4	−9.3
SDP	H. Laffey	1,020	25.7	+25.7
Majority		613	15.4	+14.5
Turnout		3,969	47.5	+3.0
Conservative hold		Swing		

By-Election 11 June 1981
Party	Candidate	Votes	%	±%
Labour	L. M. Seex	1,417	43.3	+4.6
Conservative	D. P. Harding	1,242	37.9	+1.0
Liberal	J. A. Cottrell	617	18.8	−4.7
Majority		175	5.3	+4.4
Turnout		3,276	39.7	−4.8
Labour gain from Liberal		Swing		

1980
Party	Candidate	Votes	%	±%
Labour	A. Stringer	1,411	38.7	−0.6
Conservative	D. P. Harding*	1,378	37.8	+37.8
Liberal	L. O'Rourke	856	23.5	−37.2
Majority		33	0.9	−20.5
Turnout		3,645	44.5	−30.5
Labour gain from Conservative		Swing		

== Elections in the 1970s ==
By-Election 13 December 1979
Party	Candidate	Votes	%	±%
Conservative	D. P. Harding	858	41.3	+41.3
Labour	A. Stringer	752	36.2	+3.1
Liberal	L. O'Rourke	466	22.4	−38.3
Majority		106	5.1	−16.3
Turnout		2,076	20.0	−55.0
Conservative hold		Swing		

1979
Party	Candidate	Votes	%	±%
Liberal	S. Hodgson	4,748	60.7	+60.7
Labour	R. A. Tully	3,071	39.3	+1.9
Majority		1,677	21.4	−3.8
Turnout		7,819	75.0	+39.2
Liberal gain from Conservative		Swing		

1978
Party	Candidate	Votes	%	±%
Conservative	G. H. Carnall*	2,291	62.6	+2.2
Labour	L. M. Seex	1,370	37.4	+7.3
Majority		921	25.2	−5.1
Turnout		3,661	35.8	−5.4
Conservative hold		Swing		

1976
Party	Candidate	Votes	%	±%
Conservative	A. E. Williams*	2,432	60.4	+1.5
Labour	L. M. Seex	1,212	30.1	+3.6
Liberal	D. J. Gilbert	384	9.5	−5.1
Majority		1,220	30.3	−2.0
Turnout		4,028	41.2	−1.8
Conservative hold		Swing		

1975
Party	Candidate	Votes	%	±%
Conservative	D. P. Harding	2,414	58.9	
Labour	L. M. Seex	1,088	26.5	
Liberal	E. F. Teal	598	14.6	
Majority		1,326	32.3	
Turnout		4,100	43.0	
Conservative hold		Swing		

1973
Party	Candidate	Votes	%	±%
Conservative	G. H. Carnall	1,964	54.6	
Conservative	A. E. Williams	1,908		
Conservative	H. P. Liddiard	1,897		
Labour	B. Elliott	1,636	45.4	
Labour	A. Stringer	1,538		
Labour	R. Taylor	1,479		
Majority		261		
Turnout		3,600	37.6	
Conservative win (new seat)				
Conservative win (new seat)				
Conservative win (new seat)				
