= 2002 Trafford Metropolitan Borough Council election =

2002 UK local government election

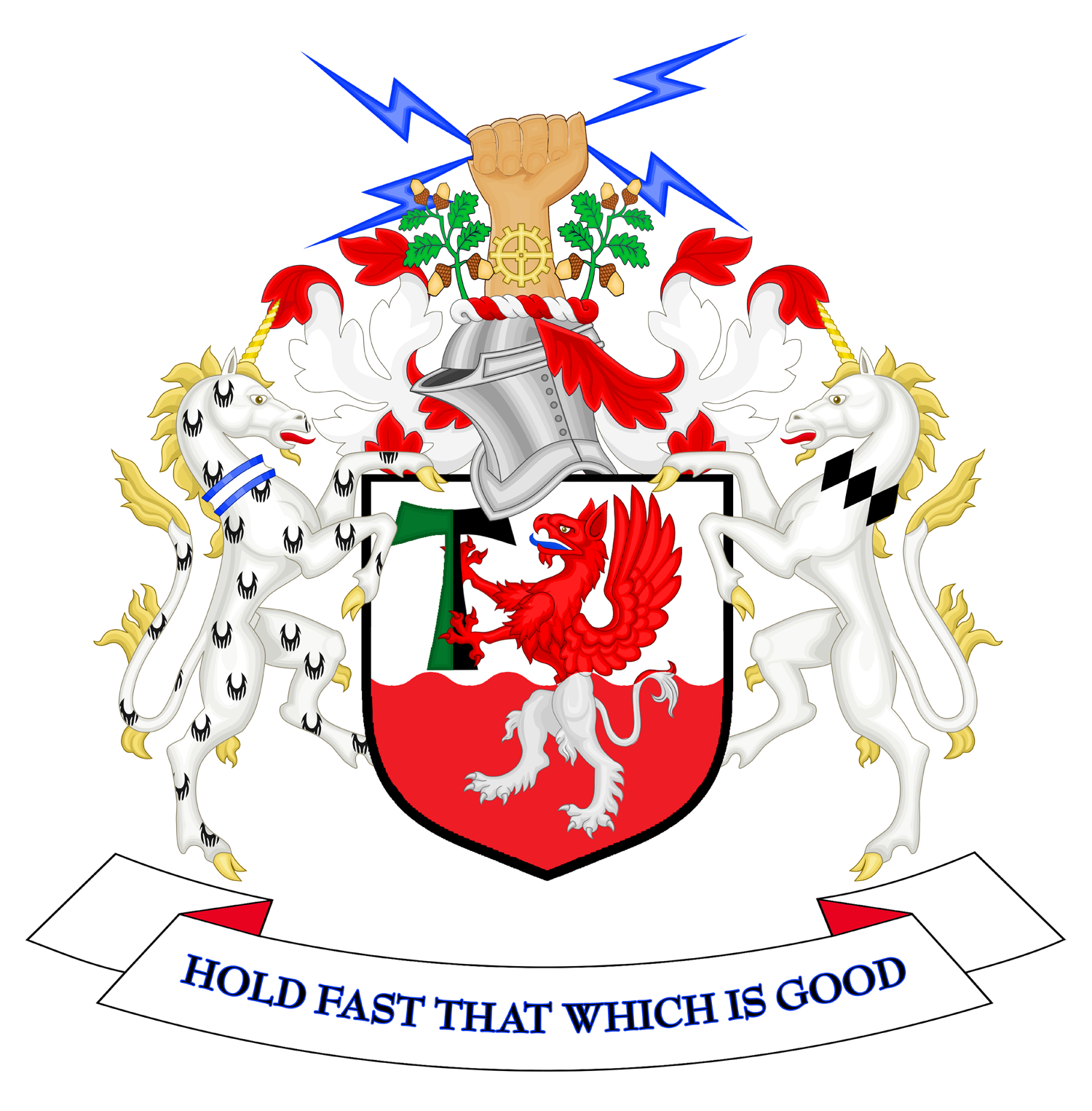
- 2 May 2002

21 of 63 seats to Trafford Metropolitan Borough Council 32 seats needed for a majority
	First party	Second party	Third party
Leader	David Acton	Frank Eadie	Ray Bowker
Party	Labour	Conservative	Liberal Democrats
Leader's seat	Urmston	Davyhulme East	Village
Last election	10 seats, 37.0%	10 seats, 51.5%	1 seats, 11.1%
Seats before	33	27	3
Seats won	11	9	1
Seats after	32	28	3
Seat change	▼1	▲1	Steady
Popular vote	34,670	37,938	10,071
Percentage	41.2%	45.1%	12.0%
Swing	▲4.2%	▼6.4%	▲0.9%
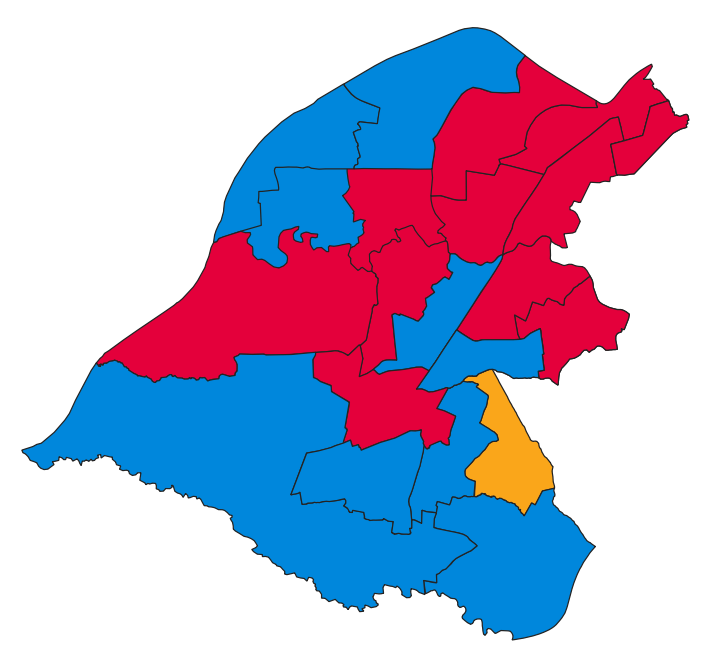
- Map of results of 2002 election
Leader of the Council before election
David Acton
Labour
Leader of the Council after election
David Acton
Labour

Elections to Trafford Council were held on 2 May 2002. One third of the council was up for election, with each successful candidate to serve a two-year term of office, expiring in 2004, due to the boundary changes and 'all-out' elections due to take place that year. The Labour Party retained overall control of the council. Overall turnout was 52.3%.

== Election result ==
Trafford Council Election 2002
Party	Votes		Seats			Full Council	
Labour Party	34,670 (41.2%)	▲4.2	11 (52.4%)	11 / 21	Steady	32 (50.8%)	32 / 63
Conservative Party	37,938 (45.1%)	▼6.4	9 (42.9%)	9 / 21	▲1	28 (44.4%)	28 / 63
Liberal Democrats	10,071 (12.0%)	▲0.9	1 (4.8%)	1 / 21	Steady	3 (4.8%)	3 / 63
Green Party	653 (0.8%)	N/A	0 (0.0%)	0 / 21	N/A	0 (0.0%)	0 / 63
Independent	636 (0.8%)	▲0.4	0 (0.0%)	0 / 21	Steady	0 (0.0%)	0 / 63
Socialist Labour Party	189 (0.2%)	N/A	0 (0.0%)	0 / 21	N/A	1 (0.0%)	0 / 63

↓
32	3	28

== Ward results ==
=== Altrincham ===
Altrincham
Party	Candidate	Votes	%	±%
Conservative	Susan Fildes*	2,503	54.5	−4.6
Labour	Peter Baugh	1,472	32.0	+4.9
Liberal Democrats	Christopher Gaskell	621	13.5	+6.7
Majority		1,031	22.5	−9.5
Turnout		4,596	52.8	+20.4
Conservative hold		Swing		

=== Bowdon ===
Bowdon
Party	Candidate	Votes	%	±%
Conservative	Marie Harney*	3,345	63.9	−9.1
Labour	Helen Walsh	771	14.7	+2.4
Liberal Democrats	Roger Legge	762	14.6	+0.0
Green	Bridget Green	359	6.9	+6.9
Majority		2,574	49.2	−9.2
Turnout		5,237	56.7	+24.2
Conservative hold		Swing		

=== Broadheath ===
Broadheath
Party	Candidate	Votes	%	±%
Labour	Jane Baugh*	2,454	49.9	+6.0
Conservative	Alexander Williams	2,060	41.9	−6.7
Independent	Guy Morgan	404	8.2	+8.2
Majority		394	8.0	
Turnout		4,918	57.3	+19.8
Labour hold		Swing		

=== Brooklands ===
Brooklands
Party	Candidate	Votes	%	±%
Conservative	David Higgins*	2,378	56.6	−9.7
Labour	Philip Morgan	1,086	25.9	+5.3
Liberal Democrats	Kenneth Clarke	737	17.5	+4.4
Majority		1,292	30.7	−15.0
Turnout		4,201	54.3	+16.4
Conservative hold		Swing		

=== Bucklow ===
Bucklow
Party	Candidate	Votes	%	±%
Labour	Graham Kanes*	1,759	75.3	+2.6
Conservative	James Davies	576	24.7	−2.6
Majority		1,183	50.6	+5.2
Turnout		2,335	41.0	+22.4
Labour hold		Swing		

=== Clifford ===
Clifford
Party	Candidate	Votes	%	±%
Labour	Peter Mitchell*	2,256	75.8	−0.1
Conservative	Alexander Kelly	428	14.4	−3.2
Green	Anne Power	294	9.9	+9.9
Majority		1,828	61.4	+3.1
Turnout		2,978	40.0	+17.6
Labour hold		Swing		

=== Davyhulme East ===
Davyhulme East
Party	Candidate	Votes	%	±%
Conservative	Edith Eadie*	2,126	57.4	−9.7
Labour	Nigel Roberts	1,581	42.7	+9.7
Majority		545	14.7	−19.4
Turnout		3,707	52.2	+19.7
Conservative hold		Swing		

=== Davyhulme West ===
Davyhulme West
Party	Candidate	Votes	%	±%
Conservative	June Reilly	2,189	51.7	−11.3
Labour	Freda Mottley*	2,049	48.4	+11.4
Majority		140	3.3	−22.7
Turnout		4,238	56.6	+16.4
Conservative gain from Labour		Swing		

=== Flixton ===
Flixton
Party	Candidate	Votes	%	±%
Conservative	Keith Summerfield	2,070	51.5	−9.0
Labour	Karina Carter	1,946	48.5	+8.9
Majority		124	3.0	−17.9
Turnout		4,016	53.8	+15.8
Conservative hold		Swing		

=== Hale ===
Hale
Party	Candidate	Votes	%	±%
Conservative	Ian Mullins	3,333	69.1	−6.0
Labour	Beverly Harrison	828	17.2	+4.8
Liberal Democrats	Richard Elliott	664	13.8	+1.3
Majority		2,505	51.9	−10.7
Turnout		4,825	58.0	+24.2
Conservative hold		Swing		

=== Longford ===
Longford
Party	Candidate	Votes	%	±%
Labour	Judith Lloyd*	2,174	62.3	+7.8
Conservative	John Schofield	1,318	37.7	−7.8
Majority		856	24.6	+15.6
Turnout		3,492	48.5	+13.9
Labour hold		Swing		

=== Mersey-St. Mary's ===
Mersey St. Marys
Party	Candidate	Votes	%	±%
Conservative	Brian Rigby*	2,914	55.8	−9.0
Labour	Sophie Taylor	1,621	31.0	+8.2
Liberal Democrats	Graham Rogers	687	13.2	+0.7
Majority		1,293	24.8	−17.2
Turnout		5,222	54.6	+22.1
Conservative hold		Swing		

=== Park ===
Park
Party	Candidate	Votes	%	±%
Labour	Ian McDermott	1,750	62.8	+7.4
Conservative	Pervez Nakvi	1,038	37.2	−7.4
Majority		712	25.6	+14.8
Turnout		2,788	46.8	+22.0
Labour hold		Swing		

=== Priory ===
Priory
Party	Candidate	Votes	%	±%
Labour	Barry Brotherton*	1,909	48.5	−0.5
Conservative	Joseph Garner	1,183	30.0	−3.9
Liberal Democrats	Michael Riley	846	21.5	+4.4
Majority		726	18.5	+3.4
Turnout		3,938	51.3	+10.4
Labour hold		Swing		

=== Sale Moor ===
Sale Moor
Party	Candidate	Votes	%	±%
Labour	Philip Gratrix*	1,906	47.5	+3.0
Conservative	Christopher Lynch	1,311	32.7	−11.0
Liberal Democrats	Derek Hurst	564	14.1	+2.3
Independent	Majorie Hepburn	232	5.8	+5.8
Majority		595	14.8	+14.0
Turnout		4,013	53.2	+19.6
Labour hold		Swing		

=== St. Martin's ===
St. Martin's
Party	Candidate	Votes	%	±%
Labour	Leonard Murkin*	2,737	66.4	+20.9
Conservative	Dilraz Butt	1,386	33.6	−11.4
Majority		1,351	32.8	+32.3
Turnout		4,123	49.8	+19.9
Labour hold		Swing		

=== Stretford ===
Stretford
Party	Candidate	Votes	%	±%
Labour	Stephen Adshead*	2,224	58.3	+1.4
Conservative	John Lamb	1,403	36.8	−6.3
Socialist Labour	Prudence Hibberd	189	5.0	+5.0
Majority		821	21.5	+7.7
Turnout		3,816	50.8	+18.3
Labour hold		Swing		

=== Talbot ===
Talbot
Party	Candidate	Votes	%	±%
Labour	Simon Beaumont*	1,824	77.2	+10.6
Conservative	George Manley	538	22.8	−2.8
Majority		1,286	54.4	+13.4
Turnout		2,362	37.9	+16.4
Labour hold		Swing		

=== Timperley ===
Timperley
Party	Candidate	Votes	%	±%
Conservative	Anne Bowker*	2,426	53.4	−0.1
Liberal Democrats	Catherine Smith	2,120	46.6	+18.6
Majority		306	6.8	−18.7
Turnout		4,546	52.4	+18.4
Conservative hold		Swing		

=== Urmston ===
Urmston
Party	Candidate	Votes	%	±%
Labour	David Acton*	2,323	56.8	+2.9
Conservative	Christine Turner	1,765	43.2	−3.0
Majority		558	13.6	+5.9
Turnout		4,088	54.0	+12.7
Labour hold		Swing		

=== Village ===
Village
Party	Candidate	Votes	%	±%
Liberal Democrats	Douglas Fishwick	3,070	65.1	+9.8
Conservative	Patricia Morris	1,648	34.9	+0.5
Majority		1,422	30.2	+9.3
Turnout		4,718	50.6	+12.5
Liberal Democrats hold		Swing		

== By-elections between 2002 and 2003 ==
Davyhulme East By-Election 28 November 2002
Party	Candidate	Votes	%	±%
Conservative	M. D. Cornes	2,030	57.6	+0.2
Labour	N. K. Roberts	1,493	42.4	−0.2
Majority		537	15.2	+0.5
Turnout		3,523	50.0	−2.2
Conservative hold		Swing		
