= 1975 Trafford Metropolitan Borough Council election =

1975 UK local government election

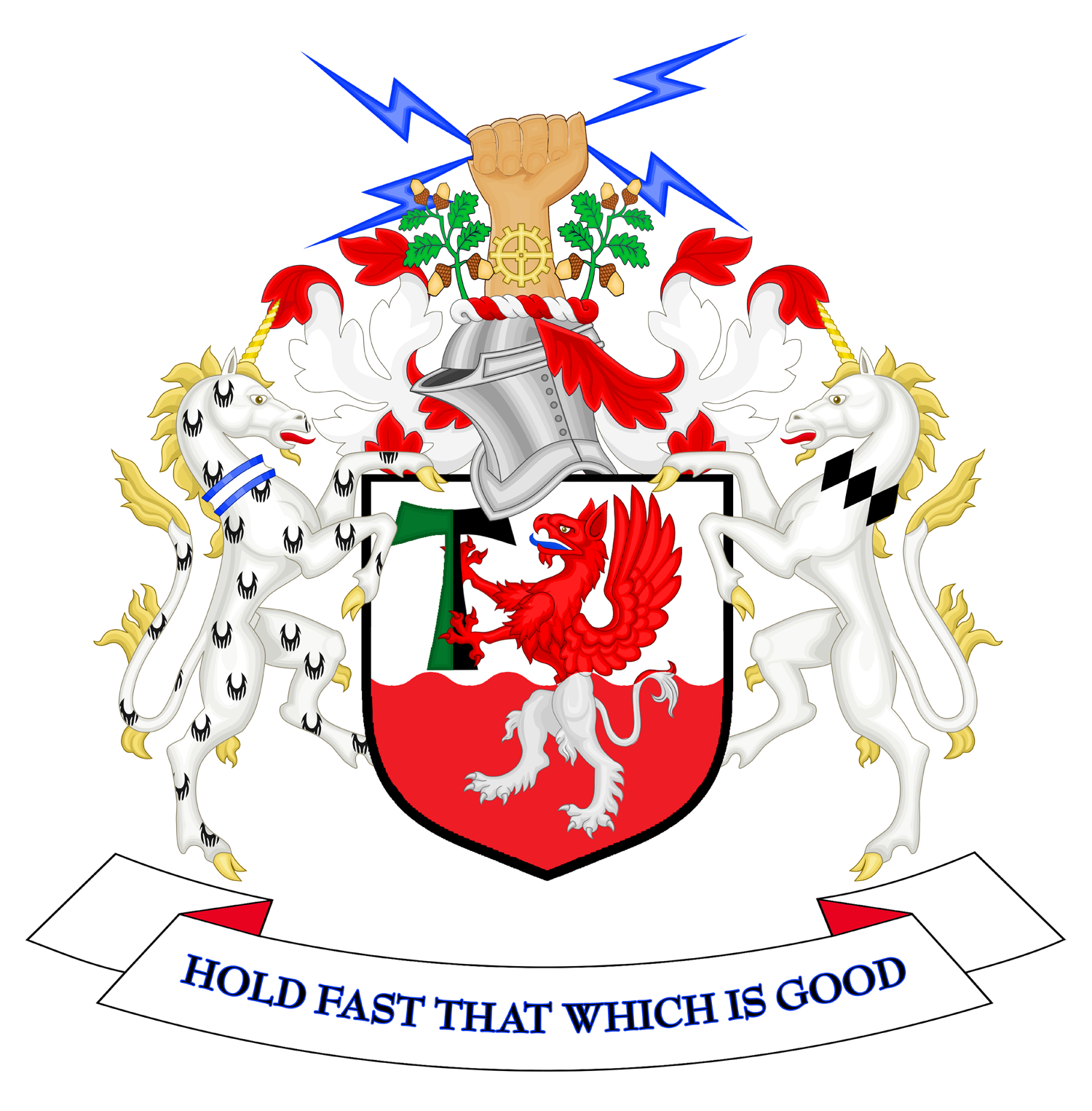
- 1 May 1975

22 of 63 seats (One Third and one by-election) to Trafford Metropolitan Borough Council 32 seats needed for a majority
	First party	Second party	Third party
Leader	Mike King	Bert Pyper	Cecil Fink
Party	Conservative	Labour	Liberal
Leader's seat	St. Martin's	Park	Brooklands
Last election	32 seats, 45.0%	19 seats, 33.1%	12 seats, 20.9%
Seats before	33	18	12
Seats won	21	1	0
Seats after	42	13	8
Seat change	▲9	▼5	▼4
Popular vote	39,914	15,821	15,170
Percentage	56.1%	22.2%	21.3%
Swing	▲11.1%	▼10.9%	▲0.4%
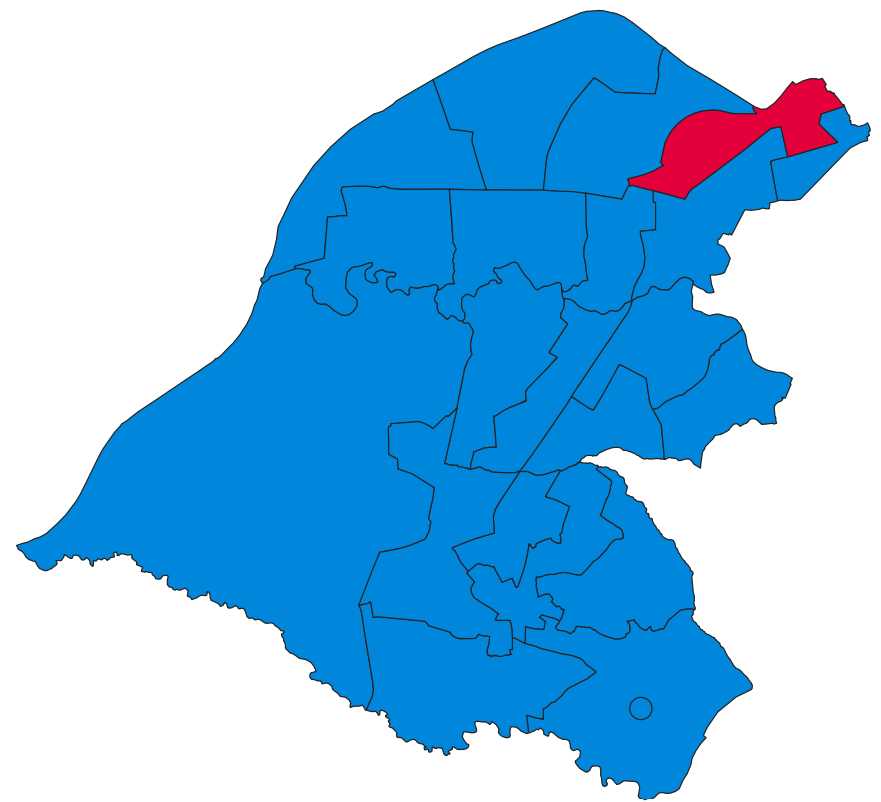
- Map of results of 1975 election
Leader of the Council before election
Frank Eadie
Conservative
Leader of the Council after election
Mike King
Conservative

Elections to Trafford Council were held on Thursday, 1 May 1975. One third of the council was up for election, with each successful candidate to serve a four-year term of office, expiring in 1979. These were the first Borough elections to be held in Trafford since it received its Royal Charter (and effectively took over from its predecessor Districts and Municipal Boroughs) in 1974. The Conservative Party retained overall control of the council.

== Election result ==
Party	Votes		Seats			Full Council	
Conservative Party	39,914 (56.1%)	▲11.1	21 (95.5%)	21 / 22	▲9	42 (66.7%)	42 / 63
Labour Party	15,821 (22.2%)	▼10.9	1 (4.5%)	1 / 22	▼5	13 (20.6%)	13 / 63
Liberal Party	15,170 (21.3%)	▲0.4	0 (0.0%)	0 / 22	▼4	8 (12.7%)	8 / 63
Communist Party	262 (0.4%)	▼0.2	0 (0.0%)	0 / 22	Steady	0 (0.0%)	0 / 63

↓
13	8	42

== Ward results ==
=== No.1 (Altrincham South West) ===
Altrincham South West
Party	Candidate	Votes	%	±%
Conservative	Albert Whitehurst	1,147	42.9	−9.7
Liberal	J. B. Kenny	806	30.1	N/A
Labour	Robert Crossman	721	27.0	−26.7
Majority		341	12.8	+12.4
Turnout		2,674	41.6	
Conservative hold		Swing		

=== No.2 (Altrincham East) ===
Altrincham East
Party	Candidate	Votes	%	±%
Conservative	Peter Leigh	2,016	47.7	+10.4
Liberal	Roy Richardson*	1,574	37.3	−6.0
Labour	J. Gregory	632	15.0	−6.8
Majority		442	10.5	
Turnout		4,222	44.8	
Conservative gain from Liberal		Swing		

=== No.3 (Altrincham North) ===
Altrincham North
Party	Candidate	Votes	%	±%
Conservative	C. Harrison	1,387	47.9	+8.0
Liberal	Eric Faulkner	803	27.7	−5.8
Labour	Barry Jones	704	24.3	−9.9
Majority		584	20.2	+19.7
Turnout		2,894	44.1	
Conservative hold		Swing		

=== No.4 (Timperley) ===
Timperley
Party	Candidate	Votes	%	±%
Conservative	John Robertson	1,626	47.9	+13.4
Labour	John Webb	1,026	30.2	−8.7
Liberal	C. R. Gibson	741	21.8	−13.6
Majority		600	17.7	
Turnout		3,393	42.6	
Conservative gain from Labour		Swing		

=== No.5 (Mersey-St. Mary’s) ===
Mersey-St. Mary's
Party	Candidate	Votes	%	±%
Conservative	Reginald Bannister*	2,069	56.5	+6.4
Liberal	Kenneth Humber	1,591	43.5	−9.3
Majority		478	13.1	+12.5
Turnout		3,660	41.4	
Conservative hold		Swing		

=== No.6 (St. Martin’s) ===
St. Martin's
Party	Candidate	Votes	%	±%
Conservative	Stanley Brownhill*	2,276	69.1	+17.3
Labour	J. K. Morgan	1,020	30.9	−23.7
Majority		1,256	38.1	+33.1
Turnout		3,296	30.4	
Conservative hold		Swing		

=== No.7 (Sale Moor) ===
Sale Moor
Party	Candidate	Votes	%	±%
Conservative	Anthony Rhodes	1,105	42.4	−2.0
Labour	Barry Brotherton*	888	34.1	−23.1
Liberal	Michael Wood	550	21.1	N/A
Communist	A. H. Burrage	61	2.3	−2.4
Majority		132	8.3	
Turnout		2,604	39.4	
Conservative gain from Labour		Swing		

=== No.8 (St. Anne’s) ===
St. Anne's
Party	Candidate	Votes	%	±%
Conservative	K. R. Newton	1,642	47.3	+9.1
Liberal	Alan Thorpe*	1,195	34.5	−8.2
Labour	David Teasdale	631	18.2	−4.6
Majority		447	12.9	
Turnout		3,468	41.0	
Conservative gain from Liberal		Swing		

=== No.9 (Brooklands) ===
Brooklands
Party	Candidate	Votes	%	±%
Conservative	Jonathan Taylor	2,362	58.0	+9.1
Liberal	Sydney Evans*	1,375	33.7	−20.3
Labour	E. P. M. Wollaston	338	8.3	N/A
Majority		987	24.3	
Turnout		4,075	45.7	
Conservative gain from Liberal		Swing		

=== No.10 (Talbot North) ===
Talbot North
Party	Candidate	Votes	%	±%
Labour	Clifford Cronshaw*	1,406	45.6	−19.7
Conservative	Edward Kelson	950	30.8	−4.8
Liberal	T. A. Dixon	729	23.6	N/A
Majority		456	14.8	−10.7
Turnout		3,085	34.9	
Labour hold		Swing		

=== No.11 (Clifford) ===
Clifford
Party	Candidate	Votes	%	±%
Conservative	Roy Corke	1,309	57.2	+10.3
Labour	John Maher	981	42.8	−15.2
Majority		328	14.4	
Turnout		2,290	34.9	
Conservative gain from Labour		Swing		

=== No.12 (Longford) ===
Longford
Party	Candidate	Votes	%	±%
Conservative	Alexander Kelly*	1,844	53.2	−0.8
Labour	K. Silcock	1,064	30.7	−18.2
Liberal	J. Stockley	557	16.1	N/A
Majority		780	22.5	+21.7
Turnout		3,465	35.6	
Conservative hold		Swing		

=== No.13 (Stretford) ===
Stretford
Party	Candidate	Votes	%	±%
Conservative	Harry Walker*	1,468	63.2	−5.5
Labour	G. R. Scott	588	25.3	−9.0
Liberal	R. K. Sangster	268	11.5	N/A
Majority		880	37.9	+7.4
Turnout		2,324	39.0	
Conservative hold		Swing		

=== No.14 (Park) ===
Park
Party	Candidate	Votes	%	±%
Conservative	John Schofield	1,061	42.8	+4.8
Labour	James Haydock*	1,032	41.6	−20.6
Liberal	W. A. Munden	324	13.1	N/A
Communist	A. Jarratt	61	2.5	−4.9
Majority		29	1.2	
Turnout		2,478	40.0	
Conservative gain from Labour		Swing		

=== No.15 (Bowdon) ===
Bowdon
Party	Candidate	Votes	%	±%
Conservative	John Humphreys*	2,520	71.9	−1.5
Liberal	G. M. R. Willmott	545	15.5	−21.0
Labour	Arthur Johnson	440	12.6	−8.5
Majority		1,975	56.4	+24.9
Turnout		3,505	49.9	
Conservative hold		Swing		

=== No.16 (Hale) ===
Hale (2 vacancies)
Party	Candidate	Votes	%	±%
Conservative	Norman Barrett	3,208	81.3	+13.3
Conservative	Roy Godwin*	3,058	77.5	+9.5
Liberal	Roy Allen	1,047	26.5	+2.0
Majority		2,011	51.0	+9.7
Turnout		3,944	43.6	
Conservative hold		Swing		
Conservative hold		Swing		

=== No.17 (Partington) ===
Partington
Party	Candidate	Votes	%	±%
Conservative	Michael Barltrop	996	46.8	N/A
Labour	C. Younghusband	991	46.6	−27.6
Communist	Eileen Wilkinson	140	6.6	−5.0
Majority		5	0.2	
Turnout		2,127	27.6	
Conservative gain from Labour		Swing		

=== No.18 (Urmston West East) ===
Urmston West East
Party	Candidate	Votes	%	±%
Conservative	Anthony Platt	1,968	54.5	+14.3
Labour	D. T. Taylor	854	23.6	−2.2
Liberal	Gwen Davies*	790	21.9	−16.4
Majority		1,114	30.8	
Turnout		3,612	43.3	
Conservative gain from Liberal		Swing		

=== No.19 (Flixton East Central) ===
Flixton East Central
Party	Candidate	Votes	%	±%
Conservative	Gordon Lumby*	2,363	54.5	+7.1
Liberal	D. J. Gilbert	1,123	25.9	−13.0
Labour	C. Nightingale	851	19.6	+1.0
Majority		1,240	28.6	+23.6
Turnout		4,337	47.6	
Conservative hold		Swing		

=== No.20 (Flixton West) ===
Flixton West
Party	Candidate	Votes	%	±%
Conservative	Donald Harding	2,414	58.9	+2.4
Labour	Laura Seex	1,088	26.5	−20.6
Liberal	E. F. Teal	598	14.6	N/A
Majority		1,326	32.4	+24.9
Turnout		4,100	43.0	
Conservative hold		Swing		

=== No.21 (Davyhulme East) ===
Davyhulme East
Party	Candidate	Votes	%	±%
Conservative	Eric Crosbie*	1,125	50.1	−14.3
Labour	W. J. Williams	566	25.2	−12.5
Liberal	T. M. Owen	554	24.7	N/A
Majority		559	24.9	+0.2
Turnout		2,245	41.6	
Conservative hold		Swing		
