= Trafford Council elections =

Local government elections in Greater Manchester, England

Trafford Council elections are generally held three years out of every four, with a third of the council being elected each time. Trafford Metropolitan Borough Council, generally known as Trafford Council, is the local authority for the metropolitan borough of Trafford in Greater Manchester, England. Since the last boundary changes in 2023, 63 councillors have been elected from 21 wards.

== Council elections ==
One third of the council is elected each year, followed by one year without election.

- 1973 Trafford Metropolitan Borough Council election, held Thursday 10 May.
- 1975 Trafford Metropolitan Borough Council election, held Thursday 1 May.
- 1976 Trafford Metropolitan Borough Council election, held Thursday 6 May.
- 1978 Trafford Metropolitan Borough Council election, held Thursday 4 May.
- 1979 Trafford Metropolitan Borough Council election, held Thursday 3 May.
- 1980 Trafford Metropolitan Borough Council election, held Thursday 1 May.
- 1982 Trafford Metropolitan Borough Council election, held Thursday 6 May.
- 1983 Trafford Metropolitan Borough Council election, held Thursday 5 May.
- 1984 Trafford Metropolitan Borough Council election, held Thursday 3 May.
- 1986 Trafford Metropolitan Borough Council election, held Thursday 8 May.
- 1987 Trafford Metropolitan Borough Council election, held Thursday 7 May.
- 1988 Trafford Metropolitan Borough Council election, held Thursday 5 May.
- 1990 Trafford Metropolitan Borough Council election, held Thursday 4 May.
- 1991 Trafford Metropolitan Borough Council election, held Thursday 2 May.
- 1992 Trafford Metropolitan Borough Council election, held Thursday 7 May.
- 1994 Trafford Metropolitan Borough Council election, held Thursday 5 May.
- 1995 Trafford Metropolitan Borough Council election, held Thursday 4 May.
- 1996 Trafford Metropolitan Borough Council election, held Thursday 2 May.
- 1998 Trafford Metropolitan Borough Council election, held Thursday 7 May.
- 1999 Trafford Metropolitan Borough Council election, held Thursday 6 May.
- 2000 Trafford Metropolitan Borough Council election, held Thursday 4 May.
- 2002 Trafford Metropolitan Borough Council election, held Thursday 2 May.
- 2003 Trafford Metropolitan Borough Council election, held Thursday 1 May.
- 2004 Trafford Metropolitan Borough Council election, held Thursday 10 June. (All seats contested due to boundary changes)
- 2006 Trafford Metropolitan Borough Council election, held Thursday 4 May.
- 2007 Trafford Metropolitan Borough Council election, held Thursday 3 May.
- 2008 Trafford Metropolitan Borough Council election, held Thursday 1 May
- 2010 Trafford Metropolitan Borough Council election, held Thursday 6 May
- 2011 Trafford Metropolitan Borough Council election, held Thursday 5 May
- 2012 Trafford Metropolitan Borough Council election, held Thursday 3 May.
- 2014 Trafford Metropolitan Borough Council election, held Thursday 22 May.
- 2015 Trafford Metropolitan Borough Council election, held Thursday 7 May.
- 2016 Trafford Metropolitan Borough Council election, held Thursday 5 May.
- 2018 Trafford Metropolitan Borough Council election, held Thursday 3 May.
- 2019 Trafford Metropolitan Borough Council election, held Thursday 2 May.
- 2021 Trafford Metropolitan Borough Council election, held Thursday 6 May (delayed from May 2020 due to the coronavirus pandemic).
- 2022 Trafford Metropolitan Borough Council election, held Thursday 5 May.
- 2023 Trafford Metropolitan Borough Council election, held Thursday 4 May (All seats contested due to boundary changes).
- 2024 Trafford Metropolitan Borough Council election, held Thursday 2 May.

== Results maps ==
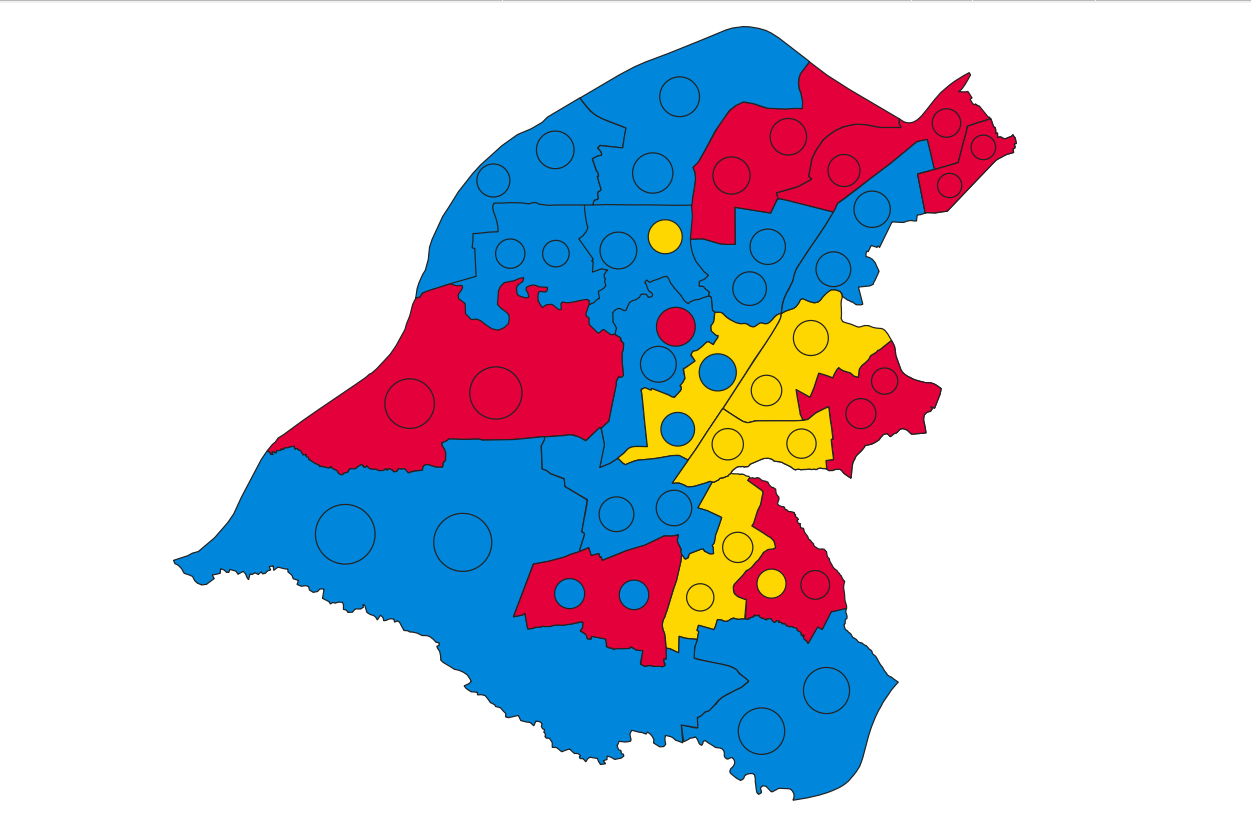
1973 results map

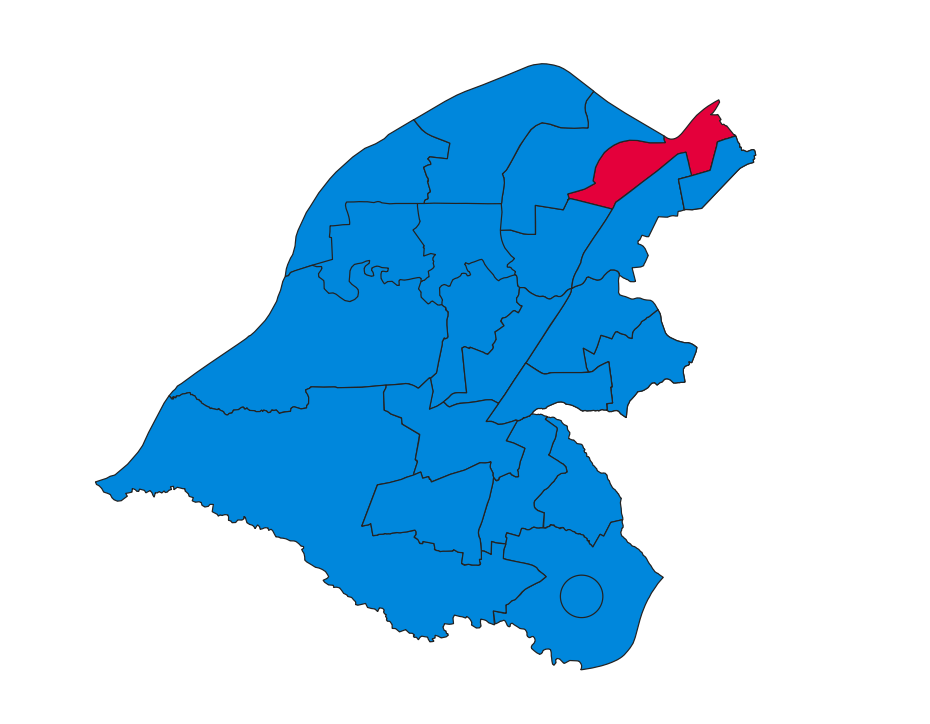
1975 results map

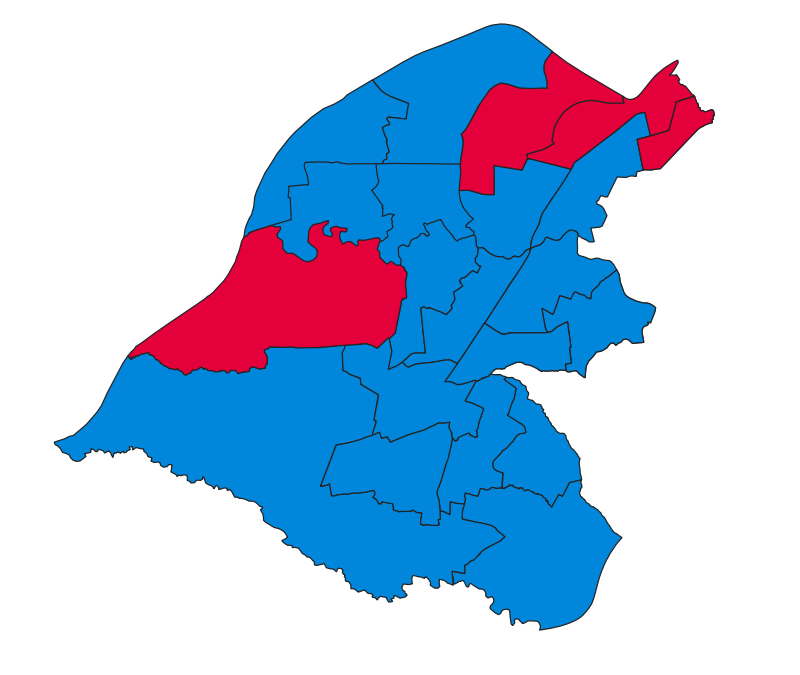
1976 results map

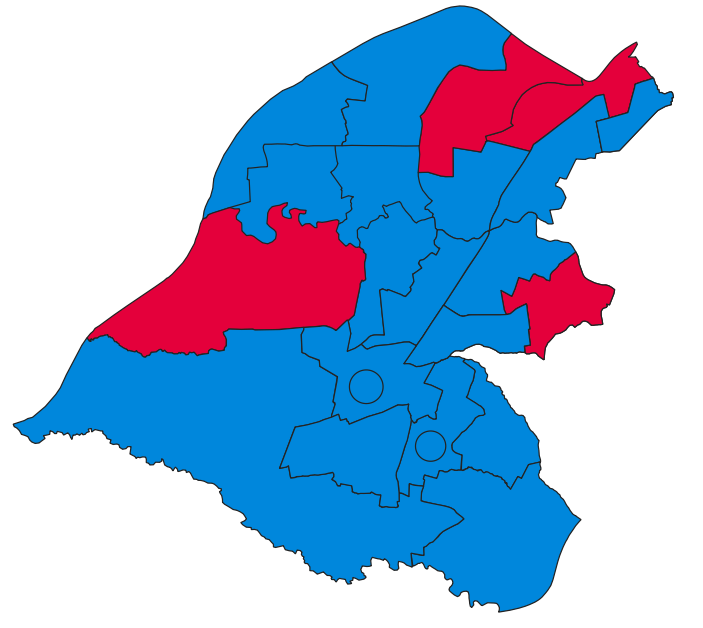
1978 results map

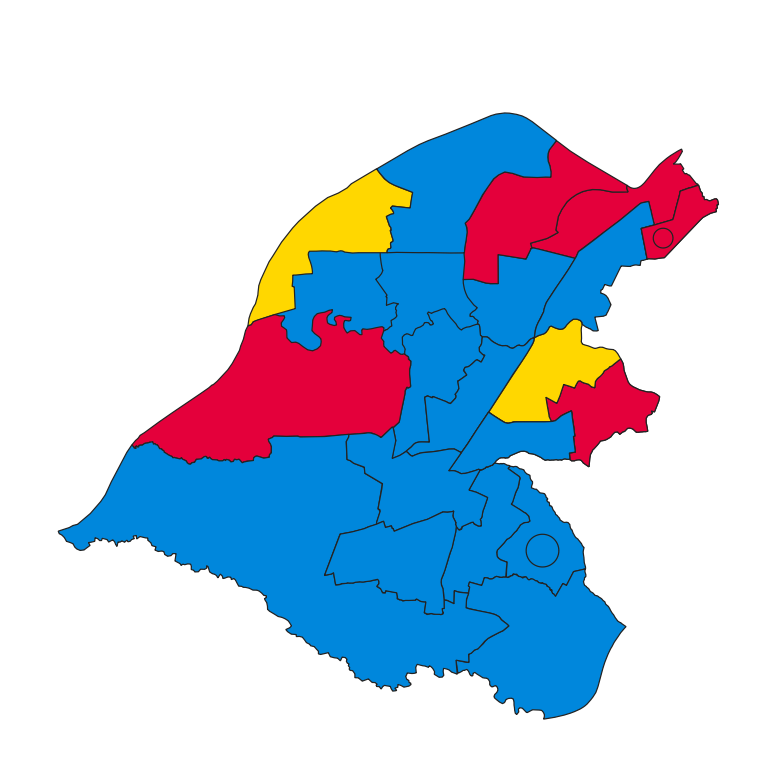
1979 results map

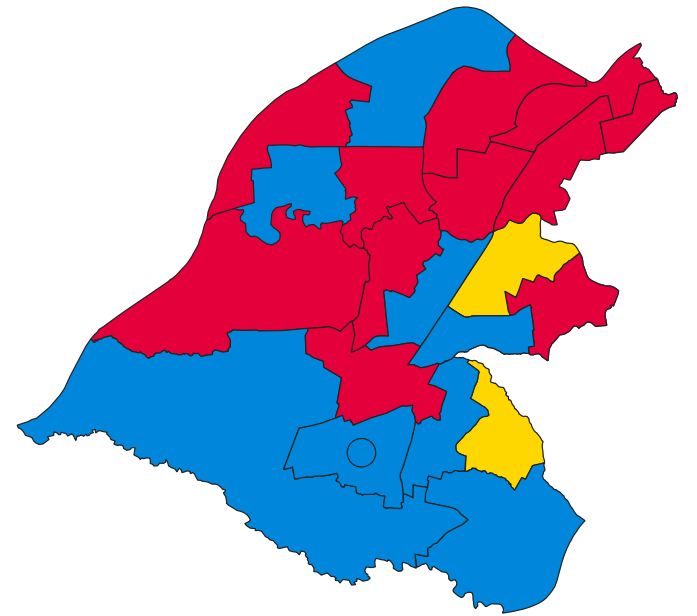
1980 results map

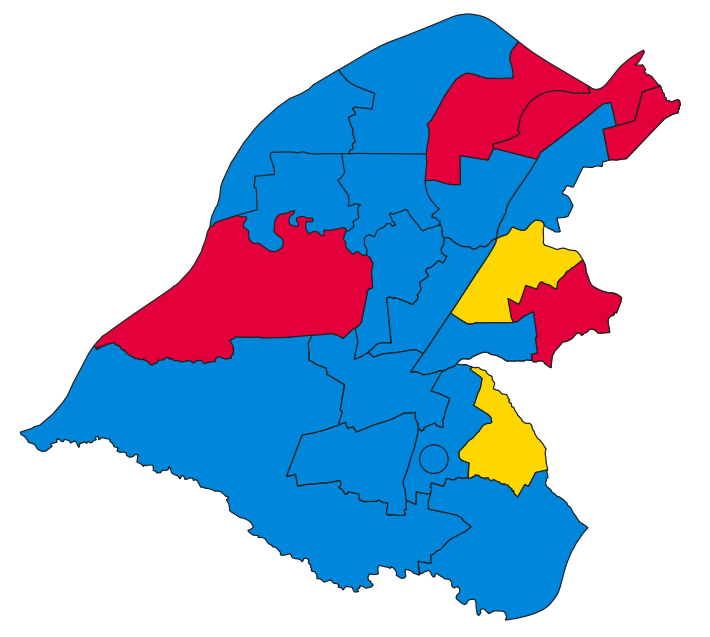
1982 results map

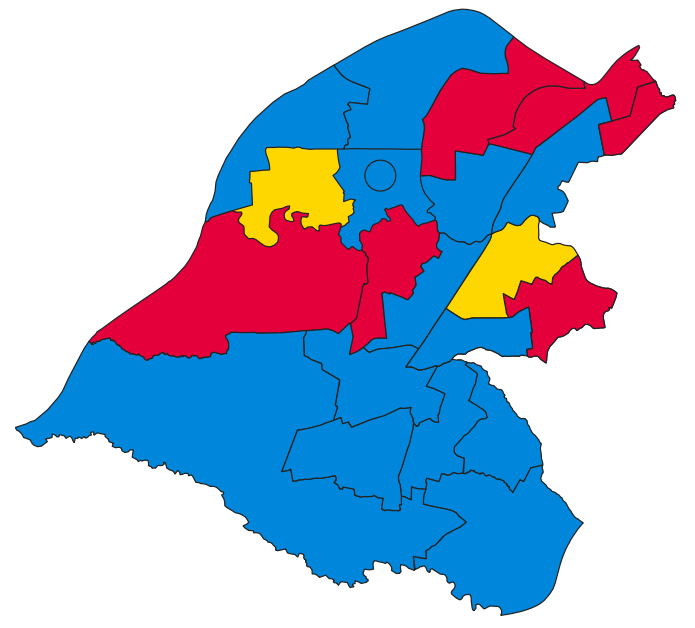
1983 results map

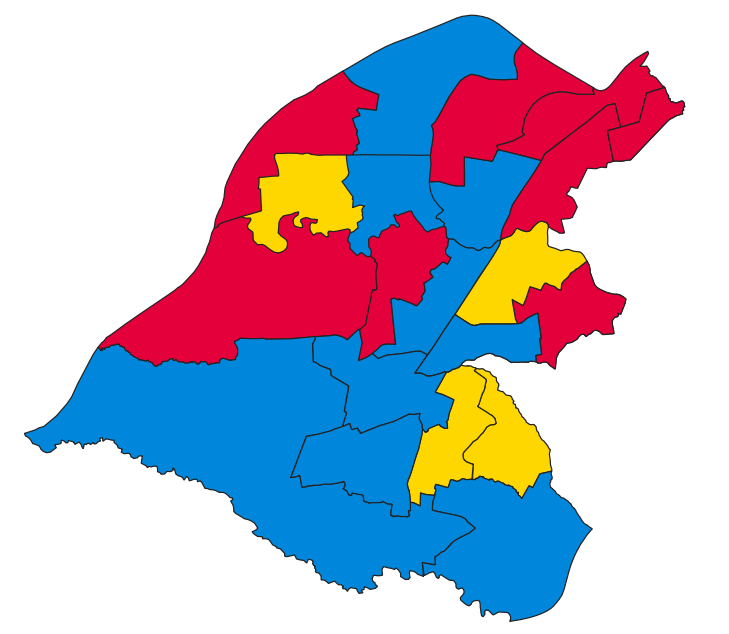
1984 results map

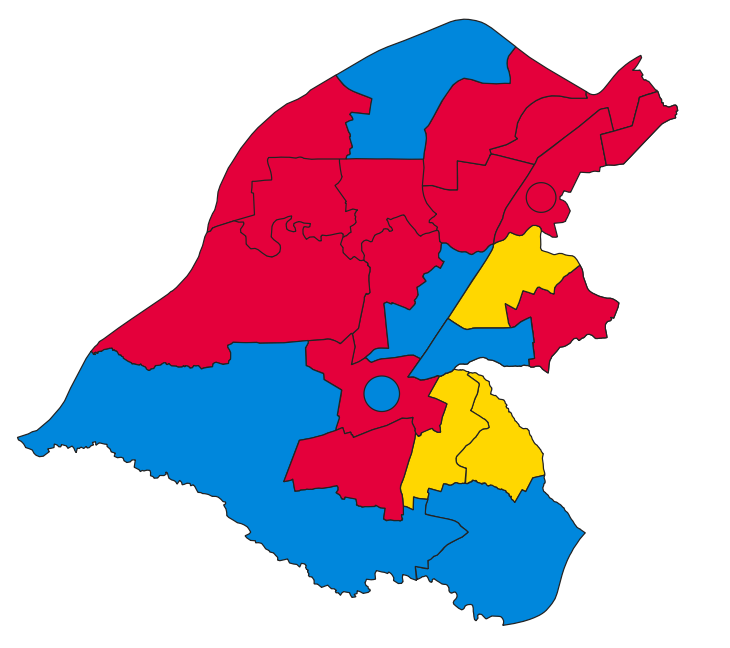
1986 results map

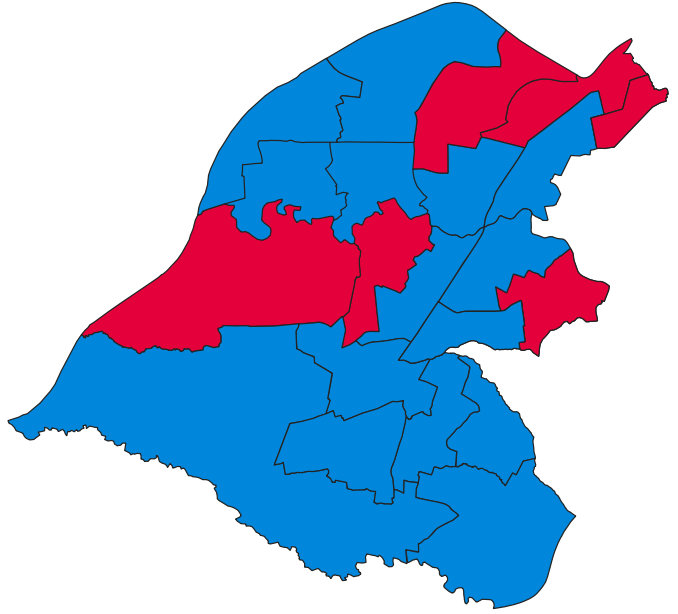
1987 results map

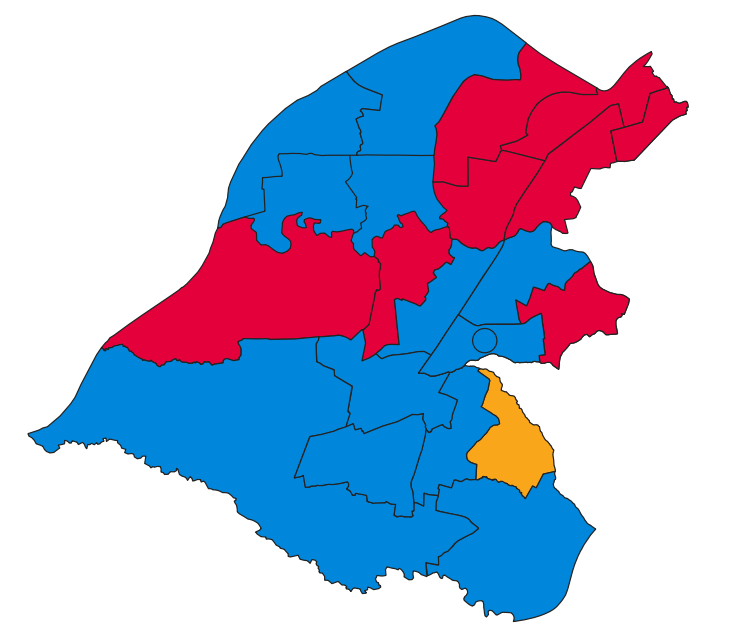
1988 results map

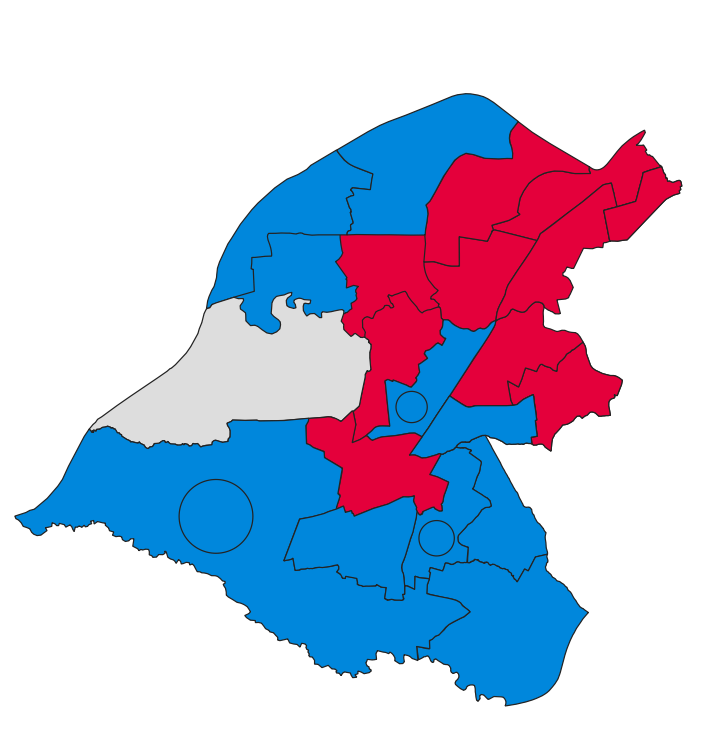
1990 results map

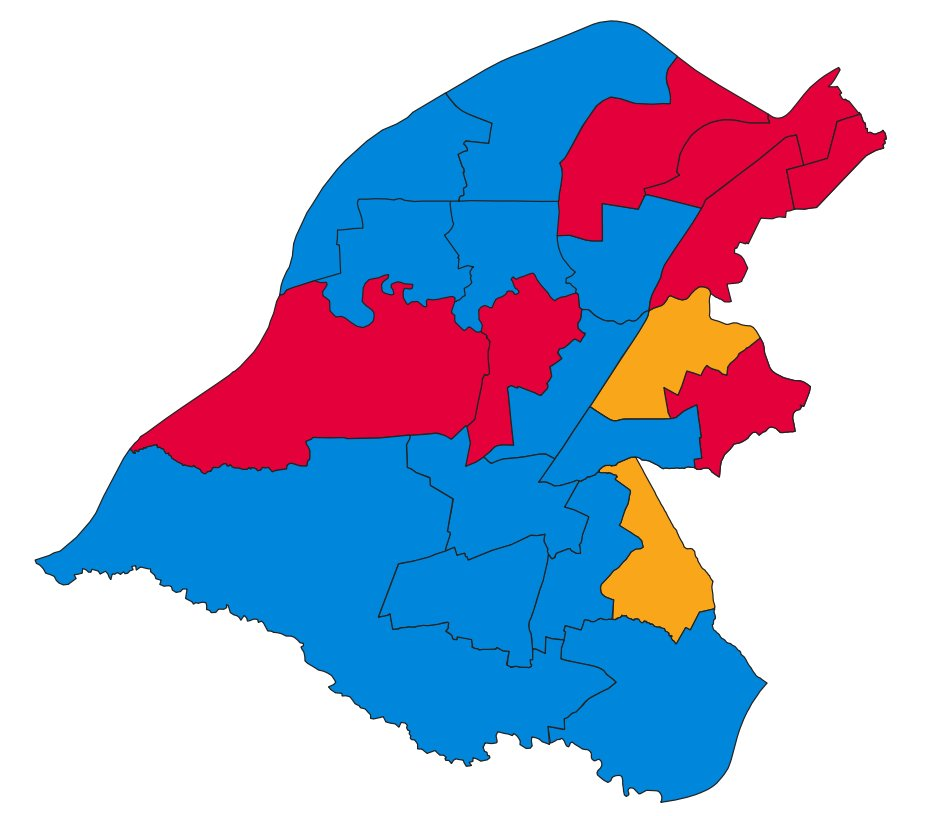
1991 results map

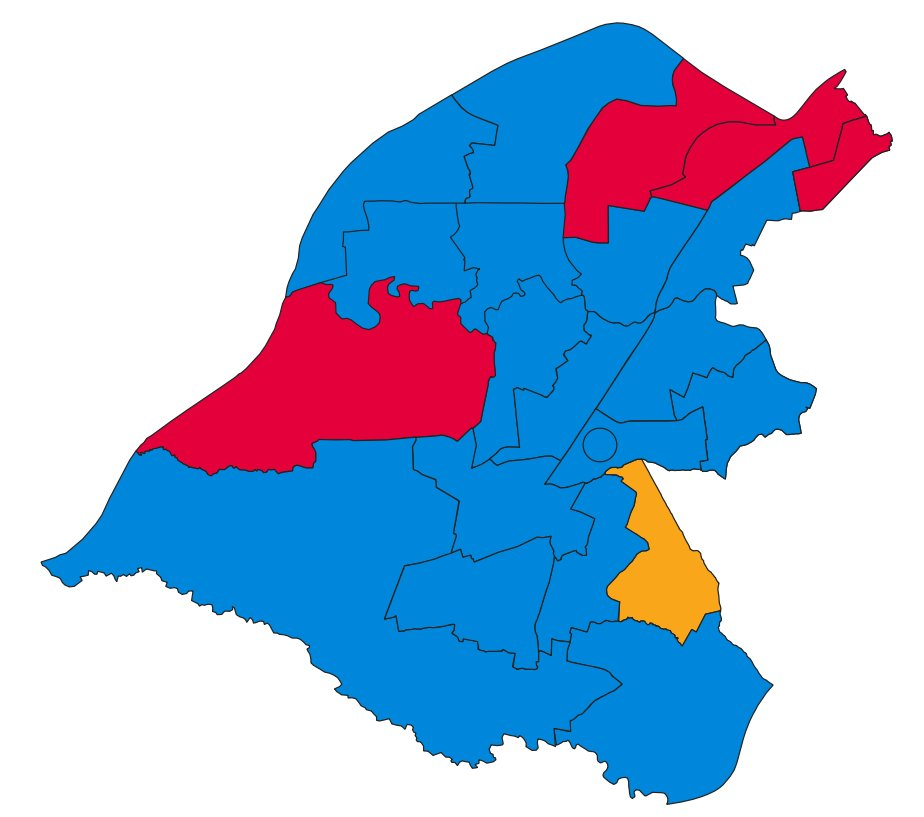
1992 results map

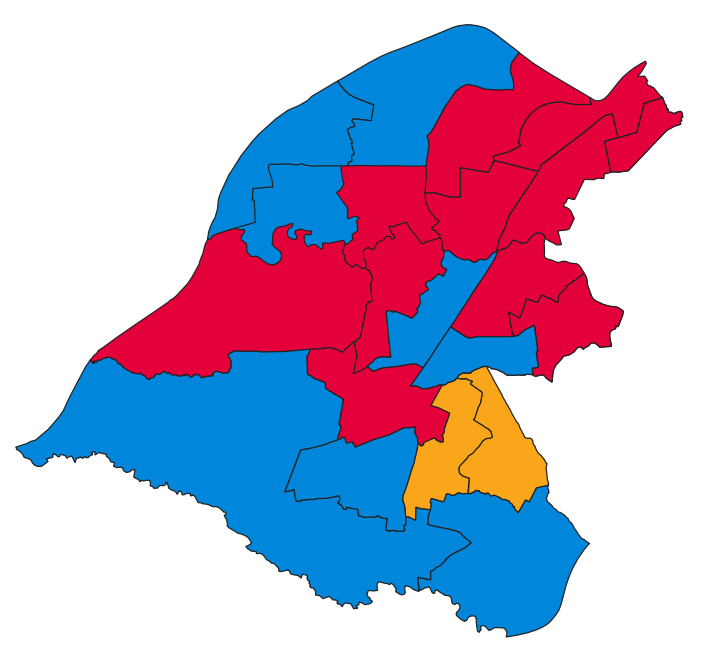
1994 results map

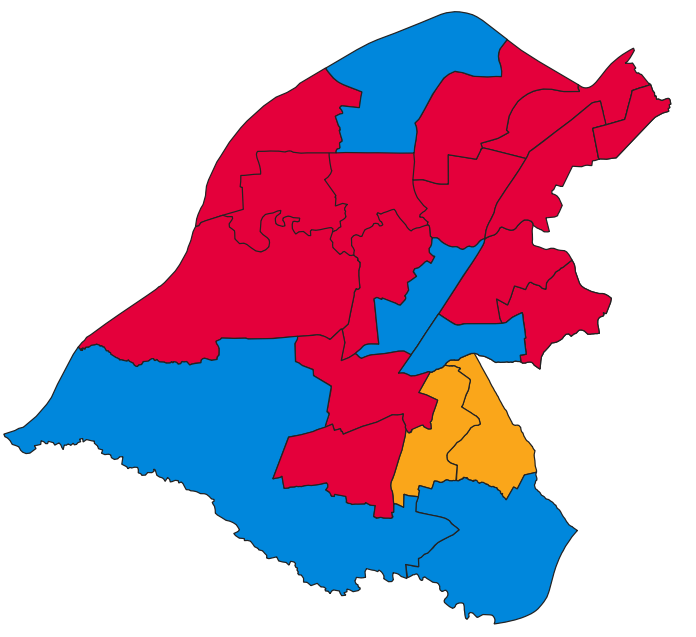
1995 results map

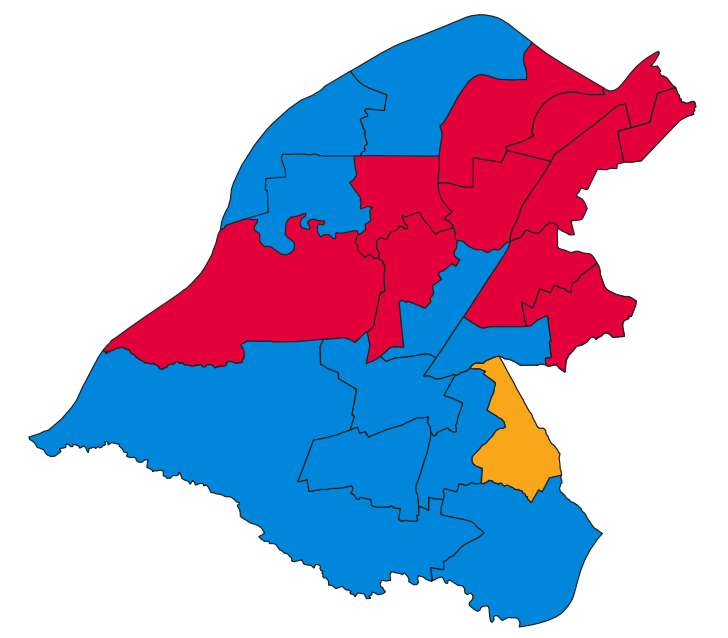
1996 results map

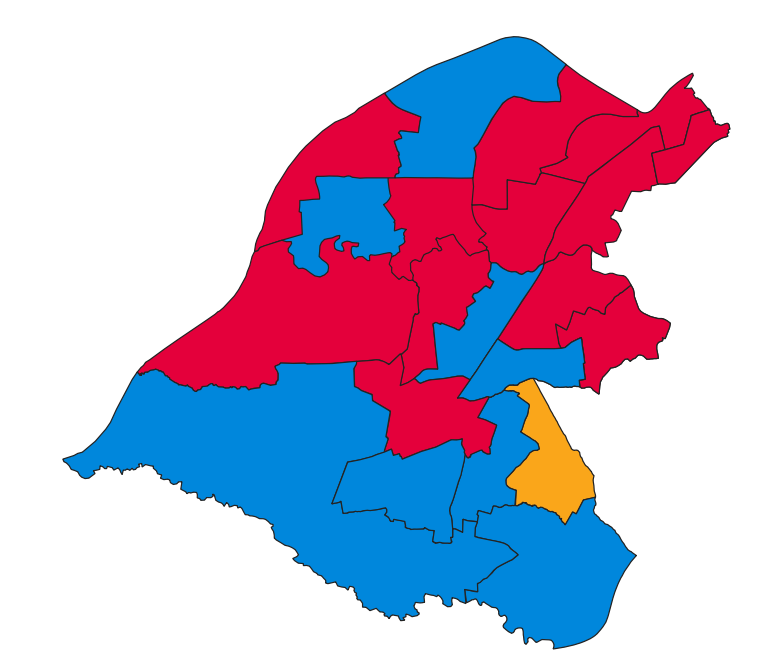
1998 results map

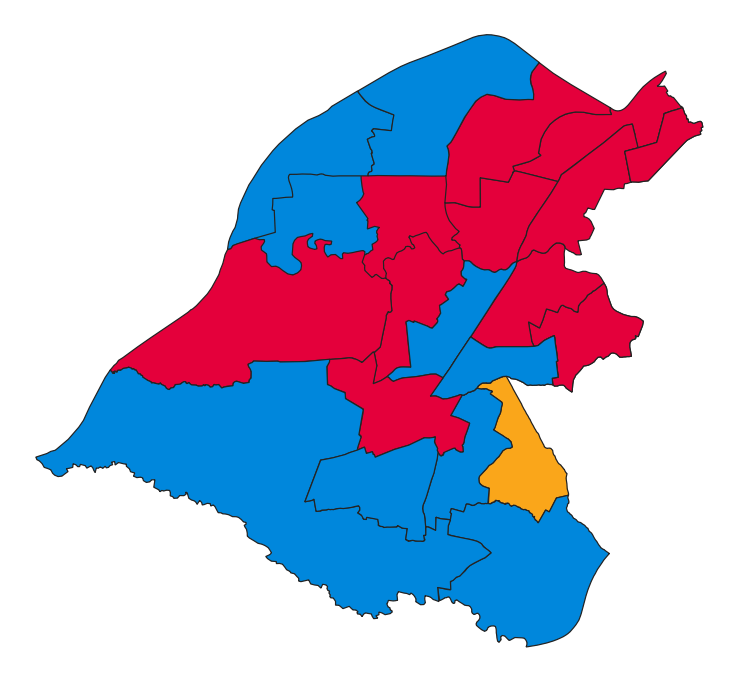
1999 results map

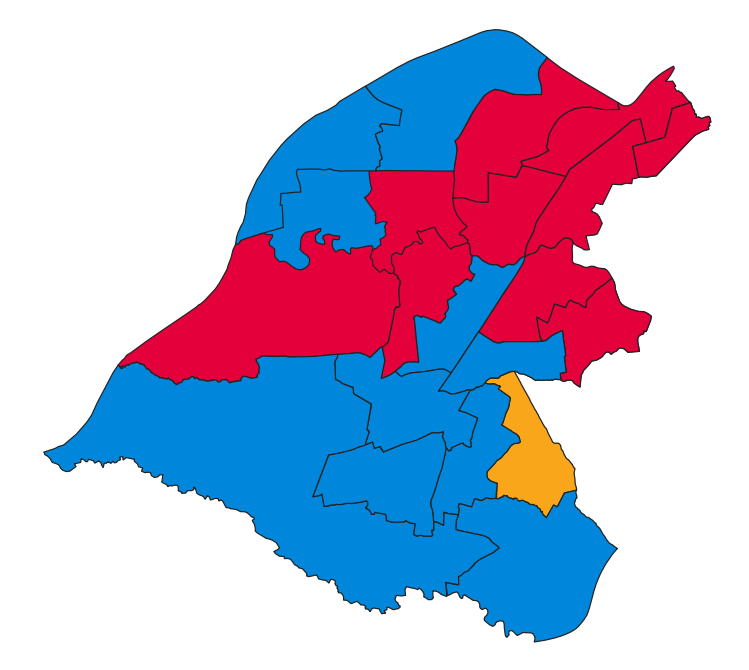
2000 results map

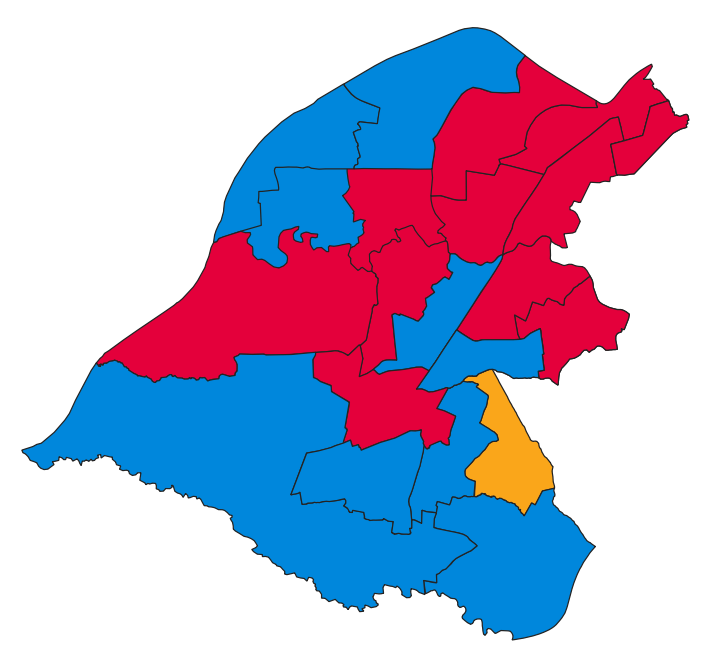
2002 results map

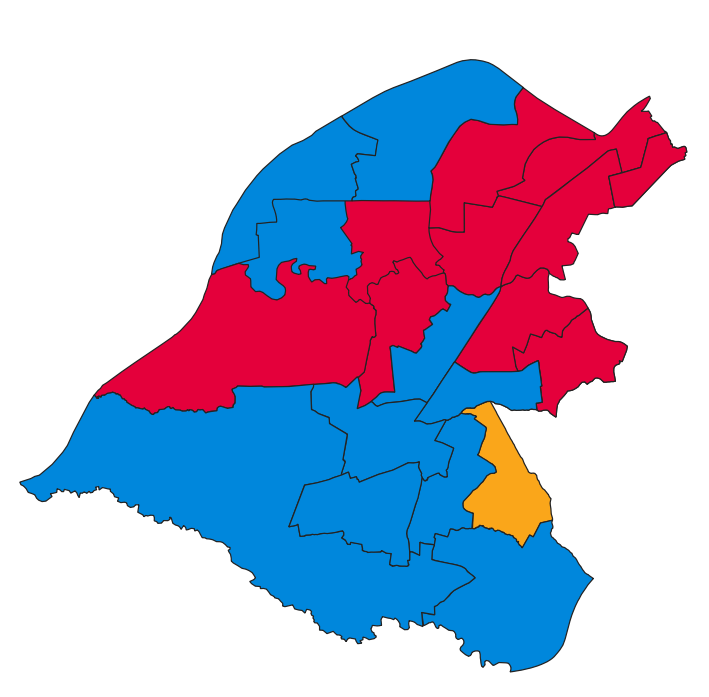
2003 results map

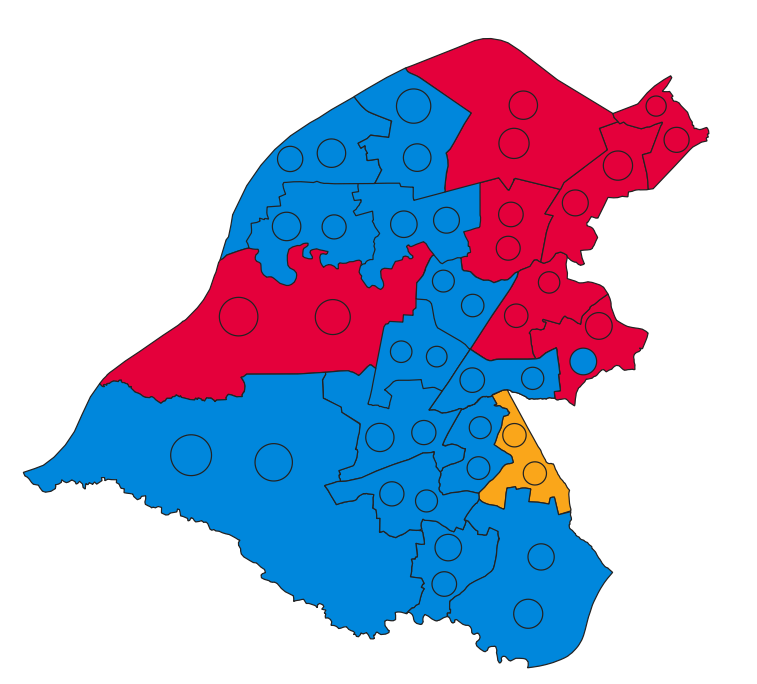
2004 results map

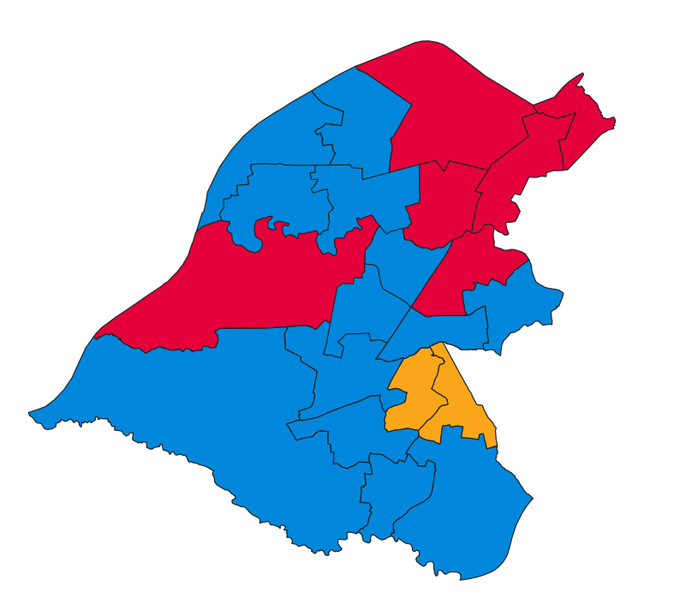
2006 results map

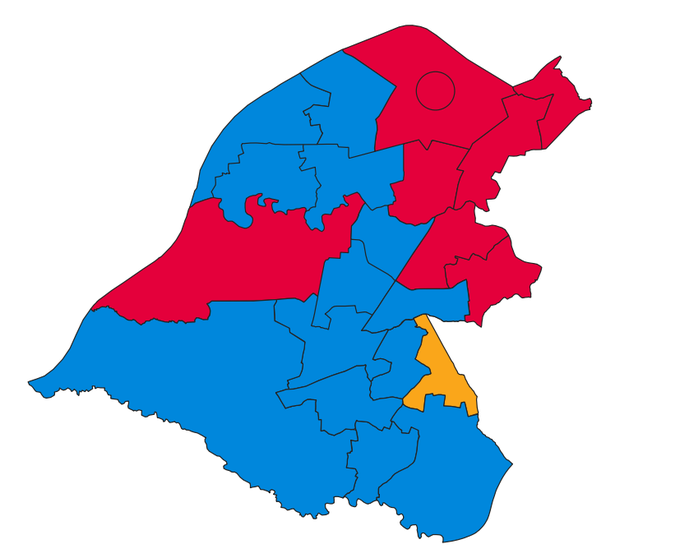
2007 results map

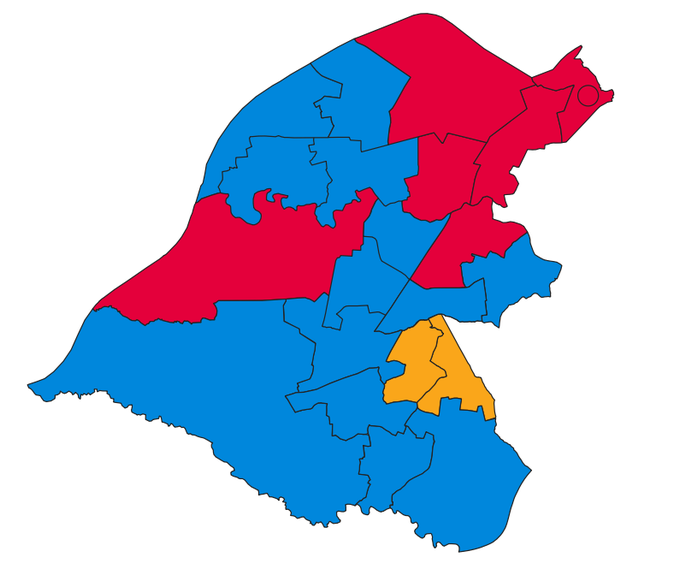
2008 results map

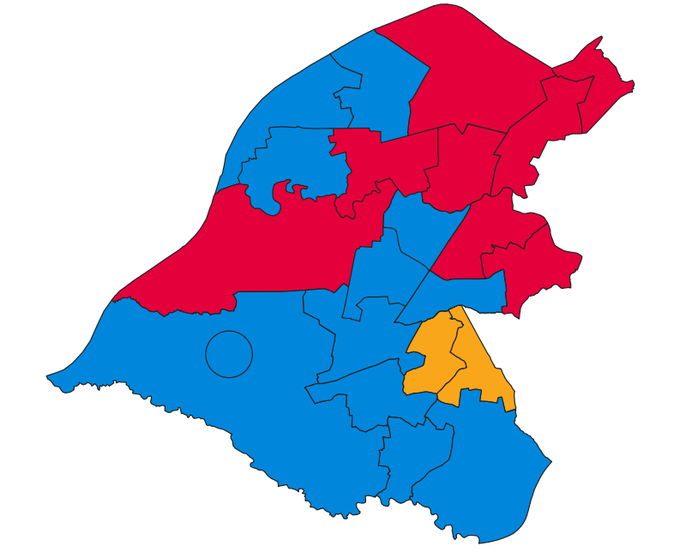
2010 results map

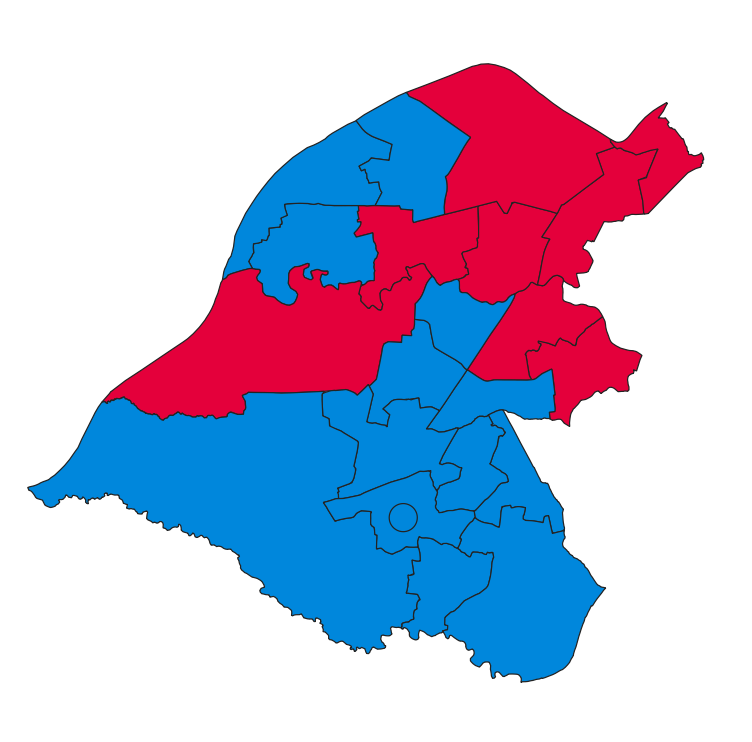
2011 results map

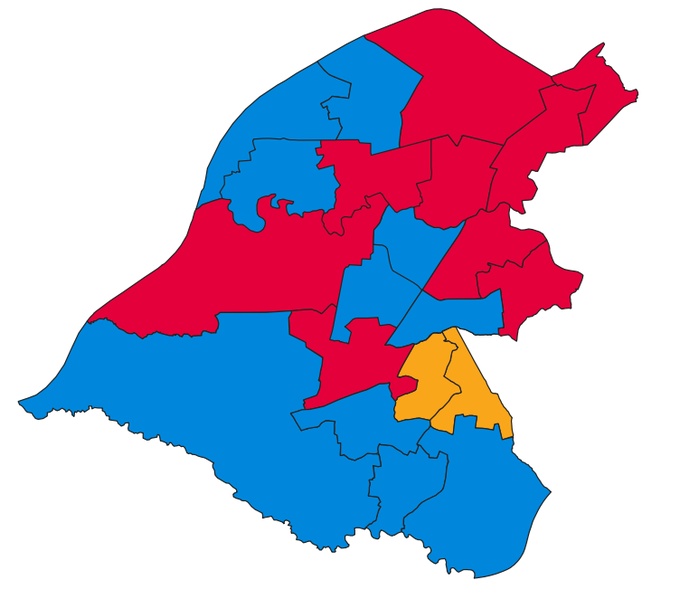
2012 results map

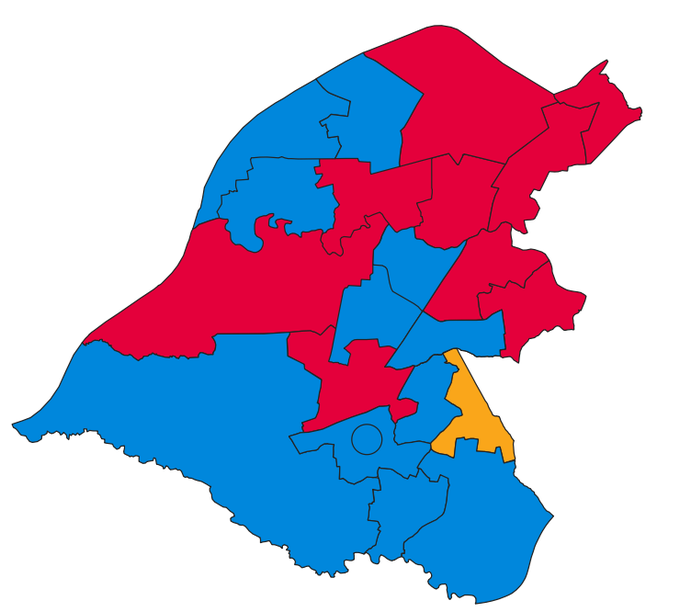
2014 results map

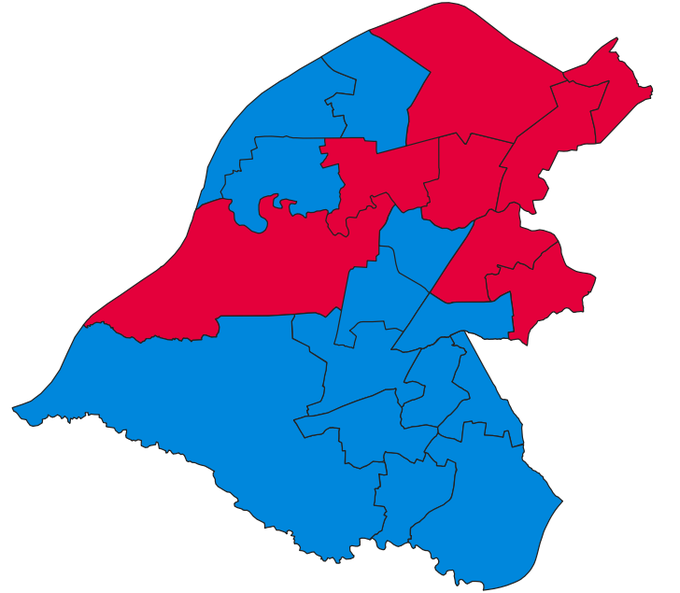
2015 results map

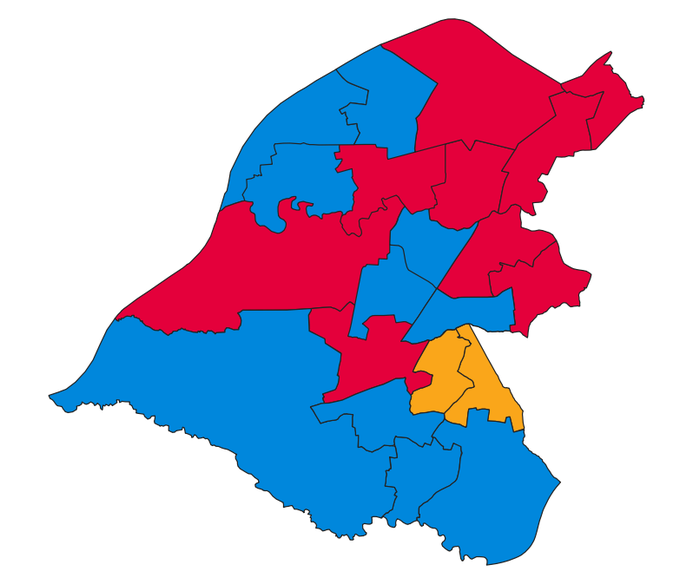
2016 results map

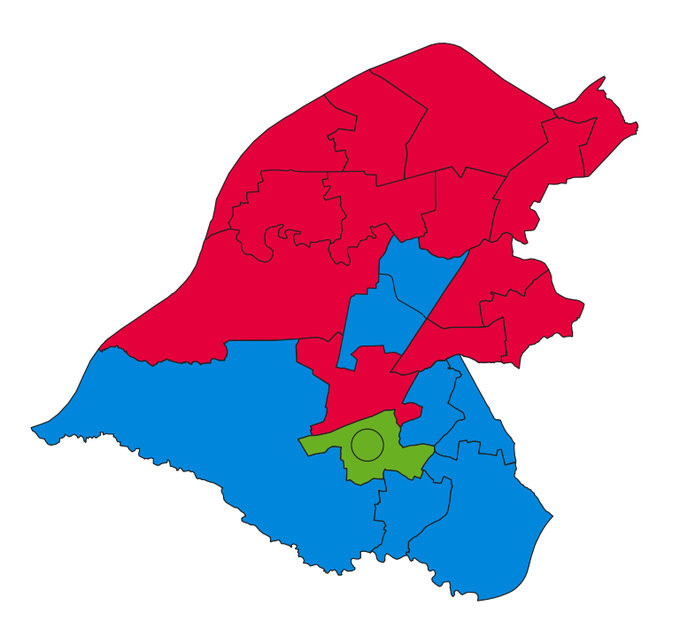
2018 results map

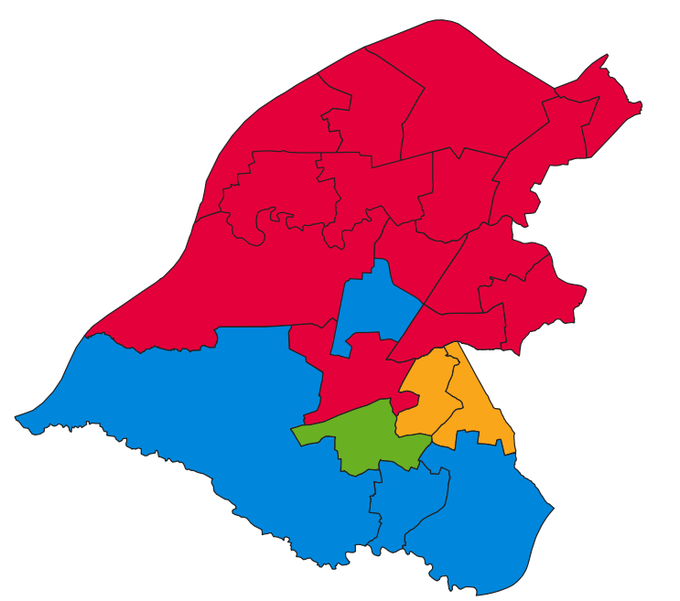
2019 results map

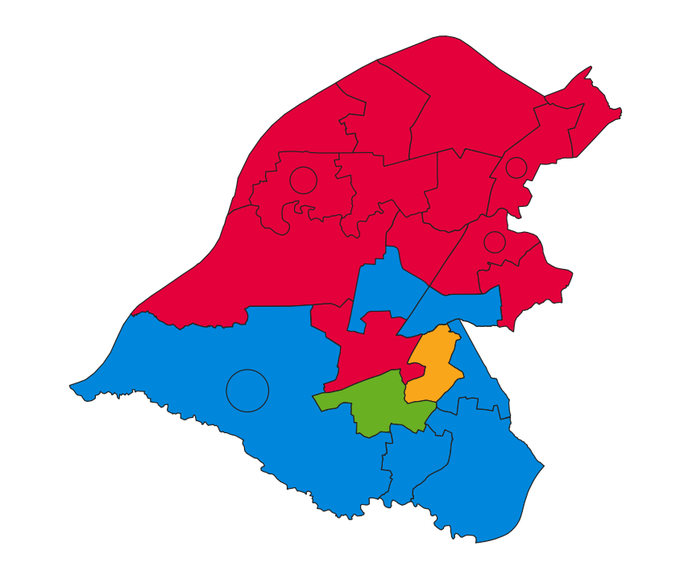
2021 results map

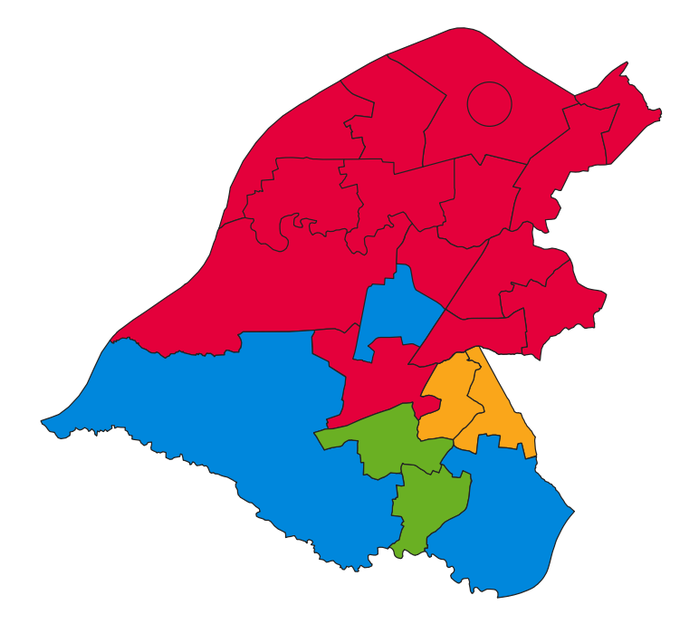
2022 results map

2023 results map

2024 results map

2026 results map

== By-election results ==
=== By-elections in the 2020s ===
Hale By-Election 20 November 2025
Party	Candidate	Votes	%	±%
Conservative	Natalie Shalom	1,521	46.5	▲10.0
Green	Orla Weir	1,245	38.1	▼9.2
Reform	Phil Holt	264	8.1	▲8.1
Labour	Clare Sheridan	138	4.2	▼7.6
Liberal Democrats	Jason Stack	101	3.1	▼0.5
Majority		276	8.4	
Turnout		3,269		
Conservative gain from Green		Swing		

Broadheath By-Election 16 October 2025
Party	Candidate	Votes	%	±%
Conservative	Kaushik Chakraborty	1,614	36.8	▼4.4
Labour	Mahvish Masood	978	22.3	▼19.0
Liberal Democrats	Louise Claire Bird	841	19.2	▲19.0
Reform	Deborah Rhodes	723	16.5	▲11.2
Green	Alexander Philip Young	204	4.7	▼1.9
Independent	Stephen John Farndon	22	0.5	▼0.8
Majority		636	49.6	
Registered electors		8,846		
Turnout		4,389	49.6	▲2.2
Conservative gain from Labour		Swing		

Bucklow-St. Martins By-Election 2 November 2023
Party	Candidate	Votes	%	±%
Labour	Frances Cosby	794	62.0	▼0.8
Conservative	Paul Lally	284	22.0	▲1.7
Reform	Paul Swansborough	82	6.4	N/A
Green	Rodrigo Capucho Paulo	80	6.2	▼4.2
Liberal Democrats	Matthew Sellars	36	2.8	▼3.5
Majority		510	39.8	
Registered electors		7,325		
Turnout		1,280	17.5	▼7.0
Labour hold		Swing		

=== By-elections in the 2010s ===
Bucklow-St. Martins By-Election 14 September 2017
Party	Candidate	Votes	%	±%
Labour	Aidan Williams	1,050	64.7	+26.3
Conservative	Sarah Marland	456	28.1	+11.0
UKIP	Andrew Beaumont	65	4.0	−9.3
Green	Joe Ryan	33	2.0	−2.5
Liberal Democrats	Simon Lepori	18	1.1	−1.8
Majority		594	35.7	+21.1
Turnout		1,662	22.0	−10.7
Labour gain from Conservative		Swing		

Broadheath By-Election 4 May 2017
Party	Candidate	Votes	%	±%
Labour	Amy Marie Whyte	2,086	46.0	−1.2
Conservative	Dave Morgan	1,778	40.9	−0.3
Liberal Democrats	Simon Alexander Latham	271	6.2	+1.1
UKIP	Mike Bayley-Sanderson	91	2.1	
Green	Joe Ryan	80	1.8	−2.0
Independent	Stephen John Farndon	36	0.8	−1.8
Majority		308	7.1	+1.2
Turnout		4342	44.3	+2.5
Labour hold		Swing		

Broadheath By-Election 16 January 2014
Party	Candidate	Votes	%	±%
Labour	Helen Boyle	1,377	44.5	−1.8
Conservative	Brenda Houraghan	1,258	40.6	+1.8
UKIP	Ron George	234	7.5	+1.3
Liberal Democrats	Will Jones	150	4.8	+0.4
Green	Joe Ryan	67	2.2	−2.1
Majority		119	3.8	−3.6
Turnout		3,097	30.3	−8.5
Labour gain from Conservative		Swing		

=== By-elections in the 2000s ===
Davyhulme West By-Election 25 November 2004
Party	Candidate	Votes	%	±%
Conservative	Nigel Hooley	1,070	52.2	−3.4
Labour	Bill Clarke	757	36.9	+8.1
Liberal Democrats	Alan Vernon	222	10.8	−4.8
Majority		313	15.3	−13.5
Turnout		2,049	27.2	−21.3
Conservative hold		Swing		

Timperley By-Election 25 November 2004
Party	Candidate	Votes	%	±%
Conservative	Ken Bullman	1,152	51.2	+1.8
Liberal Democrats	Ian Chappell	750	33.3	+2.5
Labour	Tom Ross	349	15.5	−4.5
Majority		402	17.9	−1.7
Turnout		2,251	27.3	−25.1
Conservative hold		Swing		

Davyhulme East By-Election 28 November 2002
Party	Candidate	Votes	%	±%
Conservative	M. D. Cornes	2,030	57.6	+0.2
Labour	N. K. Roberts	1,493	42.4	−0.2
Majority		537	15.2	+0.5
Turnout		3,523	50.0	−2.2
Conservative hold		Swing		

=== By-elections in the 1990s ===
Talbot By-Election 18 September 1997
Party	Candidate	Votes	%	±%
Labour	S. A. Beaumont	935	81.8	+5.5
Conservative	M. Ali	144	12.6	−9.6
Liberal Democrats	F. C. Beswick	64	5.6	+5.6
Majority		791	69.2	+15.1
Turnout		1,143	17.9	−10.1
Labour hold		Swing		

Clifford By-Election 16 December 1993
Party	Candidate	Votes	%	±%
Labour	E. W. Stennett	1,207	78.8	+16.7
Conservative	C. H. Davenport	226	14.8	−17.4
Liberal Democrats	F. C. Beswick	99	6.5	+6.5
Majority		981	64.0	+34.1
Turnout		1,532	17.9	
Labour hold		Swing		

Stretford By-Election 5 December 1991
Party	Candidate	Votes	%	±%
Labour	B. E. Garlick	1,656	48.0	+2.2
Conservative	H. Walker*	1,654	47.9	−2.0
Liberal Democrats	F. C. Beswick	140	4.1	−4.1
Majority		2	0.1	+34.1
Turnout		3,450	42.9	−6.6
Labour gain from Conservative		Swing		

=== By-elections in the 1980s ===
Bowdon By-Election 15 June 1989
Party	Candidate	Votes	%	±%
Conservative	M. C. Harney	2,582	59.6	−11.2
Labour	H. F. Busteed	674	15.6	+3.6
Liberal Democrats	G. P. Pawson	567	13.1	−0.5
Green	M. R. Rowtham	506	11.7	+8.2
Majority		1,908	44.1	+3
Turnout		4,329	47.3	+14.3
Conservative hold		Swing		

Urmston By-Election 24 November 1988
Party	Candidate	Votes	%	±%
Labour	D. Acton	1,563	52.6	+7.1
Conservative	J. G. Graham	1,406	47.4	+0.2
Majority		157	5.3	+3.7
Turnout		2,969	37.2	+14.3
Labour hold		Swing		

Mersey St. Marys By-Election 22 January 1987
Party	Candidate	Votes	%	±%
Conservative	S. G. Brownhill	1,610	56.7	+5.0
SDP	R. J. Thompson	683	24.0	+24.0
Labour	P. Miller	550	19.3	−0.2
Majority		927	32.6	+9.8
Turnout		2,843	29.6	−13.8
Conservative hold		Swing		

Talbot By-Election 6 November 1986
Party	Candidate	Votes	%	±%
Labour	P. A. Lane	1,209	68.3	+1.1
Conservative	C. J. Levenston	562	31.7	+9.0
Majority		647	36.5	−8.0
Turnout		1,771	24.3	−11.9
Labour hold		Swing		

Altrincham By-Election 6 March 1986
Party	Candidate	Votes	%	±%
Labour	J. F. L. Wood	1,150	38.2	−0.6
Conservative	S. M. A. O'Beirne	983	32.7	−10.9
SDP	B. M. Keeley-Huggett	793	26.4	+26.4
Green	N. J. Eadie	81	2.7	+1.1
Majority		167	5.6	+0.8
Turnout		3,007	37.4	−11.9
Labour gain from Conservative		Swing		

Urmston By-Election 6 March 1986
Party	Candidate	Votes	%	±%
Labour	D. Acton	1,321	44.7	+5.4
Conservative	E. May	871	29.5	−14.5
SDP	P. J. Carlon	762	25.8	+9.1
Majority		450	15.2	+10.6
Turnout		2,954	37.1	−6.9
Labour gain from Conservative		Swing		

Flixton By-Election 23 May 1985
Party	Candidate	Votes	%	±%
Liberal	J. E. Parry	1,608	40.5	+2.1
Conservative	A. M. Durbin	1,213	30.6	−6.9
Labour	M. J. Goggins	1,146	28.9	+4.8
Majority		395	10.0	+9.1
Turnout		3,967	49.4	+2.2
Liberal hold		Swing		

Timperley By-Election 8 July 1982
Party	Candidate	Votes	%	±%
Conservative	W. J. Watkins	1,433	47.3	−1.7
Liberal	G. K. Stuart	1,388	45.8	−2.6
Labour	R. J. Short	208	6.9	+4.3
Majority		45	1.5	+1.4
Turnout		3,029	33.8	−11.6
Conservative hold		Swing		

Village By-Election 18 March 1982
Party	Candidate	Votes	%	±%
Liberal	R. B. Slack	1,338	38.6	+2.1
Conservative	D. Merrell	1,138	32.9	−0.9
Labour	R. Crewe	988	28.5	−1.2
Majority		200	5.8	+3.0
Turnout		3,464	41.2	−9.0
Liberal gain from Conservative		Swing		

Flixton By-Election 9 July 1981
Party	Candidate	Votes	%	±%
Liberal	D. E. Earl	1,400	40.1	+9.2
Conservative	P. Schofield	1,199	34.3	−2.3
Labour	R. A. Tully	895	25.6	−6.9
Majority		201	5.8	−1.7
Turnout		3,494	44.4	−4.4
Liberal gain from Conservative		Swing		

Davyhulme West By-Election 11 June 1981
Party	Candidate	Votes	%	±%
Labour	L. M. Seex	1,417	43.3	+4.6
Conservative	D. P. Harding	1,242	37.9	+1.0
Liberal	J. A. Cottrell	617	18.8	−4.7
Majority		175	5.3	+4.4
Turnout		3,276	39.7	−4.8
Labour gain from Liberal		Swing		

=== By-elections in the 1970s ===
Davyhulme West By-Election 13 December 1979
Party	Candidate	Votes	%	±%
Conservative	D. P. Harding	858	41.3	+41.3
Labour	A. Stringer	752	36.2	+3.1
Liberal	L. O'Rourke	466	22.4	−38.3
Majority		106	5.1	−16.3
Turnout		2,076	20.0	−55.0
Conservative hold		Swing		

Longford By-Election 30 August 1979
Party	Candidate	Votes	%	±%
Labour	M. E. Cottam	1,187	42.7	+1.6
Conservative	J. A. Schofield	1,127	40.5	−4.0
Liberal	H. D. Locksley	466	16.8	+2.4
Majority		60	2.2	−1.2
Turnout		2,780	29.1	−43.6
Labour gain from Conservative		Swing		

Broadheath By-Election 24 March 1977
Party	Candidate	Votes	%	±%
Conservative	M. G. Currie	1,183	56.7	+2.4
Liberal	E. H. Faulkner	579	27.7	−3.4
Labour	P. B. Ayo	325	15.6	−5.8
Majority		604	28.9	−1.2
Turnout		2,087	31.7	−13.3
Conservative hold		Swing		

St. Martins By-Election 24 March 1977
Party	Candidate	Votes	%	±%
Conservative	T. Almond	1,862	58.7	−8.1
Labour	B. Brotherton	744	23.5	−9.7
Liberal	W. J. Golding	566	17.8	+17.8
Majority		1,118	35.2	+1.5
Turnout		3,172	28.1	−10.1
Conservative hold		Swing		

Village By-Election 14 October 1976
Party	Candidate	Votes	%	±%
Conservative	R. Holden	1,307	67.1	+19.5
Labour	J. Gregory	640	32.9	+8.1
Majority		667	34.3	+11.5
Turnout		1,947	24.3	−20.2
Conservative gain from Labour		Swing		

St. Martins By-Election 18 July 1974
Party	Candidate	Votes	%	±%
Conservative	P. A. G. Morgan Evans	1,752	46.2	−13.8
Labour	T. J. Packham	1,191	31.4	
Liberal	M. Wood	849	22.4	
Majority		561	14.8	
Turnout		3,792	34.0	
Conservative gain from Labour		Swing		
