= Broadheath (Trafford ward) =

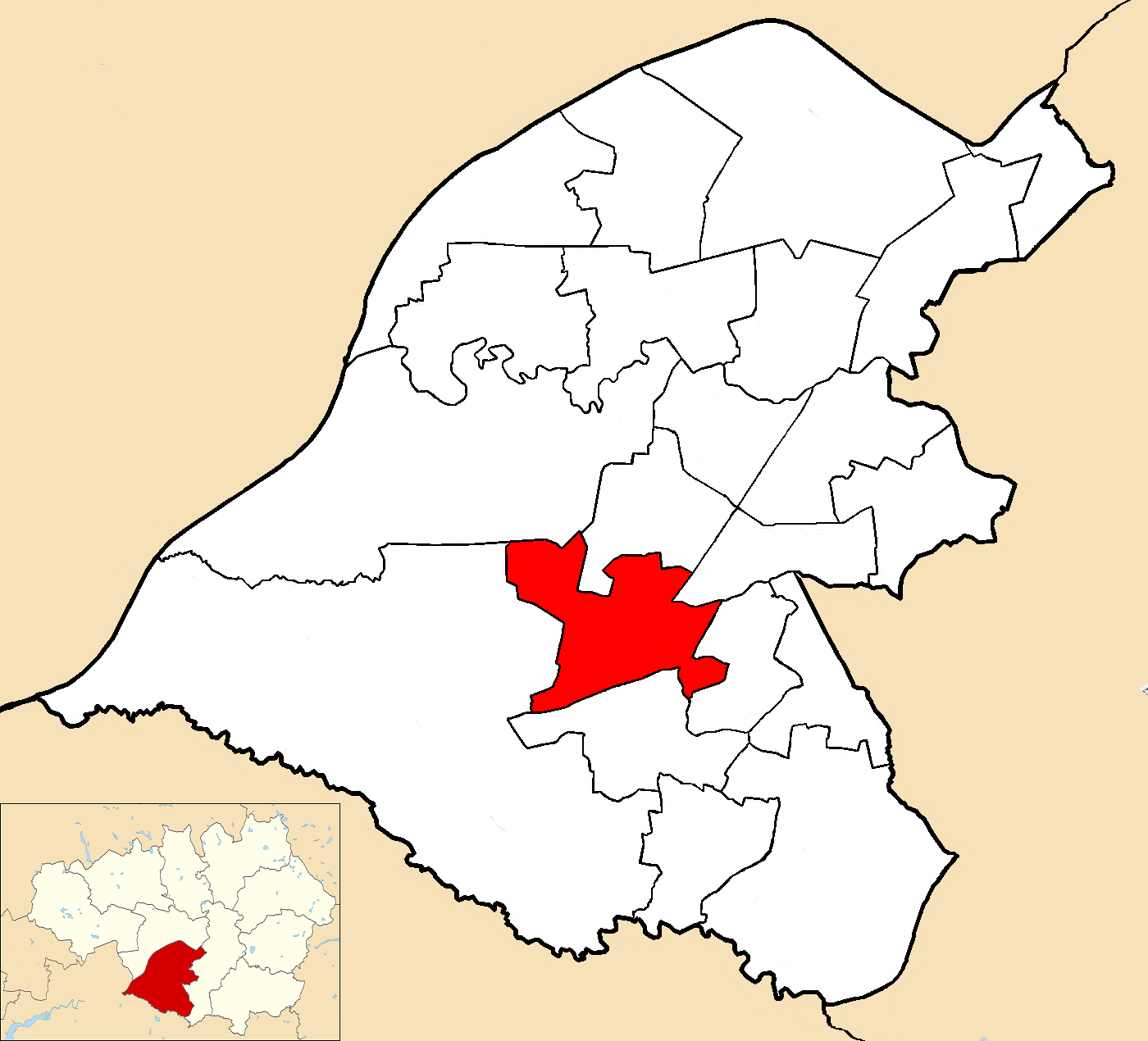
- Broadheath within Trafford
- Population: 13,069
- Metropolitan borough: Trafford
- Metropolitan county: Greater Manchester
- Country: England
- Sovereign state: United Kingdom
- UK Parliament: Altrincham and Sale West
- Councillors: Amy Whyte (Labour); Ulrich Savary (Liberal Democrat); Kaushik Chakraborty (Conservative)

Broadheath is an electoral ward of Trafford, Greater Manchester, England, covering the Broadheath area of Altrincham, part of Timperley, and a small part of Sale.

== Councillors ==
As of 2022, the councillors are Amy Whyte (Labour), Serena Carr (Labour), and Denise Western (Labour).

Election	Councillor	Councillor	Councillor
1973	F. Metcalf (Con)	D. Stroud (Con)	O. Wilson (Con)
1975	F. Metcalf (Con)	D. Stroud (Con)	C. Harrison (Con)
1976	F. Metcalf (Con)	Richard Finch (Con)	C. Harrison (Con)
Mar 1977	M. Currie (Con)	Richard Finch (Con)	C. Harrison (Con)
1978	M. Currie (Con)	Richard Finch (Con)	Lydia Burton (Con)
1979	M. Currie (Con)	Richard Finch (Con)	Lydia Burton (Con)
1980	M. Currie (Con)	Paul Dolan (Lab)	Lydia Burton (Con)
1982	M. Currie (Con)	Paul Dolan (Lab)	Lydia Burton (Con)
1983	M. Currie (Con)	Paul Dolan (Lab)	Lydia Burton (Con)
1984	M. Currie (Con)	H. Lawton (Con)	Lydia Burton (Con)
1986	John Hyland (Lab)	Michael Barltrop (Con)	Lydia Burton (Con)
1987	John Hyland (Lab)	Michael Barltrop (Con)	Lydia Burton (Con)
1988	John Hyland (Lab)	Michael Barltrop (Con)	Lydia Burton (Con)
1990	Jane Baugh (Lab)	Michael Barltrop (Con)	Lydia Burton (Con)
1991	Jane Baugh (Lab)	Michael Barltrop (Con)	Lydia Burton (Con)
1992	Jane Baugh (Lab)	Kathy Bullock (Con)	Lydia Burton (Con)
1994	Jane Baugh (Lab)	Kathy Bullock (Con)	Lydia Burton (Con)
1995	Jane Baugh (Lab)	Kathy Bullock (Con)	Julia Chapman-Barker (Lab)
1996	Jane Baugh (Lab)	Kathy Bullock (Con)	Julia Chapman-Barker (Lab)
1998	Jane Baugh (Lab)	Kathy Bullock (Con)	Julia Chapman-Barker (Lab)
1999	Jane Baugh (Lab)	Kathy Bullock (Con)	Julia Chapman-Barker (Lab)
2000	Jane Baugh (Lab)	Ken Weston (Con)	Julia Chapman-Barker (Lab)
2002	Jane Baugh (Lab)	Ken Weston (Con)	Julia Chapman-Barker (Lab)
2003	Jane Baugh (Con)	Ken Weston (Con)	Brenda Houghraghan (Con)
2004	Brenda Houraghan (Con)	Ken Weston (Con)	James Pearson (Con)
2006	Brenda Houraghan (Con)	Ken Weston (Con)	James Pearson (Con)
2007	Brenda Houraghan (Con)	Ken Weston (Con)	James Pearson (Con)
2008	Brenda Houraghan (Con)	Ken Weston (Con)	James Pearson (Con)
2010	Brenda Houraghan (Con)	Ken Weston (Con)	Jacki Wilkinson (Con)
2011	Brenda Houraghan (Con)	Ken Weston (Con)	Jacki Wilkinson (Con)
2012	Denise Western (Lab)	Ken Weston (Con)	Jacki Wilkinson (Con)
Jan 2014	Denise Western (Lab)	Helen Boyle (Lab)	Jacki Wilkinson (Con)
May 2014	Denise Western (Lab)	Helen Boyle (Lab)	Louise Dagnall (Lab)
2015	Denise Western (Lab)	Stephen Anstee (Con)	Louise Dagnall (Lab)
2016	Denise Western (Lab)	Stephen Anstee (Con)	Louise Dagnall (Lab)
2017	Denise Western (Lab)	Stephen Anstee (Con)	Amy Whyte (Lab)
2018	Denise Western (Lab)	Stephen Anstee (Con)	Amy Whyte (Lab)
2019	Denise Western (Lab)	Serena Carr (Lab)	Amy Whyte (Lab)
2021	Denise Western (Lab)	Serena Carr (Lab)	Amy Whyte (Lab)
2022	Denise Western (Lab)	Serena Carr (Lab)	Amy Whyte (Lab)
2023	Denise Western (Lab)	Amy Whyte (Lab)	Kaushik Chakraborty (Con)
2024	Denise Western (Lab)	Amy Whyte (Lab)	Ulrich Savary (Lab)
August 2025	Vacant	Amy Whyte (Lab)	Ulrich Savary (Ind)
September 2025	Kaushik Chakraborty (Con)	Amy Whyte (Lab)	Ulrich Savary (Lib Dem)
2026	Kaushik Chakraborty (Con)	Prakash Nathani (Con)	Ulrich Savary (Lib Dem)

indicates seat up for re-election. indicates by-election.

== Elections in the 2020s ==
=== October 2025 (by-election) ===
By-election 16 October 2025
Party	Candidate	Votes	%	±%
Conservative	Kaushik Chakraborty	1,614	36.8	−4.2
Labour	Mahvish Masood	978	22.3	−18.8
Liberal Democrats	Louise Bird	841	19.2	+14.9
Reform	Deborah Rhodes	723	16.5	+11.2
Green	Alexander Young	204	4.6	+0.3
Independent	Stephen Farndon	22	0.5	−0.8
Majority		636	14.5	
Rejected ballots		7	0.2	-0.2
Turnout		4,389	49.6	
Registered electors		8,846		
Conservative gain from Labour		Swing	+7.3	

=== May 2024 ===
2024
Party	Candidate	Votes	%	±%
Labour	Ulrich Savary	1,716	41.1	−2.1
Conservative	Kaushik Chakraborty*	1,710	41.0	+0.6
Green	Alexander Young	271	6.5	−3.1
Reform	Andrew Brougham-Holland	219	5.3	N/A
Liberal Democrats	Christopher Marritt	179	4.3	−2.5
Independent	Stephen Farndon	56	1.3	−3.6
Majority		6	0.1	
Rejected ballots		17	0.4	-0.4
Turnout		4,168	47.4	+2.7
Registered electors		8,787		
Labour gain from Conservative		Swing	-1.4	

=== May 2023 ===
2023 (3)
Party	Candidate	Votes	%	±%
Labour	Denise Western*	1,695	43.2%	
Labour	Amy Whyte*	1,674	42.7%	
Conservative	Kaushik Chakraborty	1,585	40.4%	
Labour	Ulrich Savary	1,566	39.9%	
Conservative	Prakash Nathani	1,294	33.0%	
Conservative	Russell Scharosch	1,207	30.8%	
Green	Francesca Chandler	375	9.6%	
Green	Marian Dodds	272	6.9%	
Liberal Democrats	Christopher Marritt	268	6.8%	
Green	Alexander Young	268	6.8%	
Liberal Democrats	Louise Bird	252	6.4%	
Independent	John Farndon	192	4.9%	
Liberal Democrats	James Miller	162	4.1%	
Britain First	Donald Southworth	153	3.9%	
Majority				
Rejected ballots		33	0.8%	
Turnout		3,921	44.7%	
Registered electors		8,771		

=== May 2022 ===
2022
Party	Candidate	Votes	%	±%
Labour	Amy Whyte*	1,894	44.9	
Conservative	Kaushik Chakraborty	1,649	39.1	
Liberal Democrats	Christopher Marritt	265	6.3	
Green	Alexander Young	263	6.2	
Independent	Stephen Farndon	140	3.3	
Majority		245	5.8	
Registered electors		10,073		
Turnout		4220	41.9	
Labour hold		Swing		

=== May 2021 ===
2021
Party	Candidate	Votes	%	±%
Labour	Denise Western*	2,260	48.6	▲1.6
Conservative	Kaushik Chakraborty	1,708	36.8	▼4.2
Green	Alexander Young	319	6.9	▲3.1
Liberal Democrats	Christopher Marritt	216	4.6	▼0.5
Independent	Stephen Farndon	120	2.6	0.0
Majority		552	11.9	▲6.0
Rejected ballots		22		
Registered electors		10,149		
Turnout		4,646	45.8	▲4.0
Labour hold		Swing	▲2.9	

== Elections in the 2010s ==
=== May 2019 ===
2019
Party	Candidate	Votes	%	±%
Labour	Serena Carr	1,904	47.3	▼2.0
Conservative	Shengke Zhi	1,219	30.3	▼10.4
Green	Daniel Gresty	346	8.6	▲4.8
UKIP	Norine Napier	255	6.3	▲5.0
Liberal Democrats	Christopher Marritt	219	5.4	▲1.4
Independent	Stephen Farndon	87	2.1	▲1.3
Majority		685	16.9	▲8.3
Registered electors		9,960		
Turnout		4,030	40.64	▼2
Labour gain from Conservative		Swing		

=== May 2018 ===
2018
Party	Candidate	Votes	%	±%
Labour	Amy Whyte*	2,077	49.3	+3.3
Conservative	Kate Burke	1,716	40.7	−0.2
Liberal Democrats	Chris Marriott	170	4.0	−2.2
Green	Daniel Gresty	160	3.8	+2.0
UKIP	Mike Bayley-Sanderson	56	1.3	−0.8
Independent	Stephen Farndon	33	0.8	0
Majority		361	8.6	+1.5
Turnout		4,212	42.6	−1.7
Labour hold		Swing		

=== May 2017 (by-election) ===
By-election 4 May 2017
Party	Candidate	Votes	%	±%
Labour	Amy Marie Whyte	2,086	46.0	−1.2
Conservative	Dave Morgan	1,778	40.9	−0.3
Liberal Democrats	Simon Alexander Latham	271	6.2	+1.1
UKIP	Mike Bayley-Sanderson	91	2.1	+2.1
Green	Joe Ryan	80	1.8	−2.0
Independent	Stephen John Farndon	36	0.8	−1.8
Majority		308	7.1	+1.2
Turnout		4342	44.3	+2.5

=== May 2016 ===
2016
Party	Candidate	Votes	%	±%
Labour	Denise Western*	1,877	47.0	+7.4
Conservative	Neil Ferguson	1,641	41.0	−7.8
Liberal Democrats	Pauline Cliff	204	5.1	−2.2
Green	Owain Sutton	152	3.8	0
Independent	Stephen Farndon	105	2.6	+2.6
Majority		236	5.9	−2.3
Turnout		3,995	41.8	−27.2
Labour hold		Swing		

=== May 2015 ===
2015
Party	Candidate	Votes	%	±%
Conservative	Stephen Anstee	3,274	49.0	+11.6
Labour	Aidan Williams	2,659	39.8	−3.6
Liberal Democrats	Pauline Cliff	489	7.3	+3.3
Green	David Eatock	254	3.8	−1.1
Majority		615	8.2	+5.4
Turnout		6,676	69.0	+23.1
Conservative gain from Labour		Swing		

=== May 2014 ===
2014
Party	Candidate	Votes	%	±%
Labour	Louise Dagnall	1,660	43.4	−2.9
Conservative	Jacki Wilkinson*	1,431	37.4	−1.5
UKIP	Ron George	413	10.8	+4.6
Green	Sara Ahsan	191	4.9	+0.6
Liberal Democrats	William Jones	129	3.3	−0.9
Majority		229	5.9	−1.5
Turnout		3,824	41.4	+2.6
Labour gain from Conservative		Swing		

=== January 2014 (by-election) ===
By-election 16 January 2014
Party	Candidate	Votes	%	±%
Labour	Helen Boyle	1,377	44.5	−1.8
Conservative	Brenda Houraghan	1,258	40.6	+1.8
UKIP	Ron George	234	7.5	+1.3
Liberal Democrats	Will Jones	150	4.8	+0.4
Green	Joe Ryan	67	2.2	−2.1
Majority		119	3.8	−3.6
Turnout		3,097	30.3	−8.5
Labour gain from Conservative		Swing		

=== May 2012 ===
2012
Party	Candidate	Votes	%	±%
Labour	Denise Western	1,662	46.3	+5.9
Conservative	Brenda Houraghan*	1,397	38.9	−4.3
UKIP	John Walsh	221	6.2	+1.5
Green	Sara Ahsan	156	4.3	−0.3
Liberal Democrats	Pauline Cliff	152	4.2	−2.9
Majority		265	7.4	+4.6
Turnout		3,588	38.8	−7.1
Labour gain from Conservative		Swing		

=== May 2011 ===
2011
Party	Candidate	Votes	%	±%
Conservative	Ken Weston*	1,879	43.2	+1.3
Labour	Andrew Leask	1,757	40.4	+11.1
Liberal Democrats	Sandra Taylor	307	7.1	−17.7
UKIP	John Walsh	205	4.7	+4.7
Green	Sara Ahsan	202	4.6	+0.6
Majority		122	2.8	−9.8
Turnout		4,350	45.9	−20.3
Conservative hold		Swing		

=== May 2010 ===
2010
Party	Candidate	Votes	%	±%
Conservative	Jacki Wilkinson	2,569	41.9	−12.2
Labour	Andrew Western	1,799	29.3	+2.4
Liberal Democrats	Richard Wilson	1,519	24.8	+14.0
Green	Christine McLaughlin	247	4.0	−4.2
Majority		770	12.6	−14.6
Turnout		6,134	66.2	+30.7
Conservative hold		Swing		

== Elections in the 2000s ==
=== May 2008 ===
2008
Party	Candidate	Votes	%	±%
Conservative	Brenda Houraghan*	1,681	54.1	+2.9
Labour	Andrew Western	836	26.9	−1.0
Liberal Democrats	Armaan Chohan	334	10.8	−2.5
Green	Martin Bate	255	8.2	−0.6
Majority		845	27.2	+3.9
Turnout		3,106	35.5	−0.9
Conservative hold		Swing		

=== May 2007 ===
2007
Party	Candidate	Votes	%	±%
Conservative	Ken Weston*	1,530	51.2	+1.6
Labour	Peter Baugh	834	27.9	+2.1
Liberal Democrats	Pauline Cliff	397	13.3	−1.9
Green	Martin Bate	226	7.6	−1.8
Majority		696	23.3	−0.5
Turnout		2,987	36.4	−9.5
Conservative hold		Swing		

=== May 2006 ===
2006
Party	Candidate	Votes	%	±%
Conservative	James Pearson*	1,392	49.6	−8.8
Labour	Ian Golding	725	25.8	−9.0
Liberal Democrats	Pauline Cliff	428	15.2	+8.5
Green	Martin Bate	263	9.4	+9.4
Majority		667	23.8	−7.9
Turnout		2,808	35.8	−9.5
Conservative hold		Swing		

=== May 2004 ===
2004 (after boundary changes)
Party	Candidate	Votes	%	±%
Conservative	Brenda Houraghan*	1,905	20.5	
Conservative	Kenneth Weston*	1,833	19.7	
Conservative	James Pearson	1,686	18.2	
Labour	Ian Golding	1,193	12.8	
Labour	Helen Walsh	1,081	11.6	
Labour	Martin Williams	968	10.4	
Liberal Democrats	Bryn Mallion	621	6.7	
Turnout		9,287	45.3	
Conservative win (new seat)				
Conservative win (new seat)				
Conservative win (new seat)				

=== May 2003 ===
2003
Party	Candidate	Votes	%	±%
Conservative	Brenda Houraghan	2,271	51.5	+9.6
Labour	Ian Golding	2,137	48.5	−1.4
Majority		134	3.0	
Turnout		4,408	51.9	−5.4
Conservative gain from Labour		Swing		

2002
Party	Candidate	Votes	%	±%
Labour	Jane Baugh*	2,454	49.9	+6.0
Conservative	Alexander Williams	2,060	41.9	−6.7
Independent	Guy Morgan	404	8.2	+8.2
Majority		394	8.0	
Turnout		4,918	57.3	+19.8
Labour hold		Swing		

=== May 2000 ===
2000
Party	Candidate	Votes	%	±%
Conservative	Kenneth Weston	1,588	48.6	+5.1
Labour	Joanne Bennett	1,435	43.9	−4.8
Liberal Democrats	Alan Brookes	243	7.4	−0.4
Majority		153	4.7	
Turnout		3,266	37.5	+0.4
Conservative hold		Swing		

== Elections in the 1990s ==
1999
Party	Candidate	Votes	%	±%
Labour	Chapman-Barker*	1,575	48.7	−2.6
Conservative	Cohen	1,409	43.5	+1.9
Liberal Democrats	Brookes	252	7.8	+0.6
Majority		166	5.2	−4.5
Turnout		3,236	37.1	−1.2
Labour hold		Swing		

1998
Party	Candidate	Votes	%	±%
Labour	J. E. Baugh*	1,704	51.3	+6.9
Conservative	D. C. Simm	1,383	41.6	−5.6
Liberal Democrats	D. Jones	238	7.2	−1.2
Majority		321	9.7	+6.8
Turnout		3,325	38.3	−5.4
Labour hold		Swing		

1996
Party	Candidate	Votes	%	±%
Conservative	K. Bullock*	1,767	47.2	+9.5
Labour	H. K. Western	1,660	44.4	−9.2
Liberal Democrats	P. A. Stubbs	314	8.4	−0.3
Majority		107	2.9	−13.0
Turnout		3,741	43.7	−1.1
Conservative hold		Swing		

1995
Party	Candidate	Votes	%	±%
Labour	J. D. Chapman-Barker	2,064	53.6	+4.5
Conservative	L. M. L. Burton*	1,451	37.7	+1.6
Liberal Democrats	P. A. Stubbs	333	8.7	−6.1
Majority		613	15.9	−2.9
Turnout		3,848	44.8	−2.2
Labour gain from Conservative		Swing		

1994
Party	Candidate	Votes	%	±%
Labour	J. E. Baugh*	2,068	49.1	+17.2
Conservative	L. Leggett	1,522	36.1	−18.7
Liberal Democrats	B. C. Lynch	623	14.8	+1.5
Majority		546	13.0	−9.9
Turnout		4,213	47.0	+6.0
Labour hold		Swing		

1992
Party	Candidate	Votes	%	±%
Conservative	K. Bullock	1,963	54.8	+7.3
Labour	E. R. Holden	1,141	31.9	−7.2
Liberal Democrats	B. C. Lynch	478	13.3	−0.1
Majority		822	22.9	+14.4
Turnout		3,582	41.0	0
Conservative hold		Swing		

1991
Party	Candidate	Votes	%	±%
Conservative	L. M. L. Burton*	1,923	47.5	+6.4
Labour	E. R. Holden	1,581	39.1	−5.6
Liberal Democrats	J. B. Weightman	542	13.4	+4.2
Majority		342	8.5	+4.9
Turnout		4,046	41.0	−7.0
Conservative hold		Swing		

1990
Party	Candidate	Votes	%	±%
Labour	J. E. Baugh	1,908	44.7	+8.0
Conservative	A. Rhodes	1,754	41.1	−10.8
Liberal Democrats	S. J. Chapman	391	9.2	−2.2
Green	M. Fielding	212	5.0	+5.0
Majority		154	3.6	−11.6
Turnout		4,265	48.0	+1.7
Labour hold		Swing		

== Elections in the 1980s ==
1988
Party	Candidate	Votes	%	±%
Conservative	M. J. Barltrop*	2,084	51.9	+2.7
Labour	J. E. Baugh	1,472	36.7	+8.0
Liberal Democrats	F. A. Cameron	459	11.4	−10.6
Majority		612	15.2	−5.3
Turnout		4,015	46.3	−5.5
Conservative hold		Swing		

1987
Party	Candidate	Votes	%	±%
Conservative	L. M. L. Burton*	2,203	49.2	+12.2
Labour	J. B. Morton	1,286	28.7	−8.9
SDP	N. Royle	986	22.0	−3.3
Majority		917	20.5	+20.1
Turnout		4,475	51.8	+5.9
Conservative hold		Swing		

1986 (2 vacancies)
Party	Candidate	Votes	%	±%
Labour	J. J. Hyland	1,387	19.4	+2.1
Conservative	M. J. Barltrop	1,334	18.7	−8.8
Conservative	M. G. Currie*	1,308	18.3	−9.6
Labour	J. B. Morton	1,300	18.2	−0.3
SDP	D. E. Armstrong	948	13.3	+9.5
SDP	R. C. Tweed	858	12.0	+6.9
Majority		26	0.4	−9.2
Turnout		7,135	45.9	+4.4
Labour gain from Conservative		Swing		
Conservative hold		Swing		

1984
Party	Candidate	Votes	%	±%
Conservative	H. G. Lawton	1,579	46.2	−2.6
Labour	G. Woodburn	1,252	36.7	+5.1
SDP	G. E. Evans	585	17.1	−2.5
Majority		327	9.6	−7.6
Turnout		3,416	41.5	−5.0
Conservative gain from Labour		Swing		

1983
Party	Candidate	Votes	%	±%
Conservative	L. M. L. Burton*	1,833	48.8	+4.1
Labour	R. J. Short	1,187	31.6	+4.0
Alliance	D. E. Armstrong	736	19.6	−8.1
Majority		646	17.2	+0.2
Turnout		3,756	46.5	+0.7
Conservative hold		Swing		

1982
Party	Candidate	Votes	%	±%
Conservative	M. G. Currie*	1,633	44.7	+3.8
SDP	M. J. Roberts	1,012	27.7	+27.7
Labour	N. P. Cooper	1,009	27.6	−16.5
Majority		621	17.0	+13.8
Turnout		3,654	45.8	+3.8
Conservative hold		Swing		

1980
Party	Candidate	Votes	%	±%
Labour	P. B. Dolan	1,470	44.1	+13.8
Conservative	A. K. Davies	1,363	40.9	−4.7
Liberal	B. Gaylard	499	15.0	−9.1
Majority		107	3.2	−12.0
Turnout		3,332	42.0	−35.3
Labour gain from Conservative		Swing		

== Elections in the 1970s ==
1979
Party	Candidate	Votes	%	±%
Conservative	L. M. L. Burton*	2,336	45.6	−10.0
Labour	E. Smith	1,555	30.3	+4.7
Liberal	B. Gaylard	1,236	24.1	+5.3
Majority		781	15.2	+1.6
Turnout		5,127	77.3	+41.8
Conservative hold		Swing		

1978 (2 vacancies)
Party	Candidate	Votes	%	±%
Conservative	M. G. Currie*	1,264	28.7	+3.1
Conservative	L. M. L. Burton	1,187	26.9	−0.5
Labour	E. Smith	587	13.3	+5.2
Labour	G. R. Gould	542	12.3	+3.2
Liberal	E. H. Faulkner	488	11.1	−2.1
Liberal	B. Gaylard	341	7.7	−8.9
Majority		600	13.6	−16.5
Turnout		4,409	35.5	+5.4
Conservative hold		Swing		
Conservative hold		Swing		

By-Election 24 March 1977
Party	Candidate	Votes	%	±%
Conservative	M. G. Currie	1,183	56.7	+2.4
Liberal	E. H. Faulkner	579	27.7	−3.4
Labour	P. B. Ayo	325	15.6	−5.8
Majority		604	28.9	−1.2
Turnout		2,087	31.7	−13.3
Conservative hold		Swing		

1976
Party	Candidate	Votes	%	±%
Conservative	G. R. Finch	1,610	54.3	+6.4
Liberal	E. H. Faulkner	719	24.3	−3.4
Labour	A. J. Hadley	635	21.4	−2.9
Majority		891	30.1	+9.9
Turnout		2,964	45.0	+0.9
Conservative hold		Swing		

1975
Party	Candidate	Votes	%	±%
Conservative	C. Harrison	1,387	47.9	
Liberal	E. H. Faulkner	803	27.7	
Labour	B. E. Jones	704	24.3	
Majority		584	20.2	
Turnout		2,894	44.1	
Conservative hold		Swing		

1973
Party	Candidate	Votes	%	±%
Conservative	F. R. Metcalf	1,093	16.4	
Conservative	D. W. Stroud	1,070	33.3	
Conservative	O. Wilson	1,054		
Labour	B. Jones	1,040	31.7	
Liberal	E. Faulkner	1,020	31.1	
Labour	J. Webb	974		
Liberal	B. Lynch	966		
Labour	M. Oliver	952		
Liberal	R. Allen	833		
Communist	E. Sheldon	129	3.9	
Majority		14		
Turnout		3,282	45.7	
Conservative win (new seat)				
Conservative win (new seat)				
Conservative win (new seat)				
