= 2003 Trafford Metropolitan Borough Council election =

2003 UK local government election

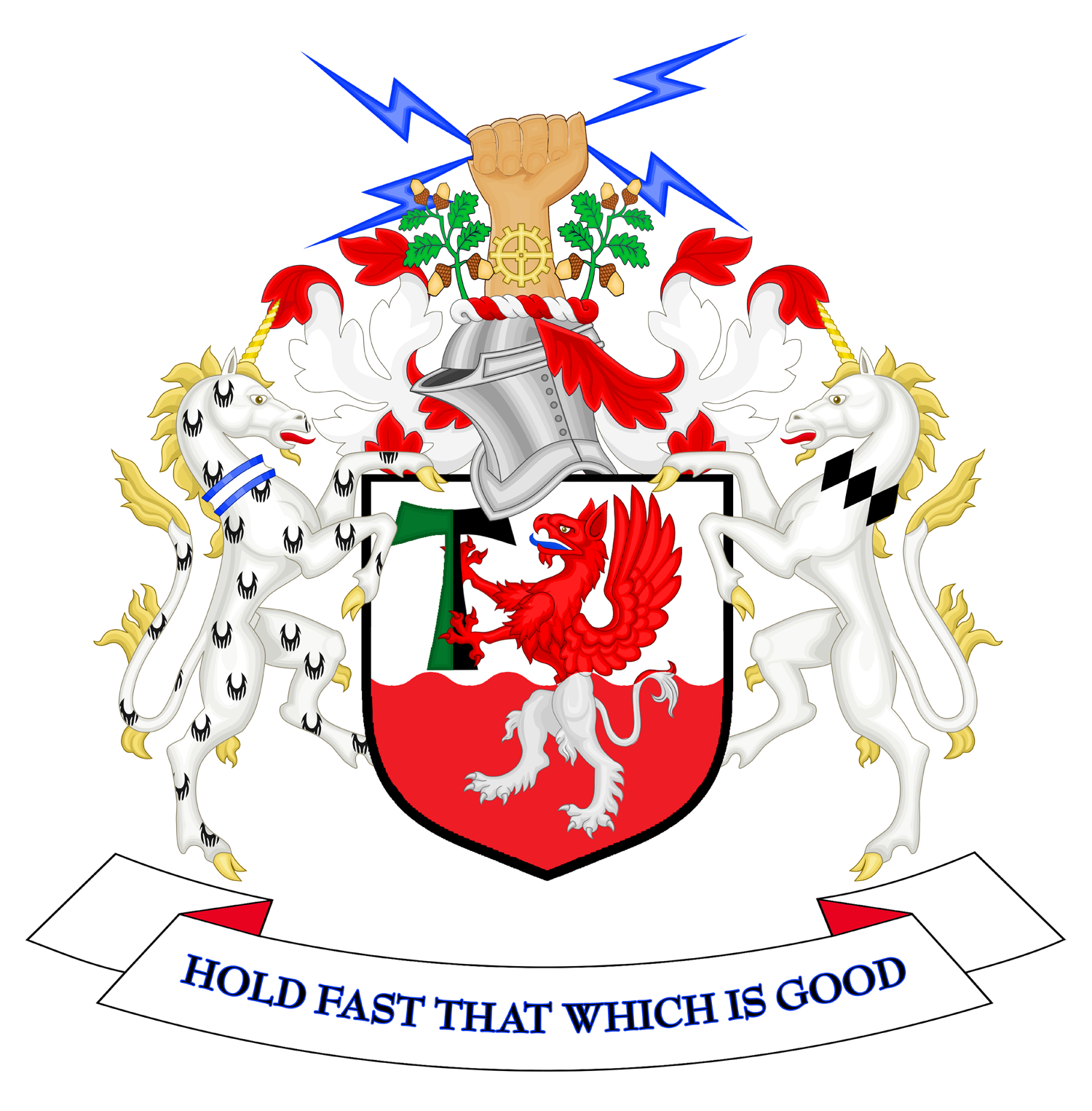
- 1 May 2003

21 of 63 seats to Trafford Metropolitan Borough Council 32 seats needed for a majority
	First party	Second party	Third party
Leader	David Acton	Susan Fildes	Ray Bowker
Party	Labour	Conservative	Liberal Democrats
Leader's seat	Urmston	Altrincham	Village
Last election	11 seats, 41.2%	9 seats, 45.1%	1 seats, 12.0%
Seats before	32	28	3
Seats won	10	10	1
Seats after	31	29	3
Seat change	▼1	▲1	Steady
Popular vote	30,192	38,792	11,371
Percentage	35.7%	45.9%	13.5%
Swing	▼5.5%	▲0.8%	▲1.5%
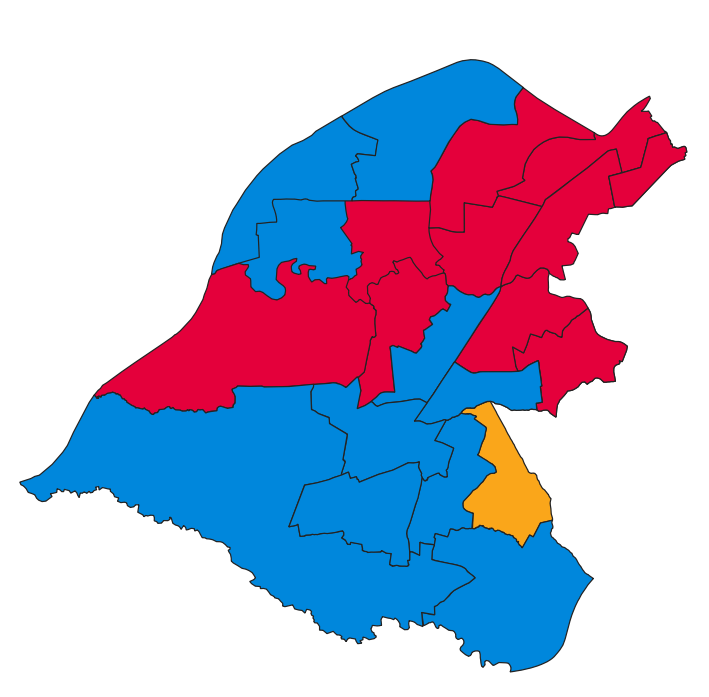
- Map of results of 2003 election
Leader of the Council before election
David Acton
Labour
Leader of the Council after election
David Acton
Labour

Elections to Trafford Council were held on 1 May 2003. One third of the council was up for election, with each successful candidate to serve a one-year term of office, expiring in 2004 due to the boundary changes and 'all-out' elections due to take place that year. The Labour Party lost overall control of the council, to no overall control. Overall turnout was 52.3%.

== Election result ==
Party	Votes		Seats			Full Council	
Labour Party	30,192 (35.7%)	▼5.5	10 (47.6%)	10 / 21	▼1	31 (49.2%)	31 / 63
Conservative Party	38,792 (45.9%)	▲0.8	10 (47.6%)	10 / 21	▲1	29 (46.0%)	29 / 63
Liberal Democrats	11,371 (13.5%)	▲1.5	1 (4.8%)	1 / 21	Steady	3 (4.8%)	3 / 63
Green Party	3,688 (4.4%)	▲3.6	0 (0.0%)	0 / 21	Steady	0 (0.0%)	0 / 63
Independent	398 (0.5%)	▼0.3	0 (0.0%)	0 / 21	Steady	0 (0.0%)	0 / 63
Socialist Labour Party	81 (0.1%)	▼0.1	0 (0.0%)	0 / 21	Steady	0 (0.0%)	0 / 63

↓
31	3	29

== Ward results ==
=== Altrincham ===
Altrincham
Party	Candidate	Votes	%	±%
Conservative	Alexander Williams	2,634	58.7	+4.2
Labour	David Armstrong	1,212	27.0	−5.0
Liberal Democrats	Roger Legge	641	14.3	+0.8
Majority		1,422	31.7	+9.2
Turnout		4,487	52.0	−0.8
Conservative hold		Swing		

=== Bowdon ===
Bowdon
Party	Candidate	Votes	%	±%
Conservative	Stephanie Poole*	3,475	65.7	+1.8
Liberal Democrats	Christopher Gaskill	870	16.5	+1.9
Labour	Helen Walsh	535	10.1	−4.6
Green	Bridget Green	408	7.7	+0.8
Majority		2,605	49.2	+0.0
Turnout		5,288	57.1	+0.4
Conservative hold		Swing		

=== Broadheath ===
Broadheath
Party	Candidate	Votes	%	±%
Conservative	Brenda Houraghan	2,271	51.5	+9.6
Labour	Ian Golding	2,137	48.5	−1.4
Majority		134	3.0	
Turnout		4,408	51.9	−5.4
Conservative gain from Labour		Swing		

=== Brooklands ===
Brooklands
Party	Candidate	Votes	%	±%
Conservative	Pamela Dixon*	2,247	47.6	−9.0
Liberal Democrats	Kenneth Clarke	1,149	24.3	+6.8
Labour	Joanne Bennett	1,083	22.9	−3.0
Green	Stephen Parker	245	5.2	+5.2
Majority		1,098	23.3	−7.4
Turnout		4,724	61.3	+7.0
Conservative hold		Swing		

=== Bucklow ===
Bucklow
Party	Candidate	Votes	%	±%
Labour	Ian Platt*	1,749	74.7	−0.6
Conservative	James Davies	592	25.3	+0.6
Majority		1,157	49.4	−1.2
Turnout		2,341	41.3	+0.3
Labour hold		Swing		

=== Clifford ===
Clifford
Party	Candidate	Votes	%	±%
Labour	Eunice Stennett*	1,714	55.3	−20.5
Green	Anne Power	854	27.6	+17.7
Conservative	Roderick Allan	532	17.2	+2.8
Majority		860	27.7	−33.7
Turnout		3,100	41.9	+1.9
Labour hold		Swing		

=== Davyhulme East ===
Davyhulme East
Party	Candidate	Votes	%	±%
Conservative	Eric Crosbie*	2,331	62.1	+4.7
Labour	Nigel Roberts	1,425	37.9	−4.8
Majority		906	24.2	+9.5
Turnout		3,756	53.8	+1.6
Conservative hold		Swing		

=== Davyhulme West ===
Davyhulme West
Party	Candidate	Votes	%	±%
Conservative	John Reilly*	2,525	60.1	+8.4
Labour	Dolores O'Sullivan	1,674	39.9	−8.5
Majority		851	20.2	+16.9
Turnout		4,199	55.9	−0.7
Conservative hold		Swing		

=== Flixton ===
Flixton
Party	Candidate	Votes	%	±%
Conservative	Jonathan Coupe*	2,130	51.0	−0.5
Labour	Karina Carter	1,652	39.5	−9.0
Independent	Paul Pickford	398	9.5	+9.5
Majority		478	11.5	+8.5
Turnout		4,180	57.1	+3.3
Conservative hold		Swing		

=== Hale ===
Hale
Party	Candidate	Votes	%	±%
Conservative	Patricia Morris	3,078	64.5	−4.6
Labour	Beverly Harrison	794	16.7	−0.5
Liberal Democrats	Jane Weightman	676	14.2	+0.4
Green	Samuel Little	222	4.7	+4.7
Majority		2,288	47.8	−4.1
Turnout		4,770	57.1	−0.9
Conservative hold		Swing		

=== Longford ===
Longford
Party	Candidate	Votes	%	±%
Labour	David Jarman*	1,708	49.7	−12.6
Conservative	Geoffrey Harding	1,233	35.9	−1.8
Green	Bernard Kelly	497	14.5	+14.5
Majority		475	13.8	−10.8
Turnout		3,438	48.4	−0.1
Labour hold		Swing		

=== Mersey-St. Mary's ===
Mersey St. Marys
Party	Candidate	Votes	%	±%
Conservative	John Lamb	2,877	54.4	−1.4
Labour	Sophie Taylor	1,548	29.3	−1.7
Liberal Democrats	Graham Rogers	779	14.7	+1.5
Socialist Labour	James Flannery	81	1.5	+1.5
Majority		1,329	25.1	+0.3
Turnout		5,285	55.8	+1.2
Conservative hold		Swing		

=== Park ===
Park
Party	Candidate	Votes	%	±%
Labour	Mary Strickland	1,604	61.5	−1.3
Conservative	John Schofield	1,006	38.5	+1.3
Majority		598	23.0	−2.6
Turnout		2,610	44.0	−2.8
Labour hold		Swing		

=== Priory ===
Priory
Party	Candidate	Votes	%	±%
Labour	Barbara Keeley*	1,620	40.9	−7.6
Conservative	Daniel Bunting	1,198	30.2	+0.2
Liberal Democrats	Michael Riley	907	22.9	+1.4
Green	Steven Flower	241	6.1	+6.1
Majority		422	10.7	−7.8
Turnout		3,966	54.6	+3.3
Labour hold		Swing		

=== Sale Moor ===
Sale Moor
Party	Candidate	Votes	%	±%
Labour	Munaver Rasul*	1,385	36.0	−11.5
Conservative	Pervez Nakvi	1,247	32.4	−0.3
Liberal Democrats	Margaret Clarke	1,212	31.5	+17.4
Majority		138	3.6	−11.2
Turnout		3,844	50.7	−2.5
Labour hold		Swing		

=== St. Martin's ===
St. Martins
Party	Candidate	Votes	%	±%
Labour	David Quayle*	2,148	51.2	−15.2
Conservative	Colin Foster	1,461	34.8	+1.2
Liberal Democrats	Richard Elliott	584	13.9	+13.9
Majority		687	16.4	−16.4
Turnout		4,193	53.3	+3.5
Labour hold		Swing		

=== Stretford ===
Stretford
Party	Candidate	Votes	%	±%
Labour	Bernice Garlick*	1,987	54.2	−4.1
Conservative	George Manley	1,331	36.3	−0.5
Green	Antony Quinn	350	9.5	+9.5
Majority		656	17.9	−3.6
Turnout		3,668	49.1	−1.7
Labour hold		Swing		

=== Talbot ===
Talbot
Party	Candidate	Votes	%	±%
Labour	Pauleen Lane*	1,505	60.8	−16.4
Conservative	Colin Levenston	570	23.0	+0.2
Green	Angela Hall	401	16.2	+16.2
Majority		935	37.8	−16.6
Turnout		2,476	40.2	+2.3
Labour hold		Swing		

=== Timperley ===
Timperley
Party	Candidate	Votes	%	±%
Conservative	Mauline Akins*	2,461	54.0	+0.6
Liberal Democrats	Catherine Smith	2,099	46.0	−0.6
Majority		362	8.0	+1.2
Turnout		4,560	52.5	+0.1
Conservative hold		Swing		

=== Urmston ===
Urmston
Party	Candidate	Votes	%	±%
Labour	Joyce Acton*	1,912	45.6	−11.2
Conservative	Christine Turner	1,808	43.2	+0.0
Green	Helen Jocys	470	11.2	+11.2
Majority		104	2.4	−11.2
Turnout		4,190	56.6	+2.6
Labour hold		Swing		

=== Village ===
Village
Party	Candidate	Votes	%	±%
Liberal Democrats	Jane Brophy	2,454	48.7	−16.4
Conservative	David Pate	1,785	35.4	+0.5
Labour	Martin Williams	800	15.9	+15.9
Majority		669	13.3	−16.9
Turnout		5,039	54.3	+3.7
Liberal Democrats hold		Swing		
