= 1992 Trafford Metropolitan Borough Council election =

1992 UK local government election

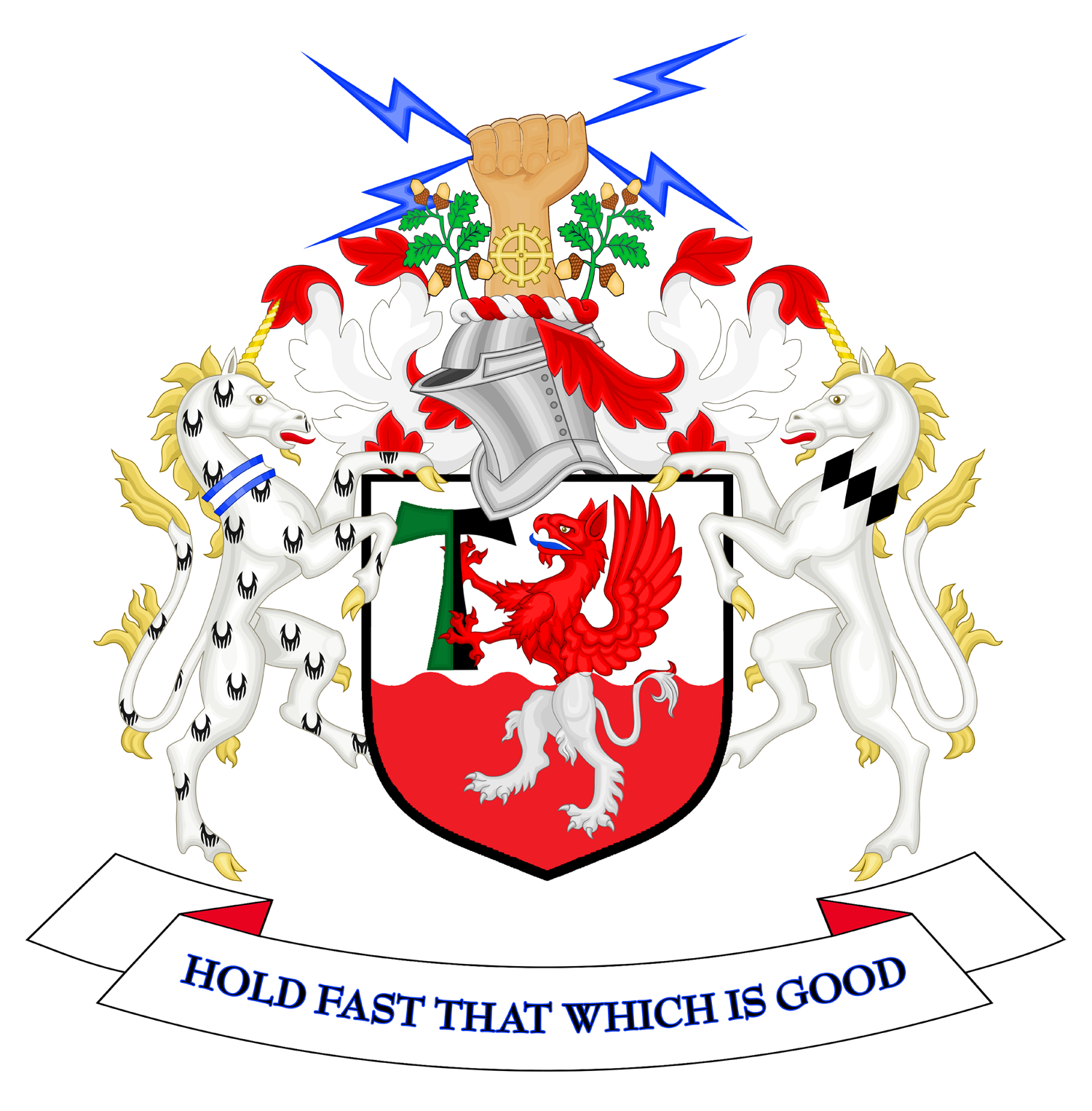
- 7 May 1992

22 of 63 seats to Trafford Metropolitan Borough Council 32 seats needed for a majority
	First party	Second party	Third party
Leader	Colin Warbrick	Barry Brotherton	Ray Bowker
Party	Conservative	Labour	Liberal Democrats
Leader's seat	Urmston	Sale Moor (defeated)	Village
Last election	12 seats, 46.7%	8 seats, 37.1%	2 seats, 14.7%
Seats before	34	26	4
Seats won	17	4	1
Seats after	37	22	4
Seat change	▲3	▼4	Steady
Popular vote	38,604	22,054	11,060
Percentage	53.4%	30.5%	15.3%
Swing	▲6.7%	▼6.6%	▲0.6%
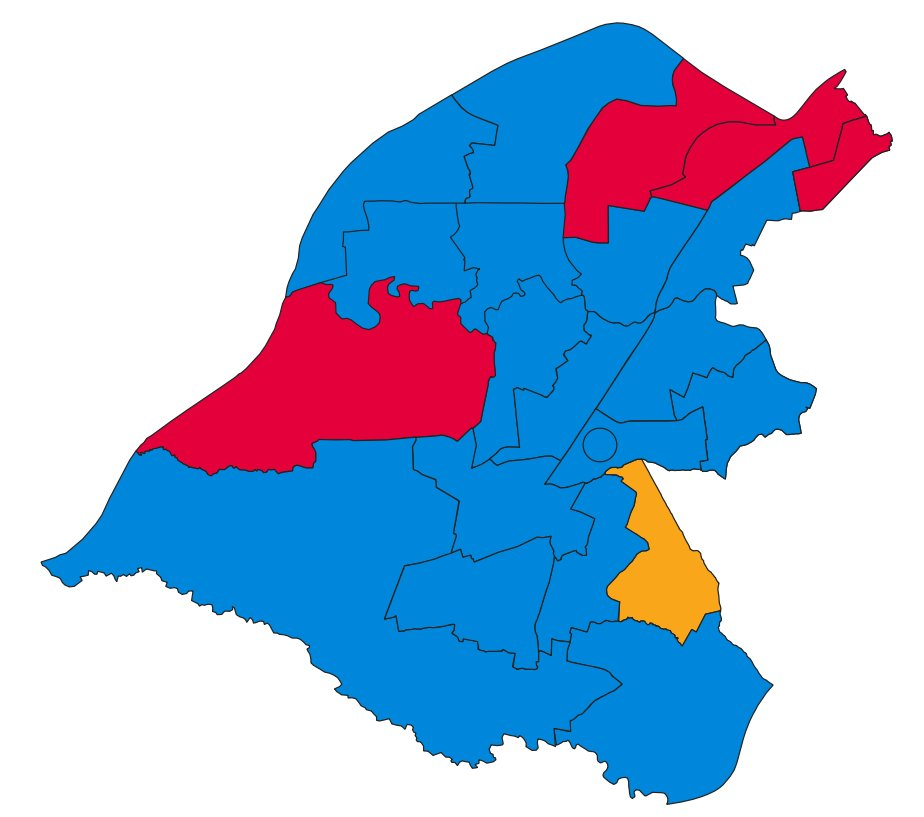
- Map of results of 1992 election
Leader of the Council before election
Colin Warbrick
Conservative
Leader of the Council after election
Colin Warbrick
Conservative

Elections to Trafford Council were held on 7 May 1992. One-third of the council was up for election, with each successful candidate to serve a four-year term of office, expiring in 1996. The Conservative party retained overall control of the council.

== Election result ==
Party	Votes		Seats			Full Council	
Conservative Party	38,604 (53.4%)	▲6.7	17 (77.3%)	17 / 22	▲3	37 (58.7%)	37 / 63
Labour Party	22,054 (30.5%)	▼6.6	4 (18.2%)	4 / 22	▲1	22 (34.9%)	22 / 63
Liberal Democrats	11,060 (15.3%)	▲0.6	1 (4.5%)	1 / 22	Steady	4 (6.3%)	4 / 63
Green Party	535 (0.7%)	▲0.5	0 (0.0%)	0 / 22	Steady	0 (0.0%)	0 / 63
Independent	21 (0.0%)	▼1.2	0 (0.0%)	0 / 22	Steady	0 (0.0%)	0 / 63

↓
22	4	37

== Ward results ==
=== Altrincham ===
Altrincham
Party	Candidate	Votes	%	±%
Conservative	S. M. O'Bierne*	2,001	58.2	+8.8
Labour	S. Hesford	979	28.5	−10.3
Liberal Democrats	P. A. Stubbs	357	10.4	−1.4
Green	B. J. Edwards	100	2.9	+2.9
Majority		1,022	29.7	+19.1
Turnout		3,437	40.8	−7.2
Conservative hold		Swing		

=== Bowdon ===
Bowdon
Party	Candidate	Votes	%	±%
Conservative	D. Merrell*	2,576	73.7	+6.6
Liberal Democrats	J. Preston	525	15.0	−1.5
Labour	H. F. Busteed	395	11.3	−1.8
Majority		2,051	58.7	−8.1
Turnout		3,496	39.8	−5.3
Conservative hold		Swing		

=== Broadheath ===
Broadheath
Party	Candidate	Votes	%	±%
Conservative	K. Bullock	1,963	54.8	+7.3
Labour	E. R. Holden	1,141	31.9	−7.2
Liberal Democrats	B. C. Lynch	478	13.3	−0.1
Majority		822	22.9	+14.4
Turnout		3,582	41.0	0
Conservative hold		Swing		

=== Brooklands ===
Brooklands (2 Councillors)
Party	Candidate	Votes	%	±%
Conservative	J. Taylor	2,302	34.5	+2.7
Conservative	D. F. Silverman	2,264	34.0	+2.2
Liberal Democrats	A. Rhodes	544	8.2	−2.4
Liberal Democrats	W. Rhodes	541	8.1	−2.5
Labour	D. G. Kirkland	455	6.8	−0.8
Labour	P. Miller	420	6.3	−1.3
Green	V. Birdsall	141	2.1	+2.1
Majority		1,720	51.6	+9.0
Turnout		6,667	43.1	−0.5
Conservative hold		Swing		
Conservative hold		Swing		

=== Bucklow ===
Bucklow
Party	Candidate	Votes	%	±%
Labour	H. Faulkner	1,263	68.9	+14.3
Liberal Democrats	Y. S. Robertson	569	31.1	+31.1
Majority		694	37.9	+16.8
Turnout		1,832	29.0	−5.9
Labour hold		Swing		

=== Clifford ===
Clifford
Party	Candidate	Votes	%	±%
Labour	S. Rogers*	1,317	62.1	−9.6
Conservative	M. T. Wyne	683	32.2	+3.9
Green	D. W. Alexander	120	5.7	+5.7
Majority		634	29.9	−13.5
Turnout		2,120	26.9	−7.3
Labour hold		Swing		

=== Davyhulme East ===
Davyhulme East
Party	Candidate	Votes	%	±%
Conservative	F. H. Eadie*	2,023	66.7	+14.5
Labour	A. P. Roberts	821	27.1	−8.3
Liberal Democrats	A. J. Storey	187	6.2	−1.2
Majority		1,202	39.7	+22.9
Turnout		3,031	40.6	−7.5
Conservative hold		Swing		

=== Davyhulme West ===
Davyhulme West
Party	Candidate	Votes	%	±%
Conservative	J. K. Ackerley*	2,162	56.6	+4.2
Labour	A. Stringer	1,445	37.8	+0.7
Liberal Democrats	M. E. Clarke	211	5.5	−5.0
Majority		717	18.8	+3.5
Turnout		3,818	43.2	−5.5
Conservative hold		Swing		

=== Flixton ===
Flixton
Party	Candidate	Votes	%	±%
Conservative	E. V. Ward	1,989	52.2	+8.1
Labour	G. A. Carter	936	24.6	−4.9
Liberal Democrats	A. Vernon	883	23.2	−3.2
Majority		1,053	27.7	+13.1
Turnout		3,808	48.6	+6.6
Conservative hold		Swing		

=== Hale ===
Hale
Party	Candidate	Votes	%	±%
Conservative	R. Godwin*	2,541	69.9	+2.1
Liberal Democrats	D. C. R. Horstead	840	23.1	+0.8
Labour	H. Baker	256	7.0	−2.9
Majority		1,701	46.8	+1.3
Turnout		3,637	42.7	−3.9
Conservative hold		Swing		

=== Longford ===
Longford
Party	Candidate	Votes	%	±%
Conservative	K. G. Summerfield	1,615	53.6	+4.8
Labour	K. Birchenough	1,309	43.4	−7.8
Green	D. Glazier	91	3.0	+3.0
Majority		306	10.1	+7.7
Turnout		3,015	40.9	−4.7
Conservative gain from Labour		Swing		

=== Mersey-St. Mary's ===
Mersey St. Marys
Party	Candidate	Votes	%	±%
Conservative	J. Tolhurst	2,732	69.6	+6.1
Labour	B. D. Eckford	774	19.7	−3.0
Liberal Democrats	R. M. Elliott	419	10.7	−3.1
Majority		1,958	49.9	+9.1
Turnout		3,925	42.0	−6.5
Conservative hold		Swing		

=== Park ===
Park
Party	Candidate	Votes	%	±%
Labour	J. Williams	955	47.4	−11.6
Conservative	E. J. Kelson	928	46.1	+5.1
Liberal Democrats	C. R. Hedley	132	6.6	+6.6
Majority		27	1.3	−16.6
Turnout		2,015	34.0	−7.4
Labour hold		Swing		

=== Priory ===
Priory
Party	Candidate	Votes	%	±%
Conservative	J. P. Flynn*	1,586	43.6	+11.5
Liberal Democrats	C. Smith	1,097	30.2	−6.8
Labour	G. Smethurst	952	26.2	−4.7
Majority		489	13.5	+8.6
Turnout		3,635	47.0	−2.9
Conservative hold		Swing		

=== Sale Moor ===
Sale Moor
Party	Candidate	Votes	%	±%
Conservative	D. R. Baldwin	1,419	44.1	+6.6
Labour	B. Brotherton*	1,269	39.4	−4.5
Liberal Democrats	A. P. Sutherland	530	16.5	−2.1
Majority		150	4.7	−1.7
Turnout		3,218	42.2	−5.2
Conservative gain from Labour		Swing		

=== St. Martin's ===
St. Martins
Party	Candidate	Votes	%	±%
Conservative	R. Nicholas	1,564	47.5	+9.5
Labour	K. Harper	1,502	45.6	−6.1
Liberal Democrats	T. J. P. Corbett	230	7.0	−3.2
Majority		62	1.9	−11.8
Turnout		3,296	36.6	−6.2
Conservative gain from Labour		Swing		

=== Stretford ===
Stretford
Party	Candidate	Votes	%	±%
Conservative	H. Walker	2,048	53.2	+7.3
Labour	J. T. Beer*	1,643	42.7	−3.1
Liberal Democrats	S. D. Bowater	125	3.2	−5.0
Green	C. I. Kirby	36	0.9	+0.9
Majority		405	10.5	+10.4
Turnout		3,852	48.4	−1.1
Conservative gain from Labour		Swing		

=== Talbot ===
Talbot
Party	Candidate	Votes	%	±%
Labour	A. Bates	1,235	63.2	−5.9
Conservative	C. J. Levenston	650	33.3	+2.4
Green	J. H. Piprani	47	2.4	+2.4
Independent	K. J. Martin	21	1.1	+1.1
Majority		585	30.0	−8.1
Turnout		1,953	29.1	−8.1
Labour hold		Swing		

=== Timperley ===
Timperley
Party	Candidate	Votes	%	±%
Conservative	A. K. Davies*	2,052	55.9	+3.4
Liberal Democrats	J. E. Brophy	984	26.8	+4.0
Labour	T. G. Crewe	637	17.3	−7.5
Majority		1,068	29.1	+1.4
Turnout		3,673	42.0	−5.3
Conservative hold		Swing		

=== Urmston ===
Urmston
Party	Candidate	Votes	%	±%
Conservative	C. Warbrick*	2,001	55.7	+5.5
Labour	L. M. Seex	1,451	40.4	−9.4
Liberal Democrats	D. J. Kelly	143	4.0	+4.0
Majority		550	15.3	+14.9
Turnout		3,595	47.5	−3.0
Conservative hold		Swing		

=== Village ===
Village
Party	Candidate	Votes	%	±%
Liberal Democrats	R. Bowker*	2,265	48.5	+10.2
Conservative	M. E. King	1,505	32.2	−4.0
Labour	R. W. J. Small	899	19.3	−6.2
Majority		760	16.3	+14.3
Turnout		4,669	47.7	−5.5
Liberal Democrats hold		Swing		

== By-elections between 1992 and 1994 ==
Clifford By-Election 16 December 1993
Party	Candidate	Votes	%	±%
Labour	E. W. Stennett	1,207	78.8	+16.7
Conservative	C. H. Davenport	226	14.8	−17.4
Liberal Democrats	F. C. Beswick	99	6.5	+6.5
Majority		981	64.0	+34.1
Turnout		1,532	17.9	
Labour hold		Swing		
