= 2011 Trafford Metropolitan Borough Council election =

2011 UK local government election

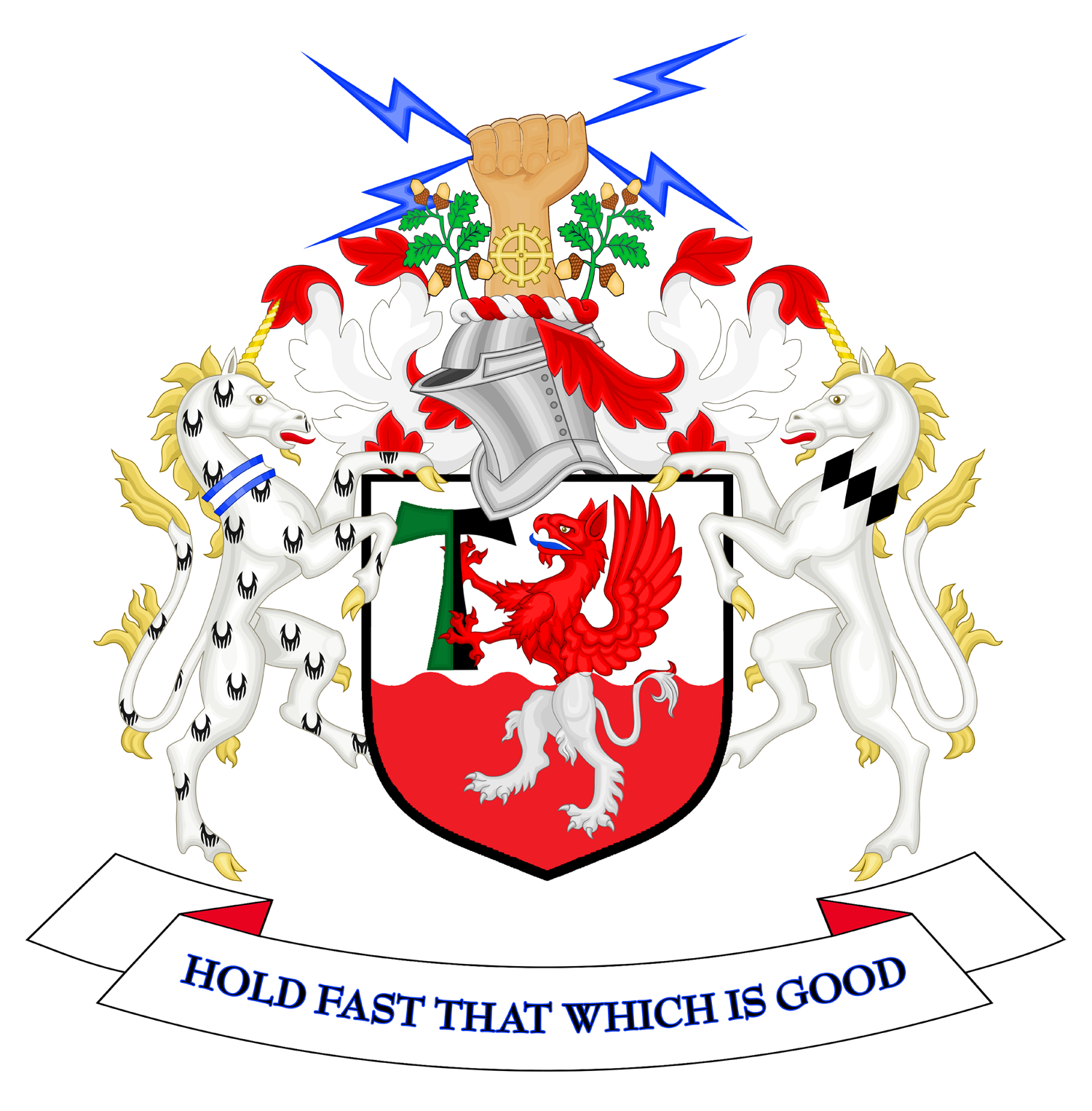
- 5 May 2011

22 of 63 seats to Trafford Metropolitan Borough Council 32 seats needed for a majority
	First party	Second party	Third party
Leader	Matt Colledge	David Acton	Ray Bowker
Party	Conservative	Labour	Liberal Democrats
Leader's seat	Altrincham	Gorse Hill	Village
Last election	12 seats, 40.3%	8 seats, 31.7%	2 seats, 22.8%
Seats before	37	21	5
Seats won	14	8	0
Seats after	37	22	4
Seat change	Steady	▲1	▼1
Popular vote	32,376	29,596	7,459
Percentage	43.1%	39.4%	9.9%
Swing	▲2.8%	▲7.7%	▼12.9%
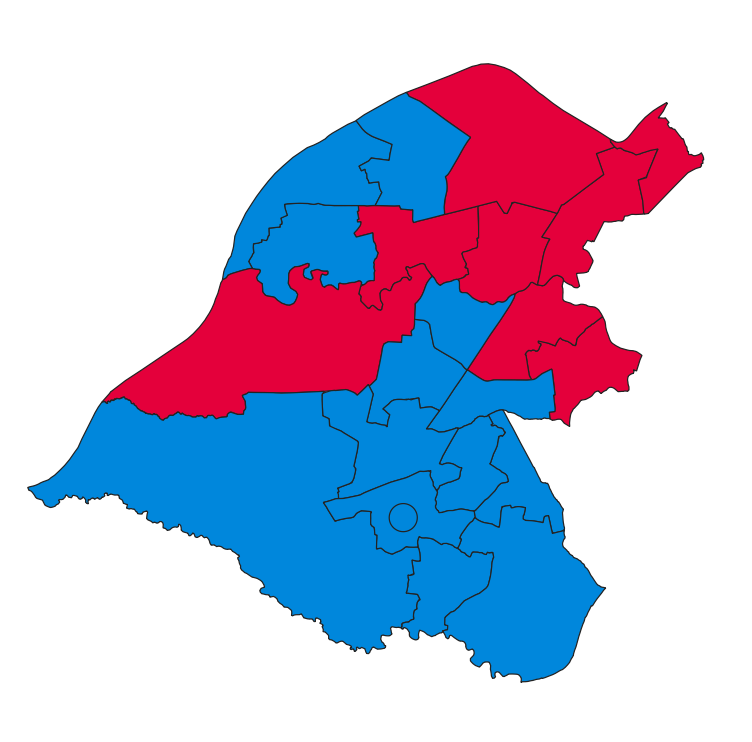
- Map of results of 2011 election
Leader of the Council before election
Matt Colledge
Conservative
Leader of the Council after election
Matt Colledge
Conservative

Elections to the Council of the metropolitan borough of Trafford, Greater Manchester, England were held on 5 May 2011. One third of the council was up for election, with each successful candidate serving a four-year term of office, expiring in 2015. The Conservative Party retained overall control of the council.

== Election result ==
Party	Votes		Seats			Full Council	
Conservative Party	32,376 (43.1%)	▲2.8	14 (63.6%)	14 / 22	Steady	37 (58.7%)	37 / 63
Labour Party	29,596 (39.4%)	▲7.7	8 (36.4%)	8 / 22	▲1	22 (34.9%)	22 / 63
Liberal Democrats	7,459 (9.9%)	▼12.9	0 (0.0%)	0 / 22	▼1	4 (6.3%)	4 / 63
Green Party	5,172 (6.9%)	▲2.2	0 (0.0%)	0 / 22	Steady	0 (0.0%)	0 / 63
UKIP	542 (0.7%)	▲0.3	0 (0.0%)	0 / 22	Steady	0 (0.0%)	0 / 63

↓
22	4	37

== Ward results ==
=== Altrincham ward ===
Altrincham (2 vacancies)
Party	Candidate	Votes	%	±%
Conservative	Matt Colledge	1,752	50.3	−5.7
Conservative	Alex Williams*	1,563		
Labour	Gwyneth Brock	1,036	29.9	+7.4
Labour	Thom Shelton	934		
Liberal Democrats	Karin Holden	431	11.9	−2.4
Liberal Democrats	Roger Legge	355		
Green	Paul Bayliss	286	7.9	−0.7
Green	Deborah Leftwich	238		
Majority		527	16.0	−17.4
Turnout		6,595	42.5	+4.4
Conservative hold		Swing		
Conservative hold		Swing		

=== Ashton upon Mersey ward ===
Ashton upon Mersey
Party	Candidate	Votes	%	±%
Conservative	Mike Whetton*	1,715	50.5	−4.8
Labour	Michael Wilton	1,162	34.2	+13.0
Liberal Democrats	Christopher Marritt	288	8.5	−4.1
Green	Joseph Westbrook	229	6.7	−4.2
Majority		553	16.3	−17.8
Turnout		3,394	46.3	+4.2
Conservative hold		Swing		

=== Bowdon ward ===
Bowdon
Party	Candidate	Votes	%	±%
Conservative	Michael Hyman*	2,497	70.7	−0.3
Labour	Thomas Hague	541	15.3	+5.4
Green	Bridget Green	251	7.1	−0.3
Liberal Democrats	Kirstie Davidson	242	6.9	−4.8
Majority		1,956	55.4	−3.9
Turnout		3,531	48.6	+7.1
Conservative hold		Swing		

=== Broadheath ward ===
Broadheath
Party	Candidate	Votes	%	±%
Conservative	Ken Weston*	1,879	43.2	−8.0
Labour	Andrew Leask	1,757	40.4	+12.5
Liberal Democrats	Sandra Taylor	307	7.1	−6.2
UKIP	John Walsh	205	4.7	N/A
Green	Sara Ahsan	202	4.6	−3.0
Majority		122	2.8	−20.5
Turnout		4,350	45.9	+9.5
Conservative hold		Swing		

=== Brooklands ward ===
Brooklands
Party	Candidate	Votes	%	±%
Conservative	David Higgins*	1,995	52.7	−3.5
Labour	Lewis Dagnall	1,172	31.0	+14.0
Liberal Democrats	John O'Connor	393	10.4	−9.1
Green	Joseph Ryan	226	6.0	−1.3
Majority		823	21.7	−15.0
Turnout		3,786	47.7	+7.3
Conservative hold		Swing		

=== Bucklow-St. Martins ward ===
Bucklow-St. Martins
Party	Candidate	Votes	%	±%
Labour	John Smith*	1,432	63.3	+10.7
Conservative	Lee Peck	553	24.5	−0.1
Green	Daniel Wadsworth	153	6.8	−1.8
Liberal Democrats	Graham Rogers	123	5.4	N/A
Majority		879	38.9	+10.9
Turnout		2,261	31.6	+0.2
Labour hold		Swing		

=== Clifford ward ===
Clifford
Party	Candidate	Votes	%	±%
Labour	Ejaz Malik*	2,310	76.2	+17.0
Green	Anne Power	354	11.7	−3.6
Conservative	Alex Finney	247	8.1	−4.6
Liberal Democrats	Alan Sherliker	121	4.0	−8.9
Majority		1,956	64.5	+20.6
Turnout		3,032	39.6	+6.2
Labour hold		Swing		

=== Davyhulme East ward ===
Davyhulme East
Party	Candidate	Votes	%	±%
Conservative	Lisa Cooke	1,759	51.0	−7.4
Labour	Helen Simpson	1,448	42.0	+10.6
Green	Jennie Wadsworth	134	3.9	−3.1
Liberal Democrats	Louise Bird	105	3.0	N/A
Majority		311	9.0	−18.0
Turnout		3,446	44.7	+6.5
Conservative hold		Swing		

=== Davyhulme West ward ===
Davyhulme West
Party	Candidate	Votes	%	±%
Conservative	John Reilly*	1,666	51.5	−9.1
Labour	Joyce Acton	1,261	39.0	+8.7
Green	Jonathan Carr	189	5.8	−3.3
Liberal Democrats	Elizabeth Hogg	119	3.7	N/A
Majority		405	12.5	−17.9
Turnout		3,235	42.9	+3.7
Conservative hold		Swing		

=== Flixton ward ===
Flixton
Party	Candidate	Votes	%	±%
Conservative	Jonathan Coupe*	1,754	47.9	−2.8
Labour	Freda Mottley	1,473	40.2	+7.8
Green	Alison Cavanagh	284	7.8	+1.0
Liberal Democrats	Richard Elliott	150	4.1	−6.0
Majority		281	7.7	−10.7
Turnout		3,661	43.8	+3.6
Conservative hold		Swing		

=== Gorse Hill ward ===
Gorse Hill
Party	Candidate	Votes	%	±%
Labour	Michael Cordingley*	1,787	67.8	−9.8
Conservative	Samuel Martin	515	19.5	−3.6
Green	Philip Leape	198	7.5	−4.2
Liberal Democrats	Renee Matthews	137	5.2	−2.0
Majority		1,272	48.3	
Turnout		2,637	32.9	+4.1
Labour hold		Swing		

=== Hale Barns ward ===
Hale Barns
Party	Candidate	Votes	%	±%
Conservative	Bernard Sharp*	2,439	68.5	−1.3
Labour Co-op	Barbara Twiney	549	15.4	+6.3
Liberal Democrats	Barbara Doyle	391	11.0	−5.4
Green	Sarah McIlroy	180	5.1	+0.4
Majority		1,890	53.1	−0.3
Turnout		3,559	46.8	+4.6
Conservative hold		Swing		

=== Hale Central ward ===
Hale Central
Party	Candidate	Votes	%	±%
Conservative	Patricia Young*	2,040	59.0	−4.2
Labour Co-op	Beverley Harrison	751	21.7	+7.9
Liberal Democrats	Julian Newgrosh	339	9.8	−0.6
Green	Samuel Little	327	9.5	−3.2
Majority		1,289	37.3	−12.1
Turnout		3,457	45.9	+5.4
Conservative hold		Swing		

=== Longford ward ===
Longford
Party	Candidate	Votes	%	±%
Labour	Anne Duffield	2,194	63.0	+17.5
Conservative	Paul Lally	734	21.1	−8.9
Green	Margaret Westbrook	389	11.2	−2.2
Liberal Democrats	Dawn Carberry-Power	164	4.7	−6.3
Majority		1,460	41.9	+26.5
Turnout		3,481	39.9	+4.8
Labour hold		Swing		

=== Priory ward ===
4

Priory
Party	Candidate	Votes	%	±%
Labour	Andrew Western	1,510	43.3	+1.3
Conservative	Zubair Ali	993	28.5	−3.3
Liberal Democrats	William Jones	620	17.8	+3.6
Green	Emma Handley	364	10.4	−1.6
Majority		517	14.8	+4.6
Turnout		3,487	43.9	+4.3
Labour hold		Swing		

=== Sale Moor ward ===
Sale Moor
Party	Candidate	Votes	%	±%
Labour Co-op	Joanne Bennett*	1,494	47.3	+6.7
Conservative	Michael Parris	1,260	39.9	+4.9
Liberal Democrats	Joseph Carter	216	6.8	−3.8
Green	Nigel Woodcock	191	6.0	−0.8
Majority		234	7.4	+1.8
Turnout		3,161	41.7	+2.5
Labour hold		Swing		

=== St. Mary's ward ===
St. Mary's
Party	Candidate	Votes	%	±%
Conservative	Daniel Bunting*	1,773	50.4	−4.5
Labour	Matthew Finnegan	1,246	35.4	+9.2
UKIP	Stephen Farndon	201	5.7	+2.4
Liberal Democrats	Jordan Cooper	190	5.4	−5.7
Green	Iram Zaman	108	3.1	+1.4
Majority		527	15.0	−13.7
Turnout		3,518	40.0	+3.8
Conservative hold		Swing		

=== Stretford ward ===
Stretford
Party	Candidate	Votes	%	±%
Labour	Stephen Adshead*	1,923	61.2	+10.3
Conservative	Colin Hooley	766	24.4	−6.5
Green	Liz O'Neill	299	9.5	+0.9
Liberal Democrats	Louise Shaw	154	4.9	−4.7
Majority		1,157	36.8	+16.8
Turnout		3,142	40.3	+3.4
Labour hold		Swing		

=== Timperley ward ===
Timperley
Party	Candidate	Votes	%	±%
Conservative	Angela Bruer-Morris	1,820	42.8	−5.5
Liberal Democrats	Pauline Cliff	1,318	31.0	−16.5
Labour	Peter Baugh	924	21.7	N/A
Green	Jadwiga Leigh	191	4.5	+0.3
Majority		502	11.8	+11.0
Turnout		4,253	50.6	+1.3
Conservative hold		Swing		

=== Urmston ward ===
Urmston
Party	Candidate	Votes	%	±%
Labour	Joanne Harding	1,786	48.3	+9.0
Conservative	Eddie Kelson*	1,441	38.9	−4.7
Green	Helen Jocys	196	5.3	−3.6
Liberal Democrats	Paul Hurst	142	3.8	−4.4
UKIP	Robert Rawcliffe	136	3.7	N/A
Majority		345	9.4	
Turnout		3,701	46.0	+3.3
Labour gain from Conservative		Swing		

=== Village ward ===
Village
Party	Candidate	Votes	%	±%
Conservative	Laura Evans	1,215	35.1	−1.3
Liberal Democrats	John Kenyon	1,154	33.4	−16.3
Labour	Majella Kennedy	906	26.2	+16.5
Green	Michael Leigh	183	5.3	+1.1
Majority		61	1.7	
Turnout		3,458	44.1	−4.0
Conservative gain from Liberal Democrats		Swing		
