= 1984 Trafford Metropolitan Borough Council election =

1984 UK local government election

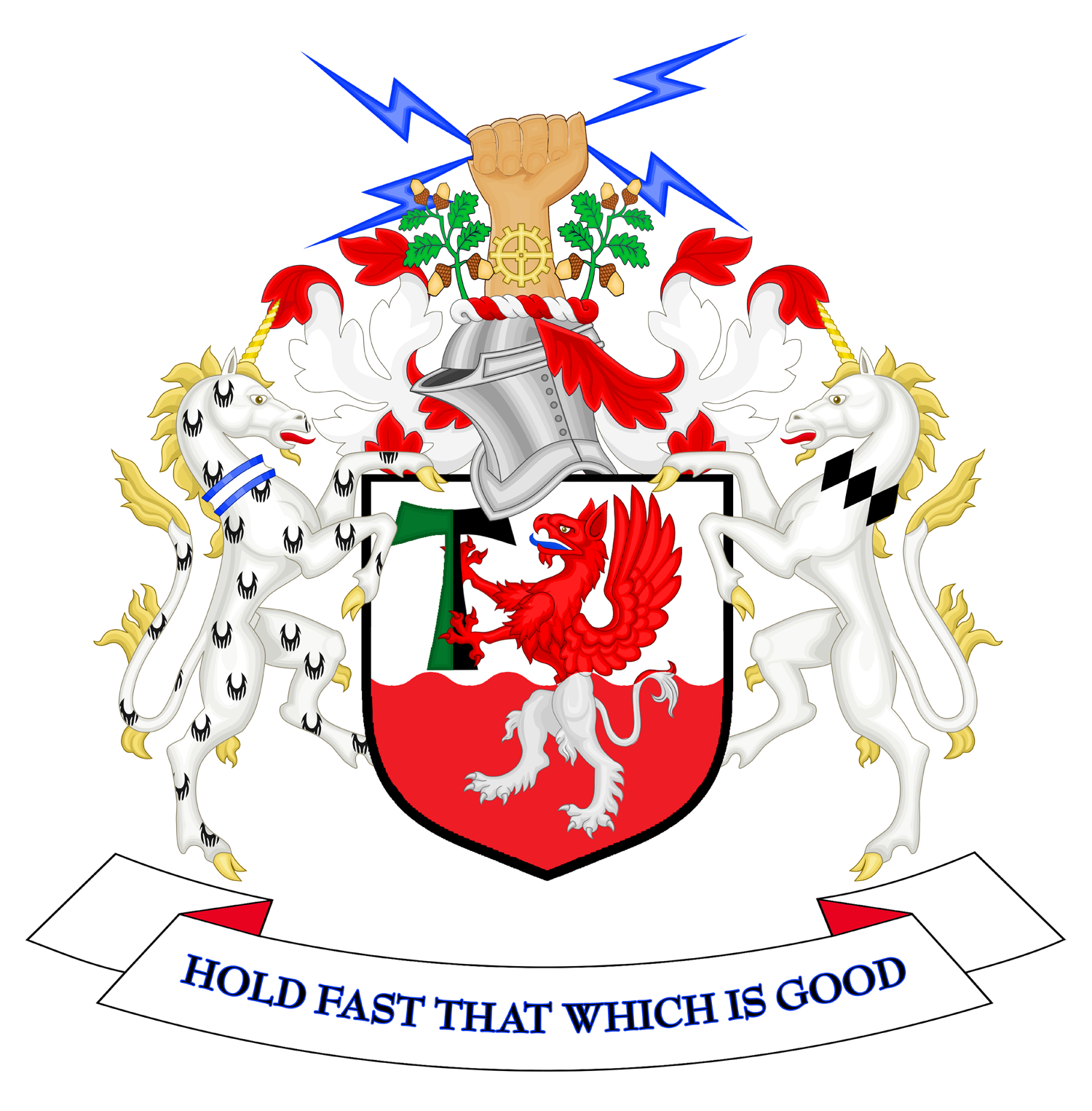
- 3 May 1984

21 of 63 seats to Trafford Metropolitan Borough Council 32 seats needed for a majority
	First party	Second party	Third party
Leader	Mike King	Richard Mee	John Golding
Party	Conservative	Labour	Alliance
Leader's seat	St. Martin's	Sale Moor	Priory
Last election	14 seats, 45.1%	6 seats, 32.0%	2 seats, 22.9%
Seats before	36	21	6
Seats won	9	6	4
Seats after	36	19	8
Seat change	Steady	▼2	▲2
Popular vote	30,852	26,112	14,812
Percentage	42.2%	35.7%	20.3%
Swing	▼2.9%	▲3.7%	▼2.6%
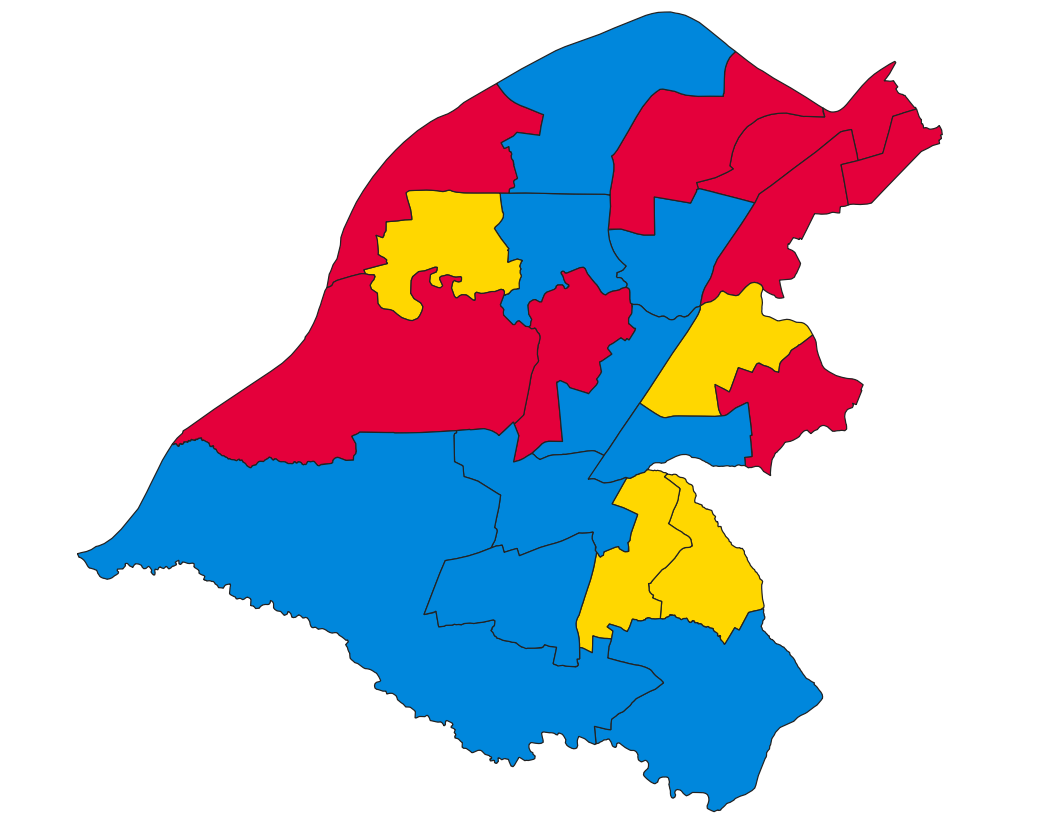
- Map of results of 1984 election
Leader of the Council before election
Mike King
Conservative
Leader of the Council after election
Mike King
Conservative

Elections to Trafford Council were held on 3 May 1984. One third of the council was up for election, with each successful candidate to serve a four-year term of office, expiring in 1988. The Conservative Party retained overall control of the council.

Due to the death of one of the candidates for Timperley ward after the close of nominations, the election for Timperley was postponed until 28 June 1984. The result shown on this page is the result of that election.

== Election result ==
Party	Votes		Seats			Full Council	
Conservative Party	30,852 (42.2%)	▼2.9	9 (42.9%)	9 / 21	Steady	36 (57.1%)	36 / 63
Labour Party	26,112 (35.7%)	▲3.7	8 (38.1%)	8 / 21	▼2	19 (30.2%)	19 / 63
Alliance	14,812 (20.3%)	▼2.6	4 (19.0%)	4 / 21	▲2	8 (12.7%)	8 / 63
Independent	821 (1.1%)	N/A	0 (0.0%)	0 / 21	N/A	0 (0.0%)	0 / 63
Ecology Party	503 (0.7%)	N/A	0 (0.0%)	0 / 21	N/A	0 (0.0%)	0 / 63

↓
19	8	36

== Ward results ==
=== Altrincham ===
Altrincham
Party	Candidate	Votes	%	±%
Conservative	G. R. Finch*	1,473	43.6	−5.7
Labour	P. A. Baldwinson	1,312	38.8	+6.6
Liberal	P. C. Barns	540	16.0	−2.5
Ecology	A. M. Wildbore	53	1.6	+1.6
Majority		161	4.8	−12.3
Turnout		3,378	42.2	+1.0
Conservative hold		Swing		

=== Bowdon ===
Bowdon
Party	Candidate	Votes	%	±%
Conservative	Barbara Sutton Hall*	2,563	73.1	+5.2
Labour	J. B. Morton	594	16.9	+5.9
Ecology	J. S. Menzies	350	10.0	+10.0
Majority		1,969	56.1	+9.3
Turnout		3,507	39.6	−10.0
Conservative hold		Swing		

=== Broadheath ===
Broadheath
Party	Candidate	Votes	%	±%
Conservative	H. G. Lawton	1,579	46.2	−2.6
Labour	G. Woodburn	1,252	36.7	+5.1
SDP	G. E. Evans	585	17.1	−2.5
Majority		327	9.6	−7.6
Turnout		3,416	41.5	−5.0
Conservative gain from Labour		Swing		

=== Brooklands ===
Brooklands
Party	Candidate	Votes	%	±%
Conservative	R. Barber	1,892	51.5	−11.8
Liberal	Cecil Fink	1,365	37.2	+12.4
Labour	Len Murkin	416	11.3	−0.7
Majority		527	14.3	−24.2
Turnout		3,673	45.6	−6.0
Conservative hold		Swing		

=== Bucklow ===
Bucklow
Party	Candidate	Votes	%	±%
Labour	J. D. Paul*	1,451	55.6	−12.3
Independent	F. M. Woods	408	15.6	+15.6
Conservative	M. E. Hindley	335	12.8	−8.0
Independent	R. Bennett	323	12.4	+12.4
Liberal	J. Preston	94	3.6	−7.7
Majority		1,043	39.9	−7.2
Turnout		2,611	37.8	+0.8
Labour hold		Swing		

=== Clifford ===
Clifford
Party	Candidate	Votes	%	±%
Labour	S. Rogers	2,306	71.0	+12.5
Conservative	P. S. G. Westwell	943	29.0	−2.1
Majority		1,363	42.0	+14.7
Turnout		3,249	37.7	−5.6
Labour hold		Swing		

=== Davyhulme East ===
Davyhulme East
Party	Candidate	Votes	%	±%
Conservative	Frank Eadie*	1,547	45.7	+1.0
Labour	J. B. Roberts	1,177	34.8	+0.9
Liberal	A. D. Sanders	660	19.5	−1.9
Majority		370	10.9	+0.2
Turnout		3,384	43.7	−10.6
Conservative hold		Swing		

=== Davyhulme West ===
Davyhulme West
Party	Candidate	Votes	%	±%
Labour	L. M. Seex	1,997	47.4	+5.4
Conservative	D. Makin	1,857	44.1	−1.3
SDP	K. W. Bower	358	8.5	−4.1
Majority		140	3.3	−0.1
Turnout		4,212	48.9	−2.2
Labour hold		Swing		

=== Flixton ===
Flixton
Party	Candidate	Votes	%	±%
Liberal	Alan Vernon	1,590	38.4	−3.4
Conservative	Neil Fitzpatrick*	1,551	37.5	−2.8
Labour	M. J. Goggins	996	24.1	+6.2
Majority		39	0.9	−0.6
Turnout		4,137	51.7	−4.3
Liberal gain from Conservative		Swing		

=== Hale ===
Hale
Party	Candidate	Votes	%	±%
Conservative	Roy Godwin*	2,444	62.9	−6.3
Liberal	John Mulholland	1,108	28.5	+5.5
Labour	M. A. Busteed	236	6.1	−1.7
Ecology	J. J. Wharton	100	2.6	+2.6
Majority		1,336	34.4	−11.8
Turnout		3,888	44.2	−4.2
Conservative hold		Swing		

=== Longford ===
Longford
Party	Candidate	Votes	%	±%
Labour	M. E. Cottam*	1,848	54.3	+9.9
Conservative	I. B. Simmonds	1,556	45.7	−0.2
Majority		292	8.6	+7.1
Turnout		3,404	44.3	−4.8
Labour hold		Swing		

=== Mersey-St. Mary's ===
Mersey St. Marys
Party	Candidate	Votes	%	±%
Conservative	D. F. Silverman	2,212	58.9	−0.8
Liberal	J. B. Weightman	914	24.3	−2.6
Labour	M. R. H. Bradbury	631	16.8	+3.4
Majority		1,298	34.5	+1.7
Turnout		3,757	39.1	−7.4
Conservative hold		Swing		

=== Park ===
Park
Party	Candidate	Votes	%	±%
Labour	C. Reid	1,413	55.3	+6.0
Conservative	D. Meadowcroft	883	34.6	−3.1
Liberal	C. R. Hedley	259	10.1	−2.9
Majority		530	20.7	+9.1
Turnout		2,555	40.2	−5.5
Labour hold		Swing		

=== Priory ===
Priory
Party	Candidate	Votes	%	±%
Liberal	John Golding*	1,307	39.7	−7.0
Conservative	P. Schofield	1,139	34.6	−1.1
Labour	Roland Griffin	848	25.7	+8.1
Majority		168	5.1	−5.8
Turnout		3,294	41.3	−3.8
Liberal hold		Swing		

=== Sale Moor ===
Sale Moor
Party	Candidate	Votes	%	±%
Labour	Barry Brotherton*	1,376	41.7	+1.2
Conservative	E. A. Robinson	1,153	35.0	−0.1
SDP	R. C. Tweed	769	23.3	−1.0
Majority		223	6.8	+1.4
Turnout		3,298	42.1	−4.6
Labour hold		Swing		

=== St. Martin's ===
St. Martins
Party	Candidate	Votes	%	±%
Labour	Alan Hadley*	2,130	52.6	0
Conservative	P. Bates	1,275	31.5	−2.2
Liberal	S. Corbett	642	15.9	+2.2
Majority		855	21.1	+2.3
Turnout		4,047	42.7	−1.5
Labour hold		Swing		

=== Stretford ===
Stretford
Party	Candidate	Votes	%	±%
Conservative	F. D. Redfern	1,616	45.8	−1.6
Labour	J. F. L. Wood	1,496	42.4	+2.3
SDP	L. L. Sumner	416	11.8	−0.7
Majority		120	3.4	−3.8
Turnout		3,528	43.3	−4.7
Conservative gain from Labour		Swing		

=== Talbot ===
Talbot
Party	Candidate	Votes	%	±%
Labour	D. L. Sullivan*	1,744	67.6	+5.5
Conservative	C. J. Levenston	747	28.9	+2.6
Independent	K. J. Martin	90	3.5	+3.5
Majority		997	38.6	+2.8
Turnout		2,581	35.2	−4.4
Labour hold		Swing		

=== Timperley ===
Timperley (election held 28 June 1984)
Party	Candidate	Votes	%	±%
Liberal	John Davenport	1,590	45.1	+3.5
Conservative	A. Rhodes	1,252	35.5	−9.9
Labour	A. G. Hodson	687	19.5	+6.5
Majority		338	9.6	+5.8
Turnout		3,529	39.1	−10.0
Liberal gain from Conservative		Swing		

=== Urmston ===
Urmston
Party	Candidate	Votes	%	±%
Conservative	Colin Warbrick*	1,515	44.0	−1.0
Labour	David Acton	1,355	39.3	+7.1
SDP	P. J. Carlon	576	16.7	−6.2
Majority		160	4.6	+0.1
Turnout		3,446	44.0	−6.2
Conservative hold		Swing		

=== Village ===
Village
Party	Candidate	Votes	%	±%
Liberal	Ray Bowker*	2,039	48.5	+13.4
Conservative	J. F. Burke	1,320	31.4	−6.7
Labour	E. A. Starkey	847	20.1	−6.7
Majority		719	17.1	+14.1
Turnout		4,206	49.7	−2.1
Liberal hold		Swing		

== By-elections between 1984 and 1986 ==
Flixton By-Election 23 May 1985
Party	Candidate	Votes	%	±%
Liberal	J. E. Parry	1,608	40.5	+2.1
Conservative	A. M. Durbin	1,213	30.6	−6.9
Labour	M. J. Goggins	1,146	28.9	+4.8
Majority		395	10.0	+9.1
Turnout		3,967	49.4	+2.2
Liberal hold		Swing		

Altrincham By-Election 6 March 1986
Party	Candidate	Votes	%	±%
Labour	J. F. L. Wood	1,150	38.2	−0.6
Conservative	S. M. A. O'Beirne	983	32.7	−10.9
SDP	B. M. Keeley-Huggett	793	26.4	+26.4
Green	N. J. Eadie	81	2.7	+1.1
Majority		167	5.6	+0.8
Turnout		3,007	37.4	−11.9
Labour gain from Conservative		Swing		

Urmston By-Election 6 March 1986
Party	Candidate	Votes	%	±%
Labour	D. Acton	1,321	44.7	+5.4
Conservative	E. May	871	29.5	−14.5
SDP	P. J. Carlon	762	25.8	+9.1
Majority		450	15.2	+10.6
Turnout		2,954	37.1	−6.9
Labour gain from Conservative		Swing		
