= Flixton (ward) =

Electoral ward of Trafford, Greater Manchester, England

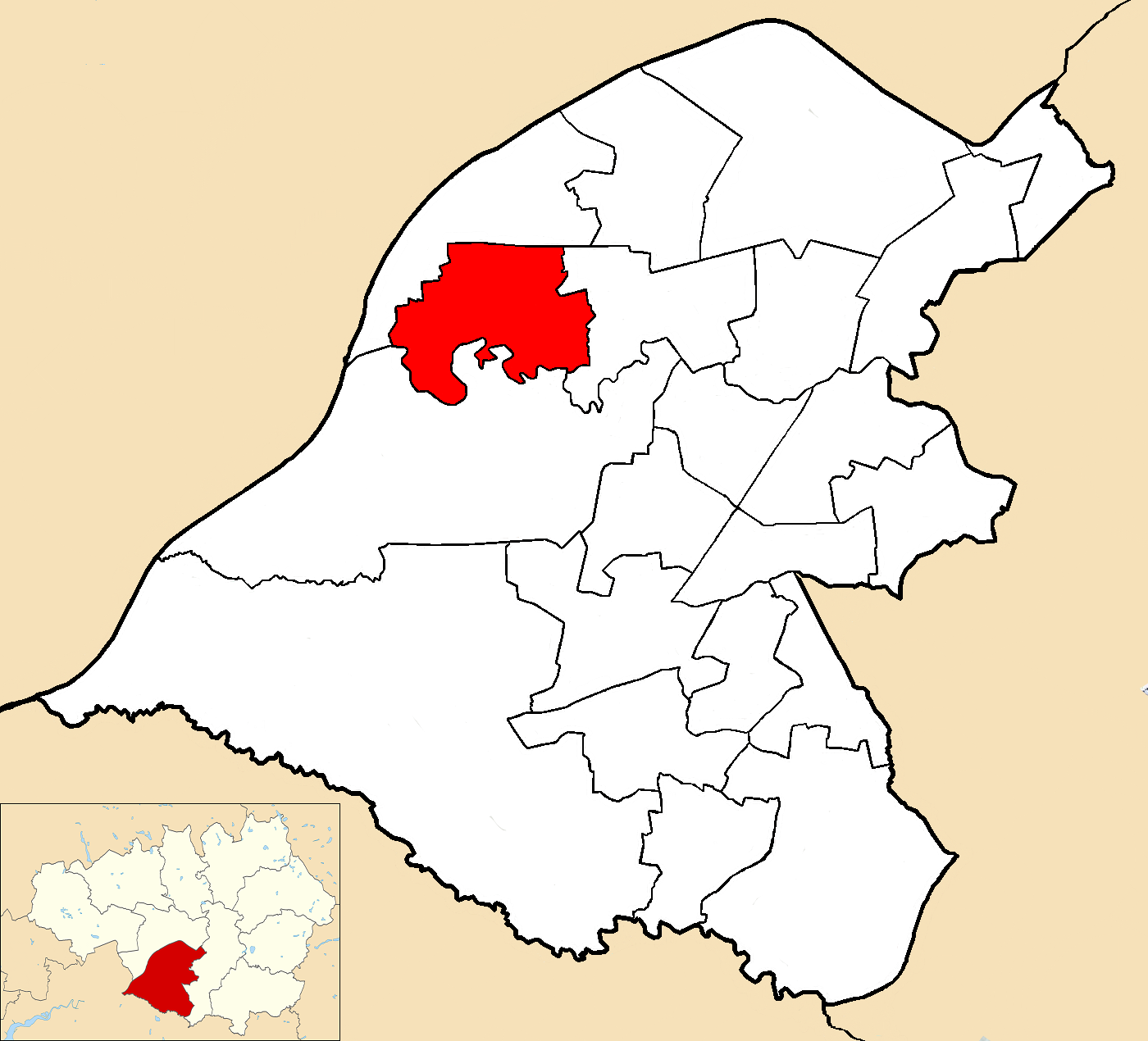
- Flixton within Trafford
- Population: 10,828
- Metropolitan borough: Trafford
- Metropolitan county: Greater Manchester
- Country: England
- Sovereign state: United Kingdom
- UK Parliament: Stretford and Urmston
- Councillors: Simon Thomas (Labour); Dolores O'Sullivan (Labour); Ged Carter (Labour)

Flixton is an electoral ward of Trafford, Greater Manchester, covering most of the village of Flixton.

== Councillors ==
Since 2022, the councillors are Simon Thomas (Labour), Dolores O'Sullivan (Labour), and Ged Carter (Labour).

Election	Councillor	Councillor	Councillor
1973	William Wroe (Con)	Neil Fitzpatrick (Con)	Gordon Lumby (Con)
1975	William Wroe (Con)	Neil Fitzpatrick (Con)	Gordon Lumby (Con)
1976	William Wroe (Con)	Neil Fitzpatrick (Con)	Gordon Lumby (Con)
1978	William Wroe (Con)	Neil Fitzpatrick (Con)	Gordon Lumby (Con)
1979	William Wroe (Con)	Neil Fitzpatrick (Con)	Gordon Lumby (Con)
1980	William Wroe (Con)	Neil Fitzpatrick (Con)	Gordon Lumby (Con)
Jul 1981	William Wroe (Con)	Neil Fitzpatrick (Con)	D. Earl (Lib)
1982	C. Lord (Con)	Neil Fitzpatrick (Con)	D. Earl (Lib)
1983	C. Lord (Con)	Neil Fitzpatrick (Con)	D. Earl (Lib)
1984	C. Lord (Con)	Alan Vernon (Lib)	D. Earl (Lib)
May 1985	C. Lord (Con)	Alan Vernon (Lib)	J. Parry (Lib)
1986	Beverley Hughes (Lab)	Alan Vernon (Lib)	J. Parry (Lib)
1987	Beverley Hughes (Lab)	Alan Vernon (Lib)	Allan Coupe (Con)
1988	Beverley Hughes (Lab)	Ron Robinson (Con)	Allan Coupe (Con)
1990	Roy Seddon (Con)	Ron Robinson (Con)	Allan Coupe (Con)
1991	Roy Seddon (Con)	Ron Robinson (Con)	J. Graham (Con)
1992	Roy Seddon (Con)	Viv Ward (Con)	J. Graham (Con)
1994	Roy Seddon (Con)	Viv Ward (Con)	J. Graham (Con)
1995	Roy Seddon (Con)	Viv Ward (Con)	A. Jones (Lab)
1996	Roy Seddon (Con)	Viv Ward (Con)	A. Jones (Lab)
1998	Roy Seddon (Con)	Viv Ward (Con)	A. Jones (Lab)
1999	Roy Seddon (Con)	Viv Ward (Con)	Jonathan Coupe (Con)
2000	Roy Seddon (Con)	Viv Ward (Con)	Jonathan Coupe (Con)
2002	Keith Summerfield (Con)	Viv Ward (Con)	Jonathan Coupe (Con)
2003	Keith Summerfield (Con)	Viv Ward (Con)	Jonathan Coupe (Con)
2004	Keith Summerfield (Con)	Jonathan Coupe (Con)	Viv Ward (Con)
2006	Keith Summerfield (Con)	Jonathan Coupe (Con)	Viv Ward (Con)
2007	Keith Summerfield (Con)	Jonathan Coupe (Con)	Viv Ward (Con)
2008	Keith Summerfield (Con)	Jonathan Coupe (Con)	Viv Ward (Con)
2010	Keith Summerfield (Con)	Jonathan Coupe (Con)	Viv Ward (Con)
2011	Keith Summerfield (Con)	Jonathan Coupe (Con)	Viv Ward (Con)
2012	Paul Lally (Con)	Jonathan Coupe (Con)	Viv Ward (Con)
2014	Paul Lally (Con)	Jonathan Coupe (Con)	Viv Ward (Con)
2015	Paul Lally (Con)	Jonathan Coupe (Con)	Viv Ward (Con)
2016	Paul Lally (Con)	Jonathan Coupe (Con)	Viv Ward (Con)
2018	Paul Lally (Con)	Jonathan Coupe (Con)	Simon Thomas (Lab)
2019	Paul Lally (Con)	Shirley Procter (Lab)	Simon Thomas (Lab)
2021	Ged Carter (Lab)	Dolores O'Sullivan (Lab)	Simon Thomas (Lab)
2022	Ged Carter (Lab)	Dolores O'Sullivan (Lab)	Simon Thomas (Lab)
2023	Ged Carter (Lab)	Dolores O'Sullivan (Lab)	Simon Thomas (Lab)
2024	Ged Carter (Lab)	Dolores O'Sullivan (Lab)	Simon Thomas (Lab)

indicates seat up for re-election. indicates seat up for election following resignation of sitting councillor.

== Elections in the 2020s ==
=== May 2026 ===
2026
Party	Candidate	Votes	%	±%
Labour	Dolores O'Sullivan*	1,314	29.6	−26.7
Reform	Mark Ormiston	1,291	29.1	N/A
Green	Katrin Cotter	812	18.3	+5.9
Conservative	Paul Lally	746	16.8	−4.2
Liberal Democrats	Timothy Kinsella	241	5.4	+1.6
Advance UK	Andrew Beaumont	32	0.7	N/A
Majority		23	0.5	−34.9
Rejected ballots		9	0.2	-0.7
Turnout		4,445	51.6	+11.4
Registered electors		8,616		
Labour hold		Swing		

=== May 2024 ===
2024
Party	Candidate	Votes	%	±%
Labour	Simon Thomas*	1,936	56.3	−2.5
Conservative	John Lijo	718	20.9	−5.3
Green	Katrin Cotter	425	12.4	−0.3
Independent	Paul Regan	200	5.8	N/A
Liberal Democrats	Kirsty Cullen	132	3.8	−1.9
Majority		1,218	35.4	+9.7
Rejected ballots		30	0.9	-0.3
Turnout		3,441	40.2	+1.8
Registered electors		8,564		
Labour hold		Swing	+1.4	

=== May 2023 ===
2023 (3)
Party	Candidate	Votes	%	±%
Labour	Ged Carter*	1,927	58.8%	
Labour	Dolores O'Sullivan*	1,750	53.4%	
Labour	Simon Thomas*	1,703	51.9%	
Conservative	Paul Lally	858	26.2%	
Conservative	Michelle McGrath	697	21.3%	
Conservative	Susan Taylor	688	21.0%	
Green	Katrin Cotter	412	12.7%	
Green	Timothy Woodward	345	10.5%	
Green	Alison Cavanagh	298	9.1%	
Liberal Democrats	Timothy Kinsella	187	5.7%	
Majority				
Rejected ballots		40	1.2%	
Turnout		3,280	38.4%	
Registered electors		8,532		

=== May 2022 ===
2022
Party	Candidate	Votes	%	±%
Labour	Simon Thomas*	2,152	59.4	
Conservative	Jonathan Coupe	1,051	29.0	
Green	Katrin Cotter	285	7.9	
Liberal Democrats	Mark Campion	117	3.2	
Majority		1,101	30.0	
Registered electors		8,266		
Turnout		3,622	43.8	
Labour hold		Swing		

=== May 2021 ===
2021
Party	Candidate	Votes	%	±%
Labour	Ged Carter	2,202	53.9	N/A
Labour	Dolores O'Sullivan	1,900	46.5	N/A
Conservative	Susan Taylor	1,293	31.6	N/A
Conservative	Gary Towers	871	21.3	N/A
Green	Katrin Cotter	399	9.8	N/A
Green	Alison Cavanagh	280	6.8	N/A
Liberal Democrats	Timothy Kinsella	179	4.4	N/A
Liberal Democrats	Norman Sutherland	110	2.7	N/A
UKIP	Paul Swansborough	75	1.8	N/A
Majority		N/A		
Rejected ballots		14		
Registered electors		8,383		
Turnout		4,089	48.8	N/A
Labour gain from Conservative		Swing	N/A	
Labour hold		Swing	N/A	

== Elections in the 2010s ==
=== May 2019 ===
2019
Party	Candidate	Votes	%	±%
Labour	Shirley Procter	2,203	58.4	▼1.5
Conservative	Jonathan Coupe*	915	24.2	▼9.3
UKIP	James Cook	287	7.6	▲5.6
Green	Tim Woodward	217	5.7	▲3.0
Liberal Democrats	Ian Sutherland	152	4.0	▲2.2
Majority		1,288	34.2	▲7.8
Registered electors		8,322		
Turnout		3,774	45.51	▼9.49
Labour gain from Conservative		Swing		

=== May 2018 ===
2018
Party	Candidate	Votes	%	±%
Labour	Simon Thomas	2,732	59.9	+20.1
Conservative	Viv Ward*	1,528	33.5	−7.9
Green	Christine McLaughlin	125	2.7	−1.7
UKIP	Andrew Beaumont	91	2.0	−9.9
Liberal Democrats	Ian Sutherland	84	1.8	−0.7
Majority		1,204	26.4	+24.7
Turnout		4,560	55.0	+5.9
Labour gain from Conservative		Swing		

=== May 2016 ===
2016
Party	Candidate	Votes	%	±%
Conservative	Paul Lally*	1,475	41.4	−4.7
Labour	Simon Thomas	1,415	39.8	−3.5
UKIP	Michael Bayley-Sanderson	422	11.9	+11.9
Green	Christine McLaughlin	157	4.4	−3.0
Liberal Democrats	David Martin	90	2.5	−0.8
Majority		60	1.7	−1.1
Turnout		3,559	44.1	−28.5
Conservative hold		Swing		

=== May 2015 ===
2015
Party	Candidate	Votes	%	±%
Conservative	Jonathan Coupe*	2,753	46.1	+7.5
Labour	Ged Carter	2,586	43.3	+5.8
Green	Alison Cavanagh	440	7.4	+2.4
Liberal Democrats	Wayne Harrison	197	3.3	+1.0
Majority		167	2.8	+1.7
Turnout		5,976	72.6	+28.8
Conservative hold		Swing		

=== May 2014 ===
2014
Party	Candidate	Votes	%	±%
Conservative	Viv Ward*	1,427	38.6	−7.7
Labour	Ged Carter	1,388	37.5	−4.1
UKIP	Chris Frost	610	16.5	+16.5
Green	Alison Cavanagh	188	5.0	−4.2
Liberal Democrats	Kirsty Cullen	86	2.3	−0.6
Majority		39	1.1	−3.6
Turnout		3,699	45.6	+5.9
Conservative hold		Swing		

=== May 2012 ===
2012
Party	Candidate	Votes	%	±%
Conservative	Paul Lally	1,481	46.3	−1.6
Labour	Freda Mottley	1,330	41.6	+1.4
Green	Alison Cavanagh	294	9.2	+1.4
Liberal Democrats	Richard Elliott	94	2.9	−1.2
Majority		151	4.7	−3.0
Turnout		3,199	39.5	−4.3
Conservative hold		Swing		

=== May 2011 ===
2011
Party	Candidate	Votes	%	±%
Conservative	Jonathan Coupe*	1,754	47.9	+4.7
Labour	Freda Mottley	1,473	40.2	+2.6
Green	Alison Cavanagh	284	7.8	+4.1
Liberal Democrats	Richard Elliott	150	4.1	−11.4
Majority		281	7.7	+2.1
Turnout		3,661	43.8	−27.0
Conservative hold		Swing		

=== May 2010 ===
2010
Party	Candidate	Votes	%	±%
Conservative	Viv Ward*	2,541	43.2	−12.4
Labour	Tom McDonald	2,214	37.6	+9.9
Liberal Democrats	Richard Elliott	915	15.5	+5.5
Green	Paul Syrett	218	3.7	−2.9
Majority		327	5.6	−22.3
Turnout		5,888	70.8	+32.6
Conservative hold		Swing		

== Elections in the 2000s ==
=== May 2008 ===
2008
Party	Candidate	Votes	%	±%
Conservative	Keith Summerfield*	1,785	55.6	+4.9
Labour	Dolores O'Sullivan	890	27.7	−4.7
Liberal Democrats	Richard Elliott	321	10.0	−0.1
Green	Paul Syrett	213	6.6	−0.2
Majority		895	27.9	+9.5
Turnout		3,209	38.2	−2.0
Conservative hold		Swing		

=== May 2007 ===
2007
Party	Candidate	Votes	%	±%
Conservative	Jonathan Coupe*	1,652	50.7	−2.7
Labour	Dolores O’Sullivan	1,054	32.4	−1.0
Liberal Democrats	Martin Elliott	330	10.1	+10.1
Green	Anne Power	220	6.8	−6.4
Majority		598	18.4	−1.6
Turnout		3,256	40.2	+1.8
Conservative hold		Swing		

=== May 2006 ===
2006
Party	Candidate	Votes	%	±%
Conservative	Viv Ward*	1,644	53.4	−3.7
Labour	Joyce Acton	1,030	33.4	−1.4
Green	Christopher Webb	406	13.2	+13.2
Majority		614	20.0	+0.4
Turnout		3,080	38.4	−10.2
Conservative hold		Swing		

=== May 2004 ===
2004 (after boundary changes)
Party	Candidate	Votes	%	±%
Conservative	Keith Summerfield*	1,952	19.4	
Conservative	Jonathan Coupe*	1,915	19.0	
Conservative	Viv Ward*	1,885	18.7	
Labour	Gerard Carter	1,227	12.2	
Labour	Dolores O'Sullivan	1,175	11.7	
Labour	Nigel Roberts	1,095	10.9	
Liberal Democrats	Alan Vernon	819	8.1	
Turnout		10,068	48.6	
Conservative win (new seat)				
Conservative win (new seat)				
Conservative win (new seat)				

=== May 2003 ===
2003
Party	Candidate	Votes	%	±%
Conservative	Jonathan Coupe*	2,130	51.0	−0.5
Labour	Karina Carter	1,652	39.5	−9.0
Independent	Paul Pickford	398	9.5	+9.5
Majority		478	11.5	+8.5
Turnout		4,180	57.1	+3.3
Conservative hold		Swing		

=== May 2002 ===
2002
Party	Candidate	Votes	%	±%
Conservative	Keith Summerfield	2,070	51.5	−9.0
Labour	Karina Carter	1,946	48.5	+8.9
Majority		124	3.0	−17.9
Turnout		4,016	53.8	+15.8
Conservative hold		Swing		

=== May 2000 ===
2000
Party	Candidate	Votes	%	±%
Conservative	Vivienne Ward*	1,755	60.5	+11.3
Labour	Jennifer Carroll	1,148	39.6	−5.6
Majority		607	20.9	+16.9
Turnout		2,903	38.0	−4.4
Conservative hold		Swing		

== Elections in the 1990s ==
1999
Party	Candidate	Votes	%	±%
Conservative	Coupe	1,603	49.2	−4.2
Labour	AS Jones*	1,473	45.2	−1.4
Liberal Democrats	Smith	181	5.6	+5.6
Majority		130	4.0	−2.8
Turnout		3,257	42.4	−0.4
Conservative gain from Labour		Swing		

1998
Party	Candidate	Votes	%	±%
Conservative	T. R. Seddon*	1,754	53.4	+10.9
Labour	M. G. H. Barker	1,532	46.6	+4.9
Majority		222	6.8	+6.0
Turnout		3,286	42.8	−3.4
Conservative hold		Swing		

1996
Party	Candidate	Votes	%	±%
Conservative	E. V. Ward*	1,534	42.5	+2.7
Labour	M. G. H. Barker	1,506	41.7	−1.9
Liberal Democrats	A. Vernon	571	15.8	−0.8
Majority		28	0.8	−3.1
Turnout		3,611	46.2	−3.4
Conservative hold		Swing		

1995
Party	Candidate	Votes	%	±%
Labour	A. S. Jones	1,688	43.6	+12.5
Conservative	M. P. Whetton	1,539	39.8	−1.0
Liberal Democrats	A. Vernon	643	16.6	−11.4
Majority		149	3.9	−5.8
Turnout		3,870	49.6	−4.1
Labour gain from Conservative		Swing		

1994
Party	Candidate	Votes	%	±%
Conservative	T. R. Seddon*	1,625	40.8	−11.4
Labour	J. D. Chapman-Barker	1,238	31.1	+6.5
Liberal Democrats	A. Vernon	1,115	28.0	+4.8
Majority		387	9.7	−18.0
Turnout		3,978	53.7	+5.1
Conservative hold		Swing		

1992
Party	Candidate	Votes	%	±%
Conservative	E. V. Ward	1,989	52.2	+8.1
Labour	G. A. Carter	936	24.6	−4.9
Liberal Democrats	A. Vernon	883	23.2	−3.2
Majority		1,053	27.7	+13.1
Turnout		3,808	48.6	+6.6
Conservative hold		Swing		

1991
Party	Candidate	Votes	%	±%
Conservative	J. G. Graham	1,881	44.1	+1.8
Labour	T. K. McDonald	1,257	29.5	−5.1
Liberal Democrats	A. Vernon	1,125	26.4	+7.3
Majority		624	14.6	+6.9
Turnout		4,263	55.2	−4.6
Conservative hold		Swing		

1990
Party	Candidate	Votes	%	±%
Conservative	T. R. Seddon	1,989	42.3	−2.3
Labour	J. Moore	1,625	34.6	+6.6
Liberal Democrats	A. Vernon	898	19.1	−8.4
Green	N. M. Smith	187	4.0	+4.0
Majority		364	7.7	−8.9
Turnout		4,699	59.8	+2.3
Conservative gain from Labour		Swing		

== Elections in the 1980s ==
1988
Party	Candidate	Votes	%	±%
Conservative	R. W. Robinson	2,052	44.6	−0.5
Labour	P. G. Dowland	1,289	28.0	+3.8
Liberal Democrats	A. Vernon*	1,265	27.5	−3.2
Majority		763	16.6	+2.3
Turnout		4,606	57.5	−5.7
Conservative gain from Liberal Democrats		Swing		

1987
Party	Candidate	Votes	%	±%
Conservative	A. R. Coupe	2,294	45.1	+11.0
Liberal	P. I. M. Crompton	1,565	30.7	−0.1
Labour	P. G. Dowland	1,231	24.2	−10.9
Majority		729	14.3	+13.2
Turnout		5,090	63.2	+10.8
Conservative gain from Liberal		Swing		

1986
Party	Candidate	Votes	%	±%
Labour	B. J. Hughes	1,477	35.1	+11.0
Conservative	C. A. Lord*	1,432	34.1	−3.4
Liberal	P. I. M. Crompton	1,293	30.8	−7.6
Majority		45	1.1	+0.2
Turnout		4,202	52.4	+0.7
Labour gain from Conservative		Swing		

By-Election 23 May 1985
Party	Candidate	Votes	%	±%
Liberal	J. E. Parry	1,608	40.5	+2.1
Conservative	A. M. Durbin	1,213	30.6	−6.9
Labour	M. J. Goggins	1,146	28.9	+4.8
Majority		395	10.0	+9.1
Turnout		3,967	49.4	+2.2
Liberal hold		Swing		

1984
Party	Candidate	Votes	%	±%
Liberal	A. Vernon	1,590	38.4	−3.4
Conservative	N. J. Fitzpatrick*	1,551	37.5	−2.8
Labour	M. J. Goggins	996	24.1	+6.2
Majority		39	0.9	−0.6
Turnout		4,137	51.7	−4.3
Liberal gain from Conservative		Swing		

1983
Party	Candidate	Votes	%	±%
Alliance	D. E. Earl*	1,885	41.8	+3.8
Conservative	P. Schofield	1,819	40.3	−4.2
Labour	G. Woodburn	807	17.9	+0.5
Majority		66	1.5	−5.0
Turnout		4,511	56.0	+3.5
Alliance hold		Swing		

1982
Party	Candidate	Votes	%	±%
Conservative	C. A. Lord	1,856	44.5	+6.3
Liberal	A. Vernon	1,585	38.0	+5.8
Labour	H. Pollard	726	17.4	−16.5
Majority		271	6.5	+2.2
Turnout		4,167	52.5	+3.7
Conservative hold		Swing		

By-Election 9 July 1981
Party	Candidate	Votes	%	±%
Liberal	D. E. Earl	1,400	40.1	+9.2
Conservative	P. Schofield	1,199	34.3	−2.3
Labour	R. A. Tully	895	25.6	−6.9
Majority		201	5.8	−1.7
Turnout		3,494	44.4	−4.4
Liberal gain from Conservative		Swing		

1980
Party	Candidate	Votes	%	±%
Conservative	N. J. Fitzpatrick*	1,403	38.2	−15.1
Labour	J. D. Brown	1,245	33.9	+3.5
Liberal	D. E. Earl	1,183	32.2	+15.9
Majority		158	4.3	−18.6
Turnout		3,673	48.8	−32.1
Conservative hold		Swing		

== Elections in the 1970s ==
1979
Party	Candidate	Votes	%	±%
Conservative	G. B. W. Lumby*	4,023	53.3	−18.8
Labour	J. D. Brown	2,295	30.4	+2.5
Liberal	R. K. Sangster	1,226	16.3	+16.3
Majority		1,728	22.9	−21.3
Turnout		7,544	80.9	+47.7
Conservative hold		Swing		

1978
Party	Candidate	Votes	%	±%
Conservative	W. Wroe*	2,205	72.1	+9.2
Labour	J. Shaw	853	27.9	+5.3
Majority		1,352	44.2	+3.9
Turnout		3,058	33.2	−9.7
Conservative hold		Swing		

1976
Party	Candidate	Votes	%	±%
Conservative	N. J. Fitzpatrick*	2,492	62.9	+8.4
Labour	D. J. Watts	894	22.6	+3.0
Liberal	M. G. Maxfield	575	14.5	−11.4
Majority		1,598	40.3	+11.7
Turnout		3,961	42.9	−4.7
Conservative hold		Swing		

1975
Party	Candidate	Votes	%	±%
Conservative	G. B. W. Lumby*	2,363	54.5	
Liberal	D. J. Gilbert	1,123	25.9	
Labour	C. Nightingale	851	19.6	
Majority		1,240	28.6	
Turnout		4,337	47.6	
Conservative hold		Swing		

1973
Party	Candidate	Votes	%	±%
Conservative	W. Wroe	1,877	45.2	
Conservative	N. J. Fitzpatrick	1,755		
Conservative	G. B. W. Lumby	1,737		
Liberal	N. Heywood	1,539	37.1	
Liberal	M. Willis	1,431		
Liberal	A. Hannett	1,415		
Labour	D. Hall	735	17.7	
Labour	R. Phillips	727		
Labour	K. Barnes	658		
Majority		198		
Turnout		4,151	43.1	
Conservative win (new seat)				
Conservative win (new seat)				
Conservative win (new seat)				
