= 1988 Trafford Metropolitan Borough Council election =

English local election

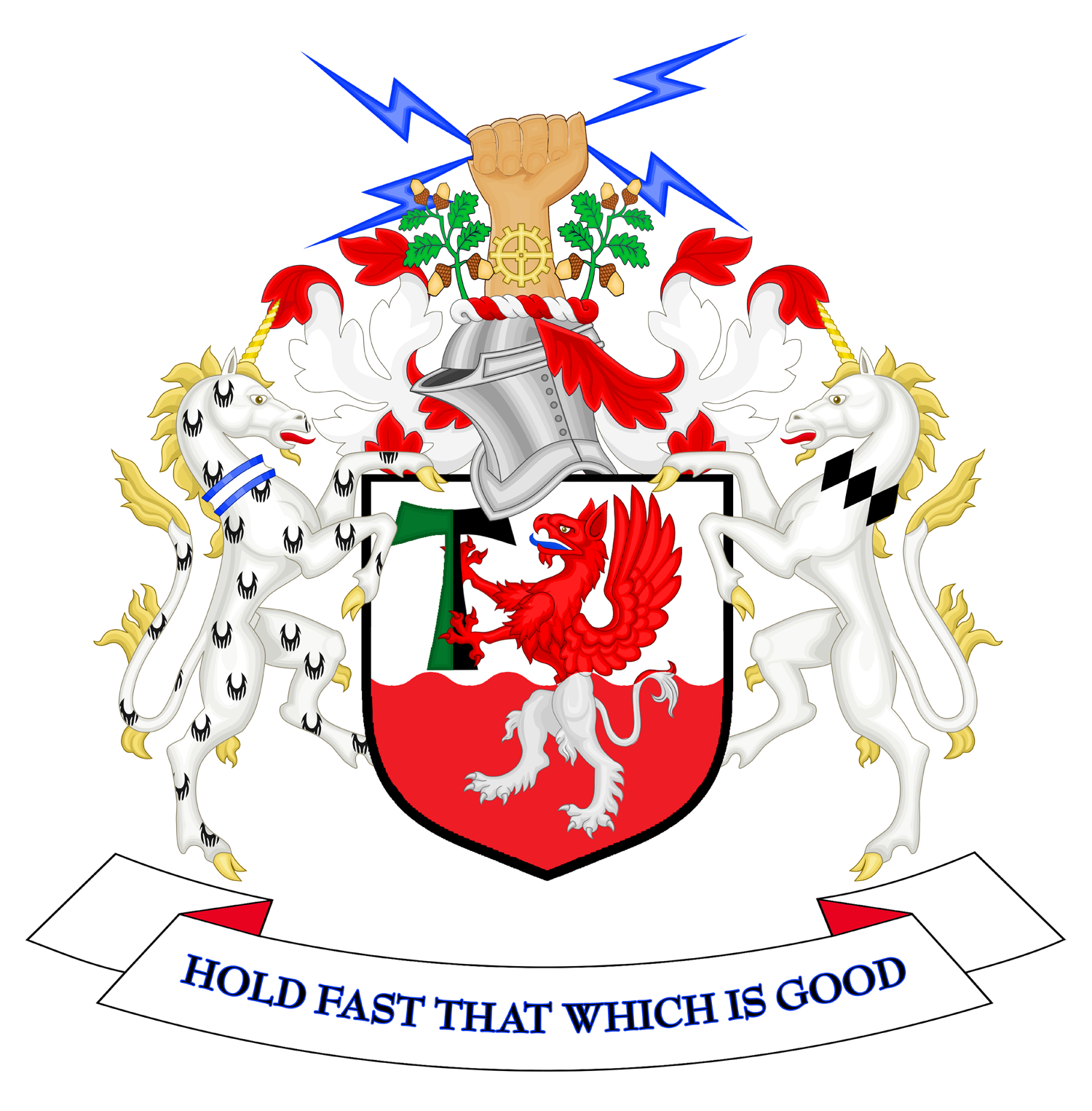
- 5 May 1988

22 of 63 seats to Trafford Metropolitan Borough Council 32 seats needed for a majority
	First party	Second party	Third party
Leader	Colin Warbrick	Barry Brotherton	John Davenport
Party	Conservative	Labour	SLD
Leader's seat	Urmston	Sale Moor	Timperley (defeated)
Last election	15 seats, 47.7%	6 seats, 30.6%	0 seats, 21.0%
Seats before	28	28	7
Seats won	13	8	1
Seats after	32	27	4
Seat change	▲4	▼1	▼3
Popular vote	39,639	29,169	11,743
Percentage	48.9%	36.0%	14.5%
Swing	▲1.2%	▲5.4%	▼6.5%
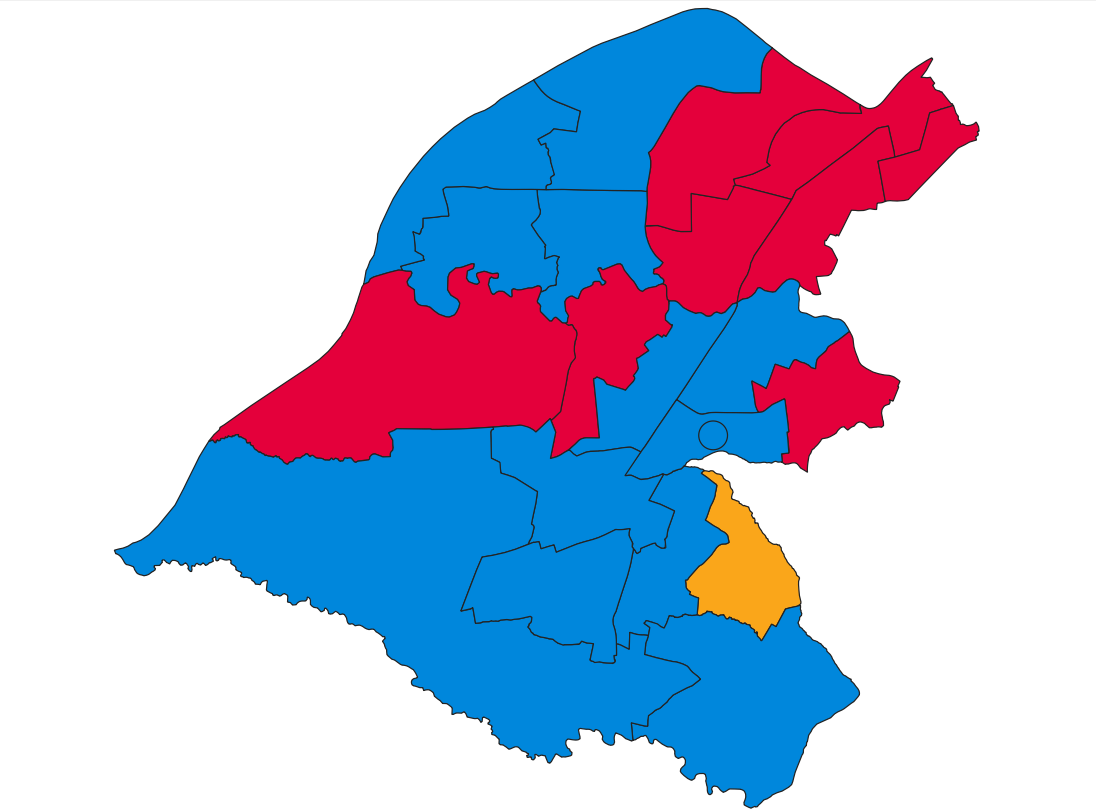
- Map of results of 1988 election
Leader of the Council before election
Barry Brotherton
Labour
Leader of the Council after election
Colin Warbrick
Conservative

Elections to Trafford Council in the United Kingdom were held on 5 May 1988. One-third of the council was up for election, with each successful candidate to serve a four-year term of office, expiring in 1992. The Conservative Party gained overall control of the council, from no overall control.

== Election result ==
Party	Votes		Seats			Full Council	
Conservative Party	39,639 (48.9%)	▲1.2	13 (59.1%)	13 / 22	▲4	32 (50.8%)	32 / 63
Labour Party	29,169 (36.0%)	▲5.4	8 (36.4%)	8 / 22	▼1	27 (42.9%)	27 / 63
SLD	11,536 (14.2%)	▼6.8	1 (4.5%)	1 / 22	▼3	4 (6.3%)	4 / 63
Green Party	494 (0.6%)	Steady	0 (0.0%)	0 / 22	Steady	0 (0.0%)	0 / 63
SDP	207 (0.3%)	N/A	0 (0.0%)	0 / 22	N/A	0 (0.0%)	0 / 63

↓
27	4	32

== Ward results ==
=== Altrincham ===
Altrincham
Party	Candidate	Votes	%	±%
Conservative	Sheila O'Beirne	1,934	49.0	−2.7
Labour	David Hinder	1,516	38.4	+6.4
SLD	John Mulholland	498	12.6	−3.7
Majority		418	10.6	−9.1
Turnout		3,948	46.6	−2.9
Conservative gain from Labour		Swing		

=== Bowdon ===
Bowdon
Party	Candidate	Votes	%	±%
Conservative	David Merrell	2,790	70.8	+2.6
SLD	Vivian Plummer	535	13.6	−6.7
Labour	Bernardette Feeney	474	12.0	+3.4
Green	Mark Rowtham	139	3.5	+0.6
Majority		2,255	57.3	+9.3
Turnout		3,938	43.0	−7.6
Conservative hold		Swing		

=== Broadheath ===
Broadheath
Party	Candidate	Votes	%	±%
Conservative	Michael Barltrop*	2,084	51.9	+2.7
Labour	Jane Baugh	1,472	36.7	+8.0
SLD	Frank Cameron	459	11.4	−10.6
Majority		612	15.2	−5.3
Turnout		4,015	46.3	−5.5
Conservative hold		Swing		

=== Brooklands ===
Brooklands (2 Councillors)
Party	Candidate	Votes	%	±%
Conservative	Rita Barber*	2,630	70.3	+12.0
Conservative	Margaret Cox	2,528	67.6	+9.3
SLD	Colin Bearfield	630	16.8	−14.6
SLD	Kenneth Humber	579	15.5	−15.9
Labour	Liam Hargadon	565	15.1	+4.8
Labour	Eric Shaw	543	14.5	+4.2
Majority		1,898	50.7	+23.9
Turnout		3,740	48.1	−8.6
Conservative hold		Swing		
Conservative hold		Swing		

=== Bucklow ===
Bucklow
Party	Candidate	Votes	%	±%
Labour	John Paul*	1,456	79.5	+16.4
SLD	Martin Elliott	376	20.5	+6.4
Majority		1,080	59.0	+18.7
Turnout		1,832	27.3	−11.2
Labour hold		Swing		

=== Clifford ===
Clifford
Party	Candidate	Votes	%	±%
Labour	Sean Rogers*	2,379	74.8	+2.4
Conservative	Mary Wynn	800	25.2	−2.4
Majority		1,579	49.7	+4.8
Turnout		3,179	37.8	−0.9
Labour hold		Swing		

=== Davyhulme East ===
Davyhulme East
Party	Candidate	Votes	%	±%
Conservative	Frank Eadie*	2,108	61.5	+4.9
Labour	Freda Mottley	1,022	29.8	+1.4
SLD	Colin Hedley	296	8.6	−6.4
Majority		1,086	31.7	+3.5
Turnout		3,426	44.1	−10.2
Conservative hold		Swing		

=== Davyhulme West ===
Davyhulme West
Party	Candidate	Votes	%	±%
Conservative	John Ackerley	2,117	50.1	+1.5
Labour	Laura Seex*	1,818	43.0	+11.7
SLD	David Martin	291	6.9	−13.2
Majority		299	7.1	−10.2
Turnout		4,226	51.5	−5.0
Conservative gain from Labour		Swing		

=== Flixton ===
Flixton
Party	Candidate	Votes	%	±%
Conservative	Roland Robinson	2,052	44.6	−0.5
Labour	Philip Dowland	1,289	28.0	+3.8
SLD	Alan Vernon*	1,265	27.5	−3.2
Majority		763	16.6	+2.3
Turnout		4,606	57.5	−5.7
Conservative gain from SLD		Swing		

=== Hale ===
Hale
Party	Candidate	Votes	%	±%
Conservative	Roy Godwin*	2,930	76.4	+5.8
SLD	Gillian Pawson	481	12.5	−9.3
Labour	Rosemary Adams	314	8.2	+2.4
Green	John Wharton	112	2.9	+1.0
Majority		2,449	63.8	+14.9
Turnout		3,837	43.5	−9.7
Conservative hold		Swing		

=== Longford ===
Longford
Party	Candidate	Votes	%	±%
Labour	Mary Ryan	1,934	54.7	+11.7
Conservative	Shirley Dirikis	1,604	45.3	−0.5
Majority		330	9.3	+6.5
Turnout		3,538	47.4	−5.3
Labour hold		Swing		

=== Mersey-St. Mary's ===
Mersey St. Marys
Party	Candidate	Votes	%	±%
Conservative	David Silverman*	2,613	60.5	+1.2
Labour	Peter Miller	1,017	23.6	+6.3
SLD	Ray Thompson	687	15.9	−7.4
Majority		1,596	37.0	+1.0
Turnout		4,317	45.0	−5.0
Conservative hold		Swing		

=== Park ===
Park
Party	Candidate	Votes	%	±%
Labour	Philip Morgan	1,521	57.7	+13.9
Conservative	David Meadowcroft	942	35.7	−3.1
SLD	Francis Beswick	174	6.6	−10.8
Majority		579	22.0	+17.0
Turnout		2,637	43.3	−2.6
Labour hold		Swing		

=== Priory ===
Priory
Party	Candidate	Votes	%	±%
Conservative	John Flynn	1,426	38.2	+0.2
SLD	John Golding*	1,190	31.9	−3.5
Labour	Robin Joinson	1,113	29.8	+3.2
Majority		236	6.3	+3.7
Turnout		3,729	45.8	−5.8
Conservative gain from SLD		Swing		

=== Sale Moor ===
Sale Moor
Party	Candidate	Votes	%	±%
Labour	Barry Brotherton*	1,679	46.8	+7.8
Conservative	Graham Burrows	1,526	42.5	+6.4
SLD	John Hunter	386	10.7	−12.4
Majority		153	4.3	+1.5
Turnout		3,591	45.4	−3.1
Labour hold		Swing		

=== St. Martin's ===
St. Martins
Party	Candidate	Votes	%	±%
Labour	Paul English	2,030	51.8	+7.6
Conservative	Robert Maley	1,471	37.6	+0.3
SLD	Terence Corbett	334	8.5	−7.7
Green	John Bowden	82	2.1	−0.2
Majority		559	14.3	+7.4
Turnout		3,917	41.3	−6.4
Labour hold		Swing		

=== Stretford ===
Stretford
Party	Candidate	Votes	%	±%
Labour	Terry Beer	1,872	47.9	+10.0
Conservative	Frank Redfern*	1,826	46.8	−2.0
SDP	Lesley Sumner	207	5.3	−8.0
Majority		46	1.2	−9.7
Turnout		3,905	47.8	−3.1
Labour gain from Conservative		Swing		

=== Talbot ===
Talbot
Party	Candidate	Votes	%	±%
Labour	Larry Sullivan*	1,775	70.8	+9.1
Conservative	Colin Levenston	731	29.2	−6.9
Majority		1,044	41.7	+16.1
Turnout		2,506	34.8	−5.0
Labour hold		Swing		

=== Timperley ===
Timperley
Party	Candidate	Votes	%	±%
Conservative	Ken Davies	2,075	50.1	+1.3
SLD	John Davenport*	1,242	30.0	−5.6
Labour	Mary Atherton	726	17.5	+3.6
Green	Keith Robinson	97	2.3	+0.2
Majority		833	20.1	+6.9
Turnout		4,140	46.5	−7.1
Conservative gain from SLD		Swing		

=== Urmston ===
Urmston
Party	Candidate	Votes	%	±%
Conservative	Colin Warbrick*	1,913	47.2	−1.0
Labour	David Acton	1,847	45.5	+5.9
SLD	Peter Carlon	295	7.3	−7.9
Majority		66	1.6	−6.9
Turnout		4,055	50.9	−4.9
Conservative hold		Swing		

=== Village ===
Village
Party	Candidate	Votes	%	±%
SLD	Ray Bowker*	1,818	43.1	+5.1
Conservative	Robert Walsh	1,539	36.5	−4.5
Labour	David Holland	799	18.9	−1.0
Green	Erica Wright	64	1.5	+0.3
Majority		279	6.6	+3.6
Turnout		4,220	49.9	−4.1
SLD hold		Swing		

== By-elections between 1988 and 1990 ==
Urmston By-Election 24 November 1988
Party	Candidate	Votes	%	±%
Labour	D. Acton	1,563	52.6	+7.1
Conservative	J. G. Graham	1,406	47.4	+0.2
Majority		157	5.3	+3.7
Turnout		2,969	37.2	+14.3
Labour hold		Swing		

Bowdon By-Election 15 June 1989
Party	Candidate	Votes	%	±%
Conservative	M. C. Harney	2,582	59.6	−11.2
Labour	H. F. Busteed	674	15.6	+3.6
SLD	G. P. Pawson	567	13.1	−0.5
Green	M. R. Rowtham	506	11.7	+8.2
Majority		1,908	44.1	+3
Turnout		4,329	47.3	+14.3
Conservative hold		Swing		
