= 1983 Trafford Metropolitan Borough Council election =

1983 UK local government election

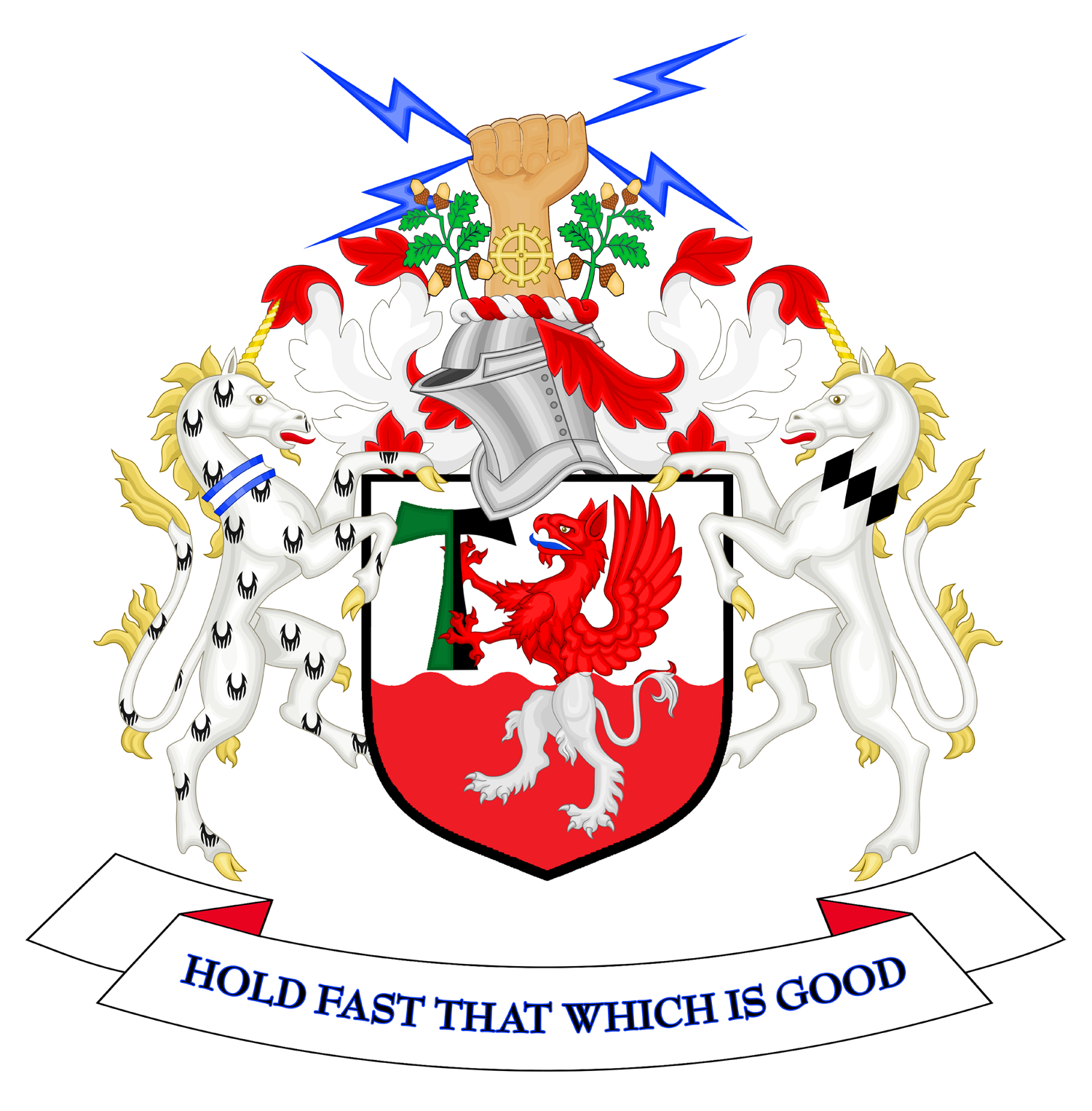
- 5 May 1983

22 of 63 seats to Trafford Metropolitan Borough Council 32 seats needed for a majority
	First party	Second party	Third party
Leader	Mike King	Richard Mee	John Phillipson
Party	Conservative	Labour	Alliance
Leader's seat	St. Martin's	Sale Moor	Priory
Last election	15 seats, 46.1%	5 seats, 26.4%	2 seats, 27.5%
Seats before	34	22	7
Seats won	14	6	2
Seats after	36	21	6
Seat change	▲2	▼1	▼1
Popular vote	37,733	26,819	19,156
Percentage	45.1%	32.0%	22.9%
Swing	▼1.0%	▲5.6%	▼4.6%
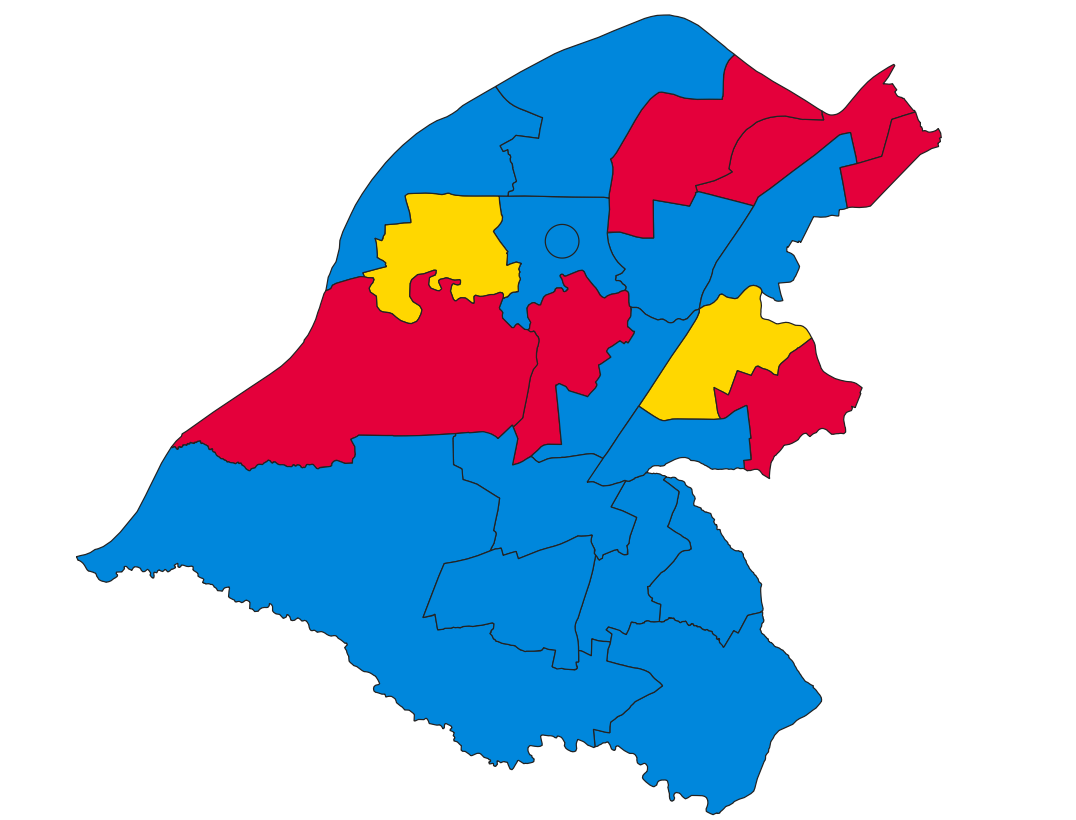
- Map of results of 1983 election
Leader of the Council before election
Mike King
Conservative
Leader of the Council after election
Mike King
Conservative

Elections to Trafford Council were held on Thursday, 5 May 1983. One third of the council was up for election, with each successful candidate to serve a four-year term of office, expiring in 1987. The Conservative Party retained overall control of the council.

== Election result ==
Party	Votes		Seats			Full Council	
Conservative Party	37,733 (45.1%)	▼1.0	14 (63.6%)	14 / 22	▲2	36 (57.1%)	36 / 63
Labour Party	26,819 (32.0%)	▲5.6	6 (27.3%)	6 / 22	▼1	21 (33.3%)	21 / 63
Alliance	19,156 (22.9%)	▼4.6	2 (9.1%)	2 / 22	▼1	6 (9.5%)	6 / 63

↓
21	6	36

== Ward results ==
=== Altrincham ===
Altrincham
Party	Candidate	Votes	%	±%
Conservative	C. S. Gordon*	1,662	49.3	+0.4
Labour	P. A. Baldwinson	1,087	32.2	+8.1
Alliance	G. E. Evans	622	18.5	−8.5
Majority		575	17.1	−4.8
Turnout		3,371	41.2	−0.4
Conservative hold		Swing		

=== Bowdon ===
Bowdon
Party	Candidate	Votes	%	±%
Conservative	G. Barker	2,956	67.9	+5.4
Alliance	A. P. Ratcliff	920	21.1	−9.2
Labour	J. A. Schoua	479	11.0	+3.8
Majority		2,036	46.8	+14.6
Turnout		4,355	49.6	+0.2
Conservative hold		Swing		

=== Broadheath ===
Broadheath
Party	Candidate	Votes	%	±%
Conservative	L. M. L. Burton*	1,833	48.8	+4.1
Labour	R. J. Short	1,187	31.6	+4.0
Alliance	D. E. Armstrong	736	19.6	−8.1
Majority		646	17.2	+0.2
Turnout		3,756	46.5	+0.7
Conservative hold		Swing		

=== Brooklands ===
Brooklands
Party	Candidate	Votes	%	±%
Conservative	J. Taylor*	2,630	63.3	−0.1
Liberal	G. M. R. Willmott	1,029	24.8	−0.7
Labour	R. P. F. Phillips	497	12.0	+0.9
Majority		1,601	38.5	+0.6
Turnout		4,156	51.6	+2.5
Conservative hold		Swing		

=== Bucklow ===
Bucklow
Party	Candidate	Votes	%	±%
Labour	K. Rogers*	1,738	67.9	+5.2
Conservative	M. E. Hindley	532	20.8	+1.1
Alliance	A. C. Halliday	289	11.3	−6.3
Majority		1,206	47.1	+4.1
Turnout		2,559	37.0	+2.2
Labour hold		Swing		

=== Clifford ===
Clifford
Party	Candidate	Votes	%	±%
Labour	J. S. Maher*	2,141	58.5	+4.7
Conservative	G. V. Burrows	1,140	31.1	−0.2
Alliance	W. C. Sumner	379	10.4	−4.5
Majority		1,001	27.3	+4.7
Turnout		3,660	43.3	+2.4
Labour hold		Swing		

=== Davyhulme East ===
Davyhulme East
Party	Candidate	Votes	%	±%
Conservative	R. E. Crosbie*	1,852	44.7	−1.2
Labour	S. Rogers	1,407	33.9	+3.7
Alliance	A. Vernon	888	21.4	−2.5
Majority		445	10.7	−4.9
Turnout		4,147	54.3	+3.2
Conservative hold		Swing		

=== Davyhulme West ===
Davyhulme West
Party	Candidate	Votes	%	±%
Conservative	B. M. Dirikis	1,950	45.4	+0.5
Labour	L. M. Seex*	1,805	42.0	+12.6
SDP	K. W. Bower	539	12.6	−13.1
Majority		145	3.4	−12.0
Turnout		4,294	51.1	+3.6
Conservative gain from Labour		Swing		

=== Flixton ===
Flixton
Party	Candidate	Votes	%	±%
Alliance	D. E. Earl*	1,885	41.8	+3.8
Conservative	P. Schofield	1,819	40.3	−4.2
Labour	G. Woodburn	807	17.9	+0.5
Majority		66	1.5	−5.0
Turnout		4,511	56.0	+3.5
Alliance hold		Swing		

=== Hale ===
Hale
Party	Candidate	Votes	%	±%
Conservative	N. W. Barrett*	2,444	69.2	+3.1
Alliance	H. E. Bayliss	991	23.0	−4.7
Labour	K. O'Hagan	337	7.8	+1.6
Majority		1,994	46.2	+7.7
Turnout		4,313	48.4	+1.8
Conservative hold		Swing		

=== Longford ===
Longford
Party	Candidate	Votes	%	±%
Conservative	A. Kelly*	1,724	45.9	+0.5
Labour	K. Silcock	1,666	44.4	+3.2
Alliance	M. L. Kugler	363	9.7	−3.7
Majority		58	1.5	−2.7
Turnout		3,753	49.1	+2.9
Conservative hold		Swing		

=== Mersey-St. Mary's ===
Mersey St. Marys
Party	Candidate	Votes	%	±%
Conservative	R. P. Bannister*	2,631	59.7	−2.6
Alliance	J. B. Weightman	1,185	26.9	+2.0
Labour	N. J. Bentham	592	13.4	+0.6
Majority		1,446	32.8	−4.6
Turnout		4,408	46.5	+4.1
Conservative hold		Swing		

=== Park ===
Park
Party	Candidate	Votes	%	±%
Labour	R. A. Tully	1,435	49.3	+7.8
Conservative	D. Meadowcroft	1,097	37.7	−1.9
Alliance	C. R. Hedley	377	13.0	−5.9
Majority		338	11.6	+9.7
Turnout		2,909	45.7	+7.2
Labour hold		Swing		

=== Priory ===
Priory
Party	Candidate	Votes	%	±%
Alliance	J. M. Phillipson*	1,670	46.7	+2.8
Conservative	G. N. Beck	1,279	35.7	−5.3
Labour	N. P. J. Cowell	629	17.6	+2.5
Majority		391	10.9	+8.0
Turnout		3,578	45.1	+5.5
Alliance hold		Swing		

=== Sale Moor ===
Sale Moor
Party	Candidate	Votes	%	±%
Labour	C. H. Merry*	1,488	40.5	+0.5
Conservative	J. W. Robinson	1,290	35.1	+0.2
Alliance	R. C. Tweed	892	24.3	−0.8
Majority		198	5.4	+0.3
Turnout		3,670	46.7	+4.4
Labour hold		Swing		

=== St. Martin's ===
St. Martins
Party	Candidate	Votes	%	±%
Labour	G. H. Mountain	1,987	52.6	+16.5
Conservative	S. G. Brownhill*	1,275	33.7	−9.5
Alliance	E. P. M. Wollaston	516	13.7	−7.0
Majority		712	18.8	+11.8
Turnout		3,778	44.2	+0.9
Labour gain from Conservative		Swing		

=== Stretford ===
Stretford
Party	Candidate	Votes	%	±%
Conservative	H. Walker*	1,886	47.4	−3.9
Labour	J. F. L. Wood	1,598	40.1	+9.9
Alliance	L. L. Sumner	498	12.5	−6.0
Majority		288	7.2	−14.1
Turnout		3,982	48.0	+3.4
Conservative hold		Swing		

=== Talbot ===
Talbot
Party	Candidate	Votes	%	±%
Labour	H. C. Cronshaw*	1,843	62.1	+3.5
Conservative	S. M. Dirikis	781	26.3	+0.8
Alliance	R. J. Allan	346	11.6	−4.3
Majority		1,062	35.8	+2.8
Turnout		2,970	39.6	+0.6
Labour hold		Swing		

=== Timperley ===
Timperley
Party	Candidate	Votes	%	±%
Conservative	W. J. Watkins*	2,003	45.4	−0.2
Alliance	G. K. Stuart	1,834	41.6	−1.5
Labour	R. Crewe	575	13.0	+1.8
Majority		169	3.8	+3.8
Turnout		4,412	49.1	+3.7
Conservative hold		Swing		

=== Urmston ===
Urmston (2 vacancies)
Party	Candidate	Votes	%	±%
Conservative	A. L. Brown	1,706	43.4	−3.3
Conservative	C. Warbrick	1,600	40.7	−6.0
Labour	D. Acton	1,269	32.3	+5.5
Labour	A. G. Hodson	1,095	27.8	+1.0
SDP	P. J. Carlon	867	22.0	−4.5
SDP	H. Laffey	815	20.7	−5.8
Majority		331	8.4	−11.6
Turnout		3,932	50.2	+2.7
Conservative hold		Swing		
Conservative gain from Labour		Swing		

=== Village ===
Village
Party	Candidate	Votes	%	±%
Conservative	D. Merrell	1,643	38.1	+2.2
Alliance	R. B. Slack*	1,515	35.1	−9.2
Labour	E. A. Starkey	1,157	26.8	+7.0
Majority		128	3.0	−5.4
Turnout		4,315	51.8	+8.5
Conservative gain from Liberal		Swing		
