= Altrincham (ward) =

Electoral ward of Trafford, England

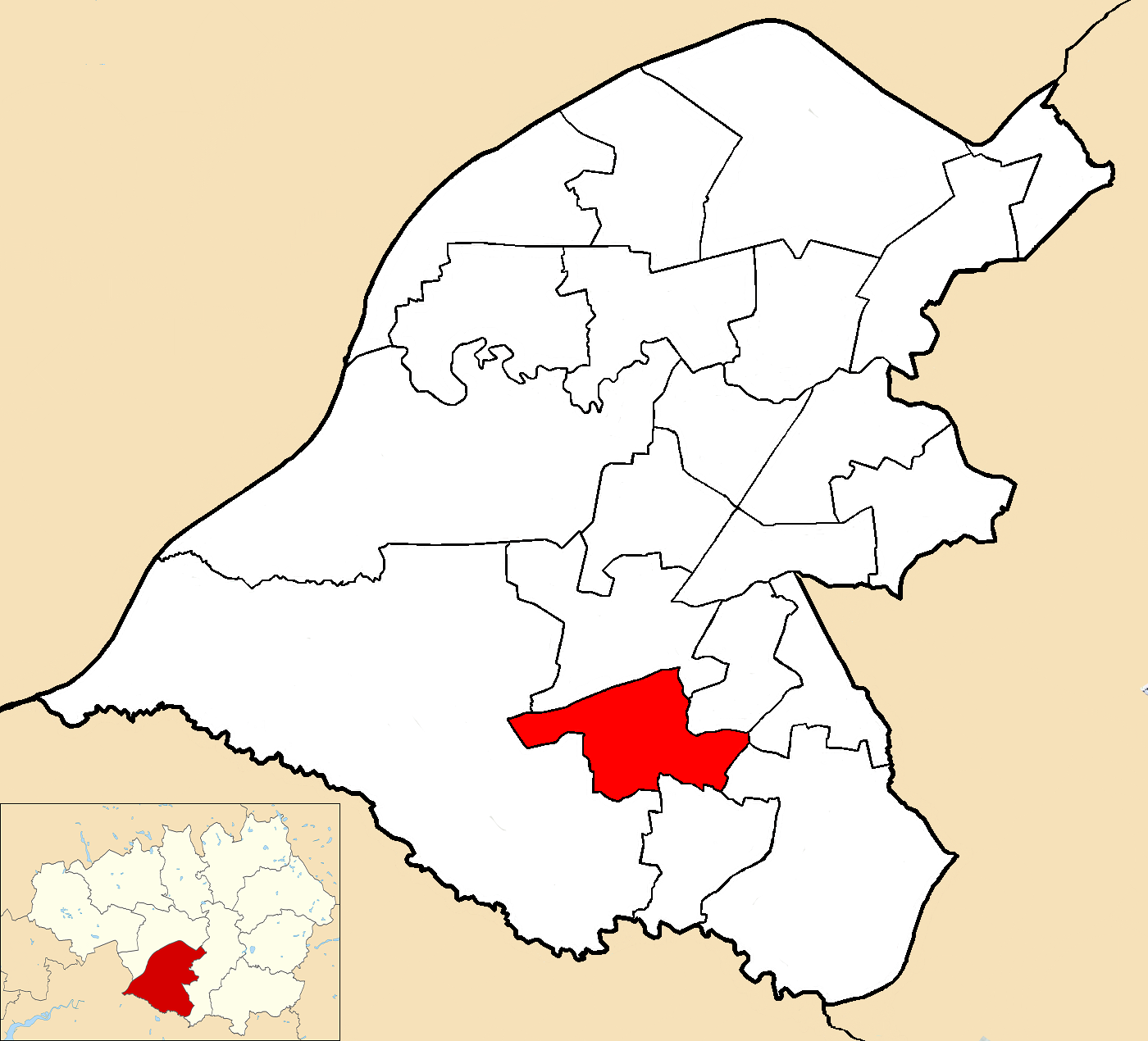
- Altrincham within Trafford
- Population: 11,873
- Metropolitan borough: Trafford
- Metropolitan county: Greater Manchester
- Country: England
- Sovereign state: United Kingdom
- UK Parliament: Altrincham and Sale West
- Councillors: Daniel Jerrome (Green); Michael Welton (Green); Geraldine Coggins (Green)

Altrincham is an electoral ward of Trafford covering the Town Centre and inner areas of Altrincham, Greater Manchester. It is represented by three local government councillors, each elected to serve a four-year term.

== Councillors ==
As of 2022, the councillors are Daniel Jerrome (Green), Michael Welton (Green), and Geraldine Coggins (Green).

Election	Councillor	Councillor	Councillor
1973	George Hoyle (Lab)	Kenneth Harrison (Con)	Raymond Littler (Con)
1975	George Hoyle (Lab)	Kenneth Harrison (Con)	Alan Whitehurst (Con)
1976	George Hoyle (Lab)	Catherine Gordon (Con)	Alan Whitehurst (Con)
1978	Marshall Rubin (Con)	Catherine Gordon (Con)	Alan Whitehurst (Con)
1979	Marshall Rubin (Con)	Catherine Gordon (Con)	Alan Whitehurst (Con)
1980	Marshall Rubin (Con)	Richard Finch (Con)	Catherine Gordon (Con)
1982	B. Slater (Con)	Richard Finch (Con)	Catherine Gordon (Con)
1983	B. Slater (Con)	Richard Finch (Con)	Catherine Gordon (Con)
1984	B. Slater (Con)	Richard Finch (Con)	Catherine Gordon (Con)
Mar 1986	B. Slater (Con)	J. Wood (Lab)	Catherine Gordon (Con)
1986	Steve Evans (Lab)	J. Wood (Lab)	Catherine Gordon (Con)
1987	Steve Evans (Lab)	J. Wood (Lab)	Catherine Gordon (Con)
1988	Steve Evans (Lab)	Sheila O'Beirne (Con)	Catherine Gordon (Con)
1990	E. Adams (Con)	Sheila O'Beirne (Con)	Catherine Gordon (Con)
1991	E. Adams (Con)	Sheila O'Beirne (Con)	Catherine Gordon (Con)
1992	E. Adams (Con)	Sheila O'Beirne (Con)	Catherine Gordon (Con)
1994	Richard Mrozinski (Con)	Sheila O'Beirne (Con)	Catherine Gordon (Con)
1995	Richard Mrozinski (Con)	Sheila O'Beirne (Con)	T. Crewe (Lab)
1996	Richard Mrozinski (Con)	Sheila O'Beirne (Con)	T. Crewe (Lab)
1998	Susan Fildes (Con)	Sheila O'Beirne (Con)	T. Crewe (Lab)
1999	Susan Fildes (Con)	Sheila O'Beirne (Ind)	Deborah Lynch (Con)
2000	Susan Fildes (Con)	Paula Pearson (Con)	Deborah Lynch (Con)
2002	Susan Fildes (Con)	Paula Pearson (Con)	Deborah Lynch (Con)
2003	Susan Fildes (Con)	Paula Pearson (Con)	Alex Williams (Con)
2004	Susan Fildes (Con)	Alex Williams (Con)	Stephen Ogden (Con)
2006	Susan Fildes (Con)	Alex Williams (Con)	Michael Young (Con)
2007	Susan Fildes (Con)	Alex Williams (Con)	Michael Young (Con)
2008	Susan Williams, née Fildes (Con)	Alex Williams (Con)	Michael Young (Con)
2010	Susan Williams (Con)	Alex Williams (Con)	Michael Young (Con)
2011	Alex Williams (Con)	Matt Colledge (Con)	Michael Young (Con)
2012	Alex Williams (Con)	Matt Colledge (Con)	Michael Young (Con)
2014	Alex Williams (Con)	Michael Young (Con)	Matthew Sephton (Con)
2015	Alex Williams (Con)	Michael Young (Con)	Matthew Sephton (Con)
2016	Alex Williams (Con)	Michael Young (Con)	Matthew Sephton (Con)
2017	Alex Williams (Con)	Michael Young (Con)	Matthew Sephton (Ind)
2018	Geraldine Coggins (Green)	Michael Young (Con)	Daniel Jerrome (Green)
2019	Geraldine Coggins (Green)	Michael Welton (Green)	Daniel Jerrome (Green)
2021	Geraldine Coggins (Green)	Michael Welton (Green)	Daniel Jerrome (Green)
2022	Geraldine Coggins (Green)	Michael Welton (Green)	Daniel Jerrome (Green)
2023	Geraldine Coggins (Green)	Daniel Jerrome (Green)	Michael Welton (Green)
2024	Geraldine Coggins (Green)	Daniel Jerrome (Green)	Michael Welton (Green)

indicates seat up for re-election. indicates the councillor became an independent councillor. indicates seat up for election following resignation of sitting councillor.

== Elections in the 2020s ==
=== May 2026 ===
2026
Party	Candidate	Votes	%	±%
Green	Dan Jerrome*	1,744	44.1	−12.9
Conservative	Nick Dean	1,099	27.8	+3.9
Reform	Stuart Niven	556	14.1	N/A
Labour	Mark Nesbitt	363	9.2	−6.1
Liberal Democrats	Donald McIntosh	180	4.6	+1.6
Majority		645	16.3	−16.7
Rejected ballots		12	0.4	-0.4
Turnout		3,955	48.6	+5.6
Registered electors		8,131		
Green hold		Swing	-8.4	

=== May 2024 ===
2024
Party	Candidate	Votes	%	±%
Green	Michael Welton*	1,927	57.0	−4.5
Conservative	Julie Ashall	810	23.9	+2.1
Labour	Will Franks	518	15.3	+2.6
Liberal Democrats	Mario Miniaci	103	3.0	−1.8
Majority		1,117	33.0	−4.0
Rejected ballots		25	0.7	-0.2
Turnout		3,383	43.0	+1.2
Registered electors		7,876		
Green hold		Swing	-3.3	

=== May 2023 ===
2023 (3)
Party	Candidate	Votes	%	±%
Green	Geraldine Coggins*	1,980	61.5%	
Green	Dan Jerrome*	1,947	60.4%	
Green	Michael Welton*	1,896	58.8%	
Conservative	Richard Bliss	704	21.8%	
Conservative	Patrick Myers**	697	21.6%	
Conservative	Kamy Achanta	664	20.6%	
Labour	Charlie Mayer	410	12.7%	
Labour	Ben Slater	364	11.3%	
Labour	William Weston	321	10.0%	
Liberal Democrats	Laura Brophy	155	4.8%	
Liberal Democrats	Simon Hepburn	103	3.2%	
Liberal Democrats	Margaret Kinsella	103	3.2%	
Majority				
Rejected ballots		30	0.1%	
Turnout		3222	41.8%	
Registered electors		7,709		

=== May 2022 ===
2022
Party	Candidate	Votes	%	±%
Green	Daniel Jerrome*	2,354	60.6	
Conservative	Anand Chinthala	947	24.4	
Labour	Benjamin Slater	469	12.7	
Liberal Democrats	Christopher Lovell	103	2.7	
Majority		1407	36.2	
Registered electors		9,057		
Turnout		3883	42.9	
Green hold		Swing		

=== May 2021 ===
2021 Trafford Metropolitan Borough Council election
Party	Candidate	Votes	%	±%
Green	Geraldine Coggins*	2,387	55.5	▲16.3
Conservative	Shengke Zhi	1,227	28.5	N/A
Labour	Ben Slater	567	13.2	N/A
Liberal Democrats	David Martin	93	2.2	▼0.1
Majority		1,160	27.0	N/A
Rejected ballots		27		
Registered electors		9,189		
Turnout		4,301	46.8	▲0.3
Green hold		Swing	N/A	

== Elections in the 2010s ==
=== May 2019 ===
2019 Trafford Metropolitan Borough Council election
Party	Candidate	Votes	%	±%
Green	Michael Welton	2,377	61.3	▲16.0
Conservative	Angela Stone	1,057	27.3	▼5.0
Labour	Ged Carter	313	8.1	▼11.6
Liberal Democrats	David Martin	128	3.3	▲0.7
Majority		1,320	34.1	N/A
Registered electors		8,867		
Turnout		3,875	43.96	▼3.14
Green gain from Conservative		Swing	–	

=== May 2018 ===
Alex Williams, elected in 2016, resigned from his seat, creating a second vacancy.

2018 Trafford Metropolitan Borough Council election (2)
Party	Candidate	Votes	%	±%
Green	Daniel Jerrome	1,944	47.0	▲23.3
Green	Geraldine Coggins	1,621	39.2	–
Conservative	Constantine Biller	1,386	33.5	▼13.2
Conservative	Angela Stone	1,342	32.5	–
Labour	Stephane Savary	846	20.5	▼2.8
Labour	Barry Winstanley	655	15.8	–
Liberal Democrats	Julian Newgrosh	118	2.9	▼3.4
Liberal Democrats	David Martin	93	2.3	–
Majority		558	13.0	N/A
Registered electors		8,892		
Turnout		4,133	46.5	▲7.7
Green gain from Conservative		Swing	▲18.0	
Green gain from Conservative		Swing	–	

=== May 2016 ===
2016 Trafford Metropolitan Borough Council election
Party	Candidate	Votes	%	±%
Conservative	Alexander Williams*	1,533	46.7	▼6.8
Green	Daniel Jerrome	777	23.7	▲11.7
Labour	Amy Whyte	763	23.3	▼0.7
Liberal Democrats	Julian Newgrosh	207	6.3	▼4.3
Majority		756	23.0	▼6.5
Turnout			38.8	▼28.0
Conservative hold		Swing	▼9.3	

=== May 2015 ===
2015 Trafford Metropolitan Borough Council election
Party	Candidate	Votes	%	±%
Conservative	Michael Young*	3,102	53.5	▲4.7
Labour	Waseem Hassan	1,390	24.0	▼2.5
Green	Daniel Jerome	694	12.0	▼2.4
Liberal Democrats	Richard Elliott	612	10.6	▲0.2
Majority		1,712	29.5	▲7.2
Turnout			66.8	▲30.1
Conservative hold		Swing	▲3.6	

=== May 2014 ===
2014 Trafford Metropolitan Borough Council election (2)
Party	Candidate	Votes	%	±%
Conservative	Matthew Sephton	1,515	48.8	▼2.5
Conservative	Michael Young*	1,371	–	–
Labour	Aidan Williams	823	26.5	▼6.6
Labour	Waseem Hassan	584	–	–
Green	Nick Davies	447	14.4	▲5.5
Green	Caroline Robertson-Brown	347	–	–
Liberal Democrats	Julian Newgrosh	322	10.4	▲3.7
Liberal Democrats	Martin Elliott	251	–	–
Majority		692	22.3	▲4.1
Turnout			36.7	▲1.9
Conservative hold		Swing	▲2.1	
Conservative hold		Swing	–	

=== May 2012 ===
2012 Trafford Metropolitan Borough Council election
Party	Candidate	Votes	%	±%
Conservative	Alex Williams*	1,446	51.3	▲1.3
Labour	Aidan Williams	933	33.1	▲3.5
Green	Deborah Leftwich	252	8.9	▲0.7
Liberal Democrats	Julian Newgrosh	190	6.7	▼5.6
Majority		513	18.2	▼2.2
Turnout			34.8	▼7.7
Conservative hold		Swing	▼1.1	

=== May 2011 ===
2011 Trafford Metropolitan Borough Council election (2)
Party	Candidate	Votes	%	±%
Conservative	Matt Colledge	1,752	50.0	▲6.0
Conservative	Alex Williams*	1,563	–	–
Labour	Gwyneth Brock	1,036	29.6	▲3.5
Labour	Thom Shelton	934		
Liberal Democrats	Karin Holden	431	11.9	▼10.9
Liberal Democrats	Roger Legge	355	–	–
Green	Paul Bayliss	286	8.2	▲4.7
Green	Deborah Leftwich	238	–	–
Majority		716	20.4	▲2.5
Turnout			42.5	▼22.0
Conservative hold		Swing	▲1.3	
Conservative hold		Swing	–	

Matt Colledge replaced Susan Williams after she was made Baroness Williams of Trafford. Matthew Sephton subsequently replaced Matt Colledge, who stood down in 2014.

=== May 2010 ===
2010 Trafford Metropolitan Borough Council election
Party	Candidate	Votes	%	±%
Conservative	Michael Young*	2,366	44.0	▼12.3
Labour	Peter Baugh	1,404	26.1	▲4.2
Liberal Democrats	Roger Legge	1,250	23.2	▲11.8
Green	Deborah Leftwich	190	3.5	▼2.0
English Democrat	Steve Mills	168	3.1	New
Majority		962	17.9	▼16.5
Turnout			64.5	▲29.3
Conservative hold		Swing	▼8.3	

== Elections in the 2000s ==
=== May 2008 ===
2008
Party	Candidate	Votes	%	±%
Conservative	Susan Williams*	1,590	56.3	+0.3
Labour	Majella Kennedy	620	22.0	−0.5
Liberal Democrats	Roger Legge	323	11.4	−2.9
Green	Deborah Leftwich	155	5.5	−1.7
Independent	Sarah Walmsley	137	4.9	+4.9
Majority		970	34.3	+0.9
Turnout		2,825	35.2	−2.9
Conservative hold		Swing		

=== May 2007 ===
2007
Party	Candidate	Votes	%	±%
Conservative	Alex Williams*	1,618	56.0	+2.4
Labour	Graham Crean	651	22.5	−0.4
Liberal Democrats	Mark Kelly	413	14.3	−0.8
Green	Liz O’Neill	209	7.2	−1.2
Majority		967	33.4	+2.7
Turnout		2,819	38.1	+2.4
Conservative hold		Swing		

=== May 2006 ===
2006
Party	Candidate	Votes	%	±%
Conservative	Michael Young	1,430	53.6	−17.6
Labour	Peter Baugh	611	22.9	+7.2
Liberal Democrats	Roger Legge	404	15.1	+2.0
Green	Jadwiga Leigh	225	8.4	+8.4
Majority		819	30.7	+2.8
Turnout		2,670	35.7	−11.5
Conservative hold		Swing		

=== May 2004 ===
2004 (after boundary changes)
Party	Candidate	Votes	%	±%
Conservative	Susan Fildes*	1,837	25.4	
Conservative	Alexander Williams*	1,670	23.1	
Conservative	Stephen Ogden	1,642	22.7	
Labour	John Graham	1,137	15.7	
Liberal Democrats	Roger Legge	949	13.1	
Turnout		7,235	47.2	
Conservative win (new seat)				
Conservative win (new seat)				
Conservative win (new seat)				

=== May 2003 ===
2003
Party	Candidate	Votes	%	±%
Conservative	Alexander Williams	2,634	58.7	+4.2
Labour	David Armstrong	1,212	27.0	−5.0
Liberal Democrats	Roger Legge	641	14.3	+0.8
Majority		1,422	31.7	+9.2
Turnout		4,487	52.0	−0.8
Conservative hold		Swing		

=== May 2002 ===
2002
Party	Candidate	Votes	%	±%
Conservative	Susan Fildes*	2,503	54.5	−4.6
Labour	Peter Baugh	1,472	32.0	+4.9
Liberal Democrats	Christopher Gaskell	621	13.5	+6.7
Majority		1,031	22.5	−9.5
Turnout		4,596	52.8	+20.4
Conservative hold		Swing		

=== May 2000 ===
2000
Party	Candidate	Votes	%	±%
Conservative	Paula Pearson	1,689	59.1	+9.2
Labour	David Armstrong	774	27.1	−16.0
Independent	Sheila O'Bierne*	201	7.0	+7.0
Liberal Democrats	Roger Legge	193	6.8	−0.2
Majority		915	32.0	+25.2
Turnout		2,857	32.4	−5.9
Conservative gain from Independent		Swing		

== Elections in the 1990s ==
1999
Party	Candidate	Votes	%	±%
Conservative	Ms D. Lynch	1,684	49.9	−0.8
Labour	J. Graham	1,455	43.1	−1.7
Liberal Democrats	D. M. Jones	237	7.0	+7.0
Majority		229	6.8	+0.9
Turnout		3,376	38.3	+0.7
Conservative gain from Labour		Swing		

1998
Party	Candidate	Votes	%	±%
Conservative	S. F. M. Fildes	1,700	50.7	+1.4
Labour	J. C. Graham	1,501	44.8	−3.6
Independent	P. J. Royle	77	2.3	+2.3
Independent	A. L. Brookes	74	2.2	+2.2
Majority		199	5.9	−2.3
Turnout		3,352	37.6	−0.6
Conservative gain from Independent		Swing		

1996
Party	Candidate	Votes	%	±%
Conservative	S. M. O'Bierne*	1,676	49.3	+6.2
Labour	S. D. McNee	1,399	41.2	−7.9
Liberal Democrats	J. B. Weightman	322	9.5	+1.2
Majority		277	8.2	+2.2
Turnout		3,397	38.2	−5.9
Conservative hold		Swing		

1995
Party	Candidate	Votes	%	±%
Labour	T. G. Crewe	1,908	49.1	+7.5
Conservative	A. H. Wilson	1,675	43.1	−0.4
Liberal Democrats	K. Clarke	322	8.3	−6.6
Majority		233	6.0	+4.2
Turnout		3,887	44.1	+0.7
Labour gain from Conservative		Swing		

1994
Party	Candidate	Votes	%	±%
Conservative	R. A. Mrozinski	1,642	43.5	−14.7
Labour	J. Torpey	1,573	41.6	+13.1
Liberal Democrats	K. Clarke	564	14.9	+4.5
Majority		69	1.8	−27.9
Turnout		3,779	43.4	+2.6
Conservative hold		Swing		

1992
Party	Candidate	Votes	%	±%
Conservative	S. M. O'Bierne*	2,001	58.2	+8.8
Labour	S. Hesford	979	28.5	−10.3
Liberal Democrats	P. A. Stubbs	357	10.4	−1.4
Green	B. J. Edwards	100	2.9	+2.9
Majority		1,022	29.7	+19.1
Turnout		3,437	40.8	−7.2
Conservative hold		Swing		

1991
Party	Candidate	Votes	%	±%
Conservative	C. S. Gordon*	1,970	49.4	+4.8
Labour	F. W. Bamford	1,546	38.8	−4.5
Liberal Democrats	M. H. Cameron	470	11.8	+5.4
Majority		424	10.6	+9.2
Turnout		3,986	48.0	−2.0
Conservative hold		Swing		

1990
Party	Candidate	Votes	%	±%
Conservative	E. K. Adams	1,876	44.6	−4.4
Labour	F. W. Bamford	1,818	43.3	+4.9
Liberal Democrats	J. B. Weightman	267	6.4	−6.2
Green	M. R. Rowtham	241	5.7	+5.7
Majority		58	1.4	−9.2
Turnout		4,202	50.0	+3.4
Conservative gain from Labour		Swing		

== Elections in the 1980s ==
1988
Party	Candidate	Votes	%	±%
Conservative	S. M. O'Beirne	1,934	49.0	−2.7
Labour	D. Hinder	1,516	38.4	+6.4
Liberal Democrats	J. H. Mulholland	498	12.6	−3.7
Majority		418	10.6	−9.1
Turnout		3,948	46.6	−2.9
Conservative gain from Labour		Swing		

1987
Party	Candidate	Votes	%	±%
Conservative	C. S. Gordon*	2,128	51.7	+15.3
Labour	D. Hinder	1,318	32.0	−9.1
SDP	C. F. Keeley-Huggett	673	16.3	−3.2
Majority		810	19.7	+15.1
Turnout		4,119	49.5	+3.4
Conservative hold		Swing		

1986
Party	Candidate	Votes	%	±%
Labour	S. M. Evans	1,523	41.1	+2.3
Conservative	B. L. Slater*	1,352	36.4	−7.2
SDP	B. M. Keeley-Huggett	725	19.5	+19.5
Green	N. J. Eadie	110	3.0	+1.4
Majority		171	4.6	−0.2
Turnout		3,710	46.1	+3.9
Labour gain from Conservative		Swing		

By-Election 6 March 1986
Party	Candidate	Votes	%	±%
Labour	J. F. L. Wood	1,150	38.2	−0.6
Conservative	S. M. A. O' Beirne	983	32.7	−10.9
SDP	B. M. Keeley-Huggett	793	26.4	+26.4
Green	N. J. Eadie	81	2.7	+1.1
Majority		167	5.6	+0.8
Turnout		3,007	37.4	−11.9
Labour gain from Conservative		Swing		

1984
Party	Candidate	Votes	%	±%
Conservative	G. R. Finch*	1,473	43.6	−5.7
Labour	P. A. Baldwinson	1,312	38.8	+6.6
Liberal	P. C. Barns	540	16.0	−2.5
Ecology	A. M. Wildbore	53	1.6	+1.6
Majority		161	4.8	−12.3
Turnout		3,378	42.2	+1.0
Conservative hold		Swing		

1983
Party	Candidate	Votes	%	±%
Conservative	C. S. Gordon*	1,662	49.3	+0.4
Labour	P. A. Baldwinson	1,087	32.2	+8.1
Alliance	G. E. Evans	622	18.5	−8.5
Majority		575	17.1	−4.8
Turnout		3,371	41.2	−0.4
Conservative hold		Swing		

1982
Party	Candidate	Votes	%	±%
Conservative	B. L. Slater	1,632	48.9	+3.3
SDP	G. E. Evans	901	27.0	+27.0
Labour	J. Koch	803	24.1	−12.7
Majority		731	21.9	+19.2
Turnout		3,336	41.6	+1.8
Conservative hold		Swing		

1980 (2 vacancies)
Party	Candidate	Votes	%	±%
Conservative	G. R. Finch	1,472	24.0	−5.2
Conservative	C. S. Gordon*	1,323	21.6	−10.0
Labour	G. H. Mountain	1,156	18.8	+37.6
Labour	G. R. Scott	1,102	18.0	+36.0
Liberal	M. C. Booth	593	9.7	−27.4
Liberal	H. M. Hughes	490	8.0	−30.8
Majority		167	2.7	−3.8
Turnout		6,136	39.8	−29.7
Conservative hold		Swing		
Conservative hold		Swing		

== Elections in the 1970s ==
1979
Party	Candidate	Votes	%	±%
Conservative	A. E. A. Whitehurst*	2,384	53.2	−1.2
Liberal	M. C. Booth	2,093	46.8	+29.6
Majority		291	6.5	−19.5
Turnout		4,477	69.5	+36.7
Conservative hold		Swing		

1978
Party	Candidate	Votes	%	±%
Conservative	M. Rubin	1,131	54.4	+0.9
Labour	E. McPherson	590	28.4	+1.6
Liberal	G. M. R. Willmott	357	17.2	−2.5
Majority		541	26.0	−0.7
Turnout		2,078	32.8	−7.5
Conservative gain from Labour		Swing		

1976
Party	Candidate	Votes	%	±%
Conservative	C. S. Gordon	1,373	53.5	+10.6
Labour	E. Axon	687	26.8	−0.2
Liberal	P. C. Feanhley	506	19.7	−10.4
Majority		686	26.7	+13.9
Turnout		2,566	40.3	−1.3
Conservative hold		Swing		

1975
Party	Candidate	Votes	%	±%
Conservative	A. E. A. Whitehurst	1,147	42.9	
Liberal	J. B. Kenny	806	30.1	
Labour	R. Crossman	721	27.0	
Majority		341	12.8	
Turnout		2,674	41.6	
Conservative hold		Swing		

1973
Party	Candidate	Votes	%	±%
Labour	G. Hoyle	1,265	48.6	
Conservative	K. A. Harrison	1,240	47.6	
Conservative	A. R. Littler	1,150		
Conservative	A. Whitehurst	1,140		
Labour	H. Harmer	1,102		
Labour	A. Crossman	1,075		
Communist	J. Brennan	99	3.8	
Majority		10		
Turnout		2,504	36.4	
Labour win (new seat)				
Conservative win (new seat)				
Conservative win (new seat)				
