= Bowdon (ward) =

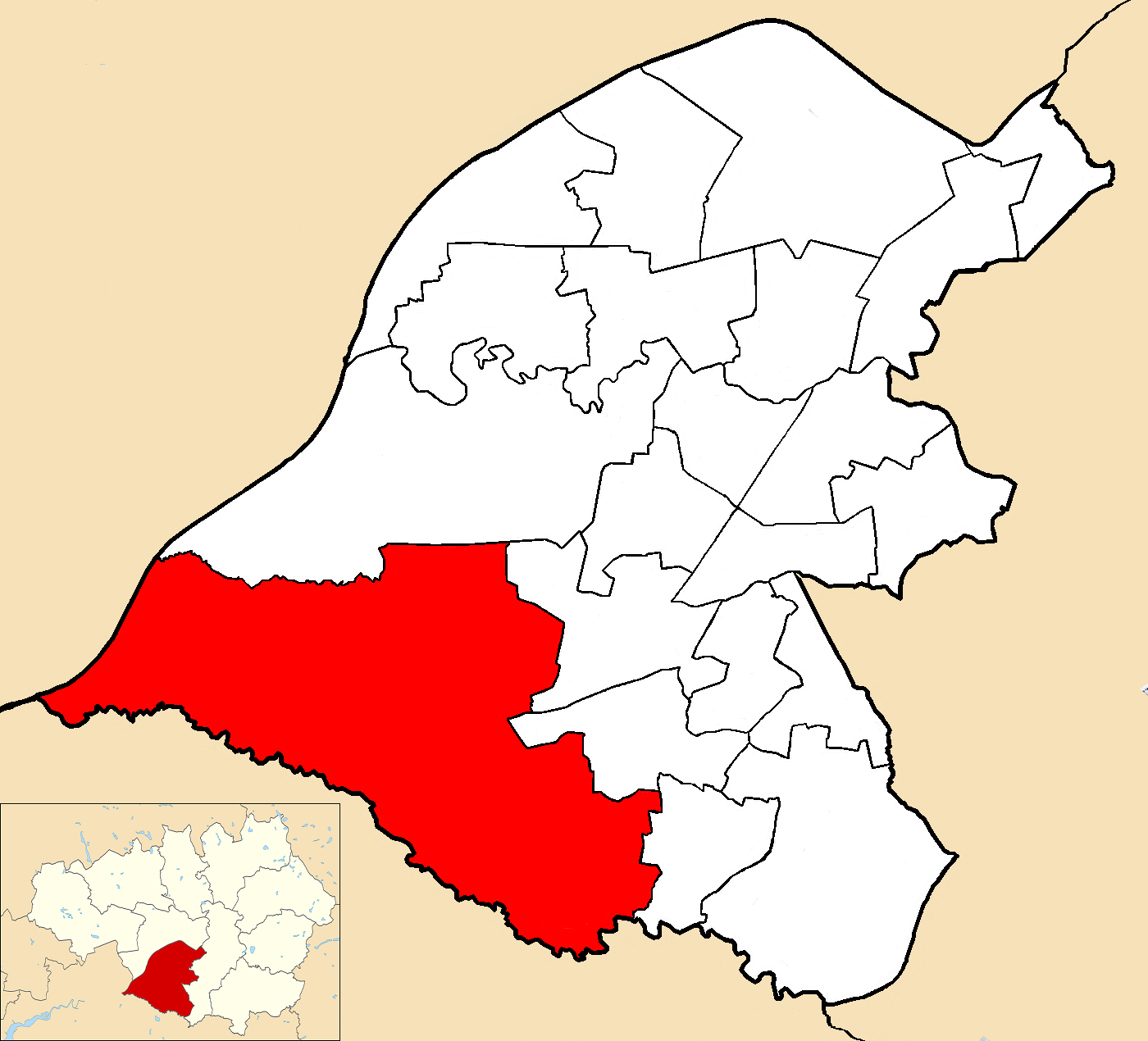
- Bowdon within Trafford
- Population: 9,284
- Metropolitan borough: Trafford
- Metropolitan county: Greater Manchester
- Country: England
- Sovereign state: United Kingdom
- UK Parliament: Altrincham and Sale West
- Councillors: Shengke Zhi (Conservative); Lisa Hancock (Conservative); Phil Eckersley (Conservative)

Bowdon is an electoral ward of Trafford covering the Bowdon, Dunham Town and Dunham Massey areas of Altrincham, Greater Manchester, and the village of Warburton, Lymm.

== Councillors ==
As of 2022, the councillors are Shengke Zhi (Conservative), Lisa Hancock (Conservative), and Phil Eckersley (Conservative).

Election	Councillor	Councillor	Councillor
1973	J. Gill (Con)	Barbara Hall (Con)	J. Humphreys (Con)
1975	J. Gill (Con)	Barbara Hall (Con)	J. Humphreys (Con)
1976	J. Gill (Con)	Barbara Hall (Con)	J. Humphreys (Con)
1978	J. Gill (Con)	Barbara Hall (Con)	J. Humphreys (Con)
1979	J. Gill (Con)	Barbara Hall (Con)	J. Humphreys (Con)
1980	J. Gill (Con)	Barbara Hall (Con)	J. Humphreys (Con)
1982	J. Gill (Con)	Barbara Hall (Con)	J. Humphreys (Con)
1983	J. Gill (Con)	Barbara Hall (Con)	Geoff Barker (Con)
1984	J. Gill (Con)	Barbara Hall (Con)	Geoff Barker (Con)
1986	J. Gill (Con)	Barbara Hall (Con)	Geoff Barker (Con)
1987	J. Gill (Con)	Barbara Hall (Con)	Geoff Barker (Con)
1988	J. Gill (Con)	David Merrell (Con)	Geoff Barker (Con)
Jun 1989	Marie Harney (Con)	David Merrell (Con)	Geoff Barker (Con)
1990	Marie Harney (Con)	David Merrell (Con)	Stephanie Poole (Con)
1991	Marie Harney (Con)	David Merrell (Con)	Stephanie Poole (Con)
1992	Marie Harney (Con)	David Merrell (Con)	Stephanie Poole (Con)
1994	Marie Harney (Con)	David Merrell (Con)	Stephanie Poole (Con)
1995	Marie Harney (Con)	David Merrell (Con)	Stephanie Poole (Con)
1996	Marie Harney (Con)	David Merrell (Con)	Stephanie Poole (Con)
1998	Marie Harney (Con)	David Merrell (Con)	Stephanie Poole (Con)
1999	Marie Harney (Con)	David Merrell (Con)	Stephanie Poole (Con)
2000	Marie Harney (Con)	David Merrell (Con)	Stephanie Poole (Con)
2002	Marie Harney (Con)	David Merrell (Con)	Stephanie Poole (Con)
2003	Marie Harney (Con)	David Merrell (Con)	Stephanie Poole (Con)
2004	David Merrell (Con)	Stephanie Poole (Con)	Paula Pearson (Con)
2006	David Merrell (Con)	Stephanie Poole (Con)	Paula Pearson (Con)
2007	David Merrell (Con)	Stephanie Poole (Con)	Paula Pearson (Con)
2008	Sean Anstee (Con)	Stephanie Poole (Con)	Paula Pearson (Con)
2010	Sean Anstee (Con)	Michael Hyman (Con)	Karen Barclay (Con)
2011	Sean Anstee (Con)	Michael Hyman (Con)	Karen Barclay (Con)
2012	Sean Anstee (Con)	Michael Hyman (Con)	Karen Barclay (Con)
2014	Sean Anstee (Con)	Michael Hyman (Con)	Karen Barclay (Con)
2015	Sean Anstee (Con)	Michael Hyman (Con)	Karen Barclay (Con)
2016	Sean Anstee (Con)	Michael Hyman (Con)	Karen Barclay (Con)
2018	Sean Anstee (Con)	Michael Hyman (Con)	Karen Barclay (Con)
2019	Sean Anstee (Con)	Claire Churchill (Con)	Karen Barclay (Con)
2021	Mussadak Mirza (Con)	Michael Whetton (Con)	Karen Barclay (Con)
2022	Mussadak Mirza (Con)	Michael Whetton (Con)	Shengke Zhi (Con)
2023	Phil Eckersley (Con)	Shengke Zhi (Con)	Michael Whetton (Con)
2024	Phil Eckersley (Con)	Shengke Zhi (Con)	Lisa Hancock (Con)
2026	Phil Eckersley (Con)	Shengke Zhi (Con)	Lisa Hancock (Con)

indicates seat up for re-election. indicates seat up for election following resignation of sitting councillor.

== Elections in the 2020s ==
=== May 2026 ===
2026
Party	Candidate	Votes	%	±%
Conservative	Shengke Zhi*	2,616	54.3	+11.4
Green	Bridget Green	1,424	29.6	−12.8
Reform	Michelle McCusker	445	9.2	+4.9
Labour	Kate Lamerton	203	4.2	−3.8
Liberal Democrats	Ludo Tolhust-Cleaver	105	2.2	+0.2
Advance UK	Ron Hutton	11	0.2	N/A
Majority		1,192	24.7	+24.2
Rejected ballots		12	0.2	-0.1
Turnout		4,817	56.3	+8.4
Registered electors		8,558		
Conservative hold		Swing	+12.1	

=== May 2024 ===
2024
Party	Candidate	Votes	%	±%
Conservative	Lisa Hancock	1,719	42.9	−4.0
Green	Bridget Green	1,698	42.4	+1.3
Labour	Kate Lamerton	322	8.0	−1.1
Reform	Paul Swansborough	174	4.3	N/A
Liberal Democrats	Ludo Tolhust-Cleaver	82	2.0	−1.6
Majority		21	0.5	−3.6
Rejected ballots		11	0.3	-0.2
Turnout		4,006	47.9	+2.0
Registered electors		8,361		
Conservative hold		Swing	-2.7	

=== May 2023 ===
2023 (3)
Party	Candidate	Votes	%	±%
Conservative	Phil Eckersley	1,806	46.9%	
Conservative	Shengke Zhi*	1,756	45.6%	
Conservative	Michael Whetton*	1,741	45.2%	
Green	Bridget Green	1,584	41.1%	
Green	Kate Gilmartin	1,580	41.0%	
Green	Gareth Twose	1,431	37.2%	
Labour	Thomas Hague	350	9.1%	
Labour	Kate Lamerton	347	9.0%	
Labour	Josh Spindler	261	6.8%	
Liberal Democrats	Harvey Davies	137	3.6%	
Liberal Democrats	Mario Miniaci	110	2.9%	
Liberal Democrats	Matthew Sellars	95	2.5%	
Majority				
Rejected ballots		18	0.5%	
Turnout		3,851	45.9%	
Registered electors		8,396		

=== May 2022 ===
2022
Party	Candidate	Votes	%	±%
Conservative	Shengke Zhi	1,628	51.9	
Green	Gareth Twose	826	26.3	
Labour	Thomas Hague	450	14.3	
Liberal Democrats	Ludo Tolhurst-Cleaver	221	7.0	
Majority		802	25.6	
Registered electors		7,274		
Turnout		3136	43.1	
Conservative hold		Swing		

=== May 2021 ===
2021
Party	Candidate	Votes	%	±%
Conservative	Mussadak Mirza	1,814	53.4	N/A
Conservative	Michael Whetton	1,763	51.9	N/A
Green	Bridget Green	684	20.1	N/A
Labour	Thomas Hague	672	19.8	N/A
Labour	Charles Mayer	471	13.9	N/A
Green	Martin Skelton	331	9.7	N/A
Liberal Democrats	Ludo Tolhurst-Cleaver	226	6.7	N/A
Liberal Democrats	Mario Miniaci	216	6.4	N/A
Majority		N/A		
Rejected ballots		36		
Registered electors		7,316		
Turnout		3,396	46.4	▲5.1
Conservative hold		Swing	N/A	
Conservative hold		Swing	N/A	

== Elections in the 2010s ==
=== May 2019 ===
2019
Party	Candidate	Votes	%	±%
Conservative	Claire Churchill	1,727	59.5	▼8.9
Liberal Democrats	Ludo Tolhurst-Cleaver	411	14.0	▲2.8
Green	Deborah Leftwich	411	14.0	▲8.8
Labour	Thomas Hague	351	12.2	▼1.4
Majority		1,316	45.4	▼9.5
Registered electors		7,171		
Turnout		2,929	40.4	▼2.1
Conservative hold		Swing		

=== May 2018 ===
2018
Party	Candidate	Votes	%	±%
Conservative	Karen Barclay*	2,130	68.4	−2.6
Labour	Waseem Hassan	422	13.5	−1.8
Liberal Democrats	Ludo Tolhurst-Cleaver	356	11.4	+3.4
Green	Nigel Hennerley	169	5.4	−0.3
UKIP	Jim Cook	39	1.3	+1.3
Majority		1,708	54.8	−0.8
Turnout		3,116	42.5	+1.2
Conservative hold		Swing		

=== May 2016 ===
2016
Party	Candidate	Votes	%	±%
Conservative	Sean Anstee*	2,090	71.0	+0.4
Labour	Charles Mayer	452	15.3	+0.6
Liberal Democrats	Kirstie Davidson	235	8.0	+0.9
Green	Daniel Wadsworth	168	5.7	−1.9
Majority		1,638	55.6	−0.2
Turnout		2,947	41.3	−30.7
Conservative hold		Swing		

=== May 2015 ===
2015
Party	Candidate	Votes	%	±%
Conservative	Michael Hyman*	3,700	70.6	+1.1
Labour	Tom Hague	773	14.7	+3.5
Green	Nicholas Davies	398	7.6	−1.7
Liberal Democrats	Elizabeth Hogg	370	7.1	+0.4
Majority		2,927	55.8	+1.1
Turnout		5,241	72.0	+23.4
Conservative hold		Swing		

=== May 2014 ===
2014
Party	Candidate	Votes	%	±%
Conservative	Karen Barclay*	2,042	69.5	+1.2
Labour	Thomas Hague	428	11.2	−4.4
Green	Bridget Green	273	9.3	+2.2
Liberal Democrats	Kirstie Davidson	197	6.7	−0.1
Majority		1614	54.8	+2.2
Turnout		2940	40.4	+1.6
Conservative hold		Swing		

=== May 2012 ===
2012
Party	Candidate	Votes	%	±%
Conservative	Sean Anstee*	1,885	68.3	−2.4
Labour	Thomas Hague	432	15.6	+0.3
Green	Bridget Green	257	9.3	+2.2
Liberal Democrats	Kirstie Davidson	187	6.8	−0.1
Majority		1,453	52.6	−2.8
Turnout		2,761	38.8	−9.8
Conservative hold		Swing		

=== May 2011 ===
2011
Party	Candidate	Votes	%	±%
Conservative	Michael Hyman*	2,497	70.7	+5.4
Labour	Thomas Hague	541	15.3	+3.3
Green	Bridget Green	251	7.1	+1.0
Liberal Democrats	Kirstie Davidson	242	6.9	−9.8
Majority		1,956	55.4	+12.4
Turnout		3,531	48.6	−21.8
Conservative hold		Swing		

=== May 2010 ===
2010 (2 vacancies)
Party	Candidate	Votes	%	±%
Conservative	Karen Barclay	3,304	34.2	−5.0
Conservative	Michael Hyman	3,000	31.1	−11.2
Liberal Democrats	Stuart Carter	924	9.6	+7.9
Liberal Democrats	James Eisen	682	7.1	+2.9
Labour	Thomas Hague	592	6.1	+3.6
Labour	Graham Crean	566	5.9	−2.7
Green	Bridget Green	329	3.4	+0.4
Green	Rosemary Graham	261	2.7	−1.0
Majority		2,076	43.0	−19.5
Turnout		9,658	70.4	+30.5
Conservative hold		Swing		
Conservative hold		Swing		

== Elections in the 2000s ==
=== May 2008 ===
2008
Party	Candidate	Votes	%	±%
Conservative	Sean Anstee	2,187	73.4	+2.4
Liberal Democrats	Ian Chappell	334	11.3	−0.4
Labour	Thomas Hague	255	8.6	−1.3
Green	Bridget Green	190	6.4	−1.0
Majority		1,853	62.5	+3.2
Turnout		2,966	39.9	−1.6
Conservative hold		Swing		

=== May 2007 ===
2007
Party	Candidate	Votes	%	±%
Conservative	Stephanie Poole*	2,132	71.0	+1.2
Liberal Democrats	Ian Chappell	351	11.7	−1.2
Labour	Thomas Hague	297	9.9	−0.2
Green	Bridget Green	222	7.4	+0.2
Majority		1,781	59.3	+2.4
Turnout		3,002	41.5	−2.0
Conservative hold		Swing		

=== May 2006 ===
2006
Party	Candidate	Votes	%	±%
Conservative	Paula Pearson*	2,085	69.8	−8.2
Liberal Democrats	Ian Chappell	385	12.9	+3.2
Labour	Thomas Hague	300	10.1	+3.7
Green	Bridget Green	216	7.2	+1.3
Majority		1,700	56.9	+9.9
Turnout		2,986	41.7	−12.0
Conservative hold		Swing		

=== May 2004 ===
2004 (after boundary changes)
Party	Candidate	Votes	%	±%
Conservative	David Merrell*	2,454	26.6	
Conservative	Stephanie Poole*	2,402	26.0	
Conservative	Paula Pearson*	2,345	25.4	
Liberal Democrats	Ian Chappell	899	9.7	
Labour	Thomas Hague	590	6.4	
Green	Margaret Westbrook	546	5.9	
Turnout		9,236	53.7	
Conservative win (new seat)				
Conservative win (new seat)				
Conservative win (new seat)				

=== May 2003 ===
2003
Party	Candidate	Votes	%	±%
Conservative	Stephanie Poole*	3,475	65.7	+1.8
Liberal Democrats	Christopher Gaskill	870	16.5	+1.9
Labour	Helen Walsh	535	10.1	−4.6
Green	Bridget Green	408	7.7	+0.8
Majority		2,605	49.2	+0.0
Turnout		5,288	57.1	+0.4
Conservative hold		Swing		

=== May 2002 ===
2002
Party	Candidate	Votes	%	±%
Conservative	Marie Harney*	3,345	63.9	−9.1
Labour	Helen Walsh	771	14.7	+2.4
Liberal Democrats	Roger Legge	762	14.6	+0.0
Green	Bridget Green	359	6.9	+6.9
Majority		2,574	49.2	−9.2
Turnout		5,237	56.7	+24.2
Conservative hold		Swing		

=== May 2000 ===
2000
Party	Candidate	Votes	%	±%
Conservative	David Merrell*	2,219	73.0	+3.5
Liberal Democrats	Christine Musgrove	445	14.6	+1.1
Labour	Peter Dunnico	375	12.3	−4.8
Majority		1,774	58.4	+6.0
Turnout		3,039	32.5	−0.4
Conservative hold		Swing		

== Elections in 1990s ==
1999
Party	Candidate	Votes	%	±%
Conservative	Poole*	2,145	69.5	+3.2
Labour	Monkhouse	527	17.1	+1.3
Liberal Democrats	Musgrove	416	13.5	−4.4
Majority		1,618	52.4	+4.0
Turnout		3,088	32.9	+0.2
Conservative hold		Swing		

1998
Party	Candidate	Votes	%	±%
Conservative	M. C. Harney*	2,042	66.3	+5.0
Liberal Democrats	C. Musgrove	550	17.9	−1.1
Labour	R. G. Monkhouse	486	15.8	−4.0
Majority		1,492	48.4	+6.9
Turnout		3,078	32.7	−5.5
Conservative hold		Swing		

1996
Party	Candidate	Votes	%	±%
Conservative	D. Merrell*	2,150	61.3	+1.1
Labour	M. A. Busteed	692	19.8	−3.1
Liberal Democrats	R. M. Elliott	668	19.0	+2.1
Majority		1,458	41.5	+4.3
Turnout		3,510	38.2	−0.2
Conservative hold		Swing		

1995
Party	Candidate	Votes	%	±%
Conservative	S. Poole*	2,139	60.2	+8.1
Labour	H. F. Busteed	815	22.9	+2.0
Liberal Democrats	J. Preston	602	16.9	−10.1
Majority		1,324	37.2	+12.1
Turnout		3,556	38.4	−3.0
Conservative hold		Swing		

1994
Party	Candidate	Votes	%	±%
Conservative	M. C. Harney*	2,018	52.1	−21.6
Liberal Democrats	N. S. Harrison	1,046	27.0	+12.0
Labour	H. F. Busteed	809	20.9	+9.6
Majority		972	25.1	−33.6
Turnout		3,873	41.4	+1.6
Conservative hold		Swing		

1992
Party	Candidate	Votes	%	±%
Conservative	D. Merrell*	2,576	73.7	+6.6
Liberal Democrats	J. Preston	525	15.0	−1.5
Labour	H. F. Busteed	395	11.3	−1.8
Majority		2,051	58.7	−8.1
Turnout		3,496	39.8	−5.3
Conservative hold		Swing		

1991
Party	Candidate	Votes	%	±%
Conservative	S. Poole*	2,676	67.1	+1.7
Liberal Democrats	J. Preston	657	16.5	+5.1
Labour	S. Hesford	521	13.1	−5.3
Green	M. R. Rowtham	133	3.3	−1.7
Majority		2,019	50.6	+28.5
Turnout		3,987	45.1	−3.3
Conservative hold		Swing		

1990 (2 vacancies)
Party	Candidate	Votes	%	±%
Conservative	M. C. Harney*	2,671	33.4	−4.0
Conservative	S. Poole	2,561	32.0	−6.8
Labour	H. F. Busteed	794	9.9	+7.8
Labour	S. Hinder	679	8.5	+5.0
Liberal Democrats	G. P. Pawson	492	6.2	−1.2
Green	B. J. Edwards	401	5.0	+1.5
Liberal Democrats	J. Preston	394	4.9	−3.8
Majority		1,767	22.1	−35.2
Turnout		7,992	48.4	+5.4
Conservative hold		Swing		
Conservative hold		Swing		

== Elections in 1980s ==
By-Election 15 June 1989
Party	Candidate	Votes	%	±%
Conservative	M. C. Harney	2,582	59.6	−11.2
Labour	H. F. Busteed	674	15.6	+3.6
Liberal Democrats	G. P. Pawson	567	13.1	−0.5
Green	M. R. Rowtham	506	11.7	+8.2
Majority		1,908	44.1	+3
Turnout		4,329	47.3	+14.3
Conservative hold		Swing		

1988
Party	Candidate	Votes	%	±%
Conservative	D. Merrell	2,790	70.8	+2.6
Liberal Democrats	V. A. Plummer	535	13.6	−6.7
Labour	B. Feeney	474	12.0	+3.4
Green	M. R. Rowtham	139	3.5	+0.6
Majority		2,255	57.3	+9.3
Turnout		3,938	43.0	−7.6
Conservative hold		Swing		

1987
Party	Candidate	Votes	%	±%
Conservative	G. Barker*	3,155	68.2	+8.0
SDP	V. G. O'Hara	938	20.3	−4.9
Labour	H. F. Busteed	398	8.6	−2.1
Green	M. R. Rowtham	132	2.9	−1.0
Majority		2,217	48.0	+13.0
Turnout		4,623	50.6	+5.7
Conservative hold		Swing		

1986
Party	Candidate	Votes	%	±%
Conservative	J. B. Gill*	2,449	60.2	−12.9
SDP	V. G. O'Hara	1,026	25.2	+25.2
Labour	M. J. Hendrickson	434	10.7	−6.2
Green	M. R. Rowtham	160	3.9	−6.1
Majority		1,423	35.0	−21.1
Turnout		4,069	44.9	−11.2
Conservative hold		Swing		

1984
Party	Candidate	Votes	%	±%
Conservative	B. S. Hall*	2,563	73.1	+5.2
Labour	J. B. Morton	594	16.9	+5.9
Ecology	J. S. Menzies	350	10.0	+10.0
Majority		1,969	56.1	+9.3
Turnout		3,507	39.6	−10.0
Conservative hold		Swing		

1983
Party	Candidate	Votes	%	±%
Conservative	G. Barker	2,956	67.9	+5.4
Alliance	A. P. Ratcliff	920	21.1	−9.2
Labour	J. A. Schoua	479	11.0	+3.8
Majority		2,036	46.8	+14.6
Turnout		4,355	49.6	+0.2
Conservative hold		Swing		

1982
Party	Candidate	Votes	%	±%
Conservative	J. B. Gill*	2,703	62.5	+2.0
SDP	D. L. Marlow	1,310	30.3	+30.3
Labour	T. A. O'Neill	312	7.2	−7.3
Majority		1,393	32.2	−3.3
Turnout		4,325	49.4	+2.5
Conservative hold		Swing		

1980
Party	Candidate	Votes	%	±%
Conservative	B. S. Hall*	2,473	60.5	−4.2
Liberal	R. B. Slack	1,022	25.0	+3.3
Labour	A. D. Johnson	592	14.5	+0.9
Majority		1,451	35.5	−7.5
Turnout		4,087	46.9	−30.0
Conservative hold		Swing		

== Elections in 1970s ==
1979
Party	Candidate	Votes	%	±%
Conservative	J. B. Humphreys*	3,721	64.7	−12.9
Liberal	J. A. Willmott	1,250	21.7	+9.4
Labour	A. D. Johnson	782	13.6	+3.5
Majority		2,471	43.0	−22.3
Turnout		5,753	76.9	+32.2
Conservative hold		Swing		

1978
Party	Candidate	Votes	%	±%
Conservative	J. B. Gill*	2,572	77.6	−7.1
Liberal	D. F. Mardon	408	12.3	−3.0
Labour	G. R. Scott	333	10.1	+10.1
Majority		2,164	65.3	−4.0
Turnout		3,313	44.7	−3.9
Conservative hold		Swing		

1976
Party	Candidate	Votes	%	±%
Conservative	B. S. Hall*	2,948	84.7	+12.8
Labour	J. Wynne	534	15.3	+2.7
Majority		2,414	69.3	+13.0
Turnout		3,482	48.6	−1.3
Conservative hold		Swing		

1975
Party	Candidate	Votes	%	±%
Conservative	J. B. Humphreys*	2,520	71.9	
Liberal	G. M. R. Willmott	545	15.5	
Labour	A. D. Johnson	440	12.6	
Majority		1,975	56.3	
Turnout		3,505	49.9	
Conservative hold		Swing		

1973
Party	Candidate	Votes	%	±%
Conservative	J. B. Gill	2,442	56.0	
Conservative	B. M. Hall	2,332		
Conservative	J. B. Humphreys	2,262		
Liberal	F. Vickery	1,213	27.8	
Labour	A. Johnson	702	16.1	
Labour	J. Kill	543		
Labour	A. Duxbury	487		
Majority		1,049		
Turnout		4,357	47.2	
Conservative win (new seat)				
Conservative win (new seat)				
Conservative win (new seat)				
