= 1982 Trafford Metropolitan Borough Council election =

1982 UK local government election

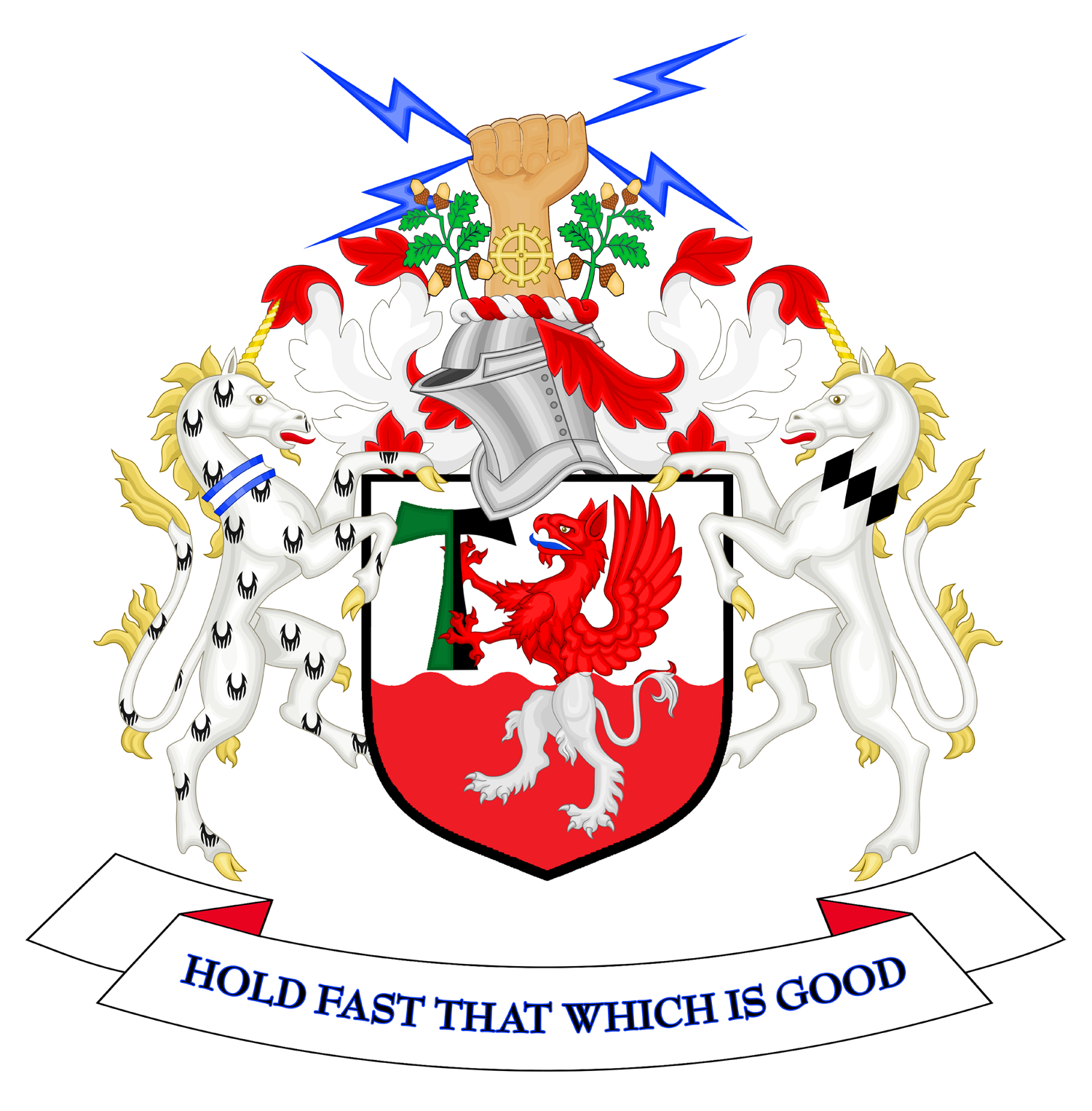
- 6 May 1982

22 of 63 seats to Trafford Metropolitan Borough Council 32 seats needed for a majority
	First party	Second party	Third party
Leader	Mike King	Richard Mee	John Phillipson
Party	Conservative	Labour	Alliance
Leader's seat	St. Martin's	Sale Moor	Priory
Last election	9 seats, 41.9%	11 seats, 40.4%	2 seats, 17.7%
Seats before	37	21	5
Seats won	15	5	2
Seats after	34	22	7
Seat change	▼3	▲1	▲2
Popular vote	36,657	20,968	21,892
Percentage	46.1%	26.4%	27.5%
Swing	▲4.2%	▼14.0%	▲9.8%
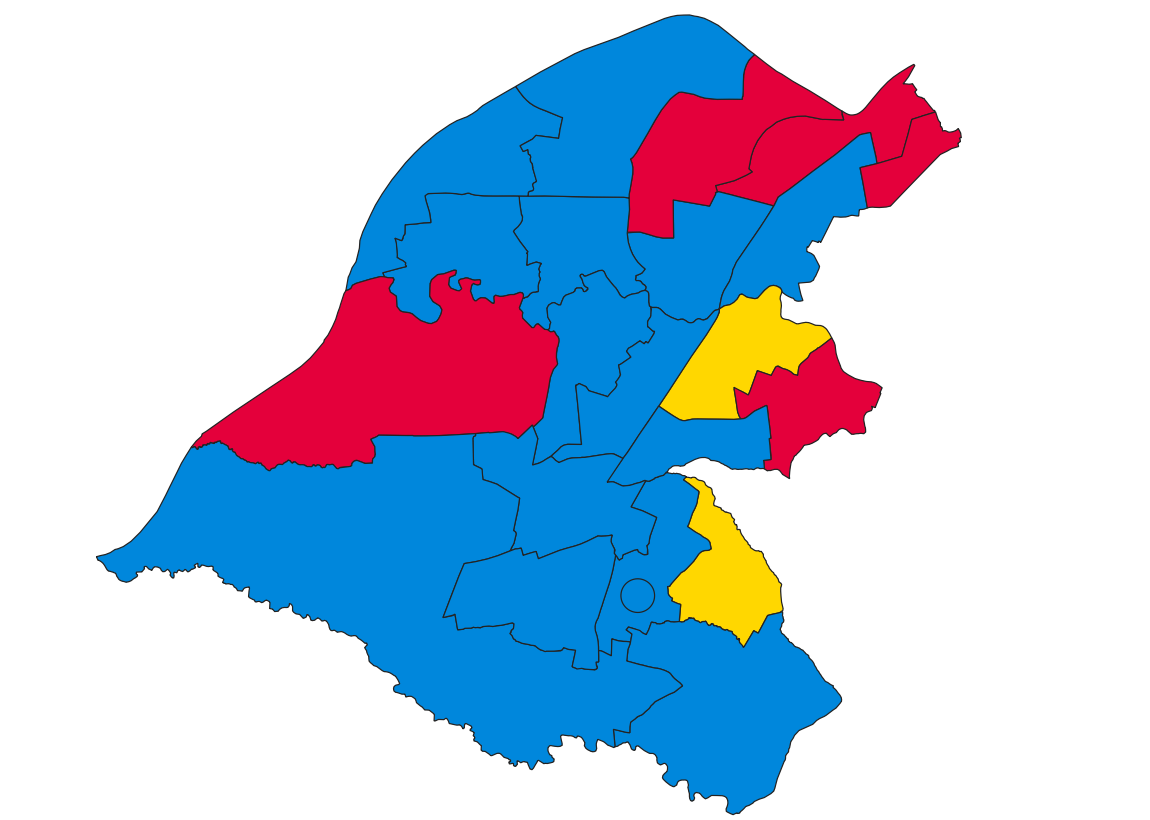
- Map of results of 1982 election
Leader of the Council before election
Jonathan Taylor
Conservative
Leader of the Council after election
Mike King
Conservative

Elections to Trafford Council were held on Thursday, 6 May 1982. One third of the council was up for election, with each successful candidate to serve a four-year term of office, expiring in 1986. The Conservative Party retained overall control of the council.

== Election result ==
Party	Votes		Seats			Full Council	
Conservative Party	36,657 (46.1%)	▲4.2	15 (68.2%)	15 / 22	▼3	34 (54.0%)	34 / 63
Labour Party	20,968 (26.4%)	▼14.0	5 (22.7%)	5 / 22	▲1	22 (34.9%)	22 / 63
Alliance	21,892 (27.5%)	▲9.8	2 (9.1%)	2 / 22	▲2	7 (11.1%)	7 / 63

↓
22	7	34

== Ward results ==
=== Altrincham ===
Altrincham
Party	Candidate	Votes	%	±%
Conservative	B. L. Slater	1,632	48.9	+3.3
SDP	G. E. Evans	901	27.0	+27.0
Labour	J. Koch	803	24.1	−12.7
Majority		731	21.9	+19.2
Turnout		3,336	41.6	+1.8
Conservative hold		Swing		

=== Bowdon ===
Bowdon
Party	Candidate	Votes	%	±%
Conservative	J. B. Gill*	2,703	62.5	+2.0
SDP	D. L. Marlow	1,310	30.3	+30.3
Labour	T. A. O'Neill	312	7.2	−7.3
Majority		1,393	32.2	−3.3
Turnout		4,325	49.4	+2.5
Conservative hold		Swing		

=== Broadheath ===
Broadheath
Party	Candidate	Votes	%	±%
Conservative	M. G. Currie*	1,633	44.7	+3.8
SDP	M. J. Roberts	1,012	27.7	+27.7
Labour	N. P. Cooper	1,009	27.6	−16.5
Majority		621	17.0	+13.8
Turnout		3,654	45.8	+3.8
Conservative hold		Swing		

=== Brooklands ===
Brooklands
Party	Candidate	Votes	%	±%
Conservative	J. A. E. Waterfall*	2,489	63.4	+10.9
Liberal	C. A. Bearfield	1,000	25.5	−9.4
Labour	H. Davies	437	11.1	−1.5
Majority		1,489	37.9	+20.3
Turnout		3,926	49.1	−1.1
Conservative hold		Swing		

=== Bucklow ===
Bucklow
Party	Candidate	Votes	%	±%
Labour	F. Holland*	1,533	62.7	−17.7
Conservative	M. E. Hindley	482	19.7	+6.7
SDP	A. P. Ratcliff	429	17.6	+17.6
Majority		1,051	43.0	−24.4
Turnout		2,444	34.8	−1.6
Labour hold		Swing		

=== Clifford ===
Clifford
Party	Candidate	Votes	%	±%
Labour	P. J. Geoghegan	1,830	53.8	−12.9
Conservative	G. V. Burrows	1,063	31.3	−2.0
SDP	W. C. Sumner	506	14.9	+14.9
Majority		767	22.6	−10.8
Turnout		3,399	40.9	−2.3
Labour gain from Conservative		Swing		

=== Davyhulme East ===
Davyhulme East
Party	Candidate	Votes	%	±%
Conservative	R. G. Haigh*	1,806	45.9	+2.3
Labour	S. Rogers	1,191	30.2	−10.4
Liberal	J. A. Cottrell	941	23.9	+8.1
Majority		615	15.6	+12.6
Turnout		3,938	51.1	+8.7
Conservative hold		Swing		

=== Davyhulme West ===
Davyhulme West
Party	Candidate	Votes	%	±%
Conservative	J. T. Lamb	1,781	44.9	+7.1
Labour	A. G. Hodson	1,168	29.4	−9.3
SDP	H. Laffey	1,020	25.7	+25.7
Majority		613	15.4	+14.5
Turnout		3,969	47.5	+3.0
Conservative hold		Swing		

=== Flixton ===
Flixton
Party	Candidate	Votes	%	±%
Conservative	C. A. Lord	1,856	44.5	+6.3
Liberal	A. Vernon	1,585	38.0	+5.8
Labour	H. Pollard	726	17.4	−16.5
Majority		271	6.5	+2.2
Turnout		4,167	52.5	+3.7
Conservative hold		Swing		

=== Hale ===
Hale
Party	Candidate	Votes	%	±%
Conservative	M. Hinchcliffe*	2,709	66.1	−3.1
Liberal	J. Wilson	1,134	27.7	+5.0
Labour	E. A. Starkey	253	6.2	−1.9
Majority		1,575	38.5	−8.0
Turnout		4,096	46.6	+3.2
Conservative hold		Swing		

=== Longford ===
Longford
Party	Candidate	Votes	%	±%
Conservative	K. G. Summerfield	1,638	45.4	+8.1
Labour	K. Silcock	1,488	41.2	−21.5
Liberal	W. A. Munden	483	13.4	+13.4
Majority		150	4.2	−21.2
Turnout		3,609	46.2	−0.7
Conservative hold		Swing		

=== Mersey-St. Mary's ===
Mersey St. Marys
Party	Candidate	Votes	%	±%
Conservative	S. A. Elder	2,510	62.3	+10.4
SDP	E. P. M. Wollaston	1,004	24.9	+24.9
Labour	B. R. Coates	515	12.8	−8.6
Majority		1,506	37.4	+12.2
Turnout		4,029	42.4	−4.2
Conservative hold		Swing		

=== Park ===
Park
Party	Candidate	Votes	%	±%
Labour	J. R. Haydock*	1,046	41.5	−23.5
Conservative	F. D. Redfern	998	39.6	+5.9
Liberal	C. R. Hedley	475	18.9	+18.9
Majority		48	1.9	−29.4
Turnout		2,519	38.5	−4.4
Labour hold		Swing		

=== Priory ===
Priory
Party	Candidate	Votes	%	±%
Liberal	A. L. Brookes	1,389	43.9	+1.5
Conservative	A. Rhodes	1,297	41.0	+5.6
Labour	P. N. J. Frizzby	478	15.1	−7.1
Majority		92	2.9	−4.1
Turnout		3,164	39.6	−3.5
Liberal gain from Conservative		Swing		

=== Sale Moor ===
Sale Moor
Party	Candidate	Votes	%	±%
Labour	R. Mee*	1,319	40.0	−10.9
Conservative	J. W. Robinson	1,152	34.9	+4.3
Liberal	H. M. Hughes	827	25.1	+6.6
Majority		167	5.1	−15.1
Turnout		3,298	42.3	−2.1
Labour hold		Swing		

=== St. Martin's ===
St. Martins
Party	Candidate	Votes	%	±%
Conservative	M. E. King*	1,748	43.2	+3.7
Labour	G. H. Mountain	1,464	36.1	−24.4
SDP	R. C. Tweed	838	20.7	+20.7
Majority		284	7.0	−14.0
Turnout		4,050	43.3	+1.6
Conservative hold		Swing		

=== Stretford ===
Stretford
Party	Candidate	Votes	%	±%
Conservative	M. Hindley*	1,886	51.3	+5.9
Labour	G. Woodburn	1,107	30.2	−24.4
SDP	L. L. Sumner	679	18.5	+18.5
Majority		779	21.3	+12.1
Turnout		3,664	44.6	+1.3
Conservative hold		Swing		

=== Talbot ===
Talbot
Party	Candidate	Votes	%	±%
Labour	G. Marland*	1,721	58.6	−15.8
Conservative	B. M. Dirikis	750	25.5	−0.1
SDP	S. Everett	467	15.9	+15.9
Majority		971	33.0	−15.8
Turnout		2,938	39.0	−0.1
Labour hold		Swing		

=== Timperley ===
Timperley (2 vacancies)
Party	Candidate	Votes	%	±%
Conservative	A. K. Davies	1,778	43.7	0
Conservative	L. W. Hillier	1,698	41.7	−2.0
Liberal	G. K. Stuart	1,695	41.6	+5.6
Liberal	J. R. Richardson	1,595	39.2	+3.2
Labour	R. J. Short	441	10.8	−9.5
Labour	R. P. F. Phillips	412	10.1	−10.2
Majority		3	0.1	−7.6
Turnout		4,071	45.4	+4.2
Conservative hold		Swing		
Conservative hold		Swing		

=== Urmston ===
Urmston
Party	Candidate	Votes	%	±%
Conservative	A. R. Coupe*	1,736	46.7	−1.1
Labour	D. Acton	994	26.8	−25.4
SDP	P. J. Carlon	985	26.5	+26.5
Majority		742	20.0	+15.7
Turnout		3,715	47.5	+5.3
Conservative hold		Swing		

=== Village ===
Village
Party	Candidate	Votes	%	±%
Liberal	B. V. Ackroyd	1,617	44.3	+7.8
Conservative	W. J. Watkins*	1,312	35.9	+2.1
Labour	R. Crewe	721	19.8	−9.9
Majority		305	8.4	+5.6
Turnout		3,650	43.3	−6.9
Liberal gain from Conservative		Swing		

== By-elections between 1983 and 1983 ==
Timperley By-Election 8 July 1982
Party	Candidate	Votes	%	±%
Conservative	W. J. Watkins	1,433	47.3	−1.7
Liberal	G. K. Stuart	1,388	45.8	−2.6
Labour	R. J. Short	208	6.9	+4.3
Majority		45	1.5	+1.4
Turnout		3,029	33.8	−11.6
Conservative hold		Swing		
