= 2026 Trafford Council election =

2026 English local government election

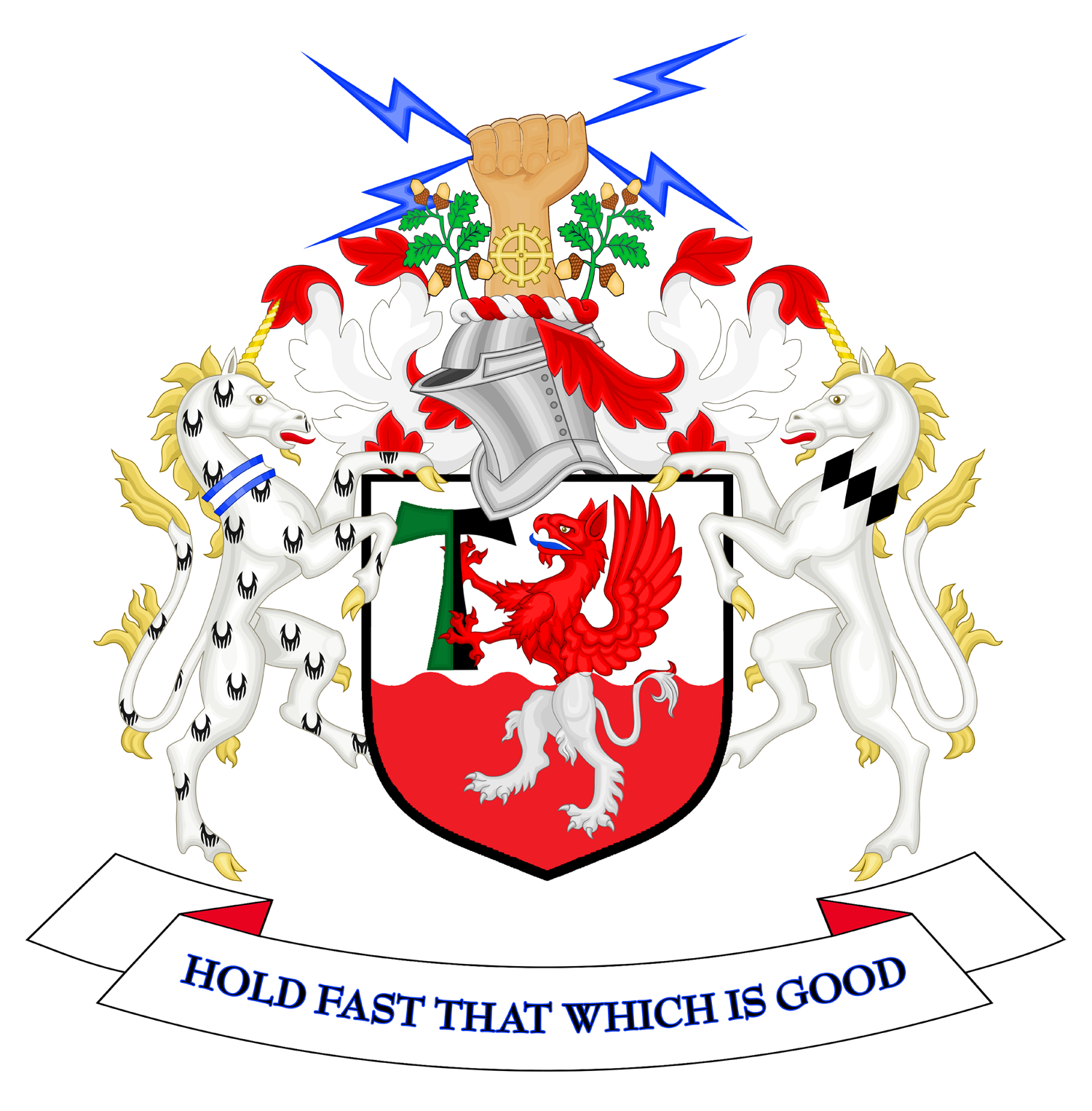
- 7 May 2026

21 out of 63 seats to Trafford Council 32 seats needed for a majority
- Registered: 176,502
- Turnout: 86,312; 48.9%
	First party	Second party	Third party
Leader	Tom Ross	Nathan Evans	Geraldine Coggins
Party	Labour	Conservative	Green
Leader's seat	Stretford & Humphrey Park	Hale Barns & Timperley South	Altrincham
Last election	43 seats, 41.9%	8 seats, 25.2%	6 seats, 17.8%
Seats before	41	10	5
Seats won	8	5	4
Seats after	35	12	7
Seat change	▼6	▲2	▲2
Popular vote	20,070	19,954	20,167
Percentage	23.3%	23.2%	23.4%
Swing	▼18.6%	▼2.0%	▲5.6%
	Fourth party	Fifth party
Leader	Shaun Ennis	None
Party	Liberal Democrats	Reform
Leader's seat	Timperley Central
Last election	6 seats, 11.4%	0 seats, 2.3%
Seats before	7	0
Seats won	2	2
Seats after	7	2
Seat change	0	▲2
Popular vote	9,083	16,355
Percentage	10.6%	19.0%
Swing	▼0.8%	▲16.7%
- Winner of each seat at the 2026 Trafford Council election.
Leader before election
Tom Ross
Labour
Leader after election
Tom Ross
Labour

The 2026 Trafford Council elections were held on Thursday, 7 May 2026 alongside other local elections in the United Kingdom. 21 of the 63 seats were contested, with each successful candidate elected to serve a four-year term of office expiring in 2030.

The Green Party won the most votes, with Labour and the Conservatives very closely behind (all around 23%). Labour retained overall control of the council, but with a reduced majority.

== Council composition ==
After 2024 election		Before 2026 election	
Party	Seats	Party	Seats
Labour	43	Labour	41
Conservative	8	Conservative	10
Liberal Democrats	6	Liberal Democrats	7
Green	6	Green	5

Changes 2024–2026:

- July 2025: Ulrich Savary (Labour) leaves party to sit as an independent
- August 2025: Denise Western (Labour) dies – by-election held October 2025
- September 2025: Ulrich Savary (Independent) joins Liberal Democrats
- October 2025:
  - Kaushik Chakraborty (Conservative) gains by-election from Labour
  - Owain Sutton (Green) resigns – by-election held November 2025
- November 2025: Natalie Shalom (Conservative) gains by-election from Greens

== Background ==
The Local Government Act 1972 created a two-tier system of metropolitan counties and districts covering Greater Manchester, Merseyside, South Yorkshire, Tyne and Wear, the West Midlands, and West Yorkshire starting in 1974. Trafford was a district of the Greater Manchester metropolitan county. The Local Government Act 1985 abolished the metropolitan counties, with metropolitan districts taking on most of their powers as metropolitan boroughs. The Greater Manchester Combined Authority was created in 2011 and began electing the mayor of Greater Manchester from 2017, which was given strategic powers covering a region coterminous with the former Greater Manchester metropolitan county.

In June 2022, the Local Government Boundary Commission for England made The Trafford (Electoral Changes) Order 2022, which officially abolished all 21 existing wards and established 21 new wards with new boundaries. All 63 Council seats were contested at the 2023 elections. The elected councillor who received the second-highest number of votes in each ward at the 2023 election had their seat contested in this election.

== Electoral process ==
The council elects its councillors in thirds, with a third being up for election every year for three years, with no election in the fourth year. The election will take place by first-past-the-post voting, with wards being represented by three councillors, with one elected in each election year to serve a four-year term.

All registered electors (British, Irish, Commonwealth and European Union citizens) living in Trafford aged 18 or over were entitled to vote in the election. People who lived at two addresses in different local authorities, such as university students with different term-time and holiday addresses, were entitled to be registered for elections in both local authorities. Voting in-person at polling stations will take place from 07:00 to 22:00 on election day, with voters able to apply for postal votes or proxy votes in advance of the election.

== Election result ==
Party	Votes		Seats			Full Council	
Green Party	20,167 (23.4%)	▲5.6	4 (19.0%)	4 / 21	▲2	7 (11.1%)	7 / 63
Labour Party	20,070 (23.3%)	▼18.6	8 (38.1%)	8 / 21	▼6	35 (55.6%)	35 / 63
Conservative Party	19,954 (23.2%)	▼2.0	5 (23.8%)	5 / 21	▲2	12 (19.0%)	12 / 63
Reform UK	16,355 (19.0%)	▲16.7	2 (9.5%)	2 / 21	▲2	2 (3.2%)	2 / 63
Liberal Democrats	9,083 (10.6%)	▼0.8	2 (9.5%)	2 / 21	Steady	7 (11.1%)	7 / 63
Advance UK	205 (0.2%)	N/A	0 (0.0%)	0 / 21	N.A	0 (0.0%)	0 / 63
SDP	145 (0.2%)	N/A	0 (0.0%)	0 / 21	N/A	0 (0.0%)	0 / 63
Independent	109 (0.1%)	▼1.1	0 (0.0%)	0 / 21	Steady	0 (0.0%)	0 / 63

↓
7	35	7	12	2

== Incumbents ==
Ward	Incumbent councillor	Party	Re-standing
Altrincham	Daniel Jerrome	Green	Yes
Ashton upon Mersey	Ben Hartley	Labour	Yes
Bowdon	Shengke Zhi	Conservative	Yes
Broadheath	Amy Whyte	Labour	No
Brooklands	Rose Thompson	Labour	Yes
Bucklow-St Martin's	Aidan Williams	Labour	Yes
Davyhulme	Karina Carter	Labour	Yes
Flixton	Dolores O'Sullivan	Labour	Yes
Gorse Hill & Cornbrook	Fianna Hornby	Labour	Yes
Hale	Hannah Spencer	Green	No
Hale Barns & Timperley South	Nathan Evans	Conservative	Yes
Longford	Judith Lloyd	Labour	Yes
Lostock & Barton	Mike Cordingley	Labour	No
Manor	John Holden	Conservative	No
Old Trafford	Emma Hirst	Labour	No
Sale Central	Eve Parker	Labour	Yes
Sale Moor	Liz Patel	Labour	Yes
Stretford & Humphrey Park	Jane Slater	Labour	Yes
Timperley Central	Julian Newgrosh	Liberal Democrats	Yes
Timperley North	Will Frass	Liberal Democrats	Yes
Urmston	Catherine Hynes	Labour	No

== Ward results ==
=== Altrincham ===
Altrincham
Party	Candidate	Votes	%	±%
Green	Dan Jerrome*	1,744	44.1	−12.9
Conservative	Nick Dean	1,099	27.8	+3.9
Reform	Stuart Niven	556	14.1	N/A
Labour	Mark Nesbitt	363	9.2	−6.1
Liberal Democrats	Donald McIntosh	180	4.6	+1.6
Majority		645	16.3	−16.7
Rejected ballots		12	0.4	-0.4
Turnout		3,955	48.6	+5.6
Registered electors		8,131		
Green hold		Swing	-8.4	

=== Ashton upon Mersey ===
Ashton upon Mersey
Party	Candidate	Votes	%	±%
Labour	Ben Hartley*	1,476	34.4	−19.7
Conservative	Christopher Halliday	1,038	24.2	−2.3
Green	Diane Plunkett	801	18.7	+5.8
Reform	Luke Sowerby	683	15.9	N/A
Liberal Democrats	Jonathan Bevan	283	6.6	+1.4
Majority		438	10.2	−17.4
Rejected ballots		6	0.1	-1.2
Turnout		4,287	55.4	+9.6
Registered electors		7,732		
Labour hold		Swing	-8.7	

=== Bowdon ===
Bowdon
Party	Candidate	Votes	%	±%
Conservative	Shengke Zhi*	2,616	54.3	+11.4
Green	Bridget Green	1,424	29.6	−12.8
Reform	Michelle McCusker	445	9.2	+4.9
Labour	Kate Lamerton	203	4.2	−3.8
Liberal Democrats	Ludo Tolhurst-Cleaver	105	2.2	+0.2
Advance UK	Ron Hutton	11	0.2	N/A
Majority		1,192	24.7	+24.2
Rejected ballots		12	0.2	-0.1
Turnout		4,817	56.3	+8.4
Registered electors		8,558		
Conservative hold		Swing	+12.1	

=== Broadheath ===
Broadheath
Party	Candidate	Votes	%	±%
Conservative	Prakash Nathani	1,721	35.6	−5.4
Labour	Javed Khwaja	1,018	21.1	−20.0
Liberal Democrats	Barbara Gerard	842	17.4	+13.1
Reform	Terence Charnock	704	14.6	+9.3
Green	Alexander Young	504	10.4	+3.9
Independent	Stephen Farndon	33	0.7	−0.6
Majority		703	14.6	
Rejected ballots		5	0.1	-0.3
Turnout		4,829	53.7	+6.3
Registered electors		8,988		
Conservative gain from Labour		Swing	+7.3	

=== Brooklands ===
Brooklands
Party	Candidate	Votes	%	±%
Labour	Rose Thompson*	1,417	31.9	−15.4
Conservative	Bheem Pulla	1,149	25.9	−4.9
Reform	John Churchill	811	18.3	+11.7
Green	Renate Aspden	783	17.7	+8.5
Liberal Democrats	Pauline Cliff	262	5.9	+0.2
Majority		268	6.0	−10.5
Rejected ballots		11	0.2	-0.3
Turnout		4,436	56.6	+6.9
Registered electors		7,837		
Labour hold		Swing	-5.3	

=== Bucklow-St. Martin's ===
Bucklow-St. Martin's
Party	Candidate	Votes	%	±%
Reform	Charlotte Waterworth	1,226	43.5	N/A
Labour	Aidan Williams*	618	21.9	−39.6
Green	George Speight	412	14.6	+3.6
Conservative	Itsvan Toth	314	11.1	−9.6
Liberal Democrats	Margaret Boysen	173	6.1	−0.5
Advance UK	Paul Swansborough	69	2.4	N/A
Majority		608	21.6	
Rejected ballots		8	0.3	-2.0
Turnout		2,820	34.7	+9.9
Registered electors		8,135		
Reform gain from Labour		Swing	+41.6	

=== Davyhulme ===
Davyhulme
Party	Candidate	Votes	%	±%
Reform	Billy Burke	1,294	30.0	N/A
Labour	Karina Carter*	1,283	29.7	−23.1
Conservative	Jonathan Coupe	811	18.8	−8.5
Green	Kevin Chatterton	665	15.4	+5.4
Liberal Democrats	Briony Stephenson	214	5.0	+0.7
Advance UK	Gary Regan	36	0.8	N/A
Majority		11	0.3	
Rejected ballots		16	0.4	-0.1
Turnout		4,319	48.6	+10.6
Registered electors		8,879		
Reform gain from Labour		Swing	+26.6	

=== Flixton ===
Flixton
Party	Candidate	Votes	%	±%
Labour	Dolores O'Sullivan*	1,314	29.6	−26.7
Reform	Mark Ormiston	1,291	29.0	N/A
Green	Katrin Cotter	812	18.3	+5.9
Conservative	Paul Lally	746	16.8	−4.1
Liberal Democrats	Tim Kinsella	241	5.4	+1.6
Advance UK	Andrew Beaumont	32	0.7	N/A
Majority		23	0.6	−34.8
Rejected ballots		9	0.2	-0.7
Turnout		4,445	51.6	+11.4
Registered electors		8,616		
Labour hold		Swing	-27.9	

=== Gorse Hill & Cornbrook ===
Gorse Hill & Cornbrook
Party	Candidate	Votes	%	±%
Green	Aaron Fradley	1,417	44.1	+27.9
Labour	Fianna Hornby*	943	29.4	−30.8
Reform	Bill Sumner	515	16.0	N/A
Conservative	Stuart Donnelly	199	6.2	−5.4
Liberal Democrats	Dawn Carberry-Power	125	3.9	+0.2
Majority		474	14.7	
Rejected ballots		11	0.3	-0.9
Turnout		3,210	35.5	+5.1
Registered electors		9,044		
Green gain from Labour		Swing	+29.4	

=== Hale ===
Hale
Party	Candidate	Votes	%	±%
Conservative	Rupert Kelly	1,941	45.2	+8.7
Green	Orla Weir	1,571	36.6	−10.7
Reform	Richard Shean	346	8.1	N/A
Labour	Seth Champion	271	6.3	−5.5
Liberal Democrats	Jason Stack	162	3.8	+0.2
Majority		370	8.6	
Rejected ballots		6	0.1	-0.6
Turnout		4,297	54.2	+6.8
Registered electors		7,928		
Conservative gain from Green		Swing	+9.7	

=== Hale Barns & Timperley South ===
Hale Barns & Timperley South
Party	Candidate	Votes	%	±%
Conservative	Nathan Evans*	2,138	51.6	+8.6
Liberal Democrats	Matt Sellars	1,084	26.2	−7.2
Reform	Leslie Cupitt	431	10.4	+4.2
Green	Centaine Parker	299	7.2	+0.3
Labour	Isaac Jones	183	4.4	−6.0
Majority		1,054	25.4	+15.8
Rejected ballots		8	0.2	-0.3
Turnout		4,144	54.2	+11.2
Registered electors		7,647		
Conservative hold		Swing	+7.9	

=== Longford ===
Longford
Party	Candidate	Votes	%	±%
Green	Gareth Twose	1,719	46.6	+24.6
Labour	Judith Lloyd*	1,196	32.4	−24.7
Reform	Charles Rear	399	10.8	N/A
Conservative	Christopher Boyes	242	6.6	−3.2
Liberal Democrats	Anna Fryer	127	3.4	−3.9
Majority		523	14.2	
Rejected ballots		7	0.2	-0.7
Turnout		3,690	44.9	+7.9
Registered electors		8,220		
Green gain from Labour		Swing	+24.7	

=== Lostock & Barton ===
Lostock & Barton
Party	Candidate	Votes	%	±%
Labour	Mark Tobin	1,068	30.9	−29.2
Reform	Ian Edwards	1,037	30.0	N/A
Green	Stephen Holman	700	20.2	+7.6
Conservative	Tracey Haworth	468	13.5	−7.7
Liberal Democrats	David Kierman	178	5.1	+0.3
Majority		31	0.9	−38.0
Rejected ballots		9	0.3	-1.0
Turnout		3,460	42.2	+8.6
Registered electors		8,205		
Labour hold		Swing	-29.6	

=== Manor ===
Manor
Party	Candidate	Votes	%	±%
Conservative	Rupali Paul	2,037	46.8	+7.0
Reform	Dan Barker	827	19.0	+12.5
Labour	Gawain Glenton	803	18.4	−22.3
Green	James McGlashan	528	12.1	+3.3
Liberal Democrats	Simon Wright	145	3.3	−0.4
Majority		1,210	27.8	+27.7
Rejected ballots		13	0.3	-0.1
Turnout		4,355	50.6	+10.2
Registered electors		8,616		
Conservative hold		Swing	+25.8	

=== Old Trafford ===
Old Trafford
Party	Candidate	Votes	%	±%
Green	Jennie Wadsworth	1,952	52.5	+21.8
Labour	Mahvish Masood	1,338	36.0	−22.9
Reform	Alan Cowell	160	4.3	N/A
Conservative	Diane Coupe	142	3.8	−0.6
Liberal Democrats	Andy Hick	118	3.2	−0.8
Majority		614	16.5	
Rejected ballots		10	0.3	-1.7
Turnout		3,720	42.2	+3.5
Registered electors		8,817		
Green gain from Labour		Swing	+22.4	

=== Sale Central ===
Sale Central
Party	Candidate	Votes	%	±%
Labour	Eve Parker*	1,405	36.2	−23.7
Green	Teddy Somers	943	24.3	+14.9
Reform	Stephen Ardern	571	14.7	N/A
Conservative	Kameswari Achanta	521	13.4	−7.7
Liberal Democrats	Joe Kramer	279	7.2	−1.4
SDP	Hilary Salt	145	3.7	N/A
Majority		462	11.9	−26.9
Rejected ballots		18	0.5	-0.4
Turnout		3,882	50.1	+5.3
Registered electors		7,746		
Labour hold		Swing	-19.3	

=== Sale Moor ===
Sale Moor
Party	Candidate	Votes	%	±%
Labour	Liz Patel*	1,471	36.8	−21.1
Reform	James McCullough	985	24.6	N/A
Green	Chris Hargreaves	786	19.7	+7.4
Conservative	Kishorchandra Patil	533	13.3	−9.3
Liberal Democrats	James Miller	208	5.2	−0.8
Majority		486	12.2	−23.1
Rejected ballots		13	0.3	-0.9
Turnout		3,998	47.9	+8.5
Registered electors		8,343		
Labour hold		Swing	+1.2	

=== Stretford & Humphrey Park ===
Stretford & Humphrey Park
Party	Candidate	Votes	%	±%
Labour	Jane Slater*	1,380	32.2	−26.8
Green	Daniel Bowdler	1,264	29.5	+11.4
Reform	Jamie Hook	1,033	24.1	N/A
Conservative	Syeda Rizvi	360	8.4	−8.2
Liberal Democrats	Stephen Power	161	3.8	−0.8
Independent	Hazel Gibb-Shacklock	76	1.8	N/A
Majority		116	2.7	−38.2
Rejected ballots		14	0.3	-1.4
Turnout		4,288	48.1	+8.9
Registered electors		8,910		
Labour hold		Swing	-19.1	

=== Timperley Central ===
Timperley Central
Party	Candidate	Votes	%	±%
Liberal Democrats	Julian Newgrosh*	1,693	39.0	−10.7
Reform	Philip Holt	1,081	24.9	+18.1
Conservative	Vineeta Chouhan	765	17.6	−3.0
Green	James Brooke-Taylor	475	10.9	+5.4
Labour	Barbara Twiney	325	7.5	−9.6
Majority		612	14.1	−15.0
Rejected ballots		5	0.1	-0.6
Turnout		4,344	50.3	+7.3
Registered electors		8,644		
Liberal Democrats hold		Swing	-14.4	

=== Timperley North ===
Timperley North
Party	Candidate	Votes	%	±%
Liberal Democrats	Will Frass*	2,276	48.5	−9.5
Reform	Anthony Shaw	830	17.7	N/A
Conservative	Angela Bruer-Morris	646	13.8	−2.1
Green	Aagash Vadera	471	10.0	+3.6
Labour	Jo Sharpe	440	9.4	−9.4
Advance UK	Angela O'Neill	21	0.4	N/A
Majority		1,446	30.8	−8.4
Rejected ballots		10	0.2	-0.8
Turnout		4,694	53.4	+7.0
Registered electors		8,790		
Liberal Democrats hold		Swing	-13.6	

=== Urmston ===
Urmston
Party	Candidate	Votes	%	±%
Labour	Clare Sheridan	1,555	36.0	−21.1
Reform	Dave Stubbs	1,130	26.1	+18.1
Green	Steve Tennant	897	20.8	+10.6
Conservative	Ali Aydogdu	468	10.8	−2.8
Liberal Democrats	John Franklin-Johnston	227	5.3	+1.4
Advance UK	Paul Regan	36	0.8	N/A
Majority		425	9.8	−33.7
Rejected ballots		9	0.2	-0.4
Turnout		4,322	49.6	+9.1
Registered electors		8,716		
Labour hold		Swing	-19.6	
