= 2023 Trafford Metropolitan Borough Council election =

2023 local government election in Trafford

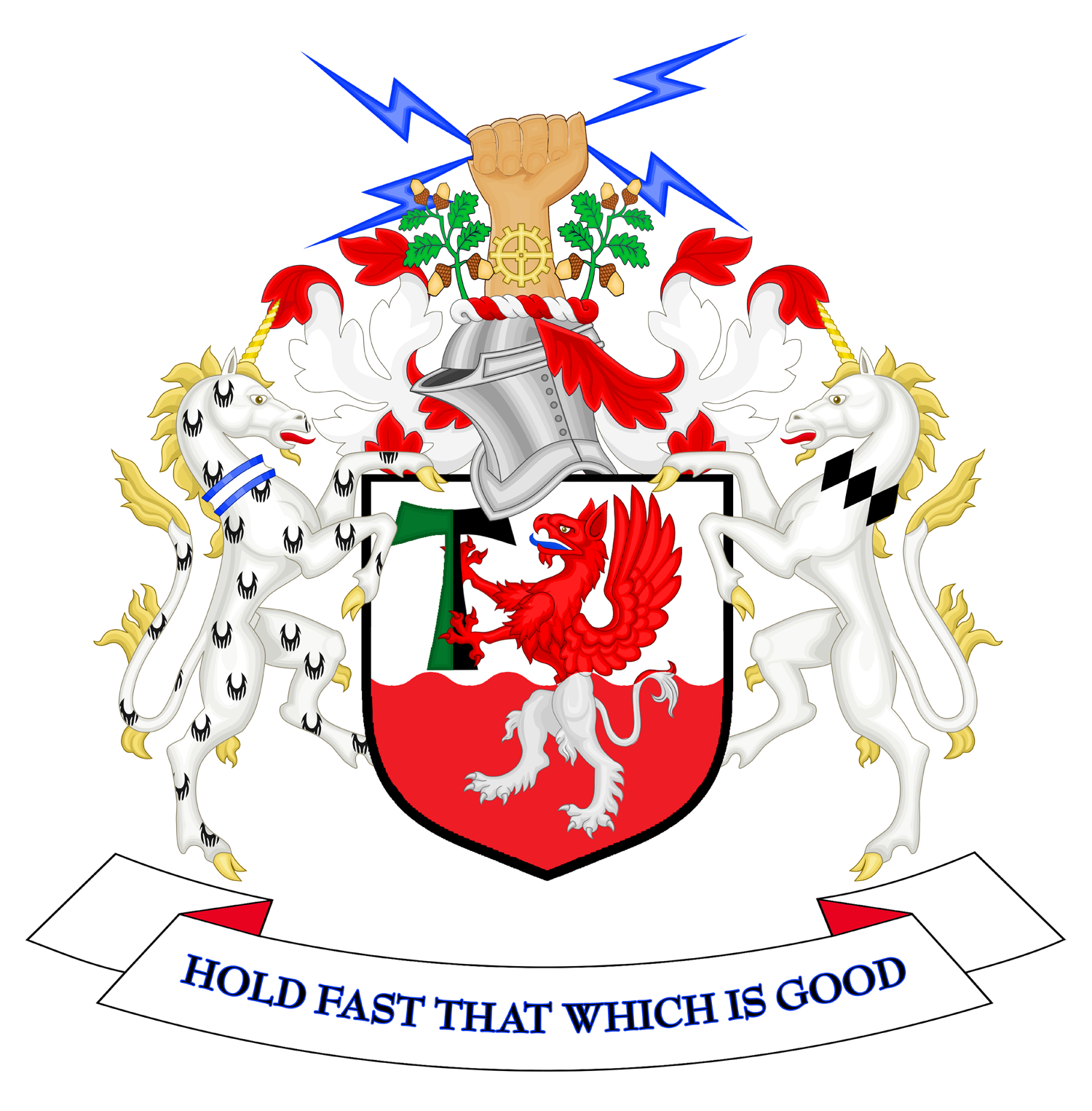
- 4 May 2023

All 63 seats up for election to Trafford Metropolitan Borough Council 32 seats needed for a majority
	First party	Second party	Third party
Leader	Tom Ross	Linda Blackburn	Dan Jerrome
Party	Labour	Conservative	Green
Leader's seat	Stretford and Humphrey Park	Village (stood down)	Altrincham
Last election	15 seats, 45.1%	3 seats, 30.6%	2 seats, 13.5%
Seats before	41	13	4
Seats won	41	10	6
Seats after	41	10	6
Seat change	Steady	▼3	▲2
Popular vote	83,275	53,111	29,619
Percentage	44.6%	28.4%	15.8%
Swing	▼0.5%	▼2.2%	▲2.3%
	Fourth party
Leader	Julian Newgrosh
Party	Liberal Democrats
Leader's seat	Timperley Central
Last election	2 seats, 10.1%
Seats before	5
Seats won	6
Seats after	6
Seat change	▲1
Popular vote	20,167
Percentage	10.8%
Swing	▲0.7%
- Map of results of 2023 election
Leader of the Council before election
Tom Ross
Labour
Leader of the Council after election
Tom Ross
Labour

The 2023 Trafford Metropolitan Borough Council elections took place on 4 May 2023 alongside other elections in the United Kingdom. Due to boundary changes, all 63 seats were contested.

Labour retained its majority on the council.

== Background ==
The Local Government Act 1972 created a two-tier system of metropolitan counties and districts covering Greater Manchester, Merseyside, South Yorkshire, Tyne and Wear, the West Midlands, and West Yorkshire starting in 1974. Trafford was a district of the Greater Manchester metropolitan county. The Local Government Act 1985 abolished the metropolitan counties, with metropolitan districts taking on most of their powers as metropolitan boroughs. The Greater Manchester Combined Authority was created in 2011 and began electing the mayor of Greater Manchester from 2017, which was given strategic powers covering a region coterminous with the former Greater Manchester metropolitan county.

Since its creation in 1974, the council has predominantly been controlled by the Conservative Party, with the Conservatives in power between 1973–85, 1988–94, and 2004–2018. The Labour Party was in control from 1996–2002, and from 2018 to the present. The rest of the time were periods of no overall control.

In December 2022, the leader of the council Andrew Western was elected as Member of Parliament for Stretford and Urmston. Western stood down as council leader in January 2023, with Tom Ross subsequently being elected as leader.

In June 2022, the Local Government Boundary Commission for England made The Trafford (Electoral Changes) Order 2022, which officially abolished the existing 21 wards and created 21 new wards with different boundaries. Because of this change, all 63 seats on the council, three per ward, were contested.

== Electoral process ==
The election took place using the plurality block voting system, a form of first-past-the-post voting, with each ward being represented by three councillors. The candidate with the most votes in each ward will serve a four year term ending in 2027, the second-placed candidate will serve a three year term anding in 2026 and the third-placed candidate will serve a one year term ending in 2024.

All registered electors (British, Irish, Commonwealth and European Union citizens) living in Trafford aged 18 or over were entitled to vote in the election. People who lived at two addresses in different councils, such as university students with different term-time and holiday addresses, were entitled to be registered for and vote in elections in both local authorities. Voting in-person at polling stations took place from 07:00 to 22:00 on election day, and voters were able to apply for postal votes or proxy votes in advance of the election.

== Election result ==
Party	Votes		Seats		
Labour Party	83,275 (44.6%)	▼0.6	41 (65.1%)	41 / 63	Steady
Conservative Party	53,111 (28.4%)	▼2.2	10 (15.9%)	10 / 63	▼3
Green Party	29,619 (15.8%)	▲2.3	6 (9.5%)	6 / 63	▲2
Liberal Democrats	20,167 (10.8%)	▲0.7	6 (9.5%)	6 / 63	▲1
Independent	401 (0.4%)	▼0.1	0 (0.0%)	0 / 63	Steady
Reform UK	281 (0.3%)	N/A	0 (0.0%)	0 / 63	N/A
Britain First	153 (0.2%)	N/A	0 (0.0%)	0 / 63	N/A
Women's Equality Party	107 (0.1%)	▼0.1	0 (0.0%)	0 / 63	Steady

↓
41	6	6	10

== Ward results ==
- Asterisks denote incumbent councillors seeking re-election.
- Double asterisk denote incumbent councillors seeking re-election in another ward

=== Altrincham ===
Altrincham (3)
Party	Candidate	Votes	%	±%
Green	Geraldine Coggins*	1,980	61.5	
Green	Dan Jerrome*	1,947	60.4	
Green	Michael Welton*	1,896	58.8	
Conservative	Richard Bliss	704	21.8	
Conservative	Patrick Myers**	697	21.6	
Conservative	Kamy Achanta	664	20.6	
Labour	Charlie Mayer	410	12.7	
Labour	Ben Slater	364	11.3	
Labour	William Weston	321	10.0	
Liberal Democrats	Laura Brophy	155	4.8	
Liberal Democrats	Simon Hepburn	103	3.2	
Liberal Democrats	Margaret Kinsella	103	3.2	
Majority				
Rejected ballots		30	0.1	
Turnout		3,222	41.8	
Registered electors		7,709		

=== Ashton upon Mersey ===
Ashton upon Mersey (3)
Party	Candidate	Votes	%	±%
Labour	Shona Gilbert*	1,901	54.3	
Labour	Ben Hartley*	1,865	53.3	
Labour	Tony O'Brien*	1,710	48.9	
Conservative	Kay Dwyer	1,148	32.8	
Conservative	John Lamb	1,130	32.3	
Conservative	Amit Narang	959	27.4	
Green	Caroline Robertson-Brown	412	11.8	
Green	Nick Robertson-Brown	248	7.1	
Green	Richard Tyldesley	198	5.7	
Liberal Democrats	Kenneth Clarke	171	4.9	
Liberal Democrats	George Devine	171	4.9	
Liberal Democrats	David Kierman	119	3.4	
Majority				
Rejected ballots		9	0.3	
Turnout		3,499	46.4	
Registered electors		7,536		

=== Bowdon ===
Bowdon (3)
Party	Candidate	Votes	%	±%
Conservative	Phil Eckersley	1,806	46.9	
Conservative	Shengke Zhi*	1,756	45.6	
Conservative	Michael Whetton*	1,741	45.2	
Green	Bridget Green	1,584	41.1	
Green	Kate Gilmartin	1,580	41.0	
Green	Gareth Twose	1,431	37.2	
Labour	Thomas Hague	350	9.1	
Labour	Kate Lamerton	347	9.0	
Labour	Josh Spindler	261	6.8	
Liberal Democrats	Harvey Davies	137	3.6	
Liberal Democrats	Mario Miniaci	110	2.9	
Liberal Democrats	Matthew Sellars	95	2.5	
Majority				
Rejected ballots		18	0.5	
Turnout		3,851	45.9	
Registered electors		8,396		

=== Broadheath ===
Broadheath (3)
Party	Candidate	Votes	%	±%
Labour	Denise Western*	1,695	43.2	
Labour	Amy Whyte*	1,674	42.7	
Conservative	Kaushik Chakraborty	1,585	40.4	
Labour	Ulrich Savary	1,566	39.9	
Conservative	Prakash Nathani	1,294	33.0	
Conservative	Russell Scharosch	1,207	30.8	
Green	Francesca Chandler	375	9.6	
Green	Marian Dodds	272	6.9	
Liberal Democrats	Christopher Marritt	268	6.8	
Green	Alexander Young	268	6.8	
Liberal Democrats	Louise Bird	252	6.4	
Independent	John Farndon	192	4.9	
Liberal Democrats	James Miller	162	4.1	
Britain First	Donald Southworth	153	3.9	
Majority				
Rejected ballots		33	0.8	
Turnout		3,921	44.7	
Registered electors		8,771		

=== Brooklands ===
Brooklands (3)
Party	Candidate	Votes	%	±%
Labour	Will Jones*	1,852	47.1	
Labour	Rose Thompson*	1,850	47.1	
Labour	Bilal Babar	1,749	44.5	
Conservative	Chris Boyes*	1,494	38.0	
Conservative	Dan Barker	1,459	37.1	
Conservative	Adrian Hart	1,370	34.9	
Green	Renate Aspden	393	10.0	
Green	Deborah Leftwich	382	9.7	
Green	Robert Cutforth	315	8.0	
Liberal Democrats	Pauline Cliff	301	7.7	
Majority				
Rejected ballots		15	0.4	
Turnout		3,930	51.2	
Registered electors		7,678		

=== Bucklow St Martins ===
Bucklow-St. Martins (3)
Party	Candidate	Votes	%	±%
Labour	Adele New*	1,163	65.4	
Labour	Aidan Williams*	916	51.5	
Labour	James Wright*	872	49.0	
Conservative	Eleanor Johnson	336	18.9	
Conservative	John Reilly	315	17.8	
Conservative	June Reilly	308	17.3	
Green	Wendy Olsen	178	10.0	
Green	Rodrigo Capucho Paulo	158	8.9	
Green	Matthew Westbrook	158	8.9	
Liberal Democrats	Simon Wright	99	5.6	
Majority				
Rejected ballots		45	2.5	
Turnout		1,778	24.5	

=== Davyhulme ===
Davyhulme (3)
Party	Candidate	Votes	%	±%
Labour	Sue Maitland*	1,877	55.9	
Labour	Karina Carter*	1,874	55.8	
Labour	Barry Winstanley*	1,735	51.7	
Conservative	Jonathan Coupe	1,007	30.0	
Conservative	Tracey Haworth	868	25.9	
Conservative	Alan Mitchell	788	23.5	
Green	Bill Bartley	382	11.4	
Green	Kevin Chatterton	216	6.4	
Green	Joe Westbrook	212	6.3	
Liberal Democrats	Ged Zuk	155	4.6	
Reform	Paul Swansborough	137	4.1	
Majority				
Rejected ballots		20	0.6	
Turnout		3,357	38.1	
Registered electors		8,813		

=== Flixton ===
Flixton (3)
Party	Candidate	Votes	%	±%
Labour	Ged Carter*	1,927	58.8	
Labour	Dolores O'Sullivan*	1,750	53.4	
Labour	Simon Thomas*	1,703	51.9	
Conservative	Paul Lally	858	26.2	
Conservative	Michelle McGrath	697	21.3	
Conservative	Susan Taylor	688	21.0	
Green	Katrin Cotter	412	12.7	
Green	Timothy Woodward	345	10.5	
Green	Alison Cavanagh	298	9.1	
Liberal Democrats	Timothy Kinsella	187	5.7	
Majority				
Rejected ballots		40	1.2	
Turnout		3,280	38.4	
Registered electors		8,532		

=== Gorse Hill & Cornbrook ===
Gorse Hill & Cornbrook (3)
Party	Candidate	Votes	%	±%
Labour	David Acton*	1,582	70.4	
Labour	Fianna Hornby*	1,506	70.0	
Labour	Laurence Walsh*	1,430	63.6	
Green	Laura Clitheroe	288	12.8	
Green	Jennie Wadsworth	248	11.0	
Conservative	Stanley John	253	11.3	
Conservative	Eric May	232	10.3	
Conservative	Shaji Sabastian	184	8.2	
Green	Daniel Wadsworth	169	7.5	
Independent	Hazel Gibb	151	6.7	
Liberal Democrats	John Reyes	98	4.4	
Liberal Democrats	Andrew McGuiness	79	3.5	
Majority				
Rejected ballots		15	0.7	
Turnout		2,248	27.2	
Registered electors		8,266		

=== Hale ===
Hale (3)
Party	Candidate	Votes	%	±%
Green	Jane Leicester*	1,798	51.1	
Green	Hannah Spencer	1,521	43.2	
Green	Owain Sutton	1,458	41.4	
Conservative	Daniel Chalkin*	1,329	37.8	
Conservative	Sue Carroll	1,309	37.2	
Conservative	Anand Chinthala	1,188	33.8	
Labour	Michael Jarkowski	366	10.4	
Labour	Chris Millson	349	9.9	
Labour	Mark Nesbitt	312	8.9	
Liberal Democrats	Maggie Boysen	207	5.9	
Liberal Democrats	Donald McIntosh	146	4.2	
Liberal Democrats	Richard Pollard	124	3.5	
Majority				
Rejected ballots		54	1.5	
Turnout		3,518	45.6	
Registered electors		7,707		

=== Hale Barns & Timperley South ===
Hale Barns & Timperley South (3)
Party	Candidate	Votes	%	±%
Conservative	Dylan Butt*	1,511	49.7	
Conservative	Nathan Evans	1,470	48.4	
Conservative	Michael Taylor	1,359	44.8	
Liberal Democrats	Anna Fryer	942	31.0	
Liberal Democrats	Marc Ramsbottom	866	28.5	
Liberal Democrats	Ludo Tolhurst-Cleaver	794	26.1	
Labour	Barbara Twiney	418	13.8	
Labour	Anne-Marie Holmes	412	13.6	
Labour	Jim Larkin	362	11.9	
Green	David Schorah	210	6.9	
Green	Stephen Brunt	175	5.8	
Green	John Ross	142	4.7	
Majority				
Rejected ballots		27	0.9	
Turnout		3,039	40.4	
Registered electors		7,521		

=== Longford ===
Longford (3)
Party	Candidate	Votes	%	±%
Labour	Sarah Haughey*	1,971	70.3	
Labour	Judith Lloyd*	1,768	63.1	
Labour	David Jarman*	1,734	61.9	
Green	Margaret Westbrook	488	17.4	
Green	Matthew Kaufman	337	12.0	
Green	Sanjal Patel	322	11.5	
Conservative	David Booth	317	11.3	
Conservative	Sandhya Paul	258	9.2	
Conservative	Limna Lijo	252	9.0	
Liberal Democrats	Dawn Carberry-Power	169	6.0	
Majority				
Rejected ballots		45	1.6	
Turnout		2,802	36.1	
Registered electors		7,755		

=== Lostock & Barton ===
Lostock & Barton (3)
Party	Candidate	Votes	%	±%
Labour	Jill Axford*	1,569	59.6	
Labour	Mike Cordingley	1,524	57.9	
Labour	Shirley Proctor*	1,430	54.3	
Conservative	Stuart Donnelly	569	21.6	
Conservative	Shony Thomas	500	19.0	
Conservative	Anjumol Stany	461	17.5	
Green	Steve Bowater	305	11.6	
Green	Robert French	203	7.7	
Green	Martin Skelton	188	7.1	
Reform	Steve Dillon	144	5.5	
Liberal Democrats	James Marshall	140	5.3	
Majority				
Rejected ballots		15	0.6	
Turnout		2,632	32.5	
Registered electors		8,094		

=== Manor ===
Manor (3)
Party	Candidate	Votes	%	±%
Conservative	Rob Duncan*	1,507	47.6	
Conservative	John Holden*	1,450	45.8	
Conservative	Rupali Paul	1,294	40.9	
Labour	Frances Cosby	1,195	37.8	
Labour	Sally Hirst	1,141	36.1	
Labour	Steve Little	1,107	35.0	
Green	James McGlashan	254	8.0	
Green	Joy Baggaley	229	7.2	
Green	Diane Plunkett	191	6.0	
Liberal Democrats	Kirsty Cullen	170	5.4	
Liberal Democrats	Gwenda Nolte	144	4.6	
Liberal Democrats	John Peaker	114	3.6	
Women's Equality	Sharon Richards	107	3.4	
Majority				
Rejected ballots		122	3.9	
Turnout		3,164	37.8	
Registered electors		8,370		

=== Old Trafford ===
Old Trafford (3)
Party	Candidate	Votes	%	±%
Labour	Waseem Hassan*	2,235	75.6	
Labour	Emma Hirst	2,118	71.7	
Labour	Sophie Taylor*	1,973	66.8	
Green	Jess Mayo	413	14.0	
Green	Anja Moncrieff	405	13.7	
Green	Rob Raikes	270	9.1	
Conservative	Diane Coupe	141	4.8	
Conservative	Anne Hooley	115	4.0	
Liberal Democrats	Andrew Hick	94	3.2	
Conservative	Chacko Luke	90	3.0	
Majority				
Rejected ballots		29	1.0	
Turnout		2,955	35.4	
Registered electors		8,341		

=== Sale Central ===
Sale Central (3)
Party	Candidate	Votes	%	±%
Labour	Barry Brotherton*	1,974	62.6	
Labour	Eve Parker	1,812	57.5	
Labour	Zak Deakin	1,656	52.6	
Conservative	Mark Bancks	674	21.4	
Conservative	Gareth Parker	624	19.8	
Conservative	Ash Nichanametla	598	19.0	
Green	Dave Turner	454	14.4	
Green	Jem Green	438	13.9	
Green	Tom Stewart	302	9.9	
Liberal Democrats	Joe Kramer	283	9.0	
Majority				
Rejected ballots		48	1.5	
Turnout		3,151	42.1	
Registered electors		7,491		

=== Sale Moor ===
Sale Moor (3)
Party	Candidate	Votes	%	±%
Labour	Joanne Bennett*	1,737	56.7	
Labour	Liz Patel*	1,682	54.9	
Labour	Olly Baskerville	1,662	54.2	
Conservative	Daniel Bell	726	23.7	
Conservative	Christopher Halliday	689	22.5	
Conservative	John Morten	596	19.4	
Green	Chris Hargreaves	386	12.6	
Green	Samuel Hession	285	9.3	
Green	Steve Leicester	246	8.0	
Liberal Democrats	Mark Campion	242	7.9	
Majority				
Rejected ballots		33	1.1	
Turnout		3,066	37.6	
Registered electors		8,165		

=== Stretford & Humphrey Park ===
Stretford & Humphrey Park (3)
Party	Candidate	Votes	%	±%
Labour	Stephen Adshead*	1,962	63.7	
Labour	Jane Slater*	1,880	61.1	
Labour	Tom Ross*	1,851	60.1	
Conservative	Colin Hooley	512	16.6	
Conservative	Stany Emmanuel	482	15.7	
Green	Liz O'Neill	464	15.1	
Conservative	Jerkin Thomas	437	14.2	
Green	Hayley James	330	10.7	
Green	Joe Ryan	287	9.3	
Liberal Democrats	Stephen Power	166	5.4	
Majority				
Rejected ballots		48	1.6	
Turnout		3,078	35.7	
Registered electors		8,623		

=== Timperley Central ===
Timperley Central (3)
Party	Candidate	Votes	%	±%
Liberal Democrats	Shaun Ennis*	1,976	54.0	
Liberal Democrats	Julian Newgrosh*	1,887	51.6	
Liberal Democrats	Simon Lepori	1,874	51.2	
Conservative	Lisa Hancock	923	25.2	
Conservative	Natalie Alexander	899	24.6	
Conservative	Rupert Kelly	868	23.7	
Labour	Malcolm Clarke	499	13.7	
Labour	Kantappa Gajanan	464	12.7	
Labour	Marc Renshaw	461	12.6	
Green	Claire Byron	247	6.8	
Green	Michael Byron	179	5.0	
Green	Killian O'Brien	155	4.2	
Majority				
Rejected ballots		15	0.4	
Turnout		3,658	43.5	
Registered electors		8,409		

=== Timperley North ===
Timperley North (3)
Party	Candidate	Votes	%	±%
Liberal Democrats	Jane Brophy*	2,437	60.2	
Liberal Democrats	Will Frass*	2,211	54.6	
Liberal Democrats	Meena Minnis*	2,189	54.1	
Conservative	John Brodie	843	20.8	
Conservative	Constantine Biller	799	19.7	
Conservative	Bheem Pulla	690	17.0	
Labour	Rachel Fell	650	16.1	
Labour	Peter Heatley	565	14.0	
Labour	Adam Legg	510	12.6	
Green	Rose De La Font	291	7.2	
Green	Julia Harrison	221	5.7	
Green	Aagash Vadera	202	5.0	
Independent	Hugh Cooper	58	1.4	
Majority				
Rejected ballots		48	1.2	
Turnout		4,047	46.8	
Registered electors		8,646		

=== Urmston ===
Urmston (3)
Party	Candidate	Votes	%	±%
Labour	Joanne Harding*	2,044	62.9	
Labour	Catherine Hynes*	1,889	57.2	
Labour	Kevin Procter*	1,743	52.8	
Conservative	Christine Mitchell	770	23.3	
Conservative	Lijo John	685	20.8	
Conservative	Julius Sulle	628	19.0	
Green	Kate Westbrook	478	14.5	
Green	Steven Tennant-Smythe	301	9.1	
Green	Luciya Whyte	298	9.0	
Liberal Democrats	John Franklin-Johnston	227	6.9	
Majority				
Rejected ballots		39	1.2	
Turnout		3,300	38.8	
Registered electors		8,507		

== By-elections ==
=== Bucklow-St. Martin's ===
A by-election was held on 2 November 2023 following the resignation of Adele New.

Changes below are with the 2023 elections.

Bucklow-St. Martin's by-election: 2 November 2023
Party	Candidate	Votes	%	±%
Labour	Frances Cosby	794	62.2	–3.3
Conservative	Paul Lally	284	22.3	+3.4
Reform	Paul Swansborough	82	6.4	N/A
Green	Rodrigo Capucho Paulo	80	6.3	–3.7
Liberal Democrats	Matthew Sellars	36	2.8	–2.8
Majority		510	39.9	
Turnout		1,280	17.5	
Registered electors		7,325		
Labour hold		Swing	▼3.4	
