= Lostock and Barton =

Davyhulme
- Metropolitan borough: Trafford
- Metropolitan county: Greater Manchester
- Country: England
- Sovereign state: United Kingdom
- UK Parliament: Stretford and Urmston
- Councillors: Jill Axford (Labour); Mike Cordingley (Labour); Shirley Procter (Labour)

Lostock and Barton is an electoral ward of on Trafford Council, Trafford, Greater Manchester, covering parts of western Stretford and eastern Davyhulme. Created in 2023 following changes to the boundaries of the electoral wards, the ward incorporates the former Davyhulme East, Gorse Hill wards.

== Councillors ==
The councillors are Jill Axford (Labour), Mike Cordingley (Labour), and Shirley Procter (Labour).

Election	Councillor	Councillor	Councillor
2023	Jill Axford (Lab)	Mike Cordingley (Lab)	Shirley Procter (Lab)
2024	Jill Axford (Lab)	Mike Cordingley (Lab)	Shirley Procter (Lab)

indicates seat up for re-election.

== Elections in the 2020s ==
=== May 2026 ===
2026
Party	Candidate	Votes	%	±%
Labour	Mark Tobin	1,068	30.9	−29.2
Reform	Ian Edwards	1,037	30.0	N/A
Green	Stephen Holman	700	20.2	+7.6
Conservative	Tracey Haworth	468	13.5	−7.7
Liberal Democrats	David Kierman	178	5.1	+0.3
Majority		31	0.9	−38.0
Rejected ballots		9	0.3	-1.0
Turnout		3,460	42.2	+8.6
Registered electors		8,205		
Labour hold		Swing	-29.6	

=== May 2024 ===
2024
Party	Candidate	Votes	%	±%
Labour	Shirley Procter*	1,637	60.1	+0.5
Conservative	Anne Hooley	578	21.2	−0.4
Green	Steve Bowater	342	12.6	+1.0
Liberal Democrats	Simon Wright	130	4.8	−0.5
Majority		1,059	38.9	+6.2
Rejected ballots		35	1.3	+0.7
Turnout		2,723	33.6	+1.1
Registered electors		8,104		
Labour hold		Swing	+0.5	

=== May 2023 ===
2023 (3)
Party	Candidate	Votes	%	±%
Labour	Jill Axford*	1,569	59.6%	
Labour	Mike Cordingley	1,524	57.9%	
Labour	Shirley Proctor*	1,430	54.3%	
Conservative	Stuart Donnelly	569	21.6%	
Conservative	Shony Thomas	500	19.0%	
Conservative	Anjumol Stany	461	17.5%	
Green	Steve Bowater	305	11.6%	
Green	Robert French	203	7.7%	
Green	Martin Skelton	188	7.1%	
Reform	Steve Dillon	144	5.5%	
Liberal Democrats	James Marshall	140	5.3%	
Majority				
Rejected ballots		15	0.6%	
Turnout		2,632	32.5%	
Registered electors		8,094		
