= Stretford and Humphrey Park =

Electoral ward of Trafford, Greater Manchester, England

- Metropolitan borough: Trafford
- Metropolitan county: Greater Manchester
- Country: England
- Sovereign state: United Kingdom
- UK Parliament: Stretford and Urmston
- Councillors: Steve Adshead (Labour); Jane Slater (Labour); Tom Ross (Labour)

Stretford and Humphrey Park is an electoral ward of on Trafford Council, Trafford, Greater Manchester, covering Stretford town centre. Created in 2023 following changes to the boundaries of the electoral wards, the ward incorporates the former Stretford ward and the Humphrey Park area from the Urmston ward.

== Councillors ==
The councillors are Steve Adshead (Labour), Jane Slater (Labour), and Tom Ross (Labour).

| Election | Councillor | Councillor | Councillor |
|---|---|---|---|
| 2023 | Steve Adshead (Lab) | Jane Slater (Lab) | Tom Ross (Lab) |
| 2024 | Steve Adshead (Lab) | Jane Slater (Lab) | Tom Ross (Lab) |

indicates seat up for re-election.

== Elections in the 2020s ==
=== May 2026 ===
2026
| Party | Candidate | Votes | % | ±% |
|---|---|---|---|---|
| Labour | Jane Slater* | 1,380 | 32.2 | −26.8 |
| Green | Daniel Bowdler | 1,264 | 29.5 | +11.4 |
| Reform | Jamie Hook | 1,033 | 24.1 | N/A |
| Conservative | Syeda Rizvi | 360 | 8.4 | −8.2 |
| Liberal Democrats | Stephen Power | 161 | 3.8 | −0.8 |
| Independent | Hazel Gibb-Shacklock | 76 | 1.8 | N/A |
| Majority | | 116 | 2.7 | −38.2 |
| Rejected ballots | | 14 | 0.3 | -1.4 |
| Turnout | | 4,288 | 48.1 | +8.9 |
| Registered electors | | 8,910 | | |
| Labour hold | | Swing | -19.1 | |

=== May 2024 ===
2024
| Party | Candidate | Votes | % | ±% |
|---|---|---|---|---|
| Labour | Tom Ross* | 2,032 | 59.0 | −4.7 |
| Green | Liz O'Neill | 623 | 18.1 | +3.0 |
| Conservative | Chris Boyes | 572 | 16.6 | 0.0 |
| Liberal Democrats | Stephen Power | 159 | 4.6 | −0.8 |
| Majority | | 1,409 | 40.9 | −2.6 |
| Rejected ballots | | 57 | 1.7 | +0.1 |
| Turnout | | 3,443 | 39.2 | +3.5 |
| Registered electors | | 8,774 | | |
| Labour hold | | Swing | -3.9 | |

=== May 2023 ===
2023 (3)
| Party | Candidate | Votes | % | ±% |
|---|---|---|---|---|
| Labour | Stephen Adshead* | 1,962 | 63.7% | |
| Labour | Jane Slater* | 1,880 | 61.1% | |
| Labour | Tom Ross* | 1,851 | 60.1% | |
| Conservative | Colin Hooley | 512 | 16.6% | |
| Conservative | Stany Emmanuel | 482 | 15.7% | |
| Green | Liz O'Neill | 464 | 15.1% | |
| Conservative | Jerkin Thomas | 437 | 14.2% | |
| Green | Hayley James | 330 | 10.7% | |
| Green | Joe Ryan | 287 | 9.3% | |
| Liberal Democrats | Stephen Power | 166 | 5.4% | |
| Majority | | | | |
| Rejected ballots | | 48 | 1.6% | |
| Turnout | | 3,078 | 35.7% | |
| Registered electors | | 8,623 | | |
