= Manor (Trafford ward) =

- Metropolitan borough: Trafford
- Metropolitan county: Greater Manchester
- Country: England
- Sovereign state: United Kingdom
- UK Parliament: Altrincham and Sale West
- Councillors: Rob Duncan (Conservative); John Holden (Conservative); Rupali Paul (Conservative)

Manor is an electoral ward of on Trafford Council, Trafford, Greater Manchester, covering western Sale. Created in 2023 following changes to the boundaries of the electoral wards, the ward incorporates the former St Mary's ward.

== Councillors ==
The councillors are Rob Duncan (Conservative), John Holden (Conservative), and Rupali Paul (Conservative).

Election	Councillor	Councillor	Councillor
2023	Rob Duncan (Con)	John Holden (Con)	Rupali Paul (Con)
2024	Rob Duncan (Con)	John Holden (Con)	Keleigh Glenton (Lab)
2026	Rob Duncan (Con)	Rupali Paul (Con)	Keleigh Glenton (Lab)

indicates seat up for re-election.

== Elections in the 2020s ==
=== May 2024 ===
2024
Party	Candidate	Votes	%	±%
Labour	Keleigh Glenton	1,393	40.7	+2.9
Conservative	Rupali Paul*	1,363	39.8	−7.8
Green	James McGlashan	301	8.8	+0.8
Reform	Angela O'Neill	223	6.5	N/A
Liberal Democrats	David Kierman	126	3.7	−1.7
Majority		30	0.9	
Rejected ballots		15	0.4	-3.5
Turnout		3,421	40.4	+2.6
Registered electors		8,458		
Labour gain from Conservative		Swing	+5.4	

=== May 2023 ===
2023 (3)
Party	Candidate	Votes	%	±%
Conservative	Rob Duncan*	1,507	47.6%	
Conservative	John Holden*	1,450	45.8%	
Conservative	Rupali Paul	1,294	40.9%	
Labour	Frances Cosby	1,195	37.8%	
Labour	Sally Hirst	1,141	36.1%	
Labour	Steve Little	1,107	35.0%	
Green	James McGlashan	254	8.0%	
Green	Joy Baggaley	229	7.2%	
Green	Diane Plunkett	191	6.0%	
Liberal Democrats	Kirsty Cullen	170	5.4%	
Liberal Democrats	Gwenda Nolte	144	4.6%	
Liberal Democrats	John Peaker	114	3.6%	
Women's Equality	Sharon Richards	107	3.4%	
Majority				
Rejected ballots		122	3.9%	
Turnout		3,164	37.8%	
Registered electors		8,370		
