= Sale Central =

Elector ward in England

- Metropolitan borough: Trafford
- Metropolitan county: Greater Manchester
- Country: England
- Sovereign state: United Kingdom
- UK Parliament: Wythenshawe and Sale East
- Councillors: Barry Brotherton (Labour); Eve Parker (Labour); Zak Deakin (Labour)

Sale Central is an electoral ward of on Trafford Council, Trafford, Greater Manchester, covering Sale town centre. Created in 2023 following changes to the boundaries of the electoral wards, the ward incorporates the former Priory ward.

== Councillors ==
The councillors are Barry Brotherton (Labour), Eve Parker (Labour), and Zak Deakin (Labour).

Election	Councillor	Councillor	Councillor
2023	Barry Brotherton (Lab)	Eve Parker (Lab)	Zak Deakin (Lab)
2024	Barry Brotherton (Lab)	Eve Parker (Lab)	Zak Deakin (Lab)

indicates seat up for re-election.

== Elections in the 2020s ==
=== May 2026 ===
2026
Party	Candidate	Votes	%	±%
Labour	Eve Parker*	1,405	36.2	−23.7
Green	Teddy Somers	943	24.3	+14.9
Reform	Stephen Ardern	571	14.7	N/A
Conservative	Kameswari Achanta	521	13.4	−7.7
Liberal Democrats	Joe Kramer	279	7.2	−1.4
SDP	Hilary Salt	145	3.7	N/A
Majority		462	11.9	−26.9
Rejected ballots		18	0.5	-0.4
Turnout		3,882	50.1	+5.3
Registered electors		7,746		
Labour hold		Swing	-19.3	

=== May 2024 ===
2024
Party	Candidate	Votes	%	±%
Labour	Zak Deakin*	2,020	59.9	−2.7
Conservative	Mark Bancks	713	21.1	−0.3
Green	David Turner	318	9.4	−5.0
Liberal Democrats	Joe Kramer	291	8.6	−0.4
Majority		1,307	38.8	+7.6
Rejected ballots		30	0.9	-1.6
Turnout		3,372	44.8	+2.7
Registered electors		7,530		
Labour hold		Swing	-1.5	

=== May 2023 ===
2023 (3)
Party	Candidate	Votes	%	±%
Labour	Barry Brotherton*	1,974	62.6%	
Labour	Eve Parker	1,812	57.5%	
Labour	Zak Deakin	1,656	52.6%	
Conservative	Mark Bancks	674	21.4%	
Conservative	Gareth Parker	624	19.8%	
Conservative	Ash Nichanametla	598	19.0%	
Green	Dave Turner	454	14.4%	
Green	Jem Green	438	13.9%	
Green	Tom Stewart	302	9.9%	
Liberal Democrats	Joe Kramer	283	9.0%	
Majority				
Rejected ballots		48	1.5%	
Turnout		3,151	42.1%	
Registered electors		7,491		
