= Timperley North =

- Metropolitan borough: Trafford
- Metropolitan county: Greater Manchester
- Country: England
- Sovereign state: United Kingdom
- UK Parliament: Altrincham and Sale West
- Councillors: Jane Brophy (Lib Dem); Will Frass (Lib Dem); Meena Minnis (Lib Dem)

Timperley North is an electoral ward of Trafford Council, Trafford, Greater Manchester, covering Timperley. Created in 2023 following changes to the boundaries of the electoral wards, the ward incorporates the former Timperley ward and a small part of the former Broadheath ward.

== Councillors ==
The councillors are Jane Brophy (Liberal Democrat), Will Frass (Liberal Democrat), and Meena Minnis (Liberal Democrats).

Election	Councillor	Councillor	Councillor
2023	Jane Brophy (Lib Dem)	Will Frass (Lib Dem)	Meena Minnis (Lib Dem)
2024	Jane Brophy (Lib Dem)	Will Frass (Lib Dem)	Meena Minnis (Lib Dem)
2026	Jane Brophy (Lib Dem)	Will Frass (Lib Dem)	Meena Minnis (Lib Dem)

indicates seat up for re-election.

== Elections in the 2020s ==
=== May 2026 ===
2026
Party	Candidate	Votes	%	±%
Liberal Democrats	Will Frass*	2,276	48.5	−9.5
Reform	Anthony Shaw	830	17.7	N/A
Conservative	Angela Bruer-Morris	646	13.8	−2.1
Green	Aagash Vadera	471	10.0	+3.6
Labour	Jo Sharpe	440	9.4	−9.4
Advance UK	Angela O'Neill	21	0.4	N/A
Majority		1,446	30.8	−8.4
Rejected ballots		10	0.2	-0.8
Turnout		4,694	53.4	+7.0
Registered electors		8,790		
Liberal Democrats hold		Swing	-13.6	

=== May 2024 ===
2024
Party	Candidate	Votes	%	±%
Liberal Democrats	Meena Minnis*	2,329	58.0	−2.2
Labour	Rachel Fell	754	18.8	+2.7
Conservative	Anand Chinthala	638	15.9	−4.9
Green	Aagash Vadera	259	6.4	−0.8
Majority		1,575	39.2	+5.9
Rejected ballots		39	1.0	-0.1
Turnout		4,019	46.4	−0.4
Registered electors		8,658		
Liberal Democrats hold		Swing	-2.5	

=== May 2023 ===
2023 (3)
Party	Candidate	Votes	%	±%
Liberal Democrats	Jane Brophy*	2,437	60.2%	
Liberal Democrats	Will Frass*	2,211	54.6%	
Liberal Democrats	Meena Minnis*	2,189	54.1%	
Conservative	John Brodie	843	20.8%	
Conservative	Constantine Biller	799	19.7%	
Conservative	Bheem Pulla	690	17.0%	
Labour	Rachel Fell	650	16.1%	
Labour	Peter Heatley	565	14.0%	
Labour	Adam Legg	510	12.6%	
Green	Rose De La Font	291	7.2%	
Green	Julia Harrison	221	5.7%	
Green	Aagash Vadera	202	5.0%	
Independent	Hugh Cooper	58	1.4%	
Majority				
Rejected ballots		48	1.2%	
Turnout		4,047	46.8%	
Registered electors		8,646		
