= Trafford Council =

Local authority for Trafford, England

Type
- Type: Metropolitan borough council

History
- Founded: 1 April 1974

Leadership
- Mayor: Simon Thomas, Labour since 27 May 2026
- Leader: Tom Ross, Labour since 17 December 2022
- Chief Executive: Sara Todd since 1 February 2019

Structure
- Seats: 63 councillors
- Graph of the party split among 63 seats.
- Political groups: Administration (35) Labour (35) Other parties (28) Conservative (12) Green (7) Liberal Democrats (7) Reform (1) Independent (1)
- Joint committees: Greater Manchester Combined Authority; Greater Manchester Police, Fire and Crime Panel
- Length of term: 4 years

Elections
- Voting system: First-past-the-post
- Last election: 7 May 2026
- Next election: 6 May 2027

Meeting place
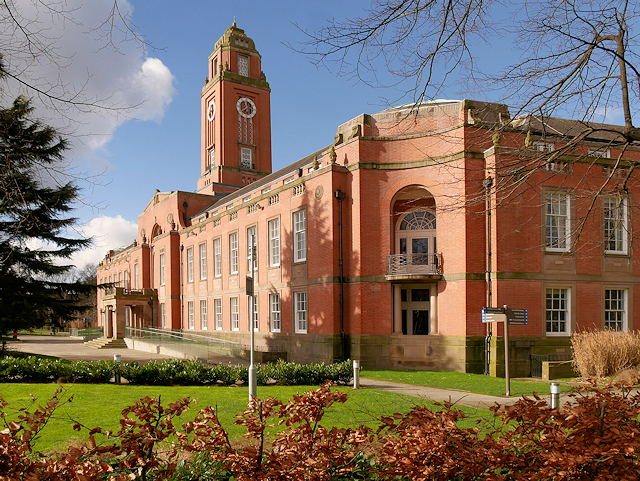
- Trafford Town Hall, Talbot Road, Stretford, Manchester, M32 0TH

Website
- trafford.gov.uk

Trafford Council, or Trafford Metropolitan Borough Council, is the local authority of the Metropolitan Borough of Trafford in Greater Manchester, England. It is a metropolitan borough council and provides the majority of local government services in the borough. The council has been a member of the Greater Manchester Combined Authority since 2011.

The council has been under Labour majority control since 2019. It is based at Trafford Town Hall in Stretford.

== History ==
The Metropolitan Borough of Trafford and its council were created in 1974 under the Local Government Act 1972 as one of ten metropolitan districts within the new metropolitan county of Greater Manchester. The first election was held in 1973. For its first year the council acted as a shadow authority alongside the area's seven outgoing authorities, being the borough councils of Altrincham, Sale and Stretford, the urban district councils of Bowdon, Hale, and Urmston, and the Bucklow Rural District Council (in respect of four of its parishes only). The new metropolitan district and its council formally came into being on 1 April 1974, at which point the old districts and their councils were abolished.

The metropolitan district was awarded borough status from its creation, allowing the chair of the council to take the title of mayor. The council styles itself Trafford Council rather than its full formal name of Trafford Metropolitan Borough Council.

From 1974 until 1986 the council was a lower-tier authority, with upper-tier functions provided by the Greater Manchester County Council. The county council was abolished in 1986 and its functions passed to Greater Manchester's ten borough councils, including Trafford, with some services provided through joint committees.

Since 2011 the council has been a member of the Greater Manchester Combined Authority, which has been led by the directly elected Mayor of Greater Manchester since 2017. The combined authority provides strategic leadership and co-ordination for certain functions across Greater Manchester, notably regarding transport and town planning, but Trafford Council continues to be responsible for most local government functions.

== Governance ==
Trafford Council provides metropolitan borough services. Some strategic functions in the area are provided by the Greater Manchester Combined Authority; the leader of Trafford Council sits on the combined authority as Trafford's representative. There are four civil parishes in the borough at Carrington, Dunham Massey, Partington and Warburton, which form an additional tier of local government for their areas; the rest of the borough is unparished.

=== Political control ===
The council has been under Labour majority control since 2019.

Political control of the council since the 1974 reforms took effect has been as follows:

Party in control	Years
Conservative	1974–1986
No overall control	1986–1988
Conservative	1988–1995
No overall control	1995–1996
Labour	1996–2003
No overall control	2003–2004
Conservative	2004–2018
No overall control	2018–2019
Labour	2019–present

=== Leadership ===
The role of mayor is largely ceremonial in Trafford. Political leadership is instead provided by the leader of the council. The leaders since 1976 have been:

Councillor	Party	From	To
Raymond Littler	Conservative	1 April 1974	1974
Frank Eadie	Conservative	1974	1975
Mike King	Conservative	1976	1977
Colin Warbrick	Conservative	1976	1977
Mike King	Conservative	1977	1978
Jonathan Taylor	Conservative	1978	1982
Mike King	Conservative	1982	1985
Colin Warbrick	Conservative	1985	May 1986
Barry Brotherton	Labour	May 1986	May 1988
Colin Warbrick	Conservative	May 1988	May 1993
Frank Eadie	Conservative	May 1993	May 1995
Beverley Hughes	Labour	May 1995	May 1997
David Acton	Labour	May 1997	May 2004
Susan Williams	Conservative	May 2004	19 May 2009
Matthew Colledge	Conservative	19 May 2009	13 Mar 2014
Sean Anstee	Conservative	13 Mar 2014	23 May 2018
Andrew Western	Labour	23 May 2018	4 Jan 2023
Tom Ross	Labour	4 Jan 2023	

=== Composition ===
Following the May 2026 election and a subsequent party suspension in June 2026, the composition of the council was as follows:

Party	Seats
Labour	35
Conservative	12
Green	7
Liberal Democrats	7
Reform	1
Independent	1
Total	63

The next election is due in May 2027.

== Elections ==
Since the last boundary changes in 2023, the council has comprised 63 councillors representing 21 wards, with each ward electing three councillors. Elections are held three years out of every four, with a third of the council (one councillor for each ward) elected each time for a four-year term of office.

== Wards and councillors ==
Each ward is represented by three councillors.

Parliamentary constituency	Ward	Councillor	Party	Term of office
Altrincham & Sale; West constituency	Altrincham	Geraldine Coggins	Green	2023–27
Altrincham & Sale; West constituency	Altrincham	Michael Welton	Green	2024–28
Altrincham & Sale; West constituency	Altrincham	Daniel Jerrome	Green	2026–30
Altrincham & Sale; West constituency	Ashton upon Mersey	Shona Gilbert	Labour	2023–27
Altrincham & Sale; West constituency	Ashton upon Mersey	Tony O'Brien	Labour	2024–28
Altrincham & Sale; West constituency	Ashton upon Mersey	Ben Hartley	Labour	2026-30
Altrincham & Sale; West constituency	Bowdon	Phil Eckersley	Conservative	2023–27
Altrincham & Sale; West constituency	Bowdon	Shengke Zhi	Conservative	2026–30
Altrincham & Sale; West constituency	Bowdon	Lisa Hancock	Conservative	2024–28
Altrincham & Sale; West constituency	Broadheath	Kaushik Chakraborty^{[a]}	Conservative	2025–27
Altrincham & Sale; West constituency	Broadheath	Ulrich Savary	Liberal Democrats^{[b]}	2024–28
Altrincham & Sale; West constituency	Broadheath	Prakash Nathani	Conservative	2026–30
Altrincham & Sale; West constituency	Hale Barns & Timperley South	Dylan Butt	Conservative	2023–27
Altrincham & Sale; West constituency	Hale Barns & Timperley South	Michael Taylor	Conservative	2024–28
Altrincham & Sale; West constituency	Hale Barns & Timperley South	Nathan Evans	Conservative	2026-30
Altrincham & Sale; West constituency	Hale	Jane Leicester	Green	2023–27
Altrincham & Sale; West constituency	Hale	Natalie Shalom^{[c]}	Conservative	2025–28
Altrincham & Sale; West constituency	Hale	Rupert Kelly	Conservative	2026-30
Altrincham & Sale; West constituency	Manor	Rob Duncan	Conservative	2023–27
Altrincham & Sale; West constituency	Manor	Keleigh Glenton	Labour	2024–28
Altrincham & Sale; West constituency	Manor	Rupali Paul	Conservative	2026-30
Altrincham & Sale; West constituency	Timperley Central	Shaun Ennis	Liberal Democrats	2023–27
Altrincham & Sale; West constituency	Timperley Central	Simon Lepori	Liberal Democrats	2024–28
Altrincham & Sale; West constituency	Timperley Central	Julian Newgrosh	Liberal Democrats	2026-30
Altrincham & Sale; West constituency	Timperley North	Jane Brophy	Liberal Democrats	2023–27
Altrincham & Sale; West constituency	Timperley North	Meena Minnis	Liberal Democrats	2024–28
Altrincham & Sale; West constituency	Timperley North	Will Frass	Liberal Democrats	2026–30
Stretford & Urmston constituency	Bucklow-St. Martins	Frances Cosby	Labour	2023–27
Stretford & Urmston constituency	Bucklow-St. Martins	James Wright	Labour	2024–28
Stretford & Urmston constituency	Bucklow-St. Martins	Charlotte Waterworth	Reform	2026-30
Stretford & Urmston constituency	Davyhulme	Sue Maitland	Labour	2023–27
Stretford & Urmston constituency	Davyhulme	Barry Winstanley	Labour	2024–28
Stretford & Urmston constituency	Davyhulme	Billy Burke	Reform	2026-30
Stretford & Urmston constituency	Flixton	Ged Carter	Labour	2023–27
Stretford & Urmston constituency	Flixton	Simon Thomas	Labour	2024–28
Stretford & Urmston constituency	Flixton	Dolores O'Sullivan	Labour	2026-30
Stretford & Urmston constituency	Gorse Hill & Cornbrook	David Acton	Labour	2023–27
Stretford & Urmston constituency	Gorse Hill & Cornbrook	George Devlin	Labour	2024–28
Stretford & Urmston constituency	Gorse Hill & Cornbrook	Aaron Fradley	Green	2026-30
Stretford & Urmston constituency	Longford	Sarah Haughey	Labour	2023–27
Stretford & Urmston constituency	Longford	Dave Jarman	Labour	2024–28
Stretford & Urmston constituency	Longford	Gareth Twose	Green	2026-30
Stretford & Urmston constituency	Lostock & Barton	Jill Axford	Labour	2023–27
Stretford & Urmston constituency	Lostock & Barton	Shirley Procter	Labour	2024–28
Stretford & Urmston constituency	Lostock & Barton	Mark Tobin	Labour	2026-30
Stretford & Urmston constituency	Old Trafford	Waseem Hassan	Labour	2023–27
Stretford & Urmston constituency	Old Trafford	Sophie Taylor	Labour	2024–28
Stretford & Urmston constituency	Old Trafford	Jennie Wadsworth	Green	2026-30
Stretford & Urmston constituency	Stretford & Humphrey Park	Stephen Adshead	Labour	2023–27
Stretford & Urmston constituency	Stretford & Humphrey Park	Tom Ross	Labour	2024–28
Stretford & Urmston constituency	Stretford & Humphrey Park	Jane Slater	Labour	2026–30
Stretford & Urmston constituency	Urmston	Joanne Harding	Labour	2023–27
Stretford & Urmston constituency	Urmston	Kevin Procter	Labour	2024–28
Stretford & Urmston constituency	Urmston	Claire Sheridan	Labour	2026-30
Wythenshawe & Sale; East constituency	Brooklands	Will Jones	Labour	2023–27
Wythenshawe & Sale; East constituency	Brooklands	Bilal Babar	Labour	2024–28
Wythenshawe & Sale; East constituency	Brooklands	Rose Thompson	Labour	2026-30
Wythenshawe & Sale; East constituency	Sale Central	Barry Brotherton	Labour	2023–27
Wythenshawe & Sale; East constituency	Sale Central	Zak Deakin	Labour	2024–28
Wythenshawe & Sale; East constituency	Sale Central	Eve Parker	Labour	2026-30
Wythenshawe & Sale; East constituency	Sale Moor	Joanne Bennett	Labour	2023–27
Wythenshawe & Sale; East constituency	Sale Moor	Olly Baskerville	Labour	2024–28
Wythenshawe & Sale; East constituency	Sale Moor	Liz Patel	Labour	2026–30

- ^aElected in a by-election in October 2025 following the death in office of Labour councillor Denise Western.
- ^bElected as Labour, resigned from the Labour party in July 2025 and joined the Lib Dems in September 2025.
- ^cElected in a by-election in November 2025 following the resignation of Green councillor Owain Sutton.

== Premises ==
The council is based at Trafford Town Hall, on Talbot Road in Stretford. The building was originally called Stretford Town Hall, having been completed in 1933 for the former Stretford Borough Council, one of Trafford Council's predecessors. Most of the council's offices are in a modern extension to the rear of the building which opened in 2013, replacing an earlier office extension of 1983 on the same site.
