= Davyhulme (ward) =

- Metropolitan borough: Trafford
- Metropolitan county: Greater Manchester
- Country: England
- Sovereign state: United Kingdom
- UK Parliament: Stretford and Urmston
- Councillors: Sue Maitland (Labour); Karina Carter (Labour); Barry Winstanley (Labour)

Davyhulme is an electoral ward of on Trafford Council, Trafford, Greater Manchester, covering Davyhulme. Created in 2023 following changes to the boundaries of the electoral wards, the ward incorporates the former Davyhulme East, Davyhulme West and Flixton wards.

== Councillors ==
The councillors are Sue Maitland (Labour), Billy Burke (Reform), and Barry Winstanley (Labour).

Election	Councillor	Councillor	Councillor
2023	Sue Maitland (Lab)	Karina Carter (Lab)	Barry Winstalney (Lab)
2024	Sue Maitland (Lab)	Karina Carter (Lab)	Barry Winstalney (Lab)
2026	Sue Maitland (Lab)	Billy Burke (Ref)	Barry Winstalney (Lab)

indicates seat up for re-election.

== Elections in the 2020s ==
=== May 2026 ===
2026
Party	Candidate	Votes	%	±%
Reform	Billy Burke	1,294	30.0	N/A
Labour	Karina Carter*	1,283	29.7	−23.1
Conservative	Jonathan Coupe	811	18.8	−8.5
Green	Kevin Chatterton	665	15.4	+5.4
Liberal Democrats	Briony Stephenson	214	5.0	+0.7
Advance UK	Gary Regan	36	0.8	N/A
Majority		11	0.3	
Rejected ballots		16	0.4	-0.1
Turnout		4,319	48.6	+10.6
Registered electors		8,879		
Reform gain from Labour		Swing	+26.6	

=== May 2024 ===
2024
Party	Candidate	Votes	%	±%
Labour	Barry Winstanley*	1,772	52.8	−3.1
Conservative	Jonathan Coupe	918	27.3	−2.7
Green	Kevin Chatterton	337	10.0	−1.4
Independent	Gary Regan	166	4.9	N/A
Liberal Democrats	Tim Kinsella	146	4.3	−0.3
Majority		854	25.4	+3.7
Rejected ballots		18	0.5	-0.1
Turnout		3,357	38.0	−0.1
Registered electors		8,823		
Labour hold		Swing	-0.2	

=== May 2023 ===
2023 (3)
Party	Candidate	Votes	%	±%
Labour	Sue Maitland*	1,877	55.9%	
Labour	Karina Carter*	1,874	55.8%	
Labour	Barry Winstanley*	1,735	51.7%	
Conservative	Jonathan Coupe	1,007	30.0%	
Conservative	Tracey Haworth	868	25.9%	
Conservative	Alan Mitchell	788	23.5%	
Green	Bill Bartley	382	11.4%	
Green	Kevin Chatterton	216	6.4%	
Green	Joe Westbrook	212	6.3%	
Liberal Democrats	Ged Zuk	155	4.6%	
Reform	Paul Swansborough	137	4.1%	
Majority				
Rejected ballots		20	0.6%	
Turnout		3,357	38.1%	
Registered electors		8,813		
