= 2024 Trafford Metropolitan Borough Council election =

2024 English local election

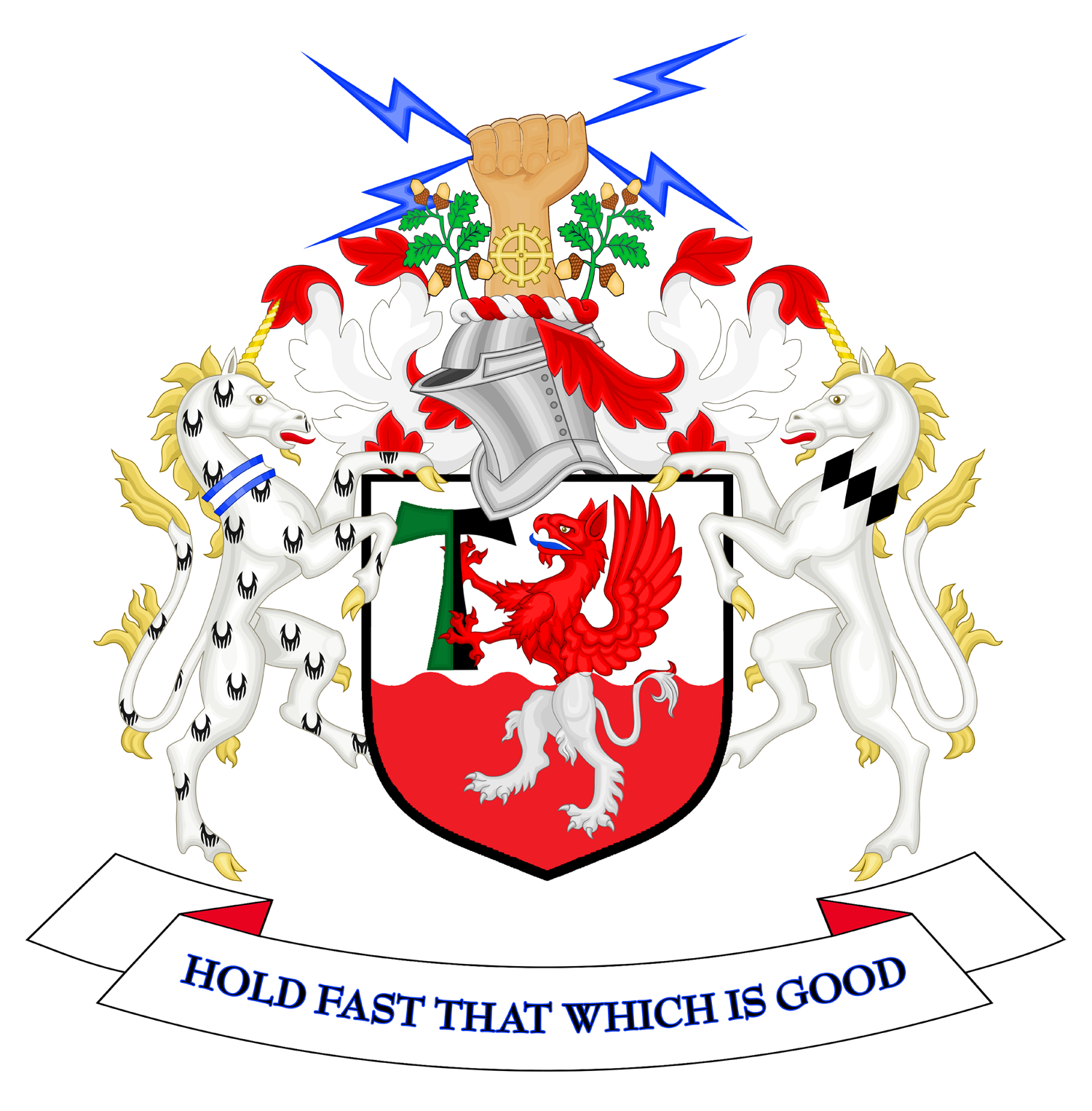
- 2 May 2024

21 of 63 seats to Trafford Metropolitan Borough Council 32 seats needed for a majority
	First party	Second party
Leader	Tom Ross	Nathan Evans
Party	Labour	Conservative
Leader's seat	Stretford & Humphrey Park	Hale Barns & Timperley South
Last election	41 seats, 44.6%	10 seats, 28.4%
Seats before	41	10
Seats won	15	2
Seats after	43	8
Seat change	▲2	▼2
Popular vote	29,338	17,645
Percentage	41.9%	25.2%
Swing	▼2.7%	▼3.2%
	Third party	Fourth party
Leader	Michael Welton	Shaun Ennis
Party	Green	Liberal Democrats
Leader's seat	Altrincham	Timperley Central
Last election	6 seats, 15.8%	6 seats, 10.8%
Seats before	6	6
Seats won	2	2
Seats after	6	6
Seat change	Steady	Steady
Popular vote	12,463	7,983
Percentage	17.8%	11.4%
Swing	▲2.0%	▲0.6%
- Map of results of 2024 election
Leader before election
Tom Ross
Labour
Leader after election
Tom Ross
Labour

The 2024 Trafford Metropolitan Borough Council elections were held on 2 May 2024 alongside other local elections in the United Kingdom and the 2024 Greater Manchester mayoral election. One third of the 63 seats were contested, with each successful candidate elected to serve a four-year term of office expiring in 2028.

Following the election the Labour Party retained control of the authority, increasing their share of the Council's seats; the Party gaining two seats from the Conservative Party in Broadheath ward and Manor ward.

Turnout during the election saw 41% of the electorate using their vote; representing the highest voter turnout of a local authority area in Greater Manchester.

== Background ==
The Local Government Act 1972 created a two-tier system of metropolitan counties and districts covering Greater Manchester, Merseyside, South Yorkshire, Tyne and Wear, the West Midlands, and West Yorkshire starting in 1974. Trafford was a district of the Greater Manchester metropolitan county. The Local Government Act 1985 abolished the metropolitan counties, with metropolitan districts taking on most of their powers as metropolitan boroughs. The Greater Manchester Combined Authority was created in 2011 and began electing the mayor of Greater Manchester from 2017, which was given strategic powers covering a region coterminous with the former Greater Manchester metropolitan county.

In June 2022, the Local Government Boundary Commission for England made The Trafford (Electoral Changes) Order 2022, which officially abolished all 21 existing wards and established 21 new wards with new boundaries. All 63 Council seats were contested at the 2023 elections. The elected councillor who received the least number of votes in each ward at the 2023 election had their seat contested in this election.

== Electoral process ==
The council elects its councillors in thirds, with a third being up for election every year for three years, with no election in the fourth year. The election will take place by first-past-the-post voting, with wards being represented by three councillors, with one elected in each election year to serve a four-year term.

All registered electors (British, Irish, Commonwealth and European Union citizens) living in Trafford aged 18 or over were entitled to vote in the election. People who lived at two addresses in different local authorities, such as university students with different term-time and holiday addresses, were entitled to be registered for elections in both local authorities. Voting in-person at polling stations took place from 07:00 to 22:00 on election day, with voters able to apply for postal votes or proxy votes in advance of the election.

== Election result ==
Party	Votes		Seats			Full Council	
Labour Party	29,338 (41.9%)	▼2.7	15 (71.4%)	15 / 21	▲2	43 (68.3%)	43 / 63
Conservative Party	17,645 (25.2%)	▼3.2	2 (9.5%)	2 / 21	▼2	8 (12.7%)	8 / 63
Green Party	12,463 (17.8%)	▲2.0	2 (9.5%)	2 / 21	Steady	6 (9.5%)	6 / 63
Liberal Democrats	7,983 (11.4%)	▲0.6	2 (9.5%)	2 / 21	Steady	6 (9.5%)	6 / 63
Reform UK	1,595 (2.3%)	▲2.0	0 (0.0%)	0 / 21	Steady	0 (0.0%)	0 / 63
Independent	842 (1.2%)	▲0.8	0 (0.0%)	0 / 21	Steady	0 (0.0%)	0 / 63
TUSC	88 (0.1%)	N/A	0 (0.0%)	0 / 21	Steady	0 (0.0%)	0 / 63

↓
43	8	6	6

== Ward results ==
=== Altrincham ===
Altrincham
Party	Candidate	Votes	%	±%
Green	Michael Welton*	1,927	57.0	−4.5
Conservative	Julie Ashall	810	23.9	+2.1
Labour	Will Franks	518	15.3	+2.6
Liberal Democrats	Mario Miniaci	103	3.0	−1.8
Majority		1,117	33.0	−4.0
Rejected ballots		25	0.7	-0.2
Turnout		3,383	43.0	+1.2
Registered electors		7,876		
Green hold		Swing	-3.3	

=== Ashton upon Mersey ===
Ashton upon Mersey
Party	Candidate	Votes	%	±%
Labour	Tony O’Brien*	1,891	54.1	−0.2
Conservative	Amit Narang	927	26.5	−6.3
Green	Jessica Plunkett	449	12.9	+1.1
Liberal Democrats	Barney Rule	183	5.2	+0.3
Majority		964	27.6	+11.5
Rejected ballots		44	1.3	+1.0
Turnout		3,494	45.8	−0.6
Registered electors		7,631		
Labour hold		Swing	+3.1	

=== Bowdon ===
Bowdon
Party	Candidate	Votes	%	±%
Conservative	Lisa Hancock	1,719	42.9	−4.0
Green	Bridget Green	1,698	42.4	+1.3
Labour	Kate Lamerton	322	8.0	−1.1
Reform	Paul Swansborough	174	4.3	N/A
Liberal Democrats	Ludo Tolhust-Cleaver	82	2.0	−1.6
Majority		21	0.5	−3.6
Rejected ballots		11	0.3	-0.2
Turnout		4,006	47.9	+2.0
Registered electors		8,361		
Conservative hold		Swing	-2.7	

=== Broadheath ===
Broadheath
Party	Candidate	Votes	%	±%
Labour	Ulrich Savary	1,716	41.1	−2.1
Conservative	Kaushik Chakraborty*	1,710	41.0	+0.6
Green	Alexander Young	271	6.5	−3.1
Reform	Andrew Brougham-Holland	219	5.3	N/A
Liberal Democrats	Christopher Marritt	179	4.3	−2.5
Independent	Stephen Farndon	56	1.3	−3.6
Majority		6	0.1	
Rejected ballots		17	0.4	-0.4
Turnout		4,168	47.4	+2.7
Registered electors		8,787		
Labour gain from Conservative		Swing	-1.4	

=== Brooklands ===
Brooklands
Party	Candidate	Votes	%	±%
Labour	Bilal Babar*	1,819	47.3	+0.2
Conservative	Christopher Halliday	1,184	30.8	−7.2
Green	Renate Aspden	354	9.2	−0.8
Reform	Dan Barker	255	6.6	N/A
Liberal Democrats	Pauline Cliff	218	5.7	−2.0
Majority		635	16.5	+10.0
Rejected ballots		18	0.5	+0.1
Turnout		3,848	49.7	−1.5
Registered electors		7,738		
Labour hold		Swing	+3.7	

=== Bucklow-St. Martin's ===
Bucklow-St. Martin's
Party	Candidate	Votes	%	±%
Labour	James Wright*	1,114	61.5	−5.3
Conservative	Limna Lijo	375	20.7	+1.3
Green	Daniel Wadsworth	129	7.1	−3.0
Liberal Democrats	Matthew Sellars	122	6.6	+1.0
Green	Rodrigo Capucho Paulo	72	3.9	−6.1
Majority		739	39.8	+9.7
Rejected ballots		43	2.3	-0.2
Turnout		1,855	24.8	+0.3
Registered electors		7,484		
Labour hold		Swing	-3.3	

=== Davyhulme ===
Davyhulme
Party	Candidate	Votes	%	±%
Labour	Barry Winstanley*	1,772	52.8	−3.1
Conservative	Jonathan Coupe	918	27.3	−2.7
Green	Kevin Chatterton	337	10.0	−1.4
Independent	Gary Regan	166	4.9	N/A
Liberal Democrats	Tim Kinsella	146	4.3	−0.3
Majority		854	25.4	+3.7
Rejected ballots		18	0.5	-0.1
Turnout		3,357	38.0	−0.1
Registered electors		8,823		
Labour hold		Swing	-0.2	

=== Flixton ===
Flixton
Party	Candidate	Votes	%	±%
Labour	Simon Thomas*	1,936	56.3	−2.5
Conservative	John Lijo	718	20.9	−5.3
Green	Katrin Cotter	425	12.4	−0.3
Independent	Paul Regan	200	5.8	N/A
Liberal Democrats	Kirsty Cullen	132	3.8	−1.9
Majority		1,218	35.4	+9.7
Rejected ballots		30	0.9	-0.3
Turnout		3,441	40.2	+1.8
Registered electors		8,564		
Labour hold		Swing	+1.4	

=== Gorse Hill & Cornbrook ===
Gorse Hill & Cornbrook
Party	Candidate	Votes	%	±%
Labour	George Devlin	1,562	60.2	−10.2
Green	Laura Clitheroe	419	16.2	+3.4
Conservative	Stuart Donnelly	302	11.6	+0.3
Independent	Hazel Gibb	184	7.1	+0.4
Liberal Democrats	Dawn Carberry-Power	96	3.7	−0.7
Majority		1,143	44.0	−6.8
Rejected ballots		31	1.2	+0.5
Turnout		2,594	30.4	+3.2
Registered electors		8,531		
Labour hold		Swing	-6.8	

=== Hale ===
Hale
Party	Candidate	Votes	%	±%
Green	Owain Sutton*	1,751	47.3	−2.8
Conservative	Natalie Shalom	1,351	36.5	−1.3
Labour	Josh Spindler	436	11.8	+1.4
Liberal Democrats	Jason Stack	135	3.6	−2.3
Majority		400	10.8	+7.2
Rejected ballots		27	0.7	-0.8
Turnout		3,700	47.4	+1.8
Registered electors		7,814		
Green hold		Swing	-0.8	

=== Hale Barns & Timperley South ===
Hale Barns & Timperley South
Party	Candidate	Votes	%	±%
Conservative	Michael Taylor*	1,385	43.0	−1.7
Liberal Democrats	Marc Ramsbottom	1,076	33.4	+2.4
Labour	Gawain Glenton	336	10.4	−3.4
Green	John Ross	223	6.9	0.0
Reform	Andrew Davies	201	6.2	N/A
Majority		309	9.6	−4.2
Rejected ballots		16	0.5	-0.4
Turnout		3,237	43.0	+2.6
Registered electors		7,521		
Conservative hold		Swing	-4.5	

=== Longford ===
Longford
Party	Candidate	Votes	%	±%
Labour	David Jarman*	1,678	57.1	−13.2
Green	Margaret Westbrook	645	22.0	+4.6
Conservative	Colin Hooley	288	9.8	−1.5
Liberal Democrats	Anna Fryer	214	7.3	+1.3
TUSC	Samuel Hogan-Webb	88	3.0	N/A
Majority		1,033	35.1	−9.4
Rejected ballots		25	0.9	-0.7
Turnout		2,938	37.0	+0.9
Registered electors		7,941		
Labour hold		Swing	-8.9	

=== Lostock & Barton ===
Lostock & Barton
Party	Candidate	Votes	%	±%
Labour	Shirley Procter*	1,637	60.1	+0.5
Conservative	Anne Hooley	578	21.2	−0.4
Green	Steve Bowater	342	12.6	+1.0
Liberal Democrats	Simon Wright	130	4.8	−0.5
Majority		1,059	38.9	+6.2
Rejected ballots		35	1.3	+0.7
Turnout		2,723	33.6	+1.1
Registered electors		8,104		
Labour hold		Swing	+0.5	

=== Manor ===
Manor
Party	Candidate	Votes	%	±%
Labour	Keleigh Glenton	1,393	40.7	+2.9
Conservative	Rupali Paul*	1,363	39.8	−7.8
Green	James McGlashan	301	8.8	+0.8
Reform	Angela O'Neill	223	6.5	N/A
Liberal Democrats	David Kierman	126	3.7	−1.7
Majority		30	0.9	
Rejected ballots		15	0.4	-3.5
Turnout		3,421	40.4	+2.6
Registered electors		8,458		
Labour gain from Conservative		Swing	+5.4	

=== Old Trafford ===
Old Trafford
Party	Candidate	Votes	%	±%
Labour	Sophie Taylor*	1,941	58.9	−16.7
Green	Anja Moncrieff	1,011	30.7	+16.7
Conservative	Diane Coupe	144	4.4	−0.4
Liberal Democrats	Andrew Hick	133	4.0	+0.8
Majority		930	28.2	−24.6
Rejected ballots		65	2.0	+1.0
Turnout		3,294	38.7	+3.3
Registered electors		8,520		
Labour hold		Swing	-16.7	

=== Sale Central ===
Sale Central
Party	Candidate	Votes	%	±%
Labour	Zak Deakin*	2,020	59.9	−2.7
Conservative	Mark Bancks	713	21.1	−0.3
Green	David Turner	318	9.4	−5.0
Liberal Democrats	Joe Kramer	291	8.6	−0.4
Majority		1,307	38.8	+7.6
Rejected ballots		30	0.9	-1.6
Turnout		3,372	44.8	+2.7
Registered electors		7,530		
Labour hold		Swing	-1.5	

=== Sale Moor ===
Sale Moor
Party	Candidate	Votes	%	±%
Labour	Olly Baskerville*	1,863	57.9	+1.2
Conservative	Sue Carroll	728	22.6	−1.1
Green	Chris Hargreaves	394	12.3	−0.3
Liberal Democrats	James Miller	192	6.0	−1.9
Majority		1,135	35.3	+4.8
Rejected ballots		39	1.2	+0.1
Turnout		3,216	39.2	+1.6
Registered electors		8,198		
Labour hold		Swing	+1.2	

=== Stretford & Humphrey Park ===
Stretford & Humphrey Park
Party	Candidate	Votes	%	±%
Labour	Tom Ross*	2,032	59.0	−4.7
Green	Liz O'Neill	623	18.1	+3.0
Conservative	Chris Boyes	572	16.6	0.0
Liberal Democrats	Stephen Power	159	4.6	−0.8
Majority		1,409	40.9	−2.6
Rejected ballots		57	1.7	+0.1
Turnout		3,443	39.2	+3.5
Registered electors		8,774		
Labour hold		Swing	-3.9	

=== Timperley Central ===
Timperley Central
Party	Candidate	Votes	%	±%
Liberal Democrats	Simon Lepori*	1,808	49.7	−4.3
Conservative	Harry Atack	751	20.6	−4.6
Labour	Mark Nesbitt	623	17.1	+3.4
Reform	Deborah Rhodes	245	6.8	N/A
Green	James Brooke-Taylor	189	5.2	−1.6
Majority		1,057	29.1	+3.0
Rejected ballots		24	0.7	+0.3
Turnout		3,641	43.0	−0.5
Registered electors		8,463		
Liberal Democrats hold		Swing	+0.2	

=== Timperley North ===
Timperley North
Party	Candidate	Votes	%	±%
Liberal Democrats	Meena Minnis*	2,329	58.0	−2.2
Labour	Rachel Fell	754	18.8	+2.7
Conservative	Anand Chinthala	638	15.9	−4.9
Green	Aagash Vadera	259	6.4	−0.8
Majority		1,575	39.2	+5.9
Rejected ballots		39	1.0	-0.1
Turnout		4,019	46.4	−0.4
Registered electors		8,658		
Liberal Democrats hold		Swing	-2.5	

=== Urmston ===
Urmston
Party	Candidate	Votes	%	±%
Labour	Kevin Procter*	1,975	57.1	−5.8
Conservative	Ali Aydogdu	471	13.6	−9.7
Green	Steven Tennant	354	10.2	−4.3
Reform	Steve Dillon	278	8.0	N/A
Independent	Andrew Beaumont	236	6.8	N/A
Liberal Democrats	John Franklin-Johnston	135	3.9	−3.0
Majority		1,504	43.5	+14.0
Rejected ballots		21	0.6	-0.6
Turnout		3,461	40.5	+1.7
Registered electors		8,543		
Labour hold		Swing	+2.0	

== By-elections ==
=== Broadheath ===
A by-election was held on 16 October 2025 following the death of Denise Western.

Changes below are with the 2024 elections, not the 2023 election when the incumbent councillor was elected.

Broadheath by-election: 16 October 2025
Party	Candidate	Votes	%	±%
Conservative	Kaushik Chakraborty	1,614	36.8	−4.2
Labour	Mahvish Masood	978	22.3	−18.8
Liberal Democrats	Louise Bird	841	19.2	+14.9
Reform	Deborah Rhodes	723	16.5	+11.2
Green	Alexander Young	204	4.6	+0.3
Independent	Stephen Farndon	22	0.5	−0.8
Majority		636	14.5	
Rejected ballots		7	0.2	-0.2
Turnout		4,389	49.6	
Registered electors		8,846		
Conservative gain from Labour		Swing	▲7.3	

=== Hale ===
A by-election was held on 20 November 2025 following the resignation of Owain Sutton.

Changes below are with the 2024 elections.

Hale by-election: 20 November 2025
Party	Candidate	Votes	%	±%
Conservative	Natalie Shalom	1,521	46.5	+10.0
Green	Orla Weir	1,245	38.1	−9.2
Reform	Phil Holt	264	8.1	N/A
Labour	Clare Sheridan	138	4.2	−7.6
Liberal Democrats	Jason Stack	101	3.1	−0.5
Majority		276	8.4	
Rejected ballots		2	0.1	-0.6
Turnout		3,271	41.7	−5.7
Registered electors		7,849		
Conservative gain from Green		Swing	▲9.6	
