= Timperley Central =

- Metropolitan borough: Trafford
- Metropolitan county: Greater Manchester
- Country: England
- Sovereign state: United Kingdom
- UK Parliament: Altrincham and Sale West
- Councillors: Shaun Ennis (Lib Dem); Julian Newgrosh (Lib Dem); Simon Lepori (Lib Dem)

Timperley Central is an electoral ward of Trafford Council, Trafford, Greater Manchester, covering Timperley. Created in 2023 following changes to the boundaries of the electoral wards, the ward incorporates most of the former Village ward and a smaller part of the former Timperley ward.

== Councillors ==
The councillors are Shaun Ennis (Liberal Democrat), Julian Newgrosh (Liberal Democrat), and Simon Lepori (Liberal Democrats).

Election	Councillor	Councillor	Councillor
2023	Shaun Ennis (Lib Dem)	Julian Newgrosh (Lib Dem)	Simon Lepori (Lib Dem)
2024	Shaun Ennis (Lib Dem)	Julian Newgrosh (Lib Dem)	Simon Lepori (Lib Dem)

indicates seat up for re-election.

== Elections in the 2020s ==
=== May 2026 ===
2026
Party	Candidate	Votes	%	±%
Liberal Democrats	Julian Newgrosh*	1,693	39.0	−10.7
Reform	Philip Holt	1,081	24.9	+18.1
Conservative	Vineeta Chouhan	765	17.6	−3.0
Green	James Brooke-Taylor	475	10.9	+5.4
Labour	Barbara Twiney	325	7.5	−9.6
Majority		612	14.1	−15.0
Rejected ballots		5	0.1	-0.6
Turnout		4,344	50.3	+7.3
Registered electors		8,644		
Liberal Democrats hold		Swing	-14.4	

=== May 2024 ===
2024
Party	Candidate	Votes	%	±%
Liberal Democrats	Simon Lepori*	1,808	49.7	−4.3
Conservative	Harry Atack	751	20.6	−4.6
Labour	Mark Nesbitt	623	17.1	+3.4
Reform	Deborah Rhodes	245	6.8	N/A
Green	James Brooke-Taylor	189	5.2	−1.6
Majority		1,057	29.0	+3.0
Rejected ballots		24	0.7	+0.3
Turnout		3,641	43.0	−0.5
Registered electors		8,463		
Liberal Democrats hold		Swing	+0.2	

=== May 2023 ===
2023 (3)
Party	Candidate	Votes	%	±%
Liberal Democrats	Shaun Ennis*	1,976	54.0%	
Liberal Democrats	Julian Newgrosh*	1,887	51.6%	
Liberal Democrats	Simon Lepori	1,874	51.2%	
Conservative	Lisa Hancock	923	25.2%	
Conservative	Natalie Alexander	899	24.6%	
Conservative	Rupert Kelly	868	23.7%	
Labour	Malcolm Clarke	499	13.7%	
Labour	Kantappa Gajanan	464	12.7%	
Labour	Marc Renshaw	461	12.6%	
Green	Claire Byron	247	6.8%	
Green	Michael Byron	179	5.0%	
Green	Killian O'Brien	155	4.2%	
Majority				
Rejected ballots		15	0.4%	
Turnout		3,658	43.5%	
Registered electors		8,409		
