= Hale Barns and Timperley South =

- Metropolitan borough: Trafford
- Metropolitan county: Greater Manchester
- Country: England
- Sovereign state: United Kingdom
- UK Parliament: Altrincham and Sale West
- Councillors: Dylan Butt (Conservative); Nathan Evans (Conservative); Michael Taylor (Conservative)

Hale Barns and Timperley South is an electoral ward of on Trafford Council, Trafford, Greater Manchester, covering western Hale Barns and a small part of southern Timperley. Created in 2023 following changes to the boundaries of the electoral wards, the ward incorporates the former Hale Barns and Village wards.

== Councillors ==
The councillors are Dylan Butt (Conservative), Nathan Evans (Conservative), and Michael Taylor (Conservative).

Election	Councillor	Councillor	Councillor
2023	Dylan Butt (Con)	Nathan Evans (Con)	Michael Taylor (Con)
2024	Dylan Butt (Con)	Nathan Evans (Con)	Michael Taylor (Con)

indicates seat up for re-election.

== Elections in the 2020s ==
=== May 2026 ===
2026
Party	Candidate	Votes	%	±%
Conservative	Nathan Evans*	2,138	51.6	+8.6
Liberal Democrats	Matt Sellars	1,084	26.2	−7.2
Reform	Leslie Cupitt	431	10.4	+4.2
Green	Centaine Parker	299	7.2	+0.3
Labour	Isaac Jones	183	4.4	−6.0
Majority		1,054	25.4	+15.8
Rejected ballots		8	0.2	-0.3
Turnout		4,144	54.2	+11.2
Registered electors		7,647		
Conservative hold		Swing	+7.9	

=== May 2024 ===
2024
Party	Candidate	Votes	%	±%
Conservative	Michael Taylor*	1,385	43.0	−1.7
Liberal Democrats	Marc Ramsbottom	1,076	33.4	+2.4
Labour	Gawain Glenton	336	10.4	−3.4
Green	John Ross	223	6.9	0.0
Reform	Andrew Davies	201	6.2	N/A
Majority		309	9.6	−4.2
Rejected ballots		16	0.5	-0.4
Turnout		3,237	43.0	+2.6
Registered electors		7,521		
Conservative hold		Swing	-4.5	

=== May 2023 ===
2023 (3)
Party	Candidate	Votes	%	±%
Conservative	Dylan Butt*	1,511	49.7%	
Conservative	Nathan Evans	1,470	48.4%	
Conservative	Michael Taylor	1,359	44.8%	
Liberal Democrats	Anna Fryer	942	31.0%	
Liberal Democrats	Marc Ramsbottom	866	28.5%	
Liberal Democrats	Ludo Tolhurst-Cleaver	794	26.1%	
Labour	Barbara Twiney	418	13.8%	
Labour	Anne-Marie Holmes	412	13.6%	
Labour	Jim Larkin	362	11.9%	
Green	David Schorah	210	6.9%	
Green	Stephen Brunt	175	5.8%	
Green	John Ross	142	4.7%	
Majority				
Rejected ballots		27	0.9%	
Turnout		3,039	40.4%	
Registered electors		7,521		
