= Old Trafford (ward) =

- Metropolitan borough: Trafford
- Metropolitan county: Greater Manchester
- Country: England
- Sovereign state: United Kingdom
- UK Parliament: Stretford and Urmston
- Councillors: Waseem Hassan (Labour); Jennie Wadsworth (Green); Sophie Taylor (Labour)

Old Trafford is an electoral ward on Trafford Council, Trafford, Greater Manchester, covering Old Trafford. Created in 2023 following changes to the boundaries of the electoral wards, the ward incorporates the former Clifford ward.

== Councillors ==
The councillors are Waseem Hassan (Labour), Emma Hirst (Labour), and Sophie Taylor (Labour).

Election	Councillor	Councillor	Councillor
2023	Waseem Hassan (Lab)	Emma Hirst (Lab)	Sophie Taylor (Lab)
2024	Waseem Hassan (Lab)	Emma Hirst (Lab)	Sophie Taylor (Lab)

indicates seat up for re-election.

== Elections in the 2020s ==
=== May 2024 ===
2024
Party	Candidate	Votes	%	±%
Labour	Sophie Taylor*	1,941	58.9	−16.7
Green	Anja Moncrieff	1,011	30.7	+16.7
Conservative	Diane Coupe	144	4.4	−0.4
Liberal Democrats	Andrew Hick	133	4.0	+0.8
Majority		930	28.2	−24.6
Rejected ballots		65	2.0	+1.0
Turnout		3,294	38.7	+3.3
Registered electors		8,520		
Labour hold		Swing	-16.7	

=== May 2023 ===
2023 (3)
Party	Candidate	Votes	%	±%
Labour	Waseem Hassan*	2,235	75.6%	
Labour	Emma Hirst	2,118	71.7%	
Labour	Sophie Taylor*	1,973	66.8%	
Green	Jess Mayo	413	14.0%	
Green	Anja Moncrieff	405	13.7%	
Green	Rob Raikes	270	9.1%	
Conservative	Diane Coupe	141	4.8%	
Conservative	Anne Hooley	115	4.0%	
Liberal Democrats	Andrew Hick	94	3.2%	
Conservative	Chacko Luke	90	3.0%	
Majority				
Rejected ballots		29	1.0%	
Turnout		2,955	35.4%	
Registered electors		8,341		
