= Gorse Hill and Cornbrook =

- Metropolitan borough: Trafford
- Metropolitan county: Greater Manchester
- Country: England
- Sovereign state: United Kingdom
- UK Parliament: Stretford and Urmston
- Councillors: David Acton (Labour); Fianna Hornby (Labour); Laurence Walsh (Labour)

Gorse Hill and Cornbrook is an electoral ward of on Trafford Council, Trafford, Greater Manchester, covering Davyhulme. Created in 2023 following changes to the boundaries of the electoral wards, the ward incorporates the former Gorse Hill, and Longford wards.

== Councillors ==
The councillors are David Acton (Labour), Fianna Hornby (Labour), and Laurence Walsh (Labour).

Election	Councillor	Councillor	Councillor
2023	David Acton (Lab)	Fianna Hornby (Lab)	Laurence Walsh (Lab)
2024	David Acton (Lab)	Fianna Hornby (Lab)	George Devlin (Lab)

indicates seat up for re-election.

== Elections in the 2020s ==
=== May 2024 ===
2024
Party	Candidate	Votes	%	±%
Labour	George Devlin	1,562	60.2	−10.2
Green	Laura Clitheroe	419	16.2	+3.4
Conservative	Stuart Donnelly	302	11.6	+0.3
Independent	Hazel Gibb	184	7.1	+0.4
Liberal Democrats	Dawn Carberry-Power	96	3.7	−0.7
Majority		1,143	44.0	−6.8
Rejected ballots		31	1.2	+0.5
Turnout		2,594	30.4	+3.2
Registered electors		8,531		
Labour hold		Swing	-6.8	

=== May 2023 ===
2023 (3)
Party	Candidate	Votes	%	±%
Labour	David Acton*	1,582	70.4%	
Labour	Fianna Hornby*	1,506	70.0%	
Labour	Laurence Walsh*	1,430	63.6%	
Green	Laura Clitheroe	288	12.8%	
Green	Jennie Wadsworth	248	11.0%	
Conservative	Stanley John	253	11.3%	
Conservative	Eric May	232	10.3%	
Conservative	Shaji Sabastian	184	8.2%	
Green	Daniel Wadsworth	169	7.5%	
Independent	Hazel Gibb	151	6.7%	
Liberal Democrats	John Reyes	98	4.4%	
Liberal Democrats	Andrew McGuiness	79	3.5%	
Majority				
Rejected ballots		15	0.7%	
Turnout		2,248	27.2%	
Registered electors		8,266		
