= Gorse Hill (ward) =

Electoral division of Greater Manchester, England

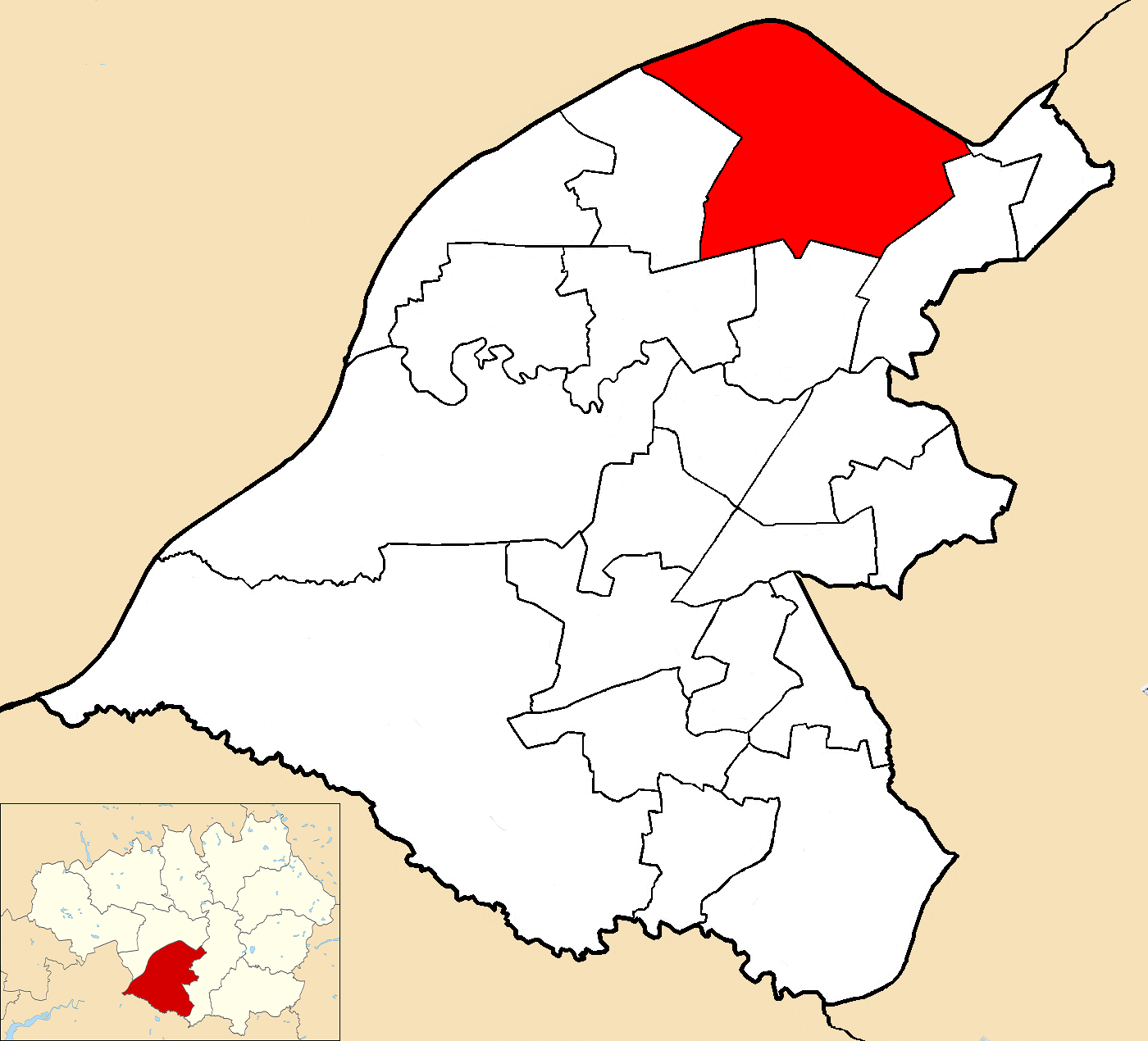
- Gorse Hill within Trafford
- Population: 12,171
- Metropolitan borough: Trafford
- Metropolitan county: Greater Manchester
- Country: England
- Sovereign state: United Kingdom
- UK Parliament: Stretford and Urmston
- Councillors: David Acton (Labour); Fianna Hornby (Labour); Laurence Walsh (Labour)

Gorse Hill was an electoral ward of Trafford, Greater Manchester, England. It covered parts of Stretford, including Gorse Hill, most of Trafford Park and a small part of Old Trafford.

The ward was created in 2004 largely from parts of the old Park and Talbot wards. Gorse Hill ward has always elected Labour councillors by a large margin. The ward is now largely part of the new Gorse Hill and Cornbrook ward created in 2023.

== Councillors ==
As of 2022, the councillors are David Acton (Labour), Fianna Hornby (Labour), and Laurence Walsh (Labour).

| Election | Councillor | Councillor | Councillor |
|---|---|---|---|
| 2004 | David Acton (Lab) | Mary Strickland (Lab) | Laurence Walsh (Lab) |
| 2006 | David Acton (Lab) | Mary Strickland (Lab) | Laurence Walsh (Lab) |
| 2007 | David Acton (Lab) | Mike Cordingley (Lab) | Laurence Walsh (Lab) |
| 2008 | David Acton (Lab) | Mike Cordingley (Lab) | Laurence Walsh (Lab) |
| 2010 | David Acton (Lab) | Mike Cordingley (Lab) | Laurence Walsh (Lab) |
| 2011 | David Acton (Lab) | Mike Cordingley (Lab) | Laurence Walsh (Lab) |
| 2012 | David Acton (Lab) | Mike Cordingley (Lab) | Laurence Walsh (Lab) |
| 2014 | David Acton (Lab) | Mike Cordingley (Lab) | Laurence Walsh (Lab) |
| 2015 | David Acton (Lab) | Mike Cordingley (Lab) | Laurence Walsh (Lab) |
| 2016 | David Acton (Lab) | Mike Cordingley (Lab) | Laurence Walsh (Lab) |
| 2018 | David Acton (Lab) | Mike Cordingley (Lab) | Laurence Walsh (Lab) |
| 2019 | David Acton (Lab) | Mike Cordingley (Lab) | Laurence Walsh (Lab) |
| 2021 | David Acton (Lab) | Mike Cordingley (Lab) | Laurence Walsh (Lab) |
| 2022 | David Acton (Lab) | Fianna Hornby (Lab) | Laurence Walsh (Lab) |

indicates seat up for re-election.

== Elections in the 2020s ==
=== May 2022 ===
2022
| Party | Candidate | Votes | % | ±% |
|---|---|---|---|---|
| Labour | David Acton* | 1,871 | 67.6 | |
| Labour | Fianna Hornby | 1,611 | 58.2 | |
| Conservative | Stuart Donnelly | 454 | 16.4 | |
| Conservative | Lijo John | 353 | 12.8 | |
| Green | Laura Clitheroe | 286 | 10.3 | |
| Independent | Hazel Gibb | 188 | 6.8 | |
| Green | Sanjai Patel | 182 | 6.6 | |
| Liberal Democrats | Chris Butler | 141 | 5.1 | |
| Liberal Democrats | Dawn Carberry-Power | 124 | 4.5 | |
| Majority | | | | |
| Registered electors | | 8,733 | | |
| Turnout | | 2,768 | 31.7 | |
| Labour hold | | Swing | | |
| Labour hold | | Swing | | |

=== May 2021 ===
2021
| Party | Candidate | Votes | % | ±% |
|---|---|---|---|---|
| Labour | Laurence Walsh* | 2,114 | 70.3 | ▲4.6 |
| Conservative | Ivan Voronov | 513 | 17.1 | ▲0.7 |
| Green | Sanjai Patel | 212 | 7.1 | ▲1.6 |
| Liberal Democrats | Dawn Carberry-Power | 140 | 4.7 | ▲2.3 |
| Majority | | 1,601 | 53.2 | ▲3.9 |
| Rejected ballots | | 28 | | |
| Registered electors | | 8,666 | | |
| Turnout | | 3,007 | 34.7 | ▲0.2 |
| Labour hold | | Swing | ▲2.0 | |

== Elections in the 2010s ==
=== May 2019 ===
2019
| Party | Candidate | Votes | % | ±% |
|---|---|---|---|---|
| Labour | Mike Cordingley* | 1,703 | 65.3 | ▼7.7 |
| Conservative | Gareth Parker | 310 | 11.9 | ▼5.5 |
| Green | Jennie Wadsworth | 252 | 9.6 | ▲5.5 |
| UKIP | Seamus Martin | 212 | 8.1 | ▲5.7 |
| Liberal Democrats | Adam Dean | 129 | 4.9 | ▲1.7 |
| Majority | | 1,393 | 53.4 | ▼2.2 |
| Registered electors | | 8,391 | | |
| Turnout | | 2,606 | 31.22 | ▼2.3 |
| Labour hold | | Swing | | |

=== May 2018 ===
2018
| Party | Candidate | Votes | % | ±% |
|---|---|---|---|---|
| Labour | David Acton* | 2,039 | 73.0 | +7.1 |
| Conservative | Lijo John | 485 | 17.4 | +0.9 |
| Green | Joe Ryan | 115 | 4.1 | −1.4 |
| Liberal Democrats | Dawn Carberry-Power | 88 | 3.2 | +0.8 |
| UKIP | Seamus Martin | 66 | 2.4 | −7.4 |
| Majority | | 1,554 | 55.6 | +6.2 |
| Turnout | | 2,793 | 33.5 | −1.0 |
| Labour hold | | Swing | | |

=== May 2016 ===
2016
| Party | Candidate | Votes | % | ±% |
|---|---|---|---|---|
| Labour | Laurence Walsh* | 1,760 | 65.7 | +2.5 |
| Conservative | Lijo John | 440 | 16.4 | −8.7 |
| UKIP | Pauline Royle | 261 | 9.7 | −1.6 |
| Green | Jennie Wadsworth | 146 | 5.5 | −5.9 |
| Liberal Democrats | Simon Lepori | 65 | 2.4 | −3.1 |
| Majority | | 1,320 | 49.3 | +11.2 |
| Turnout | | 2,678 | 34.5 | −28.2 |
| Labour hold | | Swing | | |

=== May 2015 ===
2015
| Party | Candidate | Votes | % | ±% |
|---|---|---|---|---|
| Labour | Mike Cordingley* | 3,078 | 63.4 | −4.4 |
| Conservative | Lijo John | 1,225 | 25.2 | +5.7 |
| Green | Nigel Woodcock | 551 | 11.4 | +3.9 |
| Majority | | 1,853 | 38.2 | −10.0 |
| Turnout | | 4,854 | 62.7 | +29.8 |
| Labour hold | | Swing | | |

=== May 2014 ===
2014
| Party | Candidate | Votes | % | ±% |
|---|---|---|---|---|
| Labour | David Acton* | 1,666 | 63.6 | −8.1 |
| Conservative | Mark Cawdrey | 496 | 18.9 | +2.7 |
| Green | Nigel Woodcock | 346 | 13.2 | +4.6 |
| Liberal Democrats | Renee Matthews | 111 | 4.2 | +0.6 |
| Majority | | 953 | 35.8 | −19.1 |
| Turnout | | 2,619 | 36.4 | +4.7 |
| Labour hold | | Swing | | |

=== May 2012 ===
2012
| Party | Candidate | Votes | % | ±% |
|---|---|---|---|---|
| Labour | Laurence Walsh* | 1,633 | 71.7 | +3.9 |
| Conservative | Samuel Martin | 368 | 16.2 | −3.3 |
| Green | Philip Leape | 196 | 8.6 | +1.1 |
| Liberal Democrats | Renee Matthews | 81 | 3.6 | −1.6 |
| Majority | | 1,265 | 55.5 | +7.3 |
| Turnout | | 2,278 | 31.1 | −1.8 |
| Labour hold | | Swing | | |

=== May 2011 ===
2011
| Party | Candidate | Votes | % | ±% |
|---|---|---|---|---|
| Labour | Michael Cordingley* | 1,787 | 67.8 | +9.2 |
| Conservative | Samuel Martin | 515 | 19.5 | −0.1 |
| Green | Philip Leape | 198 | 7.5 | +2.9 |
| Liberal Democrats | Renee Matthews | 137 | 5.2 | −12.0 |
| Majority | | 1,272 | 48.2 | +9.3 |
| Turnout | | 2,637 | 32.9 | −25.3 |
| Labour hold | | Swing | | |

=== May 2010 ===
2010
| Party | Candidate | Votes | % | ±% |
|---|---|---|---|---|
| Labour | David Acton* | 2,721 | 58.6 | +6.3 |
| Conservative | Colin Levenston | 913 | 19.6 | −8.0 |
| Liberal Democrats | Frank Beswick | 801 | 17.2 | +5.5 |
| Green | Philip Leape | 212 | 4.6 | −3.9 |
| Majority | | 1,808 | 38.9 | +14.2 |
| Turnout | | 4,647 | 58.2 | +30.5 |
| Labour hold | | Swing | | |

== Elections in the 2000s ==
=== May 2008 ===
2008
| Party | Candidate | Votes | % | ±% |
|---|---|---|---|---|
| Labour | Laurence Walsh* | 1,170 | 52.3 | −5.6 |
| Conservative | Colin Levenston | 617 | 27.6 | +4.4 |
| Liberal Democrats | Francis Beswick | 262 | 11.7 | +4.5 |
| Green | Philip Leape | 189 | 8.5 | −3.3 |
| Majority | | 553 | 24.7 | −6.2 |
| Turnout | | 2,238 | 27.7 | −1.1 |
| Labour hold | | Swing | | |

=== May 2007 ===
2007 (2 vacancies)
| Party | Candidate | Votes | % | ±% |
|---|---|---|---|---|
| Labour | Mike Cordingley | 1,211 | 30.0 | +4.5 |
| Labour | Laurence Walsh* | 1,125 | 27.9 | +0.3 |
| Conservative | Colin Levenston | 502 | 12.5 | +0.2 |
| Conservative | Graeme Levenston | 431 | 10.7 | −3.4 |
| Liberal Democrats | Francis Beswick | 290 | 7.2 | +7.2 |
| Green | Sarah King | 264 | 6.6 | +1.3 |
| Green | Philip Leape | 208 | 5.2 | −1.5 |
| Majority | | 623 | 30.9 | +0.2 |
| Turnout | | 4,031 | 28.8 | +1.5 |
| Labour hold | | Swing | | |
| Labour hold | | Swing | | |

=== May 2006 ===
2006
| Party | Candidate | Votes | % | ±% |
|---|---|---|---|---|
| Labour | David Acton* | 1,112 | 55.5 | −3.4 |
| Conservative | George Manley | 496 | 24.8 | −7.1 |
| Green | Philip Leape | 238 | 11.9 | +11.9 |
| Independent | Colin Hendrie | 156 | 7.8 | +7.8 |
| Majority | | 616 | 30.7 | +8.6 |
| Turnout | | 2,002 | 27.3 | −5.5 |
| Labour hold | | Swing | | |

=== May 2004 ===
2004 (after boundary changes)
| Party | Candidate | Votes | % | ±% |
|---|---|---|---|---|
| Labour | Mary Strickland* | 1,245 | 20.4 | |
| Labour | Laurence Walsh* | 1,222 | 19.9 | |
| Labour | David Acton* | 1,139 | 18.6 | |
| Conservative | Alison Levenston | 687 | 11.2 | |
| Conservative | Colin Levenston | 654 | 10.7 | |
| Conservative | Graeme Levenston | 614 | 10.0 | |
| Liberal Democrats | Hazel Shacklock | 573 | 9.3 | |
| Turnout | | 6,134 | 32.8 | |
| Labour win (new seat) | | | | |
| Labour win (new seat) | | | | |
| Labour win (new seat) | | | | |
