= Tom Ross (politician) =

British politician

Leader of Trafford Metropolitan Borough Council
- Incumbent
- Assumed office 4 January 2023
- Preceded by: Andrew Western

Member of the Greater Manchester Combined Authority
- Incumbent
- Assumed office January 2023
- Preceded by: Andrew Western

Member of Trafford Metropolitan Borough Council for Stretford
- Incumbent
- Assumed office 1 May 2008

Personal details
- Party: Labour

Tom William Ross (born 1981) is a British Labour politician and leader of Trafford Metropolitan Borough Council in Greater Manchester. As leader he is also a member of the Greater Manchester Combined Authority and is the combined authority's portfolio lead for the Green City-Region.

Prior to becoming leader, he was the council's executive member for finance and governance and was Mayor of Trafford, a ceremonial position, during the 2018–2019 municipal year.

First elected to the council in 2008, Ross is the councillor for Stretford and Humphrey Park. He was elected as council leader on 4 January 2023, following his predecessor Andrew Western's election as Member of Parliament for Stretford and Urmston.

== Early life ==
Ross was educated at Altrincham Grammar School for Boys.

== Outside politics ==
In February 2023, Ross was one of the first people to complete the 186-mile (299 km) GM Ringway long-distance walking trail in its entirety, over the course of around one year.

== Elections contested ==
=== Trafford Metropolitan Borough Council elections ===
| Date | Ward | Party | Votes | % votes | Position | Ref. |
|---|---|---|---|---|---|---|
| 2004 | Village | Labour | 603 | 16.8 | 7th of 7 | |
| 2004 by-election | Timperley | Labour | 349 | 15.5 | 3rd of 3 | |
| 2006 | St. Mary's | Labour | 833 | 28.0 | 2nd of 4 | |
| 2007 | St. Mary's | Labour | 783 | 26.2 | 2nd of 5 | |
| 2008 | Stretford | Labour | 1,345 | 49.7 | Won | |
| 2012 | Stretford | Labour | 1,666 | 62.4 | Won | |
| 2016 | Stretford | Labour | 2,004 | 66.6 | Won | |
| 2021 | Stretford | Labour | 2,160 | 66.7 | Won | |
| 2023 | Stretford and Humphrey Park | Labour | 1,851 | 60.1 | Won | |
| 2024 | Stretford and Humphrey Park | Labour | 2,032 | 59.0 | Won | |

Political offices
| Preceded by Andrew Western | Leader of Trafford Metropolitan Borough Council; 2023- | Incumbent |
