= Urmston (ward) =

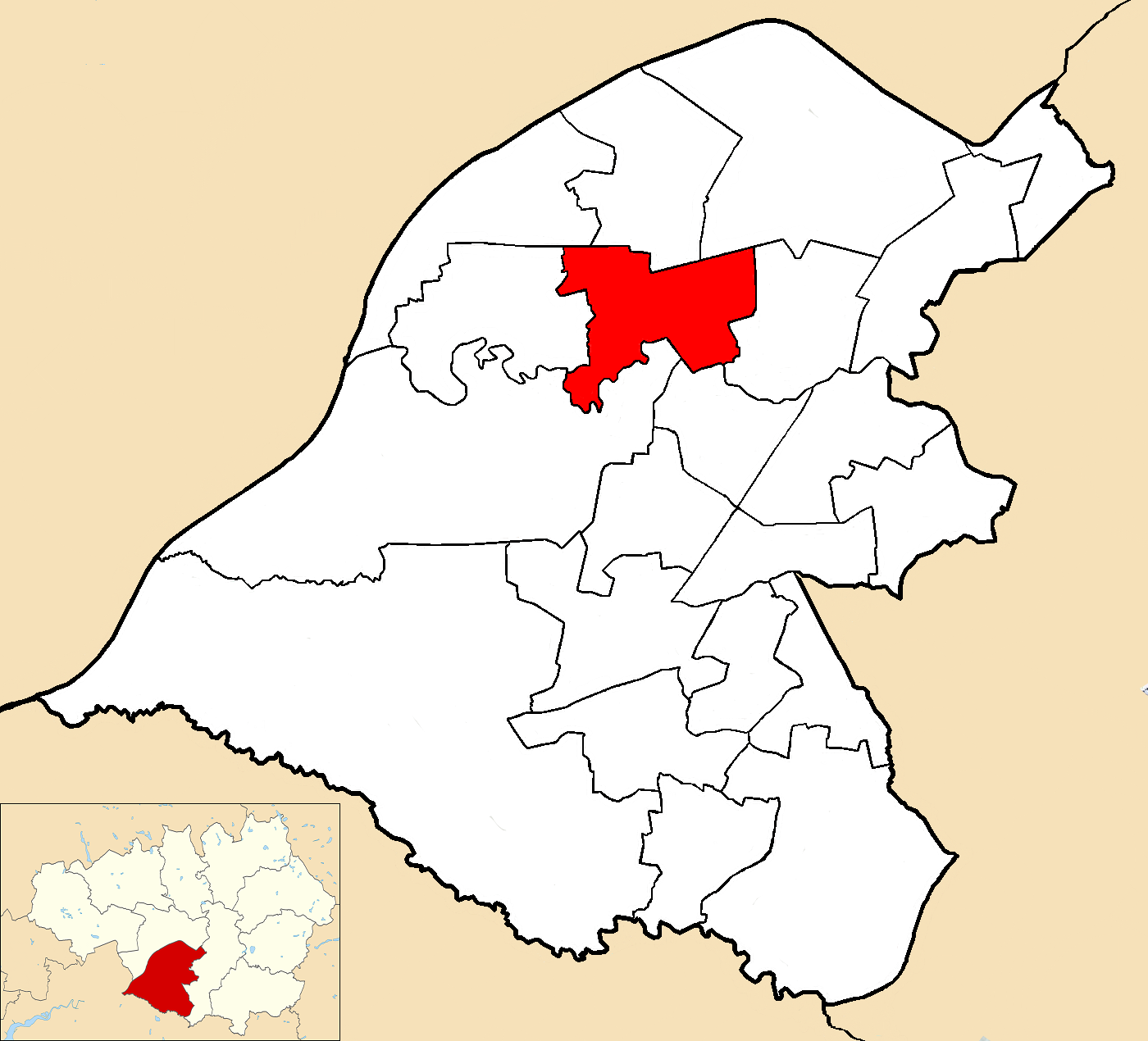
- Urmston within Trafford
- Population: 11,271
- Metropolitan borough: Trafford
- Metropolitan county: Greater Manchester
- Country: England
- Sovereign state: United Kingdom
- UK Parliament: Stretford and Urmston
- Councillors: Kevin Procter (Labour); Joanne Harding (Labour); Catherine Hynes (Labour)

Urmston is an electoral ward of Trafford, Greater Manchester, covering most of the town of Urmston, including the Town Centre, and a small part of Flixton.

== Councillors ==
- Kevin Procter (Labour)
- Joanne Harding (Labour)
- Catherine Hynes (Labour)

Election	Councillor	Councillor	Councillor
1973	Allan Coupe (Con)	Ruth Royle-Higginson (Con)	Gwen Davies (Lib)
1975	Allan Coupe (Con)	Ruth Royle-Higginson (Con)	Anthony Platt (Con)
1976	Allan Coupe (Con)	Ruth Royle-Higginson (Con)	Anthony Platt (Con)
1978	Allan Coupe (Con)	Ruth Royle-Higginson (Con)	Anthony Platt (Con)
1979	Allan Coupe (Con)	Ruth Royle-Higginson (Con)	Anthony Platt (Con)
1980	Allan Coupe (Con)	D. Horner (Lab)	Anthony Platt (Con)
1982	Allan Coupe (Con)	D. Horner (Lab)	Anthony Platt (Con)
1983	Allan Coupe (Con)	Colin Warbrick (Con)	A. Brown (Con)
1984	Allan Coupe (Con)	Colin Warbrick (Con)	A. Brown (Con)
Mar 1986	Allan Coupe (Con)	Colin Warbrick (Con)	David Acton (Lab)
1986	James Hanrahan (Lab)	Colin Warbrick (Con)	David Acton (Lab)
1987	James Hanrahan (Lab)	Colin Warbrick (Con)	Eric May (Con)
1988	James Hanrahan (Lab)	Colin Warbrick (Con)	Eric May (Con)
Nov 1988	David Acton (Lab)	Colin Warbrick (Con)	Eric May (Con)
1990	David Acton (Lab)	Colin Warbrick (Con)	Eric May (Con)
1991	David Acton (Lab)	Colin Warbrick (Con)	Eric May (Con)
1992	David Acton (Lab)	Colin Warbrick (Con)	Eric May (Con)
1994	David Acton (Lab)	Colin Warbrick (Con)	Eric May (Con)
1995	David Acton (Lab)	Colin Warbrick (Con)	Joyce Acton (Lab)
1996	David Acton (Lab)	Bill Clarke (Lab)	Joyce Acton (Lab)
1998	David Acton (Lab)	Bill Clarke (Lab)	Joyce Acton (Lab)
1999	David Acton (Lab)	Bill Clarke (Lab)	Joyce Acton (Lab)
2000	David Acton (Lab)	Bill Clarke (Lab)	Joyce Acton (Lab)
2002	David Acton (Lab)	Bill Clarke (Lab)	Joyce Acton (Lab)
2003	David Acton (Lab)	Bill Clarke (Lab)	Joyce Acton (Lab)
2004	Christine Turner (Con)	Angela Roberts (Con)	James Wibberley (Con)
2006	Christine Turner (Con)	Angela Roberts (Con)	James Wibberley (Con)
2007	Christine Turner (Con)	Eddie Kelson (Con)	James Wibberley (Con)
2008	Christine Turner (Con)	Eddie Kelson (Con)	James Wibberley (Con)
2010	Christine Turner (Con)	Eddie Kelson (Con)	Kevin Procter (Lab)
2011	Christine Turner (Con)	Joanne Harding (Lab)	Kevin Procter (Lab)
2012	Catherine Hynes (Lab)	Joanne Harding (Lab)	Kevin Procter (Lab)
2014	Catherine Hynes (Lab)	Joanne Harding (Lab)	Kevin Procter (Lab)
2015	Catherine Hynes (Lab)	Joanne Harding (Lab)	Kevin Procter (Lab)
2016	Catherine Hynes (Lab)	Joanne Harding (Lab)	Kevin Procter (Lab)
2018	Catherine Hynes (Lab)	Joanne Harding (Lab)	Kevin Procter (Lab)
2019	Catherine Hynes (Lab)	Joanne Harding (Lab)	Kevin Procter (Lab)
2021	Catherine Hynes (Lab)	Joanne Harding (Lab)	Kevin Procter (Lab)
2022	Catherine Hynes (Lab)	Joanne Harding (Lab)	Kevin Procter (Lab)
2023	Joanne Harding (Lab)	Catherine Hynes (Lab)	Kevin Procter (Lab)
2024	Catherine Hynes (Lab)	Joanne Harding (Lab)	Kevin Procter (Lab)

Indicates seat up for re-election. Indicates a by-election.

== Elections in the 2020s ==
=== May 2026 ===
2026
Party	Candidate	Votes	%	±%
Labour	Clare Sheridan	1,555	36.0	−21.1
Reform	Dave Stubbs	1,130	26.1	+18.1
Green	Steve Tennant	897	20.8	+10.6
Conservative	Ali Aydogdu	468	10.8	−2.8
Liberal Democrats	John Franklin-Johnston	227	5.3	+1.4
Advance UK	Paul Regan	36	0.8	N/A
Majority		425	9.8	−33.7
Rejected ballots		9	0.2	-0.4
Turnout		4,322	49.6	+9.1
Registered electors		8,716		
Labour hold		Swing	-19.6	

=== May 2024 ===
2024
Party	Candidate	Votes	%	±%
Labour	Kevin Procter*	1,975	57.1	−5.8
Conservative	Ali Aydogdu	471	13.6	−9.7
Green	Steven Tennant	354	10.2	−4.3
Reform	Steve Dillon	278	8.0	N/A
Independent	Andrew Beaumont	236	6.8	N/A
Liberal Democrats	John Franklin-Johnston	135	3.9	−3.0
Majority		1,504	43.5	+14.0
Rejected ballots		21	0.6	-0.6
Turnout		3,461	40.5	+1.7
Registered electors		8,543		
Labour hold		Swing	+2.0	

=== May 2023 ===
2023 (3)
Party	Candidate	Votes	%	±%
Labour	Joanne Harding*	2,044	62.9%	
Labour	Catherine Hynes*	1,889	57.2%	
Labour	Kevin Procter*	1,743	52.8%	
Conservative	Christine Mitchell	770	23.3%	
Conservative	Lijo John	685	20.8%	
Conservative	Julius Sulle	628	19.0%	
Green	Kate Westbrook	478	14.5%	
Green	Steven Tennant-Smythe	301	9.1%	
Green	Luciya Whyte	298	9.0%	
Liberal Democrats	John Franklin-Johnston	227	6.9%	
Majority				
Rejected ballots		39	1.2%	
Turnout		3,300	38.8%	
Registered electors		8,507		

=== May 2022 ===
2022
Party	Candidate	Votes	%	±%
Labour	Kevin Procter*	2,043	59.4	
Conservative	Veja Gorania	894	26.0	
Green	Luciya Whyte	291	8.5	
Liberal Democrats	John Franklin-Johnston	192	5.6	
Majority		1,149	33.4	
Registered electors		8,439		
Turnout		3,440	40.8	
Labour hold		Swing		

=== May 2021 ===
2021
Party	Candidate	Votes	%	±%
Labour Co-op	Cath Hynes*	2,214	58.1	▲3.5
Conservative	Anand Chinthala	1,101	28.8	▲7.4
Green	Luciya Whyte	324	8.5	▼0.1
Liberal Democrats	John Franklin-Johnston	141	3.7	▼1.5
Majority		1,113	29.2	▲4.0
Registered electors		8,496		
Turnout		3,813	44.9	▲4.8
Labour hold		Swing		

== Elections in the 2010s ==
=== May 2019 ===
2019
Party	Candidate	Votes	%	±%
Labour Co-op	Jo Harding*	1,844	54.6	▼3.2
Conservative	John Lijo	724	21.4	▼9.9
UKIP	Krissy Douglas	340	10.1	▲6.5
Green	Luciya Whyte	290	8.6	▲4.0
Liberal Democrats	Shaun Ennis	179	5.3	▲2.0
Majority		1,120	33.2	▲6.8
Registered electors		8,472		
Turnout		3,394	40.06	▼5.24
Labour hold		Swing		

=== May 2018 ===
2018
Party	Candidate	Votes	%	±%
Labour	Kevin Procter*	2,243	57.8	+9.9
Conservative	Michelle McGrath	1,217	31.3	−5.8
Green	Timothy Woodward	155	4.0	+0.2
UKIP	Krissy Douglas	138	3.6	−5.3
Liberal Democrats	Kirsty Cullen	130	3.3	+0.9
Majority		1,026	26.4	
Turnout		3,883	45.3	−1.4
Labour hold		Swing		

=== May 2016 ===
2016
Party	Candidate	Votes	%	±%
Labour	Catherine Hynes*	1,830	47.9	+4.3
Conservative	Christine Turner	1,419	37.1	−0.2
UKIP	Andrew Beaumont	340	8.9	−1.9
Green	Geraldine Coggins	144	3.8	−1.7
Liberal Democrats	Kirsty Cullen	91	2.4	−0.4
Majority		411	10.7	+4.4
Turnout		3,824	46.7	−23.9
Labour hold		Swing		

=== May 2015 ===
2015
Party	Candidate	Votes	%	±%
Labour	Joanne Harding*	2,506	43.6	+4.5
Conservative	Christine Turner	2,146	37.3	+2.7
UKIP	Andrew Beaumont	621	10.8	−7.1
Green	Paul Syrett	318	5.5	−0.8
Liberal Democrats	Kirstie Davidson	162	2.8	+0.8
Majority		360	6.3	+1.8
Turnout		5,753	70.6	+24.6
Labour hold		Swing		

=== May 2014 ===
2014
Party	Candidate	Votes	%	±%
Labour	Kevin Procter*	1,327	39.1	−6.5
Conservative	Christine Turner	1,175	34.6	−5.4
UKIP	Peter Killick	608	17.9	+11.7
Green	Geraldine Coggins	214	6.3	+1.7
Liberal Democrats	Wayne Harrison	69	2.0	−0.7
Majority		152	4.5	−0.1
Turnout		3,393	42.1	
Labour hold		Swing		

=== May 2012 ===
2012
Party	Candidate	Votes	%	±%
Labour	Catherine Hynes	1,453	45.6	−2.7
Conservative	Christine Turner*	1,304	41.0	+2.1
UKIP	Robert	196	6.2	+2.5
Green	Paul Syrett	145	4.6	−0.7
Liberal Democrats	Alan Sherliker	86	2.7	−1.1
Majority		149	4.7	−4.6
Turnout		3,184	40.4	−5.6
Labour gain from Conservative		Swing		

=== May 2011 ===
2011
Party	Candidate	Votes	%	±%
Labour	Joanne Harding	1,786	48.3	+5.9
Conservative	Eddie Kelson*	1,441	38.9	+1.1
Green	Helen Jocys	196	5.3	+0.6
Liberal Democrats	Paul Hurst	142	3.8	−11.4
UKIP	Robert	136	3.7	+3.7
Majority		345	9.3	+4.7
Turnout		3,701	46.0	−21.5
Labour gain from Conservative		Swing		

=== May 2010 ===
2010
Party	Candidate	Votes	%	±%
Labour	Kevin Procter	2,292	42.4	+9.0
Conservative	James Wibberley*	2,042	37.8	−2.0
Liberal Democrats	Louise Bird	821	15.2	−5.9
Green	Helen Jocys	252	4.7	−1.0
Majority		250	4.6	−1.8
Turnout		5,407	67.5	+25.6
Labour gain from Conservative		Swing		

== Elections in the 2000s ==
=== May 2008 ===
2008
Party	Candidate	Votes	%	±%
Conservative	Christine Turner*	1,346	39.8	−3.8
Labour	Joyce Acton	1,129	33.4	−5.9
Liberal Democrats	Bernard Murray	714	21.1	+12.9
Green	Helen Jocys	191	5.7	−3.2
Majority		217	6.4	+2.1
Turnout		3,380	41.9	−0.8
Conservative hold		Swing		

=== May 2007 ===
2007
Party	Candidate	Votes	%	±%
Conservative	Eddie Kelson	1,450	43.6	−2.8
Labour	William Clarke	1,308	39.3	−0.7
Green	Helen Jocys	296	8.9	−4.7
Liberal Democrats	Graham Rogers	272	8.2	+8.2
Majority		142	4.3	−2.1
Turnout		3,326	42.7	+0.3
Conservative hold		Swing		

=== May 2006 ===
2006
Party	Candidate	Votes	%	±%
Conservative	James Wibberley*	1,507	46.4	−3.6
Labour	William Clarke	1,299	40.0	−2.9
Green	Helen Jocys	442	13.6	+6.6
Majority		208	6.4	+3.2
Turnout		3,248	42.4	−8.5
Conservative hold		Swing		

=== May 2004 ===
2004 (after boundary changes)
Party	Candidate	Votes	%	±%
Conservative	Christine Turner	1,747	17.2	
Conservative	Angela Roberts	1,678	16.5	
Conservative	James Wibberley	1,658	16.3	
Labour	Joyce Acton*	1,549	15.3	
Labour	William Clarke*	1,434	14.1	
Labour	Ian McDermott*	1,366	13.5	
Green	Helen Jocys	715	7.0	
Turnout		10,147	50.9	
Conservative win (new seat)				
Conservative win (new seat)				
Conservative win (new seat)				

=== May 2003 ===
2003
Party	Candidate	Votes	%	±%
Labour	Joyce Acton*	1,912	45.6	−11.2
Conservative	Christine Turner	1,808	43.2	+0.0
Green	Helen Jocys	470	11.2	+11.2
Majority		104	2.4	−11.2
Turnout		4,190	56.6	+2.6
Labour hold		Swing		

=== May 2002 ===
2002
Party	Candidate	Votes	%	±%
Labour	David Acton*	2,323	56.8	+2.9
Conservative	Christine Turner	1,765	43.2	−3.0
Majority		558	13.6	+5.9
Turnout		4,088	54.0	+12.7
Labour hold		Swing		

=== May 2000 ===
2000
Party	Candidate	Votes	%	±%
Labour	William Clarke*	1,679	53.9	+2.2
Conservative	David Nicklin	1,439	46.2	+3.1
Majority		240	7.7	−0.9
Turnout		3,118	41.3	+4.6
Labour hold		Swing		

== Elections in the 1990s ==
1999
Party	Candidate	Votes	%	±%
Labour	J Acton*	1,420	51.7	−7.2
Conservative	Nicklin	1,184	43.1	+4.8
Liberal Democrats	Elliot	142	5.2	+5.2
Majority		236	8.6	−12.0
Turnout		2,746	36.7	−0.4
Labour hold		Swing		

1998
Party	Candidate	Votes	%	±%
Labour	D. Acton*	1,645	58.9	−3.0
Conservative	D. M. H. Nicklin	1,068	38.3	+0.2
Independent	N. J. Barrett	78	2.8	
Majority		577	20.6	−3.2
Turnout		2,791	37.1	−6.0
Labour hold		Swing		

1996
Party	Candidate	Votes	%	±%
Labour	W. Clarke	1,961	61.9	−0.6
Conservative	A. Smith	1,208	38.1	+0.6
Majority		753	23.8	−1.1
Turnout		3,169	43.1	−4.9
Labour gain from Conservative		Swing		

1995
Party	Candidate	Votes	%	±%
Labour	J. Acton	2,221	62.5	+1.9
Conservative	E. May*	1,335	37.5	−1.9
Majority		886	24.9	+3.8
Turnout		3,556	48.0	−1.8
Labour gain from Conservative		Swing		

1994
Party	Candidate	Votes	%	±%
Labour	D. Acton*	2,244	60.6	+20.2
Conservative	A. Smith	1,461	39.4	−16.3
Majority		783	21.1	+5.8
Turnout		3,705	49.8	+2.3
Labour hold		Swing		

1992
Party	Candidate	Votes	%	±%
Conservative	C. Warbrick*	2,001	55.7	+5.5
Labour	L. M. Seex	1,451	40.4	−9.4
Liberal Democrats	D. J. Kelly	143	4.0	+4.0
Majority		550	15.3	+14.9
Turnout		3,595	47.5	−3.0
Conservative hold		Swing		

1991
Party	Candidate	Votes	%	±%
Conservative	E. May*	1,950	50.2	+8.0
Labour	L. M. Seex	1,935	49.8	−0.8
Majority		15	0.4	−8.0
Turnout		3,885	50.5	−2.6
Conservative hold		Swing		

1990
Party	Candidate	Votes	%	±%
Labour	D. Acton*	2,105	50.6	+5.1
Conservative	J. G. Graham	1,754	42.2	−5.0
Green	H. E. Jocys	297	7.1	+7.1
Majority		351	8.4	+6.8
Turnout		4,156	53.1	+2.2
Labour hold		Swing		

== Elections in the 1980s ==
By-Election 24 November 1988
Party	Candidate	Votes	%	±%
Labour	D. Acton	1,563	52.6	+7.1
Conservative	J. G. Graham	1,406	47.4	+0.2
Majority		157	5.3	+3.7
Turnout		2,969	37.2	+14.3
Labour hold		Swing		

1988
Party	Candidate	Votes	%	±%
Conservative	C. Warbrick*	1,913	47.2	−1.0
Labour	D. Acton	1,847	45.5	+5.9
Liberal Democrats	P. J. Carlon	295	7.3	−7.9
Majority		66	1.6	−6.9
Turnout		4,055	50.9	−4.9
Conservative hold		Swing		

1987
Party	Candidate	Votes	%	±%
Conservative	E. May	2,076	46.7	+6.4
Labour	D. Acton*	1,708	38.5	−4.7
SDP	P. J. Carlon	657	14.8	−1.8
Majority		368	8.3	+5.4
Turnout		4,441	55.8	+10.1
Conservative gain from Labour		Swing		

1986
Party	Candidate	Votes	%	±%
Labour	J. G. Hanrahan	1,572	43.2	+3.9
Conservative	A. R. Coupe*	1,467	40.3	−3.7
SDP	P. J. Carlon	603	16.6	−0.1
Majority		105	2.9	−1.7
Turnout		3,642	45.7	+1.7
Labour gain from Conservative		Swing		

By-Election 6 March 1986
Party	Candidate	Votes	%	±%
Labour	D. Acton	1,321	44.7	+5.4
Conservative	E. May	871	29.5	−14.5
SDP	P. J. Carlon	762	25.8	+9.1
Majority		450	15.2	+10.6
Turnout		2,954	37.1	−6.9
Labour gain from Conservative		Swing		

1984
Party	Candidate	Votes	%	±%
Conservative	C. Warbrick*	1,515	44.0	−1.0
Labour	D. Acton	1,355	39.3	+7.1
SDP	P. J. Carlon	576	16.7	−6.2
Majority		160	4.6	+0.1
Turnout		3,446	44.0	−6.2
Conservative hold		Swing		

1983 (2 vacancies)
Party	Candidate	Votes	%	±%
Conservative	A. L. Brown	1,706	23.2	−0.3
Conservative	C. Warbrick	1,600	21.8	−3.1
Labour	D. Acton	1,269	17.3	+7.8
Labour	A. G. Hodson	1,095	14.9	+3.0
SDP	P. J. Carlon	867	11.8	−2.9
SDP	H. Laffey	815	11.1	−4.3
Majority		331	4.5	−15.5
Turnout		7,352	50.2	+2.7
Conservative hold		Swing		
Conservative gain from Labour		Swing		

1982
Party	Candidate	Votes	%	±%
Conservative	A. R. Coupe*	1,736	46.7	−1.1
Labour	D. Acton	994	26.8	−25.4
SDP	P. J. Carlon	985	26.5	+26.5
Majority		742	20.0	+15.7
Turnout		3,715	47.5	+5.3
Conservative hold		Swing		

1980
Party	Candidate	Votes	%	±%
Labour	D. Horner	1,686	52.2	+25.1
Conservative	R. V. Royle-Higginson*	1,546	47.8	−3.0
Majority		140	4.3	−19.5
Turnout		3,232	42.2	−35.5
Labour gain from Conservative		Swing		

== Elections in the 1970s ==
1979
Party	Candidate	Votes	%	±%
Conservative	A. H. Platt*	3,381	50.8	−8.0
Labour	D. Horner	1,801	27.1	−1.6
Liberal	D. E. Unwin	1,469	22.1	+9.6
Majority		1,580	23.8	−6.3
Turnout		6,651	77.7	+43.1
Conservative hold		Swing		

1978
Party	Candidate	Votes	%	±%
Conservative	A. R. Coupe*	1,725	58.8	+2.0
Labour	D. Horner	842	28.7	+4.6
Liberal	D. E. Unwin	367	12.5	−6.6
Majority		883	30.1	−2.6
Turnout		2,934	34.6	−3.0
Conservative hold		Swing		

1976
Party	Candidate	Votes	%	±%
Conservative	R. V. Royle-Higginson*	1,798	56.8	+2.3
Labour	D. T. Taylor	763	24.1	+0.5
Liberal	A. Scanlon	604	19.1	−2.8
Majority		1,035	32.7	+1.9
Turnout		3,165	37.6	−5.7
Conservative hold		Swing		

1975
Party	Candidate	Votes	%	±%
Conservative	A. H. Platt	1,968	54.5	
Labour	D. T. Taylor	854	23.6	
Liberal	G. Davies*	790	21.9	
Majority		1,114	30.8	
Turnout		3,612	43.3	
Conservative gain from Liberal		Swing		

1973
Party	Candidate	Votes	%	±%
Conservative	A. R. Coupe	1,323	38.5	
Conservative	R. V. Royle-Higginson	1,270		
Liberal	G. Davies	1,262	36.8	
Liberal	J. Tame	1,261		
Conservative	A. Platt	1,208		
Liberal	A. Dickinson	1,169		
Labour	D. O'Kelly	849	24.7	
Labour	D. Watts	772		
Labour	W. Williams	769		
Majority		1		
Turnout		3,434	39.3	
Conservative win (new seat)				
Conservative win (new seat)				
Liberal win (new seat)				
