= 2014 Trafford Metropolitan Borough Council election =

2014 UK local government election

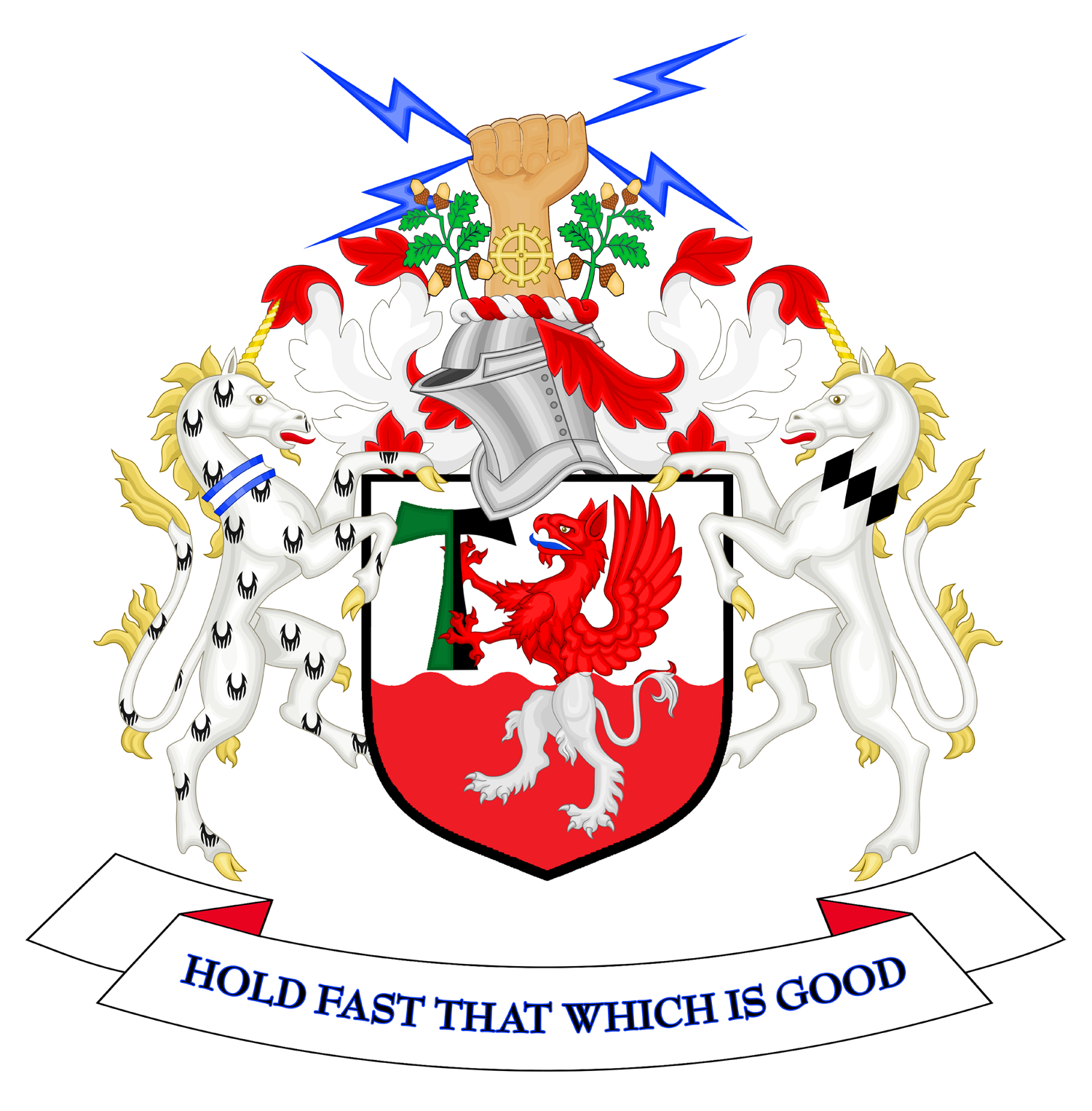
← 2012	22 May 2014	2015 →

22 of 63 seats to Trafford Metropolitan Borough Council 32 seats needed for a majority
	First party	Second party	Third party
Leader	Sean Anstee	David Acton	Ray Bowker
Party	Conservative	Labour	Liberal Democrats
Leader's seat	Bowdon	Gorse Hill	Village
Last election	10 seats, 39.5%	9 seats, 41.8%	2 seats, 9.3%
Seats before	33	26	4
Seats won	12	9	1
Seats after	33	27	3
Seat change	Steady	▲1	▼1
Popular vote	26,427	25,221	5,311
Percentage	39.4%	37.6%	7.9%
Swing	▼0.1%	▼4.2%	▼1.4%
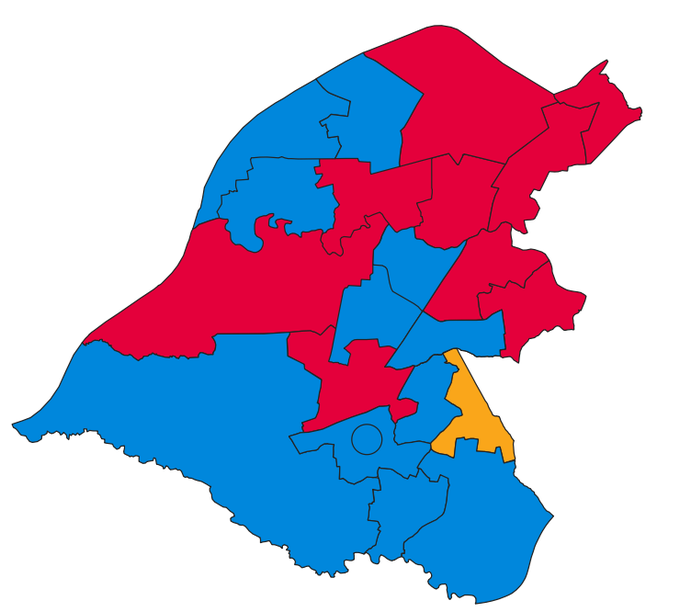
- Map of results of 2014 election
Leader of the Council before election
Sean Anstee
Conservative
Leader of the Council after election
Sean Anstee
Conservative

A Trafford Metropolitan Borough Council election took place on 22 May 2014 to elect members of Trafford Metropolitan Borough Council in England. This was on the same day as other local elections. One third of the council was up for election, with each successful candidate serving a four-year term of office, expiring in 2018. The Conservative Party held overall control of the council.

== Election result ==
Party	Votes		Seats			Full Council	
Conservative Party	26,427 (39.4%)	▼0.1	12 (54.5%)	12 / 22	Steady	33 (52.4%)	33 / 63
Labour Party	25,221 (37.6%)	▼4.2	9 (40.9%)	9 / 22	▲1	27 (42.9%)	27 / 63
Liberal Democrats	5,311 (7.9%)	▼1.4	1 (4.5%)	1 / 22	▼1	3 (4.8%)	3 / 63
Green Party	6,275 (9.4%)	▲1.9	0 (0.0%)	0 / 22	Steady	0 (0.0%)	0 / 63
UKIP	3,841 (5.7%)	▲4.0	0 (0.0%)	0 / 22	Steady	0 (0.0%)	0 / 63

↓
27	3	33

== Ward results ==
=== Altrincham ward ===
Altrincham (2 vacancies)
Party	Candidate	Votes	%	±%
Conservative	Matthew Sephton	1,515	48.8	−2.5
Conservative	Michael Young*	1,371	–	–
Labour	Aidan Williams	823	26.5	−6.6
Labour	Waseem Hassan	584	–	–
Green	Nick Davies	447	14.4	+5.5
Green	Caroline Robertson-Brown	347	–	–
Liberal Democrats	Julian Newgrosh	322	10.4	+3.6
Liberal Democrats	Martin Elliott	251	–	–
Majority		548	22.3	+4.4
Turnout		5,660	36.7	−27.8
Conservative hold		Swing		
Conservative hold		Swing		

=== Ashton upon Mersey ward ===
Ashton upon Mersey
Party	Candidate	Votes	%	±%
Conservative	John Lamb*	1,505	50.5	+0.4
Labour	Luckson Francis-Augustine	877	29.4	−6.2
Green	Nick Robertson-Brown	431	14.5	+6.1
Liberal Democrats	Chris Marritt	167	5.6	−0.2
Majority		628	21.1	+6.6
Turnout		2980	41.7	+2.7
Conservative hold		Swing		

=== Bowdon ward ===
Bowdon
Party	Candidate	Votes	%	±%
Conservative	Karen Barclay*	2,042	69.5	+1.2
Labour	Thomas Hague	428	11.2	−4.4
Green	Bridget Green	273	9.3	+2.2
Liberal Democrats	Kirstie Davidson	197	6.7	−0.1
Majority		1614	54.8	+2.2
Turnout		2940	40.4	+1.6
Conservative hold		Swing		

=== Broadheath ward ===
Broadheath
Party	Candidate	Votes	%	±%
Labour	Louise Dagnall	1,660	43.4	−2.9
Conservative	Jacki Wilkinson*	1,431	37.4	−1.5
UKIP	Ron George	413	10.8	+4.6
Green	Sara Ahsan	191	4.9	+0.6
Liberal Democrats	William Jones	129	3.3	−0.9
Majority		229	5.9	−1.5
Turnout		3,824	41.4	+2.6
Labour gain from Conservative		Swing		

=== Brooklands ward ===
Brooklands
Party	Candidate	Votes	%	±%
Conservative	Pam Dixon*	1,627	51.8	+3.7
Labour	Mike Green	1,052	33.5	+0.6
Green	Joe Ryan	286	9.1	+0.7
Liberal Democrats	James Eisen	200	6.4	+2.4
Majority		575	18.3	+3.1
Turnout		3,139	41	+1.4
Conservative hold		Swing		

=== Bucklow-St. Martins ward ===
Bucklow-St. Martins
Party	Candidate	Votes	%	±%
Labour	Karina Carter	1,054	53	−14.1
Conservative	Stephen Anstee	623	31.3	+10
Green	Daniel Wadsworth	253	12.7	+6.7
Liberal Democrats	Roger Legge	58	2.9	−2.8
Majority		431	21.6	−24.2
Turnout		1,988	29.9	+2.1
Labour hold		Swing		

=== Clifford ward ===
Clifford
Party	Candidate	Votes	%	±%
Labour	Sophie Taylor*	2,206	75.2	−4.6
Green	Matthew Westbrook	401	13.7	+2.6
Conservative	Asha Thomas	246	8.3	+1.5
Liberal Democrats	Louise Bird	81	2.8	+0.5
Majority		1,805	61.5	−7.1
Turnout		2,933	46.1	+10.7
Labour hold		Swing		

=== Davyhulme East ward ===
Davyhulme East
Party	Candidate	Votes	%	±%
Conservative	Mike Cornes*	1,256	42.2	−1.1
Labour	Anna Booth	973	32.7	−5.5
UKIP	Paul Pickford	509	17.1	+17.1
Green	Jennie Wadsworth	134	4.5	+1.5
Liberal Democrats	Graham Rogers	63	2.1	−13.4
Socialist Labour	Jim Flannery	41	1.4	+1.4
Majority		283	9.5	+4.4
Turnout		2,976	36.7	−3.9
Conservative hold		Swing		

=== Davyhulme West ward ===
Davyhulme West
Party	Candidate	Votes	%	±%
Conservative	June Reilly*	1,247	39.8	−7.3
Labour	George Devlin	1,164	37.1	−6.3
UKIP	Paul Regan	557	17.8	+17.8
Green	Luka Knezevic	114	3.6	−3.3
Liberal Democrats	Elizabeth Hogg	54	1.7	−0.9
Majority		83	2.6	−1
Turnout		3,136	42.9	+3.8
Conservative hold		Swing		

=== Flixton ward ===
Flixton
Party	Candidate	Votes	%	±%
Conservative	Viv Ward*	1,427	38.6	−7.7
Labour	Ged Carter	1,388	37.5	−4.1
UKIP	Chris Frost	610	16.5	+16.5
Green	Alison Cavanagh	188	5.0	−4.2
Liberal Democrats	Kirsty Cullen	86	2.3	−0.6
Majority		39	1.1	−3.6
Turnout		3,699	45.6	+5.9
Conservative hold		Swing		

=== Gorse Hill ward ===
Gorse Hill
Party	Candidate	Votes	%	±%
Labour	David Acton*	1,666	63.6	−8.1
Conservative	Mark Cawdrey	496	18.9	+2.7
Green	Nigel Woodcock	346	13.2	+4.6
Liberal Democrats	Renee Matthews	111	4.2	+0.6
Majority		953	35.8	−19.1
Turnout		2,619	36.4	+4.7
Labour hold		Swing		

=== Hale Barns ward ===
Hale Barns
Party	Candidate	Votes	%	±%
Conservative	Dylan Butt*	1,911	64.2	+2.6
Labour Co-op	Barbara Twiney	395	13.3	−2.2
UKIP	Andrew Weighell	335	11.2	+3.6
Liberal Democrats	Sandra Taylor	204	6.8	−2.3
Green	Daniel Jerome	133	4.5	−0.5
Majority		1,516	50.9	+3.6
Turnout		2,978	40.8	+3.6
Conservative hold		Swing		

=== Hale Central ward ===
Hale Central
Party	Candidate	Votes	%	±%
Conservative	Alan Mitchell*	1,646	58	+3.1
Labour Co-op	Beverley Harrison	647	22.8	+5.8
Green	Samuel Little	325	11.4	+5.3
Liberal Democrats	Craig Birtwistle	221	7.8	−14.3
Majority		999	35.2	−2.4
Turnout		2,839	39.3	32.5
Conservative hold		Swing		

=== Longford ward ===
Longford
Party	Candidate	Votes	%	±%
Labour	David Jarman*	2,003	60.8	−4.5
Conservative	James Heywood	603	18.3	−0.1
Green	Margaret Westbrook	553	16.8	+3.8
Liberal Democrats	Dawn Carberry-Power	135	4.1	+0.8
Majority		1,400	42.5	−4.3
Turnout		3294	37.9	+2.9
Labour hold		Swing		

=== Priory ward ===
Priory
Party	Candidate	Votes	%	±%
Labour Co-op	Jane Baugh*	1,609	53.7	+1.9
Conservative	Daniel Critchlow	857	28.6	−2.4
Green	Mark Hamer	322	10.7	+1.7
Liberal Democrats	Michael Macdonald	210	7.0	−1.3
Majority		752	25.1	+2.5
Turnout		2,998	39.5	+2.5
Labour hold		Swing		

=== Sale Moor ward ===
Sale Moor
Party	Candidate	Votes	%	±%
Labour	Philip Gratrix*	1,217	45.1	−4.0
Conservative	Michael Parris	772	28.6	−8.8
UKIP	Barry Higgs	408	15.1	+15.1
Green	Paul Bayliss	202	7.5	+0.1
Liberal Democrats	Kenneth Clarke	98	3.6	−2.5
Majority		445	16.5	+4.8
Turnout		2,697	36.6	−1.3
Labour hold		Swing		

=== St. Mary's ward ===
St. Mary's
Party	Candidate	Votes	%	±%
Conservative	Rob Chilton*	1,617	46.7	+3.4
Labour	James Wright	1,206	34.8	+5.2
UKIP	John Walsh	401	11.6	+7.5
Green	Phil Kilburn	134	3.9	+0.8
Liberal Democrats	Pauline Cliff	105	3.0	−16.9
Majority		411	11.9	−1.8
Turnout		3,463	40.3	
Conservative hold		Swing		

=== Stretford ward ===
Stretford
Party	Candidate	Votes	%	±%
Labour	Dolores O'Sullivan*	1,718	58.0	−4.4
Conservative	Colin Hooley	674	22.7	+4.9
Green	Liz O'Neill	471	15.9	+5.9
Liberal Democrats	David Martin	100	3.4	−0.2
Majority		1,044	35.2	−9.4
Turnout		2,963	38.7	
Labour hold		Swing		

=== Timperley ward ===
Timperley
Party	Candidate	Votes	%	±%
Conservative	Nathan Evans	1,419	38.8	+0.9
Liberal Democrats	Neil Taylor*	1,363	37.3	−4.7
Labour	Majella Dalton-Bartley	622	17.0	+3.3
Green	Jadwiga Leigh	253	6.9	+4.6
Majority		56	1.5	+5.6
Turnout		3,657	43.0	
Conservative gain from Liberal Democrats		Swing		

=== Urmston ward ===
Urmston
Party	Candidate	Votes	%	±%
Labour	Kevin Procter*	1,327	39.1	−3.3
Conservative	Christine Turner	1,175	34.6	−3.1
UKIP	Peter Killick	608	17.9	+17.9
Green	Geraldine Coggins	214	6.3	+1.6
Liberal Democrats	Wayne Harrison	69	2.0	−13.2
Majority		152	4.5	−0.1
Turnout		3,393	42.1	
Labour hold		Swing		

=== Village ward ===
Village
Party	Candidate	Votes	%	±%
Liberal Democrats	Tony Fishwick*	1,087	36.5	−9.8
Conservative	Andy Iredale	971	32.6	+0.9
Labour	Tony O'Brien	662	22.2	+3.4
Green	Michael Leigh	258	8.7	+5.6
Majority		116	3.9	−10.7
Turnout		2.978	38.4	−2.6
Liberal Democrats hold		Swing		
