= 2019 Trafford Metropolitan Borough Council election =

2019 local election in England

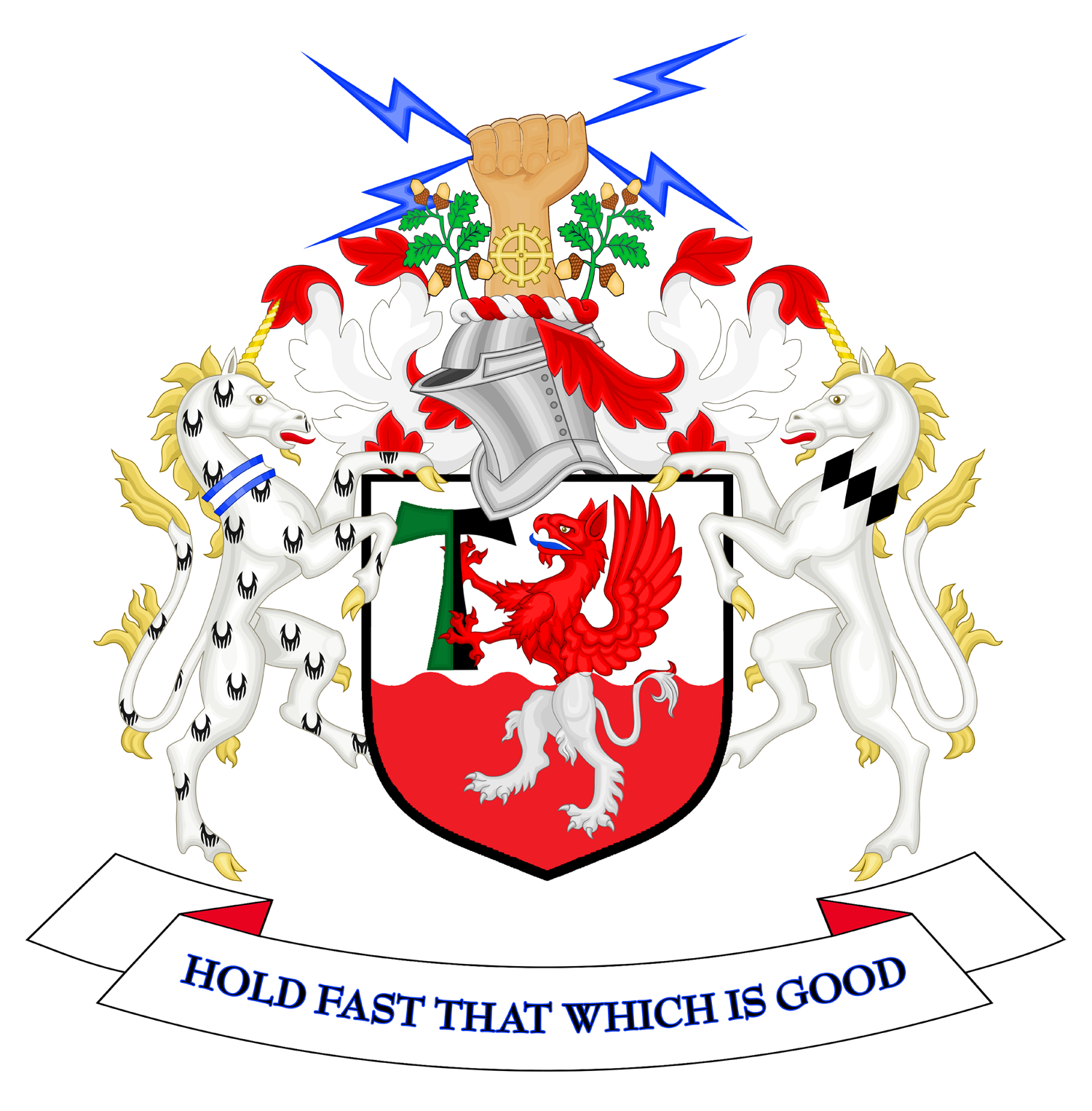
- 2 May 2019

21 of 63 seats to Trafford Metropolitan Borough Council 32 seats needed for a majority
	First party	Second party	Third party
Leader	Andrew Western	Sean Anstee	Ray Bowker
Party	Labour	Conservative	Liberal Democrats
Leader's seat	Priory	Bowdon	Village
Last election	13 seats, 47.2%	7 seats, 36.8%	0 seats, 7.3%
Seats before	30	29	2
Seats won	14	4	2
Seats after	36	20	4
Seat change	▲6	▼9	▲2
Popular vote	27,488	19,573	7,072
Percentage	41.3%	29.4%	10.6%
Swing	▼5.9%	▼7.4%	▲3.3%
	Fourth party
Leader	Geraldine Coggins
Party	Green
Leader's seat	Altrincham
Last election	2 seats, 6.6%
Seats before	2
Seats won	1
Seats after	3
Seat change	▲1
Popular vote	8,411
Percentage	12.6%
Swing	▲6.0%
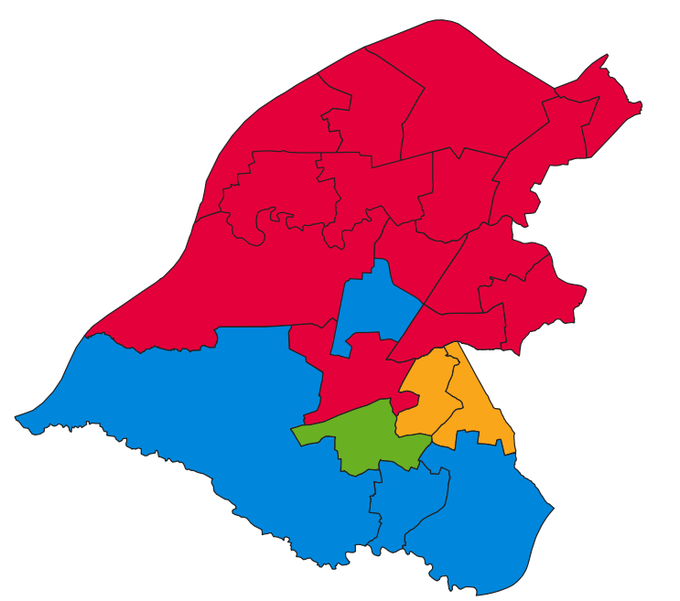
- Map of results of 2019 election
Leader of the Council before election
Andrew Western
Labour
Leader of the Council after election
Andrew Western
Labour

The 2019 Trafford Metropolitan Borough Council election to elect members of Trafford Metropolitan Borough Council in England took place on 2 May 2019. This was on the same day as other local elections.

One third of the council stood for election, with each successful candidate serving a four-year term of office, expiring in 2023. Prior to the election the council had been in a state of no overall control, with the Labour Party running a minority administration through a confidence and supply arrangement with The Liberal Democrats. In the election the Labour Party gained six seats and was therefore capable of forming a majority administration thereafter.

== Election result ==
Party	Votes		Seats			Full Council	
Labour Party	27,488 (41.3%)	▼5.9	14 (66.7%)	14 / 21	▲6	36 (57.1%)	36 / 63
Conservative Party	19,573 (29.4%)	▼7.4	4 (19.0%)	4 / 21	▼9	20 (31.7%)	20 / 63
Liberal Democrats	7,072 (10.6%)	▲3.3	2 (9.5%)	2 / 21	▲2	4 (6.3%)	4 / 63
Green Party	8,411 (12.6%)	▲6.0	1 (4.8%)	1 / 21	▲1	3 (4.8%)	3 / 63
UKIP	3,472 (5.2%)	▲3.8	0 (0.0%)	0 / 21	Steady	0 (0.0%)	0 / 63
Liberal Party	367 (0.6%)	▲0.1	0 (0.0%)	0 / 21	Steady	0 (0.0%)	0 / 63
Independent	251 (0.4%)	▲0.2	0 (0.0%)	0 / 21	Steady	0 (0.0%)	0 / 63

↓
36	3	4	20

== Ward results ==
=== Altrincham ward ===
Altrincham
Party	Candidate	Votes	%	±%
Green	Michael Welton	2,377	61.3	▲14.2
Conservative	Angela Stone	1,057	27.3	▼5.2
Labour	Ged Carter	313	8.1	▼12.4
Liberal Democrats	David Martin	128	3.3	▲1.0
Majority		1,320	34.1	N/A
Registered electors		8,867		
Turnout		3,875	43.96	▼3.14
Green gain from Conservative		Swing	▲10.5	

=== Ashton upon Mersey ward ===
Ashton upon Mersey
Party	Candidate	Votes	%	±%
Labour	Ben Hartley	1,535	42.9	▼0.9
Conservative	Mike Whetton*	1,398	39.1	▼7.7
Green	Caroline Robertson-Brown	273	7.6	▲3.5
Liberal Democrats	Martin Elliott	247	6.9	▲3.0
UKIP	Brian Johnson	127	3.5	▲2.0
Majority		137	3.83	▼9.7
Registered electors		7,500		
Turnout		3,580	47.84	▲0.74
Labour gain from Conservative		Swing	▲3.4	

=== Bowdon ward ===
Bowdon
Party	Candidate	Votes	%	±%
Conservative	Claire Churchill	1,727	59.5	▼8.9
Liberal Democrats	Ludo Tolhurst-Cleaver	411	14.2	▲2.8
Green	Deborah Leftwich	411	14.2	▲8.8
Labour	Thomas Hague	351	12.2	▼1.4
Majority		1,316	45.4	▼9.5
Registered electors		7,171		
Turnout		2,900	40.4	▼2.1
Conservative hold		Swing	▼5.9	

=== Broadheath ward ===
Broadheath
Party	Candidate	Votes	%	±%
Labour	Serena Carr	1,904	47.3	▼2.0
Conservative	Shengke Zhi	1,219	30.3	▼10.4
Green	Daniel Gresty	346	8.6	▲4.8
UKIP	Norine Napier	255	6.3	▲5.0
Liberal Democrats	Christopher Marritt	219	5.4	▲1.4
Independent	Stephen Farndon	87	2.1	▲1.3
Majority		685	16.9	▲8.3
Registered electors		9,960		
Turnout		4,030	40.64	▼2
Labour gain from Conservative		Swing	▲4.2	

=== Brooklands ward ===
Brooklands
Party	Candidate	Votes	%	±%
Labour	Rose Thompson	1,587	43.3	▼4.0
Conservative	Michelle McGrath	1,295	35.3	▼7.8
Green	Joe Ryan	309	8.4	▲5.0
Liberal Democrats	Pauline Cliff	298	8.1	▲3.9
UKIP	Tony Nayler	174	4.7	▲3.3
Majority		292	3.4	▼3.4
Registered electors		7,735		
Turnout		3,663	47.6	▼4.4
Labour gain from Conservative		Swing	▲1.9	

=== Bucklow-St. Martins ward ===
Bucklow-St. Martins
Party	Candidate	Votes	%	±%
Labour	Aidan Williams*	988	54.6	▼15.9
Conservative	Lyall Ainscow	327	18.0	▼3.0
UKIP	Andrew Beaumont	283	15.6	▲11.2
Green	Rodrigo Capucho Paulo	134	7.4	▲5.2
Liberal Democrats	Stephen Power	76	4.2	▲2.3
Majority		661	36.6	▼13.0
Registered electors		7,060		
Turnout		1,808	25.84	▼2.66
Labour hold		Swing	▼6.5	

=== Clifford ward ===
Clifford
Party	Candidate	Votes	%	±%
Labour	Akilah Akinola	2,375	79.1	▼5.2
Green	Jess Mayo	378	12.6	▲4.6
Conservative	Alex Finney	155	5.2	▲0.1
Liberal Democrats	Dave Nicholson	93	3.0	▲0.4
Majority		1,997	66.5	▼9.9
Registered electors		8,351		
Turnout		3,001	36.07	▼3.23
Labour hold		Swing	▼4.9	

=== Davyhulme East ward ===
Davyhulme East
Party	Candidate	Votes	%	±%
Labour	Barry Winstanley	1,929	60.9	▲3.4
Conservative	Daniel Kupusarevic	695	21.9	▼14.3
UKIP	Gary Regan	253	7.9	▲6.1
Green	Steven Tennant-Smythe	184	5.8	▲3.2
Liberal Democrats	Dawn Carberry-Power	102	3.2	▲1.3
Majority		1,234	39.0	▲17.7
Registered electors		7,700		
Turnout		3,163	41.26	▼8.2
Labour gain from Conservative		Swing	▲8.9	

=== Davyhulme West ward ===
Davyhulme West
Party	Candidate	Votes	%	±%
Labour	Karina Carter	1,704	53.5	▼4.0
Conservative	Lisa Cooke	965	30.3	▼5.9
UKIP	Paul Regan	279	8.7	▲5.1
Green	Ram Nachiappan	150	4.7	▲2.8
Liberal Democrats	Ged Zuk	86	2.7	▲0.5
Majority		739	23.2	▲6.2
Registered electors		7,650		
Turnout		3,184	41.62	▼8.88
Labour gain from Conservative		Swing	▲1.0	

=== Flixton ward ===
Flixton
Party	Candidate	Votes	%	±%
Labour	Shirley Procter	2,203	58.4	▼1.5
Conservative	Jonathan Coupe*	915	24.2	▼9.3
UKIP	James Cook	287	7.6	▲5.6
Green	Tim Woodward	217	5.7	▲3.0
Liberal Democrats	Ian Sutherland	152	4.0	▲2.2
Majority		1,288	34.2	▲7.8
Registered electors		8,322		
Turnout		3,774	45.51	▼9.49
Labour gain from Conservative		Swing	▲3.9	

=== Gorse Hill ward ===
Gorse Hill
Party	Candidate	Votes	%	±%
Labour	Mike Cordingley*	1,703	65.3	▼7.7
Conservative	Gareth Parker	310	11.9	▼5.5
Green	Jennie Wadsworth	252	9.6	▲5.5
UKIP	Seamus Martin	212	8.1	▲5.7
Liberal Democrats	Adam Dean	129	4.9	▲1.7
Majority		1,393	53.4	▼2.2
Registered electors		8,391		
Turnout		2,606	31.22	▼2.3
Labour hold		Swing	▼1.1	

=== Hale Barns ward ===
Hale Barns
Party	Candidate	Votes	%	±%
Conservative	Dave Morgan	1,613	57.5	▼9.4
Labour Co-op	Barbara Twiney	378	13.5	▼3.0
Liberal Democrats	Maggie Boysen	313	11.1	▲2.2
Green	Jessica Hession	196	6.9	▲3.6
Independent	Sandra Taylor	164	5.8	▲1.1
UKIP	Ian Royle	144	5.1	N/A
Majority		1,195	42.5	▼7.8
Registered electors		7,362		
Turnout		2,808	38.26	▼0.74
Conservative hold		Swing	▼3.2	

=== Hale Central ward ===
Hale Central
Party	Candidate	Votes	%	±%
Conservative	Patricia Young*	1,430	48.5	▼5.1
Liberal Democrats	Will Frass	555	18.8	▲6.6
Green	Stephen Leicester	512	17.4	▲11.9
Labour	Benjamin Slater	447	17.4	▼9.6
Majority		875	29.7	▲3.1
Registered electors		7,388		
Turnout		2,944	40.21	▼0.1
Conservative hold		Swing	▼5.9	

=== Longford ward ===
Longford
Party	Candidate	Votes	%	±%
Labour	Anne Duffield*	2,150	66.9	▼4.6
Green	Margaret Westbrook	406	12.6	▲6.1
Conservative	Adam Miya	336	10.46	▼4.5
Liberal Democrats	Anna Fryer	318	9.9	▲6.9
Majority		1,744	54.3	▼2.2
Registered electors		9,098		
Turnout		3,210	35.63	▼4.47
Labour hold		Swing	▼5.4	

=== Priory ward ===
Priory
Party	Candidate	Votes	%	±%
Labour	Andrew Western*	1,511	48.8	▼11.5
Conservative	Louis Marks	679	21.9	▼7.6
Green	Nicholas Robertson-Brown	404	13.0	▲7.9
Liberal Democrats	Briony Stephenson	305	9.8	▲4.7
UKIP	Kevin Grime	199	6.4	N/A
Majority		832	26.85	▼3.95
Registered electors		8,052		
Turnout		3,098	38.61	▼2.29
Labour hold		Swing	▼2.0	

=== Sale Moor ward ===
Sale Moor
Party	Candidate	Votes	%	±%
Labour Co-op	Joanne Bennett*	1,347	52.4	▲0.7
Conservative	Matt Leigh	664	25.9	▼9.1
Green	Jane Leicester	355	13.8	▲8
Liberal Democrats	Simon Wright	203	7.9	▲0.4
Majority		683	26.6	▲9.9
Registered electors		7,549		
Turnout		2,569	34.03	▼2.37
Labour hold		Swing	▲4.9	

=== St. Mary's ward ===
St Mary's
Party	Candidate	Votes	%	±%
Conservative	Dan Bunting*	1,527	49.1	▼10.9
Labour	Jill Axford	920	29.6	▼1.2
Green	James McGlashan	294	9.4	▲5
Liberal Democrats	Alison Smith	188	6.0	▲1.1
UKIP	Kathy Mason	184	5.9	N/A
Majority		607	19.5	▼9.7
Registered electors		8,611		
Turnout		3,113	36.15	▼3.75
Conservative hold		Swing	▼4.9	

=== Stretford ward ===
Stretford
Party	Candidate	Votes	%	±%
Labour	Stephen Adshead*	1,843	66.0	▼5.5
Conservative	Kwok Leung	329	11.8	▼3.9
Green	Liz O'Neill	304	10.9	▲4.1
UKIP	Barbara McDermott	208	7.5	▲4.6
Liberal Democrats	Simon Lepori	107	3.8	▲0.7
Majority		1,514	54.2	▼1.6
Registered electors		7,843		
Turnout		2,791	35.6	▼3.9
Labour hold		Swing	▼0.8	

=== Timperley ward ===
Timperley
Party	Candidate	Votes	%	±%
Liberal Democrats	Meena Minnis	1,653	42.4	▲10.7
Conservative	Angela Bruer-Morris*	1,266	32.5	▼7.9
Green	Jadwiga Leigh	423	10.9	▲8.2
Liberal	Neil Taylor	367	9.4	▲1.2
UKIP	Pauline Royle	187	4.8	N/A
Majority		387	9.9	▲1.2
Registered electors		8,410		
Turnout		3,896	46.33	▼3.3
Liberal Democrats gain from Conservative		Swing	▲9.3	

=== Urmston ward ===
Urmston
Party	Candidate	Votes	%	±%
Labour Co-op	Jo Harding*	1,844	54.6	▼3.2
Conservative	John Lijo	724	21.4	▼9.9
UKIP	Krissy Douglas	340	10.1	▲6.5
Green	Luciya Whyte	290	8.6	▲4.0
Liberal Democrats	Shaun Ennis	179	5.3	▲2.0
Majority		1,120	33.2	▲6.8
Registered electors		8,472		
Turnout		3,394	40.06	▼5.24
Labour hold		Swing	▲3.4	

=== Village ward ===
Village
Party	Candidate	Votes	%	±%
Liberal Democrats	Julian Newgrosh	1,310	41.0	▲10.2
Conservative	Darren Meacher	942	29.4	▼11.4
Labour	Waseem Hassan	456	14.3	▼8.5
UKIP	Angela O'Neill	295	9.2	▲5.9
Green	Robert Raikes	196	6.1	▲3.7
Majority		368	11.50	▲1.4
Registered electors		7,905		
Turnout		3,199	40.47	▼0.73
Liberal Democrats gain from Conservative		Swing	▲10.8	
