= Andrew Western =

British politician (born 1985)

Andrew Western MP
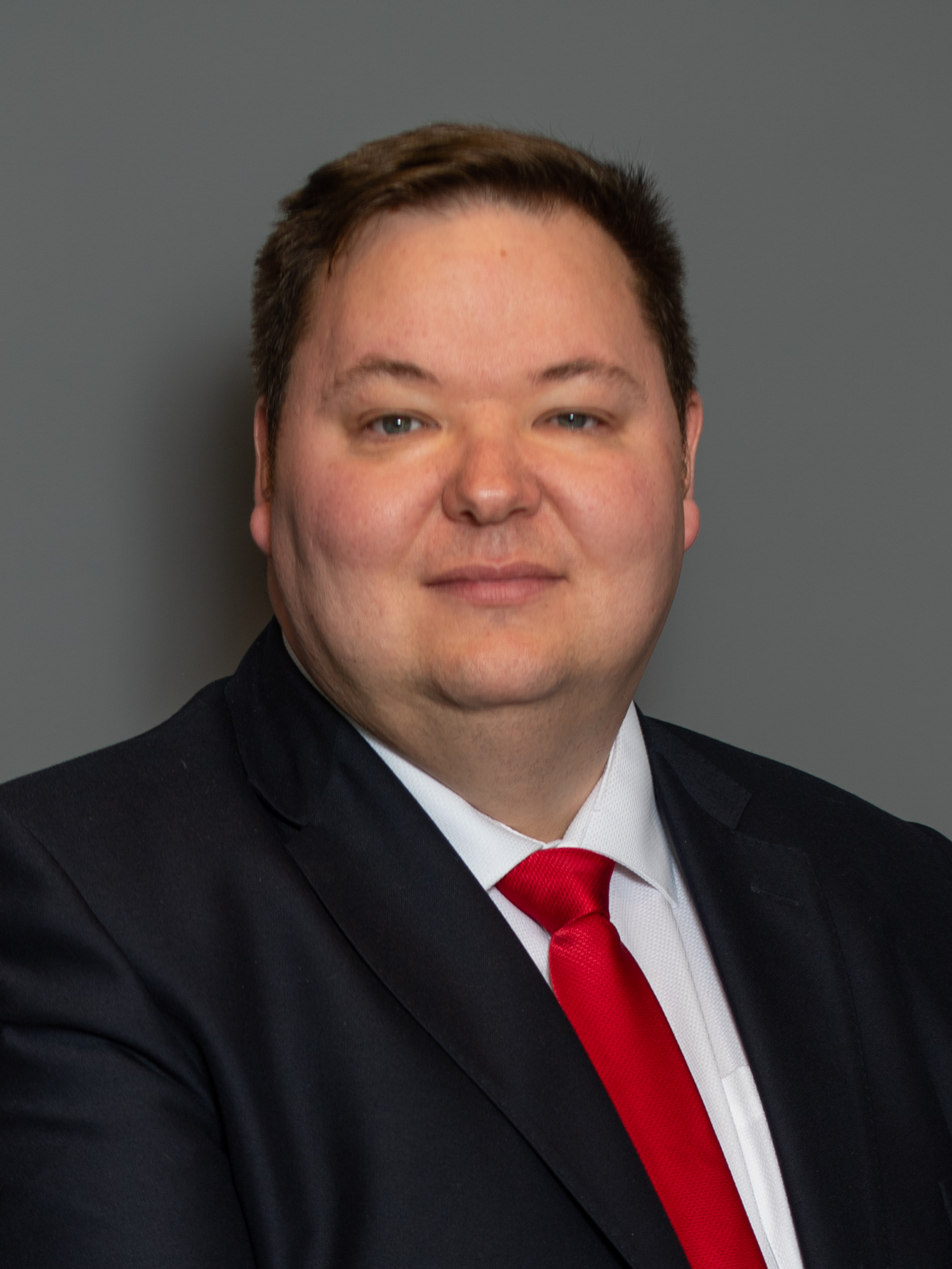
- Official portrait, 2022

Minister of State for Employment
- Incumbent
- Assumed office 21 July 2026
- Prime Minister: Andy Burnham
- Preceded by: Diana Johnson

Parliamentary Under-Secretary of State for Transformation
- In office 9 July 2024 – 21 July 2026
- Prime Minister: Keir Starmer
- Preceded by: Office established
- Succeeded by: Lillian Greenwood

Member of Parliament for Stretford and Urmston
- Incumbent
- Assumed office 15 December 2022
- Preceded by: Kate Green
- Majority: 16,150 (35.1%)

Leader of Trafford Council
- In office 23 May 2018 – 17 December 2022
- Preceded by: Sean Anstee
- Succeeded by: Tom Ross

Member of Trafford Council for Priory
- In office 5 May 2011 – 4 May 2023
- Preceded by: Roland Griffin

Personal details
- Born: Andrew Howard Western; 18 March 1985 (age 41) Wythenshawe, Manchester, England
- Party: Labour
- Education: University of Sheffield (BA)
- Website: andrewwestern.co.uk

Andrew Howard Western (born 18 March 1985) is a British politician who has served as Minister of State for Employment since 2026. A member of the Labour Party, he has been the Member of Parliament (MP) for Stretford and Urmston since 2022.

Prior to his election to Parliament, Western served as Leader of Trafford Council from 2018 to 2022.

== Early life ==
Andrew Howard Western was born at Wythenshawe Hospital, and grew up in Timperley, Trafford.

His mother Denise Western (née Firth) served as a Labour councillor on Trafford Council for Broadheath Ward until her death in 2025.

Western attended Altrincham Grammar School for Boys, before studying History and Politics at Sheffield University, graduating in 2006. He returned to Trafford after university, and before becoming council leader worked in project management within the engineering sector, focusing particularly on transport infrastructure. Western lives in Urmston.

== Politics ==
=== Local government ===
Western joined the Labour Party in 2006, holding various roles at a branch and constituency level over the following 10 years.

He was first elected to Trafford Council at the 2011 local elections, representing Priory ward, which largely consists of Sale town centre.

Western was subsequently re-elected at both the 2015 and 2019 local government elections.

Western became Deputy Leader of the Labour Group on Trafford Council in May 2014, before becoming Labour Group Leader, and Leader of the Opposition, in November 2014.

At the 2018 local government elections , the Labour Party gained four seats from the Conservative Party, with the Tories suffering further losses to the Liberal Democrats and the Greens.

The Labour Party became the largest political group on Trafford Council, with the previously Tory-controlled authority being placed in a state of no overall control; Labour formed a minority-control administration governing the Council with the support of the Liberal Democrats in a confidence and supply arrangement. Western was confirmed as Council Leader shortly after the elections.

At the 2019 local government elections, the Labour Party made further gains in Trafford, securing an additional six seats from the Conservative Party. The Labour Group obtained a majority of council seats, and formed an outright administration governing the Council. This was the first time since the 2004 boundary changes that Labour had managed to win a majority of seats.

As Council Leader, Western sat on the Greater Manchester Combined Authority and prior to his election to Parliament was the Portfolio Lead for Place Based Regeneration (Housing and Infrastructure) as well as Clean Air. Between May 2018 and May 2019, he served as Portfolio Lead for Digital. He led on Green City Region between 2019 and 2021, before leading on Digital, Works and Skills for the second half of that year. He sat on the Transport for the North Board, the Greater Manchester Transport Committee and the North West Regional Leaders Board.

In March 2019, Western publicly opposed the plans by Mayor of Greater Manchester Andy Burnham to make cuts to Greater Manchester Fire and Rescue Service.

Western was an active member of the Local Government Association, and as Chair of the LGA's Resources (Finance) Board was cross-party lead on finance in local government. He also represented Labour councillors in North West England as the LGA Labour Group rep for the Region. In June 2022, Western became Chair of the GM Transport Committee, a committee of councillors overseeing public transport in the City Region.

From July 2019 until March 2023, Western served as a non-executive director at Trafford Housing Trust. He was as a school governor at Wellfield Infant and Nursery School in Sale for over 15 years.

Following his election to parliament in December 2022, Western resigned as leader of Trafford Council, being succeeded by Tom Ross.

=== Parliament ===
Western had twice sought election to Parliament before being elected, being the Labour candidate in Altrincham and Sale West at the 2017 and 2019 general elections. On both occasions, he retained the party's second place, but was defeated by incumbent MP Sir Graham Brady. The previously safe Conservative seat, had, however, become marginal. In 2019, he and Brady both lost ground to the Liberal Democrats and Greens.

On 26 June 2022, Western was selected to contest Stretford and Urmston after the upcoming retirement of incumbent Labour MP Kate Green at the next general election; Green resigned in November 2022, triggering a by-election, at which Western was the successful Labour candidate. He won the by-election with 69.6% of the vote.

In the Labour reshuffle of September 2023, Western was promoted to the Opposition Whip's Office. Following the 2024 General Election Western was appointed Parliamentary Under Secretary of State at the Department for Work and Pensions as the Minister for Transformation. In the 2024 general election Western retained his seat. On 21 July 2026, he was appointed Minister of State for Employment under Andy Burnham.

== Political views ==
Western supported Yvette Cooper in the 2015 Labour leadership election. In the 2020 leadership election, he supported Lisa Nandy for Leader, backing Angela Rayner in the deputy leadership contest.

Western endorsed Tony Lloyd in the 2016 Greater Manchester Labour Party mayoral selection.

In a speech to Stand Up to Racism Manchester, Western claimed to have "chased (Tommy Robinson) out of Trafford", and expressed his concern about Donald Trump and Boris Johnson, describing the latter as "far right".

He is a member of the Fabian Society.

== Electoral history ==
UK Parliamentary Elections
Year	Constituency	Party	Votes	% of votes	Result
2024	Stretford and Urmston	Labour	22,642	49.2	Elected
2022 by-election	Stretford and Urmston	Labour	12,828	69.6	Elected
2019	Altrincham and Sale West	Labour	20,172	36.8	Not Elected
2017	Altrincham and Sale West	Labour	20,507	38.8	Not Elected

UK Local Elections
Year	Borough	Ward	Party	Votes	% of votes	Result
2019	Trafford	Priory	Labour	1,511	48.8	Elected
2015	Trafford	Priory	Labour	2,407	42.9	Elected
2011	Trafford	Priory	Labour	1,510	43.3	Elected
2010	Trafford	Broadheath	Labour	1,799	29.3	Not Elected
2008	Trafford	Broadheath	Labour	836	26.9	Not Elected
2007	Trafford	Hale Barns	Labour	284	9.1	Not Elected

== Personal life ==
Western lived with his mother until his early 30s, which he has said spurred his interesting in housing policy and the Yimby movement.

Parliament of the United Kingdom
Preceded by Kate Green	Member of Parliament for Stretford and Urmston; 2022–present	Incumbent
Political offices
Preceded by Sean Anstee	Leader of Trafford Council; 2018–2022	Succeeded by Tom Ross
