= 2015 Trafford Metropolitan Borough Council election =

2015 local election in England

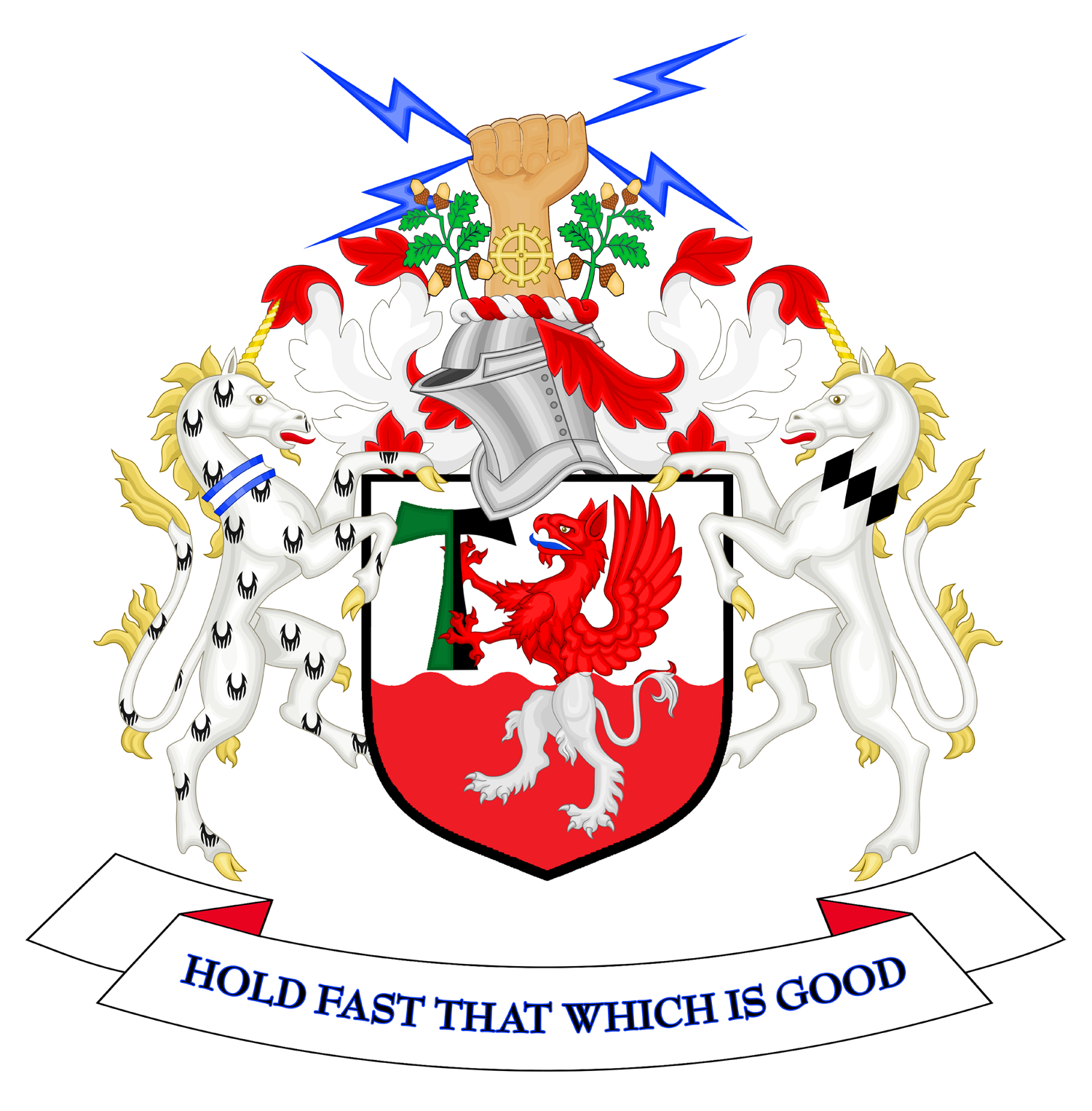
- 7 May 2015

21 of 63 seats to Trafford Metropolitan Borough Council 32 seats needed for a majority
	First party	Second party	Third party
Leader	Sean Anstee	Andrew Western	Ray Bowker
Party	Conservative	Labour	Liberal Democrats
Leader's seat	Bowdon	Priory	Village
Last election	12 seats, 39.4%	9 seats, 37.6%	1 seats, 7.9%
Seats before	33	27	3
Seats won	13	8	0
Seats after	34	26	3
Seat change	▲1	▼1	Steady
Popular vote	49,901	45,352	7,838
Percentage	44.0%	40.0%	6.9%
Swing	▲4.6%	▲2.4%	▼1.0%
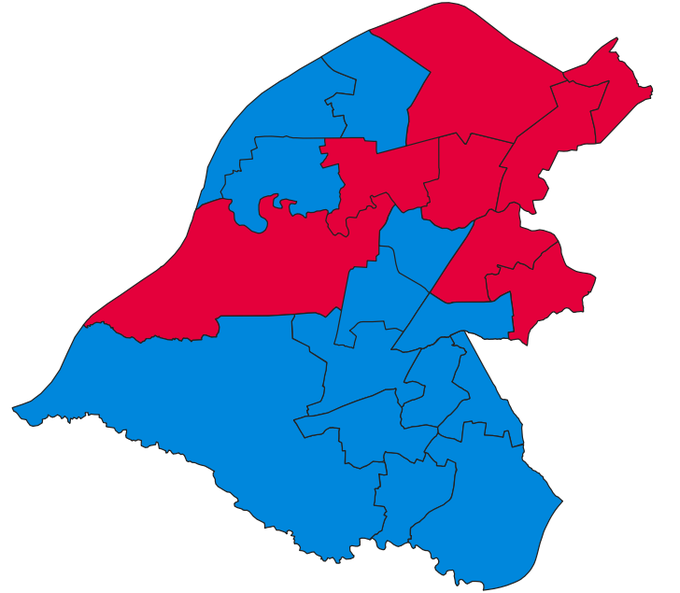
- Map of results of 2015 election
Leader of the Council before election
Sean Anstee
Conservative
Leader of the Council after election
Sean Anstee
Conservative

The 2015 Trafford Metropolitan Borough Council election was scheduled to take place on 7 May 2015 to elect members of Trafford Metropolitan Borough Council in England. This was on the same day as other local elections. One third of the council was up for election, with each successful candidate serving a four-year term of office, expiring in 2019. The Conservative Party held overall control of the council.

== Election result ==
Party	Votes		Seats			Full Council	
Conservative Party	26,427 (44.0%)	▲4.6	13 (61.9%)	13 / 21	▲1	34 (54.0%)	34 / 63
Labour Party	45,352 (40.0%)	▲2.4	8 (38.1%)	8 / 21	▼1	26 (41.3%)	26 / 63
Liberal Democrats	7,838 (6.9%)	▼1.0	0 (0.0%)	0 / 21	Steady	3 (4.8%)	3 / 63
Green Party	9,207 (8.1%)	▼1.3	0 (0.0%)	0 / 21	Steady	0 (0.0%)	0 / 63
UKIP	1,202 (1.1%)	▼4.6	0 (0.0%)	0 / 21	Steady	0 (0.0%)	0 / 63

↓
26	3	34

== Ward results ==
=== Altrincham ward ===
Altrincham
Party	Candidate	Votes	%	±%
Conservative	Michael Young*	3,102	53.5	+3.2
Labour	Waseem Hassan	1,390	24.0	−5.9
Green	Daniel Jerrome	694	12.0	+4.1
Liberal Democrats	Richard Elliott	612	10.6	−1.3
Majority		1,712	29.5	+13.5
Turnout		5,798	66.8	+24.3
Conservative hold		Swing		

=== Ashton upon Mersey ward ===
Ashton upon Mersey
Party	Candidate	Votes	%	±%
Conservative	Mike Whetton*	2,759	51.4	+0.9
Labour	Ben Hartley	1,815	33.8	+4.4
Green	Caroline Robertson-Brown	478	8.9	−5.5
Liberal Democrats	Chris Marritt	320	6.0	+0.4
Majority		944	17.4	−3.7
Turnout		5,372	73.1	+26.8
Conservative hold		Swing		

=== Bowdon ward ===
Bowdon
Party	Candidate	Votes	%	±%
Conservative	Michael Hyman*	3,700	70.6	+1.1
Labour	Tom Hague	773	14.7	+3.5
Green	Nicholas Davies	398	7.6	−1.7
Liberal Democrats	Elizabeth Hogg	370	7.1	+0.4
Majority		2,927	55.8	+1.1
Turnout		5,241	72.0	+23.4
Conservative hold		Swing		

=== Broadheath ward ===
Broadheath
Party	Candidate	Votes	%	±%
Conservative	Stephen Anstee	3,274	49.0	+11.6
Labour	Aidan Williams	2,659	39.8	−3.6
Liberal Democrats	Pauline Cliff	489	7.3	+3.3
Green	David Eatock	254	3.8	−1.1
Majority		615	8.2	+5.4
Turnout		6,676	69.0	+23.1
Conservative gain from Labour		Swing		

=== Brooklands ward ===
Brooklands
Party	Candidate	Votes	%	±%
Conservative	David Hopps	2,952	52.1	+0.3
Labour	Gary Keary	1,868	32.9	−0.6
Liberal Democrats	James Eisen	472	8.3	−0.8
Green	Joseph Ryan	378	6.7	+0.3
Majority		1,084	19.2	+1.1
Turnout		5,670	71.8	+24.1
Conservative hold		Swing		

=== Bucklow-St. Martins ward ===
Bucklow-St. Martins
Party	Candidate	Votes	%	±%
Labour	John Smith*	2,441	62.9	−0.4
Conservative	Neil Ferguson	1,082	27.9	+3.4
Green	Daniel Wadsworth	357	9.2	+2.4
Majority		1,359	35.0	−3.9
Turnout		3,880	57.2	+25.6
Labour hold		Swing		

=== Clifford ward ===
Clifford
Party	Candidate	Votes	%	±%
Labour	Ejaz Malik*	3,504	72.2	−4.0
Green	Jess Mayo	877	18.1	+6.4
Conservative	Chacko Luke	471	9.7	+1.6
Majority		2,627	54.1	−10.4
Turnout		4,852	64.4	+24.8
Labour hold		Swing		

=== Davyhulme East ward ===
Davyhulme East
Party	Candidate	Votes	%	±%
Conservative	Mark Cawdrey	2,218	42.5	+0.3
Labour	Anna Booth	2,160	41.4	+8.7
UKIP	Stephen Farndon	581	11.1	−6.0
Green	Steven Tennant-Smythe	254	4.9	+0.4
Majority		58	1.1	−8.4
Turnout		5,213	69.1	+24.4
Conservative hold		Swing		

=== Davyhulme West ward ===
Davyhulme West
Party	Candidate	Votes	%	±%
Conservative	John Reilly*	2,701	50.9	+11.1
Labour	Jayne Dillon	2,195	41.3	+4.2
Green	Aleesha Coupland	413	7.8	+4.3
Majority		506	9.5	+6.9
Turnout		5,309	70.1	+27.2
Conservative hold		Swing		

=== Flixton ward ===
Flixton
Party	Candidate	Votes	%	±%
Conservative	Jonathan Coupe*	2,753	46.1	+7.5
Labour	Ged Carter	2,586	43.3	+5.8
Green	Alison Cavanagh	440	7.4	+2.4
Liberal Democrats	Wayne Harrison	197	3.3	+1.0
Majority		167	2.8	+1.7
Turnout		5,976	72.6	+28.8
Conservative hold		Swing		

=== Gorse Hill ward ===
Gorse Hill
Party	Candidate	Votes	%	±%
Labour	Mike Cordingley*	3,078	63.4	−4.4
Conservative	Lijo John	1,225	25.2	+5.7
Green	Nigel Woodcock	551	11.4	+3.9
Majority		1,853	38.2	−10.0
Turnout		4,854	62.7	+29.8
Labour hold		Swing		

=== Hale Barns ward ===
Hale Barns
Party	Candidate	Votes	%	±%
Conservative	Bernard Sharp*	3,499	67.8	+3.6
Labour Co-op	Barbara Twiney	851	16.5	+3.2
Liberal Democrats	Sandra Taylor	484	9.4	+2.6
Green	Rozina Chaudry	325	6.3	+1.8
Majority		2,648	51.3	+0.4
Turnout		5,159	70.6	+23.8
Conservative hold		Swing		

=== Hale Central ward ===
Hale Central
Party	Candidate	Votes	%	±%
Conservative	Patricia Young*	3,394	62.1	+3.1
Labour Co-op	Beverley Harrison	1,126	20.6	−1.1
Green	Samuel Little	482	8.8	−0.7
Liberal Democrats	Kirsty Cullen	463	8.5	−1.3
Majority		2,268	41.5	+4.2
Turnout		5,465	73.5	+27.6
Conservative hold		Swing		

=== Longford ward ===
Longford
Party	Candidate	Votes	%	±%
Labour	Anne Duffield*	3,763	64.8	+1.8
Conservative	Edward Kelson	1,212	20.9	−0.2
Green	Margaret Westbrook	831	14.3	+3.1
Majority		2,551	43.9	+2.0
Turnout		5,806	66.8	+26.9
Labour hold		Swing		

=== Priory ward ===
Priory
Party	Candidate	Votes	%	±%
Labour	Andrew Western*	2,407	42.9	−10.8
Conservative	Michael Taylor	2,200	39.4	+10.8
Green	Mark Hamer	595	10.6	−0.1
Liberal Democrats	Michael Macdonald	392	7.0	+0.0
Majority		208	3.6	−21.5
Turnout		5,594	70.5	+31.0
Labour hold		Swing		

=== Sale Moor ward ===
Sale Moor
Party	Candidate	Votes	%	±%
Labour	Joanne Bennett*	2,512	50.7	+5.6
Conservative	Tony Field	1,939	39.2	+10.6
Green	Paul Bayliss	499	10.1	+2.6
Majority		573	11.5	−4.0
Turnout		4,950	66.1	+29.5
Labour hold		Swing		

=== St. Mary's ward ===
St. Mary's
Party	Candidate	Votes	%	±%
Conservative	Dan Bunting*	2,911	53.4	+6.7
Labour	Michael Melia	1,880	34.5	−0.3
Green	Jane Leicester	381	7.0	+3.1
Liberal Democrats	David Martin	283	5.2	+2.2
Majority		1,031	18.9	+7.0
Turnout		5,455	65.9	+25.9
Conservative hold		Swing		

=== Stretford ward ===
Stretford
Party	Candidate	Votes	%	±%
Labour	Stephen Adshead*	3,084	60.0	−1.2
Conservative	Colin Hooley	1,207	23.5	−0.9
Green	Liz O'Neill	649	12.6	+3.1
Liberal Democrats	Craig Thomas	203	3.9	−1.0
Majority		1,877	36.5	−0.3
Turnout		5,143	66.5	+26.2
Labour hold		Swing		

=== Timperley ward ===
Timperley
Party	Candidate	Votes	%	±%
Conservative	Angela Bruer-Morris*	2,911	46.2	+7.4
Liberal Democrats	William Jones	1,827	29.0	−8.3
Labour	Mal Choudhury	1,189	18.9	+1.9
Green	Jad Leigh	368	5.8	−1.1
Majority		1,084	17.2	+15.7
Turnout		6,295	74.9	+24.3
Conservative hold		Swing		

=== Urmston ward ===
Urmston
Party	Candidate	Votes	%	±%
Labour	Joanne Harding*	2,506	43.6	+4.5
Conservative	Christine Turner	2,146	37.3	+2.7
UKIP	Andrew Beaumont	621	10.8	−7.1
Green	Paul Syrett	318	5.5	−0.8
Liberal Democrats	Kirstie Davidson	162	2.8	+0.8
Majority		360	6.3	+1.8
Turnout		5,753	70.6	+24.6
Labour hold		Swing		

=== Village ward ===
Village
Party	Candidate	Votes	%	±%
Conservative	Laura Evans*	2,246	43.2	+8.1
Labour	Tony O'Brien	1,564	30.1	+3.9
Liberal Democrats	Julian Newgrosh	1,112	21.4	−12.0
Green	Jennie Wadsworth	276	5.3	0
Majority		682	13.1	+11.3
Turnout		5,198	67.6	+23.5
Conservative hold		Swing		
