= 2010 Trafford Metropolitan Borough Council election =

2010 UK local government election

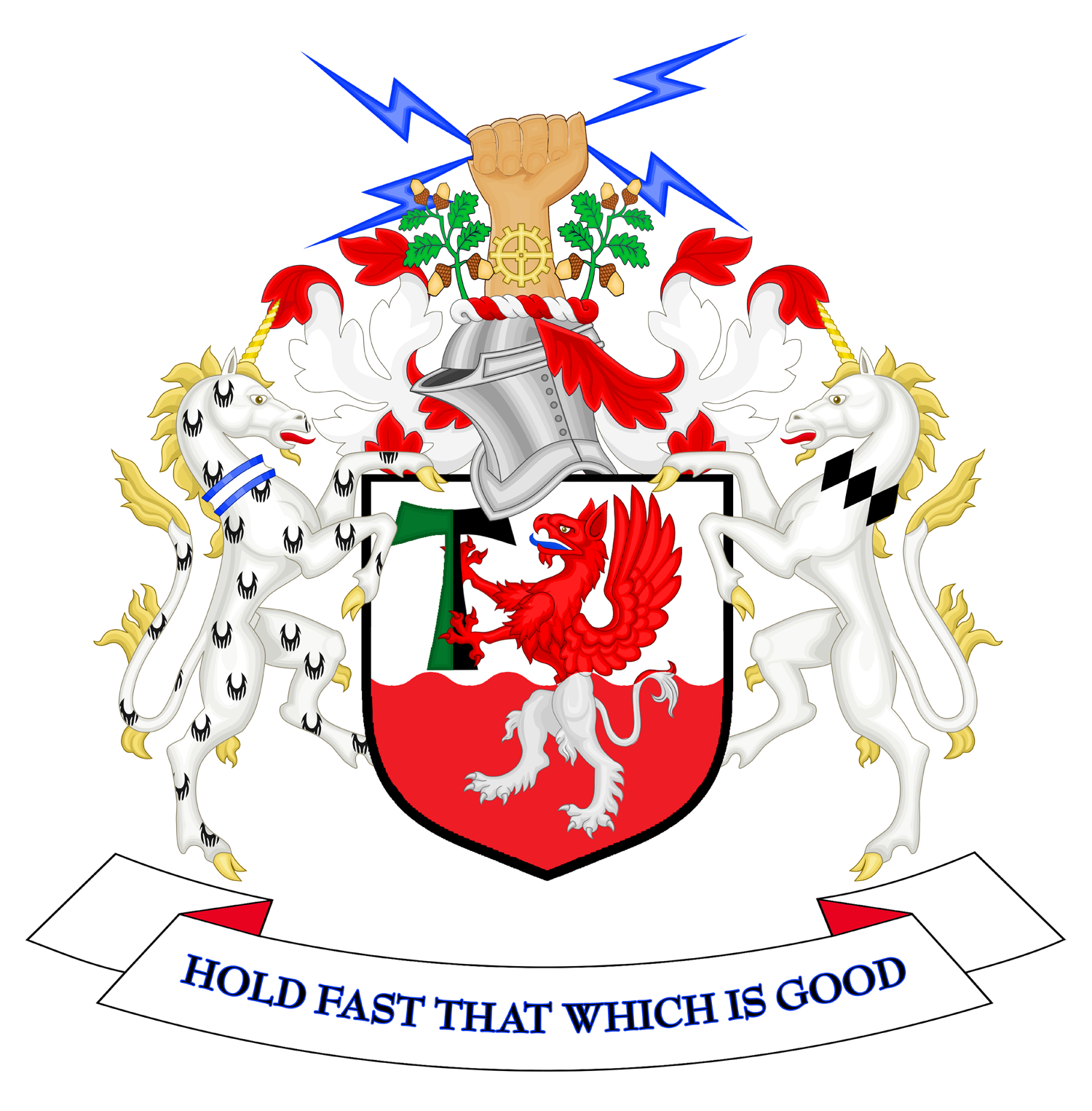
- 6 May 2010

22 of 63 seats to Trafford Metropolitan Borough Council 32 seats needed for a majority
	First party	Second party	Third party
Leader	Matt Colledge	David Acton	Ray Bowker
Party	Conservative	Labour	Liberal Democrats
Leader's seat	Timperley	Gorse Hill	Village
Last election	13 seats, 47.3%	7 seats, 27.6%	2 seats, 16.9%
Seats before	39	19	5
Seats won	12	8	2
Seats after	37	21	5
Seat change	▼2	▲2	Steady
Popular vote	46,332	36,372	26,136
Percentage	40.3%	31.7%	22.8%
Swing	▼7.0%	▲4.1%	▲5.9%
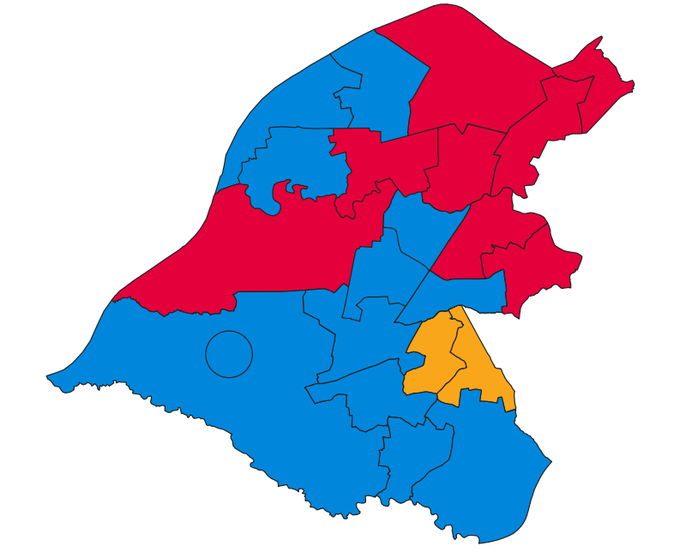
- Map of results of 2010 election
Leader of the Council before election
Matt Colledge
Conservative
Leader of the Council after election
Matt Colledge
Conservative

Elections to Trafford Council were held on 6 May 2010. One-third of the council was up for election, with each successful candidate to serve a four-year term of office, expiring in 2014. The Conservative Party held overall control of the council.

== Election result ==
Party	Votes		Seats			Full Council	
Conservative Party	46,332 (40.3%)	▼7.0	12 (54.5%)	12 / 22	▼2	37 (58.7%)	37 / 63
Labour Party	36,382 (31.7%)	▲4.1	8 (36.4%)	8 / 22	▲2	21 (33.3%)	21 / 63
Liberal Democrats	26,136 (22.8%)	▲5.9	2 (9.1%)	2 / 22	Steady	5 (7.9%)	5 / 63
Green Party	5,395 (4.7%)	▼2.7	0 (0.0%)	0 / 22	Steady	0 (0.0%)	0 / 63
UKIP	476 (0.4%)	Steady	0 (0.0%)	0 / 22	Steady	0 (0.0%)	0 / 63
English Democrats	168 (0.1%)	N/A	0 (0.0%)	0 / 22	N/A	0 (0.0%)	0 / 63

↓
21	5	37

== Ward results ==
=== Altrincham ward ===
Altrincham
Party	Candidate	Votes	%	±%
Conservative	Michael Young*	2,366	44.0	−9.6
Labour	Peter Baugh	1,404	26.1	+3.2
Liberal Democrats	Roger Legge	1,250	23.2	+8.1
Green	Deborah Leftwich	190	3.5	−4.9
English Democrat	Steve Mills	168	3.1	N/A
Majority		962	17.9	−12.8
Turnout		5378	64.5	+28.8
Conservative hold		Swing		

=== Ashton upon Mersey ward ===
Ashton upon Mersey
Party	Candidate	Votes	%	±%
Conservative	John Lamb*	2,325	44.5	−13.9
Labour	Michael Wilton	1,568	30.0	+4.1
Liberal Democrats	Terry Corbett	1,107	21.2	N/A
Green	Sara Ahsan	224	4.3	−11.4
Majority		757	14.5	−18.0
Turnout		5224	71.5	+32.1
Conservative hold		Swing		

=== Bowdon ward ===
Bowdon (2 vacancies)
Party	Candidate	Votes	%	±%
Conservative	Karen Barclay	3,304	34.2	−4.5
Conservative	Michael Hyman	3,000	31.1	
Liberal Democrats	Stuart Carter	924	9.6	+3.7
Liberal Democrats	James Eisen	682	7.1	
Labour	Thomas Hague	592	6.1	+1.9
Labour	Graham Crean	566	5.9	
Green	Bridget Green	329	3.4	−1.1
Green	Rosemary Graham	261	2.7	
Majority		2,076	43.0	−13.9
Turnout		9,658	70.4	+28.7
Conservative hold		Swing		
Conservative hold		Swing		

=== Broadheath ward ===
Broadheath
Party	Candidate	Votes	%	±%
Conservative	Jacki Wilkinson	2,569	41.9	−7.7
Labour	Andrew Western	1,799	29.3	+3.5
Liberal Democrats	Richard Wilson	1,519	24.8	+9.6
Green	Christine McLaughlin	247	4.0	−5.4
Majority		770	12.6	−11.2
Turnout		6,134	66.2	+30.4
Conservative hold		Swing		

=== Brooklands ward ===
Brooklands
Party	Candidate	Votes	%	±%
Conservative	Pam Dixon*	2,648	46.8	−12.7
Labour	Angela Gratrix	1,444	25.5	+8.7
Liberal Democrats	John O'Connor	1,389	24.5	+0.7
Green	Joseph Ryan	179	3.2	N/A
Majority		1,204	21.3	−14.4
Turnout		5,660	71.0	+32.1
Conservative hold		Swing		

=== Bucklow-St. Martins ward ===
Bucklow-St. Martins
Party	Candidate	Votes	%	±%
Labour	David Quayle*	1,972	51.2	−2.3
Conservative	Lisa Cooke	1,025	26.6	−4.4
Liberal Democrats	Graham Rogers	743	19.3	N/A
Green	Daniel Wadsworth	115	3.0	−12.5
Majority		947	24.6	+2.1
Turnout		3,855	53.5	+25.5
Labour hold		Swing		

=== Clifford ward ===
Clifford
Party	Candidate	Votes	%	±%
Labour	Sophie Taylor*	3,192	66.9	+2.9
Liberal Democrats	Simon Wright	840	17.6	N/A
Conservative	Lee Peck	395	8.3	−8.4
Green	Anne Power	343	7.2	−12.0
Majority		2,352	49.3	+4.5
Turnout		4,770	62.4	+30.5
Labour hold		Swing		

=== Davyhulme East ward ===
.

Davyhulme East
Party	Candidate	Votes	%	±%
Conservative	Mike Cornes*	2,232	43.3	−19.8
Labour	Helen Simpson	1,969	38.2	+1.3
Liberal Democrats	Pauline Cliff	801	15.5	N/A
Green	Jennie Wadsworth	157	3.0	N/A
Majority		263	5.1	−21.1
Turnout		5,159	66.5	+30.0
Conservative hold		Swing		

=== Davyhulme West ward ===
Davyhulme West
Party	Candidate	Votes	%	±%
Conservative	June Reilly*	2,678	55.0	−6.4
Liberal Democrats	Elizabeth Hogg	1,648	33.9	N/A
Green	Joe Westbrook	541	11.1	+0.8
Majority		1,030	21.2	−11.9
Turnout		4,867	64.7	+26.0
Conservative hold		Swing		

=== Flixton ward ===
Flixton
Party	Candidate	Votes	%	±%
Conservative	Viv Ward*	2,541	43.2	−10.2
Labour	Tom McDonald	2,214	37.6	+4.2
Liberal Democrats	Richard Elliott	915	15.5	N/A
Green	Paul Syrett	218	3.7	−9.5
Majority		327	5.6	−14.4
Turnout		5,888	70.8	+32.4
Conservative hold		Swing		

=== Gorse Hill ward ===
Gorse Hill
Party	Candidate	Votes	%	±%
Labour	David Acton*	2,721	58.6	+3.1
Conservative	Colin Levenston	913	19.6	−5.2
Liberal Democrats	Frank Beswick	801	17.2	N/A
Green	Philip Leape	212	4.6	−7.3
Majority		1,808	38.9	+8.2
Turnout		4,647	58.2	+30.9
Labour hold		Swing		

=== Hale Barns ward ===
Hale Barns
Party	Candidate	Votes	%	±%
Conservative	Dylan Butt*	3,279	61.5	−9.6
Liberal Democrats	Sandra Taylor	1,240	23.3	+4.7
Labour	Joyce Acton	663	12.4	+2.0
Green	Sarah McIlroy	150	2.8	N/A
Majority		2,039	38.2	−14.3
Turnout		5,332	69.7	+30.5
Conservative hold		Swing		

=== Hale Central ward ===
Hale Central
Party	Candidate	Votes	%	±%
Conservative	Alan Mitchell*	2,961	54.9	−6.1
Liberal Democrats	Julian Newgrosh	1,191	22.1	+6.6
Labour	Gwyneth Brock	915	17.0	+4.5
Green	Sam Little	328	6.1	−4.9
Majority		1,770	32.8	−12.7
Turnout		5,395	71.8	+33.2
Conservative hold		Swing		

=== Longford ward ===
Longford
Party	Candidate	Votes	%	±%
Labour	David Jarman*	2,908	53.5	+5.5
Conservative	Paul Lally	1,181	21.7	−10.5
Liberal Democrats	David Rhodes	881	16.2	N/A
Green	Margaret Westbrook	463	8.5	−5.8
Majority		1,727	31.8	+16.0
Turnout		5,433	62.5	+28.9
Labour hold		Swing		

=== Priory ward ===
Priory
Party	Candidate	Votes	%	±%
Labour	Jane Baugh*	2,087	39.3	+0.1
Conservative	James Callaghan	1,618	30.5	−2.7
Liberal Democrats	Will Jones	1,345	25.3	+7.5
Green	Emma Handley	263	5.0	−4.8
Majority		469	8.8	−2.8
Turnout		5,313	66.7	+27.4
Labour hold		Swing		

=== Sale Moor ward ===
Sale Moor
Party	Candidate	Votes	%	±%
Labour	Philip Gratrix	2,032	40.9	+1.8
Conservative	Christine Bailey*	1,668	33.6	−6.4
Liberal Democrats	Derek Hurst	1,068	21.5	+0.6
Green	Bridget Battye	198	4.0	N/A
Majority		364	7.3	
Turnout		4,966	65.2	+28.6
Labour gain from Conservative		Swing		

=== St. Mary's ward ===
St. Mary's
Party	Candidate	Votes	%	±%
Conservative	Rob Chilton	2,367	43.3	−8.9
Labour	Thomas Tomkins	1,619	29.6	+1.6
Liberal Democrats	Marjorie Rhodes	1,089	19.9	−1.0
UKIP	Stephen Farndon	223	4.1	N/A
Green	Zoe Power	165	3.0	−3.7
Majority		748	13.7	−10.5
Turnout		5,463	62.8	+26.0
Conservative hold		Swing		

=== Stretford ward ===
Stretford
Party	Candidate	Votes	%	±%
Labour	Dolores O'Sullivan	2,585	53.0	+3.3
Conservative	Benita Dirikis	1,192	24.4	−9.6
Liberal Democrats	Kenneth Clarke	845	17.3	N/A
Green	Liz O'Neill	255	5.2	−11.1
Majority		1,393	28.6	+12.9
Turnout		4,877	62.0	+25.0
Labour hold		Swing		

=== Timperley ward ===
Timperley
Party	Candidate	Votes	%	±%
Liberal Democrats	Neil Taylor*	2,638	42.0	−1.6
Conservative	Angela Bruer-Morris	2,384	37.9	−3.0
Labour	Margaret Westhead	863	13.7	+3.2
UKIP	Ken Bullman	253	4.0	N/A
Green	Jadwiga Leigh	144	2.3	−2.7
Majority		254	4.0	−1.3
Turnout		6,282	74.8	+30.0
Liberal Democrats hold		Swing		

=== Urmston ward ===
Urmston
Party	Candidate	Votes	%	±%
Labour	Kevin Procter	2,292	42.4	+2.4
Conservative	James Wibberley*	2,042	37.8	−8.6
Liberal Democrats	Louise Bird	821	15.2	N/A
Green	Helen Jocys	252	4.7	−8.9
Majority		250	4.6	
Turnout		5,407	67.5	+25.1
Labour gain from Conservative		Swing		

=== Village ward ===
Village
Party	Candidate	Votes	%	±%
Liberal Democrats	Tony Fishwick*	2,399	46.3	−3.0
Conservative	Richard Peers	1,644	31.7	−2.4
Labour	Thom Shelton	977	18.9	+7.3
Green	Michael Leigh	161	3.1	−1.9
Majority		755	14.6	−0.6
Turnout		5,181	66.3	+28.1
Liberal Democrats hold		Swing		
