= Ashton upon Mersey (ward) =

Electoral ward in Greater Manchester, England

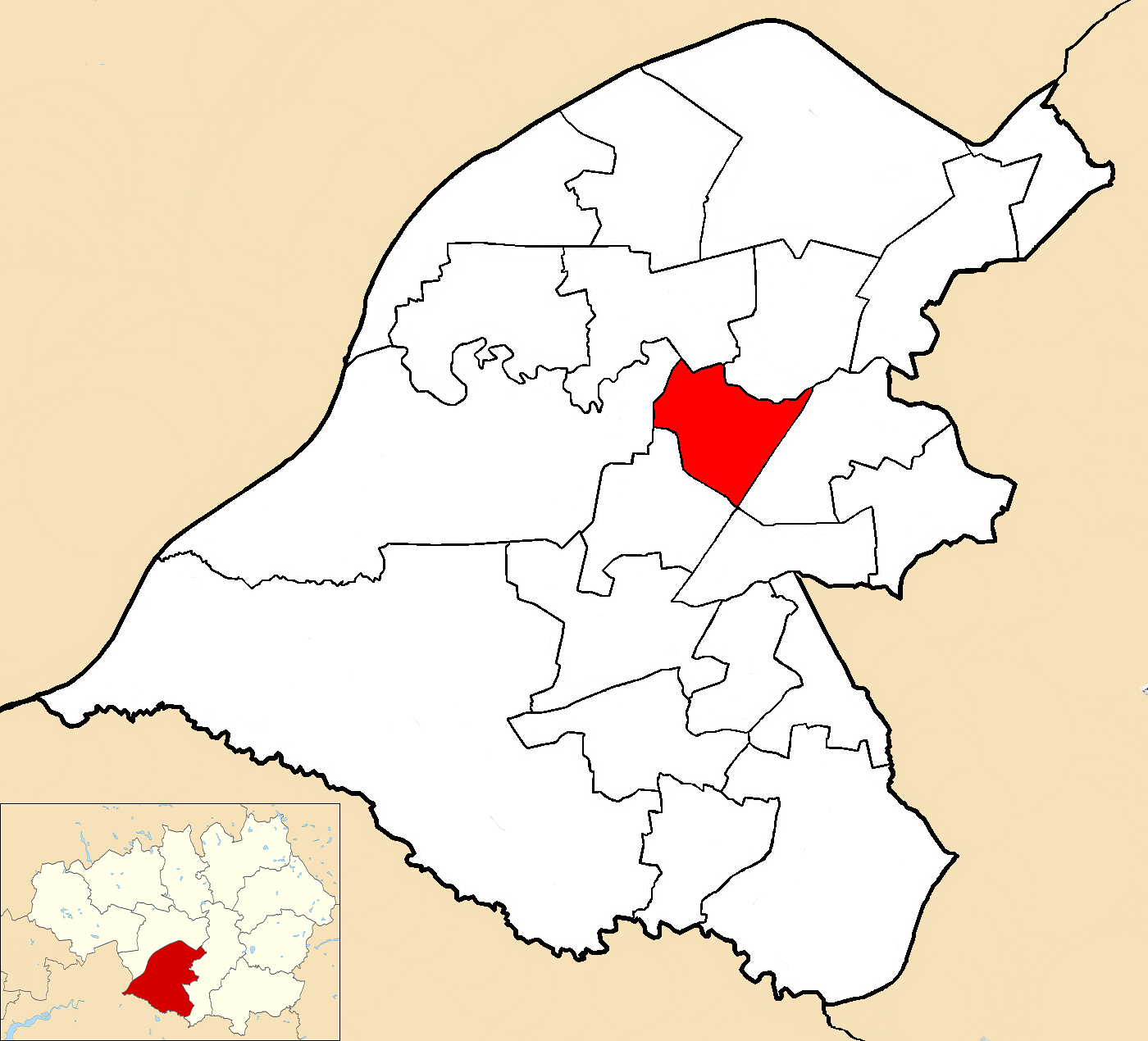
- Ashton upon Mersey within Trafford
- Population: 9,726
- Metropolitan borough: Trafford
- Metropolitan county: Greater Manchester
- Region: North West
- Country: England
- Sovereign state: United Kingdom
- UK Parliament: Altrincham and Sale West
- Councillors: Tony O'Brien (Labour); Ben Hartley (Labour); Shona Gilbert (Labour)

Ashton upon Mersey is an electoral ward of Trafford covering the northern part of Ashton upon Mersey in Sale, Greater Manchester, including Ashton Village.

The ward was created in 2004 (22 years ago) from parts of the former Mersey St. Mary's and St. Martin's wards.

== Councillors ==
As of 2022, the councillors are Tony O'Brien (Labour), Ben Hartley (Labour), and Shona Gilbert (Labour).

| Election | Councillor | Councillor | Councillor |
|---|---|---|---|
| 2004 | John Lamb (Con) | Mike Whetton (Con) | Brian Rigby (Con) |
| 2006 | John Lamb (Con) | Mike Whetton (Con) | Brian Rigby (Con) |
| 2007 | John Lamb (Con) | Mike Whetton (Con) | Brian Rigby (Con) |
| 2008 | John Lamb (Con) | Mike Whetton (Con) | Brian Rigby (Con) |
| 2010 | John Lamb (Con) | Mike Whetton (Con) | Brian Rigby (Con) |
| 2011 | John Lamb (Con) | Mike Whetton (Con) | Brian Rigby (Con) |
| 2012 | John Lamb (Con) | Mike Whetton (Con) | Brian Rigby (Con) |
| 2014 | John Lamb (Con) | Mike Whetton (Con) | Brian Rigby (Con) |
| 2015 | John Lamb (Con) | Mike Whetton (Con) | Brian Rigby (Con) |
| 2016 | John Lamb (Con) | Mike Whetton (Con) | Brian Rigby (Con) |
| 2018 | John Lamb (Con) | Mike Whetton (Con) | Brian Rigby (Con) |
| 2019 | John Lamb (Con) | Ben Hartley (Lab) | Brian Rigby (Con) |
| 2021 | John Lamb (Con) | Ben Hartley (Lab) | Shona Gilbert (Lab) |
| 2022 | Tony O'Brien (Lab) | Ben Hartley (Lab) | Shona Gilbert (Lab) |
| 2023 | Shona Gilbert (Lab) | Ben Hartley (Lab) | Tony O'Brien (Lab) |
| 2023 | Shona Gilbert (Lab) | Ben Hartley (Lab) | Tony O'Brien (Lab) |

indicates seat up for re-election.

== Elections in the 2020s ==
=== May 2026 ===
2026
| Party | Candidate | Votes | % | ±% |
|---|---|---|---|---|
| Labour | Ben Hartley* | 1,476 | 34.4 | −19.7 |
| Conservative | Christopher Halliday | 1,038 | 24.2 | −2.3 |
| Green | Diane Plunkett | 801 | 18.7 | +5.8 |
| Reform | Luke Sowerby | 683 | 15.9 | N/A |
| Liberal Democrats | Jonathan Bevan | 283 | 6.6 | +1.4 |
| Majority | | 438 | 10.2 | −17.4 |
| Rejected ballots | | 6 | 0.1 | -1.2 |
| Turnout | | 4,287 | 55.4 | +9.6 |
| Registered electors | | 7,732 | | |
| Labour hold | | Swing | -8.7 | |

=== May 2024 ===
2024
| Party | Candidate | Votes | % | ±% |
|---|---|---|---|---|
| Labour | Tony O’Brien* | 1,891 | 54.1 | −0.2 |
| Conservative | Amit Narang | 927 | 26.5 | −6.3 |
| Green | Jessica Plunkett | 449 | 12.9 | +1.1 |
| Liberal Democrats | Barney Rule | 183 | 5.2 | +0.3 |
| Majority | | 964 | 27.6 | +11.5 |
| Rejected ballots | | 44 | 1.3 | +1.0 |
| Turnout | | 3,494 | 45.8 | −0.6 |
| Registered electors | | 7,631 | | |
| Labour hold | | Swing | +3.1 | |

=== May 2023 ===
2023 (3)
| Party | Candidate | Votes | % | ±% |
|---|---|---|---|---|
| Labour | Shona Gilbert* | 1,901 | 54.3% | |
| Labour | Ben Hartley* | 1,865 | 53.3% | |
| Labour | Tony O'Brien* | 1,710 | 48.9% | |
| Conservative | Kay Dwyer | 1148 | 32.8% | |
| Conservative | John Lamb | 1130 | 32.3% | |
| Conservative | Amit Narang | 959 | 27.4% | |
| Green | Caroline Robertson-Brown | 412 | 11.8% | |
| Green | Nick Robertson-Brown | 248 | 7.1% | |
| Green | Richard Tyldesley | 198 | 5.7% | |
| Liberal Democrats | Kenneth Clarke | 171 | 4.9% | |
| Liberal Democrats | George Devine | 171 | 4.9% | |
| Liberal Democrats | David Kierman | 119 | 3.4% | |
| Majority | | | | |
| Rejected ballots | | 9 | 0.3% | |
| Turnout | | 3499 | 46.4% | |
| Registered electors | | 7,536 | | |

=== May 2022 ===
2022
| Labour | Tony O’Brien | 1,848 | 49.9 | |
| Conservative | Kay Dwyer | 1,411 | 38.1 | |
| Green | Caroline Robertson-Brow | 292 | 7.9 | |
| Liberal Democrats | David Kierman | 148 | 4.0 | |
| Majority | | 437 | 11.8 | |
| Rejected ballots | | 3 | | |
| Party | Candidate | Votes | % | ±% |
| Registered electors | | 7,633 | | |
| Turnout | | 3,702 | 48.5 | |

=== May 2021 ===
2021
| Party | Candidate | Votes | % | ±% |
|---|---|---|---|---|
| Labour | Shona Gilbert | 1,938 | 47.0 | ▲12.3 |
| Conservative | Kay Dwyer | 1,722 | 41.8 | ▼11.0 |
| Green | Caroline Robertson-Brown | 314 | 7.6 | ▲0.2 |
| Liberal Democrats | Christopher Lovell | 122 | 3.0 | ▼1.9 |
| Majority | | 216 | 5.2 | N/A |
| Rejected ballots | | 23 | | |
| Registered electors | | 7,699 | | |
| Turnout | | 4,121 | 53.5 | ▲10.6 |
| Labour gain from Conservative | | Swing | ▲11.7 | |

== Elections in the 2010s ==
=== May 2019 ===
2019
| Party | Candidate | Votes | % | ±% |
|---|---|---|---|---|
| Labour | Ben Hartley | 1,535 | 42.9 | ▼0.9 |
| Conservative | Mike Whetton* | 1,398 | 39.1 | ▼7.7 |
| Green | Caroline Robertson-Brown | 273 | 7.6 | ▲3.5 |
| Liberal Democrats | Martin Elliott | 247 | 6.9 | ▲3.0 |
| UKIP | Brian Johnson | 127 | 3.5 | ▲2.0 |
| Majority | | 137 | 3.83 | ▼9.7 |
| Registered electors | | 7,500 | | |
| Turnout | | 3,580 | 47.84 | ▲0.74 |
| Labour gain from Conservative | | Swing | | |

=== May 2018 ===
2018
| Party | Candidate | Votes | % | ±% |
|---|---|---|---|---|
| Conservative | John Lamb* | 1,677 | 46.8 | −6.1 |
| Labour | Ben Hartley | 1,568 | 43.8 | +9.0 |
| Green | Caroline Robertson-Brown | 148 | 4.1 | −3.3 |
| Liberal Democrats | Stephen Power | 138 | 3.9 | −1.0 |
| UKIP | Kevin Grime | 53 | 1.5 | N/A |
| Majority | | 109 | 3.0 | −15.1 |
| Turnout | | 3,584 | 47.1 | +4.2 |
| Conservative hold | | Swing | | |

=== May 2016 ===
2016
| Party | Candidate | Votes | % | ±% |
|---|---|---|---|---|
| Conservative | Brian Rigby* | 1,642 | 52.8 | +1.5 |
| Labour | Benjamin Hartley | 1,079 | 34.7 | +1.0 |
| Green | Caroline Robertson-Brown | 231 | 7.4 | −1.5 |
| Liberal Democrats | Christopher Marritt | 151 | 4.9 | 1.1 |
| Majority | | 563 | 18.1 | +0.7 |
| Turnout | | 3,110 | 42.9 | −30.2 |
| Conservative hold | | Swing | | |

=== May 2015 ===
2015
| Party | Candidate | Votes | % | ±% |
|---|---|---|---|---|
| Conservative | Mike Whetton* | 2,759 | 51.4 | +0.9 |
| Labour | Ben Hartley | 1,815 | 33.8 | +4.4 |
| Green | Caroline Robertson-Brown | 478 | 8.9 | −5.5 |
| Liberal Democrats | Chris Marritt | 320 | 6.0 | +0.4 |
| Majority | | 944 | 17.4 | −3.7 |
| Turnout | | 5,372 | 73.1 | +26.8 |
| Conservative hold | | Swing | | |

=== May 2014 ===
2014
| Party | Candidate | Votes | % | ±% |
|---|---|---|---|---|
| Conservative | John Lamb* | 1,505 | 50.5 | +0.4 |
| Labour | Luckson Francis-Augustine | 877 | 29.4 | −6.2 |
| Green | Nick Robertson-Brown | 431 | 14.5 | +6.1 |
| Liberal Democrats | Chris Marritt | 167 | 5.6 | −0.2 |
| Majority | | 628 | 21.1 | +6.6 |
| Turnout | | 2,980 | 41.7 | +2.7 |
| Conservative hold | | Swing | | |

=== May 2012 ===
2012
| Party | Candidate | Votes | % | ±% |
|---|---|---|---|---|
| Conservative | Brian Rigby* | 1,396 | 50.1 | −0.4 |
| Labour | Michael Wilton | 992 | 35.6 | +1.4 |
| Green | Joseph Westbrook | 235 | 8.4 | +1.7 |
| Liberal Democrats | Christopher Marritt | 161 | 5.8 | −2.7 |
| Majority | | 404 | 14.5 | −1.8 |
| Turnout | | 2,784 | 39.0 | −7.3 |
| Conservative hold | | Swing | | |

=== May 2011 ===
2011
| Party | Candidate | Votes | % | ±% |
|---|---|---|---|---|
| Conservative | Mike Whetton* | 1,715 | 50.5 | +6.0 |
| Labour | Michael Wilton | 1,162 | 34.2 | +4.2 |
| Liberal Democrats | Christopher Marritt | 288 | 8.5 | −12.7 |
| Green | Joseph Westbrook | 229 | 6.7 | +2.4 |
| Majority | | 553 | 16.3 | +1.8 |
| Turnout | | 3,394 | 46.3 | −25.2 |
| Conservative hold | | Swing | | |

=== May 2010 ===
2010
| Party | Candidate | Votes | % | ±% |
|---|---|---|---|---|
| Conservative | John Lamb* | 2,325 | 44.5 | −15.6 |
| Labour | Michael Wilton | 1,568 | 30.0 | +11.7 |
| Liberal Democrats | Terry Corbett | 1,107 | 21.2 | +7.9 |
| Green | Sara Ahsan | 224 | 4.3 | −4.0 |
| Majority | | 757 | 14.5 | −27.4 |
| Turnout | | 5224 | 71.5 | +31.1 |
| Conservative hold | | Swing | | |

== Elections in the 2000s ==
=== May 2008 ===
2008
| Party | Candidate | Votes | % | ±% |
|---|---|---|---|---|
| Conservative | Brian Rigby* | 1,762 | 60.1 | +4.8 |
| Labour | Michael Wilton | 535 | 18.3 | −2.9 |
| Liberal Democrats | Terry Corbett | 389 | 13.3 | +0.7 |
| Green | Marian Sudbury | 244 | 8.3 | −2.6 |
| Majority | | 1,227 | 41.9 | +7.8 |
| Turnout | | 2,930 | 40.4 | −1.7 |
| Conservative hold | | Swing | | |

=== May 2007 ===
2007
| Party | Candidate | Votes | % | ±% |
|---|---|---|---|---|
| Conservative | Mike Whetton* | 1,646 | 55.3 | −3.1 |
| Labour | Sophie Taylor | 631 | 21.2 | −4.7 |
| Liberal Democrats | Duncan Irving | 376 | 12.6 | +12.6 |
| Green | Marian Sudbury | 342 | 10.9 | −4.8 |
| Majority | | 1,015 | 34.1 | +1.6 |
| Turnout | | 2,977 | 42.1 | +2.7 |
| Conservative hold | | Swing | | |

=== May 2006 ===
2006
| Party | Candidate | Votes | % | ±% |
|---|---|---|---|---|
| Conservative | John Lamb* | 1,645 | 58.4 | +3.3 |
| Labour | Sophie Taylor | 728 | 25.9 | −4.0 |
| Green | Daniel Leach | 442 | 15.7 | +9.3 |
| Majority | | 917 | 32.5 | +14.0 |
| Turnout | | 2,815 | 39.4 | −10.5 |
| Conservative hold | | Swing | | |

=== May 2004 ===
2004 (after boundary changes)
| Party | Candidate | Votes | % | ±% |
|---|---|---|---|---|
| Conservative | Brian Rigby* | 1,817 | 19.9 | |
| Conservative | Michael Whetton | 1,680 | 18.4 | |
| Conservative | John Lamb* | 1,534 | 16.8 | |
| Labour | Simon Beaumont* | 969 | 10.6 | |
| Labour | Joyce Eaton | 968 | 10.6 | |
| Liberal Democrats | Terence Corbett | 798 | 8.7 | |
| Labour | Tahira Rasul | 798 | 8.7 | |
| Green | Michael Addelman | 585 | 6.4 | |
| Turnout | | 9,149 | 49.9 | |
| Conservative win (new seat) | | | | |
| Conservative win (new seat) | | | | |
| Conservative win (new seat) | | | | |
