= 2007 Trafford Metropolitan Borough Council election =

Local government contests in Greater Manchester, England

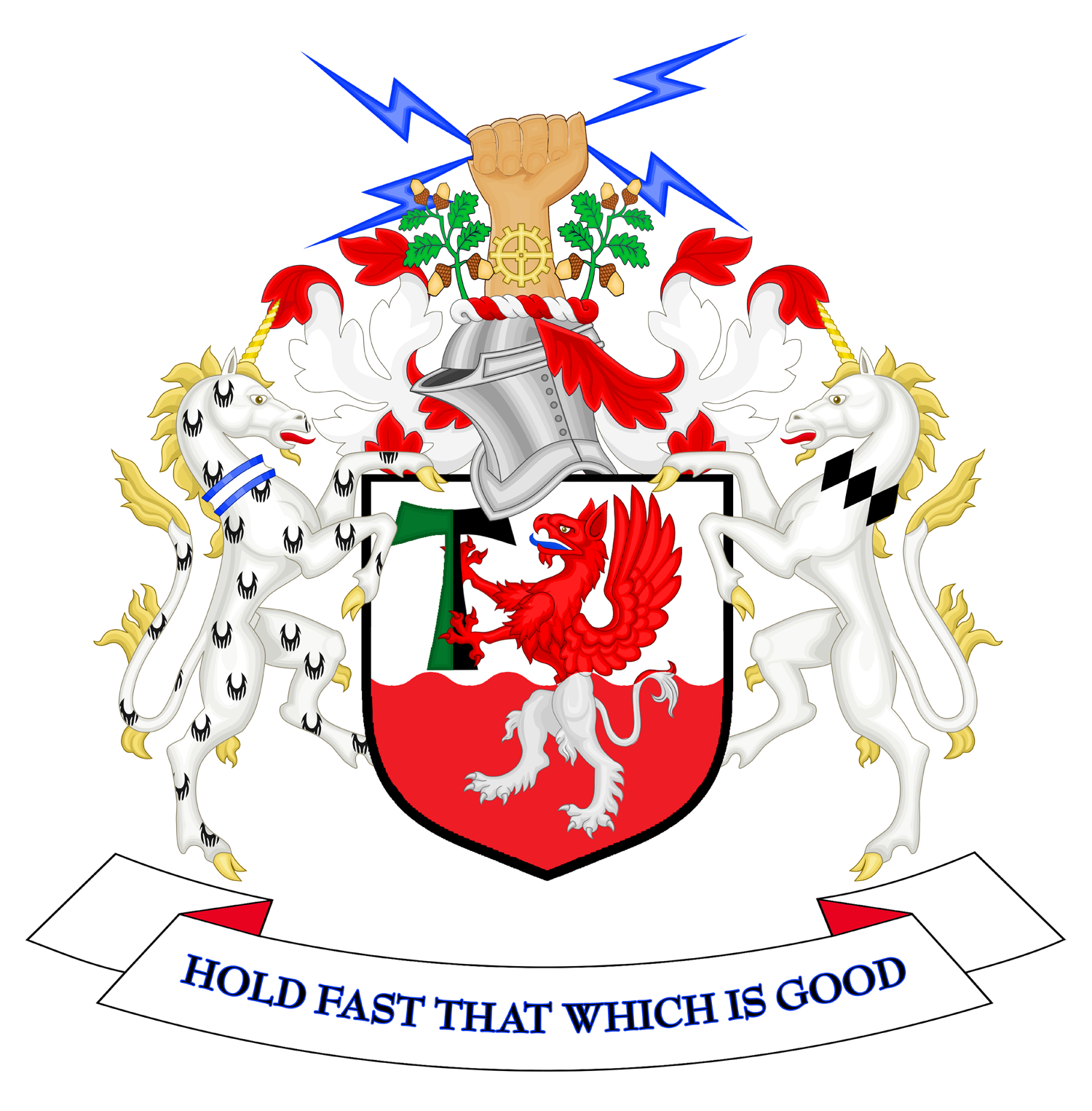
- 3 May 2007

22 of 63 seats to Trafford Metropolitan Borough Council 32 seats needed for a majority
	First party	Second party	Third party
Leader	Susan Williams	David Acton	Ray Bowker
Party	Conservative	Labour	Liberal Democrats
Leader's seat	Altrincham	Gorse Hill	Village
Last election	13 seats, 48.0%	6 seats, 30.0%	2 seats, 12.6%
Seats before	39	20	4
Seats won	13	8	1
Seats after	39	20	4
Seat change	Steady	Steady	Steady
Popular vote	29,371	18,782	9,238
Percentage	46.3%	29.6%	14.6%
Swing	▼1.7%	▼0.4%	▲2.0%
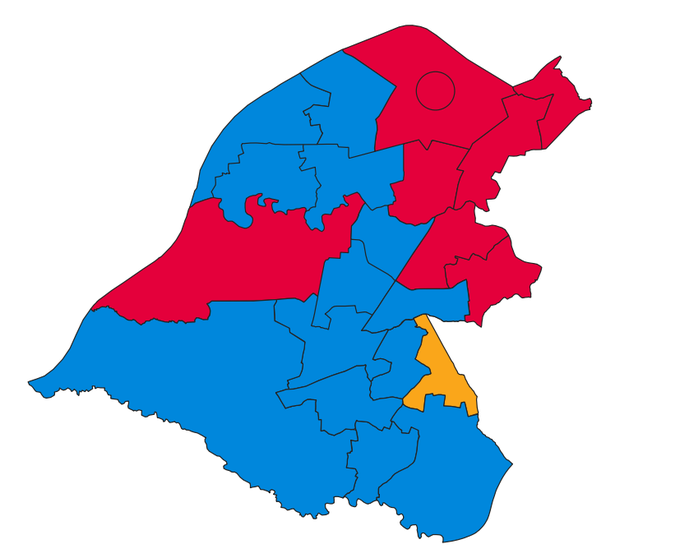
- Map of results of 2007 election
Leader of the Council before election
Susan Williams
Conservative
Leader of the Council after election
Susan Williams
Conservative

Elections to Trafford Council were held on 3 May 2007. One third of the council was up for election, with each successful candidate to serve a four-year term of office, expiring in 2011. The Conservative Party retained overall control of the council.

== Election result ==
Party	Votes		Seats			Full Council	
Conservative Party	29,371 (46.3%)	▼1.7	13 (59.1%)	13 / 22	Steady	39 (61.9%)	39 / 63
Labour Party	18,782 (29.6%)	▼0.4	8 (36.4%)	8 / 22	Steady	20 (31.7%)	20 / 63
Liberal Democrats	9,238 (14.6%)	▲2.0	1 (4.5%)	1 / 22	Steady	4 (6.3%)	4 / 63
Green Party	5,267 (8.3%)	▼0.6	0 (0.0%)	0 / 22	Steady	0 (0.0%)	0 / 63
BNP	297 (0.5%)	N/A	0 (0.0%)	0 / 22	N/A	0 (0.0%)	0 / 63
English Democrats	252 (0.4%)	N/A	0 (0.0%)	0 / 22	N/A	0 (0.0%)	0 / 63
UKIP	100 (0.2%)	▼0.1	0 (0.0%)	0 / 22	Steady	0 (0.0%)	0 / 63
Socialist Labour Party	92 (0.2%)	N/A	0 (0.0%)	0 / 22	N/A	0 (0.0%)	0 / 63

↓
20	4	39

== Ward results ==
=== Altrincham ===
Altrincham
Party	Candidate	Votes	%	±%
Conservative	Alex Williams*	1,618	56.0	+2.4
Labour	Graham Crean	651	22.5	−0.4
Liberal Democrats	Mark Kelly	413	14.3	−0.8
Green	Liz O’Neill	209	7.2	−1.2
Majority		967	33.4	+2.7
Turnout		2,819	38.1	+2.4
Conservative hold		Swing		

=== Ashton upon Mersey ===
Ashton upon Mersey
Party	Candidate	Votes	%	±%
Conservative	Mike Whetton*	1,646	55.3	−3.1
Labour	Sophie Taylor	631	21.2	−4.7
Liberal Democrats	Duncan Irving	376	12.6	+12.6
Green	Marian Sudbury	342	10.9	−4.8
Majority		1,015	34.1	+1.6
Turnout		2,977	42.1	+2.7
Conservative hold		Swing		

=== Bowdon ===
Bowdon
Party	Candidate	Votes	%	±%
Conservative	Stephanie Poole*	2,132	71.0	+1.2
Liberal Democrats	Ian Chappell	351	11.7	−1.2
Labour	Thomas Hague	297	9.9	−0.2
Green	Bridget Green	222	7.4	+0.2
Majority		1,781	59.3	+2.4
Turnout		3,002	41.5	−2.0
Conservative hold		Swing		

=== Broadheath ===
Broadheath
Party	Candidate	Votes	%	±%
Conservative	Ken Weston*	1,530	51.2	+1.6
Labour	Peter Baugh	834	27.9	+2.1
Liberal Democrats	Pauline Cliff	397	13.3	−1.9
Green	Martin Bate	226	7.6	−1.8
Majority		696	23.3	−0.5
Turnout		2,987	36.4	−9.5
Conservative hold		Swing		

=== Brooklands ===
Brooklands
Party	Candidate	Votes	%	±%
Conservative	David Higgins*	1,769	56.2	−3.3
Liberal Democrats	Kenneth Clarke	614	19.5	−4.3
Labour	David Hampson	536	17.0	+0.2
Green	Nicola Campling	229	7.3	+7.3
Majority		1,155	36.7	+1.0
Turnout		3,148	40.3	+1.4
Conservative hold		Swing		

=== Bucklow-St. Martin's ===
Bucklow-St. Martins
Party	Candidate	Votes	%	±%
Labour	John Smith	1,106	52.6	−0.9
Conservative	Anne Cavanagh	517	24.6	−6.4
BNP	Andrew Harris	297	14.1	+14.1
Green	William Gradwell	181	8.6	−6.9
Majority		589	28.0	+5.5
Turnout		2,101	31.4	+3.4
Labour hold		Swing		

=== Clifford ===
Clifford
Party	Candidate	Votes	%	±%
Labour	Ejaz Malik*	1,364	59.2	−4.8
Green	Sarah Bailey	352	15.3	−3.9
Liberal Democrats	Matthew Adams	297	12.9	+12.9
Conservative	Eleanor Heaton	292	12.7	−4.0
Majority		1,012	43.9	−0.9
Turnout		2,305	33.4	+1.5
Labour hold		Swing		

=== Davyhulme East ===
Davyhulme East
Party	Candidate	Votes	%	±%
Conservative	Gary Brockbanks*	1,679	58.4	−4.7
Labour	Nigel Roberts	902	31.4	−5.5
Green	Jennie Gander	202	7.0	+7.0
Socialist Labour	James Flannery	92	3.2	+3.2
Majority		777	27.0	+0.8
Turnout		2,875	38.2	+1.7
Conservative hold		Swing		

=== Davyhulme West ===
Davyhulme West
Party	Candidate	Votes	%	±%
Conservative	John Reilly*	1,784	60.6	−0.8
Labour	Philip Morgan	891	30.3	+2.0
Green	Margaret Westbrook	267	9.1	−1.2
Majority		893	30.4	−2.7
Turnout		2,942	39.2	+0.5
Conservative hold		Swing		

=== Flixton ===
Flixton
Party	Candidate	Votes	%	±%
Conservative	Jonathan Coupe*	1,652	50.7	−2.7
Labour	Dolores O’Sullivan	1,054	32.4	−1.0
Liberal Democrats	Martin Elliott	330	10.1	+10.1
Green	Anne Power	220	6.8	−6.4
Majority		598	18.4	−1.6
Turnout		3,256	40.2	+1.8
Conservative hold		Swing		

=== Gorse Hill ===
Gorse Hill (2 vacancies)
Party	Candidate	Votes	%	±%
Labour	Mike Cordingley	1,211	30.0	+4.5
Labour	Laurence Walsh*	1,125	27.9	+0.3
Conservative	Colin Levenston	502	12.5	+0.2
Conservative	Graeme Levenston	431	10.7	−3.4
Liberal Democrats	Francis Beswick	290	7.2	+7.2
Green	Sarah King	264	6.6	+1.3
Green	Philip Leape	208	5.2	−1.5
Majority		623	30.9	+0.2
Turnout		4,031	28.8	+1.5
Labour hold		Swing		
Labour hold		Swing		

=== Hale Barns ===
Hale Barns
Party	Candidate	Votes	%	±%
Conservative	Bernard Sharp*	2,177	69.8	−1.3
Liberal Democrats	Sandra Taylor	511	16.4	−2.2
Labour	Andrew Western	284	9.1	−1.3
Green	Jane Smith	148	4.7	+4.7
Majority		1,666	53.4	+0.9
Turnout		3,120	42.2	+3.0
Conservative hold		Swing		

=== Hale Central ===
Hale Central
Party	Candidate	Votes	%	±%
Conservative	Patricia Young*	1,813	63.2	+2.2
Labour	Beverly Harrison	395	13.8	+1.3
Green	Samuel Little	364	12.7	+1.7
Liberal Democrats	Armaan Chohan	299	10.4	−5.1
Majority		1,418	49.4	+3.9
Turnout		2,871	40.5	+1.9
Conservative hold		Swing		

=== Longford ===
Longford
Party	Candidate	Votes	%	±%
Labour	Pauleen Lane*	1,313	45.5	−2.5
Conservative	Roderick Allan	868	30.1	−2.1
Green	Bernard Kelly	388	13.4	−0.9
Liberal Democrats	Simon Wright	317	11.0	+11.0
Majority		445	15.4	−0.4
Turnout		2,886	35.1	+1.5
Labour hold		Swing		

=== Priory ===
Priory
Party	Candidate	Votes	%	±%
Labour	Roland Griffin*	1,225	42.1	+2.9
Conservative	Sean Anstee	927	31.8	−1.4
Liberal Democrats	James Eisen	412	14.2	−3.6
Green	Zoe Power	348	12.0	+2.2
Majority		298	10.2	+4.2
Turnout		2,912	39.6	+0.3
Labour hold		Swing		

=== Sale Moor ===
Sale Moor
Party	Candidate	Votes	%	±%
Labour	Joanne Bennett*	1,175	40.6	+1.5
Conservative	Brian Shaw	1,013	35.0	−5.0
Liberal Democrats	Margaret Clarke	306	10.6	−10.3
English Democrat	Craig Healey	252	8.7	+8.7
Green	Bridget Battye	150	5.2	+5.2
Majority		162	5.6	+4.7
Turnout		2,896	39.2	+2.6
Labour hold		Swing		

=== St. Mary's ===
St. Mary's
Party	Candidate	Votes	%	±%
Conservative	Dan Bunting*	1,642	54.9	+2.7
Labour	Tom Ross	783	26.2	−1.8
Liberal Democrats	Diane Webster	332	11.1	−2.1
Green	Simon Campling	134	4.5	−2.2
UKIP	Stephen Farndon	100	3.3	+3.3
Majority		859	28.7	+4.5
Turnout		2,991	36.2	−0.6
Conservative hold		Swing		

=== Stretford ===
Stretford
Party	Candidate	Votes	%	±%
Labour	Steve Adshead*	1,398	50.9	+1.2
Conservative	Colin Hooley	849	30.9	−3.1
Liberal Democrats	John O’Connor	263	9.6	+9.6
Green	Joe Ryan	237	8.6	−7.7
Majority		549	20.0	+4.3
Turnout		2,747	36.9	−0.1
Labour hold		Swing		

=== Timperley ===
Timperley
Party	Candidate	Votes	%	±%
Conservative	Matthew Colledge*	1,955	48.3	+7.4
Liberal Democrats	Jane Brophy	1,924	47.5	+3.9
Green	Jadwiga Leigh	168	4.2	−0.8
Majority		31	0.8	−1.9
Turnout		4,047	49.3	+4.5
Conservative hold		Swing		

=== Urmston ===
Urmston
Party	Candidate	Votes	%	±%
Conservative	Eddie Kelson	1,450	43.6	−2.8
Labour	William Clarke	1,308	39.3	−0.7
Green	Helen Jocys	296	8.9	−4.7
Liberal Democrats	Graham Rogers	272	8.2	+8.2
Majority		142	4.3	−2.1
Turnout		3,326	42.7	+0.3
Conservative hold		Swing		

=== Village ===
Village
Party	Candidate	Votes	%	±%
Liberal Democrats	Hazel Bowker	1,534	49.7	+0.4
Conservative	Chris Candish	1,125	36.4	+2.3
Labour	Leon Thomas	299	9.7	−1.9
Green	Michael Leigh	130	4.2	−0.8
Majority		409	13.2	−2.0
Turnout		3,088	40.1	+1.9
Liberal Democrats hold		Swing		
