= Limelight Health and Well-being Hub =

Coordinates: 53.461°N 2.262°W

Limelight is a community health centre in Old Trafford run by Trafford Housing Trust designed to improve the health outcomes of local people. It contains 81 extra care apartments, two GP surgeries, a public library, a community café, an optician, a pharmacy, a hair and beauty salon, and a 40-place children's nursery. There are event spaces that can be hired for weddings or business meetings. St Bride's Church and rectory has also relocated to the site.

== Construction ==
It was built by Willmott Dixon and opened in 2017 by Lemn Sissay and Diane Modahl.

== Features and residents ==
The apartments are restricted to people aged 55 and over who need care and support. Some are rented and some are leased. There are support staff on the premises at all times.

A resident-led management committee was established before the building was opened. It is the District Nursing base for North Trafford. The area has a substantial African Caribbean population and efforts have been made to involve them in the design and running of the centre. It is intended to be an intergenerational space with activities for young families, teenagers and older people.

== Reception ==
It won the prizes for the best older people's housing development and best affordable housing development (in the larger category) at the Inside Housing Development Awards 2018. It was the only development to win two prizes. The judges described it as "a creative and iconic reimagining of terraced houses that provides a variety of tenures and satisfies high environmental and design standards” and ""A truly outstanding scheme of bold, statement architecture".
