= Stretford (ward) =

Electoral ward of Trafford, Greater Manchester, England

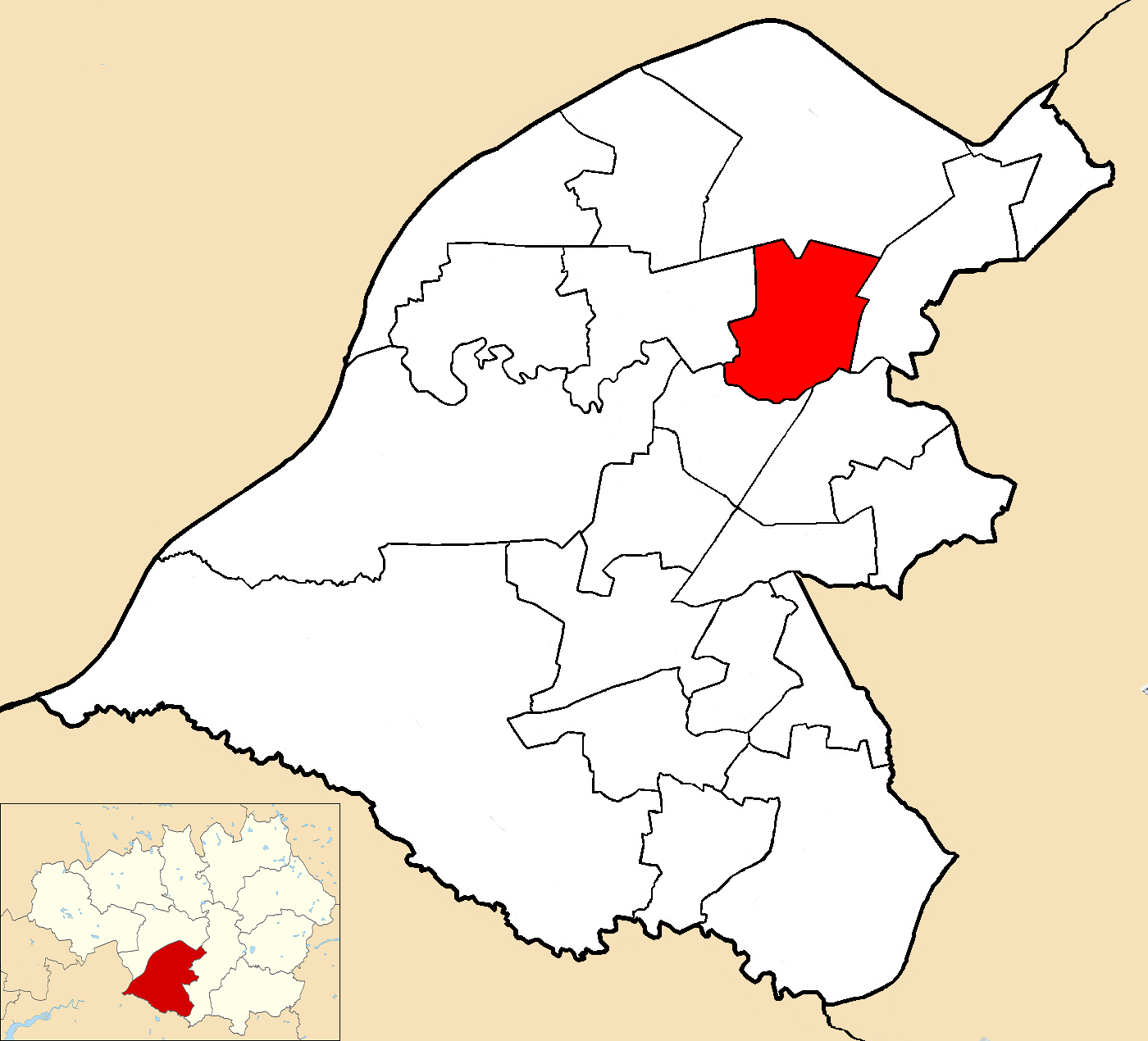
- Stretford within Trafford
- Population: 11,318
- Metropolitan borough: Trafford
- Metropolitan county: Greater Manchester
- Country: England
- Sovereign state: United Kingdom
- UK Parliament: Stretford and Urmston
- Councillors: Jane Slater (Labour); Stephen Adshead (Labour); Tom Ross (Labour)

Stretford is an electoral ward of Trafford, Greater Manchester, England, covering the south-west part of Stretford, including the town centre.

== Councillors ==
As of 2022, the councillors are Jane Slater (Labour), Stephen Adshead (Labour), and Tom Ross (Labour).

Election	Councillor	Councillor	Councillor
1973	Margaret Hindley (Con)	Colin Warbrick (Con)	Harry Walker (Con)
1975	Margaret Hindley (Con)	Colin Warbrick (Con)	Harry Walker (Con)
1976	Margaret Hindley (Con)	Colin Warbrick (Con)	Harry Walker (Con)
1978	Margaret Hindley (Con)	Colin Warbrick (Con)	Harry Walker (Con)
1979	Margaret Hindley (Con)	Colin Warbrick (Con)	Harry Walker (Con)
1980	Margaret Hindley (Con)	Chris Reid (Lab)	Harry Walker (Con)
1982	Margaret Hindley (Con)	Chris Reid (Lab)	Harry Walker (Con)
1983	Margaret Hindley (Con)	Chris Reid (Lab)	Harry Walker (Con)
1984	Margaret Hindley (Con)	Frank Redfern (Con)	Harry Walker (Con)
1986	Stephen Adshead (Lab)	Frank Redfern (Con)	Harry Walker (Con)
1987	Stephen Adshead (Lab)	Frank Redfern (Con)	Harry Walker (Con)
1988	Stephen Adshead (Lab)	John Beer (Lab)	Harry Walker (Con)
1990	Stephen Adshead (Lab)	John Beer (Lab)	Harry Walker (Con)
1991	Stephen Adshead (Lab)	John Beer (Lab)	Harry Walker (Con)
Dec 1991	Stephen Adshead (Lab)	John Beer (Lab)	Bernice Garlick (Lab)
1992	Stephen Adshead (Lab)	Harry Walker (Con)	Bernice Garlick (Lab)
1994	Stephen Adshead (Lab)	Harry Walker (Con)	Bernice Garlick (Lab)
1995	Stephen Adshead (Lab)	Harry Walker (Con)	Bernice Garlick (Lab)
1996	Stephen Adshead (Lab)	Paul Dolan (Lab)	Bernice Garlick (Lab)
1998	Stephen Adshead (Lab)	Paul Dolan (Lab)	Bernice Garlick (Lab)
1999	Stephen Adshead (Lab)	Paul Dolan (Lab)	Bernice Garlick (Lab)
2000	Stephen Adshead (Lab)	Paul Dolan (Lab)	Bernice Garlick (Lab)
2002	Stephen Adshead (Lab)	Paul Dolan (Lab)	Bernice Garlick (Lab)
2003	Stephen Adshead (Lab)	Paul Dolan (Lab)	Bernice Garlick (Lab)
2004	Bernice Garlick (Lab)	Stephen Adshead (Lab)	Karina Carter (Lab)
2006	Bernice Garlick (Lab)	Stephen Adshead (Lab)	Karina Carter (Lab)
2007	Bernice Garlick (Lab)	Stephen Adshead (Lab)	Karina Carter (Lab)
2008	Tom Ross (Lab)	Stephen Adshead (Lab)	Karina Carter (Lab)
2010	Tom Ross (Lab)	Stephen Adshead (Lab)	Dolores O'Sullivan (Lab)
2011	Tom Ross (Lab)	Stephen Adshead (Lab)	Dolores O'Sullivan (Lab)
2012	Tom Ross (Lab)	Stephen Adshead (Lab)	Dolores O'Sullivan (Lab)
2014	Tom Ross (Lab)	Stephen Adshead (Lab)	Dolores O'Sullivan (Lab)
2015	Tom Ross (Lab)	Stephen Adshead (Lab)	Dolores O'Sullivan (Lab)
2016	Tom Ross (Lab)	Stephen Adshead (Lab)	Dolores O'Sullivan (Lab)
2018	Tom Ross (Lab)	Stephen Adshead (Lab)	Jane Slater (Lab)
2019	Tom Ross (Lab)	Stephen Adshead (Lab)	Jane Slater (Lab)
2021	Tom Ross (Lab)	Stephen Adshead (Lab)	Jane Slater (Lab)
2022	Tom Ross (Lab)	Stephen Adshead (Lab)	Jane Slater (Lab)

indicates seat up for re-election.

== Elections in the 2020s ==
=== May 2022 ===
2022
Party	Candidate	Votes	%	±%
Labour	Jane Slater*	2,013	70.9	
Conservative	Susan Taylor	431	15.2	
Green	Liz O’Neill	281	9.9	
Liberal Democrats	Stephen Power	104	3.7	
Majority		1,582	55.7	
Registered electors		7,882		
Turnout		2,841	36.0	
Labour hold		Swing		

=== May 2021 ===
2021
Party	Candidate	Votes	%	±%
Labour	Tom Ross*	2,160	66.7	▲0.4
Conservative	Colin Hooley	625	19.3	▼2.4
Green	Liz O'Neill	356	11.0	▲2.8
Liberal Democrats	Stephen Power	72	2.2	▼1.1
Majority		1,535	47.4	▲2.8
Rejected ballots		26		
Registered electors		7,974		
Turnout		3,239	40.6	▲0.6
Labour hold		Swing	▲1.4	

== Elections in the 2010s ==
=== May 2019 ===
2019
Party	Candidate	Votes	%	±%
Labour	Stephen Adshead*	1,843	66.0	▼5.5
Conservative	Kwok Leung	329	11.8	▼3.9
Green	Liz O'Neill	304	10.9	▲4.1
UKIP	Barbara McDermott	208	7.5	▲4.6
Liberal Democrats	Simon Lepori	107	3.8	▲0.7
Majority		1,514	54.2	▼1.6
Registered electors		7,843		
Turnout		2,791	35.6	▼3.9
Labour hold		Swing		

=== May 2018 ===
2018
Party	Candidate	Votes	%	±%
Labour	Jane Slater	2,231	71.5	+4.9
Conservative	Shengke Zhi	490	15.7	−6.1
Green	Liz O'Neill	211	6.8	−1.5
Liberal Democrats	Simon Lepori	98	3.1	−0.2
UKIP	Ian Royle	92	2.9	+2.9
Majority		1,741	55.8	
Turnout		3,122	39.5	−0.5
Labour hold		Swing		

=== May 2016 ===
2016
Party	Candidate	Votes	%	±%
Labour	Tom Ross*	2,004	66.3	+6.6
Conservative	Colin Hooley	656	21.7	−1.7
Green	Liz O'Neill	249	8.2	−4.3
Liberal Democrats	Shaun Ennis	100	3.3	−0.6
Majority		1,348	44.6	+8.3
Turnout		3,021	40.0	+26.2
Labour hold		Swing		

=== May 2015 ===
2015
Party	Candidate	Votes	%	±%
Labour	Stephen Adshead*	3,084	60.0	+2.0
Conservative	Colin Hooley	1,207	23.5	+0.8
Green	Liz O'Neill	649	12.6	−3.3
Liberal Democrats	Craig Thomas	203	3.9	+0.5
Majority		1,877	36.5	+1.3
Turnout		5,143	66.5	+27.8
Labour hold		Swing		

=== May 2014 ===
2014
Party	Candidate	Votes	%	±%
Labour	Dolores O'Sullivan*	1,718	58.0	−4.4
Conservative	Colin Hooley	674	22.7	+4.9
Green	Liz O'Neill	471	15.9	+5.9
Liberal Democrats	David Martin	100	3.4	−0.2
Majority		1,044	35.2	−9.4
Turnout		2,963	38.7	
Labour hold		Swing		

=== May 2012 ===
2012
Party	Candidate	Votes	%	±%
Labour	Tom Ross*	1,666	62.4	+1.2
Conservative	Michael Parris	475	17.8	−6.6
Green	Liz O'Neill	266	10.0	+0.5
UKIP	Jan Brzozowski	167	6.3	+6.3
Liberal Democrats	Kirsty Cullen	95	3.6	−1.3
Majority		1,191	44.6	+7.8
Turnout		2,669	35.6	−4.7
Labour hold		Swing		

=== May 2011 ===
2011
Party	Candidate	Votes	%	±%
Labour	Stephen Adshead*	1,923	61.2	+8.2
Conservative	Colin Hooley	766	24.4	0
Green	Liz O'Neill	299	9.5	+4.3
Liberal Democrats	Louise Shaw	154	4.9	−12.4
Majority		1,157	36.8	+8.2
Turnout		3,142	40.3	−21.7
Labour hold		Swing		

=== May 2010 ===
2010
Party	Candidate	Votes	%	±%
Labour	Dolores O'Sullivan	2,585	53.0	+3.3
Conservative	Benita Dirikis	1,192	24.4	−8.7
Liberal Democrats	Kenneth Clarke	845	17.3	+9.2
Green	Liz O'Neill	255	5.2	−3.9
Majority		1,393	28.6	+12.0
Turnout		4,877	62.0	+27.0
Labour hold		Swing		

== Elections in the 2000s ==
=== May 2008 ===
2008
Party	Candidate	Votes	%	±%
Labour	Tom Ross	1,345	49.7	−1.2
Conservative	Colin Hooley	896	33.1	+2.2
Green	Liz O'Neill	247	9.1	−0.5
Liberal Democrats	John O'Connor	218	8.1	−1.5
Majority		449	16.6	−3.4
Turnout		2,706	35.0	−1.9
Labour hold		Swing		

=== May 2007 ===
2007
Party	Candidate	Votes	%	±%
Labour	Steve Adshead*	1,398	50.9	+1.2
Conservative	Colin Hooley	849	30.9	−3.1
Liberal Democrats	John O’Connor	263	9.6	+9.6
Green	Joe Ryan	237	8.6	−7.7
Majority		549	20.0	+4.3
Turnout		2,747	36.9	−0.1
Labour hold		Swing		

=== May 2006 ===
2006
Party	Candidate	Votes	%	±%
Labour	Karina Carter*	1,355	49.7	−2.2
Conservative	Colin Hooley	926	34.0	−7.5
Green	Jennie Gander	445	16.3	+16.3
Majority		429	15.7	+12.6
Turnout		2,726	37.0	−0.1
Labour hold		Swing		

=== May 2004 ===
2004 (after boundary changes)
Party	Candidate	Votes	%	±%
Labour	Bernice Garlick*	1,299	18.9	
Labour	Stephen Adshead*	1,242	18.0	
Labour	Karina Carter	1,036	15.0	
Conservative	Benita Dirikis	966	14.0	
Conservative	George Manley	948	13.8	
Conservative	Colin Hooley	945	13.7	
Liberal Democrats	Mohammed Mian	449	6.5	
Turnout		6,885	37.1	
Labour win (new seat)				
Labour win (new seat)				
Labour win (new seat)				

=== May 2003 ===
2003
Party	Candidate	Votes	%	±%
Labour	Bernice Garlick*	1,987	54.2	−4.1
Conservative	George Manley	1,331	36.3	−0.5
Green	Antony Quinn	350	9.5	+9.5
Majority		656	17.9	−3.6
Turnout		3,668	49.1	−1.7
Labour hold		Swing		

=== May 2002 ===
2002
Party	Candidate	Votes	%	±%
Labour	Stephen Adshead*	2,224	58.3	+1.4
Conservative	John Lamb	1,403	36.8	−6.3
Socialist Labour	Prudence Hibberd	189	5.0	+5.0
Majority		821	21.5	+7.7
Turnout		3,816	50.8	+18.3
Labour hold		Swing		

=== May 2000 ===
2000
Party	Candidate	Votes	%	±%
Labour	Paul Dolan*	1,406	56.9	−0.6
Conservative	John Schofield	1,066	43.1	+5.2
Majority		340	13.8	−5.8
Turnout		2,472	32.5	−1.4
Labour hold		Swing		

== Elections in the 1990s ==
1999
Party	Candidate	Votes	%	±%
Labour	Garlick*	1,475	57.5	−2.0
Conservative	Schofield	973	37.9	+2.9
Liberal Democrats	Rogers	118	4.6	+4.6
Majority		502	19.6	−4.9
Turnout		2,566	33.9	+1.9
Labour hold		Swing		

1998
Party	Candidate	Votes	%	±%
Labour	S. A. Adshead*	1,449	59.5	−2.8
Conservative	K. G. Summerfield	851	35.0	−2.7
Socialist Labour	P. J. Hibberd	135	5.5	+5.5
Majority		598	24.5	0
Turnout		2,435	32.0	−8.1
Labour hold		Swing		

1996
Party	Candidate	Votes	%	±%
Labour	P. Dolan	1,899	62.3	−3.9
Conservative	H. Walker*	1,151	37.7	+3.9
Majority		748	24.5	−7.9
Turnout		3,050	40.1	−2.8
Labour gain from Conservative		Swing		

1995
Party	Candidate	Votes	%	±%
Labour	B. E. Garlick*	2,176	66.2	+8.2
Conservative	J. T. Kelly	1,110	33.8	+0.5
Majority		1,066	32.4	+7.6
Turnout		3,286	42.9	−3.7
Labour hold		Swing		

1994
Party	Candidate	Votes	%	±%
Labour	S. A. Adshead*	2,105	58.0	+15.3
Conservative	J. T. Kelly	1,207	33.3	−19.9
Liberal Democrats	J. M. Walmsley	316	8.7	+5.5
Majority		898	24.8	+14.3
Turnout		3,628	46.6	−1.8
Labour hold		Swing		

1992
Party	Candidate	Votes	%	±%
Conservative	H. Walker	2,048	53.2	+7.3
Labour	J. T. Beer*	1,643	42.7	−3.1
Liberal Democrats	S. D. Bowater	125	3.2	−5.0
Green	C. I. Kirby	36	0.9	+0.9
Majority		405	10.5	+10.4
Turnout		3,852	48.4	−1.1
Conservative gain from Labour		Swing		

By-Election 5 December 1991
Party	Candidate	Votes	%	±%
Labour	B. E. Garlick	1,656	48.0	+2.2
Conservative	H. Walker*	1,654	47.9	−2.0
Liberal Democrats	F. C. Beswick	140	4.1	−4.1
Majority		2	0.1	+34.1
Turnout		3,450	42.9	−6.6
Labour gain from Conservative		Swing		

1991
Party	Candidate	Votes	%	±%
Conservative	H. Walker*	1,827	45.9	+5.8
Labour	B. E. Garlick	1,822	45.8	−5.8
Liberal Democrats	F. C. Beswick	328	8.2	+3.4
Majority		5	0.1	−11.3
Turnout		3,977	49.5	−1.0
Conservative hold		Swing		

1990
Party	Candidate	Votes	%	±%
Labour	S. Adshead*	2,097	51.6	+3.7
Conservative	F. D. Redfern	1,632	40.1	−6.7
Liberal Democrats	F. C. Beswick	194	4.8	−0.5
Green	E. M. Jocys	143	3.5	+3.5
Majority		465	11.4	+10.2
Turnout		4,066	50.5	+2.7
Labour hold		Swing		

== Elections in the 1980s ==
1988
Party	Candidate	Votes	%	±%
Labour	J. T. Beer	1,872	47.9	+10.0
Conservative	F. D. Redfern*	1,826	46.8	−2.0
Liberal Democrats	L. L. Sumner	207	5.3	−8.0
Majority		46	1.2	−9.7
Turnout		3,905	47.8	−3.1
Labour gain from Conservative		Swing		

1987
Party	Candidate	Votes	%	±%
Conservative	H. Walker*	2,042	48.8	+8.6
Labour	J. T. Beer	1,587	37.9	−10.1
SDP	L. L. Sumner	559	13.3	+1.5
Majority		455	10.9	+3.1
Turnout		4,188	50.9	+5.7
Conservative hold		Swing		

1986
Party	Candidate	Votes	%	±%
Labour	S. A. Adshead	1,772	48.0	+5.6
Conservative	M. Hindley*	1,483	40.2	−5.6
SDP	L. L. Sumner	437	11.8	0
Majority		289	7.8	+4.4
Turnout		3,692	45.2	+1.9
Labour gain from Conservative		Swing		

1984
Party	Candidate	Votes	%	±%
Conservative	F. D. Redfern	1,616	45.8	−1.6
Labour	J. F. L. Wood	1,496	42.4	+2.3
SDP	L. L. Sumner	416	11.8	−0.7
Majority		120	3.4	−3.8
Turnout		3,528	43.3	−4.7
Conservative gain from Labour		Swing		

1983
Party	Candidate	Votes	%	±%
Conservative	H. Walker*	1,886	47.4	−3.9
Labour	J. F. L. Wood	1,598	40.1	+9.9
Alliance	L. L. Sumner	498	12.5	−6.0
Majority		288	7.2	−14.1
Turnout		3,982	48.0	+3.4
Conservative hold		Swing		

1982
Party	Candidate	Votes	%	±%
Conservative	M. Hindley*	1,886	51.3	+5.9
Labour	G. Woodburn	1,107	30.2	−24.4
SDP	L. L. Sumner	679	18.5	+18.5
Majority		779	21.3	+12.1
Turnout		3,664	44.6	+1.3
Conservative hold		Swing		

1980
Party	Candidate	Votes	%	±%
Labour	C. Reid	1,952	54.6	+19.7
Conservative	C. Warbrick*	1,623	45.4	−8.4
Majority		329	9.2	−9.7
Turnout		3,575	43.3	−34.7
Labour gain from Conservative		Swing		

== Elections in the 1970s ==
1979
Party	Candidate	Votes	%	±%
Conservative	H. Walker*	2,480	53.8	−14.7
Labour	C. Reid	1,608	34.9	+3.4
Liberal	R. J. Allan	521	11.3	+11.3
Majority		872	18.9	−18.1
Turnout		4,609	78.0	+38.0
Conservative hold		Swing		

1978
Party	Candidate	Votes	%	±%
Conservative	M. Hindley*	1,591	68.5	+4.1
Labour	R. A. Tully	732	31.5	+3.2
Majority		859	37.0	+0.9
Turnout		2,323	40.0	−2.3
Conservative hold		Swing		

1976
Party	Candidate	Votes	%	±%
Conservative	C. Warbrick*	1,587	64.4	+1.2
Labour	G. R. Scott	698	28.3	+3.0
Liberal	C. R. Hedley	181	7.3	−4.2
Majority		889	36.1	−1.8
Turnout		2,466	42.3	+3.3
Conservative hold		Swing		

1975
Party	Candidate	Votes	%	±%
Conservative	H. Walker*	1,468	63.2	
Labour	G. R. Scott	588	25.3	
Liberal	R. K. Sangster	268	11.5	
Majority		880	37.9	
Turnout		2,324	39.0	
Conservative hold		Swing		

1973
Party	Candidate	Votes	%	±%
Conservative	M. Hindley	1,583	66.7	
Conservative	C. Warbrick	1,493		
Conservative	H. Walker	1,492		
Labour	E. Wollaston	789	33.3	
Labour	I. Gregory	777		
Labour	J. Haydock	777		
Majority		703		
Turnout		2,372	39.0	
Conservative win (new seat)				
Conservative win (new seat)				
Conservative win (new seat)				
