= Hale Barns (ward) =

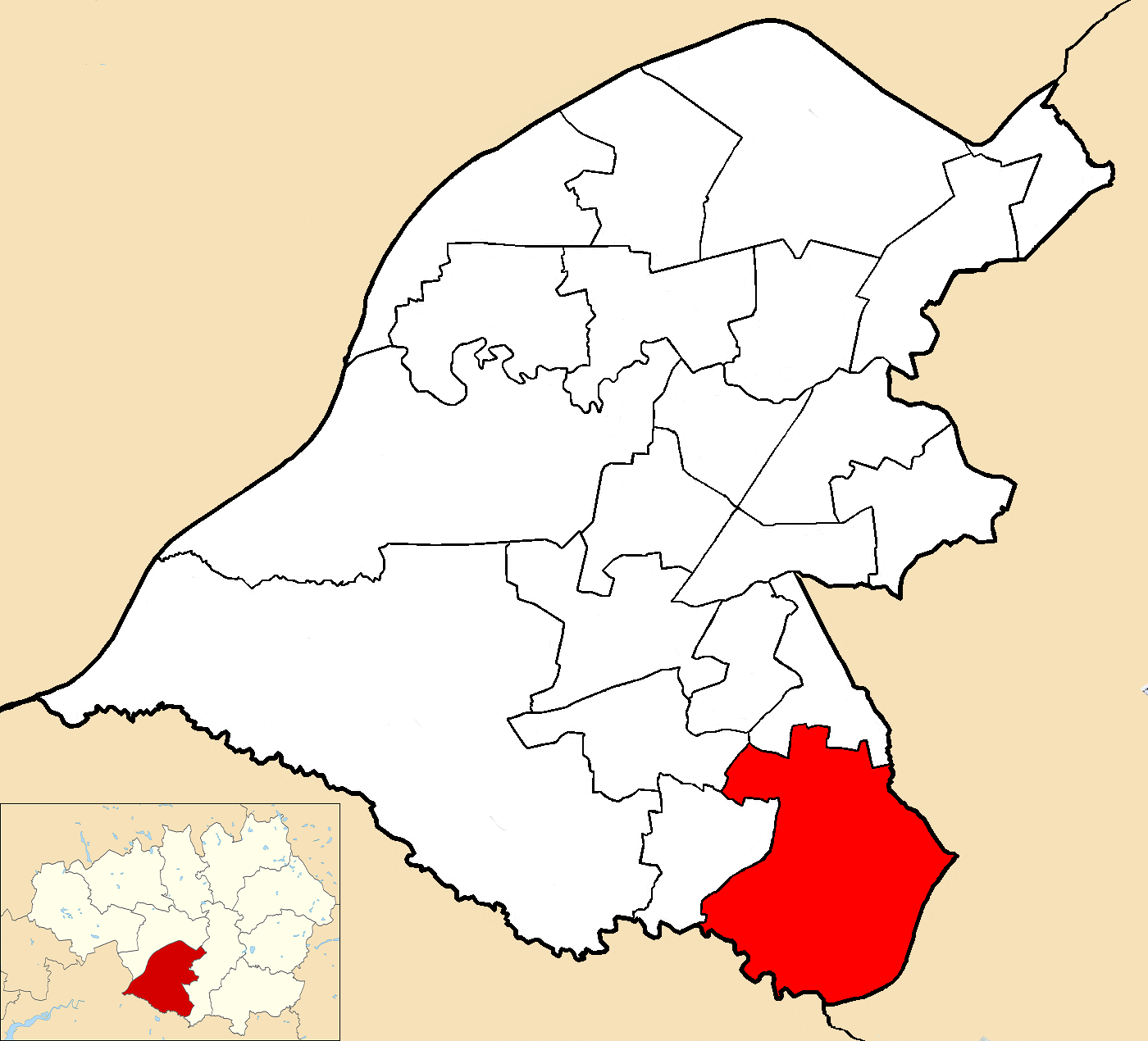
- Hale Barns within Trafford
- Population: 9,812
- Metropolitan borough: Trafford
- Metropolitan county: Greater Manchester
- Country: England
- Sovereign state: United Kingdom
- UK Parliament: Altrincham and Sale West
- Councillors: Dylan Butt (Conservative); Dave Morgan (Conservative); Patrick Myers (Conservative)

Hale Barns was an electoral ward of Trafford covering the village of Hale Barns and parts of the villages of Hale and Timperley. The ward was created in 2004, mostly from the Hale ward but it also included a small part of Village ward.

== Councillors ==
Since 2022, the councillors are Dylan Butt (Conservative), Dave Morgan (Conservative), and Patrick Myers (Conservative).

Election	Councillor	Councillor	Councillor
2004	Dilriaz Butt (Con)	Bernard Sharp (Con)	Ian Mullins (Con)
2006	Dilriaz Butt (Con)	Bernard Sharp (Con)	Ian Mullins (Con)
2007	Dilriaz Butt (Con)	Bernard Sharp (Con)	Ian Mullins (Con)
2008	Dilriaz Butt (Con)	Bernard Sharp (Con)	Patrick Myers (Con)
2010	Dylan Butt (Con)	Bernard Sharp (Con)	Patrick Myers (Con)
2011	Dylan Butt (Con)	Bernard Sharp (Con)	Patrick Myers (Con)
2012	Dylan Butt (Con)	Bernard Sharp (Con)	Patrick Myers (Con)
2014	Dylan Butt (Con)	Bernard Sharp (Con)	Patrick Myers (Con)
2015	Dylan Butt (Con)	Bernard Sharp (Con)	Patrick Myers (Con)
2016	Dylan Butt (Con)	Bernard Sharp (Con)	Patrick Myers (Con)
2018	Dylan Butt (Con)	Bernard Sharp (Con)	Patrick Myers (Con)
2019	Dylan Butt (Con)	Dave Morgan (Con)	Patrick Myers (Con)
2021	Dylan Butt (Con)	Dave Morgan (Con)	Patrick Myers (Con)
2022	Dylan Butt (Con)	Dave Morgan (Con)	Patrick Myers (Con)

indicates seat up for re-election.

== Elections in the 2020s ==
=== May 2022 ===
2022
Party	Candidate	Votes	%	±%
Conservative	Dylan Butt*	1,676	58.9	
Labour	Barbara Twiney	657	23.1	
Liberal Democrats	Simon Lepori	254	8.9	
Green	David Schorah	247	8.7	
Majority		1,019	35.8	
Registered electors		7,421		
Turnout		2,846	38.4	
Conservative hold		Swing		

=== May 2021 ===
2021
Party	Candidate	Votes	%	±%
Conservative	Patrick Myers*	2,008	61.5	▼8.2
Labour Co-op	Barbara Twiney	671	20.5	▲3.0
Green	David Schorah	337	10.3	▲5.5
Liberal Democrats	Simon Lepori	231	7.1	▼0.6
Majority		1,337	40.9	▼11.4
Rejected ballots		20		
Registered electors		7,503		
Turnout		3,267	43.5	▲3.1
Conservative hold		Swing	▼5.6	

== Elections in the 2010s ==
=== May 2019 ===
2019
Party	Candidate	Votes	%	±%
Conservative	Dave Morgan	1,613	57.5	▼9.4
Labour Co-op	Barbara Twiney	378	13.5	▼3.0
Liberal Democrats	Maggie Boysen	313	11.1	▲2.2
Green	Jessica Hession	196	6.9	▲3.6
Independent	Sandra Taylor	164	5.8	▲1.1
UKIP	Ian Royle	144	5.1	N/A
Majority		1,195	42.5	▼7.8
Registered electors		7,362		
Turnout		2,808	38.26	▼0.74
Conservative hold		Swing		

=== May 2018 ===
2018
Party	Candidate	Votes	%	±%
Conservative	Dylan Butt*	1,932	66.8	−3.1
Labour	Akilah Akinola	477	16.5	−1.0
Liberal Democrats	Maggie Boysen	258	8.9	+1.2
Independent	Sandra Taylor	132	4.6	+4.6
Green	Deborah Leftwich	95	3.3	−1.6
Majority		1,455	50.3	
Turnout		2,894	39.0	−1.4
Conservative hold		Swing		

=== May 2016 ===
2016
Party	Candidate	Votes	%	±%
Conservative	Patrick Myers*	2,030	69.7	+2.1
Labour Co-op	Barbara Twiney	509	17.5	+1.0
Liberal Democrats	Richard Elliot	225	7.7	−1.7
Green	Deborah Leftwich	141	4.8	−1.4
Majority		1,521	52.3	+1.1
Turnout		2,911	40.4	−30.2
Conservative hold		Swing		

=== May 2015 ===
2015
Party	Candidate	Votes	%	±%
Conservative	Bernard Sharp*	3,499	67.8	+3.6
Labour Co-op	Barbara Twiney	851	16.5	+3.2
Liberal Democrats	Sandra Taylor	484	9.4	+2.6
Green	Rozina Chaudry	325	6.3	+1.8
Majority		2,648	51.3	+0.4
Turnout		5,159	70.6	+23.8
Conservative hold		Swing		

=== May 2014 ===
2014
Party	Candidate	Votes	%	±%
Conservative	Dylan Butt*	1,911	64.2	+2.6
Labour Co-op	Barbara Twiney	395	13.3	−2.2
UKIP	Andrew Weighell	335	11.2	+3.6
Liberal Democrats	Sandra Taylor	204	6.8	−2.3
Green	Daniel Jerome	133	4.5	−0.5
Majority		1,516	50.9	+3.6
Turnout		2,978	40.8	+3.6
Conservative hold		Swing		

=== May 2012 ===
2012
Party	Candidate	Votes	%	±%
Conservative	Patrick Myers*	1,774	62.8	−5.7
Labour Co-op	Barbara Twiney	438	15.5	+0.1
Liberal Democrats	Sandra Taylor	256	9.1	−1.9
UKIP	Andrew Weighell	214	7.6	+7.6
Green	Sarah McIlroy	142	5.0	−0.1
Majority		1,336	47.3	−5.8
Turnout		2,824	38.7	−8.1
Conservative hold		Swing		

=== May 2011 ===
2011
Party	Candidate	Votes	%	±%
Conservative	Bernard Sharp*	2,439	68.5	+7.0
Labour Co-op	Barbara Twiney	549	15.4	+3.0
Liberal Democrats	Barbara Doyle	391	11.0	−12.3
Green	Sarah McIlroy	180	5.1	+2.3
Majority		1,890	53.1	+14.9
Turnout		3,559	46.8	−22.9
Conservative hold		Swing		

=== May 2010 ===
2010
Party	Candidate	Votes	%	±%
Conservative	Dylan Butt*	3,279	61.5	−10.7
Liberal Democrats	Sandra Taylor	1,240	23.3	+9.1
Labour	Joyce Acton	663	12.4	+2.9
Green	Sarah McIlroy	150	2.8	−1.3
Majority		2,039	38.2	−21.8
Turnout		5,332	69.7	+29.4
Conservative hold		Swing		

== Elections in the 2000s ==
=== May 2008 ===
2008
Party	Candidate	Votes	%	±%
Conservative	Patrick Myers	2,216	72.2	+2.4
Liberal Democrats	Sandra Taylor	437	14.2	−2.2
Labour	Emily Spurrell	290	9.5	+0.4
Green	Andrew Gratton	125	4.1	−0.6
Majority		1,779	60.0	+6.6
Turnout		3,068	40.3	−1.9
Conservative hold		Swing		

=== May 2007 ===
2007
Party	Candidate	Votes	%	±%
Conservative	Bernard Sharp*	2,177	69.8	−1.3
Liberal Democrats	Sandra Taylor	511	16.4	−2.2
Labour	Andrew Western	284	9.1	−1.3
Green	Jane Smith	148	4.7	+4.7
Majority		1,666	53.4	+0.9
Turnout		3,120	42.2	+3.0
Conservative hold		Swing		

=== May 2006 ===
2006
Party	Candidate	Votes	%	±%
Conservative	Dilriaz Butt*	2,061	71.1	−9.8
Liberal Democrats	Richard Elliott	538	18.6	−0.5
Labour	Moira Lythgoe	301	10.4	+10.4
Majority		1,523	52.5	+39.7
Turnout		2,900	39.2	−14.6
Conservative hold		Swing		

=== June 2004 ===
2004 (after boundary changes)
Party	Candidate	Votes	%	±%
Conservative	Ian Mullins*	2,515	30.6	
Conservative	Bernard Sharp	2,223	27.0	
Conservative	Dilriaz Butt	1,917	23.3	
Liberal Democrats	Barry Hepburn*	1,567	19.1	
Turnout		8,222	53.8	
Conservative win (new seat)				
Conservative win (new seat)				
Conservative win (new seat)				
