= Sean Anstee =

English politician (born 1987)

Sean Anstee CBE
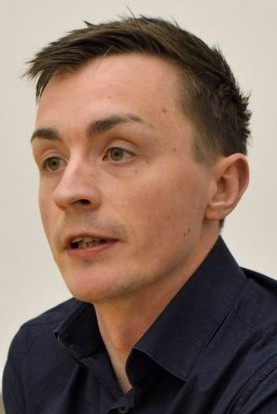
- Anstee speaking as the Leader of Trafford Council in 2017

Director of Operations of the Devon and Torbay Combined County Authority
- Incumbent
- Assumed office 2025
- Preceded by: Position established

Leader of Trafford Council
- In office 2014–2018
- Preceded by: Matthew Colledge
- Succeeded by: Andrew Western

Personal details
- Born: Sean Brian Anstee; July 1987 (age 39) Partington, England
- Party: Conservative
- Education: Manchester Metropolitan University
- Occupation: Politician; businessman

Sean Brian Anstee CBE (born July 1987) is an English Conservative Party politician and businessman. He has been the Director of Operations for the Devon and Torbay Combined County Authority since February 2025. He is Deputy Chair of Manchester Metropolitan University and was formerly the Leader of the Council on Trafford Council and between 2008 and 2021 was a Councillor for the Bowdon ward. He is a former Chairman of Trafford Housing Trust and Non-Executive Director of London & Quadrant. He was appointed a CBE in the 2019 New Year Honours list for services to local government.

He stood as the Conservative candidate for Mayor of Greater Manchester in the 2017 election, achieving 128,752 votes (22.7%) and coming second behind Labour's Andy Burnham. Anstee's official campaign video highlighted his Greater Manchester roots, proudly declaring he was "from here, for here". The slogan aimed to contrast Anstee's local status with Burnham's Liverpool heritage.

Anstee grew up on a council estate in Partington, and attended Broadoak School, leaving aged 16 to take up an apprenticeship at Barclays in Timperley. He joined BNY Mellon in 2009. He later graduated from Manchester Metropolitan University in 2013 with a degree in business. He represented Bowdon on the council from 2008 to 2021 when he retired. He became leader of the council in February 2014. At age 26, he was the youngest council leader in the UK.

Anstee was appointed as Director of Operations for Devon and Torbay Combined County Authority when the authority was established in February 2025.
