= Trafford Housing Trust =

Housing association in Trafford, Greater Manchester, England

Trafford Housing Trust was a housing association based in Trafford. It was acquired by L&Q in 2019. It owned and managed about 9,000 properties. It also provided care and support for disabled people and ran sheltered housing and extra-care homes. It owned Laurus Homes, which still builds affordable homes for sale. It was created by a transfer of housing stock from Trafford Council in 2005.

== Commercial details ==
Matthew Gardiner is the chief executive. Turnover for 2016/7 was £54.4 million, with an operating surplus of £12.4 million. In 2017 it completed a refinancing package of £275 million from Lloyds Bank, BlackRock, the Pension Insurance Corporation and the Yorkshire Building Society. It also has funding from the Greater Manchester Housing Investment Fund.

It has set up a joint venture with Galliford Try to build homes in Partington next to Carrington Moss. About 500 will be sold and 74 will be available for shared ownership or affordable rent.

In 2019, L&Q acquired THT.

== Community work ==
It set up the award-winning Limelight centre in Old Trafford in 2017.

In 2018 it was part of a scheme with Great Places Housing Group, Trafford Council, and Irwell Valley Homes to turn unoccupied office space into night shelters for homeless people and donated £5,000 for essential items.
