= Hale Central =

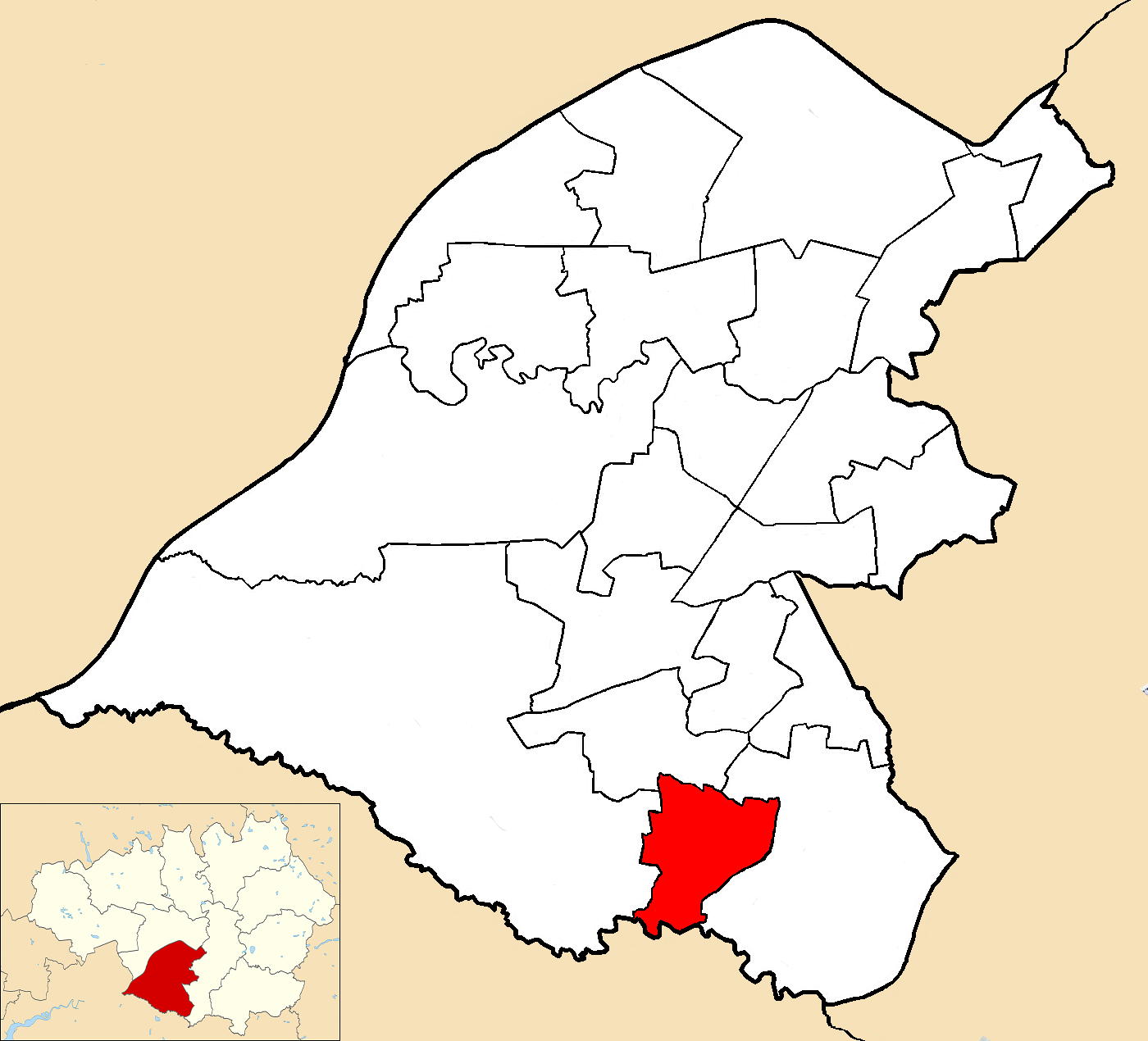
- Hale Central within Trafford
- Population: 10,543
- Metropolitan borough: Trafford
- Metropolitan county: Greater Manchester
- Country: England
- Sovereign state: United Kingdom
- UK Parliament: Altrincham and Sale West
- Councillors: Jane Leicester (Green); Patricia Young (Conservative); Daniel Chalkin (Conservative)

Hale Central was an electoral ward of Trafford covering most of the village of Hale and a small part of Altrincham Town Centre.

The ward was created in 2004 largely from the Hale and Bowdon wards, as well as parts of Altrincham and Timperley.

== Councillors ==
As of 2022, the councillors are Jane Leicester (Green), Patricia Young (Conservative), and Daniel Chalkin (Conservative).

Election	Councillor	Councillor	Councillor
2004	Alan Mitchell (Con)	Patricia Young (Con)	Colin Foster (Con)
2006	Alan Mitchell (Con)	Patricia Young (Con)	Colin Foster (Con)
2007	Alan Mitchell (Con)	Patricia Young (Con)	Colin Foster (Con)
2008	Alan Mitchell (Con)	Patricia Young (Con)	Chris Candish (Con)
2010	Alan Mitchell (Con)	Patricia Young (Con)	Chris Candish (Con)
2011	Alan Mitchell (Con)	Patricia Young (Con)	Chris Candish (Con)
2012	Alan Mitchell (Con)	Patricia Young (Con)	Chris Candish (Con)
2014	Alan Mitchell (Con)	Patricia Young (Con)	Chris Candish (Con)
2015	Alan Mitchell (Con)	Patricia Young (Con)	Chris Candish (Con)
2016	Alan Mitchell (Con)	Patricia Young (Con)	Denise Haddad (Con)
2018	Alan Mitchell (Con)	Patricia Young (Con)	Denise Haddad (Con)
2019	Alan Mitchell (Con)	Patricia Young (Con)	Denise Haddad (Con)
2021	Alan Mitchell (Con)	Patricia Young (Con)	Daniel Chalkin (Con)
2022	Jane Leicester (Green)	Patricia Young (Con)	Daniel Chalkin (Con)

indicates seat up for re-election.

== Elections in the 2020s ==
=== May 2022 ===
2022
Party	Candidate	Votes	%	±%
Green	Jane Leicester	1,776	50.0	▲37.8
Conservative	John Brodie	1,255	35.3	▼18.3
Labour	Charles Mayer	324	9.1	▼17.9
Liberal Democrats	Marc Ramsbottom	200	5.6	▼6.6
Majority		521	14.5	−12.1
Rejected ballots		10		
Registered electors		7,429		
Turnout		3,565	48.0	+7.7
Green gain from Conservative		Swing		

=== May 2021 ===
2021
Party	Candidate	Votes	%	±%
Conservative	Daniel Chalkin	1,499	37.7	▼20.2
Green	Jane Leicester	1,307	32.9	▲25.7
Liberal Democrats	Will Frass	737	18.5	▲8.5
Labour	Stephen Little	415	10.4	▼14.1
Majority		192	4.8	▼28.6
Turnout		3,978	53.1	▲14.4
Conservative hold		Swing	▼23.0	

== Elections in the 2010s ==
=== May 2019 ===
2019
Party	Candidate	Votes	%	±%
Conservative	Patricia Young*	1,430	48.1	−5.5
Liberal Democrats	Will Frass	555	18.7	+6.5
Green	Stephen Leicester	512	17.2	+11.7
Labour	Benjamin Slater	447	15.0	−12.0
Majority		875	29.4	+2.8
Turnout		2,973	40.2	−0.09
Conservative hold		Swing		

=== May 2018 ===
2018
Party	Candidate	Votes	%	±%
Conservative	Alan Mitchell*	1,604	53.6	−4.5
Labour	Jill Axford	809	27.0	+2.4
Liberal Democrats	Will Frass	364	12.2	+2.2
Green	Stephen Leicester	166	5.5	−1.7
Liberal	Wayne Harrison	49	1.6	+1.6
Majority		795	26.6	−7.9
Turnout		2,992	40.3	+1.6
Conservative hold		Swing		

=== May 2016 ===
2016
Party	Candidate	Votes	%	±%
Conservative	Denise Haddad	1,614	57.9	−4.0
Labour Co-op	Beverley Harrison	683	24.5	+4.0
Liberal Democrats	Wayne Harrison	278	10.0	+1.5
Green	Giulio Forcolin	201	7.2	−1.6
Majority		931	33.4	−8.0
Turnout		2,788	38.7	−34.8
Conservative hold		Swing		

=== May 2015 ===
2015
Party	Candidate	Votes	%	±%
Conservative	Patricia Young*	3,394	62.1	+3.1
Labour Co-op	Beverley Harrison	1,126	20.6	−1.1
Green	Samuel Little	482	8.8	−0.7
Liberal Democrats	Kirsty Cullen	463	8.5	−1.3
Majority		2,268	41.5	+4.2
Turnout		5,465	73.5	+27.6
Conservative hold		Swing		

=== May 2014 ===
2014
Party	Candidate	Votes	%	±%
Conservative	Alan Mitchell*	1,646	57.9	−0.2
Labour Co-op	Beverley Harrison	647	22.7	0.4
Green	Samuel Little	325	11.4	−0.5
Liberal Democrats	Craig Birtwistle	221	7.7	0.1
Majority		999	35.2	−0.6
Turnout		2839	38.7	3.8
Conservative hold		Swing		

=== May 2012 ===
2012
Party	Candidate	Votes	%	±%
Conservative	Chris Candish*	1,484	58.1	−0.9
Labour Co-op	Beverley Harrison	569	22.3	+0.6
Green	Samuel Little	303	11.9	+2.4
Liberal Democrats	Craig Birtwistle	200	7.8	−2.0
Majority		915	35.8	−1.5
Turnout		2,556	34.9	−11.0
Conservative hold		Swing		

=== May 2011 ===
2011
Party	Candidate	Votes	%	±%
Conservative	Patricia Young*	2,040	59.0	+4.1
Labour Co-op	Beverley Harrison	751	21.7	+4.7
Liberal Democrats	Julian Newgrosh	339	9.8	−12.3
Green	Samuel Little	327	9.5	+3.4
Majority		1,289	37.3	+4.5
Turnout		3,457	45.9	−25.9
Conservative hold		Swing		

=== May 2010 ===
2010
Party	Candidate	Votes	%	±%
Conservative	Alan Mitchell*	2,961	54.9	−11.4
Liberal Democrats	Julian Newgrosh	1,191	22.1	+10.1
Labour	Gwyneth Brock	915	17.0	+3.5
Green	Sam Little	328	6.1	−2.1
Majority		1,770	32.8	−20.0
Turnout		5,395	71.8	+33.7
Conservative hold		Swing		

== Elections in the 2000s ==
=== May 2008 ===
2008
Party	Candidate	Votes	%	±%
Conservative	Chris Candish	1,861	66.3	+3.1
Labour	Beverly Harrison	379	13.5	−0.3
Liberal Democrats	Pauline Cliff	338	12.0	+1.6
Green	Sarah McIlroy	231	8.2	−4.5
Majority		1,482	52.8	+3.4
Turnout		2,809	38.1	−2.4
Conservative gain from Independent		Swing		

=== May 2007 ===
2007
Party	Candidate	Votes	%	±%
Conservative	Patricia Young*	1,813	63.2	+2.2
Labour	Beverly Harrison	395	13.8	+1.3
Green	Samuel Little	364	12.7	+1.7
Liberal Democrats	Armaan Chohan	299	10.4	−5.1
Majority		1,418	49.4	+3.9
Turnout		2,871	40.5	+1.9
Conservative hold		Swing		

=== May 2006 ===
2006
Party	Candidate	Votes	%	±%
Conservative	Alan Mitchell*	1,641	61.0	−14.5
Liberal Democrats	Michael Mills	418	15.5	+2.3
Labour	Beverly Harrison	335	12.5	+1.3
Green	Samuel Little	295	11.0	+11.0
Majority		1,223	45.5	+12.3
Turnout		2,689	38.6	−13.0
Conservative hold		Swing		

=== May 2004 ===
2004 (after boundary changes)
Party	Candidate	Votes	%	±%
Conservative	Colin Foster	2,069	26.3	
Conservative	Patricia Young	1,967	25.0	
Conservative	Alan Mitchell	1,912	24.2	
Liberal Democrats	Richard Elliott	1,042	13.2	
Labour	Beverly Harrison	880	11.2	
Turnout		7,870	51.6	
Conservative win (new seat)				
Conservative win (new seat)				
Conservative win (new seat)				
