= 2018 Trafford Metropolitan Borough Council election =

2018 local election in England

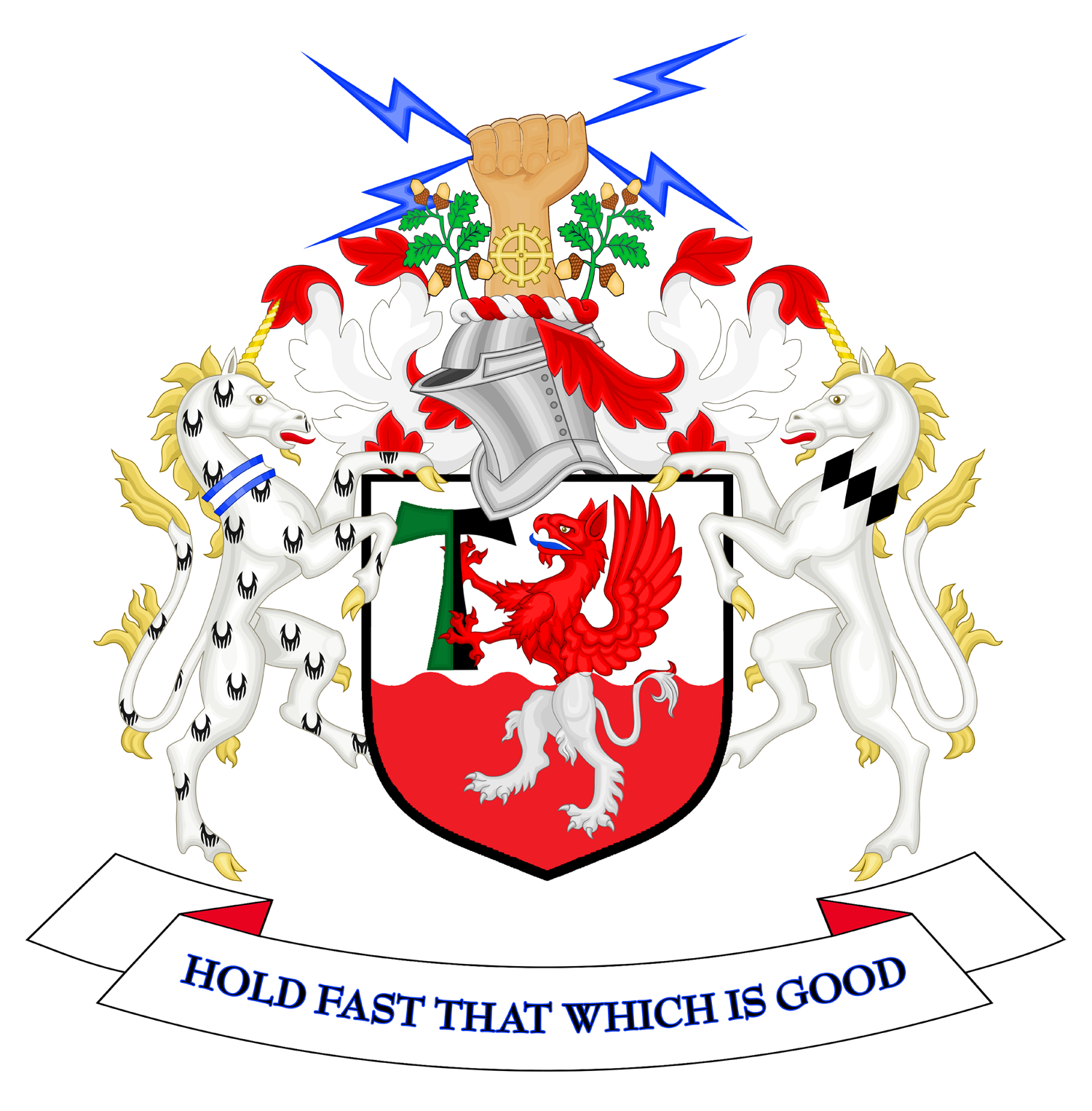
| ← 2016 | 3 May 2018 | 2019 → |

22 of 63 seats to Trafford Metropolitan Borough Council 32 seats needed for a majority
| | First party | Second party | Third party |
|---|---|---|---|
| Leader | Andrew Western | Sean Anstee | Ray Bowker |
| Party | Labour | Conservative | Liberal Democrats |
| Leader's seat | Priory | Bowdon | Village |
| Last election | 9 seats, 40.0% | 10 seats, 39.3% | 2 seats, 9.6% |
| Seats before | 26 | 34 | 3 |
| Seats won | 13 | 7 | 0 |
| Seats after | 30 | 29 | 2 |
| Seat change | ▲4 | ▼5 | ▼1 |
| Popular vote | 34,523 | 26,884 | 5,318 |
| Percentage | 47.2% | 36.8% | 7.3% |
| Swing | ▲7.2% | ▼2.5% | ▼2.3% |
| | Fourth party |
| Leader | Geraldine Coggins |
| Party | Green |
| Leader's seat | Altrincham |
| Last election | 0 seats, 6.4% |
| Seats before | 0 |
| Seats won | 2 |
| Seats after | 2 |
| Seat change | ▲2 |
| Popular vote | 4,817 |
| Percentage | 6.6% |
| Swing | ▲0.2% |
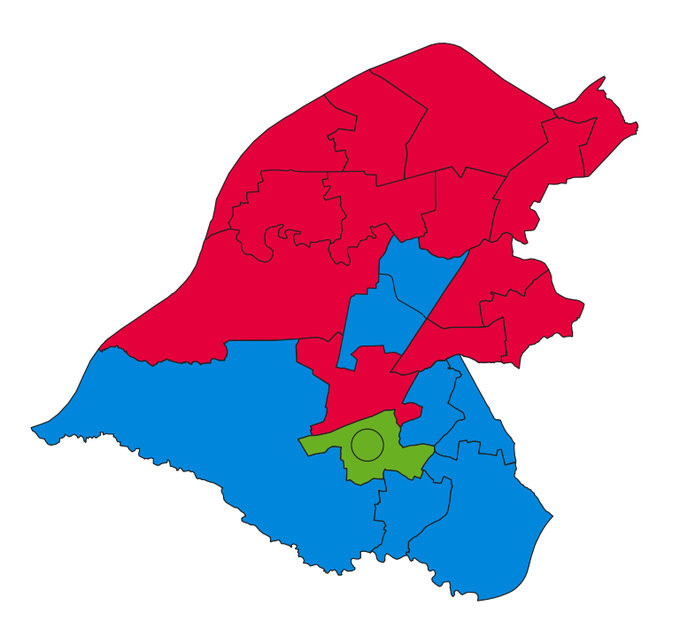
- Map of results of 2018 election
Leader of the Council before election
Sean Anstee
Conservative
Leader of the Council after election
Andrew Western
Labour

The 2018 Trafford Metropolitan Borough Council election to elect members of Trafford Metropolitan Borough Council in England took place on 3 May 2018. This was on the same day as other local elections.

One third of the council stood for election, with each successful candidate serving a four-year term of office, expiring in 2022. The Conservative Party held overall control of the council going into the election but lost 5 seats, with Labour holding the larger number of councillors, meaning the council entered a state of no overall control.

== Election result ==
| Party | Votes | | Seats | | | Full Council | |
| Labour Party | 34,523 (47.2%) | ▲7.2 | 13 (59.1%) | 13 / 22 | ▲4 | 30 (47.6%) | 30 / 63 |
| Conservative Party | 26,884 (36.8%) | ▼2.5 | 7 (31.8%) | 7 / 22 | ▼5 | 29 (46.0%) | 29 / 63 |
| Liberal Democrats | 5,318 (7.3%) | ▼2.3 | 0 (0.0%) | 0 / 22 | ▼1 | 2 (3.2%) | 2 / 63 |
| Green Party | 4,817 (6.6%) | ▲0.2 | 2 (9.1%) | 2 / 22 | ▲2 | 2 (3.2%) | 2 / 63 |
| UKIP | 1,011 (1.4%) | ▼2.3 | 0 (0.0%) | 0 / 22 | Steady | 0 (0.0%) | 0 / 63 |
| Liberal Party | 391 (0.5%) | N/A | 0 (0.0%) | 0 / 22 | N/A | 0 (0.0%) | 0 / 63 |
| Independent | 165 (0.2%) | ▼0.7 | 0 (0.0%) | 0 / 22 | Steady | 0 (0.0%) | 0 / 63 |

↓
| 30 | 2 | 2 | 29 |

(Note: % of total refers to % of wards won.)

== Ward results ==
=== Altrincham ward ===
Altrincham (2)
| Party | Candidate | Votes | % | ±% |
|---|---|---|---|---|
| Green | Daniel Jerrome (Note: Elected to serve a 4-year term.) | 1,944 | 47.1 | ▲23.4 |
| Green | Geraldine Coggins (Note: Elected to serve a 2-year term.) | 1,621 | 39.3 | ▲15.6 |
| Conservative | Constantine Biller | 1,386 | 33.6 | ▼13.1 |
| Conservative | Angela Stone | 1,342 | 32.5 | ▼14.2 |
| Labour | Stephane Savary | 846 | 20.5 | ▼2.8 |
| Labour | Barry Winstanley | 655 | 15.9 | ▼7.4 |
| Liberal Democrats | Julian Newgrosh | 118 | 2.9 | ▼3.3 |
| Liberal Democrats | David Martin | 93 | 2.3 | ▼3.9 |
| Majority | | 558 | 13.0 | N/A |
| Registered electors | | 8,892 | | |
| Turnout | | | 46.5 | ▲7.7 |
| Green gain from Conservative | | Swing | ▲18.0 | |
| Green gain from Conservative | | Swing | – | |

=== Ashton upon Mersey ward ===
Ashton upon Mersey
| Party | Candidate | Votes | % | ±% |
|---|---|---|---|---|
| Conservative | John Lamb* | 1,677 | 46.8 | ▼6.1 |
| Labour | Ben Hartley | 1,568 | 43.8 | ▲9.0 |
| Green | Caroline Robertson-Brown | 148 | 4.1 | ▼3.3 |
| Liberal Democrats | Stephen Power | 138 | 3.9 | ▼1.0 |
| UKIP | Kevin Grime | 53 | 1.5 | New |
| Majority | | 109 | 3.0 | ▼15.1 |
| Registered electors | | 7,617 | | |
| Turnout | | 3,584 | 47.1 | ▲4.2 |
| Conservative hold | | Swing | ▼7.6 | |

=== Bowdon ward ===
Bowdon
| Party | Candidate | Votes | % | ±% |
|---|---|---|---|---|
| Conservative | Karen Barclay* | 2,130 | 68.4 | ▼2.6 |
| Labour | Waseem Hassan | 422 | 13.5 | ▼1.8 |
| Liberal Democrats | Ludo Tolhurst-Cleaver | 356 | 11.4 | ▲3.4 |
| Green | Nigel Hennerley | 169 | 5.4 | ▼0.3 |
| UKIP | Jim Cook | 39 | 1.3 | ▲1.3 |
| Majority | | 1,708 | 54.9 | ▼0.8 |
| Registered electors | | 7,335 | | |
| Turnout | | 3,116 | 42.5 | ▲1.2 |
| Conservative hold | | Swing | ▼0.4 | |

=== Broadheath ward ===
Broadheath
| Party | Candidate | Votes | % | ±% |
|---|---|---|---|---|
| Labour | Amy Whyte* | 2,077 | 49.3 | +3.3 |
| Conservative | Kate Burke | 1,716 | 40.7 | −0.2 |
| Liberal Democrats | Chris Marriott | 170 | 4.0 | −2.2 |
| Green | Daniel Gresty | 160 | 3.8 | +2.0 |
| UKIP | Mike Bayley-Sanderson | 56 | 1.3 | −0.8 |
| Independent | Stephen Farndon | 33 | 0.8 | 0 |
| Majority | | 361 | 8.6 | +1.5 |
| Turnout | | 4,212 | 42.6 | −1.7 |
| Labour hold | | Swing | | |

=== Brooklands ward ===
Brooklands
| Party | Candidate | Votes | % | ±% |
|---|---|---|---|---|
| Labour | Steven Longden | 1,939 | 47.6 | +10.8 |
| Conservative | Mike Jefferson | 1,755 | 43.1 | −8.7 |
| Liberal Democrats | Meenakshi Minnis | 170 | 4.2 | −4.2 |
| Green | Mandy King | 155 | 3.8 | +0.9 |
| UKIP | Tony Nayler | 55 | 1.4 | +1.4 |
| Majority | | 184 | 4.5 | |
| Turnout | | 4,074 | 52.0 | +7.8 |
| Labour gain from Conservative | | Swing | | |

=== Bucklow-St. Martins ward ===
Bucklow-St. Martins
| Party | Candidate | Votes | % | ±% |
|---|---|---|---|---|
| Labour | Adele New | 1,427 | 70.5 | +5.8 |
| Conservative | Geoffrey Turner | 424 | 21.0 | −7.1 |
| UKIP | Norine Napier | 90 | 4.4 | +0.4 |
| Green | Rodrigo Capucho Paulo | 44 | 2.2 | +0.2 |
| Liberal Democrats | Simon Wright | 38 | 1.9 | +0.8 |
| Majority | | 1,003 | 49.6 | +13.9 |
| Turnout | | 2,023 | 28.5 | +6.5 |
| Labour hold | | Swing | | |

=== Clifford ward ===
Clifford
| Party | Candidate | Votes | % | ±% |
|---|---|---|---|---|
| Labour | Sophie Taylor* | 2,702 | 84.3 | +4.7 |
| Green | Jess Mayo | 255 | 8.0 | −3.8 |
| Conservative | Alex Finney | 165 | 5.1 | −1.4 |
| Liberal Democrats | Pauline Cliff | 82 | 2.6 | +0.5 |
| Majority | | 2,447 | 76.4 | +8.6 |
| Turnout | | 3,204 | 39.3 | −1.0 |
| Labour hold | | Swing | | |

=== Davyhulme East ward ===
Davyhulme East
| Party | Candidate | Votes | % | ±% |
|---|---|---|---|---|
| Labour | Jayne Dillon | 2,205 | 57.5 | +19.7 |
| Conservative | Mike Cornes* | 1,388 | 36.2 | −9.0 |
| Green | Steven Tennant-Smythe | 100 | 2.6 | −1.5 |
| Liberal Democrats | Sue Sutherland | 73 | 1.9 | −0.6 |
| UKIP | Gary Regan | 69 | 1.8 | −8.6 |
| Majority | | 817 | 21.3 | |
| Turnout | | 3,835 | 49.5 | +7.6 |
| Labour gain from Conservative | | Swing | | |

=== Davyhulme West ward ===
Davyhulme West
| Party | Candidate | Votes | % | ±% |
|---|---|---|---|---|
| Labour | Graham Whitham | 2,230 | 57.5 | +23.3 |
| Conservative | Christine Turner | 1,403 | 36.2 | −11.7 |
| UKIP | Paul Regan | 96 | 2.6 | −10.1 |
| Liberal Democrats | David Kierman | 81 | 2.2 | +0.2 |
| Green | Rob Raikes | 71 | 1.9 | −1.3 |
| Majority | | 827 | 21.3 | |
| Turnout | | 3,881 | 50.5 | +9.4 |
| Labour gain from Conservative | | Swing | | |

=== Flixton ward ===
Flixton
| Party | Candidate | Votes | % | ±% |
|---|---|---|---|---|
| Labour | Simon Thomas | 2,732 | 59.9 | +20.1 |
| Conservative | Viv Ward* | 1,528 | 33.5 | −7.9 |
| Green | Christine McLaughlin | 125 | 2.7 | −1.7 |
| UKIP | Andrew Beaumont | 91 | 2.0 | −9.9 |
| Liberal Democrats | Ian Sutherland | 84 | 1.8 | −0.7 |
| Majority | | 1,204 | 26.4 | +24.7 |
| Turnout | | 4,560 | 55.0 | +10.9 |
| Labour gain from Conservative | | Swing | | |

=== Gorse Hill ward ===
Gorse Hill
| Party | Candidate | Votes | % | ±% |
|---|---|---|---|---|
| Labour | David Acton* | 2,039 | 73.0 | +7.1 |
| Conservative | Lijo John | 485 | 17.4 | +0.9 |
| Green | Joe Ryan | 115 | 4.1 | −1.4 |
| Liberal Democrats | Dawn Carberry-Power | 88 | 3.2 | +0.8 |
| UKIP | Seamus Martin | 66 | 2.4 | −7.4 |
| Majority | | 1,554 | 55.6 | |
| Turnout | | 2,793 | 33.5 | −1.0 |
| Labour hold | | Swing | | |

=== Hale Barns ward ===
Hale Barns
| Party | Candidate | Votes | % | ±% |
|---|---|---|---|---|
| Conservative | Dylan Butt* | 1,932 | 66.8 | −3.1 |
| Labour | Akilah Akinola | 477 | 16.5 | −1.0 |
| Liberal Democrats | Maggie Boysen | 258 | 8.9 | +1.2 |
| Independent | Sandra Taylor | 132 | 4.6 | +4.6 |
| Green | Deborah Leftwich | 95 | 3.3 | −1.6 |
| Majority | | 1,455 | 50.3 | |
| Turnout | | 2,894 | 39.0 | −1.4 |
| Conservative hold | | Swing | | |

=== Hale Central ward ===
Hale Central
| Party | Candidate | Votes | % | ±% |
|---|---|---|---|---|
| Conservative | Alan Mitchell* | 1,604 | 53.6 | −4.5 |
| Labour | Jill Axford | 809 | 27.0 | +2.4 |
| Liberal Democrats | Will Frass | 364 | 12.2 | +2.2 |
| Green | Stephen Leicester | 166 | 5.5 | −1.7 |
| Liberal | Wayne Harrison | 49 | 1.6 | +1.6 |
| Majority | | 795 | 26.6 | |
| Turnout | | 2,992 | 40.3 | +1.6 |
| Conservative hold | | Swing | | |

=== Longford ward ===
Longford
| Party | Candidate | Votes | % | ±% |
|---|---|---|---|---|
| Labour | David Jarman* | 2,611 | 71.5 | +3.6 |
| Conservative | Cathy Conchie | 547 | 15.0 | +0.7 |
| Green | Margaret Westbrook | 238 | 6.5 | −2.7 |
| Liberal Democrats | Anna Fryer | 194 | 5.3 | +3.0 |
| UKIP | Pauline Royle | 60 | 1.6 | −4.7 |
| Majority | | 2,064 | 56.5 | |
| Turnout | | 3,650 | 40.1 | 0 |
| Labour hold | | Swing | | |

=== Priory ward ===
Priory
| Party | Candidate | Votes | % | ±% |
|---|---|---|---|---|
| Labour Co-op | Jane Baugh* | 2,018 | 60.3 | +5.3 |
| Conservative | George Barker | 988 | 29.5 | +2.9 |
| Green | Paul Greer | 170 | 5.1 | −0.1 |
| Liberal Democrats | Michael MacDonald | 170 | 5.1 | −0.5 |
| Majority | | 1,030 | 30.8 | |
| Turnout | | 3,346 | 40.9 | +1.0 |
| Labour Co-op hold | | Swing | | |

=== Sale Moor ward ===
Sale Moor
| Party | Candidate | Votes | % | ±% |
|---|---|---|---|---|
| Labour | Liz Patel | 1,433 | 51.7 | −4.0 |
| Conservative | Darren Christopher Meacher | 971 | 35.0 | +2.5 |
| Liberal Democrats | Czarina Kirk | 207 | 7.5 | +2.7 |
| Green | Jane Leicester | 161 | 5.8 | −1.1 |
| Majority | | 462 | 16.7 | |
| Turnout | | 2,772 | 36.4 | −1.6 |
| Labour hold | | Swing | | |

=== St. Mary's ward ===
St Mary's
| Party | Candidate | Votes | % | ±% |
|---|---|---|---|---|
| Conservative | Rob Chilton* | 2,053 | 60.0 | +2.3 |
| Labour | Mal Choudhury | 1,054 | 30.8 | −0.5 |
| Liberal Democrats | Louise Bird | 167 | 4.9 | +0.1 |
| Green | Nicholas Robertson-Brown | 149 | 4.4 | −1.7 |
| Majority | | 999 | 29.2 | +2.9 |
| Turnout | | 3,423 | 39.9 | +2.3 |
| Conservative hold | | Swing | | |

=== Stretford ward ===
Stretford
| Party | Candidate | Votes | % | ±% |
|---|---|---|---|---|
| Labour | Jane Slater | 2,231 | 71.5 | +4.9 |
| Conservative | Shengke Zhi | 490 | 15.7 | −6.1 |
| Green | Liz O'Neill | 211 | 6.8 | −1.5 |
| Liberal Democrats | Simon Lepori | 98 | 3.1 | −0.2 |
| UKIP | Ian Royle | 92 | 2.9 | +2.9 |
| Majority | | 1,741 | 55.8 | |
| Turnout | | 3,122 | 39.5 | −0.5 |
| Labour hold | | Swing | | |

=== Timperley ward ===
Timperley
| Party | Candidate | Votes | % | ±% |
|---|---|---|---|---|
| Conservative | Nathan Evans* | 1,694 | 40.4 | +7.1 |
| Liberal Democrats | William Jones | 1,329 | 31.7 | −20.4 |
| Labour | Julia Garlick | 718 | 17.1 | +6.7 |
| Liberal | Neil Taylor | 342 | 8.2 | +8.2 |
| Green | Jadwiga Leigh | 113 | 2.7 | −1.4 |
| Majority | | 365 | 8.7 | |
| Turnout | | 4,196 | 49.6 | −0.6 |
| Conservative hold | | Swing | | |

=== Urmston ward ===
Urmston
| Party | Candidate | Votes | % | ±% |
|---|---|---|---|---|
| Labour | Kevin Procter* | 2,243 | 57.8 | +9.9 |
| Conservative | Michelle McGrath | 1,217 | 31.3 | −5.8 |
| Green | Timothy Woodward | 155 | 4.0 | +0.2 |
| UKIP | Krissy Douglas | 138 | 3.6 | −5.3 |
| Liberal Democrats | Kirsty Cullen | 130 | 3.3 | +0.9 |
| Majority | | 1,026 | 26.5 | |
| Turnout | | 3,883 | 45.3 | −1.4 |
| Labour hold | | Swing | | |

=== Village ward ===
Village
| Party | Candidate | Votes | % | ±% |
|---|---|---|---|---|
| Conservative | Thomas Carey | 1,331 | 40.8 | +8.7 |
| Liberal Democrats | Tony Fishwick* | 1,003 | 30.8 | −14.5 |
| Labour | Tony O'Brien | 742 | 22.8 | +4.0 |
| UKIP | Angela O'Neill | 106 | 3.3 | +3.3 |
| Green | Matthew Westbrook | 78 | 2.4 | −1.4 |
| Majority | | 328 | 10.0 | |
| Turnout | | 3,260 | 41.2 | −2.2 |
| Conservative gain from Liberal Democrats | | Swing | | |
