= 2016 Trafford Metropolitan Borough Council election =

2016 local election in England

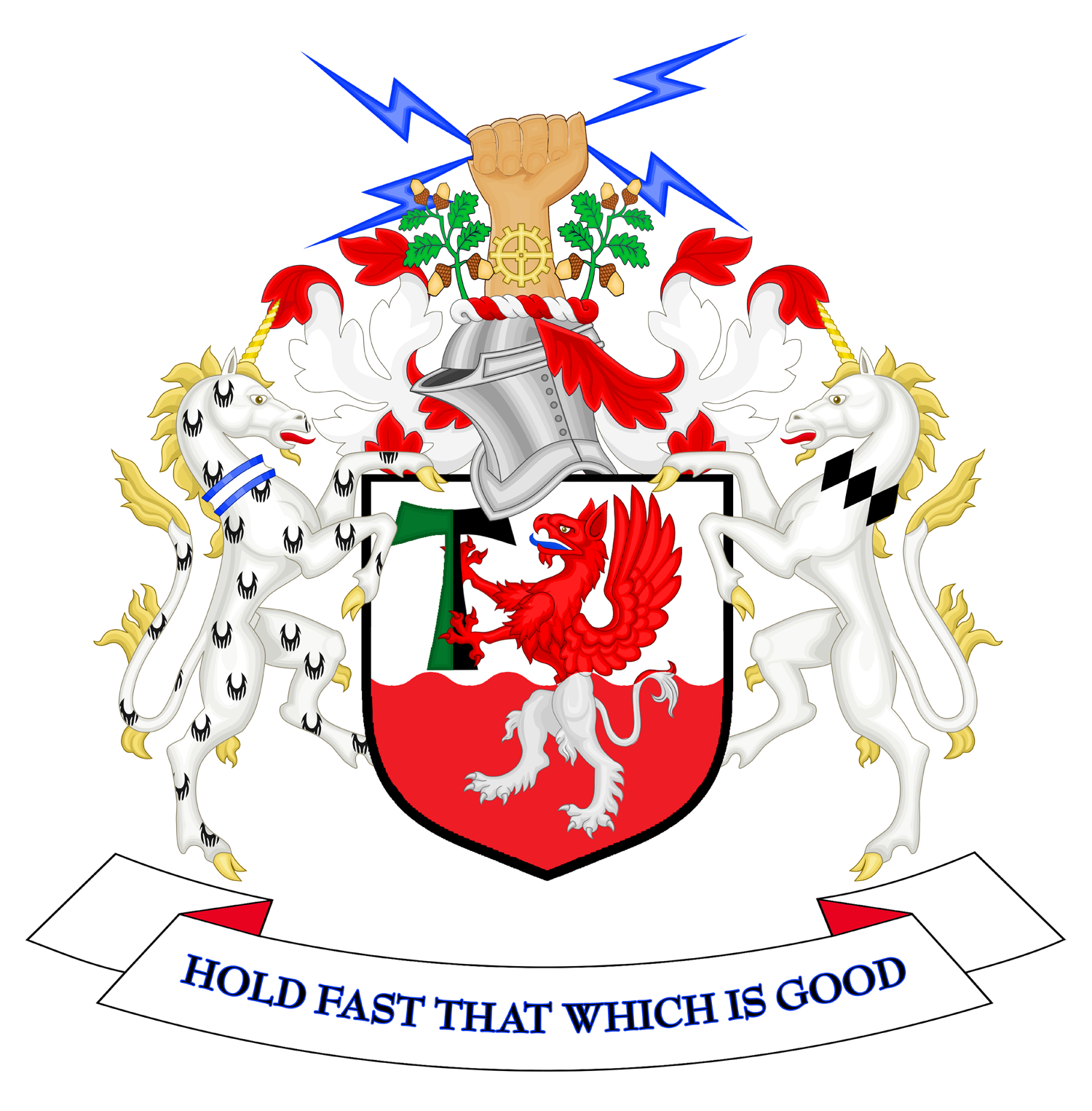
- 5 May 2016

21 of 63 seats to Trafford Metropolitan Borough Council 32 seats needed for a majority
	First party	Second party	Third party
Leader	Sean Anstee	Andrew Western	Ray Bowker
Party	Conservative	Labour	Liberal Democrats
Leader's seat	Bowdon	Priory	Village
Last election	12 seats, 44.0%	8 seats, 40.0%	0 seats, 6.9%
Seats before	34	26	3
Seats won	10	9	2
Seats after	34	26	3
Seat change	Steady	Steady	Steady
Popular vote	26,162	26,633	6,391
Percentage	39.3%	40.0%	9.6%
Swing	▼4.7%	Steady	▲2.7%
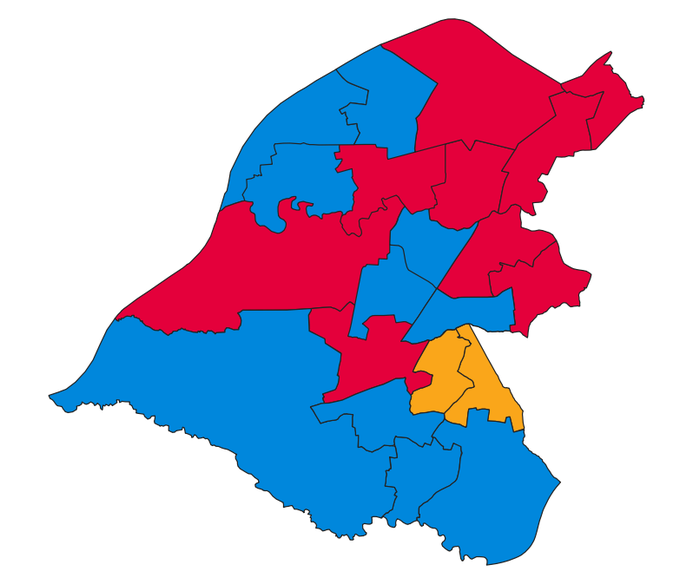
- Map of results of 2016 election
Leader of the Council before election
Sean Anstee
Conservative
Leader of the Council after election
Sean Anstee
Conservative

The 2016 Trafford Metropolitan Borough Council election took place on 5 May 2016 to elect members of Trafford Metropolitan Borough Council in England. This was on the same day as other local elections. One third of the council was up for election, with each successful candidate serving a four-year term of office, expiring in 2020. The Conservative Party held overall control of the council.

== Election result ==
Party	Votes		Seats			Full Council	
Conservative Party	26,162 (39.3%)	▼4.7	10 (47.6%)	10 / 21	Steady	34 (54.0%)	34 / 63
Labour Party	26,633 (40.0%)	Steady	9 (42.9%)	9 / 21	Steady	26 (41.3%)	26 / 63
Liberal Democrats	6,391 (9.6%)	▲2.7	2 (9.5%)	2 / 21	Steady	3 (4.8%)	3 / 63
Green Party	4,290 (6.4%)	▼1.7	0 (0.0%)	0 / 21	Steady	0 (0.0%)	0 / 63
UKIP	2,472 (3.7%)	▲2.6	0 (0.0%)	0 / 21	Steady	0 (0.0%)	0 / 63
Independent	622 (0.9%)	N/A	0 (0.0%)	0 / 21	N/A	0 (0.0%)	0 / 63

↓
26	3	34

== Ward results ==
=== Altrincham ward ===
Altrincham
Party	Candidate	Votes	%	±%
Conservative	Alexander Williams*	1,533	46.7	−6.8
Green	Daniel Jerrome	777	23.7	+11.7
Labour	Amy Whyte	763	23.3	−0.7
Liberal Democrats	Julian Newgrosh	207	6.3	−4.3
Majority		756	23.0	−6.5
Turnout		3,280	38.8	−28.0
Conservative hold		Swing		

=== Ashton upon Mersey ward ===
Ashton upon Mersey
Party	Candidate	Votes	%	±%
Conservative	Brian Rigby*	1,642	52.9	+1.5
Labour	Benjamin Hartley	1,079	34.8	+1.0
Green	Caroline Robertson-Brown	231	7.4	−1.5
Liberal Democrats	Christopher Marritt	151	4.9	1.1
Majority		563	18.1	+0.7
Turnout		3,103	42.9	−30.2
Conservative hold		Swing		

=== Bowdon ward ===
Bowdon
Party	Candidate	Votes	%	±%
Conservative	Sean Anstee*	2,090	71.0	+0.4
Labour	Charles Mayer	452	15.3	+0.6
Liberal Democrats	Kirstie Davidson	235	8.0	+0.9
Green	Daniel Wadsworth	168	5.7	−1.9
Majority		1,638	55.6	−0.2
Turnout		2,945	41.3	−30.7
Conservative hold		Swing		

=== Broadheath ward ===
Broadheath
Party	Candidate	Votes	%	±%
Labour	Denise Western*	1,877	47.2	+7.4
Conservative	Neil Ferguson	1,641	41.2	−7.8
Liberal Democrats	Pauline Cliff	204	5.1	−2.2
Green	Owain Sutton	152	3.8	0
Independent	Stephen Farndon	105	2.6	+2.6
Majority		236	5.9	−2.3
Turnout		3,979	41.8	−27.2
Labour hold		Swing		

=== Brooklands ward ===
Brooklands
Party	Candidate	Votes	%	±%
Conservative	Christopher Boyes*	1,766	51.8	−0.3
Labour	Serena Carr	1,256	36.8	+3.9
Liberal Democrats	Meenakshi Minnis	287	8.4	+0.1
Green	Joseph Ryan	100	2.9	−3.8
Majority		510	15.0	−4.2
Turnout		3,409	44.2	−27.6
Conservative hold		Swing		

=== Bucklow-St. Martins ward ===
Bucklow-St. Martins
Party	Candidate	Votes	%	±%
Labour	James Wright	835	38.4	−24.5
Independent	Anthony Rudden	517	23.8	+23.8
Conservative	Geoffrey Turner	371	17.1	−10.8
UKIP	Steven Jones	290	13.3	+13.3
Green	Thea Johnson	98	4.5	−4.7
Liberal Democrats	Graham Rogers	64	2.9	+2.9
Majority		318	14.6	−20.4
Turnout		2,175	32.7	−24.5
Labour hold		Swing		

=== Clifford ward ===
Clifford
Party	Candidate	Votes	%	±%
Labour	Eunice Whitfield Stennett*	2,374	79.6	+7.4
Green	Jessica Mayo	351	11.8	−6.3
Conservative	Alexander Finney	195	6.5	−3.2
Liberal Democrats	Simon Wright	63	2.1	+2.1
Majority		2,023	67.8	+13.7
Turnout		2,983	40.3	−24.1
Labour hold		Swing		

=== Davyhulme East ward ===
Davyhulme East
Party	Candidate	Votes	%	±%
Conservative	Linda Blackburn*	1,401	45.2	+2.7
Labour	Jayne Dillon	1,172	37.8	−3.6
UKIP	Ian Royle	321	10.4	−0.7
Green	Steven Tennant-Smythe	128	4.1	−0.8
Liberal Democrats	David Kierman	79	2.5	+2.5
Majority		229	7.4	−6.3
Turnout		3,101	41.9	−27.2
Conservative hold		Swing		

=== Davyhulme West ward ===
Davyhulme West
Party	Candidate	Votes	%	±%
Conservative	Brian Shaw*	1,468	47.9	−3.0
Labour	Sally Carr	1,047	34.2	−7.1
UKIP	Paul Regan	388	12.7	+12.7
Green	Paul Syrett	97	3.2	−4.6
Liberal Democrats	James Eisen	62	2.0	+2.0
Majority		421	13.7	−4.2
Turnout		3,062	41.1	−29.0
Conservative hold		Swing		

=== Flixton ward ===
Flixton
Party	Candidate	Votes	%	±%
Conservative	Paul Lally*	1,475	41.4	−4.7
Labour	Simon Thomas	1,415	39.8	−3.5
UKIP	Michael Bayley-Sanderson	422	11.9	+11.9
Green	Christine McLaughlin	157	4.4	−3.0
Liberal Democrats	David Martin	90	2.5	−0.8
Majority		60	1.7	−1.1
Turnout		3,559	44.1	−28.5
Conservative hold		Swing		

=== Gorse Hill ward ===
Gorse Hill
Party	Candidate	Votes	%	±%
Labour	Laurence Walsh*	1,760	65.9	+2.5
Conservative	Lijo John	440	16.5	−8.7
UKIP	Pauline Royle	261	9.8	−1.6
Green	Jennie Wadsworth	146	5.5	−5.9
Liberal Democrats	Simon Lepori	65	2.4	−3.1
Majority		1,320	49.4	+11.2
Turnout		2,672	34.5	−28.2
Labour hold		Swing		

=== Hale Barns ward ===
Hale Barns
Party	Candidate	Votes	%	±%
Conservative	Patrick Myers*	2.030	69.9	+2.1
Labour Co-op	Barbara Twiney	509	17.5	+1.0
Liberal Democrats	Richard Elliott	225	7.7	−1.7
Green	Deborah Leftwich	141	4.9	−1.4
Majority		1,521	52.4	+1.1
Turnout		2,905	40.4	−30.2
Conservative hold		Swing		

=== Hale Central ward ===
Hale Central
Party	Candidate	Votes	%	±%
Conservative	Denise Haddad	1,614	58.1	−4.0
Labour Co-op	Beverley Harrison	683	24.6	+4.0
Liberal Democrats	Wayne Harrison	278	10.0	+1.5
Green	Giulio Forcolin	201	7.2	−1.6
Majority		931	33.5	−8.0
Turnout		2,776	38.7	−34.8
Conservative hold		Swing		

=== Longford ward ===
Longford
Party	Candidate	Votes	%	±%
Labour	Judith Lloyd*	2,311	67.9	−3.1
Conservative	Catherine Conchie	487	14.3	−6.6
Green	Margaret Westbrook	314	9.2	−5.1
UKIP	Valerie Bayley-Sanderson	214	6.3	+6.3
Liberal Democrats	Christopher Lovell	78	2.3	−4.0
Majority		1,824	53.6	+9.7
Turnout		3,404	40.1	−26.7
Labour hold		Swing		

=== Priory ward ===
Priory
Party	Candidate	Votes	%	±%
Labour	Barry Brotherton*	1,702	55.0	+12.0
Conservative	Paul Jay	822	26.6	−12.7
UKIP	Kevin Grime	236	7.6	+7.6
Liberal Democrats	Michael Macdonald	173	5.6	−1.4
Green	Amanda King	161	5.2	−5.4
Majority		880	28.4	+24.7
Turnout		3,094	39.9	−30.6
Labour hold		Swing		

=== Sale Moor ward ===
Sale Moor
Party	Candidate	Votes	%	±%
Labour	Michael Freeman*	1,547	55.7	+5.0
Conservative	Stephen McHugh	902	32.5	−6.7
Green	Jane Leicester	192	6.9	−3.2
Liberal Democrats	William Jones	134	4.8	+4.8
Majority		645	23.2	+11.7
Turnout		2,775	38.0	−28.1
Labour hold		Swing		

=== St. Mary's ward ===
St. Mary's
Party	Candidate	Votes	%	±%
Conservative	John Holden*	1,772	57.7	+4.3
Labour	Gary Keary	965	31.3	−3.2
Green	Nicholas Robertson-Brown	187	6.1	−0.9
Liberal Democrats	Louise Bird	147	4.8	−0.4
Majority		807	26.3	+7.4
Turnout		3,071	37.6	−28.3
Conservative hold		Swing		

=== Stretford ward ===
Stretford
Party	Candidate	Votes	%	±%
Labour	Tom Ross*	2,004	66.6	+6.6
Conservative	Colin Hooley	656	21.8	−1.7
Green	Elizabeth O'Neill	249	8.3	−4.3
Liberal Democrats	Shaun Ennis	100	3.3	−0.6
Majority		1,348	44.8	+8.3
Turnout		3,009	40.0	−26.5
Labour hold		Swing		

=== Timperley ward ===
Timperley
Party	Candidate	Votes	%	±%
Liberal Democrats	Jane Brophy*	2,176	52.1	+23.1
Conservative	Carol Mounfield	1,388	33.3	−12.9
Labour	Mohammed Ahmed	436	10.4	−8.5
Green	Jadwiga Leigh	173	4.1	−1.7
Majority		788	18.9	+1.7
Turnout		4,173	50.2	−24.7
Liberal Democrats hold		Swing		

=== Urmston ward ===
Urmston
Party	Candidate	Votes	%	±%
Labour	Catherine Hynes*	1,830	47.9	+4.3
Conservative	Christine Turner	1,419	37.1	−0.2
UKIP	Andrew Beaumont	340	8.9	−1.9
Green	Geraldine Coggins	144	3.8	−1.7
Liberal Democrats	Kirsty Cullen	91	2.4	−0.4
Majority		411	10.7	+4.4
Turnout		3,824	46.7	−23.9
Labour hold		Swing		

=== Village ward ===
Village
Party	Candidate	Votes	%	±%
Liberal Democrats	Raymond Bowker*	1,482	45.3	+23.9
Conservative	Thomas Carey	1,050	32.1	−11.1
Labour	Tony O'Brien	616	18.8	−11.3
Green	Matthew Westbrook	123	3.8	−1.5
Majority		432	13.2	+0.1
Turnout		3,271	43.4	−34.2
Liberal Democrats hold		Swing		

== By-elections between 2016 and 2018 ==
Broadheath By-Election 4 May 2017
Party	Candidate	Votes	%	±%
Labour	Amy Marie Whyte	2,086	46.0	−1.2
Conservative	Dave Morgan	1,778	40.9	−0.3
Liberal Democrats	Simon Alexander Latham	271	6.2	+1.1
UKIP	Mike Bayley-Sanderson	91	2.1	
Green	Joe Ryan	80	1.8	−2.0
Independent	Stephen John Farndon	36	0.8	−1.8
Majority		308	7.1	+1.2
Turnout		4342	44.3	+2.5
Labour hold		Swing		

Bucklow-St. Martins By-Election 14 September 2017
Party	Candidate	Votes	%	±%
Labour	Aidan Williams	1,050	64.7	+26.3
Conservative	Sarah Marland	456	28.1	+11.0
UKIP	Andrew Beaumont	65	4.0	−9.3
Green	Joe Ryan	33	2.0	−2.5
Liberal Democrats	Simon Lepori	18	1.1	−1.8
Majority		594	35.7	+21.1
Turnout		1,662	22.0	−10.7
Labour gain from Conservative		Swing		
