= Priory (Trafford ward) =

Electoral ward in Trafford, England

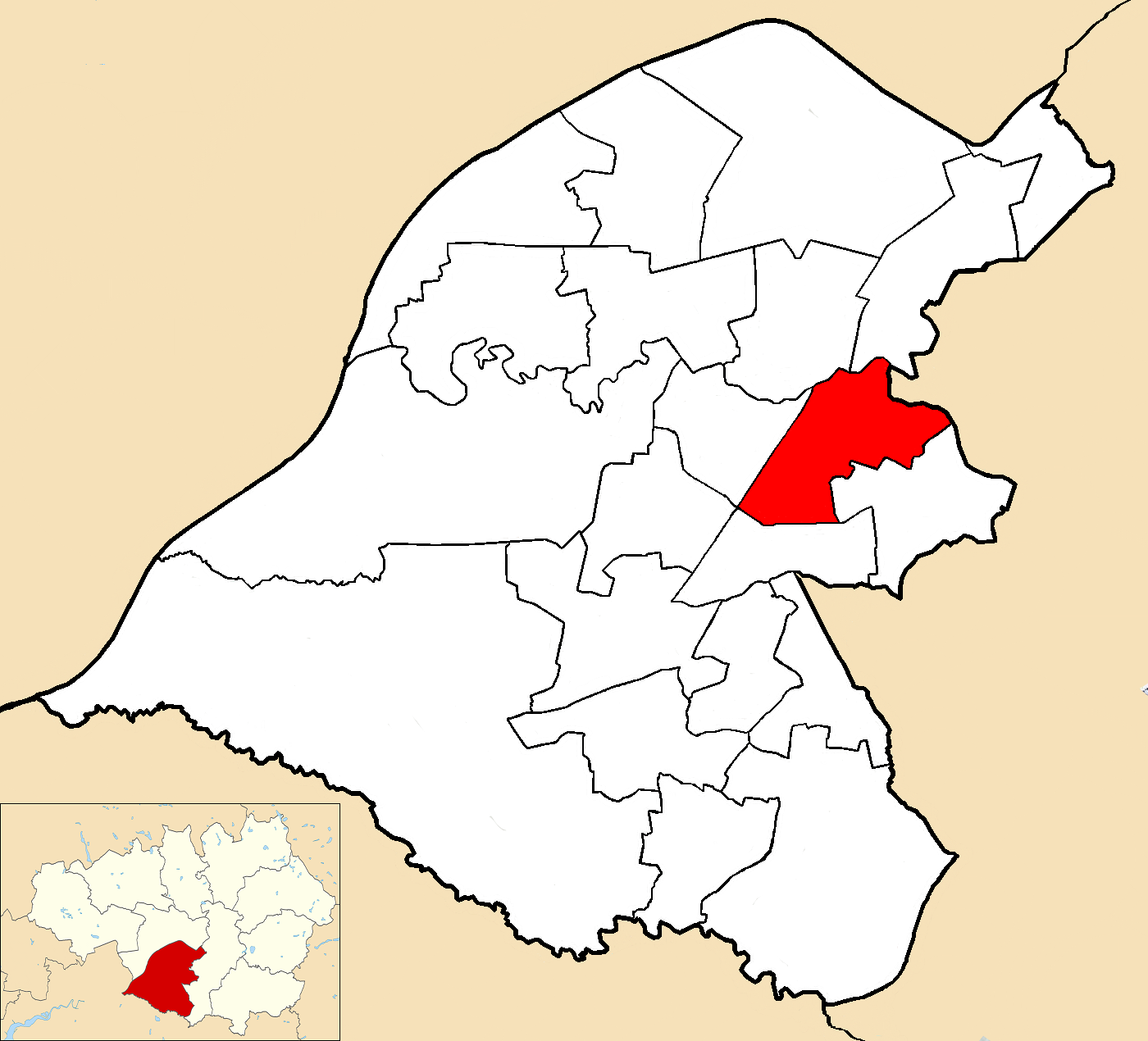
- Priory within Trafford
- Population: 10,917
- Metropolitan borough: Trafford
- Metropolitan county: Greater Manchester
- Country: England
- Sovereign state: United Kingdom
- UK Parliament: Wythenshawe and Sale East
- Councillors: Louise Dagnall (Labour); Andrew Western (Labour); Barry Brotherton (Labour)

Priory is an electoral ward of Trafford, Greater Manchester, covering the northern and central part of Sale, including the Town Centre.

== Councillors ==
As of 2021, the councillors are Louise Dagnall (Labour), Andrew Western (Labour), and Barry Brotherton (Labour).

Election	Councillor	Councillor	Councillor
1973	John Phillipson (Lib)	John Golding (Lib)	Alan Thorpe (Lib)
1975	John Phillipson (Lib)	John Golding (Lib)	K. Newton (Con)
1976	John Phillipson (Lib)	John Sutton (Con)	K. Newton (Con)
1978	Joseph Evans (Con)	John Sutton (Con)	K. Newton (Con)
1979	Joseph Evans (Con)	John Sutton (Con)	John Phillipson (Lib)
1980	Joseph Evans (Con)	John Golding (Lib)	John Phillipson (Lib)
1982	Alan Brookes (Lib)	John Golding (Lib)	John Phillipson (Lib)
1983	Alan Brookes (Lib)	John Golding (Lib)	John Phillipson (Lib)
1984	Alan Brookes (Lib)	John Golding (Lib)	John Phillipson (Lib)
1986	Edna Mitchell (Lib)	John Golding (Lib)	John Phillipson (Lib)
1987	Edna Mitchell (Lib)	John Golding (Lib)	Michael King (Con)
1988	Edna Mitchell (SLD)	John Flynn (Con)	Michael King (Con)
1990	Peter Mitchell (Lab)	John Flynn (Con)	Michael King (Con)
1991	Peter Mitchell (Lab)	John Flynn (Con)	Edna Mitchell (Lib Dem)
1992	Peter Mitchell (Lab)	John Flynn (Con)	Edna Mitchell (Lib Dem)
1994	Barry Brotherton (Lab)	John Flynn (Con)	Edna Mitchell (Lib Dem)
1995	Barry Brotherton (Lab)	John Flynn (Con)	Barbara Keeley (Lab)
1996	Barry Brotherton (Lab)	Roland Griffin (Lab)	Barbara Keeley (Lab)
1998	Barry Brotherton (Lab)	Roland Griffin (Lab)	Barbara Keeley (Lab)
1999	Barry Brotherton (Lab)	Roland Griffin (Lab)	Barbara Keeley (Lab)
2000	Barry Brotherton (Lab)	Roland Griffin (Lab)	Barbara Keeley (Lab)
2002	Barry Brotherton (Lab)	Roland Griffin (Lab)	Barbara Keeley (Lab)
2003	Barry Brotherton (Lab)	Roland Griffin (Lab)	Barbara Keeley (Lab)
2004	Barry Brotherton (Lab)	Roland Griffin (Lab)	Jane Baugh (Lab Co-op)
2006	Barry Brotherton (Lab)	Roland Griffin (Lab)	Jane Baugh (Lab Co-op)
2007	Barry Brotherton (Lab)	Roland Griffin (Lab)	Jane Baugh (Lab Co-op)
2008	Barry Brotherton (Lab)	Roland Griffin (Lab)	Jane Baugh (Lab Co-op)
2010	Barry Brotherton (Lab)	Roland Griffin (Lab)	Jane Baugh (Lab Co-op)
2011	Barry Brotherton (Lab)	Andrew Western (Lab)	Jane Baugh (Lab Co-op)
2012	Barry Brotherton (Lab)	Andrew Western (Lab)	Jane Baugh (Lab Co-op)
2014	Barry Brotherton (Lab)	Andrew Western (Lab)	Jane Baugh (Lab Co-op)
2015	Barry Brotherton (Lab)	Andrew Western (Lab)	Jane Baugh (Lab Co-op)
2016	Barry Brotherton (Lab)	Andrew Western (Lab)	Jane Baugh (Lab Co-op)
2018	Barry Brotherton (Lab)	Andrew Western (Lab)	Jane Baugh (Lab Co-op)
2019	Barry Brotherton (Lab)	Andrew Western (Lab)	Jane Baugh (Lab Co-op)
2020	Barry Brotherton (Lab)	Andrew Western (Lab)	Vacant
2021	Barry Brotherton (Lab)	Andrew Western (Lab)	Louise Dagnall (Lab)
2022	Barry Brotherton (Lab)	Andrew Western (Lab)	Louise Dagnall (Lab)

indicates seat up for re-election. indicates vacant seat. indicates a by-election.

== Elections in the 2020s ==
=== May 2022 ===
2022
Party	Candidate	Votes	%	±%
Labour	Louise Dagnall*	2,076	59.7	
Conservative	Rupali Paul	824	23.7	
Green	Dave Turner	338	9.7	
Liberal Democrats	Briony Stephenson	222	6.4	
Majority		1,252	36.0	
Registered electors		8,123		
Turnout		3,479	42.8	
Labour hold		Swing		

=== May 2021 ===
2021
Party	Candidate	Votes	%	±%
Labour	Barry Brotherton*	2,029	51.0	N/A
Labour	Louise Dagnall	1,981	49.8	N/A
Conservative	Rob Duncan	1,043	26.2	N/A
Conservative	Simon Stonehill	778	19.6	N/A
Green	Nick Robertson-Brown	440	11.1	N/A
Green	Dave Turner	367	9.2	N/A
Liberal Democrats	Briony Stephenson	173	4.4	N/A
Liberal Democrats	David Kierman	166	4.2	N/A
Democratic Network	Ewen Garrod	42	1.1	N/A
Majority		N/A		
Rejected ballots		27		
Registered electors		8,121		
Turnout		3,977	49.0	N/A
Labour hold		Swing	N/A	
Labour hold		Swing	N/A	

== Elections in the 2010s ==
=== May 2019 ===
2019
Party	Candidate	Votes	%	±%
Labour	Andrew Western*	1,511	48.8	▼11.5
Conservative	Louis Marks	679	21.9	▼7.6
Green	Nicholas Robertson-Brown	404	13.0	▲7.9
Liberal Democrats	Briony Stephenson	305	9.8	▲4.7
UKIP	Kevin Grime	199	6.4	N/A
Majority		832	26.85	▼3.95
Registered electors		8,052		
Turnout		3,098	38.61	▼2.29
Labour hold		Swing		

=== May 2018 ===
2018
Party	Candidate	Votes	%	±%
Labour Co-op	Jane Baugh*	2,018	60.3	+5.3
Conservative	George Barker	988	29.5	+2.9
Green	Paul Greer	170	5.1	−0.1
Liberal Democrats	Michael MacDonald	170	5.1	−0.5
Majority		1,030	30.8	
Turnout		3,346	40.9	+1.0
Labour Co-op hold		Swing		

=== May 2016 ===
2016
Party	Candidate	Votes	%	±%
Labour	Barry Brotherton*	1,702	55.0	+12.0
Conservative	Paul Jay	822	26.6	−12.7
UKIP	Kevin Grime	236	7.6	+7.6
Liberal Democrats	Michael Macdonald	173	5.6	−1.4
Green	Amanda King	161	5.2	−5.4
Majority		880	28.4	+24.7
Turnout		3,094	39.9	−30.6
Labour hold		Swing		

=== May 2015 ===
2015
Party	Candidate	Votes	%	±%
Labour	Andrew Western*	2,400	42.8	−10.9
Conservative	Michael Taylor	2,207	39.5	+10.9
Green	Mark Hamer	595	10.6	−0.1
Liberal Democrats	Michael Macdonald	392	7.0	+0.0
Majority		193	3.5	−21.6
Turnout		5,594	70.5	+31.0
Labour hold		Swing		

=== May 2014 ===
2014
Party	Candidate	Votes	%	±%
Labour Co-op	Jane Baugh*	1,609	53.7	+1.9
Conservative	Daniel Critchlow	857	28.6	−2.4
Green	Mark Hamer	322	10.7	+1.7
Liberal Democrats	Michael Macdonald	210	7.0	−1.3
Majority		752	25.1	+2.5
Turnout		2,998	39.5	+2.5
Labour hold		Swing		

=== May 2012 ===
2012
Party	Candidate	Votes	%	±%
Labour Co-op	Barry Brotherton*	1,471	51.8	+8.5
Conservative	Dave Hopps	879	31.0	+2.5
Liberal Democrats	William Jones	255	9.0	−8.8
Green	Paul Bayliss	235	8.3	−2.1
Majority		592	20.8	+6.0
Turnout		2,840	37.4	−6.5
Labour hold		Swing		

=== May 2011 ===
2011
Party	Candidate	Votes	%	±%
Labour	Andrew Western	1,510	43.3	+4.0
Conservative	Zubair Ali	993	28.5	−2.0
Liberal Democrats	William Jones	620	17.8	−7.5
Green	Emma Handley	364	10.4	+5.4
Majority		517	14.8	+6.0
Turnout		3,487	43.9	−22.8
Labour hold		Swing		

=== May 2010 ===
2010
Party	Candidate	Votes	%	±%
Labour	Jane Baugh*	2,087	39.3	−1.6
Conservative	James Callaghan	1,618	30.5	−3.4
Liberal Democrats	Will Jones	1,345	25.3	+13.3
Green	Emma Handley	263	5.0	−3.5
Majority		469	8.8	+1.7
Turnout		5,313	66.7	+28.0
Labour hold		Swing		

== Elections in the 2000s ==
=== May 2008 ===
2008
Party	Candidate	Votes	%	±%
Labour	Barry Brotherton*	1,225	40.9	−1.2
Conservative	Rob Chilton	1,013	33.9	+2.1
Liberal Democrats	James Eisen	358	12.0	−2.2
Green	Emma Handley	253	8.5	−3.5
BNP	Philip Davis	144	4.8	+4.8
Majority		212	7.1	−3.1
Turnout		2,993	38.7	−0.9
Labour hold		Swing		

=== May 2007 ===
2007
Party	Candidate	Votes	%	±%
Labour	Roland Griffin*	1,225	42.1	+2.9
Conservative	Sean Anstee	927	31.8	−1.4
Liberal Democrats	James Eisen	412	14.2	−3.6
Green	Zoe Power	348	12.0	+2.2
Majority		298	10.2	+4.2
Turnout		2,912	39.6	+0.3
Labour hold		Swing		

=== May 2006 ===
2006
Party	Candidate	Votes	%	±%
Labour	Jane Baugh*	1,121	39.2	−1.2
Conservative	Marion Rigby	950	33.2	+1.5
Liberal Democrats	Margaret Clarke	510	17.8	−7.9
Green	Joseph Westbrook	281	9.8	+9.8
Majority		171	6.0	+2.6
Turnout		2,862	39.3	−12.1
Labour hold		Swing		

=== May 2004 ===
2004 (after boundary changes)
Party	Candidate	Votes	%	±%
Labour	Barry Brotherton*	1,413	14.3	
Labour	Roland Griffin*	1,320	13.4	
Labour	Jane Baugh*	1,248	12.7	
Conservative	Joseph Garner	1,135	11.5	
Conservative	Hugh Pitcher	1,063	10.8	
Liberal Democrats	John Hunter	932	9.6	
Conservative	Saleem Bhatti	923	9.4	
Liberal Democrats	Michael Riley	821	8.3	
Liberal Democrats	Derek Hurst	771	7.8	
BNP	Jason Gough	232	2.4	
Turnout		9,858	51.4	
Labour win (new seat)				
Labour win (new seat)				
Labour win (new seat)				

=== May 2003 ===
2003
Party	Candidate	Votes	%	±%
Labour	Barbara Keeley*	1,620	40.9	−7.6
Conservative	Daniel Bunting	1,198	30.2	+0.2
Liberal Democrats	Michael Riley	907	22.9	+1.4
Green	Steven Flower	241	6.1	+6.1
Majority		422	10.7	−7.8
Turnout		3,966	54.6	+3.3
Labour hold		Swing		

=== May 2002 ===
2002
Party	Candidate	Votes	%	±%
Labour	Barry Brotherton*	1,909	48.5	−0.5
Conservative	Joseph Garner	1,183	30.0	−3.9
Liberal Democrats	Michael Riley	846	21.5	+4.4
Majority		726	18.5	+3.4
Turnout		3,938	51.3	+10.4
Labour hold		Swing		

=== May 2000 ===
2000
Party	Candidate	Votes	%	±%
Labour	Roland Griffin*	1,560	49.0	+0.8
Conservative	Alexander Williams	1,077	33.9	−1.5
Liberal Democrats	Michael Riley	545	17.1	+0.7
Majority		483	15.1	+2.3
Turnout		3,182	40.9	+4.3
Labour hold		Swing		

== Elections in the 1990s ==
1999
Party	Candidate	Votes	%	±%
Labour	Barbara Keeley-Huggett*	1,373	48.2	−4.8
Conservative	Nightingale	1,009	35.4	+8.5
Liberal Democrats	Vernon	468	16.4	−3.7
Majority		364	12.8	−13.3
Turnout		2,850	36.6	−0.3
Labour hold		Swing		

1998
Party	Candidate	Votes	%	±%
Labour	Barry Brotherton*	1,533	53.0	+9.4
Conservative	C. E. McEwen	778	26.9	+3.6
Liberal Democrats	A. Vernon	580	20.1	−13.0
Majority		755	26.1	+15.7
Turnout		2,891	36.9	−8.9
Labour hold		Swing		

1996
Party	Candidate	Votes	%	±%
Labour	Roland O. Griffin	1,540	43.6	+3.0
Liberal Democrats	D. M. Browne	1,171	33.1	−0.8
Conservative	L. M. L. Burton	822	23.3	−2.2
Majority		369	10.4	+3.7
Turnout		3,533	45.8	−2.9
Labour gain from Conservative		Swing		

1995
Party	Candidate	Votes	%	±%
Labour	Barbara M. Keeley-Huggett	1,529	40.6	+3.3
Liberal Democrats	E. Mitchell*	1,276	33.9	+1.4
Conservative	C. M. Dillon	962	25.5	−4.8
Majority		253	6.7	+1.9
Turnout		3,767	48.7	−1.7
Labour gain from Liberal Democrats		Swing		

1994
Party	Candidate	Votes	%	±%
Labour	Barry Brotherton	1,454	37.3	+11.1
Liberal Democrats	C. Smith	1,267	32.5	+2.3
Conservative	R. C. Heads	1,181	30.3	−13.3
Majority		187	4.8	−8.7
Turnout		3,902	50.4	+3.4
Labour hold		Swing		

1992
Party	Candidate	Votes	%	±%
Conservative	J. P. Flynn*	1,586	43.6	+11.5
Liberal Democrats	C. Smith	1,097	30.2	−6.8
Labour	G. Smethurst	952	26.2	−4.7
Majority		489	13.5	+8.6
Turnout		3,635	47.0	−2.9
Conservative hold		Swing		

1991
Party	Candidate	Votes	%	±%
Liberal Democrats	E. Mitchell	1,442	37.0	+3.5
Conservative	M. E. King*	1,251	32.1	+0.3
Labour	P. Miller	1,207	30.9	−3.0
Majority		191	4.9	+4.4
Turnout		3,900	49.9	−1.6
Liberal Democrats gain from Conservative		Swing		

1990
Party	Candidate	Votes	%	±%
Labour	P. W. Mitchell	1,324	33.9	+4.1
Liberal Democrats	E. Mitchell*	1,305	33.5	+1.6
Conservative	D. R. Baldwin	1,239	31.8	−6.4
Green	M. C. Peplow	160	4.1	+4.1
Majority		19	0.5	−5.8
Turnout		3,900	51.5	+5.7
Labour gain from Liberal Democrats		Swing		

== Elections in the 1980s ==
1988
Party	Candidate	Votes	%	±%
Conservative	J. P. Flynn	1,426	38.2	+0.2
Liberal Democrats	W. J. Golding*	1,190	31.9	−3.5
Labour	R. P. Joinson	1,113	29.8	+3.2
Majority		236	6.3	+3.7
Turnout		3,729	45.8	−5.8
Conservative gain from Liberal Democrats		Swing		

1987
Party	Candidate	Votes	%	±%
Conservative	M. E. King	1,589	38.0	+11.1
Liberal	C. S. Fink	1,482	35.4	−3.9
Labour	P. J. English	1,113	26.6	−7.2
Majority		107	2.6	−2.9
Turnout		4,184	51.6	+9.2
Conservative gain from Liberal		Swing		

1986
Party	Candidate	Votes	%	±%
Liberal	E. Mitchell	1,351	39.3	−0.4
Labour	B. K. Lund	1,161	33.8	+8.1
Conservative	G. V. Burrows	926	26.9	−7.7
Majority		190	5.5	+0.4
Turnout		3,438	42.4	+1.1
Liberal hold		Swing		

1984
Party	Candidate	Votes	%	±%
Liberal	W. J. Golding*	1,307	39.7	−7.0
Conservative	P. Schofield	1,139	34.6	−1.1
Labour	R. O. Griffin	848	25.7	+8.1
Majority		168	5.1	−5.8
Turnout		3,294	41.3	−3.8
Liberal hold		Swing		

1983
Party	Candidate	Votes	%	±%
Alliance	J. M. Phillipson*	1,670	46.7	+2.8
Conservative	G. N. Beck	1,279	35.7	−5.3
Labour	N. P. J. Cowell	629	17.6	+2.5
Majority		391	10.9	+8.0
Turnout		3,578	45.1	+5.5
Alliance hold		Swing		

1982
Party	Candidate	Votes	%	±%
Liberal	A. L. Brookes	1,389	43.9	+1.5
Conservative	A. Rhodes	1,297	41.0	+5.6
Labour	P. N. J. Frizzby	478	15.1	−7.1
Majority		92	2.9	−4.1
Turnout		3,164	39.6	−3.5
Liberal gain from Conservative		Swing		

1980
Party	Candidate	Votes	%	±%
Liberal	W. J. Golding	1,459	42.4	+0.7
Conservative	J. R. Sutton*	1,218	35.4	−3.6
Labour	R. J. Ellis	762	22.2	+2.9
Majority		241	7.0	+4.3
Turnout		3,439	43.1	−32.2
Liberal gain from Conservative		Swing		

== Elections in the 1970s ==
1979
Party	Candidate	Votes	%	±%
Liberal	J. M. Phillipson	2,657	41.7	+4.9
Conservative	A. D. Barker	2,486	39.0	−8.5
Labour	H. Pollard	1,228	19.3	+3.6
Majority		171	2.7	−8.0
Turnout		6,371	75.3	+34.9
Liberal gain from Conservative		Swing		

1978
Party	Candidate	Votes	%	±%
Conservative	J. H. Evans	1,634	47.5	+1.1
Liberal	J. M. Phillipson*	1,265	36.8	+5.5
Labour	B. Brotherton	541	15.7	−6.6
Majority		369	10.7	−4.4
Turnout		3,440	40.4	−4.9
Conservative gain from Liberal		Swing		

1976
Party	Candidate	Votes	%	±%
Conservative	J. R. Sutton	1,789	46.4	−0.9
Liberal	W. J. Golding*	1,208	31.3	−3.2
Labour	J. K. Morgan	858	22.3	+4.1
Majority		581	15.1	+2.2
Turnout		3,855	45.3	+4.3
Conservative gain from Liberal		Swing		

1975
Party	Candidate	Votes	%	±%
Conservative	K. R. Newton	1,642	47.3	
Liberal	A. Thorpe*	1,195	34.5	
Labour	D. N. Teasdale	631	18.2	
Majority		447	12.9	
Turnout		3,468	41.0	
Conservative gain from Liberal		Swing		

1973
Party	Candidate	Votes	%	±%
Liberal	J. M. Phillipson	1,605	40.1	
Liberal	W. J. Golding	1,529		
Liberal	A. Thorpe	1,475		
Conservative	J. Peet	1,435	35.9	
Conservative	F. Laughton	1,417		
Conservative	J. Sutton	1,349		
Labour	K. Walton	856	21.4	
Labour	K. Tottle	806		
Labour	T. Packham	705		
Communist	D. Hames	102	2.6	
Majority		40		
Turnout		3,998	44.1	
Liberal win (new seat)				
Liberal win (new seat)				
Liberal win (new seat)				
