= 1991 Trafford Metropolitan Borough Council election =

1991 UK local government election

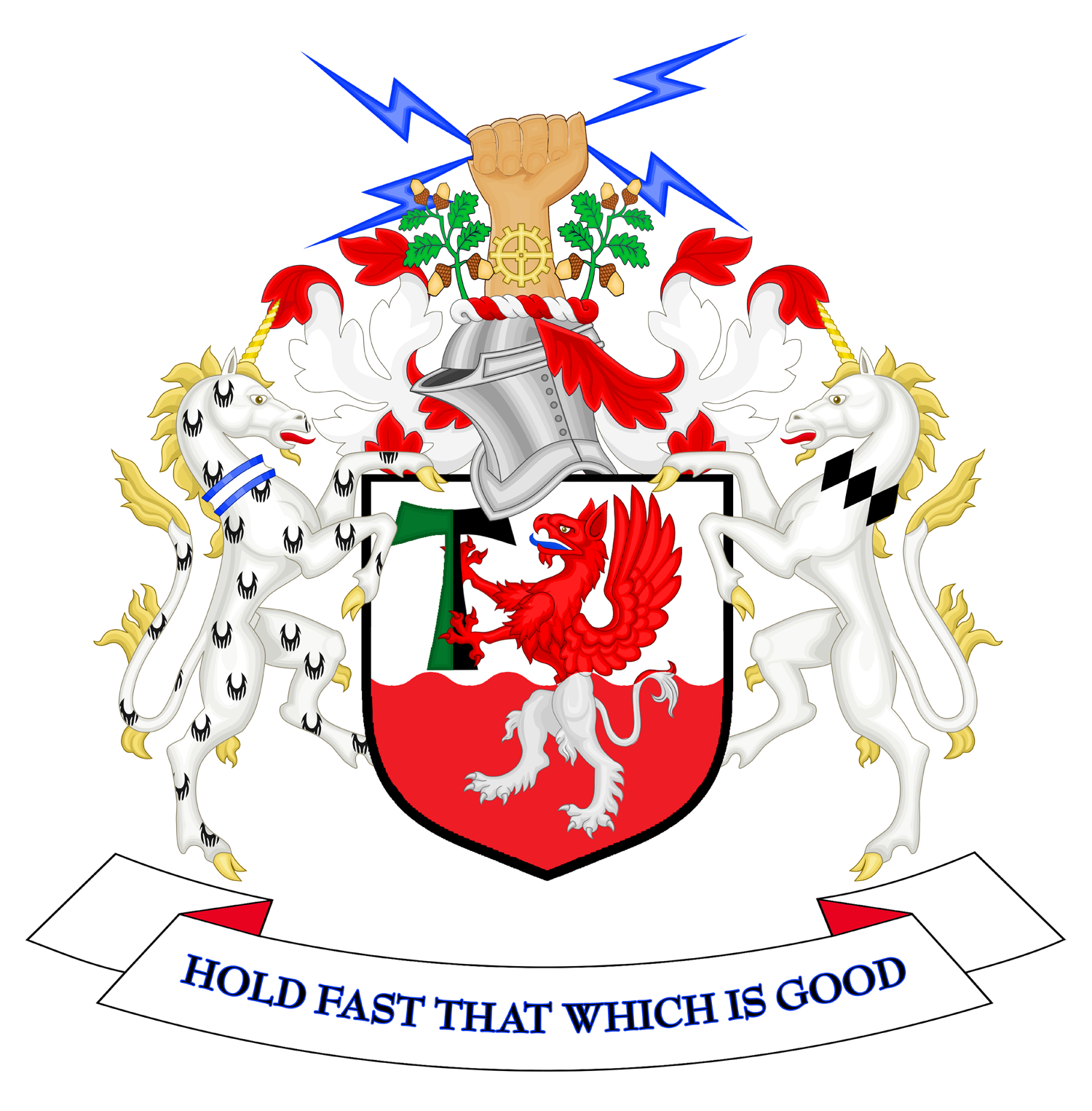
- 2 May 1991

21 of 63 seats to Trafford Metropolitan Borough Council 32 seats needed for a majority
	First party	Second party	Third party
Leader	Colin Warbrick	Barry Brotherton	Ray Bowker
Party	Conservative	Labour	Liberal Democrats
Leader's seat	Urmston	Sale Moor	Village
Last election	13 seats, 45.3%	10 seats, 39.4%	0 seats, 9.2%
Seats before	37	24	1
Seats won	12	8	2
Seats after	34	25	3
Seat change	▼3	▲1	▲2
Popular vote	35,971	28,572	11,322
Percentage	46.7%	37.1%	14.7%
Swing	▲1.4%	▼2.3%	▲5.5%
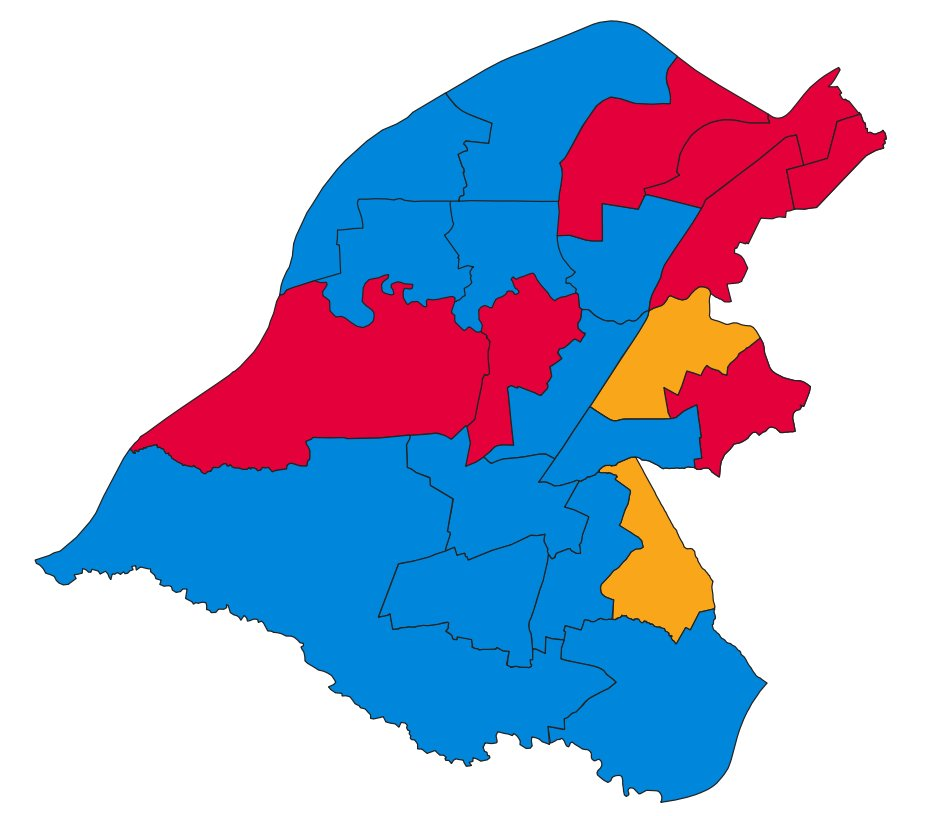
- Map of results of 1991 election
Leader of the Council before election
Colin Warbrick
Conservative
Leader of the Council after election
Colin Warbrick
Conservative

Elections to Trafford Council were held on 2 May 1991. One-third of the council was up for election, with each successful candidate to serve a four-year term of office, expiring in 1995. The Conservative party retained overall control of the council.

== Election result ==
Party	Votes		Seats			Full Council	
Conservative Party	35,971 (46.7%)	▲1.4	12 (57.1%)	12 / 21	▼3	34 (54.0%)	34 / 63
Labour Party	28,572 (37.1%)	▼2.3	7 (33.3%)	7 / 21	▲1	25 (39.7%)	25 / 63
Liberal Democrats	11,322 (14.7%)	▲5.5	2 (9.5%)	2 / 21	▲2	3 (4.8%)	3 / 63
Independent	955 (1.2%)	▼0.5	0 (0.0%)	0 / 21	Steady	1 (1.6%)	1 / 63
Green Party	133 (0.2%)	▼4.2	0 (0.0%)	0 / 21	Steady	0 (0.0%)	0 / 63

↓
25	1	3	34

== Ward results ==
=== Altrincham ===
Altrincham
Party	Candidate	Votes	%	±%
Conservative	C. S. Gordon*	1,970	49.4	+4.8
Labour	F. W. Bamford	1,546	38.8	−4.5
Liberal Democrats	M. H. Cameron	470	11.8	+5.4
Majority		424	10.6	+9.2
Turnout		3,986	48.0	−2.0
Conservative hold		Swing		

=== Bowdon ===
Bowdon
Party	Candidate	Votes	%	±%
Conservative	S. Poole*	2,676	67.1	+1.7
Liberal Democrats	J. Preston	657	16.5	+5.1
Labour	S. Hesford	521	13.1	−5.3
Green	M. R. Rowtham	133	3.3	−1.7
Majority		2,019	50.6	+28.5
Turnout		3,987	45.1	−3.3
Conservative hold		Swing		

=== Broadheath ===
Broadheath
Party	Candidate	Votes	%	±%
Conservative	L. M. L. Burton*	1,923	47.5	+6.4
Labour	E. R. Holden	1,581	39.1	−5.6
Liberal Democrats	J. B. Weightman	542	13.4	+4.2
Majority		342	8.5	+4.9
Turnout		4,046	41.0	−7.0
Conservative hold		Swing		

=== Brooklands ===
Brooklands
Party	Candidate	Votes	%	±%
Conservative	S. J. Hartland	2,596	63.7	+3.2
Liberal Democrats	K. F. Humber	862	21.2	+6.7
Labour	W. Stennett	615	15.1	−4.8
Majority		1,734	42.6	+2.1
Turnout		4,073	50.7	+0.4
Conservative hold		Swing		

=== Bucklow ===
Bucklow
Party	Candidate	Votes	%	±%
Labour	K. Rogers*	1,263	54.6	+29.1
Independent	Y. S. Robertson	774	33.4	+33.4
Conservative	B. J. Shannon	277	12.0	+0.1
Majority		489	21.1	−9.9
Turnout		2,314	34.9	−10.1
Labour hold		Swing		

=== Clifford ===
Clifford
Party	Candidate	Votes	%	±%
Labour	J. S. Maher*	1,944	71.7	6.0
Conservative	M. T. Wyne	767	28.3	+6.0
Majority		1,177	43.4	−12.1
Turnout		2,711	34.2	−5.4
Labour hold		Swing		

=== Davyhulme East ===
Davyhulme East
Party	Candidate	Votes	%	±%
Conservative	R. E. Crosbie*	1,907	52.2	−0.1
Labour	G. Smethurst	1,292	35.4	−6.2
Liberal Democrats	F. A. Cameron	271	7.4	+7.4
Independent	J. W. Rowton	181	5.0	+5.0
Majority		615	16.8	+6.1
Turnout		3,651	48.1	−5.1
Conservative hold		Swing		

=== Davyhulme West ===
Davyhulme West
Party	Candidate	Votes	%	±%
Conservative	P. Bates*	2,042	52.4	+2.2
Labour	A. G. Hodson	1,445	37.1	−12.7
Liberal Democrats	M. E. Clarke	408	10.5	+10.5
Majority		597	15.3	+14.9
Turnout		3,895	48.7	−2.1
Conservative hold		Swing		

=== Flixton ===
Flixton
Party	Candidate	Votes	%	±%
Conservative	J. G. Graham	1,881	44.1	+1.8
Labour	T. K. McDonald	1,257	29.5	−5.1
Liberal Democrats	A. Vernon	1,125	26.4	+7.3
Majority		624	14.6	+6.9
Turnout		4,263	55.2	−4.6
Conservative hold		Swing		

=== Hale ===
Hale
Party	Candidate	Votes	%	±%
Conservative	P. J. Myers	2,714	67.8	−3.9
Liberal Democrats	D. C. R. Horstead	893	22.3	+13.3
Labour	R. E. Lucas	396	9.9	−4.8
Majority		1,821	45.5	−11.5
Turnout		4,003	46.6	−1.4
Conservative hold		Swing		

=== Longford ===
Longford
Party	Candidate	Votes	%	±%
Labour	D. P. Jarman	1,750	51.2	−3.3
Conservative	K. G. Summerfield*	1,669	48.8	+9.9
Majority		81	2.4	−13.3
Turnout		3,419	45.6	−3.2
Labour gain from Conservative		Swing		

=== Mersey-St. Mary's ===
Mersey St. Marys
Party	Candidate	Votes	%	±%
Conservative	B. Sharp*	2,884	63.5	+1.9
Labour	B. D. Eckford	1,030	22.7	−4.6
Liberal Democrats	R. J. Thompson	629	13.8	+8.0
Majority		1,854	40.8	+24.8
Turnout		4,543	48.5	−1.9
Conservative hold		Swing		

=== Park ===
Park
Party	Candidate	Votes	%	±%
Labour	R. A. Tully*	1,461	59.0	−5.0
Conservative	E. J. Kelson	1,017	41.0	+5.0
Majority		444	18.0	−10.0
Turnout		2,478	41.4	−5.0
Labour hold		Swing		

=== Priory ===
Priory
Party	Candidate	Votes	%	±%
Liberal Democrats	E. Mitchell	1,442	37.0	+3.5
Conservative	M. E. King*	1,251	32.1	+0.3
Labour	P. Miller	1,207	30.9	−3.0
Majority		191	4.9	+4.4
Turnout		3,900	49.9	−1.6
Liberal Democrats gain from Conservative		Swing		

=== Sale Moor ===
Sale Moor
Party	Candidate	Votes	%	±%
Labour	C. H. Merry*	1,608	43.9	−4.0
Conservative	F. Leigh	1,373	37.5	−1.1
Liberal Democrats	K. Clarke	681	18.6	+9.2
Majority		235	6.4	−2.9
Turnout		3,662	47.4	−3.4
Labour hold		Swing		

=== St. Martin's ===
St. Martins
Party	Candidate	Votes	%	±%
Labour	D. A. Quayle	2,032	51.7	−8.6
Conservative	J. Tolhurst	1,493	38.0	+4.3
Liberal Democrats	T. J. P. Corbett	402	10.2	+10.2
Majority		539	13.7	−12.9
Turnout		3,927	42.8	−4.0
Labour hold		Swing		

=== Stretford ===
Stretford
Party	Candidate	Votes	%	±%
Conservative	H. Walker*	1,827	45.9	+5.8
Labour	B. E. Garlick	1,822	45.8	−5.8
Liberal Democrats	F. C. Beswick	328	8.2	+3.4
Majority		5	0.1	−11.3
Turnout		3,977	49.5	−1.0
Conservative hold		Swing		

=== Talbot ===
Talbot
Party	Candidate	Votes	%	±%
Labour	P. A. Lane*	1,731	69.1	−3.5
Conservative	C. J. Levenston	775	30.9	+10.2
Majority		956	38.1	−13.8
Turnout		2,506	37.2	−3.1
Labour hold		Swing		

=== Timperley ===
Timperley
Party	Candidate	Votes	%	±%
Conservative	H. Scholar*	2,160	52.5	+5.7
Labour	R. W. J. Small	1,021	24.8	−5.2
Liberal Democrats	J. E. Brophy	937	22.8	−3.4
Majority		1,139	27.7	+20.5
Turnout		4,118	47.3	−3.2
Conservative hold		Swing		

=== Urmston ===
Urmston
Party	Candidate	Votes	%	±%
Conservative	E. May*	1,950	50.2	+8.0
Labour	L. M. Seex	1,935	49.8	−0.8
Majority		15	0.4	−8.0
Turnout		3,885	50.5	−2.6
Conservative hold		Swing		

=== Village ===
Village
Party	Candidate	Votes	%	±%
Liberal Democrats	B. V. Ackroyd	1,675	38.3	+9.3
Conservative	R. J. M. Bishop	1,586	36.2	+0.6
Labour	D. R. Holland	1,115	25.5	−7.2
Majority		89	2.1	−0.8
Turnout		4,376	53.2	−1.8
Liberal Democrats gain from Conservative		Swing		

== By-elections between 1991 and 1992 ==
Stretford By-Election 5 December 1991
Party	Candidate	Votes	%	±%
Labour	B. E. Garlick	1,656	48.0	+2.2
Conservative	H. Walker*	1,654	47.9	−2.0
Liberal Democrats	F. C. Beswick	140	4.1	−4.1
Majority		2	0.1	+34.1
Turnout		3,450	42.9	−6.6
Labour gain from Conservative		Swing		
