= Village (Trafford ward) =

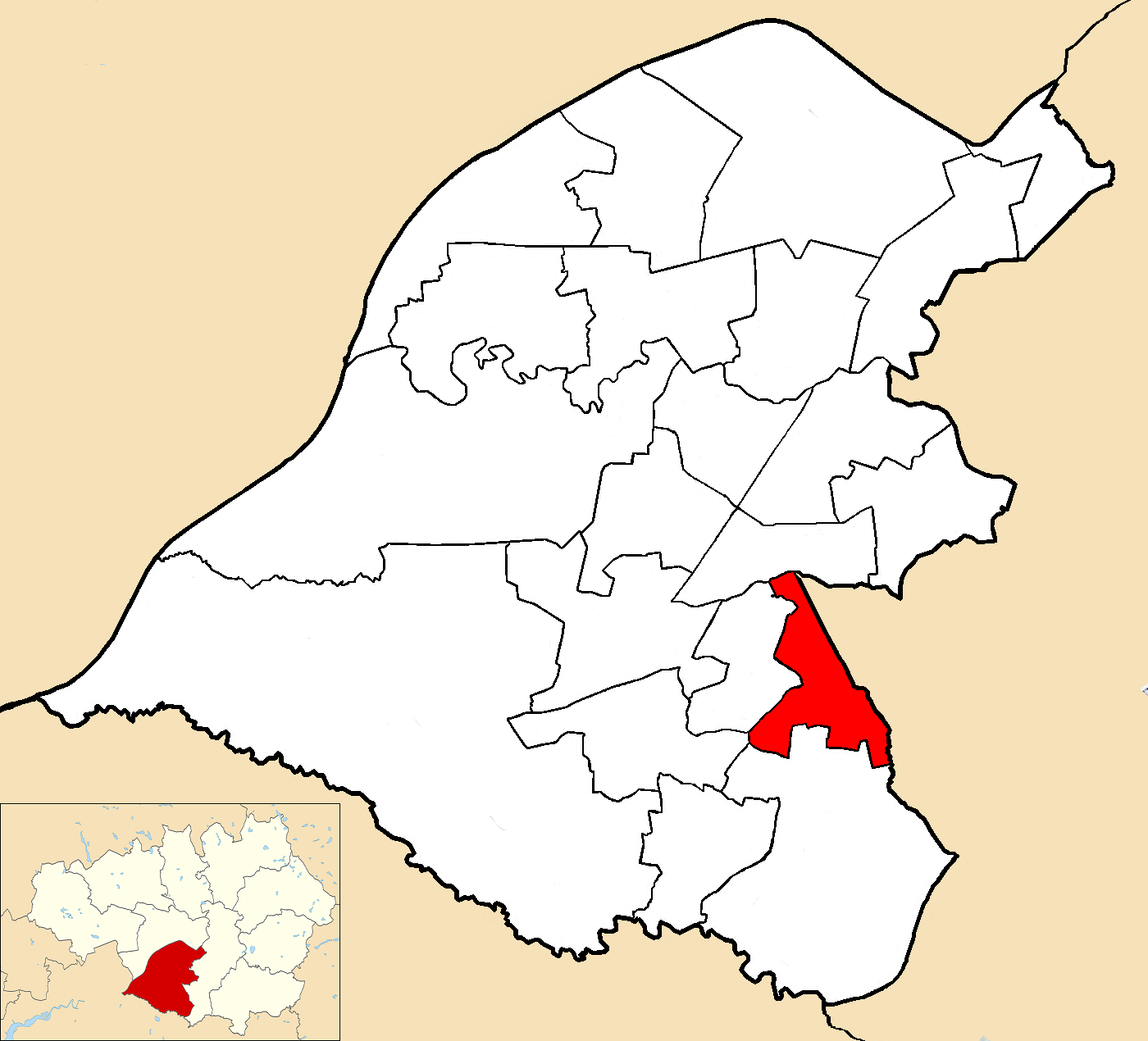
- Village within Trafford
- Population: 10,899
- Metropolitan borough: Trafford
- Metropolitan county: Greater Manchester
- Country: England
- Sovereign state: United Kingdom
- UK Parliament: Altrincham and Sale West
- Councillors: Shaun Ennis (Lib Dem); Julian Newgrosh (Lib Dem); Linda Blackburn (Conservative)

Village was an electoral ward of Trafford, Greater Manchester, covering the eastern part of the village of Timperley, including the Village Centre, and part of Brooklands.

The ward's initial boundaries roughly corresponded to those of Timperley (IV) ward on Altrincham Council. Its predecessor ward had been a battleground between the Conservative and Labour parties, however, Labour's presence in the new ward was short-lived after the Liberals gained a foothold. Throughout the 1980s the ward was a marginal between the Liberals (latterly the Liberal Democrats) and Conservatives before becoming relatively safe for the Liberal Democrats who won it at every election from 1991 until 2010. Changing political fortunes allowed the Conservatives to make gains in the ward in 2011, 2018, and 2021, despite this the Liberal Democrats maintained a constant presence in the ward, winning back lost seats in 2019 and 2022, the latter giving the party its largest majority at any election in the borough since 2008. Village ward was abolished by boundary changes in 2023 with its area divided between Timperley Central, Timperley North, and Hale Barns and Timperley South.

Councillor Ray Bowker held the ward from 1974 to 1976 and again from 1980 until his death in January 2020, at the time of his death, Councillor Bowker was one of two Trafford Councillors who had been members of the council upon its creation in 1974.

== Councillors ==
Three councillors serve the ward: Shaun Ennis (Lib Dem), Julian Newgrosh (Lib Dem) and Linda Blackburn (Con)

Election	Councillor	Councillor	Councillor
1973	Harry Wharton (Lab)	Ray Bowker (Lib)	Vincent Collett (Lab)
1975	Harry Wharton (Lab)	Ray Bowker (Lib)	J. Robertson (Con)
1976	Harry Wharton (Lab)	Audrey Weedall (Con)	J. Robertson (Con)
Oct 1976	Ronald Holden (Con)	Audrey Weedall (Con)	J. Robertson (Con)
1978	L. McCowatt (Con)	Audrey Weedall (Con)	J. Robertson (Con)
1979	Wilfred Watkins (Con)	Audrey Weedall (Con)	Gordon Toft (Con)
1980	Wilfred Watkins (Con)	Ray Bowker (Lib)	Gordon Toft (Con)
Mar 1982	Wilfred Watkins (Con)	Ray Bowker (Lib)	Richard Slack (Lib)
1982	Brenda Ackroyd (Lib)	Ray Bowker (Lib)	Richard Slack (Lib)
1983	Brenda Ackroyd (Lib)	Ray Bowker (Lib)	David Merrell (Con)
1984	Brenda Ackroyd (Lib)	Ray Bowker (Lib)	David Merrell (Con)
1986	Mike Cragg (Lib)	Ray Bowker (Lib)	David Merrell (Con)
1987	Mike Cragg (Lib)	Ray Bowker (Lib)	M. Booth (Con)
1988	Mike Cragg (SLD)	Ray Bowker (SLD)	M. Booth (Con)
1990	Anne Bowker (Con)	Ray Bowker (Lib Dem)	M. Booth (Con)
1991	Anne Bowker (Con)	Ray Bowker (Lib Dem)	Brenda Ackroyd (Lib Dem)
1992	Anne Bowker (Con)	Ray Bowker (Lib Dem)	Brenda Ackroyd (Lib Dem)
1994	Jane Brophy (Lib Dem)	Ray Bowker (Lib Dem)	Brenda Ackroyd (Lib Dem)
1995	Jane Brophy (Lib Dem)	Ray Bowker (Lib Dem)	Brenda Ackroyd (Lib Dem)
1996	Jane Brophy (Lib Dem)	Ray Bowker (Lib Dem)	Brenda Ackroyd (Lib Dem)
1998	Mike Cragg (Lib Dem)	Ray Bowker (Lib Dem)	Brenda Ackroyd (Lib Dem)
1999	Mike Cragg (Lib Dem)	Ray Bowker (Lib Dem)	Brenda Ackroyd (Lib Dem)
2000	Mike Cragg (Lib Dem)	Ray Bowker (Lib Dem)	Brenda Ackroyd (Lib Dem)
2002	Tony Fishwick (Lib Dem)	Ray Bowker (Lib Dem)	Brenda Ackroyd (Lib Dem)
2003	Tony Fishwick (Lib Dem)	Ray Bowker (Lib Dem)	Jane Brophy (Lib Dem)
2004	Ray Bowker (Lib Dem)	Jane Brophy (Lib Dem)	Tony Fishwick (Lib Dem)
2006	Ray Bowker (Lib Dem)	Jane Brophy (Lib Dem)	Tony Fishwick (Lib Dem)
2007	Ray Bowker (Lib Dem)	Hazel Bowker (Lib Dem)	Tony Fishwick (Lib Dem)
2008	Ray Bowker (Lib Dem)	Hazel Bowker (Lib Dem)	Tony Fishwick (Lib Dem)
2010	Ray Bowker (Lib Dem)	Hazel Bowker (Lib Dem)	Tony Fishwick (Lib Dem)
2011	Ray Bowker (Lib Dem)	Laura Evans (Con)	Tony Fishwick (Lib Dem)
2012	Ray Bowker (Lib Dem)	Laura Evans (Con)	Tony Fishwick (Lib Dem)
2014	Ray Bowker (Lib Dem)	Laura Evans (Con)	Tony Fishwick (Lib Dem)
2015	Ray Bowker (Lib Dem)	Laura Evans (Con)	Tony Fishwick (Lib Dem)
2016	Ray Bowker (Lib Dem)	Laura Evans (Con)	Tony Fishwick (Lib Dem)
2018	Ray Bowker (Lib Dem)	Laura Evans (Con)	Thomas Carey (Con)
2019	Ray Bowker (Lib Dem)	Julian Newgrosh (Lib Dem)	Thomas Carey (Con)
June 2019	Ray Bowker (Independent Lib Dem)	Julian Newgrosh (Lib Dem	Thomas Carey (Con)
January; 2020	Vacant	Julian Newgrosh (Lib Dem)	Thomas Carey (Con)
2021	Linda Blackburn (Con)	Julian Newgrosh (Lib Dem)	Thomas Carey (Con)
2022	Linda Blackburn (Con)	Julian Newgrosh (Lib Dem)	Shaun Ennis (Lib Dem)

indicates seat up for re-election. indicates vacant seat.

== Elections in 2020s ==
=== May 2022 ===
2022
Party	Candidate	Votes	%	±%
Liberal Democrats	Shaun Ennis	1,764	52.7	▲22.5
Conservative	Thomas Maxwell	939	28.1	▼9.8
Labour	Adam Legg	512	15.3	▼11.2
Green	Jennie Wadsworth	122	3.6	▼1.3
Majority		825	24.7	▲16.9
Registered electors		7,914		
Turnout		3,346	42.3	▼0.4
Liberal Democrats gain from Conservative		Swing		

=== May 2021 ===
2021
Party	Candidate	Votes	%	±%
Conservative	Linda Blackburn	1,293	37.9	▲8.5
Liberal Democrats	Shaun Ennis	1,028	30.2	▼10.8
Labour	Will Jones	901	26.5	▲12.2
Green	Robert Raikes	168	4.9	▼1.2
Majority		265	7.8	▼3.7
Registered electors		7,972		
Turnout		3,405	42.7	▼2.2
Conservative gain from Independent		Swing		

== Elections in 2010s ==
=== May 2019 ===
2019
Party	Candidate	Votes	%	±%
Liberal Democrats	Julian Newgrosh	1,310	41.0	▲10.2
Conservative	Darren Meacher	942	29.4	▼11.4
Labour	Waseem Hassan	456	14.3	▼8.5
UKIP	Angela O'Neill	295	9.2	▲5.9
Green	Robert Raikes	196	6.1	▲3.7
Majority		368	11.50	▲1.4
Registered electors		7,905		
Turnout		3,199	40.47	▼0.73
Liberal Democrats gain from Conservative		Swing		

=== May 2018 ===
2018
Party	Candidate	Votes	%	±%
Conservative	Thomas Carey	1,331	40.8	+8.7
Liberal Democrats	Tony Fishwick*	1,003	30.8	−14.5
Labour	Tony O'Brien	742	22.8	+4.0
UKIP	Angela O'Neill	106	3.3	+3.3
Green	Matthew Westbrook	78	2.4	−1.4
Majority		328	10.1	
Turnout		3,260	41.2	−2.2
Conservative gain from Liberal Democrats		Swing		

=== May 2016 ===
2016
Party	Candidate	Votes	%	±%
Liberal Democrats	Raymond Bowker*	1,482	45.3	+23.9
Conservative	Thomas Carey	1,050	32.1	−11.1
Labour	William O'Brien	616	18.8	−11.3
Green	Matthew Westbrook	123	3.8	−1.5
Majority		432	13.2	+0.1
Turnout		3,271	33.4	−34.2
Liberal Democrats hold		Swing		

=== May 2015 ===
2015
Party	Candidate	Votes	%	±%
Conservative	Laura Evans*	2,246	43.2	+8.1
Labour	Tony O'Brien	1,564	30.1	+3.9
Liberal Democrats	Julian Newgrosh	1,112	21.4	−12.0
Green	Jennie Wadsworth	276	5.3	0
Majority		682	13.1	+11.3
Turnout		5,198	67.6	+23.5
Conservative hold		Swing		

=== May 2014 ===
2014
Party	Candidate	Votes	%	±%
Liberal Democrats	Tony Fishwick*	1,087	36.5	−8.8
Conservative	Andy Iredale	971	32.6	+3.7
Labour	Tony O'Brien	662	22.2	+3.4
Green	Michael Leigh	258	8.7	+2.5
Majority		116	3.9	−10.7
Turnout		2.978	38.4	
Liberal Democrats hold		Swing		

=== May 2012 ===
2012
Party	Candidate	Votes	%	±%
Liberal Democrats	Ray Bowker*	1,398	45.3	+11.9
Conservative	Matthew Sephton	893	28.9	−6.2
Labour	Helen Boyle	604	19.6	−6.6
Green	Michael Leigh	191	6.2	+0.9
Majority		505	16.4	+14.6
Turnout		3,086	41.0	−3.1
Liberal Democrats hold		Swing		

=== May 2011 ===
2011
Party	Candidate	Votes	%	±%
Conservative	Laura Evans	1,215	35.1	+3.4
Liberal Democrats	John Kenyon	1,154	33.4	−12.9
Labour	Majella Kennedy	906	26.2	+7.3
Green	Michael Leigh	183	5.3	+2.2
Majority		61	1.8	−12.8
Turnout		3,458	44.1	−22.2
Conservative gain from Liberal Democrats		Swing		

=== May 2010 ===
2010
Party	Candidate	Votes	%	±%
Liberal Democrats	Tony Fishwick*	2,399	46.3	−11.9
Conservative	Richard Peers	1,644	31.7	+0.7
Labour	Thom Shelton	977	18.9	+12.0
Green	Michael Leigh	161	3.1	−0.8
Majority		755	14.6	−12.6
Turnout		5,181	66.3	+25.2
Liberal Democrats hold		Swing		

== Elections in 2000s ==
=== May 2008 ===
2008
Party	Candidate	Votes	%	±%
Liberal Democrats	Ray Bowker*	1,883	58.2	+8.5
Conservative	Jacki Wilkinson	1,003	31.0	−5.4
Labour	Thomas Shelton	224	6.9	−2.8
Green	Michael Leigh	126	3.9	−0.3
Majority		880	27.2	+14
Turnout		3,236	41.1	+1.0
Liberal Democrats hold		Swing		

=== May 2007 ===
2007
Party	Candidate	Votes	%	±%
Liberal Democrats	Hazel Bowker	1,534	49.7	+0.4
Conservative	Chris Candish	1,125	36.4	+2.3
Labour	Leon Thomas	299	9.7	−1.9
Green	Michael Leigh	130	4.2	−0.8
Majority		409	13.2	−2.0
Turnout		3,088	40.1	+1.9
Liberal Democrats hold		Swing		

=== May 2006 ===
2006
Party	Candidate	Votes	%	±%
Liberal Democrats	Douglas Fishwick*	1,390	49.3	−9.0
Conservative	Peter Cameron	962	34.1	−0.9
Labour	Stephanie Crean	326	11.6	+4.8
Green	Erica Wright	142	5.0	+5.0
Majority		428	15.2	−0.8
Turnout		2,820	38.2	−8.9
Liberal Democrats hold		Swing		

=== May 2004 ===
2004 (after boundary changes)
Party	Candidate	Votes	%	±%
Liberal Democrats	Raymond Bowker*	1,875	21.3	
Liberal Democrats	Jane Brophy*	1,672	19.0	
Liberal Democrats	Douglas Fishwick*	1,589	18.0	
Conservative	Kenneth Bullman	1,119	12.7	
Conservative	David Pate	1,006	11.4	
Conservative	Clive Feingold	958	10.9	
Labour	Tom Ross	603	6.8	
Turnout		8,822	47.1	
Liberal Democrats win (new seat)				
Liberal Democrats win (new seat)				
Liberal Democrats win (new seat)				

=== May 2003 ===
2003
Party	Candidate	Votes	%	±%
Liberal Democrats	Jane Brophy	2,454	48.7	−16.4
Conservative	David Pate	1,785	35.4	+0.5
Labour	Martin Williams	800	15.9	+15.9
Majority		669	13.3	−16.9
Turnout		5,039	54.3	+3.7
Liberal Democrats hold		Swing		

=== May 2002 ===
2002
Party	Candidate	Votes	%	±%
Liberal Democrats	Douglas Fishwick	3,070	65.1	+9.8
Conservative	Patricia Morris	1,648	34.9	+0.5
Majority		1,422	30.2	+9.3
Turnout		4,718	50.6	+12.5
Liberal Democrats hold		Swing		

=== May 2000 ===
2000
Party	Candidate	Votes	%	±%
Liberal Democrats	Raymond Bowker*	1,932	55.3	+6.3
Conservative	Ian Mullins	1,202	34.4	−0.2
Labour	Andrew McNee	359	10.3	−6.1
Majority		730	20.9	+6.5
Turnout		3,493	38.1	+2.5
Liberal Democrats hold		Swing		

== Elections in 1990s ==
1999
Party	Candidate	Votes	%	±%
Liberal Democrats	BV Ackroyd*	1,640	49.0	+5.9
Conservative	Scholar	1,158	34.6	−4.1
Labour	Harrison	549	16.4	−1.8
Majority		482	14.4	+10.0
Turnout		3,347	35.6	+1.2
Liberal Democrats hold		Swing		

1998
Party	Candidate	Votes	%	±%
Liberal Democrats	M. D. Cragg	1,400	43.1	−16.4
Conservative	R. G. Strafford	1,258	38.7	+14.6
Labour	M. E. Rose	593	18.2	+1.8
Majority		142	4.4	−31.0
Turnout		3,251	34.4	−1.0
Liberal Democrats hold		Swing		

1996
Party	Candidate	Votes	%	±%
Liberal Democrats	R. Bowker*	2,377	59.5	+11.7
Conservative	H. Scholar	961	24.1	−7.2
Labour	S. N. Humby	657	16.4	−4.5
Majority		1,416	35.4	+19.0
Turnout		3,995	42.5	0
Liberal Democrats hold		Swing		

1995
Party	Candidate	Votes	%	±%
Liberal Democrats	B. V. Ackroyd*	2,075	47.8	+0.2
Conservative	A. Bowker	1,361	31.3	−1.5
Labour	S. N. Humby	909	20.9	+1.3
Majority		714	16.4	+1.6
Turnout		4,345	42.5	−7.0
Liberal Democrats hold		Swing		

1994
Party	Candidate	Votes	%	±%
Liberal Democrats	J. E. Brophy	2,186	47.6	−0.9
Conservative	A. Bowker*	1,505	32.8	+0.6
Labour	S. N. Humby	899	19.6	+0.3
Majority		681	14.8	−1.5
Turnout		4,590	49.5	+1.8
Liberal Democrats gain from Conservative		Swing		

1992
Party	Candidate	Votes	%	±%
Liberal Democrats	R. Bowker*	2,265	48.5	+10.2
Conservative	M. E. King	1,505	32.2	−4.0
Labour	R. W. J. Small	899	19.3	−6.2
Majority		760	16.3	+14.3
Turnout		4,669	47.7	−5.5
Liberal Democrats hold		Swing		

1991
Party	Candidate	Votes	%	±%
Liberal Democrats	B. V. Ackroyd	1,675	38.3	+9.3
Conservative	R. J. M. Bishop	1,586	36.2	+0.6
Labour	D. R. Holland	1,115	25.5	−7.2
Majority		89	2.0	−0.8
Turnout		4,376	53.2	−1.8
Liberal Democrats gain from Conservative		Swing		

1990
Party	Candidate	Votes	%	±%
Conservative	A. Bowker	1,625	35.6	−0.9
Labour	D. R. Holland	1,495	32.7	+13.8
Liberal Democrats	C. S. Fink	1,326	29.0	−14.1
Green	E. A. Wright	120	2.6	+1.1
Majority		130	2.8	−3.8
Turnout		4,566	55.0	+5.1
Conservative gain from Liberal Democrats		Swing		

== Elections in 1980s ==
1988
Party	Candidate	Votes	%	±%
Liberal Democrats	R. Bowker*	1,818	43.1	+5.1
Conservative	R. G. B. Walsh	1,539	36.5	−4.5
Labour	D. R. Holland	799	18.9	−1.0
Green	E. A. Wright	64	1.5	+0.3
Majority		279	6.6	+3.6
Turnout		4,220	49.9	−4.1
Liberal Democrats hold		Swing		

1987
Party	Candidate	Votes	%	±%
Conservative	M. J. Booth	1,875	41.0	+11.1
Liberal	C. H. Gibson	1,737	38.0	−6.1
Labour	M. C. Jenkinson	909	19.9	−6.1
Green	K. R. Robinson	56	1.2	+1.2
Majority		138	3.0	−11.2
Turnout		4,577	54.0	+6.5
Conservative hold		Swing		

1986
Party	Candidate	Votes	%	±%
Liberal	M. D. Cragg	1,780	44.1	−4.4
Conservative	M. J. Booth	1,207	29.9	−1.5
Labour	M. C. Jenkinson	1,052	26.0	+5.9
Majority		573	14.2	−2.9
Turnout		4,039	47.5	−2.2
Liberal hold		Swing		

1984
Party	Candidate	Votes	%	±%
Liberal	R. Bowker*	2,039	48.5	+13.4
Conservative	J. F. Burke	1,320	31.4	−6.7
Labour	E. A. Starkey	847	20.1	−6.7
Majority		719	17.1	+14.1
Turnout		4,206	49.7	−2.1
Liberal hold		Swing		

1983
Party	Candidate	Votes	%	±%
Conservative	D. Merrell	1,643	38.1	+2.2
Alliance	R. B. Slack*	1,515	35.1	−9.2
Labour	E. A. Starkey	1,157	26.8	+7.0
Majority		128	3.0	−5.4
Turnout		4,315	51.8	+8.5
Conservative gain from Liberal		Swing		

1982
Party	Candidate	Votes	%	±%
Liberal	B. V. Ackroyd	1,617	44.3	+7.8
Conservative	W. J. Watkins*	1,312	35.9	+2.1
Labour	R. Crewe	721	19.8	−9.9
Majority		305	8.4	+5.6
Turnout		3,650	43.3	−6.9
Liberal gain from Conservative		Swing		

By-Election 18 March 1982
Party	Candidate	Votes	%	±%
Liberal	R. B. Slack	1,338	38.6	+2.1
Conservative	D. Merrell	1,138	32.9	−0.9
Labour	R. Crewe	988	28.5	−1.2
Majority		200	5.8	+3.0
Turnout		3,464	41.2	−9.0
Liberal gain from Conservative		Swing		

1980
Party	Candidate	Votes	%	±%
Liberal	R. Bowker	1,495	36.5	+16.4
Conservative	A. R. Weedall*	1,382	33.8	−14.9
Labour	R. J. Short	1,215	29.7	−1.5
Majority		113	2.8	−0.5
Turnout		4,092	50.2	+15.5
Liberal gain from Conservative		Swing		

== Elections in 1970s ==
1979
Party	Candidate	Votes	%	±%
Conservative	G. K. Toft	2,756	25.3	−18.6
Conservative	W. J. Watkins	2,550	23.4	−22.4
Liberal	R. Bowker	2,190	20.1	+20.1
Labour	B. Brotherton	1,718	15.8	+0.8
Labour	P. Pollard	1,680	15.4	0
Majority		360	3.3	−35.1
Turnout		10,894	65.7	+34.5
Conservative hold		Swing		
Conservative hold		Swing		

1978
Party	Candidate	Votes	%	±%
Conservative	L. E. W. McCowatt	1,746	69.2	+21.6
Labour	C. Moore	777	30.8	+6.0
Majority		969	38.4	+18.4
Turnout		2,523	31.2	−13.3
Conservative hold		Swing		

By-Election 14 October 1976
Party	Candidate	Votes	%	±%
Conservative	R. Holden	1,307	67.1	+19.5
Labour	J. Gregory	640	32.9	+8.1
Majority		667	34.3	+11.5
Turnout		1,947	24.3	−20.2
Conservative gain from Labour		Swing		

1976
Party	Candidate	Votes	%	±%
Conservative	A. R. Weedall	1,695	47.6	−0.3
Liberal	R. Bowker*	983	27.6	+5.8
Labour	J. Gregory	884	24.8	−5.4
Majority		712	20.0	+2.3
Turnout		3,562	44.5	+1.9
Conservative gain from Liberal		Swing		

1975
Party	Candidate	Votes	%	±%
Conservative	J. C. Robertson	1,626	47.9	+17.0
Labour	J. Webb	1,026	30.2	−4.7
Liberal	C. R. Gibson	741	21.8	−9.9
Majority		600	17.7	+17.0
Turnout		3,393	42.6	−1.1
Conservative gain from Labour		Swing		

1973
Party	Candidate	Votes	%	±%
Labour	H. Wharton	1,283	34.9	
Liberal	R. Bowker	1,168	31.7	
Labour	V. Collett	1,165	31.7	
Conservative	A. Weedall	1,138	30.9	
Conservative	R. Hall	1,076	29.2	
Labour	K. Warrington	1,041	28.3	
Liberal	A. Beswick	1,008	27.4	
Liberal	T. Ballard	999	27.2	
Conservative	R. Alcock	935	25.4	
Communist	L. Whitney	90	2.4	
Majority		27	0.7	
Turnout		3,679	43.7	
Labour win (new seat)				
Liberal win (new seat)				
Labour win (new seat)				
