= Timperley (ward) =

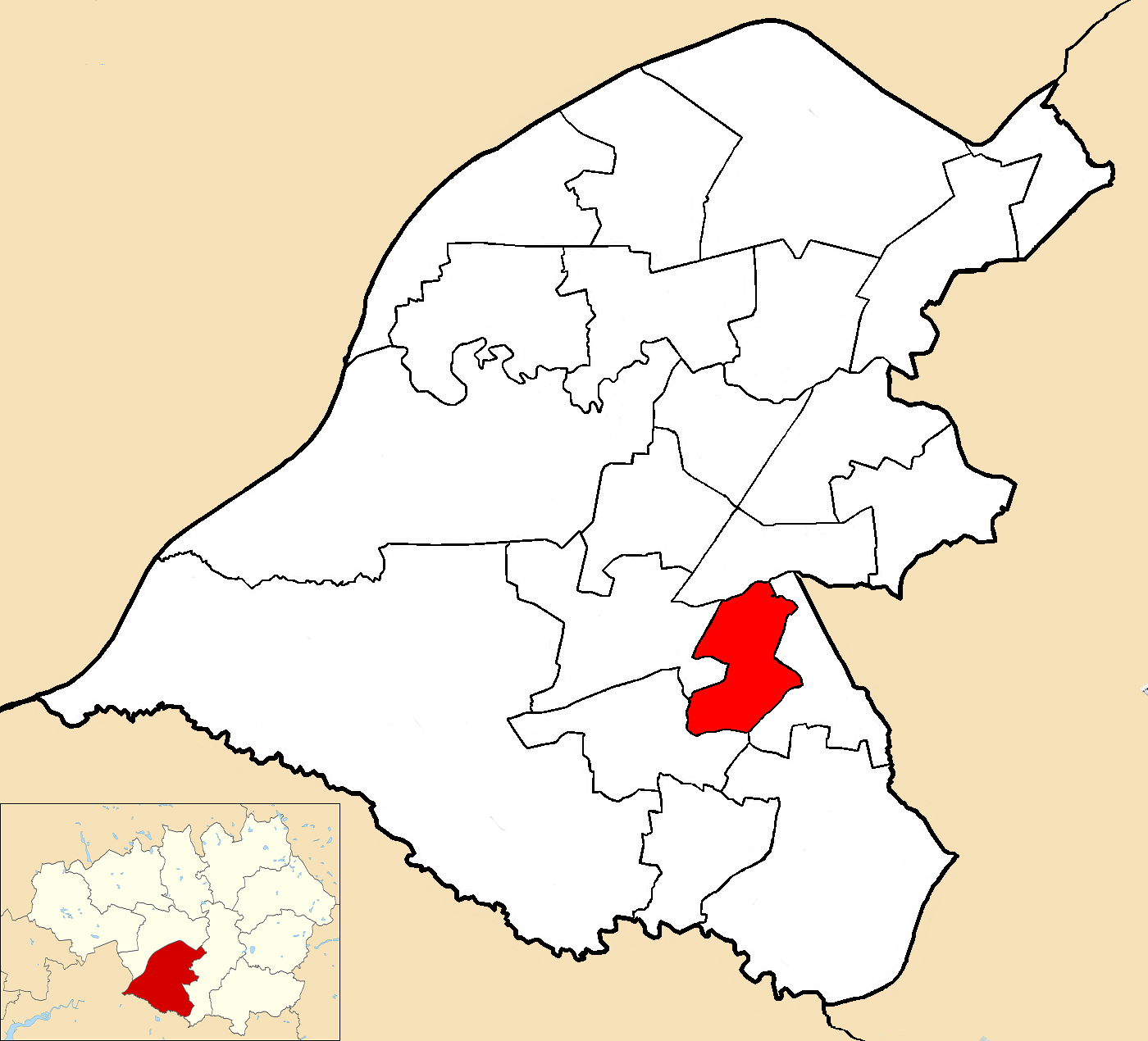
- Timperley within Trafford
- Population: 11,201
- Metropolitan borough: Trafford
- Metropolitan county: Greater Manchester
- Country: England
- Sovereign state: United Kingdom
- UK Parliament: Altrincham and Sale West
- Councillors: Will Frass (Lib Dem); Meena Minnis (Lib Dem); Jane Brophy (Lib Dem)

Timperley was an electoral ward of Trafford, Greater Manchester, covering the western part of Timperley.

== Councillors ==
Will Frass (Liberal Democrat)

Meena Minnis (Liberal Democrat)

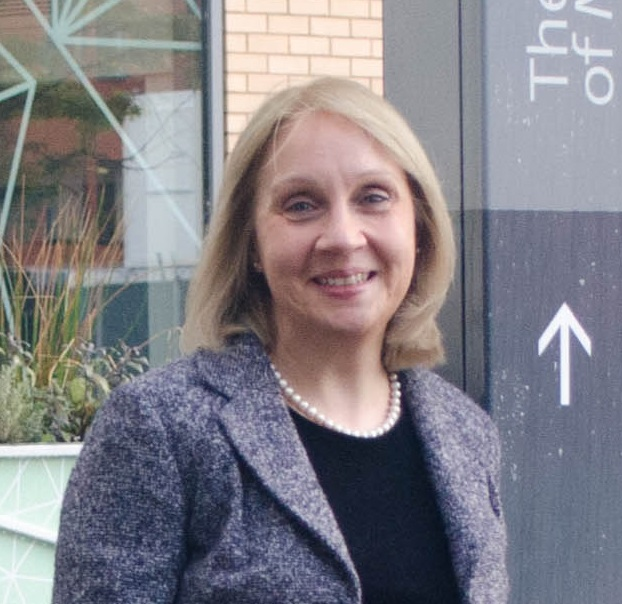
Jane Brophy (Liberal Democrat)

Election	Councillor	Councillor	Councillor
1973	John Davenport (Lib)	Michael Farnsworth (Lib)	J. Richardson (Lib)
1975	John Davenport (Lib)	Michael Farnsworth (Lib)	P. Leigh (Con)
1976	John Davenport (Lib)	Roy Hall (Con)	P. Leigh (Con)
1978	Graham Burrows (Con)	Roy Hall (Con)	Hazel Taylor (Con)
1979	Graham Burrows (Con)	Roy Hall (Con)	Hazel Taylor (Con)
1980	Graham Burrows (Con)	Roy Hall (Con)	Hazel Taylor (Con)
1982	Ken Davies (Con)	L. Hillier (Con)	Hazel Taylor (Con)
Jul 1982	Ken Davies (Con)	L. Hillier (Con)	Wilfred Watkins (Con)
1983	Ken Davies (Con)	L. Hillier (Con)	Wilfred Watkins (Con)
1984	Ken Davies (Con)	John Davenport (Lib)	Wilfred Watkins (Con)
1986	Michael Farnsworth (Lib)	John Davenport (Lib)	Wilfred Watkins (Con)
1987	Michael Farnsworth (Lib)	John Davenport (Lib)	Wilfred Watkins (Con)
1988	Michael Farnsworth (SLD)	Ken Davies (Con)	Wilfred Watkins (Con)
1990	Pam Dixon (Con)	Ken Davies (Con)	Harry Scholar (Con)
1991	Pam Dixon (Con)	Ken Davies (Con)	Harry Scholar (Con)
1992	Pam Dixon (Con)	Ken Davies (Con)	Harry Scholar (Con)
1994	David Horstead (Lib Dem)	Ken Davies (Con)	Harry Scholar (Con)
1995	David Horstead (Lib Dem)	Ken Davies (Con)	Angela Bruer-Morris (Lib Dem)
1996	David Horstead (Lib Dem)	Ken Davies (Con)	Angela Bruer-Morris (Lib Dem)
1998	Anne Bowker (Con)	Ken Davies (Con)	Angela Bruer-Morris (Lib Dem)
1999	Anne Bowker (Con)	Ken Davies (Con)	Mauline Akins (Con)
2000	Anne Bowker (Con)	Ken Davies (Con)	Mauline Akins (Con)
2002	Anne Bowker (Con)	Ken Davies (Con)	Mauline Akins (Con)
2003	Anne Bowker (Con)	Ken Davies (Con)	Mauline Akins (Con)
Jun 2004	Anne Bowker (Con)	Matthew Colledge (Con)	Ken Davies (Con)
Nov 2004	Ken Bullman (Con)	Matthew Colledge (Con)	Ken Davies (Con)
2006	Ken Bullman (Con)	Matthew Colledge (Con)	Neil Taylor (Lib Dem)
2007	Ken Bullman (Con)	Matthew Colledge (Con)	Neil Taylor (Lib Dem)
2008	Jane Brophy (Lib Dem)	Matthew Colledge (Con)	Neil Taylor (Lib Dem)
2010	Jane Brophy (Lib Dem)	Matthew Colledge (Con)	Neil Taylor (Lib Dem)
2011	Jane Brophy (Lib Dem)	Angela Bruer-Morris (Con)	Neil Taylor (Lib Dem)
2012	Jane Brophy (Lib Dem)	Angela Bruer-Morris (Con)	Neil Taylor (Lib Dem)
2014	Jane Brophy (Lib Dem)	Angela Bruer-Morris (Con)	Nathan Evans (Con)
2015	Jane Brophy (Lib Dem)	Angela Bruer-Morris (Con)	Nathan Evans (Con)
2016	Jane Brophy (Lib Dem)	Angela Bruer-Morris (Con)	Nathan Evans (Con)
2018	Jane Brophy (Lib Dem)	Angela Bruer-Morris (Con)	Nathan Evans (Con)
2019	Jane Brophy (Lib Dem)	Meena Minnis (Lib Dem)	Nathan Evans (Con)
2021	Jane Brophy (Lib Dem)	Meena Minnis (Lib Dem)	Nathan Evans (Con)
2022	Jane Brophy (Lib Dem)	Meena Minnis (Lib Dem)	Will Frass (Lib Dem)

indicates seat up for re-election. indicates by-election.

== Elections in the 2020s ==
=== May 2022 ===
2022
Party	Candidate	Votes	%	±%
Liberal Democrats	Will Frass	2,182	51.4	
Conservative	Nathan Evans*	1,413	33.3	
Labour	Ulrich Savary	438	10.3	
Green	Dan Kyle	205	4.8	
Majority		769	18.1	
Registered electors		8,285		
Turnout		4,249	51.3	
Liberal Democrats gain from Conservative		Swing		

=== May 2021 ===
2021
Party	Candidate	Votes	%	±%
Liberal Democrats	Jane Brophy*	1,762	39.9	
Conservative	Stuart Donnelly	1,528	34.6	
Labour	Adam Legg	799	18.1	
Green	Jadwiga Leigh	298	6.7	
Majority		234	5.3	
Rejected ballots		31		
Registered electors		8,353		
Turnout		4,418	52.9	
Liberal Democrats hold		Swing		

== Elections in 2010s ==
=== May 2019 ===
2019
Party	Candidate	Votes	%	±%
Liberal Democrats	Meena Minnis	1,653	42.4	▲10.7
Conservative	Angela Bruer-Morris*	1,266	32.5	▼7.9
Green	Jadwiga Leigh	423	10.9	▲8.2
Liberal	Neil Taylor	367	9.4	▲1.2
UKIP	Pauline Royle	187	4.8	N/A
Majority		387	9.9	▲1.2
Registered electors		8,410		
Turnout		3,896	46.33	▼3.3
Liberal Democrats gain from Conservative		Swing		

=== May 2018 ===
2018
Party	Candidate	Votes	%	±%
Conservative	Nathan Evans*	1,694	40.4	+7.1
Liberal Democrats	William Jones	1,329	31.7	−20.4
Labour	Julia Garlick	718	17.1	+6.7
Liberal	Neil Taylor	342	8.2	+8.2
Green	Jadwiga Leigh	113	2.7	−1.4
Majority		365	8.7	
Turnout		4,196	49.6	−0.6
Conservative hold		Swing		

=== May 2016 ===
2016
Party	Candidate	Votes	%	±%
Liberal Democrats	Jane Brophy*	2,176	52.1	+23.1
Conservative	Carol Mounfield	1,388	33.3	−12.9
Labour	Mohammed Ahmed	436	10.4	−8.5
Green	Jadwiga Leigh	173	4.1	−1.7
Majority		788	18.9	+1.7
Turnout		4,184	50.2	−24.7
Liberal Democrats hold		Swing		

=== May 2015 ===
2015
Party	Candidate	Votes	%	±%
Conservative	Angela Bruer-Morris*	2,911	46.2	+7.4
Liberal Democrats	William Jones	1,827	29.0	−8.3
Labour	Mal Choudhury	1,189	18.9	+1.9
Green	Jad Leigh	368	5.8	−1.1
Majority		1,084	17.2	+15.7
Turnout		6,295	74.9	+24.3
Conservative hold		Swing		

=== May 2014 ===
2014
Party	Candidate	Votes	%	±%
Conservative	Nathan Evans	1,419	38.8	+4.0
Liberal Democrats	Neil Taylor*	1,363	37.3	−6.1
Labour	Majella Dalton-Bartley	622	17.0	−0.6
Green	Jadwiga Leigh	253	6.9	+2.7
Majority		56	1.5	+5.6
Turnout		3,657	43.0	
Conservative gain from Liberal Democrats		Swing		

=== May 2012 ===
2012
Party	Candidate	Votes	%	±%
Liberal Democrats	Jane Brophy*	1,553	43.4	+12.4
Conservative	Mal Choudhury	1,246	34.8	−8.0
Labour	Majella Dalton-Bartley	630	17.6	−4.1
Green	Jadwiga Leigh	150	4.2	−0.3
Majority		307	8.6	−3.2
Turnout		3,579	42.9	−7.7
Liberal Democrats hold		Swing		

=== May 2011 ===
2011
Party	Candidate	Votes	%	±%
Conservative	Angela Bruer-Morris	1,820	42.8	+4.9
Liberal Democrats	Pauline Cliff	1,318	31.0	−11.0
Labour	Peter Baugh	924	21.7	+8.0
Green	Jadwiga Leigh	191	4.5	+2.2
Majority		502	11.8	+7.8
Turnout		4,253	50.6	−24.2
Conservative hold		Swing		

=== May 2010 ===
2010
Party	Candidate	Votes	%	±%
Liberal Democrats	Neil Taylor*	2,638	42.0	−7.9
Conservative	Angela Bruer-Morris	2,384	37.9	−4.4
Labour	Margaret Westhead	863	13.7	+8.1
UKIP	Ken Bullman	253	4.0	+4.0
Green	Jadwiga Leigh	144	2.3	+0.1
Majority		254	4.0	−3.5
Turnout		6,282	74.8	+22.8
Liberal Democrats hold		Swing		

== Elections in 2000s ==
=== May 2008 ===
2008
Party	Candidate	Votes	%	±%
Liberal Democrats	Jane Brophy	2,196	49.9	+2.4
Conservative	Darren Storey	1,864	42.3	−6.0
Labour	Peter Baugh	247	5.6	+5.6
Green	Jadwiga Leigh	97	2.2	−2.0
Majority		332	7.5	+6.7
Turnout		4,404	52.0	+2.7
Liberal Democrats gain from Conservative		Swing		

=== May 2007 ===
2007
Party	Candidate	Votes	%	±%
Conservative	Matthew Colledge*	1,955	48.3	+7.4
Liberal Democrats	Jane Brophy	1,924	47.5	+3.9
Green	Jadwiga Leigh	168	4.2	−0.8
Majority		31	0.8	−1.9
Turnout		4,047	49.3	+4.5
Conservative hold		Swing		

=== May 2006 ===
2006
Party	Candidate	Votes	%	±%
Liberal Democrats	Neil Taylor	1,610	43.6	+10.0
Conservative	Mohibul Choudhury	1,508	40.9	−17.4
Labour	Penelope Fraser	389	10.5	+2.3
Green	Martin Green	184	5.0	+5.0
Majority		102	2.7	−16.9
Turnout		3,691	44.8	−7.6
Liberal Democrats gain from Conservative		Swing		

=== November 2004 (by-election) ===
By-Election 25 November 2004
Party	Candidate	Votes	%	±%
Conservative	Ken Bullman	1,152	51.2	+1.8
Liberal Democrats	Ian Chappell	750	33.3	+2.5
Labour	Tom Ross	349	15.5	−4.5
Majority		402	17.9	−1.7
Turnout		2,251	27.3	−25.1
Conservative hold		Swing		

=== May 2004 ===
2004 (after boundary changes)
Party	Candidate	Votes	%	±%
Conservative	Anne Bowker*	2,145	20.1	
Conservative	Matthew Colledge	2,045	19.2	
Conservative	Arthur Davies*	2,025	19.0	
Liberal Democrats	Catherine Smith	1,329	12.5	
Liberal Democrats	Nichola Bairstow	1,277	12.0	
Liberal Democrats	Christopher Gaskell	970	9.1	
Labour	Peter Baugh	869	8.2	
Turnout		10,660	52.4	
Conservative win (new seat)				
Conservative win (new seat)				
Conservative win (new seat)				

=== May 2003 ===
2003
Party	Candidate	Votes	%	±%
Conservative	Mauline Akins*	2,461	54.0	+0.6
Liberal Democrats	Catherine Smith	2,099	46.0	−0.6
Majority		362	8.0	+1.2
Turnout		4,560	52.5	+0.1
Conservative hold		Swing		

=== May 2002 ===
2002
Party	Candidate	Votes	%	±%
Conservative	Anne Bowker*	2,426	53.4	−0.1
Liberal Democrats	Catherine Smith	2,120	46.6	+18.6
Majority		306	6.8	−18.7
Turnout		4,546	52.4	+18.4
Conservative hold		Swing		

=== May 2000 ===
2000
Party	Candidate	Votes	%	±%
Conservative	Arthur Davies*	1,611	53.5	+7.3
Liberal Democrats	Catherine Smith	845	28.0	−1.5
Labour	Mary Atherton	558	18.5	−5.9
Majority		766	25.5	+8.8
Turnout		3,014	34.0	−1.2
Conservative hold		Swing		

== Elections in 1990s ==
1999
Party	Candidate	Votes	%	±%
Conservative	Akins	1,431	46.2	+0.4
Liberal Democrats	Bruer-Morris*	915	29.5	+2.1
Labour	Atherton	755	24.4	−2.4
Majority		516	16.7	−1.7
Turnout		3,101	35.2	+0.6
Conservative gain from Liberal Democrats		Swing		

1998
Party	Candidate	Votes	%	±%
Conservative	A. Bowker	1,414	45.8	+4.8
Liberal Democrats	D. C. R. Horstead*	844	27.4	−8.0
Labour	M. E. Atherton	827	26.8	+3.2
Majority		570	18.4	
Turnout		3,085	34.6	−6.2
Conservative gain from Liberal Democrats		Swing		

1996
Party	Candidate	Votes	%	±%
Conservative	A. K. Davies*	1,453	41.0	+3.6
Liberal Democrats	C. Smith	1,257	35.4	−4.9
Labour	A. P. Roberts	836	23.6	+1.3
Majority		196	5.5	−2.6
Turnout		3,546	40.8	−3.4
Conservative hold		Swing		

1995
Party	Candidate	Votes	%	±%
Liberal Democrats	A. M. Bruer-Morris	1,508	40.3	+0.3
Conservative	H. Scholar*	1,400	37.4	−0.9
Labour	H. K. Western	836	22.3	−0.6
Majority		108	2.9	+1.1
Turnout		3,744	44.2	−4.1
Liberal Democrats gain from Conservative		Swing		

1994
Party	Candidate	Votes	%	±%
Liberal Democrats	D. C. R. Horstead	1,684	40.0	+13.2
Conservative	P. A. Dixon*	1,610	38.3	−17.6
Labour	A. D. McNee	912	21.7	+4.4
Majority		74	1.8	−27.3
Turnout		4,206	48.3	+6.3
Liberal Democrats gain from Conservative		Swing		

1992
Party	Candidate	Votes	%	±%
Conservative	A. K. Davies*	2,052	55.9	+3.4
Liberal Democrats	J. E. Brophy	984	26.8	+4.0
Labour	T. G. Crewe	637	17.3	−7.5
Majority		1,068	29.1	+1.4
Turnout		3,673	42.0	−5.3
Conservative hold		Swing		

1991
Party	Candidate	Votes	%	±%
Conservative	H. Scholar*	2,160	52.5	+5.7
Labour	R. W. J. Small	1,021	24.8	−5.2
Liberal Democrats	J. E. Brophy	937	22.8	−3.4
Majority		1,139	27.7	+20.5
Turnout		4,118	47.3	−3.2
Conservative hold		Swing		

1990 (2 vacancies)
Party	Candidate	Votes	%	±%
Conservative	P. A. Dixon	1,939	23.5	−3.1
Conservative	H. Scholar	1,918	23.3	−3.5
Labour	A. D. McNee	1,328	16.1	+14.7
Labour	R. W. J. Small	1,142	13.9	+10.3
Liberal Democrats	M. E. Clarke	835	10.1	−9.8
Liberal Democrats	D. C. R. Horstead	770	9.3	−11.4
Green	K. R. Robinson	310	3.8	+1.5
Majority		590	7.2	−5.7
Turnout		8,242	50.5	+4.0
Conservative gain from Liberal Democrats		Swing		
Conservative hold		Swing		

== Elections in 1980s ==
1988
Party	Candidate	Votes	%	±%
Conservative	A. K. Davies	2,075	50.1	+1.3
Liberal Democrats	J. W. Davenport*	1,242	30.0	−5.6
Labour	M. E. Atherton	726	17.5	+3.6
Green	K. R. Robinson	97	2.3	+0.2
Majority		833	20.1	+6.9
Turnout		4,140	46.5	−7.1
Conservative gain from Liberal Democrats		Swing		

1987
Party	Candidate	Votes	%	±%
Conservative	W. J. Watkins*	2,337	48.8	+10.0
Liberal	M. Clancy	1,704	35.6	−5.6
Labour	D. R. Holland	650	13.6	−6.4
Green	N. J. Eadie	101	2.1	+2.1
Majority		633	13.2	+10.8
Turnout		4,792	53.6	+9.4
Conservative hold		Swing		

1986
Party	Candidate	Votes	%	±%
Liberal	M. R. Farnsworth	1,628	41.2	−3.9
Conservative	A. K. Davies*	1,534	38.8	+3.3
Labour	A. D. McNee	792	20.0	+0.5
Majority		94	2.4	−7.2
Turnout		3,954	44.2	+5.1
Liberal gain from Conservative		Swing		

1984 (postponed election held 28 June 1984)
Party	Candidate	Votes	%	±%
Liberal	J. W. Davenport	1,590	45.1	+3.5
Conservative	A. Rhodes	1,252	35.5	−9.9
Labour	A. G. Hodson	687	19.5	+6.5
Majority		338	9.6	+5.8
Turnout		3,529	39.1	−10.0
Liberal gain from Conservative		Swing		

1983
Party	Candidate	Votes	%	±%
Conservative	W. J. Watkins*	2,003	45.4	−0.2
Alliance	G. K. Stuart	1,834	41.6	−1.5
Labour	R. Crewe	575	13.0	+1.8
Majority		169	3.8	+3.8
Turnout		4,412	49.1	+3.7
Conservative hold		Swing		

By-Election 8 July 1982
Party	Candidate	Votes	%	±%
Conservative	W. J. Watkins	1,433	47.3	−1.7
Liberal	G. K. Stuart	1,388	45.8	−2.6
Labour	R. J. Short	208	6.9	+4.3
Majority		45	1.5	+1.4
Turnout		3,029	33.8	−11.6
Conservative hold		Swing		

1982 (2 vacancies)
Party	Candidate	Votes	%	±%
Conservative	A. K. Davies	1,778	23.3	+2.9
Conservative	L. W. Hillier	1,698	22.3	+0.9
Liberal	G. K. Stuart	1,695	22.2	+8.4
Liberal	J. R. Richardson	1,595	20.9	+5.8
Labour	R. J. Short	441	5.8	−8.7
Labour	R. P. F. Phillips	412	5.4	−9.5
Majority		3	0.04	−7.7
Turnout		7,619	45.4	+4.2
Conservative hold		Swing		
Conservative hold		Swing		

1980
Party	Candidate	Votes	%	±%
Conservative	R. Hall*	1,590	43.7	−6.9
Liberal	M. R. Farnsworth	1,309	36.0	−13.4
Labour	E. Axon	739	20.3	+20.3
Majority		281	7.7	+6.4
Turnout		3,638	41.2	−35.2
Conservative hold		Swing		

== Elections in 1970s ==
1979
Party	Candidate	Votes	%	±%
Conservative	H. Taylor*	3,608	50.6	−6.5
Liberal	J. R. Richardson	3,516	49.4	+18.1
Majority		92	1.3	−10.3
Turnout		7,124	76.4	+38.6
Conservative hold		Swing		

1978 (2 vacancies)
Party	Candidate	Votes	%	±%
Conservative	G. V. Burrows	1,993	29.1	+3.7
Conservative	H. Taylor	1,922	28.0	+1.5
Liberal	J. W. Davenport*	1,126	16.4	+4.4
Liberal	M. Clancy	1,019	14.9	+1.4
Labour	J. R. Royle	402	5.9	−5.2
Labour	R. J. Ellis	394	5.7	−5.6
Majority		796	11.6	−14.5
Turnout		6,856	37.8	−4.8
Conservative gain from Liberal		Swing		
Conservative hold		Swing		

1976
Party	Candidate	Votes	%	±%
Conservative	H. Hall	2,209	54.5	+6.8
Liberal	G. K. Stuart	1,153	28.4	−8.9
Labour	R. G. Coulthard	691	17.0	+2.0
Majority		1,056	26.1	+15.6
Turnout		4,053	42.6	−2.2
Conservative gain from Liberal		Swing		

1975
Party	Candidate	Votes	%	±%
Conservative	P. Leigh	2,016	47.7	
Liberal	J. R. Richardson*	1,574	37.3	
Labour	J. Gregory	632	15.0	
Majority		442	10.5	
Turnout		4,222	44.8	
Conservative gain from Liberal		Swing		

1973
Party	Candidate	Votes	%	±%
Liberal	J. W. Davenport	1,748	42.3	
Liberal	M. R. Farnsworth	1,711		
Liberal	J. R. Richardson	1,700		
Conservative	P. Leigh	1,504	36.4	
Conservative	P. Field	1,435		
Conservative	M. Brown	1,397		
Labour	P. Griffiths	881	21.3	
Labour	R. Coulthard	867		
Labour	D. Teasdale	859		
Majority		196		
Turnout		4,133	42.2	
Liberal win (new seat)				
Liberal win (new seat)				
Liberal win (new seat)				
