= Jane Brophy =

British politician

Cllr Jane Brophy
- Brophy in 2020

Trafford Metropolitan Borough Councillor for Timperley
- Incumbent
- Assumed office 1 May 2008
- Preceded by: Ken Bullman

Member of the European Parliament for North West England
- In office 2 July 2019 – 31 January 2020
- Preceded by: Sajjad Karim
- Succeeded by: Constituency abolished

Trafford Metropolitan Borough Councillor for Village
- In office 1 May 2003 – 4 May 2007
- Preceded by: B. Ackroyd
- Succeeded by: Helen Bowker

Personal details
- Born: Jane Elisabeth Brophy; 27 August 1963 (age 63) Manchester, Lancashire, England
- Party: Liberal Democrats
- Education: University of Leeds
- Occupation: Politician
- Profession: Dietician

Jane Elisabeth Brophy (born 27 August 1963) is a British politician who was a Liberal Democrats Member of the European Parliament (MEP) for North West England between 2019 and the United Kingdom's withdrawal from the EU on 31 January 2020. She sat as a full member on the Committee on Employment and Social Affairs and the Delegation for relations with the Federative Republic of Brazil. Brophy also sat as a substitute member on the Committee on the Environment, Public Health and Food Safety and Delegation for relations with Afghanistan.

She is a councillor and for the municipal year of 2025–26 she was Mayor of Trafford Council, a ceremonial position. She was the Liberal Democrat candidate in the 2017 Greater Manchester mayoral election, coming third with 6% of the vote. She is a member of the executive of Green Liberal Democrats. She stood as a Liberal Democrat in parliamentary elections for Eccles in 2005, Altrincham and Sale West in 2010, 2015 and 2017, and a by-election in Oldham West and Royton in 2015. She contested Altrincham and Sale West in the 2024 general election but came in fourth place.

Brophy is a dietician who specialises in the management of diabetes, and she has worked for the National Health Service (NHS). She is a former member of the British Dietetic Association board. She has a degree in Biochemistry.
