= 2027 Trafford Council election =

2027 English local government election

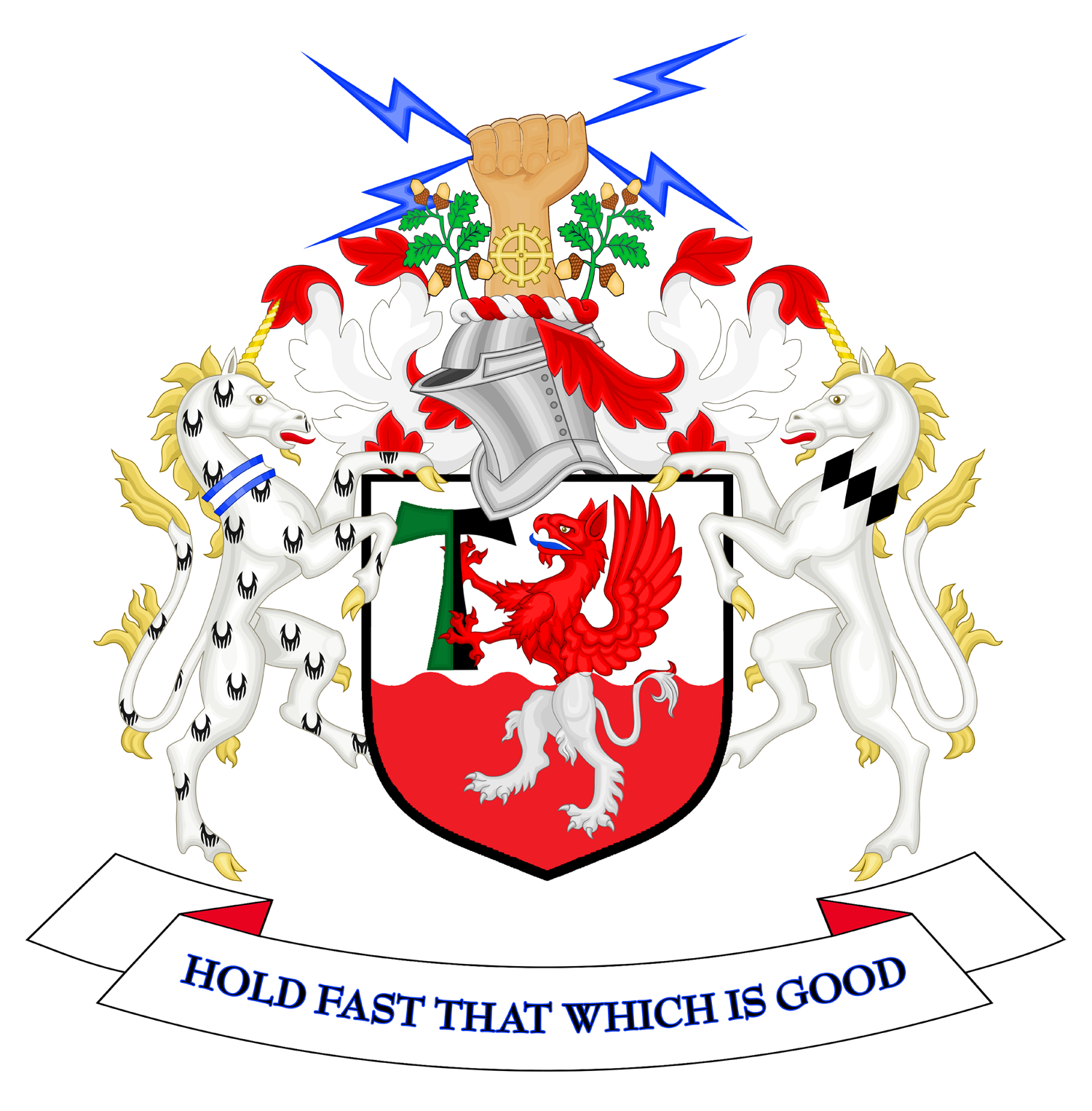
- 6 May 2027

21 out of 63 seats to Trafford Council 32 seats needed for a majority
Leader	Tom Ross	Nathan Evans	Geraldine Coggins
Party	Labour	Conservative	Green
Leader's seat	Stretford & Humphrey Park	Hale Barns & Timperley South	Altrincham
Last election	35 seats, 23.3%	12 seats, 23.2%	7 seats, 23.4%
Current seats	35	12	7
Leader	Shaun Ennis	Charlotte Waterworth
Party	Liberal Democrats	Reform
Leader's seat	Timperley Central	Bucklow-St. Martins
Last election	7 seats, 11.4%	2 seats, 2.3%
Current seats	7	2
Incumbent Leader
Tom Ross
Labour

The 2027 Trafford Council elections will be held on Thursday, 7 May 2027 alongside other local elections in the United Kingdom. 21 of the 63 seats will be contested, with each successful candidate elected to serve a four-year term of office expiring in 2031. Councillors up for re-election are those elected in 2023.

== Background ==
The Local Government Act 1972 created a two-tier system of metropolitan counties and districts covering Greater Manchester, Merseyside, South Yorkshire, Tyne and Wear, the West Midlands, and West Yorkshire starting in 1974. Trafford was a district of the Greater Manchester metropolitan county. The Local Government Act 1985 abolished the metropolitan counties, with metropolitan districts taking on most of their powers as metropolitan boroughs. The Greater Manchester Combined Authority was created in 2011 and began electing the mayor of Greater Manchester from 2017, which was given strategic powers covering a region coterminous with the former Greater Manchester metropolitan county.

In June 2022, the Local Government Boundary Commission for England made The Trafford (Electoral Changes) Order 2022, which officially abolished all 21 existing wards and established 21 new wards with new boundaries. All 63 Council seats were contested at the 2023 elections. The elected councillor who received the second-highest number of votes in each ward at the 2023 election had their seat contested in this election.

== Electoral process ==
The council elects its councillors in thirds, with a third being up for election every year for three years, with no election in the fourth year. The election will take place by first-past-the-post voting, with wards being represented by three councillors, with one elected in each election year to serve a four-year term.

All registered electors (British, Irish, Commonwealth and European Union citizens) living in Trafford aged 18 or over were entitled to vote in the election. People who lived at two addresses in different local authorities, such as university students with different term-time and holiday addresses, were entitled to be registered for elections in both local authorities. Voting in-person at polling stations will take place from 07:00 to 22:00 on election day, with voters able to apply for postal votes or proxy votes in advance of the election.
