= 2022 Trafford Metropolitan Borough Council election =

2022 local election in England

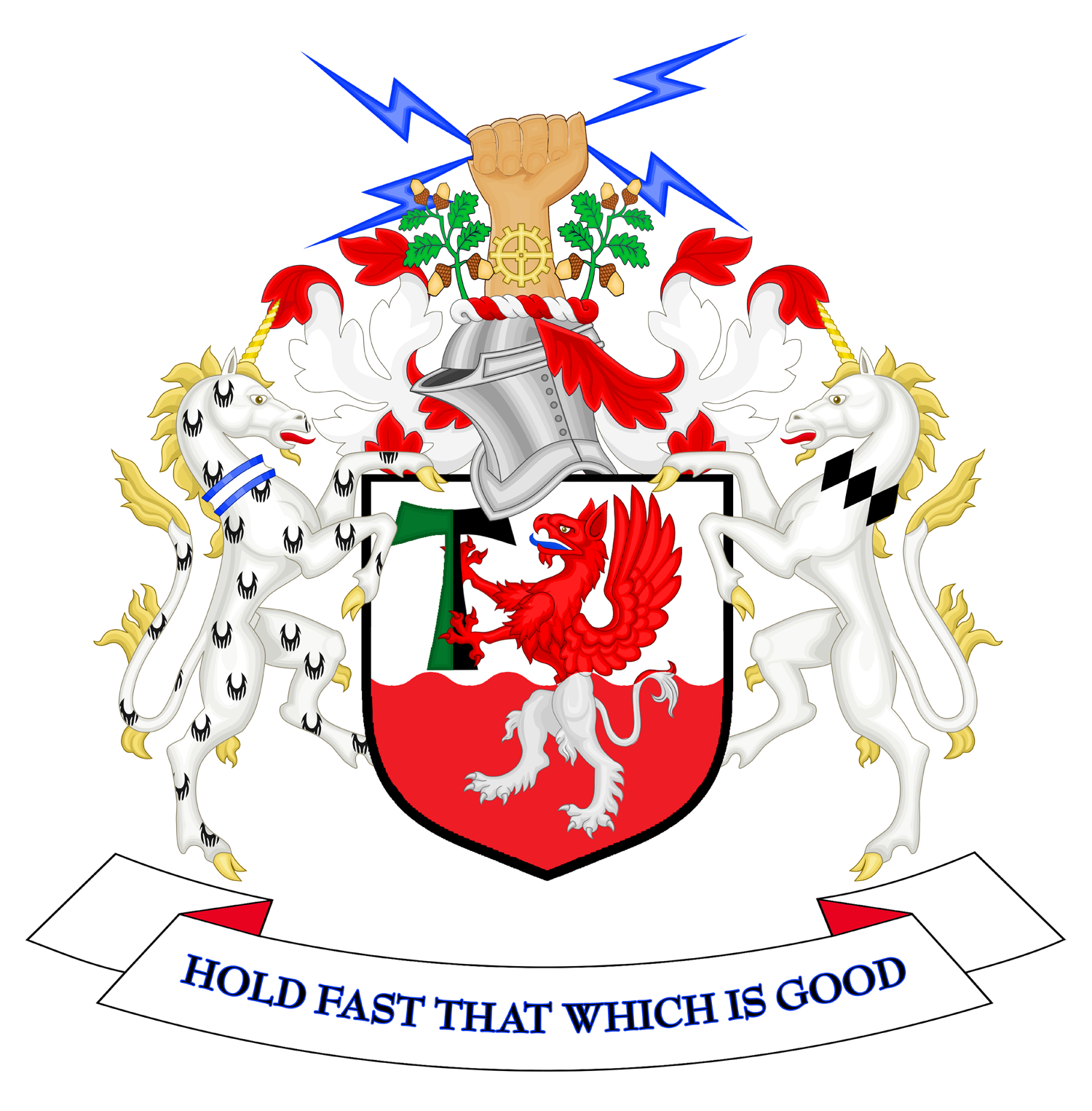
← 2021	5 May 2022	2023 →

22 of 63 seats to Trafford Metropolitan Borough Council 32 seats needed for a majority
	First party	Second party	Third party
Leader	Andrew Western	Nathan Evans	Julian Newgrosh
Party	Labour	Conservative	Liberal Democrats
Leader's seat	Priory	Timperley (defeated)	Village
Last election	16 seats, 45.5%	7 seats, 33.6%	1 seats, 8.0%
Seats before	40	17	3
Seats won	15	3	2
Seats after	41	13	5
Seat change	▲1	▼4	▲2
Popular vote	32,460	22,046	7,229
Percentage	45.1%	30.6%	10.1%
Swing	▼0.4%	▼3.0%	▲2.1%
	Fourth party
Leader	Dan Jerrome
Party	Green
Leader's seat	Altrincham
Last election	1 seats, 12.5%
Seats before	3
Seats won	2
Seats after	4
Seat change	▲1
Popular vote	9,720
Percentage	13.5%
Swing	▲1.0%
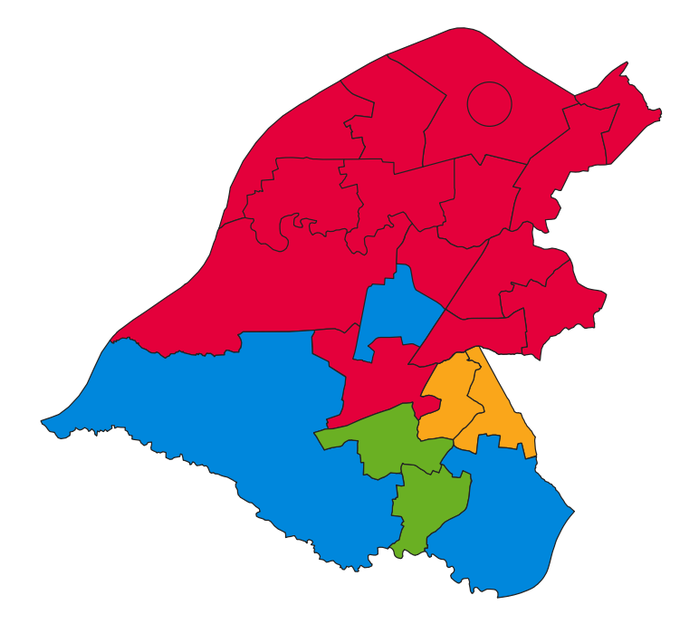
- Map of results of 2022 election
Leader of the Council before election
Andrew Western
Labour
Leader of the Council after election
Andrew Western
Labour

The 2022 Trafford Metropolitan Borough Council election to elect members of Trafford Metropolitan Borough Council in England took place on 5 May 2022. One third of the 63 seats were contested, with one additional seat also contested in Gorse Hill as a by-election owing to a councillor retiring mid-term. Each successful candidate will serve a one-year term of office rather than the normal four-year term due to a boundary review to be implemented in 2023.

== Election result ==
Party	Votes		Seats			Full Council	
Labour Party	32,460 (45.1%)	▼0.4	15 (68.2%)	15 / 22	▲1	41 (65.1%)	41 / 63
Conservative Party	22,046 (30.6%)	▼3.0	3 (13.6%)	3 / 22	▼4	13 (20.6%)	13 / 63
Liberal Democrats	7,229 (10.1%)	▲2.1	2 (9.1%)	2 / 22	▲1	5 (7.9%)	5 / 63
Green Party	9,720 (13.5%)	▲1.0	2 (9.1%)	2 / 22	▲1	4 (6.3%)	4 / 63
Independent	328 (0.5%)	▲0.4	0 (0.0%)	0 / 22	Steady	0 (0.0%)	0 / 63
Women's Equality Party	127 (0.2%)	Steady	0 (0.0%)	0 / 22	Steady	0 (0.0%)	0 / 63

↓
41	4	5	13

== Ward results ==
=== Altrincham ward ===
Altrincham
Party	Candidate	Votes	%	±%
Green	Daniel Jerrome*	2,354	60.6	▲4.8
Conservative	Anand Chinthala	947	24.4	▼4.3
Labour	Benjamin Slater	469	12.7	▼0.5
Liberal Democrats	Christopher Lovell	103	2.7	▲0.6
Majority		1,407	36.2	▲9.1
Registered electors		9,057		
Turnout		3,883	42.9	▼3.9
Green hold		Swing	5.1 ▲	

=== Ashton upon Mersey ward ===
Ashton upon Mersey
Party	Candidate	Votes	%	±%
Labour	Tony O’Brien	1,848	49.9	▲2.6
Conservative	Kay Dwyer	1,411	38.1	▼3.9
Green	Caroline Robertson-Brow	292	7.9	▲0.2
Liberal Democrats	David Kierman	148	4.0	▼2.9
Majority		437	11.8	▲6.6
Registered electors		7,633		
Turnout		3,702	48.5	▼5.0
Labour gain from Conservative		Swing	▲3.3	

=== Bowdon ward ===
Bowdon
Party	Candidate	Votes	%	±%
Conservative	Shengke Zhi	1,628	51.9	▼1.5
Green	Gareth Twose	826	26.3	▲6.2
Labour	Thomas Hague	450	14.3	▼5.5
Liberal Democrats	Ludo Tolhurst-Cleaver	221	7.0	▲0.3
Majority		802	25.6	▼7.7
Registered electors		7,274		
Turnout		3,136	43.1	▼3.3
Conservative hold		Swing	▼3.9	

=== Broadheath ward ===
Broadheath
Party	Candidate	Votes	%	±%
Labour	Amy Whyte*	1,894	44.9	▼4.0
Conservative	Kaushik Chakraborty	1,649	39.1	▲2.2
Liberal Democrats	Christopher Marritt	265	6.3	▲1.6
Green	Alexander Young	263	6.2	▼0.7
Independent	Stephen Farndon	140	3.3	▲0.7
Majority		245	5.8	
Registered electors		10,073		
Turnout		4,220	41.9	
Labour hold		Swing		

=== Brooklands ward ===
Brooklands
Party	Candidate	Votes	%	±%
Labour	Will Jones	1,953	49.9	▲5.5
Conservative	Adrian Hart	1,501	38.3	▼6.4
Green	Renate Aspden	247	6.3	▲1.0
Liberal Democrats	Pauline Cliff	202	5.2	▲2.3
Majority		452	11.5	
Registered electors		7,717		
Turnout		3,915	50.7	
Labour hold		Swing		

=== Bucklow-St. Martins ward ===
Bucklow-St. Martins
Party	Candidate	Votes	%	±%
Labour	Adele New*	1,282	66.0	▲5.7
Conservative	Gary Towers	443	22.8	▼5.5
Green	Rodrigo Paulo	111	5.7	▼1.4
Liberal Democrats	Simon Wright	87	4.5	▲0.3
Majority		839	43.2	
Registered electors		7,178		
Turnout		1,941	27.0	
Labour hold		Swing		

=== Clifford ward ===
Clifford
Party	Candidate	Votes	%	±%
Labour	Sophie Taylor*	2,288	79.0	▲2.8
Green	Jess Mayo	353	12.2	▼1.3
Conservative	Limna Lijo	155	5.4	▼1.9
Liberal Democrats	John Reyes	85	2.9	Steady
Majority		1,935	66.8	
Registered electors		9,144		
Turnout		2,897	31.7	
Labour hold		Swing		

=== Davyhulme East ward ===
Davyhulme East
Party	Candidate	Votes	%	±%
Labour	Shirley Procter	1,732	54.1	▲2.2
Conservative	Steve Dillon	1,134	35.4	▼5.0
Green	Steve Tennant	180	5.6	▲0.9
Liberal Democrats	Timothy Kinsella	138	4.3	▲1.1
Majority		598	18.7	
Registered electors		7,603		
Turnout		3,199	42.1	
Labour hold		Swing		

=== Davyhulme West ward ===
Davyhulme West
Party	Candidate	Votes	%	±%
Labour	Graham Whitham*	1,780	55.5	▲2.1
Conservative	Tracey Haworth	1,094	34.1	▼5.9
Green	Kevin Chatterton	185	5.8	▲1.6
Liberal Democrats	Gerald Zuk	137	4.3	▲2.0
Majority		686	21.4	
Registered electors		7,668		
Turnout		3,209	41.8	
Labour hold		Swing		

=== Flixton ward ===
Flixton
Party	Candidate	Votes	%	±%
Labour	Simon Thomas*	2,152	59.4	▲5.4
Conservative	Jonathan Coupe	1,051	29.0	▼2.7
Green	Katrin Cotter	285	7.9	▼1.9
Liberal Democrats	Mark Campion	117	3.2	▼1.2
Majority		1,101	30.0	
Registered electors		8,266		
Turnout		3,622	43.8	
Labour hold		Swing		

=== Gorse Hill ward ===
Gorse Hill (2 seats)
Party	Candidate	Votes	%	±%
Labour	David Acton*	1,871	67.6	▼3.3
Labour	Fianna Hornby	1,611	58.2	▼12.7
Conservative	Stuart Donnelly	454	16.4	▼0.8
Conservative	Lijo John	353	12.8	▼4.4
Green	Laura Clitheroe	286	10.3	▲3.2
Independent	Hazel Gibb	188	6.8	N/A
Green	Sanjai Patel	182	6.6	▼0.5
Liberal Democrats	Chris Butler	141	5.1	▲0.4
Liberal Democrats	Dawn Carberry-Power	124	4.5	▼0.2
Majority				
Registered electors		8,733		
Turnout		2,768	31.7	
Labour hold		Swing		
Labour hold		Swing		

=== Hale Barns ward ===
Hale Barns
Party	Candidate	Votes	%	±%
Conservative	Dylan Butt*	1,676	58.9	▼2.9
Labour	Barbara Twiney	657	23.1	▲2.4
Liberal Democrats	Simon Lepori	254	8.9	▲1.8
Green	David Schorah	247	8.7	▼1.6
Majority		1,019	35.8	
Registered electors		7,421		
Turnout		2,846	38.4	
Conservative hold		Swing		

=== Hale Central ward ===
Hale Central
Party	Candidate	Votes	%	±%
Green	Jane Leicester	1,776	49.8	▲17.0
Conservative	John Brodie	1,255	35.2	▼2.5
Labour	Charles Mayer	324	9.1	▼1.3
Liberal Democrats	Marc Ramsbottom	200	5.6	▼14.9
Majority		521	14.6	▲9.8
Registered electors		7,429		
Turnout		3,565	48.0	▼5.8
Green gain from Conservative		Swing	▼9.8	

=== Longford ward ===
Longford
Party	Candidate	Votes	%	±%
Labour	David Jarman*	2,338	67.4	▲4.0
Conservative	Daniel May	451	13.0	▲2.5
Green	Margaret Westbrook	444	12.8	▲1.6
Liberal Democrats	Anna Fryer	224	6.5	▼3.4
Majority		1,887	54.4	
Registered electors		9,466		
Turnout		3,470	36.7	
Labour hold		Swing		

=== Priory ward ===
Priory
Party	Candidate	Votes	%	±%
Labour	Louise Dagnall*	2,076	59.7	▲9.5
Conservative	Rupali Paul	824	23.7	▲2.7
Green	Dave Turner	338	9.7	▲0.4
Liberal Democrats	Briony Stephenson	222	6.4	▲2.0
Majority		1,252	36.0	
Registered electors		8,123		
Turnout		3,479	42.8	
Labour hold		Swing		

=== Sale Moor ward ===
Sale Moor
Party	Candidate	Votes	%	±%
Labour	Liz Patel*	1,577	56.0	▼0.7
Conservative	Christopher Halliday	830	29.5	▼0.9
Green	Chris Hargreaves	264	9.4	▲1.0
Liberal Democrats	Mario Miniaci	136	4.8	▲0.8
Majority		747	26.5	
Registered electors		7,606		
Turnout		2,818	37.0	
Labour hold		Swing		

=== St. Mary's ward ===
St Mary's
Party	Candidate	Votes	%	±%
Conservative	Rob Duncan	1,513	47.6	▲0.1
Labour	Eve Parker	1,152	36.3	▲0.1
Green	James McGlashan	188	5.9	▼0.6
Liberal Democrats	Louise Bird	183	5.8	▲1.1
Women's Equality	Lucy Wood	127	4.0	▼1.9
Majority		361	11.4	
Registered electors		8,607		
Turnout		3,177	36.9	
Conservative hold		Swing		

=== Stretford ward ===
Stretford
Party	Candidate	Votes	%	±%
Labour	Jane Slater*	2,013	70.9	▲4.2
Conservative	Susan Taylor	431	15.2	▼4.1
Green	Liz O’Neill	281	9.9	▼1.0
Liberal Democrats	Stephen Power	104	3.7	▲1.5
Majority		1,582	55.7	
Registered electors		7,882		
Turnout		2,841	36.0	
Labour hold		Swing		

=== Timperley ward ===
Timperley
Party	Candidate	Votes	%	±%
Liberal Democrats	Will Frass	2,182	51.4	▲11.5
Conservative	Nathan Evans*	1,413	33.3	▼1.3
Labour	Ulrich Savary	438	10.3	▼7.8
Green	Dan Kyle	205	4.8	▲1.9
Majority		769	18.1	▲12.8
Registered electors		8,285		
Turnout		4,249	51.3	▼1.6
Liberal Democrats gain from Conservative		Swing	▲6.4	

=== Urmston ward ===
Urmston
Party	Candidate	Votes	%	±%
Labour	Kevin Procter*	2,043	59.4	▲1.3
Conservative	Veja Gorania	894	26.0	▼2.2
Green	Luciya Whyte	291	8.5	Steady
Liberal Democrats	John Franklin-Johnston	192	5.6	▲1.9
Majority		1,149	33.4	
Registered electors		8,439		
Turnout		3,440	40.8	
Labour hold		Swing		

=== Village ward ===
Village
Party	Candidate	Votes	%	±%
Liberal Democrats	Shaun Ennis	1,764	52.7	▲22.5
Conservative	Thomas Maxwell	939	28.1	▼9.8
Labour	Adam Legg	512	15.3	▼11.2
Green	Jennie Wadsworth	122	3.6	▼1.3
Majority		825	24.7	▲16.9
Registered electors		7,914		
Turnout		3,346	42.3	▼0.4
Liberal Democrats gain from Conservative		Swing	▲16.2	
