= 2006 Trafford Metropolitan Borough Council election =

2006 UK local government election

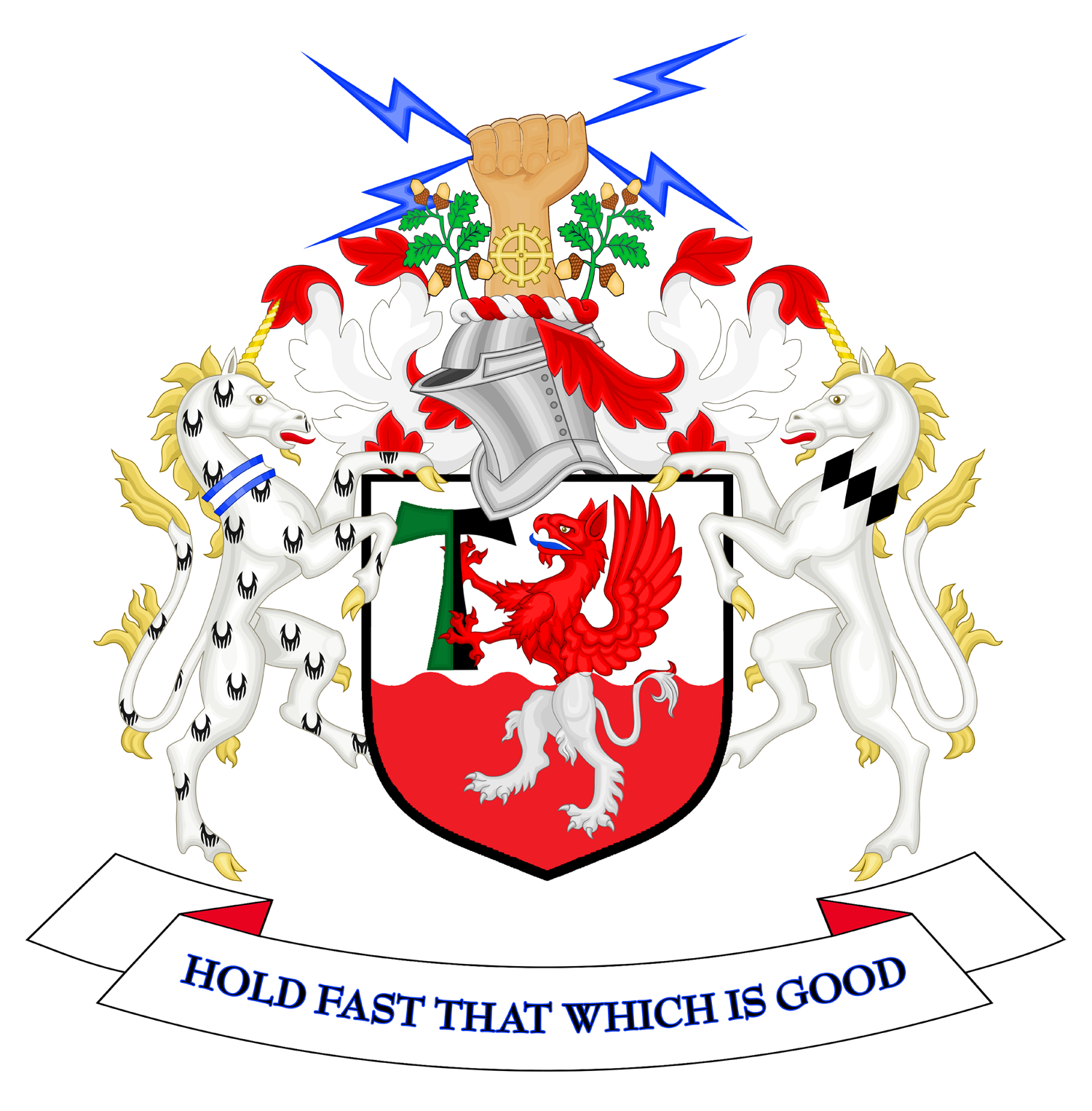
- 4 May 2006

21 of 63 seats to Trafford Metropolitan Borough Council 32 seats needed for a majority
	First party	Second party	Third party
Leader	Susan Williams	David Acton	Ray Bowker
Party	Conservative	Labour	Liberal Democrats
Leader's seat	Altrincham	Gorse Hill	Village
Last election	40 seats, 53.0%	20 seats, 29.0%	3 seats, 15.5%
Seats before	40	20	3
Seats won	13	6	2
Seats after	39	20	4
Seat change	▼1	Steady	▲1
Popular vote	27,936	17,475	7,359
Percentage	48.0%	30.0%	12.6%
Swing	▼5.0%	▲1.0%	▼2.9%
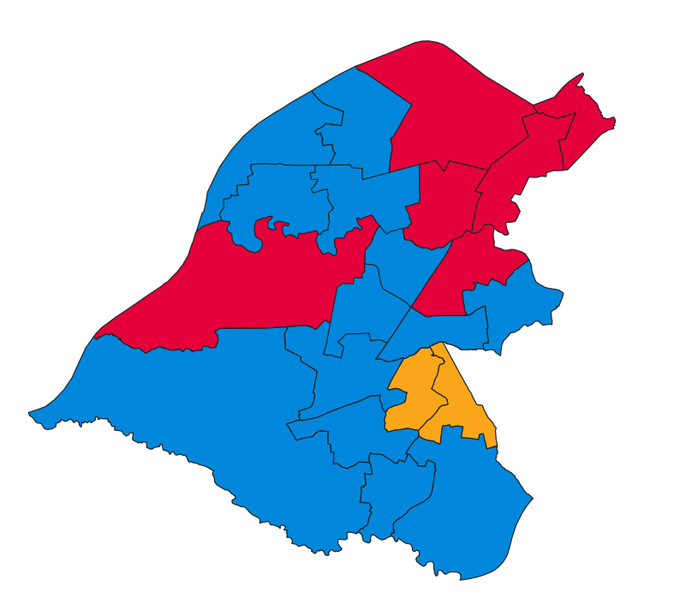
- Map of results of 2006 election
Leader of the Council before election
Susan Williams
Conservative
Leader of the Council after election
Susan Williams
Conservative

Elections to Trafford Council were held on 4 May 2006. One third of the council was up for election, with each successful candidate to serve a four-year term of office, expiring in 2010. The Conservative Party retained overall control of the council.

== Election result ==
Party	Votes		Seats			Full Council	
Conservative Party	27,936 (48.0%)	▼5.0	13 (61.9%)	13 / 21	▼1	39 (61.9%)	39 / 63
Labour Party	17,475 (30.0%)	▲1.0	6 (28.6%)	6 / 21	Steady	20 (31.7%)	20 / 63
Liberal Democrats	7,359 (12.6%)	▼2.9	2 (9.5%)	2 / 21	▲1	4 (6.3%)	4 / 63
Green Party	5,151 (8.9%)	▲6.9	0 (0.0%)	0 / 21	Steady	0 (0.0%)	0 / 63
Independent	156 (0.3%)	N/A	0 (0.0%)	0 / 21	N/A	0 (0.0%)	0 / 63
UKIP	148 (0.3%)	N/A	0 (0.0%)	0 / 21	N/A	0 (0.0%)	0 / 63

↓
20	4	39

== Ward results ==
=== Altrincham ===
Altrincham
Party	Candidate	Votes	%	±%
Conservative	Michael Young	1,430	53.6	−17.6
Labour	Peter Baugh	611	22.9	+7.2
Liberal Democrats	Roger Legge	404	15.1	+2.0
Green	Jadwiga Leigh	225	8.4	+8.4
Majority		819	30.7	+2.8
Turnout		2,670	35.7	−11.5
Conservative hold		Swing		

=== Ashton upon Mersey ===
Ashton upon Mersey
Party	Candidate	Votes	%	±%
Conservative	John Lamb*	1,645	58.4	+3.3
Labour	Sophie Taylor	728	25.9	−4.0
Green	Daniel Leach	442	15.7	+9.3
Majority		917	32.5	+14.0
Turnout		2,815	39.4	−10.5
Conservative hold		Swing		

=== Bowdon ===
Bowdon
Party	Candidate	Votes	%	±%
Conservative	Paula Pearson*	2,085	69.8	−8.2
Liberal Democrats	Ian Chappell	385	12.9	+3.2
Labour	Thomas Hague	300	10.1	+3.7
Green	Bridget Green	216	7.2	+1.3
Majority		1,700	56.9	+9.9
Turnout		2,986	41.7	−12.0
Conservative hold		Swing		

=== Broadheath ===
Broadheath
Party	Candidate	Votes	%	±%
Conservative	James Pearson*	1,392	49.6	−8.8
Labour	Ian Golding	725	25.8	−9.0
Liberal Democrats	Pauline Cliff	428	15.2	+8.5
Green	Martin Bate	263	9.4	+9.4
Majority		667	23.8	−7.9
Turnout		2,808	35.8	−9.5
Conservative hold		Swing		

=== Brooklands ===
Brooklands
Party	Candidate	Votes	%	±%
Conservative	Pamela Dixon*	1,808	59.5	−20.7
Liberal Democrats	Kenneth Clarke	722	23.8	+7.3
Labour	Angela Gratrix	509	16.8	+16.8
Majority		1,086	35.7	+10.3
Turnout		3,039	38.9	−10.5
Conservative hold		Swing		

=== Bucklow-St. Martin's ===
Bucklow-St. Martins
Party	Candidate	Votes	%	±%
Labour	David Quayle*	967	53.5	−13.1
Conservative	Anne Cavanagh	560	31.0	−2.4
Green	William Gradwell	280	15.5	+15.5
Majority		407	22.5	−7.4
Turnout		1,807	28.0	−6.7
Labour hold		Swing		

=== Clifford ===
Clifford
Party	Candidate	Votes	%	±%
Labour	Andrea Jones*	1,375	64.0	+17.7
Green	Anne Power	413	19.2	+7.5
Conservative	Edward Kelson	359	16.7	+5.7
Majority		962	44.8	+32.9
Turnout		2,147	31.9	−9.8
Labour hold		Swing		

=== Davyhulme East ===
Davyhulme East
Party	Candidate	Votes	%	±%
Conservative	Michael Cornes*	1,726	63.1	−2.5
Labour	Nigel Roberts	1,008	36.9	+9.7
Majority		718	26.2	−6.2
Turnout		2,734	36.5	−9.1
Conservative hold		Swing		

=== Davyhulme West ===
Davyhulme West
Party	Candidate	Votes	%	±%
Conservative	June Reilly*	1,735	61.4	−1.0
Labour	Kevin Procter	801	28.3	−3.2
Green	Margaret Westbrook	292	10.3	+10.3
Majority		934	33.1	+4.3
Turnout		2,828	38.7	−9.8
Conservative hold		Swing		

=== Flixton ===
Flixton
Party	Candidate	Votes	%	±%
Conservative	Elsie Ward*	1,644	53.4	−3.7
Labour	Joyce Acton	1,030	33.4	−1.4
Green	Christopher Webb	406	13.2	+13.2
Majority		614	20.0	+0.4
Turnout		3,080	38.4	−10.2
Conservative hold		Swing		

=== Gorse Hill ===
Gorse Hill
Party	Candidate	Votes	%	±%
Labour	David Acton*	1,112	55.5	−3.4
Conservative	George Manley	496	24.8	−7.1
Green	Philip Leape	238	11.9	+11.9
Independent	Colin Hendrie	156	7.8	+7.8
Majority		616	30.7	+8.6
Turnout		2,002	27.3	−5.5
Labour hold		Swing		

=== Hale Barns ===
Hale Barns
Party	Candidate	Votes	%	±%
Conservative	Dilriaz Butt*	2,061	71.1	−9.8
Liberal Democrats	Richard Elliott	538	18.6	−0.5
Labour	Moira Lythgoe	301	10.4	+10.4
Majority		1,523	52.5	+39.7
Turnout		2,900	39.2	−14.6
Conservative hold		Swing		

=== Hale Central ===
Hale Central
Party	Candidate	Votes	%	±%
Conservative	Alan Mitchell*	1,641	61.0	−14.5
Liberal Democrats	Michael Mills	418	15.5	+2.3
Labour	Beverly Harrison	335	12.5	+1.3
Green	Samuel Little	295	11.0	+11.0
Majority		1,223	45.5	+12.3
Turnout		2,689	38.6	−13.0
Conservative hold		Swing		

=== Longford ===
Longford
Party	Candidate	Votes	%	±%
Labour	David Jarman*	1,299	48.0	+6.2
Conservative	Roderick Allan	870	32.2	+3.9
Green	Matthew Westbrook	388	14.3	+3.8
UKIP	Michael McManus	148	5.5	+5.5
Majority		429	15.8	+3.2
Turnout		2,705	33.6	−6.5
Labour hold		Swing		

=== Priory ===
Priory
Party	Candidate	Votes	%	±%
Labour	Jane Baugh*	1,121	39.2	−1.2
Conservative	Marion Rigby	950	33.2	+1.5
Liberal Democrats	Margaret Clarke	510	17.8	−7.9
Green	Joseph Westbrook	281	9.8	+9.8
Majority		171	6.0	+2.6
Turnout		2,862	39.3	−12.1
Labour hold		Swing		

=== Sale Moor ===
Sale Moor
Party	Candidate	Votes	%	±%
Conservative	Christine Bailey*	1,076	40.0	+1.5
Labour	Stephen Smith	1,051	39.1	−0.3
Liberal Democrats	James Eisen	562	20.9	−1.8
Majority		25	0.9	−1.0
Turnout		2,689	36.6	−7.8
Conservative hold		Swing		

=== St. Mary's ===
St. Mary's
Party	Candidate	Votes	%	±%
Conservative	John Tolhurst*	1,555	52.2	−4.9
Labour	Tom Ross	833	28.0	−5.3
Liberal Democrats	Diane Hibberd	392	13.2	+6.7
Green	Janet Jackson	199	6.7	+6.7
Majority		722	24.2	+8.4
Turnout		2,979	36.8	−10.4
Conservative hold		Swing		

=== Stretford ===
Stretford
Party	Candidate	Votes	%	±%
Labour	Karina Carter*	1,355	49.7	−2.2
Conservative	Colin Hooley	926	34.0	−7.5
Green	Jennie Gander	445	16.3	+16.3
Majority		429	15.7	+12.6
Turnout		2,726	37.0	−0.1
Labour hold		Swing		

=== Timperley ===
Timperley
Party	Candidate	Votes	%	±%
Liberal Democrats	Neil Taylor	1,610	43.6	+10.0
Conservative	Mohibul Choudhury	1,508	40.9	−17.4
Labour	Penelope Fraser	389	10.5	+2.3
Green	Martin Green	184	5.0	+5.0
Majority		102	2.7	−16.9
Turnout		3,691	44.8	−7.6
Liberal Democrats gain from Conservative		Swing		

=== Urmston ===
Urmston
Party	Candidate	Votes	%	±%
Conservative	James Wibberley*	1,507	46.4	−3.6
Labour	William Clarke	1,299	40.0	−2.9
Green	Helen Jocys	442	13.6	+6.6
Majority		208	6.4	+3.2
Turnout		3,248	42.4	−8.5
Conservative hold		Swing		

=== Village ===
Village
Party	Candidate	Votes	%	±%
Liberal Democrats	Douglas Fishwick*	1,390	49.3	−9.0
Conservative	Peter Cameron	962	34.1	−0.9
Labour	Stephanie Crean	326	11.6	+4.8
Green	Erica Wright	142	5.0	+5.0
Majority		428	15.2	−0.8
Turnout		2,820	38.2	−8.9
Liberal Democrats hold		Swing		
