= St Mary's (Trafford ward) =

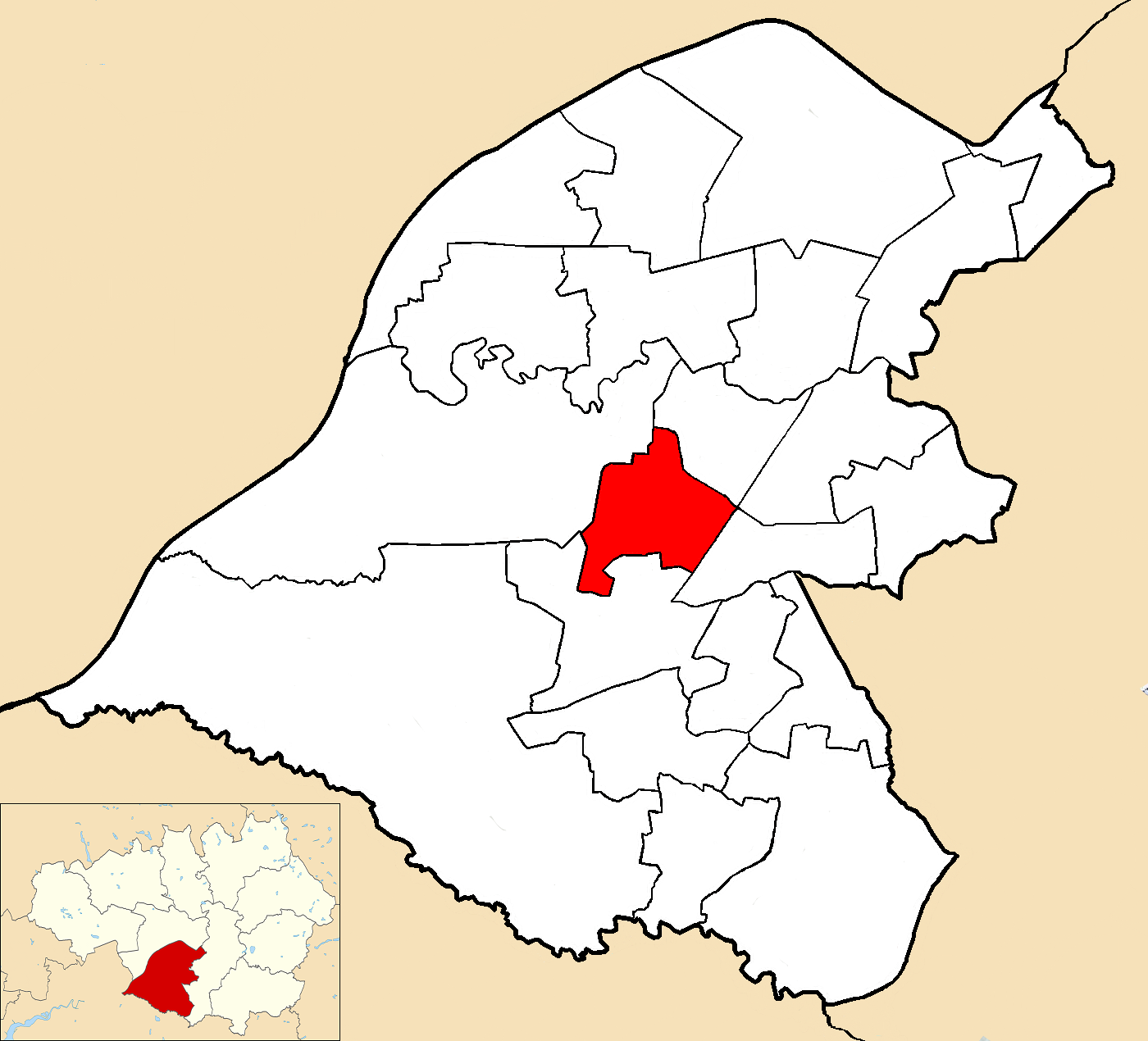
- St Mary's within Trafford
- Population: 11,795
- Metropolitan borough: Trafford
- Metropolitan county: Greater Manchester
- Country: England
- Sovereign state: United Kingdom
- UK Parliament: Altrincham and Sale West
- Councillors: Rob Duncan (Conservative); Dan Bunting (Conservative); John Holden (Conservative)

St Mary's is an electoral ward of Trafford covering most of the southern half of Ashton upon Mersey in Sale.

The ward was created in 2004 largely from the old St Martins ward and parts of the old Mersey St Mary's ward.

== Councillors ==
As of 2022, the councillors are Rob Duncan (Conservative), Dan Bunting (Conservative), and John Holden (Conservative).

Election	Councillor	Councillor	Councillor
2004	John Tolhurst (Con)	Dan Bunting (Con)	John Holden (Con)
2006	John Tolhurst (Con)	Dan Bunting (Con)	John Holden (Con)
2007	John Tolhurst (Con)	Dan Bunting (Con)	John Holden (Con)
2008	John Tolhurst (Con)	Dan Bunting (Con)	John Holden (Con)
2010	Rob Chilton (Con)	Dan Bunting (Con)	John Holden (Con)
2011	Rob Chilton (Con)	Dan Bunting (Con)	John Holden (Con)
2012	Rob Chilton (Con)	Dan Bunting (Con)	John Holden (Con)
2014	Rob Chilton (Con)	Dan Bunting (Con)	John Holden (Con)
2015	Rob Chilton (Con)	Dan Bunting (Con)	John Holden (Con)
2016	Rob Chilton (Con)	Dan Bunting (Con)	John Holden (Con)
2018	Rob Chilton (Con)	Dan Bunting (Con)	John Holden (Con)
2019	Rob Chilton (Con)	Dan Bunting (Con)	John Holden (Con)
2021	Rob Chilton (Con)	Dan Bunting (Con)	John Holden (Con)
2022	Rob Duncan (Con)	Dan Bunting (Con)	John Holden (Con)

indicates seat up for re-election.

== Elections in the 2020s ==
=== May 2022 ===
2022
Party	Candidate	Votes	%	±%
Conservative	Rob Duncan	1,513	47.6	
Labour	Eve Parker	1,152	36.3	
Green	James McGlashan	188	5.9	
Liberal Democrats	Louise Bird	183	5.8	
Women's Equality	Lucy Wood	127	4.0	
Majority		361	11.4	
Registered electors		8,607		
Turnout		3,177	36.9	
Conservative hold		Swing		

=== May 2021 ===
2021
Party	Candidate	Votes	%	±%
Conservative	John Holden*	1,729	47.5	▼9.9
Labour	James Mills	1,317	36.2	▲4.9
Green	James McGlashan	235	6.5	▲0.4
Liberal Democrats	Louise Bird	174	4.8	0.0
Women's Equality	Lucy Wood	134	3.7	N/A
Majority		412	11.3	▼14.9
Rejected ballots		23		
Registered electors		8,671		
Turnout		3,638	42.0	▲4.4
Conservative hold		Swing	▼7.4	

== Elections in the 2010s ==
=== May 2019 ===
2019
Party	Candidate	Votes	%	±%
Conservative	Dan Bunting*	1,527	49.1	−10.9
Labour	Jill Axford	920	29.6	−1.2
Green	James McGlashan	294	9.4	+5.0
Liberal Democrats	Alison Smith	188	6.0	+1.2
UKIP	Kathy Mason	184	5.9	+5.9
Majority		607	19.5	−6.8
Turnout		3,113	36.3	−3.6
Conservative hold		Swing		

=== May 2018 ===
2018
Party	Candidate	Votes	%	±%
Conservative	Rob Chilton*	2,053	60.0	+2.3
Labour	Mal Choudhury	1,054	30.8	−0.5
Liberal Democrats	Louise Bird	167	4.9	+0.1
Green	Nicholas Robertson-Brown	149	4.4	−1.7
Majority		999	29.2	+2.9
Turnout		3,423	39.9	+2.3
Conservative hold		Swing		

=== May 2016 ===
2016
Party	Candidate	Votes	%	±%
Conservative	John Holden*	1,772	57.4	+4.3
Labour	Gary Keary	965	31.3	−3.2
Green	Nicholas Robertson-Brown	187	6.1	−0.9
Liberal Democrats	Louise Bird	147	4.8	−0.4
Majority		807	26.2	+7.4
Turnout		3,085	37.6	−28.3
Conservative hold		Swing		

=== May 2015 ===
2015
Party	Candidate	Votes	%	±%
Conservative	Dan Bunting*	2,911	53.4	+6.7
Labour	Michael Melia	1,880	34.5	−0.3
Green	Jane Leicester	381	7.0	+3.1
Liberal Democrats	David Martin	283	5.2	+2.2
Majority		1,031	18.9	+7.0
Turnout		5,455	65.9	+25.9
Conservative hold		Swing		

=== May 2014 ===
2014
Party	Candidate	Votes	%	±%
Conservative	Rob Chilton*	1,617	46.7	+3.4
Labour	James Wright	1,206	34.8	−7.6
UKIP	John Walsh	401	11.6	+7.5
Green	Phil Kilburn	134	3.9	+0.8
Liberal Democrats	Pauline Cliff	105	3.0	−16.9
Majority		411	11.9	−1.8
Turnout		3,463	40.3	
Conservative hold		Swing		

=== May 2012 ===
2012
Party	Candidate	Votes	%	±%
Conservative	John Holden*	1,285	43.0	−7.4
Labour	Simon Buckley	1,266	42.4	+7.0
UKIP	Stephen Farndon	203	6.8	+1.1
Liberal Democrats	Jordan Cooper	122	4.1	−1.3
Green	Joseph Ryan	111	3.7	+0.6
Majority		19	0.6	−14.4
Turnout		2,987	35.2	−4.8
Conservative hold		Swing		

=== May 2011 ===
2011
Party	Candidate	Votes	%	±%
Conservative	Daniel Bunting*	1,773	50.4	+7.1
Labour	Matthew Finnegan	1,246	35.4	+5.8
UKIP	Stephen Farndon	201	5.7	+1.6
Liberal Democrats	Jordan Cooper	190	5.4	−14.5
Green	Iram Zaman	108	3.1	+0.1
Majority		527	15.0	+1.3
Turnout		3,518	40.0	−22.8
Conservative hold		Swing		

=== May 2010 ===
2010
Party	Candidate	Votes	%	±%
Conservative	Rob Chilton	2,367	43.3	−12.7
Labour	Thomas Tomkins	1,619	29.6	+7.5
Liberal Democrats	Marjorie Rhodes	1,089	19.9	+10.4
UKIP	Stephen Farndon	223	4.1	−3.4
Green	Zoe Power	165	3.0	−1.9
Majority		748	13.7	−20.2
Turnout		5,463	62.8	+28.5
Conservative hold		Swing		

== Elections in the 2000s ==
=== May 2008 ===
2008
Party	Candidate	Votes	%	±%
Conservative	John Holden*	1,659	56.0	+1.1
Labour	Tom Tomkins	655	22.1	−4.1
Liberal Democrats	Diane Webster	280	9.5	−1.6
UKIP	Stephen Farndon	223	7.5	+4.2
Green	Zoe Power	145	4.9	+0.4
Majority		1,004	33.9	+5.2
Turnout		2,962	34.3	−1.9
Conservative hold		Swing		

=== May 2007 ===
2007
Party	Candidate	Votes	%	±%
Conservative	Dan Bunting*	1,642	54.9	+2.7
Labour	Tom Ross	783	26.2	−1.8
Liberal Democrats	Diane Webster	332	11.1	−2.1
Green	Simon Campling	134	4.5	−2.2
UKIP	Stephen Farndon	100	3.3	+3.3
Majority		859	28.7	+4.5
Turnout		2,991	36.2	−0.6
Conservative hold		Swing		

=== May 2006 ===
2006
Party	Candidate	Votes	%	±%
Conservative	John Tolhurst*	1,555	52.2	−4.9
Labour	Tom Ross	833	28.0	−5.3
Liberal Democrats	Diane Hibberd	392	13.2	+6.7
Green	Janet Jackson	199	6.7	+6.7
Majority		722	24.2	+8.4
Turnout		2,979	36.8	−10.4
Conservative hold		Swing		

=== June 2004 ===
2004 (after boundary changes)
Party	Candidate	Votes	%	±%
Conservative	John Holden	1,926	19.7	
Conservative	Daniel Bunting	1,912	19.5	
Conservative	John Tolhurst*	1,754	17.9	
Labour	Leonard Murkin*	1,237	12.6	
Labour	Sophie Taylor	1,073	10.9	
Labour	Angela Gray*	963	9.8	
Liberal Democrats	Diane Hibberd	641	6.5	
BNP	Dorothy Gough	294	3.0	
Turnout		9,800	47.2	
Conservative gain from Labour		Swing		
Conservative gain from Labour		Swing		
Conservative gain from Labour		Swing		
