= 2008 Trafford Metropolitan Borough Council election =

2008 UK local government election

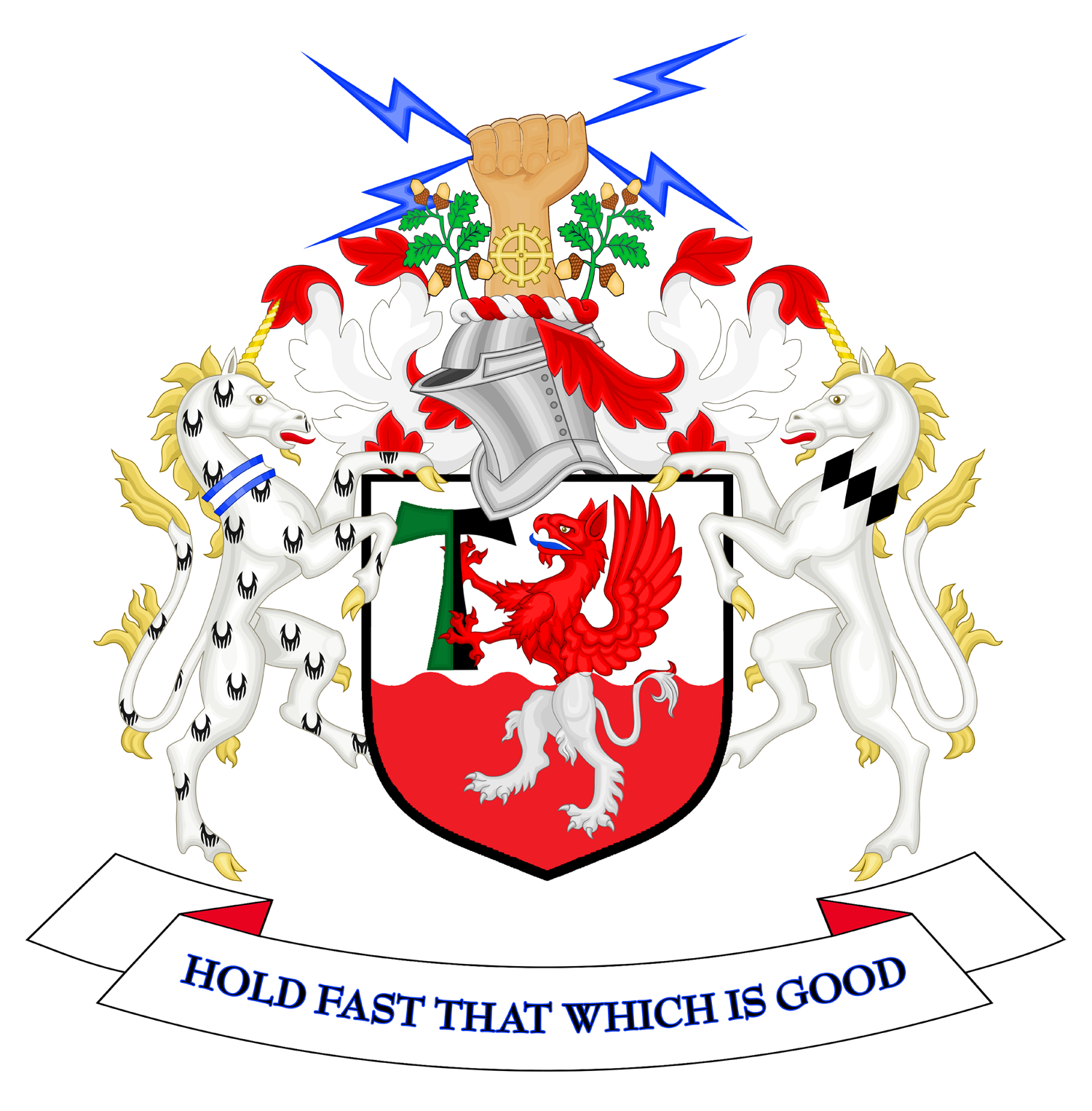
- 1 May 2008

22 of 63 seats to Trafford Metropolitan Borough Council 32 seats needed for a majority
	First party	Second party	Third party
Leader	Susan Williams	David Acton	Ray Bowker
Party	Conservative	Labour	Liberal Democrats
Leader's seat	Altrincham	Gorse Hill	Village
Last election	13 seats, 46.3%	8 seats, 29.6%	1 seats, 12.6%
Seats before	38	20	4
Seats won	13	7	2
Seats after	39	19	5
Seat change	▲1	▼1	▲1
Popular vote	30,145	17,584	10,779
Percentage	47.3%	27.6%	16.9%
Swing	▲1.0%	▼2.0%	▲2.3%
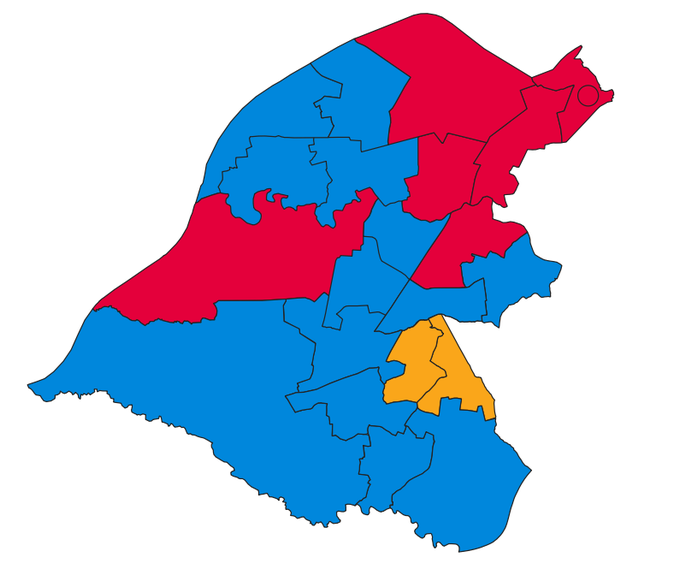
- Map of results of 2008 election
Leader of the Council before election
Susan Williams
Conservative
Leader of the Council after election
Susan Williams
Conservative

Elections to Trafford Council were held on 1 May 2008. One-third of the council was up for election, with each successful candidate to serve a four-year term of office, expiring in 2012. The Conservative Party held overall control of the council.

== Election result ==
Party	Votes		Seats			Full Council	
Conservative Party	30,145 (47.3%)	▲1.0	13 (59.1%)	13 / 22	▲1	39 (61.9%)	39 / 63
Labour Party	17,584 (27.6%)	▼2.0	7 (31.8%)	7 / 22	▼1	19 (30.2%)	19 / 63
Liberal Democrats	10,779 (16.9%)	▲2.3	2 (9.1%)	2 / 22	▲1	5 (7.9%)	5 / 63
Green Party	4,682 (7.4%)	▼0.9	0 (0.0%)	0 / 22	Steady	0 (0.0%)	0 / 63
UKIP	223 (0.4%)	▲0.2	0 (0.0%)	0 / 22	Steady	0 (0.0%)	0 / 63
BNP	297 (0.2%)	▼0.3	0 (0.0%)	0 / 22	Steady	0 (0.0%)	0 / 63
Independent	137 (0.2%)	N/A	0 (0.0%)	0 / 22	▼1	0 (0.0%)	0 / 63

↓
19	5	39

== Ward results ==
=== Altrincham ward ===
Altrincham
Party	Candidate	Votes	%	±%
Conservative	Susan Williams*	1,590	56.3	+0.3
Labour	Majella Kennedy	620	22.0	−0.5
Liberal Democrats	Roger Legge	323	11.4	−2.9
Green	Deborah Leftwich	155	5.5	−1.7
Independent	Sarah Walmsley	137	4.9	+4.9
Majority		970	34.3	+0.9
Turnout		2,825	35.2	−2.9
Conservative hold		Swing		

=== Ashton upon Mersey ward ===
Ashton upon Mersey
Party	Candidate	Votes	%	±%
Conservative	Brian Rigby*	1,762	60.1	+4.8
Labour	Michael Wilton	535	18.3	−2.9
Liberal Democrats	Terry Corbett	389	13.3	+0.7
Green	Marian Sudbury	244	8.3	−2.6
Majority		1,227	41.9	+7.8
Turnout		2,930	40.4	−1.7
Conservative hold		Swing		

=== Bowdon ward ===
Bowdon
Party	Candidate	Votes	%	±%
Conservative	Sean Anstee	2,187	73.4	+2.4
Liberal Democrats	Ian Chappell	334	11.3	−0.4
Labour	Thomas Hague	255	8.6	−1.3
Green	Bridget Green	190	6.4	−1.0
Majority		1,853	62.5	+3.2
Turnout		2,966	39.9	−1.6
Conservative hold		Swing		

=== Broadheath ward ===
Broadheath
Party	Candidate	Votes	%	±%
Conservative	Brenda Houraghan*	1,681	54.1	+2.9
Labour	Andrew Western	836	26.9	−1.0
Liberal Democrats	Armaan Chohan	334	10.8	−2.5
Green	Martin Bate	255	8.2	−0.6
Majority		845	27.2	+3.9
Turnout		3,106	35.5	−0.9
Conservative hold		Swing		

=== Brooklands ward ===
Brooklands
Party	Candidate	Votes	%	±%
Conservative	Kathy Bullock*	1,883	60.5	+4.3
Labour	Angela Gratrix	522	17.8	+0.8
Liberal Democrats	Kenneth Clarke	514	16.5	−3.0
Green	Barbara Jarkowski	196	6.3	−1.0
Majority		1,361	43.7	+7.0
Turnout		3,115	38.9	+2.2
Conservative hold		Swing		

=== Bucklow-St. Martins ward ===
Bucklow-St. Martins
Party	Candidate	Votes	%	±%
Labour	Ian Platt*	961	50.1	−2.5
Conservative	Anne Hooley	592	30.9	+6.3
Liberal Democrats	Elizabeth Hogg	183	9.5	+9.5
Green	Melanie Bell	182	9.5	+0.9
Majority		369	19.2	−8.8
Turnout		1,918	26.7	−4.7
Labour hold		Swing		

=== Clifford ward ===
Clifford (2 vacancies)
Party	Candidate	Votes	%	±%
Labour	Eunice Whitfield Stennett*	1,434	32.0	+4.8
Labour	Sophie Taylor	1,212	27.1	−5.0
Green	Christine Rawson	377	8.4	+1.5
Conservative	John Schofield	338	7.6	+2.5
Conservative	John Blackburn	318	7.1	+1.5
Green	Anne Power	313	7.0	−1.3
Liberal Democrats	Louise Bird	264	5.9	−1.1
Liberal Democrats	Derek Hurst	220	4.9	−3.1
Majority		835	37.3	−6.6
Turnout		4,476	32.6	−0.8
Labour hold		Swing		
Labour hold		Swing		

=== Davyhulme East ward ===
Davyhulme East
Party	Candidate	Votes	%	±%
Conservative	Linda Blackburn	1,728	60.3	+1.9
Labour	Ged Carter	703	24.5	−6.9
Liberal Democrats	Graham Rogers	286	10.0	+10.0
Green	Jennie Gander	150	5.2	−1.8
Majority		1,025	35.8	+8.8
Turnout		2,867	36.2	−2.0
Conservative hold		Swing		

=== Davyhulme West ward ===
Davyhulme West
Party	Candidate	Votes	%	±%
Conservative	Brian Shaw	1,755	61.5	+0.9
Labour	Kevin Procter	669	23.5	−6.8
Liberal Democrats	Simon Wright	292	10.2	+10.2
Green	Joe Ryan	137	4.8	−4.3
Majority		1,086	38.1	+7.7
Turnout		2,853	37.0	−2.2
Conservative hold		Swing		

=== Flixton ward ===
Flixton
Party	Candidate	Votes	%	±%
Conservative	Keith Summerfield*	1,785	55.6	+4.9
Labour	Dolores O'Sullivan	890	27.7	−4.7
Liberal Democrats	Richard Elliott	321	10.0	−0.1
Green	Paul Syrett	213	6.6	−0.2
Majority		895	27.9	+9.5
Turnout		3,209	38.2	−2.0
Conservative hold		Swing		

=== Gorse Hill ward ===
Gorse Hill
Party	Candidate	Votes	%	±%
Labour	Laurence Walsh*	1,170	52.3	−5.6
Conservative	Colin Levenston	617	27.6	+4.4
Liberal Democrats	Francis Beswick	262	11.7	+4.5
Green	Philip Leape	189	8.5	−3.3
Majority		553	24.7	−6.2
Turnout		2,238	27.7	−1.1
Labour hold		Swing		

=== Hale Barns ward ===
Hale Barns
Party	Candidate	Votes	%	±%
Conservative	Patrick Myers	2,216	72.2	+2.4
Liberal Democrats	Sandra Taylor	437	14.2	−2.2
Labour	Emily Spurrell	290	9.5	+0.4
Green	Andrew Gratton	125	4.1	−0.6
Majority		1,779	60.0	+6.6
Turnout		3,068	40.3	−1.9
Conservative hold		Swing		

=== Hale Central ward ===
Hale Central
Party	Candidate	Votes	%	±%
Conservative	Chris Candish	1,861	66.3	+3.1
Labour	Beverly Harrison	379	13.5	−0.3
Liberal Democrats	Pauline Cliff	338	12.0	+1.6
Green	Sarah McIlroy	231	8.2	−4.5
Majority		1,482	52.8	+3.4
Turnout		2,809	38.1	−2.4
Conservative gain from Independent		Swing		

=== Longford ward ===
Longford
Party	Candidate	Votes	%	±%
Labour	Judith Lloyd*	1,167	41.3	−4.2
Conservative	Rod Allan	931	32.9	+2.8
Green	Margaret Westbrook	448	15.8	+2.4
Liberal Democrats	David Rhodes	282	10.0	−1.0
Majority		236	8.3	−7.1
Turnout		2,828	32.5	−2.6
Labour hold		Swing		

=== Priory ward ===
Priory
Party	Candidate	Votes	%	±%
Labour	Barry Brotherton*	1,225	40.9	−1.2
Conservative	Rob Chilton	1,013	33.9	+2.1
Liberal Democrats	James Eisen	358	12.0	−2.2
Green	Emma Handley	253	8.5	−3.5
BNP	Philip Davis	144	4.8	+4.8
Majority		212	7.1	−3.1
Turnout		2,993	38.7	−0.9
Labour hold		Swing		

=== Sale Moor ward ===
Sale Moor
Party	Candidate	Votes	%	±%
Conservative	Nigel Hooley	1,120	39.9	+4.9
Labour	Philip Gratrix*	1,116	39.8	−0.8
Liberal Democrats	Margaret Clarke	351	12.5	+1.9
Green	Bridget Battye	218	7.8	+2.6
Majority		4	0.1	−5.5
Turnout		2,805	36.6	−2.6
Conservative gain from Labour		Swing		

=== St. Mary's ward ===
St. Mary's
Party	Candidate	Votes	%	±%
Conservative	John Holden*	1,659	56.0	+1.1
Labour	Tom Tomkins	655	22.1	−4.1
Liberal Democrats	Diane Webster	280	9.5	−1.6
UKIP	Stephen Farndon	223	7.5	+4.2
Green	Zoe Power	145	4.9	+0.4
Majority		1,004	33.9	+5.2
Turnout		2,962	34.3	−1.9
Conservative hold		Swing		

=== Stretford ward ===
Stretford
Party	Candidate	Votes	%	±%
Labour	Tom Ross	1,345	49.7	−1.2
Conservative	Colin Hooley	896	33.1	+2.2
Green	Liz O'Neill	247	9.1	−0.5
Liberal Democrats	John O'Connor	218	8.1	−1.5
Majority		449	16.6	−3.4
Turnout		2,706	35.0	−1.9
Labour hold		Swing		

=== Timperley ward ===
Timperley
Party	Candidate	Votes	%	±%
Liberal Democrats	Jane Brophy	2,196	49.9	+2.4
Conservative	Darren Storey	1,864	42.3	−6.0
Labour	Peter Baugh	247	5.6	+5.6
Green	Jadwiga Leigh	97	2.2	−2.0
Majority		332	7.5	+6.7
Turnout		4,404	52.0	+2.7
Liberal Democrats gain from Conservative		Swing		

=== Urmston ward ===
Urmston
Party	Candidate	Votes	%	±%
Conservative	Christine Turner*	1,346	39.8	−3.8
Labour	Joyce Acton	1,129	33.4	−5.9
Liberal Democrats	Bernard Murray	714	21.1	+12.9
Green	Helen Jocys	191	5.7	−3.2
Majority		217	6.4	+2.1
Turnout		3,380	41.9	−0.8
Conservative hold		Swing		

=== Village ward ===
Village
Party	Candidate	Votes	%	±%
Liberal Democrats	Ray Bowker*	1,883	58.2	+8.5
Conservative	Jacki Wilkinson	1,003	31.0	−5.4
Labour	Thomas Shelton	224	6.9	−2.8
Green	Michael Leigh	126	3.9	−0.3
Majority		880	27.2	+14
Turnout		3,236	41.1	+1.0
Liberal Democrats hold		Swing		
