= 2004 Trafford Metropolitan Borough Council election =

2004 UK local government election

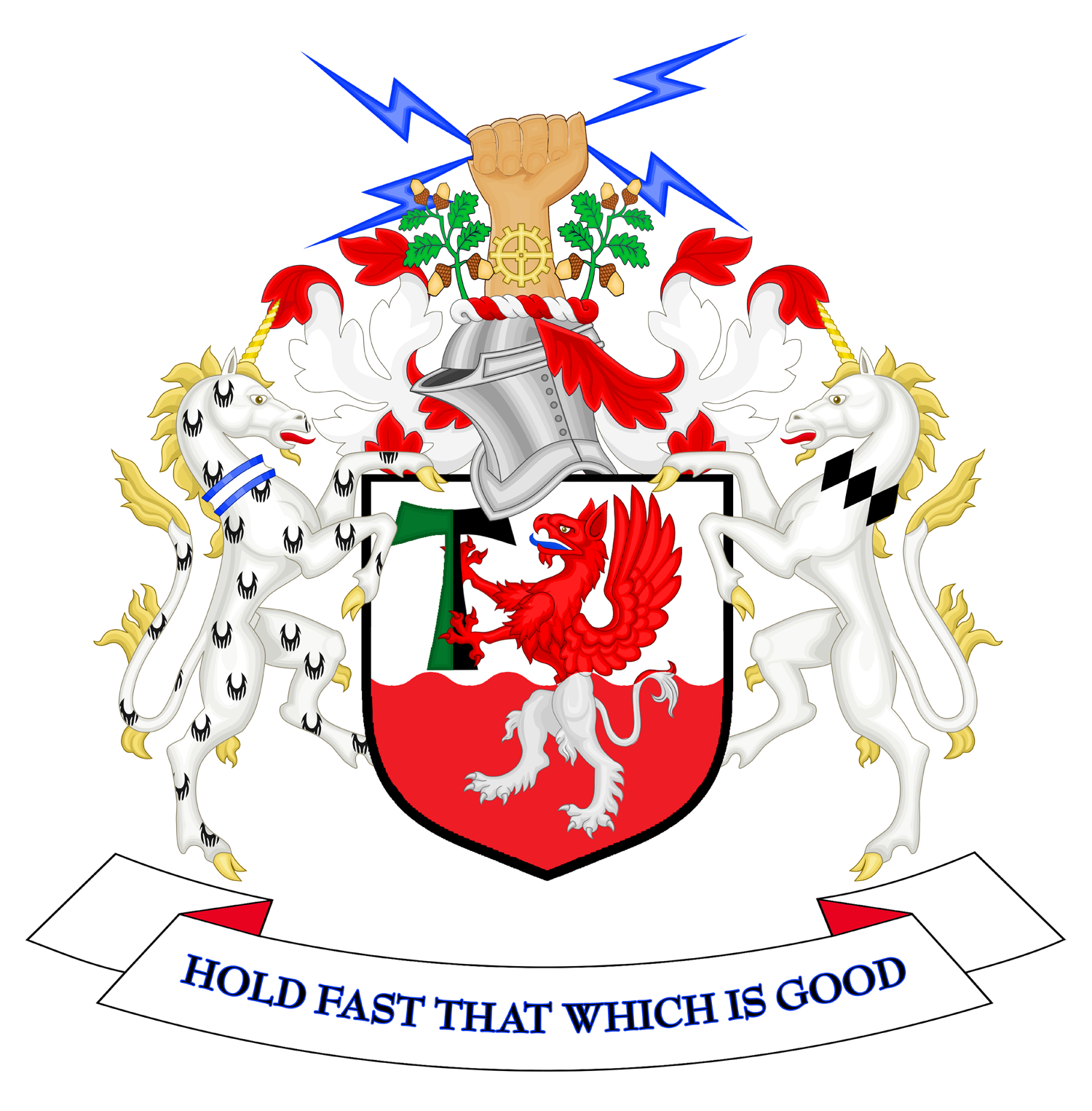
- 10 June 2004

63 of 63 seats to Trafford Metropolitan Borough Council 32 seats needed for a majority
	First party	Second party	Third party
Leader	Susan Fildes	David Acton	Ray Bowker
Party	Conservative	Labour	Liberal Democrats
Leader's seat	Altrincham	Gorse Hill	Village
Last election	10 seats, 45.9%	10 seats, 35.7%	1 seats, 13.5%
Seats before	28	31	4
Seats won	40	20	3
Seat change	▲12	▼11	▼1
Popular vote	96,079	52,509	28,011
Percentage	53.0%	29.0%	15.5%
Swing	▲7.1%	▼6.7%	▲2.0%
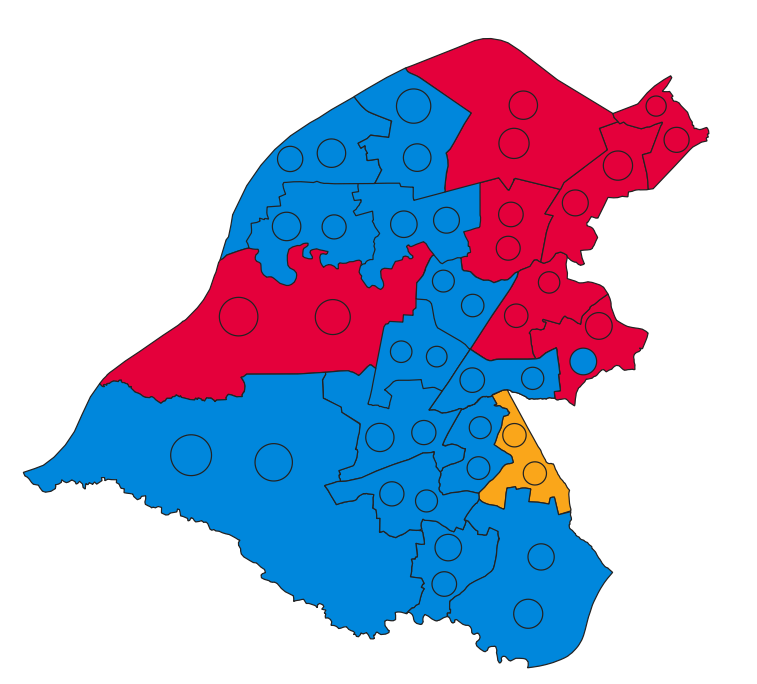
- Map of results of 2004 election
Leader of the Council before election
David Acton
Labour
Leader of the Council after election
Susan Fildes
Conservative

Elections to Trafford Metropolitan Borough Council were held on 10 June 2004.

Due to demographic changes in the Borough since its formation in 1973, and in common with most other English Councils in 2004, substantial boundary changes were implemented in time for these elections. The most notable changes were as follows:

- Most of the former wards of Park and Talbot were merged to form a new Gorse Hill ward.
- Most of the former wards of Bucklow and St. Martins were merged to form a new Bucklow – St. Martins ward.
- The Hale ward ceased to exist, and two new wards were created from most of its area: Hale Barns and Hale Central.
- The Mersey St. Marys ward ceased to exist, and two new wards were created from most of its area: Ashton on Mersey and St. Marys.

Due to these changes, it was necessary for the whole Council to be re-elected for the first time since 1973. Each ward elected three candidates, with the first-placed candidate serving a four-year term of office, expiring in 2008, the second-placed candidate serving a three-year term of office, expiring in 2007, and the third-placed candidate serving a two-year term of office, expiring in 2006. The Conservative Party gained overall control of the council from no overall control. Overall turnout was 46.3%.

== Election result ==
Party	Votes		Seats		
Conservative Party	96,079 (53.0%)	▲7.1	40 (63.5%)	40 / 63	▲12
Labour Party	52,509 (29.0%)	▼6.7	20 (31.7%)	20 / 63	▼11
Liberal Democrats	28,011 (15.5%)	▲2.0	3 (4.8%)	3 / 63	▼1
Green Party	3,700 (2.0%)	▼2.4	0 (0.0%)	0 / 63	Steady
BNP	786 (0.4%)	N/A	0 (0.0%)	0 / 63	N/A
Socialist Labour Party	135 (0.1%)	Steady	0 (0.0%)	0 / 63	Steady

↓
20	3	40

== Ward results ==
=== Altrincham ===
Altrincham (3 Councillors)
Party	Candidate	Votes	%	±%
Conservative	Susan Fildes*	1,837	52.0	
Conservative	Alexander Williams*	1,670	47.3	
Conservative	Stephen Ogden	1,642	46.5	
Labour	John Graham	1,137	32.2	
Liberal Democrats	Roger Legge	949	26.9	
Majority		505	14.3	
Turnout		3,533	47.2	
Conservative win (new seat)				
Conservative win (new seat)				
Conservative win (new seat)				

=== Ashton upon Mersey ===
Ashton upon Mersey (3 Councillors)
Party	Candidate	Votes	%	±%
Conservative	Brian Rigby*	1,817	50.3	
Conservative	Michael Whetton	1,680	46.5	
Conservative	John Lamb*	1,534	42.5	
Labour	Simon Beaumont*	969	26.8	
Labour	Joyce Eaton	968	26.8	
Liberal Democrats	Terence Corbett	798	22.1	
Labour	Tahira Rasul	798	22.1	
Green	Michael Addelman	585	16.2	
Majority		565	15.6	
Turnout		3,611	49.9	
Conservative win (new seat)				
Conservative win (new seat)				
Conservative win (new seat)				

=== Bowdon ===
Bowdon (3 Councillors)
Party	Candidate	Votes	%	±%
Conservative	David Merrell*	2,454	64.5	
Conservative	Stephanie Poole*	2,402	63.1	
Conservative	Paula Pearson*	2,345	61.6	
Liberal Democrats	Ian Chappell	899	23.6	
Labour	Thomas Hague	590	15.5	
Green	Margaret Westbrook	546	14.3	
Majority		1,446	38.0	
Turnout		3,806	53.7	
Conservative win (new seat)				
Conservative win (new seat)				
Conservative win (new seat)				

=== Broadheath ===
Broadheath (3 Councillors)
Party	Candidate	Votes	%	±%
Conservative	Brenda Houraghan*	1,905	52.6	
Conservative	Kenneth Weston*	1,833	50.6	
Conservative	James Pearson	1,686	46.6	
Labour	Ian Golding	1,193	33.0	
Labour	Helen Walsh	1,081	29.9	
Labour	Martin Williams	968	26.7	
Liberal Democrats	Bryn Mallion	621	17.2	
Majority		493	13.6	
Turnout		3,619	45.3	
Conservative win (new seat)				
Conservative win (new seat)				
Conservative win (new seat)				

=== Brooklands ===
Brooklands (3 Councillors)
Party	Candidate	Votes	%	±%
Conservative	Kathleen Bullock*	2,196	58.1	
Conservative	David Higgins*	2,154	57.0	
Conservative	Pamela Dixon*	1,962	51.9	
Liberal Democrats	David Rhodes	1,296	34.3	
BNP	Andrew Harris	260	6.9	
Majority		666	17.6	
Turnout		3,782	49.4	
Conservative win (new seat)				
Conservative win (new seat)				
Conservative win (new seat)				

=== Bucklow-St. Martin's ===
Bucklow-St. Martins (3 Councillors)
Party	Candidate	Votes	%	±%
Labour	Ian Platt*	1,406	58.6	
Labour	Graham Kanes*	1,326	55.3	
Labour	David Quayle*	1,287	53.7	
Conservative	Anne Cavanagh	686	28.6	
Conservative	James Davies	685	28.6	
Conservative	Richard Kellett	647	27.0	
Majority		601	25.1	
Turnout		2,398	34.7	
Labour win (new seat)				
Labour win (new seat)				
Labour win (new seat)				

=== Clifford ===
Clifford (3 Councillors)
Party	Candidate	Votes	%	±%
Labour	Eunice Whitfield Stennett*	1,155	39.1	
Labour	Ejaz Malik	1,122	37.9	
Labour	Andrea Jones*	1,071	36.2	
Liberal Democrats	Mohammad Butt	785	26.5	
Liberal Democrats	Victor De Souza	741	25.1	
Liberal Democrats	Choudhrry Yousaf	704	23.8	
Green	John Westbrook	350	11.8	
Green	Bridget Green	289	9.8	
Conservative	John Gregory	288	9.7	
Conservative	Shirley Dirikis	269	9.1	
Conservative	Martin Massey	248	8.4	
Green	Samuel Little	212	7.2	
Majority		286	9.7	
Turnout		2,957	41.7	
Labour win (new seat)				
Labour win (new seat)				
Labour win (new seat)				

=== Davyhulme East ===
Davyhulme East (3 Councillors)
Party	Candidate	Votes	%	±%
Conservative	Edith Eadie*	2,007	57.1	
Conservative	Gary Brockbanks	1,979	56.3	
Conservative	Michael Cornes*	1,968	56.0	
Labour	Shirley Procter	987	28.1	
Labour	Jeanette McLaughlin	785	22.3	
Labour	Arikoti Chikoti	698	19.9	
Liberal Democrats	Graham Rogers	518	14.7	
Socialist Labour	James Flannery	135	3.8	
Majority		981	27.9	
Turnout		3,516	45.6	
Conservative win (new seat)				
Conservative win (new seat)				
Conservative win (new seat)				

=== Davyhulme West ===
Davyhulme West (3 Councillors)
Party	Candidate	Votes	%	±%
Conservative	John Ackerley*	1,977	54.3	
Conservative	John Reilly*	1,948	53.5	
Conservative	June Reilly*	1,921	52.7	
Labour	Freda Mottley	1,024	28.1	
Labour	Philip Morgan	1,002	27.5	
Labour	Kevin Procter	930	25.5	
Liberal Democrats	Simon Wright	555	15.2	
Majority		897	24.6	
Turnout		3,642	48.5	
Conservative win (new seat)				
Conservative win (new seat)				
Conservative win (new seat)				

=== Flixton ===
Flixton (3 Councillors)
Party	Candidate	Votes	%	±%
Conservative	Keith Summerfield*	1,952	49.2	
Conservative	Jonathan Coupe*	1,915	48.3	
Conservative	Elsie Ward*	1,885	47.5	
Labour	Gerard Carter	1,227	30.9	
Labour	Dolores O'Sullivan	1,175	29.6	
Labour	Nigel Roberts	1,095	27.6	
Liberal Democrats	Alan Vernon	819	20.7	
Majority		658	16.6	
Turnout		3,965	48.6	
Conservative win (new seat)				
Conservative win (new seat)				
Conservative win (new seat)				

=== Gorse Hill ===
Gorse Hill (3 Councillors)
Party	Candidate	Votes	%	±%
Labour	Mary Strickland*	1,245	49.6	
Labour	Laurence Walsh*	1,222	48.7	
Labour	David Acton*	1,139	45.4	
Conservative	Alison Levenston	687	27.4	
Conservative	Colin Levenston	654	26.1	
Conservative	Graeme Levenston	614	24.5	
Liberal Democrats	Hazel Shacklock	573	22.8	
Majority		452	18.0	
Turnout		2,509	32.8	
Labour win (new seat)				
Labour win (new seat)				
Labour win (new seat)				

=== Hale Barns ===
Hale Barns (3 Councillors)
Party	Candidate	Votes	%	±%
Conservative	Ian Mullins*	2,515	63.1	
Conservative	Bernard Sharp	2,223	55.8	
Conservative	Dilriaz Butt	1,917	48.1	
Liberal Democrats	Barry Hepburn*	1,567	39.3	
Majority		350	8.8	
Turnout		3,985	53.8	
Conservative win (new seat)				
Conservative win (new seat)				
Conservative win (new seat)				

=== Hale Central ===
Hale Central (3 Councillors)
Party	Candidate	Votes	%	±%
Conservative	Colin Foster	2,069	57.6	
Conservative	Patricia Young	1,967	54.8	
Conservative	Alan Mitchell	1,912	53.2	
Liberal Democrats	Richard Elliott	1,042	29.0	
Labour	Beverly Harrison	880	24.5	
Majority		870	24.2	
Turnout		3,592	51.6	
Conservative win (new seat)				
Conservative win (new seat)				
Conservative win (new seat)				

=== Longford ===
Longford (3 Councillors)
Party	Candidate	Votes	%	±%
Labour	Judith Lloyd*	1,379	42.1	
Labour	Pauleen Lane*	1,288	39.3	
Labour	David Jarman*	1,286	39.3	
Conservative	Roderick Allan	948	28.9	
Conservative	Edward Kelson	889	27.1	
Conservative	Geoffrey Harding	846	25.8	
Liberal Democrats	Waseem Akram	654	20.0	
Liberal Democrats	Francis Beswick	591	18.0	
Liberal Democrats	Eric Haughton	576	17.6	
Green	Anne Power	362	11.1	
Green	Bernard Kelly	354	10.8	
Green	Stephen Parker	287	8.8	
Majority		338	10.3	
Turnout		3,276	40.1	
Labour win (new seat)				
Labour win (new seat)				
Labour win (new seat)				

=== Priory ===
Priory (3 Councillors)
Party	Candidate	Votes	%	±%
Labour	Barry Brotherton*	1,413	38.1	
Labour	Roland Griffin*	1,320	35.6	
Labour	Jane Baugh*	1,248	33.7	
Conservative	Joseph Garner	1,135	30.6	
Conservative	Hugh Pitcher	1,063	28.7	
Liberal Democrats	John Hunter	932	25.1	
Conservative	Saleem Bhatti	923	24.9	
Liberal Democrats	Michael Riley	821	22.1	
Liberal Democrats	Derek Hurst	771	20.8	
BNP	Jason Gough	232	6.3	
Majority		113	3.0	
Turnout		3,707	51.4	
Labour win (new seat)				
Labour win (new seat)				
Labour win (new seat)				

=== Sale Moor ===
Sale Moor (3 Councillors)
Party	Candidate	Votes	%	±%
Labour	Philip Gratrix*	1,219	36.3	
Labour	Joanne Bennett	1,198	35.6	
Conservative	Christine Bailey	1,172	34.9	
Conservative	Pervez Nakvi	1,116	33.2	
Conservative	John Schofield	1,105	32.9	
Labour	Munaver Rasul*	1,007	30.0	
Liberal Democrats	Margaret Clarke	688	20.5	
Liberal Democrats	Kenneth Clarke	659	19.6	
Liberal Democrats	Colin Bearfield	650	19.3	
Majority		56	1.8	
Turnout		3,362	44.4	
Labour win (new seat)				
Labour win (new seat)				
Conservative win (new seat)				

=== St. Mary's ===
St. Mary's (3 Councillors)
Party	Candidate	Votes	%	±%
Conservative	John Holden	1,926	49.1	
Conservative	Daniel Bunting	1,912	48.7	
Conservative	John Tolhurst*	1,754	44.7	
Labour	Leonard Murkin*	1,237	31.5	
Labour	Sophie Taylor	1,073	27.3	
Labour	Angela Gray*	963	24.5	
Liberal Democrats	Diane Hibberd	641	16.3	
BNP	Dorothy Gough	294	7.5	
Majority		517	13.2	
Turnout		3,924	47.2	
Conservative win (new seat)				
Conservative win (new seat)				
Conservative win (new seat)				

=== Stretford ===
Stretford (3 Councillors)
Party	Candidate	Votes	%	±%
Labour	Bernice Garlick*	1,299	45.9	
Labour	Stephen Adshead*	1,242	43.9	
Labour	Karina Carter	1,036	36.6	
Conservative	Benita Dirikis	966	34.1	
Conservative	George Manley	948	33.5	
Conservative	Colin Hooley	945	33.4	
Liberal Democrats	Mohammed Mian	449	15.7	
Majority		70	2.5	
Turnout		2,831	37.1	
Labour win (new seat)				
Labour win (new seat)				
Labour win (new seat)				

=== Timperley ===
Timperley (3 Councillors)
Party	Candidate	Votes	%	±%
Conservative	Anne Bowker*	2,145	50.0	
Conservative	Matthew Colledge	2,045	47.7	
Conservative	Arthur Davies*	2,025	47.2	
Liberal Democrats	Catherine Smith	1,329	31.0	
Liberal Democrats	Nichola Bairstow	1,277	29.8	
Liberal Democrats	Christopher Gaskell	970	22.6	
Labour	Peter Baugh	869	20.3	
Majority		696	16.2	
Turnout		4,288	52.4	
Conservative win (new seat)				
Conservative win (new seat)				
Conservative win (new seat)				

=== Urmston ===
Urmston (3 Councillors)
Party	Candidate	Votes	%	±%
Conservative	Christine Turner	1,747	44.1	
Conservative	Angela Roberts	1,678	42.3	
Conservative	James Wibberley	1,658	41.8	
Labour	Joyce Acton*	1,549	39.1	
Labour	William Clarke*	1,434	36.2	
Labour	Ian McDermott*	1,366	34.5	
Green	Helen Jocys	715	18.0	
Majority		109	2.7	
Turnout		3,964	50.9	
Conservative win (new seat)				
Conservative win (new seat)				
Conservative win (new seat)				

=== Village ===
Village (3 Councillors)
Party	Candidate	Votes	%	±%
Liberal Democrats	Raymond Bowker*	1,875	53.3	
Liberal Democrats	Jane Brophy*	1,672	47.5	
Liberal Democrats	Douglas Fishwick*	1,589	45.2	
Conservative	Kenneth Bullman	1,119	31.8	
Conservative	David Pate	1,006	28.6	
Conservative	Clive Feingold	958	27.2	
Labour	Tom Ross	603	17.1	
Majority		470	13.4	
Turnout		3,517	47.1	
Liberal Democrats win (new seat)				
Liberal Democrats win (new seat)				
Liberal Democrats win (new seat)				

== By-elections between 2004 and 2006 ==
Davyhulme West By-Election 25 November 2004
Party	Candidate	Votes	%	±%
Conservative	Nigel Hooley	1,070	52.2	−3.4
Labour	Bill Clarke	757	36.9	+8.1
Liberal Democrats	Alan Vernon	222	10.8	−4.8
Majority		313	15.3	−13.5
Turnout		2,049	27.2	−21.3
Conservative hold		Swing		

Timperley By-Election 25 November 2004
Party	Candidate	Votes	%	±%
Conservative	Ken Bullman	1,152	51.2	+1.8
Liberal Democrats	Ian Chappell	750	33.3	+2.5
Labour	Tom Ross	349	15.5	−4.5
Majority		402	17.9	−1.7
Turnout		2,251	27.3	−25.1
Conservative hold		Swing		
