= 2012 Trafford Metropolitan Borough Council election =

2012 UK local government election

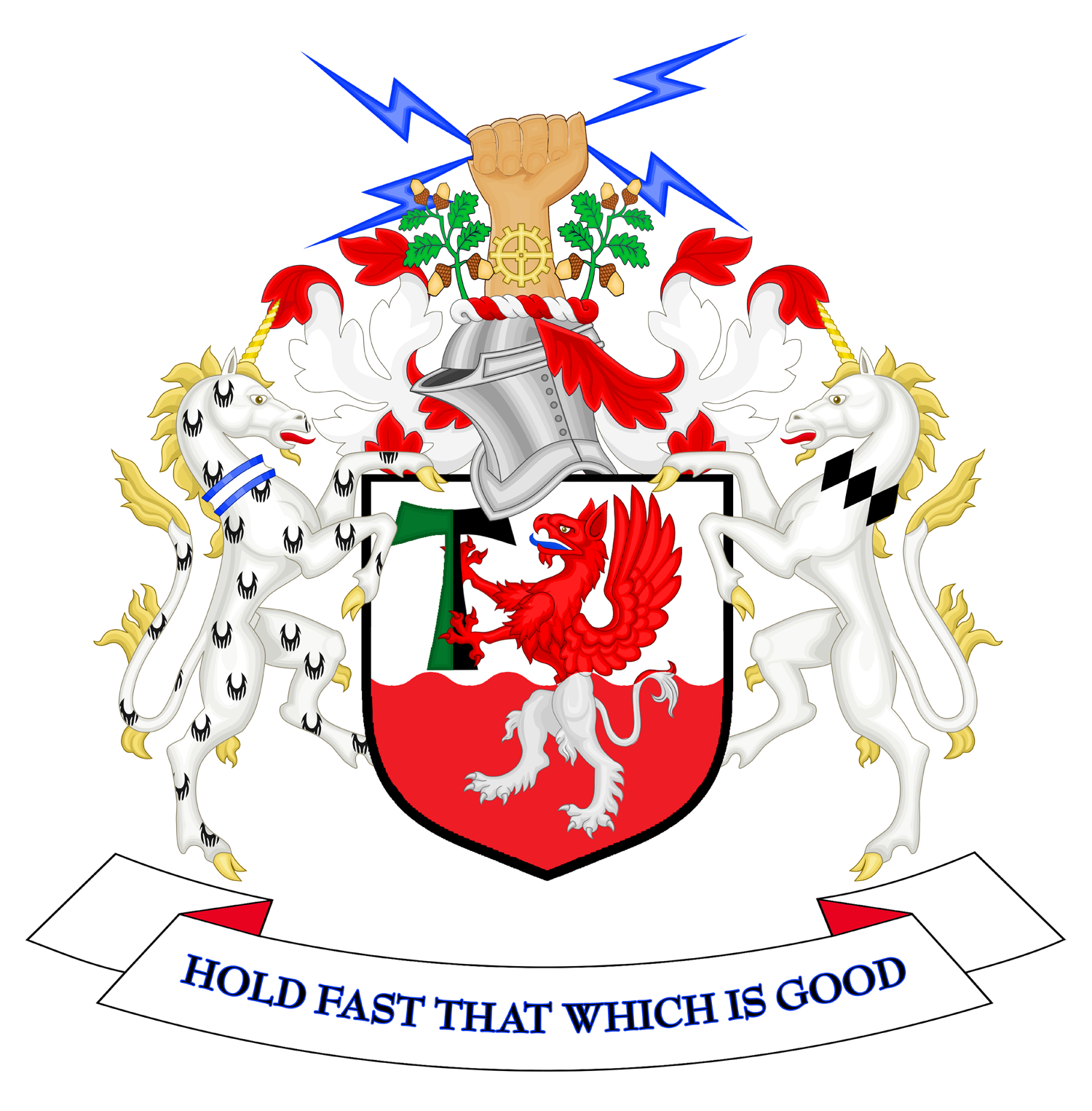
- 3 May 2012

21 of 63 seats to Trafford Metropolitan Borough Council 32 seats needed for a majority
	First party	Second party	Third party
Leader	Matt Colledge	David Acton	Ray Bowker
Party	Conservative	Labour	Liberal Democrats
Leader's seat	Altrincham	Gorse Hill	Village
Last election	14 seats, 43.1%	8 seats, 39.4%	0 seats, 9.9%
Seats before	37	22	4
Seats won	10	9	2
Seats after	34	25	4
Seat change	▼3	▲3	Steady
Popular vote	23,689	25,100	5,605
Percentage	39.5%	41.8%	9.3%
Swing	▼3.6%	▲2.4%	▼0.6%
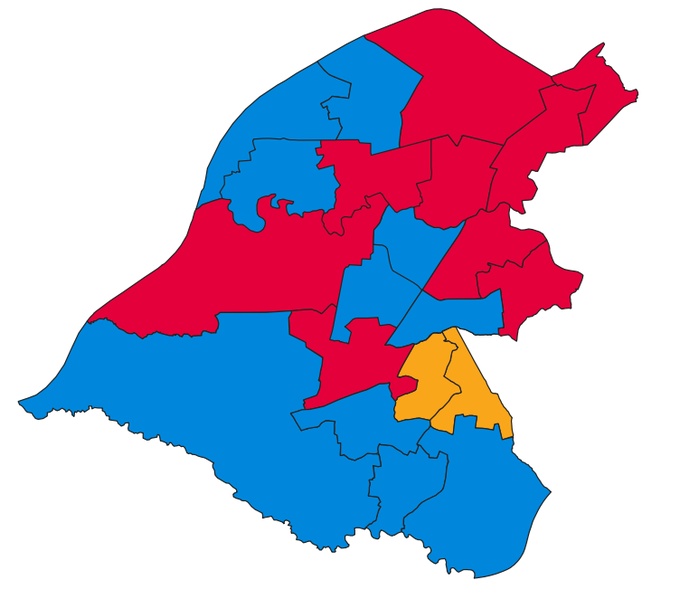
- Map of results of 2012 election
Leader of the Council before election
Matt Colledge
Conservative
Leader of the Council after election
Matt Colledge
Conservative

Elections to Trafford Metropolitan Borough Council were held on 3 May 2012. One third of the council was up for election, with each successful candidate serving a four-year term of office, expiring in 2016. The Conservative Party held overall control of the council.

== Election result ==
Party	Votes		Seats			Full Council	
Conservative Party	23,689 (39.5%)	▼3.6	10 (47.6%)	10 / 21	▼3	34 (54.0%)	34 / 63
Labour Party	25,100 (41.8%)	▲2.4	9 (42.9%)	9 / 21	▲3	25 (39.7%)	25 / 63
Liberal Democrats	5,605 (9.3%)	▼0.6	2 (9.5%)	2 / 21	Steady	4 (6.3%)	4 / 63
Green Party	4,505 (7.5%)	▲0.6	0 (0.0%)	0 / 21	Steady	0 (0.0%)	0 / 63
UKIP	1,001 (1.7%)	▲1.0	0 (0.0%)	0 / 21	Steady	0 (0.0%)	0 / 63
Independent	117 (0.2%)	N/A	0 (0.0%)	0 / 21	N/A	0 (0.0%)	0 / 63

↓
25	4	34

== Ward results ==
=== Altrincham ward ===
Altrincham
Party	Candidate	Votes	%	±%
Conservative	Alex Williams*	1,446	51.3	+0.9
Labour	Aidan Williams	933	33.1	+3.2
Green	Deborah Leftwich	252	8.9	+1.0
Liberal Democrats	Julian Newgrosh	190	6.7	−5.2
Majority		513	18.2	+2.2
Turnout		2,821	34.8	−7.7
Conservative hold		Swing		

=== Ashton upon Mersey ward ===
Ashton upon Mersey
Party	Candidate	Votes	%	±%
Conservative	Brian Rigby*	1,396	50.1	−0.4
Labour	Michael Wilton	992	35.6	+1.4
Green	Joseph Westbrook	235	8.4	+1.7
Liberal Democrats	Christopher Marritt	161	5.8	−2.7
Majority		404	14.5	−1.8
Turnout		2,784	39.0	−7.3
Conservative hold		Swing		

=== Bowdon ward ===
Bowdon
Party	Candidate	Votes	%	±%
Conservative	Sean Anstee*	1,885	68.3	−2.4
Labour	Thomas Hague	432	15.6	+0.3
Green	Bridget Green	257	9.3	+2.2
Liberal Democrats	Kirstie Davidson	187	6.8	−0.1
Majority		1,453	52.6	−2.8
Turnout		2,761	38.8	−9.8
Conservative hold		Swing		

=== Broadheath ward ===
Broadheath
Party	Candidate	Votes	%	±%
Labour	Denise Western	1,662	46.3	+5.9
Conservative	Brenda Houraghan*	1,397	38.9	−4.3
UKIP	John Walsh	221	6.2	+1.5
Green	Sara Ahsan	156	4.3	−0.3
Liberal Democrats	Pauline Cliff	152	4.2	−2.9
Majority		265	7.4	+4.6
Turnout		3,588	38.8	−7.1
Labour gain from Conservative		Swing		

=== Brooklands ward ===
Brooklands
Party	Candidate	Votes	%	±%
Conservative	Chris Boyes	1,421	48.1	−4.6
Labour	Louise Dagnall	972	32.9	+1.9
Green	David Eatock	247	8.4	+2.4
Liberal Democrats	Michael McDonald	197	6.7	−3.7
Independent	Colin Bearfield	117	4.0	+4.0
Majority		449	15.2	−6.5
Turnout		2,954	38.6	−9.1
Conservative hold		Swing		

=== Bucklow-St. Martins ward ===
Bucklow-St. Martins
Party	Candidate	Votes	%	±%
Labour	Ian Platt*	1,238	67.1	+3.8
Conservative	Lee Peck	393	21.3	−3.2
Green	Daniel Wadsworth	110	6.0	−0.8
Liberal Democrats	Graham Rogers	105	5.7	+0.3
Majority		845	45.8	+6.9
Turnout		1,846	27.8	−3.8
Labour hold		Swing		

=== Clifford ward ===
Clifford
Party	Candidate	Votes	%	±%
Labour	Eunice Whitfield Stennett*	2,035	79.8	+3.6
Green	Anne Power	284	11.1	−0.6
Conservative	James Heywood	173	6.8	−1.3
Liberal Democrats	Louise Bird	59	2.3	−1.7
Majority		1,751	68.6	+4.1
Turnout		2,551	35.4	−4.2
Labour hold		Swing		

=== Davyhulme East ward ===
Davyhulme East
Party	Candidate	Votes	%	±%
Conservative	Linda Blackburn*	1,480	49.3	−1.7
Labour	Helen Simpson	1,295	43.1	+1.1
Green	Jennie Wadsworth	155	5.2	+1.3
Liberal Democrats	Kenneth Clarke	75	2.5	−0.5
Majority		185	6.2	−2.8
Turnout		3,005	40.6	−4.1
Conservative hold		Swing		

=== Davyhulme West ward ===
Davyhulme West
Party	Candidate	Votes	%	±%
Conservative	Brian Shaw*	1,345	47.1	−4.4
Labour	George Devlin	1,241	43.4	+4.4
Green	Christine McLaughlin	196	6.9	+1.1
Liberal Democrats	Elizabeth Hogg	75	2.6	−1.1
Majority		104	3.6	−8.9
Turnout		2,857	39.1	−3.8
Conservative hold		Swing		

=== Flixton ward ===
Flixton
Party	Candidate	Votes	%	±%
Conservative	Paul Lally	1,481	46.3	−1.6
Labour	Freda Mottley	1,330	41.6	+1.4
Green	Alison Cavanagh	294	9.2	+1.4
Liberal Democrats	Richard Elliott	94	2.9	−1.2
Majority		151	4.7	−3.0
Turnout		3,199	39.5	−4.3
Conservative hold		Swing		

=== Gorse Hill ward ===
Gorse Hill
Party	Candidate	Votes	%	±%
Labour	Laurence Walsh*	1,633	71.7	+3.9
Conservative	Samuel Martin	368	16.2	−3.3
Green	Philip Leape	196	8.6	+1.1
Liberal Democrats	Renee Matthews	81	3.6	−1.6
Majority		1,265	55.5	+7.3
Turnout		2,278	31.1	−1.8
Labour hold		Swing		

=== Hale Barns ward ===
Hale Barns
Party	Candidate	Votes	%	±%
Conservative	Patrick Myers*	1,774	62.8	−5.7
Labour Co-op	Barbara Twiney	438	15.5	+0.1
Liberal Democrats	Sandra Taylor	256	9.1	−1.9
UKIP	Andrew Weighell	214	7.6	+7.6
Green	Sarah McIlroy	142	5.0	−0.1
Majority		1,336	47.3	−5.8
Turnout		2,824	38.7	−8.1
Conservative hold		Swing		

=== Hale Central ward ===
Hale Central
Party	Candidate	Votes	%	±%
Conservative	Chris Candish*	1,484	58.1	−0.9
Labour Co-op	Beverley Harrison	569	22.3	+0.6
Green	Samuel Little	303	11.9	+2.4
Liberal Democrats	Craig Birtwistle	200	7.8	−2.0
Majority		915	35.8	−1.5
Turnout		2,556	34.9	−11.0
Conservative hold		Swing		

=== Longford ward ===
Longford
Party	Candidate	Votes	%	±%
Labour	Judith Lloyd*	1,885	65.3	+2.3
Conservative	Alex Finney	532	18.4	−2.7
Green	Margaret Westbrook	375	13.0	+1.8
Liberal Democrats	Barbara Doyle	96	3.3	−1.4
Majority		1,353	46.8	+4.9
Turnout		2,888	35.0	−4.9
Labour hold		Swing		

=== Priory ward ===
Priory
Party	Candidate	Votes	%	±%
Labour Co-op	Barry Brotherton*	1,471	51.8	+8.5
Conservative	Dave Hopps	879	31.0	+2.5
Liberal Democrats	William Jones	255	9.0	−8.8
Green	Paul Bayliss	235	8.3	−2.1
Majority		592	20.8	+6.0
Turnout		2,840	37.4	−6.5
Labour hold		Swing		

=== Sale Moor ward ===
Sale Moor
Party	Candidate	Votes	%	±%
Labour	Mike Freeman	1,355	49.1	+1.8
Conservative	Nigel Hooley*	1,032	37.4	−2.5
Green	Nigel Woodcock	205	7.4	+1.4
Liberal Democrats	Joseph Carter	168	6.1	−0.7
Majority		323	11.7	+4.3
Turnout		2,760	37.9	−3.8
Labour gain from Conservative		Swing		

=== St. Mary's ward ===
St. Mary's
Party	Candidate	Votes	%	±%
Conservative	John Holden*	1,285	43.0	−7.4
Labour	Simon Buckley	1,266	42.4	+7.0
UKIP	Stephen Farndon	203	6.8	+1.1
Liberal Democrats	Jordan Cooper	122	4.1	−1.3
Green	Joseph Ryan	111	3.7	+0.6
Majority		19	0.6	−14.4
Turnout		2,987	35.2	−4.8
Conservative hold		Swing		

=== Stretford ward ===
Stretford
Party	Candidate	Votes	%	±%
Labour	Tom Ross*	1,666	62.4	+1.2
Conservative	Michael Parris	475	17.8	−6.6
Green	Liz O'Neill	266	10.0	+0.5
UKIP	Jan Brzozowski	167	6.3	+6.3
Liberal Democrats	Kirsty Cullen	95	3.6	−1.3
Majority		1,191	44.6	+7.8
Turnout		2,669	35.6	−4.7
Labour hold		Swing		

=== Timperley ward ===
Timperley
Party	Candidate	Votes	%	±%
Liberal Democrats	Jane Brophy*	1,553	43.4	+12.4
Conservative	Mal Choudhury	1,246	34.8	−8.0
Labour	Majella Dalton-Bartley	630	17.6	−4.1
Green	Jadwiga Leigh	150	4.2	−0.3
Majority		307	8.6	−3.2
Turnout		3,579	42.9	−7.7
Liberal Democrats hold		Swing		

=== Urmston ward ===
Urmston
Party	Candidate	Votes	%	±%
Labour	Catherine Hynes	1,453	45.6	−2.7
Conservative	Christine Turner*	1,304	41.0	+2.1
UKIP	Robert Rawcliffe	196	6.2	+2.5
Green	Paul Syrett	145	4.6	−0.7
Liberal Democrats	Alan Sherliker	86	2.7	−1.1
Majority		149	4.7	−4.6
Turnout		3,184	40.4	−5.6
Labour gain from Conservative		Swing		

=== Village ward ===
Village
Party	Candidate	Votes	%	±%
Liberal Democrats	Ray Bowker*	1,398	45.3	+11.9
Conservative	Matthew Sephton	893	28.9	−6.2
Labour	Helen Boyle	604	19.6	−6.6
Green	Michael Leigh	191	6.2	+0.9
Majority		505	16.4	+14.6
Turnout		3,086	41.0	−3.1
Liberal Democrats hold		Swing		

== By-elections between 2012 and 2014 ==
Broadheath By-Election 16 January 2014
Party	Candidate	Votes	%	±%
Labour	Helen Boyle	1,377	44.5	−1.8
Conservative	Brenda Houraghan	1,258	40.6	+1.8
UKIP	Ron George	234	7.5	+1.3
Liberal Democrats	Will Jones	150	4.8	+0.4
Green	Joe Ryan	67	2.2	−2.1
Majority		119	3.8	−3.6
Turnout		3,097	30.3	−8.5
Labour gain from Conservative		Swing		
