= 2021 Trafford Metropolitan Borough Council election =

2021 local election in England

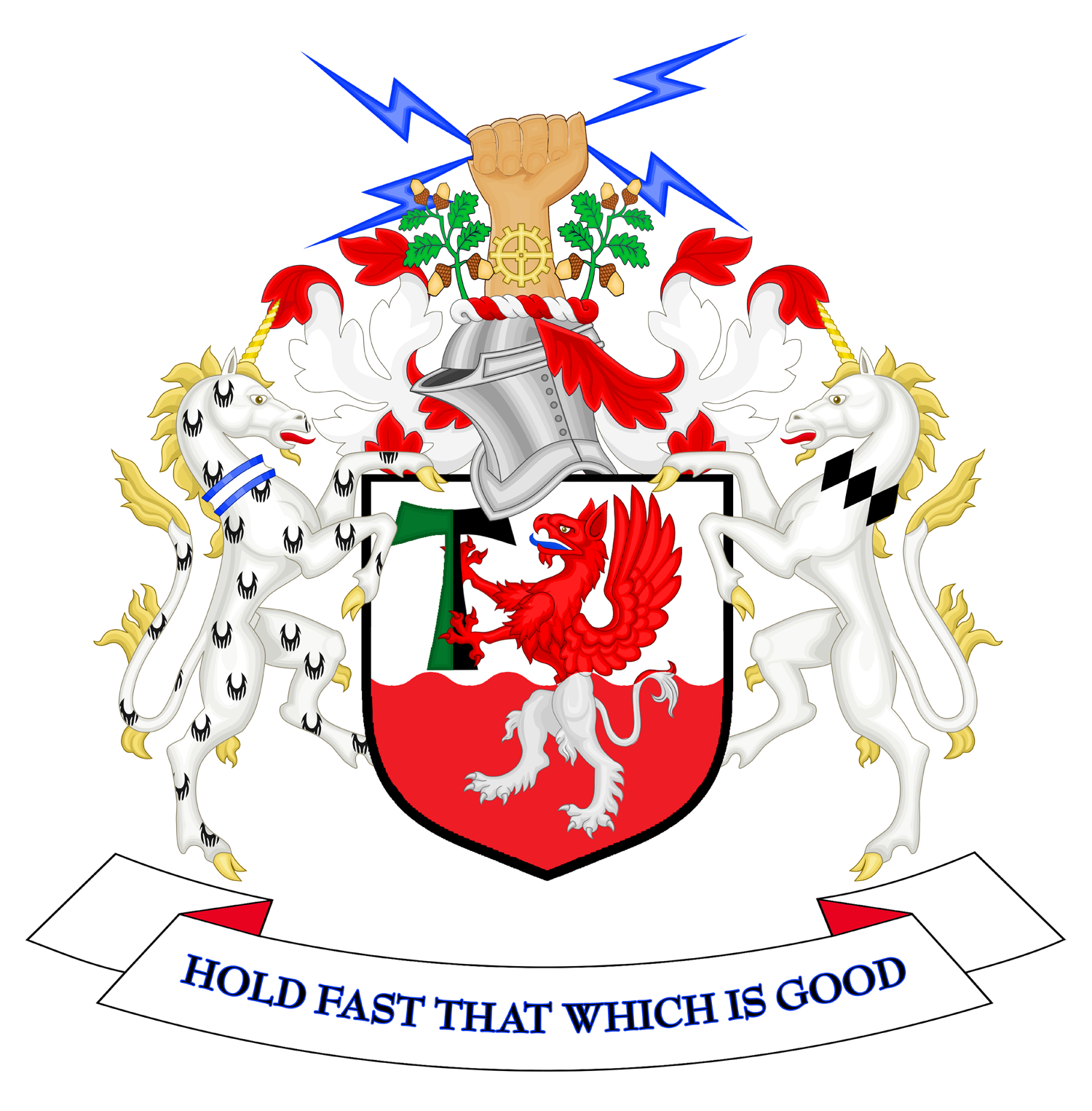
- 6 May 2021

25 of 63 seats to Trafford Metropolitan Borough Council 32 seats needed for a majority
	First party	Second party	Third party
Leader	Andrew Western	Nathan Evans	Geraldine Coggins
Party	Labour	Conservative	Green
Leader's seat	Priory	Timperley	Altrincham
Last election	14 seats, 41.3%	4 seats, 29.4%	1 seats, 12.6%
Seats before	35	20	3
Seats won	16	7	1
Seats after	40	17	3
Seat change	▲5	▼3	Steady
Popular vote	40,453	29,906	11,167
Percentage	45.5%	33.6%	12.5%
Swing	▲4.2%	▲4.2%	▼0.1%
	Fourth party
Leader	Julian Newgrosh
Party	Liberal Democrats
Leader's seat	Village
Last election	2 seats, 10.6%
Seats before	3
Seats won	1
Seats after	3
Seat change	Steady
Popular vote	7,101
Percentage	8.0%
Swing	▼2.6%
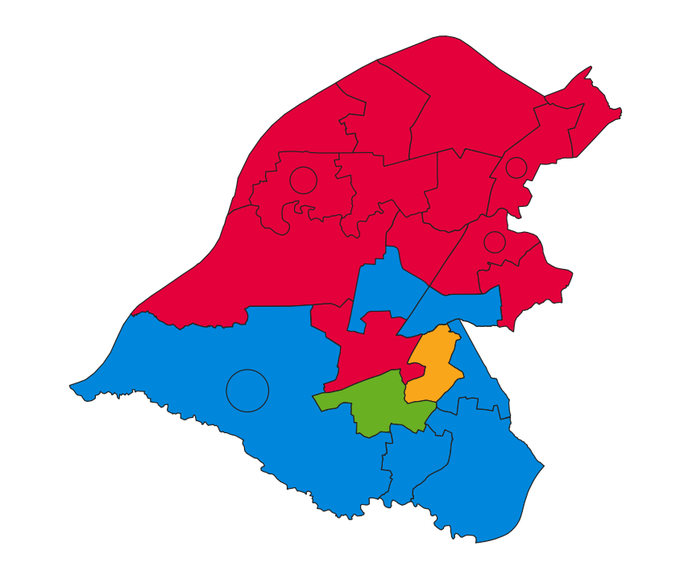
- Map of results of 2021 election
Leader of the Council before election
Andrew Western
Labour
Leader of the Council after election
Andrew Western
Labour

The 2021 Trafford Metropolitan Borough Council election to elect members of Trafford Metropolitan Borough Council in England took place on 6 May 2021. As with many other local elections in England, it was postponed from May 2020, due to the COVID-19 pandemic.

One third of council seats were contested in the election, with each successful candidate serving a two-year term of office rather than the normal four due to a boundary review to be implemented in 2023. Four additional seats were also contested in concurrent by-elections; seats which had become vacant due to deaths and resignations.

== Election result ==
Party	Votes		Seats			Full Council	
Labour Party	40,453 (45.5%)	▲4.2	16 (64.0%)	16 / 25	▲5	40 (63.5%)	40 / 63
Conservative Party	29,906 (33.6%)	▲4.2	7 (28.0%)	7 / 25	▼3	17 (27.0%)	17 / 63
Green Party	11,167 (12.5%)	▼0.1	1 (4.0%)	1 / 25	Steady	3 (4.8%)	3 / 63
Liberal Democrats	7,101 (8.0%)	▼2.6	1 (4.0%)	1 / 25	Steady	3 (4.8%)	3 / 63
Women's Equality Party	134 (0.2%)	N/A	0 (0.0%)	0 / 25	N/A	0 (0.0%)	0 / 63
Independent	120 (0.1%)	▼0.3	0 (0.0%)	0 / 25	Steady	0 (0.0%)	0 / 63
UKIP	75 (0.1%)	▼5.1	0 (0.0%)	0 / 25	Steady	0 (0.0%)	0 / 63
The Democratic Network	42 (0.1%)	N/A	0 (0.0%)	0 / 25	N/A	0 (0.0%)	0 / 63

↓
40	3	3	17

== Ward results ==
=== Altrincham ward ===
Altrincham
Party	Candidate	Votes	%	±%
Green	Geraldine Coggins*	2,387	55.8	▼5.5
Conservative	Shengke Zhi	1,227	28.7	▲1.4
Labour	Ben Slater	567	13.2	▲5.1
Liberal Democrats	David Martin	93	2.1	▼1.2
Majority		1,160	27.1	▼7.0
Registered electors		9,189		
Turnout		4,274	46.81	▲2.85
Green hold		Swing	▼3.5%	

=== Ashton upon Mersey ward ===
Ashton upon Mersey
Party	Candidate	Votes	%	±%
Labour	Shona Gilbert	1,938	47.3	▲4.4
Conservative	Kay Dwyer	1,722	42.0	▲2.9
Green	Caroline Robertson-Brown	314	7.7	▲0.1
Liberal Democrats	John Lovell	122	6.9	▲3.0
Majority		216	5.2	▲2.2
Registered electors		7,699		
Turnout		4,121	53.5	▲5.66
Labour gain from Conservative		Swing		

=== Bowdon ward ===
Bowdon (2 vacancies)
Party	Candidate	Votes	%	±%
Conservative	Mussadak Mirza	1,814	54.0	
Conservative	Michael Whetton	1,763	52.5	
Green	Bridget Green	684	20.4	
Labour	Thomas Hague	672	20.0	
Labour	Charles Mayer	471	14.0	
Green	Martin Skelton	331	9.9	
Liberal Democrats	Ludo Tolhurst-Cleaver	226	6.7	
Liberal Democrats	Mario Emanuele Miniaci	216	6.4	
Majority		1,130		
Majority		1,091		
Registered electors		7,316		
Turnout		3,396	46.4	▲6.0
Conservative hold		Swing		
Conservative hold		Swing		

=== Broadheath ward ===
Broadheath
Party	Candidate	Votes	%	±%
Labour	Denise Western*	2,260	48.9	▲1.6
Conservative	Kaushik Chakraborty	1,708	36.9	▲6.6
Green	Philip Young	319	6.9	▼1.7
Liberal Democrats	Christopher Paul	216	4.7	▼0.7
Independent	Stephen Farndon	120	2.6	▲0.5
Majority		552	11.9	▼5.0
Registered electors		10,149		
Turnout		4,646	45.8	▲5.16
Labour hold		Swing		

=== Brooklands ward ===
Brooklands
Party	Candidate	Votes	%	±%
Conservative	Chris Boyes*	1,894	44.7	▲9.3
Labour	Fianna Hornby	1,875	44.4	▲1.0
Green	Joe Ryan	255	5.3	▼3.1
Liberal Democrats	Pauline Cliff	206	2.9	▼5.2
Majority		19	0.4	▼3.0
Registered electors		7,831		
Turnout		4,255	54.3	▲6.7
Conservative hold		Swing		

=== Bucklow-St. Martins ward ===
Bucklow-St. Martins
Party	Candidate	Votes	%	±%
Labour	James Wright*	1,244	60.3	▲5.7
Conservative	Philip Maxwell	585	28.3	▲10.3
Green	Rodrigo Capucho Paulo	147	7.1	▼0.3
Liberal Democrats	Simon Wright	87	4.2	0.0
Majority		659	31.9	▼4.7
Rejected ballots		38	1.8	
Registered electors		7,213		
Turnout		2,101	29.1	▲3.26
Labour hold		Swing		

=== Clifford ward ===
Clifford
Party	Candidate	Votes	%	±%
Labour	Waseem Hassan	2,650	76.2	▼2.9
Green	Jess Mayo	469	13.5	▲0.9
Conservative	James Halliday	254	7.3	▲2.1
Liberal Democrats	Philip Hick	103	2.9	▼0.1
Majority		2,181	62.7	▼3.8
Registered electors		9,053		
Turnout		3,515	38.83	▲2.76
Labour hold		Swing		

=== Davyhulme East ward ===
Davyhulme East
Party	Candidate	Votes	%	±%
Labour	Jill Axford	1,882	51.9	▼10.0
Conservative	Steve Dillon	1,467	40.4	▲18.5
Green	Steven Tennant	172	4.7	▼1.1
Liberal Democrats	James Marshall	107	3.2	▼0.3
Majority		415	11.4	▼27.6
Registered electors		7,703		
Turnout		3,659	47.5	▲6.24
Labour gain from Conservative		Swing		

=== Davyhulme West ward ===
Davyhulme West
Party	Candidate	Votes	%	±%
Labour	Sue Maitland	1,837	53.4	▼0.1
Conservative	Jonathan Coupe	1,378	40.0	▲9.3
Green	Philip Horner	146	4.2	▼0.5
Liberal Democrats	Gerald Zuk	81	2.3	▼0.4
Majority		459	13.3	▼9.9
Registered electors		7,745		
Turnout		3,466	44.8	▲3.18
Labour gain from Conservative		Swing		

=== Flixton ward ===
Flixton (2 vacancies)
Party	Candidate	Votes	%	±%
Labour	Ged Carter	2,202	54.0	
Labour	Dolores Catherine O'Sullivan	1,900	46.6	
Conservative	Susan Ann Taylor	1,293	31.7	
Conservative	Gary Towers	871	21.4	
Green	Katrin Cotter	399	9.8	
Green	Alison Jayne Cavanagh	280	6.9	
Liberal Democrats	Timothy John Kinsella	179	4.4	
Liberal Democrats	Norman Ian Sutherland	110	2.7	
UKIP	Paul James Swansborough	75	1.8	
Majority		909		
Registered electors		8,383		
Turnout		4089	48.8	▲3.3
Labour gain from Conservative		Swing		
Labour hold		Swing		

=== Gorse Hill ward ===
Gorse Hill
Party	Candidate	Votes	%	±%
Labour	Laurence Walsh*	2,114	70.9	▲5.4
Conservative	Ivan Voronov	513	17.2	▲5.3
Green	Sanjai Patel	212	7.1	▼2.5
Liberal Democrats	Dawn Carberry-Power	140	4.7	▼0.2
Majority		1,601	53.7	▲0.3
Registered electors		8,666		
Turnout		3,007	34.7	▲3.48
Labour hold		Swing		

=== Hale Barns ward ===
Hale Barns
Party	Candidate	Votes	%	±%
Conservative	Patrick Myers*	2,008	61.8	▲4.3
Labour Co-op	Barbara Twiney	671	20.67	▲7.17
Green	David Gerard	337	10.3	▲3.4
Liberal Democrats	Simon Lepori	231	7.1	▼4.0
Majority		1,337	25.2	▼17.5
Registered electors		7,362		
Turnout		3,247	43.54	▼5.28
Conservative hold		Swing		

=== Hale Central ward ===
Hale Central
Party	Candidate	Votes	%	±%
Conservative	Daniel Chalkin	1,499	37.7	▼10.8
Green	Jane Leicester	1,307	32.8	▲15.4
Liberal Democrats	Will Frass	737	18.5	▼0.3
Labour	Stephen Little	415	10.4	▼7.0
Majority		192	4.8	▼24.9
Registered electors		7,495		
Turnout		3,978	53.8	▲13.6
Conservative hold		Swing	▼13.1%	

=== Longford ward ===
Longford (2 vacancies)
Party	Candidate	Votes	%	±%
Labour	Sarah Jane Haughey	2,470	63.4	
Labour	Judith Ann Lloyd*	2,072	53.2	
Green	Jennie Patricia Wadsworth	517	13.3	
Green	Margaret Emily Westbrook	435	11.2	
Conservative	Lijo John	433	11.1	
Conservative	Daniel Richard May	409	10.5	
Liberal Democrats	Anna Corrina Fryer	387	9.9	
Liberal Democrats	Mark Michael Campion	210	5.4	
Majority		1953		
Registered electors		9,472		
Turnout		3912	41.31	▲5.7
Labour hold		Swing		

=== Priory ward ===
Priory (2 vacancies)
Party	Candidate	Votes	%	±%
Labour	Barry Brotherton*	2,029	51.4	
Labour	Louise Dagnall	1,981	50.2	
Conservative	Rob Duncan	1,043	26.4	
Conservative	Simon Stonehill	778	19.7	
Green	Nick Robertson-Brown	440	11.1	
Green	Dave Turner	367	9.3	
Liberal Democrats	Briony Stephenson	173	4.4	
Liberal Democrats	David Kierman	166	4.2	
The Democratic Network	Ewen Garrod	42	1.1	
Majority		986		
Majority		1,203		
Rejected ballots		27	0.67	
Registered electors		8,121		
Turnout		3,977	49.0	▲10.39
Labour hold		Swing		
Labour hold		Swing		

=== Sale Moor ward ===
Sale Moor
Party	Candidate	Votes	%	±%
Labour	Mike Freeman*	1,812	56.7	▲4.3
Conservative	Daniel Bell	971	30.4	▲6.5
Green	Stephen Leicester	268	8.4	▼5.4
Liberal Democrats	Marc Ramsbottom	128	4.0	▼3.9
Majority		841	26.3	▼0.3
Registered electors		7,653		
Turnout		3,197	34.03	▼2.37
Labour hold		Swing		

=== St. Mary's ward ===
St Mary's
Party	Candidate	Votes	%	±%
Conservative	John Holden*	1,729	47.5	▼1.6
Labour	James Mills	1,317	36.2	▲6.6
Green	James McGlashan	235	6.5	▼2.9
Women's Equality	Lucy Wood	184	5.9	N/A
Liberal Democrats	Louise Bird	174	4.7	▼1.3
Majority		412	11.3	▼8.2
Registered electors		8,671		
Turnout		3,638	42.0	▲5.85
Conservative hold		Swing		

=== Stretford ward ===
Stretford
Party	Candidate	Votes	%	±%
Labour	Tom Ross*	2,160	66.7	▲0.7
Conservative	Colin Hooley	625	19.3	▲7.5
Green	Liz O'Neill	356	10.9	N/A
Liberal Democrats	Stephen Lee	72	2.2	▼1.6
Majority		1,535	47.4	▼6.8
Rejected ballots		26	0.8	
Registered electors		7,974		
Turnout		3,239	40.6	▲5.0
Labour hold		Swing		

=== Timperley ward ===
Timperley
Party	Candidate	Votes	%	±%
Liberal Democrats	Jane Brophy*	1,762	39.9	▼2.5
Conservative	Stuart Donnelly	1,528	34.6	▲2.1
Labour	Adam Legg	799	18.1	N/A
Green	Jadwiga Leigh	298	2.9	▼8.0
Majority		234	5.3	▼4.6
Registered electors		8,353		
Turnout		4,418	52.9	▲6.6
Liberal Democrats hold		Swing		

=== Urmston ward ===
Urmston
Party	Candidate	Votes	%	±%
Labour Co-op	Cath Hynes*	2,214	58.1	▲3.5
Conservative	Anand Chinthala	1,101	28.8	▲7.4
Green	Luciya Whyte	324	8.5	▼0.1
Liberal Democrats	John Franklin-Johnston	141	3.7	▼1.5
Majority		1,113	29.2	▲4.0
Registered electors		8,496		
Turnout		3,813	44.9	▲4.8
Labour hold		Swing		

=== Village ward ===
Village
Party	Candidate	Votes	%	±%
Conservative	Linda Blackburn	1,293	37.9	▲8.5
Liberal Democrats	Shaun Ennis	1,028	30.2	▼10.8
Labour	Will Jones	901	26.5	▲12.2
Green	Robert Raikes	168	4.9	▼1.2
Majority		265	7.8	▼3.7
Registered electors		7,972		
Turnout		3,405	42.7	▼2.2
Conservative gain from Independent		Swing		
