= Bucklow-St. Martins =

Electoral ward of Trafford, England

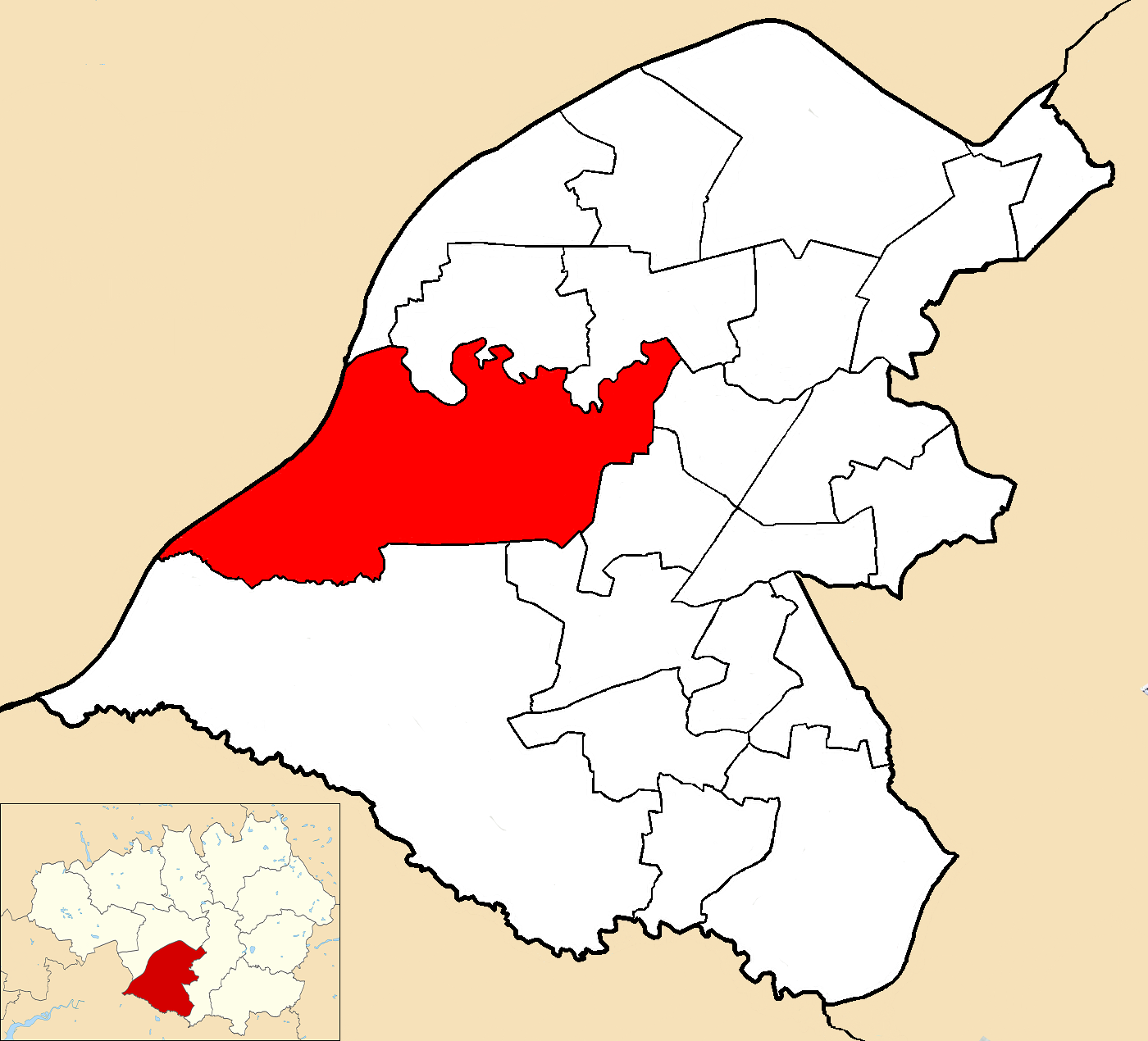
- Bucklow-St. Martins within Trafford
- Population: 10,540
- Metropolitan borough: Trafford
- Metropolitan county: Greater Manchester
- Country: England
- Sovereign state: United Kingdom
- UK Parliament: Stretford and Urmston
- Councillors: Frances Cosby (Labour); Aidan Williams (Labour); James Wright (Labour)

Bucklow-St. Martins is an electoral ward of Trafford covering the town of Partington, the village of Carrington and a small part of Sale.

The ward was created in 2004 from parts of the former Bucklow and St Martins wards.

== Councillors ==
The councillors are Frances Cosby (Labour), Charlotte Waterworth (Reform), and James Wright (Labour).

Election	Councillor	Councillor	Councillor
2004	David Quayle (Lab)	Graham Kanes (Lab)	Ian Platt (Lab)
2006	David Quayle (Lab)	Graham Kanes (Lab)	Ian Platt (Lab)
2007	David Quayle (Lab)	John Smith (Lab)	Ian Platt (Lab)
2008	David Quayle (Lab)	John Smith (Lab)	Ian Platt (Lab)
2010	David Quayle (Lab)	John Smith (Lab)	Ian Platt (Lab)
2011	David Quayle (Lab)	John Smith (Lab)	Ian Platt (Lab)
2012	David Quayle (Lab)	John Smith (Lab)	Ian Platt (Lab)
2014	Karina Carter (Lab)	John Smith (Lab)	Ian Platt (Lab)
May 2015	Karina Carter (Lab)	John Smith (Lab)	Ian Platt (Lab)
Late 2015	Karina Carter (Lab)	John Smith (Lab)	Ian Platt (Independent)
5 May 2016	Karina Carter (Lab)	John Smith (Lab)	James Wright (Lab)
18 May 2016	Karina Carter (Lab)	John Smith (Con)	James Wright (Lab)
2017	Karina Carter (Lab)	Aidan Williams (Lab)	James Wright (Lab)
2018	Adele New (Lab)	Aidan Williams (Lab)	James Wright (Lab)
2019	Adele New (Lab)	Aidan Williams (Lab)	James Wright (Lab)
2021	Adele New (Lab)	Aidan Williams (Lab)	James Wright (Lab)
2022	Adele New (Lab)	Aidan Williams (Lab)	James Wright (Lab)
2023	Adele New (Lab)	Aidan Williams (Lab)	James Wright (Lab)
2 Nov 2023	Frances Cosby (Lab)	Aidan Williams (Lab)	James Wright (Lab)
2024	Frances Cosby (Lab)	Aidan Williams (Lab)	James Wright (Lab)
2026	Frances Cosby (Lab)	Charlotte Waterworth (Ref)	James Wright (Lab)

indicates seat up for re-election. indicates councillor defection. indicates a by-election.

== Elections in the 2020s ==
=== May 2026 ===
2026
Party	Candidate	Votes	%	±%
Reform	Charlotte Waterworth	1,226	43.5	N/A
Labour	Aidan Williams*	618	21.9	−39.6
Green	George Speight	412	14.6	+3.6
Conservative	Itsvan Toth	314	11.1	−9.6
Liberal Democrats	Margaret Boysen	173	6.1	−0.5
Advance UK	Paul Swansborough	69	2.4	N/A
Majority		608	21.6	
Rejected ballots		8	0.3	-2.0
Turnout		2,820	34.7	+9.9
Registered electors		8,135		
Reform gain from Labour		Swing	+41.6	

=== May 2024 ===
2024
Party	Candidate	Votes	%	±%
Labour	James Wright*	1,114	61.5	−5.3
Conservative	Limna Lijo	375	20.7	+1.3
Green	Daniel Wadsworth	129	7.1	−3.0
Liberal Democrats	Matthew Sellars	122	6.6	+1.0
Green	Rodrigo Capucho Paulo	72	3.9	−6.1
Majority		739	39.8	+9.7
Rejected ballots		43		
Turnout		1,855	24.8	+0.3
Registered electors		7,484		
Labour hold		Swing	-3.3	

=== November 2023 (by-election) ===
By-election 2 November 2023
Party	Candidate	Votes	%	±%
Labour	Frances Cosby	794	62.0	▼0.8
Conservative	Paul Lally	284	22.0	▲1.7
Reform	Paul Swansborough	82	6.4	NEW
Green	Rodrigo Capucho Paulo	80	6.2	▼4.2
Liberal Democrats	Matthew Sellars	36	2.8	▼3.5
Majority		510	39.8	
Registered electors		7,325		
Turnout		1,280	17.5	▼7.0
Labour hold		Swing		

=== May 2023 ===
2023 (after boundary changes)
Party	Candidate	Votes	%	±%
Labour	Adele New*	1,163	62.8	
Labour	Aidan Williams*	916		
Labour	James Wright*	872		
Conservative	Eleanor Johnson	336	20.3	
Conservative	John Reilly	315		
Conservative	June Reilly	308		
Green	Wendy Olsen	178	10.4	
Green	Rodrigo Capucho Paulo	158		
Green	Matthew Westbrook	158		
Liberal Democrats	Simon Wright	99	6.3	
Turnout		1,778	24.5	
Labour hold		Swing		
Labour hold		Swing		
Labour hold		Swing		

=== May 2022 ===
2022
Party	Candidate	Votes	%	±%
Labour	Adele New*	1,282	66.0	
Conservative	Gary Towers	443	22.8	
Green	Rodrigo Paulo	111	5.7	
Liberal Democrats	Simon Wright	87	4.5	
Majority		839	43.2	
Registered electors		7,178		
Turnout		1,941	27.0	
Labour hold		Swing		

=== May 2021 ===
2021
Party	Candidate	Votes	%	±%
Labour	James Wright*	1,244	59.2	▲20.8
Conservative	Thomas Maxwell	585	27.8	▲10.8
Green	Rodrigo Capucho Paulo	147	7.0	▲2.5
Liberal Democrats	Simon Wright	87	4.1	▲1.2
Majority		659	31.4	▲16.8
Rejected ballots		38		
Registered electors		7,213		
Turnout		2,101	29.1	▼3.6
Labour hold		Swing	▲5.0	

== Elections in the 2010s ==
=== May 2019 ===
2019
Party	Candidate	Votes	%	±%
Labour	Aidan Williams*	988	54.6	▼15.9
Conservative	Lyall Ainscow	327	18.0	▼3
UKIP	Andrew Beaumont	283	15.6	▲11.2
Green	Rodrigo Capucho Paulo	134	7.4	▲5.2
Liberal Democrats	Stephen Power	76	4.2	▲2.3
Majority		661	36.6	▼13.0
Registered electors		7,060		
Turnout		1,808	25.84	▼2.66
Labour hold		Swing		

=== May 2018 ===
2018
Party	Candidate	Votes	%	±%
Labour	Adele New	1,427	70.5	+5.8
Conservative	Geoffrey Turner	424	21.0	−7.1
UKIP	Norine Napier	90	4.4	+0.4
Green	Rodrigo Capucho Paulo	44	2.2	+0.2
Liberal Democrats	Simon Wright	38	1.9	+0.8
Majority		1,003	49.6	+13.9
Turnout		2,023	28.5	+6.5
Labour hold		Swing		

=== September 2017 (by-election) ===
By-election 14 September 2017
Party	Candidate	Votes	%	±%
Labour	Aidan Williams	1,050	64.7	+26.3
Conservative	Sarah Marland	456	28.1	+11.0
UKIP	Andrew Beaumont	65	4.0	−9.3
Green	Joe Ryan	33	2.0	−2.5
Liberal Democrats	Simon Lepori	18	1.1	−1.8
Majority		594	35.7	+21.1
Turnout		1,662	22.8	−10.7
Labour gain from Conservative		Swing		

=== May 2016 ===
2016
Party	Candidate	Votes	%	±%
Labour	James Wright	835	38.4	−24.5
Independent	Tony Rudden	517	23.7	N/A
Conservative	Geoffrey Turner	371	17.0	−10.9
UKIP	Steve Jones	290	13.3	+13.3
Green	Thea Johnson	98	4.5	−4.7
Liberal Democrats	Graham Rogers	64	2.9	+2.9
Majority		318	14.6	−20.4
Turnout		2,177	32.7	−24.5
Labour hold		Swing		

=== May 2015 ===
2015
Party	Candidate	Votes	%	±%
Labour	John Smith*	2,441	62.9	+9.9
Conservative	Neil Ferguson	1,082	27.9	−3.4
Green	Daniel Wadsworth	357	9.2	−3.7
Majority		1,359	35.0	+5.1
Turnout		3,880	57.2	+25.6
Labour hold		Swing		

NOTE: John Smith defected to the Conservative Party in May 2016.

=== May 2014 ===
2014
Party	Candidate	Votes	%	±%
Labour	Karina Carter	1,054	53	−14.1
Conservative	Stephen Anstee	623	31.3	+10
Green	Daniel Wadsworth	253	12.7	+6.7
Liberal Democrats	Roger Legge	58	2.9	−2.8
Majority		431	21.6	−24.2
Turnout		1,988	29.9	+2.1
Labour hold		Swing		

=== May 2012 ===
2012
Party	Candidate	Votes	%	±%
Labour	Ian Platt*	1,238	67.1	+3.8
Conservative	Lee Peck	393	21.3	−3.2
Green	Daniel Wadsworth	110	6.0	−0.8
Liberal Democrats	Graham Rogers	105	5.7	+0.3
Majority		845	45.8	+6.9
Turnout		1,846	27.8	−3.8
Labour hold		Swing		

=== May 2011 ===
2011
Party	Candidate	Votes	%	±%
Labour	John Smith*	1,432	63.3	+12.1
Conservative	Lee Peck	553	24.5	−2.1
Green	Daniel Wadsworth	153	6.8	+3.8
Liberal Democrats	Graham Rogers	123	5.4	−13.9
Majority		879	38.9	+14.3
Turnout		2,261	31.6	−21.9
Labour hold		Swing		

=== May 2010 ===
2010
Party	Candidate	Votes	%	±%
Labour	David Quayle*	1,972	51.2	+1.1
Conservative	Lisa Cooke	1,025	26.6	−4.3
Liberal Democrats	Graham Rogers	743	19.3	+9.8
Green	Daniel Wadsworth	115	3.0	−6.5
Majority		947	24.6	+5.4
Turnout		3,855	53.5	+26.8
Labour hold		Swing		

== Elections in the 2000s ==
=== May 2008 ===
2008
Party	Candidate	Votes	%	±%
Labour	Ian Platt*	961	50.1	−2.5
Conservative	Anne Hooley	592	30.9	+6.3
Liberal Democrats	Elizabeth Hogg	183	9.5	+9.5
Green	Melanie Bell	182	9.5	+0.9
Majority		369	19.2	−8.8
Turnout		1,918	26.7	−4.7
Labour hold		Swing		

=== May 2007 ===
2007
Party	Candidate	Votes	%	±%
Labour	John Smith	1,106	52.6	−0.9
Conservative	Anne Cavanagh	517	24.6	−6.4
BNP	Andrew Harris	297	14.1	+14.1
Green	William Gradwell	181	8.6	−6.9
Majority		589	28.0	+5.5
Turnout		2,101	31.4	+3.4
Labour hold		Swing		

=== May 2006 ===
2006
Party	Candidate	Votes	%	±%
Labour	David Quayle*	967	53.5	−13.1
Conservative	Anne Cavanagh	560	31.0	−2.4
Green	William Gradwell	280	15.5	+15.5
Majority		407	22.5	−7.4
Turnout		1,807	28.0	−6.7
Labour hold		Swing		

=== May 2004 ===
2004 (after boundary changes)
Party	Candidate	Votes	%	±%
Labour	Ian Platt*	1,406	23.3	
Labour	Graham Kanes*	1,326	22.0	
Labour	David Quayle*	1,287	21.3	
Conservative	Anne Cavanagh	686	11.4	
Conservative	James Davies	685	11.3	
Conservative	Richard Kellett	647	10.7	
Turnout		6,037	34.7	
Labour win (new seat)				
Labour win (new seat)				
Labour win (new seat)				
