= 2012 Tameside Metropolitan Borough Council election =

2012 UK local government election

Results of the 2012 Tameside Metropolitan Borough Council election

The 2012 Tameside Council election took place on 3 May 2012 to elect members of Tameside Metropolitan Borough Council in England. This was on the same day as other 2012 United Kingdom local elections.

One third of the council was up for election, with councillors elected in 2008 Tameside Council election defending their seats with vote share changes calculated on that basis.

== Ward results ==
An asterisk denotes an incumbent.

=== Ashton Hurst ward ===
Ashton Hurst
Party	Candidate	Votes	%	±%
Labour	Leigh Drennan	1,449	49.14	+15.74
Conservative	Richard Ambler*	1,039	35.23	−21.51
UKIP	Lisa Radcliffe	274	9.29	−0.57
Green	Nigel Rolland	187	6.34	N/A
Majority		410	13.90	
Turnout		2,959	33.6	−4.5
Labour gain from Conservative		Swing		

=== Ashton St. Michael's ward ===
Ashton St. Michael's
Party	Candidate	Votes	%	±%
Labour	Margaret Sidebottom	1,475	59.79	+21.76
Conservative	Paul Buckley	551	22.33	−15.44
English Democrat	David Timpson	283	11.47	N/A
Green	Rochelle Rolland	158	6.40	+0.78
Majority		924	37.45	
Turnout		2,472	28.5	+0.4
Labour hold		Swing		

=== Ashton Waterloo ward ===
Ashton Waterloo
Party	Candidate	Votes	%	±%
Labour	Catherine Piddington*	1,703	65.5	+24.98
Conservative	Lee Price	442	17	−13.39
UKIP	Peter Taylor	257	9.88	N/A
Green	Andrew Threlfall	198	7.62	+3.25
Majority		1,261	48.5	
Turnout		2,613	30	−4
Labour hold		Swing		

=== Audenshaw ward ===
Audenshaw
Party	Candidate	Votes	%	±%
Labour	Teresa Smith	1,530	58.78	+17.78
Conservative	Gaynor Paterson	440	16.90	−15.24
UKIP	Tracy Radcliffe	416	15.98	N/A
Green	Stuart Bennett	217	8.34	N/A
Majority		1,090	41.87	
Turnout		2,612	29.4	−7.5
Labour hold		Swing		

=== Denton North East ward ===
Denton North East
Party	Candidate	Votes	%	±%
Labour	Denise Ward	1,601	63.63	+18.18
Conservative	Rachel Marshall	397	15.78	−20.61
UKIP	Joanna Herod	339	13.47	N/A
Green	Stephen Boyd	179	7.11	N/A
Majority		1,204	47.85	
Turnout		2,521	29.5	−0.7
Labour hold		Swing		

=== Denton South ward ===
Denton South
Party	Candidate	Votes	%	±%
Labour	Margaret Downs*	1,369	51.20	−6.33
Independent	Carl Simmons	675	25.24	N/A
UKIP	Adrienne Bennett	302	11.29	N/A
Conservative	Stephen Roden	250	9.35	−33.12
Green	Noel Woodhead	78	2.92	N/A
Majority		694	25.95	
Turnout		2,682	31.8	+2.2
Labour hold		Swing		

=== Denton West ward ===
Denton West
Party	Candidate	Votes	%	±%
Labour	Dawson Lane*	2,052	65.90	+15.69
Conservative	Christine Marshall	563	18.08	−31.71
UKIP	Michelle Harrison	359	11.53	N/A
Green	Simon Rollinson	140	4.50	N/A
Majority		1,489	47.82	
Turnout		3,133	34	−0.6
Labour hold		Swing		

=== Droylsden East ward ===
Droylsden East
Party	Candidate	Votes	%	±%
Labour	Jim Middleton*	1,640	61.49	+15.42
UKIP	Ted Salmon	480	18.00	N/A
BNP	Robert Booth	236	8.85	−23.87
Conservative	Matt Holgate	221	8.29	−12.92
Green	Mark Stanley	90	3.37	N/A
Majority		1,160	43.49	
Turnout		2,681	30.4	−5.1
Labour hold		Swing		

=== Droylsden West ward ===
Droylsden West
Party	Candidate	Votes	%	±%
Labour	Gerald Cooney*	2,028	75.33	+16.76
UKIP	George Mills	305	11.33	N/A
Conservative	Dot Buckley	214	7.95	−13.68
Green	Jennifer Ball	145	5.39	N/A
Majority		1,723	64.00	
Turnout		2,700	30.2	−4.4
Labour hold		Swing		

=== Dukinfield ward ===
In 2008, Roy West stood in this ward as a British National Party candidate.

Dukinfield
Party	Candidate	Votes	%	±%
Labour	Brian Wild*	1,553	59.14	+14.44
Independent	Roy West	325	12.38	−13.54
Conservative	Brenda Roden	304	11.58	−8.97
UKIP	John Cooke	248	9.44	N/A
Green	Dylan Lancaster	196	7.46	N/A
Majority		1,249	47.56	
Turnout		2,634	28	−3.7
Labour hold		Swing		

=== Dukinfield / Stalybridge ward ===
The previous councillor for Dukinfield / Stalybridge, Dorothy Cartwright, defected from the Conservative Party to the Labour Party in December 2010.

Dukinfield / Stalybridge
Party	Candidate	Votes	%	±%
Labour	Claire Reynolds	1,528	55.75	+20.65
Conservative	Amanda Buckley	483	17.62	−26.61
English Democrat	Gregory Shorrock	364	13.28	N/A
UKIP	Lyn Misell	211	7.70	N/A
Green	Michael Fowler	155	5.65	−2.45
Majority		1,045	38.12	
Turnout		2,748	31.4	−2.6
Labour hold		Swing		

=== Hyde Godley ward ===
Hyde Godley
Party	Candidate	Votes	%	±%
Labour	Joe Kitchen*	1,582	65.29	+22.98
Conservative	Tom Welsby	383	15.81	−14.42
UKIP	Duran O'Dwyer	318	13.12	+8.63
Green	Melanie Roberts	140	5.78	N/A
Majority		1,199	49.84	
Turnout		2,437	28.9	−2.3
Labour hold		Swing		

=== Hyde Newton ward ===
Hyde Newton
Party	Candidate	Votes	%	±%
Labour Co-op	Peter Robinson*	1,779	60.84	+24.32
Conservative	Craig Halliday	429	14.67	−9.11
UKIP	Ian Horton	301	10.29	N/A
BNP	Rosalind Gauchi	241	8.24	−19.24
Green	Jacintha Manchester	174	5.95	N/A
Majority		1,350	46.17	
Turnout		2,928	29.5	−3.8
Labour Co-op hold		Swing		

=== Hyde Werneth ward ===
Hyde Werneth
Party	Candidate	Votes	%	±%
Labour	Raja Miah	1,923	49.79	+14.41
Conservative	Floyd Paterson	1,470	38.06	−13.98
UKIP	Stephanie Misell	243	6.29	−1.11
Green	June Gill	226	5.85	+0.68
Majority		453	11.73	
Turnout		3,870	44	+3
Labour gain from Conservative		Swing		

=== Longdendale ward ===
Longdendale
Party	Candidate	Votes	%	±%
Labour	Adam White*	1,407	53.76	+8.20
Conservative	Rob Adlard	731	27.93	−8.67
Green	Damian Mendes-Kelly	250	9.55	−1.25
UKIP	Kevin Misell	229	8.75	+1.72
Majority		676	25.83	
Turnout		2,630	33.7	−3.9
Labour hold		Swing		

=== Mossley ward ===
Mossley
Party	Candidate	Votes	%	±%
Labour Co-op	Ellie Shember-Critchley	1,258	45.73	+7.73
Independent	Dean Aylett	906	32.93	N/A
Conservative	Dominic Johnson	311	11.30	−10.96
Green	Christine Clark	276	10.03	+0.81
Majority		352	12.80	
Turnout		2,758	32.1	−4.9
Labour Co-op gain from Independent		Swing		

=== St Peter's ward ===
St Peter's
Party	Candidate	Votes	%	±%
Labour	Warren Bray*	1,990	77.01	+24.50
Green	Trevor Clarke	339	13.12	+2.28
Conservative	James Flynn	255	9.87	−13.79
Majority		1,651	63.89	
Turnout		2,600	28.8	+0.8
Labour hold		Swing		

=== Stalybridge North ward ===
Stalybridge North
Party	Candidate	Votes	%	±%
Labour Co-op	Jan Jackson	1,364	51.14	+10.06
Conservative	Clive Patrick	833	31.23	−11.47
English Democrat	Andrew Fogg	188	7.05	N/A
Green	Jean Smee	169	6.34	−2.87
UKIP	Emma Misell	113	4.24	−2.76
Majority		531	19.91	
Turnout		2,676	28.5	−1.2
Labour Co-op gain from Conservative		Swing		

=== Stalybridge South ward ===
Stalybridge South
Party	Candidate	Votes	%	±%
Conservative	Doreen Dickinson*	1,368	51.76	−12.06
Labour	Dorothy Cartwright	935	35.38	+13.90
Green	John Spiller	179	6.77	−1.05
UKIP	Angela McManus	161	6.09	−0.79
Majority		433	16.38	
Turnout		2,656	31.1	−2.4
Conservative hold		Swing		
