= 2007 Tameside Metropolitan Borough Council election =

2007 UK local government election

Results of the 2007 Tameside Metropolitan Borough Council election

Elections to Tameside Council were held on 4 May 2007. One third of the council was up for election, with each successful candidate to serve a four-year term of office, expiring in 2011. The Labour Party retained overall control of the council.

After the election, the composition of the council was

- Labour 45
- Conservative 8
- Liberal Democrats Audenshaw Focus Team 1
- Others 3

== Election result ==
Tameside local election result 2007
Party	Seats	Gains	Losses	Net gain/loss	Seats %	Votes %	Votes	+/−
Labour	15	1	0	+1	78.9	44.7	24,054	
Conservative	2	0	0	0	10.5	28.1	15,126	
Labour Co-op	1	0	0	0	5.3	2.8	1,500	
Independent	1	0	0	0	5.3	2.4	1,267	
BNP	0	0	0	0	0	7.2	3,896	
Liberal Democrats	0	0	1	-1	0	5.2	2,797	
Green	0	0	0	0	0	4.9	2,633	
UKIP	0	0	0	0	0	2.1	1,128	

== Ward results ==
=== Ashton Hurst ward ===
Ashton Hurst
Party	Candidate	Votes	%	±%
Labour	Alan Whitehead	1,337	39.8	
Conservative	Kate Scott	1,323	39.4	
BNP	Bev Jones	267	8.0	
Liberal Democrats	Cerudwen Elizabeth Lawe	219	6.5	
Green	Nigel Rolland	124	3.7	
UKIP	Paul Littlewood	86	2.6	
Majority		14	0.4	
Turnout		3,356	38.0	
Labour hold		Swing		

=== Ashton St. Michael's ward ===
Ashton St. Michael's
Party	Candidate	Votes	%	±%
Labour	Bill Harrison	993	42.4	
Conservative	Joseph Peter Schofield	773	33.0	
Liberal Democrats	Paul Stephen Daly	252	10.8	
Green	Elizabeth Blyth	175	7.5	
UKIP	Richard Harrison	150	6.4	
Majority		220	9.4	
Turnout		2,343	28.8	
Labour hold		Swing		

=== Ashton Waterloo ward ===
Ashton Waterloo
Party	Candidate	Votes	%	±%
Labour	Mike Whiteley	1,238	42.8	
Conservative	Gareth Quinn	723	25.0	
BNP	David Jones	509	17.6	
Liberal Democrats	John Bartley	257	8.9	
Green	Andrew David Threlfall	163	5.6	
Majority		515	17.8	
Turnout		2,890	35.4	
Labour hold		Swing		

=== Audenshaw ward ===
Audenshaw
Party	Candidate	Votes	%	±%
Labour	Wendy Brelsford	1,286	47.9	
Conservative	Elizabeth Dawn Charlesworth	899	33.5	
Liberal Democrats	Allison Kay Seabourne	502	18.7	
Majority		387	14.4	
Turnout		2,687	31.6	
Labour hold		Swing		

=== Denton North East ward ===
Denton North East
Party	Candidate	Votes	%	±%
Labour	Allison Gwynne	1,395	55.1	
Conservative	Georgina Helena Greenwood	719	28.4	
Liberal Democrats	Shaun O’Rourke	419	16.5	
Majority		676	26.7	
Turnout		2,533	30.6	
Labour hold		Swing		

=== Denton South ward ===
Denton South
Party	Candidate	Votes	%	±%
Labour	Andrew Doubleday	1,427	57.5	
Conservative	Thomas Meredith Jones	672	27.1	
BNP	David Lomas	384	15.5	
Majority		755	30.4	
Turnout		2,483	29.7	
Labour hold		Swing		

=== Denton West ward ===
Denton West
Party	Candidate	Votes	%	±%
Labour	Brenda Warrington	1,888	60.8	
Conservative	Joan Mary Howarth	1,217	39.2	
Majority		671	21.6	
Turnout		3,105	34.4	
Labour hold		Swing		

=== Droylsden East ward ===
Droylsden East
Party	Candidate	Votes	%	±%
Labour Co-op	Kieran Quinn	1,582	53.7	
BNP	David Gough	665	22.6	
Conservative	Emlyn Richard Davis	411	14.0	
Liberal Democrats	Ian Dunlop	287	9.7	
Majority		917	31.1	
Turnout		2,945	35.0	
Labour Co-op hold		Swing		

=== Droylsden West ward ===
Droylsden West
Party	Candidate	Votes	%	±%
Labour	Ann Holland	1,977	66.4	
BNP	Paul Hindley	546	18.3	
Conservative	Charles Bryan Fletcher	456	15.3	
Majority		1,431	48.1	
Turnout		2,945	35.0	
Labour hold		Swing		

=== Dukinfield ward ===
Dukinfield
Party	Candidate	Votes	%	±%
Labour	John Charles Taylor	1,364	50.9	
BNP	Roy Kevin West	520	19.4	
Conservative	Stacey Frances Knighton	455	17.0	
Green	Martine Marshall	340	12.7	
Majority		844	31.5	
Turnout		2,679	30.9	
Labour hold		Swing		

=== Dukinfield / Stalybridge ward ===
Dukinfield / Stalybridge
Party	Candidate	Votes	%	±%
Labour	David Jonathon Sweeton	1,299	44.9	
Conservative	Brian Eric Dean	1,039	35.9	
UKIP	Paul Kidd	283	9.8	
Green	Michael Smee	272	9.4	
Majority		260	9.0	
Turnout		2,893	34.3	
Labour hold		Swing		

=== Hyde Godley ward ===
Hyde Godley
Party	Candidate	Votes	%	±%
Labour	John Bernard Sullivan	1,414	68.2	
Conservative	Ali Reza	658	31.8	
Majority		756	36.4	
Turnout		2,072	26.5	
Labour hold		Swing		

=== Hyde Newton ward ===
Hyde Newton
Party	Candidate	Votes	%	±%
Labour Co-op	Helen Theresa Bowden	1,252	42.0	
BNP	Nigel Christian Byrne	719	24.1	
Conservative	Thomas David Welsby	544	18.2	
Liberal Democrats	Peter Stanley Ball-Foster	329	11.0	
Green	Michelle Valentine	137	4.6	
Majority		533	17.9	
Turnout		2,981	33.0	
Labour Co-op hold		Swing		

=== Hyde Werneth ward ===
Hyde Werneth
Party	Candidate	Votes	%	±%
Conservative	John Stuart Bell	1,735	49.0	
Labour	Raja Miah	1,285	36.3	
BNP	Rosalind Gauci	286	8.1	
UKIP	John Cooke	235	6.6	
Majority		450	12.7	
Turnout		3,541	42.1	
Conservative hold		Swing		

=== Longdendale ward ===
Longdendale
Party	Candidate	Votes	%	±%
Labour Co-op	Jonathan Neil Reynolds	1,500	54.3	
Conservative	Dorothy Cartwright	783	28.3	
Green	Melanie Roberts	250	9.0	
UKIP	Kevin Misell	231	8.4	
Majority		717	26.0	
Turnout		2,764	37.0	
Labour Co-op hold		Swing		

=== Mossley ward ===
Mossley
Party	Candidate	Votes	%	±%
Independent	Valerie Carter	1,267	45.6	
Labour Co-op	Idu Miah	1,036	37.3	
Green	Christine Anne Clark	475	17.1	
Majority		231	8.3	
Turnout		2,778	35.9	
Independent hold		Swing		

=== St Peter's ward ===
St Peter's
Party	Candidate	Votes	%	±%
Labour	Jack Davis	1,349	59.8	
Liberal Democrats	John Michael Piper	532	23.6	
Conservative	David Afshar	374	16.6	
Majority		817	36.2	
Turnout		2,255	27.4	
Labour hold		Swing		

=== Stalybridge North ward ===
Stalybridge North
Party	Candidate	Votes	%	±%
Labour Co-op	George Roberts	1,190	46.9	
Conservative	Clive Alistair Patrick	920	36.3	
Green	Jean Margaret Smee	426	16.8	
Majority		270	10.6	
Turnout		2,536	28.0	
Labour Co-op hold		Swing		

=== Stalybridge South ward ===
Stalybridge South
Party	Candidate	Votes	%	±%
Conservative	David Eric Buckley	1,425	55.2	
Labour	Eleanor Ballagher	742	28.7	
Green	Jacintha Muriel Manchester	271	10.5	
UKIP	Angela McManus	143	5.5	
Majority		683	26.5	
Turnout		2,581	31.6	
Conservative hold		Swing		
