= 2015 Tameside Metropolitan Borough Council election =

2015 local election in England

Results of the 2015 Tameside Metropolitan Borough Council election

The 2015 Tameside Metropolitan Borough Council election took place on 7 May 2015 to elect members of Tameside Metropolitan Borough Council in England. This was on the same day as other local elections.

== Ward results ==
=== Ashton Hurst ward ===
Ashton Hurst
Party	Candidate	Votes	%	±%
Labour	Mike Glover	2,548	49.19	
Conservative	Liam Billington	2,077	40.10	
Green	Charlotte Hughes	555	10.71	
Majority		471	9.09	
Turnout		5,180	58	
Labour hold		Swing		

=== Ashton St. Michael's ward ===
Ashton St. Michael's
Party	Candidate	Votes	%	±%
Labour	Yvonne Cartey	2,621	57.95	
Conservative	Christine Liley	1,283	28.37	
Green	Nigel Rolland	619	13.69	
Majority		1,338	29.58	
Turnout		4,523	52	
Labour hold		Swing		

=== Ashton Waterloo ward ===
Ashton Waterloo
Party	Candidate	Votes	%	±%
Labour	Lorraine Whitehead	2,382	48.03	
Conservative	Sam Daniels	1,240	25.01	
UKIP	Peter Howarth	1,063	21.44	
Green	Andrew Threlfall	274	5.53	
Majority		1,142	23.03	
Turnout		4,959	57	
Labour hold		Swing		

=== Audenshaw ward ===
Audenshaw
Party	Candidate	Votes	%	±%
Labour	Maria Bailey	2,832	52.15	
UKIP	Maurice Jackson	1,988	36.61	
Green	Mark Stanley	526	9.69	
Communist	Paul Ward	84	1.55	
Majority		844	15.54	
Turnout		5,430	60	
Labour hold		Swing		

=== Denton North East ward ===
Denton North East
Party	Candidate	Votes	%	±%
Labour	Allison Gwynne	2,560	51.81	
UKIP	Dennis Connor	1,219	24.67	
Conservative	Carol White	918	18.58	
Green	Gerard Boyd	244	4.94	
Majority		1,341	27.14	
Turnout		4,941	57	
Labour hold		Swing		

=== Denton South ward ===
Denton South
Party	Candidate	Votes	%	±%
Labour	Mike Fowler	2,092	43.59	
Independent	Carl Simmons	1,152	24.01	
UKIP	Adrienne Shaw	719	14.98	
Conservative	Zoe Gallacher	654	13.63	
Green	Mark Stanfield	132	2.75	
TUSC	Dean Kavanagh	50	1.04	
Majority		940	19.59	
Turnout		4,799	57	
Labour hold		Swing		

=== Denton West ward ===
Denton West
Party	Candidate	Votes	%	±%
Labour	Brenda Warrington	3,369	56.98	
Conservative	Thomas Dunne	1,843	31.17	
Green	Gareth Hayes	488	8.25	
TUSC	Robert Heap	213	3.60	
Majority		1,526	25.81	
Turnout		5,913	62	
Labour hold		Swing		

=== Droylsden East ward ===
Councillor Kieran Quinn died on Christmas Day 2017.

Droylsden East
Party	Candidate	Votes	%	±%
Labour Co-op	Kieran Quinn	2,826	54.12	
UKIP	Peter Harris	1,698	32.52	
Green	John McCarthy	399	7.64	
Independent	Sarah Delaney	299	5.73	
Majority		1,128	21.60	
Turnout		5,222	58	
Labour Co-op hold		Swing		

=== Droylsden West ward ===
Droylsden West
Party	Candidate	Votes	%	±%
Labour	Ann Holland	2,881	54.39	
UKIP	Max Bennett	1,338	25.26	
Conservative	Gill Westhead	766	14.46	
Green	Andrew Climance	312	5.89	
Majority		1,543	29.13	
Turnout		5,297	58	
Labour hold		Swing		

=== Dukinfield ward ===
Dukinfield
Party	Candidate	Votes	%	±%
Labour	John Taylor	2,416	48.98	
UKIP	John Cooke	1,204	24.41	
Conservative	David Liley	961	19.48	
Green	Julie Wood	352	7.14	
Majority		1,212	24.57	
Turnout		4,933	52	
Labour hold		Swing		

=== Dukinfield / Stalybridge ward ===
Dukinfield / Stalybridge
Party	Candidate	Votes	%	±%
Labour	David Sweeton	2,720	54.50	
UKIP	Wayne Jones	1,821	36.49	
Green	Mo Ramzan	450	9.02	
Majority		899	18.01	
Turnout		4,991	58	
Labour hold		Swing		

=== Hyde Godley ward ===
Hyde Godley
Party	Candidate	Votes	%	±%
Labour	Betty Affleck	2,194	47.75	
UKIP	Gail Jones	1,256	27.33	
Conservative	Mohammed Iqbal	790	17.19	
Green	Nick Koopman	297	6.46	
TUSC	Peter Jones	58	1.26	
Majority		938	20.41	
Turnout		4,595	53	
Labour hold		Swing		

=== Hyde Newton ward ===
Hyde Newton
Party	Candidate	Votes	%	±%
Labour Co-op	Helen Bowden	2,816	51.54	
UKIP	Philip Chadwick	1,993	36.48	
Green	Andrew Highton	655	11.99	
Majority		823	15.06	
Turnout		5,464	54	
Labour Co-op hold		Swing		

=== Hyde Werneth ward ===
Hyde Werneth
Party	Candidate	Votes	%	±%
Conservative	John Bell	2,754	49.28	
Labour	Debbie Boulton	2,422	43.34	
Green	Jean Smee	412	7.37	
Majority		332	5.94	
Turnout		5,588	64	
Conservative hold		Swing		

=== Longdendale ward ===
Longdendale
Party	Candidate	Votes	%	±%
Labour Co-op	Gillian Peet	2,228	48.58	
Conservative	David Tyler	1,741	37.96	
Green	Brierley Irene	617	13.45	
Majority		487	10.62	
Turnout		4,586	58	
Labour Co-op hold		Swing		

=== Mossley ward ===
Idu Miah resigned after ten months in office, his seat was retained for Labour by Tafheen Sharif at the 2016 local elections.

Mossley
Party	Candidate	Votes	%	±%
Labour Co-op	Idu Miah	2,251	43.03	
Independent	Dean Aylett	1,162	22.21	
Conservative	Dominic Johnson	1,042	19.92	
Green	Christine Clark	544	10.40	
Liberal Democrats	Martin Kiely	232	4.44	
Majority		1,089	20.82	
Turnout		5,231	60	
Labour Co-op hold		Swing		

=== St Peter's ward ===
St Peter's
Party	Candidate	Votes	%	±%
Labour	Dave McNally	2,943	62.79	
UKIP	Raymond Dunning	732	15.62	
Conservative	Laura Martin	611	13.04	
Green	Trevor Clarke	328	7.00	
TUSC	Deej Johnson	73	1.56	
Majority		2,211	47.17	
Turnout		4,687	50	
Labour hold		Swing		

=== Stalybridge North ward ===
Stalybridge North
Party	Candidate	Votes	%	±%
Labour	Adrian Pearce	2,258	43.31	
Conservative	Colin White	1,466	28.12	
UKIP	Angela McManus	1,090	20.91	
Green	Dave Bradbury	399	7.65	
Majority		792	15.19	
Turnout		5,213	54	
Labour hold		Swing		

=== Stalybridge South ward ===
Stalybridge South
Party	Candidate	Votes	%	±%
Conservative	Clive Patrick	2,627	51.86	
Labour	Dorothy Cartwright	1,842	36.36	
Green	Paul White	597	11.78	
Majority		785	15.50	
Turnout		5,066	59	
Conservative hold		Swing		
