= Hyde Godley =

Hyde Godley (Tameside)
- Electoral ward
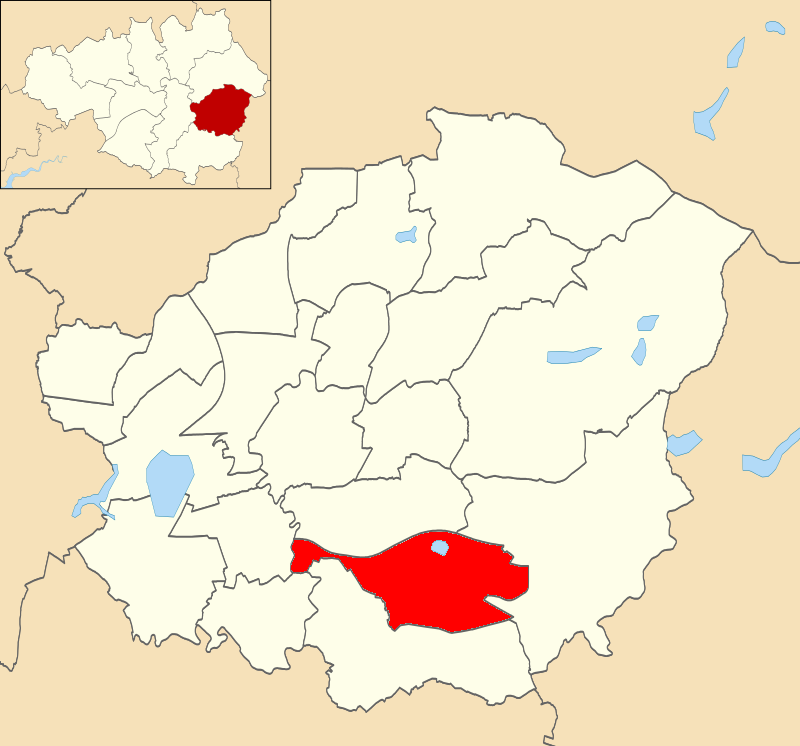
- Hyde Godley within Tameside

- Coat of arms
- Motto: Industry and Integrity
- Interactive map of Hyde Godley (Tameside)
- Coordinates: 53.4490°N 2.0557°W
- Country: United Kingdom
- Constituent country: England
- Region: North West England
- County: Greater Manchester
- Metropolitan borough: Tameside
- Created: 2004
- Named after: Stalybridge and Hyde

Government UK Parliament constituency: Stalybridge and Hyde
  - Type: Unicameral
  - Body: Tameside Metropolitan Borough Council
  - Leader of the Council: Brenda Warrington (Labour)
  - Councillor: Jim Fitzpatrick (Labour Co-operative)
  - Councillor: Betty Affleck (Labour)
  - Councillor: Joe Kitchen (Labour)

Hyde Godley is an electoral ward of Tameside, England. It is represented in Westminster by Jonathan Reynolds Labour Co-operative MP for Stalybridge and Hyde.

== Councillors ==
The ward is represented by three councillors: Jim Fitzpatrick (Lab Co-op), Betty Affleck (Lab), and Joe Kitchen (Lab).

Election	Councillor	Councillor	Councillor
2004	Jim Fitzpatrick (Lab Co-op)	John Sullivan (Lab)	Joe Kitchen (Lab)
2006	Jim Fitzpatrick (Lab Co-op)	John Sullivan (Lab)	Joe Kitchen (Lab)
2007	Jim Fitzpatrick (Lab Co-op)	John Sullivan (Lab)	Joe Kitchen (Lab)
2008	Jim Fitzpatrick (Lab Co-op)	John Sullivan (Lab)	Joe Kitchen (Lab)
2010	Jim Fitzpatrick (Lab Co-op)	John Sullivan (Lab)	Joe Kitchen (Lab)
2011	Jim Fitzpatrick (Lab Co-op)	John Sullivan (Lab)	Joe Kitchen (Lab)
2012	Jim Fitzpatrick (Lab Co-op)	John Sullivan (Lab)	Joe Kitchen (Lab)
2014	Jim Fitzpatrick (Lab Co-op)	John Sullivan (Lab)	Joe Kitchen (Lab)
2015	Jim Fitzpatrick (Lab Co-op)	Betty Affleck (Lab)	Joe Kitchen (Lab)
2016	Jim Fitzpatrick (Lab Co-op)	Betty Affleck (Lab)	Joe Kitchen (Lab)
2018	Jim Fitzpatrick (Lab Co-op)	Betty Affleck (Lab)	Joe Kitchen (Lab)

indicates seat up for re-election.

== Elections in 2010s ==
=== May 2018 ===
2018
Party	Candidate	Votes	%	±%
Labour	Jim Fitzpatrick*	1,254		
Conservative	Andrea Colbourne	901		
Green	Philip King	198		
Turnout		2,360	26	
Labour hold		Swing		

=== May 2016 ===
2016
Party	Candidate	Votes	%	±%
Labour	Joe Kitchen	1,440	54.38	
UKIP	Andrea Colbourne	842	31.80	
Conservative	Forhad Jani	366	13.82	
Majority		598	22.58	
Turnout		2,648	31	
Labour hold		Swing		

=== May 2015 ===
2015
Party	Candidate	Votes	%	±%
Labour	Betty Affleck	2,194	47.75	
UKIP	Gail Jones	1,256	27.33	
Conservative	Mohammed Iqbal	790	17.19	
Green	Nick Koopman	297	6.46	
TUSC	Peter Jones	58	1.26	
Majority		938	20.41	
Turnout		4,595	53	
Labour hold		Swing		

=== May 2014 ===
2014
Party	Candidate	Votes	%	±%
Labour Co-op	Jim Fitzpatrick	1,597	62.16	
Conservative	Mohammed Iqbal	493	19.19	
Green	Nicholas Koopman	479	18.65	
Majority		1,104	42.97	
Turnout		2,569	30	
Labour Co-op hold		Swing		

=== May 2012 ===
2012
Party	Candidate	Votes	%	±%
Labour	Joe Kitchen	1,582	65.29	+22.98
Conservative	Tom Welsby	383	15.81	−14.42
UKIP	Duran O'Dwyer	318	13.12	+8.63
Green	Melanie Roberts	140	5.78	N/A
Majority		1,199	49.84	
Turnout		2,437	28.9	−2.3
Labour hold		Swing		

=== May 2011 ===
2011
Party	Candidate	Votes	%	±%
Labour	John Sullivan	1,779	64.15	
Conservative	Thomas Welsby	636	22.15	
UKIP	Duran O'Dwyer	358	12.91	
Majority		1,143	41.22	
Turnout		2,773	33	
Labour hold		Swing		

=== May 2010 ===
2010
Party	Candidate	Votes	%	±%
Labour Co-op	Jim Fitzpatrick	2,310	51.21	
Conservative	Thomas Welsby	1,279	28.35	
BNP	Robert Booth	424	9.40	
UKIP	Duran O'Dwyer	267	5.92	
Green	Glennis Sharpe	231	5.12	
Majority		1,031	22.86	
Turnout		4,511	55	
Labour Co-op hold		Swing		

== Elections in 2000s ==
=== May 2008 ===
2008
Party	Candidate	Votes	%	±%
Labour	Joe Kitchen	1,026	42.31	
Conservative	Thomas Welsby	733	30.23	
BNP	Rosalind Gauci	293	12.08	
Liberal Democrats	Jennifer Ball-Foster	264	10.89	
UKIP	Duran O'Dwyer	109	4.49	
Majority		293	12.08	
Turnout		2,425	30	
Labour hold		Swing		

=== May 2007 ===
2007
Party	Candidate	Votes	%	±%
Labour	John Bernard Sullivan	1,414	68.2	
Conservative	Ali Reza	658	31.8	
Majority		756	36.5	
Turnout		2,072	26.5	
Labour hold		Swing		

=== May 2006 ===
2006
Party	Candidate	Votes	%	±%
Labour Co-op	James Fitzpatrick	1,322	50.62	
Conservative	Ali Reza	673	49.38	
Majority		31	1.23	
Turnout		2,511	26	
Labour Co-op hold		Swing		

=== June 2004 ===
2004
Party	Candidate	Votes	%	±%
Labour	Joseph Kitchen	1,334	45.9	
Labour	John Sullivan	1,257		
Labour Co-op	James Fitzpatrick	1,254		
Conservative	James Walton	897	30.8	
Conservative	John Holt	831		
Conservative	Ali Reza	686		
Liberal Democrats	James Arathoon	678	23.3	
Majority				
Turnout			34.4	
