= 2010 Tameside Metropolitan Borough Council election =

2010 local election in England

Results of the 2010 Tameside Metropolitan Borough Council election

Elections to Tameside Metropolitan Borough Council were held on 6 May 2010. One- third of the council was up for election, with each successful candidate to serve a four-year term of office, expiring in 2014. The Labour Party retained overall control of the council.

== Ward Results ==
=== Ashton Hurst ward ===
Ashton Hurst
Party	Candidate	Votes	%	±%
Labour	Pauline Harrison	2,396	46.08	
Conservative	John Kelly	1,930	37.12	
BNP	Karen Lomas	400	7.69	
UKIP	Peter Taylor	241	4.63	
Green	Nigel Rolland	233	4.48	
Majority		466	8.96	
Turnout		5,200	59	
Labour gain from Conservative		Swing		

=== Ashton St. Michael's ward ===
Ashton St. Michael's
Party	Candidate	Votes	%	±%
Labour	Bill Fairfoull	2,284	50.12	
Conservative	Paul Buckley	1,562	34.28	
UKIP	Andrew Gee	416	9.13	
Green	Rochelle Rolland	295	6.47	
Majority		722	15.84	
Turnout		4,557	54	
Labour hold		Swing		

=== Ashton Waterloo ward ===
Ashton Waterloo
Party	Candidate	Votes	%	±%
Labour Co-op	Lynn Travis	2,583	52.68	
Conservative	Stacey Knighton	1,377	28.08	
BNP	David Gough	526	10.73	
UKIP	Colette Barlow	417	8.50	
Majority		1,206	24.60	
Turnout		4,903	59	
Labour Co-op hold		Swing		

=== Audenshaw ward ===
Audenshaw
Party	Candidate	Votes	%	±%
Labour	Colin White	2,714	51.68	
Conservative	Sharon Knighton	1,710	32.56	
BNP	Anthony Jones	828	15.77	
Majority		1,004	19.12	
Turnout		5,252	62	
Labour hold		Swing		

=== Denton North East ward ===
Denton North East
Party	Candidate	Votes	%	±%
Labour	Vincent Ricci	2,656	53.07	
Conservative	David Southward	1,336	26.69	
BNP	Rosalind Gauci	434	8.67	
UKIP	Michelle Harrison	334	6.67	
Green	Gerard Boyd	245	4.90	
Majority		1,320	26.37	
Turnout		5,005	60	
Labour hold		Swing		

=== Denton South ward ===
Denton South
Party	Candidate	Votes	%	±%
Labour	Claire Francis	2,671	56.73	
Conservative	Steve Roden	1,476	31.35	
BNP	Stephen Taylor	561	11.92	
Majority		1,195	25.38	
Turnout		4,708	57	
Labour hold		Swing		

=== Denton West ward ===
Denton West
Party	Candidate	Votes	%	±%
Labour	Michael Smith	3,301	56.49	
Conservative	Floyd Paterson	1,758	30.09	
BNP	Stephen Booth	431	7.38	
Green	Geoffrey Howard	353	6.04	
Majority		1,543	26.41	
Turnout		5,843	64	
Labour hold		Swing		

=== Droylsden East ward ===
Droylsden East
Party	Candidate	Votes	%	±%
Labour Co-op	Susan Quinn	2,761	51.46	
BNP	David Lomas	840	15.66	
Conservative	Lee Robinson	824	15.36	
Liberal Democrats	Charles Turner	671	12.51	
UKIP	Ted Salmon	269	5.01	
Majority		1,921	35.81	
Turnout		5,365	62	
Labour Co-op hold		Swing		

=== Droylsden West ward ===
Droylsden West
Party	Candidate	Votes	%	±%
Labour	Barrie Holland	3,174	59.84	
Conservative	David Westhead	961	18.12	
BNP	Paul Martin	766	14.44	
UKIP	Denis McGlone	403	7.60	
Majority		2,213	41.72	
Turnout		5,304	60	
Labour hold		Swing		

=== Dukinfield ward ===
Dukinfield
Party	Candidate	Votes	%	±%
Labour	Jacqueline Lane	2,778	55.56	
Conservative	Gaynor Paterson	1,147	22.94	
BNP	Roy West	693	13.86	
Green	Dylan Lancaster	382	7.64	
Majority		1,631	32.62	
Turnout		5,000	54	
Labour hold		Swing		

=== Dukinfield / Stalybridge ward ===
Dukinfield / Stalybridge
Party	Candidate	Votes	%	±%
Labour	Eileen Shorrock	2,304	44.84	
Conservative	Amanda Buckley	1,762	34.29	
BNP	Gregory Shorrock	549	10.69	
UKIP	Jacqueline Misell	277	5.39	
Green	Michael Smee	246	4.79	
Majority		542	10.55	
Turnout		5,138	60	
Labour hold		Swing		

=== Hyde Godley ward ===
Hyde Godley
Party	Candidate	Votes	%	±%
Labour Co-op	Jim Fitzpatrick	2,310	51.21	
Conservative	Thomas Welsby	1,279	28.35	
BNP	Robert Booth	424	9.40	
UKIP	Duran O'Dwyer	267	5.92	
Green	Glennis Sharpe	231	5.12	
Majority		1,031	22.86	
Turnout		4,511	55	
Labour Co-op hold		Swing		

=== Hyde Newton ward ===
Hyde Newton
Party	Candidate	Votes	%	±%
Labour	Philip Fitzpatrick	2,230	41.50	
Conservative	James Gradwell-Spencer	1,275	23.73	
Liberal Democrats	Maria Turner	864	16.08	
BNP	Nigel Byrne	722	13.44	
UKIP	Janette Durward	174	3.24	
Green	Jacintha Manchester	108	2.01	
Majority		955	17.77	
Turnout		5,373	56	
Labour hold		Swing		

=== Hyde Werneth ward ===
Hyde Werneth
Party	Candidate	Votes	%	±%
Conservative	Ruth Welsh	2,538	43.64	
Labour	Raja Miah	2,241	38.53	
BNP	John Wimpenny	424	7.29	
UKIP	John Cooke	318	5.47	
Green	June Gill	295	5.07	
Majority		297	5.11	
Turnout		5,816	67	
Conservative hold		Swing		

=== Longdendale ward ===
Councillor Roy Oldham died later the same year. The seat was retained for Labour by Janet Cooper in a by-election on 30 September 2010.

Longdendale
Party	Candidate	Votes	%	±%
Labour	Roy Oldham	2,084	43.72	
Conservative	Peter Hayes	1,812	38.01	
UKIP	Kevin Misell	445	9.34	
Green	Melanie Roberts	426	8.94	
Majority		272	5.71	
Turnout		4,767	62	
Labour hold		Swing		

=== Mossley ward ===
Mossley
Party	Candidate	Votes	%	±%
Labour	Paul Dowthwaite	1,918	36.52	
Independent	Ann Etchells	1,602	30.50	
Conservative	Kevin Hartley	1,233	23.48	
Green	Christine Clark	499	9.50	
Majority		316	6.02	
Turnout		5,252	63	
Labour gain from Independent		Swing		

=== St Peter's ward ===
St Peter's
Party	Candidate	Votes	%	±%
Labour	Joyce Bowerman	2,800	36.52	
Conservative	Dorothy Buckley	880	30.50	
Green	Trevor Clarke	440	23.48	
UKIP	Richard Harrison	413	9.50	
Majority		316	6.02	
Turnout		5,252	51	
Labour hold		Swing		

=== Stalybridge North ward ===
Stalybridge North
Party	Candidate	Votes	%	±%
Labour	Kevin Welsh	2,565	47.96	
Conservative	Dominic Johnson	1,730	32.35	
BNP	Jeffrey Clayton	452	8.45	
Green	Jean Smee	335	6.26	
UKIP	Tracy Radcliffe	266	4.97	
Majority		835	15.61	
Turnout		5,348	57	
Labour hold		Swing		

=== Stalybridge South ward ===
Stalybridge South
Party	Candidate	Votes	%	±%
Conservative	Basil Beeley	2,552	48.74	
Labour	Ky Marland	1,864	35.60	
Green	John Spiller	325	6.21	
BNP	Paul Hindley	276	5.27	
UKIP	Angela McManus	219	4.18	
Majority		688	13.14	
Turnout		5,236	62	
Conservative hold		Swing		
