= St Peter's (Tameside ward) =

- Electoral ward
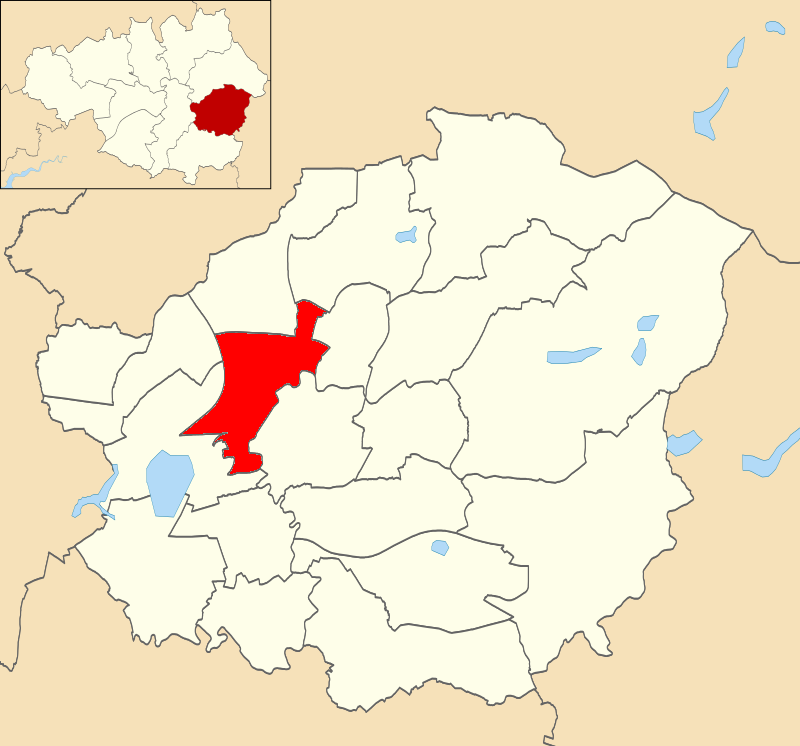
- St Peter's within Tameside

- Coat of arms
- Motto: Industry and Integrity
- Interactive map of St Peter's
- Coordinates: 53.4833°N 2.1058°W
- Country: United Kingdom
- Constituent country: England
- Region: North West England
- County: Greater Manchester
- Metropolitan borough: Tameside
- Created: 2004
- Named for: Ashton-under-Lyne

Government UK Parliament constituency: Ashton-under-Lyne
  - Type: Unicameral
  - Body: Tameside Metropolitan Borough Council
  - Leader of the Council: Brenda Warrington (Labour)
  - Councillor: Joyce Bowerman (Labour)
  - Councillor: David McNally (Labour)
  - Councillor: Warren Bray (Labour)

St Peter's is an electoral ward of Tameside, England. It is represented in Westminster by Angela Rayner Labour MP for Ashton-under-Lyne.

== Councillors ==
The ward is represented by three councillors: Joyce Bowerman (Lab), David McNally (Lab), and Warren Bray (Lab)

Election	Councillor	Councillor	Councillor
2004	Stephen Smith (Lab)	Jack Davis (Lab)	Warren Bray (Lab)
2006	Stephen Smith (Lab)	Jack Davis (Lab)	Warren Bray (Lab)
2007	Stephen Smith (Lab)	Jack Davis (Lab)	Warren Bray (Lab)
2008	Stephen Smith (Lab)	Jack Davis (Lab)	Warren Bray (Lab)
2010	Joyce Bowerman (Lab)	Jack Davis (Lab)	Warren Bray (Lab)
2011	Joyce Bowerman (Lab)	David McNally (Lab)	Warren Bray (Lab)
2012	Joyce Bowerman (Lab)	David McNally (Lab)	Warren Bray (Lab)
2014	Joyce Bowerman (Lab)	David McNally (Lab)	Warren Bray (Lab)
2015	Joyce Bowerman (Lab)	David McNally (Lab)	Warren Bray (Lab)
2016	Joyce Bowerman (Lab)	David McNally (Lab)	Warren Bray (Lab)
2018	Joyce Bowerman (Lab)	David McNally (Lab)	Warren Bray (Lab)

indicates seat up for re-election.

== Elections in 2010s ==
=== May 2018 ===
2018
Party	Candidate	Votes	%	±%
Labour	Joyce Bowerman*	1,922		
Conservative	Jeff McEwen	349		
Green	Trevor Clarke	201		
Turnout		2,479	26.2	
Labour hold		Swing		

=== May 2016 ===
2016
Party	Candidate	Votes	%	±%
Labour	Warren Bray	1,878	71.49	
Conservative	Laura Martin	300	11.42	
Green	Trevor Clarke	249	9.48	
BNP	Bill Kitchen	200	7.61	
Majority		1,578	60.07	
Turnout		2,627	30	
Labour hold		Swing		

=== May 2015 ===
2015
Party	Candidate	Votes	%	±%
Labour	Dave McNally	2,943	62.79	
UKIP	Raymond Dunning	732	15.62	
Conservative	Laura Martin	611	13.04	
Green	Trevor Clarke	328	7.00	
TUSC	Deej Johnson	73	1.56	
Majority		2,211	47.17	
Turnout		4,687	50	
Labour hold		Swing		

=== May 2014 ===
2014
Party	Candidate	Votes	%	±%
Labour	Joyce Bowerman	2,059	70.78	
BNP	Bill Kitchen	303	10.42	
Conservative	Gus Rankin	289	9.93	
Green	Trevor Clarke	258	8.87	
Majority		1,756	60.36	
Turnout		2,909	32	
Labour hold		Swing		

=== May 2012 ===
2012
Party	Candidate	Votes	%	±%
Labour	Warren Bray	1,990	77.01	+24.50
Green	Trevor Clarke	339	13.12	+2.28
Conservative	James Flynn	255	9.87	−13.79
Majority		1,651	63.89	
Turnout		2,600	28.8	+0.8
Labour hold		Swing		

=== May 2011 ===
2011
Party	Candidate	Votes	%	±%
Labour	David McNally	2,018	70.68	
Conservative	Irene Marsh	354	12.40	
UKIP	Richard Harrison	263	9.21	
Green	Trevor Clarke	220	7.71	
Majority		1,664	58.28	
Turnout		2,855	31	
Labour hold		Swing		

=== May 2010 ===
2010
Party	Candidate	Votes	%	±%
Labour	Joyce Bowerman	2,800	36.52	
Conservative	Dorothy Buckley	880	30.50	
Green	Trevor Clarke	440	23.48	
UKIP	Richard Harrison	413	9.50	
Majority		316	6.02	
Turnout		5,252	51	
Labour hold		Swing		

== Elections in 2000s ==
=== May 2008 ===
2008
Party	Candidate	Votes	%	±%
Labour	Warren Bray	1,265	52.51	
Conservative	Dorothy Ward	570	23.66	
Liberal Democrats	Ian Dunlop	313	12.99	
Green	Trevor Clarke	261	10.83	
Majority		695	28.85	
Turnout		2,409	28	
Labour hold		Swing		

=== May 2007 ===
2007
Party	Candidate	Votes	%	±%
Labour	Jack Davis	1,349	59.8	
Liberal Democrats	John Michael Piper	532	23.6	
Conservative	David Afshar	374	16.6	
Majority		817	36.2	
Turnout		2,255	27.4	
Labour hold		Swing		

=== May 2006 ===
2006
Party	Candidate	Votes	%	±%
Labour	Stephen Smith	1,254	52.58	
Liberal Democrats	John Piper	502	21.05	
Conservative	David Afshar	333	13.96	
Green	Stuart Mortimore	296	12.41	
Majority		752	31.53	
Turnout		2,385	28	
Labour hold		Swing		

=== June 2004 ===
2004
Party	Candidate	Votes	%	±%
Labour	Warren Bray	1,452	37.7	
Labour	Jack Davis	1,377		
Labour	Stephen Smith	1,332		
Liberal Democrats	Malcolm Lewis	931	24.2	
Green	Trevor Clarke	776	20.1	
Conservative	Charles Fletcher	693	18.0	
Conservative	Irene Marsh	615		
Majority				
Turnout			35.1	
