= Ashton Waterloo =

Ashton Waterloo (Tameside)
- Electoral ward
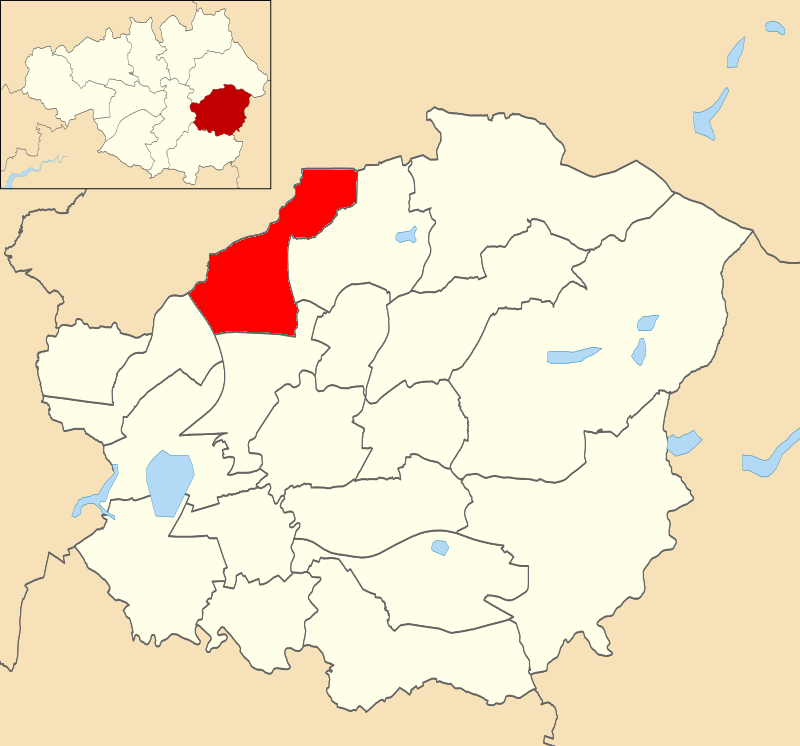
- Ashton Waterloo within Tameside

- Coat of arms
- Motto: Industry and Integrity
- Interactive map of Ashton Waterloo (Tameside)
- Coordinates: 53.5046°N 2.1021°W
- Country: United Kingdom
- Constituent country: England
- Region: North West England
- County: Greater Manchester
- Metropolitan borough: Tameside
- Created: 2004
- Named after: Ashton-under-Lyne

Government UK Parliament constituency: Ashton-under-Lyne
  - Type: Unicameral
  - Body: Tameside Metropolitan Borough Council
  - Leader of the Council: Eleanor Wills (Labour)
  - Councillor: Vimal Choksi (Labour)
  - Councillor: Raymond Dunning (Reform UK)
  - Councillor: Sangita Patel (Labour)

Ashton Waterloo is an electoral ward of Tameside, England. It is represented in Westminster by Angela Rayner Labour MP for Ashton-under-Lyne.

== Councillors ==
The ward is represented by three councillors: Vimal Choksi (Lab), Lee Huntbach (Green), and Catherine Piddington (Lab).

Election	Councillor	Councillor	Councillor
2004	Maria Bailey (Lab)	Michael Whitley (Lab)	Catherine Piddington (Lab)
2006	Lynn Travis (Lab Co-op)	Michael Whitley (Lab)	Catherine Piddington (Lab)
2007	Lynn Travis (Lab Co-op)	Michael Whitley (Lab)	Catherine Piddington (Lab)
2008	Lynn Travis (Lab Co-op)	Michael Whitley (Lab)	Catherine Piddington (Lab)
2010	Lynn Travis (Lab Co-op)	Michael Whitley (Lab)	Catherine Piddington (Lab)
2011	Lynn Travis (Lab Co-op)	Michael Whitley (Lab)	Catherine Piddington (Lab)
2012	Lynn Travis (Lab Co-op)	Michael Whitley (Lab)	Catherine Piddington (Lab)
2014	Lynn Travis (Lab Co-op)	Michael Whitley (Lab)	Catherine Piddington (Lab)
2015	Lynn Travis (Lab Co-op)	Lorraine Whitehead (Lab)	Catherine Piddington (Lab)
2016	Lynn Travis (Lab Co-op)	Lorraine Whitehead (Lab)	Catherine Piddington (Lab)
2018	Vimal Choksi (Lab)	Lorraine Whitehead (Lab)	Catherine Piddington (Lab)
Sep 2018	Vimal Choksi (Lab)	Lorraine Whitehead (Lab)	Pauline Hollinshead (Lab)
2019	Vimal Choksi (Lab)	Lee Huntbach (Green)	Pauline Hollinshead (Lab)

indicates seat up for re-election.

indicates seat up for re-election after casual vacancy.

== Elections in 2010s ==
=== September 2018 ===
Ashton Waterloo by-election, 6 September 2018
Party	Candidate	Votes	%	±%
Labour	Pauline Hollinshead	889	52.5	▼4.9
Green	Lee Huntbach	448	26.4	▲12.7
Conservative	Therese Costello	357	21.1	▼7.8
Majority		441	26.1	▼2.4
Registered electors		8,717		
Turnout		1,697	19.5	▼7.2
Rejected ballots		3	0.2	▼0.1
Labour hold		Swing	▼1.2	

=== May 2018 ===
Tameside Metropolitan Borough Council election, 3 May 2018: Ashton Waterloo
Party	Candidate	Votes	%	±%
Labour	Vimal Choksi	1,337	57.4	▼2.1
Conservative	Kate Scott	672	28.9	▲3.1
Green	Lee Huntbach	319	13.7	▼1.0
Majority		665	28.5	▼5.2
Registered electors		8,735		
Turnout		2,336	26.7	▼4.3
Rejected ballots		8	0.3	▼0.5
Labour hold		Swing	▼2.6	

=== May 2016 ===
2016
Party	Candidate	Votes	%	±%
Labour	Catherine Piddington	1,560	59.54	
Conservative	Sam Daniels	675	25.76	
Green	Andrew Threlfall	385	14.69	
Majority		885	33.78	
Turnout		2,620	31	
Labour hold		Swing		

=== May 2015 ===
2015
Party	Candidate	Votes	%	±%
Labour	Lorraine Whitehead	2,382	48.03	
Conservative	Sam Daniels	1,240	25.01	
UKIP	Peter Howarth	1,063	21.44	
Green	Andrew Threlfall	274	5.53	
Majority		1,142	23.03	
Turnout		4,959	57	
Labour hold		Swing		

=== May 2014 ===
2014
Party	Candidate	Votes	%	±%
Labour Co-op	Lynne Travis	1,447	52.33	
Conservative	Jack Rankin	858	31.03	
Green	Andrew Threlfall	460	16.64	
Majority		589	21.30	
Turnout		2,765	32	
Labour Co-op hold		Swing		

=== May 2012 ===
2012
Party	Candidate	Votes	%	±%
Labour	Catherine Piddington*	1,703	65.5	+24.98
Conservative	Lee Price	442	17	−13.39
UKIP	Peter Taylor	257	9.88	N/A
Green	Andrew Threlfall	198	7.62	+3.25
Majority		1,261	48.5	
Turnout		2,613	30	−4
Labour hold		Swing		

=== May 2011 ===
2011
Party	Candidate	Votes	%	±%
Labour	Michael Whitley	1,860	61.61	
Conservative	Lee Price	732	24.25	
UKIP	Jeanette Harrison	256	8.48	
Green	Michael Baker	171	5.66	
Majority		1,128	37.36	
Turnout		3,019	35	
Labour hold		Swing		

=== May 2010 ===
2010
Party	Candidate	Votes	%	±%
Labour Co-op	Lynn Travis	2,583	52.68	
Conservative	Stacey Knighton	1,377	28.08	
BNP	David Gough	526	10.73	
UKIP	Colette Barlow	417	8.50	
Majority		1,206	24.60	
Turnout		4,903	59	
Labour Co-op hold		Swing		

== Elections in 2000s ==
=== May 2008 ===
2008
Party	Candidate	Votes	%	±%
Labour	Catherine Piddington	1,152	40.52	
Conservative	Dot Buckley	864	30.39	
BNP	Anthony Jones	473	16.64	
Liberal Democrats	Paul Daly	230	8.09	
Green	Nigel Rolland	124	4.36	
Majority		288	10.13	
Turnout		2,843	34	
Labour hold		Swing		

=== May 2007 ===
2007
Party	Candidate	Votes	%	±%
Labour	Mike Whiteley	1,238	42.8	
Conservative	Gareth Quinn	723	25.0	
BNP	David Jones	509	17.6	
Liberal Democrats	John Bartley	257	8.9	
Green	Andrew David Threlfall	163	5.6	
Majority		515	17.8	
Turnout		2,890	35.4	
Labour hold		Swing		

=== May 2006 ===
2006
Party	Candidate	Votes	%	±%
Labour Co-op	Lynn Travis	1,257	40.82	
Conservative	Suzanne Ambler	767	24.91	
BNP	Anthony Jones	755	24.52	
Green	Andrew Threlfall	300	9.74	
Majority		490	15.91	
Turnout		3,079	36	
Labour Co-op hold		Swing		

=== June 2004 ===
2004
Party	Candidate	Votes	%	±%
Labour	Catherine Piddington	1,588	42.7	
Labour	Michael Whitley	1,403		
Labour	Maria Bailey	1,213		
Conservative	Stephen Hepburn	1,121	30.1	
Conservative	John Marsh	1,064		
Independent	Alexander Mee	1,013	27.2	
Majority				
Turnout			37.2	
