= 2011 Tameside Metropolitan Borough Council election =

2011 local election in England

Results of the 2011 Tameside Metropolitan Borough Council election

Elections to Tameside Metropolitan Borough Council were held on 5 May 2011. One third of the council was up for election, with each successful candidate to serve a four-year term of office, expiring in 2015. The Labour Party retained overall control of the council.

== Ward results ==
=== Ashton Hurst ward ===
Ashton Hurst
Party	Candidate	Votes	%	±%
Labour	Alan Whitehead	1,707	52.39	
Conservative	Dave Westhead	1,114	34.19	
Green	Nigel Rolland	237	7.27	
UKIP	Peter Taylor	200	6.14	
Majority		593	18.20	
Turnout		3,258	37	
Labour hold		Swing		

=== Ashton St. Michael's ward ===
Ashton St. Michael's
Party	Candidate	Votes	%	±%
Labour	Yvonne Cartey	1,627	56.65	
Conservative	Paul Buckley	716	24.93	
English Democrat	David Timpson	239	8.32	
UKIP	Andy Gee	145	5.05	
Green	Rochelle Rolland	145	5.05	
Majority		911	31.72	
Turnout		2,872	33	
Labour hold		Swing		

=== Ashton Waterloo ward ===
Ashton Waterloo
Party	Candidate	Votes	%	±%
Labour	Michael Whitley	1,860	61.61	
Conservative	Lee Price	732	24.25	
UKIP	Jeanette Harrison	256	8.48	
Green	Michael Baker	171	5.66	
Majority		1,128	37.36	
Turnout		3,019	35	
Labour hold		Swing		

=== Audenshaw ward ===
Audenshaw
Party	Candidate	Votes	%	±%
Labour	Maria Bailey	1,750	55.86	
Conservative	Stacey Knighton	795	25.38	
BNP	Robert Booth	239	7.63	
UKIP	Joanna Herod	198	6.32	
Green	Stuart Bennett	151	4.82	
Majority		955	30.48	
Turnout		3,133	36	
Labour hold		Swing		

=== Denton North East ward ===
Denton North East
Party	Candidate	Votes	%	±%
Labour	Allison Gwynne	1,871	63.29	
Conservative	Christine Walters	639	21.62	
UKIP	Anthony Misell	268	9.07	
Green	Gerard Boyd	178	6.02	
Majority		1,232	41.68	
Turnout		2,956	35	
Labour hold		Swing		

=== Denton South ward ===
Denton South
Party	Candidate	Votes	%	±%
Labour	Michael Fowler	1,628	54.83	
Conservative	Steve Roden	545	18.36	
Independent	Carl Simmons	471	15.86	
UKIP	Adrienne Bennett	325	10.95	
Majority		1,083	36.48	
Turnout		2,969	35	
Labour hold		Swing		

=== Denton West ward ===
Denton West
Party	Candidate	Votes	%	±%
Labour	Brenda Warrington	2,378	64.39	
Conservative	Floyd Paterson	948	25.67	
UKIP	Michelle Harrison	367	9.94	
Majority		1,430	38.72	
Turnout		3,693	40	
Labour hold		Swing		

=== Droylsden East ward ===
Droylsden East
Party	Candidate	Votes	%	±%
Labour Co-op	Kieran Quinn	1,969	62.89	
UKIP	Ted Salmon	595	19.00	
Conservative	Dorothy Buckley	455	14.53	
Green	Mark Stanley	112	3.58	
Majority		1,374	43.88	
Turnout		3,131	36	
Labour Co-op hold		Swing		

=== Droylsden West ward ===
Droylsden West
Party	Candidate	Votes	%	±%
Labour	Ann Holland	2,212	70.90	
Conservative	Sue Murphy	384	12.31	
BNP	Karen Lomas	282	9.04	
UKIP	George Mills	242	7.76	
Majority		1,828	58.59	
Turnout		3,120	35	
Labour hold		Swing		

=== Dukinfield ward ===
Dukinfield
Party	Candidate	Votes	%	±%
Labour	John Taylor	1,905	60.88	
Conservative	Christine Marshall	550	17.58	
BNP	Roy West	340	10.87	
UKIP	John Cooke	189	6.04	
Green	Dylan Lancaster	145	4.63	
Majority		1,355	43.30	
Turnout		3,129	33	
Labour hold		Swing		

=== Dukinfield / Stalybridge ward ===
Dukinfield / Stalybridge
Party	Candidate	Votes	%	±%
Labour	David Sweeton	1,703	54.76	
Conservative	Amanda Buckley	888	28.55	
BNP	Gregory Shorrock	192	6.17	
Green	Michael Smee	170	5.47	
UKIP	Jacqueline Misell	157	5.05	
Majority		815	26.21	
Turnout		3,110	36	
Labour hold		Swing		

=== Hyde Godley ward ===
Hyde Godley
Party	Candidate	Votes	%	±%
Labour	John Sullivan	1,779	64.15	
Conservative	Thomas Welsby	636	22.15	
UKIP	Duran O'Dwyer	358	12.91	
Majority		1,143	41.22	
Turnout		2,773	33	
Labour hold		Swing		

=== Hyde Newton ward ===
Hyde Newton
Party	Candidate	Votes	%	±%
Labour Co-op	Helen Bowden	1,890	57.01	
Conservative	Craig Halliday	717	21.63	
BNP	Rosalind Gauci	335	10.11	
UKIP	Ian Horton	239	7.21	
Green	Jacintha Manchester	134	4.04	
Majority		1,173	35.38	
Turnout		3,315	33	
Labour Co-op hold		Swing		

=== Hyde Werneth ward ===
Hyde Werneth
Party	Candidate	Votes	%	±%
Conservative	John Bell	1,858	46.16	
Labour	Raja Miah	1,726	42.88	
Green	June Gill	242	6.01	
UKIP	Stephanie Misell	199	4.94	
Majority		132	3.28	
Turnout		4,025	46	
Conservative hold		Swing		

=== Longdendale ward ===
Longdendale
Party	Candidate	Votes	%	±%
Labour Co-op	Gillian Peet	1,591	49.73	
Conservative	Robert Adlard	1,209	37.79	
UKIP	Kevin Misell	206	6.44	
Green	Melanie Roberts	193	6.03	
Majority		382	11.94	
Turnout		3,199	41	
Labour Co-op hold		Swing		

=== Mossley ward ===
Mossley
Party	Candidate	Votes	%	±%
Labour Co-op	Idu Miah	1,779	51.94	
Independent	Valerie Carter	1,115	32.55	
Green	Christine Clark	334	9.75	
UKIP	Emma Misell	197	5.75	
Majority		664	19.39	
Turnout		3,425	40	
Labour Co-op gain from Independent		Swing		

=== St Peter's ward ===
St Peter's
Party	Candidate	Votes	%	±%
Labour	David McNally	2,018	70.68	
Conservative	Irene Marsh	354	12.40	
UKIP	Richard Harrison	263	9.21	
Green	Trevor Clarke	220	7.71	
Majority		1,664	58.28	
Turnout		2,855	31	
Labour hold		Swing		

=== Stalybridge North ward ===
Stalybridge North
Party	Candidate	Votes	%	±%
Labour Co-op	George Roberts	1,667	54.19	
Conservative	Dominic Johnson	952	30.95	
Green	Jean Smee	230	7.48	
UKIP	Tracy Radcliffe	227	7.38	
Majority		715	23.24	
Turnout		3,076	32	
Labour Co-op hold		Swing		

=== Stalybridge South ward ===
Stalybridge South
Party	Candidate	Votes	%	±%
Conservative	David Buckley	1,672	54.16	
Labour	Stuart Green	1,008	32.65	
Green	John Spiller	233	7.55	
UKIP	Angela McManus	174	5.64	
Majority		664	21.51	
Turnout		3,087	36	
Conservative hold		Swing		
