= Droylsden West =

Droylsden West (Tameside)
- Electoral ward
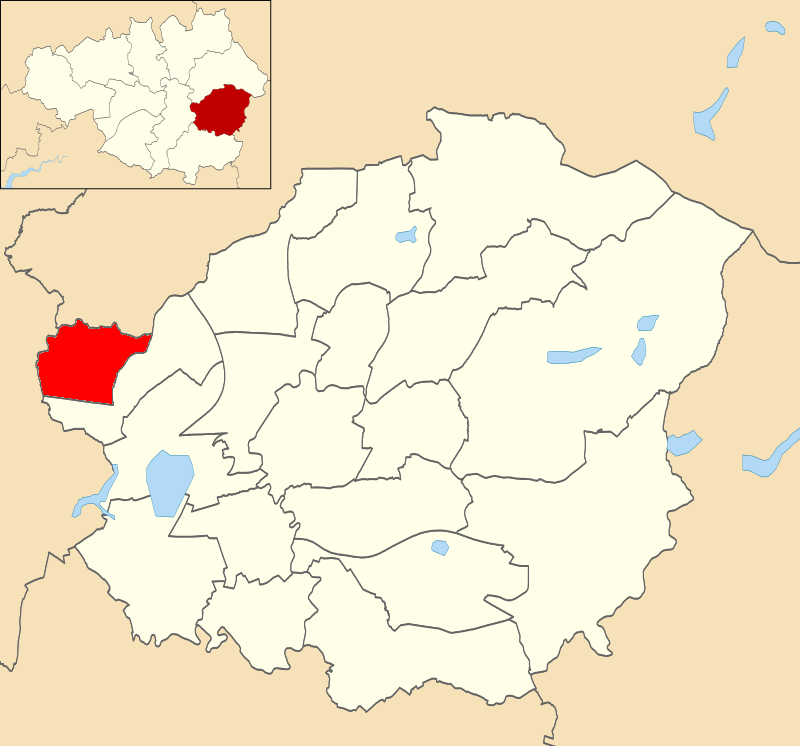
- Droylsden West within Tameside

- Coat of arms
- Motto: Industry and Integrity
- Interactive map of Droylsden West (Tameside)
- Coordinates: 53.4870°N 2.1552°W
- Country: United Kingdom
- Constituent country: England
- Region: North West England
- County: Greater Manchester
- Metropolitan borough: Tameside
- Created: 2004
- Named after: Ashton-under-Lyne

Government UK Parliament constituency: Ashton-under-Lyne
  - Type: Unicameral
  - Body: Tameside Metropolitan Borough Council
  - Leader of the Council: Brenda Warrington (Labour)
  - Councillor: Barrie Holland (Labour)
  - Councillor: Ann Holland (Labour)
  - Councillor: Gerald Cooney (Labour)

Droylsden West is an electoral ward of Tameside, England. It is represented in Westminster by Angela Rayner Labour MP for Ashton-under-Lyne.

== Councillors ==
The ward is represented by three councillors: Barrie Holland (Lab), Ann Holland (Lab), and Gerald Cooney (Lab).

Election	Councillor	Councillor	Councillor
2004	Barrie Holland (Lab)	Ann Holland (Lab)	Gerald Cooney (Lab)
2006	Barrie Holland (Lab)	Ann Holland (Lab)	Gerald Cooney (Lab)
2007	Barrie Holland (Lab)	Ann Holland (Lab)	Gerald Cooney (Lab)
2008	Barrie Holland (Lab)	Ann Holland (Lab)	Gerald Cooney (Lab)
2010	Barrie Holland (Lab)	Ann Holland (Lab)	Gerald Cooney (Lab)
2011	Barrie Holland (Lab)	Ann Holland (Lab)	Gerald Cooney (Lab)
2012	Barrie Holland (Lab)	Ann Holland (Lab)	Gerald Cooney (Lab)
2014	Barrie Holland (Lab)	Ann Holland (Lab)	Gerald Cooney (Lab)
2015	Barrie Holland (Lab)	Ann Holland (Lab)	Gerald Cooney (Lab)
2016	Barrie Holland (Lab)	Ann Holland (Lab)	Gerald Cooney (Lab)
2018	Barrie Holland (Lab)	Ann Holland (Lab)	Gerald Cooney (Lab)

indicates seat up for re-election.

== Elections in 2010s ==
=== May 2018 ===
2018
Party	Candidate	Votes	%	±%
Labour	Barrie Holland*	1,453		
Conservative	Declan Ruane	362		
Green	Annie Train	274		
UKIP	Maurice Jackson	197		
Turnout		2,293	25.4	
Labour hold		Swing		

=== May 2016 ===
2016
Party	Candidate	Votes	%	±%
Labour	Gerald Cooney	1,665	81.18	
Conservative	Kate Harvey	241	11.75	
Green	Andrew Climance	145	7.07	
Majority		1,424	69.43	
Turnout		2,051	32	
Labour hold		Swing		

=== May 2015 ===
2015
Party	Candidate	Votes	%	±%
Labour	Ann Holland	2,881	54.39	
UKIP	Max Bennett	1,338	25.26	
Conservative	Gill Westhead	766	14.46	
Green	Andrew Climance	312	5.89	
Majority		1,543	29.13	
Turnout		5,297	58	
Labour hold		Swing		

=== May 2014 ===
2014
Party	Candidate	Votes	%	±%
Labour	Barrie Holland	1,584	52.02	
UKIP	Tracy Radcliffe	971	31.89	
Conservative	Gill Westhead	235	7.72	
Green	Jo Booth	149	4.89	
BNP	Ian Conner	106	3.48	
Majority		613	20.13	
Turnout		3,045	34	
Labour hold		Swing		

=== May 2012 ===
2012
Party	Candidate	Votes	%	±%
Labour	Gerald Cooney	2,028	75.33	+16.76
UKIP	George Mills	305	11.33	N/A
Conservative	Dot Buckley	214	7.95	−13.68
Green	Jennifer Ball	145	5.39	N/A
Majority		1,723	64.00	
Turnout		2,700	30.2	−4.4
Labour hold		Swing		

=== May 2011 ===
2011
Party	Candidate	Votes	%	±%
Labour	Ann Holland	2,212	70.90	
Conservative	Sue Murphy	384	12.31	
BNP	Karen Lomas	282	9.04	
UKIP	George Mills	242	7.76	
Majority		1,828	58.59	
Turnout		3,120	35	
Labour hold		Swing		

=== May 2010 ===
2010
Party	Candidate	Votes	%	±%
Labour	Barrie Holland	3,174	59.84	
Conservative	David Westhead	961	18.12	
BNP	Paul Martin	766	14.44	
UKIP	Denis McGlone	403	7.60	
Majority		2,213	41.72	
Turnout		5,304	60	
Labour hold		Swing		

== Elections in 2000s ==
=== May 2008 ===
2008
Party	Candidate	Votes	%	±%
Labour	Gerald Cooney	1,779	58.58	
Conservative	Gillian Westhead	657	21.63	
BNP	Paul Hindley	601	19.79	
Majority		1,122	36.94	
Turnout		3,037	35	
Labour hold		Swing		

=== May 2007 ===
2007
Party	Candidate	Votes	%	±%
Labour	Ann Holland	1,977	66.4	
BNP	Paul Hindley	546	18.3	
Conservative	Charles Bryan Fletcher	456	15.3	
Majority		1,431	48.0	
Turnout		2,945	35.0	
Labour hold		Swing		

=== May 2006 ===
2006
Party	Candidate	Votes	%	±%
Labour	Barrie Holland	1,838	61.21	
BNP	Paul Hindley	745	24.81	
Conservative	Charles Fletcher	420	13.99	
Majority		1,093	36.40	
Turnout		3,003	34	
Labour hold		Swing		

=== June 2004 ===
2004
Party	Candidate	Votes	%	±%
Labour	Gerald Cooney	2,205	58.0	
Labour	Ann Holland	2,184		
Labour	Barrie Holland	2,078		
Independent	Anthony Affleck	909	23.9	
Conservative	Dorothy Buckley	689	18.1	
Majority				
Turnout			37.7	
