= 2016 Tameside Metropolitan Borough Council election =

2016 local election in England

2016 local election results in Tameside

The 2016 Tameside Metropolitan Borough Council election took place on 5 May 2016 to elect members of Tameside Metropolitan Borough Council in England. This was on the same day as other local elections.

After the election, the composition of the council was:

- Labour 51
- Conservative 6

== Ward results ==
=== Ashton Hurst ward ===
Ashton Hurst
Party	Candidate	Votes	%	±%
Labour	Leigh Drennan	1,536	47.42	
Conservative	Liam Billington	1,412	43.59	
Green	Nigel Rolland	291	8.98	
Majority		124	3.83	
Turnout		3,239	37	
Labour hold		Swing		

=== Ashton St. Michaels ward ===
Ashton St. Michael's
Party	Candidate	Votes	%	±%
Labour	Margaret Sidebottom	1,714	70.10	
Conservative	Christine Liley	731	29.90	
Majority		983	40.20	
Turnout		2,445	29	
Labour hold		Swing		

=== Ashton Waterloo ward ===
Ashton Waterloo
Party	Candidate	Votes	%	±%
Labour	Catherine Piddington	1,560	59.54	
Conservative	Sam Daniels	675	25.76	
Green	Andrew Threlfall	385	14.69	
Majority		885	33.78	
Turnout		2,620	31	
Labour hold		Swing		

=== Audenshaw ward ===
Audenshaw
Party	Candidate	Votes	%	±%
Labour	Teresa Smith	1,465	45.31	
Conservative	David Johnson	858	26.54	
UKIP	Maurice Jackson	725	22.42	
Green	Joe Henthorn	167	5.17	
Community Party of Great Britain	Paul Ward	18	0.56	
Majority		607	18.78	
Turnout		3,233	35	
Labour hold		Swing		

=== Denton North East ward ===
Denton North East
Party	Candidate	Votes	%	±%
Labour	Denise Ward	1,505	55.70	
UKIP	Dennis Connor	755	27.94	
Conservative	Dawn Cobb	442	16.36	
Majority		750	27.76	
Turnout		2,702	32	
Labour hold		Swing		

=== Denton South ward ===
Denton South
Party	Candidate	Votes	%	±%
Labour	George Newton	1,559	50.11	
Independent	Carl Simmons	1,001	32.18	
UKIP	Adrienne Shaw	354	11.38	
Conservative	Carol White	197	6.33	
Majority		558	17.94	
Turnout		3,111	37	
Labour hold		Swing		

=== Denton West ward ===
Denton West
Party	Candidate	Votes	%	±%
Labour	Dawson Lane	1,936	59.13	
UKIP	Max Bennett	654	19.98	
Conservative	Carl Edwards	506	15.46	
Green	Gareth Hayes	178	5.44	
Majority		1,282	39.16	
Turnout		3,274	37	
Labour hold		Swing		

=== Droylsden East ward ===
Droylsden East
Party	Candidate	Votes	%	±%
Labour	Jim Middleton	1,449	51.40	
UKIP	Ted Salmon	948	33.63	
Conservative	Scott Truter	256	9.08	
Green	Annie Train	166	5.89	
Majority		501	17.77	
Turnout		2,819	32	
Labour hold		Swing		

=== Droylsden West ward ===
Droylsden West
Party	Candidate	Votes	%	±%
Labour	Gerald Cooney	1,665	81.18	
Conservative	Kate Harvey	241	11.75	
Green	Andrew Climance	145	7.07	
Majority		1,424	69.43	
Turnout		2,051	32	
Labour hold		Swing		

=== Dukinfield ward ===
Dukinfield
Party	Candidate	Votes	%	±%
Labour	Brian Wild	1,400	52.65	
UKIP	Ian Cooke	590	22.19	
Conservative	David Woodward	367	13.80	
Green	Julie Wood	162	6.09	
Independent	Dave Tate	140	5.27	
Majority		810	30.46	
Turnout		2,659	29	
Labour hold		Swing		

=== Dukinfield / Stalybridge ward ===
Dukinfield / Stalybridge
Party	Candidate	Votes	%	±%
Labour	Leanne Feeley	1,548	57.44	
UKIP	David Anderson	772	28.65	
Independent	Chris Caton-Greasley	375	13.91	
Majority		776	28.79	
Turnout		2,695	32	
Labour hold		Swing		

=== Hyde Godley ward ===
Hyde Godley
Party	Candidate	Votes	%	±%
Labour	Joe Kitchen	1,440	54.38	
UKIP	Andrea Colbourne	842	31.80	
Conservative	Forhad Jani	366	13.82	
Majority		598	22.58	
Turnout		2,648	31	
Labour hold		Swing		

=== Hyde Newton ward ===
Hyde Newton
Party	Candidate	Votes	%	±%
Labour Co-op	Peter Robinson	1,587	52.55	
UKIP	Philip Chadwick	1,132	37.48	
Green	Andrew Highton	301	9.97	
Majority		455	15.07	
Turnout		3,020	30	
Labour Co-op hold		Swing		

=== Hyde Werneth ward ===
Hyde Werneth
Party	Candidate	Votes	%	±%
Conservative	Ruth Welsh	1,771	51.23	
Labour	Raja Miah	1,686	48.77	
Majority		85	2.46	
Turnout		3,457	41	
Conservative gain from Labour		Swing		

=== Longdendale ward ===
Longdendale
Party	Candidate	Votes	%	±%
Labour	Chris Buglass	1,261	48.11	
Conservative	David Tyler	784	29.91	
UKIP	Michael Booth	400	15.26	
Green	Irene Brierley	176	6.71	
Majority		477	18.20	
Turnout		2,621	34	
Labour hold		Swing		

=== Mossley ward ===
Double election due to the resignation of Labour's Idu Miah (elected May 2015). His seat was retained for Labour by Tafheen Sharif.

Mossley
Party	Candidate	Votes	%	±%
Labour	Jack Homer	1,140	39.34	
Labour	Tafheen Sharif	784	27.05	
Independent	Lesley Bill	765	26.40	
Independent	Dean Aylett	705	24.33	
Independent	Christine Lyness	647	22.33	
Independent	Claire Hardisty	408	14.08	
Green	Christine Clark	339	11.70	
Conservative	Phil Rogers	321	11.08	
Green	Stuart Bennett	222	7.66	
Liberal Democrats	Martin Kiely	134	4.62	
Majority		356	6.51	
Turnout		5,465	34	
Labour hold		Swing		
Labour hold		Swing		

=== St Peter's ward ===
St Peter's
Party	Candidate	Votes	%	±%
Labour	Warren Bray	1,878	71.49	
Conservative	Laura Martin	300	11.42	
Green	Trevor Clarke	249	9.48	
BNP	Bill Kitchen	200	7.61	
Majority		1,578	60.07	
Turnout		2,627	30	
Labour hold		Swing		

=== Stalybridge North ward ===
Stalybridge North
Party	Candidate	Votes	%	±%
Labour Co-op	Jan Jackson	1,299	51.94	
Conservative	Colin White	795	31.79	
Green	Jean Smee	407	16.27	
Majority		504	20.15	
Turnout		2,501	27	
Labour Co-op hold		Swing		

=== Stalybridge South ward ===
Stalybridge South
Party	Candidate	Votes	%	±%
Conservative	Doreen Dickinson	1,442	52.84	
Labour	Oliver Cross	984	36.06	
Green	Paul White	303	11.10	
Majority		458	16.78	
Turnout		2,729	33	
Conservative hold		Swing		
