= Stalybridge South =

Stalybridge South (Tameside)
- Electoral ward
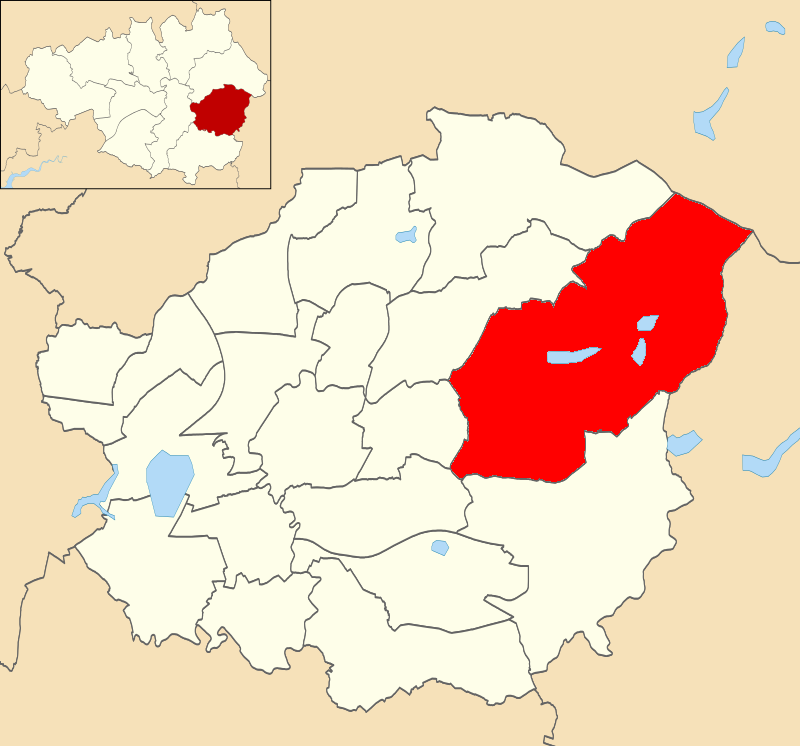
- Stalybridge South within Tameside

- Coat of arms
- Motto: Industry and Integrity
- Interactive map of Stalybridge South (Tameside)
- Coordinates: 53.4897°N 2.0085°W
- Country: United Kingdom
- Constituent country: England
- Region: North West England
- County: Greater Manchester
- Metropolitan borough: Tameside
- Created: 2004
- Named for: Stalybridge and Hyde

Government UK Parliament constituency: Stalybridge and Hyde
  - Type: Unicameral
  - Body: Tameside Metropolitan Borough Council
  - Leader of the Council: Brenda Warrington (Labour)
  - Councillor: Liam Billington (Conservative)
  - Councillor: Clive Patrick (Conservative)
  - Councillor: Doreen Dickinson (Conservative)

Stalybridge South is an electoral ward of Tameside, England. It is represented in Westminster by Jonathan Reynolds Labour Co-operative MP for Stalybridge and Hyde.

== Councillors ==
The ward is represented by three councillors: Liam Billington (Con), Clive Patrick (Con), and Doreen Dickinson (Con).

Election	Councillor	Councillor	Councillor
2004	Suzanne Shepherd (Con)	Colin Grantham (Con)	Doreen Dickinson (Con)
2006	Basil Beeley (Con)	Colin Grantham (Con)	Doreen Dickinson (Con)
2007	Basil Beeley (Con)	David Buckley (Con)	Doreen Dickinson (Con)
2008	Basil Beeley (Con)	David Buckley (Con)	Doreen Dickinson (Con)
2010	Basil Beeley (Con)	David Buckley (Con)	Doreen Dickinson (Con)
2011	Basil Beeley (Con)	David Buckley (Con)	Doreen Dickinson (Con)
2012	Basil Beeley (Con)	David Buckley (Con)	Doreen Dickinson (Con)
2014	Basil Beeley (Con)	David Buckley (Con)	Doreen Dickinson (Con)
2015	Basil Beeley (Con)	Clive Patrick (Con)	Doreen Dickinson (Con)
2016	Basil Beeley (Con)	Clive Patrick (Con)	Doreen Dickinson (Con)
2018	Liam Billington (Con)	Clive Patrick (Con)	Doreen Dickinson (Con)

indicates seat up for re-election.

== Elections in 2010s ==
=== May 2018 ===
2018
Party	Candidate	Votes	%	±%
Conservative	Liam Billington	1,233		
Labour	Katy Flanagan	834		
Your Town, Our Town, Stalybridge Town	Jennifer Brayne	582		
Green	Amanda Hickling	106		
Turnout		2,760	25	
Conservative hold		Swing		

=== May 2016 ===
2016
Party	Candidate	Votes	%	±%
Conservative	Doreen Dickinson	1,442	52.84	
Labour	Oliver Cross	984	36.06	
Green	Paul White	303	11.10	
Majority		458	16.78	
Turnout		2,729	33	
Conservative hold		Swing		

=== May 2015 ===
2015
Party	Candidate	Votes	%	±%
Conservative	Clive Patrick	2,627	51.86	
Labour	Dorothy Cartwright	1,842	36.36	
Green	Paul White	597	11.78	
Majority		785	15.50	
Turnout		5,066	59	
Conservative hold		Swing		

=== May 2014 ===
2014
Party	Candidate	Votes	%	±%
Conservative	Basil Beeley	1,123	41.06	
Labour	Dorothy Cartwright	813	29.73	
UKIP	Colette Barlow	603	22.05	
Green	Mohammed Ramzan	196	7.17	
Majority		310	11.33	
Turnout		2,735	32	
Conservative hold		Swing		

=== May 2012 ===
2012
Party	Candidate	Votes	%	±%
Conservative	Doreen Dickinson	1,368	51.76	−12.06
Labour	Dorothy Cartwright	935	35.38	+13.90
Green	John Spiller	179	6.77	−1.05
UKIP	Angela McManus	161	6.09	−0.79
Majority		433	16.38	
Turnout		2,656	31.1	−2.4
Conservative hold		Swing		

=== May 2011 ===
2011
Party	Candidate	Votes	%	±%
Conservative	David Buckley	1,672	54.16	
Labour	Stuart Green	1,008	32.65	
Green	John Spiller	233	7.55	
UKIP	Angela McManus	174	5.64	
Majority		664	21.51	
Turnout		3,087	36	
Conservative hold		Swing		

=== May 2010 ===
2010
Party	Candidate	Votes	%	±%
Conservative	Basil Beeley	2,552	48.74	
Labour	Ky Marland	1,864	35.60	
Green	John Spiller	325	6.21	
BNP	Paul Hindley	276	5.27	
UKIP	Angela McManus	219	4.18	
Majority		688	13.14	
Turnout		5,236	62	
Conservative hold		Swing		

== Elections in 2000s ==
=== May 2008 ===
2008
Party	Candidate	Votes	%	±%
Conservative	Doreen Dickinson	1,771	63.82	
Labour	Pauline Harrison	596	21.48	
Green	Melanie Roberts	217	7.82	
UKIP	Angela McManus	191	6.88	
Majority		1,175	42.34	
Turnout		2,775	33	
Conservative hold		Swing		

=== May 2007 ===
2007
Party	Candidate	Votes	%	±%
Conservative	David Buckley	1,425	55.2	
Labour	Eleanor Ballagher	742	28.7	
Green	Jacintha Muriel Manchester	271	10.5	
UKIP	Angela McManus	143	5.5	
Majority		683	26.5	
Turnout		2,581	31.6	
Conservative hold		Swing		

=== May 2006 ===
2006
Party	Candidate	Votes	%	±%
Conservative	Basil Beeley	1,392	56.49	
Labour	Bill Fairfoull	610	24.76	
Green	Melanie Roberts	462	18.75	
Majority		782	31.74	
Turnout		2,464	32	
Conservative hold		Swing		

=== June 2004 ===
2004
Party	Candidate	Votes	%	±%
Conservative	Doreen Dickinson	1,810	51.3	
Conservative	Colin Grantham	1,619		
Conservative	Suzanne Shepherd	1,617		
Labour	William Fairfoull	1,144	32.4	
Labour	Glennys Hammond	1,092		
Labour	Gary Arthurs	1,021		
BNP	Nigel Byrne	573	16.2	
Majority				
Turnout			39.6	
