= 2014 Tameside Metropolitan Borough Council election =

2014 UK local government election

Results of the 2014 Tameside Metropolitan Borough Council election

The 2014 Tameside Metropolitan Borough Council election took place on 22 May 2014 to elect members of Tameside Metropolitan Borough Council in England. This was on the same day as other local elections.

== Ward results ==
=== Ashton Hurst ward ===
Ashton Hurst
Party	Candidate	Votes	%	±%
Conservative	Paul Buckley	1,377	43.17	
Labour	Debbie Boulton	1,359	42.60	
Green	Charlotte Hughes	436	13.67	
Majority		18	0.56	
Turnout		3,172	36	
Conservative gain from Labour		Swing		

=== Ashton St. Michael's ward ===
Ashton St. Michael's
Party	Candidate	Votes	%	±%
Labour	Bill Fairfoull	1,466	57.78	
Conservative	Liam Billington	494	19.47	
Green	Nigel Rolland	426	16.79	
Patriotic Socialist	Mary Doherty	151	5.95	
Majority		972	38.31	
Turnout		2,537	29	
Labour hold		Swing		

=== Ashton Waterloo ward ===
Ashton Waterloo
Party	Candidate	Votes	%	±%
Labour Co-op	Lynne Travis	1,447	52.33	
Conservative	Jack Rankin	858	31.03	
Green	Andrew Threlfall	460	16.64	
Majority		589	21.30	
Turnout		2,765	32	
Labour Co-op hold		Swing		

=== Audenshaw ward ===
Audenshaw
Party	Candidate	Votes	%	±%
Labour	Oliver Ryan	1,284	42.32	
UKIP	David Turner	1,162	38.30	
Conservative	Colin White	429	14.14	
Green	Nancy Jaegar	159	5.24	
Majority		122	4.02	
Turnout		3,034	33	
Labour hold		Swing		

=== Denton North East ward ===
Denton North East
Party	Candidate	Votes	%	±%
Labour	Vincent Ricci	1,251	46.32	
UKIP	Dennis Connor	906	33.54	
Conservative	Carol White	344	12.74	
Green	Gerard Boyd	200	7.40	
Majority		345	12.77	
Turnout		2,701	31	
Labour hold		Swing		

=== Denton South ward ===
Denton South
Party	Candidate	Votes	%	±%
Labour	Claire Francis	1,160	41.88	
Independent	Carl Simmons	1,085	39.17	
Conservative	Jacob Sutcliffe	342	12.35	
Green	Michael Smee	92	3.32	
TUSC	Dean Kavanagh	91	3.29	
Majority		75	2.71	
Turnout		2,770	33	
Labour hold		Swing		

=== Denton West ward ===
Denton West
Party	Candidate	Votes	%	±%
Labour	Michael Smith	2,068	65.07	
Conservative	Thomas Dunne	778	24.48	
Green	Jacintha Manchester	332	10.45	
Majority		1,290	40.59	
Turnout		3,178	34	
Labour hold		Swing		

=== Droylsden East ward ===
Droylsden East
Party	Candidate	Votes	%	±%
Labour Co-op	Sue Quinn	1,431	47.73	
UKIP	Ted Salmon	1,168	38.71	
Conservative	Liv Brannon	250	8.29	
Green	Mark Stanley	168	5.57	
Majority		263	8.72	
Turnout		3,017	34	
Labour Co-op hold		Swing		

=== Droylsden West ward ===
Droylsden West
Party	Candidate	Votes	%	±%
Labour	Barrie Holland	1,584	52.02	
UKIP	Tracy Radcliffe	971	31.89	
Conservative	Gill Westhead	235	7.72	
Green	Jo Booth	149	4.89	
BNP	Ian Conner	106	3.48	
Majority		613	20.13	
Turnout		3,045	34	
Labour hold		Swing		

=== Dukinfield ward ===
Dukinfield
Party	Candidate	Votes	%	±%
Labour	Jacqueline Lane	1,419	49.68	
UKIP	John Cooke	866	30.32	
Conservative	Zoe Gallagher	352	12.32	
Green	Julie Wood	219	7.67	
Majority		553	19.36	
Turnout		2,856	30	
Labour hold		Swing		

=== Dukinfield / Stalybridge ward ===
Dukinfield / Stalybridge
Party	Candidate	Votes	%	±%
Labour	Eleanor Ballagher	1,194	40.89	
UKIP	Wayne Jones	954	32.67	
Conservative	Christine Liley	507	17.36	
Green	Emily Kelly	206	7.05	
Independent	Steve Starlord	59	2.02	
Majority		240	8.22	
Turnout		2,920	33	
Labour gain from Conservative		Swing		

=== Hyde Godley ward ===
Hyde Godley
Party	Candidate	Votes	%	±%
Labour Co-op	Jim Fitzpatrick	1,597	62.16	
Conservative	Mohammed Iqbal	493	19.19	
Green	Nicholas Koopman	479	18.65	
Majority		1,104	42.97	
Turnout		2,569	30	
Labour Co-op hold		Swing		

=== Hyde Newton ward ===
Hyde Newton
Party	Candidate	Votes	%	±%
Labour	Philip Fitzpatrick	1,406	46.79	
UKIP	Gail Jones	962	32.01	
Conservative	Craig Halliday	415	13.81	
Green	Andrew Highton	222	7.39	
Majority		444	14.78	
Turnout		3,005	30	
Labour hold		Swing		

=== Hyde Werneth ward ===
Hyde Werneth
Party	Candidate	Votes	%	±%
Labour	Andy Kinsey	1,443	40.57	
Conservative	Ruth Welsh	1,153	32.41	
UKIP	Philip Chadwick	782	21.98	
Green	Melanie Roberts	179	5.03	
Majority		290	8.15	
Turnout		3,557	40	
Labour gain from Conservative		Swing		

=== Longdendale ward ===
Longdendale
Party	Candidate	Votes	%	±%
Labour	Janet Cooper	1,185	42.43	
Conservative	David Tyler	733	26.24	
UKIP	Kevin Misell	635	22.74	
Green	John Kelly	240	8.59	
Majority		452	16.18	
Turnout		2,793	36	
Labour hold		Swing		

=== Mossley ward ===
Mossley
Party	Candidate	Votes	%	±%
Labour Co-op	Frank Travis	1,375	47.04	
Conservative	Amanda Buckley	851	29.11	
Green	Christine Clark	697	23.85	
Majority		524	17.93	
Turnout		2,923	33	
Labour hold		Swing		

=== St Peter's ward ===
St Peter's
Party	Candidate	Votes	%	±%
Labour	Joyce Bowerman	2,059	70.78	
BNP	Bill Kitchen	303	10.42	
Conservative	Gus Rankin	289	9.93	
Green	Trevor Clarke	258	8.87	
Majority		1,756	60.36	
Turnout		2,909	32	
Labour hold		Swing		

=== Stalybridge North ward ===
Stalybridge North
Party	Candidate	Votes	%	±%
Labour	Kevin Welsh	1,125	38.91	
Conservative	Clive Patrick	811	28.05	
UKIP	Angela McManus	758	26.22	
Green	Jean Smee	197	6.81	
Majority		314	10.86	
Turnout		2,891	30	
Labour hold		Swing		

=== Stalybridge South ward ===
Stalybridge South
Party	Candidate	Votes	%	±%
Conservative	Basil Beeley	1,123	41.06	
Labour	Dorothy Cartwright	813	29.73	
UKIP	Colette Barlow	603	22.05	
Green	Mohammed Ramzan	196	7.17	
Majority		310	11.33	
Turnout		2,735	32	
Conservative hold		Swing		
