= 2006 Tameside Metropolitan Borough Council election =

2006 local election in England

Results of the 2006 Tameside Metropolitan Borough Council election

Elections to Tameside Metropolitan Borough Council were held on 4 May 2006. One third of the council was up for election, with each successful candidate to serve a four-year term of office, expiring in 2010. The Labour Party retained overall control of the council.

After the election, the composition of the council was as follows:

Party	Seats	+/-
Labour	44	0
Conservative	8	+1
Liberal Democrats Audenshaw Focus Team	2	-1
Independent	2	0
Labour hold.		

== Ward results ==
=== Ashton Hurst ward ===
Ashton Hurst
Party	Candidate	Votes	%	±%
Conservative	John Kelly	1,196	39.47	
Labour	Pauline Harrison	1,177	38.84	
Liberal Democrats	John Bartley	372	12.28	
Green	Nigel Rolland	285	9.41	
Majority		19	0.63	
Turnout		3,030	35	
Conservative gain from Labour		Swing		

=== Ashton St. Michael's ward ===
Ashton St. Michael's
Party	Candidate	Votes	%	±%
Labour	Andrew Highton	953	42.11	
Conservative	Joseph Schofield	713	31.51	
Liberal Democrats	Paul Daly	378	16.70	
Green	Elizabeth Blyth	219	9.68	
Majority		240	10.61	
Turnout		2,263	28	
Labour hold		Swing		

=== Ashton Waterloo ward ===
Ashton Waterloo
Party	Candidate	Votes	%	±%
Labour Co-op	Lynn Travis	1,257	40.82	
Conservative	Suzanne Ambler	767	24.91	
BNP	Anthony Jones	755	24.52	
Green	Andrew Threlfall	300	9.74	
Majority		490	15.91	
Turnout		3,079	36	
Labour Co-op hold		Swing		

=== Audenshaw ward ===
2006
Party	Candidate	Votes	%	±%
Labour	Colin White	1,102	40.77	
Liberal Democrats	Allison Seabourne	955	35.33	
Conservative	Georgina Greenwood	646	23.90	
Majority		147	5.44	
Turnout		2,703	32	
Labour gain from Liberal Democrats				

=== Denton North East ward ===
Denton North East
Party	Candidate	Votes	%	±%
Labour	Vincent Ricci	1,364	57.41	
Conservative	Anthony Kershaw	1,012	42.59	
Majority		352	14.81	
Turnout		2,376	29	
Labour hold		Swing		

=== Denton South ward ===
Shortly after hearing the result Councillor Arthur Grundy died; he had been suffering from terminal cancer. The seat was retained for Labour a month by Walter Downs later in a by-election.

Denton South
Party	Candidate	Votes	%	±%
Labour	Arthur Grundy	1,443	61.51	
Conservative	Thomas Jones	903	38.49	
Majority		540	23.02	
Turnout		2,346	28	
Labour hold		Swing		

=== Denton West ward ===
Denton West
Party	Candidate	Votes	%	±%
Labour	Michael Smith	1,865	58.78	
Conservative	Joan Howarth	1,308	41.22	
Majority		557	17.55	
Turnout		3,173	35	
Labour hold		Swing		

=== Droylsden East ward ===
Droylsden East
Party	Candidate	Votes	%	±%
Labour Co-op	Susan Quinn	1,396	48.51	
BNP	David Gough	619	21.51	
Conservative	Emlyn Davis	453	15.74	
Local Community Party	Jack Crossfield	410	14.25	
Majority		777	27	
Turnout		2,878	33	
Labour Co-op hold		Swing		

=== Droylsden West ward ===
Droylsden West
Party	Candidate	Votes	%	±%
Labour	Barrie Holland	1,838	61.21	
BNP	Paul Hindley	745	24.81	
Conservative	Charles Fletcher	420	13.99	
Majority		1,093	36.40	
Turnout		3,003	34	
Labour hold		Swing		

=== Dukinfield ward ===
Dukinfield
Party	Candidate	Votes	%	±%
Labour	Jacqueline Lane	1,258	51.64	
Green	Vernon Marshall	678	27.83	
Independent	Fiona Henderson	500	20.53	
Majority		580	23.81	
Turnout		2,436	28	
Labour hold		Swing		

=== Dukinfield / Stalybridge ward ===
Dukinfield / Stalybridge
Party	Candidate	Votes	%	±%
Labour	Mary Eileen	1,271	50.62	
Conservative	Michael Dickinson	1,240	49.38	
Majority		31	1.23	
Turnout		2,511	30	
Labour hold		Swing		

=== Hyde Godley ward ===
Hyde Godley
Party	Candidate	Votes	%	±%
Labour Co-op	James Fitzpatrick	1,322	50.62	
Conservative	Ali Reza	673	49.38	
Majority		31	1.23	
Turnout		2,511	26	
Labour Co-op hold		Swing		

=== Hyde Newton ward ===
Councillor Margaret Oldham died in office in November 2008. The seat was retained by Philip Fitzpatrick for Labour in a by-election in February 2009.

Hyde Newton
Party	Candidate	Votes	%	±%
Labour	Margaret Oldham	1,085	36.94	
BNP	Nigel Byrne	761	25.91	
Conservative	Thomas Welsby	552	18.79	
Liberal Democrats	Peter Ball-Foster	363	12.36	
Green	Michelle Valentine	176	5.99	
Majority		324	11.03	
Turnout		2,937	33	
Labour hold		Swing		

=== Hyde Werneth ward ===
Hyde Werneth
Party	Candidate	Votes	%	±%
Conservative	Ruth Welsby	1,696	54.52	
Labour	Alan Barton	1,415	45.48	
Majority		281	9.03	
Turnout		3,111	37	
Conservative hold		Swing		

=== Longdendale ward ===
Longdendale
Party	Candidate	Votes	%	±%
Labour	Roy Oldham	1,429	51.48	
Conservative	Wendy Ince	915	32.96	
BNP	Beverley Jones	432	15.56	
Majority		514	18.52	
Turnout		2,776	37	
Labour hold		Swing		

=== Mossley ward ===
Mossley
Party	Candidate	Votes	%	±%
Independent	Ann Etchells	1,240	35.2	
Independent	Valerie Carter	1,003		
Labour Co-op	Idu Miah	851	24.1	
Labour	Michael Hill	797		
Conservative	David Buckley	772	21.9	
Green	Christine Clark	661	18.8	
Green	Jacintha Manchester	448		
Majority				
Turnout			38.6	
Independent hold		Swing		
Independent hold		Swing		

=== St Peter's ward ===
St Peter's
Party	Candidate	Votes	%	±%
Labour	Stephen Smith	1,254	52.58	
Liberal Democrats	John Piper	502	21.05	
Conservative	David Afshar	333	13.96	
Green	Stuart Mortimore	296	12.41	
Majority		752	31.53	
Turnout		2,385	28	
Labour hold		Swing		

=== Stalybridge North ward ===
Stalybridge North
Party	Candidate	Votes	%	±%
Labour	Kevin Welsh	1,219	47.84	
Conservative	Terence Shepherd	850	33.36	
Green	Jean Smee	479	18.80	
Majority		369	14.48	
Turnout		2,548	28	
Labour hold		Swing		

=== Stalybridge South ward ===
Stalybridge South
Party	Candidate	Votes	%	±%
Conservative	Basil Beeley	1,392	56.49	
Labour	Bill Fairfoull	610	24.76	
Green	Melanie Roberts	462	18.75	
Majority		782	31.74	
Turnout		2,464	32	
Conservative hold		Swing		
