= Mossley (ward) =

Mossley (Tameside)
- Electoral ward
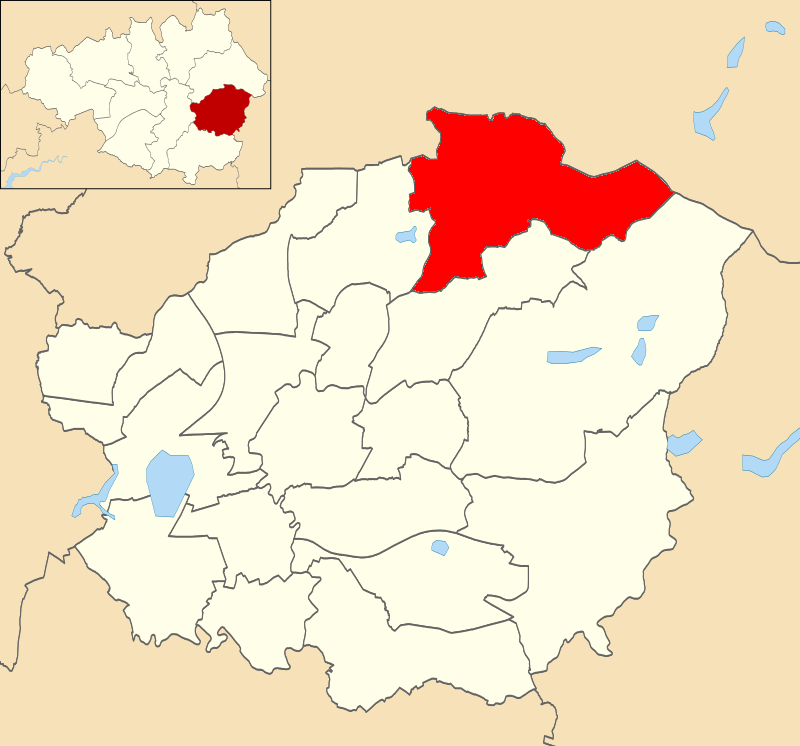
- Mossley within Tameside

- Coat of arms
- Motto: Industry and Integrity
- Interactive map of Mossley (Tameside)
- Coordinates: 53.5164°N 2.0316°W
- Country: United Kingdom
- Constituent country: England
- Region: North West England
- County: Greater Manchester
- Metropolitan borough: Tameside
- Created: 2004
- Named for: Stalybridge and Hyde

Government UK Parliament constituency: Stalybridge and Hyde
  - Type: Unicameral
  - Body: Tameside Metropolitan Borough Council
  - Leader of the Council: Brenda Warrington (Labour)
  - Councillor: Stephen Homer (Labour)
  - Councillor: Tafheen Sharif (Labour)
  - Councillor: Jack Homer (Labour)

Mossley is an electoral ward of Tameside, England. It is represented in Westminster by Jonathan Reynolds Labour Co-operative MP for Stalybridge and Hyde.

== Councillors ==
The ward is represented by three councillors: Stephen Homer (Lab), Tafheen Sharif (Lab), and Jack Homer (Lab).

Election	Councillor	Councillor	Councillor
2004	James Brierley (Lab)	Mike Hill (Ind)	Roy Etchells (Ind)
2006	Ann Etchells (Ind)	Valerie Carter (Ind)	Roy Etchells (Ind)
2007	Ann Etchells (Ind)	Valerie Carter (Ind)	Roy Etchells (Ind)
2008	Ann Etchells (Ind)	Valerie Carter (Ind)	Roy Etchells (Ind)
2010	Paul Dowthwaite (Lab)	Valerie Carter (Ind)	Roy Etchells (Ind)
2011	Paul Dowthwaite (Lab)	Idu Miah (Lab Co-op)	Roy Etchells (Ind)
2012	Paul Dowthwaite (Lab)	Idu Miah (Lab Co-op)	Ellie Shember-Critchley (Lab Co-op)
2014	Frank Travis (Lab Co-op)	Idu Miah (Lab Co-op)	Ellie Shember-Critchley (Lab Co-op)
2015	Frank Travis (Lab Co-op)	Idu Miah (Lab Co-op)	Ellie Shember-Critchley (Lab Co-op)
2016	Frank Travis (Lab Co-op)	Tafheen Sharif (Lab)	Jack Homer (Lab)
2018	Stephen Homer (Lab)	Tafheen Sharif (Lab)	Jack Homer (Lab)

indicates seat up for re-election. indicates seat up for re-election due to the resignation of the incumbent councillor.

== Elections in 2010s ==
=== May 2018 ===
2018
Party	Candidate	Votes	%	±%
Labour	Stephen Homer	1,145		
Mossley Independent Community Party	Lesley Bill	721		
Independent	Dean Aylett	359		
Conservative	Andrew Cooper	319		
Green	Christine Clark	174		
Liberal Democrats	Sally Ashe	86		
Turnout		2,811	32	
Labour hold		Swing		

=== May 2016 ===
2016
Party	Candidate	Votes	%	±%
Labour	Jack Homer	1,140	20.86	
Labour	Tafheen Sharif	784	14.35	
Independent	Lesley Bill	765	14.00	
Independent	Dean Aylett	705	12.90	
Independent	Christine Lyness	647	11.84	
Independent	Claire Hardisty	408	7.47	
Green	Christine Clark	339	6.20	
Conservative	Phil Rogers	321	5.87	
Green	Stuart Bennett	222	4.06	
Liberal Democrats	Martin Kiely	134	2.45	
Majority		356	6.51	
Turnout		5,465	34	
Labour hold		Swing		
Labour hold		Swing		

=== May 2015 ===
2015
Party	Candidate	Votes	%	±%
Labour Co-op	Idu Miah	2,251	43.03	
Independent	Dean Aylett	1,162	22.21	
Conservative	Dominic Johnson	1,042	19.92	
Green	Christine Clark	544	10.40	
Liberal Democrats	Martin Kiely	232	4.44	
Majority		1,089	20.82	
Turnout		5,231	60	
Labour Co-op hold		Swing		

=== May 2014 ===
2014
Party	Candidate	Votes	%	±%
Labour Co-op	Frank Travis	1,375	47.04	
Conservative	Amanda Buckley	851	29.11	
Green	Christine Clark	697	23.85	
Majority		524	17.93	
Turnout		2,923	33	
Labour hold		Swing		

=== May 2012 ===
2012
Party	Candidate	Votes	%	±%
Labour Co-op	Ellie Shember-Critchley	1,258	45.73	+7.73
Independent	Dean Aylett	906	32.93	N/A
Conservative	Dominic Johnson	311	11.30	−10.96
Green	Christine Clark	276	10.03	+0.81
Majority		352	12.80	
Turnout		2,758	32.1	−4.9
Labour Co-op gain from Independent		Swing		

=== May 2011 ===
2011
Party	Candidate	Votes	%	±%
Labour Co-op	Idu Miah	1,779	51.94	
Independent	Valerie Carter	1,115	32.55	
Green	Christine Clark	334	9.75	
UKIP	Emma Misell	197	5.75	
Majority		664	19.39	
Turnout		3,425	40	
Labour Co-op gain from Independent		Swing		

=== May 2010 ===
2010
Party	Candidate	Votes	%	±%
Labour	Paul Dowthwaite	1,918	36.52	
Independent	Ann Etchells	1,602	30.50	
Conservative	Kevin Hartley	1,233	23.48	
Green	Christine Clark	499	9.50	
Majority		316	6.02	
Turnout		5,252	63	
Labour gain from Independent		Swing		

== Elections in 2000s ==
=== May 2008 ===
2008
Party	Candidate	Votes	%	±%
Independent	Roy Etchells	1,133	37.99	
Labour	Idu Miah	910	30.52	
Conservative	Kevin Hartley	664	22.27	
Green	Christine Clark	275	9.22	
Majority		223	7.48	
Turnout		2,982	37	
Independent hold		Swing		

=== May 2007 ===
2007
Party	Candidate	Votes	%	±%
Independent	Valerie Carter	1,267	45.6	
Labour Co-op	Idu Miah	1,036	37.3	
Green	Christine Anne Clark	475	17.1	
Majority		231	8.3	
Turnout		2,778	35.9	
Independent hold		Swing		

=== May 2006 ===
2006
Party	Candidate	Votes	%	±%
Independent	Ann Etchells	1,240	35.2	
Independent	Valerie Carter	1,003		
Labour Co-op	Idu Miah	851	24.1	
Labour	Michael Hill	797		
Conservative	David Buckley	772	21.9	
Green	Christine Clark	661	18.8	
Green	Jacintha Manchester	448		
Majority				
Turnout			38.6	
Independent hold		Swing		
Independent hold		Swing		

=== June 2004 ===
2004
Party	Candidate	Votes	%	±%
Independent	Roy Etchells	1,710	40.1	
Labour	James Brierley	1,390	32.6	
Independent	Michael Hill	1,270		
Independent	William Leeson	1,248		
Labour Co-op	Idu Miah	1,058		
Labour	Lynn Travis	986		
Green	Christine Clark	591	13.9	
Conservative	Alan Swords	576	13.5	
Conservative	Carol Owen	502		
Conservative	Stephen Owen	456		
Majority				
Turnout			44.9	
