= Ashton Hurst =

Ashton Hurst (Tameside)
- Electoral ward
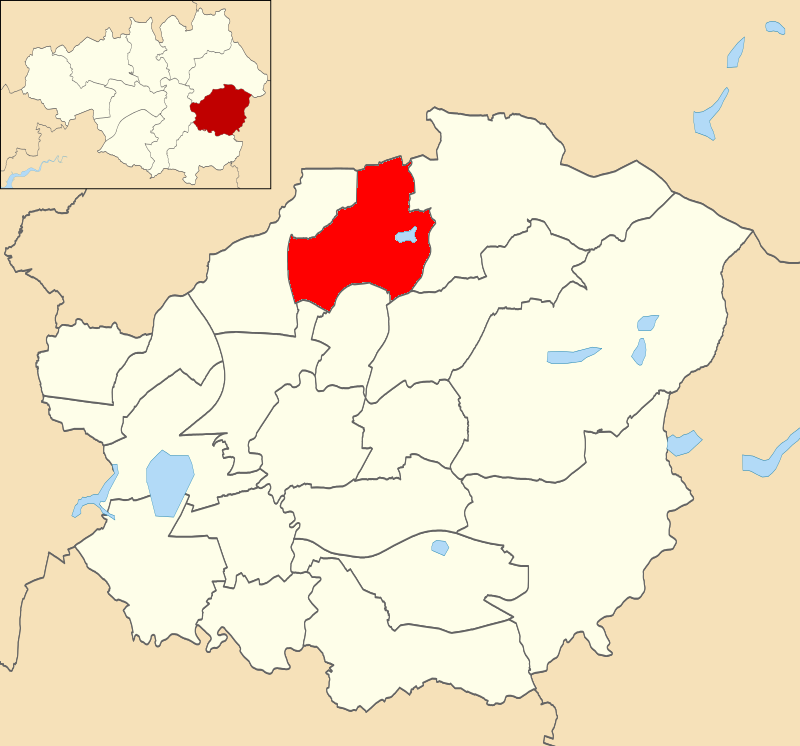
- Ashton Hurst within Tameside

- Coat of arms
- Motto: Industry and Integrity
- Interactive map of Ashton Hurst (Tameside)
- Coordinates: 53.5080°N 2.0749°W
- Country: United Kingdom
- Constituent country: England
- Region: North West England
- County: Greater Manchester
- Metropolitan borough: Tameside
- Created: 2004
- Named after: Ashton-under-Lyne

Government UK Parliament constituency: Ashton-under-Lyne
  - Type: Unicameral
  - Body: Tameside Metropolitan Borough Council
  - Leader of the Council: Eleanor Wills (Labour)
  - Councillor: Keiron Lawrence (Reform UK)
  - Councillor: Mike Glover (Labour)
  - Councillor: Mohammed Karim (Labour)

Area
  - Total: 1.8 sq mi (4.7 km^{2})

Ashton Hurst is an electoral ward of Tameside, England. It is represented in Westminster by Angela Rayner Labour MP for Ashton-under-Lyne.

== Councillors ==
The ward is represented by three councillors (2026): Kieron Lawrence (Ref), Mike Glover (Lab), and Mohammed Karim (Lab).

Election	Councillor	Councillor	Councillor
2004	Pauline Harrison (Lab)	Alan Whitehead (Lab)	Richard Ambler (Con)
2006	John Kelly (Con)	Alan Whitehead (Lab)	Richard Ambler (Con)
2007	John Kelly (Con)	Alan Whitehead (Lab)	Richard Ambler (Con)
2008	John Kelly (Con)	Alan Whitehead (Lab)	Richard Ambler (Con)
2010	Pauline Harrison (Lab)	Alan Whitehead (Lab)	Richard Ambler (Con)
2011	Pauline Harrison (Lab)	Alan Whitehead (Lab)	Richard Ambler (Con)
2012	Pauline Harrison (Lab)	Alan Whitehead (Lab)	Leigh Drennan (Lab)
2014	Paul Buckley (Con)	Alan Whitehead (Lab)	Leigh Drennan (Lab)
2015	Paul Buckley (Con)	Mike Glover (Lab)	Leigh Drennan (Lab)
2016	Paul Buckley (Con)	Mike Glover (Lab)	Leigh Drennan (Lab)
2018	Dolores Lewis (Lab)	Mike Glover (Lab)	Leigh Drennan (Lab)

indicates seat up for re-election.

== Elections in 2010s ==
=== May 2018 ===
2018
Party	Candidate	Votes	%	±%
Labour	Dolores Lewis	1,427		
Conservative	Paul Buckley*	1384		
Green	Philip Blakeney	173		
Turnout		2987	33.6	
Labour gain from Conservative		Swing		

=== May 2016 ===
2016
Party	Candidate	Votes	%	±%
Labour	Leigh Drennan	1,536	47.42	
Conservative	Liam Billington	1,412	43.59	
Green	Nigel Rolland	291	8.98	
Majority		124	3.83	
Turnout		3,239	37	
Labour hold		Swing		

=== May 2015 ===
2015
Party	Candidate	Votes	%	±%
Labour	Mike Glover	2,548	49.19	
Conservative	Liam Billington	2,077	40.10	
Green	Charlotte Hughes	555	10.71	
Majority		471	9.09	
Turnout		5,180	58	
Labour hold		Swing		

=== May 2014 ===
2014
Party	Candidate	Votes	%	±%
Conservative	Paul Buckley	1,377	43.17	
Labour	Debbie Boulton	1,359	42.60	
Green	Charlotte Hughes	436	13.67	
Majority		18	0.56	
Turnout		3,172	36	
Conservative gain from Labour		Swing		

=== May 2012 ===
2012
Party	Candidate	Votes	%	±%
Labour	Leigh Drennan	1,449	49.14	+15.74
Conservative	Richard Ambler*	1,039	35.23	−21.51
UKIP	Lisa Radcliffe	274	9.29	−0.57
Green	Nigel Rolland	187	6.34	N/A
Majority		410	13.90	
Turnout		2,959	33.6	−4.5
Labour gain from Conservative		Swing		

=== May 2011 ===
2011
Party	Candidate	Votes	%	±%
Labour	Alan Whitehead	1,707	52.39	
Conservative	Dave Westhead	1,114	34.19	
Green	Nigel Rolland	237	7.27	
UKIP	Peter Taylor	200	6.14	
Majority		593	18.20	
Turnout		3,258	37	
Labour hold		Swing		

=== May 2010 ===
2010
Party	Candidate	Votes	%	±%
Labour	Pauline Harrison	2,396	46.08	
Conservative	John Kelly	1,930	37.12	
BNP	Karen Lomas	400	7.69	
UKIP	Peter Taylor	241	4.63	
Green	Nigel Rolland	233	4.48	
Majority		466	8.96	
Turnout		5,200	59	
Labour gain from Conservative		Swing		

== Elections in 2000s ==
=== May 2008 ===
2008
Party	Candidate	Votes	%	±%
Conservative	Richard Ambler	1,905	56.75	
Labour	Paul Dowthwaite	1,121	33.39	
UKIP	Paul Littlewood	331	9.86	
Majority		784	23.35	
Turnout		3,357	38	
Conservative hold		Swing		

=== May 2007 ===
2007
Party	Candidate	Votes	%	±%
Labour	Alan Whitehead	1,337	39.8	
Conservative	Kate Scott	1,323	39.4	
BNP	Bev Jones	267	8.0	
Liberal Democrats	Cerudwen Elizabeth Lawe	219	6.5	
Green	Nigel Rolland	124	3.7	
UKIP	Paul Littlewood	86	2.6	
Majority		14	0.4	
Turnout		3,356	38.0	
Labour hold		Swing		

=== May 2006 ===
2006
Party	Candidate	Votes	%	±%
Conservative	John Kelly	1,196	39.47	
Labour	Pauline Harrison	1,177	38.84	
Liberal Democrats	John Bartley	372	12.28	
Green	Nigel Rolland	285	9.41	
Majority		19	0.63	
Turnout		3,030	35	
Conservative gain from Labour		Swing		

=== June 2004 ===
2004
Party	Candidate	Votes	%	±%
Conservative	Richard Ambler	1,487	40.6	
Labour	Alan Whitehead	1,475	40.3	
Labour	Pauline Harrison	1,473		
Conservative	Paul Buckley	1,452		
Conservative	Mary Hastie	1,423		
Labour	Peter Joinson	1,404		
Green	Nigel Rolland	701	19.1	
Majority				
Turnout			40.1	
