= 2004 Tameside Metropolitan Borough Council election =

2004 local election in England

Results of the 2004 Tameside Metropolitan Borough Council election

Elections to Tameside Metropolitan Borough Council were held on 10 June 2004.

Due to demographic changes in the Borough since its formation in 1973, and in common with most other English Councils in 2004, substantial boundary changes were implemented in time for these elections.

After the election, the composition of the council was as follows:

Party	Seats	+/-
Labour	44	
Conservative	7	
Liberal Democrats	3	
Independent	2	
Labour hold.		

== Ward results ==
=== Ashton Hurst ward ===
Ashton Hurst
Party	Candidate	Votes	%	±%
Conservative	Richard Ambler	1,487	40.6	
Labour	Alan Whitehead	1,475	40.3	
Labour	Pauline Harrison	1,473		
Conservative	Paul Buckley	1,452		
Conservative	Mary Hastie	1,423		
Labour	Peter Joinson	1,404		
Green	Nigel Rolland	701	19.1	
Majority				
Turnout			40.1	

=== Ashton St. Michael's ward ===
Ashton St. Michael's
Party	Candidate	Votes	%	±%
Labour	Margaret Sidebottom	1,163	30.3	
Labour	William Harrison	1,161		
Labour	Andrew Highton	1,147		
Conservative	Joseph Schofield	887	23.1	
Conservative	Beryl Bridge	832		
Liberal Democrats	John Bartley	807	21.0	
Green	Bryan Dean	589	15.3	
UKIP	Maurice Jackson	393	10.2	
Majority				
Turnout			33.6	

=== Ashton Waterloo ward ===
Ashton Waterloo
Party	Candidate	Votes	%	±%
Labour	Catherine Piddington	1,588	42.7	
Labour	Michael Whitley	1,403		
Labour	Maria Bailey	1,213		
Conservative	Stephen Hepburn	1,121	30.1	
Conservative	John Marsh	1,064		
Independent	Alexander Mee	1,013	27.2	
Majority				
Turnout			37.2	

=== Audenshaw ward ===
Audenshaw
Party	Candidate	Votes	%	±%
Liberal Democrats	Karen Wright	1,680	45.4	
Liberal Democrats	Peter Wright	1,587		
Liberal Democrats	Allison Seabourne	1,257		
Labour	Patricia Haslam	1,185	32.0	
Labour	Katie Cruickshank	962		
Labour	Colin White	930		
Conservative	Alurie O'Sullivan	834	22.5	
Majority				
Turnout			38.5	

=== Denton North East ward ===
Denton North East
Party	Candidate	Votes	%	±%
Labour	Martin Wareing	1,463	42.3	
Labour	Allison Gwynne	1,441		
Labour	Vincent Ricci	1,291		
Liberal Democrats	Alan Yates	1,012	29.3	
Conservative	Shirley Booth	982	28.4	
Conservative	Georgina Greenwood	967		
Majority				
Turnout			34.9	

=== Denton South ward ===
Denton South
Party	Candidate	Votes	%	±%
Labour	Margaret Downs	1,672	37.1	
Labour	Andrew Doubleday	1,619		
Labour	Arthur Grundy	1,371		
Conservative	Thomas Jones	835	18.5	
Liberal Democrats	Mark Yates	802	17.8	
BNP	Anthony Jones	612	13.6	
Green	Steve Fisher	586	13.0	
Majority				
Turnout			38.0	

=== Denton West ward ===
Denton West
Party	Candidate	Votes	%	±%
Labour	Andrew Gwynne	2,218	47.8	
Labour	Brenda Warrington	1,966		
Labour	Michael Smith	1,751		
Conservative	Joan Howarth	1,272	27.4	
Conservative	Antony Kershaw	1,143		
Conservative	Michael Foy	1,083		
Green	Gerard Boyd	608	13.1	
Liberal Democrats	Carol Yates	545	11.7	
Majority				
Turnout			42.5	

=== Droylsden East ward ===
Droylsden East
Party	Candidate	Votes	%	±%
Labour	Jim Middleton	1,726	40.6	
Labour Co-op	Susan Quinn	1,563	-	
Labour Co-op	Keiran Quinn	1,422	-	
Local Community Party	Jack Crossfield	1,044	24.6	
BNP	David Gough	764	18.0	
Conservative	Lynn Major	714	16.8	
Majority				
Turnout			38.4	

=== Droylsden West ward ===
Droylsden West
Party	Candidate	Votes	%	±%
Labour	Gerald Cooney	2,205	58.0	
Labour	Ann Holland	2,184		
Labour	Barrie Holland	2,078		
Independent	Anthony Affleck	909	23.9	
Conservative	Dorothy Buckley	689	18.1	
Majority				
Turnout			37.7	

=== Dukinfield ward ===
Dukinfield
Party	Candidate	Votes	%	±%
Labour	Brian Wild	1,781	39.0	
Labour	John Taylor	1,661		
Labour	Jacqueline Forth	1,604		
Green	Vernon Marshall	1,032	22.6	
Conservative	Dennis Rick	903	19.8	
Independent	Grethe Dillon	854	18.7	
National Front Britain for the British	Terry Blackman	0	0.00	
Majority				
Turnout			37.0	

=== Dukinfield / Stalybridge ward ===
Dukinfield / Stalybridge
Party	Candidate	Votes	%	±%
Labour	Charles Meredith	1,628	45.3	
Labour	David Sweeton	1,598		
Labour	Philip Wilkinson	1,478		
Conservative	Philip Barker	1,160	32.3	
Conservative	Suzanne Barker	1,123		
Conservative	Andrew Hollingworth	1,081		
Green	Martine Marshall	806	22.4	
Majority				
Turnout			39.4	

=== Hyde Godley ward ===
Hyde Godley
Party	Candidate	Votes	%	±%
Labour	Joseph Kitchen	1,334	45.9	
Labour	John Sullivan	1,257		
Labour Co-op	James Fitzpatrick	1,254		
Conservative	James Walton	897	30.8	
Conservative	John Holt	831		
Conservative	Ali Reza	686		
Liberal Democrats	James Arathoon	678	23.3	
Majority				
Turnout			34.4	

=== Hyde Newton ward ===
Hyde Newton
Party	Candidate	Votes	%	±%
Labour Co-op	Peter Robinson	1,482	34.1	
Labour	Joseph Fitzpatrick	1,363		
Labour	Margaret Oldham	1,296		
Liberal Democrats	Peter Ball-Foster	1,059	24.4	
Conservative	Thomas Welsby	992	22.8	
BNP	Mark Ward	814	18.7	
Majority				
Turnout			37.4	

=== Hyde Werneth ward ===
Hyde Werneth
Party	Candidate	Votes	%	±%
Conservative	Derek Baines	2,031	42.1	
Conservative	John Bell	1,949		
Conservative	Ruth Welsby	1,509		
Labour	Alan Barton	1,364	28.3	
Labour	June Evans	1,310		
Labour	Munsif Ali	1,045		
Independent	Keith Duffy	863	17.9	
Liberal Democrats	Syed Ali	568	11.8	
Majority				
Turnout			46.4	

=== Longdendale ward ===
Longdendale
Party	Candidate	Votes	%	±%
Labour	Sean Parker-Perry	1,661	50.9	
Labour	Peter Bibby	1,641		
Labour	Samuel Roy Oldham	1,499		
Conservative	Wendy Barker	1,085	33.2	
Conservative	Terence Shepherd	1,037		
BNP	Beverley Jones	520	15.9	
Majority				
Turnout			40.4	

=== Mossley ward ===
Mossley
Party	Candidate	Votes	%	±%
Independent	Roy Etchells	1,710	40.1	
Labour	James Brierley	1,390	32.6	
Independent	Michael Hill	1,270		
Independent	William Leeson	1,248		
Labour Co-op	Idu Miah	1,058		
Labour	Lynn Travis	986		
Green	Christine Clark	591	13.9	
Conservative	Alan Swords	576	13.5	
Conservative	Carol Owen	502		
Conservative	Stephen Owen	456		
Majority				
Turnout			44.9	

=== St Peter's ward ===
St Peter's
Party	Candidate	Votes	%	±%
Labour	Warren Bray	1,452	37.7	
Labour	Jack Davis	1,377		
Labour	Stephen Smith	1,332		
Liberal Democrats	Malcolm Lewis	931	24.2	
Green	Trevor Clarke	776	20.1	
Conservative	Charles Fletcher	693	18.0	
Conservative	Irene Marsh	615		
Majority				
Turnout			35.1	

=== Stalybridge North ward ===
Councillor Frank Robinson died in 2006. The seat was retained for Labour by George Roberts in a by-election on 29 June 2006.

Stalybridge North
Party	Candidate	Votes	%	±%
Labour	Bernard Walsh	1,472	45.5	
Labour	Frank Robinson	1,434		
Labour	Kevin Welsh	1,376		
Conservative	David Buckley	1,104	34.2	
Conservative	Yvonne Holt	987		
Conservative	Kevin Hartley	964		
Green	Michael Smee	656	20.3	
Majority			35.1	
Turnout				

=== Stalybridge South ward ===
Stalybridge South
Party	Candidate	Votes	%	±%
Conservative	Doreen Dickinson	1,810	51.3	
Conservative	Colin Grantham	1,619		
Conservative	Suzanne Shepherd	1,617		
Labour	William Fairfoull	1,144	32.4	
Labour	Glennys Hammond	1,092		
Labour	Gary Arthurs	1,021		
BNP	Nigel Byrne	573	16.2	
Majority				
Turnout			39.6	
