= Ashton St. Michael's =

Ashton St. Michael's (Tameside)
- Electoral ward
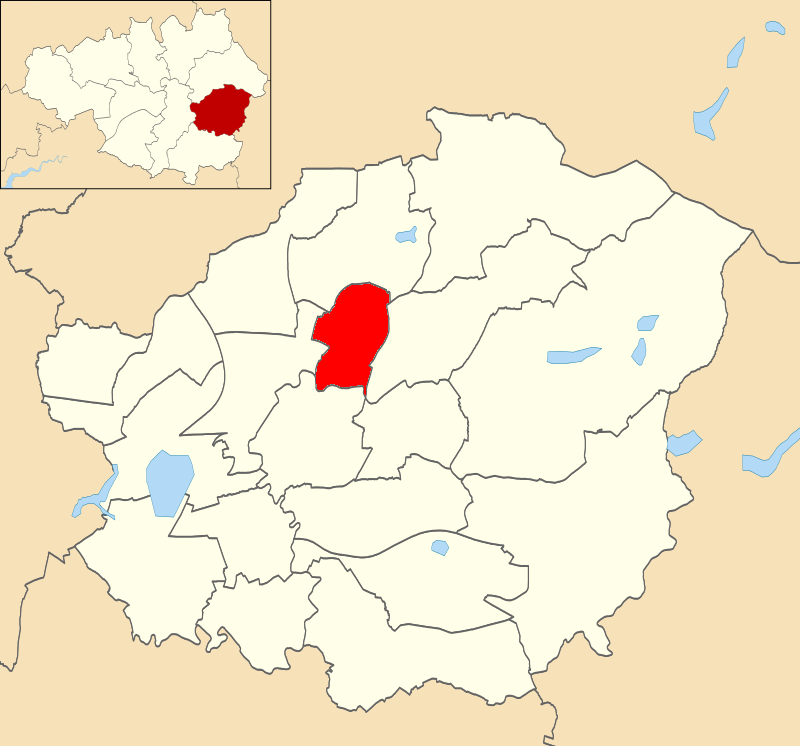
- Ashton St. Michael's within Tameside

- Coat of arms
- Motto: Industry and Integrity
- Interactive map of Ashton St. Michael's (Tameside)
- Coordinates: 53.4914°N 2.0788°W
- Country: United Kingdom
- Constituent country: England
- Region: North West England
- County: Greater Manchester
- Metropolitan borough: Tameside
- Created: 2004
- Named after: Ashton-under-Lyne

Government UK Parliament constituency: Ashton-under-Lyne
  - Type: Unicameral
  - Body: Tameside Metropolitan Borough Council
  - Leader of the Council: Eleanor Wills (Labour)
  - Councillor: Jean Drennan (Labour)
  - Councillor: Andrew McLaren (Labour)
  - Councillor: Danny Carr (Reform UK)

Ashton St Michael's is an electoral ward of Tameside, England. It is represented in Westminster by Angela Rayner Labour MP for Ashton-under-Lyne.

== Councillors ==
The ward is represented by three councillors: Bill Fairfoull (Lab), Yvonne Cartey (Lab), and Margaret Sidebottom (Lab).

Election	Councillor	Councillor	Councillor
2004	Andrew Highton (Lab)	William Harrison (Lab)	Margaret Sidebottom (Lab)
2006	Andrew Highton (Lab)	William Harrison (Lab)	Margaret Sidebottom (Lab)
2007	Andrew Highton (Lab)	William Harrison (Lab)	Margaret Sidebottom (Lab)
2008	Andrew Highton (Lab)	William Harrison (Lab)	Margaret Sidebottom (Lab)
2010	Bill Fairfoull (Lab)	William Harrison (Lab)	Margaret Sidebottom (Lab)
2011	Bill Fairfoull (Lab)	Yvonne Cartey (Lab)	Margaret Sidebottom (Lab)
2012	Bill Fairfoull (Lab)	Yvonne Cartey (Lab)	Margaret Sidebottom (Lab)
2014	Bill Fairfoull (Lab)	Yvonne Cartey (Lab)	Margaret Sidebottom (Lab)
2015	Bill Fairfoull (Lab)	Yvonne Cartey (Lab)	Margaret Sidebottom (Lab)
2016	Bill Fairfoull (Lab)	Yvonne Cartey (Lab)	Margaret Sidebottom (Lab)
2018	Bill Fairfoull (Lab)	Yvonne Cartey (Lab)	Margaret Sidebottom (Lab)

indicates seat up for re-election.

== Elections in 2010s ==
=== May 2018 ===
2018
Party	Candidate	Votes	%	±%
Labour	Bill Fairfoull*	1,396		
Conservative	Dot Buckley	523		
Green	Hannah Smee	210		
Turnout		2139	24	
Labour hold		Swing		

=== May 2016 ===
2016
Party	Candidate	Votes	%	±%
Labour	Margaret Sidebottom	1,714	70.10	
Conservative	Christine Liley	731	29.90	
Majority		983	40.20	
Turnout		2,445	29	
Labour hold		Swing		

=== May 2015 ===
2015
Party	Candidate	Votes	%	±%
Labour	Yvonne Cartey	2,621	57.95	
Conservative	Christine Liley	1,283	28.37	
Green	Nigel Rolland	619	13.69	
Majority		1,338	29.58	
Turnout		4,523	52	
Labour hold		Swing		

=== May 2014 ===
2014
Party	Candidate	Votes	%	±%
Labour	Bill Fairfoull	1,466	57.78	
Conservative	Liam Billington	494	19.47	
Green	Nigel Rolland	426	16.79	
Patriotic Socialist	Mary Doherty	151	5.95	
Majority		972	38.31	
Turnout		2,537	29	
Labour hold		Swing		

=== May 2012 ===
2012
Party	Candidate	Votes	%	±%
Labour	Margaret Sidebottom	1,475	59.79	+21.76
Conservative	Paul Buckley	551	22.33	−15.44
English Democrat	David Timpson	283	11.47	N/A
Green	Rochelle Rolland	158	6.40	+0.78
Majority		924	37.45	
Turnout		2,472	28.5	+0.4
Labour hold		Swing		

=== May 2011 ===
2011
Party	Candidate	Votes	%	±%
Labour	Yvonne Cartey	1,627	56.65	
Conservative	Paul Buckley	716	24.93	
English Democrat	David Timpson	239	8.32	
UKIP	Andy Gee	145	5.05	
Green	Rochelle Rolland	145	5.05	
Majority		911	31.72	
Turnout		2,872	33	
Labour hold		Swing		

=== May 2010 ===
2010
Party	Candidate	Votes	%	±%
Labour	Bill Fairfoull	2,284	50.12	
Conservative	Paul Buckley	1,562	34.28	
UKIP	Andrew Gee	416	9.13	
Green	Rochelle Rolland	295	6.47	
Majority		722	15.84	
Turnout		4,557	54	
Labour hold		Swing		

== Elections in 2000s ==
=== May 2008 ===
2008
Party	Candidate	Votes	%	±%
Labour	Margaret Sidebottom	893	38.03	
Conservative	Paul Buckley	887	37.78	
Liberal Democrats	John Bartley	256	10.90	
UKIP	Richard Harrison	180	7.67	
Green	Rochelle Rolland	132	5.62	
Majority		6	0.26	
Turnout		2,348	28	
Labour hold		Swing		

=== May 2007 ===
2007
Party	Candidate	Votes	%	±%
Labour	Bill Harrison	993	42.4	
Conservative	Joseph Peter Schofield	773	33.0	
Liberal Democrats	Paul Stephen Daly	252	10.8	
Green	Elizabeth Blyth	175	7.5	
UKIP	Richard Harrison	150	6.4	
Majority		220	9.4	
Turnout		2,343	28.8	
Labour hold		Swing		

=== May 2006 ===
2006
Party	Candidate	Votes	%	±%
Labour	Andrew Highton	953	42.11	
Conservative	Joseph Schofield	713	31.51	
Liberal Democrats	Paul Daly	378	16.70	
Green	Elizabeth Blyth	219	9.68	
Majority		240	10.61	
Turnout		2,263	28	
Labour hold		Swing		

=== June 2004 ===
2004
Party	Candidate	Votes	%	±%
Labour	Margaret Sidebottom	1,163	30.3	
Labour	William Harrison	1,161		
Labour	Andrew Highton	1,147		
Conservative	Joseph Schofield	887	23.1	
Conservative	Beryl Bridge	832		
Liberal Democrats	John Bartley	807	21.0	
Green	Bryan Dean	589	15.3	
UKIP	Maurice Jackson	393	10.2	
Majority				
Turnout			33.6	
