= Hyde Werneth =

Hyde Werneth (Tameside)
- Electoral ward
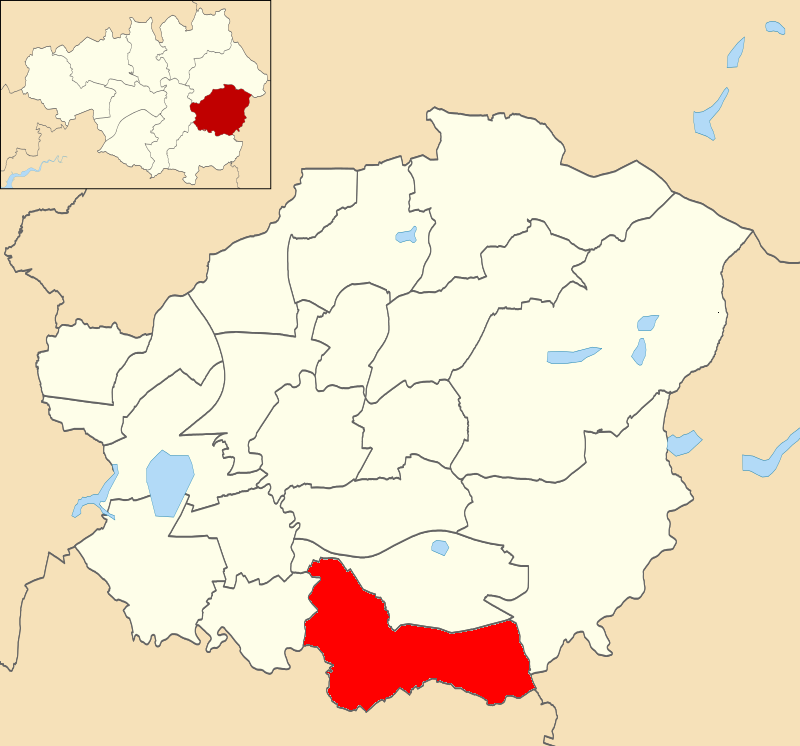
- Hyde Werneth within Tameside

- Coat of arms
- Motto: Industry and Integrity
- Interactive map of Hyde Werneth (Tameside)
- Coordinates: 53.4370°N 2.0637°W
- Country: United Kingdom
- Constituent country: England
- Region: North West England
- County: Greater Manchester
- Metropolitan borough: Tameside
- Created: 2004
- Named after: Stalybridge and Hyde

Government UK Parliament constituency: Stalybridge and Hyde
  - Type: Unicameral
  - Body: Tameside Metropolitan Borough Council
  - Leader of the Council: Brenda Warrington (Labour)
  - Councillor: Phil Chadwick (Conservative)
  - Councillor: John Bell (Conservative)
  - Councillor: Ruth Welsh (Conservative)

Hyde Werneth is an electoral ward of Tameside, England. It is represented in Westminster by Jonathan Reynolds Labour Co-operative MP for Stalybridge and Hyde.

== Councillors ==
The ward is represented by three councillors: Phil Chadwick (Con), John Bell (Con), and Ruth Welsh (Con).

Election	Councillor	Councillor	Councillor
2004	Ruth Welsby (Con)	John Bell (Con)	Derek Baines (Con)
2006	Ruth Welsby (Con)	John Bell (Con)	Derek Baines (Con)
2007	Ruth Welsby (Con)	John Bell (Con)	Derek Baines (Con)
2008	Ruth Welsby (Con)	John Bell (Con)	Derek Baines (Con)
2010	Ruth Welsh (née Welsby) (Con)	John Bell (Con)	Derek Baines (Con)
2011	Ruth Welsh (Con)	John Bell (Con)	Derek Baines (Con)
2012	Ruth Welsh (Con)	John Bell (Con)	Raja Miah (Lab)
2014	Andy Kinsey (Lab)	John Bell (Con)	Raja Miah (Lab)
2015	Andy Kinsey (Lab)	John Bell (Con)	Raja Miah (Lab)
2016	Andy Kinsey (Lab)	John Bell (Con)	Ruth Welsh (Con)
2018	Phil Chadwick (Con)	John Bell (Con)	Ruth Welsh (Con)

indicates seat up for re-election.

== Elections in 2010s ==
=== May 2018 ===
2018
Party	Candidate	Votes	%	±%
Conservative	Phil Chadwick	1,631		
Labour	Andy Kinsey*	1,422		
Green	Nina West	155		
Liberal Democrats	Richard O'Brien	131		
Turnout		3,348	37	
Conservative gain from Labour		Swing		

=== May 2016 ===
2016
Party	Candidate	Votes	%	±%
Conservative	Ruth Welsh	1,771	51.23	
Labour	Raja Miah	1,686	48.77	
Majority		85	2.46	
Turnout		3,457	41	
Conservative gain from Labour		Swing		

=== May 2015 ===
2015
Party	Candidate	Votes	%	±%
Conservative	John Bell	2,754	49.28	
Labour	Debbie Boulton	2,422	43.34	
Green	Jean Smee	412	7.37	
Majority		332	5.94	
Turnout		5,588	64	
Conservative hold		Swing		

=== May 2014 ===
2014
Party	Candidate	Votes	%	±%
Labour	Andy Kinsey	1,443	40.57	
Conservative	Ruth Welsh	1,153	32.41	
UKIP	Philip Chadwick	782	21.98	
Green	Melanie Roberts	179	5.03	
Majority		290	8.15	
Turnout		3,557	40	
Labour gain from Conservative		Swing		

=== May 2012 ===
2012
Party	Candidate	Votes	%	±%
Labour	Raja Miah	1,923	49.79	+14.41
Conservative	Floyd Paterson	1,470	38.06	−13.98
UKIP	Stephanie Misell	243	6.29	−1.11
Green	June Gill	226	5.85	+0.68
Majority		453	11.73	
Turnout		3,870	44	+3
Labour gain from Conservative		Swing		

=== May 2011 ===
2011
Party	Candidate	Votes	%	±%
Conservative	John Bell	1,858	46.16	
Labour	Raja Miah	1,726	42.88	
Green	June Gill	242	6.01	
UKIP	Stephanie Misell	199	4.94	
Majority		132	3.28	
Turnout		4,025	46	
Conservative hold		Swing		

=== May 2010 ===
2010
Party	Candidate	Votes	%	±%
Conservative	Ruth Welsh	2,538	43.64	
Labour	Raja Miah	2,241	38.53	
BNP	John Wimpenny	424	7.29	
UKIP	John Cooke	318	5.47	
Green	June Gill	295	5.07	
Majority		297	5.11	
Turnout		5,816	67	
Conservative hold		Swing		

== Elections in 2000s ==
=== May 2008 ===
2008
Party	Candidate	Votes	%	±%
Conservative	Derek Baines	1,821	52.04	
Labour	Claire Francis	1,238	35.38	
UKIP	John Cooke	259	7.40	
Green	June Gill	181	5.17	
Majority		583	16.66	
Turnout		3,499	41	
Conservative hold		Swing		

=== May 2007 ===
2007
Party	Candidate	Votes	%	±%
Conservative	John Stuart Bell	1,735	49.0	
Labour	Raja Miah	1,285	36.3	
BNP	Rosalind Gauci	286	8.1	
UKIP	John Cooke	235	6.6	
Majority		450	12.7	
Turnout		3,541	42.1	
Conservative hold		Swing		

=== May 2006 ===
2006
Party	Candidate	Votes	%	±%
Conservative	Ruth Welsby	1,696	54.52	
Labour	Alan Barton	1,415	45.48	
Majority		281	9.03	
Turnout		3,111	37	
Conservative hold		Swing		

=== June 2004 ===
2004
Party	Candidate	Votes	%	±%
Conservative	Derek Baines	2,031	42.1	
Conservative	John Bell	1,949		
Conservative	Ruth Welsby	1,509		
Labour	Alan Barton	1,364	28.3	
Labour	June Evans	1,310		
Labour	Munsif Ali	1,045		
Independent	Keith Duffy	863	17.9	
Liberal Democrats	Syed Ali	568	11.8	
Majority				
Turnout			46.4	
