= 2008 Tameside Metropolitan Borough Council election =

2008 UK local government election

Results of the 2008 Tameside Metropolitan Borough Council election

Elections to Tameside Metropolitan Borough Council were held on 1 May 2008. One third of the council was up for election, with each successful candidate to serve a four-year term of office, expiring in 2012. The Labour Party retained overall control of the council.

After the election the composition of the council was:

Party	Seats	±
Labour	44	-1
Conservative	10	+2
Independent	3	0
Liberal Democrat	0	–1

== Ward results ==
=== Ashton Hurst ward ===
Ashton Hurst
Party	Candidate	Votes	%	±%
Conservative	Richard Ambler	1,905	56.75	
Labour	Paul Dowthwaite	1,121	33.39	
UKIP	Paul Littlewood	331	9.86	
Majority		784	23.35	
Turnout		3,357	38	
Conservative hold		Swing		

=== Ashton St. Michael's ward ===
Ashton St. Michael's
Party	Candidate	Votes	%	±%
Labour	Margaret Sidebottom	893	38.03	
Conservative	Paul Buckley	887	37.78	
Liberal Democrats	John Bartley	256	10.90	
UKIP	Richard Harrison	180	7.67	
Green	Rochelle Rolland	132	5.62	
Majority		6	0.26	
Turnout		2,348	28	
Labour hold		Swing		

=== Ashton Waterloo ward ===
Ashton Waterloo
Party	Candidate	Votes	%	±%
Labour	Catherine Piddington	1,152	40.52	
Conservative	Dot Buckley	864	30.39	
BNP	Anthony Jones	473	16.64	
Liberal Democrats	Paul Daly	230	8.09	
Green	Nigel Rolland	124	4.36	
Majority		288	10.13	
Turnout		2,843	34	
Labour hold		Swing		

=== Audenshaw ward ===
Audenshaw
Party	Candidate	Votes	%	±%
Labour	Jean Brazil	1,292	41.00	
Conservative	Stacey Knighton	1,013	32.15	
BNP	David Gough	846	26.85	
Majority		279	8.85	
Turnout		3,151	37	
Labour gain from Liberal Democrats		Swing		

=== Denton North East ward ===
Denton North East
Party	Candidate	Votes	%	±%
Labour	Martin Wareing	1,139	45.45	
Conservative	Georgina Greenwood	912	36.39	
Liberal Democrats	Shaun O'Rourke	455	18.16	
Majority		227	9.06	
Turnout		2,506	30	
Labour hold		Swing		

=== Denton South ward ===
Denton South
Party	Candidate	Votes	%	±%
Labour	Margaret Downs	1,421	57.53	
Conservative	Thomas Jones	1,049	42.47	
Majority		372	15.06	
Turnout		2,470	30	
Labour hold		Swing		

=== Denton West ward ===
Denton West
Party	Candidate	Votes	%	±%
Labour	Dawson Lane	1,578	50.21	
Conservative	Joan Howarth	1,565	49.79	
Majority		13	0.41	
Turnout		3,143	35	
Labour hold		Swing		

=== Droylsden East ward ===
Droylsden East
Party	Candidate	Votes	%	±%
Labour	Jim Middleton	1,408	46.07	
BNP	David Lomas	1,000	32.72	
Conservative	Lee Robinson	648	21.20	
Majority		408	13.35	
Turnout		3,056	35	
Labour hold		Swing		

=== Droylsden West ward ===
Droylsden West
Party	Candidate	Votes	%	±%
Labour	Gerald Cooney	1,779	58.58	
Conservative	Gillian Westhead	657	21.63	
BNP	Paul Hindley	601	19.79	
Majority		1,122	36.94	
Turnout		3,037	35	
Labour hold		Swing		

=== Dukinfield ward ===
Dukinfield
Party	Candidate	Votes	%	±%
Labour	Brian Wild	1,266	44.70	
BNP	Roy West	734	25.92	
Conservative	Lynn Major	582	20.55	
Green	Martine Marshall	250	8.83	
Majority		532	18.79	
Turnout		2,832	32	
Labour hold		Swing		

=== Dukinfield / Stalybridge ward ===
Dorothy Cartwright defected from the Conservative Party to the Labour Party in December 2010.

Dukinfield / Stalybridge
Party	Candidate	Votes	%	±%
Conservative	Dorothy Cartwright	1,288	44.23	
Labour	Michael Ballagher	1,022	35.10	
BNP	Jeffrey Clayton	366	12.57	
Green	Michael Smee	236	8.10	
Majority		266	9.13	
Turnout		2,912	34	
Labour gain from Conservative		Swing		

=== Hyde Godley ward ===
Hyde Godley
Party	Candidate	Votes	%	±%
Labour	Joe Kitchen	1,026	42.31	
Conservative	Thomas Welsby	733	30.23	
BNP	Rosalind Gauci	293	12.08	
Liberal Democrats	Jennifer Ball-Foster	264	10.89	
UKIP	Duran O'Dwyer	109	4.49	
Majority		293	12.08	
Turnout		2,425	30	
Labour hold		Swing		

=== Hyde Newton ward ===
Hyde Newton
Party	Candidate	Votes	%	±%
Labour Co-op	Peter Robinson	1,124	36.52	
BNP	Nigel Byrne	846	27.49	
Conservative	John Welsh	732	23.78	
Liberal Democrats	Peter Ball-Foster	376	12.22	
Majority		278	9.03	
Turnout		3,078	33	
Labour Co-op hold		Swing		

=== Hyde Werneth ward ===
Hyde Werneth
Party	Candidate	Votes	%	±%
Conservative	Derek Baines	1,821	52.04	
Labour	Claire Francis	1,238	35.38	
UKIP	John Cooke	259	7.40	
Green	June Gill	181	5.17	
Majority		583	16.66	
Turnout		3,499	41	
Conservative hold		Swing		

=== Longdendale ward ===
Longdendale
Party	Candidate	Votes	%	±%
Labour Co-op	Sean Parker-Perry	1,316	45.57	
Conservative	Sue Barker	1,057	36.60	
Green	Ruth Bergan	312	10.80	
UKIP	Kevin Misell	203	7.03	
Majority		259	8.97	
Turnout		2,888	38	
Labour Co-op hold		Swing		

=== Mossley ward ===
Mossley
Party	Candidate	Votes	%	±%
Independent	Roy Etchells	1,133	37.99	
Labour	Idu Miah	910	30.52	
Conservative	Kevin Hartley	664	22.27	
Green	Christine Clark	275	9.22	
Majority		223	7.48	
Turnout		2,982	37	
Independent hold		Swing		

=== St Peter's ward ===
St Peter's
Party	Candidate	Votes	%	±%
Labour	Warren Bray	1,265	52.51	
Conservative	Dorothy Ward	570	23.66	
Liberal Democrats	Ian Dunlop	313	12.99	
Green	Trevor Clarke	261	10.83	
Majority		695	28.85	
Turnout		2,409	28	
Labour hold		Swing		

=== Stalybridge North ward ===
Stalybridge North
Party	Candidate	Votes	%	±%
Conservative	Clive Patrick	1,159	42.70	
Labour	Bernard Walsh	1,115	41.08	
Green	Jean Smee	250	9.21	
UKIP	Tracy Radcliffe	190	7.00	
Majority		44	1.62	
Turnout		2,714	30	
Conservative gain from Labour		Swing		

=== Stalybridge South ward ===
Stalybridge South
Party	Candidate	Votes	%	±%
Conservative	Doreen Dickinson	1,771	63.82	
Labour	Pauline Harrison	596	21.48	
Green	Melanie Roberts	217	7.82	
UKIP	Angela McManus	191	6.88	
Majority		1,175	42.34	
Turnout		2,775	33	
Conservative hold		Swing		
