= List of electoral wards in Greater Manchester =

This is a list of electoral divisions and wards in the ceremonial county of Greater Manchester in North West England. All changes since the re-organisation of local government following the passing of the Local Government Act 1972 are shown. The number of councillors elected for each electoral division or ward is shown in brackets.

== District councils ==
=== Bolton ===
Wards from 1 April 1974 (first election 10 May 1973) to 1 May 1980:

Wards from 1 May 1980 to 10 June 2004:

Wards from 10 June 2004 to 4 May 2023:

1. Astley Bridge (3)
2. Bradshaw (3)
3. Breightmet (3)
4. Bromley Cross (3)
5. Crompton (3)
6. Farnworth (3)
7. Great Lever (3)
8. Halliwell (3)
9. Harper Green (3)
10. Heaton & Lostock (3)
11. Horwich & Blackrod (3)
12. Horwich North East (3)
13. Hulton (3)
14. Kearsley (3)
15. Little Lever & Darcy Lever (3)
16. Rumworth (3)
17. Smithills (3)
18. Tonge with the Haulgh (3)
19. Westhoughton North & Chew Moor (3)
20. Westhoughton South (3)

Wards from 4 May 2023 to present:

1. Astley Bridge (3)
2. Bradshaw (3)
3. Breightmet (3)
4. Bromley Cross (3)
5. Farnworth North (3)
6. Farnworth South (3)
7. Great Lever (3)
8. Halliwell (3)
9. Heaton, Lostock & Chew Moor (3)
10. Horwich North (3)
11. Horwich South & Blackrod (3)
12. Hulton (3)
13. Kearsley (3)
14. Little Lever & Darcy Lever (3)
15. Queens Park & Central (3)
16. Rumworth (3)
17. Smithills (3)
18. Tonge with the Haulgh (3)
19. Westhoughton North & Hunger Hill (3)
20. Westhoughton South (3)

=== Bury ===
Wards from 1 April 1974 (first election 10 May 1973) to 3 May 1979:

Wards from 3 May 1979 to 10 June 2004:

Wards from 10 June 2004 to 5 May 2022:

1. Besses (3)
2. Church (3)
3. East (3)
4. Elton (3)
5. Holyrood (3)
6. Moorside (3)
7. North Manor (3)
8. Pilkington Park (3)
9. Radcliffe East (3)
10. Radcliffe North (3)
11. Radcliffe West (3)
12. Ramsbottom (3)
13. Redvales (3)
14. St Mary's (3)
15. Sedgley (3)
16. Tottington (3)
17. Unsworth (3)

Wards from 5 May 2022 to present:

1. Besses (3)
2. Bury East (3)
3. Bury West (3)
4. Elton (3)
5. Holyrood (3)
6. Moorside (3)
7. North Manor (3)
8. Pilkington Park (3)
9. Radcliffe East (3)
10. Radcliffe North & Ainsworth (3)
11. Radcliffe West (3)
12. Ramsbottom (3)
13. Redvales (3)
14. Sedgley (3)
15. St. Mary's (3)
16. Tottington (3)
17. Unsworth (3)

=== Manchester ===
Wards from 1 April 1974 (first election 10 May 1973) to 6 May 1982:

Wards from 6 May 1982 to 10 June 2004:

Wards from 10 June 2004 to 2 May 2018:

Wards from 3 May 2018 onwards:

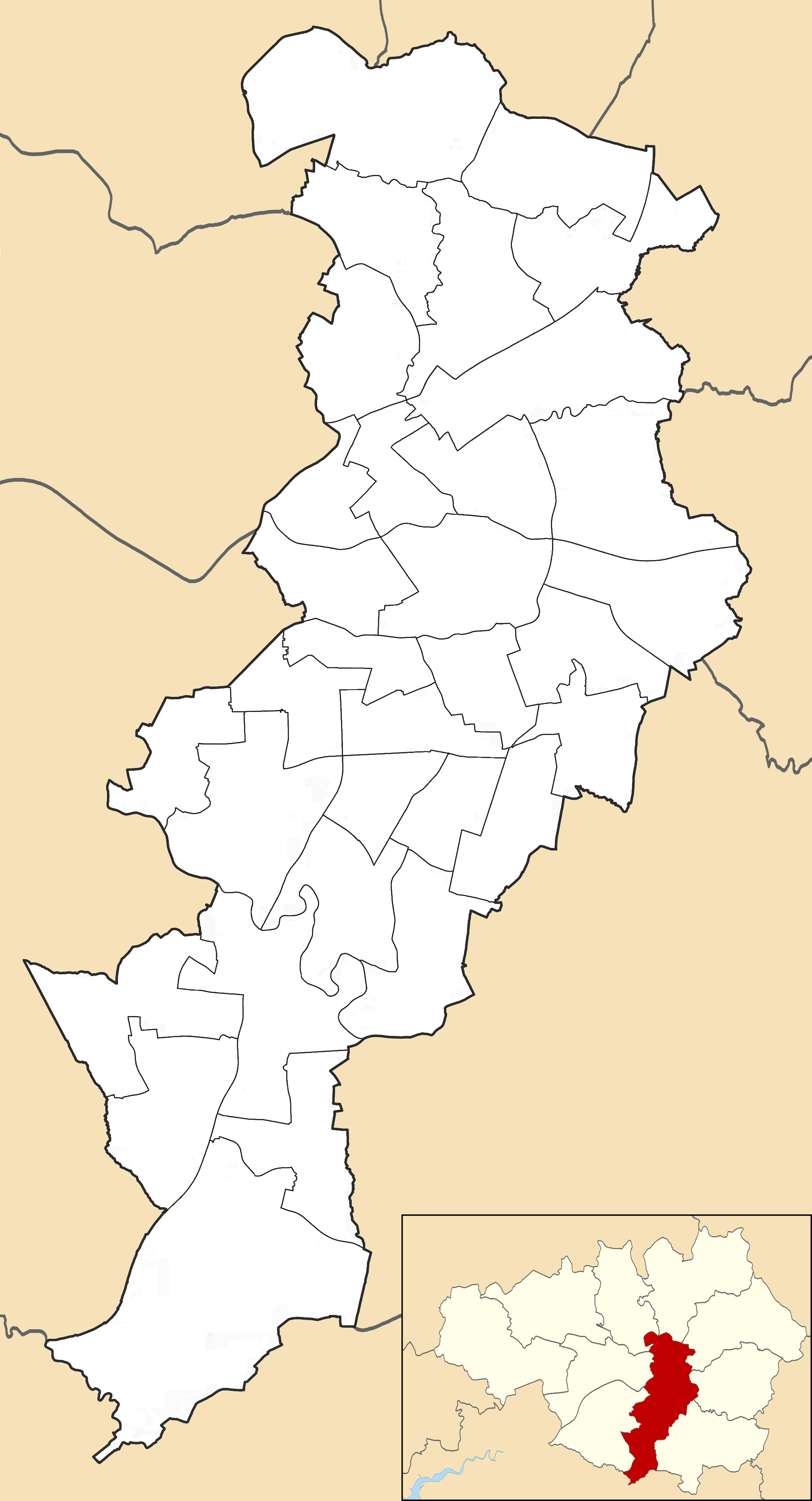

1. Ancoats and Beswick (3)
2. Ardwick (3)
3. Baguley (3)
4. Brooklands (Manchester) (3)
5. Burnage (3)
6. Charlestown (3)
7. Cheetham (3)
8. Chorlton (3)
9. Chorlton Park (3)
10. Clayton and Openshaw (3)
11. Crumpsall (3)
12. Deansgate (3)
13. Didsbury East (3)
14. Didsbury West (3)
15. Fallowfield (3)
16. Gorton and Abbey Hey (3)
17. Harpurhey (3)
18. Higher Blackley (3)
19. Hulme (3)
20. Levenshulme (3)
21. Longsight (3)
22. Miles Platting & Newton Heath (3)
23. Moss Side (3)
24. Moston (3)
25. Northenden (3)
26. Old Moat (3)
27. Piccadilly (3)
28. Rusholme (3)
29. Sharston (3)
30. Whalley Range (3)
31. Withington (3)
32. Woodhouse Park (3)

=== Oldham ===
Wards from 1 April 1974 (first election 10 May 1973) to 3 May 1979:

Wards from 3 May 1979 to 10 June 2004:

Wards from 10 June 2004 to 4 May 2023:

1. Alexandra (3)
2. Chadderton Central (3)
3. Chadderton North (3)
4. Chadderton South (3)
5. Coldhurst (3)
6. Crompton (3)
7. Failsworth East (3)
8. Failsworth West (3)
9. Hollinwood (3)
10. Medlock Vale (3)
11. Royton North (3)
12. Royton South (3)
13. Saddleworth North (3)
14. Saddleworth South (3)
15. Saddleworth West & Lees (3)
16. St James' (3)
17. St Mary's (3)
18. Shaw (3)
19. Waterhead (3)
20. Werneth (3)

Wards from 4 May 2023 to present:

1. Alexandra (3)
2. Chadderton Central (3)
3. Chadderton North (3)
4. Chadderton South (3)
5. Coldhurst (3)
6. Crompton (3)
7. Failsworth East (3)
8. Failsworth West (3)
9. Hollinwood (3)
10. Medlock Vale (3)
11. Royton North (3)
12. Royton South (3)
13. Saddleworth North (3)
14. Saddleworth South (3)
15. Saddleworth West & Lees (3)
16. Shaw (3)
17. St James’ (3)
18. St Mary’s (3)
19. Waterhead (3)
20. Werneth (3)

=== Rochdale ===
Wards from 1 April 1974 (first election 10 May 1973) to 1 May 1980:

Wards from 1 May 1980 to 10 June 2004:

Wards from 10 June 2004 to 5 May 2022:

1. Balderstone & Kirkholt (3)
2. Bamford (3)
3. Castleton (3)
4. Central Rochdale (3)
5. East Middleton (3)
6. Healey (3)
7. Hopwood Hall (3)
8. Kingsway (3)
9. Littleborough Lakeside (3)
10. Milkstone & Deeplish (3)
11. Milnrow & Newhey (3)
12. Norden (3)
13. North Heywood (3)
14. North Middleton (3)
15. Smallbridge & Firgrove (3)
16. South Middleton (3)
17. Spotland & Falinge (3)
18. Wardle & West Littleborough (3)
19. West Heywood (3)
20. West Middleton (3)

Wards from 5 May 2022 to present:

1. Balderstone & Kirkholt (3)
2. Bamford (3)
3. Castleton (3)
4. Central Rochdale (3)
5. East Middleton (3)
6. Healey (3)
7. Hopwood Hall (3)
8. Kingsway (3)
9. Littleborough Lakeside (3)
10. Milkstone & Deeplish (3)
11. Milnrow & Newhey (3)
12. Norden (3)
13. North Heywood (3)
14. North Middleton (3)
15. Smallbridge & Firgrove (3)
16. South Middleton (3)
17. Spotland & Falinge (3)
18. Wardle, Shore & West Littleborough (3)
19. West Heywood (3)
20. West Middleton (3)

=== Salford ===
Wards from 1 April 1974 (first election 10 May 1973) to 6 May 1982:

Wards from 6 May 1982 to 10 June 2004:

Wards from 10 June 2004 to 6 May 2021:

1. Barton (3)
2. Boothstown and Ellenbrook (3)
3. Broughton (3)
4. Cadishead (3)
5. Claremont (3)
6. Eccles (3)
7. Irlam (3)
8. Irwell Riverside (3)
9. Kersal (3)
10. Langworthy (3)
11. Little Hulton (3)
12. Ordsall (3)
13. Pendlebury (3)
14. Swinton North (3)
15. Swinton South (3)
16. Walkden North (3)
17. Walkden South (3)
18. Weaste and Seedley (3)
19. Winton (3)
20. Worsley (3)

Wards from 6 May 2021 to present:

1. Barnton and Winton (3)
2. Blackfriars and Trinity (3)
3. Boothstown and Ellenbrook (3)
4. Broughton (3)
5. Cadishead and Lower Irlam (3)
6. Claremont (3)
7. Eccles (3)
8. Higher Irlam and Peel Green (3)
9. Kersal and Broughton Park (3)
10. Little Hulton (3)
11. Ordsall (3)
12. Pendlebury and Clifton (3)
13. Pendleton and Charlestown (3)
14. Quays (3)
15. Swinton and Wardley (3)
16. Swinton Park (3)
17. Walkden North (3)
18. Walkden South (3)
19. Weaste and Seedley (3)
20. Worsley and Westwood Park (3)

=== Stockport ===
Wards from 1 April 1974 (first election 10 May 1973) to 1 May 1980:

Wards from 1 May 1980 to 10 June 2004:

Wards from 10 June 2004 to 4 May 2023:

1. Bramhall North (3)
2. Bramhall South (3); renamed Bramhall South & Woodford in 2014
3. Bredbury & Woodley (3)
4. Bredbury Green & Romiley (3)
5. Brinnington & Central (3)
6. Cheadle & Gatley (3)
7. Cheadle Hulme North (3)
8. Cheadle Hulme South (3)
9. Davenport & Cale Green (3)
10. Edgeley & Cheadle Heath (3)
11. Hazel Grove (3)
12. Heald Green (3)
13. Heatons North (3)
14. Heatons South (3)
15. Manor (3)
16. Marple North (3)
17. Marple South (3); renamed Marple South & High Lane in 2017
18. Offerton (3)
19. Reddish North (3)
20. Reddish South (3)
21. Stepping Hill (3)

Wards from 4 May 2023 to present:

1. Bramhall North (3)
2. Bramhall South & Woodford (3)
3. Bredbury & Woodley (3)
4. Bredbury Green & Romiley (3)
5. Brinnington & Stockport Central (3)
6. Cheadle East & Cheadle Hulme North (3)
7. Cheadle Hulme South (3)
8. Cheadle West & Gatley (3)
9. Davenport & Cale Green (3)
10. Edgeley (3)
11. Hazel Grove (3)
12. Heald Green (3)
13. Heatons North (3)
14. Heatons South (3)
15. Manor (3)
16. Marple North (3)
17. Marple South & High Lane (3)
18. Norbury & Woodsmoor (3)
19. Offerton (3)
20. Reddish North (3)
21. Reddish South (3)

=== Tameside ===
Wards from 1 April 1974 (first election 10 May 1973) to 1 May 1980:

Wards from 1 May 1980 to 10 June 2004:

Wards from 10 June 2004 to 4 May 2023:

1. Ashton Hurst (3)
2. Ashton St. Michael's (3)
3. Ashton Waterloo (3)
4. Audenshaw (3)
5. Denton North East (3)
6. Denton South (3)
7. Denton West (3)
8. Droylsden East (3)
9. Droylsden West (3)
10. Dukinfield (3)
11. Dukinfield / Stalybridge (3)
12. Hyde Godley (3)
13. Hyde Newton (3)
14. Hyde Werneth (3)
15. Longdendale (3)
16. Mossley (3)
17. St Peter's (3)
18. Stalybridge North (3)
19. Stalybridge South (3)

Wards from 4 May 2023 to present:

1. Ashton Hurst (3)
2. Ashton St Michael’s (3)
3. Ashton Waterloo (3)
4. Audenshaw (3)
5. Denton North East (3)
6. Denton South (3)
7. Denton West (3)
8. Droylsden East (3)
9. Droylsden West (3)
10. Dukinfield (3)
11. Dukinfield Stalybridge (3)
12. Hyde Godley (3)
13. Hyde Newton (3)
14. Hyde Werneth (3)
15. Longdendale (3)
16. Mossley (3)
17. St Peter’s (3)
18. Stalybridge North (3)
19. Stalybridge South (3)

=== Trafford ===
Wards from 1 April 1974 (first election 10 May 1973) to 1 May 1980:

Wards from 1 May 1980 to 10 June 2004:

Wards from 10 June 2004 to 4 May 2023:

1. Altrincham (3)
2. Ashton upon Mersey (3)
3. Bowdon (3)
4. Broadheath (3)
5. Brooklands (3)
6. Bucklow-St. Martins (3)
7. Clifford (3)
8. Davyhulme East (3)
9. Davyhulme West (3)
10. Flixton (3)
11. Gorse Hill (3)
12. Hale Barns (3)
13. Hale Central (3)
14. Longford (3)
15. Priory (3)
16. Sale Moor (3)
17. St. Mary's (3)
18. Stretford (3)
19. Timperley (3)
20. Urmston (3)
21. Village (3)

Wards from 4 May 2023 to present:

1. Altrincham (3)
2. Ashton upon Mersey (3)
3. Bowdon (3)
4. Broadheath (3)
5. Brooklands (3)
6. Bucklow-St Martins (3)
7. Davyhulme (3)
8. Flixton (3)
9. Gorse Hill & Cornbrook (3)
10. Hale (3)
11. Hale Barns & Timperley South (3)
12. Longford (3)
13. Lostock & Barton (3)
14. Manor (3)
15. Old Trafford (3)
16. Sale Central (3)
17. Sale Moor (3)
18. Stretford & Humphrey Park (3)
19. Timperley Central (3)
20. Timperley North (3)
21. Urmston (3)

=== Wigan ===
Wards from 1 April 1974 (first election 10 May 1973) to 1 May 1980:

Wards from 1 May 1980 to 10 June 2004:

Wards from 10 June 2004 to 4 May 2023:

1. Abram (3)
2. Ashton (3)
3. Aspull, New Springs and Whelley (3)
4. Astley Mosley Common (3)
5. Atherleigh (3)
6. Atherton (3)
7. Bryn (3)
8. Douglas (3)
9. Golborne and Lowton West (3)
10. Hindley (3)
11. Hindley Green (3)
12. Ince (3)
13. Leigh East (3)
14. Leigh South (3)
15. Leigh West (3)
16. Lowton East (3)
17. Orrell (3)
18. Pemberton (3)
19. Shevington with Lower Ground (3)
20. Standish with Langtree (3)
21. Tyldesley (3)
22. Wigan Central (3)
23. Wigan West (3)
24. Winstanley (3)
25. Worsley Mesnes (3)

Wards from 4 May 2023 to present:

1. Abram (3)
2. Ashton-in-Makerfield South (3)
3. Aspull, New Springs & Whelley (3)
4. Astley (3)
5. Atherton North (3)
6. Atherton South & Lilford (3)
7. Bryn with Ashton-in-Makerfield North (3)
8. Douglas (3)
9. Golborne & Lowton West (3)
10. Hindley (3)
11. Hindley Green (3)
12. Ince (3)
13. Leigh Central & Higher Folds (3)
14. Leigh South (3)
15. Leigh West (3)
16. Lowton East (3)
17. Orrell (3)
18. Pemberton (3)
19. Shevington with Lower Ground & Moor (3)
20. Standish with Langtree (3)
21. Tyldesley & Mosley Common (3)
22. Wigan Central (3)
23. Wigan West (3)
24. Winstanley (3)
25. Worsley Mesnes (3)

== Former county council ==
=== Greater Manchester ===
Electoral Divisions from 1 April 1974 (first election 12 April 1973) to 1 April 1986 (county council abolished):

1. Altrincham No. 1 (1)
2. Altrincham No. 2 (1)
3. Ashton-in-Makerfield (1)
4. Ashton-under-Lyne No. 1 (1)
5. Ashton-under-Lyne No. 2 (1)
6. Atherton (1)
7. Audenshaw (1)
8. Bolton No. 1 (1)
9. Bolton No. 2 (1)
10. Bolton No. 3 (1)
11. Bolton No. 4 (1)
12. Bolton No. 5 (1)
13. Bredbury & Romiley (1)
14. Bury No. 1 (1)
15. Bury No. 2 (1)
16. Chadderton (1)
17. Cheadle & Gatley No. 1 (1)
18. Cheadle & Gatley No. 2 (1)
19. Crompton (1)
20. Denton (1)
21. Droylsden (1)
22. Dukinfield (1)
23. Eccles (Eccles) (1)
24. Eccles (Patricroft) (1)
25. Failsworth (1)
26. Farnworth (1)
27. Golborne (1)
28. Hale (1)
29. Hazel Grove & Bramhall No. 1 (1)
30. Hazel Grove & Bramhall No. 2 (1)
31. Heywood (1)
32. Hindley (1)
33. Horwich (1)
34. Hyde No. 1 (1)
35. Hyde No. 2 (1)
36. Ince-in-Makerfield (1)
37. Irlam (1)
38. Kearsley (1)
39. Leigh East (1)
40. Leigh West (1)
41. Manchester No. 1 (1)
42. Manchester No. 2 (1)
43. Manchester No. 3 (1)
44. Manchester No. 4 (1)
45. Manchester No. 5 (1)
46. Manchester No. 6 (1)
47. Manchester No. 7 (1)
48. Manchester No. 8 (1)
49. Manchester No. 9 (1)
50. Manchester No. 10 (1)
51. Manchester No. 11 (1)
52. Manchester No. 12 (1)
53. Manchester No. 13 (1)
54. Manchester No. 14 (1)
55. Manchester No. 15 (1)
56. Manchester No. 16 (1)
57. Manchester No. 17 (1)
58. Manchester No. 18 (1)
59. Manchester No. 19 (1)
60. Manchester No. 20 (1)
61. Marple (1)
62. Middleton North West (1)
63. Middleton South East (1)
64. Oldham No. 1 (1)
65. Oldham No. 2 (1)
66. Oldham No. 3 (1)
67. Oldham No. 4 (1)
68. Orrell (1)
69. Pendlebury (1)
70. Prestwich (1)
71. Radcliffe (1)
72. Ramsbottom & Tottington (1)
73. Rochdale No. 1 (1)
74. Rochdale No. 2 (1)
75. Rochdale No. 3 (1)
76. Rochdale No. 4 (1)
77. Royton (1)
78. Saddleworth (1)
79. Sale No. 1 (1)
80. Sale No. 2 (1)
81. Salford No. 1 (1)
82. Salford No. 2 (1)
83. Salford No. 3 (1)
84. Salford No. 4 (1)
85. Salford No. 5 (1)
86. Stalybridge (1)
87. Standish-with-Langtree (1)
88. Stockport No. 1 (1)
89. Stockport No. 2 (1)
90. Stockport No. 3 (1)
91. Stockport No. 4 (1)
92. Stockport No. 5 (1)
93. Stretford (Old Trafford) (1)
94. Stretford (Stretford) (1)
95. Swinton (1)
96. Turton (1)
97. Tyldesley (1)
98. Urmston No. 1 (1)
99. Urmston No. 2 (1)
100. Westhoughton (1)
101. Whitefield (1)
102. Wigan (3)
103. Worsley No. 1 (1)
104. Worsley No. 2 (1)

Electoral Divisions due from 2 May 1985 (order revoked by the Local Government Act 1985):

1. Altrincham & Timperley (1)
2. Ancoats & Cheetham (1)
3. Ashton East & Mossley (1)
4. Ashton West (1)
5. Astley Bridge & Halliwell (1)
6. Atherton & Tyldesley (1)
7. Audenshaw & Denton North East (1)
8. Baguley & Benchill (1)
9. Barlow Moor & Old Moat (1)
10. Blackfriars (1)
11. Blackley & Charlestown (1)
12. Bowdon & Hale (1)
13. Bradshaw & Bromley Cross (1)
14. Bramhall (1)
15. Bramhall Park (1)
16. Bredbury (1)
17. Brooklands & Northenden (1)
18. Broughton (1)
19. Bucklow & St Martins (1)
20. Burnage & Ladybarn (1)
21. Burnden & Little Lever (1)
22. Bury East (1)
23. Bury North (1)
24. Bury South (1)
25. Bury West (1)
26. Cadishead & Irlam (1)
27. Central & Derby (1)
28. Central (1)
29. Central, Beswick & Openshaw (1)
30. Chadderton (1)
31. Cheadle East (1)
32. Cheadle West (1)
33. Chorlton-on-Medlock & Hulme (1)
34. Clayton & Newton Heath (1)
35. Crompton (1)
36. Crumpsall & Harpurhey (1)
37. Davyhulme (1)
38. Denton South & West (1)
39. Didsbury & Withington (1)
40. Droylesden (1)
41. Dukinfield (1)
42. Failsworth (1)
43. Farnworth (1)
44. Featherstall (1)
45. Glodwick (1)
46. Gorton (1)
47. Harper Green & Daubhill (1)
48. Hazel Grove (1)
49. Heathbank (1)
50. Heatons (1)
51. Heywood (1)
52. Hindley (1)
53. Hollins (1)
54. Horwich & Blackrod (1)
55. Hulton (1)
56. Hyde East (1)
57. Hyde West (1)
58. Ince (1)
59. Leigh (1)
60. Levenshulme & Fallowfield (1)
61. Lightbowne & Moston (1)
62. Littleborough & Milnrow (1)
63. Longsight & Victoria Park (1)
64. Lowton with Hope Carr (1)
65. Makerfield (1)
66. Manor Moor (1)
67. Marple (1)
68. Middleton North (1)
69. Middleton South (1)
70. Moorside (1)
71. Moss Side & Wilbraham (1)
72. Old Trafford (1)
73. Orrell (1)
74. Park (1)
75. Pendlebury (1)
76. Pendleton (1)
77. Prestwich (1)
78. Radcliffe (1)
79. Reddish (1)
80. Rochdale Central (1)
81. Rochdale North (1)
82. Rochdale South (1)
83. Rochdale West (1)
84. Royton (1)
85. Saddleworth (1)
86. Sale East (1)
87. Sale West (1)
88. Seedley (1)
89. Sharston & Woodhouse Park (1)
90. Smithills & Deane-cum-Heaton (1)
91. Stalybridge (1)
92. Standish with Langtree (1)
93. Stretford (1)
94. Tonge & Breightmet (1)
95. Tyldesley South & Bedford (1)
96. Urmston & Flixton (1)
97. Westhoughton (1)
98. Whalley Range & Chorlton (1)
99. Whitefield (1)
100. Wigan North (1)
101. Wigan South (1)
102. Wigan West (1)
103. Winton (1)
104. Worsley (1)

== Electoral wards by constituency ==
Wards as they existed on 1 December 2020.

=== Altrincham and Sale West ===
Trafford: Altrincham; Ashton upon Mersey; Bowdon; Broadheath; Hale Barns; Hale Central; St. Mary’s; Timperley; Village.

=== Ashton-under-Lyne ===
Tameside: Ashton Hurst; Ashton St. Michael’s; Ashton Waterloo; Audenshaw; Droylsden East; Droylsden West; Dukinfield; St. Peter’s.

=== Blackley and Middleton South ===
Manchester: Charlestown; Crumpsall; Harpurhey; Higher Blackley; Moston.

Rochdale: East Middleton; South Middleton.

=== Bolton North East ===
Bolton: Astley Bridge; Bradshaw; Breightmet; Bromley Cross; Crompton; Halliwell; Little Lever & Darcy Lever; Tonge with the Haulgh.

=== Bolton South and Walkden ===
Bolton: Farnworth; Great Lever; Harper Green; Kearsley; Rumworth.

Salford: Little Hulton; Walkden North; Walkden South.

=== Bolton West ===
Bolton: Heaton & Lostock; Horwich & Blackrod; Horwich North East; Hulton; Smithills; Westhoughton North & Chew Moor; Westhoughton South.

=== Bury North ===
Bury: Church; East; Elton; Moorside; North Manor; Radcliffe North; Ramsbottom; Redvales; Tottington.

=== Bury South ===
Bury: Besses; Holyrood; Pilkington Park; Radcliffe East; Radcliffe West; St. Mary’s; Sedgley; Unsworth.

Salford: Kersal & Broughton Park.

=== Cheadle ===
Stockport: Bramhall North; Bramhall South & Woodford; Cheadle & Gatley; Cheadle Hulme North; Cheadle Hulme South; Heald Green; Stepping Hill.

=== Gorton and Denton ===
Manchester: Burnage; Gorton & Abbey Hey; Levenshulme; Longsight.

Tameside: Denton North East; Denton South; Denton West.

=== Hazel Grove ===
Stockport: Bredbury & Woodley; Bredbury Green & Romiley; Hazel Grove; Manor; Marple North; Marple South & High Lane; Offerton.

=== Heywood and Middleton North ===
Rochdale: Bamford; Castleton; Hopwood Hall; Norden; North Heywood; North Middleton; Spotland & Falinge; West Heywood; West Middleton.

=== Leigh and Atherton ===
Wigan: Atherleigh (polling districts LCA (part), LCB, LCC, LCD & LCE); Atherton; Golborne & Lowton West; Leigh East; Leigh South; Leigh West (polling districts LDB, LDC, LDD, LDE & LDF); Lowton East; Tyldesley.

=== Makerfield ===
Wigan: Abram; Ashton; Atherleigh (polling district LCA (part)); Bryn; Hindley; Hindley Green; Leigh West (polling district LDA); Orrell; Winstanley; Worsley Mesnes.

=== Manchester Central ===
Manchester: Ancoats & Beswick; Cheetham; Clayton & Openshaw; Deansgate; Miles Platting & Newton Heath; Piccadilly.

Oldham: Failsworth East; Failsworth West.

=== Manchester Rusholme ===
Manchester: Ardwick; Fallowfield; Hulme; Moss Side; Rusholme; Whalley Range.

=== Manchester Withington ===
Manchester: Chorlton; Chorlton Park; Didsbury East; Didsbury West; Old Moat; Withington.

=== Oldham East and Saddleworth ===
Oldham: Alexandra; Crompton; Saddleworth North; Saddleworth South; Saddleworth West & Lees; St. James’; St. Mary’s; Shaw; Waterhead.

=== Oldham West, Chadderton and Royton ===
Oldham: Chadderton Central; Chadderton North; Chadderton South; Coldhurst; Hollinwood; Medlock Vale; Royton North; Royton South; Werneth.

=== Rochdale ===
Rochdale: Balderstone & Kirkholt; Central Rochdale; Healey; Kingsway; Littleborough Lakeside; Milkstone & Deeplish; Milnrow & Newhey; Smallbridge & Firgrove; Wardle & West Littleborough.

=== Salford ===
Salford: Blackfriars & Trinity; Broughton; Claremont; Ordsall; Pendlebury & Clifton; Pendleton & Charlestown; Quays; Swinton Park; Weaste & Seedley.

=== Stalybridge and Hyde ===
Tameside: Dukinfield Stalybridge; Hyde Godley; Hyde Newton; Hyde Werneth; Longdendale; Mossley; Stalybridge North; Stalybridge South.

=== Stockport ===
Stockport: Brinnington & Central; Davenport & Cale Green; Edgeley & Cheadle Heath; Heatons North; Heatons South; Reddish North; Reddish South.

=== Stretford and Urmston ===
Trafford: Bucklow-St. Martins; Clifford; Davyhulme East; Davyhulme West; Flixton; Gorse Hill; Longford; Stretford; Urmston.

=== Wigan ===
Wigan: Aspull New Springs Whelley; Douglas; Ince; Pemberton; Shevington with Lower Ground; Standish with Langtree; Wigan Central; Wigan West.

=== Worsley and Eccles ===
Salford: Barton & Winton; Boothstown & Ellenbrook; Cadishead & Lower Irlam; Eccles; Higher Irlam & Peel Green; Swinton & Wardley; Worsley & Westwood Park.

Wigan: Astley Mosley Common.

=== Wythenshawe and Sale East ===
Manchester: Baguley; Brooklands; Northenden; Sharston; Woodhouse Park.

Trafford: Brooklands; Priory; Sale Moor.

== See also ==
- List of parliamentary constituencies in Greater Manchester
