= Tameside Metropolitan Borough Council elections =

Local government elections in Greater Manchester, England

Tameside Metropolitan Borough Council elections are generally held three years out of every four, with a third of the council being elected each time. Tameside Metropolitan Borough Council is the local authority for the metropolitan borough of Tameside in Greater Manchester, England. Since the last boundary changes in 2023, 57 councillors have been elected from 19 wards.

== Council elections ==
- 1998 Tameside Metropolitan Borough Council election
- 1999 Tameside Metropolitan Borough Council election
- 2000 Tameside Metropolitan Borough Council election
- 2002 Tameside Metropolitan Borough Council election
- 2003 Tameside Metropolitan Borough Council election
- 2004 Tameside Metropolitan Borough Council election (whole Metropolitan Borough Council elected after boundary changes)
- 2006 Tameside Metropolitan Borough Council election
- 2007 Tameside Metropolitan Borough Council election
- 2008 Tameside Metropolitan Borough Council election
- 2010 Tameside Metropolitan Borough Council election
- 2011 Tameside Metropolitan Borough Council election
- 2012 Tameside Metropolitan Borough Council election
- 2014 Tameside Metropolitan Borough Council election
- 2015 Tameside Metropolitan Borough Council election
- 2016 Tameside Metropolitan Borough Council election
- 2018 Tameside Metropolitan Borough Council election
- 2019 Tameside Metropolitan Borough Council election
- 2021 Tameside Metropolitan Borough Council election
- 2022 Tameside Metropolitan Borough Council election
- 2023 Tameside Metropolitan Borough Council election (new ward boundaries)
- 2024 Tameside Metropolitan Borough Council election
- 2026 Tameside Metropolitan Borough Council election

== Results maps ==
2004 results map

2006 results map

2007 results map

2008 results map

2010 results map

2011 results map

2012 results map

2014 results map

2015 results map

2016 results map

2018 results map

2019 results map

2021 results map

2022 results map

2023 results map

2024 results map

2026 results map

== By-election results ==
=== 2006-2010 ===
Denton South By-election 29 June 2006
Party	Candidate	Votes	%	±%
Labour	Walter Downs	900	52.2	−9.3
Conservative	Thomas Jones	346	20.1	−18.4
BNP	Anthony Jones	316	18.3	+18.3
Liberal Democrats	David Barber	115	6.7	+6.7
Green	Nigel Rolland	47	2.7	+2.7
Majority		554	32.1	
Turnout		1,724	20.5	
Labour hold		Swing		

Stalybridge North By-election 29 June 2006
Party	Candidate	Votes	%	±%
Labour	George Roberts	773	45.6	−2.2
Conservative	David Buckley	427	25.2	−8.2
BNP	Paul Hindley	283	16.7	+16.7
Green	Jean Smee	137	8.1	−10.7
Liberal Democrats	Peter Ball-Foster	75	4.4	+4.4
Majority		346	20.4	
Turnout		1,695	18.8	
Labour hold		Swing		

Hyde Newton By-election 5 February 2009
Party	Candidate	Votes	%	±%
Labour	Philip Fitzpatrick	1,379	45.6	+9.0
BNP	Rosalind Gauci	889	29.4	+1.9
Conservative	John Welsh	485	16.0	−7.8
Liberal Democrats	Peter Ball-Foster	172	5.7	−6.5
Green	Nigel Rolland	69	2.3	+2.3
UKIP	Angela McManus	33	1.1	+1.1
Majority		490	16.2	
Turnout		3,027	32.0	
Labour hold		Swing		

Denton North East By-election 30 July 2009
Party	Candidate	Votes	%	±%
Labour	Denise Ward	1,258	47.8	+2.3
Conservative	Floyd Paterson	660	25.1	−11.3
BNP	Rosalind Gauci	358	13.6	+13.6
UKIP	John Cooke	193	7.3	+7.3
Green	Rachell Lucas	164	6.2	+6.
Majority		598	22.7	
Turnout		2,633	31.5	
Labour hold		Swing		

=== 2010-2014 ===
Longdendale By-election 30 September 2010
Party	Candidate	Votes	%	±%
Labour	Janet Cooper	1,275	49.0	+5.3
Conservative	Robert Adlard	1,083	41.6	+3.6
Green	Melaine Roberts	99	3.8	−5.1
BNP	Anthony Jones	80	3.1	+3.1
UKIP	Kevin Misell	67	2.6	−6.7
Majority		192	7.4	
Turnout		2,604	33	
Labour hold		Swing		

=== 2014-2018 ===
Droylsden East By-election 26 October 2017
Party	Candidate	Votes	%	±%
Labour	David John Mills	1,064	60.3	+8.9
Conservative	Matt Stevenson	577	32.7	+23.6
Liberal Democrats	Shaun Clive Offerman	63	3.6	+3.6
Green	Jean Margaret Smee	60	3.4	−2.5
Majority		487	27.6	
Turnout		1,764	19.8	
Labour hold		Swing		

Droylsden East By-election 8 March 2018
Party	Candidate	Votes	%	±%
Labour	Laura Boyle	986	61.5	+10.1
Conservative	Matt Stevenson	489	30.5	+21.4
Green	Annie Train	98	6.1	+0.2
Liberal Democrats	Sahun Offerman	30	1.9	+1.9
Majority		497	31.0	
Turnout		1,603		
Labour hold		Swing		

=== 2018-2022 ===
Ashton Waterloo By-election 6 September 2018
Party	Candidate	Votes	%	±%
Labour	Pauline Hollinshead	889	52.5	−4.9
Green	Lee Huntbach	448	26.4	+12.7
Conservative	Therese Costello	357	21.1	−7.8
Majority		441	26.0	
Turnout		1,694		
Labour hold		Swing		

Denton West By-election 12 December 2019
Party	Candidate	Votes	%	±%
Labour	George Jones	3,041	53.2	−5.5
Conservative	Thomas Dunne	2,120	37.1	+14.7
Green	Jean Smee	303	5.3	−13.5
Liberal Democrats	Alice Mason-Power	247	4.3	+4.3
Majority		921	16.1	
Turnout		5,711		
Labour hold		Swing		

=== 2022-2026 ===
Longdendale By-election 10 April 2025
Party	Candidate	Votes	%	±%
Reform	Allan Hopwood	911	46.6	+46.6
Labour	Francesca Coates	489	25.0	−34.4
Conservative	Kieron Wild	242	12.4	−10.3
Green	Amanda Hickling	237	12.1	−4.5
Independent	Emma Leyla	76	3.9	+3.9
Majority		422	21.6	
Turnout		1,955		
Reform gain from Labour		Swing		
