= Dukinfield (ward) =

Dukinfield (Tameside)
- Electoral ward
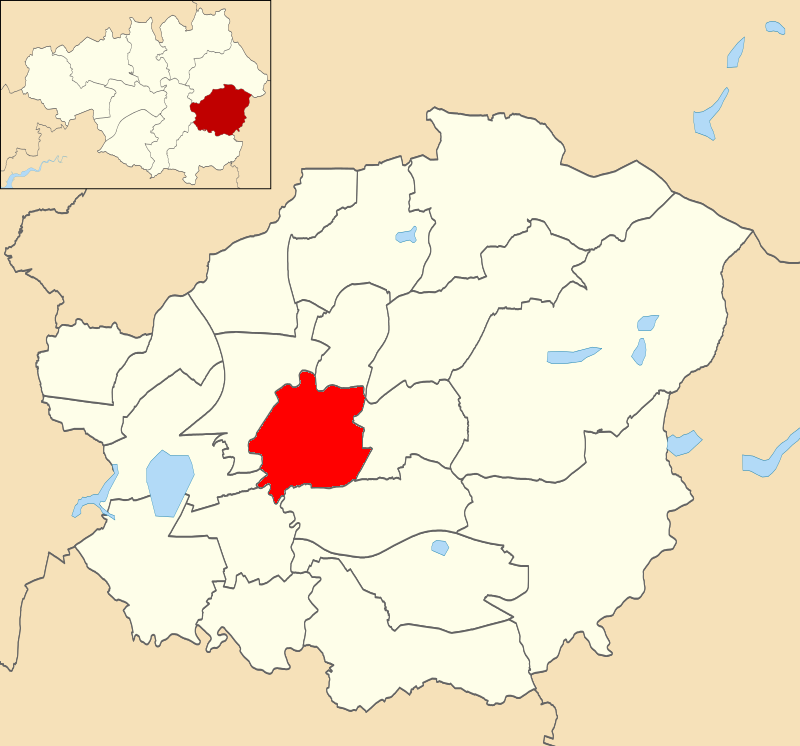
- Dukinfield within Tameside

- Coat of arms
- Motto: Industry and Integrity
- Interactive map of Dukinfield (Tameside)
- Coordinates: 53.4737°N 2.0905°W
- Country: United Kingdom
- Constituent country: England
- Region: North West England
- County: Greater Manchester
- Metropolitan borough: Tameside
- Created: 2004
- Named after: Denton and Reddish

Government UK Parliament constituency: Denton and Reddish
  - Type: Unicameral
  - Body: Tameside Metropolitan Borough Council
  - Leader of the Council: Brenda Warrington (Labour)
  - Councillor: Jacqueline Lane (Labour)
  - Councillor: John Taylor (Labour)
  - Councillor: Brian Wild (Labour)

Dukinfield is an electoral ward of Tameside, England. It is represented in Westminster by Andrew Gwynne Labour MP for Denton and Reddish.

== Councillors ==
The ward is represented by three councillors: Jacqueline Lane (Lab), John Taylor (Lab), and Brian Wild (Lab).

Election	Councillor	Councillor	Councillor
2004	Jacqueline Forth (Lab)	John Taylor (Lab)	Brian Wild (Lab)
2006	Jacqueline Lane (née Forth) (Lab)	John Taylor (Lab)	Brian Wild (Lab)
2007	Jacqueline Lane (Lab)	John Taylor (Lab)	Brian Wild (Lab)
2008	Jacqueline Lane (Lab)	John Taylor (Lab)	Brian Wild (Lab)
2010	Jacqueline Lane (Lab)	John Taylor (Lab)	Brian Wild (Lab)
2011	Jacqueline Lane (Lab)	John Taylor (Lab)	Brian Wild (Lab)
2012	Jacqueline Lane (Lab)	John Taylor (Lab)	Brian Wild (Lab)
2014	Jacqueline Lane (Lab)	John Taylor (Lab)	Brian Wild (Lab)
2015	Jacqueline Lane (Lab)	John Taylor (Lab)	Brian Wild (Lab)
2016	Jacqueline Lane (Lab)	John Taylor (Lab)	Brian Wild (Lab)
2018	Jacqueline Lane (Lab)	John Taylor (Lab)	Brian Wild (Lab)
2019	Jacqueline Lane (Lab)	John Taylor (Lab)	Brian Wild (Lab)

indicates seat up for re-election.

== Elections in 2010s ==
=== May 2019 ===
2019
Party	Candidate	Votes	%	±%
Labour	John Taylor	1,039	47.4	
Green	Julie Wood	700	31.9	
Conservative	Lucy Turner	453	20.7	
Majority				
Turnout		2,192	23.1	
Labour hold		Swing		

=== May 2018 ===
2018
Party	Candidate	Votes	%	±%
Labour	Jackie Lane*	1,427	61.5	
Conservative	Lucy Turner	623	26.8	
Green	Julie Wood	271	11.7	
Turnout		2,328	24.5	
Labour hold		Swing		

=== May 2016 ===
2016
Party	Candidate	Votes	%	±%
Labour	Brian Wild	1,400	52.65	
UKIP	Ian Cooke	590	22.19	
Conservative	David Woodward	367	13.80	
Green	Julie Wood	162	6.09	
Independent	Dave Tate	140	5.27	
Majority		810	30.46	
Turnout		2,659	29	
Labour hold		Swing		

=== May 2015 ===
2015
Party	Candidate	Votes	%	±%
Labour	John Taylor	2,416	48.98	
UKIP	John Cooke	1,204	24.41	
Conservative	David Liley	961	19.48	
Green	Julie Wood	352	7.14	
Majority		1,212	24.57	
Turnout		4,933	52	
Labour hold		Swing		

=== May 2014 ===
2014
Party	Candidate	Votes	%	±%
Labour	Jacqueline Lane	1,419	49.68	
UKIP	John Cooke	866	30.32	
Conservative	Zoe Gallagher	352	12.32	
Green	Julie Wood	219	7.67	
Majority		553	19.36	
Turnout		2,856	30	
Labour hold		Swing		

=== May 2012 ===
2012
Party	Candidate	Votes	%	±%
Labour	Brian Wild	1,553	59.14	+14.44
Independent	Roy West	325	12.38	−13.54
Conservative	Brenda Roden	304	11.58	−8.97
UKIP	John Cooke	248	9.44	N/A
Green	Dylan Lancaster	196	7.46	N/A
Majority		1,249	47.56	
Turnout		2,634	28	−3.7
Labour hold		Swing		

=== May 2011 ===
2011
Party	Candidate	Votes	%	±%
Labour	John Taylor	1,905	60.88	
Conservative	Christine Marshall	550	17.58	
BNP	Roy West	340	10.87	
UKIP	John Cooke	189	6.04	
Green	Dylan Lancaster	145	4.63	
Majority		1,355	43.30	
Turnout		3,129	33	
Labour hold		Swing		

=== May 2010 ===
2010
Party	Candidate	Votes	%	±%
Labour	Jacqueline Lane	2,778	55.56	
Conservative	Gaynor Paterson	1,147	22.94	
BNP	Roy West	693	13.86	
Green	Dylan Lancaster	382	7.64	
Majority		1,631	32.62	
Turnout		5,000	54	
Labour hold		Swing		

== Elections in 2000s ==
=== May 2008 ===
2008
Party	Candidate	Votes	%	±%
Labour	Brian Wild	1,266	44.70	
BNP	Roy West	734	25.92	
Conservative	Lynn Major	582	20.55	
Green	Martine Marshall	250	8.83	
Majority		532	18.79	
Turnout		2,832	32	
Labour hold		Swing		

=== May 2007 ===
2007
Party	Candidate	Votes	%	±%
Labour	John Charles Taylor	1,364	50.9	
BNP	Roy Kevin West	520	19.4	
Conservative	Stacey Frances Knighton	455	17.0	
Green	Martine Marshall	340	12.7	
Majority		844	31.5	
Turnout		2,679	30.9	
Labour hold		Swing		

=== May 2006 ===
2006
Party	Candidate	Votes	%	±%
Labour	Jacqueline Lane	1,258	51.64	
Green	Vernon Marshall	678	27.83	
Independent	Fiona Henderson	500	20.53	
Majority		580	23.81	
Turnout		2,436	28	
Labour hold		Swing		

=== June 2004 ===
2004
Party	Candidate	Votes	%	±%
Labour	Brian Wild	1,781	39.0	
Labour	John Taylor	1,661		
Labour	Jacqueline Forth	1,604		
Green	Vernon Marshall	1,032	22.6	
Conservative	Dennis Rick	903	19.8	
Independent	Grethe Dillon	854	18.7	
National Front Britain for the British	Terry Blackman	0	0.00	
Majority				
Turnout			37.0	
