= Audenshaw (ward) =

Audenshaw (Tameside)
- Electoral ward
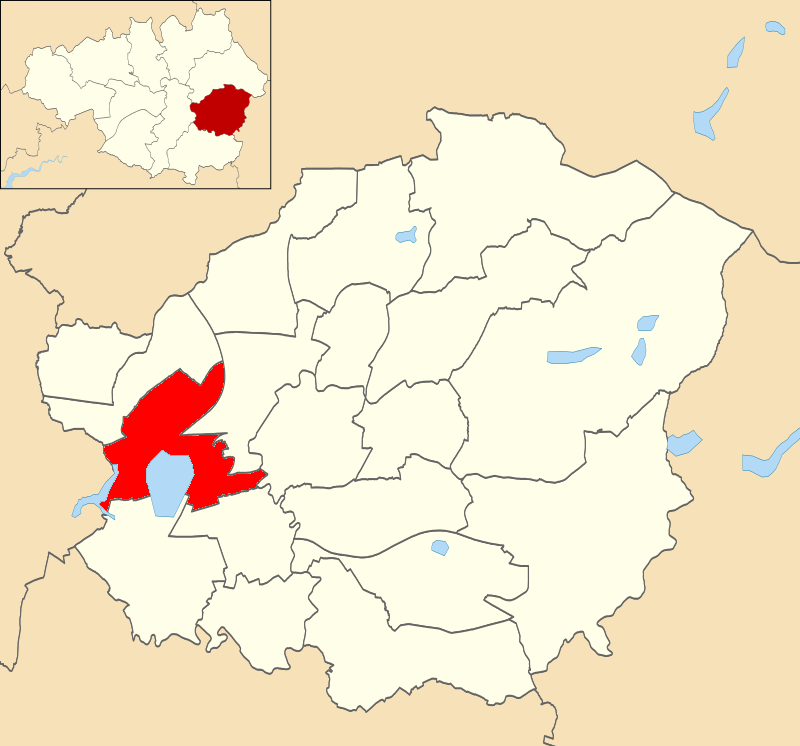
- Audenshaw within Tameside

- Coat of arms
- Motto: Industry and Integrity
- Interactive map of Audenshaw (Tameside)
- Coordinates: 53.4721°N 2.1298°W
- Country: United Kingdom
- Constituent country: England
- Region: North West England
- County: Greater Manchester
- Metropolitan borough: Tameside
- Created: 2004
- Named after: Denton and Reddish

Government UK Parliament constituency: Denton and Reddish
  - Type: Unicameral
  - Body: Tameside Metropolitan Borough Council
  - Leader of the Council: Brenda Warrington (Labour)
  - Councillor: Oliver Ryan (Labour)
  - Councillor: Maria Bailey (Labour)
  - Councillor: Teresa Smith (Labour)

Audenshaw is an electoral ward of Tameside, England. It is represented in Westminster by Andrew Gwynne Labour MP for Denton and Reddish.

== Councillors ==
The ward is represented by three councillors: Oliver Ryan (Lab), Maria Bailey (Lab), and Teresa Smith (Lab).

Election	Councillor	Councillor	Councillor
2004	Allison Seabourne (Lib Dem)	Peter Wright (Lib Dem)	Karen Wright (Lib Dem)
2006	Colin White (Lab)	Peter Wright (Lib Dem)	Karen Wright (Lib Dem)
2007	Colin White (Lab)	Wendy Brelsford (Lab)	Karen Wright (Lib Dem)
2008	Colin White (Lab)	Wendy Brelsford (Lab)	Jean Brazil (Lab)
2010	Colin White (Lab)	Wendy Brelsford (Lab)	Jean Brazil (Lab)
2011	Colin White (Lab)	Maria Bailey (Lab)	Jean Brazil (Lab)
2012	Colin White (Lab)	Maria Bailey (Lab)	Teresa Smith (Lab)
2014	Oliver Ryan (Lab)	Maria Bailey (Lab)	Teresa Smith (Lab)
2015	Oliver Ryan (Lab)	Maria Bailey (Lab)	Teresa Smith (Lab)
2016	Oliver Ryan (Lab)	Maria Bailey (Lab)	Teresa Smith (Lab)
2018	Oliver Ryan (Lab)	Maria Bailey (Lab)	Teresa Smith (Lab)

indicates seat up for re-election.

== Elections in 2010s ==
=== May 2018 ===
2018
Party	Candidate	Votes	%	±%
Labour	Oliver Ryan*	1,581		
Conservative	Danny Mather	922		
UKIP	Peter Harris	195		
Green	Georgia Blakeney	161		
Turnout		2,865	30	
Labour hold		Swing		

=== May 2016 ===
2016
Party	Candidate	Votes	%	±%
Labour	Teresa Smith	1,465	45.31	
Conservative	David Johnson	858	26.54	
UKIP	Maurice Jackson	725	22.42	
Green	Joe Henthorn	167	5.17	
Community Party of Great Britain	Paul Ward	18	0.56	
Majority		607	18.78	
Turnout		3,233	35	
Labour hold		Swing		

=== May 2015 ===
2015
Party	Candidate	Votes	%	±%
Labour	Maria Bailey	2,832	52.15	
UKIP	Maurice Jackson	1,988	36.61	
Green	Mark Stanley	526	9.69	
Communist	Paul Ward	84	1.55	
Majority		844	15.54	
Turnout		5,430	60	
Labour hold		Swing		

=== May 2014 ===
2014
Party	Candidate	Votes	%	±%
Labour	Oliver Ryan	1,284	42.32	
UKIP	David Turner	1,162	38.30	
Conservative	Colin White	429	14.14	
Green	Nancy Jaegar	159	5.24	
Majority		122	4.02	
Turnout		3,034	33	
Labour hold		Swing		

=== May 2012 ===
2012
Party	Candidate	Votes	%	±%
Labour	Teresa Smith	1,530	58.78	+17.78
Conservative	Gaynor Paterson	440	16.90	−15.24
UKIP	Tracy Radcliffe	416	15.98	N/A
Green	Stuart Bennett	217	8.34	N/A
Majority		1,090	41.87	
Turnout		2,612	29.4	−7.5
Labour hold		Swing		

=== May 2011 ===
2011
Party	Candidate	Votes	%	±%
Labour	Maria Bailey	1,750	55.86	
Conservative	Stacey Knighton	795	25.38	
BNP	Robert Booth	239	7.63	
UKIP	Joanna Herod	198	6.32	
Green	Stuart Bennett	151	4.82	
Majority		955	30.48	
Turnout		3,133	36	
Labour hold		Swing		

=== May 2010 ===
2010
Party	Candidate	Votes	%	±%
Labour	Colin White	2,714	51.68	
Conservative	Sharon Knighton	1,710	32.56	
BNP	Anthony Jones	828	15.77	
Majority		1,004	19.12	
Turnout		5,252	62	
Labour hold		Swing		

== Elections in 2000s ==
=== May 2008 ===
2008
Party	Candidate	Votes	%	±%
Labour	Jean Brazil	1,292	41.00	
Conservative	Stacey Knighton	1,013	32.15	
BNP	David Gough	846	26.85	
Majority		279	8.85	
Turnout		3,151	37	
Labour gain from Liberal Democrats		Swing		

=== May 2007 ===
2007
Party	Candidate	Votes	%	±%
Labour	Wendy Brelsford	1,286	47.9	
Conservative	Elizabeth Dawn Charlesworth	899	33.5	
Liberal Democrats	Allison Kay Seabourne	502	18.7	
Majority		387	14.4	
Turnout		2,687	31.6	
Labour hold		Swing		

=== May 2006 ===
2006
Party	Candidate	Votes	%	±%
Labour	Colin White	1,102	40.77	
Liberal Democrats	Allison Seabourne	955	35.33	
Conservative	Georgina Greenwood	646	23.90	
Majority		147	5.44	
Turnout		2,703	32	
Labour gain from Liberal Democrats				

=== June 2004 ===
2004
Party	Candidate	Votes	%	±%
Liberal Democrats	Karen Wright	1,680	45.4	
Liberal Democrats	Peter Wright	1,587		
Liberal Democrats	Allison Seabourne	1,257		
Labour	Patricia Haslam	1,185	32.0	
Labour	Katie Cruickshank	962		
Labour	Colin White	930		
Conservative	Alurie O'Sullivan	834	22.5	
Majority				
Turnout			38.5	
