= Gorton and Denton =

UK Parliament constituency (since 2024)

- Borough constituency for the House of Commons
- Interactive map of boundaries since 2024
- Location within North West England
- County: Greater Manchester
- Electorate: 74,306 (March 2020)
- Major settlements: Gorton and Denton

Current constituency
- Created: 2024
- Member of Parliament: Hannah Spencer (Green)
- Seats: One
- Created from: Manchester Gorton (part), Manchester Withington (part) & Denton and Reddish (part)

Gorton and Denton is a constituency in Greater Manchester represented in the House of Commons of the UK Parliament, which came into being for the 2024 UK general election, following the 2023 review of Westminster constituencies.

The Member of Parliament (MP) is Hannah Spencer of the Green Party, who won the 2026 Gorton and Denton by-election on 26 February to fill the seat of Andrew Gwynne, who resigned on health grounds in January 2026.

== Constituency profile ==
Gorton and Denton is a mostly urban constituency located in Greater Manchester. It includes the Manchester neighbourhoods of Gorton, Levenshulme, Burnage and Longsight, and the connected town of Denton in the borough of Tameside. The neighbourhoods within Manchester have a history of manufacturing and engineering and currently experience high levels of deprivation, with most of this area falling within the top 10% most-deprived parts of England. Denton was traditionally a textile manufacturing and coal mining area and has average levels of wealth. House prices are lower than the rest of North West England and considerably lower than the national average.

Compared to the rest of the country, residents of Gorton and Denton are young and have low levels of education. They are less likely to work in professional occupations and household income is low. White people made up 57% of the population at the 2021 census. Asians (mainly Pakistanis) formed the largest ethnic minority group at 27% and Black people were 9%. The Asian population is concentrated in Longsight, where they make up a majority of residents, whilst Denton is over 90% White. Almost all local council seats in the constituency are represented by the Labour Party, although there is some Workers Party representation in Longsight. The Manchester wards are on average 57% white English with 42% of the population either a university graduate or a current university student. The Tameside wards are on average 83% white, 86% UK born, and 30% in routine or semi-routine jobs.

An estimated 50% of voters in the constituency supported leaving the European Union in the 2016 referendum, marginally lower than the nationwide figure of 52%.

== Boundaries ==
Further to the 2023 boundary review, the composition of the constituency is as follows from the 2024 general election (as they existed on 1 December 2020):

- The City of Manchester wards of: Burnage; Gorton & Abbey Hey; Levenshulme; Longsight.
- The Metropolitan Borough of Tameside wards of: Denton North East; Denton South; Denton West.

It comprises the following areas:

- Gorton, Levenshulme and Longsight, previously part of the abolished constituency of Manchester Gorton
- Burnage, transferred from Manchester Withington
- The three wards which make up the town of Denton, previously part of the abolished constituency of Denton and Reddish

== Members of Parliament ==
Election	Member	Party	Notes
2024	Andrew Gwynne	Labour Co-op	
2025	Andrew Gwynne	Independent	Whip removed in February 2025
2026 by-election	Hannah Spencer	Green	

== Elections ==
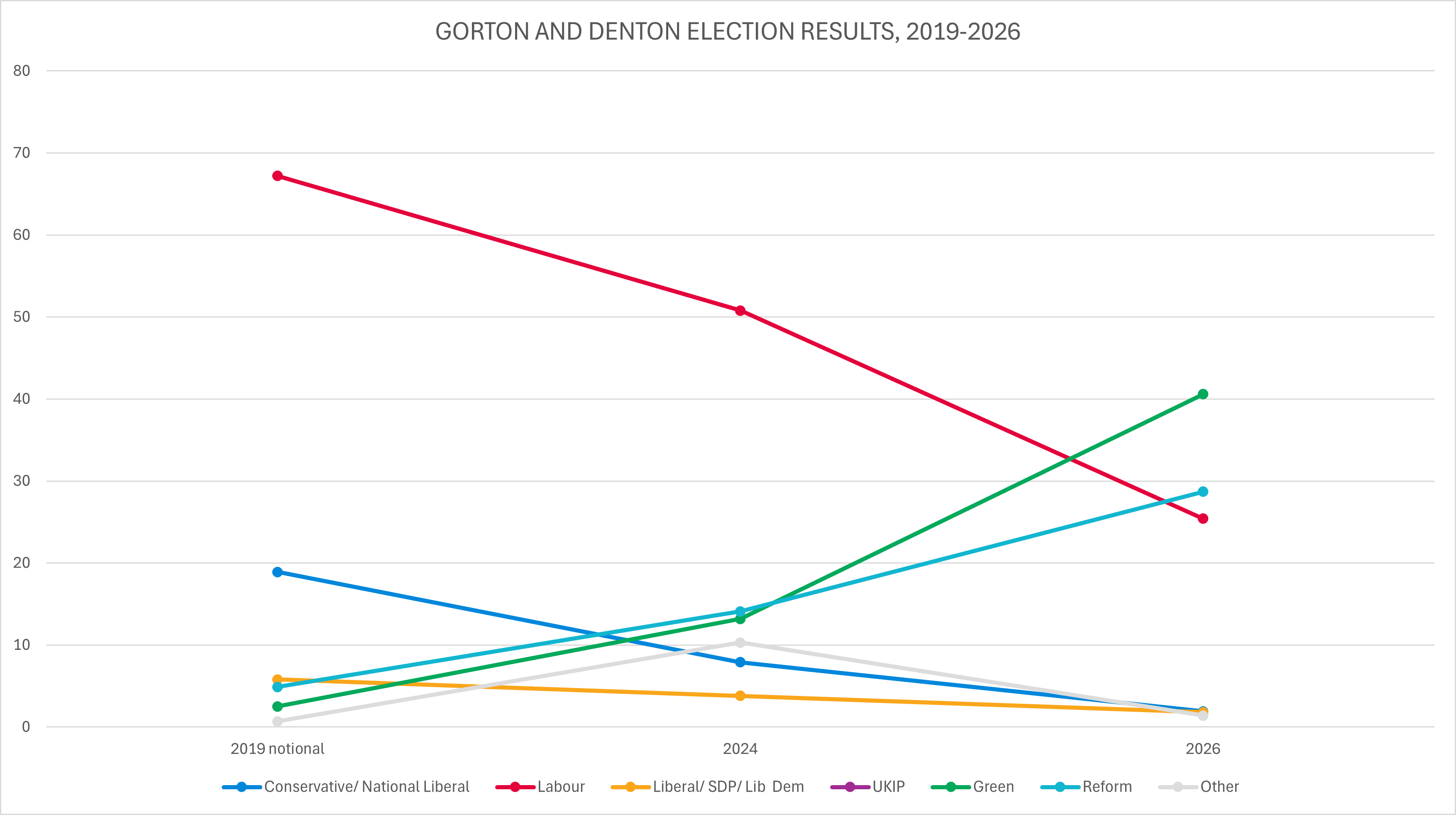
Election results 2019-2026

=== Elections in the 2020s ===
2026 Gorton and Denton by-election
Party	Candidate	Votes	%	±%
Green	Hannah Spencer	14,980	40.7	+27.5
Reform	Matt Goodwin	10,578	28.7	+14.6
Labour	Angeliki Stogia	9,364	25.4	−25.4
Conservative	Charlotte Cadden	706	1.9	−6.0
Liberal Democrats	Jackie Pearcey	653	1.8	−2.0
Monster Raving Loony	Sir Oink A-Lot	159	0.4	N/A
Advance UK	Nick Buckley	154	0.4	N/A
Rejoin EU	Joseph O'Meachair	98	0.3	N/A
Libertarian	Dan Clarke	47	0.1	N/A
SDP	Sebastian Moore	46	0.1	N/A
Communist League	Hugo Wils	29	0.1	N/A
Majority		4,402	11.9	
Turnout		36,904	47.6	−0.2
Registered electors		77,501		
Green gain from Labour		Swing	26.4	

General election 2024: Gorton and Denton
Party	Candidate	Votes	%	±%
Labour Co-op	Andrew Gwynne	18,555	50.8	−16.4
Reform	Lee Moffitt	5,142	14.1	+9.2
Green	Amanda Gardner	4,810	13.2	+10.7
Workers Party	Amir Burney	3,766	10.3	N/A
Conservative	Ruth Welsh	2,888	7.9	−11.0
Liberal Democrats	John Reid	1,399	3.8	−2.0
Majority		13,413	36.7	−11.7
Turnout		36,560	47.8	−13.9
Registered electors		76,524		
Labour notional hold		Swing	−12.8	

=== Elections in the 2010s ===
2019 notional result
Party	Vote	%
Labour	30,814	67.2
Conservative	8,639	18.9
Liberal Democrats	2,671	5.8
Brexit Party	2,225	4.9
Green	1,155	2.5
Others	324	0.7
Turnout	45,828	61.7
Electorate	74,306	
