= Droylsden East =

Droylsden East (Tameside)
- Electoral ward
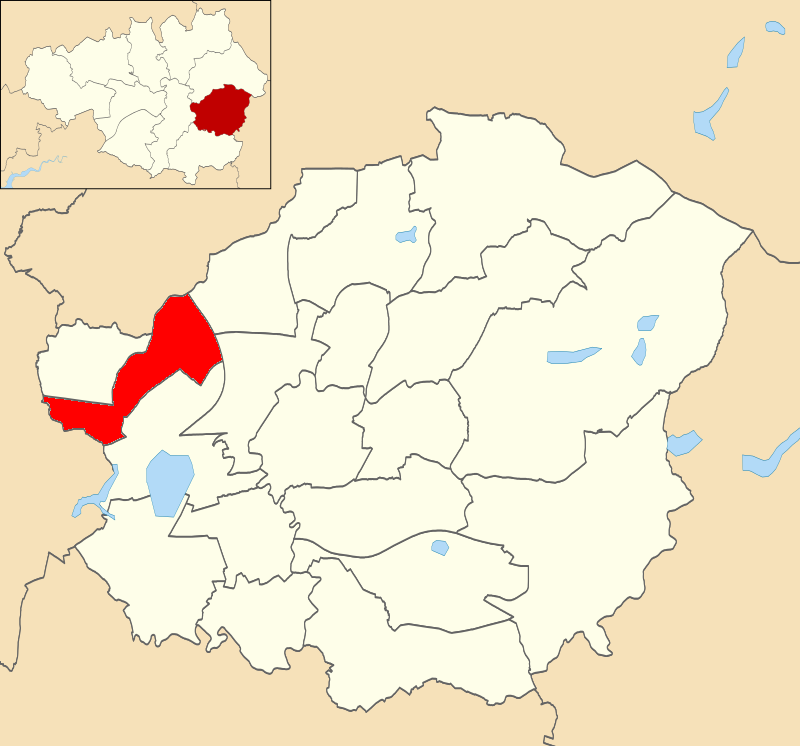
- Droylsden East within Tameside

- Coat of arms
- Motto: Industry and Integrity
- Interactive map of Droylsden East (Tameside)
- Coordinates: 53.4854°N 2.1378°W
- Country: United Kingdom
- Constituent country: England
- Region: North West England
- County: Greater Manchester
- Metropolitan borough: Tameside
- Created: 2004
- Named after: Ashton-under-Lyne

Government UK Parliament constituency: Ashton-under-Lyne
  - Type: Unicameral
  - Body: Tameside Metropolitan Borough Council
  - Leader of the Council: Brenda Warrington (Labour)
  - Councillor: Susan Quinn (Labour Co-op)
  - Councillor: Laura Boyle (Labour)
  - Councillor: David Mills (Labour)

Droylsden East is an electoral ward of Tameside, England. It is represented in Westminster by Angela Rayner Labour MP for Ashton-under-Lyne.

== Councillors ==
The ward is represented by three councillors: Susan Quinn (Lab Co-op), Laura Boyle (Lab), and David Mills (Lab).

Election	Councillor	Councillor	Councillor
2004	Susan Quinn (Lab Co-op)	Kieran Quinn (Lab Co-op)	Jim Middleton (Lab)
2006	Susan Quinn (Lab Co-op)	Kieran Quinn (Lab Co-op)	Jim Middleton (Lab)
2007	Susan Quinn (Lab Co-op)	Kieran Quinn (Lab Co-op)	Jim Middleton (Lab)
2008	Susan Quinn (Lab Co-op)	Kieran Quinn (Lab Co-op)	Jim Middleton (Lab)
2010	Susan Quinn (Lab Co-op)	Kieran Quinn (Lab Co-op)	Jim Middleton (Lab)
2011	Susan Quinn (Lab Co-op)	Kieran Quinn (Lab Co-op)	Jim Middleton (Lab)
2012	Susan Quinn (Lab Co-op)	Kieran Quinn (Lab Co-op)	Jim Middleton (Lab)
2014	Susan Quinn (Lab Co-op)	Kieran Quinn (Lab Co-op)	Jim Middleton (Lab)
2015	Susan Quinn (Lab Co-op)	Kieran Quinn (Lab Co-op)	Jim Middleton (Lab)
2016	Susan Quinn (Lab Co-op)	Kieran Quinn (Lab Co-op)	Jim Middleton (Lab)
By-election; 26 October 2017	Susan Quinn (Lab Co-op)	Kieran Quinn (Lab Co-op)	David Mills (Lab)
By-election; 8 March 2018	Susan Quinn (Lab Co-op)	Laura Boyle (Lab)	David Mills (Lab)
2018	Susan Quinn (Lab Co-op)	Laura Boyle (Lab)	David Mills (Lab)

indicates seat up for re-election. indicates seat won in by-election.

== Elections in 2010s ==
=== May 2018 ===
2018
Party	Candidate	Votes	%	±%
Labour	Sue Quinn*	1,333		
Conservative	Matt Stevenson	656		
Green	David Melvin	149		
Liberal Democrats	Shaun Offerman	70		
Turnout		2,213	24.7	
Labour hold		Swing		

=== By-election 8 March 2018 ===
By-election 8 March 2018
Party	Candidate	Votes	%	±%
Labour	Laura Boyle	986	61.5	
Conservative	Matt Stevenson	489	30.5	
Green	Annie Train	98	6.1	
Liberal Democrats	Sahun Offerman	30	1.9	
Majority		497		
Turnout		1,603	18	

=== By-election 26 October 2017 ===
By-election 26 October 2017
Party	Candidate	Votes	%	±%
Labour	David Mills	1,064	60.3	+8.9
Conservative	Matt Stevenson	577	32.7	+23.6
Liberal Democrats	Shaun Clive Offerman	63	3.6	+3.6
Greens	Jean Margaret Smee	60	3.4	−2.5
Majority		487	27.6	
Turnout		1,764	19.8	
Labour hold		Swing		

=== May 2016 ===
2016
Party	Candidate	Votes	%	±%
Labour	Jim Middleton	1,449	51.40	
UKIP	Ted Salmon	948	33.63	
Conservative	Scott Truter	256	9.08	
Green	Annie Train	166	5.89	
Majority		501	17.77	
Turnout		2,819	32	
Labour hold		Swing		

=== May 2015 ===
2015
Party	Candidate	Votes	%	±%
Labour Co-op	Kieran Quinn	2,826	54.12	
UKIP	Peter Harris	1,698	32.52	
Green	John McCarthy	399	7.64	
Independent	Sarah Delaney	299	5.73	
Majority		1,128	21.60	
Turnout		5,222	58	
Labour Co-op hold		Swing		

=== May 2014 ===
2014
Party	Candidate	Votes	%	±%
Labour Co-op	Sue Quinn	1,431	47.73	
UKIP	Ted Salmon	1,168	38.71	
Conservative	Liv Brannon	250	8.29	
Green	Mark Stanley	168	5.57	
Majority		263	8.72	
Turnout		3,017	34	
Labour Co-op hold		Swing		

=== May 2012 ===
2012
Party	Candidate	Votes	%	±%
Labour	Jim Middleton*	1,640	61.49	+15.42
UKIP	Ted Salmon	480	18.00	N/A
BNP	Robert Booth	236	8.85	−23.87
Conservative	Matt Holgate	221	8.29	−12.92
Green	Mark Stanley	90	3.37	N/A
Majority		1,160	43.49	
Turnout		2,681	30.4	−5.1
Labour hold		Swing		

=== May 2011 ===
2011
Party	Candidate	Votes	%	±%
Labour Co-op	Kieran Quinn	1,969	62.89	
UKIP	Ted Salmon	595	19.00	
Conservative	Dorothy Buckley	455	14.53	
Green	Mark Stanley	112	3.58	
Majority		1,374	43.88	
Turnout		3,131	36	
Labour Co-op hold		Swing		

=== May 2010 ===
2010
Party	Candidate	Votes	%	±%
Labour Co-op	Susan Quinn	2,761	51.46	
BNP	David Lomas	840	15.66	
Conservative	Lee Robinson	824	15.36	
Liberal Democrats	Charles Turner	671	12.51	
UKIP	Ted Salmon	269	5.01	
Majority		1,921	35.81	
Turnout		5,365	62	
Labour Co-op hold		Swing		

== Elections in 2000s ==
=== May 2008 ===
2008
Party	Candidate	Votes	%	±%
Labour	Jim Middleton	1,408	46.07	
BNP	David Lomas	1,000	32.72	
Conservative	Lee Robinson	648	21.20	
Majority		408	13.35	
Turnout		3,056	35	
Labour hold		Swing		

=== May 2007 ===
2007
Party	Candidate	Votes	%	±%
Labour Co-op	Kieran Quinn	1,582	53.7	
BNP	David Gough	665	22.6	
Conservative	Emlyn Richard Davis	411	14.0	
Liberal Democrats	Ian Dunlop	287	9.7	
Majority		917	31.1	
Turnout		2,945	35.0	
Labour Co-op hold		Swing		

=== May 2006 ===
2006
Party	Candidate	Votes	%	±%
Labour Co-op	Susan Quinn	1,396	48.51	
BNP	David Gough	619	21.51	
Conservative	Emlyn Davis	453	15.74	
Local Community Party	Jack Crossfield	410	14.25	
Majority		777	27	
Turnout		2,878	33	
Labour Co-op hold		Swing		

=== June 2004 ===
2004
Party	Candidate	Votes	%	±%
Labour	Jim Middleton	1,726	40.6	
Labour Co-op	Susan Quinn	1,563	-	
Labour Co-op	Keiran Quinn	1,422	-	
Local Community Party	Jack Crossfield	1,044	24.6	
BNP	David Gough	764	18.0	
Conservative	Lynn Major	714	16.8	
Majority				
Turnout			38.4	
