= Stalybridge North =

Stalybridge North (Tameside)
- Electoral ward
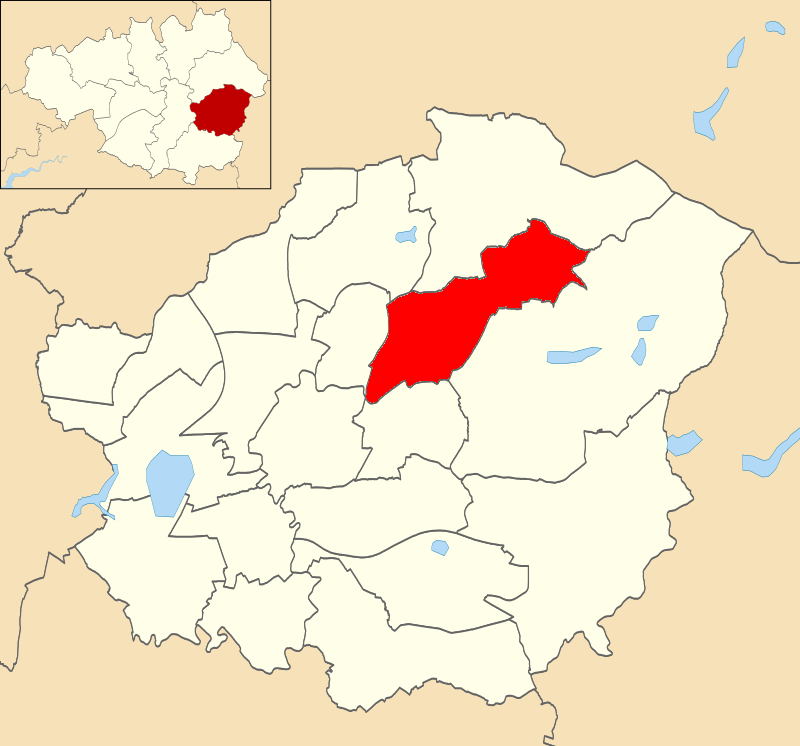
- Stalybridge North within Tameside

- Coat of arms
- Motto: Industry and Integrity
- Interactive map of Stalybridge North (Tameside)
- Coordinates: 53.4962°N 2.0450°W
- Country: United Kingdom
- Constituent country: England
- Region: North West England
- County: Greater Manchester
- Metropolitan borough: Tameside
- Created: 2004
- Named for: Stalybridge and Hyde

Government UK Parliament constituency: Stalybridge and Hyde
  - Type: Unicameral
  - Body: Tameside Metropolitan Borough Council
  - Leader of the Council: Brenda Warrington (Labour)
  - Councillor: Sam Gosling (Labour)
  - Councillor: Adrian Pearce (Labour)
  - Councillor: Jan Jackson (Labour Co-operative)

Stalybridge North is an electoral ward of Tameside, England. It is represented in Westminster by Jonathan Reynolds Labour Co-operative MP for Stalybridge and Hyde.

== Councillors ==
The ward is represented by three councillors: Sam Gosling (Lab), Adrian Pearce (Lab), and Jan Jackson (Lab Co-op).

Election	Councillor	Councillor	Councillor
2004	Kevin Welsh (Lab)	Frank Robinson (Lab)	Bernard Walsh (Lab)
2006	Kevin Welsh (Lab)	Frank Robinson (Lab)	Bernard Walsh (Lab)
By-election; 29 June 2006	Kevin Welsh (Lab)	George Roberts (Lab Co-op)	Bernard Walsh (Lab)
2007	Kevin Welsh (Lab)	George Roberts (Lab Co-op)	Bernard Walsh (Lab)
2008	Kevin Welsh (Lab)	George Roberts (Lab Co-op)	Clive Patrick (Con)
2010	Kevin Welsh (Lab)	George Roberts (Lab Co-op)	Clive Patrick (Con)
2011	Kevin Welsh (Lab)	George Roberts (Lab Co-op)	Clive Patrick (Con)
2012	Kevin Welsh (Lab)	George Roberts (Lab Co-op)	Jan Jackson (Lab Co-op)
2014	Kevin Welsh (Lab)	George Roberts (Lab Co-op)	Jan Jackson (Lab Co-op)
2015	Kevin Welsh (Lab)	Adrian Pearce (Lab)	Jan Jackson (Lab Co-op)
2016	Kevin Welsh (Lab)	Adrian Pearce (Lab)	Jan Jackson (Lab Co-op)
2018	Sam Gosling (Lab)	Adrian Pearce (Lab)	Jan Jackson (Lab Co-op)

indicates seat up for re-election. indicates seat won in by-election.

== Elections in 2010s ==
=== May 2018 ===
2018
Party	Candidate	Votes	%	±%
Labour	Sam Gosling	1,123		
Conservative	David Tilbrook	831		
Your Town, Our Town, Stalybridge Town	Lee Stafford	666		
Green	Laura Dias De Almeida	105		
Communist League	Hugo Wils	6		
Turnout		2,737	29	
Labour hold		Swing		

=== May 2016 ===
2016
Party	Candidate	Votes	%	±%
Labour Co-op	Jan Jackson	1,299	51.94	
Conservative	Colin White	795	31.79	
Green	Jean Smee	407	16.27	
Majority		504	20.15	
Turnout		2,501	27	
Labour Co-op hold		Swing		

=== May 2015 ===
2015
Party	Candidate	Votes	%	±%
Labour	Adrian Pearce	2,258	43.31	
Conservative	Colin White	1,466	28.12	
UKIP	Angela McManus	1,090	20.91	
Green	Dave Bradbury	399	7.65	
Majority		792	15.19	
Turnout		5,213	54	
Labour hold		Swing		

=== May 2014 ===
2014
Party	Candidate	Votes	%	±%
Labour	Kevin Welsh	1,125	38.91	
Conservative	Clive Patrick	811	28.05	
UKIP	Angela McManus	758	26.22	
Green	Jean Smee	197	6.81	
Majority		314	10.86	
Turnout		2,891	30	
Labour hold		Swing		

=== May 2012 ===
2012
Party	Candidate	Votes	%	±%
Labour Co-op	Jan Jackson	1,364	51.14	+10.06
Conservative	Clive Patrick	833	31.23	−11.47
English Democrat	Andrew Fogg	188	7.05	N/A
Green	Jean Smee	169	6.34	−2.87
UKIP	Emma Misell	113	4.24	−2.76
Majority		531	19.91	
Turnout		2,676	28.5	−1.2
Labour Co-op gain from Conservative		Swing		

=== May 2011 ===
2011
Party	Candidate	Votes	%	±%
Labour Co-op	George Roberts	1,667	54.19	
Conservative	Dominic Johnson	952	30.95	
Green	Jean Smee	230	7.48	
UKIP	Tracy Radcliffe	227	7.38	
Majority		715	23.24	
Turnout		3,076	32	
Labour Co-op hold		Swing		

=== May 2010 ===
2010
Party	Candidate	Votes	%	±%
Labour	Kevin Welsh	2,565	47.96	
Conservative	Dominic Johnson	1,730	32.35	
BNP	Jeffrey Clayton	452	8.45	
Green	Jean Smee	335	6.26	
UKIP	Tracy Radcliffe	266	4.97	
Majority		835	15.61	
Turnout		5,348	57	
Labour hold		Swing		

== Elections in 2000s ==
=== May 2008 ===
2008
Party	Candidate	Votes	%	±%
Conservative	Clive Patrick	1,159	42.70	
Labour	Bernard Walsh	1,115	41.08	
Green	Jean Smee	250	9.21	
UKIP	Tracy Radcliffe	190	7.00	
Majority		44	1.62	
Turnout		2,714	30	
Conservative gain from Labour		Swing		

=== May 2007 ===
2007
Party	Candidate	Votes	%	±%
Labour Co-op	George Roberts	1,190	46.9	
Conservative	Clive Alistair Patrick	920	36.3	
Green	Jean Margaret Smee	426	16.8	
Majority		270	10.6	
Turnout		2,536	28.0	
Labour Co-op hold		Swing		

=== By-election 29 June 2006 ===
By-election 29 June 2006
Party	Candidate	Votes	%	±%
Labour	George Roberts	773	45.6	−2.2
Conservative	David Buckley	427	25.2	−8.2
BNP	Paul Hindley	283	16.7	+16.7
Green	Jean Smee	137	8.1	−10.7
Liberal Democrats	Peter Ball-Foster	75	4.4	+4.4
Majority		346	20.4	
Turnout		1,695	18.8	
Labour hold		Swing		

=== May 2006 ===
2006
Party	Candidate	Votes	%	±%
Labour	Kevin Welsh	1,219	47.84	
Conservative	Terence Shepherd	850	33.36	
Green	Jean Smee	479	18.80	
Majority		369	14.48	
Turnout		2,548	28	
Labour hold		Swing		

=== June 2004 ===
2004
Party	Candidate	Votes	%	±%
Labour	Bernard Walsh	1,472	45.5	
Labour	Frank Robinson	1,434		
Labour	Kevin Welsh	1,376		
Conservative	David Buckley	1,104	34.2	
Conservative	Yvonne Holt	987		
Conservative	Kevin Hartley	964		
Green	Michael Smee	656	20.3	
Majority			35.1	
Turnout				
