= Denton North East =

Denton North East (Tameside)
- Electoral ward
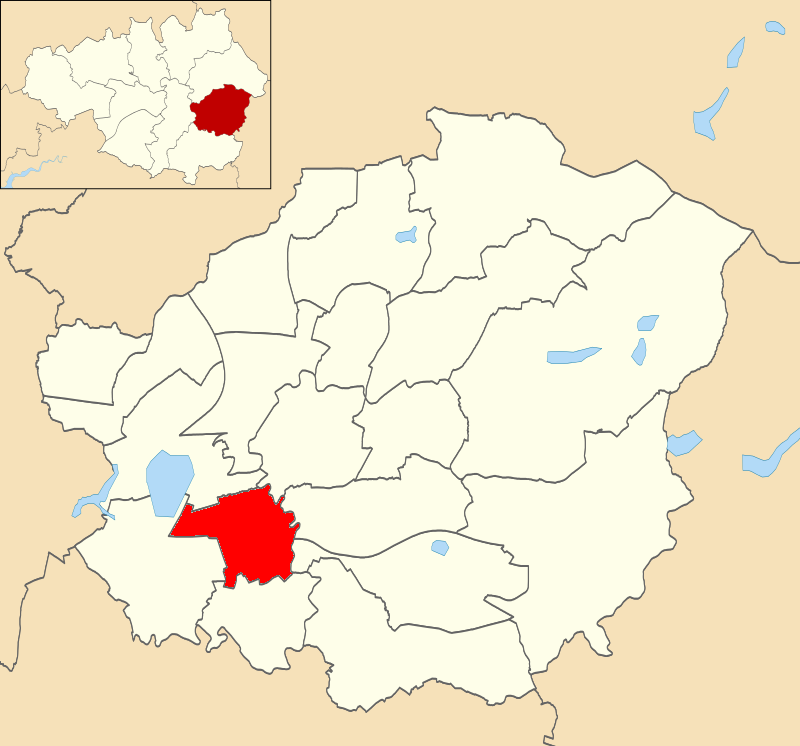
- Denton North East within Tameside

- Coat of arms
- Motto: Industry and Integrity
- Interactive map of Denton North East (Tameside)
- Coordinates: 53.4569°N 2.1093°W
- Country: United Kingdom
- Constituent country: England
- Region: North West England
- County: Greater Manchester
- Metropolitan borough: Tameside
- Created: 2004
- Named after: Denton

Government UK Parliament constituency: Gorton and Denton
  - Type: Unicameral
  - Body: Tameside Metropolitan Borough Council
  - Leader of the Council: Eleanor Wills (Labour)
  - Councillor: Vincent Ricci (Independent)
  - Councillor: Allison Gwynne (Labour)
  - Councillor: Aron Webb (Reform UK)

Denton North East is an electoral ward of Tameside, England. It is represented in Westminster by Hannah Spencer (Green) MP for Gorton and Denton

== Councillors ==
The ward is represented by three councillors: Vincent Ricci (Ind), Allison Gwynne (Lab), and Aaron Webb (Ref)

Election	Councillor	Councillor	Councillor
2004	Vincent Ricci (Lab)	Allison Gwynne (Lab)	Martin Wareing (Lab)
2006	Vincent Ricci (Lab)	Allison Gwynne (Lab)	Martin Wareing (Lab)
2007	Vincent Ricci (Lab)	Alison Gwynne (Lab)	Martin Wareing (Lab)
2008	Vincent Ricci (Lab)	Alison Gwynne (Lab)	Martin Wareing (Lab)
By-election; 30 July 2009	Vincent Ricci (Lab)	Allison Gwynne (Lab)	Denise Ward (Lab)
2010	Vincent Ricci (Lab)	Allison Gwynne (Lab)	Denise Ward (Lab)
2011	Vincent Ricci (Lab)	Allison Gwynne (Lab)	Denise Ward (Lab)
2012	Vincent Ricci (Lab)	Allison Gwynne (Lab)	Denise Ward (Lab)
2014	Vincent Ricci (Lab)	Allison Gwynne (Lab)	Denise Ward (Lab)
2015	Vincent Ricci (Lab)	Allison Gwynne (Lab)	Denise Ward (Lab)
2016	Vincent Ricci (Lab)	Allison Gwynne (Lab)	Denise Ward (Lab)
2018	Vincent Ricci (Lab)	Allison Gwynne (Lab)	Denise Ward (Lab)

indicates seat up for re-election. indicates seat won in by-election.

== Elections in 2010s ==
=== May 2019 ===
2019
Party	Candidate	Votes	%	±%
Labour	Allison Gwynne*	1,064	54	+2.19
Conservative	Dawn Lesley Cobb	554	28	−4
Green	Benjamin Hart	360	18	
Turnout		1,978		
Labour hold		Swing		

=== May 2018 ===
2018
Party	Candidate	Votes	%	±%
Labour	Vincent Ricci*	1,375	60	
Conservative	Dawn Cobb	747	32	
Liberal Democrats	Jen Neild	177	8	
Turnout		2,299		
Labour hold		Swing		

=== May 2016 ===
2016
Party	Candidate	Votes	%	±%
Labour	Denise Ward	1,505	55.70	
UKIP	Dennis Connor	755	27.94	
Conservative	Dawn Cobb	442	16.36	
Majority		750	27.76	
Turnout		2,702	32	
Labour hold		Swing		

=== May 2015 ===
2015
Party	Candidate	Votes	%	±%
Labour	Allison Gwynne	2,560	51.81	
UKIP	Dennis Connor	1,219	24.67	
Conservative	Carol White	918	18.58	
Green	Gerard Boyd	244	4.94	
Majority		1,341	27.14	
Turnout		4,941	57	
Labour hold		Swing		

=== May 2014 ===
2014
Party	Candidate	Votes	%	±%
Labour	Vincent Ricci	1,251	46.32	
UKIP	Dennis Connor	906	33.54	
Conservative	Carol White	344	12.74	
Green	Gerard Boyd	200	7.40	
Majority		345	12.77	
Turnout		2,701	31	
Labour hold		Swing		

=== May 2012 ===
2012
Party	Candidate	Votes	%	±%
Labour	Denise Ward	1,601	63.63	+18.18
Conservative	Rachel Marshall	397	15.78	−20.61
UKIP	Joanna Herod	339	13.47	N/A
Green	Stephen Boyd	179	7.11	N/A
Majority		1,204	47.85	
Turnout		2,521	29.5	−0.7
Labour hold		Swing		

=== May 2011 ===
2011
Party	Candidate	Votes	%	±%
Labour	Allison Gwynne	1,871	63.29	
Conservative	Christine Walters	639	21.62	
UKIP	Anthony Misell	268	9.07	
Green	Gerard Boyd	178	6.02	
Majority		1,232	41.68	
Turnout		2,956	35	
Labour hold		Swing		

=== May 2010 ===
2010
Party	Candidate	Votes	%	±%
Labour	Vincent Ricci	2,656	53.07	
Conservative	David Southward	1,336	26.69	
BNP	Rosalind Gauci	434	8.67	
UKIP	Michelle Harrison	334	6.67	
Green	Gerard Boyd	245	4.90	
Majority		1,320	26.37	
Turnout		5,005	60	
Labour hold		Swing		

== Elections in 2000s ==
=== By-election 30 July 2009 ===
By-election 30 July 2009
Party	Candidate	Votes	%	±%
Labour	Denise Ward	1,258	47.8	+2.3
Conservative	Floyd Paterson	660	25.1	−11.3
BNP	Rosalind Gauci	358	13.6	+13.6
UKIP	John Cooke	193	7.3	+7.3
Green	Rachell Lucas	164	6.2	+6.
Majority		598	22.7	
Turnout		2,633	31.5	
Labour hold		Swing		

=== May 2008 ===
2008
Party	Candidate	Votes	%	±%
Labour	Martin Wareing	1,139	45.45	
Conservative	Georgina Greenwood	912	36.39	
Liberal Democrats	Shaun O'Rourke	455	18.16	
Majority		227	9.06	
Turnout		2,506	30	
Labour hold		Swing		

=== May 2007 ===
2007
Party	Candidate	Votes	%	±%
Labour	Allison Gwynne	1,395	55.1	
Conservative	Georgina Helena Greenwood	719	28.4	
Liberal Democrats	Shaun O’Rourke	419	16.5	
Majority		676	26.7	
Turnout		2,533	30.6	
Labour hold		Swing		

=== May 2006 ===
2006
Party	Candidate	Votes	%	±%
Labour	Vincent Ricci	1,364	57.41	
Conservative	Anthony Kershaw	1,012	42.59	
Majority		352	14.81	
Turnout		2,376	29	
Labour hold		Swing		

=== June 2004 ===
2004
Party	Candidate	Votes	%	±%
Labour	Martin Wareing	1,463	42.3	
Labour	Allison Gwynne	1,441		
Labour	Vincent Ricci	1,291		
Liberal Democrats	Alan Yates	1,012	29.3	
Conservative	Shirley Booth	982	28.4	
Conservative	Georgina Greenwood	967		
Majority				
Turnout			34.9	
