= Longdendale (ward) =

Longdendale (Tameside)
- Electoral ward
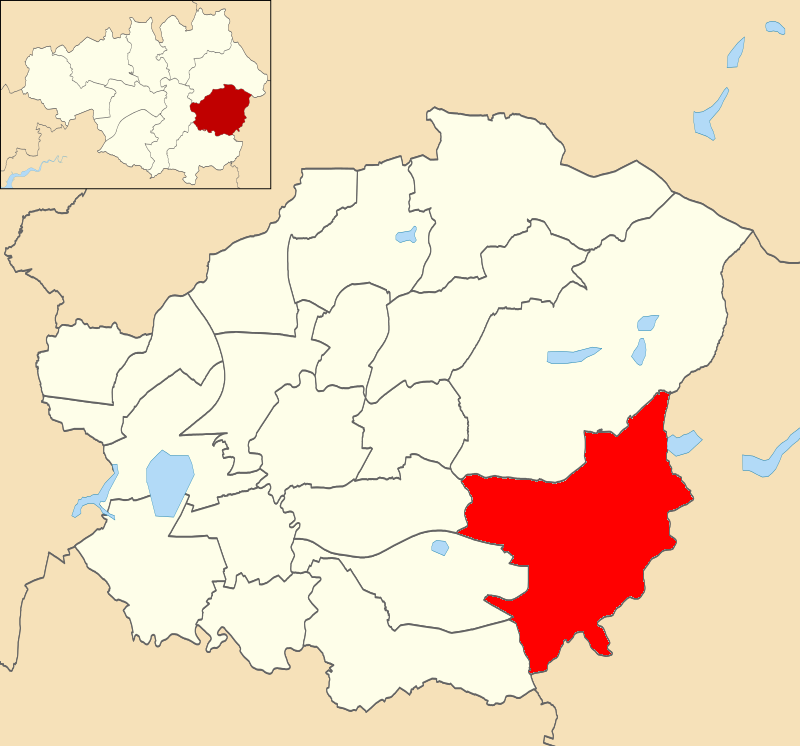
- Longdendale within Tameside

- Coat of arms
- Motto(s): Industry and Integrity
- Interactive map of Longdendale (Tameside)
- Coordinates: 53.4571°N 2.0127°W
- Country: United Kingdom
- Constituent country: England
- Region: North West England
- County: Greater Manchester
- Metropolitan borough: Tameside
- Created: 2004
- Named for: Stalybridge and Hyde

Government UK Parliament constituency: Stalybridge and Hyde
  - Type: Unicameral
  - Body: Tameside Metropolitan Borough Council
  - Leader of the Council: Brenda Warrington (Labour)
  - Councillor: Janet Cooper (Labour)
  - Councillor: Jacqueline Owen (Labour Co-operative)
  - Councillor: Jacqueline North (Labour)

Longdendale is an electoral ward of Tameside, England. It is represented in Westminster by Jonathan Reynolds Labour Co-operative MP for Stalybridge and Hyde.

== Councillors ==
The ward is represented by three councillors: Janet Cooper (Lab), Gillian Peet (Lab Co-op), and Chris Buglass (Lab).

Election	Councillor	Councillor	Councillor
2004	Roy Oldham (Lab)	Peter Bibby (Lab)	Sean Parker-Perry (Lab Co-op)
2006	Roy Oldham (Lab)	Peter Bibby (Lab)	Sean Parker-Perry (Lab Co-op)
2007	Roy Oldham (Lab)	Jonathan Reynolds (Lab Co-op)	Sean Parker-Perry (Lab Co-op)
2008	Roy Oldham (Lab)	Jonathan Reynolds (Lab Co-op)	Sean Parker-Perry (Lab Co-op)
2010	Roy Oldham (Lab)	Jonathan Reynolds (Lab Co-op)	Sean Parker-Perry (Lab Co-op)
By-election; 30 September 2010	Janet Cooper (Lab)	Jonathan Reynolds (Lab Co-op)	Sean Parker-Perry (Lab Co-op)
2011	Janet Cooper (Lab)	Gillian Peet (Lab Co-op)	Sean Parker-Perry (Lab Co-op)
2012	Janet Cooper (Lab)	Gillian Peet (Lab Co-op)	Adam White (Lab)
2014	Janet Cooper (Lab)	Gillian Peet (Lab Co-op)	Adam White (Lab)
2015	Janet Cooper (Lab)	Gillian Peet (Lab Co-op)	Adam White (Lab)
2016	Janet Cooper (Lab)	Gillian Peet (Lab Co-op)	Chris Buglass (Lab)
2018	Janet Cooper (Lab)	Gillian Peet (Lab Co-op)	Chris Buglass (Lab)

indicates seat up for re-election. indicates seat won in by-election.

== Elections in 2010s ==
=== May 2018 ===
2018
Party	Candidate	Votes	%	±%
Labour	Janet Cooper*	1,286		
Conservative	Liam Tomlinson	746		
Green	Irene Brierley	273		
Turnout		2,311	29.3	
Labour hold		Swing		

=== May 2016 ===
2016
Party	Candidate	Votes	%	±%
Labour	Chris Buglass	1,261	48.11	
Conservative	David Tyler	784	29.91	
UKIP	Michael Booth	400	15.26	
Green	Irene Brierley	176	6.71	
Majority		477	18.20	
Turnout		2,621	34	
Labour hold		Swing		

=== May 2015 ===
2015
Party	Candidate	Votes	%	±%
Labour Co-op	Gillian Peet	2,228	48.58	
Conservative	David Tyler	1,741	37.96	
Green	Brierley Irene	617	13.45	
Majority		487	10.62	
Turnout		4,586	58	
Labour Co-op hold		Swing		

=== May 2014 ===
2014
Party	Candidate	Votes	%	±%
Labour	Janet Cooper	1,185	42.43	
Conservative	David Tyler	733	26.24	
UKIP	Kevin Misell	635	22.74	
Green	John Kelly	240	8.59	
Majority		452	16.18	
Turnout		2,793	36	
Labour hold		Swing		

=== May 2012 ===
2012
Party	Candidate	Votes	%	±%
Labour	Adam White	1,407	53.76	+8.20
Conservative	Rob Adlard	731	27.93	−8.67
Green	Damian Mendes-Kelly	250	9.55	−1.25
UKIP	Kevin Misell	229	8.75	+1.72
Majority		676	25.83	
Turnout		2,630	33.7	−3.9
Labour hold		Swing		

=== May 2011 ===
2011
Party	Candidate	Votes	%	±%
Labour Co-op	Gillian Peet	1,591	49.73	
Conservative	Robert Adlard	1,209	37.79	
UKIP	Kevin Misell	206	6.44	
Green	Melanie Roberts	193	6.03	
Majority		382	11.94	
Turnout		3,199	41	
Labour Co-op hold		Swing		

=== By-election 30 September 2010 ===
By-election 30 September 2010
Party	Candidate	Votes	%	±%
Labour	Janet Cooper	1,275	48.96	
Conservative	Robert Adlard	1083	41.59	
Green	Melaine Roberts	99	3.80	
BNP	Anthony Jones	80	3.07	
UKIP	Kevin Misell	67	2.57	
Majority		192	7.37	
Turnout		2,604	33	
Labour hold		Swing		

=== May 2010 ===
2010
Party	Candidate	Votes	%	±%
Labour	Roy Oldham	2,084	43.72	
Conservative	Peter Hayes	1,812	38.01	
UKIP	Kevin Misell	445	9.34	
Green	Melanie Roberts	426	8.94	
Majority		272	5.71	
Turnout		4,767	62	
Labour hold		Swing		

== Elections in 2000s ==
=== May 2008 ===
2008
Party	Candidate	Votes	%	±%
Labour Co-op	Sean Parker-Perry	1,316	45.57	
Conservative	Sue Barker	1,057	36.60	
Green	Ruth Bergan	312	10.80	
UKIP	Kevin Misell	203	7.03	
Majority		259	8.97	
Turnout		2,888	38	
Labour Co-op hold		Swing		

=== May 2007 ===
2007
Party	Candidate	Votes	%	±%
Labour Co-op	Jonathan Reynolds	1,500	54.3	
Conservative	Dorothy Cartwright	783	28.3	
Green	Melanie Roberts	250	9.0	
UKIP	Kevin Misell	231	8.4	
Majority		717	25.9	
Turnout		2,764	37.0	
Labour Co-op hold		Swing		

=== May 2006 ===
2006
Party	Candidate	Votes	%	±%
Labour	Roy Oldham	1,429	51.48	
Conservative	Wendy Ince	915	32.96	
BNP	Beverley Jones	432	15.56	
Majority		514	18.52	
Turnout		2,776	37	
Labour hold		Swing		

=== June 2004 ===
2004
Party	Candidate	Votes	%	±%
Labour	Sean Parker-Perry	1,661	50.9	
Labour	Peter Bibby	1,641		
Labour	Samuel Roy Oldham	1,499		
Conservative	Wendy Barker	1,085	33.2	
Conservative	Terence Shepherd	1,037		
BNP	Beverley Jones	520	15.9	
Majority				
Turnout			40.4	
