= Denton South =

Denton South (Tameside)
- Electoral ward
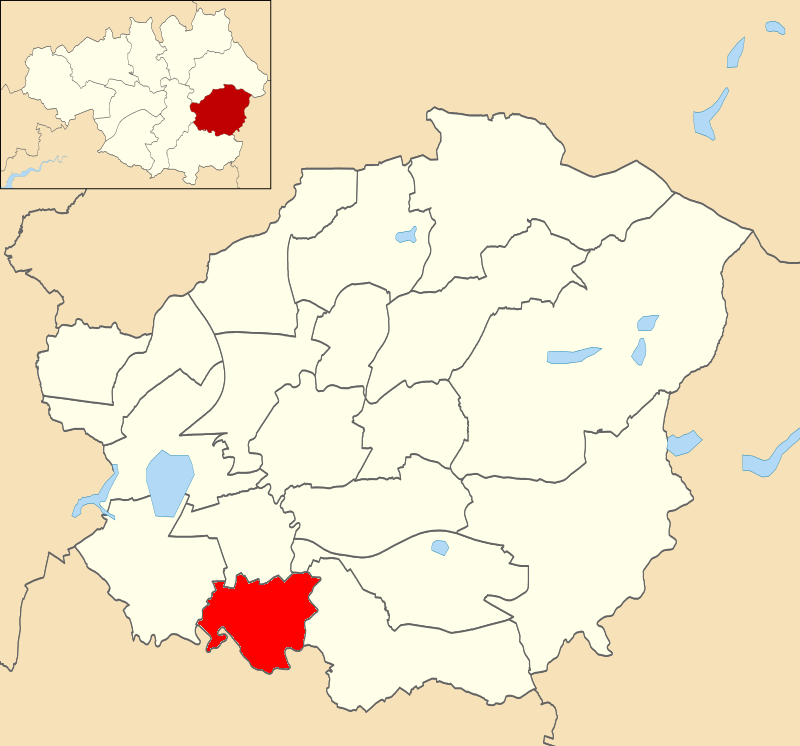
- Denton South within Tameside

- Coat of arms
- Motto: Industry and Integrity
- Interactive map of Denton South (Tameside)
- Coordinates: 53.4424°N 2.1048°W
- Country: United Kingdom
- Constituent country: England
- Region: North West England
- County: Greater Manchester
- Metropolitan borough: Tameside
- Created: 2004
- Named after: Denton, Greater Manchester

Government UK Parliament constituency: Gorton and Denton
  - Type: Unicameral
  - Body: Tameside Metropolitan Borough Council
  - Leader of the Council: Eleanor Wills (Labour)
  - Councillor: Jack Naylor (Independent)
  - Councillor: George Newton (Independent)
  - Councillor: Audra Murray (Reform UK)

Denton South is an electoral ward of Tameside, England. It is represented in Westminster by Hannah Spencer (Green) MP for Gorton and Denton

== Councillors ==
The ward is represented by three councillors: Jack Naylor (Ind), , George Newton (Ind) and Audra Murray (Reform)

Election	Councillor	Councillor	Councillor
2004	Arthur Grundy (Lab)	Andrew Doubleday (Lab)	Margaret Downs (Lab)
2006	Arthur Grundy (Lab)	Andrew Doubleday (Lab)	Margaret Downs (Lab)
By-election; 29 June 2006	Walter Downs (Lab)	Andrew Doubleday (Lab)	Margaret Downs (Lab)
2007	Walter Downs (Lab)	Andrew Doubleday (Lab)	Margaret Downs (Lab)
2008	Walter Downs (Lab)	Andrew Doubleday (Lab)	Margaret Downs (Lab)
2010	Claire Francis (Lab)	Andrew Doubleday (Lab)	Margaret Downs (Lab)
2011	Claire Francis (Lab)	Michael Fowler (Lab)	Margaret Downs (Lab)
2012	Claire Francis (Lab)	Michael Fowler (Lab)	Margaret Downs (Lab)
2014	Claire Francis (Lab)	Michael Fowler (Lab)	Margaret Downs (Lab)
2015	Claire Francis (Lab)	Michael Fowler (Lab)	Margaret Downs (Lab)
2016	Claire Reid (née Francis) (Lab)	Michael Fowler (Lab)	George Newton (Lab)
2018	Claire Reid (Lab)	Michael Fowler (Lab)	George Newton (Lab)
2019	Claire Reid (Lab)	Jack Naylor (Lab)	George Newton (Lab)

indicates seat up for re-election. indicates seat won in by-election.

== Elections in 2010s ==
=== May 2018 ===
2018
Party	Candidate	Votes	%	±%
Labour	Claire Reid*	1,582	67	
Conservative	Aimee Lumley	561	24	
Monster Raving Loony	Farmin Dave	206	9	
Turnout		2,354	28	
Labour hold		Swing		

=== May 2016 ===
2016
Party	Candidate	Votes	%	±%
Labour	George Newton	1,559	50.11	
Independent	Carl Simmons	1,001	32.18	
UKIP	Adrienne Shaw	354	11.38	
Conservative	Carol White	197	6.33	
Majority		558	17.94	
Turnout		3,111	37	
Labour hold		Swing		

=== May 2015 ===
2015
Party	Candidate	Votes	%	±%
Labour	Mike Fowler	2,092	43.59	
Independent	Carl Simmons	1,152	24.01	
UKIP	Adrienne Shaw	719	14.98	
Conservative	Zoe Gallacher	654	13.63	
Green	Mark Stanfield	132	2.75	
TUSC	Dean Kavanagh	50	1.04	
Majority		940	19.59	
Turnout		4,799	57	
Labour hold		Swing		

=== May 2014 ===
2014
Party	Candidate	Votes	%	±%
Labour	Claire Francis	1,160	41.88	
Independent	Carl Simmons	1,085	39.17	
Conservative	Jacob Sutcliffe	342	12.35	
Green	Michael Smee	92	3.32	
TUSC	Dean Kavanagh	91	3.29	
Majority		75	2.71	
Turnout		2,770	33	
Labour hold		Swing		

=== May 2012 ===
2012
Party	Candidate	Votes	%	±%
Labour	Margaret Downs	1,369	51.20	−6.33
Independent	Carl Simmons	675	25.24	N/A
UKIP	Adrienne Bennett	302	11.29	N/A
Conservative	Stephen Roden	250	9.35	−33.12
Green	Noel Woodhead	78	2.92	N/A
Majority		694	25.95	
Turnout		2,682	31.8	+2.2
Labour hold		Swing		

=== May 2011 ===
2011
Party	Candidate	Votes	%	±%
Labour	Michael Fowler	1,628	54.83	
Conservative	Steve Roden	545	18.36	
Independent	Carl Simmons	471	15.86	
UKIP	Adrienne Bennett	325	10.95	
Majority		1,083	36.48	
Turnout		2,969	35	
Labour hold		Swing		

=== May 2010 ===
2010
Party	Candidate	Votes	%	±%
Labour	Claire Francis	2,671	56.73	
Conservative	Steve Roden	1,476	31.35	
BNP	Stephen Taylor	561	11.92	
Majority		1,195	25.38	
Turnout		4,708	57	
Labour hold		Swing		

== Elections in 2000s ==
=== May 2008 ===
2008
Party	Candidate	Votes	%	±%
Labour	Margaret Downs	1,421	57.53	
Conservative	Thomas Jones	1,049	42.47	
Majority		372	15.06	
Turnout		2,470	30	
Labour hold		Swing		

=== May 2007 ===
2007
Party	Candidate	Votes	%	±%
Labour	Andrew Doubleday	1,427	57.5	
Conservative	Thomas Meredith Jones	672	27.1	
BNP	David Lomas	384	15.5	
Majority		755	30.4	
Turnout		2,483	29.7	
Labour hold		Swing		

=== By-election 29 June 2006 ===
By-election 29 June 2006
Party	Candidate	Votes	%	±%
Labour	Walter Downs	900	52.2	−9.3
Conservative	Thomas Jones	346	20.1	−18.4
BNP	Anthony Jones	316	18.3	+18.3
Liberal Democrats	David Barber	115	6.7	+6.7
Green	Nigel Rolland	47	2.7	+2.7
Majority		554	32.1	
Turnout		1,724	20.5	
Labour hold		Swing		

=== May 2006 ===
2006
Party	Candidate	Votes	%	±%
Labour	Arthur Grundy	1,443	61.51	
Conservative	Thomas Jones	903	38.49	
Majority		540	23.02	
Turnout		2,346	28	
Labour hold		Swing		

=== June 2004 ===
2004
Party	Candidate	Votes	%	±%
Labour	Margaret Downs	1,672	37.1	
Labour	Andrew Doubleday	1,619		
Labour	Arthur Grundy	1,371		
Conservative	Thomas Jones	835	18.5	
Liberal Democrats	Mark Yates	802	17.8	
BNP	Anthony Jones	612	13.6	
Green	Steve Fisher	586	13.0	
Majority				
Turnout			38.0	
