= Hyde Newton =

Hyde Newton (Tameside)
- Electoral ward
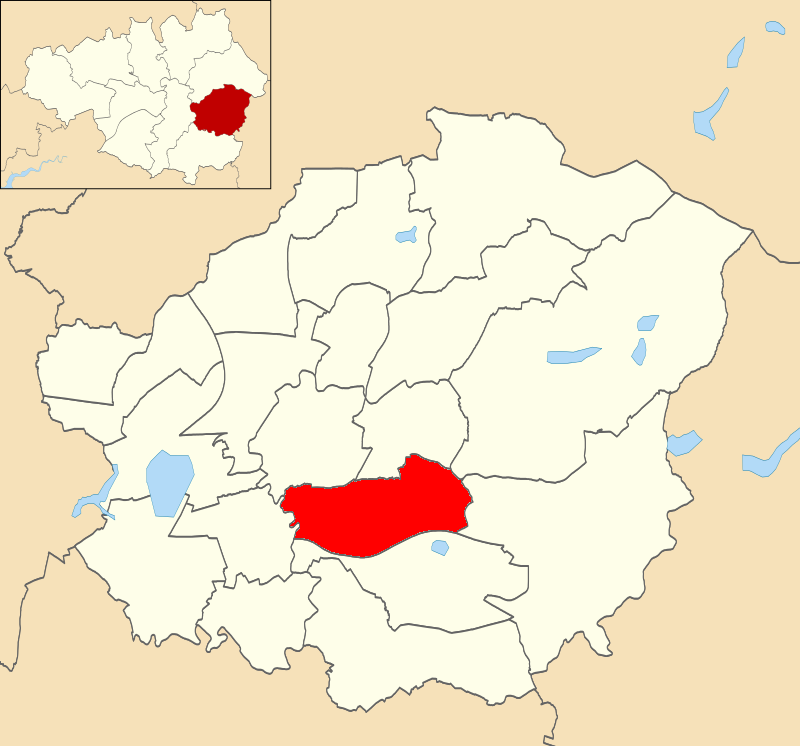
- Hyde Newton within Tameside

- Coat of arms
- Motto: Industry and Integrity
- Interactive map of Hyde Newton (Tameside)
- Coordinates: 53.4612°N 2.0708°W
- Country: United Kingdom
- Constituent country: England
- Region: North West England
- County: Greater Manchester
- Metropolitan borough: Tameside
- Created: 2004
- Named after: Stalybridge and Hyde

Government UK Parliament constituency: Stalybridge and Hyde
  - Type: Unicameral
  - Body: Tameside Metropolitan Borough Council
  - Leader of the Council: Brenda Warrington (Labour)
  - Councillor: Philip Fitzpatrick (Labour)
  - Councillor: Helen Bowden (Labour Co-operative)
  - Councillor: Peter Robinson (Labour Co-operative)

Hyde Newton is an electoral ward of Tameside, England. It is represented in Westminster by Jonathan Reynolds Labour Co-operative MP for Stalybridge and Hyde.

== Councillors ==
The ward is represented by three councillors: Philip Fitzpatrick (Lab), Helen Bowden (Lab Co-op), and Peter Robinson (Lab Co-op).

Election	Councillor	Councillor	Councillor
2004	Margaret Oldham (Lab)	Joseph Fitzpatrick (Lab)	Peter Robinson (Lab Co-op)
2006	Margaret Oldham (Lab)	Joseph Fitzpatrick (Lab)	Peter Robinson (Lab Co-op)
2007	Margaret Oldham (Lab)	Helen Bowden (Lab Co-op)	Peter Robinson (Lab Co-op)
2008	Margaret Oldham (Lab)	Helen Bowden (Lab Co-op)	Peter Robinson (Lab Co-op)
By-election; 5 February 2009	Philip Fitzpatrick (Lab)	Helen Bowden (Lab Co-op)	Peter Robinson (Lab Co-op)
2010	Philip Fitzpatrick (Lab)	Helen Bowden (Lab Co-op)	Peter Robinson (Lab Co-op)
2011	Philip Fitzpatrick (Lab)	Helen Bowden (Lab Co-op)	Peter Robinson (Lab Co-op)
2012	Philip Fitzpatrick (Lab)	Helen Bowden (Lab Co-op)	Peter Robinson (Lab Co-op)
2014	Philip Fitzpatrick (Lab)	Helen Bowden (Lab Co-op)	Peter Robinson (Lab Co-op)
2015	Philip Fitzpatrick (Lab)	Helen Bowden (Lab Co-op)	Peter Robinson (Lab Co-op)
2016	Philip Fitzpatrick (Lab)	Helen Bowden (Lab Co-op)	Peter Robinson (Lab Co-op)
2018	Philip Fitzpatrick (Lab)	Helen Bowden (Lab Co-op)	Peter Robinson (Lab Co-op)

indicates seat up for re-election. indicates seat won in by-election.

== Elections in 2010s ==
=== May 2018 ===
2018
Party	Candidate	Votes	%	±%
Labour	Philip Fitzpatrick*	1,336		
Conservative	Michael Gibbins	827		
Liberal Democrats	Peter Ball-Foster	194		
Green	Michael Baker	181		
Turnout		2,547	24.3	
Labour hold		Swing		

=== May 2016 ===
2016
Party	Candidate	Votes	%	±%
Labour Co-op	Peter Robinson	1,587	52.55	
UKIP	Philip Chadwick	1,132	37.48	
Green	Andrew Highton	301	9.97	
Majority		455	15.07	
Turnout		3,020	30	
Labour Co-op hold		Swing		

=== May 2015 ===
2015
Party	Candidate	Votes	%	±%
Labour Co-op	Helen Bowden	2,816	51.54	
UKIP	Philip Chadwick	1,993	36.48	
Green	Andrew Highton	655	11.99	
Majority		823	15.06	
Turnout		5,464	54	
Labour Co-op hold		Swing		

=== May 2014 ===
2014
Party	Candidate	Votes	%	±%
Labour	Philip Fitzpatrick	1,406	46.79	
UKIP	Gail Jones	962	32.01	
Conservative	Craig Halliday	415	13.81	
Green	Andrew Highton	222	7.39	
Majority		444	14.78	
Turnout		3,005	30	
Labour hold		Swing		

=== May 2012 ===
2012
Party	Candidate	Votes	%	±%
Labour Co-op	Peter Robinson	1,779	60.84	+24.32
Conservative	Craig Halliday	429	14.67	−9.11
UKIP	Ian Horton	301	10.29	N/A
BNP	Rosalind Gauchi	241	8.24	−19.24
Green	Jacintha Manchester	174	5.95	N/A
Majority		1,350	46.17	
Turnout		2,928	29.5	−3.8
Labour Co-op hold		Swing		

=== May 2011 ===
2011
Party	Candidate	Votes	%	±%
Labour Co-op	Helen Bowden	1,890	57.01	
Conservative	Craig Halliday	717	21.63	
BNP	Rosalind Gauci	335	10.11	
UKIP	Ian Horton	239	7.21	
Green	Jacintha Manchester	134	4.04	
Majority		1,173	35.38	
Turnout		3,315	33	
Labour Co-op hold		Swing		

=== May 2010 ===
2010
Party	Candidate	Votes	%	±%
Labour	Philip Fitzpatrick	2,230	41.50	
Conservative	James Gradwell-Spencer	1,275	23.73	
Liberal Democrats	Maria Turner	864	16.08	
BNP	Nigel Byrne	722	13.44	
UKIP	Janette Durward	174	3.24	
Green	Jacintha Manchester	108	2.01	
Majority		955	17.77	
Turnout		5,373	56	
Labour hold		Swing		

== Elections in 2000s ==
=== By-election 5 February 2009 ===
By-election 5 February 2009
Party	Candidate	Votes	%	±%
Labour	Philip Fitzpatrick	1,379	45.6	+9.0
BNP	Rosalind Gauci	889	29.4	+1.9
Conservative	John Welsh	485	16.0	−7.8
Liberal Democrats	Peter Ball-Foster	172	5.7	−6.5
Green	Nigel Rolland	69	2.3	+2.3
UKIP	Angela McManus	33	1.1	+1.1
Majority		490	16.2	
Turnout		3,027	32.0	
Labour hold		Swing		

=== May 2008 ===
2008
Party	Candidate	Votes	%	±%
Labour Co-op	Peter Robinson	1,124	36.52	
BNP	Nigel Byrne	846	27.49	
Conservative	John Welsh	732	23.78	
Liberal Democrats	Peter Ball-Foster	376	12.22	
Majority		278	9.03	
Turnout		3,078	33	
Labour Co-op hold		Swing		

=== May 2007 ===
2007
Party	Candidate	Votes	%	±%
Labour Co-op	Helen Bowden	1,252	42.0	
BNP	Nigel Christian Byrne	719	24.1	
Conservative	Thomas David Welsby	544	18.2	
Liberal Democrats	Peter Stanley Ball-Foster	329	11.0	
Green	Michelle Valentine	137	4.6	
Majority		533	17.9	
Turnout		2,981	33.0	
Labour Co-op hold		Swing		

=== May 2006 ===
2006
Party	Candidate	Votes	%	±%
Labour	Margaret Oldham	1,085	36.94	
BNP	Nigel Byrne	761	25.91	
Conservative	Thomas Welsby	552	18.79	
Liberal Democrats	Peter Ball-Foster	363	12.36	
Green	Michelle Valentine	176	5.99	
Majority		324	11.03	
Turnout		2,937	33	
Labour hold		Swing		

=== June 2004 ===
2004
Party	Candidate	Votes	%	±%
Labour Co-op	Peter Robinson	1,482	34,1	
Labour	Joseph Fitzpatrick	1,363		
Labour	Margaret Oldham	1,296		
Liberal Democrats	Peter Ball-Foster	1,059	24.4	
Conservative	Thomas Welsby	992	22.8	
BNP	Mark Ward	814	18.7	
Majority				
Turnout			37.4	
