= 2018 Tameside Metropolitan Borough Council election =

2018 local election in England

Map showing the results of the 2018 Tameside Metropolitan Borough Council election

The 2018 Tameside Metropolitan Borough Council election took place on 3 May 2018 to elect members of Tameside Metropolitan Borough Council in England. This was on the same day as other local elections.

== Ward results ==
Asterisk denotes the sitting councillor.

=== Ashton Hurst ward ===
Ashton Hurst
| Party | Candidate | Votes | % | ±% |
|---|---|---|---|---|
| Labour | Dolores Lewis | 1,427 | 47.8 | ▲0.4 |
| Conservative | Paul Buckley* | 1384 | 46.4 | ▲2.8 |
| Green | Philip Blakeney | 173 | 5.8 | ▼3.2 |
| Turnout | | 2,987 | 33.6 | |
| Labour gain from Conservative | | Swing | | |

=== Ashton St. Michaels ward ===
Ashton St. Michael's
| Party | Candidate | Votes | % | ±% |
|---|---|---|---|---|
| Labour | Bill Fairfoull* | 1,396 | 65.6 | ▼4.5 |
| Conservative | Dot Buckley | 523 | 24.6 | ▼5.3 |
| Green | Hannah Smee | 210 | 9.9 | N/A |
| Turnout | | 2,139 | 24 | |
| Labour hold | | Swing | | |

=== Ashton Waterloo ward ===
Ashton Waterloo
| Party | Candidate | Votes | % | ±% |
|---|---|---|---|---|
| Labour | Vimal Choksi | 1,337 | 57.4 | ▼2.1 |
| Conservative | Kate Scott | 672 | 28.9 | ▲3.1 |
| Green | Lee Huntbach | 319 | 13.7 | ▼1.0 |
| Majority | | 665 | 28.5 | ▼5.2 |
| Registered electors | | 8,735 | | |
| Turnout | | 2,336 | 26.7 | ▼4.3 |
| Rejected ballots | | 8 | 0.3 | ▼0.5 |
| Labour hold | | Swing | ▼2.6 | |

=== Audenshaw ward ===
Audenshaw
| Party | Candidate | Votes | % | ±% |
|---|---|---|---|---|
| Labour | Oliver Ryan* | 1,581 | 55.3 | ▲10.0 |
| Conservative | Danny Mather | 922 | 32.2 | ▲5.7 |
| UKIP | Peter Harris | 195 | 6.8 | ▼15.6 |
| Green | Georgia Blakeney | 161 | 5.6 | ▲0.4 |
| Turnout | | 2,865 | 30 | |
| Labour hold | | Swing | | |

=== Denton North East ward ===
Denton North East
| Party | Candidate | Votes | % | ±% |
|---|---|---|---|---|
| Labour | Vincent Ricci* | 1,375 | 59.8 | ▲4.1 |
| Conservative | Dawn Cobb | 747 | 32.5 | ▲16.1 |
| Liberal Democrats | Jen Neild | 177 | 7.7 | N/A |
| Turnout | | 2,299 | | |
| Labour hold | | Swing | | |

=== Denton South ward ===
Denton South
| Party | Candidate | Votes | % | ±% |
|---|---|---|---|---|
| Labour | Claire Reid* | 1,582 | 67.3 | ▲17.2 |
| Conservative | Aimee Lumley | 561 | 23.9 | ▲17.6 |
| Monster Raving Loony | Farmin Dave | 206 | 8.8 | N/A |
| Turnout | | 2,354 | 28 | |
| Labour hold | | Swing | | |

=== Denton West ward ===
Denton West
| Party | Candidate | Votes | % | ±% |
|---|---|---|---|---|
| Labour | Michael Smith* | 1,730 | 60.2 | ▲1.1 |
| Conservative | Thomas Dunne | 777 | 27.1 | ▲11.6 |
| Green | Jean Smee | 365 | 12.7 | ▲7.3 |
| Turnout | | 2,883 | 30.4 | |
| Labour hold | | Swing | | |

=== Droylsden East ward ===
Droylsden East
| Party | Candidate | Votes | % | ±% |
|---|---|---|---|---|
| Labour | Sue Quinn* | 1,333 | 60.4 | ▲9.0 |
| Conservative | Matt Stevenson | 656 | 29.7 | ▲20.6 |
| Green | David Melvin | 149 | 6.7 | ▲0.8 |
| Liberal Democrats | Shaun Offerman | 70 | 3.2 | N/A |
| Turnout | | 2,213 | 24.7 | |
| Labour hold | | Swing | | |

=== Droylsden West ward ===
Droylsden West
| Party | Candidate | Votes | % | ±% |
|---|---|---|---|---|
| Labour | Barrie Holland* | 1,453 | 63.6 | ▼17.6 |
| Conservative | Declan Ruane | 362 | 15.8 | ▲4.0 |
| Green | Annie Train | 274 | 12.0 | ▲4.9 |
| UKIP | Maurice Jackson | 197 | 8.6 | N/A |
| Turnout | | 2,293 | 25.4 | |
| Labour hold | | Swing | | |

=== Dukinfield ward ===
Dukinfield
| Party | Candidate | Votes | % | ±% |
|---|---|---|---|---|
| Labour | Jackie Lane* | 1,427 | 61.5 | ▲8.8 |
| Conservative | Lucy Turner | 623 | 26.8 | ▲13.0 |
| Green | Julie Wood | 271 | 11.7 | ▲5.6 |
| Turnout | | 2,328 | 24.5 | |
| Labour hold | | Swing | | |

=== Dukinfield / Stalybridge ward ===
Dukinfield / Stalybridge
| Party | Candidate | Votes | % | ±% |
|---|---|---|---|---|
| Labour | Eleanor Wills* | 1,146 | 44.1 | ▼13.3 |
| Your Town, Our Town, Stalybridge Town | Dave Tate | 696 | 26.8 | N/A |
| Conservative | Les Browning | 622 | 24.0 | N/A |
| Green | Linda Freeman | 132 | 5.1 | N/A |
| Turnout | | 2,605 | 29.5 | |
| Labour hold | | Swing | | |

=== Hyde Godley ward ===
Hyde Godley
| Party | Candidate | Votes | % | ±% |
|---|---|---|---|---|
| Labour | Jim Fitzpatrick* | 1,254 | 53.3 | ▼1.1 |
| Conservative | Andrea Colbourne | 901 | 38.3 | ▲24.5 |
| Green | Philip King | 198 | 8.4 | N/A |
| Turnout | | 2,360 | 26 | |
| Labour hold | | Swing | | |

=== Hyde Newton ward ===
Hyde Newton
| Party | Candidate | Votes | % | ±% |
|---|---|---|---|---|
| Labour | Philip Fitzpatrick* | 1,336 | 52.6 | − |
| Conservative | Michael Gibbins | 827 | 32.6 | N/A |
| Liberal Democrats | Peter Ball-Foster | 194 | 7.6 | N/A |
| Green | Michael Baker | 181 | 7.1 | −2.9 |
| Turnout | | 2,547 | 24.3 | |
| Labour hold | | Swing | | |

=== Hyde Werneth ward ===
Hyde Werneth
| Party | Candidate | Votes | % | ±% |
|---|---|---|---|---|
| Conservative | Phil Chadwick | 1,631 | 48.8 | ▼2.4 |
| Labour | Andy Kinsey* | 1,422 | 42.6 | ▼6.2 |
| Green | Nina West | 155 | 4.6 | N/A |
| Liberal Democrats | Richard O'Brien | 131 | 3.9 | N/A |
| Turnout | | 3,348 | 37 | |
| Conservative gain from Labour | | Swing | | |

=== Longdendale ward ===
Longdendale
| Party | Candidate | Votes | % | ±% |
|---|---|---|---|---|
| Labour | Janet Cooper* | 1,286 | 55.8 | ▲7.7 |
| Conservative | Liam Tomlinson | 746 | 32.4 | ▲2.5 |
| Green | Irene Brierley | 273 | 11.8 | ▲5.1 |
| Turnout | | 2,311 | 29.3 | |
| Labour hold | | Swing | | |

=== Mossley ward ===
Mossley
| Party | Candidate | Votes | % | ±% |
|---|---|---|---|---|
| Labour | Stephen Homer | 1,145 | 40.8 | ▲1.4 |
| Mossley Independent Community Party | Lesley Bill | 721 | 25.7 | ▼0.7 |
| Independent | Dean Aylett | 359 | 12.8 | ▼11.5 |
| Conservative | Andrew Cooper | 319 | 11.4 | ▲0.3 |
| Green | Christine Clark | 174 | 6.2 | ▼5.5 |
| Liberal Democrats | Sally Ashe | 86 | 3.1 | ▼1.5 |
| Turnout | | 2,811 | 32 | |
| Labour hold | | Swing | | |

=== St Peter's ward ===
St Peter's
| Party | Candidate | Votes | % | ±% |
|---|---|---|---|---|
| Labour | Joyce Bowerman* | 1,922 | 77.8 | ▲6.3 |
| Conservative | Jeff McEwen | 349 | 14.1 | ▲2.7 |
| Green | Trevor Clarke | 201 | 8.1 | ▼1.4 |
| Turnout | | 2,479 | 26.2 | |
| Labour hold | | Swing | | |

=== Stalybridge North ward ===
Stalybridge North
| Party | Candidate | Votes | % | ±% |
|---|---|---|---|---|
| Labour | Sam Gosling | 1,123 | 41.1 | ▼10.8 |
| Conservative | David Tilbrook | 831 | 30.4 | ▼1.4 |
| Your Town, Our Town, Stalybridge Town | Lee Stafford | 666 | 24.4 | N/A |
| Green | Laura Dias De Almeida | 105 | 3.8 | ▼12.5 |
| Communist League | Hugo Wils | 6 | 0.2 | |
| Turnout | | 2,737 | 29 | |
| Labour hold | | Swing | | |

=== Stalybridge South ward ===
Stalybridge South
| Party | Candidate | Votes | % | ±% |
|---|---|---|---|---|
| Conservative | Liam Billington | 1,233 | 44.8 | ▼8.0 |
| Labour | Katy Flanagan | 834 | 30.3 | ▼5.7 |
| Your Town, Our Town, Stalybridge Town | Jennifer Brayne | 582 | 21.1 | N/A |
| Green | Amanda Hickling | 106 | 3.8 | ▼7.3 |
| Turnout | | 2,760 | 25 | |
| Conservative hold | | Swing | | |

== Changes between 2018 and 2019 ==
=== Ashton Waterloo by election 2018 ===
Cllr Catherine Piddington, last elected in 2016, died.

Ashton Waterloo by-election, 6 September 2018
| Party | Candidate | Votes | % | ±% |
|---|---|---|---|---|
| Labour | Pauline Hollinshead | 889 | 52.5 | ▼4.9 |
| Green | Lee Huntbach | 448 | 26.4 | ▲12.7 |
| Conservative | Therese Costello | 357 | 21.1 | ▼7.8 |
| Majority | | 441 | 26.1 | ▼2.4 |
| Registered electors | | 8,717 | | |
| Turnout | | 1,697 | 19.5 | ▼7.2 |
| Rejected ballots | | 3 | 0.2 | ▼0.1 |
| Labour hold | | Swing | ▼1.2 | |
