= Denton West =

Denton West (Tameside)
- Electoral ward
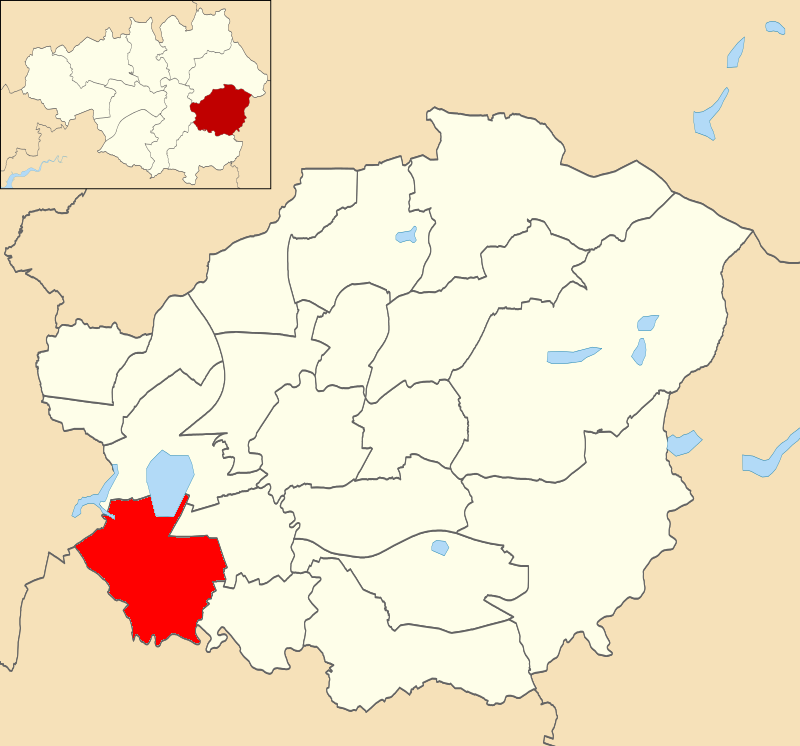
- Denton West within Tameside

- Coat of arms
- Motto: Industry and Integrity
- Interactive map of Denton West (Tameside)
- Coordinates: 53.4514°N 2.1354°W
- Country: United Kingdom
- Constituent country: England
- Region: North West England
- County: Greater Manchester
- Metropolitan borough: Tameside
- Created: 2004
- Named after: Denton

Government UK Parliament constituency: Gorton and Denton
  - Type: Unicameral
  - Body: Tameside Metropolitan Borough Council
  - Leader of the Council: Eleanor Wills (Labour)
  - Councillor: Michael Smith (Labour)
  - Councillor: Dan Bennett (Reform UK)
  - Councillor: George Jones (Labour)

Denton West is an electoral ward of Tameside, England. It is represented in Westminster by Hannah Spencer Green MP for Gorton and Denton

== Councillors ==
The ward is represented by three councillors: Dan Bennett (Ref), Michael Smith (Lab), and George Jones (Lab).

| Election | Councillor | Councillor | Councillor |
|---|---|---|---|
| 2004 | Michael Smith (Lab) | Brenda Warrington (Lab) | Andrew Gwynne (Lab) |
| 2006 | Michael Smith (Lab) | Brenda Warrington (Lab) | Andrew Gwynne (Lab) |
| 2007 | Michael Smith (Lab) | Brenda Warrington (Lab) | Andrew Gwynne (Lab) |
| 2008 | Michael Smith (Lab) | Brenda Warrington (Lab) | Dawson Lane (Lab) |
| 2010 | Michael Smith (Lab) | Brenda Warrington (Lab) | Dawson Lane (Lab) |
| 2011 | Michael Smith (Lab) | Brenda Warrington (Lab) | Dawson Lane (Lab) |
| 2012 | Michael Smith (Lab) | Brenda Warrington (Lab) | Dawson Lane (Lab) |
| 2014 | Michael Smith (Lab) | Brenda Warrington (Lab) | Dawson Lane (Lab) |
| 2015 | Michael Smith (Lab) | Brenda Warrington (Lab) | Dawson Lane (Lab) |
| 2016 | Michael Smith (Lab) | Brenda Warrington (Lab) | Dawson Lane (Lab) |
| 2018 | Michael Smith (Lab) | Brenda Warrington (Lab) | Dawson Lane (Lab) |
| 2019 | Michael Smith (Lab) | Brenda Warrington (Lab) | Dawson Lane (Lab) |
| 2019 (By-election) | Michael Smith (Lab) | Brenda Warrington (Lab) | George Jones (Lab) |

Indicates seat up for election.

== Elections in 2010s ==
=== May 2023 ===
2023
| Party | Candidate | Votes | % | ±% |
|---|---|---|---|---|
| Labour | George Jones | 1,928 | 71 | |
| Labour | Brenda Warrington | 1,714 | 63 | |
| Labour | Michael Smith | 1,591 | 59 | |
| Conservative | Thomas Dunne | 607 | 22 | |
| Green | Christopher Parr | 518 | 19 | |
| Majority | | 1,321 | | |
| Majority | | 1,107 | | |
| Majority | | 984 | | |
| Turnout | | 2,715 | 29.9 | |
| Labour hold | | Swing | | |

=== May 2022 ===
2022
| Party | Candidate | Votes | % | ±% |
|---|---|---|---|---|
| Labour | Michael Smith | 1,788 | 66 | |
| Conservative | Matt Allen | 704 | 30 | |
| Green | Jean Smee | 220 | 8 | |
| Majority | | 1,084 | | |
| Turnout | | 2,646 | 30 | |
| Labour hold | | Swing | | |

=== May 2021 ===
2021
| Party | Candidate | Votes | % | ±% |
|---|---|---|---|---|
| Labour | George Alex Jones | 2,022 | 63 | |
| Conservative | Thomas Dunne | 973 | 30 | |
| Green | Jean Smee | 231 | 7 | |
| Majority | | 1,049 | | |
| Turnout | | 3,226 | 36 | |
| Labour hold | | Swing | | |

=== December 2019 By-election ===
2019
| Party | Candidate | Votes | % | ±% |
|---|---|---|---|---|
| Labour | George Alex Jones | 3,041 | 53 | |
| Conservative | Thomas Dunne | 2,120 | 37 | |
| Green | Jean Smee | 303 | 5 | |
| Liberal Democrats | Alice Sarah Mason-Power | 247 | 4 | |
| Majority | | 921 | | |
| Turnout | | 5,711 | 60 | |
| Labour hold | | Swing | | |

=== May 2019 ===
2019
| Party | Candidate | Votes | % | ±% |
|---|---|---|---|---|
| Labour | Brenda Warrington | 1,440 | 59 | |
| Conservative | Thomas Dunne | 550 | 22 | |
| Green | Jean Smee | 462 | 19 | |
| Majority | | 890 | | |
| Turnout | | 2,452 | 25.5 | |
| Labour hold | | Swing | | |

=== May 2018 ===
2018
| Party | Candidate | Votes | % | ±% |
|---|---|---|---|---|
| Labour | Michael Smith | 1,730 | 60 | |
| Conservative | Thomas Dunne | 777 | 27 | |
| Green | Jean Smee | 365 | 13 | |
| Majority | | 953 | | |
| Turnout | | 2,883 | 30.4 | |
| Labour hold | | Swing | | |

=== May 2016 ===
2016
| Party | Candidate | Votes | % | ±% |
|---|---|---|---|---|
| Labour | Dawson Lane | 1,936 | 59.13 | |
| UKIP | Max Bennett | 654 | 19.98 | |
| Conservative | Carl Edwards | 506 | 15.46 | |
| Green | Gareth Hayes | 178 | 5.44 | |
| Majority | | 1,282 | 39.16 | |
| Turnout | | 3,274 | 37 | |
| Labour hold | | Swing | | |

=== May 2015 ===
2015
| Party | Candidate | Votes | % | ±% |
|---|---|---|---|---|
| Labour | Brenda Warrington | 3,369 | 56.98 | |
| Conservative | Thomas Dunne | 1,843 | 31.17 | |
| Green | Gareth Hayes | 488 | 8.25 | |
| TUSC | Robert Heap | 213 | 3.60 | |
| Majority | | 1,526 | 25.81 | |
| Turnout | | 5,913 | 62 | |
| Labour hold | | Swing | | |

=== May 2014 ===
2014
| Party | Candidate | Votes | % | ±% |
|---|---|---|---|---|
| Labour | Michael Smith | 2,068 | 65.07 | |
| Conservative | Thomas Dunne | 778 | 24.48 | |
| Green | Jacintha Manchester | 332 | 10.45 | |
| Majority | | 1,290 | 40.59 | |
| Turnout | | 3,178 | 34 | |
| Labour hold | | Swing | | |

=== May 2012 ===
2012
| Party | Candidate | Votes | % | ±% |
|---|---|---|---|---|
| Labour | Dawson Lane | 2,052 | 65.90 | +15.69 |
| Conservative | Christine Marshall | 563 | 18.08 | −31.71 |
| UKIP | Michelle Harrison | 359 | 11.53 | N/A |
| Green | Simon Rollinson | 140 | 4.50 | N/A |
| Majority | | 1,489 | 47.82 | |
| Turnout | | 3,133 | 34 | −0.6 |
| Labour hold | | Swing | | |

=== May 2011 ===
2011
| Party | Candidate | Votes | % | ±% |
|---|---|---|---|---|
| Labour | Brenda Warrington | 2,378 | 64.39 | |
| Conservative | Floyd Paterson | 948 | 25.67 | |
| UKIP | Michelle Harrison | 367 | 9.94 | |
| Majority | | 1,430 | 38.72 | |
| Turnout | | 3,693 | 40 | |
| Labour hold | | Swing | | |

=== May 2010 ===
2010
| Party | Candidate | Votes | % | ±% |
|---|---|---|---|---|
| Labour | Michael Smith | 3,301 | 56.49 | |
| Conservative | Floyd Paterson | 1,758 | 30.09 | |
| BNP | Stephen Booth | 431 | 7.38 | |
| Green | Geoffrey Howard | 353 | 6.04 | |
| Majority | | 1,543 | 26.41 | |
| Turnout | | 5,843 | 64 | |
| Labour hold | | Swing | | |

== Elections in 2000s ==
=== May 2008 ===
2008
| Party | Candidate | Votes | % | ±% |
|---|---|---|---|---|
| Labour | Dawson Lane | 1,578 | 50.21 | |
| Conservative | Joan Howarth | 1,565 | 49.79 | |
| Majority | | 13 | 0.41 | |
| Turnout | | 3,143 | 35 | |
| Labour hold | | Swing | | |

=== May 2007 ===
2007
| Party | Candidate | Votes | % | ±% |
|---|---|---|---|---|
| Labour | Brenda Warrington | 1,888 | 60.8 | |
| Conservative | Joan Mary Howarth | 1,217 | 39.2 | |
| Majority | | 671 | 21.6 | |
| Turnout | | 3,105 | 34.4 | |
| Labour hold | | Swing | | |

=== May 2006 ===
2006
| Party | Candidate | Votes | % | ±% |
|---|---|---|---|---|
| Labour | Michael Smith | 1,865 | 58.78 | |
| Conservative | Joan Howarth | 1,308 | 41.22 | |
| Majority | | 557 | 17.55 | |
| Turnout | | 3,173 | 35 | |
| Labour hold | | Swing | | |

=== June 2004 ===
2004
| Party | Candidate | Votes | % | ±% |
|---|---|---|---|---|
| Labour | Andrew Gwynne | 2,218 | 47.8 | |
| Labour | Brenda Warrington | 1,966 | | |
| Labour | Michael Smith | 1,751 | | |
| Conservative | Joan Howarth | 1,272 | 27.4 | |
| Conservative | Antony Kershaw | 1,143 | | |
| Conservative | Michael Foy | 1,083 | | |
| Green | Gerard Boyd | 608 | 13.1 | |
| Liberal Democrats | Carol Yates | 545 | 11.7 | |
| Majority | | | | |
| Turnout | | | 42.5 | |
