= Andrew Gwynne =

British politician (born 1974)

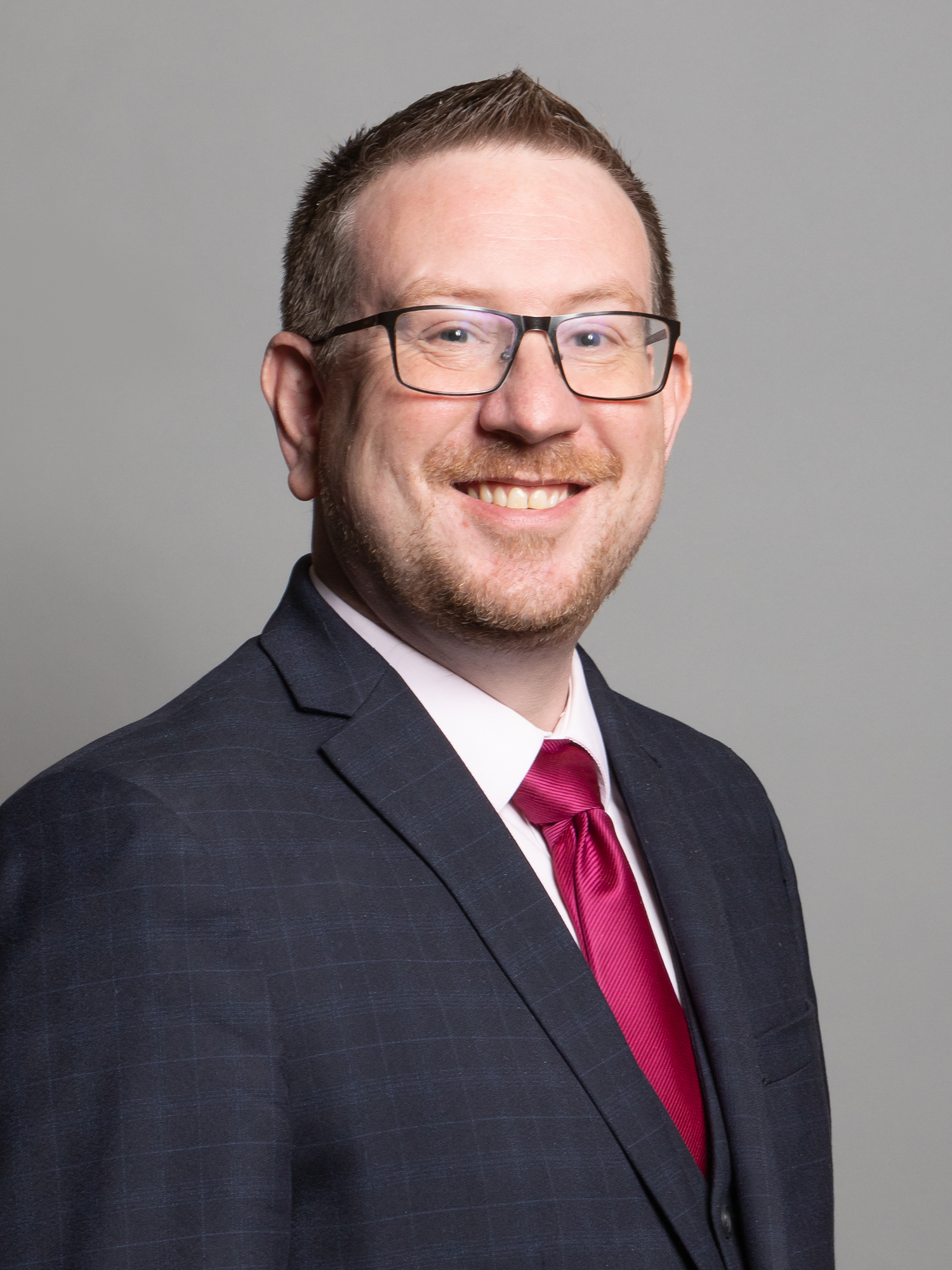
- Official portrait, 2020

Parliamentary Under-Secretary of State for Public Health and Prevention
- In office 9 July 2024 – 8 February 2025
- Prime Minister: Keir Starmer
- Preceded by: Andrea Leadsom
- Succeeded by: Ashley Dalton

Shadow Secretary of State for Communities and Local Government
- In office 14 June 2017 – 6 April 2020
- Leader: Jeremy Corbyn
- Preceded by: Roberta Blackman-Woods
- Succeeded by: Steve Reed

Labour Party Co-National Campaign Coordinator
- In office 10 February 2017 – 5 April 2020 Serving with Ian Lavery
- Leader: Jeremy Corbyn
- Preceded by: Jon Trickett
- Succeeded by: Angela Rayner

Shadow Minister without Portfolio
- In office 7 October 2016 – 14 June 2017
- Leader: Jeremy Corbyn
- Preceded by: Jonathan Ashworth
- Succeeded by: Ian Lavery

Member of Parliament for Gorton and Denton Denton and Reddish (2005–2024)
- In office 5 May 2005 – 23 January 2026
- Preceded by: Andrew Bennett
- Succeeded by: Hannah Spencer

Personal details
- Born: Andrew John Gwynne; 4 June 1974 (age 52) Manchester, England
- Party: Labour Co-op (suspended)
- Spouse: Allison Dennis (m. 2003)
- Children: 3
- Parent: John Gwynne (father)
- Education: Wrexham Glyndŵr University; University of Salford (BA)
- Website: Official website
- Other offices: 2023-2024: Shadow Minister for Social Care; 2021-2023, 2015-2016: Shadow Minister for Public Health; 2011–2015: Shadow Minister for Health; 2010–2011: Shadow Minister for Transport; 1996–2008: Member of Tameside Council

Andrew John Gwynne (born 4 June 1974) is a British politician who was the member of Parliament (MP) for Gorton and Denton, having previously represented Denton and Reddish, from 2005 to 2026. A member of the Labour Party, he served as parliamentary under-secretary of state for public health and prevention from 2024 to 2025.

Gwynne was dismissed from his ministerial role and had his Labour membership suspended in February 2025 because of offensive messages he had written in a WhatsApp group chat with other Labour MPs. He stood down as an MP in January 2026 on health grounds.

== Early life and education ==
Gwynne was born on 4 June 1974 at Saint Mary's Hospital, Manchester. He is the son of sports commentator and reporter John Gwynne. He was educated at Egerton Park Community High School in Denton, Tameside College of Technology in Ashton-under-Lyne, North East Wales Institute of Higher Education in Wrexham from 1992 to 1995 and the University of Salford from 1995 to 1998, where he earned a BA in Politics and Contemporary History.

== Early political career ==
Gwynne became a member of the Labour Party in 1992. He was elected to represent Denton West on Tameside Council at the 1996 local elections, becoming the youngest councillor in England, aged 21. He was re-elected to the council in 2000 and 2004. Gwynne worked for the Member of Parliament for Denton and Reddish, Andrew Bennett, from 2001 to 2005.

== Parliamentary career ==
=== First term (2005–2010) ===
At the 2005 general election, Gwynne was elected as Labour MP for Denton and Reddish with 57.4% of the vote and a majority of 13,498. He was appointed to the House of Commons Procedure Committee in June 2005 and, on 10 November 2005, was promoted to become a Parliamentary private secretary (PPS) to Patricia Scotland, the Minister of State for Criminal Justice and Offender Management at the Home Office. From July 2007 to June 2009, he served as the Parliamentary private secretary to the Home Secretary, Jacqui Smith. In June 2009, he became Parliamentary Private Secretary to the Secretary of State for Children, Schools and Families, then Ed Balls.

=== Second term (2010–2015) ===
At the 2010 general election, Gwynne was re-elected as MP for Denton and Reddish with a decreased vote share of 51% and a decreased majority of 9,831. In October 2010, Gwynne became a shadow transport minister with responsibility for passenger transport. In the Opposition frontbench reshuffle of October 2011, he was appointed to the shadow health team by Ed Miliband.

=== Third term (2015–2017) ===
At the 2015 general election, Gwynne was again re-elected, with a decreased vote share of 50.8% and an increased majority of 10,511. Gwynne took a leading role in November 2015 in organising Labour in the Oldham West and Royton by-election, which took place as a result of the death of Michael Meacher. Gwynne said he hoped that "I can do the memory of Michael Meacher proud by helping to return a Labour MP for the seat". The Labour candidate Jim McMahon held the seat with a 10,000-plus majority and increased the party's share of the vote.

In January 2017, Gwynne was appointed to lead Labour's campaign for the Copeland by-election following the resignation of Jamie Reed. Gwynne focused the campaign on Conservative plans to cut services at West Cumberland Hospital and move facilities—including maternity services—to Carlisle, 40 miles away. In February 2017, Gwynne was appointed as the Labour Party's Co-National Campaign Coordinator. He shared this post with Ian Lavery. During the 2017 UK general election campaign, Gwynne clashed with Foreign Secretary Boris Johnson on Sky News, calling Johnson a "pillock" in a debate over Brexit policy.

=== Fourth term (2017–2019) ===
At the snap election in June 2017, Gwynne was again re-elected, with an increased vote share of 63.5% and an increased majority of 14,077. Following the election, Gwynne retained his role as the Labour Party's Co-National Campaign Coordinator, and was promoted to Shadow Communities and Local Government Secretary, replacing Grahame Morris. In April 2018, Gwynne was identified as a member of a Facebook group where individuals had shared antisemitic material. When a reporter confronted him about the group, Gwynne stated that he had been added to it without his permission.

=== Fifth term (2019–2024) ===
At the 2019 general election, Gwynne was again re-elected, with a decreased vote share of 50.1% and a decreased majority of 6,175. In April 2020, one day after Keir Starmer was elected as Labour leader, Gwynne resigned from his position as Shadow Communities and Local Government Secretary. In the November 2021 British shadow cabinet reshuffle, he returned to his former role as Shadow Minister for Public Health. In the 2023 British shadow cabinet reshuffle, he was appointed Shadow Minister for Social Care.

=== Sixth term (2024–2026) ===
Due to the 2023 review of Westminster constituencies, Gwynne's constituency of Denton and Reddish was abolished, and replaced by Gorton and Denton. At the 2024 general election, Gwynne was elected as MP for Gorton and Denton with 50.8% of the vote and a majority of 13,413. After the election, Gwynne was appointed Parliamentary Under-Secretary of State for Public Health and Prevention in the Department of Health and Social Care.

==== Ministerial dismissal and suspension ====
On 8 February 2025, Gwynne was dismissed from his post as health minister and suspended from the Labour Party for offensive comments he had made in a WhatsApp group used by Labour politicians in Greater Manchester. In one message, Gwynne suggested the following reply to a constituent who had complained about a bin collection: "Dear resident, Fuck your bins. I'm re-elected and without your vote. Screw you. PS: Hopefully you'll have croaked it by the all-outs". Gwynne wrote in the group that Diane Abbott's appearance as the first Black woman at Prime Minister's Questions was a "joke" for Black History Month, and shared a post making sexualised comments about fellow Labour MP Angela Rayner. Gwynne wrote that American psychologist Marshall Rosenberg's name "sounds too militaristic and too Jewish", and asked if Rosenberg was a member of Israel's intelligence service, Mossad.

In response, Gwynne wrote: "I deeply regret my badly misjudged comments and apologise for any offence I've caused." He added: "I entirely understand the decisions the PM and the party have taken and, while very sad to have been suspended, I will support them in any way I can." The Parliamentary Commissioner for Standards opened an inquiry on 18 February into whether Gwynne's actions had caused "significant damage to the reputation of the house as a whole, or of its members generally". A second Labour MP, Oliver Ryan, was also involved in the scandal and investigated.

==== Resignation ====
According to The Guardian, it was believed that Gwynne applied for medical retirement from the MPs' pension fund in 2025, but did not pursue the claim. It was suggested that this was related to an agreement made with Andy Burnham that he would stand down to make way for Burnham in Gorton and Denton, although Burnham's allies have denied this, as has Gwynne. Gwynne ultimately announced his resignation on the grounds of ill health on 22 January 2026. The next day, he was made Crown Steward of the Manor of Northstead by the Chancellor of the Exchequer, a traditional mechanism by which MPs resign. In his resignation statement, he published medical advice from his GP that led to his resignation. A by-election was held to fill the seat on 26 February 2026 which was won by Hannah Spencer of the Green Party of England and Wales.

== President of Friends of Real Lancashire ==
In 2023, he became the President of Friends of Real Lancashire, an organisation dedicated to promoting and preserving the heritage and identity of the historic county of Lancashire, following the death of its founder.

== Personal life ==
Gwynne married Allison Dennis, who serves as a Tameside councillor for Denton North East, on 28 March 2003 at St Anne's Church in Denton. The couple have three children: sons James (born 1997) and William (born 2000), and a daughter, Maisie (born 2001). Gwynne and his wife are kinship carers for their grandson, Lyle (born 2019), who contracted respiratory syncytial virus (RSV) as an infant and spent two weeks in a neonatal intensive care unit.

Parliament of the United Kingdom
Preceded by Andrew Bennett	Member of Parliament for Denton and Reddish; 2005–2024	Constituency abolished
New constituency	Member of Parliament for Gorton and Denton; 2024–2026	Succeeded by Hannah Spencer
Political offices
Preceded by Jon Ashworth	Shadow Minister without Portfolio; 2016–2017	Succeeded by Ian Lavery
Preceded by Roberta Blackman-Woods	Shadow Secretary of State for Housing, Communities and Local Government; 2017–2020	Succeeded by Steve Reed
Preceded by Andrea Leadsom	Parliamentary Under-Secretary of State for Public Health and Prevention; 2024–2025	Succeeded by Ashley Dalton
