= Denton Town Hall =

Municipal building in Denton, Greater Manchester, England

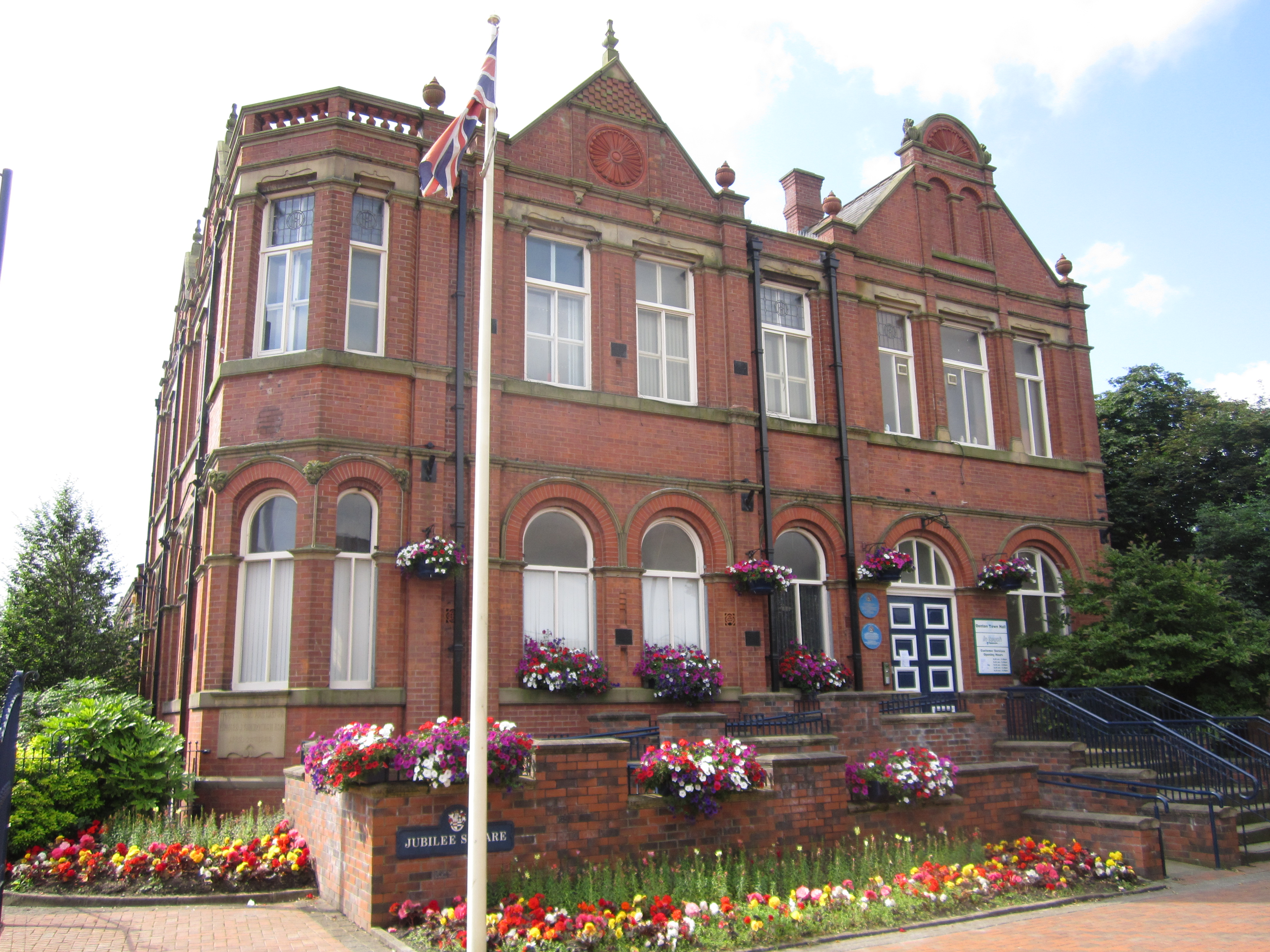
- Denton Town Hall

- Shown in Greater Manchester
- 53.4550°N 2.1145°W
- Location: Market Street, Denton

History
- Built: 1889

Site notes
- Architect(s): T. D. and J. Lindley
- Architectural style: Italianate style

Denton Town Hall is a municipal building in the Market Street, Denton, Greater Manchester, England. The town hall is the meeting place of Denton Town Council and is also used as a public library.

== History ==
The building was originally commissioned as a public library and as lasting monument to celebrate for the Golden Jubilee of Queen Victoria: the site chosen by civic leaders for the new building was open land to the west of Stockport Road.

The foundation stone for the library was laid by Edward Joseph Sidebottom, a local landowner and photographer, on 28 April 1888. Designed by T. D. and J. Lindley in the Italianate style, it was built in red brick with elements of stone facing and officially opened by Alderman Walton Smith, chairman of the Manchester Free Libraries Committee, on 7 September 1889. The building was located on a corner site, with its principal facades on Market Street and Albert Street; the design involved a canted section at the junction of these two roads with a round headed window on the ground floor, a sash window on the first floor and a parapet above; there four bays along Market Street and five bays along Albert Street; the Albert Street elevation featured a round headed doorway with a fanlight in the second bay from the right; both elevations had round headed sash windows on the first floor and gables above.

After the free library had moved to Peel Street and Denton Urban District Council had been formed in 1894, the building was converted for municipal purposes by Joseph Clayton and was re-opened by the chairman of the council, Councillor Thomas Woolfenden, as Denton Town Hall on 6 March 1899. Internally, the principal room in the new building was the council chamber. The building became a centre of trade union activity in the hatting industry in the 1920s and Thomas Mallalieu, who had served as President of the General Federation of Trade Unions from 1918 to 1922 went on to chair Denton Urban District Council in 1924/25.

The building continued to serve as the headquarters of Denton Urban District Council but ceased to be local seat of government when the enlarged Tameside Metropolitan Borough Council was formed in 1974. A blue plaque was placed on the side of the town hall to commemorate Denton becoming a twin-town to Montigny le Bretonneux, near Paris, France on 18 September 1993. A statue designed by John Cox and Escar UK Bronze, depicting a man doffing his Linney Hat, in tribute to the Denton hatting industry, was unveiled by Councillor Martin Wareing outside the town hall on 12 October 2005. The building was converted for library use again and re-opened as such in January 2015. It also became the home of the new Denton Town Council, which was formed from the old Denton District Assembly, in late 2016.
