= St Anne's Rectory =

Listed building in Denton, Greater Manchester, England

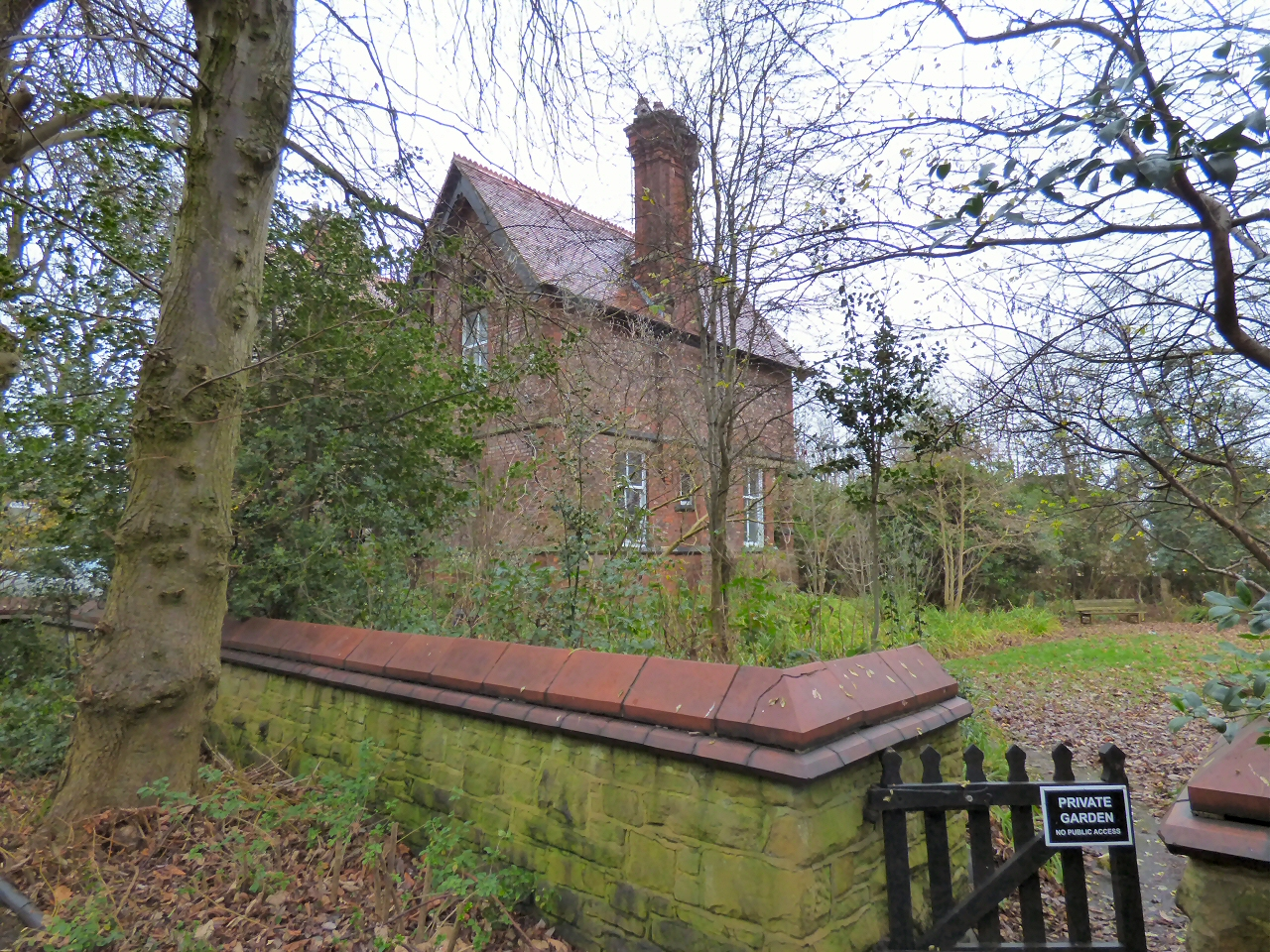
- St Anne's Rectory in 2018

- Location within Greater Manchester

General information
- Location: St Anne's Drive, Denton, Greater Manchester, England
- Coordinates: 53.50014°N 2.11168°W
- Year built: 1882; 144 years ago

Design and construction
- Architects: J. M. and H. Taylor

Listed Building – Grade II*
- Official name: St Annes Rectory
- Designated: 20 July 1977
- Reference no.: 1067970

St Anne's Rectory is a Grade II* listed building on St Anne's Drive in Denton, a town within Tameside, Greater Manchester, England. The rectory is associated with St Anne's Church and is recognised for its architectural and historic significance. It is currently a private residence.

== History ==
St Anne's Rectory was constructed in 1882 as the residence for clergy serving St Anne's Church. Both buildings were funded by Edward Joseph Sidebotham, a local landowner, employer, and benefactor. Sidebotham, an industrial chemist with interests in the arts and sciences, commissioned architects J. Medland Taylor and Henry Taylor to design the church and rectory. The church's dedication to St Anne reflected the shared name of Sidebotham's wife, and mother.

The rectory was originally listed at Grade II on 20 July 1977 for its architectural and historic significance. The designation was later upgraded to Grade II* in May 2003.

In August 2021, Tameside Council granted listed building consent for internal works, including installing new doors, altering room layouts, replacing built-in bookcases, dado rails, and window reveals on a like-for-like basis, repairing walls and ceilings, adding a new window seat, and updating electrical fittings and lighting. External works included the installation of a new boundary gate and removal of a non-original timber floor.

In December 2021, a man was charged with carrying out unauthorised alterations to the rectory. The works involved removing original features such as a cast-iron fire grate, built-in bookcases, dado rails, mouldings, and window reveals, as well as a window seat from an upstairs bedroom. Additional changes included installing a timber partition, creating a doorway between bedrooms, and damaging historic plasterwork to accommodate electrical fittings.

These alterations were alleged to have compromised the building's special architectural and historic character, in breach of the Planning (Listed Buildings and Conservation Areas) Act 1990. The case was scheduled for a hearing at Tameside Magistrates' Court on 16 December 2021. As of 2025, no outcome has been made public.

== Architecture ==
St Anne's Rectory is constructed of brick with a clay tile roof and has an irregular two and three-storey plan in a free Gothic style. The building comprises gabled cross-wings flanking a central section, which incorporates a half-octagonal stair tower in the left angle. Horizontal bands at ground and first floor level articulate the elevations. Between the cross-wings, an open porch with a hipped roof occupies the right angle.

External features include a six-light mullioned and transomed stair window on the first floor, and a gabled oriel window on the left cross-wing rising from a weathered buttress, flanked by two segmental-headed recesses. The right cross-wing contains a sash window with a carved tympanum panel beneath a relieving arch. Windows are generally four-pane sashes, and the roof is finished with banded fish-scale tiles. The skyline includes elaborate brick chimney stacks and the conical roof of the stair tower, which is similar in form to that of the adjacent church.

=== Interior ===
Internally, the building retains much of its original detailing. The principal rooms contain pitch pine panelling, doors, dado rails, and fitted furniture. The octagonal dining room includes a cast-iron corner fireplace with Delft tiles and a panelled overmantel incorporating a stained glass window. A comparable fireplace and overmantel remain in the study, which also contains fitted furniture and a small stone window with stained and patterned glass. An inglenook fireplace that was previously located in the main reception room has been removed. The pitch pine staircase leads to a landing with an arcade supported on a circular pier, from which a spiral stair provides access to the top storey. The staircase window contains stained and painted glass dated 1882, and other windows incorporate stained and patterned glass panels.

== Wall and lychgate ==
The Grade II-listed boundary wall and lychgate associated with the church and rectory date from around 1882 and form part of Taylor's design for the St Anne's complex. The wall is constructed of banded stone and brick and is finished with a terracotta coping. The lychgate has an oak frame with a clay-tiled roof and is executed in a 15th-century style.

== See also ==
- Grade II* listed buildings in Greater Manchester
- Listed buildings in Denton, Greater Manchester
