= Bolton College =

Further education college in Bolton, England

- Former names: Bolton Community College
- Type: further education
- Principal: Liam Sloan
- Location: Bolton, Greater Manchester, England; 53°34′25.68″N 2°25′22.44″W
- Website: http://www.boltoncollege.ac.uk

Bolton College (previously known as Bolton Community College) is a further education college located in Bolton, Greater Manchester, England.

The college is primarily based in Bolton, but operates a number of Community Learning Centres in the surrounding area. The college provides a range of courses that include vocational education, work-based learning, ESOL courses, Diplomas, apprenticeships, Access courses and Higher Education courses.

The college's most recent OFSTED report (March 2017) gave the college an overall grade of 'Good'.

== Notable alumni ==
- Amir Khan, Boxer
- Peter Kay, Comedian
- Hannah Spencer, MP for Gorton & Denton

== See also ==
- List of UCAS institutions
- List of universities in the United Kingdom
