= 2026 Gorton and Denton by-election =

UK parliamentary by-election

- 26 February 2026

Gorton and Denton constituency
- Turnout: 47.6% (▼0.4 pp)
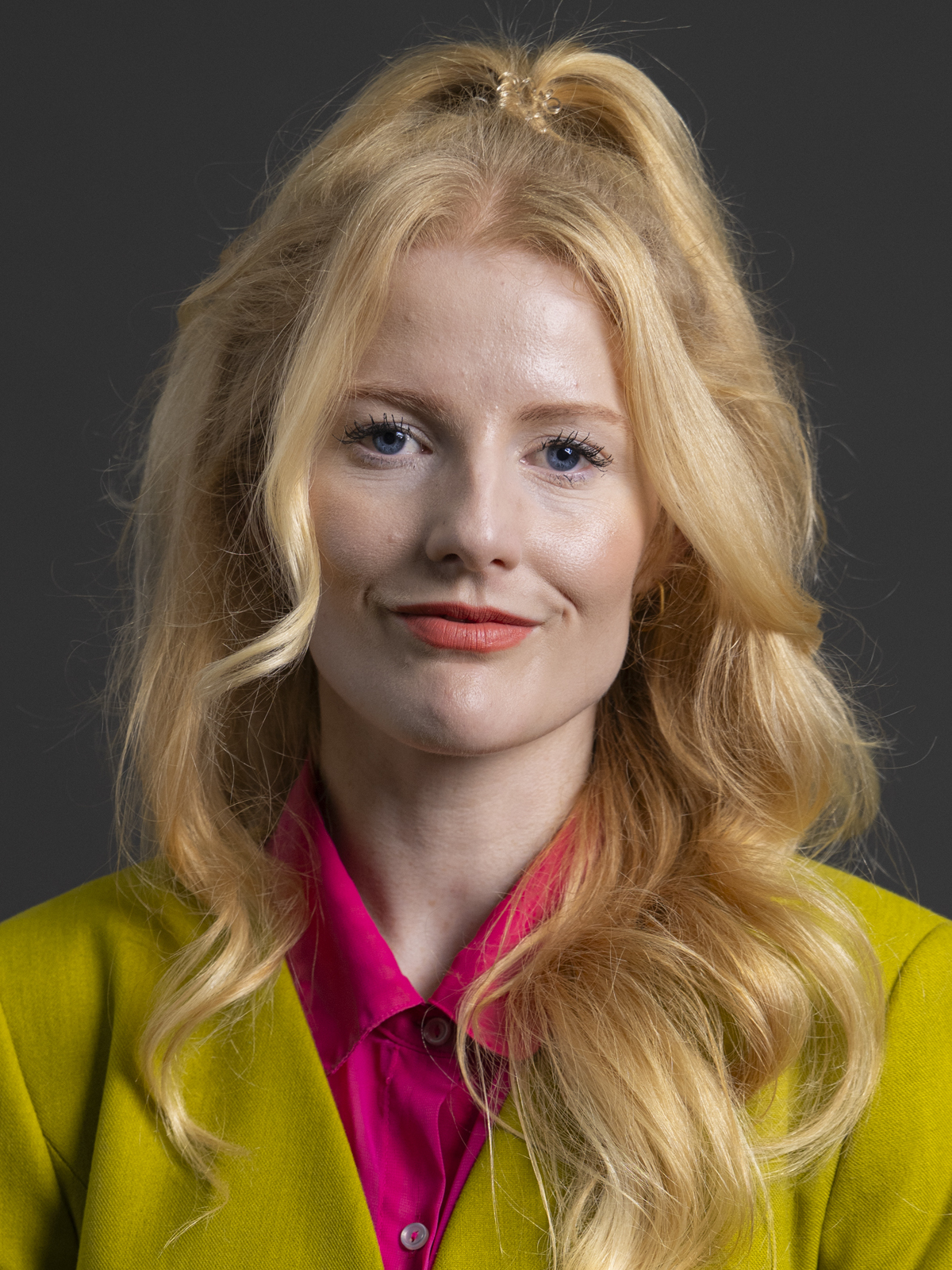

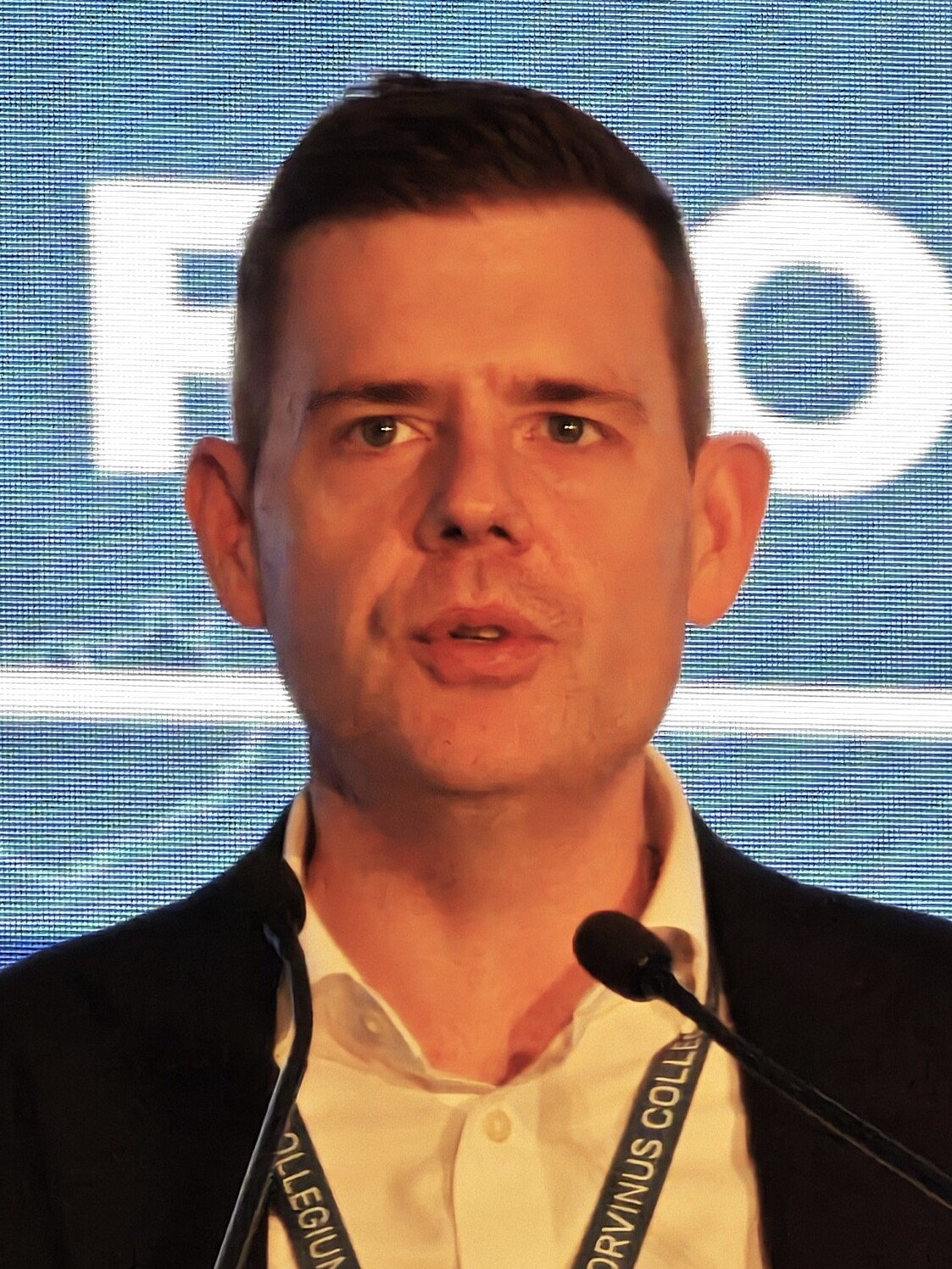

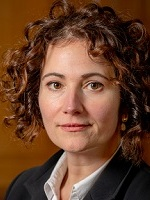
Candidate	Hannah Spencer	Matt Goodwin	Angeliki Stogia
Party	Green	Reform	Labour
Popular vote	14,980	10,578	9,364
Percentage	40.7%	28.7%	25.4%
Swing	▲27.5 pp	▲14.6 pp	▼25.4 pp
- Boundary of Gorton and Denton in North West England
MP before election
Andrew Gwynne
Independent (Note: Although elected for Labour Co-op in 2024, Gwynne was sitting as an independent MP at the time of his resignation.)
Elected MP
Hannah Spencer
Green

A by-election for the United Kingdom parliamentary constituency of Gorton and Denton was held on 26 February 2026, following the resignation of Andrew Gwynne on health grounds. Gwynne was sitting as an independent following suspension from the Labour Party for sending offensive WhatsApp messages.

Hannah Spencer of the Green Party won the by-election with 40.7% of the vote and a margin of victory of 4,402 votes, becoming the party's fifth MP and first in the North of England. It was the Green Party's first by-election victory and its highest vote share in a by-election, by a margin of 30 percentage points.

Andy Burnham, the mayor of Greater Manchester, applied to be the Labour candidate, but was blocked by the party's National Executive Committee (NEC), a decision Angela Rayner later called a mistake. Commentators described his bid as a possible springboard for a leadership challenge to Prime Minister Keir Starmer; Burnham later won the 2026 Makerfield by-election, amid the 2026 leadership crisis.

The result was widely considered a significant blow for the Labour Party, being its first election loss in Gorton since the 1931 UK general election and the seventh-largest Labour majority to be overturned at a by-election. Commentators described the result as seismic and historic, showing the rise of newer parties in British politics, and undermining Labour's political strategy.

== Background ==
Gorton and Denton is a predominantly urban constituency in Greater Manchester, comprising electoral wards of both the City of Manchester and the Metropolitan Borough of Tameside. Containing districts such as Burnage, Denton, Gorton, Levenshulme, and Longsight, the area is diverse, with left-leaning young professionals in Levenshulme, white working-class Reform UK–leaning voters in Denton, and a Muslim population (who make up about 28% of the seat) around Gorton. The constituency is the 15th most deprived of England's 543 constituencies; 35 of the 40 neighbourhoods in the Manchester part of the constituency are in the 20% most deprived in the country, and 45% of the children in the constituency live below the poverty line. The constituency also includes Manchester's poorest neighbourhood, Longsight East, where average household disposable income is £23,000 a year, less than half that of the highest-income neighbourhood in the city.

Andrew Gwynne was first elected as the Labour Co-op MP for the constituency of Denton and Reddish in the 2005 UK general election, and was re-elected to the seat for the four subsequent parliaments. Denton and Reddish was abolished in the 2023 review of Westminster constituencies. In the 2024 UK general election, Gwynne won the new constituency of Gorton and Denton with 50.8% of the vote and a majority of 13,413. Gwynne served in the Starmer ministry as a health minister until February 2025, when he was dismissed from his ministerial role and suspended from the Labour Party as a result of antisemitic comments and comments about an elderly constituent he made in a private WhatsApp group.

Following his suspension, Gwynne sat in the House of Commons as an independent MP. Speculation began in mid-2025 that Gwynne would resign on health grounds so that Andy Burnham, the mayor of Greater Manchester, could stand in his seat. In September 2025, Gwynne denied that he would stand down and rejected the idea. There was also speculation that Burnham's allies were drawing up a list of possible constituencies where he could stand in a by-election, including Gwynne's; at the time, Gwynne said he had no intention of standing down before the May 2026 local elections. On 22 January 2026, Gwynne announced his resignation, citing "significant ill health" and advice from his doctor that it was unsafe for him to return to work. The following day, he was appointed Crown Steward and Bailiff of the Manor of Northstead. (Note: One of two offices to which MPs can be appointed that effectively trigger their resignation from the House of Commons, as resignation in its own right is not permitted by law. For his appointment, see "Chancellor of the Exchequer". The London Gazette. 23 January 2026.) The by-election, the second since the 2024 general election after the 2025 Runcorn and Helsby by-election, was formally called by Manchester City Council on 28 January.

Prior to the election, it was described as "very critical" by Labour Health Secretary Wes Streeting in the context of Burnham's potential candidacy. A Sunday Times journalist also called it critical and noted the presence of Chancellor Rachel Reeves in Gorton instead of a scheduled trip to China. Days prior to the election, pollster Mark Diffley described it as "one of the most important elections of recent times", while political scientist Robert Ford said it could be "the day Labour's electoral Tinkerbell dies" in reference to the shift in support away from Labour to the Green Party and Reform UK.

== Candidates ==
The final list of 11 candidates was published on 3 February 2026. Pollsters and political commentators characterised the by-election as a three-way race between the Greens, Labour and Reform UK.

=== Labour Party ===
==== Blocking of Andy Burnham's candidacy ====
Following media and public speculation, Andy Burnham, the incumbent mayor of Greater Manchester and former MP for Leigh, requested approval to stand as Labour's candidate on 24 January. As a sitting directly elected mayor, the party's rules required him to seek the approval of the party's National Executive Committee (NEC) before putting himself forward for selection as a parliamentary candidate. The NEC met on 25 January and voted 8–1 against Burnham's candidacy, with most NEC officers – including Prime Minister Keir Starmer – voting against, NEC Chair and Home Secretary Shabana Mahmood abstaining, and party Deputy Leader Lucy Powell voting for allowing Burnham to stand.

Burnham expressed his disappointment and concern about the impact of the ruling for Labour in the 2026 local elections, the 2026 Scottish Parliament election, and 2026 Senedd election. The decision was criticised by Labour members, with 53% of party members disagreeing with the NEC's move, and 50 Labour MPs and half a dozen Labour peers signed a letter objecting to the NEC's decision. Unison head Andrea Egan expressed frustration at the decision, saying that members of the union would be "disappointed and angry". Former Deputy Prime Minister Angela Rayner had previously declared the idea of the NEC preventing Burnham standing as a "stitch up", before the ruling was announced.

The by-election had been framed by the media as a route for Burnham to return to Westminster and potentially challenge Starmer for the Labour leadership. Labour figures were reported to be concerned that Burnham's candidacy would trigger a by-election for the position of mayor, which would be expensive and politically risky for the party. Burnham's application to stand in the by-election was supported by some senior Labour figures, including Powell, Rayner, Mayor of London Sadiq Khan, and Energy Secretary Ed Miliband, and organisations Mainstream and Momentum.

==== Candidate selection ====
Angeliki Stogia, a councillor for the nearby Whalley Range ward, an employee of the Arup Group, and a professional lobbyist, was announced as the Labour Party candidate on 31 January, beating Eamonn O'Brien, the leader of Bury Council. Fellow Manchester City Council members Rabnawaz Akbar, Abid Latif Chohan, and Julie Reid were also on the longlist. Stogia is originally from Arta, in Greece. As a councillor, her local credentials were noted by Labour insiders speaking to The Guardian as a contributing factor to her victory in a close race. Stogia previously stood as a Labour candidate for North West England in the 2014 European Parliament election and Chester South and Eddisbury in the 2024 general election.

=== Reform UK ===
Matt Goodwin was announced as the Reform UK candidate on 27 January. He is a conservative political commentator, right-wing activist, GB News presenter, and former professor at the University of Kent. He is also honorary president of the party's student wing, Students4Reform. Goodwin stated that, as a student at the University of Salford, he used to deliver pizzas in the constituency area. He lives in Hitchin, Hertfordshire. Zia Yusuf had previously been mentioned as a potential candidate.

=== Green Party ===
On 30 January, the Green Party announced that its candidate was Hannah Spencer, a councillor on Trafford Council for Hale in Greater Manchester, who had been the Green candidate in the 2024 Greater Manchester mayoral election. Spencer, a plumber, is a life-long resident of Greater Manchester and said that she previously lived in the constituency. She was selected by the local party at an online hustings event the night before: with 457 votes, she beat Muslim Greens co-chair Fesl Reza-Khan (65 votes) and local campaigner Sarah Wakefield (63 votes).

=== Other political parties ===
The Conservative Party announced on 1 February that its candidate would be Charlotte Cadden, a former detective chief inspector who was a police officer for 30 years and had served with both Greater Manchester Police and the Metropolitan Police. She is a trustee of the anti-trans rights group Sex Matters. The Liberal Democrats announced on 30 January that their candidate would be Jackie Pearcey, a local resident, school governor, and president of the North West Liberal Democrats, who had previously stood in 1997, 2001, 2017, and 2019 in Manchester Gorton, which covered the western part of the current constituency.

On 1 February 2026, Advance UK announced its candidate as charity worker Nick Buckley, a former member of Reform UK who stood for the party in the 2021 Greater Manchester mayoral election, coming fifth, and then in the 2024 Greater Manchester mayoral election as an independent candidate, where he came third. The magazine Searchlight criticised Buckley for having invited Nick Griffin, the former leader of the far-right British National Party, onto his podcast, Nick Talks, a week before his selection as Advance UK's candidate.

The Social Democratic Party announced on 29 January that its candidate would be Sebastian Moore, the party's North West Chair, who previously stood as the party's candidate in Manchester Central in 2024. Rejoin EU announced on 31 January that its candidate would be Joseph O'Meachair, a member of the party's executive committee who stood for the party in Preston in the 2024 general election. The candidate for the Communist League was Hugo Wils, an aerospace factory worker and member of Unite the Union. The candidate for the satirical Official Monster Raving Loony Party was Sir Oink A-Lot, who previously stood for the party in the 2015 Oldham West and Royton by-election and the 2023 Manchester City Council election in Northenden, with the party stating it was "hamming it up and bringing home the bacon" with its "local candidate", who was "the whole hog" and had "Think Big, Vote Pig" as the campaign slogan. The candidate for the Libertarian Party was Dan Clarke, who stood for the Liberal Party in Runcorn and Helsby in the 2024 general election and in the 2025 Runcorn and Helsby by-election.

=== Parties who did not contest ===
Initially, the Workers Party of Britain's leader George Galloway, who lost his seat of Rochdale at the last general election, said he would stand if Burnham became the Labour candidate. On 27 January, it was reported that the party selected Manchester City Councillor Shahbaz Sarwar as its candidate, but on 28 January the party said that it had not yet chosen its candidate and would choose from a list of four contenders, including Galloway and Sarwar. On 1 February, the party announced that it had decided not to stand in the Gorton by-election, describing it as "in the best interests of the working-class" for Labour and Reform to lose.

Your Party chose not to field a candidate as the by-election date coincided with the election of the party's Central Executive Committee, which will make decisions on election candidates. In a statement released on 2 February, the party said that standing would not "serve [its] collective goals", instead urging supporters to "actively mobilise" against Reform in the constituency. PoliticsHome reported that Your Party had previously discussed endorsing the Greens, and three co-founders of the party (Jeremy Corbyn, Zarah Sultana, and Salma Yaqoob) later individually endorsed the Greens.

== Campaign and related events ==
=== Labour Party ===
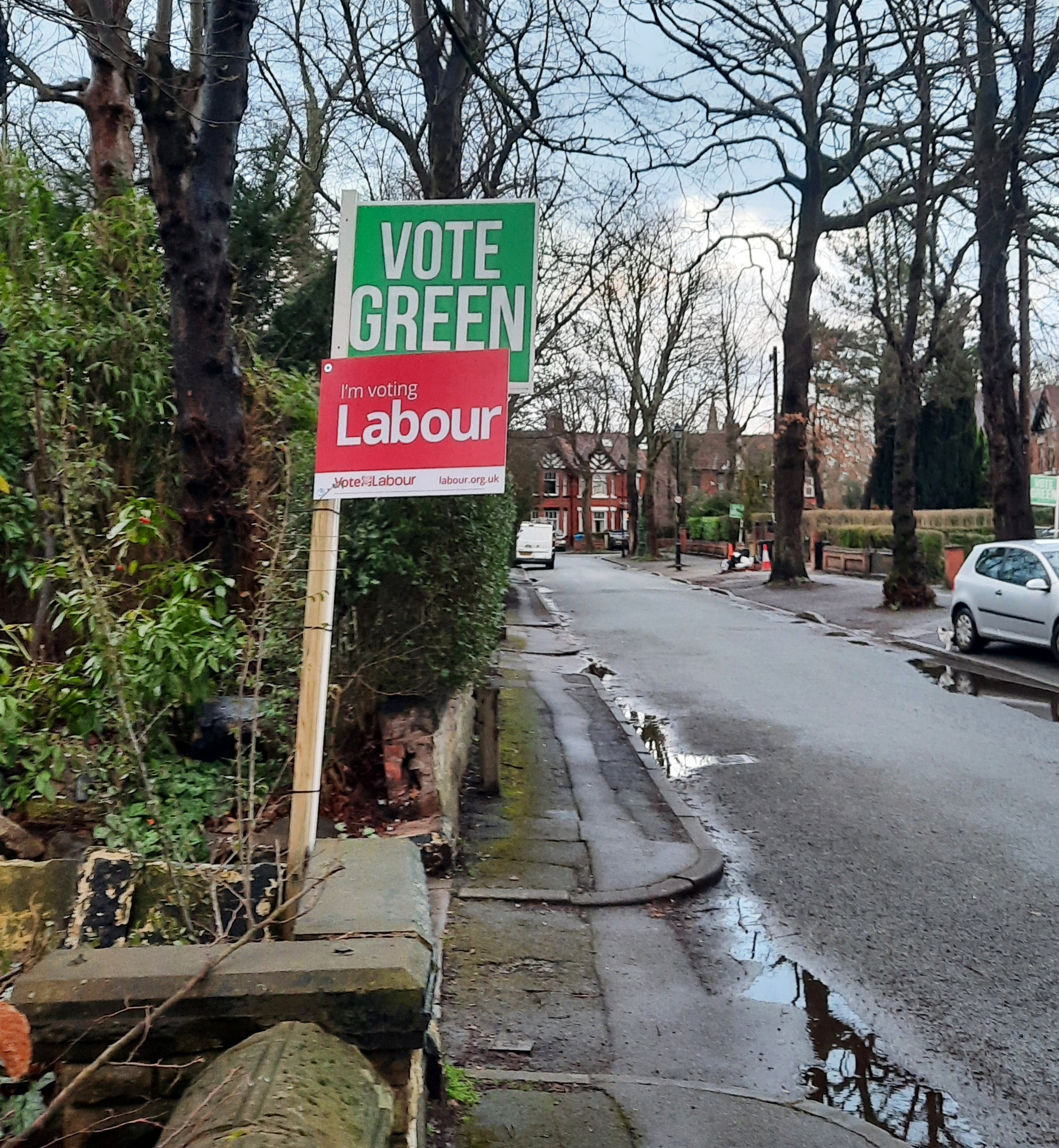
Campaign boards in Levenshulme

Angeliki Stogia said that, if elected, she would campaign for government investment in local areas and to improve local GP provision. She also said she was campaigning against fly tipping and for having breakfast clubs in every school, as well as opportunities for young people and reliable public transport, stating that Labour's campaign was "grounded in the everyday concerns" of the constituency's population. On 27 January, The Guardian wrote that Labour's campaign had been set back after six local Labour councillors were found by an internal party investigation to have shown "complete disregard" for standards in public life. These findings were due to be considered by the council less than four weeks before the by-election.

Labour's early campaign was overshadowed by a scandal involving the relationship between party grandee and former ambassador to the United States Peter Mandelson and the late US child sex offender Jeffrey Epstein, which re-emerged following the January 2026 release of the Epstein files by the US government. This led to the resignation of Starmer's chief of staff Morgan McSweeney and the Scottish Labour Leader Anas Sarwar publicly calling for Starmer's resignation, although Starmer remained defiant, stating he had "won every fight I've ever been in", and did not resign.

According to The Independent, some Labour backbenchers were despondent and disinclined to campaign for Stogia, expecting a large defeat in the historically safe seat amid concerns over Starmer's leadership, and following Burnham being blocked from standing. On 5 February, The Critic reported that Labour had begun briefing journalists that it was expecting an "inevitable defeat". The Week reported on 7 February that a number of Labour MPs were "secretly" hoping for a loss in the by-election, with the aim of forcing Starmer's resignation and electing a "better leader" as a result.

Starmer described the by-election as a "straight fight" between Labour and Reform, which was repeatedly denied by the Green Party. Labour began focusing campaign material against the Green Party, which similarly positioned itself as the main contender to Reform at the start of the campaign; according to The Standard, Labour figures warned that it would be "existential" for the party if it was beaten by the Greens. Insiders also feared a "Caerphilly scenario", in which Labour voters tactically vote for the Greens to stop a Reform win, as was largely seen to be the case in Labour's loss to Plaid Cymru in the 2025 Caerphilly by-election to the Senedd, where it finished in third place behind Reform. Similarly, Starmer stated that the party should also heed warnings from the 2025 Runcorn and Helsby by-election, blaming the exceedingly narrow Reform win on a split vote between the Greens and Labour, and said that "a vote for the Greens is, in effect, a vote for Reform".

Labour criticised the Greens' party policy of drug decriminalisation, while the Green Party accused Labour of pursuing a "failed war on drugs". Stogia accused the Greens of lying to the public by suggesting that only they could beat Reform UK, and Labour Party chairwoman Anna Turley said that the Greens were only concerned with undermining Labour rather than winning the seat. In response, Green Party leader Zack Polanski declared Labour was "a distant third", referring to polling suggesting Labour Party was behind the Greens, and urged Labour Deputy Leader Lucy Powell to back the Greens to prevent a Reform victory. On 3 February, in the wake of both Your Party and the Workers Party of Britain confirming that they would not field candidates, Labour accused the Greens of a "grubby deal" in which they asked the two parties not to stand, with the aim of maximising the Green vote against Labour. The Green Party rejected any claims of deals, and said the other parties concluded that "the only way to beat Reform is to vote Green". Late in the campaign, Starmer made the unusual move for a sitting Prime Minister of campaigning in the by-election, thereby raising the stakes.

Greater Manchester Police launched an investigation into a Labour campaign event in which attendees were told to hold up Labour posters "if you want to get fed". The Greens and Reform accused Labour of violating electoral law by bribing voters with food, while Labour described the event as "ordinary hospitality". The day before the election, leaflets were distributed by Labour purporting to come from a tactical voting group called "Tactical Choice" which recommended voting Labour. No organisation called "Tactical Choice" appears to exist, and the Green Party accused Labour of making up "an entirely fictitious organisation".

=== Reform UK ===
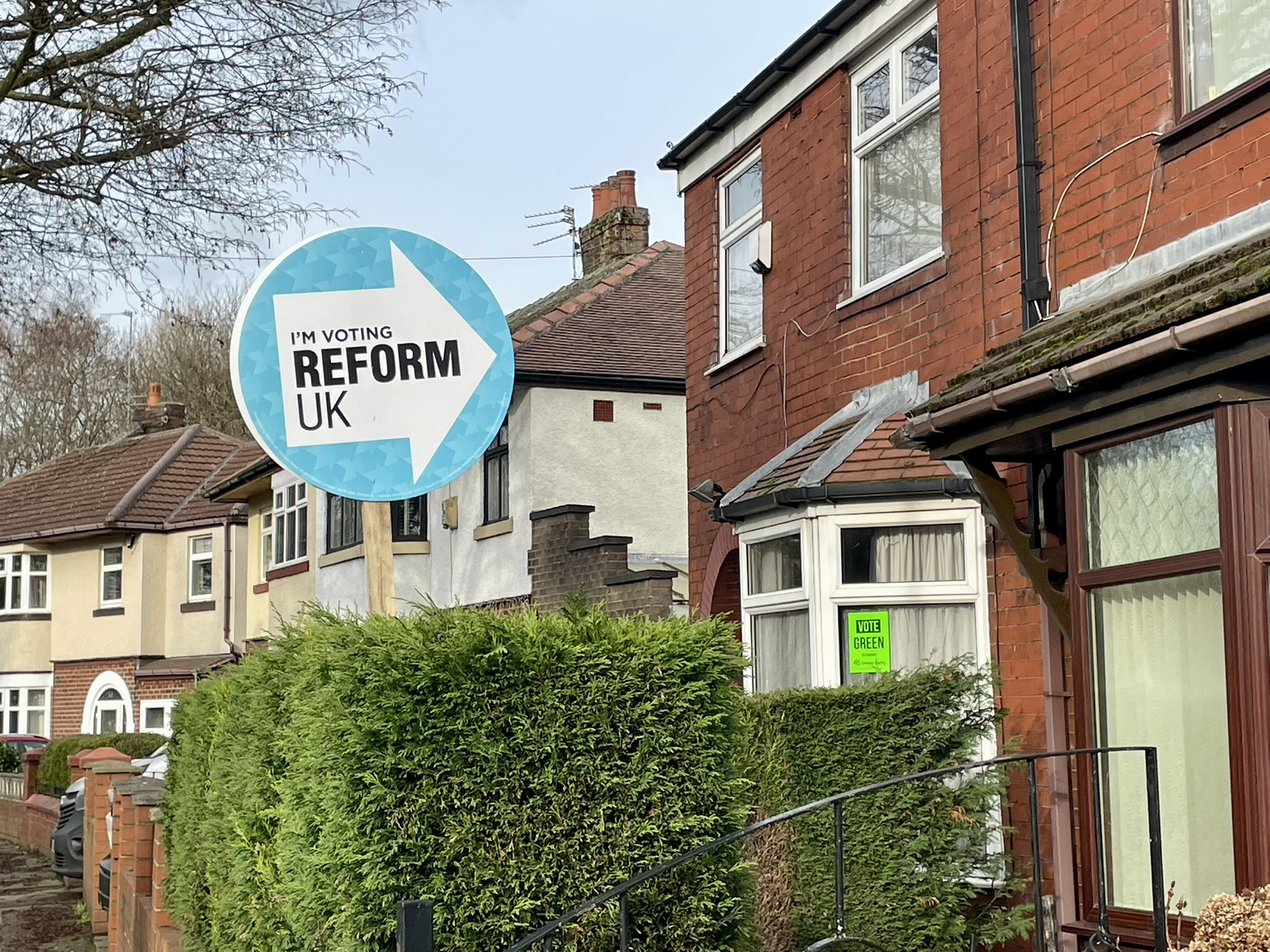
A campaign board and a window poster displayed outside houses in Denton

Reform UK's Tameside Council member for Longdendale, Allan Hopwood, said the party had been planning for a by-election for months prior. Matt Goodwin positioned the by-election as a "referendum on Keir Starmer" during the Reform launch event, and told The Times that his aim was for Starmer to resign if Reform won in the constituency. Reform chief whip Lee Anderson said that Reform were campaigning on crime and "the decline of the high street", and at a press conference, Anderson and Goodwin also highlighted the issue of child grooming gangs. Goodwin said that, if elected, he would campaign to cut energy bills and taxes, focus on addressing illegal migration, and campaign for increased police presence and usage of stop and search tactics. Reform described the by-election in campaign material as a "simple choice" between Labour and Reform; however, Goodwin later stated that support for Labour appeared "weaker" than expected and he now saw the Greens as the main opposition to Reform.

Goodwin was criticised by Labour and the Greens for a blog he posted in 2023, in which he argued that the "British family is imploding" and offered a list of ideas to create a pro-family culture in the UK, including raising taxes on those without children. Labour and the Greens also criticised him for saying in a YouTube video posted to his channel that young girls and women should be having children earlier and be given a "biological reality" check. In response, Goodwin stated that his critics cultivated "a country [that is] completely incapable of talking about the family" and said he supported a "mature, grown-up, responsible conversation" on the issue. Goodwin was criticised by Labour and the Greens for saying that UK-born people from ethnic minority backgrounds are not necessarily British following the 2025 Cambridgeshire train stabbing. Goodwin stated the media reports were misleading, and that he said that second generation immigrants committing terrorist acts such as the Manchester Arena bombing are not "as British as" their victims.

On 6 February, The Mill reported that Reform had distributed leaflets presented as a handwritten-style letter from local pensioner Patricia Clegg, who had been asked by Reform to write to support its campaign, which lacked the required legal imprint disclosing the funding origin of the material. Reform stated that the issue was outside of its control, and Hardings Print Solutions took "full responsibility" for erroneously omitting the imprint during its production process. Following advice from the Electoral Commission, Greater Manchester Police confirmed that it had received complaints and would pursue an investigation, and later said that it provided "advice and guidance" to Reform. On 9 February, Patricia Clegg's son Andrew posted on Facebook that his mother did not sign off on the letter distributed by Reform, and that Reform, not the printers, were at fault for the error. On 25 February, a High Court judge decided not to sanction Goodwin or Reform for the error, accepting Reform's defence that it was an "honest administrative mistake" and had since taken appropriate steps to rectify the issue.

On 19 February, Reform UK suspended its interim campaign manager in Tameside, Adam Mitula, following reporting by The Mill on his earlier antisemitic and misogynistic posts shared on social media. Mitula, a Polish-born entrepreneur, reportedly said on Twitter that he would "never touch a Jewish woman", stated that he believed the Holocaust was exaggerated, and shared conspiracy theories linking transgender people to paedophilia. On 24 February, Mitula released a statement confirming that his membership of Reform had been suspended and stated that he intends to pursue legal action against The Mill. On 20 February, The Guardian reported that when Goodwin was selected to be Reform UK's candidate, there had been a complaint from a junior staffer at GB News over two alleged "inappropriate comments" that she viewed as sexually harassing. Goodwin was said to have volunteered an apology to the young woman after the complaint had been raised, and his lawyer stated no formal disciplinary action had been taken. Nigel Farage was reported to "have been told by a senior member of staff at GB News about the complaint prior to Goodwin's selection" but to not have considered the complaint to be serious enough to affect Goodwin's selection. A Reform spokesman called the report a "desperate, last-minute smear by The Guardian".

=== Green Party ===
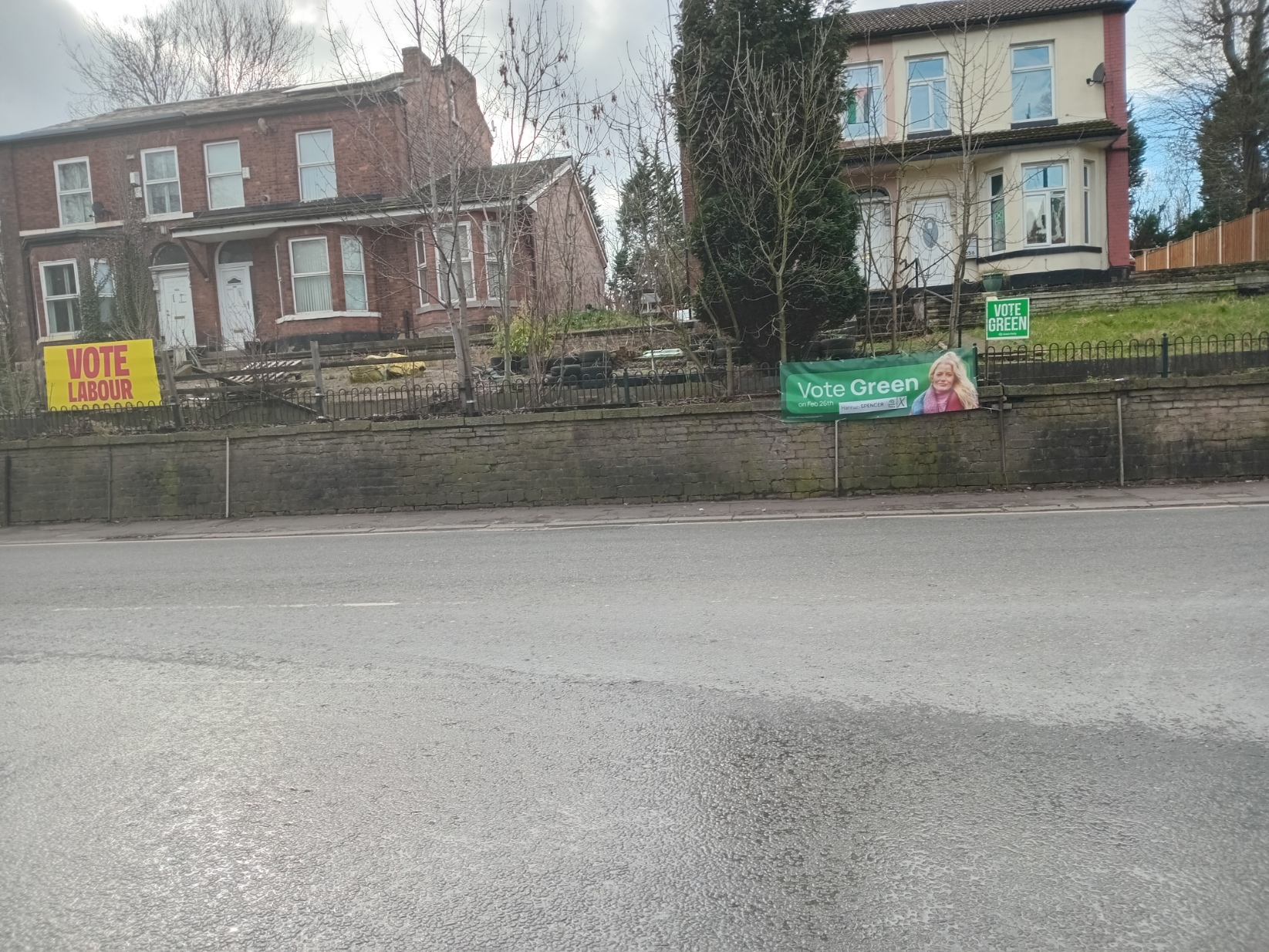
Election posters in Longsight for the Gorton and Denton by-election

Party leader Zack Polanski formally launched the Greens' campaign on 27 January, at an event in which he framed the Green campaign to the economic left of Labour and denied that the Greens would split the progressive vote, citing the government's proposed cuts to disability benefits to suggest that Labour is no longer a "left-wing party". The war in Gaza was also mentioned at the event. The Green Party described the by-election as a "Reform–Green battle", and began canvassing in the seat on 25 January. The Green candidate Hannah Spencer stated that she would seek Starmer's resignation if she won the seat. The Green campaign was managed by Miles Thorpe, who also ran Carla Denyer's successful campaign in the Labour-held Bristol Central seat in the 2024 general election.

Spencer emphasised that she was local to Manchester and argued that her work, taking her into many ordinary people's homes, helped her have a strong sense of everyday realities for voters, and of the poor insulation of many of their houses. Her campaign focused on the high cost of living, including child poverty, which she proposed to address by reducing inequality, partly via a wealth tax, and on supporting public services, including nationalising water supplies. Spencer also said that, if elected, she would campaign for a £15 minimum wage, tackling landlords through rent control, lower energy bills, and free prescriptions, dentistry and eye care. Spencer said she wanted more diverse walks of life represented in Parliament.

The Green Party aimed to attract left-leaning voters disgruntled by Labour's handling of the Gaza war, in particular from the constituency's Muslim population. Spencer described the Green Party as having a "proud history" of standing with Palestinians, and criticised Angeliki Stogia for not describing Israel's actions in the Gaza war as a "genocide". The Greens were criticised by Reform and Labour for producing campaign material in Urdu, Bengali, Arabic, and Pashto. Lucy Powell accused the Green Party of "whipping up hatred" among British Muslims over the Labour government's perceived support for the Gaza genocide. Spencer responded by accusing Powell of using "racist dogwhistles", while Green Deputy Leader Mothin Ali said the Labour Party was "desperate" and that its attitude led to Muslim communities "being taken for granted" and "the subsequent rise of the far right".

The Greens apologised to political scientist Robert Ford after he complained that his quotes were used "out of context" on leaflets without consulting him to give the impression that he supported the party's chances of winning the by-election. On the weekend of 7 February, a group of Green campaigners were removed from an assisted living residence in Burnage after their door-to-door canvassing raised concerns among elderly residents. A Green spokesperson apologised and stated that an investigation had been launched. The Green campaign experienced extensive misinformation circulated about Spencer online. Spencer was accompanied by security at official events after receiving verbal abuse influenced by online misinformation; in one incident a man shouted verbal abuse, accusing Spencer of being a "fake plumber". Spencer left Twitter during the campaign due to harassment and threats she had received in direct messages.

== Endorsements ==
=== Hannah Spencer (Green Party) ===
- Jeremy Corbyn, MP for Islington North (1983–present), co-founder of Your Party and former leader of the Labour Party (2015–2020)
- The Morning Star, newspaper
- The Muslim Vote, pressure group
- Socialist Worker, newspaper
- Zarah Sultana, MP for Coventry South (2019–present) and co-founder of Your Party
- Salma Yaqoob, former leader of the Respect Party (2005–2012)

=== Angeliki Stogia (Labour Party) ===
- Alliance for Workers' Liberty, third camp Trotskyist political party
- Vince Cable, former leader of the Liberal Democrats, advocated a tactical vote

=== Matt Goodwin (Reform UK) ===
- Tommy Robinson, far-right activist and co-founder of the English Defence League (rejected by Reform UK and Goodwin)

=== Nick Buckley (Advance UK) ===
- Tommy Robinson, far-right activist and co-founder of the English Defence League

== Tactical voting ==
Three tactical voting organisations (Forward Democracy, TacticalVote.co.uk, and Tactical.Vote) endorsed voting for the Green Party as the party best placed to defeat Reform UK. A Labour campaign leaflet delivered in the constituency the day before the election claimed that an organisation called "Tactical Choice" had recommended voting Labour. No such organisation appears to exist, and the Green Party accused Labour of making up "an entirely fictitious organisation".

== Hustings and debates ==
Goodwin dropped out of the Local Voices hustings event on 10 February saying that he did not attend due to concerns about the impartiality. Labour and the Greens criticised him for withdrawing, with Labour accusing him of dropping out after requesting a private green room and attempting to "pack" the hustings with supporters from outside the constituency.

No.	Date	Location	Host	Candidates										Ref.
P Participant A Absent				Cadden (Cons)	Goodwin (Reform)	Pearcey (Lib Dem)	Spencer (Green)	Stogia (Labour)	Buckley (Advance)	Clarke (Libertarian)	Moore (SDP)	O'Meachair (Rejoin)	Wils (Communist)	Ref.
1	10 February 2026, 7pm	Gorton Methodist Church, Gorton	Local Voices	A	A	P	P	P	P	A	P	A	P	
2	12 February 2026, 2pm	Mitchell Henry House, Chadderton	Manchester Evening News	P	P	P	P	P	A	A	A	A	A	
3	12 February 2026, 7pm	St Peter's Church, Levenshulme	Levenshulme Community Association	P	P	P	P	P	P	P	P	P	P	
4	16 February 2026	MediaCityUK, Salford	BBC Radio Manchester	P	P	P	P	P	A	A	A	A	A	

== Opinion polling ==
Date(s) conducted	Pollster	Client	Sample size	Labour	Reform	Green	Cons	Lib Dem	Others	Lead
26 Feb 2026	2026 by-election			25.4%	28.7%	40.7%	1.9%	1.8%	1.4% OMRLP 0.4% Adv 0.4% REU 0.3% LPUK 0.1% SDP 0.1% CL 0.1%	12
16–24 Feb 2026	Opinium	Byline Times/Forward Democracy	401 (Note: Excluding those who would not vote or answered "Don't know", there were 339 respondents who gave an answer.)	28%	27%	28%	6%	4%	6% REU 2% Adv 2% LPUK 1% OMRLP 1% SDP 0%	Tie
13–19 Feb 2026	Omnisis	Opal Ltd	452 (Note: Excluding those who would not vote or answered "Don't know", there were 271 respondents who gave an answer.)	26%	29%	33%	5%	2%	5% REU 3% LPUK 1% SDP 1% Adv 0% OMRLP 0% CL 0%	4
3 Feb 2026	List of candidates published for by-election									
25–27 Jan 2026	Find Out Now	Betterworld Ltd	143 (Note: Excluding those who would not vote or answered "Don't know", there were 51 respondents who gave an answer.)	33%	36%	21%	8%	3%	0%	3
4 Jul 2024	2024 general election			50.8%	14.1%	13.2%	7.9%	3.8%	10.3% Workers 10.3%	36.7

On 28 January, The Telegraph reported on a poll by Find Out Now, which surveyed Gorton and Denton residents. The head of research at Find Out Now confirmed to the paper that the small sample size of just 143 carried a high margin of error. After adjusting for turnout and removing those who answered "don't know", the final voting intention calculation had a sample size of only 51 for the general poll and 57 for the hypothetical poll. The poll was criticised by other pollsters due to this small sample size. Find Out Now apologised for "any impression that the data was more precise than it could be", and said that the poll "should not be analysed beyond" the suggestion that the race is likely to be close, adding that it does not indicate whether one party is in the lead.

It was reported that internal polling for Reform UK had themselves in first, with the Greens in second. The Greens also shared canvassing data based on 18,000 conversations showing them 0.2 points behind Reform, with Labour in third. On 28 January, The Independent reported that pollster Lord Hayward said he can "foresee the Greens winning". Before the Workers Party withdrew from the campaign, political scientist John Curtice suggested the election would be "a four-way fight between Labour, Reform, the Greens and George Galloway". Academic Robert Ford described the by-election as a "pollster's nightmare", and said that any of Reform, Labour, or the Greens could win.

Hypothetical polling with Andy Burnham as the Labour candidate

Date(s) conducted	Pollster	Client	Sample size	Labour (Burnham)	Reform	Green	Cons	Lib Dem	Other	Lead
27 Feb–8 Mar 2026	Survation	N/A	501	47%	21%	25%	—	—	7%	22
25–27 Jan 2026	Find Out Now	Betterworld Ltd	143 (Note: Excluding those who would not vote or answered "Don't know", there were 57 respondents who gave an answer.)	53%	30%	8%	7%	2%	0%	23
4 Jul 2024	2024 general election			50.8%	14.1%	13.2%	7.9%	3.8%	10.3%: Workers 10.3%	36.7

== Result ==
Turnout for the by-election was 47.5%, only fractionally down on the 47.8% turnout in the constituency in the 2024 general election.

2026 Gorton and Denton by-election
Party	Candidate	Votes	%	±%
Green	Hannah Spencer	14,980	40.7	+27.5
Reform	Matt Goodwin	10,578	28.7	+14.6
Labour	Angeliki Stogia	9,364	25.4	−25.4
Conservative	Charlotte Cadden	706	1.9	−6.0
Liberal Democrats	Jackie Pearcey	653	1.8	−2.0
Monster Raving Loony	Sir Oink A-Lot	159	0.4	N/A
Advance UK	Nick Buckley	154	0.4	N/A
Rejoin EU	Joseph O'Meachair	98	0.3	N/A
Libertarian	Dan Clarke	47	0.1	N/A
SDP	Sebastian Moore	46	0.1	N/A
Communist League	Hugo Wils	29	0.1	N/A
Majority		4,402	12.0	
Turnout		36,814	47.5	−0.3
Rejected ballots		90	0.2	
Registered electors		77,501		
Green gain from Labour Co-op		Swing	26.4	

== Previous result ==
General election 2024: Gorton and Denton
Party	Candidate	Votes	%	±%
Labour Co-op	Andrew Gwynne	18,555	50.8	−16.4
Reform	Lee Moffitt	5,142	14.1	+9.2
Green	Amanda Gardner	4,810	13.2	+10.7
Workers Party	Amir Burney	3,766	10.3	N/A
Conservative	Ruth Welsh	2,888	7.9	−11.0
Liberal Democrats	John Reid	1,399	3.8	−2.0
Majority		13,413	36.7	−11.7
Turnout		36,735	48.0	−13.9
Registered electors		76,524		
Labour notional hold		Swing	−12.8	

== Aftermath ==
=== Analysis ===
Hannah Spencer won the by-election to become the Green Party's fifth MP and first in Northern England. It was the first parliamentary election since Zack Polanski's election as leader of the Green Party, and the subsequent large increase in Green membership in 2025. It became the first ever parliamentary by-election win for the Greens, and their highest ever vote share in a by-election, quadrupling their previous best result of 10.2% in the 2023 Somerton and Frome by-election. The result was the seventh largest Labour majority to be overturned at a by-election, and the party's first loss in Gorton since 1931. Reform UK achieved its second-highest vote share at a by-election. The Conservatives received their lowest ever vote share in a by-election, and also lost their election deposit for the first time since 1962.

Elections analyst John Curtice noted the rise of newer parties, with the Greens and Reform UK coming first and second, and described the result as "seismic", comparing it with the 1962 Orpington by-election for its historic impact. The BBC's Henry Zeffman also referred to increasing fragmentation in British politics. The outcome was what Robert Ford had previously suggested may mark the end of Labour's electoral Tinkerbell effect, with commentators noting the result was "Labour's most feared outcome – the Greens winning and potentially displacing it as the choice of anti-Reform voters", thus causing serious problems for Labour's strategy of neglecting its base while focusing on supporters who had switched to Reform. It also made the prospect of the Greens replacing Labour far more plausible than it had been seen previously. The Institute for Government's Hannah White wrote that the result showed British politics was "dangerously underprepared for a multi-party future" and called for electoral reform of the first-past-the-post electoral system to avoid driving down civic engagement and undermining the political legitimacy of future governments.

=== Reactions ===
Many commentators credited the Greens' victory to its consolidation of the Muslim vote away from the Labour Party following the expulsion of Jeremy Corbyn, infighting in Your Party, and disillusionment of Muslims with the Labour Party over its handling of the ongoing Gaza war. Keir Starmer called the result "very disappointing" and said: "I will not stop fighting the extremes of politics: the extreme on the right in Reform, the extreme on the left in the Green Party." Starmer also wrote to Labour MPs that the Green Party was "able to capitalise on an endorsement" from the Workers Party leader George Galloway and spoke of "sectarian politics", a term also used by Reform to express blame for its defeat. Matt Goodwin said: "We are losing our country. A dangerous Muslim sectarianism has emerged." In response, former first minister of Scotland Humza Yousaf stated: "Apparently Muslim sectarianism just helped a socially progressive party led by a gay Jewish man win!"

Nigel Farage said that Goodwin had more votes than Spencer among British-born voters. Spencer criticised his claim, accusing him of "talking racist nonsense", and pointing out that the ballot was secret, so Farage did not know who voted for which party. Sunder Katwala, director of the think tank British Future, said that the Greens would have won the election among UK-born voters, and that polling indicated that Reform and the Greens likely each won about a third of the white British vote. Polanski accused Labour of running a smear campaign and lying to the British public about Green Party policies, and said he reported Labour to the police for driving a van displaying attack ads past a polling station on election day. Greater Manchester Police confirmed it was investigating the incident. Starmer later accepted that "voters are impatient for change".

Many commentators speculated that Andy Burnham could have retained the seat for Labour, especially as he had previously beaten Spencer in the 2024 Greater Manchester mayoral election. Lucy Powell said she believed that Burnham would have won if he had been the candidate. After the by-election result, Burnham publicly congratulated Spencer on her "historic win", stating that he had been isolating with COVID-19 during the final stages of the campaign. Spencer acknowledged Burnham's local popularity, stating that if he had been the candidate, she would have faced a "harder fight". Polling also suggested that Burnham may have led Labour to a win, according to both an early poll carried out by Find Out Now and a post-by-election poll carried out by Survation (see: Opinion polls).

House of Lords member and former Labour deputy leader Tom Watson called on the government not to "shift left", arguing that the Greens benefitted from a "temporary coalition of protest voters, identity voters and signal senders, which can look like a governing majority until polling day is over". He also said he believed that Burnham would not have won the by-election. The Labour Party's post-election analysis found it lost significant numbers of white working-class voters to the Greens, in addition to young progressives and Muslim voters. The analysis also found that the two biggest reasons that voters abandoned Labour for the Greens were to vote tactically to keep Reform out and to vote in protest to send Labour a message.

=== Allegations of family voting in polling stations ===
The group Democracy Volunteers said it visited 22 of the constituency's 45 polling stations, spending 30 to 45 minutes observing each, and witnessed family voting in 15 of them. It said that of the sample of 545 individuals observed casting their vote, it saw 32 cases of family voting in total – a form of voting fraud in which families enter a polling booth together and collude or discuss their voting intentions – including nine cases in one polling station. This amounted to evidence of family voting in 12 per cent of total votes observed by Democracy Volunteers in Gorton and Denton.

Manchester City Council said that their staff had not seen "any evidence of undue influence on voters", that no issues were reported, and that Democracy Volunteers should have raised the issues during polling hours. John Ault, the group's director, responded that it was "a normal international standard not to issue a comment until after voting has finished". Farage described the election as "a victory for ... cheating", and the Green Party accused Farage of attempting to undermine a democratic result, comparing it to Donald Trump's "playbook". Reform chair David Bull told the BBC that the problem was probably not significant enough to have affected the result. Reform UK and the Conservatives formally raised a complaint with the Electoral Commission, with Reform UK also reporting the matter to the police. A spokesperson for the Electoral Commission said that the statutory code of practice was that observers were expected to raise potential irregularities with officials "on the spot" and that electoral offences were a police matter.

Following its investigation, which involved reviewing CCTV footage and interviewing volunteers and observers, Greater Manchester Police concluded there was "no evidence" of illegal family voting or voting coercion at polling stations. The Democracy Volunteers observers reported instances of more than one voter going into a booth at the same time, and instances of people looking over the shoulder of voters, but they did not allege any verbal instruction or physical conduct that indicated one person was directing or coercing another regarding how to vote, and were unable to provide the police with the times of the alleged offences or descriptions of those allegedly involved.

=== Polling for the next general election ===
On 3 March, YouGov published an opinion poll showing the Greens in second on 21%, a four-point increase from the previous week and two points behind Reform on 23%. This was the highest recorded score for Greens by YouGov. A spokesperson for YouGov attributed the increase in support to the by-election.

== See also ==
- 2026 Manchester City Council election, held on 7 May
- 2026 United Kingdom local elections, held on 7 May
- 2025 Caerphilly by-election – showed similar patterns of anti-Reform tactical voting for a third party candidate and a poor performance by the Labour Party
- 2026 Makerfield by-election, in which Andy Burnham was elected to parliament four months later
- Green Party of England and Wales election results
- UK parliamentary by-elections
- United Kingdom by-election records
- List of United Kingdom by-elections (2024–present)
- Premiership of Keir Starmer
