= Hyde Hall, Denton =

Listed building in Greater Manchester, England

Hyde Hall
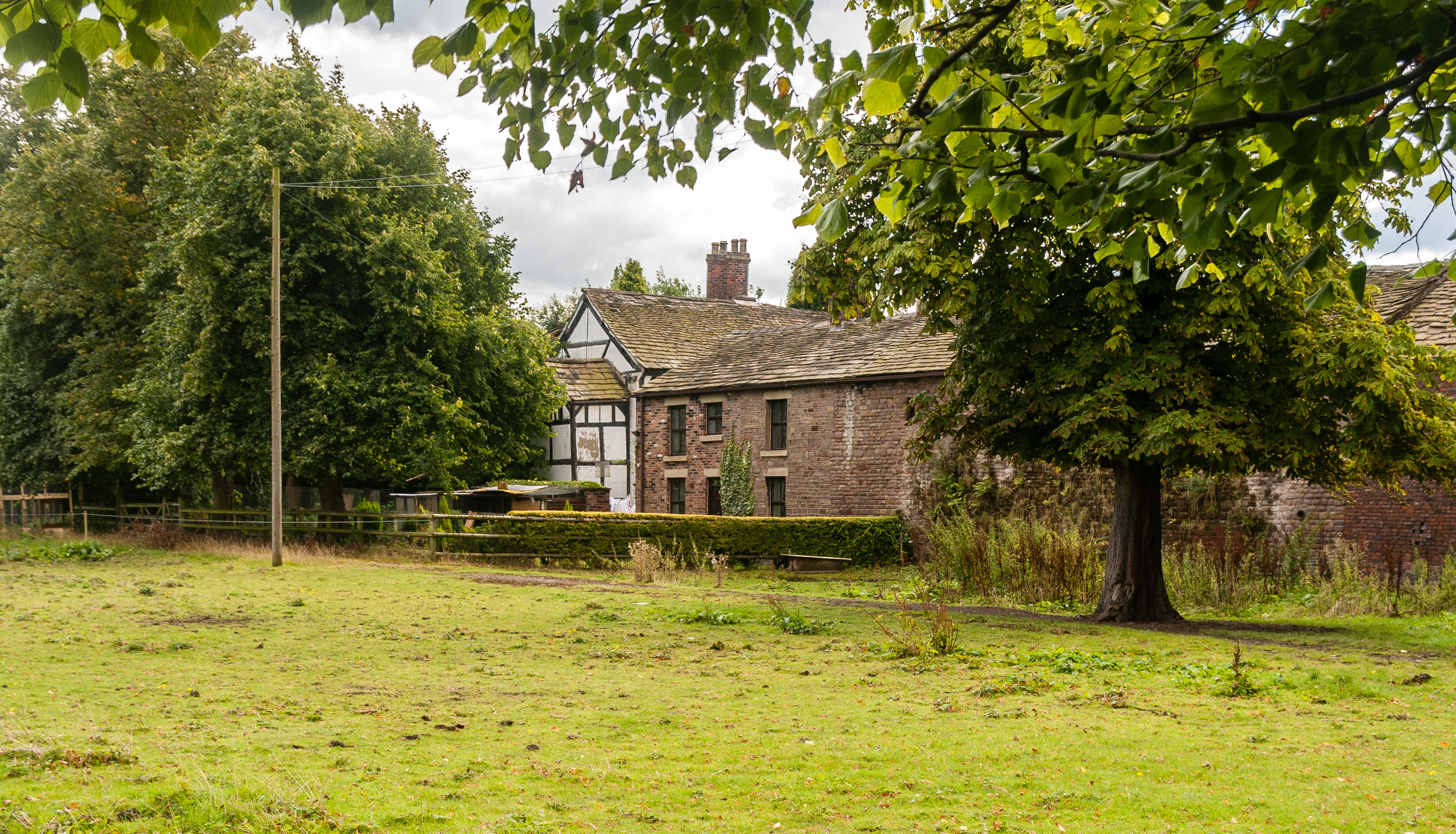
- Hyde Hall

- Location within Greater Manchester

General information
- Status: Vacant
- Location: Denton, Greater Manchester, England
- Coordinates: 53.44513°N 2.12492°W
- Year built: Late 16th century

Design and construction
- Designations

Listed Building – Grade II*
- Official name: Hyde Hall
- Designated: 27 November 1967
- Reference no.: 1318129

Hyde Hall in Denton, a town in Tameside, Greater Manchester, England, is a Grade II* listed building and was home to a branch of the Hyde family of Denton and Hyde.

The building was partially built with timber and then was partially faced with brick and stone. Below the Hyde coat of arms is an inscription dating the hall to at least 1625, and was originally built in the 16th or 17th century. In 1642 one of the residents of Hyde Hall, Robert Hyde, raised troops to aid the besieged Parliamentarians in Manchester during the English Civil War.

The hall is privately owned and is listed on the Buildings at Risk Register, rating its condition as "very bad". The roof structure has partially failed and the interior is being destroyed by the weather. There is no plan in place to repair the hall or to bring it back into use.

== See also ==
- Grade II* listed buildings in Greater Manchester
- Listed buildings in Denton, Greater Manchester
