= St Lawrence's Church, Denton =

Church in Greater Manchester, England

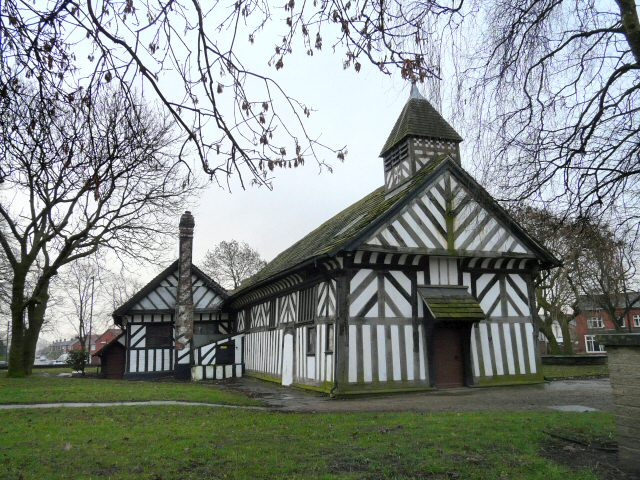
- St Lawrence's Church in 2009

- Location in Greater Manchester
- 53.4520°N 2.1109°W
- Address: Town Lane, Denton, Greater Manchester, England
- Denomination: Church of England
- Website: www.stlawrencedenton.org.uk

History
- Status: Parish church
- Dedication: St Lawrence

Architecture
- Heritage designation: Grade II*
- Designated: 27 November 1967
- Architect(s): J. Medland Taylor and Henry Taylor (1872)
- Architectural type: Church
- Years built: c. 1530 (nave); 1872 (chancel and transepts)

Specifications
- Materials: Timber-framed

Administration
- Province: Province of York
- Diocese: Diocese of Manchester

St Lawrence's Church is a timber-framed church on Town Lane in Denton, a town in Tameside, Greater Manchester, England (grid reference SJ92639506). It is one of only 29 surviving timber-framed churches and chapels in England. The chapelry of Denton was established in 1531 with the construction of a chapel of ease, then Roman Catholic, within the Diocese of Lichfield and dedicated to St James.

The church was rededicated to St Lawrence in 1839 and became a parish church in 1854. In 1872 it was expanded and remodelled by J. Medland Taylor and Henry Taylor. The building contains 16th-century stained glass and was designated a Grade II* listed building in 1967. It was restored between 1993 and 2003, funded by Tameside Council, and further restoration began in 2009.

== See also ==
- Grade II* listed buildings in Greater Manchester
- Listed buildings in Denton, Greater Manchester
- List of churches in Greater Manchester
