= Felt Hatters' and Trimmers' Unions of Great Britain =

Former trade union of the United Kingdom

- Amalgamated Society of Journeymen Felt Hatters and Allied Workers; Amalgamated Felt Hat Trimmers, Woolformers and Allied Workers Union
- Merged into: National Union of Tailors and Garment Workers
- Founded: 1872, 1888
- Dissolved: 1982
- Headquarters: 14 Walker Street, Denton, Greater Manchester
- Location: United Kingdom
- Members: 8,747 and 2,833 (1943)
- Key people: Thomas Mallalieu
- Affiliations: TUC, GFTU, Labour

The Felt Hatters' and Trimmers' Unions of Great Britain was a general term for two closely related trade unions representing workers in the hat-making industry in the United Kingdom.

The Amalgamated Society of Journeymen Felt Hatters and Allied Workers (ASJFH) was founded in 1872. It brought together various local unions, to represent men working in the hat-making industry. Based in Denton, Greater Manchester, it gradually expanded its membership, first to Stockport, then to London, Atherstone, Nuneaton and St Albans.

One of the ASJFH's early campaigns was against the employment of women in the industry in the West Midlands. Having lost this dispute, in 1888 it formed the Amalgamated Felt Hat Trimmers, Woolformers and Allied Workers Union (AFHTW&AWF) to represent women working in the industry. Despite being registered as separate unions, the two operated from the same office and had the same general secretary, invariably a man. However, their funds were kept separately, and the women's union offered fewer benefits. The women's union campaigned for women's suffrage, and co-sponsored the 1906 United Manifesto with organisations including the Women's Social and Political Union.

From 1893, the organisations began producing union labels for members to place inside hats they had made. The unions undertook a major strike in 1907, in an attempt to prevent the employment of youths on certain machines. The resolution of this led to an unusual position where the unions had a role in regulating apprenticeships in the industry, restricting their numbers to a maximum of one-fifth the number of journeymen in any workplace.

During World War II, the union was one of a handful of organisations specifically listed in the Nazi Black Book as dangerously Marxist. In 1939, the unions began admitting unskilled workers in the industry. By 1943, the men's union had a membership of 8,747, and the women's union had 2,833 members. However, this proved a peak, and by 1980, memberships had fallen to 526 and 627 respectively.

In 1982 the unions merged into the National Union of Tailors and Garment Workers.

== General Secretaries ==
1879: George Wilde
1895: Thomas Mallalieu
1935: Fred Worthington
1967: Harold Walker
1982:
