= Listed buildings in Denton, Greater Manchester =

Denton is a town in Tameside, Greater Manchester, England. The town and the township of Haughton contain 18 listed buildings that are recorded in the National Heritage List for England. Of these, one is listed at Grade I, the highest of the three grades, three are at Grade II*, the middle grade, and the others are at Grade II, the lowest grade.

Denton was a scattered rural community until coal mining started in the late 18th century, and in the 19th century it became a centre for the hatting industry. The earliest listed buildings are a church and a mounting block in the churchyard, a house with associated farm buildings, and a farmhouse. The buildings from the 19th century include houses, a workshop, churches and associated structures, a bandstand, and a war memorial.

== Key ==
Grade	Criteria
I	Buildings of exceptional interest, sometimes considered to be internationally important
II*	Particularly important buildings of more than special interest
II	Buildings of national importance and special interest

== Buildings ==
Name and location	Photograph	Date	Notes	Grade
Mounting block 53.45208°N 2.11256°W	—	Medieval (possible)	The mounting block is near the lychgate of St Lawrence's Church. It consists of a single piece of stone hewn into two steps.	II
St Lawrence's Church; 53.45223°N 2.11244°W		c. 1530	The chancel and transepts were added in 1872 by J. Medland and Harry Taylor in a similar style to the original. The church is timber framed, partly weatherboarded and rendered, and painted to resemble timber framing, and it has a stone-slate roof. The church consists of a nave on a stone plinth, a chancel and north and south transepts. At the west end is a bellcote with a pyramidal roof. The windows are mullioned, the bargeboards are decorated with rosettes, and there is a five-light east window.	II*
Hyde Hall; 53.44523°N 2.12478°W		Late 16th century	A house, later a farmhouse, the porch was added in 1625, and an extension in the 18th century. It is partly timber framed, partly in stone, largely rendered, with a brick extension and a stone-slate roof. The house has two storeys and a T-shaped plan, with a main range of two bays, a projecting cross-wing, and a one-bay extension. In the angle is a two-storey porch with a segmental-headed outer doorway and a Tudor arched inner doorway, a six-light window, a moulded band, a sundial, and a cornice. Most of the windows are mullioned and transomed. Inside are an inglenook and a bressumer.	II*
Farm buildings, Hyde Hall; 53.44547°N 2.12559°W		1687	The farm buildings form three sides of a courtyard, the oldest being timber framed and on the west side. The other buildings are in brick with roofs of slate and stone-slate, they were built at intervals during the 19th century, and most have two storeys. At the entrance to the yard is an elliptical-headed archway with a keystone, above which is a gable with an open pediment containing an oculus and an arched recess with a dovecote. Around the buildings are round-arched openings and honeycomb vents.	II
Manor Farmhouse; 53.44223°N 2.09712°W	—	1735	A stone farmhouse with quoins and a 20th-century tile roof. It has a double-depth plan, two storeys, and a symmetrical front of five bays. The central doorway has a chamfered surround and a dated lintel. The windows on the front have segmental heads and most are mullioned. At the rear is a rendered 20th-century porch and 20th-century casement windows.	II
53 and 55 Stockport Road; 53.45476°N 2.11278°W	—	Early 19th century	A brick house on a stone plinth, with an eaves cornice and a slate roof. It has three storeys, the original part has three bays, and there is a later three-bay extension to the left with a basement, and a small two-storey wing at the rear. In the centre of the original part is a doorway with ¾ columns, a fanlight, and an open pediment. The windows in both parts are replacement casements with stone sills and wedge lintels.	II
Former domestic hatting workshop 53.45301°N 2.11350°W	—	Early 19th century	The workshop is in hand-made brick with a slate roof, and has two storeys and an almost square plan. The doorway and windows have slightly segmental arched heads, and the windows are sashes.	II
Haughton Dale House; 53.43534°N 2.10090°W	—	Early 19th century	Originally two houses, later combined into one, it is in stone house with quoins and a pyramidal slate roof. There are two storeys, two bays, and a pebbledashed extension to the rear left. The doorways and mullioned windows have segmental heads and hood moulds. On the upper floor is a heraldic panel.	II
Christ Church; 53.45603°N 2.12180°W		1848–53	A Commissioners' church by George Gilbert Scott in Gothic Revival style, it is in stone and has a slate roofs with coped gables. The church consists of a nave and aisles under separate roofs, a chancel and a northwest steeple. The steeple has a three-stage tower with an arched doorway, lancet windows, clock faces, and a broach spire with lucarnes.	II
St Mary's Church, Haughton Green; 53.43867°N 2.10181°W		1874–76	The church, designed by J. Medland and Henry Taylor, is timber framed on a brick plinth, with a brick tower and a slate roof containing dormer windows. It consists of a nave, a south aisle, a north porch, a chancel, and a tower with a baptistry in its base. The tower is octagonal with a terracotta band and a conical roof with gablets. The windows are mullioned, some also with transoms. The chancel has decorative timberwork, pargeting, and gables with enriched bargeboards.	II
Lychgate, St Mary's Church; 53.43904°N 2.10161°W		c. 1875	The lychgate is at the entrance to the churchyard of St Mary's Church, and was designed by J. Medland and Henry Taylor. It has dwarf stone walls, a timber frame and a slate roof. The gates are in timber and have cast iron hinges.	II
Lychgate and churchyard wall, St Lawrence's Church; 53.45195°N 2.11254°W		Late 19th century	The lychgate at the entrance to the churchyard consists of a timber frame with chamfered members carrying a stone-slate roof. The wall encloses the churchyard to the west and the south, and is in stone with triangular coping stones.	II
St Anne's Church; 53.45699°N 2.10120°W		1880–82	Designed by J. Medland and Harry Taylor, the church is in red brick with a tile roof. It has a cruciform plan, and consists of a nave with a polygonal west baptistry, a south porch, north and south transepts, a chancel with a vestry and an organ chamber, and a tower at the crossing. The tower has a truncated pyramidal roof, on which is a timber stage, surmounted by a swept pyramidal roof containing gabled dormers. In the angle between the nave and the south transept is an octagonal stair turret with a conical roof. Beneath the chancel and transepts is an undercroft, and in the south transept is a rose window.	I
St Anne's Rectory; 53.45715°N 2.10062°W		c. 1882	The rectory, by J. Medland and Harry Taylor, is in red brick with bands and a tile roof. It has two and three storeys, and consists of a central part and gabled cross-wings. In an angle is an octagonal stair tower with a six-light mullioned and transomed stair window and a conical roof. Between the wings is an open porch, and in the left cross-wing is a gabled oriel window. Most of the windows are sashes, and one of them has a carved tympanum panel.	II*
Lychgate and wall, St Anne's Church; 53.45680°N 2.10164°W		c. 1882	The lychgate at the entrance to the churchyard, and the wall surrounding the churchyard and rectory garden, were designed by J. Medland and Harry Taylor. The lychgate has dwarf brick walls, an oak frame, a tiled roof, and a cross finial. The walls are in brick with terracotta coping, and are stepped at intervals.	II
Bandstand; 53.45484°N 2.11560°W		Late 1890s	The bandstand is in Victoria Park and has a brick plinth, from which fluted cast iron columns support and octagonal swept roof. The railings are in cast iron, and there are scrolled brackets and a weathervane in wrought iron.	II
War memorial 53.45504°N 2.11601°W		1921	The war memorial is in Victoria Park, and is in white granite. It consists of a rectangular base, a flight of four cruciform steps, a cruciform chamfered plinth, a cruciform pedestal with a moulded cornice, and a tall tapering obelisk, stepped towards the top. In the front of the obelisk is an inscribed panel, and on the pedestal are panels with inscriptions and the names of those lost in the two World Wars.	II
Church of St Mary Our Lady of Sorrows; 53.45416°N 2.11403°W		1962–63	A Roman Catholic church in brick with a reinforced concrete hyperbolic paraboloid roof in four equal shells with steep corner peaks and supported on reinforced concrete piers. The church has a square plan arranged diamond-wise, with the entrance in one corner, and the sanctuary in the opposite corner, attached to a range containing two sacristies and two confessionals. Above the entrance is a canopy with a dalle de verre window above which is a Sanctus bell.	II
