= Egerton Park Arts College =

Coordinates: 53.4608°N 2.1216°W

Location
- Egerton Street; Denton, Greater Manchester, M34 3PB; England

Information
- Type: Community school
- Closed: August 2010
- Local authority: Tameside Metropolitan Borough Council
- Specialist: Arts College
- Department for Education URN: 106263 Tables
- Headteacher: Mr J D Hart
- Gender: Mixed
- Age: 11 to 16
- Enrolment: 1313

Egerton Park Arts College was a comprehensive school for boys and girls aged 11–16. Its address was Egerton Street, Denton, Tameside, Greater Manchester, M34 3PB.

== History ==
It used to be called Egerton Park Community High School, and previous to that Egerton Park Secondary Modern School. It also held specialist Arts College status.

== Merger ==
In 2010 Egerton Park merged with fellow Denton high school Two Trees Sports College, on the Egerton Park campus, creating a City Academy style high school. The name of the new school is Denton Community College. The students were on split sites but under the new Denton Community College branding (with Egerton Park being known as 'North Campus' and Two Trees 'South Campus') until the new school building opened on 10 January 2012 to students.

== Academic performance ==
The school had no sixth form. In the years before closure, at GCSE the school got results under the England average, although a few per cent under the Tameside average.

== Notable alumni ==
- Andrew Gwynne, local MP for Denton and Reddish
- Samantha Siddall, actress known for her role as Mandy Maguire in Channel 4 series Shameless
- James Stannage, late night presenter on Key 103
- Reni (musician) Alan John "Reni" Wren, Drummer from The Stone Roses
