= Fred Worthington (trade unionist) =

British trade unionist

Fred Worthington (1891 or 1892 – 15 June 1973) was a British trade union leader.

Worthington lived in Denton and worked making hats for T. B. Moores. He joined the Amalgamated Society of Journeymen Felt Hatters, and in 1935 he was elected as its general secretary. The union only admitted men, but Worthington also became the leader of its counterpart for women workers, the Amalgamated Felt Hat Trimmers, Woolformers and Allied Workers Union.

In 1936, Worthington was also elected to the management committee of the General Federation of Trade Unions, and he served as its chair in 1949 and 1950. He was also elected to Denton Urban District Council, serving on the body for more than forty years. He served as a Labour Co-operative member, and was the first person to chair the council for three years in succession. His employer, Moores, also served on the council, but as a Conservative.

Worthington retired from his trade union posts in 1967, already aged 75, and died six years later. In his spare time, he served as a justice of the peace and a deputy lieutenant. In the 1954 New Year Honours, he was made an Officer of the Order of the British Empire.

Trade union offices
Preceded by Thomas Mallalieu	Secretary of the Amalgamated Society of Journeymen Felt Hatters and Allied Workers and the Amalgamated Felt Hat Trimmers, Woolformers and Allied Workers Union; 1935–1967	Succeeded by Harold Walker
Preceded by Frank Dickinson	Chairman of the General Federation of Trade Unions; 1948–1950	Succeeded by Albert Knowles
