= St Thomas More Roman Catholic College =

St Thomas More RC College

Location
- Town Lane; Denton, Greater Manchester, M34 6AF; England; 53.4502°N 2.1150°W

Information
- Type: Voluntary aided school
- Motto: "...Bonus Dei Servitor Prius..." or "...the King's good servant but God's first..."
- Religious affiliation: Roman Catholic
- Established: 1964
- Local authority: Tameside
- Department for Education URN: 106271 Tables
- Ofsted: Reports
- Head teacher: Huw Brophy
- Gender: Coeducational
- Age: 11 to 16
- Website: https://www.stmcollege.org.uk/

St Thomas More RC College located in Denton, Greater Manchester, England is a comprehensive school previously known as St Thomas More RC High School.St Thomas More has a roll of approximately 780 pupils and 40 teaching staff.

The school was opened in 1964 and gained Specialist College status in Mathematics and Computing in 2004. Following its designation as a high performing specialist college it was awarded a second specialism in Applied Learning in 2008 and awarded Leading Edge status in 2010. In June 2023, Headteacher Huw Brophy announced that the school could become an Academy and join the Emmaus Catholic Academy Trust. As of December 2023, the school is listed as an "Academy Converter" on the governments "Get Information about Schools" service and is expected to become an Academy by the end of January 2024.
