= St Anne's Church, Haughton =

Church in Tameside, Greater Manchester, England

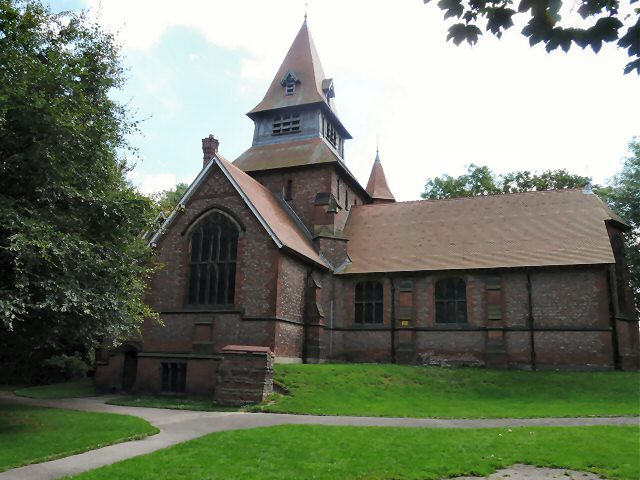

- Location within Greater Manchester

Religion
- Affiliation: Anglican
- District: Diocese of Manchester
- Ecclesiastical or organizational status: Parish church

Location
- Location: Denton, Greater Manchester, England
- Interactive map of St Anne's Church, Haughton
- Coordinates: 53.4461°N 2.1044°W

Architecture
- Architect: J. Medland Taylor
- Type: Church
- Style: Gothic Revival
- Completed: 1882
- Materials: Brick timber structure with clay tile roof

Website
- www.stanneschurchdenton.co.uk

St Anne's Church is a Grade I listed building in Denton, a town in Tameside, Greater Manchester, England. The foundation stone was laid on 1 September 1880, and the church was completed on 29 July 1882. It was designed by J. Medland Taylor, and its construction was funded by E. Joseph Sidebotham, a member of the Sidebotham mill-owning family of Hyde. The church is built in brick in the Gothic Revival style and also incorporates timber framing.

It has been described as the best-known work of the architects, an "extraordinary free-form brick church that forms the nucleus of the most important cluster of their buildings' surviving." The lychgate and St Anne's Rectory adjoining the main church are also of architectural significance, and each is listed as a protected building in its own right.

== See also ==
- Grade I listed churches in Greater Manchester
- Listed buildings in Denton, Greater Manchester
- List of churches in Greater Manchester
