= Denton Community College =

Location
- Taylor Lane; Denton, Greater Manchester, M34 3NG; England; 53.4595°N 2.1219°W

Information
- Type: Academy secondary
- Motto: Outcomes Focused, Child Centred
- Established: 2010
- Local authority: Tameside
- Department for Education URN: 151485 Tables
- Ofsted: Reports
- Principal: Donald Cumming
- Gender: Mixed
- Age: 11 to 16
- Enrolment: 1352
- Colour: Purple
- Website: dca.northerneducationtrust.org

Denton Community College is a academy comprehensive school for boys and girls between the ages of 11 and 16 in Denton, Greater Manchester, England.

== History ==
The school originally opened on 1 September 2010, with a new £24 million building being built on the Egerton Park site as part of the borough's £300m Building Schools for the Future project. The school is an amalgamation of two other schools in the area that closed on 31 August 2010: Egerton Park Arts College and Two Trees Sports College in Denton. The school operated on two sites until 10 January 2012 when the new school building opened to students.

In 2015 the Denton Community College was reported as Good by Ofsted. Then in December 2022, the school was rated Inadequate by Ofsted. In November 2024, Ofsted reported that "Pupils and staff feel safe in the school...Classrooms are calm and purposeful". This was the last monitoring visit before that school closed.

The school was re-opened as an academy, part of the Northern Education Trust, in January 2025. Northern Education Trust is a multi-academy trust operating in the North of England, established in 2010. It operates both primary and secondary academies. The Northern Education Trust (NET) is a founder and member of the Northern Alliance of Trusts.
