= Thomas Mallalieu =

British trade unionist

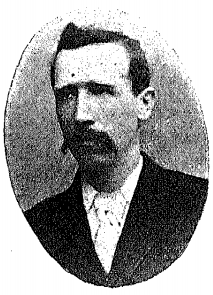
Mallalieu in 1901

Thomas Mallalieu (c. 1858 – 20 August 1935) was a British trade unionist.

Mallalieu was born in Witton-le-Wear, County Durham. He worked as a felt hat maker and was involved in uniting various local unions into a national federation, accomplished in 1879. He was involved in a major strike in the industry in 1892/93, and subsequently became general secretary of the Amalgamated Society of Journeymen Felt Hatters' and Trimmers' Associations. In this role, he avoided industrial action and focused on signing workplace agreements with employers, remaining in post until his death in 1935.

Mallalieu was also politically active, and served as a Labour Party member of Denton Urban District Council for twenty years, where he promoted road widening and the creation of a public park. He chaired the council in 1924/25. He was also prominent in the Industrial Alliance Organisation and the General Federation of Trade Unions, serving as its President from 1918 to 1922.

In the 1930s, Mallalieu was concerned about a decrease in the number of men wearing hats, complaining that "...adherents of this semi-wild craze are no less in number, and in our hat-manufacturing centres youths brazenly walk the streets at times and don't seem to be ostracized".

He died in Denton, Lancashire, aged 77.

Trade union offices
Preceded by George Wilde	Secretary of the Amalgamated Society of Journeymen Felt Hatters and Allied Workers and the Amalgamated Felt Hat Trimmers, Woolformers and Allied Workers Union; 1895 – 1935	Succeeded by Fred Worthington
Preceded by Joseph Cross	Chairman of the General Federation of Trade Unions; 1920 – 1922	Succeeded by Alfred Short
