= Hannah Spencer =

British politician (born 1991)

Hannah Spencer MP
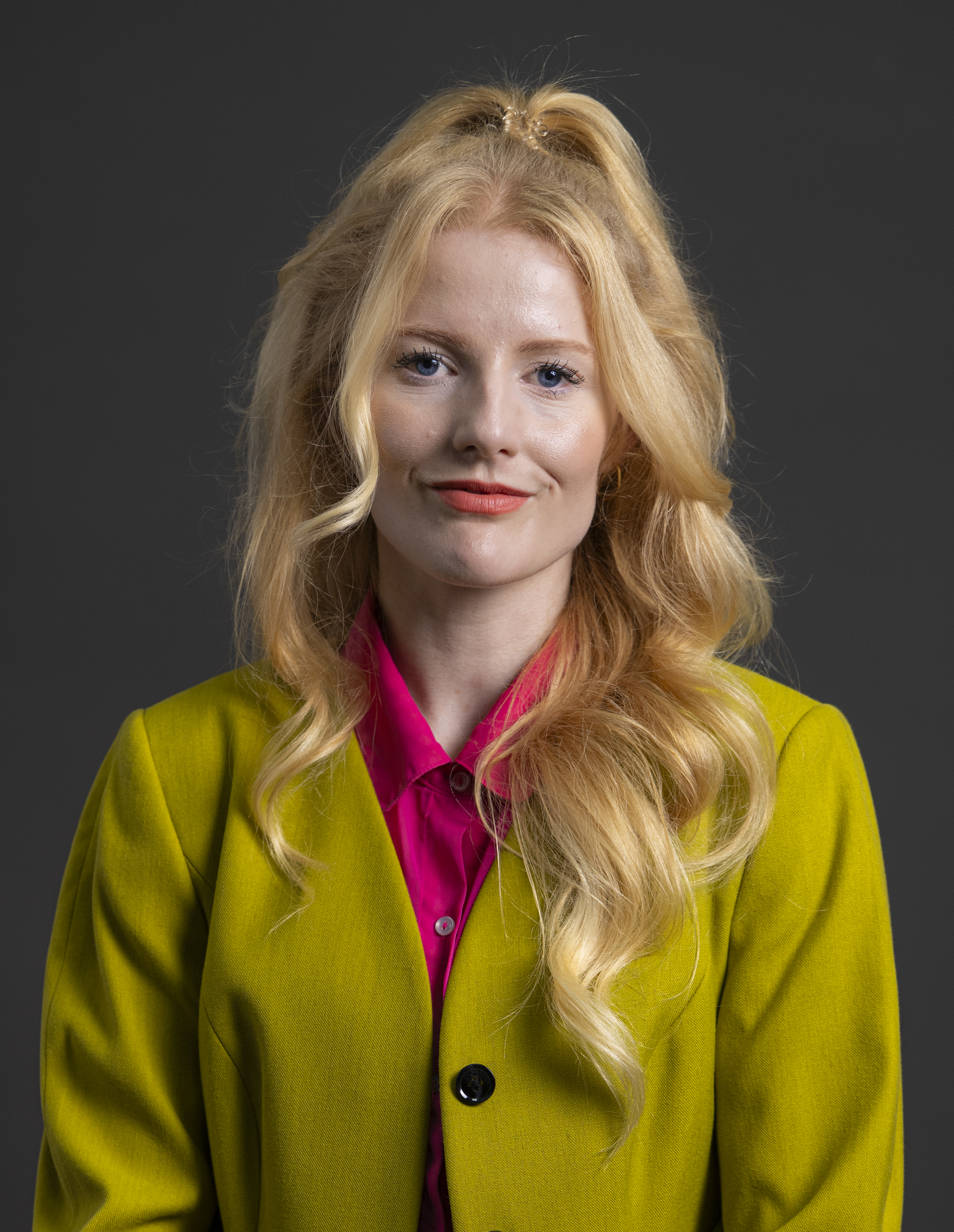
- Official portrait, 2026

Member of Parliament for Gorton and Denton
- Incumbent
- Assumed office 26 February 2026
- Preceded by: Andrew Gwynne
- Majority: 4,402 (11.9%)

Green Party Group Leader on Trafford Council
- In office 21 May 2025 – 5 March 2026
- Deputy: Jane Leicester
- Preceded by: Michael Welton
- Succeeded by: Geraldine Coggins

Member of Trafford Council for Hale
- In office 4 May 2023 – 7 May 2026
- Preceded by: Ward established
- Succeeded by: Rupert Kelly

Personal details
- Born: Hannah Kathrine Spencer; 19 April 1991 (age 35) Bolton, Greater Manchester, England
- Party: Green Party of England and Wales
- Education: Bolton College
- Occupation: Politician; plumber; plasterer

Hannah Kathrine Spencer (born 19 April 1991) is a British Green Party politician and tradesperson who has served as the member of Parliament (MP) for Gorton and Denton since the February 2026 by-election. She is the first Green Party member to win a parliamentary by-election, and the party's first MP in the north of England.

Born in Bolton, Greater Manchester, Spencer left school at 16 and completed a National Vocational Qualification to become a plumber around 2008. Later, she completed training to qualify as a gas engineer and a plasterer, and became known as "Hannah the Plumber". Spencer entered politics due to her opposition to greyhound racing. She was a councillor for Hale on Trafford Council from 2023 until her election to Parliament in 2026. She was the Green Party group leader on the council from 2025 until 2026. Spencer was the Green Party's candidate in the 2024 Greater Manchester mayoral election, where she came fifth.

In 2026, Spencer was selected as the Green Party candidate for Gorton and Denton in the February by-election, following the resignation of the Labour Party incumbent, Andrew Gwynne. She won the by-election with 40.7% of the votes, a majority of 4,402. She campaigned for a £15 minimum wage; rent controls; lower energy bills; and free prescriptions, dentistry and eye care, and criticised Labour's handling of the Gaza war. Spencer took her seat in the House of Commons on 2 March, the week after the by-election. She was succeeded as Green Party group leader on Trafford Council by Geraldine Coggins on 5 March and did not contest her council seat of Hale in the May 2026 local election, which was then won by the Conservatives.

== Early life and education ==
Hannah Kathrine Spencer was born in Bolton, Greater Manchester, on 19 April 1991. Her mother was a nurse. She left school at 16; after leaving school, she attempted sixth form studies but dropped out. She became a plumber in around 2008, eventually completing a National Vocational Qualification (NVQ) in the trade at Bolton College. Her work included installing heat pumps. She later took an apprenticeship to complete an NVQ as a gas engineer. In 2014–15, she participated in the Prince's Trust Enterprise programme, at the end of which she established her own business, Hannah's Household Plumbing, "after years of struggling to go self-employed". In February 2026, she also qualified as a plasterer, having been the only woman on her course.

== Political career ==
Prior to getting involved in politics, Spencer campaigned against greyhound racing, especially at Belle Vue Stadium close to where she lived.

She joined the Green Party of England and Wales in 2022, saying in 2026 that she "was so angry at the gap between the super-rich and all the rest of us getting bigger." She also commented that she approved of the Green Party's member-led policymaking. She was elected councillor for the newly-created Hale ward on Trafford Council in the 2023 election, a part of Manchester previously held by the Conservative Party. Spencer was selected as leader of the Green Party group on Trafford Council in May 2025, succeeding Michael Welton.

Spencer stood as the Green Party candidate for mayor of Greater Manchester in the 2024 mayoral election, finishing in fifth place with 45,905 votes (6.9%), a then record result for the Green Party. She campaigned on addressing the cost-of-living and the climate crises, retrofitting more homes with insulation, encouraging active travel, and providing more support for domestic abuse victims.

Spencer was selected as the Green Party candidate for the Warrington North constituency in the 2024 general election, coming fifth with 1,889 votes (4.7%). In the 2025 Green Party internal elections, she stood for the position of local party support coordinator, losing to Rosie Rawle. She endorsed Zack Polanski in the 2025 Green Party leadership election. Spencer was appointed Green Party spokesperson for migration and refugee support in September 2025.

== Parliamentary career ==
=== Election ===
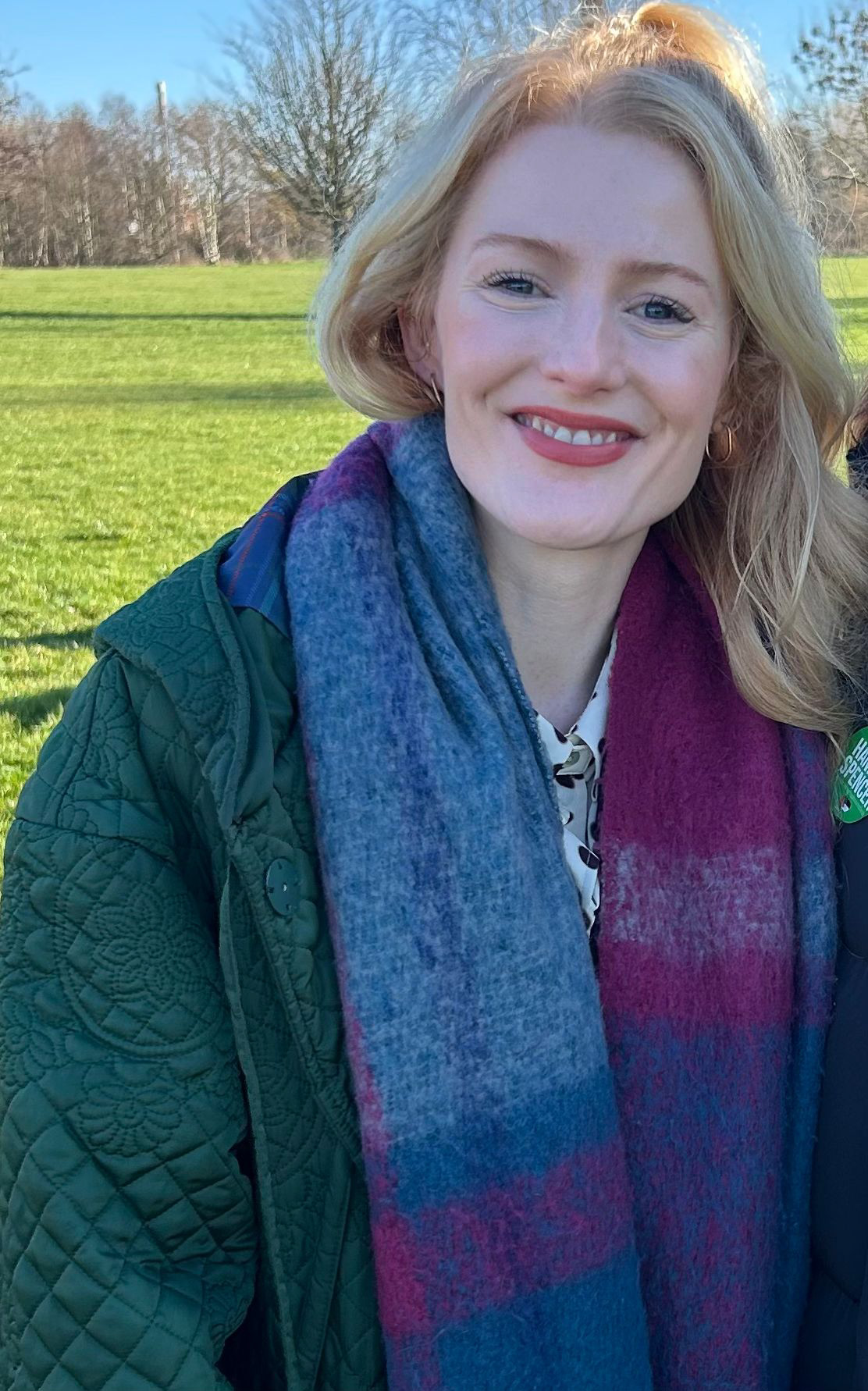
Spencer during the Gorton and Denton by-election campaign in February 2026

In January 2026, Spencer was selected as the Green Party candidate for Gorton and Denton in the February by-election, following the resignation of the Labour Party incumbent, Andrew Gwynne. In what became a three-way race between Labour, Reform UK, and the Green Party, she described the by-election as a contest of "Green v Reform. Hope v hate".

During the election campaign, Spencer, who became known as "Hannah the Plumber", emphasised that she was local to Manchester and argued that her work as a tradesperson, which regularly took her into ordinary people's homes, helped her have a strong sense of everyday voters' realities, and that members of Parliament should come from more diverse walks of life. Her campaign focused on the high cost of living, which she proposed to address by reducing inequality, partly via a wealth tax, and on supporting public services, including nationalising water supplies. Spencer also said that, if elected, she would campaign for a £15 minimum wage; rent controls; lower energy bills (partly through improved home insulation); and free prescriptions, dentistry and eye care. She criticised Labour's handling of the Gaza war, describing the Green Party as having a "proud history" of standing with Palestinians.

Spencer's campaign was the target of extensive misinformation on social media around her credentials and background. One image of an expensive property in Hale falsely claimed that she lived there. Users also falsely claimed that Spencer was married to a multimillionaire chief executive at AstraZeneca, although she is not married and the claim referred to a former partner, who was a scientist at AstraZeneca and not a chief executive. Following an incident of verbal abuse in which a man accused Spencer of being a "fake plumber" as a result of online misinformation, she attended campaign events accompanied by security.

Spencer won the by-election with 40.7% of the vote—a majority of 4,402—defeating Reform UK (28.7%) and Labour (25.4%) to become the Green Party's fifth MP and its first in the north of England. In her acceptance speech, she addressed those who voted for her, those who did not, the local Muslim communities, and the white working-class communities. She also referenced a child she met during the campaign, stating she had promised to try to improve the world and would always try to do the right thing. Writing for The Guardian, John Crace described the speech as "endearingly down to earth" and "an object lesson in grace".

The result was notable because Labour had held the constituency since 1931. The outcome was described as a blow to then-Prime Minister Keir Starmer, contributing to a leadership crisis that led to his resignation in May 2026. The political context also involved then-Mayor of Greater Manchester Andy Burnham, who had previously defeated Spencer in the 2024 Greater Manchester mayoral election by a margin of 375,000 votes. Prior to her election to Parliament, Spencer served as a local councillor on the Trafford Council within Greater Manchester, operating directly under the regional mayoral oversight of Burnham. Spencer noted that Burnham's local popularity would have made her campaign a "harder fight" had he been the Labour candidate. However, Burnham had been blocked from standing for the seat by Labour's national executive. Following Spencer's victory, Burnham publicly congratulated her on the historic win, noting that he had been isolating with COVID-19 during the final stages of the campaign. Burnham subsequently stood in the June 2026 Makerfield by-election, winning the seat comfortably before succeeding Starmer as Labour leader and Prime Minister in July 2026.

=== Early tenure ===
Spencer took her seat in the House of Commons on 2 March, the week after the by-election. She was succeeded as Green Party group leader on Trafford Council by Geraldine Coggins on 5 March, and did not contest her council seat in the May 2026 local election. During her first week in Parliament, Spencer announced that she was organising a cross-party group focusing on fuel poverty, and aiming to "accelerate the eradication of cold homes". On 5 March, which is World Book Day, she discussed literacy in her constituency, highlighting the need for libraries and schools to help children have access to books. She voted in favour of lowering the national voting age from 18 to 16, which is a long-standing Green Party policy. She also voted against a government motion to reject a Lords amendment that would have required schools in England to prohibit pupils from using or possessing smartphones during the school day.

On 8 March, Spencer gave a speech at an anti-racism event in Piccadilly Gardens, in the centre of Manchester. After her speech, footage showed that a YouTuber kept asking her "Are trans women women?" and "Can a woman have a penis?". Nearby, two men broke into a fight and started throwing punches, and others joined in. Police escorted Spencer to a nearby police car to avoid the conflict. A Green Party spokesperson later commented, highlighting that the incident occurred on International Women's Day, and describing this as a "bitter irony".

Spencer made her maiden speech in the House of Commons on 12 March 2026 in a debate marking International Women's Day.

On 26 April, Spencer criticised what she described as a drinking culture in Parliament during an interview with PoliticsJoe, stating that alcohol consumption was noticeable between votes. Her comments prompted criticism from Reform UK politician Nigel Farage and from other MPs, including from Labour. Polanski defended Spencer's comments. Polling done by YouGov a few days after the interview showed that 76% of the British public agreed with Spencer's position on the matter. Spencer raised the issue in Parliament during Prime Minister's Questions on 20 May 2026, with then-prime minister Keir Starmer welcoming her into Parliament, although his latter remarks did not relate to Spencer's question.

In September 2026, Spencer, along with 12 other MPs, was banned from entering the state of Israel, following sanctions on trade with Israel announced by Foreign Secretary Ed Miliband, as a response to Israel's unlawful occupation of Gaza and the West Bank. In response to this, the Green Party said it "will not be bullied into silence" by Israel.

== Personal life ==
As of 2024, Spencer lived in Trafford, Greater Manchester. She had previously lived in Levenshulme, which is part of the Gorton and Denton constituency. She owns four greyhounds who were rescued from greyhound racing, which she has campaigned against. She enjoys running, and completed a marathon in 2015, and the Manchester Marathon shortly after becoming an MP in 2026. When she was 22, she was listed in an article in The Guardian about the best-dressed people at the 2013 Glastonbury Festival.

Parliament of the United Kingdom
Preceded by Andrew Gwynne	Member of Parliament for Gorton and Denton; 2026–present	Incumbent
Party political offices
Preceded by Benali Hamdache	Green Party spokesperson for migration and refugee support 2025–present	Incumbent
Preceded by Michael Welton	Green Party Group Leader on Trafford Council; 2025–2026	Succeeded by Geraldine Coggins
Political offices
New title	Member of Trafford Council for Hale; 2023–2026	Succeeded by Rupert Kelly
