= Denton, Greater Manchester =

Town in Greater Manchester, England

Coordinates: 53.4554°N 2.1122°W

Denton
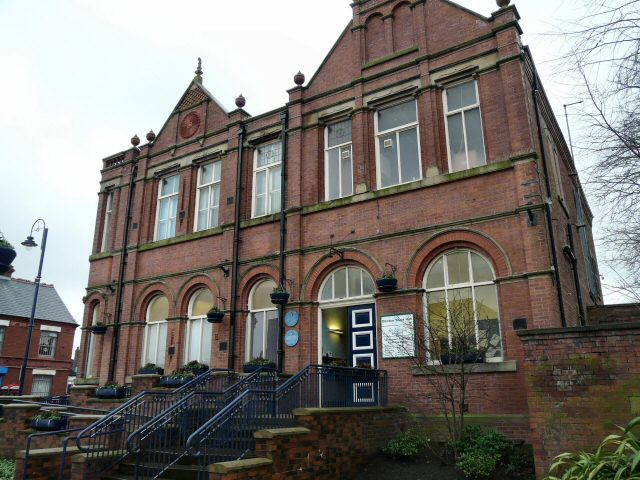
- Denton Town Hall

- Location within Greater Manchester
- Population: 36,591 (2011)
- OS grid reference: SJ925954
  - London: 202.4 mi
- Metropolitan borough: Tameside
- Metropolitan county: Greater Manchester
- Region: North West
- Country: England
- Sovereign state: United Kingdom
- Post town: MANCHESTER
- Postcode district: M34
- Dialling code: 0161
- Police: Greater Manchester
- Fire: Greater Manchester
- Ambulance: North West
- UK Parliament: Gorton and Denton

Denton is a town in Tameside, Greater Manchester, England. It lies east to Gorton in the City of Manchester and 5 miles (8 km) east of Manchester city centre. Historically part of Lancashire, it had a population of 36,591 at the 2011 Census.

== History ==
=== Toponymy ===
Denton probably derives its name from Dane-town, an etymology supported by other place names in the area such as Danehead-bank and Daneditch-bourne. The word 'Dane' is itself derived from Anglo-Saxon denu, dene, daenland, meaning a valley. So literally Denton means valley town.

=== Prehistory ===
A Byzantine coin was discovered in Danesheadbank, dating from the sixth or seventh century, as part of the Denton coin hoard. The early medieval linear earthwork Nico Ditch passes through Denton; it was probably used as an administrative boundary and dates from the 8th or 9th centuries. A 300 m stretch is still visible on Denton golf course, about 4 m wide and 1.5 m deep.

=== Middle Ages ===
In the early 13th century, it lay within the Manor of Withington; this was a feudal estate which also encompassed the townships of Withington, Didsbury, Chorlton-cum-Hardy, Moss Side, Rusholme, Burnage and Haughton, ruled by the Hathersage, Longford, Mosley and Tatton families.

=== Hat industry ===
Felt hatting was recorded in Denton as early as 1702 and the town gained supremacy in the hatting industry towards the end of the 19th century. The increasing importance of Denton and Haughton as centres of felt hat production is demonstrated by the increase of manufacturers in the area. In 1800, there were 4 hatting firms in Denton and Haughton but, by 1825, there were 25 manufacturers, making it the third largest hat making centre in the North West. By 1840, 24,000 felt hats were produced in Denton a week. The prosperity of the hatting industry is reflected in the growth of the town from 2,501 in 1801 to 6,759 in 1841.

During the 1840s, the felt hat industry went into depression; the recession affected Denton, with wages in the area falling by 35% and only 12 hat manufacturers remaining in Denton. The depression was partially due to changes in fashion away from felt towards silk hats. The revitalisation of the felt hat industry came in the 1850s, once again on a whim of fashion but also the increased use of machinery led to reduced production costs. The resurgence was demonstrated by the doubling of the number of hat manufacturers in the town between 1861 and 1872. At its peak in the Edwardian period, Denton's felt hat industry was the largest felt hat manufacturing centre in Britain. There were 36 firms directly involved in the felt hat making industry. In 1907, the majority of the 16,428,000 felt hats made in England (worth £2,068,000) were made in Denton and Stockport. In 1921, the working population of Denton was 9,653 with about 41% of those people in occupations related to the hatting industry. The last hat factory in Denton closed in 1980.

Although the felt hat industry in Denton and Haughton was prosperous and an integral part of the town, working conditions in the factories were not risk free. One of the problems workers faced was mercury poisoning; mercury was used to separate the fur from the rabbit hide and workers were in regular contact with fur impregnated with mercury or exposed to mercury vapour. Inadequate ventilation in some parts of the hat making process led to other sorts of dangers; solvents were also used and on 14 January 1901 there was an explosion at the factory of Joseph Wilson & Sons in Denton, killing 13 people and injuring many more. The explosion was of vapour from methylated spirits used in the dying process.

Throughout the 19th century and well into the 20th century, a wide range of hats was manufactured to suit all tastes and purses. The names used by the competing manufacturers to describe their products was bewildering and some of these were; felt hats, silk hats, fur hats, wear fur hats, soft hats, stiff hats, velour hats, wool hats, straw hats and, of course, the ubiquitous cloth cap. In the 1930s the 'Attaboy' trilby hat was introduced by the Denton Hat Company. This brand quickly became famous and it was in production for many years. Ladies' hats were not forgotten either and at least one works specialised in making these and the hat master's wife designed them at home. Hats were made for home consumption and for export. The well-known slogan "If you want to get ahead, get a hat" arose in Denton and, needless to say, anyone attending for a job interview not wearing a hat was quickly shown the door. Similarly, until the early 20th century, anyone entering a Denton shop without a hat would receive much cursing. The term, "mad as a hatter" also arose in Denton because the mercury used in the felting process led to mercury poisoning.

In 2003, the prominent Wilson's Hat Factory on Wilton Street, together with the adjacent mill-workers' houses, other factories, Wilton Street Chapel and Mainstream Studios was demolished to make way for a new retail shopping park Crown Point North.

=== Coal mining ===
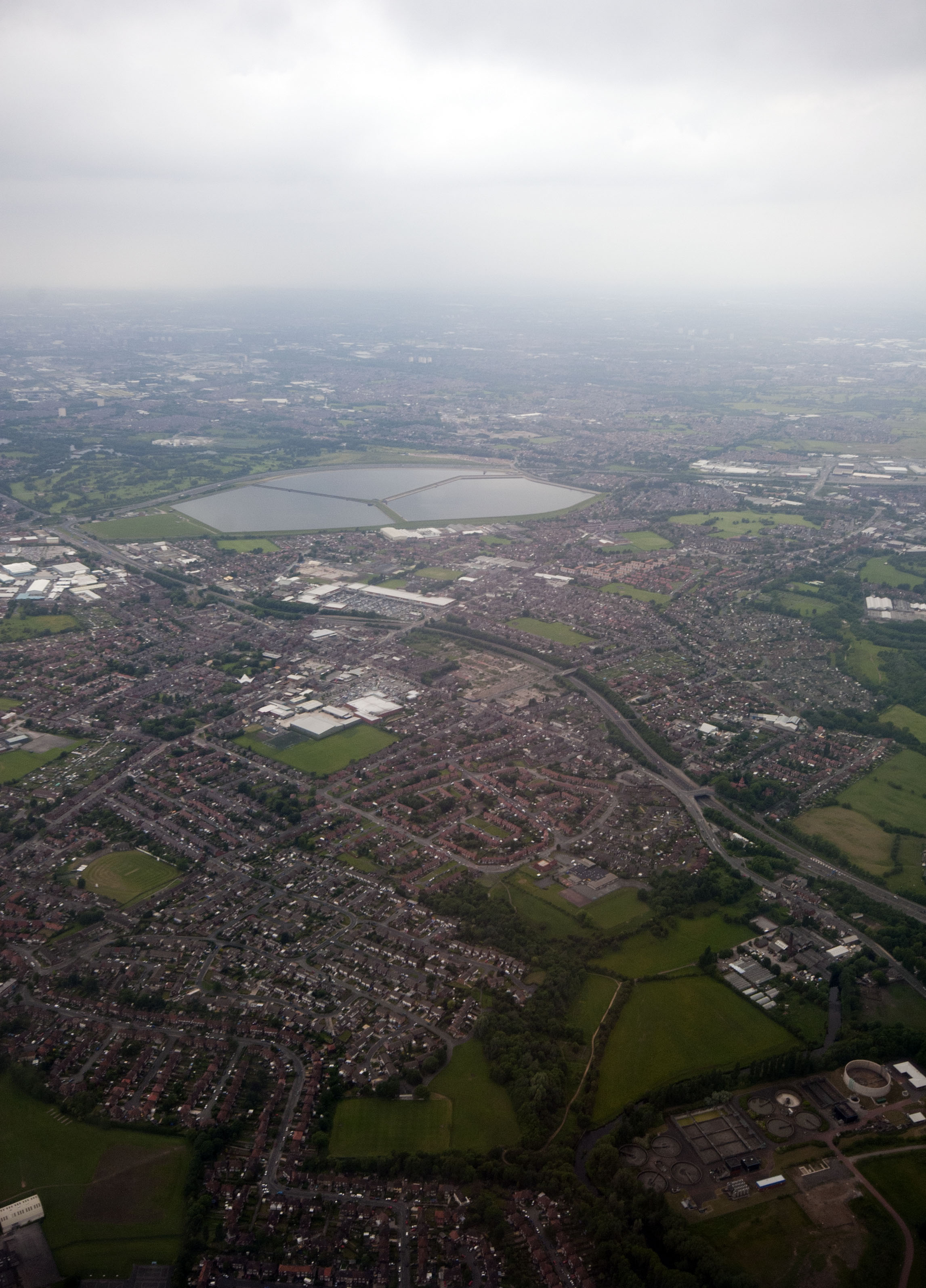
Viewed from the air, looking west

Denton is on the Lancashire coalfield and once had a number of collieries. These included the Ellis Colliery (which became Denton Colliery), Top Pit, Hard Mine Pit and, further south and near to the River Tame, Hulmes Pit. Much of the coal that they produced was consumed by local industry, there being an abundance of steam powered mills in the area.

Denton Colliery was the largest of these mines and eventually absorbed the other local pits, often using their shafts for ventilation or, in the case of Hulmes Pit, as a pumping station to drain water from the main workings. Denton Colliery was connected to the London & North Western Railway's line from Guide Bridge to Stockport by a standard gauge tramway. The tramway was worked by steam power, rather than horses, as evidenced by a photograph held in the Tameside Local History Library archives.

In 1926, miners at Denton Colliery joined the national strike against reduced wages and longer working hours. This dispute led to the General Strike (3–12 May 1926). When the General Strike was called off, coal miners stayed out for several more months.

As the strike started to crumble, miners at Denton Colliery remained steadfast, not returning to work until 5 November 1926, some 6 weeks and one day after their colleagues at the nearby Ashton Moss Colliery, the only other significant colliery left in Tameside at that time. They returned to face longer working hours and their pre-strike rates of pay.

Unfortunately, months without maintenance during the strike had taken their toll on many coal mines. Denton Colliery had flooded to the extent that it was no longer workable and the Denton Colliery Co. went into voluntary liquidation in 1929. The headstock was demolished in 1932 and the shaft was finally filled and capped in 1974.

Some traces of Denton Colliery can still be found. The colliery offices on Stockport Road still stand and are now the showroom of a company of monumental stonemasons. Behind the office building is a small section of wall from the colliery. On the opposite side of the road and slightly nearer to Crown Point is the building that once housed the local mines rescue station, now two private houses. Two miners' cottages, much altered and now converted into one house, stand near the junction of Stockport Road and Cemetery Road. The foundations of Hulmes Pit were excavated in the early 1970s and can still be seen. Parts of the track bed of the tramway to Denton Colliery can still be traced, both on modern maps and on the ground, as can traces of a canal, known as the Beat Bank Branch, intended to link local collieries to the Stockport branch of the Ashton Canal at Reddish, which was partially built and then abandoned.

=== Oldham Batteries ===
After hatting, the most important industry in Denton was the manufacture of lead-acid batteries by Oldham Batteries (Oldham & Son Ltd). In 1865, Joseph Oldham established a millwright general engineering shop and by 1887 this company was manufacturing machinery for the hat-making industry. Another important industry in the area was coal mining and shortly after 1887 the company began making machinery and equipment for this industry, which included miners' portable lamps. Up to this time, miners had always used the safety lamp devised in 1815 by Sir Humphry Davy (1778–1829) but this new battery-powered Davy lamp eventually replaced the traditional safety lamp.

In 1920, the manufacture of automotive batteries for commercial vehicles, cars and motorcycles commenced and over the years this business expanded into the manufacture of traction batteries, which also included submarine batteries.

Nonetheless, the company never converted exclusively to the manufacture of batteries and they still continued to make machinery for the hatting industry, general engineering equipment, portable lamps and lighting systems as well as helmet-lamps and other related equipment for the mining industry. It also produced attachments for the mechanical handling industry.

Oldham Batteries became a major Denton employer with over 1,000 employees, but by the beginning of 2002 the decision to close the factory had been made. The factory, which used to be off Lime Grove, Denton, is no longer there. It has been demolished, and a planning application for a further housing and a Wellness centre agreed, the latter of which was completed and opened in early 2020. The housing is still currently (as of 2022) being built. Both of these projects required considerable clean up of the ground, given the previous use and the associated lead and other chemical contamination.

== Governance ==
=== Civic history and councillors ===
Denton was originally one of the townships of the ancient parish of Manchester in the Salford Hundred of Lancashire. In 1866 it became a civil parish in its own right. The parish was expanded in 1894 by the inclusion of the Haughton township, the former area of which now covers the eastern part of the town. The name of Haughton survives as local place names at Haughton Green and Haughton Dale, both in south Denton. Clues to the former township do still exist at Haughton Street, Haughton Hall Road, the Parish Church of St. Anne, Haughton, and etched onto an ancient boundary marker on Broomstair Bridge on the A57 Hyde Road – (CHESHIRE Township of Hyde | Township of Haughton LANCASHIRE). Also in 1894 the enlarged parish became Denton Urban District in the administrative county of Lancashire.

In 1974, Denton's Urban District status was abolished and its assets and area were transferred to form part of the new Metropolitan Borough of Tameside in the metropolitan county of Greater Manchester.

Since 1974, Denton has consisted of three council wards on Tameside Council: Denton North East, Denton South and Denton West, each returning three councillors. The new wards took the same format as the original six Denton UDC wards (which were East, North, South-East, South, South-West and West). There have been minor ward boundary changes in 1982 and 2004. Denton West is the most Conservative-inclined of the three wards and, from 1975 to 1991, had Conservative party representation. No Conservative councillor has been elected since 1987 in the town, although the party came within 13 votes of regaining the Denton West seat in 2008. This was on the back of government unpopularity over the abolition of the 10p tax rate and the proposals for a congestion charge in Greater Manchester, with the proposed outer charging zone cutting the ward in two.

After the most recent local elections held in May 2026, the nine councillors for the town are:

Denton North East	Denton South	Denton West
Vincent Ricci	Jack Naylor	Mike Smith
Allison Gwynne	Audra Murray	Dan Bennett
Aron Webb	George Newton	George Jones

Since 1998, there has been a degree of devolution, with District Assemblies established in the Tameside townships and consisting of the councillors and an advisory group. Assembly meetings are open to the public. Each Assembly has a town manager and devolved staff and budgets to deal with local services such as grounds maintenance, road repairs, parks, Britain in Bloom, community events, youth services, crime and disorder and town centre regeneration. The Denton and Audenshaw District Assembly controls an annual budget in excess of £1.5m. The old council chamber in Denton Town Hall was refurbished to provide a permanent home and meeting place for the Denton and Audenshaw District Assembly as the town's millennium project in 2000.

Since its formation the District Assembly Chairs have been: Andrew Gwynne (1998–2001), Mike Craven (2001–2004), Allison Gwynne (2004–2005) and Margaret Downs (2005–present).

=== Twinning ===
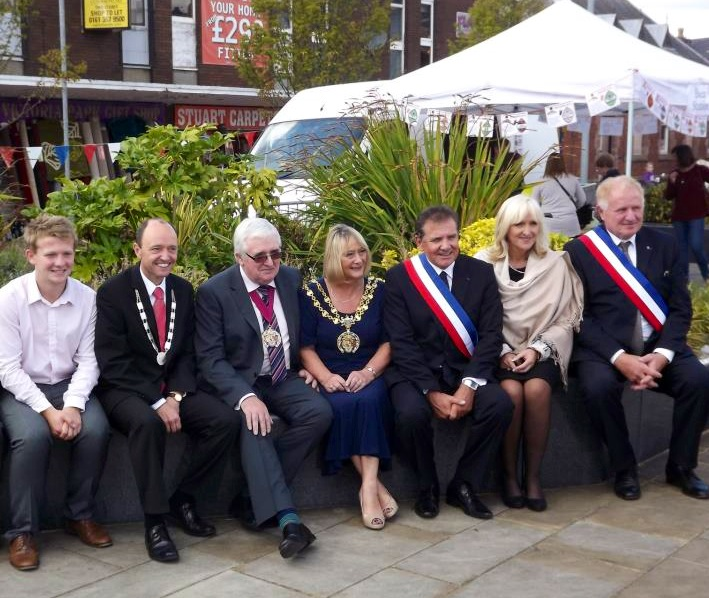
Chairman George Newton, Mayor of Kierspe, Mayoral Consort and Civic Mayor of Tameside Cllr Brenda Warrington, Mayor and Mayoress of Montigny, and Deputy Mayor of Montigny on Denton Town Twinning Day, 22 September 2012

On 5 December 1992, Denton became a twin-town to Montigny le Bretonneux, near Paris, France. On one side of the town hall, there is a 'French road sign' which was a gift from the Municipal Authority in Montigny and states how far it is to Montigny le Bretonneux from Denton. There is a similar 'English road sign' outside Montigny's Town Hall pointing to Denton. Denton celebrated 20 years of twinning in September 2012.

For ten years, the French sign on Denton Town Hall pointed north, implying that Denton's French twin-town is located in the sea somewhere to the west of Orkney. However, Tameside MBC installed a 'mock' French road sign, pointing left (i.e. south) in February 2007.

Since September 2012, Denton has been twinned with Kierspe in north-west Germany, near Cologne, which in itself has been twinned with Montigny for 25 years.

There is a similar road sign to Kierspe, displayed on the wall of the town hall building, that points in a southerly direction, indicating that it may be f9und it close to Le Mans in France, rather than Germany where Kierspe is currently located.

The town twinning is run independently of the local authority and is run by volunteers who sit on the Denton Town Twinning Association. The group fundraise and rely on generous donations to continue cultivating educational, cultural, and commercial links between Denton and its twin towns.

=== Parliamentary representation ===
The area of the former Denton urban district initially formed part of the Gorton Parliamentary Division of South East Lancashire from 1885 to 1918; it then became part of the Lancashire, Mossley Parliamentary Division from boundary changes effective in that year's election until 1950. From 1950 to 1955 the town was contained within the short-lived Droylsden constituency. From 1955 to 1983 Denton was regrouped with Gorton to form the Manchester, Gorton constituency. From the 1983 boundary changes until 2024, Denton formed part of the Denton and Reddish parliamentary constituency.

In 2024, the 2023 review of Westminster constituencies came into effect, with Denton joining Gorton, Longsite and Levenshulme to become the Gorton and Denton Constituency. Andrew Gwynne was Denton's MP until his resignation in 2026. He was elected in 2005 to represent the Denton and Reddish seat, after long-serving MP Andrew Bennett retired. He remained the MP for Denton as part of the new Denton and Gorton Constituency after the 2023 boundary changes. Since 2026 the MP for Gorton and Denton is Hannah Spencer

Members of Parliament representing Denton since 1885:

Election	Member	Party	Parliamentary constituency
1885	Richard Peacock	Liberal	S.E. Lancs., Gorton Division
1889 by-election	Sir William Mather	Liberal	S.E. Lancs., Gorton Division
1895	Ernest Frederic George Hatch	Conservative	S.E. Lancs., Gorton Division
1904	Ernest Frederic George Hatch	Liberal	S.E. Lancs., Gorton Division
1906	John Hodge	Labour	S.E. Lancs., Gorton Division
1918	Austin Hopkinson	Coalition Liberal	Lancs., Mossley Division
1922	Austin Hopkinson	Independent	Lancs., Mossley Division
1929	Herbert Gibson	Labour	Lancs., Mossley Division
1931	Austin Hopkinson	National Independent	Lancs., Mossley Division
1945	Rev. George Savile Woods	Labour Co-op	Lancs., Mossley Division
1950	Rev. George Savile Woods	Labour Co-op	Droylsden Borough
1951	William Richard Williams	Labour	Droylsden Borough
1955	Konni Zilliacus	Labour	Manchester, Gorton Borough
1967 by-election	Kenneth Marks	Labour	Manchester, Gorton Borough
1983	Andrew Bennett	Labour	Denton and Reddish Borough
2005	Andrew Gwynne	Labour	Denton and Reddish Borough
2024	Andrew Gwynne	Labour	Gorton and Denton Borough
2026 by-election	Hannah Spencer	Green	Gorton and Denton Borough

== Landmarks ==
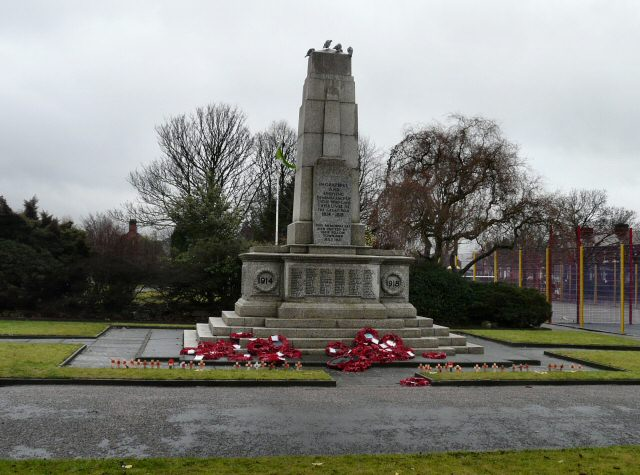
Denton War Memorial

There is one main war memorial, or cenotaph, in Denton, located in Victoria Park. This commemorates people from Denton and Haughton who served in the two World Wars. The names on the war memorial were collected from their relatives who wrote to the council with details of their loved ones who served in either war. The war memorial was unveiled on 23 July 1921. Figures from the Denton section of the Tameside council website, state that 3,500 Denton men served in the Great War (1914–1918), of that number, 369 people were killed.

The oldest church in Denton is St. Lawrence's. It is almost 500 years old, originally built in 1531. It is a listed Grade II* building. The church is also known locally as "Th'owd Peg" (the old peg) due to the fact, as a timber-framed building, it was constructed with wooden pegs rather than nails. It is more commonly known as the black and white church, because of its appearance. A local myth is also said to have a pirate buried within its grounds because of a grave stone marked with a skull and crossbones at its front door. In a more thorough investigation and article printed by Denton Local History Society (1995), it was found that the gravestone was actually a masonic gravestone belonging to a deceased Soldier named Samuel Bromley from the Royal Artillery.

The Victorian St Anne's Church, Haughton, is a Grade I listed building, and is built in the Gothic Revival style.

== Transport ==
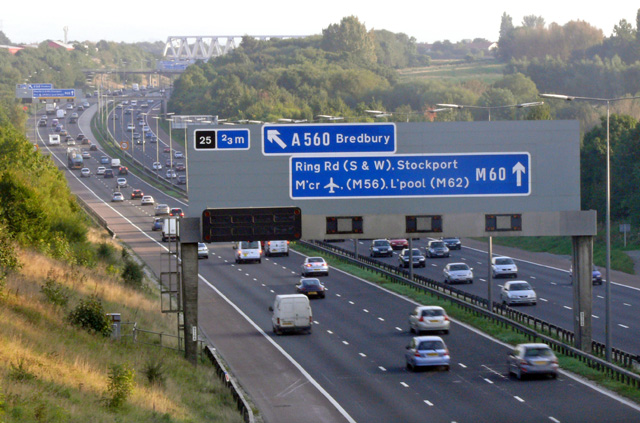
The M60 at Denton, approaching Bredbury

The town is served by Denton railway station on the Stockport-Stalybridge Line. There is a threadbare service; Northern Trains operates only two passenger trains per week that stop here on Saturday mornings; these are known as parliamentary trains. The line is used regularly by goods and charter trains.

The area's bus services are provided by Stagecoach Manchester and Metroline Manchester, which operate the following routes:

- 201: between Hattersley and Manchester city centre, via Gorton
- 202: between Gee Cross and Manchester city centre, via Hyde, Haughton Green and Gorton
- 322: between Haughton Green and Stockport, via Brinnington and Portwood
- 324: between Stockport and Haughton Green, via Portwood and Brinnington
- 327: to Stockport, via Brinnington and Portwood
- 335: to Ashton-under-Lyne, via Dukinfield
- 345: to Ashton-under-Lyne, via Dukinfield and Audenshaw
- 347: between Ashton-under-Lyne and Haughton Green, via Guide Bridge and Audenshaw.

The M67 Denton Relief Road motorway was constructed between 1978 and 1981, running east to west through Denton; originally, this was planned to be part of a motorway running from central Manchester to Sheffield. At Denton Island, junction 1 of the M67 connects with junction 24 of the Manchester Ring Road.

== Education ==
=== Primary schools ===
- Corrie Primary and Nursery School
- Denton West End Primary School
- Greswell Primary School
- Linden Road Primary School
- Manor Green Primary and Nursery School
- Russell Scott Primary School
- St Anne's Primary School
- St John Fisher RC Primary School
- St Mary's RC Primary School

=== Secondary schools ===
- Denton Community college (formerly Egerton Park Arts College and Two Trees Sports College)
- St Thomas More RC College

== Sport ==
=== Cricket ===
Denton is home to three semi-professional cricket clubs, all of which play in the Greater Manchester Cricket League.

Denton CC play at Egerton Street. They were league champions in 1994 and 1995 and runners up in 1998; their previous professionals include West Indies players Malcolm Marshall and Kenneth Benjamin.

Denton West CC, known as Reddish & Gorton CC until 1947, play at Windsor Park in the Dane Bank area of Denton. Denton West had a long history of Sri Lankan professionals including the first, Test Player Tony Opatha, in 1976. They were league champions in 1996, 1997, 2002, 2003, 2009, 2010 and 2013, and Walkden Cup winners in 1975, 1998, 2009, 2012 and 2014.

Denton St Lawrence CC play at Sycamore Park and their 2005 professional was West Indian Ryan Nurse. In July 2005, they won the Walkden Cup for the first time in 30 years defeating Flowery Field Cricket Club.

=== Football ===
Denton Town FC currently play in the Cheshire Football League Division One, after winning the Division Two championship in 2011. The club was formed in 1920 as Bradford Parish and was a force in local non-league football for many years before relocating with a change of name in the mid-1990s; their ground is now on the Whittles Park Estate in south-east Denton.

== Notable people ==
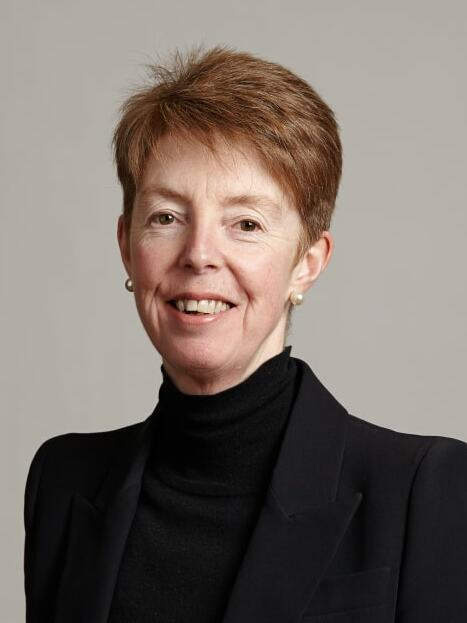
Paula Vennells, 2016

- Richard Greswell (1800–1881), teacher, re-founded the National Society for Promoting Religious Education.
- Thomas Mallalieu (c.1858–1935), trade unionist, general secretary, the Felt Hatters' and Trimmers' Unions of GB
- Fred Worthington (ca1891–1973), trade union general secretary of the Felt Hatters' and Trimmers' Unions of GB
- Paula Vennells (born 1959), former businesswoman, the chief executive of Post Office Limited from 2012 to 2019
- Mick Hucknall (born 1960), lead singer of Simply Red
- Reni (born 1964), drummer with The Stone Roses, full name, Alan John Wren
- Col Needham (born 1967), creator and CEO of the IMDb (Internet Movie Database), 1990 to 2025
- Andrew Gwynne (born 1974), politician, MP for Gorton and Denton, previously Denton and Reddish, since 2005
- Stephen Bailey (born 1986), stand-up comedian and TV presenter
- Brooke Vincent (born 1992), actress, played Sophie Webster in Coronation Street, from 2004 to 2019.

=== Sport ===
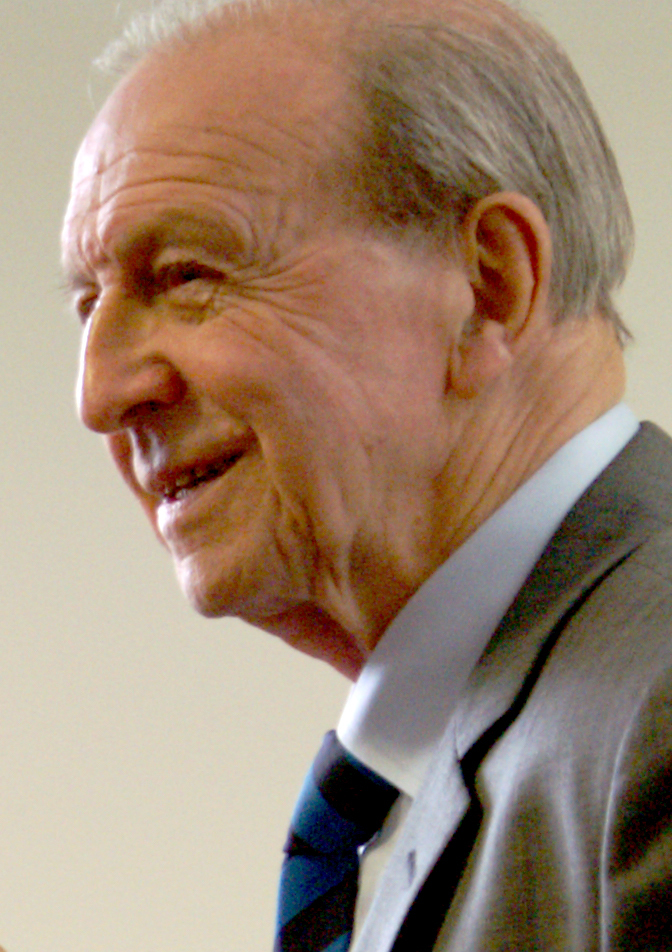
Jimmy Armfield, 2012

- Jimmy Armfield (1935–2018), footballer, played 569 games for Blackpool and 43 for England, freeman of the Borough of Blackpool
- Steve Massey (born 1958), football manager and former player who played 384 games beginning with 101 for Stockport County
- Paul Lake (born 1968), footballer who played 110 games for Manchester City
- Colin Haughton (born 1972), badminton singles player, reached 19th in the world rankings.
- Carl Alford (born 1972), footballer who played over 290 league games
- Zach Clough (born 1995), footballer who played 220 games, beginning with 68 with Bolton Wanderers

== See also ==
- Listed buildings in Denton, Greater Manchester
