= Hale (2023 Trafford ward) =

Electoral ward of Trafford, in Greater Manchester, England

- Electoral ward for the Trafford Council
- Hale ward ward boundaries since 2023
- Borough: Trafford
- County: Greater Manchester
- Population: 11,211 (2021) (Note: 2021 Census data reported for 2023 ward boundaries)
- Electorate: 7,849 (2025)
- Major settlements: Hale
- Area: 3.49 square kilometres (1.35 sq mi)

Current electoral ward
- Created: 2023
- Number of members: 3
- Councillors: Jane Leicester; Rupert Kelly; Natalie Shalom
- Created from: Altrincham; Hale Barns; Hale Central
- GSS code: E05015248

Hale is an electoral ward in Trafford, Greater Manchester, covering Hale. It was created in 2023 following changes to the boundaries of the electoral wards. It returns councillors to Trafford Council.

== Councillors ==
The councillors are Jane Leicester (Green), Hannah Spencer (Green), and Natalie Shalom (Conservative).

| Election | Councillor | Councillor | Councillor |
|---|---|---|---|
| 2023 | Jane Leicester (Green) | Hannah Spencer (Green) | Owain Sutton (Green) |
| 2024 | Jane Leicester (Green) | Hannah Spencer (Green) | Owain Sutton (Green) |
| November 2025 | Jane Leicester (Green) | Hannah Spencer (Green) | Natalie Shalom (Con) |
| 2026 | Jane Leicester (Green) | Rupert Kelly (Con) | Natalie Shalom (Con) |

indicates seat up for re-election.

== Elections in the 2020s ==
=== May 2026 ===
2026
| Party | Candidate | Votes | % | ±% |
|---|---|---|---|---|
| Conservative | Rupert Kelly | 1,941 | 45.2 | +8.7 |
| Green | Orla Weir | 1,571 | 36.6 | −10.7 |
| Reform | Richard Shean | 346 | 8.1 | N/A |
| Labour | Seth Champion | 271 | 6.3 | −5.5 |
| Liberal Democrats | Jason Stack | 162 | 3.8 | +0.2 |
| Majority | | 370 | 8.6 | |
| Rejected ballots | | 6 | 0.1 | -0.6 |
| Turnout | | 4,297 | 54.2 | +6.8 |
| Registered electors | | 7,928 | | |
| Conservative gain from Green | | Swing | +9.7 | |

=== November 2025 (by-election) ===
By-election 20 November 2025
| Party | Candidate | Votes | % | ±% |
|---|---|---|---|---|
| Conservative | Natalie Shalom | 1,521 | 46.5 | +10.0 |
| Green | Orla Weir | 1,245 | 38.1 | −9.2 |
| Reform | Phil Holt | 264 | 8.1 | +8.1 |
| Labour | Clare Sheridan | 138 | 4.2 | −7.6 |
| Liberal Democrats | Jason Stack | 101 | 3.1 | −0.5 |
| Majority | | 276 | 8.4 | |
| Rejected ballots | | 2 | 0.1 | -0.6 |
| Turnout | | 3,271 | 41.7 | −5.7 |
| Registered electors | | 7,849 | | |
| Conservative gain from Green | | Swing | ▲9.6 | |

=== May 2024 ===
2024
| Party | Candidate | Votes | % | ±% |
|---|---|---|---|---|
| Green | Owain Sutton* | 1,751 | 47.3 | −2.8 |
| Conservative | Natalie Shalom | 1,351 | 36.5 | −1.3 |
| Labour | Josh Spindler | 436 | 11.8 | +1.4 |
| Liberal Democrats | Jason Stack | 135 | 3.6 | −2.3 |
| Majority | | 400 | 10.8 | +7.2 |
| Rejected ballots | | 27 | 0.7 | -0.8 |
| Turnout | | 3,700 | 47.4 | +1.8 |
| Registered electors | | 7,814 | | |
| Green hold | | Swing | -0.8 | |

=== May 2023 ===
2023 (3)
| Party | Candidate | Votes | % | ±% |
|---|---|---|---|---|
| Green | Jane Leicester* | 1,798 | 51.1% | |
| Green | Hannah Spencer | 1,521 | 43.2% | |
| Green | Owain Sutton | 1,458 | 41.4% | |
| Conservative | Daniel Chalkin* | 1,329 | 37.8% | |
| Conservative | Sue Carroll | 1,309 | 37.2% | |
| Conservative | Anand Chinthala | 1,188 | 33.8% | |
| Labour | Michael Jarkowski | 366 | 10.4% | |
| Labour | Chris Millson | 349 | 9.9% | |
| Labour | Mark Nesbitt | 312 | 8.9% | |
| Liberal Democrats | Maggie Boysen | 207 | 5.9% | |
| Liberal Democrats | Donald McIntosh | 146 | 4.2% | |
| Liberal Democrats | Richard Pollard | 124 | 3.5% | |
| Majority | | | | |
| Rejected ballots | | 54 | 1.5% | |
| Turnout | | 3,518 | 45.6% | |
| Registered electors | | 7,707 | | |
