= 14–19 Diploma =

British educational qualification

The 14-19 Diploma was a composite qualification in England launched in September 2008. Its development was announced in the 14–19 Education and Skills White Paper of March 2005. It was available to learners between the ages of 14 and 19, crossing the divide between general education and vocational education. It was closed by the Department for Education in August 2013, and is no longer offered to students.

== Diploma lines of learning, levels, and qualification structure ==
Diplomas were available in a range of 14 industry/employment sectors. These were known as lines of learning (rather than subjects). These include Engineering, Creative and Media and Travel and Tourism. Diplomas were not intended as preparation for direct entry into a profession, but as a general education as well as an introduction to an industry sector from which a student might progress, either through further study in full-time education, or training.

All 14 lines of learning were available at levels 1, 2 and 3 of the National Qualifications Framework. At level 1, the Diploma was known as a Foundation Diploma and was roughly equivalent in terms of challenge and volume of study to 5 GCSE qualifications at grades D - G. At level 2, the Diploma is known as a Higher Diploma which is comparable in terms of challenge and volume of study to 7 A* - C grades at GCSE. At level 3, two sizes of Diploma were available. The Advanced Diploma was comparable in challenge and volume of study to 3.5 A-levels, whereas the Progression Diploma, involved a smaller volume of study, approximated to 2.5 A-levels.

Most Diplomas had three main components: principal learning, generic learning and additional and specialist learning. Principal learning was a single qualification, based on the chosen line of learning. This qualification made up the greatest proportion of the Diploma. Generic learning included a number of sub-components: functional skills qualifications in English, Mathematics and ICT; a project qualification; a minimum of 10 days work experience and achievement of six personal, learning and thinking skills (PLTS). The additional and specialist learning component permitted the student to choose to include one or more qualifications in their Diploma. These qualifications may, but do not have to, relate to the line of learning. The Progression Diploma did not include the additional and specialist learning component.

== UCAS ==
Although UCAS tariff points were agreed for the advanced diplomas, many universities didn't accept the qualification for entry to further study. This led to the ultimate demise of the qualification.
