= Warrington (surname) =

Surname List

This is a list of people with the surname, Warrington.

== A ==
- Andrew Clifford Warrington (born 10 June 1976) English professional footballer
- Alfred C. Warrington, (born 1935) American accountant and business executive
- Alicia Warrington (born 30 August 1980), American drummer and ring announcer

== B ==
- Bill Warrington (1910-1981), American special effects artist
- Bill Warrington, character in All Creatures Great and Small
- Brenda Warrington, British Labour politician and former leader of Tameside Metropolitan Borough Council

== C ==
- Charles Warrington (born 28 May 1971), American professional wrestler

== D ==
- Darcy Warrington, Canadian politician
- Don Warrington, Trinidadian-born British actor
- Don Warrington (Canadian Football), (7 June 1948 – 4 December 1980), Canadian football player

== E ==
- Elizabeth Kerr Warrington FRS (born 1931), British neurologist

== F ==
- Freda Warrington, British author

== G ==
- George David Warrington (19 September 1952 – 24 December 2007), American businessman

== I ==
- Ian Warrington, New Zealand Scientist

== J ==
- John Warrington (cricketer) (born 1948), New Zealand cricketer
- John Warrington (producer) (born 1962), British television producer
- Josh Warrington (born 14 November 1990), British boxer
- John Michael Warrington (1924-2010) was an English cricketer
- John Wesley Warrington (1844-1921), American judge

== L ==
- Lisa Jadwiga Valentina Warrington (born 1952), British-born Kiwi, Academic, director, author
- Lewis Wesley Warrington (born 10 October 2002), English footballer
- Lewis Warrington, (3 November 1782 – 12 October 1851), American Naval Officer and United States Secretary of the Navy
- Lewis Warrington (Medal of Honor), (unknown – 5 January 1879), United States Army Medal of Honor recipient

== P ==
- Percy Ewart Warrington (1889–1961) educationist and evangelical Church of England clergyman

== S ==
- Sara Warrington, Soap opera character

== T ==
- Thomas Rolls Warrington, 1st Baron Warrington of Clyffe, (29 May 1851 – 26 October 1937), Member of the Privy Council of the United Kingdom
- Tony Warrington, (born 28 March 1947), English cricketer
- Tex Warrington, (21 March 1921 – 21 September 1993) professional American football player

== W ==
- William Warrington (1796-1869), British maker of stained glass windows.
