= Dukinfield / Stalybridge =

Dukinfield / Stalybridge (Tameside)
- Electoral ward
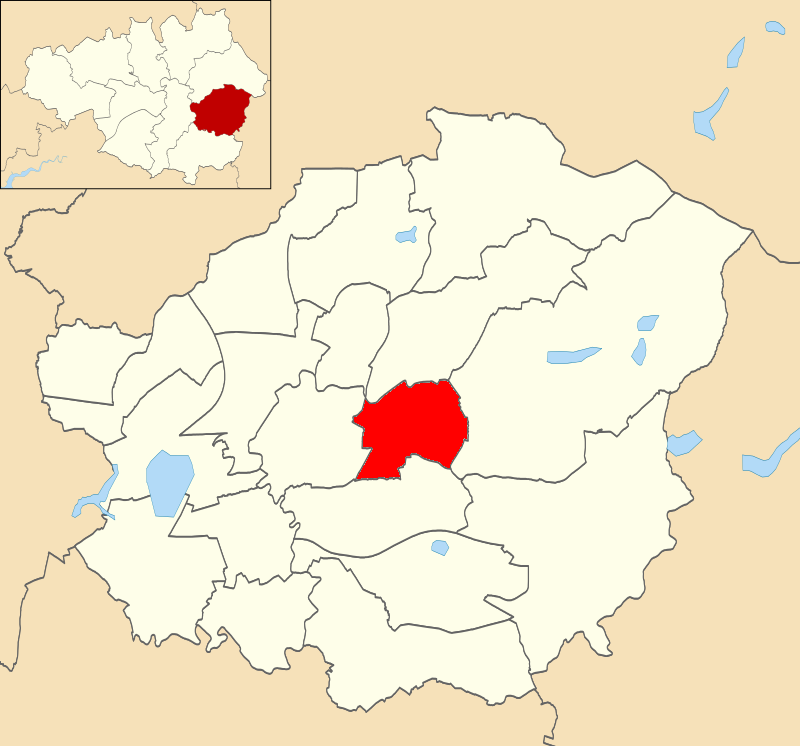
- Dukinfield / Stalybridge within Tameside

- Coat of arms
- Motto: Industry and Integrity
- Interactive map of Dukinfield / Stalybridge (Tameside)
- Coordinates: 53.4754°N 2.0616°W
- Country: United Kingdom
- Constituent country: England
- Region: North West England
- County: Greater Manchester
- Metropolitan borough: Tameside
- Created: 2004
- Named after: Stalybridge and Hyde

Government UK Parliament constituency: Stalybridge and Hyde
  - Type: Unicameral
  - Body: Tameside Metropolitan Borough Council
  - Leader of the Council: Brenda Warrington (Labour)
  - Councillor: Eleanor Wills (Labour)
  - Councillor: David Sweeton (Labour)
  - Councillor: Leanne Feeley (Labour)

Dukinfield / Stalybridge is an electoral ward of Tameside, England. It is represented in Westminster by Jonathan Reynolds Labour Co-operative MP for Stalybridge and Hyde.

== Councillors ==
The ward is represented by three councillors: Eleanor Wills (Lab), David Sweeton (Lab), and Leanne Feeley (Lab).

Election	Councillor	Councillor	Councillor
2004	Charles Meredith (Lab)	David Sweeton (Lab)	Philip Wilkinson (Lab)
2006	Mary Eileen (Lab)	David Sweeton (Lab)	Philip Wilkinson (Lab)
2007	Mary Eileen (Lab)	David Sweeton (Lab)	Philip Wilkinson (Lab)
2008	Mary Eileen (Lab)	David Sweeton (Lab)	Dorothy Cartwright (Con)
2010	Eileen Shorrock (Lab)	David Sweeton (Lab)	Dorothy Cartwright (Con)
December 2010	Eileen Shorrock (Lab)	David Sweeton (Lab)	Dorothy Cartwright (Lab)
2011	Eileen Shorrock (Lab)	David Sweeton (Lab)	Dorothy Cartwright (Lab)
2012	Eileen Shorrock (Lab)	David Sweeton (Lab)	Claire Reynolds (Lab)
2014	Eleanor Ballagher (Lab)	David Sweeton (Lab)	Claire Reynolds (Lab)
2015	Eleanor Ballagher (Lab)	David Sweeton (Lab)	Claire Reynolds (Lab)
2016	Eleanor Ballagher (Lab)	David Sweeton (Lab)	Leanne Feeley (Lab)
2018	Eleanor Wills (née Ballagher) (Lab)	David Sweeton (Lab)	Leanne Feeley (Lab)

indicates seat up for re-election. indicates a defection from the Conservative Party to the Labour Party.

== Elections in 2010s ==
=== May 2018 ===
2018
Party	Candidate	Votes	%	±%
Labour	Eleanor Wills*	1,146		
Conservative	Les Browning	622		
Your Town, Our Town, Stalybridge Town	Dave Tate	696		
Green	Linda Freeman	132		
Turnout		2,605	29.5	
Labour hold		Swing		

=== May 2016 ===
2016
Party	Candidate	Votes	%	±%
Labour	Leanne Feeley	1,548	57.44	
UKIP	David Anderson	772	28.65	
Independent	Chris Caton-Greasley	375	13.91	
Majority		776	28.79	
Turnout		2,695	32	
Labour hold		Swing		

=== May 2015 ===
2015
Party	Candidate	Votes	%	±%
Labour	David Sweeton	2,720	54.50	
UKIP	Wayne Jones	1,821	36.49	
Green	Mo Ramzan	450	9.02	
Majority		899	18.01	
Turnout		4,991	58	
Labour hold		Swing		

=== May 2014 ===
2014
Party	Candidate	Votes	%	±%
Labour	Eleanor Ballagher	1,194	40.89	
UKIP	Wayne Jones	954	32.67	
Conservative	Christine Liley	507	17.36	
Green	Emily Kelly	206	7.05	
Independent	Steve Starlord	59	2.02	
Majority		240	8.22	
Turnout		2,920	33	
Labour gain from Conservative		Swing		

=== May 2012 ===
2012
Party	Candidate	Votes	%	±%
Labour	Claire Reynolds	1,528	55.75	+20.65
Conservative	Amanda Buckley	483	17.62	−26.61
English Democrat	Gregory Shorrock	364	13.28	N/A
UKIP	Lyn Misell	211	7.70	N/A
Green	Michael Fowler	155	5.65	−2.45
Majority		1,045	38.12	
Turnout		2,748	31.4	−2.6
Labour hold		Swing		

=== May 2011 ===
2011
Party	Candidate	Votes	%	±%
Labour	David Sweeton	1,703	54.76	
Conservative	Amanda Buckley	888	28.55	
BNP	Gregory Shorrock	192	6.17	
Green	Michael Smee	170	5.47	
UKIP	Jacqueline Misell	157	5.05	
Majority		815	26.21	
Turnout		3,110	36	
Labour hold		Swing		

=== May 2010 ===
2010
Party	Candidate	Votes	%	±%
Labour	Eileen Shorrock	2,304	44.84	
Conservative	Amanda Buckley	1,762	34.29	
BNP	Gregory Shorrock	549	10.69	
UKIP	Jacqueline Misell	277	5.39	
Green	Michael Smee	246	4.79	
Majority		542	10.55	
Turnout		5,138	60	
Labour hold		Swing		

== Elections in 2000s ==
=== May 2008 ===
2008
Party	Candidate	Votes	%	±%
Conservative	Dorothy Cartwright	1,288	44.23	
Labour	Michael Ballagher	1,022	35.10	
BNP	Jeffrey Clayton	366	12.57	
Green	Michael Smee	236	8.10	
Majority		266	9.13	
Turnout		2,912	34	
Labour gain from Conservative		Swing		

=== May 2007 ===
2007
Party	Candidate	Votes	%	±%
Labour	David Jonathon Sweeton	1,299	44.9	
Conservative	Brian Eric Dean	1,039	35.9	
UKIP	Paul Kidd	283	9.8	
Green	Michael Smee	272	9.4	
Majority		260	9.0	
Turnout		2,893	34.3	
Labour hold		Swing		

=== May 2006 ===
2006
Party	Candidate	Votes	%	±%
Labour	Mary Eileen	1,271	50.62	
Conservative	Michael Dickinson	1,240	49.38	
Majority		31	1.23	
Turnout		2,511	30	
Labour hold		Swing		

=== June 2004 ===
2004
Party	Candidate	Votes	%	±%
Labour	Charles Meredith	1,628	45.3	
Labour	David Sweeton	1,598		
Labour	Philip Wilkinson	1,478		
Conservative	Philip Barker	1,160	32.3	
Conservative	Suzanne Barker	1,123		
Conservative	Andrew Hollingworth	1,081		
Green	Martine Marshall	806	22.4	
Majority				
Turnout			39.4	
