= 2024 Tameside Metropolitan Borough Council election =

2024 local government election in Tameside

- 2 May 2024

19 out of 57 seats on Tameside Metropolitan Borough Council 29 seats needed for a majority

	First party	Second party	Third party
Leader	Gerald Cooney	Doreen Dickinson	N/A
Party	Labour	Conservative	Independent
Seats before	51	6	0
Seats won	14	3	2
Seats after	48	7	2
Seat change	▼3	▲1	▲2
Popular vote	25,622	9,989	3,938
Percentage	52.1%	20.3%	8.0%
Swing	▼11.3%	▼3.4%	▲6.2%
- Winner of each seat at the 2024 Tameside Metropolitan Borough Council election
Leader before election
Gerald Cooney
Labour
Leader after election
Gerald Cooney
Labour

The 2024 Tameside Metropolitan Borough Council elections were held on 2 May 2024 alongside other local elections in the United Kingdom. One third of the 57 seats on the Tameside Metropolitan Borough Council was contested, with each successful candidate serving a four-year term of office, expiring in 2028. Labour retained their majority on the council.

== Background ==
Since its creation in 1974, Tameside has always been under Labour control, aside from 1978 to 1982 when the Conservatives held a majority. The previous election in 2023, which took place following boundary changes and thus required all 57 seats to be contested, saw Labour increase its majority by three seats at the expense of two Conservative seats and the sole seat of the Green Party on the council.

=== Previous council composition ===
After 2023 election		Before 2024 election		After 2024 election	
Party	Seats	Party	Seats	Party	Seats
Labour	51	Labour	51	Labour	48
Conservative	6	Conservative	6	Conservative	7
Independent	0	Independent	0	Independent	2

== Summary ==
Labour had 51 of the council's 57 seats prior to the election. They lost three seats at this election, but were still left with a large majority of the seats.

=== Election result ===
Tameside Metropolitan Borough Council composition following the 2024 local elections

2024 Tameside Metropolitan Borough Council election
Party	This election				Full council			This election		
Party	Candidates	Seats	Net	Seats %	Other	Total	Total %	Votes	Votes %	+/−
Labour	{{{candidates}}}	14	▼3	73.7	34	48	84.2	25,622	52.1	–11.3
Conservative	{{{candidates}}}	3	▲1	15.8	4	7	12.3	9,989	20.3	–3.4
Independent	{{{candidates}}}	2	▲2	10.5	0	2	3.5	3,938	8.0	+6.2
Green	{{{candidates}}}	0	Steady	0.0	0	0	0.0	8,659	17.6	+8.0
Liberal Democrats	{{{candidates}}}	0	Steady	0.0	0	0	0.0	729	1.5	+0.7
Workers Party	{{{candidates}}}	0	Steady	0.0	0	0	0.0	272	0.6	N/A

== Ward results ==
The statement of persons nominated was released on 8 April 2024. Asterisk denotes incumbent.

=== Ashton Hurst ===
Ashton Hurst
Party	Candidate	Votes	%	±%
Labour	Mohammed Shamsul Karim*	1,171	43.8	+1.5
Conservative	Roy Thomas Miller	969	36.3	–3.6
Green	Hilary Veronica Jones	531	19.9	+2.1
Majority		202	7.5	N/A
Turnout		2,698	31.3	+0.4
Rejected ballots		17		
Registered electors		8,608		
Labour hold		Swing	▲2.6	

=== Ashton St Michael's ===
Ashton St Michael's
Party	Candidate	Votes	%	±%
Labour	Jean Drennan*	1,141	43.1	–5.3
Independent	Aaisha Ajmal	852	32.2	N/A
Conservative	Kevin Berry	416	15.7	–4.7
Liberal Democrats	John Bartley	203	7.7	–6.0
Majority		289	10.9	N/A
Turnout		2,645	28.9	+4.8
Rejected ballots		33		
Registered electors		9,158		
Labour hold				

=== Ashton Waterloo ===
Ashton Waterloo
Party	Candidate	Votes	%	±%
Labour	Sangita Patel*	1,390	52.4	+0.7
Green	Lee Alan Huntbach	1,261	47.6	+14.4
Majority		129	4.8	N/A
Turnout		2,733	29.7	+1.2
Rejected ballots		82		
Registered electors		9,209		
Labour hold		Swing	▼6.9	

=== Audenshaw ===
Audenshaw
Party	Candidate	Votes	%	±%
Labour	Teresa Ann Smith*	1,640	56.9	+9.6
Green	Glenn Curtis Piper	1,109	38.5	+24.7
Majority		531	18.4	N/A
Turnout		2,882	29.7	+0.4
Rejected ballots		133		
Registered electors		9,699		
Labour hold		Swing	▼7.6	

=== Denton North East ===
Denton North East
Party	Candidate	Votes	%	±%
Labour	Vincent Ricci*	1,403	64.8	+9.4
Green	John Bradley	678	31.3	+15.6
Majority		725	33.5	N/A
Turnout		2,165	25.1	+0.9
Rejected ballots		84		
Registered electors		8,623		
Labour hold		Swing	▼3.1	

=== Denton South ===
Denton South
Party	Candidate	Votes	%	±%
Labour	Jack Jeremy Naylor*	1,619	67.2	+13.9
Conservative	Hayley Woodcock	479	19.9	–3.6
Green	Chris Parr	276	11.5	–1.5
Majority		1,140	47.3	N/A
Turnout		2,409	27.9	+0.2
Rejected ballots		35		
Registered electors		8,646		
Labour hold		Swing	▲8.8	

=== Denton West ===
Denton West
Party	Candidate	Votes	%	±%
Labour	Mike Smith*	1,943	66.2	+4.2
Conservative	Clive Patrick	532	18.1	–1.4
Green	Keith Whitehead	407	13.9	–2.9
Majority		1,411	48.1	N/A
Turnout		2,937	32.4	+1.5
Rejected ballots		55		
Registered electors		9,057		
Labour hold		Swing	▲2.8	

=== Droylsden East ===
Droylsden East
Party	Candidate	Votes	%	±%
Labour	Laura Maria Boyle*	1,352	57.3	+14.3
Conservative	Melissa Mooney	433	18.4	–3.9
Green	Lorraine Ann Whitehead	290	12.3	–6.1
Liberal Democrats	Rowan Edward Fitton	242	10.3	–4.3
Majority		919	38.9	N/A
Turnout		2,359	27.4	+2.8
Rejected ballots		42		
Registered electors		8,622		
Labour hold		Swing	▲9.1	

=== Droylsden West ===
Droylsden West
Party	Candidate	Votes	%	±%
Labour	Barrie Holland*	1,428	60.3	+5.3
Conservative	David Dawson	444	18.8	–2.4
Green	Luke Nicholas Robinson	440	18.6	–2.9
Majority		984	41.5	N/A
Turnout		2,367	27.6	+3.3
Rejected ballots		55		
Registered electors		8,574		
Labour hold		Swing	▲3.9	

=== Dukinfield ===
Dukinfield
Party	Candidate	Votes	%	±%
Labour	Naila Sharif*	1,341	60.4	+11.1
Green	Zebedee Jack Powell	780	35.1	+13.6
Majority		561	25.3	N/A
Turnout		2,221	24.3	+1.6
Rejected ballots		100		
Registered electors		9,136		
Labour hold		Swing	▼1.3	

=== Dukinfield Stalybridge ===
Dukinfield Stalybridge
Party	Candidate	Votes	%	±%
Labour	Eleanor Wills*	1,205	46.8	+1.1
Conservative	Malcolm Smith	835	32.4	–4.3
Green	Ben Hart	483	18.8	+3.2
Majority		370	14.4	N/A
Turnout		2,574	29.2	–0.6
Rejected ballots		51		
Registered electors		8,810		
Labour hold		Swing	▲2.7	

=== Hyde Godley ===
Hyde Godley
Party	Candidate	Votes	%	±%
Conservative	Andrea Alyson Jane Colbourne*	1,242	43.7	+2.8
Labour	Francesca Coates	1,069	37.6	–8.3
Green	Emma Powell	497	17.5	+5.5
Majority		173	6.1	N/A
Turnout		2,841	32.8	+2.0
Rejected ballots		33		
Registered electors		8,656		
Conservative hold		Swing	▲5.6	

=== Hyde Newton ===
Hyde Newton
Party	Candidate	Votes	%	±%
Labour Co-op	Hugh William Roderick*	1,146	52.1	+4.8
Conservative	Andrew Moss	476	21.6	±0.0
Liberal Democrats	Peter Stanley Ball-Foster	284	12.9	–2.4
Workers Party	Audel Shirin	272	12.4	N/A
Majority		670	30.5	N/A
Turnout		2,200	24.3	+2.0
Rejected ballots		22		
Registered electors		9,050		
Labour hold		Swing	▲2.4	

=== Hyde Werneth ===
Hyde Werneth
Party	Candidate	Votes	%	±%
Conservative	Christopher James Halligan	1,292	38.0	–6.4
Labour Co-op	Jim Fitzpatrick*	1,167	34.3	–8.5
Green	Alex Cooper	608	17.9	+5.4
Independent	Phil Fitzpatrick	320	9.4	N/A
Turnout		3,404	36.4	–1.7
Majority		125	3.7	N/A
Rejected ballots		17		
Registered electors		9,364		
Conservative gain from Labour		Swing	▲1.1	

=== Longdendale ===
Longdendale
Party	Candidate	Votes	%	±%
Labour	Jacqueline Clair Owen*	1,538	59.4	+6.4
Conservative	Kieron Willd	588	22.7	+0.9
Green	Trevor Clarke	429	16.6	–7.4
Majority		950	36.7	N/A
Turnout		2,589	26.7	+2.2
Rejected ballots		34		
Registered electors		9,702		
Labour hold		Swing	▲2.8	

=== Mossley ===
Mossley
Party	Candidate	Votes	%	±%
Labour	Stephen Anthony Homer*	1,713	62.0	+25.7
Conservative	Callum Percival	530	19.2	+4.4
Green	Sarah Joanne Whiteley	479	17.3	–0.6
Majority		1,183	42.8	N/A
Turnout		2,763	31.8	+1.7
Rejected ballots		41		
Registered electors		8,698		
Labour hold		Swing	▲10.7	

=== St Peter's ===
St Peter's
Party	Candidate	Votes	%	±%
Independent	Kaleel Khan	1,596	56.1	+38.0
Labour	David McNally*	1,248	43.9	–7.4
Majority		348	12.2	N/A
Turnout		2,925	31.6	+5.9
Rejected ballots		81		
Registered electors		9,260		
Independent gain from Labour		Swing	▲22.7	

=== Stalybridge North ===
Stalybridge North
Party	Candidate	Votes	%	±%
Independent	Steven Barton	1,170	44.7	+16.0
Labour Co-op	Jan Jackson*	1,054	40.2	+4.4
Conservative	Elisabeth Tilbrook	396	15.0	–6.7
Majority		116	4.5	N/A
Turnout		2,641	28.6	+1.7
Rejected ballots		21		
Registered electors		9,238		
Independent gain from Labour Co-op		Swing	▲5.8	

=== Stalybridge South ===
Stalybridge South
Party	Candidate	Votes	%	±%
Conservative	David Tilbrook*	1,357	48.4	–0.9
Labour	Stuart Jeffrey McKenzie	1,054	37.6	+1.3
Green	Amanda Jane Hickling	391	14.0	–0.4
Majority		303	10.8	N/A
Turnout		2,826	31.2	+1.1
Rejected ballots		24		
Registered electors		9,054		
Conservative hold		Swing	▼1.1	

== Changes 2024-2026 ==
=== By-elections ===
==== Longdendale ====
Longdendale by-election: 10 April 2025
Party	Candidate	Votes	%	±%
Reform	Allan Hopwood	911	46.6	N/A
Labour Co-op	Francesca Coates	489	25.0	–34.4
Conservative	Kieron Wild	242	12.4	–10.3
Green	Amanda Hickling	237	12.1	–4.5
Independent	Emma Leyla	76	3.9	N/A
Majority		422	21.6	N/A
Turnout		1,965	20.1	–6.6
Registered electors		9,763		
Reform gain from Labour				
