= 2022 Tameside Metropolitan Borough Council election =

2022 local election in England

- 5 May 2022

19 out of 57 seats to Tameside Metropolitan Borough Council 29 seats needed for a majority

	First party	Second party	Third party
Party	Labour	Conservative	Green
Last election	50 seats, 50.8%	6 seats, 35.7%	1 seat, 10.8%
Seats before	50	6	1
Seats won	15	4	0
Seats after	48	8	1
Seat change	▼2	▲2	Steady
Popular vote	26,077	17,332	4,136
Percentage	54.6%	36.3%	8.7%
Swing	▲3.8%	▲0.6%	▼2.1%
- Winner of each seat at the 2022 Tameside Metropolitan Borough Council election
Council control before election
Labour
Council control after election
Labour

The 2022 Tameside Metropolitan Borough Council election took place on 5 May 2022 to elect members of Tameside Metropolitan Borough Council. This was on the same day as other local elections. 19 of the 57 seats were up for election.

== Background ==
Since its creation in 1974, Tameside has always been under Labour control, aside from 1978 to 1982 when the Conservatives held a majority. In the most recent election in 2021, Labour lost one seat to the Conservatives, but increased their vote share by 4.6%, winning a total of 16 seats, with the Conservatives gaining 10.7% and winning 3 seats. The Green Party of England and Wales did not gain any seats, despite winning their first seat in 2019.

The positions up for election in 2021 were last elected in 2018. In that election, Labour achieved 53.8% of the vote, and won 17 seats with 1 gained from the Conservatives, while the Conservatives won 2 with 1 gain from Labour.

== Previous council composition ==
After 2021 election		Before 2022 election	
Party	Seats	Party	Seats
Labour	50	Labour	50
Conservative	6	Conservative	6
Green	1	Green	1

== Results ==
2022 Tameside Metropolitan Borough Council election
Party	This election				Full council			This election		
Party	Candidates	Seats	Net	Seats %	Other	Total	Total %	Votes	Votes %	+/−
Labour	{{{candidates}}}	15	▼2	78.9	33	48	84.2	26,077	54.6	+3.8
Conservative	{{{candidates}}}	4	▲2	21.1	4	8	14.0	17,332	36.3	+0.6
Green	{{{candidates}}}	0	Steady	0.0	1	1	1.8	4,136	8.7	-2.1
Women's Equality	{{{candidates}}}	0	Steady	0.0	0	0	0.0	135	0.3	N/A
Reform	{{{candidates}}}	0	Steady	0.0	0	0	0.0	100	0.2	-0.5

== Results by ward ==
An asterisk indicates an incumbent councillor.

=== Ashton Hurst ===
Ashton Hurst
Party	Candidate	Votes	%	±%
Conservative	Lucy Turner	1,411	50.5	+3.5
Labour	Dolores Lewis*	1,384	49.5	+7.3
Majority		27	1.0	{decrease} 0.5
Turnout		2,795	32.5	{decrease} 1.1
Conservative gain from Labour		Swing	▼1.9	

=== Ashton St. Michael's ===
Ashton St. Michael's
Party	Candidate	Votes	%	±%
Labour	Bill Fairfoull*	1,249	59.9	+3.5
Conservative	Victoria Golas	565	27.1	−0.6
Green	Keith Whitehead	270	13.0	−2.9
Majority		684	32.8	
Turnout		2,096	23.7	
Labour hold		Swing	▲2.1	

=== Ashton Waterloo ===
Ashton Waterloo
Party	Candidate	Votes	%	±%
Labour	Vimal Choksi*	1,290	50.2	+2.9
Green	Lorraine Whitehead	899	35.0	+5.2
Conservative	Pamela Daniels	382	14.9	−8.0
Majority		391	15.2	
Turnout		2,579	30.3	
Labour hold		Swing	▼1.2	

=== Audenshaw ===
Audenshaw
Party	Candidate	Votes	%	±%
Labour	Oliver Ryan*	1,520	52.1	+5.2
Conservative	Danny Mather	1,178	40.4	−4.0
Green	Luke Robinson	221	7.6	−1.1
Majority		342	11.7	
Turnout		2,930	31.1	
Labour hold		Swing	▲4.6	

=== Denton North East ===
Denton North East
Party	Candidate	Votes	%	±%
Labour	Vincent Ricci*	1,211	56.7	−1.8
Conservative	Dawn Cobb	663	31.0	−2.0
Green	John Bradley	163	7.6	−0.9
Reform	Barbara Mitchison	100	4.7	N/A
Majority		548	25.7	
Turnout		2,147	25.8	
Labour hold		Swing	▲0.1	

=== Denton South ===
Denton South
Party	Candidate	Votes	%	±%
Labour	Claire Reid*	1,466	64.9	+0.1
Conservative	Timothy Cho	794	35.1	+8.9
Majority		672	29.8	
Turnout		2,286	28.4	
Labour hold		Swing	▼4.4	

=== Denton West ===
Denton West
Party	Candidate	Votes	%	±%
Labour	Mike Smith*	1,788	65.9	+3.2
Conservative	Matt Allen	704	26.0	−4.2
Green	Jean Smee	220	8.1	+0.9
Majority		1,084	39.9	
Turnout		2,735	30.0	
Labour hold		Swing	▲3.7	

=== Droylsden East ===
Droylsden East
Party	Candidate	Votes	%	±%
Labour	Sue Quinn*	1,297	57.1	+1.5
Conservative	Harrison Roden	700	30.8	−3.0
Green	Louise Axon	276	12.1	+1.5
Majority		597	26.3	
Turnout		2,298	25.7	
Labour hold		Swing	▲2.3	

=== Droylsden West ===
Droylsden West
Party	Candidate	Votes	%	±%
Labour	Barrie Holland*	1,476	69.0	+11.5
Conservative	Matthew Stevenson	664	31.0	+6.6
Majority		812	38.0	
Turnout		2,174	25.1	
Labour hold		Swing	▲2.5	

=== Dukinfield ===
Dukinfield
Party	Candidate	Votes	%	±%
Labour	Jacqueline Lane*	1,263	58.0	+4.5
Conservative	James Cooper	602	27.6	−6.5
Green	Julie Wood	313	14.4	+2.0
Majority		661	30.4	
Turnout		2,184	23.5	
Labour hold		Swing	▲5.5	

=== Dukinfield Stalybridge ===
Dukinfield Stalybridge
Party	Candidate	Votes	%	±%
Labour	Eleanor Wills*	1,256	46.3	+1.0
Conservative	Kurt McPartland	1,159	42.7	−2.1
Green	Linda Freeman	300	11.0	+1.0
Majority		97	3.6	
Turnout		2,734	31.4	
Labour hold		Swing	▲1.6	

=== Hyde Godley ===
Hyde Godley
Party	Candidate	Votes	%	±%
Conservative	Andrea Colbourne	1,417	51.5	+7.8
Labour	David McAllister	1,334	48.5	+3.1
Majority		83	3.0	
Turnout		2,779	29.6	
Conservative gain from Labour		Swing	▲2.4	

=== Hyde Newton ===
Hyde Newton
Party	Candidate	Votes	%	±%
Labour	Hugh Roderick	1,572	58.9	+7.3
Conservative	Melissa Molloy	1,097	41.1	+7.4
Majority		475	17.8	
Turnout		2,704	24.7	
Labour hold		Swing	▼0.1	

=== Hyde Werneth ===
Hyde Werneth
Party	Candidate	Votes	%	±%
Conservative	Phil Chadwick*	1,830	52.9	+2.2
Labour	John Mercer	1,356	39.2	−0.7
Green	Alex Cooper	273	7.9	+1.6
Majority		474	13.7	
Turnout		3,468	38.7	
Conservative hold		Swing	▲1.5	

=== Longdendale ===
Longdendale
Party	Candidate	Votes	%	±%
Labour	Janet Cooper*	1,371	65.7	+12.7
Conservative	Lavlu Kader	715	34.3	+5.2
Majority		656	31.4	
Turnout		2,124	27.3	
Labour hold		Swing	▲3.8	

=== Mossley ===
Mossley
Party	Candidate	Votes	%	±%
Labour	Stephen Homer*	1,469	54.8	+0.9
Conservative	Andrew Hay	733	27.3	−3.6
Green	Christine Clark	344	12.8	−2.4
Women's Equality	Hattie Thomas	135	5.0	N/A
Majority		736	27.5	
Turnout		2,699	30.7	
Labour hold		Swing	▲2.3	

=== St. Peters ===
St. Peters
Party	Candidate	Votes	%	±%
Labour	Joyce Bowerman*	1,696	72.5	+3.5
Conservative	David Rose	367	15.7	−1.5
Green	Trevor Clarke	276	11.8	+1.9
Majority		1,329	56.8	
Turnout		2,354	24.3	
Labour hold		Swing	▲2.5	

=== Stalybridge North ===
Stalybridge North
Party	Candidate	Votes	%	±%
Labour	Sam Gosling*	1,129	46.8	+5.9
Conservative	David Tilbrook	977	40.5	+8.2
Green	Alice Mason-Power	308	12.8	+5.2
Majority		152	6.3	
Turnout		2,428	26.4	
Labour hold		Swing	▼1.2	

=== Stalybridge South ===
Stalybridge South
Party	Candidate	Votes	%	±%
Conservative	Liam Billington*	1,374	52.9	−7.2
Labour	Nick Axford	950	36.6	+6.6
Green	Amanda Hickling	273	10.5	+0.6
Majority		424	16.3	
Turnout		2,612	30.8	
Conservative hold		Swing	▼6.9	
