= 1973 Tameside Metropolitan Borough Council election =

Election to Tameside Council

1973 Tameside Metropolitan Borough Council Council election
10 May 1973	1975 →

All 54 seats to Tameside Metropolitan Borough Council 28 seats needed for a majority
- Turnout

	First party	Second party	Third party
Leader	George Newton	Colin Grantham
Party	Labour	Conservative	Liberal
Leader's seat	Dukinfield	Hyde: Werneth
Seats won	38	14	2
Popular vote	78,213	57,063	15,181
Percentage	51.2%	37.4%	9.9%
Leader after election
George Newton
Labour

The first elections to Tameside Council were held on Thursday, 10 May 1973. This was a new council created to replace the municipal boroughs of Ashton-under-Lyne, Dukinfield, Hyde, Mossley, and Stalybridge, and the urban districts of Audenshaw, Denton, Droylesden, and Longdendale. This election would create the entire 54-member council, which would shadow its predecessor councils before taking over their functions on 1 April 1974, as specified in the Local Government Act 1972. Each 1st-placed candidate would serve a five-year term of office, expiring in 1978. Each 2nd-placed candidate would serve a three-year term of office, expiring in 1976. Each 3rd-placed candidate would serve a two-year term of office, expiring in 1975.

The Labour Party won overall control of the council.

== Election result ==
Party	Votes	Seats	
Labour Party	78,213 (51.2%)	38 (70.4%)	38 / 54
Conservative Party	57,063 (37.4%)	14 (25.9%)	14 / 54
Liberal Party	15,181 (9.9%)	2 (3.7%)	2 / 54
Residents	2,002 (1.3%)	0 (0.0%)	0 / 54
Communist Party	269 (0.2%)	0 (0.0%)	0 / 54

↓
38	2	14

== Ward results ==
=== No.1 (Ashton: Market & St. Michael's) ===
Ashton: Market & St. Michael's
Party	Candidate	Votes	%	±%
Conservative	R. Thorpe	1,409	50.9	
Conservative	J. Jones	1,378		
Conservative	R. Fish	1,365		
Labour	D. Jackson	1,359	49.1	
Labour	W. Raybould	1,332		
Labour	S. Tomkinson	1,300		
Majority		6		
Turnout			31.3	
Conservative win (new seat)				
Conservative win (new seat)				
Conservative win (new seat)				

=== No.2 (Ashton: St. Peter's & Portland Place) ===
Ashton: St. Peter's & Portland Place
Party	Candidate	Votes	%	±%
Labour	J. Holland	1,379	61.3	
Labour	P. McEnaney	1,317		
Labour	J. Pettit	1,279		
Conservative	N. Jackson	870	38.7	
Conservative	E. Barber	799		
Conservative	R. Hoy	793		
Majority		409		
Turnout			25.9	
Labour win (new seat)				
Labour win (new seat)				
Labour win (new seat)				

=== No.3 (Ashton: West & Limehurst) ===
Ashton: West & Limehurst
Party	Candidate	Votes	%	±%
Labour	P. Travis	1,886	59.2	
Labour	J. Eason	1,814		
Labour	R. Nolan	1,691		
Conservative	R. Fleetwood	1,298	40.8	
Conservative	K. Tetlow	1,293		
Conservative	W. Dunkerley	1,289		
Majority		393		
Turnout			27.3	
Labour win (new seat)				
Labour win (new seat)				
Labour win (new seat)				

=== No.4 (Ashton: East) ===
Ashton: East
Party	Candidate	Votes	%	±%
Conservative	L. Bell	899	53.7	
Conservative	M. Newsome	848		
Conservative	W. Adshead	826		
Labour	S. Harrison	774	46.3	
Labour	J. Marsden	754		
Labour	B. Davenport	753		
Majority		52		
Turnout			25.9	
Conservative win (new seat)				
Conservative win (new seat)				
Conservative win (new seat)				

=== No.5 (Dukinfield) ===
Dukinfield
Party	Candidate	Votes	%	±%
Labour	J. Cook	2,803	50.7	
Labour	G. Newton	2,672		
Labour	G. Hatton	2,668		
Conservative	W. Kirk	1,758	31.8	
Conservative	A. Fox	1,491		
Conservative	L. Smart	1,442		
Liberal	J. Ratcliffe	970	17.5	
Liberal	S. Driver	809		
Liberal	F. Rainsbury	727		
Majority		910		
Turnout			41.8	
Labour win (new seat)				
Labour win (new seat)				
Labour win (new seat)				

=== No.6 (Hyde: Godley) ===
Hyde: Godley
Party	Candidate	Votes	%	±%
Labour	E. Threlfall	1,359	55.3	
Labour	R. Smith	1,316		
Labour	F. Hindley	1,276		
Conservative	L. King	831	33.8	
Conservative	E. Jones	828		
Conservative	R. Gregory	800		
Communist	D. Herrick	269	10.9	
Majority		445		
Turnout			25.4	
Labour win (new seat)				
Labour win (new seat)				
Labour win (new seat)				

=== No.7 (Hyde: Newton) ===
Hyde: Newton
Party	Candidate	Votes	%	±%
Liberal	H. White	1,731	39.7	
Labour	J. Fitzpatrick	1,445	33.2	
Labour	M. Bayes	1,357		
Labour	F. Shaw	1,280		
Conservative	J. Keighley	1,180	27.1	
Conservative	W. Barton	832		
Majority		77		
Turnout			50.7	
Liberal win (new seat)				
Labour win (new seat)				
Labour win (new seat)				

=== No.8 (Hyde: Werneth) ===
Hyde: Werneth
Party	Candidate	Votes	%	±%
Conservative	E. Clark	1,945	58.1	
Conservative	C. Grantham	1,943		
Conservative	W. Jones	1,906		
Labour	W. Cullen	1,401	41.9	
Labour	P. Robinson	1,254		
Labour	N. Harris	1,239		
Majority		505		
Turnout			37.8	
Conservative win (new seat)				
Conservative win (new seat)				
Conservative win (new seat)				

=== No.9 (Mossley) ===
Mossley
Party	Candidate	Votes	%	±%
Labour	J. Brierley	1,433	40.7	
Labour	B. Dobbins	1,289		
Conservative	H. Hunt	1,272	36.2	
Conservative	H. Bentley	1,178		
Conservative	J. Downs	1,117		
Labour	E. Durkin	1,094		
Liberal	H. Rawson	812	23.1	
Liberal	R. Thornber	723		
Liberal	F. Rigby	524		
Majority		94		
Turnout			45.3	
Labour win (new seat)				
Labour win (new seat)				
Conservative win (new seat)				

=== No.10 (Stalybridge: Lancashire & Dukinfield) ===
Stalybridge: Lancashire & Dukinfield
Party	Candidate	Votes	%	±%
Labour	J. Webb	1,104	50.4	
Labour	J. Thornley	1,086		
Labour	J. Sleigh	1,057		
Conservative	T. Wood	653	29.8	
Conservative	B. Grainger	627		
Conservative	H. Oates	596		
Liberal	E. Greenwood	432	19.7	
Liberal	J. Sharkett	407		
Liberal	K. Dalton	399		
Majority		404		
Turnout			29.1	
Labour win (new seat)				
Labour win (new seat)				
Labour win (new seat)				

=== No.11 (Stalybridge: Millbrook & Staley) ===
Stalybridge: Millbrook & Staley
Party	Candidate	Votes	%	±%
Labour	C. Meredith	1,605	41.9	
Conservative	Clark	1,365	35.6	
Labour	Porter	1,282		
Conservative	Marsh	1,280		
Labour	Hulse	1,188		
Conservative	W. Jones	1,140		
Liberal	Ardern	863	22.5	
Liberal	Swann	676		
Liberal	Bayley	557		
Majority		2		
Turnout			39.6	
Labour win (new seat)				
Conservative win (new seat)				
Labour win (new seat)				

=== No.12 (Audenshaw) ===
Audenshaw
Party	Candidate	Votes	%	±%
Labour	F. Hadfield	1,651	40.2	
Conservative	D. Ogden	1,443	35.2	
Conservative	P. Greenhough	1,412		
Labour	F. Ruffley	1,361		
Labour	F. Ruffley	1,318		
Conservative	E. Proctor	1,311		
Residents	A. McFindley	1,011	24.6	
Residents	J. Skelton	991		
Majority		51		
Turnout			47.2	
Labour win (new seat)				
Conservative win (new seat)				
Conservative win (new seat)				

=== No.13 (Denton: South East) ===
Denton: South East
Party	Candidate	Votes	%	±%
Labour	T. Etchells	1,164	64.8	
Labour	F. Booth	1,134		
Labour	T. Lomas	1,082		
Conservative	W. Hellowell	633	35.2	
Conservative	H. Jarrett	582		
Conservative	M. Kershaw	558		
Majority		449		
Turnout			23.7	
Labour win (new seat)				
Labour win (new seat)				
Labour win (new seat)				

=== No.14 (Denton: South West) ===
Denton: South West
Party	Candidate	Votes	%	±%
Conservative	F. Adshead	1,349	40.5	
Labour	J. Cooper	1,302	39.1	
Labour	E. Delahunty	1,276		
Labour	H. Myles	1,260		
Conservative	R. Abbey	1,218		
Conservative	B. Lowndes	1,209		
Liberal	J. Ward	677	20.3	
Liberal	F. Booth	639		
Liberal	R. Ward	526		
Majority		16		
Turnout			37.8	
Conservative win (new seat)				
Labour win (new seat)				
Labour win (new seat)				

=== No.15 (Denton: North East) ===
Denton: North East
Party	Candidate	Votes	%	±%
Labour	J. Devaney	2,031	65.8	
Labour	D. Wimpenny	1,971		
Labour	E. Beard	1,902		
Conservative	E. Sweeten	1,055	34.2	
Conservative	E. Williamson	974		
Majority		847		
Turnout			25.5	
Labour win (new seat)				
Labour win (new seat)				
Labour win (new seat)				

=== No.16 (Droylesden: North West) ===
Droylesden: North West
Party	Candidate	Votes	%	±%
Liberal	T. Dowse	1,419	38.9	
Labour	G. James	1,401	38.4	
Labour	P. Warne	1,361		
Labour	A. Galley	1,340		
Liberal	M. Warner	1,187		
Liberal	C. Dyer	1,103		
Conservative	C. Tomkinson	827	22.7	
Conservative	F. Carroll	719		
Conservative	A. Broadhurst	656		
Majority		21		
Turnout			37.0	
Liberal win (new seat)				
Labour win (new seat)				
Labour win (new seat)				

=== No.17 (Droylesden: South East) ===
Droylesden: South East
Party	Candidate	Votes	%	±%
Labour	T. Dent	1,515	60.5	
Labour	J. Hales	1,427		
Labour	T. Lomas	1,409		
Conservative	H. Butler	990	39.5	
Conservative	L. Johnson	978		
Conservative	J. Stelfox	944		
Majority		419		
Turnout			32.6	
Labour win (new seat)				
Labour win (new seat)				
Labour win (new seat)				

=== No.18 (Longdendale) ===
Longdendale
Party	Candidate	Votes	%	±%
Labour	S. Oldham	1,951	65.0	
Labour	C. Shaw	1,784		
Labour	A. Mercer	1,727		
Conservative	W. Griffiths	1,050	35.0	
Conservative	H. Williams	987		
Conservative	W. Greaves	952		
Majority		677		
Turnout			38.9	
Labour win (new seat)				
Labour win (new seat)				
Labour win (new seat)				
