= 2026 Tameside Metropolitan Borough Council election =

2026 English local government election

- 7 May 2026

19 out of 57 seats to Tameside Metropolitan Borough Council 29 seats needed for a majority
- Turnout: 40.0%
	First party	Second party
Leader	Eleanor Wills	Rob Barrowcliffe
Party	Labour	Reform
Last election	48 seats, 52.1%	Did not stand
Seats before	39 (Note: Includes the vacant seat in Denton South last held by Labour.)	1
Seats won	1	18
Seats after	25	19
Seat change	▼14	▲18
Popular vote	16,698	29,418
Percentage	23.9%	42.1%
Swing	▼28.2%	N/A
	Third party	Fourth party
Leader		Doreen Dickinson
Party	Independent	Conservative
Last election	2 seats, 8.0%	7 seats, 20.3%
Seats before	10 (Note: Of the 10 Independents before the election, 2 sat in the Independent Group and 8 were non-aligned.)	7
Seats won	0	0
Seats after	8	5
Seat change	▼2	▼2
Popular vote	3,050	7,006
Percentage	4.4%	10.0%
Swing	▼3.6%	▼10.3%
- Winner of each seat at the 2026 Tameside Metropolitan Borough Council election.
Leader before election
Eleanor Wills
Labour
Leader after election
Eleanor Wills
Labour
No overall control

The 2026 Tameside Metropolitan Borough Council election was held on Thursday 7 May 2026, alongside other local elections in the United Kingdom. One third of the 57 members of Tameside Metropolitan Borough Council in Greater Manchester were contested.

Prior to the election, the council had been under Labour majority control for 47 years. At this election, the council went under no overall control. Reform UK won 18 of the 19 seats being contested, and overtook the Conservatives to become the second largest party on the council. Labour remained the largest party on the council, but were left four seats short of a majority. After the election, Labour managed to form a minority administration; Labour's incumbent leader of the council, Eleanor Wills, was reappointed to the role at the subsequent annual council meeting on 26 May 2026.

== Council composition ==
After 2024 election		Before 2026 election		After 2026 election	
Party	Seats	Party	Seats	Party	Seats
Labour	48	Labour	38	Labour	25
Conservative	7	Conservative	7	Conservative	5
Reform	0	Reform	1	Reform	19
Independent	2	Independent	10	Independent	8
Vacant	N/A	Vacant	1	Vacant	N/A

Changes 2024–2026:

- February 2025:
  - Jacqueline North (Labour) resigns – by-election held April 2025
  - Ged Cooney, Allison Gwynne, George Jones, Charlotte Martin, Jack Naylor, George Newton, Claire Reid, Vincent Ricci, Denise Ward, and Brenda Warrington (Labour) suspended from party
- April 2025:
  - Allan Hopwood (Reform) gains by-election from Labour
  - Gary Ferguson (Labour) leaves party to sit as an independent
- August 2025: Allison Gwynne, George Jones, Claire Reid, Denise Ward, and Brenda Warrington (Independent) readmitted to Labour (Note: Vincent Ricci was also readmitted but resigned from the party.)
- October 2025: Ann Holland (Labour) leaves party to sit as an independent
- November 2025:
  - Claire Reid (Labour) resigns – seat left vacant until 2026 election
  - Barrie Holland (Labour) leaves party to sit as an independent

== Summary ==
=== Background ===
Tameside Metropolitan Borough Council was created in 1974. Aside from a brief period from 1976 to 1980, Labour had formed majority administrations. Each election has since 1980 had returned a Labour administration holding over 70% of the seats with the Conservatives forming the principal opposition for all but three elections. The 2024 election saw Labour lose 2 seats to independents and 1 seat to the Conservatives, but retain their majority.

Over the course of the 2024 to 2026 term, Labour fell to its lowest number of councillors in over 50 years. 10 Labour councillors were suspended during an investigation into offensive messages shared to a WhatsApp group, of which Andrew Gwynne MP was also a part. 5 of these were reinstated on the conclusion of the investigation, but a further 5 seats were lost through defections or resignations.

The 2023 election used a new set of ward boundaries. As such, this election will be for councillors elected with the second highest number of votes in each of the 57 three-member wards. Of the seats contested, Labour held 14, the Conservatives held 2, independents held 2, and one was vacant following the resignation of Labour councillor Claire Reid.

=== Police investigation ===
Following the election, Greater Manchester Police arrested four men and a woman on suspicion of fraud offences related to allegations that fake independent candidates were entered into the election for the St Peter's ward to influence its outcome. The police said the arrests related to its investigation into the "process of how candidates were put forward and represented in the ward, and if this adhered to the relevant legislation and electoral procedures".

=== Election result ===
Reform UK won 18 of the 19 seats contested while Labour retained control of St Peter's Ward. Labour remained the largest party but lost their majority on the council, which fell into no overall control.

2026 Tameside Metropolitan Borough Council election
Party	This election				Full council			This election		
Party	Candidates	Seats	Net	Seats %	Other	Total	Total %	Votes	Votes %	+/−
Labour	{{{candidates}}}	1	▼14	5.3	24	25	43.9	16,698	23.9	–28.2
Reform	{{{candidates}}}	18	▲18	94.7	1	19	33.3	29,418	42.1	N/A
Independent	{{{candidates}}}	0	▼2	0.0	8	8	14.0	3,050	4.4	–3.6
Conservative	{{{candidates}}}	0	▼2	0.0	5	5	8.8	7,006	10.0	–10.3
Green	{{{candidates}}}	0	Steady	0.0	0	0	0.0	12,675	18.1	+0.5
Liberal Democrats	{{{candidates}}}	0	Steady	0.0	0	0	0.0	663	0.9	–0.6
Workers Party	{{{candidates}}}	0	Steady	0.0	0	0	0.0	245	0.4	–0.2
Your Party	{{{candidates}}}	0	Steady	0.0	0	0	0.0	123	0.2	N/A
Monster Raving Loony	{{{candidates}}}	0	Steady	0.0	0	0	0.0	48	0.1	N/A

== Incumbents ==
Ward	Incumbent councillor	Party	Re-standing
Ashton Hurst	Dan Costello	Conservative	No
Ashton St Michael's	Bill Fairfoull	Labour	Yes
Ashton Waterloo	Dave Howarth	Labour	No
Audenshaw	Nick Axford	Labour	Yes
Denton North East	Denise Ward	Labour	Yes
Denton South	Claire Reid (Note: Resigned from seat in November 2025. Seat left vacant until the 2026 election.)	Labour	No
Denton West	Branda Warrington	Labour	Yes
Droylsden East	Susan Quinn	Labour	Yes
Droylsden West	Ann Holland (Note: Originally elected as Labour, but left the party to sit as an independent in October 2025.)	Independent	Yes
Dukinfield	John Taylor	Labour	Yes
Dukinfield Stalybridge	David Sweeton	Labour	Yes
Hyde Godley	Betty Affleck	Labour	Yes
Hyde Newton	Peter Robinson	Labour	Yes
Hyde Werneth	Shibley Alam	Labour	Yes
Longdendale	Gary Ferguson (Note: Originally elected as Labour, but left the party to sit as an independent in April 2025.)	Independent	No
Mossley	Tafheen Sharif	Labour	Yes
St Peter's	Warren Bray	Labour	No
Stalybridge North	Adrian Pearce	Labour	Yes
Stalybridge South	Liam Billington	Conservative	Yes

== Ward results ==
=== Ashton Hurst ===
Ashton Hurst
Party	Candidate	Votes	%	±%
Reform	Keiron Lawrence	1,410	37.7	N/A
Labour	Noreen Shahzad	806	21.5	−22.3
Conservative	Rachel Taylor	797	21.3	−15.0
Green	Paige Iborra	588	15.7	−4.2
Independent	Samantha Aspin	143	3.8	N/A
Rejected ballots		17	0.5	-0.1
Turnout		3,744	43.1	+11.8
Registered electors		8,736		
Reform gain from Conservative				

=== Ashton St Michael’s ===
Ashton St Michael’s
Party	Candidate	Votes	%	±%
Reform	Danny Carr	1,265	37.0	N/A
Labour	Bill Fairfoull*	916	26.8	−16.3
Green	Morgan Murphy	784	22.9	N/A
Conservative	David Taylor	235	6.9	−8.8
Independent	Hasnain Mehmood	217	6.4	−25.8
Rejected ballots		9	0.3	-0.9
Turnout		3,417	37.2	+8.3
Registered electors		9,219		
Reform gain from Labour				

=== Ashton Waterloo ===
Ashton Waterloo
Party	Candidate	Votes	%	±%
Reform	Raymond Dunning	1,672	40.2	N/A
Labour	Muhammad Tahir	974	23.4	−29.0
Green	Lee Huntbach	959	23.0	−24.6
Independent	Emma Jones	559	13.4	N/A
Rejected ballots		11	0.3	-2.7
Turnout		4,164	44.5	+14.8
Registered electors		9,384		
Reform gain from Labour				

=== Audenshaw ===
Audenshaw
Party	Candidate	Votes	%	±%
Reform	Kim Roberts	1,906	43.2	N/A
Labour	Nick Axford*	1,022	23.1	−33.8
Green	Glenn Piper	983	22.3	−16.2
Conservative	Thomas Dunne	506	11.5	N/A
Rejected ballots		24	0.5	-4.1
Turnout		4,417	44.2	+14.5
Registered electors		10,056		
Reform gain from Labour				

=== Denton North East ===
Denton North East
Party	Candidate	Votes	%	±%
Reform	Aron Webb	1,668	49.9	N/A
Labour	Denise Ward*	778	23.3	−41.5
Green	Jane Martin	631	18.9	−12.4
Conservative	Veronica Dawson	265	7.9	N/A
Rejected ballots		14	0.4	-0.2
Turnout		3,342	37.5	+12.4
Registered electors		8,952		
Reform gain from Labour				

=== Denton South ===
Denton South
Party	Candidate	Votes	%	±%
Reform	Audra Murray	1,732	52.6	N/A
Green	Jackie Olden	692	21.0	+9.5
Labour	Alexander Culbert	606	18.4	−48.8
Conservative	Peter Cotton	217	6.6	−13.3
Monster Raving Loony	Lord Febrezeo Quinnoa-Stakebake	48	1.5	N/A
Rejected ballots		4	0.1	-1.4
Turnout		3,295	37.4	+9.5
Registered electors		8,819		
Reform gain from Labour				

=== Denton West ===
Denton West
Party	Candidate	Votes	%	±%
Reform	Dan Bennett	1,981	49.6	N/A
Labour	Brenda Warrington*	952	23.8	−42.4
Green	Tony Tibbenham	859	21.5	+7.6
Conservative	Shoaib Akhtar	204	5.1	−13.0
Rejected ballots		15	0.4	-1.5
Turnout		3,996	43.4	+11.0
Registered electors		9,235		
Reform gain from Labour				

=== Droylsden East ===
Droylsden East
Party	Candidate	Votes	%	±%
Reform	Caroline England	1,683	48.9	N/A
Labour	Susan Quinn*	803	23.3	−34.0
Green	Archie Young	608	17.7	+5.4
Liberal Democrats	James Lloyd	227	6.6	−3.7
Your Party	Tony Wilson	123	3.6	N/A
Rejected ballots		21	0.6	-1.2
Turnout		3,444	39.6	+12.2
Registered electors		8,756		
Reform gain from Labour				

=== Droylsden West ===
Droylsden West
Party	Candidate	Votes	%	±%
Reform	Sharon Barker	1,627	46.0	N/A
Labour	Rebecca Callaghan	729	20.6	−39.7
Green	Laura Rose	560	15.8	−2.8
Independent	Ann Holland	353	10.0	N/A
Conservative	Paul Molloy	151	4.3	−14.5
Liberal Democrats	Joe Johnson	118	3.3	N/A
Rejected ballots		13	0.4	-1.9
Turnout		3,538	40.9	+13.3
Registered electors		8,692		
Reform gain from Independent				

=== Dukinfield ===
Dukinfield
Party	Candidate	Votes	%	±%
Reform	James Rhodes	1,571	49.2	N/A
Labour	John Taylor*	750	23.5	−36.9
Green	Michael Harrison	657	20.6	−14.5
Conservative	Adam Wolstenholme	218	6.8	N/A
Rejected ballots		9	0.3	-4.2
Turnout		3,196	35.1	+10.8
Registered electors		9,120		
Reform gain from Labour				

=== Dukinfield Stalybridge ===
Dukinfield Stalybridge
Party	Candidate	Votes	%	±%
Reform	Jake Frater	1,718	47.9	N/A
Labour	Dave Sweeton*	858	23.9	−22.9
Green	Matt Alloway	525	14.7	−4.1
Conservative	Malcolm Smith	342	9.5	−22.9
Liberal Democrats	Linda Freeman	140	3.9	N/A
Rejected ballots		4	0.1	-1.9
Turnout		3,583	40.5	+11.3
Registered electors		8,848		
Reform gain from Labour				

=== Hyde Godley ===
Hyde Godley
Party	Candidate	Votes	%	±%
Reform	Mark Beese	1,287	35.8	N/A
Labour	Betty Affleck*	769	21.4	−16.2
Green	John Bradley	650	18.1	+0.6
Conservative	Callum Percival	640	17.8	−25.9
Workers Party	Faisal Nixon	245	6.8	N/A
Rejected ballots		12	0.3	-0.9
Turnout		3,591	42.1	+9.3
Registered electors		8,577		
Reform gain from Labour				

=== Hyde Newton ===
Hyde Newton
Party	Candidate	Votes	%	±%
Reform	Sam Mooney	1,482	45.1	N/A
Labour	Peter Robinson*	703	21.4	−30.7
Green	Hannah Yates	609	18.5	N/A
Conservative	Andrew Moss	224	6.8	−14.8
Independent	Philip Fitzpatrick	136	4.1	N/A
Liberal Democrats	Peter Ball-Foster	133	4.0	−8.9
Rejected ballots		9	0.3	-0.7
Turnout		3,287	35.6	+11.3
Registered electors		9,265		
Reform gain from Labour				

=== Hyde Werneth ===
Hyde Werneth
Party	Candidate	Votes	%	±%
Reform	Christopher Stones	1,287	29.9	N/A
Conservative	Andy Furnival	1,218	28.3	−9.7
Labour	Shibley Alam*	947	22.0	−12.3
Green	Chris Parr	796	18.5	+0.6
Independent	Abdullah Imran	51	1.2	−8.2
Rejected ballots		18	0.4	–0.1
Turnout		4,299	45.2	+8.8
Registered electors		9,556		
Reform gain from Labour				

=== Longdendale ===
Longendale
Party	Candidate	Votes	%	±%
Reform	Greg McNally	1,581	45.5	N/A
Labour	Francesca Coates	909	26.2	−33.2
Green	Luke Robinson	555	16.0	−0.6
Conservative	Roy Miller	306	8.8	−13.9
Liberal Democrats	Lucas North	123	3.5	N/A
Rejected ballots		5	0.1	–1.2
Turnout		3,474	35.3	+8.6
Registered electors		9,868		
Reform gain from Independent				

=== Mossley ===
Mossley
Party	Candidate	Votes	%	±%
Reform	Gary Roylance	1,625	39.3	N/A
Labour	Taf Sharif*	1,551	37.5	−24.5
Green	Simon Irving	697	16.9	−0.4
Conservative	Daniel Percival	259	6.3	−12.9
Rejected ballots		9	0.2	–1.3
Turnout		4,132	46.8	+15.0
Registered electors		8,841		
Reform gain from Labour				

=== St Peter’s ===
St Peter’s
Party	Candidate	Votes	%	±%
Labour	Atta Ul-Rasool	1,352	36.7	−7.2
Independent	Ahmed Mehmood	1,175	31.9	−24.2
Reform	Gaynor Francis	864	23.5	N/A
Independent	Marie Fairhurst	174	4.7	N/A
Independent	Muhammad Ali	117	3.2	N/A
Rejected ballots		35	1.0	-1.8
Turnout		3,682	38.3	+6.7
Registered electors		9,705		
Labour hold		Swing	▲8.5	

=== Stalybridge North ===
Stalybridge North
Party	Candidate	Votes	%	±%
Reform	Liam Duff	1,748	47.7	N/A
Green	Philip Wilson-Marks	973	26.6	N/A
Labour	Adrian Pearce	708	19.3	−20.9
Conservative	Jim Watson	235	6.4	−8.6
Rejected ballots		12	0.3	–0.5
Turnout		3,664	38.9	+10.3
Registered electors		9,444		
Reform gain from Labour				

=== Stalybridge South ===
Stalybridge South
Party	Candidate	Votes	%	±%
Reform	Jenny Ardron-Adams	1,311	33.7	N/A
Conservative	Liam Billington*	1,189	30.6	−17.8
Labour	David McAllister	565	14.5	−23.1
Green	Amanda Hickling	549	14.1	+0.1
Liberal Democrats	Ian Sharkett	149	3.8	N/A
Independent	Jane Valentine	101	2.6	N/A
Independent	Mike Molloy	24	0.6	N/A
Rejected ballots		19	0.5	–0.3
Turnout		3,888	43.2	+12.0
Registered electors		9,039		
Reform gain from Conservative				
