= John Warrington =

John Warrington can refer to:

- John Warrington (cricketer) (born 1948), New Zealand cricketer
- John Warrington (producer) (born 1962), British television producer
- John Wesley Warrington (1844-1921), American judge
