= Oliver Ryan =

British politician (born 1995)

Oliver Ryan MP
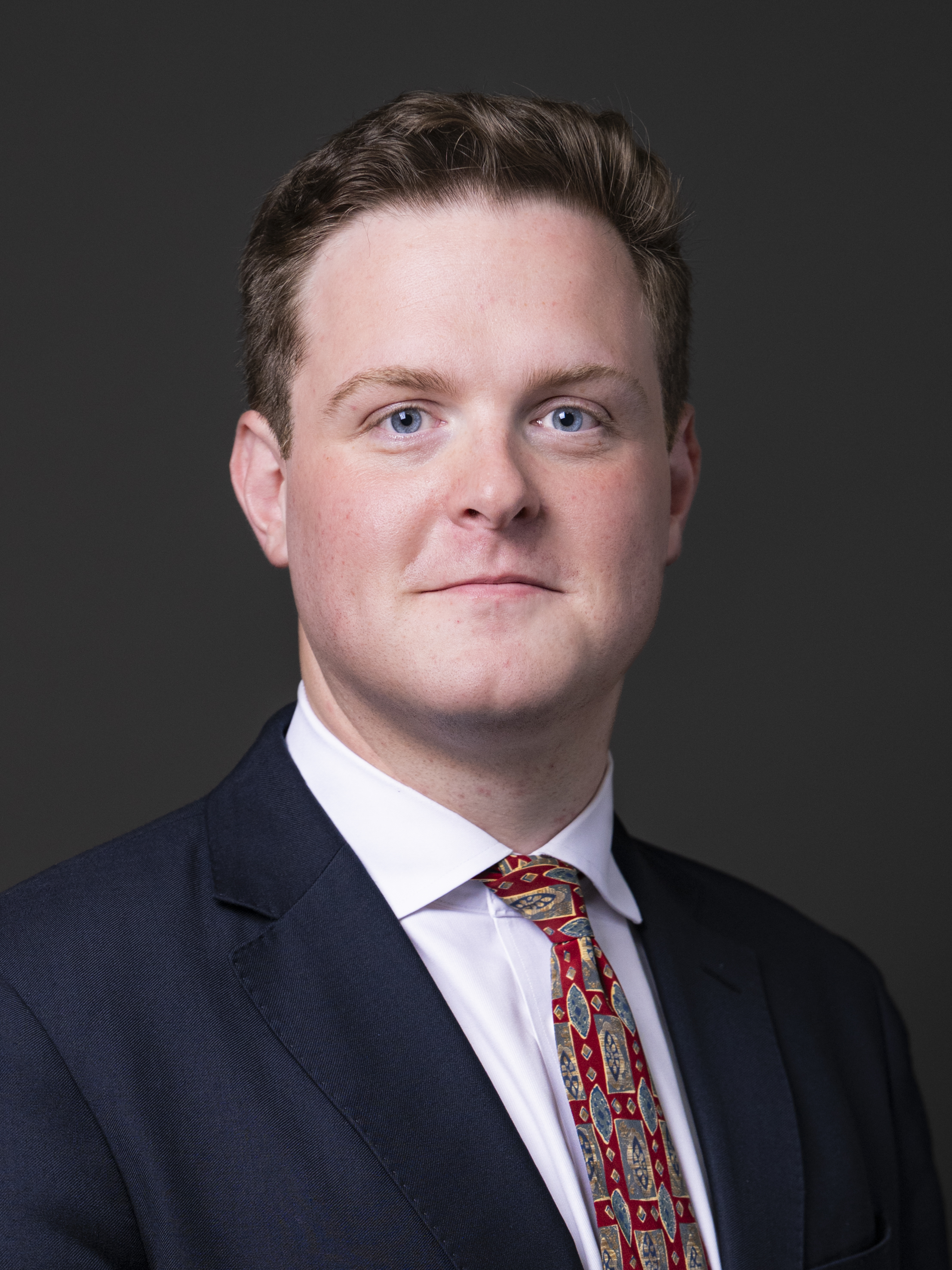
- Official portrait, 2026

Member of Parliament for Burnley
- Incumbent
- Assumed office 4 July 2024
- Preceded by: Antony Higginbotham
- Majority: 3,420 (8.6%)

Personal details
- Born: Oliver David Ryan; 22 April 1995 (age 31) Manchester, England
- Party: Labour Co-op
- Education: University of Manchester (BA); University of Law (GDL)

Oliver David Ryan (born 22 April 1995) is a British Labour Party politician who has served as Member of Parliament for Burnley since 2024.

== Early life ==
Oliver David Ryan was born on 22 April 1995 in Manchester. He is the oldest of four children, and grew up in Droylsden, near Oldham and Ashton-Under-Lyne. Ryan graduated from the University of Manchester with a BA (Hons) in Modern History with Politics in 2016 before obtaining a postgraduate Graduate Diploma in Law (GDL) in Law from the University of Law. He has spoken of the influence his grandparents had on his upbringing; his grandfather David Boyle was a GMB Union official and his grandmother was an NHS nurse.

== Political career ==
Ryan joined the Labour Party in 2010, aged 15. He was elected as the Labour Party councillor for Audenshaw ward in the 2014 Tameside Metropolitan Borough Council election at the age of 19. He retained his seat in the 2018 and 2022 elections. Ryan stood down ahead of the 2023 election. Ryan was then elected as the Labour and Co-operative MP for Burnley in the 2024 election with a majority of 3,420 votes, defeating the incumbent Antony Higginbotham of the Conservative Party.

Ryan has said that his main priority in politics is to break the "generational cycle of worklessness" among some Burnley families. In February 2025, Ryan apologised for comments made in a WhatsApp chat group, after Andrew Gwynne was sacked as a minister and was suspended from the Labour Party, over messages he sent to the same group. Ryan was subsequently also suspended from the Labour parliamentary party. In September 2025, Ryan's membership of the parliamentary Labour Party was reinstated.

On 20 May 2026, he was appointed Parliamentary Private Secretary to the Department of Health and Social Care.

== Electoral performance ==
=== House of Commons ===
General election 2024: Burnley
Party	Candidate	Votes	%	±%
Labour Co-op	Oliver Ryan	12,598	31.7	–8.5
Liberal Democrats	Gordon Birtwistle	9,178	23.1	+15.4
Conservative	Antony Higginbotham	8,058	20.3	–20.2
Reform	Nathan McCollum	7,755	19.5	+12.4
Green	Jack Launer	1,518	3.8	+2.0
Independent	Rayyan Fiass	292	0.7	+0.7
Independent	Mitchell Cryer	169	0.4	+0.4
Independent	David Roper	151	0.4	+0.4
Majority		3,420	8.6	N/A
Turnout		39,719	53	–9.4
Labour gain from Conservative		Swing	+5.8	

=== Tameside Metropolitan Borough Council ===
2022 Tameside Metropolitan Borough Council election: Audenshaw
Party	Candidate	Votes	%	±%
Labour	Oliver Ryan	1,520	52.1	+5.2
Conservative	Danny Mather	1,178	40.4	–4.0
Green	Luke Robinson	221	7.6	–1.1
Majority		342	11.7	
Turnout		2,930	31.1	
Labour hold		Swing	+4.6	

2018 Tameside Metropolitan Borough Council election: Audenshaw
Party	Candidate	Votes	%	±%
Labour	Oliver Ryan	1,581	55.3	+10.0
Conservative	Danny Mather	922	32.2	+5.7
UKIP	Peter Harris	195	6.8	–15.6
Green	Georgia Blakeney	161	5.6	+0.4
Turnout		2,865	30	
Labour hold		Swing		

2014 Tameside Metropolitan Borough Council election: Audenshaw
Party	Candidate	Votes	%	±%
Labour	Oliver Ryan	1,284	42.32	−9.36
UKIP	David Turner	1,162	38.30	N/A
Conservative	Colin White	429	14.14	−18.42
Green	Nancy Jaegar	159	5.24	N/A
Majority		122	4.02	−15.1
Turnout		3,034	33	−29
Labour hold		Swing		

== Personal life ==
Ryan is openly gay.

Parliament of the United Kingdom
Preceded by Antony Higginbotham	Member of Parliament for Burnley; 2024–present	Incumbent
