= 2021 Tameside Metropolitan Borough Council election =

2021 local election in England

Map showing the results of the 2021 Tameside Metropolitan Borough Council election

The 2021 Tameside Metropolitan Borough Council election took place on 6 May 2021 to elect members of Tameside Metropolitan Borough Council in England. This was on the same day as other local elections. One-third of the seats were up for election.

== Results ==
2021 Tameside Metropolitan Borough Council election
Party	This election			Full council			This election		
Party	Seats	Net	Seats %	Other	Total	Total %	Votes	Votes %	+/−
Labour	16	▼1	84.2	34	50	87.7	27,851	50.8	+4.6
Conservative	3	▲1	15.8	3	6	10.5	19,593	35.7	+10.7
Green	0	Steady	0.0	1	1	1.8	5,901	10.8	-5.6
Stalybridge Town Party	0	Steady	0.0	0	0	0.0	546	1.0	-2.0
Liberal Democrats	0	Steady	0.0	0	0	0.0	534	1.0	-0.6
Reform UK	0	Steady	0.0	0	0	0.0	357	0.7	New
Liberal	0	Steady	0.0	0	0	0.0	45	0.1	New

== Ward results ==
=== Ashton Hurst ===
Ashton Hurst
Party	Candidate	Votes	%	±%
Conservative	Dan Costello	1,503	47.0	
Labour	Leigh Drennan	1,349	42.2	
Green	Phil Blakeney	247	7.7	
Liberal Democrats	Matthew Holgate	99	3.1	
Majority		154	4.8	N/A
Turnout		3,208	37	
Conservative gain from Labour		Swing		

=== Ashton St Michael’s ===
Ashton St Michael’s
Party	Candidate	Votes	%	±%
Labour	Jean Drennan	1,411	56.4	
Conservative	Matt Allen	693	27.7	
Green	Keith Whitehead	397	15.9	
Majority		718		
Turnout		2,531	29	
Labour hold		Swing		

=== Ashton Waterloo ===
Ashton Waterloo
Party	Candidate	Votes	%	±%
Labour	Sangita Patel	1,313	47.3	
Green	Lorraine Whitehead	826	29.8	
Conservative	Karen Howarth-Hamilton	636	22.9	
Majority		487		
Turnout		2,800	32	
Labour hold		Swing		

=== Audenshaw ===
Audenshaw
Party	Candidate	Votes	%	±%
Labour	Teresa Smith	1,507	46.9	
Conservative	Danny Mather	1,425	44.4	
Green	Timothy Body	280	8.7	
Majority		82		
Turnout		3,243	34	
Labour hold		Swing		

=== Denton North East ===
Denton North East
Party	Candidate	Votes	%	±%
Labour	Denise Ward	1,487	58.5	
Conservative	Dawn Cobb	840	33.0	
Green	John Bradley	216	8.5	
Majority		647		
Turnout		2,561	30	
Labour hold		Swing		

=== Denton South ===
Denton South
Party	Candidate	Votes	%	±%
Labour	George Newton	1,707	64.8	
Conservative	Timothy Cho	689	26.2	
Green	Ben Hart	140	5.3	
Reform UK	Barbara Kaya	98	3.7	
Majority		1,018		
Turnout		2,648	32	
Labour hold		Swing		

=== Denton West ===
Denton West
Party	Candidate	Votes	%	±%
Labour	George Jones	2,022	62.7	
Conservative	Thomas Dunne	973	30.2	
Green	Jean Smee	231	7.2	
Majority		1,049		
Turnout		3,253	36	
Labour hold		Swing		

=== Droylsden East ===
Droylsden East
Party	Candidate	Votes	%	±%
Labour	David Mills	1,519	55.6	
Conservative	Matt Stevenson	924	33.8	
Green	Louise Axon	289	10.6	
Majority		595		
Turnout		2,759	31	
Labour hold		Swing		

=== Droylsden West ===
Droylsden West
Party	Candidate	Votes	%	±%
Labour	Ged Cooney	1,492	57.5	
Conservative	Harrison Roden	633	24.4	
Green	Annie Train	319	12.3	
Reform UK	Maurice Jackson	150	5.8	
Majority		859		
Turnout		2,605	30	
Labour hold		Swing		

=== Dukinfield ===
Dukinfield
Party	Candidate	Votes	%	±%
Labour	Naila Sharif	1,324	53.5	
Conservative	Lucille Tuner	845	34.1	
Green	Julie Wood	306	12.4	
Majority		479		
Turnout		2,486	27	
Labour hold		Swing		

=== Dukinfield Stalybridge ===
Dukinfield Stalybridge
Party	Candidate	Votes	%	±%
Labour	Leanne Feeley	1,308	45.3	
Conservative	Kurt McPartland	1,295	44.8	
Green	Dawn Anthony	286	9.9	
Majority		13		
Turnout		2,902	34	
Labour hold		Swing		

=== Hyde Godley ===
Hyde Godley
Party	Candidate	Votes	%	±%
Labour	Joe Kitchen	1,353	45.4	
Conservative	Andrea Colbourne	1,301	43.7	
Green	Kenneth Cooper	214	7.2	
Liberal Democrats	Sally Ashe	65	2.2	
Liberal	John Edge	45	1.5	
Majority		52		
Turnout		2,996	32	
Labour hold		Swing		

=== Hyde Newton ===
Hyde Newton
Party	Candidate	Votes	%	±%
Labour	Peter Robinson	1,567	51.6	
Conservative	Melissa Molloy	1,022	33.7	
Green	Mike Baker	263	8.7	
Liberal Democrats	Peter Ball-Foster	183	6.0	
Majority		545		
Turnout		3,057	28	
Labour hold		Swing		

=== Hyde Werneth ===
Hyde Werneth
Party	Candidate	Votes	%	±%
Conservative	Ruth Welsh	1,903	50.7	
Labour	Hugh Roderick	1,496	39.9	
Green	Nicola Harrop	237	6.3	
Liberal Democrats	Richard O’Brien	118	3.1	
Majority		407		
Turnout		3,775	42	
Conservative hold		Swing		

=== Longdendale ===
Longdendale
Party	Candidate	Votes	%	±%
Labour	Jacqueline North	1,357	53.0	
Conservative	Lavlu Kader	746	29.1	
Green	Irene Brierley	390	15.2	
Liberal Democrats	Shaun Offerman	69	2.7	
Majority		611		
Turnout		2,586	33	
Labour hold		Swing		

=== Mossley ===
Mossley
Party	Candidate	Votes	%	±%
Labour	Jack Homer	1,673	53.9	
Conservative	Andrew Hay	959	30.9	
Green	Christine Clark	471	15.2	
Majority		714		
Turnout		3,118	36	
Labour hold		Swing		

=== St Peters ===
St Peters
Party	Candidate	Votes	%	±%
Labour	Warren Bray	1,892	69.0	
Conservative	David Rose	471	17.2	
Green	Trevor Clarke	272	9.9	
Reform UK	Christopher Tompson	109	4.0	
Majority		1,421		
Turnout		2,771	29	
Labour hold		Swing		

=== Stalybridge North ===
Stalybridge North
Party	Candidate	Votes	%	±%
Labour	Jan Jackson	1,167	40.9	
Conservative	David Tilbrook	920	32.3	
Stalybridge Town Party	Lee Stafford	546	19.2	
Green	Dave Fernley	217	7.6	
Majority		247	8.6	
Turnout		2,869	31	
Labour hold		Swing		

=== Stalybridge South ===
Stalybridge South
Party	Candidate	Votes	%	±%
Conservative	Doreen Dickinson	1,815	60.1	
Labour	Paul Thompson	907	30.0	
Green	Amanda Hickling	300	9.9	
Majority		908	30.1	
Turnout		3,046	36	
Conservative hold		Swing		
