= Brenda Warrington =

British Labour politician

Leader of Tameside Metropolitan Borough Council
- In office 31 January 2018 – 19 May 2022
- Preceded by: Kieran Quinn
- Succeeded by: Ged Cooney

Member of the Greater Manchester Combined Authority
- In office January 2018 – 19 May 2022

Member of Tameside Metropolitan Borough Council for Denton West
- In office 2 May 2002 – May 2026
- Succeeded by: Dan Bennett

Personal details
- Party: Labour

Brenda Warrington is an English Labour politician who was leader of Tameside Metropolitan Borough Council in Greater Manchester from 2018 to 2022. She was suspended from the Labour Party in 2025, amid the "Trigger Me Timbers" WhatsApp group investigation.

== Biography ==
Warrington was the Chair of the Greater Manchester Pension Fund, which is managed by Tameside Metropolitan Borough Council.

First elected to the council in 2002, she represents the ward of Denton West and was elected leader of the council on 31 January 2018, following the sudden death of the predecessor Kieran Quinn the previous month. She was the first woman to hold the role.

As leader, Warrington was also a member of the Greater Manchester Combined Authority and was the combined authority's portfolio lead for healthy lives & quality care. She led the Age-Friendly Greater Manchester initiative, advocating for creative activities to be available to elderly residents and "social prescribing." In 2020, Warrington co-chaired the newly established Greater Manchester Women and Girls Equality Panel. She also supported the launch of The Town House initiative by Tameside Council’s Homelessness Team.

In February 2022, Warrington launched a scheme to build 2,150 homes on green belt land in Hyde in order to meet a housing target set by the government, which was met with 3,400 objections. The proposed scheme also lead to her being called "Brenda the Bulldozer" by two councillors opposed to the scheme.

Warrington resigned as council leader on 17 May 2022 to avoid defeat in a leadership contest that she described as a "hostile challenge" by her successor Ged Cooney. After her resignation, she continued to serve on the council and represent Denton West, and said that it had been a "challenge and a huge privilege" to hold the role of executive leader.

Later in 2022, Warrington was appointed as head of the children’s services scrutiny panel, which had previously been rated ‘inadequate’ by Ofsted. She resigned from the role in February 2025, as one of 10 Labour representatives suspended from the party due to an investigation following the exposure of offensive messages in the controversial "Trigger Me Timbers" WhatsApp group.

Warrington was defeated for re-election at the 2026 Tameside Metropolitan Borough Council election, losing her seat to Reform UK candidate Dan Bennett.

Political offices
Preceded by Kieran Quinn	Leader of Tameside Metropolitan Borough Council; 2018–2022	Succeeded by Ged Cooney
