= Eleanor Wills =

British politician

Cllr Eleanor Wills

Leader of Tameside Metropolitan Borough Council
- Incumbent
- Assumed office 24 October 2024
- Preceded by: Gerald Cooney

Member of the Greater Manchester Combined Authority
- Incumbent
- Assumed office October 2024
- Preceded by: Gerald Cooney

Member of Tameside Metropolitan Borough Council for Dukinfield / Stalybridge (ward)
- Incumbent
- Assumed office 22 May 2014

Personal details
- Party: Labour

Eleanor Wills (née Ballagher) is a British Labour politician and leader of Tameside Metropolitan Borough Council in Greater Manchester. As leader she is also a member of the Greater Manchester Combined Authority, and since the election of Bev Craig as the Mayor of Greater Manchester has been made the combined authority's portfolio lead for Anti-poverty, Equalities and Communities. She was previously held the GMCA portfolio for Greater Manchester Pensions, Fund Investments and Bee Network Pensions.

Prior to becoming leader, she was the council's Executive Member for Population Health and Wellbeing.

First elected to the council in 2014, Wills is the councillor for Dukinfield / Stalybridge. She was elected as council leader on 24 October 2024, following a crisis that resulted in the resignation of the former council leader and the council's head of paid service.

Since being elected Leader in 2024, Tameside has seen a renewed focus on regeneration with the launch of the Ashton Mayoral Development Zone and a new Mayoral Development Corporation for the towns of Ashton-under-Lyne and Stalybridge, focussing on transport-led regeneration.

Eleanor is professionally qualified in counselling and sits as a Governor on the Council of the Tameside and Glossop Integrated Care NHS Foundation Trust .

== Elections contested ==
=== Tameside Metropolitan Borough Council elections ===
Year	Ward	Party	Votes	% votes	Position	Ref.
2007	Stalybridge South	Labour	742	28.7	2nd of 4	
2014	Dukinfield / Stalybridge	Labour	1,194	40.89	Won	
2018	Dukinfield / Stalybridge	Labour	1,146	44.1	Won	
2022	Dukinfield / Stalybridge	Labour	1,256	46.3	Won	
2023	Dukinfield / Stalybridge	Labour	1,189	18.0	Elected	
2024	Dukinfield / Stalybridge	Labour	1,205	48.0	Won	

Political offices
Preceded by Gerald Cooney	Leader of Tameside Metropolitan Borough Council; 2024-	Incumbent
