= Antony Higginbotham =

British Conservative politician (born 1989)

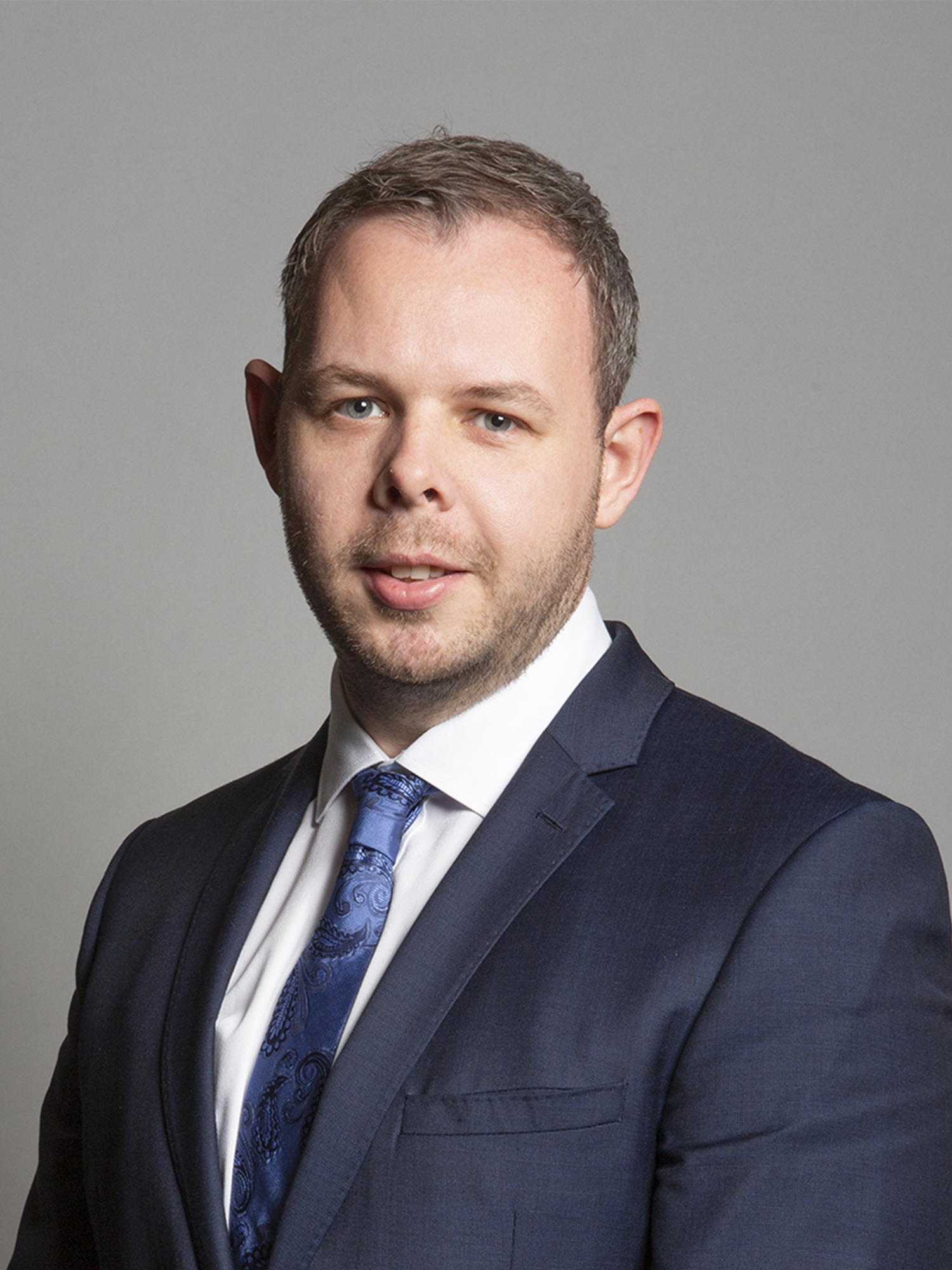
- Official portrait, 2019

Member of Parliament for Burnley
- In office 12 December 2019 – 30 May 2024
- Preceded by: Julie Cooper
- Succeeded by: Oliver Ryan

Personal details
- Born: 16 December 1989 (age 36) Haslingden, Lancashire, England
- Party: Conservative
- Education: Haslingden High School; University of Hull; City Law School
- Website: www.antonyhig.co.uk

Antony Higginbotham (born 16 December 1989) is a British Conservative politician who served as the Member of Parliament (MP) for Burnley from 2019 to 2024.

== Early life and career ==
Antony Higginbotham was born on 16 December 1989 in Haslingden. He attended Haslingden High School and went on to study politics at Hull University, becoming the first in his family to attend university.

After graduating, he briefly worked for the NHS. He then went on to complete a Graduate Diploma in Law at City Law School. Before becoming an MP, he worked for a trade organisation representing international banks. He then worked as a banker, first for a Japanese bank then as a banker at NatWest.

While living in London, he unsuccessfully contested the Peninsula ward in the 2018 Greenwich London Borough Council election.

== Parliamentary career ==
At the 2019 general election, Higginbotham was elected to Parliament as MP for Burnley with 40.3% of the vote and a majority of 1,352, becoming the first Conservative MP in Burnley since 1910.

In June 2021, Higginbotham and Burnley Council submitted a bid for £20m to improve constituency life through three construction projects.

He is a member of the Armed Forces Parliamentary Scheme, which includes 12 months of courses on military affairs to help improve parliamentary knowledge on the military.

Higginbotham endorsed Liz Truss during the July–September 2022 Conservative Party leadership election, citing her views on tax, education and 'levelling up'.

In June 2024, Higginbotham was re-selected as the Conservative candidate for Burnley at the 2024 general election. He lost his seat to Labour candidate, Oliver Ryan.

== Post-parliamentary career ==
Following his defeat at the 2024 election, Higginbothan founded the public affairs consultancy Polaris Partners, where he continues to work as Managing Partner.

== Personal life ==
Higginbotham is openly gay and was one of 20 LGBT+ Conservative MPs in the 2019–2024 Parliament.

Parliament of the United Kingdom
Preceded by Julie Cooper	Member of Parliament for Burnley; 2019–present	Incumbent
