= 2023 Tameside Metropolitan Borough Council election =

2023 local government election in Tameside

- 4 May 2023

All 57 seats on Tameside Metropolitan Borough Council 29 seats needed for a majority

	First party	Second party	Third party
Leader	Gerald Cooney	Doreen Dickinson	Alan Huntbach
Party	Labour	Conservative	Green
Seats before	48	8	1
Seats won	51	6	0
Seat change	▲3	▼2	▼1
Popular vote	71,400	26,685	10,865
Percentage	63.4%	23.7%	9.6%
Swing	▲8.8%	▼12.6%	▲0.9%
- Winner of each seat at the 2023 Tameside Metropolitan Borough Council election
Leader before election
Gerald Cooney
Labour
Leader after election
Gerald Cooney
Labour

The 2023 Tameside Metropolitan Borough Council elections took place on 4 May 2023 alongside other local elections in the United Kingdom. Due to boundary changes, all 57 seats on Tameside Metropolitan Borough Council were contested.

Labour retained its majority on the council.

== Background ==
The Local Government Act 1972 created a two-tier system of metropolitan counties and districts covering Greater Manchester, Merseyside, South Yorkshire, Tyne and Wear, the West Midlands, and West Yorkshire starting in 1974. Tameside was a district of the Greater Manchester metropolitan county. The Local Government Act 1985 abolished the metropolitan counties, with metropolitan districts taking on most of their powers as metropolitan boroughs. The Greater Manchester Combined Authority was created in 2011 and began electing the mayor of Greater Manchester from 2017, which was given strategic powers covering a region coterminous with the former Greater Manchester metropolitan county.

Since its creation in 1974, Tameside has always been under Labour control, aside from 1978 to 1982 when the Conservatives held a majority.

In June 2022 the Local Government Boundary Commission for England made The Tameside (Electoral Changes) Order 2022, which officially abolished the existing 19 wards and created 19 new wards with different boundaries. Because of this change, all 57 seats on the council, three per ward, were to be contested.

== Electoral process ==
The election took place using the plurality block voting system, a form of first-past-the-post voting, with each ward being represented by three councillors. The candidate with the most votes in each ward will serve a four-year term ending in 2027, the second-placed candidate will serve a three-year term anding in 2026 and the third-placed candidate will serve a one-year term ending in 2024.

All registered electors (British, Irish, Commonwealth and European Union citizens) living in Oldham aged 18 or over were entitled to vote in the election. People who lived at two addresses in different councils, such as university students with different term-time and holiday addresses, were entitled to be registered for and vote in elections in both local authorities. Voting in-person at polling stations took place from 07:00 to 22:00 on election day, and voters were able to apply for postal votes or proxy votes in advance of the election.

== Previous council composition ==
After 2022 election		Before 2023 election	
Party	Seats	Party	Seats
Labour	50	Labour	48
Conservative	6	Conservative	8
Green	1	Green	1

== Results ==
Tameside Metropolitan Borough Council's composition following the 2023 election.

2023 Tameside Metropolitan Borough Council election
Party	Seats	Net gain/loss	Seats %	Votes %	Votes	+/−
Labour	51	3 ▲	89.5	63.4	71,400	
Conservative	6	2 ▼	10.5	23.7	26,685	
Green	0	1 ▼	0.0	9.6	10,865	
Independent	0	0	0.0	1.8	2,078	
Liberal Democrats	0	0	0.0	0.8	909	
Women's Equality	0	0	0.0	0.4	462	
Monster Raving Loony	0	0	0.0	0.2	244	

=== Ashton Hurst ===
Ashton Hurst (3)
Party	Candidate	Votes	%	±%
Labour	Mike Glover	1,307	49.7	
Conservative	Dan Costello	1,232	46.8	
Labour	Mohammed Karim	1,052	40.0	
Labour	Dolores Lewis	1,046	39.8	
Conservative	Lucy Turner	980	37.3	
Green	Hilary Jones	551	21.0	
Rejected ballots		10		
Turnout		2,630	30.9	
Registered electors		8,521		
Labour win (new boundaries)				
Conservative win (new boundaries)				
Labour win (new boundaries)				

=== Ashton St Michael's ===
Ashton St Michael's (3)
Party	Candidate	Votes	%	±%
Labour	Andrew McLaren	1,323	60.4	
Labour	Bill Fairfoull	1,247	56.9	
Labour	Jean Drennan	1,184	54.1	
Conservative	Victoria Golas	557	25.4	
Green	Jenny Ross	446	20.4	
Liberal Democrats	John Bartley	373	17.0	
Rejected ballots		12		
Turnout		2,190	24.1	
Registered electors		9,106		
Labour win (new boundaries)				
Labour win (new boundaries)				
Labour win (new boundaries)				

=== Ashton Waterloo ===
Ashton Waterloo (3)
Party	Candidate	Votes	%	±%
Labour	Vimal Choksi	1,343	51.7	
Labour	Dave Howarth	1,185	45.6	
Labour	Sangita Patel	1,179	45.4	
Green	Christine Clark	864	33.3	
Green	Lee Huntbach	810	31.2	
Green	Trevor Clarke	759	29.2	
Conservative	Matt Allen	392	15.1	
Rejected ballots		10		
Turnout		2,598	28.5	
Registered electors		9,110		
Labour win (new boundaries)				
Labour win (new boundaries)				
Labour win (new boundaries)				

=== Audenshaw ===
Audenshaw (3)
Party	Candidate	Votes	%	±%
Labour	Charlotte Martin	1,574	57.0	
Labour	Nick Axford	1,493	54.1	
Labour	Teresa Smith	1,344	48.7	
Conservative	Danny Mather	1,079	39.1	
Green	Luke Robinson	490	17.8	
Rejected ballots		13		
Turnout		2,760	29.3	
Registered electors		9,428		
Labour win (new boundaries)				
Labour win (new boundaries)				
Labour win (new boundaries)				

=== Denton North East ===
Denton North East (3)
Party	Candidate	Votes	%	±%
Labour	Allison Gwynne	1,341	65.2	
Labour	Denise Ward	1,106	53.8	
Labour	Vincent Ricci	1,021	49.7	
Conservative	Dawn Cobb	578	28.1	
Green	John Bradley	394	19.2	
Rejected ballots		15		
Turnout		2,056	24.2	
Registered electors		8,487		
Labour win (new boundaries)				
Labour win (new boundaries)				
Labour win (new boundaries)				

=== Denton South ===
Denton South (3)
Party	Candidate	Votes	%	±%
Labour	George Newton	1,517	63.7	
Labour	Claire Reid	1,502	63.1	
Labour	Jack Naylor	1,398	58.7	
Conservative	Timothy Cho	666	28.0	
Green	Bethany Gartside	366	15.4	
Monster Raving Loony	Farmin Lord F'Tang F'Tang Dave	244	10.2	
Rejected ballots		4		
Turnout		2,381	27.7	
Registered electors		8,605		
Labour win (new boundaries)				
Labour win (new boundaries)				
Labour win (new boundaries)				

=== Denton West ===
Denton West (3)
Party	Candidate	Votes	%	±%
Labour	George Jones	1,928	71.0	
Labour	Brenda Warrington	1,714	63.1	
Labour	Mike Smith	1,591	58.6	
Conservative	Tom Dunne	607	22.4	
Green	Christopher Parr	518	19.1	
Rejected ballots		13		
Turnout		2,715	29.9	
Registered electors		9,087		
Labour win (new boundaries)				
Labour win (new boundaries)				
Labour win (new boundaries)				

=== Droylsden East ===
Droylsden East (3)
Party	Candidate	Votes	%	±%
Labour	David Mills	1,071	51.3	
Labour	Susan Quinn	1,051	50.4	
Labour	Laura Boyle	1,021	48.9	
Conservative	Matt Stevenson	548	26.3	
Green	Louise Axon	451	21.6	
Liberal Democrats	Rowan Fitton	358	17.2	
Rejected ballots		14		
Turnout		2,086	24.6	
Registered electors		8,496		
Labour win (new boundaries)				
Labour win (new boundaries)				
Labour win (new boundaries)				

=== Droylsden West ===
Droylsden West (3)
Party	Candidate	Votes	%	±%
Labour	Ged Cooney	1,304	62.0	
Labour	Ann Holland	1,188	56.5	
Labour	Barrie Holland	1,077	51.2	
Green	Nicola Harrop	506	24.1	
Conservative	James Wexler	499	23.7	
Rejected ballots		7		
Turnout		2,102	24.3	
Registered electors		8,651		
Labour win (new boundaries)				
Labour win (new boundaries)				
Labour win (new boundaries)				

=== Dukinfield ===
Dukinfield (3)
Party	Candidate	Votes	%	±%
Labour	Jackie Lane	1,222	58.9	
Labour	John Taylor	1,187	57.2	
Labour	Naila Sharif	1,105	53.3	
Conservative	David Rose	579	27.9	
Green	Julie Wood	544	26.2	
Rejected ballots		14		
Turnout		2,074	22.7	
Registered electors		9,137		
Labour win (new boundaries)				
Labour win (new boundaries)				
Labour win (new boundaries)				

=== Dukinfield Stalybridge ===
Dukinfield Stalybridge (3)
Party	Candidate	Votes	%	±%
Labour	Leanne Feeley	1,243	47.4	
Labour	David Sweeton	1,229	46.9	
Labour	Eleanor Wills	1,189	45.3	
Conservative	Kurt McPartland	997	38.0	
Conservative	David Dawson	831	31.7	
Conservative	Malcolm Smith	728	27.8	
Green	Linda Freeman	424	16.2	
Rejected ballots		16		
Turnout		2,622	29.8	
Registered electors		8,808		
Labour win (new boundaries)				
Labour win (new boundaries)				
Labour win (new boundaries)				

=== Hyde Godley ===
Hyde Godley (3)
Party	Candidate	Votes	%	±%
Labour Co-op	Joe Kitchen	1,278	48.9	
Labour Co-op	Betty Affleck	1,273	48.7	
Conservative	Andrea Colbourne	1,139	43.6	
Labour Co-op	David McAllister	1,139	43.6	
Conservative	Melissa Molloy	843	32.3	
Conservative	Ali Reza	790	30.2	
Green	Zebedee Powell	335	12.8	
Rejected ballots		11		
Turnout		2,613	30.8	
Registered electors		8,492		
Labour Co-op win (new boundaries)				
Labour Co-op win (new boundaries)				
Conservative win (new boundaries)				

Third place was decided by the returning officer drawing lots to break the tie between Andrea Colbourne and David McAllister.

=== Hyde Newton ===
Hyde Newton (3)
Party	Candidate	Votes	%	±%
Labour Co-op	Helen Bowden	1,175	58.7	
Labour Co-op	Peter Robinson	1,137	56.8	
Labour Co-op	Hugh Roderick	929	46.4	
Conservative	Carl Edwards	539	26.9	
Conservative	Wendy Ince	458	22.9	
Liberal Democrats	Peter Ball-Foster	378	18.9	
Green	Emma Powell	366	18.3	
Rejected ballots		4		
Turnout		2,002	22.3	
Registered electors		8,993		
Labour Co-op win (new boundaries)				
Labour Co-op win (new boundaries)				
Labour Co-op win (new boundaries)				

=== Hyde Werneth ===
Hyde Werneth (3)
Party	Candidate	Votes	%	±%
Conservative	Phil Chadwick	1,665	47.0	
Labour Co-op	Shibley Alam	1,608	45.4	
Labour Co-op	Jim Fitzpatrick	1,530	43.2	
Conservative	Ruth Welsh	1,456	41.1	
Labour Co-op	Muhammad Rahman	1,352	38.2	
Conservative	Paul Molloy	1,324	37.4	
Green	Alex Cooper	470	13.3	
Rejected ballots		7		
Turnout		3,539	38.1	
Registered electors		9,293		
Conservative win (new boundaries)				
Labour Co-op win (new boundaries)				
Labour Co-op win (new boundaries)				

=== Longendale ===
Longendale (3)
Party	Candidate	Votes	%	±%
Labour	Jacqueline North	1,429	61.2	
Labour	Gary Ferguson	1,344	57.5	
Labour	Jacqueline Owen	1,201	51.4	
Green	Doris Breierley	642	27.5	
Conservative	Leslie Browning	586	25.1	
Conservative	Cameron Robertson	558	23.9	
Rejected ballots		12		
Turnout		2,336	24.5	
Registered electors		9,530		
Labour win (new boundaries)				
Labour win (new boundaries)				
Labour win (new boundaries)				

=== Mossley ===
Mossley (3)
Party	Candidate	Votes	%	±%
Labour	Jack Homer	1,466	55.9	
Labour	Taf Sharif	1,334	50.9	
Labour	Steve Homer	1,259	48.0	
Green	Dermot Gill	716	27.3	
Independent	Dean Aylett	698	26.6	
Conservative	Andrew Hay	595	22.7	
Women's Equality	Hattie Thomas	462	17.6	
Rejected ballots		10		
Turnout		2,621	30.1	
Registered electors		8,700		
Labour win (new boundaries)				
Labour win (new boundaries)				
Labour win (new boundaries)				

=== St Peter's ===
St Peter's (3)
Party	Candidate	Votes	%	±%
Labour	Joyce Bowerman	1,507	64.7	
Labour	Warren Bray	1,232	52.9	
Labour	David McNally	1,002	43.0	
Independent	Iftikhar Ahmad	532	18.5	
Conservative	Shazad Azam	524	22.5	
Green	Sarah Whiteley	375	16.1	
Rejected ballots		7		
Turnout		2,330	25.7	
Registered electors		9,081		
Labour win (new boundaries)				
Labour win (new boundaries)				
Labour win (new boundaries)				

=== Stalybridge North ===
Stalybridge North (3)
Party	Candidate	Votes	%	±%
Labour	Christine Beardmore	1,057	42.4	
Labour	Adrian Pearce	992	39.8	
Labour	Jan Jackson	956	38.3	
Independent	Steven Barton	848	34.0	
Conservative	Clive Patrick	643	25.8	
Conservative	Lisa Tilbrook	590	23.6	
Conservative	Ky Marland	509	20.4	
Green	Alice Mason-Power	402	16.1	
Rejected ballots		12		
Turnout		2,495	26.9	
Registered electors		9,285		
Labour win (new boundaries)				
Labour win (new boundaries)				
Labour win (new boundaries)				

=== Stalybridge South ===
Stalybridge South (3)
Party	Candidate	Votes	%	±%
Conservative	Doreen Dickinson	1,494	54.4	
Conservative	Liam Billington	1,402	51.1	
Conservative	David Tilbrook	1,297	47.3	
Labour	Francesca Coates	1,098	40.0	
Labour	Katy Flanagan	951	34.7	
Labour	Stuart McKenzie	869	31.7	
Green	Amanda Hickling	436	15.9	
Rejected ballots		18		
Turnout		2,744	30.1	
Registered electors		9,102		
Conservative win (new boundaries)				
Conservative win (new boundaries)				
Conservative win (new boundaries)				
