= Denton Urban District =

Former local government area in the UK

Coordinates: 53°27′N 2°07′W

Denton
- Area
  - 1894: 2,594 acres (10.50 km^{2})
  - 1974: 2,594 acres (10.50 km^{2})
- Population
  - 1901: 14,934
  - 1971: 38,170
- History
  - Created: 1894
  - Abolished: 1974
  - Succeeded by: Tameside
- Status: Urban district

Denton Urban District was a local government district in England from 1894 to 1974.

Denton was originally a township in the ancient parish of Manchester in the Salford Hundred of Lancashire. In 1866 it became a civil parish in its own right. The Denton parish was expanded on 31 December 1894 by gaining the former area of Haughton;. The Local Government Act 1894 created the urban district of Denton in the administrative county of Lancashire which consisted of the whole of the enlarged civil parish. There were minor boundary changes in 1933 and 1937 with the Manchester and Stockport county boroughs which did not affect any population.

In 1974, under the Local Government Act 1972, the assets and area of the district were transferred to the newly created metropolitan borough of Tameside.
