= John Warrington (producer) =

British TV producer (born 1962)

John Warrington (born 1962 in London), is a TV producer and director specialising in live sports production and sports documentaries. He also presented a number of sports programmes including the Masters Football highlights show for Channel 4. Perhaps his best known documentary film is Hatton Mayweather: The Full Story, which was released in 2008. In 2021, he founded sports documentary platform 360 Sports TV along with former England international footballer, Tony Woodcock, which in February 2022 announced it was rebooting Masters Football after an 11-year absence. He also produced and directed the first 360 Sports TV original film, The Burmese Python, about boxer Nicola Barke, which was released in 2021.
