= Tameside Metropolitan Borough Council =

Local government body in England

- Coat of arms

- Corporate logo

Type
- Type: Metropolitan borough council

History
- Founded: 1 April 1974

Leadership
- Civic Mayor: Helen Bowden, Labour since 26 May 2026
- Executive Leader: Eleanor Wills, Labour since 24 October 2024
- Chief Executive: Emma Alexander since November 2025

Structure
- Seats: 57 councillors
- Graph of the party split among 57 seats.
- Political groups: Administration (25) Labour (25) Other parties (32) Reform (19) Conservative (5) Independent (8)
- Joint committees: Greater Manchester Combined Authority; Greater Manchester Police, Fire and Crime Panel; Greater Manchester Integrated Care Board; Bee Network Committee
- Length of term: 4 years

Elections
- Voting system: First-past-the-post
- Last election: 7 May 2026
- Next election: 6 May 2027

Meeting place
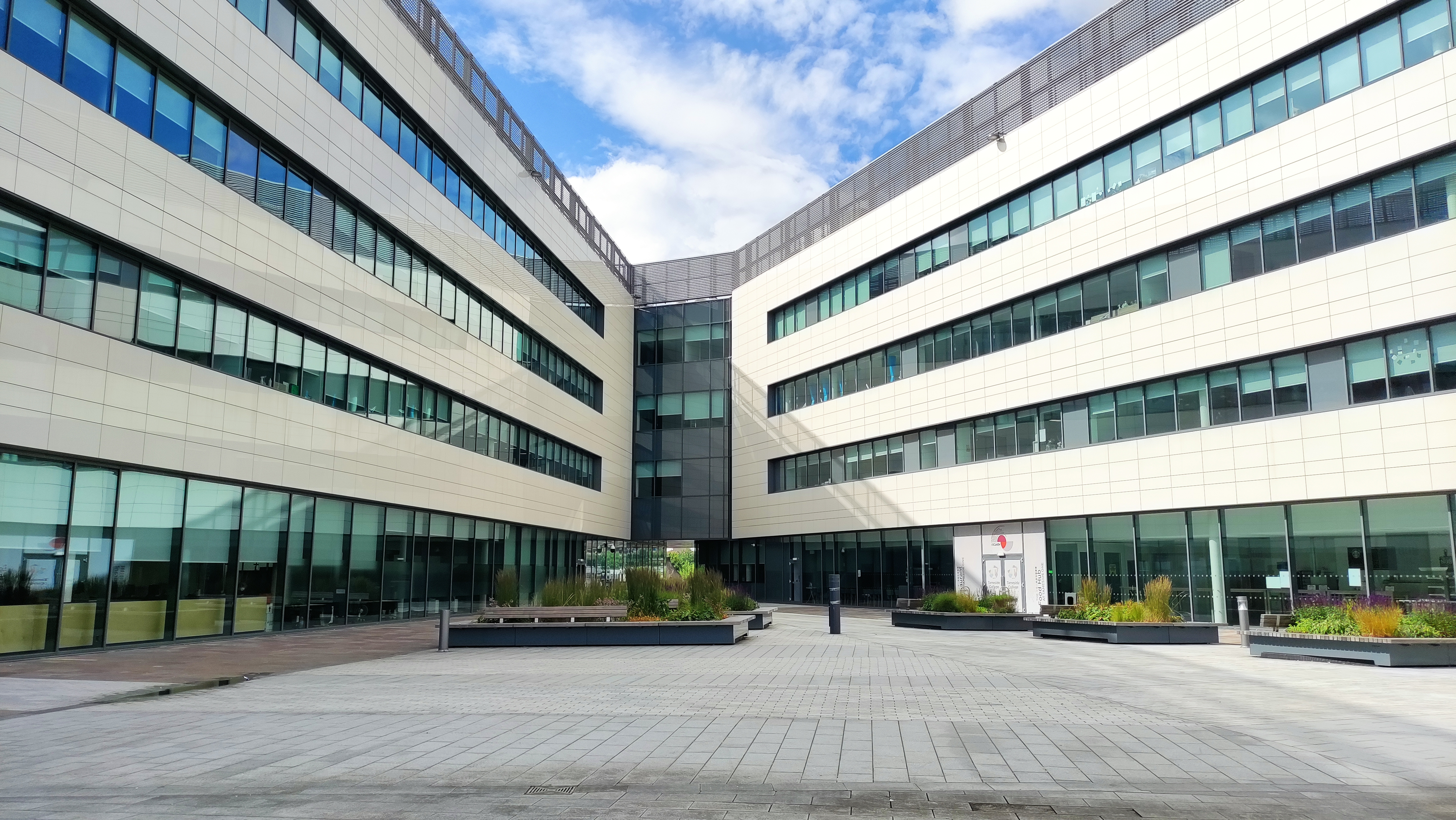
- Tameside One, Market Square, Ashton-under-Lyne, OL6 6BH

Website
- www.tameside.gov.uk

Tameside Metropolitan Borough Council, also known as Tameside Council, is the local authority of the Metropolitan Borough of Tameside in Greater Manchester, England. It is a metropolitan borough council and provides the majority of local government services in the borough. The council has been a member of the Greater Manchester Combined Authority since 2011.

The council has been under no overall control since the 2026 election, having previously been under Labour majority control since 1979. It is based at Tameside One in Ashton-under-Lyne.

== History ==
The Metropolitan Borough of Tameside and its council were created in 1974 under the Local Government Act 1972 as one of ten metropolitan districts within the new metropolitan county of Greater Manchester. The first election was held in 1973. For its first year the council acted as a shadow authority alongside the area's nine outgoing authorities, being the borough councils of Ashton-under-Lyne, Dukinfield, Hyde, Mossley and Stalybridge, and the urban district councils of Audenshaw, Denton, Droylsden and Longdendale. The new metropolitan district and its council formally came into being on 1 April 1974, at which point the old districts and their councils were abolished.

The metropolitan district was awarded borough status from its creation, allowing the chair of the council to take the title of mayor.

From 1974 until 1986 the council was a lower-tier authority, with upper-tier functions provided by the Greater Manchester County Council. The county council was abolished in 1986 and its functions passed to Greater Manchester's ten borough councils, including Tameside, with some services provided through joint committees.

Since 2011 the council has been a member of the Greater Manchester Combined Authority, which has been led by the directly elected Mayor of Greater Manchester since 2017. The combined authority provides strategic leadership and co-ordination for certain functions across Greater Manchester, notably regarding transport and town planning, but Tameside Metropolitan Borough Council continues to be responsible for most local government functions.

The council was documented in the 2014 BBC Television series Call the Council, which showed its workers carrying out their duties.

In 2025 the contents of a WhatsApp group called ‘Trigger Me Timbers’ including the Gorton and Denton MP Andrew Gwynne, the MP for Burnley, Oliver Ryan, Labour party activists and Tameside councillors became public, revealing racist, anti-Semitic and sexist remarks. Following the Labour Party investigation, numerous councillors were suspended or resigned from the party. In 2026 Tameside Labour was accused of planting fake Independent candidates to split the votes for opposition parties. In October 2026 ITV broadcast an ivestigation called "Undercover: A Year In Reform" which showed Reform UK councillors and candidates making overtly racist, sexist and violent remarks. Councillor Raymond Dunning resigned from the party.

== Tameside duty of inquiry ==
A legal principle known as the Tameside duty of inquiry derives its name from the 1976 judgement by the House of Lords in the case of Secretary of State for Education and Science v Tameside MBC. It is "commonly described as a duty to make sufficient or due inquiry".

...the duty requires the decision-maker to have "(asked) himself the right question and take reasonable steps to acquaint himself with the relevant information to enable him to answer it correctly" - Lord Diplock

== Governance ==
The council provides metropolitan borough services. Some strategic functions in the area are provided by the Greater Manchester Combined Authority; the leader of Tameside Council sits on the combined authority as Tameside's representative. There is one civil parish in the borough at Mossley, which forms an additional tier of local government for that area; the rest of the borough is unparished.

=== Political control ===
The council has been under Labour majority control since 1979.

Political control of the council since the 1974 reforms took effect has been as follows:

Party in control	Years
Labour	1974–1976
Conservative	1976–1979
Labour	1979–present

=== Leadership ===
The council splits the functions usually exercised by a mayor into two roles: a 'civic mayor' who acts as a ceremonial figurehead and represents the council at civic functions, and a 'chair of council business' who presides at council meetings. Political leadership is provided by the leader of the council, now also called the 'executive leader'. The leaders since 1974 have been:

Councillor	Party	From	To
Percy Travis	Labour	1 Apr 1974	May 1976
Colin Grantham	Conservative	May 1976	May 1979
George Newton	Labour	May 1979	May 1980
Roy Oldham	Labour	May 1980	25 May 2010
Kieran Quinn	Labour	25 May 2010	25 Dec 2017
Brenda Warrington	Labour	31 Jan 2018	16 May 2022
Ged Cooney	Labour	24 May 2022	10 Oct 2024
Eleanor Wills	Labour	24 Oct 2024	incumbent

=== Composition ===
Following the 2026 election, the composition of the council was:

Party	Councillors
Labour	25
Reform	19
Conservative	5
Independent	8
Total	57

Four of the independent councillors sit together as the "Independent Group". The next election is due in May 2027.

== Elections ==
Since the last boundary changes in 2023, the council has comprised 57 councillors representing 19 wards, with each ward electing three councillors. Elections are held three years out of every four, with a third of the council (one councillor for each ward) elected each time for a four-year term of office.

== Premises ==
The council has its headquarters at Tameside One, which also includes a library and part of Tameside College. The building was completed in 2019.

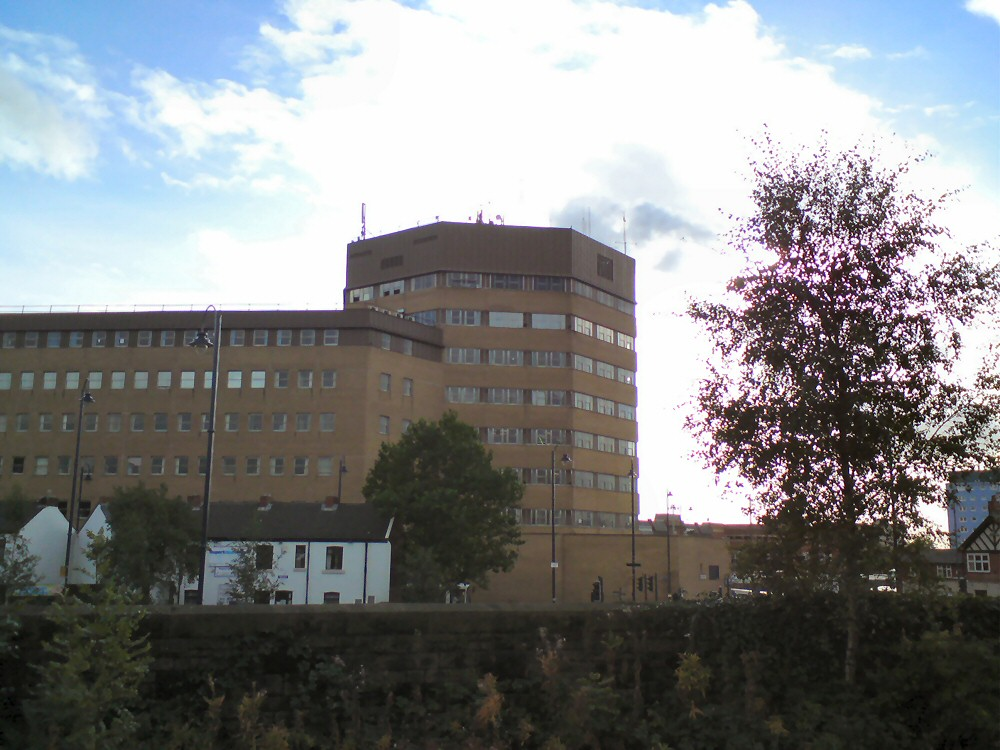
Former council offices at Ashton-under-Lyne, demolished to make way for current 'Tameside One' headquarters

The council's former offices, known as the Tameside Administrative Centre, had been built on the same site in 1981. That building was demolished in 2016 to make way for Tameside One. The site is immediately behind Ashton Town Hall, one of the buildings inherited from the council's predecessors.

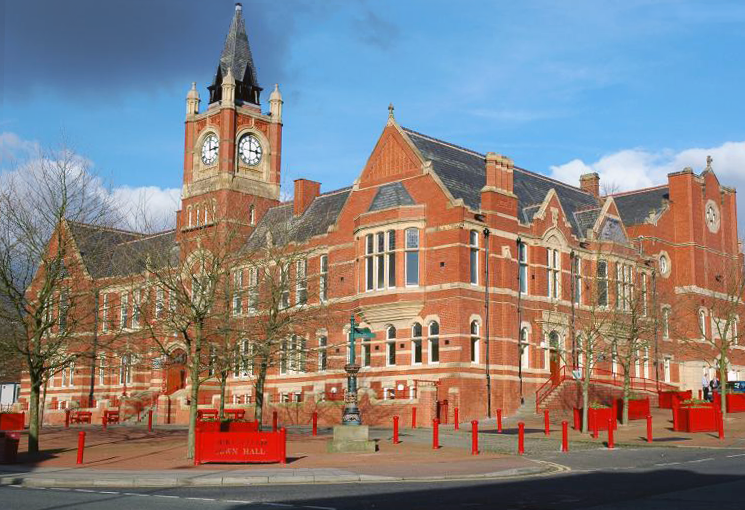
Dukinfield Town Hall, used for the council's annual meetings when mayors are appointed

The annual council meeting when new civic mayors are appointed is usually held at Dukinfield Town Hall.

== Coat of arms ==
Coat of arms of Tameside Metropolitan Borough Council
Crest Out of a mural crown Gules a demi-lion guardant Or resting the sinister forepaw on an escutcheon of the arms, mantled Gules doubled Or. Escutcheon Per bend Or and Vert a bend barry wavy Argent and Azure between in chief a rose Gules barbed and seeded Proper and in base a Garb Or. Supporters On the dexter a lion Or gorged with a chain pendent therefrom a mullet pierced Sable and on the sinister a male griffin Gules armed, beaked, irradiated and gorged with a chain pendent therefrom a cogwheel Or. Motto 'Industry And Integrity'

Awards and achievements
Preceded by Glasgow	LBC Council of the Year; 2016	Succeeded by Sevenoaks
