= 1990 Trafford Metropolitan Borough Council election =

1990 UK local government election

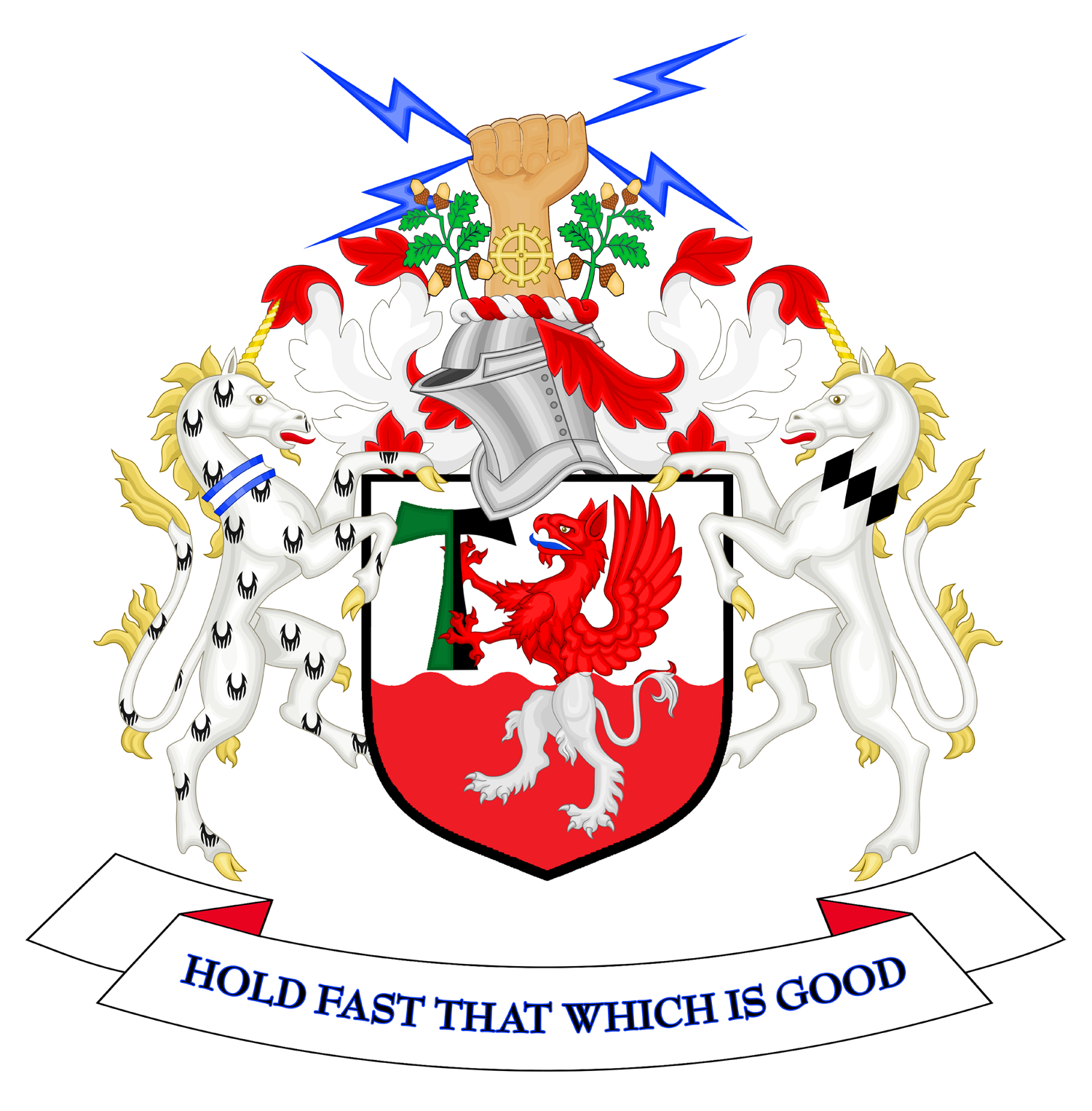
- 4 May 1990

24 of 63 seats to Trafford Metropolitan Borough Council 32 seats needed for a majority
	First party	Second party	Third party
Leader	Colin Warbrick	Barry Brotherton	Ray Bowker
Party	Conservative	Labour	Liberal Democrats
Leader's seat	Urmston	Sale Moor	Village
Last election	13 seats, 48.9%	8 seats, 36.0%	1 seats, 14.5%
Seats before	32	26	4
Seats won	13	10	0
Seats after	37	24	1
Seat change	▲5	▼2	▼3
Popular vote	43,193	37,507	8,728
Percentage	45.3%	39.4%	9.2%
Swing	▼3.6%	▲3.4%	▼5.3%
	Fourth party
Leader	Frank Holland
Party	Partington Democratic Labour
Leader's seat	Bucklow
Last election	N/A
Seats before	1
Seats won	1
Seats after	1
Seat change	0
Popular vote	1,658
Percentage	1.7%
Swing	N/A
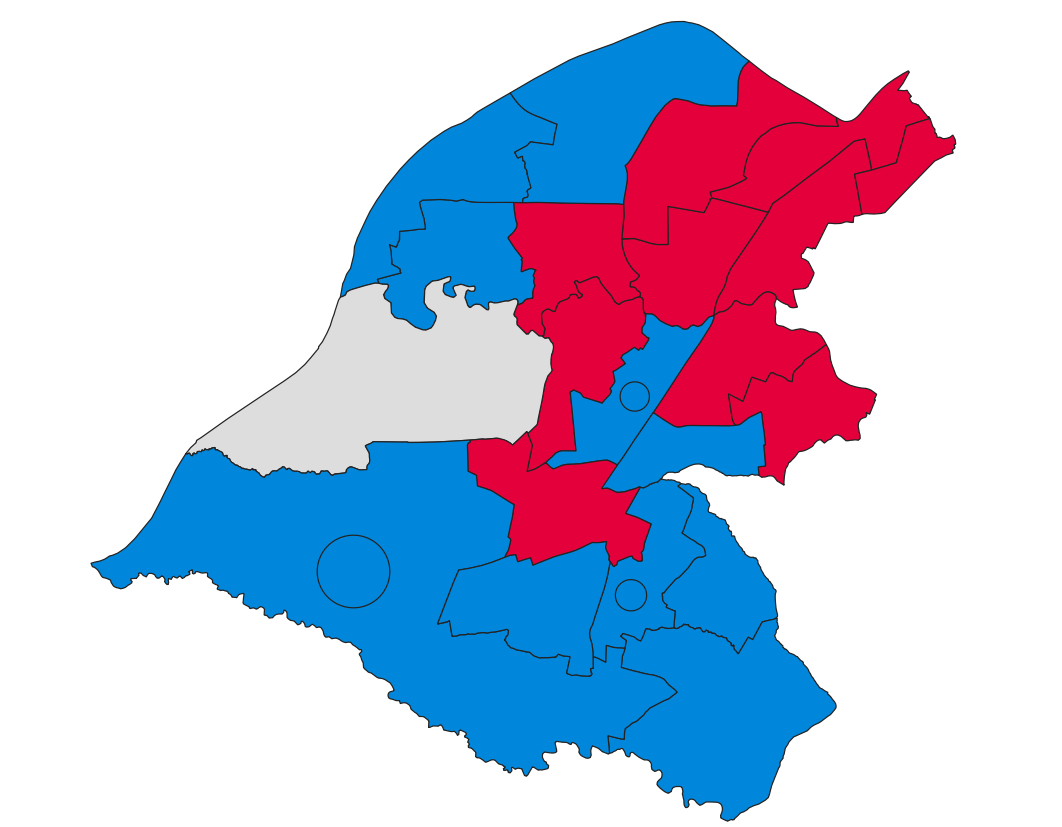
- Map of results of 1990 election
Leader of the Council before election
Colin Warbrick
Conservative
Leader of the Council after election
Colin Warbrick
Conservative

Elections to Trafford Council were held on 4 May 1990. One-third of the council was up for election, with each successful candidate to serve a four-year term of office, expiring in 1994. The Conservative party retained overall control of the council.

== Election result ==
Party	Votes		Seats			Full Council	
Conservative Party	43,193 (45.3%)	▼3.6	13 (54.2%)	13 / 24	▲5	37 (58.7%)	37 / 63
Labour Party	37,507 (39.4%)	▲3.4	10 (41.7%)	10 / 24	▼2	24 (38.1%)	24 / 63
Liberal Democrats	8,728 (9.2%)	▼5.3	0 (0.0%)	0 / 24	▼3	1 (1.6%)	1 / 63
Independent	1,658 (1.7%)	N/A	1 (4.2%)	1 / 24	Steady	1 (1.6%)	1 / 63
Green Party	4,220 (4.4%)	▲3.8	0 (0.0%)	0 / 24	Steady	0 (0.0%)	0 / 63

↓
24	1	1	37

== Ward results ==
=== Altrincham ===
Altrincham
Party	Candidate	Votes	%	±%
Conservative	E. K. Adams	1,876	44.6	−4.4
Labour	F. W. Bamford	1,818	43.3	+4.9
Liberal Democrats	J. B. Weightman	267	6.4	−6.2
Green	M. R. Rowtham	241	5.7	+5.7
Majority		58	1.4	−9.2
Turnout		4,202	50.0	+3.4
Conservative gain from Labour		Swing		

=== Bowdon ===
Bowdon (2 vacancies)
Party	Candidate	Votes	%	±%
Conservative	M. C. Harney*	2,671	63.7	−7.1
Conservative	S. Poole	2,561	61.1	−9.7
Labour	H. F. Busteed	794	18.9	+6.9
Labour	S. Hinder	679	16.2	+4.2
Liberal Democrats	G. P. Pawson	492	11.7	−1.9
Green	B. J. Edwards	401	9.6	+6.1
Liberal Democrats	J. Preston	394	9.4	−3.8
Majority		1,767	42.1	−15.2
Turnout		4,194	48.4	+5.4
Conservative hold		Swing		
Conservative hold		Swing		

=== Broadheath ===
Broadheath
Party	Candidate	Votes	%	±%
Labour	J. E. Baugh	1,908	44.7	+8.0
Conservative	A. Rhodes	1,754	41.1	−10.8
Liberal Democrats	S. J. Chapman	391	9.2	−2.2
Green	M. Fielding	212	5.0	+5.0
Majority		154	3.6	−11.6
Turnout		4,265	48.0	+1.7
Labour hold		Swing		

=== Brooklands ===
Brooklands
Party	Candidate	Votes	%	±%
Conservative	J. Chesney	2,467	60.5	−8.5
Labour	W. Stennett	813	19.9	+5.0
Liberal Democrats	K. F. Humber	590	14.5	−1.6
Green	R. I. Unsworth	209	5.1	+5.1
Majority		1,654	40.5	−10.3
Turnout		4,079	50.3	+2.2
Conservative hold		Swing		

=== Bucklow ===
Bucklow
Party	Candidate	Votes	%	±%
Independent	F. Holland*	1,658	56.5	+56.5
Labour	P. Miller	749	25.5	−54.0
Conservative	B. J. Shannon	348	11.9	+11.9
Green	A. Miller	180	6.1	+6.1
Majority		909	31.0	−28.0
Turnout		2,935	45.0	+17.7
Independent hold		Swing		

=== Clifford ===
Clifford
Party	Candidate	Votes	%	±%
Labour	M. E. Atherton	2,474	77.7	+2.9
Conservative	M. T. Wyne	709	22.3	−2.9
Majority		1,765	55.5	+5.8
Turnout		3,183	39.6	+1.8
Labour hold		Swing		

=== Davyhulme East ===
Davyhulme East
Party	Candidate	Votes	%	±%
Conservative	R. G. Haigh*	2,138	52.3	−9.2
Labour	G. Smethurst	1,702	41.6	+11.8
Green	A. E. Peplow	248	6.1	+6.1
Majority		436	10.7	−21.0
Turnout		4,088	53.2	+9.1
Conservative hold		Swing		

=== Davyhulme West ===
Davyhulme West
Party	Candidate	Votes	%	±%
Conservative	M. Bates	2,033	50.2	+0.1
Labour	A. G. Hodson*	2,015	49.8	+6.8
Majority		18	0.4	−6.7
Turnout		4,048	50.8	−0.7
Conservative gain from Labour		Swing		

=== Flixton ===
Flixton
Party	Candidate	Votes	%	±%
Conservative	T. R. Seddon	1,989	42.3	−2.3
Labour	J. Moore	1,625	34.6	+6.6
Liberal Democrats	A. Vernon	898	19.1	−8.4
Green	N. M. Smith	187	4.0	+4.0
Majority		364	7.7	−8.9
Turnout		4,699	59.8	+2.3
Conservative gain from Labour		Swing		

=== Hale ===
Hale
Party	Candidate	Votes	%	±%
Conservative	R. A. Roberts*	3,002	71.7	−4.7
Labour	R. E. Lucas	616	14.7	+6.5
Liberal Democrats	F. A. Cameron	376	9.0	−3.5
Green	H. A. Eadie	190	4.5	+1.6
Majority		2,386	57.0	−6.8
Turnout		4,184	48.0	+4.5
Conservative hold		Swing		

=== Longford ===
Longford
Party	Candidate	Votes	%	±%
Labour	J. P. Hagan*	2,015	54.5	−0.2
Conservative	S. M. Dirikis	1,436	38.9	−6.4
Green	J. D. Westbrook	245	6.6	+6.6
Majority		579	15.7	+6.4
Turnout		3,696	48.8	+1.4
Labour hold		Swing		

=== Mersey-St. Mary's ===
Mersey St. Marys (2 Councillors)
Party	Candidate	Votes	%	±%
Conservative	D. I. Carter*	2,820	55.9	−4.6
Conservative	B. Sharp	2,678	53.1	−7.4
Labour	B. D. Eckford	1,249	24.7	+1.1
Labour	L. M. Wright	1,190	23.6	0
Liberal Democrats	R. J. Thompson	513	10.2	−5.7
Green	A. M. Bowden	466	9.2	N/A
Majority		1,429	28.4	−8.6
Turnout		5,048	53.3	+8.3
Conservative hold		Swing		
Conservative hold		Swing		

=== Park ===
Park
Party	Candidate	Votes	%	±%
Labour	J. R. Haydock*	1,813	64.0	+6.3
Conservative	E. J. Kelson	1,022	36.0	+0.3
Majority		791	27.9	+5.9
Turnout		2,835	46.4	+3.1
Labour hold		Swing		

=== Priory ===
Priory
Party	Candidate	Votes	%	±%
Labour	P. W. Mitchell	1,324	33.9	+4.1
Liberal Democrats	E. Mitchell*	1,305	33.5	+1.6
Conservative	D. R. Baldwin	1,239	31.8	−6.4
Green	M. C. Peplow	160	4.1	+4.1
Majority		19	0.5	−5.8
Turnout		3,900	51.5	+5.7
Labour gain from Liberal Democrats		Swing		

=== Sale Moor ===
Sale Moor
Party	Candidate	Votes	%	±%
Labour	P. Gratrix	1,917	47.9	+1.1
Conservative	F. Leigh	1,544	38.6	−3.9
Liberal Democrats	K. Clarke	377	9.4	−1.3
Green	R. Dean	164	4.1	+4.1
Majority		373	9.3	+5.0
Turnout		4,002	50.8	+5.4
Labour hold		Swing		

=== St. Martin's ===
St. Martins
Party	Candidate	Votes	%	±%
Labour	L. T. Murkin*	2,613	60.3	+8.5
Conservative	J. Tolhurst	1,460	33.7	−3.9
Green	J. A. Bowden	260	6.0	+3.9
Majority		1,153	26.6	+12.3
Turnout		4,333	46.8	+5.5
Labour hold		Swing		

=== Stretford ===
Stretford
Party	Candidate	Votes	%	±%
Labour	S. Adshead*	2,097	51.6	+3.7
Conservative	F. D. Redfern	1,632	40.1	−6.7
Liberal Democrats	F. C. Beswick	194	4.8	−0.5
Green	E. M. Jocys	143	3.5	+3.5
Majority		465	11.4	+10.2
Turnout		4,066	50.5	+2.7
Labour hold		Swing		

=== Talbot ===
Talbot
Party	Candidate	Votes	%	±%
Labour	B. J. Hughes	2,026	72.6	+1.8
Conservative	C. J. Levenston	578	20.7	−8.5
Green	D. Glazier	187	6.7	+6.7
Majority		1,448	51.9	+10.2
Turnout		2,791	40.3	+5.5
Labour hold		Swing		

=== Timperley ===
Timperley (2 vacancies)
Party	Candidate	Votes	%	±%
Conservative	P. A. Dixon	1,939	23.5	−3.1
Conservative	H. Scholar	1,918	23.3	−3.5
Labour	A. D. McNee	1,328	16.1	+14.7
Labour	R. W. J. Small	1,142	13.9	+10.3
Liberal Democrats	M. E. Clarke	835	10.1	−9.8
Liberal Democrats	D. C. R. Horstead	770	9.3	−11.4
Green	K. R. Robinson	310	3.8	+1.5
Majority		590	7.2	−5.7
Turnout		8,242	50.5	+4.0
Conservative gain from Liberal Democrats		Swing		
Conservative hold		Swing		

=== Urmston ===
Urmston
Party	Candidate	Votes	%	±%
Labour	D. Acton*	2,105	50.6	+5.1
Conservative	J. G. Graham	1,754	42.2	−5.0
Green	H. E. Jocys	297	7.1	+7.1
Majority		351	8.4	+6.8
Turnout		4,156	53.1	+2.2
Labour hold		Swing		

=== Village ===
Village
Party	Candidate	Votes	%	±%
Conservative	A. Bowker	1,625	35.6	−0.9
Labour	D. R. Holland	1,495	32.7	+13.8
Liberal Democrats	C. S. Fink	1,326	29.0	−14.1
Green	E. A. Wright	120	2.6	+1.1
Majority		130	2.8	−3.8
Turnout		4,566	55.0	+5.1
Conservative gain from Liberal Democrats		Swing		
