= 1980 Trafford Metropolitan Borough Council election =

1980 UK local government election

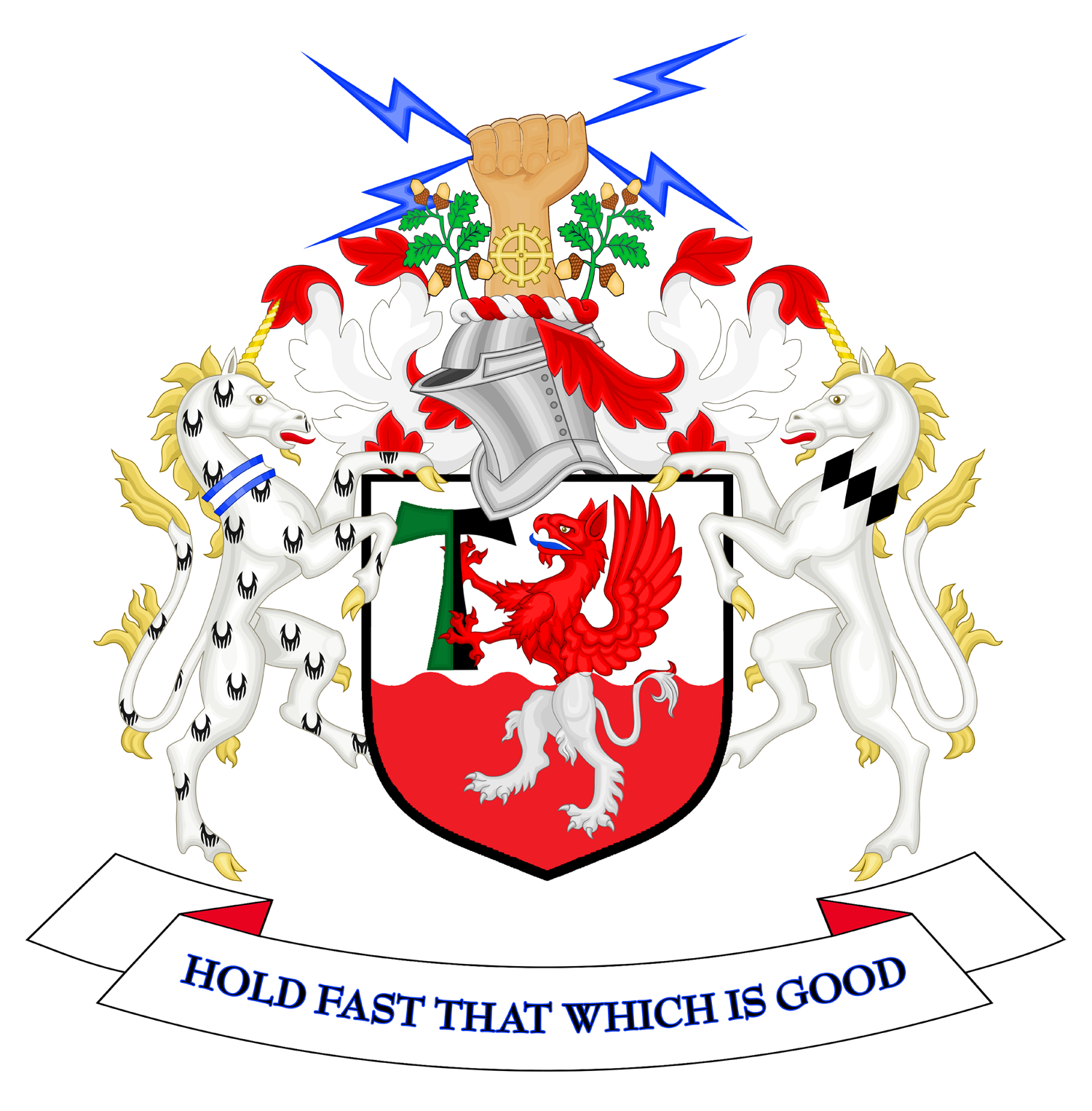
- 1 May 1980

22 of 63 seats to Trafford Metropolitan Borough Council 32 seats needed for a majority
	First party	Second party	Third party
Leader	Jonathan Taylor	Richard Mee	John Phillipson
Party	Conservative	Labour	Liberal
Leader's seat	Brooklands	Sale Moor	Priory
Last election	15 seats, 45.4%	11 seats, 30.9%	2 seats, 23.7%
Seats before	47	14	2
Seats won	9	11	2
Seats after	39	20	4
Seat change	▼8	▲6	▲2
Popular vote	32,328	31,203	13,675
Percentage	41.9%	40.4%	17.7%
Swing	▼3.5%	▲9.5%	▼6.0%
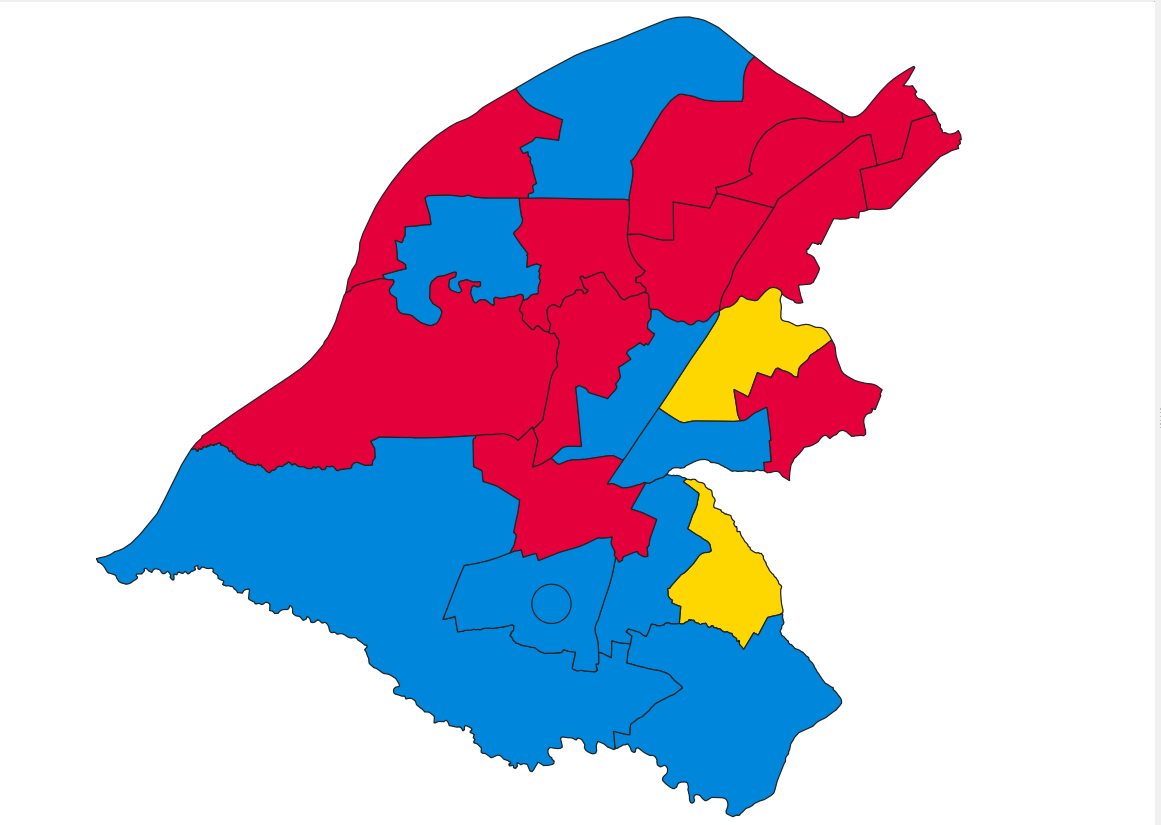
- Map of results of 1980 election
Leader of the Council before election
Jonathan Taylor
Conservative
Leader of the Council after election
Jonathan Taylor
Conservative

Elections to Trafford Council were held on Thursday, 1 May 1980. One third of the council was up for election, with each successful candidate to serve a four-year term of office, expiring in 1984. Boundary changes were implemented for these elections, however, these changes were not sufficient for the whole council to be re-elected. The Conservative Party retained overall control of the council.

== Election result ==
Party	Votes		Seats			Full Council	
Conservative Party	32,328 (41.9%)	▼3.5	9 (40.9%)	9 / 22	▼8	39 (61.9%)	39 / 63
Labour Party	31,203 (40.4%)	▲9.5	11 (50.0%)	11 / 22	▲6	20 (31.7%)	20 / 63
Liberal Party	13,675 (17.7%)	▼6.0	2 (9.1%)	2 / 22	▲2	4 (6.3%)	4 / 63
Communist Party	40 (0.0%)	0.0	0 (0.0%)	0 / 22	0	0 (0.0%)	0 / 63

↓
20	4	39

== Ward results ==
=== Altrincham ===
Altrincham (2 vacancies)
Party	Candidate	Votes	%	±%
Conservative	Richard Finch	1,472	47.9	−5.3
Conservative	Catherine Gordon*	1,323	43.1	−10.1
Labour	Geoffrey Mountain	1,156	37.7	N/A
Labour	Gordon Scott	1,102	35.9	N/A
Liberal	Mary Booth	593	19.3	−27.5
Liberal	Hilary Hughes	490	16.0	−30.8
Majority		167	5.4	−1.1
Turnout		3,070	39.8	−29.7
Conservative hold		Swing		
Conservative hold		Swing		

=== Bowdon ===
Bowdon
Party	Candidate	Votes	%	±%
Conservative	Barbara Sutton Hall*	2,473	60.5	−4.2
Liberal	Richard Slack	1,022	25.0	+3.3
Labour	Arthur Johnson	592	14.5	+0.9
Majority		1,451	35.5	−7.5
Turnout		4,087	46.9	−30.0
Conservative hold		Swing		

=== Broadheath ===
Broadheath
Party	Candidate	Votes	%	±%
Labour	Paul Dolan	1,470	44.1	+13.8
Conservative	Ken Davies	1,363	40.9	−4.7
Liberal	Bernard Gaylard	499	15.0	−9.1
Majority		107	3.2	−12.0
Turnout		3,332	42.0	−35.3
Labour gain from Conservative		Swing		

=== Brooklands ===
Brooklands
Party	Candidate	Votes	%	±%
Conservative	J. B. Ludlam*	2,107	52.5	−11.3
Liberal	Colin Bearfield	1,401	34.9	+8.8
Labour	J. Shaw	507	12.6	+2.5
Majority		706	17.6	+3.3
Turnout		4,015	50.2	+3.1
Conservative hold		Swing		

=== Bucklow ===
Bucklow
Party	Candidate	Votes	%	±%
Labour	John Paul*	2,067	80.4	+18.7
Conservative	I. S. Balcombe	334	13.0	−25.3
Liberal	B. Wilson	169	6.6	+6.6
Majority		1,733	67.4	+44.0
Turnout		2,570	36.4	−33.9
Labour hold		Swing		

=== Clifford ===
Clifford
Party	Candidate	Votes	%	±%
Labour	Tony Lloyd	2,241	66.7	+15.3
Conservative	J. T. Lamb	1,119	33.3	−2.9
Majority		1,122	33.4	+30.3
Turnout		3,360	43.2	−16.9
Labour hold		Swing		

=== Davyhulme East ===
Davyhulme East
Party	Candidate	Votes	%	±%
Conservative	Frank Eadie*	1,408	43.6	−7.1
Labour	Laura Seex	1,311	40.6	+7.9
Liberal	T. M. Owen	512	15.8	−0.9
Majority		97	3.0	−15.0
Turnout		3,231	42.4	−37.2
Conservative hold		Swing		

=== Davyhulme West ===
Davyhulme West
Party	Candidate	Votes	%	±%
Labour	A. Stringer	1,411	38.7	−0.6
Conservative	David Harding*	1,378	37.8	+37.8
Liberal	L. O'Rourke	856	23.5	−37.2
Majority		33	0.9	−20.5
Turnout		3,645	44.5	−30.5
Labour gain from Conservative		Swing		

=== Flixton ===
Flixton
Party	Candidate	Votes	%	±%
Conservative	Neil Fitzpatrick*	1,403	38.2	−15.1
Labour	J. D. Brown	1,245	33.9	+3.5
Liberal	David Earl	1,183	32.2	+15.9
Majority		158	4.3	−18.6
Turnout		3,673	48.8	−32.1
Conservative hold		Swing		

=== Hale ===
Hale
Party	Candidate	Votes	%	±%
Conservative	Roy Godwin*	2,596	69.2	−0.1
Liberal	Constance Ball	852	22.7	+4.2
Labour	Raymond Tully	305	8.1	−4.1
Majority		1,744	46.5	−4.3
Turnout		3,753	43.4	−35.4
Conservative hold		Swing		

=== Longford ===
Longford
Party	Candidate	Votes	%	±%
Labour	Maureen Cottam*	2,252	62.7	+21.6
Conservative	John Schofield	1,341	37.3	−7.2
Majority		911	25.4	+22.0
Turnout		3,593	46.9	−25.8
Labour hold		Swing		

=== Mersey-St. Mary's ===
Mersey St. Marys
Party	Candidate	Votes	%	±%
Conservative	Ivor Hurst*	2,306	51.9	−2.5
Liberal	E. Critchlow	1,188	26.7	−2.2
Labour	H. Pollard	951	21.4	+4.7
Majority		1,118	25.2	−0.4
Turnout		4,445	46.6	−32.0
Conservative hold		Swing		

=== Park ===
Park
Party	Candidate	Votes	%	±%
Labour	Herbert Pyper*	1,981	65.0	+13.3
Conservative	W. P. Coates	1,027	33.7	−5.3
Communist	E. H. Hook	40	1.3	+0.3
Majority		954	31.3	+18.6
Turnout		3,048	42.9	−32.3
Labour hold		Swing		

=== Priory ===
Priory
Party	Candidate	Votes	%	±%
Liberal	John Golding	1,459	42.4	+0.7
Conservative	John Sutton*	1,218	35.4	−3.6
Labour	R. J. Ellis	762	22.2	+2.9
Majority		241	7.0	+4.3
Turnout		3,439	43.1	−32.2
Liberal gain from Conservative		Swing		

=== Sale Moor ===
Sale Moor
Party	Candidate	Votes	%	±%
Labour	Barry Brotherton	1,780	50.9	+4.5
Conservative	R. Maley	1,072	30.6	−8.1
Liberal	A. C. Halliday	647	18.5	+3.6
Majority		708	20.2	+12.5
Turnout		3,499	44.4	−30.8
Labour gain from Conservative		Swing		

=== St. Martin's ===
St Martins
Party	Candidate	Votes	%	±%
Labour	Alan Hadley	2,286	60.5	+31.7
Conservative	T. Almond*	1,493	39.5	−7.8
Majority		793	21.0	+2.5
Turnout		3,779	41.7	−33.3
Labour gain from Conservative		Swing		

=== Stretford ===
Stretford
Party	Candidate	Votes	%	±%
Labour	C. Reid	1,952	54.6	+19.7
Conservative	Colin Warbrick*	1,623	45.4	−8.4
Majority		329	9.2	−9.7
Turnout		3,575	43.3	−34.7
Labour gain from Conservative		Swing		

=== Talbot ===
Talbot
Party	Candidate	Votes	%	±%
Labour	Daniel Sullivan*	2,192	74.4	+17.9
Conservative	Benita Dirikis	754	25.6	−9.3
Majority		1,438	48.8	+27.3
Turnout		2,946	39.1	−29.9
Labour hold		Swing		

=== Timperley ===
Timperley
Party	Candidate	Votes	%	±%
Conservative	Roy Hall*	1,590	43.7	−6.9
Liberal	Michael Farnsworth	1,309	36.0	−13.4
Labour	E. Axon	739	20.3	+20.3
Majority		281	7.7	+6.4
Turnout		3,638	41.2	−35.2
Conservative hold		Swing		

=== Urmston ===
Urmston
Party	Candidate	Votes	%	±%
Labour	D. Horner	1,686	52.2	+25.1
Conservative	Ruth Royle-Higginson*	1,546	47.8	−3.0
Majority		140	4.3	−19.5
Turnout		3,232	42.2	−35.5
Labour gain from Conservative		Swing		

=== Village ===
Village
Party	Candidate	Votes	%	±%
Liberal	Raymond Bowker	1,495	36.5	+16.4
Conservative	Audrey Weedall*	1,382	33.8	−14.9
Labour	Robert Short	1,215	29.7	−1.5
Majority		113	2.8	−0.5
Turnout		4,092	50.2	+15.5
Liberal gain from Conservative		Swing		

== By-elections between 1980 and 1982 ==
Davyhulme West By-Election 11 June 1981
Party	Candidate	Votes	%	±%
Labour	Laura Seex	1,417	43.3	+4.6
Conservative	David Harding	1,242	37.9	+1.0
Liberal	J. A. Cottrell	617	18.8	−4.7
Majority		175	5.3	+4.4
Turnout		3,276	39.7	−4.8
Labour gain from Liberal		Swing		

Flixton By-Election 9 July 1981
Party	Candidate	Votes	%	±%
Liberal	David Earl	1,400	40.1	+9.2
Conservative	P. Schofield	1,199	34.3	−2.3
Labour	Raymond Tully	895	25.6	−6.9
Majority		201	5.8	−1.7
Turnout		3,494	44.4	−4.4
Liberal gain from Conservative		Swing		

Village By-Election 18 March 1982
Party	Candidate	Votes	%	±%
Liberal	Richard Slack	1,338	38.6	+2.1
Conservative	David Merrell	1,138	32.9	−0.9
Labour	Robert Crewe	988	28.5	−1.2
Majority		200	5.8	+3.0
Turnout		3,464	41.2	−9.0
Liberal gain from Conservative		Swing		
