= Park (Trafford ward) =

Former electoral ward of Trafford, Greater Manchester, England

Park was an electoral ward of Trafford covering Trafford Park and part of Stretford.

The ward was abolished in 2004, and most of its area incorporated into the new Gorse Hill Ward.

== Councillors ==
Election	Councillor	Councillor	Councillor
1973	J. Hurst (Lab)	Herbert Pyper (Lab)	James Haydock (Lab)
1975	J. Hurst (Lab)	Herbert Pyper (Lab)	J. Schofield (Con)
1976	J. Hurst (Lab)	Herbert Pyper (Lab)	J. Schofield (Con)
1978	James Haydock (Lab)	Herbert Pyper (Lab)	J. Schofield (Con)
1979	James Haydock (Lab)	Herbert Pyper (Lab)	A. Davies (Lab)
1980	James Haydock (Lab)	Herbert Pyper (Lab)	A. Davies (Lab)
1982	James Haydock (Lab)	Herbert Pyper (Lab)	A. Davies (Lab)
1983	James Haydock (Lab)	Herbert Pyper (Lab)	Ray Tully (Lab)
1984	James Haydock (Lab)	Chris Reid (Lab)	Ray Tully (Lab)
1986	James Haydock (Lab)	Chris Reid (Lab)	Ray Tully (Lab)
1987	James Haydock (Lab)	Chris Reid (Lab)	Ray Tully (Lab)
1988	James Haydock (Lab)	Philip Morgan (Lab)	Ray Tully (Lab)
1990	James Haydock (Lab)	Philip Morgan (Lab)	Ray Tully (Lab)
1991	James Haydock (Lab)	Philip Morgan (Lab)	Ray Tully (Lab)
1992	James Haydock (Lab)	Justine Williams (Lab)	Ray Tully (Lab)
1994	James Haydock (Lab)	Justine Williams (Lab)	Ray Tully (Lab)
1995	James Haydock (Lab)	Justine Williams (Lab)	Ray Tully (Lab)
1996	James Haydock (Lab)	Justine Williams (Lab)	Ray Tully (Lab)
1998	James Haydock (Lab)	Justine Williams (Lab)	Ray Tully (Lab)
1999	James Haydock (Lab)	Justine Williams (Lab)	Ray Tully (Lab)
2000	James Haydock (Lab)	Justine Williams (Lab)	Ray Tully (Lab)
2002	Ian McDermott (Lab)	Justine Williams (Lab)	Ray Tully (Lab)
2003	Ian McDermott (Lab)	Justine Williams (Lab)	Margaret Strickland (Lab)

== Elections in the 2000s ==
2003
Party	Candidate	Votes	%	±%
Labour	Mary Strickland	1,604	61.5	−1.3
Conservative	John Schofield	1,006	38.5	+1.3
Majority		598	23.0	−2.6
Turnout		2,610	44.0	−2.8
Labour hold		Swing		

2002
Party	Candidate	Votes	%	±%
Labour	Ian McDermott	1,750	62.8	+7.4
Conservative	Pervez Nakvi	1,038	37.2	−7.4
Majority		712	25.6	+14.8
Turnout		2,788	46.8	+22.0
Labour hold		Swing		

2000
Party	Candidate	Votes	%	±%
Labour	Justine Williams*	835	55.4	−4.0
Conservative	Pervez Nakvi	672	44.6	+10.9
Majority		153	10.8	−14.9
Turnout		1,507	24.8	+1.0
Labour hold		Swing		

== Elections in the 1990s ==
1999
Party	Candidate	Votes	%	±%
Labour	Tully*	858	59.4	−4.9
Conservative	Nakvi	487	33.7	−2.0
Liberal Democrats	JAD Ackroyd	99	6.9	+6.9
Majority		371	25.7	−2.9
Turnout		1,444	23.8	−0.6
Labour hold		Swing		

1998
Party	Candidate	Votes	%	±%
Labour	J. R. Haydock*	956	64.3	−2.5
Conservative	E. J. Kelson	531	35.7	+2.5
Majority		425	28.6	−5.0
Turnout		1,487	24.4	−8.0
Labour hold		Swing		

1996
Party	Candidate	Votes	%	±%
Labour	J. Williams*	1,307	66.8	+0.1
Conservative	E. J. Kelson	650	33.2	−0.1
Majority		657	33.6	+0.2
Turnout		1,957	32.4	−4.6
Labour hold		Swing		

1995
Party	Candidate	Votes	%	±%
Labour	R. A. Tully*	1,481	66.7	+7.9
Conservative	E. J. Kelson	739	33.3	+1.2
Majority		742	33.4	+6.7
Turnout		2,220	37.0	−3.6
Labour hold		Swing		

1994
Party	Candidate	Votes	%	±%
Labour	J. R. Haydock*	1,415	58.8	+11.4
Conservative	C. H. Davenport	772	32.1	−14.0
Liberal Democrats	S. O. Bowater	218	9.1	+2.5
Majority		643	26.7	+25.4
Turnout		2,405	40.6	+6.6
Labour hold		Swing		

1992
Party	Candidate	Votes	%	±%
Labour	J. Williams	955	47.4	−11.6
Conservative	E. J. Kelson	928	46.1	+5.1
Liberal Democrats	C. R. Hedley	132	6.6	+6.6
Majority		27	1.3	−16.6
Turnout		2,015	34.0	−7.4
Labour hold		Swing		

1991
Party	Candidate	Votes	%	±%
Labour	R. A. Tully*	1,461	59.0	−5.0
Conservative	E. J. Kelson	1,017	41.0	+5.0
Majority		444	17.9	−10.0
Turnout		2,478	41.4	−5.0
Labour hold		Swing		

1990
Party	Candidate	Votes	%	±%
Labour	J. R. Haydock*	1,813	64.0	+6.3
Conservative	E. J. Kelson	1,022	36.0	+0.3
Majority		791	27.9	+5.9
Turnout		2,835	46.4	+3.1
Labour hold		Swing		

== Elections in the 1980s ==
1988
Party	Candidate	Votes	%	±%
Labour	P. J. Morgan	1,521	57.7	+13.9
Conservative	D. Meadowcroft	942	35.7	−3.1
Liberal Democrats	F. C. Beswick	174	6.6	−10.8
Majority		579	22.0	+17.0
Turnout		2,637	43.3	−2.6
Labour hold		Swing		

1987
Party	Candidate	Votes	%	±%
Labour	R. A. Tully*	1,254	43.8	−20.6
Conservative	D. Meadowcroft	1,111	38.8	+3.2
Liberal	F. C. Beswick	497	17.4	+17.4
Majority		143	5.0	−23.7
Turnout		2,862	45.9	+7.6
Labour hold		Swing		

1986
Party	Candidate	Votes	%	±%
Labour	J. R. Haydock*	1,551	64.4	+9.1
Conservative	D. Meadowcroft	859	35.6	+1.0
Majority		692	28.7	+8.0
Turnout		2,410	38.3	−1.9
Labour hold		Swing		

1984
Party	Candidate	Votes	%	±%
Labour	C. Reid	1,413	55.3	+6.0
Conservative	D. Meadowcroft	883	34.6	−3.1
Liberal	C. R. Hedley	259	10.1	−2.9
Majority		530	20.7	+9.1
Turnout		2,555	40.2	−5.5
Labour hold		Swing		

1983
Party	Candidate	Votes	%	±%
Labour	R. A. Tully	1,435	49.3	+7.8
Conservative	D. Meadowcroft	1,097	37.7	−1.9
Alliance	C. R. Hedley	377	13.0	−5.9
Majority		338	11.6	+9.7
Turnout		2,909	45.7	+7.2
Labour hold		Swing		

1982
Party	Candidate	Votes	%	±%
Labour	J. R. Haydock*	1,046	41.5	−23.5
Conservative	F. D. Redfern	998	39.6	+5.9
Liberal	C. R. Hedley	475	18.9	+18.9
Majority		48	1.9	−29.4
Turnout		2,519	38.5	−4.4
Labour hold		Swing		

1980
Party	Candidate	Votes	%	±%
Labour	H. Pyper*	1,981	65.0	+13.3
Conservative	W. P. Coates	1,027	33.7	−5.3
Communist	E. H. Hook	40	1.3	+0.3
Majority		954	31.3	+18.6
Turnout		3,048	42.9	−32.3
Labour hold		Swing		

== Elections in the 1970s ==
1979
Party	Candidate	Votes	%	±%
Labour	A. R. Davies	2,198	51.7	+1.8
Conservative	J. A. Schofield*	1,659	39.0	−9.0
Liberal	C. R. Hedley	354	8.3	+8.3
Communist	E. H. Hook	41	1.0	−1.1
Majority		539	12.7	+10.8
Turnout		4,252	75.2	+36.1
Labour gain from Conservative		Swing		

1978
Party	Candidate	Votes	%	±%
Labour	J. R. Haydock	1,118	49.9	0.0
Conservative	L. Sherwood	1,076	48.0	+0.7
Communist	W. Hudson	47	2.1	−0.7
Majority		42	1.9	−0.7
Turnout		2,241	39.1	−4.2
Labour hold		Swing		

1976
Party	Candidate	Votes	%	±%
Labour	H. Pyper*	1,353	49.9	+8.3
Conservative	W. Matthews	1,282	47.3	+4.5
Communist	M. A. Murray	75	2.8	+0.3
Majority		71	2.6	+1.4
Turnout		2,710	43.3	+3.3
Labour hold		Swing		

1975
Party	Candidate	Votes	%	±%
Conservative	J. A. Schofield	1,061	42.8	
Labour	J. R. Haydock*	1,032	41.6	
Liberal	W. A. Munden	324	13.1	
Communist	A. Jarratt	61	2.5	
Majority		29	1.2	
Turnout		2,478	40.0	
Conservative gain from Labour		Swing		

1973
Party	Candidate	Votes	%	±%
Labour	J. Shaw	1,530	57.8	
Labour	H. Pyper	1,503		
Labour	J. R. Haydock	1,484		
Conservative	W. Matthews	936	35.4	
Conservative	Evans	886		
Conservative	Jaminson	860		
Communist	Jarrett	181	6.8	
Majority		548		
Turnout		2,647	39.2	
Labour win (new seat)				
Labour win (new seat)				
Labour win (new seat)				
