= St Martins (Trafford ward) =

Former electoral ward in Greater Manchester, England

St Martins was an electoral ward of Trafford covering the western part of Ashton upon Mersey in Sale, Greater Manchester, including the Ashton Village.

The ward was abolished in 2004, and its area split between the new Ashton upon Mersey, Bucklow-St. Martins and St Mary's wards.

== Councillors ==
Election	Councillor	Councillor	Councillor
1973	Michael King (Con)	William Munro (Lab)	Stanley Brownhill (Con)
Jul 1974	Michael King (Con)	Peter Morgan-Evans (Con)	Stanley Brownhill (Con)
1975	Michael King (Con)	Peter Morgan-Evans (Con)	Stanley Brownhill (Con)
1976	Michael King (Con)	Peter Morgan-Evans (Con)	Stanley Brownhill (Con)
Mar 1977	Michael King (Con)	T. Almond (Con)	Stanley Brownhill (Con)
1978	Michael King (Con)	T. Almond (Con)	Stanley Brownhill (Con)
1979	Michael King (Con)	T. Almond (Con)	Stanley Brownhill (Con)
1980	Michael King (Con)	Alan Hadley (Lab)	Stanley Brownhill (Con)
1982	Michael King (Con)	Alan Hadley (Lab)	Stanley Brownhill (Con)
1983	Michael King (Con)	Alan Hadley (Lab)	Geoff Mountain (Lab)
1984	Michael King (Con)	Alan Hadley (Lab)	Geoff Mountain (Lab)
1986	Len Murkin (Lab)	Alan Hadley (Lab)	Geoff Mountain (Lab)
1987	Len Murkin (Lab)	Alan Hadley (Lab)	Geoff Mountain (Lab)
1988	Len Murkin (Lab)	Paul English (Lab)	Geoff Mountain (Lab)
1990	Len Murkin (Lab)	Paul English (Lab)	Geoff Mountain (Lab)
1991	Len Murkin (Lab)	Paul English (Lab)	David Quayle (Lab)
1992	Len Murkin (Lab)	Ralph Nicholas (Con)	David Quayle (Lab)
1994	Len Murkin (Lab)	Ralph Nicholas (Con)	David Quayle (Lab)
1995	Len Murkin (Lab)	Ralph Nicholas (Con)	David Quayle (Lab)
1996	Len Murkin (Lab)	Kate Harper (Lab)	David Quayle (Lab)
1998	Len Murkin (Lab)	Kate Harper (Lab)	David Quayle (Lab)
1999	Len Murkin (Lab)	Kate Harper (Lab)	David Quayle (Lab)
2000	Len Murkin (Lab)	Angela Gray (Lab)	David Quayle (Lab)
2002	Len Murkin (Lab)	Angela Gray (Lab)	David Quayle (Lab)
2003	Len Murkin (Lab)	Angela Gray (Lab)	David Quayle (Lab)

== Elections in the 2000s ==
2003
Party	Candidate	Votes	%	±%
Labour	David Quayle*	2,148	51.2	−15.2
Conservative	Colin Foster	1,461	34.8	+1.2
Liberal Democrats	Richard Elliott	584	13.9	+13.9
Majority		687	16.4	−16.4
Turnout		4,193	53.3	+3.5
Labour hold		Swing		

2002
Party	Candidate	Votes	%	±%
Labour	Leonard Murkin*	2,737	66.4	+20.9
Conservative	Dilriaz Butt	1,386	33.6	−11.4
Majority		1,351	32.8	+32.3
Turnout		4,123	49.8	+19.9
Labour hold		Swing		

2000
Party	Candidate	Votes	%	±%
Labour	Angela Gray	1,153	45.5	−9.1
Conservative	William Cole	1,140	45.0	+8.7
Liberal Democrats	Richard Elliott	241	9.5	+0.4
Majority		13	0.5	−17.8
Turnout		2,535	29.9	+3.8
Labour hold		Swing		

== Elections in the 1990s ==
1999
Party	Candidate	Votes	%	±%
Labour	Quayle*	1,208	54.6	−5.2
Conservative	Myers	803	36.3	+3.8
Liberal Democrats	Dunn	200	9.1	+1.5
Majority		405	18.3	−9.0
Turnout		2,211	26.1	−2.7
Labour hold		Swing		

1998
Party	Candidate	Votes	%	±%
Labour	L. T. Murkin*	1,481	59.8	−2.5
Conservative	P. A. Almond	805	32.5	+2.5
Liberal Democrats	T. J. P. Corbett	189	7.6	0
Majority		676	27.3	−5.0
Turnout		2,475	28.8	−6.4
Labour hold		Swing		

1996
Party	Candidate	Votes	%	±%
Labour	K. C. Harper	1,915	62.3	−2.5
Conservative	M. O. Joyce	922	30.0	−5.2
Liberal Democrats	D. J. Kelly	235	7.6	+7.6
Majority		993	32.3	+2.7
Turnout		3,072	35.2	−4.0
Labour gain from Conservative		Swing		

1995
Party	Candidate	Votes	%	±%
Labour	D. A. Quayle*	2,225	64.8	+7.3
Conservative	C. J. D. Browning	1,209	35.2	+3.1
Majority		1,016	29.6	+3.4
Turnout		3,434	39.2	−4.4
Labour hold		Swing		

1994
Party	Candidate	Votes	%	±%
Labour	L. T. Murkin*	2,232	57.5	+11.9
Conservative	J. Nicholas	1,247	32.1	−15.4
Liberal Democrats	T. J. P. Corbett	402	10.4	+3.4
Majority		1,016	26.2	+24.3
Turnout		3,881	43.6	+7.0
Labour hold		Swing		

1992
Party	Candidate	Votes	%	±%
Conservative	R. Nicholas	1,564	47.5	+9.5
Labour	K. Harper	1,502	45.6	−6.1
Liberal Democrats	T. J. P. Corbett	230	7.0	−3.2
Majority		62	1.9	−11.8
Turnout		3,296	36.6	−6.2
Conservative gain from Labour		Swing		

1991
Party	Candidate	Votes	%	±%
Labour	D. A. Quayle	2,032	51.7	−8.6
Conservative	J. Tolhurst	1,493	38.0	+4.3
Liberal Democrats	T. J. P. Corbett	402	10.2	+10.2
Majority		539	13.7	−12.9
Turnout		3,927	42.8	−4.0
Labour hold		Swing		

1990
Party	Candidate	Votes	%	±%
Labour	L. T. Murkin*	2,613	60.3	+8.5
Conservative	J. Tolhurst	1,460	33.7	−3.9
Green	J. A. Bowden	260	6.0	+3.9
Majority		1,153	26.6	+12.3
Turnout		4,333	46.8	+5.5
Labour hold		Swing		

== Elections in the 1980s ==
1988
Party	Candidate	Votes	%	±%
Labour	P. J. English	2,030	51.8	+7.6
Conservative	R. Maley	1,471	37.6	+0.3
Liberal Democrats	T. J. P. Corbett	334	8.5	−7.7
Green	J. A. Bowden	82	2.1	−0.2
Majority		559	14.3	+7.4
Turnout		3,917	41.3	−6.4
Labour hold		Swing		

1987
Party	Candidate	Votes	%	±%
Labour	G. H. Mountain*	1,994	44.2	−7.9
Conservative	R. Maley	1,684	37.3	+4.5
Liberal	T. J. P. Corbett	729	16.2	+1.0
Green	J. Bowden	106	2.3	+2.3
Majority		310	6.9	−12.4
Turnout		4,513	47.7	+2.5
Labour hold		Swing		

1986
Party	Candidate	Votes	%	±%
Labour	L. T. Murkin	2,243	52.1	−0.5
Conservative	M. E. King*	1,411	32.8	+1.3
Liberal	T. J. P. Corbett	654	15.2	−0.7
Majority		832	19.3	−1.8
Turnout		4,308	45.2	+2.5
Labour gain from Conservative		Swing		

1984
Party	Candidate	Votes	%	±%
Labour	A. J. Hadley*	2,130	52.6	0
Conservative	P. Bates	1,275	31.5	−2.2
Liberal	S. Corbett	642	15.9	+2.2
Majority		855	21.1	+2.3
Turnout		4,047	42.7	−1.5
Labour hold		Swing		

1983
Party	Candidate	Votes	%	±%
Labour	G. H. Mountain	1,987	52.6	+16.5
Conservative	S. G. Brownhill*	1,275	33.7	−9.5
Alliance	E. P. M. Wollaston	516	13.7	−7.0
Majority		712	18.8	+11.8
Turnout		3,778	44.2	+0.9
Labour gain from Conservative		Swing		

1982
Party	Candidate	Votes	%	±%
Conservative	M. E. King*	1,748	43.2	+3.7
Labour	G. H. Mountain	1,464	36.1	−24.4
SDP	R. C. Tweed	838	20.7	+20.7
Majority		284	7.0	−14.0
Turnout		4,050	43.3	+1.6
Conservative hold		Swing		

1980
Party	Candidate	Votes	%	±%
Labour	A. J. Hadley	2,286	60.5	+31.7
Conservative	T. Almond*	1,493	39.5	−7.8
Majority		793	21.0	+2.5
Turnout		3,779	41.7	−33.3
Labour gain from Conservative		Swing		

== Elections in the 1970s ==
1979
Party	Candidate	Votes	%	±%
Conservative	S. Brownhill*	4,198	47.3	−15.6
Labour	G. Woodburn	2,554	28.8	+7.6
Liberal	G. C. Kinsey	2,127	24.0	+10.4
Majority		1,644	18.5	−23.2
Turnout		8,879	75.0	+39.7
Conservative hold		Swing		

1978
Party	Candidate	Votes	%	±%
Conservative	M. E. King*	2,543	62.9	−3.9
Labour	G. Woodburn	858	21.2	−12.0
Liberal	G. C. Kinsey	550	13.6	+13.6
Communist	J. E. Stitt	89	2.2	+2.2
Majority		1,685	41.7	+8.0
Turnout		4,040	35.3	−2.9
Conservative hold		Swing		

By-Election 24 March 1977
Party	Candidate	Votes	%	±%
Conservative	T. Almond	1,862	58.7	−8.1
Labour	B. Brotherton	744	23.5	−9.7
Liberal	W. J. Golding	566	17.8	+17.8
Majority		1,118	35.2	+1.5
Turnout		3,172	28.1	−10.1
Conservative hold		Swing		

1976
Party	Candidate	Votes	%	±%
Conservative	P. A. G. Morgan Evans*	2,778	66.8	−2.3
Labour	G. T. Pollitt	1,378	33.2	+2.3
Majority		1,400	33.7	−4.4
Turnout		4,156	38.2	+7.8
Conservative hold		Swing		

1975
Party	Candidate	Votes	%	±%
Conservative	S. G. Brownhill*	2,276	69.1	
Labour	J. K. Morgan	1,020	30.9	
Majority		1,256	38.1	
Turnout		3,296	30.4	
Conservative hold		Swing		

By-Election 18 July 1974
Party	Candidate	Votes	%	±%
Conservative	P. A. G. Morgan Evans	1,752	46.2	−13.8
Labour	T. J. Packham	1,191	31.4	
Liberal	M. Wood	849	22.4	
Majority		561	14.8	
Turnout		3,792	34.0	
Conservative gain from Labour		Swing		

1973
Party	Candidate	Votes	%	±%
Conservative	M. E. King	2,178	50.5	
Labour	W. Munro	2,137	49.5	
Conservative	S. G. Brownhill	2,029		
Conservative	G. Rubenstein	1,832		
Labour	E. Mellor	1,800		
Labour	G. Naggs	1,770		
Majority		197		
Turnout		4,315	37.0	
Conservative win (new seat)				
Labour win (new seat)				
Conservative win (new seat)				
