= 1987 Trafford Metropolitan Borough Council election =

1987 UK local government election

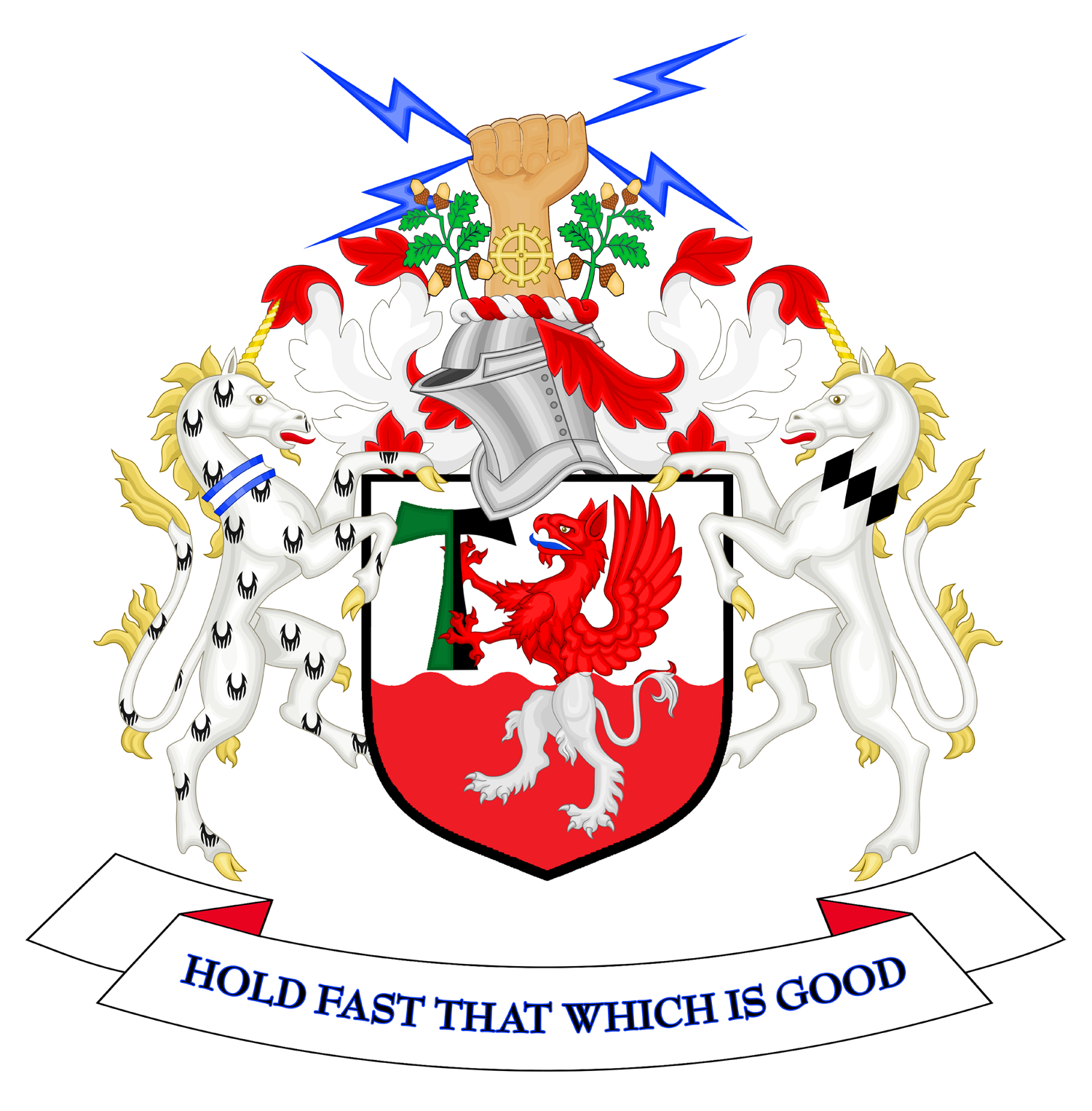
- 7 May 1987

21 of 63 seats to Trafford Metropolitan Borough Council 32 seats needed for a majority
	First party	Second party	Third party
Leader	Colin Warbrick	Barry Brotherton	John Davenport
Party	Conservative	Labour	Alliance
Leader's seat	Urmston	Sale Moor	Timperley
Last election	6 seats, 37.6%	14 seats, 39.6%	3 seats, 22.3%
Seats before	24	30	9
Seats won	15	6	0
Seats after	28	28	7
Seat change	▲4	▼2	▼2
Popular vote	41,889	26,825	18,430
Percentage	47.7%	30.6%	21.0%
Swing	▲10.1%	▼9.0%	▼1.3%
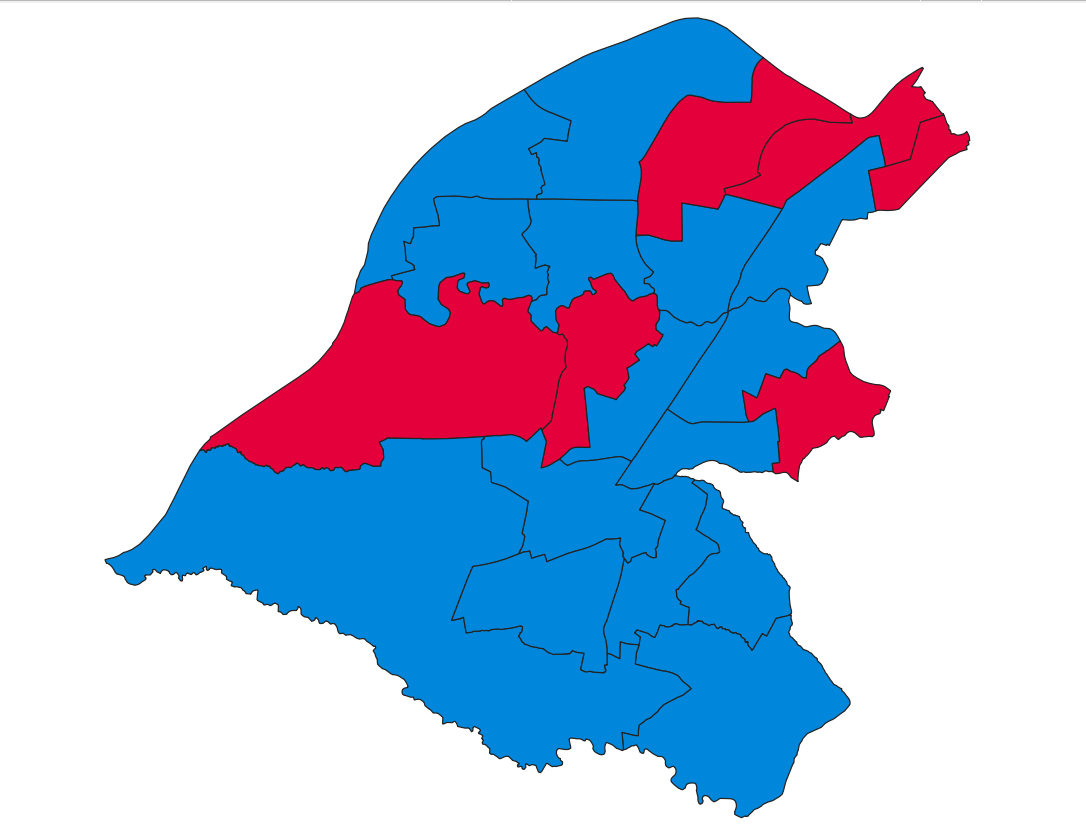
- Map of results of 1987 election
Leader of the Council before election
Barry Brotherton
Labour
Leader of the Council after election
Barry Brotherton
Labour

Elections to Trafford Council were held on 7 May 1987. One third of the council was up for election, with each successful candidate to serve a four-year term of office, expiring in 1991. The council remained under no overall control.

== Election result ==
Party	Votes		Seats			Full Council	
Conservative Party	41,889 (47.7%)	▲10.1	15 (71.4%)	15 / 21	▲4	28 (44.4%)	28 / 63
Labour Party	26,825 (30.6%)	▼9.0	6 (28.6%)	6 / 21	▼2	28 (44.4%)	28 / 63
Alliance	18,430 (21.0%)	▼1.3	0 (0.0%)	0 / 21	▼2	7 (11.1%)	7 / 63
Green Party	552 (0.6%)	▲0.2	0 (0.0%)	0 / 21	Steady	0 (0.0%)	0 / 63
Independent	61 (0.1%)	▲0.1	0 (0.0%)	0 / 21	Steady	0 (0.0%)	0 / 63

↓
28	7	28

== Ward results ==
=== Altrincham ===
Altrincham
Party	Candidate	Votes	%	±%
Conservative	C. S. Gordon*	2,128	51.7	+15.3
Labour	D. Hinder	1,318	32.0	−9.1
SDP	C. F. Keeley-Huggett	673	16.3	−3.2
Majority		810	19.7	+15.1
Turnout		4,119	49.5	+3.4
Conservative hold		Swing		

=== Bowdon ===
Bowdon
Party	Candidate	Votes	%	±%
Conservative	G. Barker*	3,155	68.2	+8.0
SDP	V. G. O'Hara	938	20.3	−4.9
Labour	H. F. Busteed	398	8.6	−2.1
Green	M. R. Rowtham	132	2.9	−1.0
Majority		2,217	48.0	+13.0
Turnout		4,623	50.6	+5.7
Conservative hold		Swing		

=== Broadheath ===
Broadheath
Party	Candidate	Votes	%	±%
Conservative	L. M. L. Burton*	2,203	49.2	+12.2
Labour	J. B. Morton	1,286	28.7	−8.9
SDP	N. Royle	986	22.0	−3.3
Majority		917	20.5	+20.1
Turnout		4,475	51.8	+5.9
Conservative hold		Swing		

=== Brooklands ===
Brooklands
Party	Candidate	Votes	%	±%
Conservative	J. Taylor*	2,679	58.3	+8.0
SDP	B. M. Keeley-Huggett	1,445	31.4	−4.8
Labour	E. D. Shaw	474	10.3	−3.2
Majority		1,234	26.8	+12.7
Turnout		4,598	56.7	+10.7
Conservative hold		Swing		

=== Bucklow ===
Bucklow
Party	Candidate	Votes	%	±%
Labour	K. Rogers*	1,673	63.1	−16.9
Conservative	K. G. Hindley	604	22.8	+2.8
Liberal	C. Martin	374	14.1	+14.1
Majority		1,069	40.3	−19.6
Turnout		2,651	38.5	+6.8
Labour hold		Swing		

=== Clifford ===
Clifford
Party	Candidate	Votes	%	±%
Labour	J. S. Maher*	2,452	72.4	−4.7
Conservative	M. T. Wyne	933	27.6	+4.7
Majority		1,519	44.9	−9.2
Turnout		3,385	38.7	+5.2
Labour hold		Swing		

=== Davyhulme East ===
Davyhulme East
Party	Candidate	Votes	%	±%
Conservative	R. E. Crosbie*	2,396	56.6	+6.4
Labour	N. J. Bentham	1,203	28.4	−8.2
Liberal	D. E. Unwin	635	15.0	+15.0
Majority		1,193	28.2	+14.6
Turnout		4,234	54.3	+7.7
Conservative hold		Swing		

=== Davyhulme West ===
Davyhulme West
Party	Candidate	Votes	%	±%
Conservative	P. Bates	2,314	48.6	+12.7
Labour	F. Mottley	1,490	31.3	−11.2
Liberal	M. E. Clarke	958	20.1	−1.5
Majority		824	17.3	+10.7
Turnout		4,762	56.5	+9.3
Conservative hold		Swing		

=== Flixton ===
Flixton
Party	Candidate	Votes	%	±%
Conservative	A. R. Coupe	2,294	45.1	+11.0
Liberal	P. I. M. Crompton	1,565	30.7	−0.1
Labour	P. G. Dowland	1,231	24.2	−10.9
Majority		729	14.3	+13.2
Turnout		5,090	63.2	+10.8
Conservative gain from Liberal		Swing		

=== Hale ===
Hale
Party	Candidate	Votes	%	±%
Conservative	N. W. Barrett*	3,359	70.6	+13.4
Liberal	G. P. Pawson	1,035	21.8	−12.3
Labour	G. P. F. Williams	274	5.8	−0.7
Green	J. J. Wharton	88	1.9	−0.3
Majority		2,324	48.9	+25.8
Turnout		4,756	53.2	+7.5
Conservative hold		Swing		

=== Longford ===
Longford
Party	Candidate	Votes	%	±%
Conservative	K. G. Summerfield	1,841	45.8	+6.1
Labour	P. J. Morgan*	1,730	43.0	−11.4
SDP	M. L. Kugler	450	11.2	+6.3
Majority		111	2.8	−3.8
Turnout		4,021	52.7	+7.0
Conservative gain from Labour		Swing		

=== Mersey-St. Mary's ===
Mersey St. Marys
Party	Candidate	Votes	%	±%
Conservative	Stanley Brownhill*	2,862	59.3	+7.6
SDP	R. J. Thompson	1,125	23.3	+23.3
Labour	P. Miller	836	17.3	−2.2
Majority		1,737	36.0	+13.2
Turnout		4,823	50.0	+6.6
Conservative hold		Swing		

=== Park ===
Park
Party	Candidate	Votes	%	±%
Labour	R. A. Tully*	1,254	43.8	−20.6
Conservative	D. Meadowcroft	1,111	38.8	+3.2
Liberal	F. C. Beswick	497	17.4	+17.4
Majority		143	5.0	−23.7
Turnout		2,862	45.9	+7.6
Labour hold		Swing		

=== Priory ===
Priory
Party	Candidate	Votes	%	±%
Conservative	Mike King	1,589	38.0	+11.1
Liberal	Cecil Fink	1,482	35.4	−3.9
Labour	P. J. English	1,113	26.6	−7.2
Majority		107	2.6	−2.9
Turnout		4,184	51.6	+9.2
Conservative gain from Liberal		Swing		

=== Sale Moor ===
Sale Moor
Party	Candidate	Votes	%	±%
Labour	C. H. Merry*	1,485	39.0	−9.9
Conservative	G. V. Burrows	1,377	36.1	+6.8
SDP	K. Clarke	881	23.1	+23.1
Green	A. M. Bowden	69	1.8	+1.8
Majority		108	2.8	−16.8
Turnout		3,812	48.5	+8.6
Labour hold		Swing		

=== St. Martin's ===
St. Martins
Party	Candidate	Votes	%	±%
Labour	G. H. Mountain*	1,994	44.2	−7.9
Conservative	R. Maley	1,684	37.3	+4.5
Liberal	T. J. P. Corbett	729	16.2	+1.0
Green	J. Bowden	106	2.3	+2.3
Majority		310	6.9	−12.4
Turnout		4,513	47.7	+2.5
Labour hold		Swing		

=== Stretford ===
Stretford
Party	Candidate	Votes	%	±%
Conservative	H. Walker*	2,042	48.8	+8.6
Labour	J. T. Beer	1,587	37.9	−10.1
SDP	L. L. Sumner	559	13.3	+1.5
Majority		455	10.9	+3.1
Turnout		4,188	50.9	+5.7
Conservative hold		Swing		

=== Talbot ===
Talbot
Party	Candidate	Votes	%	±%
Labour	P. A. Lane*	1,760	61.7	−5.5
Conservative	C. J. Levenston	1,030	36.1	+13.4
Independent	K. J. Martin	61	2.1	+1.6
Majority		730	25.6	−18.9
Turnout		2,851	39.8	+3.6
Labour hold		Swing		

=== Timperley ===
Timperley
Party	Candidate	Votes	%	±%
Conservative	W. J. Watkins*	2,337	48.8	+10.0
Liberal	M. Clancy	1,704	35.6	−5.6
Labour	D. R. Holland	650	13.6	−6.4
Green	N. J. Eadie	101	2.1	+2.1
Majority		633	13.2	+10.8
Turnout		4,792	53.6	+9.4
Conservative hold		Swing		

=== Urmston ===
Urmston
Party	Candidate	Votes	%	±%
Conservative	E. May	2,076	46.7	+6.4
Labour	D. Acton*	1,708	38.5	−4.7
SDP	P. J. Carlon	657	14.8	−1.8
Majority		368	8.3	+5.4
Turnout		4,441	55.8	+10.1
Conservative gain from Labour		Swing		

=== Village ===
Village
Party	Candidate	Votes	%	±%
Conservative	M. J. Booth	1,875	41.0	+11.1
Liberal	C. H. Gibson	1,737	38.0	−6.1
Labour	M. C. Jenkinson	909	19.9	−6.1
Green	K. R. Robinson	56	1.2	+1.2
Majority		138	3.0	−11.2
Turnout		4,577	54.0	+6.5
Conservative hold		Swing		
