= 1979 Trafford Metropolitan Borough Council election =

1979 UK local government election

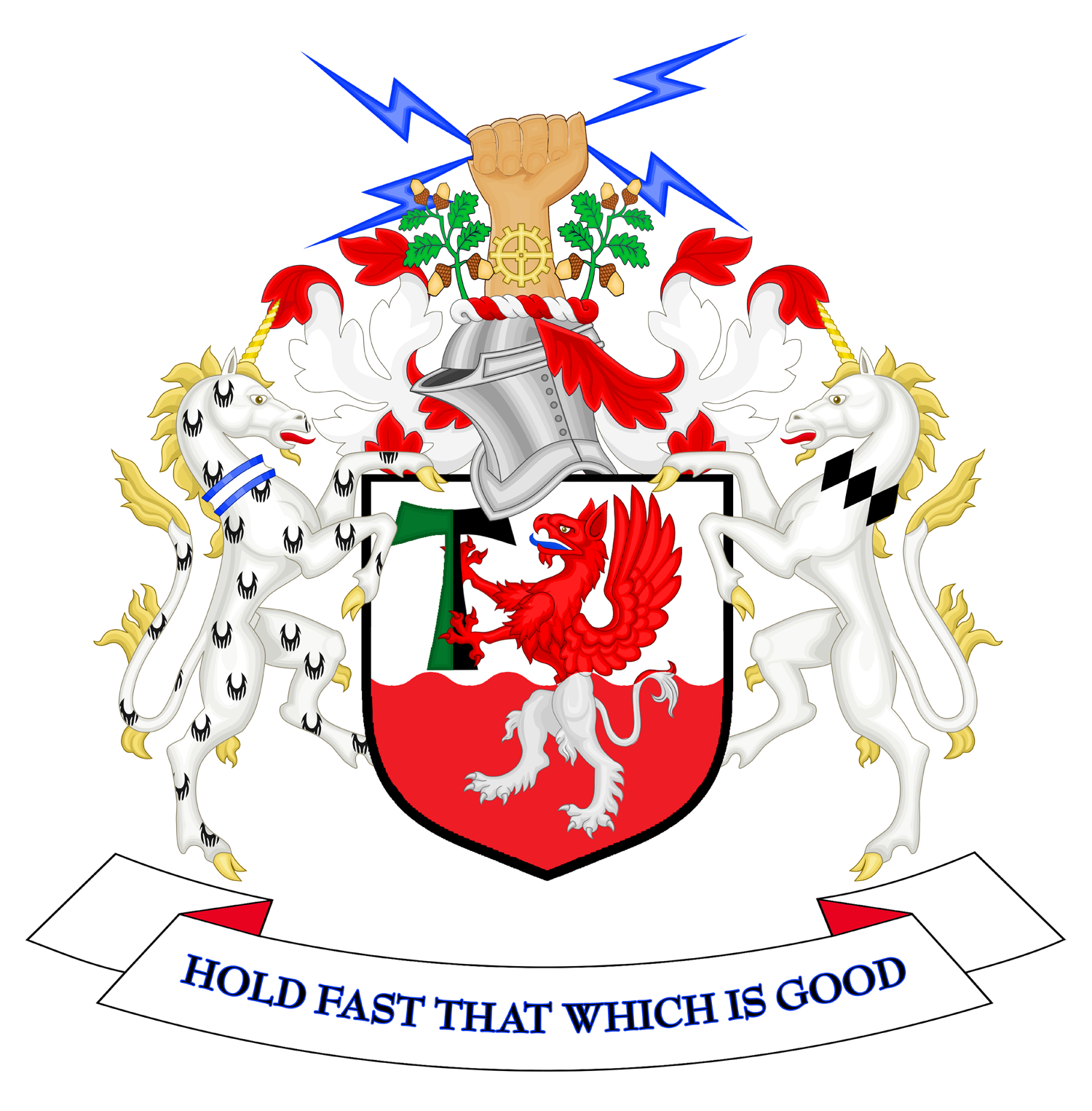
- 3 May 1979

23 of 63 seats to Trafford Metropolitan Borough Council 32 seats needed for a majority
	First party	Second party	Third party
Leader	Jonathan Taylor	Richard Mee	John Phillipson
Party	Conservative	Labour	Liberal
Leader's seat	Brooklands	Sale Moor	St. Anne's
Last election	19 seats, 58.5%	4 seats, 27.9%	0 seats, 13.4%
Seats before	54	9	0
Seats won	15	6	2
Seats after	48	13	2
Seat change	▼6	▲4	▲2
Popular vote	58,913	40,095	30,793
Percentage	45.4%	30.9%	23.7%
Swing	▼13.1%	▲3.0%	▲10.3%
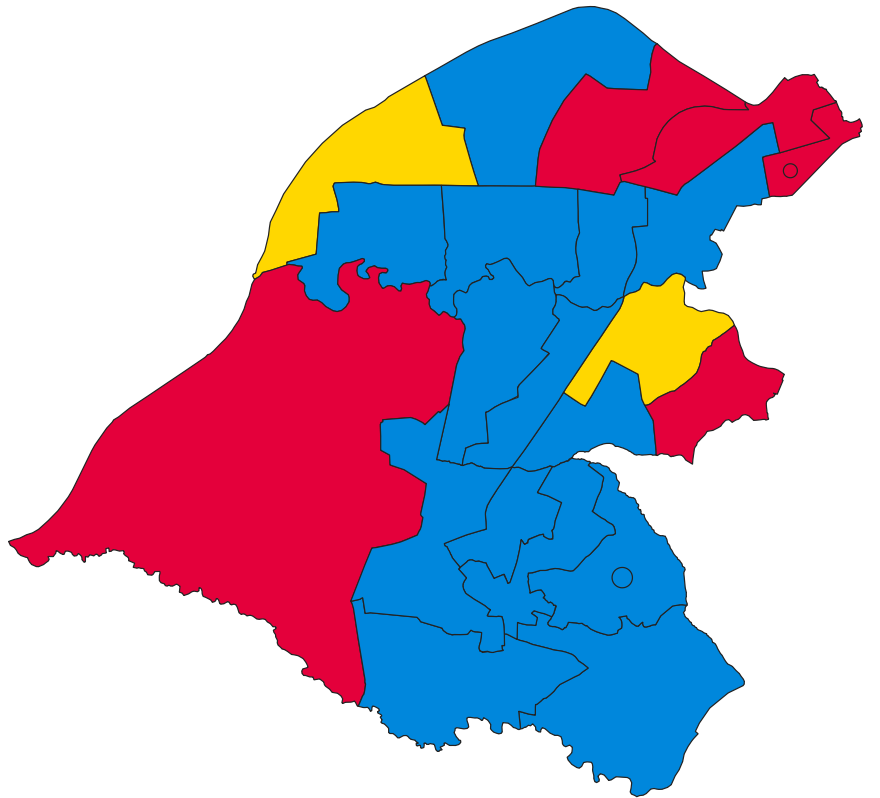
- Map of results of 1979 election
Leader of the Council before election
Jonathan Taylor
Conservative
Leader of the Council after election
Jonathan Taylor
Conservative

Elections to Trafford Council were held on Thursday, 3 May 1979, on the same day as the 1979 UK General Election. One third of the council was up for election, with each successful candidate to serve a four-year term of office, expiring in 1983. The Conservative Party retained overall control of the council.

== Election result ==
Party	Votes		Seats			Full Council	
Conservative Party	58,913 (45.4%)	▼13.1	15 (65.2%)	15 / 23	▼6	48 (76.2%)	48 / 63
Labour Party	40,095 (30.9%)	▲3.0	6 (26.1%)	6 / 23	▲4	13 (20.6%)	13 / 63
Liberal Party	30,793 (23.7%)	▲10.3	2 (8.7%)	2 / 23	▲2	2 (3.2%)	2 / 63
Communist Party	41 (0.0%)	▼0.2	0 (0.0%)	0 / 23	0	0 (0.0%)	0 / 63

↓
13	2	48

== Ward results ==
=== No.1 (Altrincham South West) ===
Altrincham South West
Party	Candidate	Votes	%	±%
Conservative	Albert Whitehurst*	2,384	53.2	−1.2
Liberal	M. C. Booth	2,093	46.8	+29.6
Majority		291	6.5	−19.5
Turnout		4,477	69.5	+36.7
Conservative hold		Swing		

=== No.2 (Altrincham East) ===
Altrincham East
Party	Candidate	Votes	%	±%
Conservative	H. Taylor*	3,608	50.6	−6.5
Liberal	Roy Richardson	3,516	49.4	+18.1
Majority		92	1.3	−10.3
Turnout		7,124	76.4	+38.6
Conservative hold		Swing		

=== No.3 (Altrincham North) ===
Altrincham North
Party	Candidate	Votes	%	±%
Conservative	Lydia Burton*	2,336	45.6	−10.0
Labour	E. Smith	1,555	30.3	+4.7
Liberal	B. Gaylard	1,236	24.1	+5.3
Majority		781	15.2	+1.6
Turnout		5,127	77.3	+41.8
Conservative hold		Swing		

=== No.4 (Timperley) ===
Timperley (2 vacancies)
Party	Candidate	Votes	%	±%
Conservative	Graham Toft	2,756	50.6	−18.6
Conservative	Wilfred Watkins	2,550	46.8	−22.4
Liberal	Raymond Bowker	2,190	40.2	N/A
Labour	Barry Brotherton	1,718	31.5	+0.7
Labour	P. Pollard	1,680	30.8	0
Majority		360	6.6	−24.6
Turnout		5,449	65.7	+34.5
Conservative hold		Swing		
Conservative hold		Swing		

=== No.5 (Mersey-St. Mary’s) ===
Mersey-St. Mary's
Party	Candidate	Votes	%	±%
Conservative	Reginald Bannister*	3,873	54.4	−5.0
Liberal	E. Critchlow	2,055	28.9	+2.7
Labour	C. Younghusband	1,186	16.7	+2.3
Majority		1,818	25.6	−7.6
Turnout		7,114	78.6	+37.6
Conservative hold		Swing		

=== No.6 (St. Martin’s) ===
St. Martin's
Party	Candidate	Votes	%	±%
Conservative	Stanley Brownhill*	4,198	47.3	−15.6
Labour	G. Woodburn	2,554	28.8	+7.6
Liberal	G. C. Kinsey	2,127	24.0	+10.4
Majority		1,644	18.5	−23.2
Turnout		8,879	75.0	+39.7
Conservative hold		Swing		

=== No.7 (Sale Moor) ===
Sale Moor
Party	Candidate	Votes	%	±%
Labour	Cicely Merry	2,319	46.4	−6.1
Conservative	Anthony Rhodes*	1,935	38.7	−8.8
Liberal	J. S. Green	743	14.9	+14.9
Majority		384	7.7	+2.7
Turnout		4,997	75.2	+34.3
Labour gain from Conservative		Swing		

=== No.8 (St. Anne’s) ===
St. Anne's
Party	Candidate	Votes	%	±%
Liberal	John Phillipson	2,657	41.7	+4.9
Conservative	A. D. Barker	2,486	39.0	−8.5
Labour	H. Pollard	1,228	19.3	+3.6
Majority		171	2.7	−8.0
Turnout		6,371	75.3	+34.9
Liberal gain from Conservative		Swing		

=== No.9 (Brooklands) ===
Brooklands
Party	Candidate	Votes	%	±%
Conservative	Jonathan Taylor*	uncontested		
Conservative hold		Swing		

=== No.10 (Talbot North) ===
Talbot North
Party	Candidate	Votes	%	±%
Labour	Clifford Cronshaw*	3,339	56.5	−5.0
Conservative	J. R. Gregory	2,065	34.9	−3.6
Liberal	W. A. Munden	509	8.6	+8.6
Majority		1,274	21.5	−1.6
Turnout		5,913	69.0	+35.7
Labour hold		Swing		

=== No.11 (Clifford) ===
Clifford (2 vacancies)
Party	Candidate	Votes	%	±%
Labour	John Maher	2,129	52.1	+2.1
Labour	Tony Lloyd	2,066	50.5	+0.5
Conservative	Roy Corke*	1,809	44.2	−5.9
Conservative	M. Shafi	1,154	28.2	−21.9
Liberal	D. A. Curley	563	13.8	N/A
Liberal	A. Scanlon	451	11.0	N/A
Majority		257	6.3	
Turnout		4,089	60.1	+20.5
Labour gain from Conservative		Swing		
Labour hold		Swing		

=== No.12 (Longford) ===
Longford
Party	Candidate	Votes	%	±%
Conservative	Alexander Kelly*	3,091	44.5	−9.2
Labour	Maureen Cottam	2,852	41.1	+4.6
Liberal	H. D. Locksley	1,002	14.4	+4.6
Majority		239	3.4	−13.7
Turnout		6,945	72.7	+38.3
Conservative hold		Swing		

=== No.13 (Stretford) ===
Stretford
Party	Candidate	Votes	%	±%
Conservative	Harry Walker*	2,480	53.8	−14.7
Labour	C. Reid	1,608	34.9	+3.4
Liberal	R. J. Allan	521	11.3	+11.3
Majority		872	18.9	−18.1
Turnout		4,609	78.0	+38.0
Conservative hold		Swing		

=== No.14 (Park) ===
Park
Party	Candidate	Votes	%	±%
Labour	A. R. Davies	2,198	51.7	+1.8
Conservative	John Schofield*	1,659	39.0	−9.0
Liberal	C. R. Hedley	354	8.3	+8.3
Communist	E. H. Hook	41	1.0	−1.1
Majority		539	12.7	+10.8
Turnout		4,252	75.2	+36.1
Labour gain from Conservative		Swing		

=== No.15 (Bowdon) ===
Bowdon
Party	Candidate	Votes	%	±%
Conservative	John Humphreys*	3,721	64.7	−12.9
Liberal	J. A. Willmott	1,250	21.7	+9.4
Labour	Arthur Johnson	782	13.6	+3.5
Majority		2,471	43.0	−22.3
Turnout		5,753	76.9	+32.2
Conservative hold		Swing		

=== No.16 (Hale) ===
Hale
Party	Candidate	Votes	%	±%
Conservative	Norman Barrett*	5,098	69.3	−6.4
Liberal	J. S. Whittingham	1,361	18.5	+5.0
Labour	O. J. Spencer	897	12.2	+1.4
Majority		3,737	50.8	−11.4
Turnout		7,356	78.8	+38.9
Conservative hold		Swing		

=== No.17 (Partington) ===
Partington
Party	Candidate	Votes	%	±%
Labour	Kenneth Rogers	3,402	61.7	+1.7
Conservative	Michael Barltrop*	2,112	38.3	−1.7
Majority		1,290	23.4	+3.4
Turnout		5,514	70.3	+36.9
Labour gain from Conservative		Swing		

=== No.18 (Urmston West East) ===
Urmston West East
Party	Candidate	Votes	%	±%
Conservative	Anthony Platt*	3,381	50.8	−8.0
Labour	D. Horner	1,801	27.1	−1.6
Liberal	D. E. Unwin	1,469	22.1	+9.6
Majority		1,580	23.8	−6.3
Turnout		6,651	77.7	+43.1
Conservative hold		Swing		

=== No.19 (Flixton East Central) ===
Flixton East Central
Party	Candidate	Votes	%	±%
Conservative	Gordon Lumby*	4,023	53.3	−18.8
Labour	J. D. Brown	2,295	30.4	+2.5
Liberal	R. K. Sangster	1,226	16.3	+16.3
Majority		1,728	22.9	−21.3
Turnout		7,544	80.9	+47.7
Conservative hold		Swing		

=== No.20 (Flixton West) ===
Flixton West
Party	Candidate	Votes	%	±%
Liberal	Susan Hodgson	4,748	60.7	+60.7
Labour	Raymond Tully	3,071	39.3	+1.9
Majority		1,677	21.4	−3.8
Turnout		7,819	75.0	+39.2
Liberal gain from Conservative		Swing		

=== No.21 (Davyhulme East) ===
Davyhulme East
Party	Candidate	Votes	%	±%
Conservative	Eric Crosbie*	2,194	50.7	−11.1
Labour	G. R. Scott	1,415	32.7	+11.9
Liberal	T. M. Owen	722	16.7	−0.7
Majority		779	18.0	−22.9
Turnout		4,331	79.6	+42.9
Conservative hold		Swing		

== By-elections between 1979 and 1980 ==
No.12 (Longford) By-Election 30 August 1979
Party	Candidate	Votes	%	±%
Labour	Maureen Cottam	1,187	42.7	+1.6
Conservative	John Schofield	1,127	40.5	−4.0
Liberal	H. D. Locksley	466	16.8	+2.4
Majority		60	2.2	−1.2
Turnout		2,780	29.1	−43.6
Labour gain from Conservative		Swing		

No.20 (Flixton West) By-Election 13 December 1979
Party	Candidate	Votes	%	±%
Conservative	David Harding	858	41.3	+41.3
Labour	A. Stringer	752	36.2	+3.1
Liberal	L. O'Rourke	466	22.4	−38.3
Majority		106	5.1	−16.3
Turnout		2,076	20.0	−55.0
Conservative hold		Swing		
