= Brooklands (Trafford ward) =

Brooklands (Trafford)
- Electoral ward
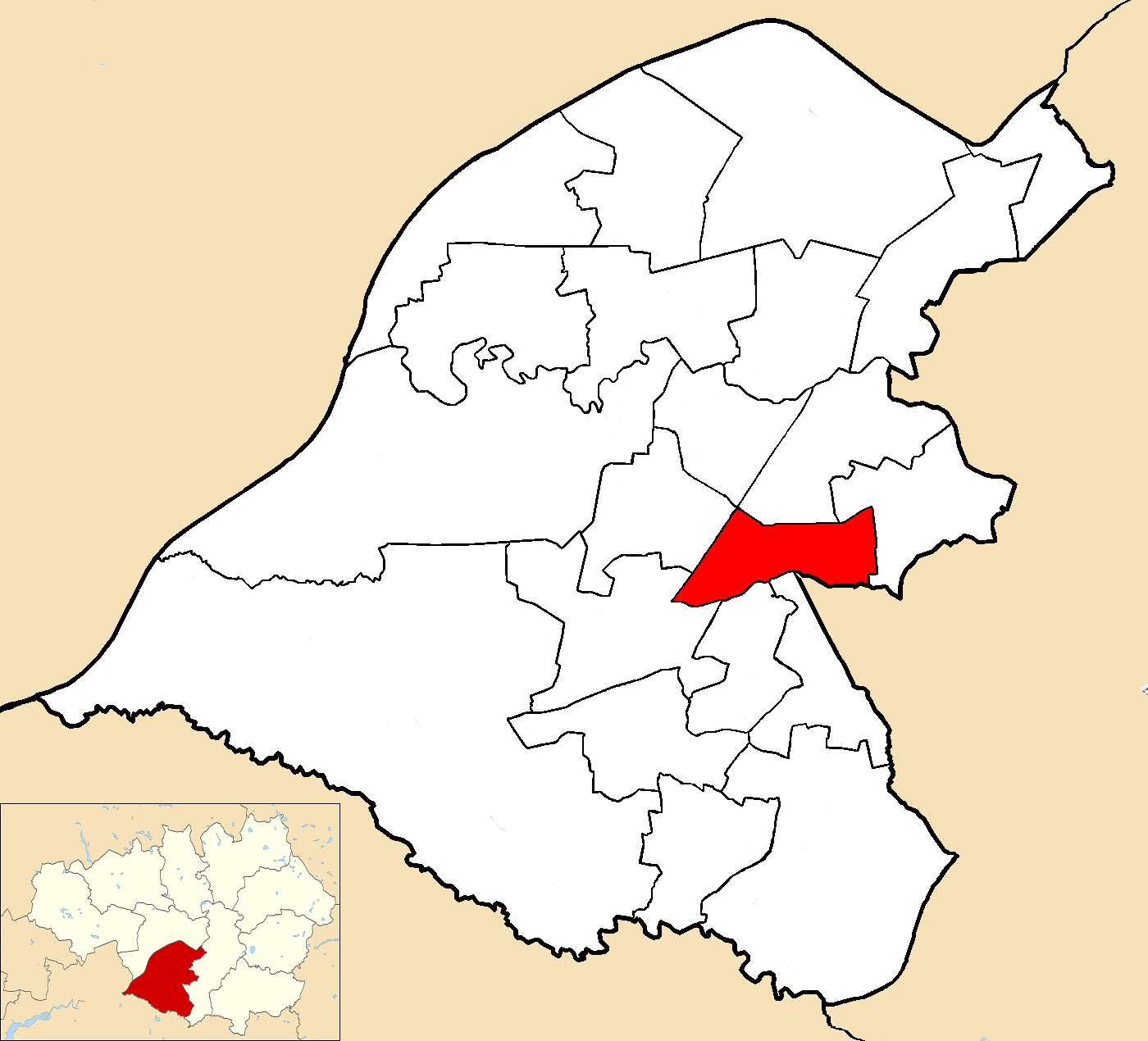
- Brooklands within Trafford

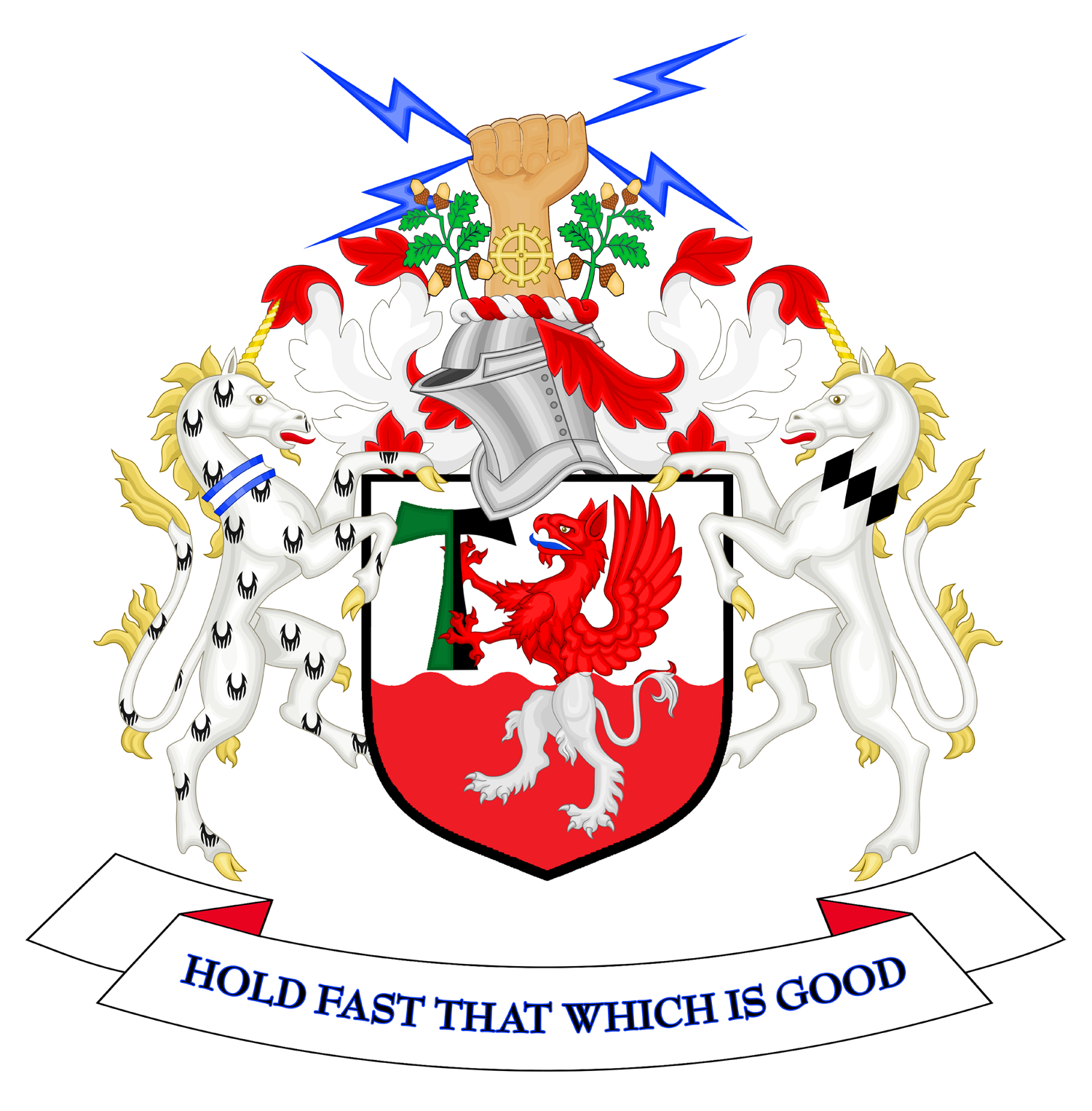
- Coat of arms
- Motto: Hold fast that which is good
- Interactive map of Brooklands (Trafford)
- Coordinates: 53.4153°N 2.3184°W
- Country: United Kingdom
- Constituent country: England
- Region: Trafford
- County: Greater Manchester
- Created: May 1973
- Named for: Brooklands, Sale

Government UK Parliament constituency: Wythenshawe and Sale East
  - Type: Unicameral
  - Body: Trafford Metropolitan Borough Council
  - Leader of the council: Tom Ross (Labour)
  - Councillor: Will Jones (Labour)
  - Councillor: Rose Thompson (Labour)
  - Councillor: Bilal Babar (Labour)

Population
  - Total: 10,434
- Area and population statistics from the 2011 Census

Brooklands is an electoral ward of Trafford, Greater Manchester, covering the south-east of the town of Sale, including most of the Brooklands, Sale area. It is represented in Westminster by Mike Kane MP for Wythenshawe and Sale East The 2011 Census recorded a population of 10,434.

== Councillors ==
As of 2022, the councillors are Will Jones (Labour), Rose Thompson (Labour), and Chris Boyes (Conservative).

Election	Councillor	Councillor	Councillor
1973	Cecil Fink (Lib)	Moira Horlock (Lib)	Sydney Evans (Lib)
1975	Cecil Fink (Lib)	Moira Horlock (Lib)	Jonathan Taylor (Con)
1976	Cecil Fink (Lib)	J. Ludlam (Con)	Jonathan Taylor (Con)
1978	Jack Waterfall (Con)	J. Ludlam (Con)	Jonathan Taylor (Con)
1979	Jack Waterfall (Con)	J. Ludlam (Con)	Jonathan Taylor (Con)
1980	Jack Waterfall (Con)	J. Ludlam (Con)	Jonathan Taylor (Con)
1982	Jack Waterfall (Con)	J. Ludlam (Con)	Jonathan Taylor (Con)
1983	Jack Waterfall (Con)	J. Ludlam (Con)	Jonathan Taylor (Con)
1984	Jack Waterfall (Con)	R. Barber (Con)	Jonathan Taylor (Con)
1986	Jack Waterfall (Con)	R. Barber (Con)	Jonathan Taylor (Con)
1987	Jack Waterfall (Con)	R. Barber (Con)	Jonathan Taylor (Con)
1988	Margaret Cox (Con)	R. Barber (Con)	Jonathan Taylor (Con)
1990	J. Chesney (Con)	R. Barber (Con)	Jonathan Taylor (Con)
1991	J. Chesney (Con)	R. Barber (Con)	S. Hartland (Con)
1992	J. Chesney (Con)	Jonathan Taylor (Con)	David Silverman (Con)
1994	R. Barber (Con)	Jonathan Taylor (Con)	David Silverman (Con)
1995	R. Barber (Con)	Jonathan Taylor (Con)	Pam Dixon (Con)
1996	R. Barber (Con)	C. Lynch (Con)	Pam Dixon (Con)
1998	David Higgins (Con)	C. Lynch (Con)	Pam Dixon (Con)
1999	David Higgins (Con)	C. Lynch (Con)	Pam Dixon (Con)
2000	David Higgins (Con)	Kathy Bullock (Con)	Pam Dixon (Con)
2002	David Higgins (Con)	Kathy Bullock (Con)	Pam Dixon (Con)
2003	David Higgins (Con)	Kathy Bullock (Con)	Pam Dixon (Con)
2004	Kathy Bullock (Con)	David Higgins (Con)	Pam Dixon (Con)
2006	Kathy Bullock (Con)	David Higgins (Con)	Pam Dixon (Con)
2007	Kathy Bullock (Con)	David Higgins (Con)	Pam Dixon (Con)
2008	Kathy Bullock (Con)	David Higgins (Con)	Pam Dixon (Con)
2010	Kathy Bullock (Con)	David Higgins (Con)	Pam Dixon (Con)
2011	Kathy Bullock (Con)	David Higgins (Con)	Pam Dixon (Con)
2012	Chris Boyes (Con)	David Higgins (Con)	Pam Dixon (Con)
2014	Chris Boyes (Con)	David Higgins (Con)	Pam Dixon (Con)
2015	Chris Boyes (Con)	David Hopps (Con)	Pam Dixon (Con)
2016	Chris Boyes (Con)	David Hopps (Con)	Pam Dixon (Con)
2018	Chris Boyes (Con)	David Hopps (Con)	Steven Longden (Lab)
2019	Chris Boyes (Con)	Rose Thompson (Lab)	Steven Longden (Lab)
2021	Chris Boyes (Con)	Rose Thompson (Lab)	Steven Longden (Lab)
2022	Chris Boyes (Con)	Rose Thompson (Lab)	Will Jones (Lab)
2023	Will Jones (Lab)	Rose Thompson (Lab)	Bilal Babar (Lab)
2024	Will Jones (Lab)	Rose Thompson (Lab)	Bilal Babar (Lab)

Indicates seat up for election.

== Elections in the 2020s ==
=== May 2026 ===
2026
Party	Candidate	Votes	%	±%
Labour	Rose Thompson*	1,417	31.9	−15.4
Conservative	Bheem Pulla	1,149	25.9	−4.9
Reform	John Churchill	811	18.3	+11.7
Green	Renate Aspden	783	17.7	+8.5
Liberal Democrats	Pauline Cliff	262	5.9	+0.2
Majority		268	6.0	−10.5
Rejected ballots		11	0.2	-0.3
Turnout		4,436	56.6	+6.9
Registered electors		7,837		
Labour hold		Swing	-5.3	

=== May 2024 ===
2024
Party	Candidate	Votes	%	±%
Labour	Bilal Babar*	1,819	47.3	+0.2
Conservative	Christopher Halliday	1,184	30.8	−7.2
Green	Renate Aspden	354	9.2	−0.8
Reform	Dan Barker	255	6.6	N/A
Liberal Democrats	Pauline Cliff	218	5.7	−2.0
Majority		635	16.5	+10.0
Rejected ballots		18	0.5	+0.1
Turnout		3,848	49.7	−1.5
Registered electors		7,738		
Labour hold		Swing	+3.7	

=== May 2023 ===
2023 (3)
Party	Candidate	Votes	%	±%
Labour	Will Jones*	1,852	47.1%	
Labour	Rose Thompson*	1,850	47.1%	
Labour	Bilal Babar	1,749	44.5%	
Conservative	Chris Boyes*	1,494	38.0%	
Conservative	Dan Barker	1,459	37.1%	
Conservative	Adrian Hart	1,370	34.9%	
Green	Renate Aspden	393	10.0%	
Green	Deborah Leftwich	382	9.7%	
Green	Robert Cutforth	315	8.0%	
Liberal Democrats	Pauline Cliff	301	7.7%	
Majority				
Rejected ballots		15	0.4%	
Turnout		3,930	51.2%	
Registered electors		7,678		

=== May 2022 ===
2022
Party	Candidate	Votes	%	±%
Labour	Will Jones	1,953	49.9	
Conservative	Adrian Hart	1,501	38.3	
Green	Renate Aspden	247	6.3	
Liberal Democrats	Pauline Cliff	202	5.2	
Majority		452	11.5	
Registered electors		7,717		
Turnout		3,915	50.7	
Labour hold		Swing		

=== May 2021 ===
2021
Party	Candidate	Votes	%	±%
Conservative	Chris Boyes*	1,894	44.5	▼7.2
Labour	Fianna Hornby	1,875	44.1	▲7.4
Green	Joe Ryan	255	6.0	▲3.1
Liberal Democrats	Pauline Cliff	206	4.8	▼3.6
Majority		19	0.4	▼14.5
Rejected ballots		25		
Registered electors		7,831		
Turnout		4,255	54.3	▲10.1
Conservative hold		Swing	▼7.3	

== Elections in the 2010s ==
=== May 2019 ===
2019
Party	Candidate	Votes	%	±%
Labour	Rose Thompson	1,587	43.3	▲10.4
Conservative	Michelle McGrath	1,295	35.4	▼16.7
Green	Joe Ryan	309	8.4	▲1.7
Liberal Democrats	Pauline Cliff	298	8.1	▼0.2
UKIP	Tony Nayler	174	4.8	N/A
Majority		292	3.4	
Registered electors		7,735		
Turnout		3,663	47.6	▼24.2
Labour gain from Conservative		Swing	▲13.6	

Change in vote share compared to May 2015.

=== May 2018 ===
2018
Party	Candidate	Votes	%	±%
Labour	Steven Longden	1,939	47.6	▲14.1
Conservative	Mike Jefferson	1,755	43.1	▼8.7
Liberal Democrats	Meenakshi Minnis	170	4.2	▼2.2
Green	Mandy King	155	3.8	▼5.3
UKIP	Tony Nayler	55	1.4	N/A
Majority		184	4.5	
Registered electors		7,844		
Turnout		4,080	52.0	▲11.0
Labour gain from Conservative		Swing	▲11.4	

Change in vote share compared to May 2014.

=== May 2016 ===
2016
Party	Candidate	Votes	%	±%
Conservative	Chris Boyes*	1,766	51.7	▲3.7
Labour	Serena Carr	1,256	36.7	▲3.9
Liberal Democrats	Meenakshi Minnis	287	8.4	▲1.7
Green	Joseph Ryan	100	2.9	▼5.5
Majority		510	14.9	▼0.2
Turnout		3,419	44.2	▲5.6
Conservative hold		Swing	▼0.1	

Change in vote share compared to May 2012.

=== May 2015 ===
2015
Party	Candidate	Votes	%	±%
Conservative	David Hopps	2,952	52.1	▼0.6
Labour	Gary Keary	1,868	32.9	▲1.9
Liberal Democrats	James Eisen	472	8.3	▼2.1
Green	Joseph Ryan	378	6.7	▲0.7
Majority		1,084	19.2	▼2.5
Turnout		5,670	71.8	▲24.1
Conservative hold		Swing	▼1.6	

Change in vote share compared to May 2011.

=== May 2014 ===
2014
Party	Candidate	Votes	%	±%
Conservative	Pam Dixon*	1,627	51.8	▲5.0
Labour	Mike Green	1,052	33.5	▲8.0
Green	Joe Ryan	286	9.1	▲5.9
Liberal Democrats	James Eisen	200	6.4	▼18.1
Majority		575	18.3	▼3.0
Turnout		3,139	41.0	▼30.0
Conservative hold		Swing	▼1.5	

Change in vote share compared to May 2010.

=== May 2012 ===
2012
Party	Candidate	Votes	%	±%
Conservative	Chris Boyes	1,421	48.1	▼12.4
Labour	Louise Dagnall	972	32.9	▲15.1
Green	David Eatock	247	8.4	▲2.1
Liberal Democrats	Michael McDonald	197	6.7	▼9.8
Independent	Colin Bearfield	117	4.0	N/A
Majority		449	15.2	▼28.5
Turnout		2,954	38.6	▼0.3
Conservative hold		Swing	▼13.8	

Change in vote share compared to May 2008.

=== May 2011 ===
2011
Party	Candidate	Votes	%	±%
Conservative	David Higgins*	1,995	52.7	▼3.5
Labour	Lewis Dagnall	1,172	31.0	▲14.0
Liberal Democrats	John O'Connor	393	10.4	▼9.1
Green	Joseph Ryan	226	6.0	▼1.3
Majority		823	21.7	▼15.0
Turnout		3,786	47.7	▲7.4
Conservative hold		Swing	▼8.9	

Change in vote share compared to May 2007.

=== May 2010 ===
2010
Party	Candidate	Votes	%	±%
Conservative	Pam Dixon*	2,648	46.8	▼12.7
Labour	Angela Gratrix	1,444	25.5	▲8.7
Liberal Democrats	John O'Connor	1,389	24.5	▲0.7
Green	Joseph Ryan	179	3.2	N/A
Majority		1,204	21.3	▼14.4
Turnout		5,660	71.0	▲32.1
Conservative hold		Swing	▼10.7	

Change in vote share compared to May 2006.

== Elections in the 2000s ==
2008
Party	Candidate	Votes	%	±%
Conservative	Kathy Bullock*	1,883	60.5	+4.3
Labour	Angela Gratrix	522	17.8	+0.8
Liberal Democrats	Kenneth Clarke	514	16.5	−3.0
Green	Barbara Jarkowski	196	6.3	−1.0
Majority		1,361	43.7	+7.0
Turnout		3,115	38.9	+2.2
Conservative hold		Swing		

2007
Party	Candidate	Votes	%	±%
Conservative	David Higgins*	1,769	56.2	−3.3
Liberal Democrats	Kenneth Clarke	614	19.5	−4.3
Labour	David Hampson	536	17.0	+0.2
Green	Nicola Campling	229	7.3	+7.3
Majority		1,155	36.7	+1.0
Turnout		3,148	40.3	+1.4
Conservative hold		Swing		

2006
Party	Candidate	Votes	%	±%
Conservative	Pamela Dixon*	1,808	59.5	−20.7
Liberal Democrats	Kenneth Clarke	722	23.8	+7.3
Labour	Angela Gratrix	509	16.8	+16.8
Majority		1,086	35.7	+10.3
Turnout		3,039	38.9	−10.5
Conservative hold		Swing		

2004 (after boundary changes)
Party	Candidate	Votes	%	±%
Conservative	Kathleen Bullock*	2,196	27.9	
Conservative	David Higgins*	2,154	27.4	
Conservative	Pamela Dixon*	1,962	24.9	
Liberal Democrats	David Rhodes	1,296	16.5	
BNP	Andrew Harris	260	3.3	
Turnout		7,868	49.4	
Conservative win (new seat)				
Conservative win (new seat)				
Conservative win (new seat)				

2003
Party	Candidate	Votes	%	±%
Conservative	Pamela Dixon*	2,247	47.6	−9.0
Liberal Democrats	Kenneth Clarke	1,149	24.3	+6.8
Labour	Joanne Bennett	1,083	22.9	−3.0
Green	Stephen Parker	245	5.2	+5.2
Majority		1,098	23.3	−7.4
Turnout		4,724	61.3	+7.0
Conservative hold		Swing		

2002
Party	Candidate	Votes	%	±%
Conservative	David Higgins*	2,378	56.6	−9.7
Labour	Philip Morgan	1,086	25.9	+5.3
Liberal Democrats	Kenneth Clarke	737	17.5	+4.4
Majority		1,292	30.7	−15.0
Turnout		4,201	54.3	+16.4
Conservative hold		Swing		

2000
Party	Candidate	Votes	%	±%
Conservative	Kathleen Bullock	1,986	66.3	+5.2
Labour	Ian McDermott	618	20.6	−6.2
Liberal Democrats	Kenneth Clarke	393	13.1	+1.0
Majority		1,368	45.7	+11.4
Turnout		2,997	37.9	+1.1
Conservative hold		Swing		

== Elections in the 1990s ==
1999
Party	Candidate	Votes	%	±%
Conservative	Dixon*	1,779	61.1	−0.8
Labour	Bennett	780	26.8	−0.7
Liberal Democrats	YR Clarke	353	12.1	+1.5
Majority		999	34.3	−0.1
Turnout		2,912	36.8	−1.5
Conservative hold		Swing		

1998
Party	Candidate	Votes	%	±%
Conservative	D. R. Higgins	1,879	61.9	+12.9
Labour	J. Bagnoli	833	27.5	−8.3
Liberal Democrats	Y. R. Clarke	322	10.6	−4.6
Majority		1,046	34.4	−21.3
Turnout		3,034	38.3	−3.8
Conservative hold		Swing		

1996
Party	Candidate	Votes	%	±%
Conservative	C. J. J. Lynch	1,626	49.0	−0.9
Labour	J. A. Lloyd	1,190	35.8	+8.7
Liberal Democrats	K. Clarke	505	15.2	+1.6
Majority		436	13.1	−9.7
Turnout		3,321	42.1	−2.7
Conservative hold		Swing		

1995
Party	Candidate	Votes	%	±%
Conservative	P. A. Dixon	1,815	49.9	+1.5
Labour	P. Frizzby	986	27.1	+6.1
Liberal Democrats	C. Marchbank-Smith	493	13.6	−16.9
Independent	D. F. Cockayne	343	9.4	+9.4
Majority		829	22.8	+4.9
Turnout		3,637	44.8	−0.5
Conservative hold		Swing		

1994
Party	Candidate	Votes	%	±%
Conservative	R. Barber	1,736	48.4	−20.1
Liberal Democrats	A. Rhodes	1,095	30.5	+14.2
Labour	T. G. Crewe	754	21.0	+7.9
Majority		641	17.9	−33.7
Turnout		3,585	45.3	−6.3
Conservative hold		Swing		

1992 (2 vacancies)
Party	Candidate	Votes	%	±%
Conservative	J. Taylor	2,302	34.5	+2.7
Conservative	D. F. Silverman	2,264	34.0	+2.2
Liberal Democrats	A. Rhodes	544	8.2	−2.4
Liberal Democrats	W. Rhodes	541	8.1	−2.5
Labour	D. G. Kirkland	455	6.8	−0.8
Labour	P. Miller	420	6.3	−1.3
Green	V. Birdsall	141	2.1	+2.1
Majority		1,720	51.6	+9.0
Turnout		6,667	43.1	−0.5
Conservative hold		Swing		
Conservative hold		Swing		

1991
Party	Candidate	Votes	%	±%
Conservative	S. J. Hartland	2,596	63.7	+3.2
Liberal Democrats	K. F. Humber	862	21.2	+6.7
Labour	W. Stennett	615	15.1	−4.8
Majority		1,734	42.6	+2.1
Turnout		4,073	50.7	+0.4
Conservative hold		Swing		

1990
Party	Candidate	Votes	%	±%
Conservative	J. Chesney	2,467	60.5	−8.5
Labour	W. Stennett	813	19.9	+5.0
Liberal Democrats	K. F. Humber	590	14.5	−1.6
Green	R. I. Unsworth	209	5.1	+5.1
Majority		1,654	40.5	−10.3
Turnout		4,079	50.3	+2.2
Conservative hold		Swing		

== Elections in the 1980s ==
1988 (2 vacancies)
Party	Candidate	Votes	%	±%
Conservative	R. Barber*	2,630	35.2	+12.1
Conservative	M. C. R. Cox	2,528	33.8	+9.3
Liberal Democrats	C. A. Bearfield	630	8.4	−14.6
Liberal Democrats	K. F. Humber	579	7.7	−16.0
Labour	L. J. Hargadon	565	7.6	+4.9
Labour	E. D. Shaw	543	7.3	+4.3
Majority		1,898	25.4	−1.4
Turnout		7,475	48.1	−8.6
Conservative hold		Swing		
Conservative hold		Swing		

1987
Party	Candidate	Votes	%	±%
Conservative	J. Taylor*	2,679	58.3	+8.0
SDP	B. M. Keeley-Huggett	1,445	31.4	−4.8
Labour	E. D. Shaw	474	10.3	−3.2
Majority		1,234	26.8	+12.7
Turnout		4,598	56.7	+10.7
Conservative hold		Swing		

1986
Party	Candidate	Votes	%	±%
Conservative	J. A. E. Waterfall*	1,881	50.3	−1.2
Alliance	C. S. Fink	1,354	36.2	−1.0
Labour	E. D. Shaw	507	13.5	+2.2
Majority		527	14.1	−0.2
Turnout		3,742	46.0	+0.4
Conservative hold		Swing		

1984
Party	Candidate	Votes	%	±%
Conservative	R. Barber	1,892	51.5	−11.8
Liberal	C. S. Fink	1,365	37.2	+12.4
Labour	L. T. Murkin	416	11.3	−0.7
Majority		527	14.3	−24.2
Turnout		3,673	45.6	−6.0
Conservative hold		Swing		

1983
Party	Candidate	Votes	%	±%
Conservative	J. Taylor*	2,630	63.3	−0.1
Liberal	G. M. R. Willmott	1,029	24.8	−0.7
Labour	R. P. F. Phillips	497	12.0	+0.9
Majority		1,601	38.5	+0.6
Turnout		4,156	51.6	+2.5
Conservative hold		Swing		

1982
Party	Candidate	Votes	%	±%
Conservative	J. A. E. Waterfall*	2,489	63.4	+10.9
Liberal	C. A. Bearfield	1,000	25.5	−9.4
Labour	H. Davies	437	11.1	−1.5
Majority		1,489	37.9	+20.3
Turnout		3,926	49.1	−1.1
Conservative hold		Swing		

1980
Party	Candidate	Votes	%	±%
Conservative	J. B. Ludlam*	2,107	52.5	−11.3
Liberal	C. A. Bearfield	1,401	34.9	+8.8
Labour	J. Shaw	507	12.6	+2.5
Majority		706	17.6	+3.3
Turnout		4,015	50.2	+3.1
Conservative hold		Swing		

== Elections in the 1970s ==
1979
Party	Candidate	Votes	%	±%
Conservative	J. Taylor*	uncontested		
Conservative hold		Swing		

1978
Party	Candidate	Votes	%	±%
Conservative	J. A. E. Waterfall	2,685	63.8	−1.0
Liberal	C. S. Fink*	1,098	26.1	−9.1
Labour	A. J. Hadley	426	10.1	+10.1
Majority		1,587	37.7	+8.2
Turnout		4,209	47.1	+1.9
Conservative gain from Liberal		Swing		

1976
Party	Candidate	Votes	%	±%
Conservative	J. B. Ludlam	2,393	64.8	+6.8
Liberal	H. Hughes	1,302	35.2	+1.5
Majority		1,091	29.5	+5.3
Turnout		3,695	45.2	−0.5
Conservative gain from Liberal		Swing		

1975
Party	Candidate	Votes	%	±%
Conservative	J. Taylor	2,362	58.0	
Liberal	S. Evans*	1,375	33.7	
Labour	E. P. M. Wollaston	338	8.3	
Majority		987	24.2	
Turnout		4,075	45.7	
Conservative gain from Liberal		Swing		

1973
Party	Candidate	Votes	%	±%
Liberal	C. S. Fink	2,073	50.9	
Liberal	M. Horlock	2,027		
Liberal	S. Evans	1,905		
Conservative	A. Goodliffe	1,878	46.1	
Conservative	J. Fergusson	1,796		
Conservative	A. Long	1,723		
Communist	B. Panter	120	2.9	
Majority		27		
Turnout		4,071	43.4	
Liberal win (new seat)				
Liberal win (new seat)				
Liberal win (new seat)				
