= Bucklow (ward) =

Former electoral ward of Trafford, Greater Manchester, England

Bucklow was an electoral ward of Trafford covering the town of Partington and the village of Carrington.

The ward was abolished in 2004, and most of its area incorporated into the new Bucklow-St. Martins Ward.

== Councillors ==
| Election | Councillor | Councillor | Councillor |
|---|---|---|---|
| 1973 | Frank Holland (Lab) | J. Paul (Lab) | B. Nutter (Lab) |
| 1975 | Frank Holland (Lab) | J. Paul (Lab) | Michael Barltrop (Con) |
| 1976 | Frank Holland (Lab) | J. Paul (Lab) | Michael Barltrop (Con) |
| 1978 | Frank Holland (Lab) | J. Paul (Lab) | Michael Barltrop (Con) |
| 1979 | Frank Holland (Lab) | J. Paul (Lab) | Ken Rogers (Lab) |
| 1980 | Frank Holland (Lab) | J. Paul (Lab) | Ken Rogers (Lab) |
| 1982 | Frank Holland (Lab) | J. Paul (Lab) | Ken Rogers (Lab) |
| 1983 | Frank Holland (Lab) | J. Paul (Lab) | Ken Rogers (Lab) |
| 1984 | Frank Holland (Lab) | J. Paul (Lab) | Ken Rogers (Lab) |
| 1986 | Frank Holland (Lab) | J. Paul (Lab) | Ken Rogers (Lab) |
| 1987 | Frank Holland (Lab) | J. Paul (Lab) | Ken Rogers (Lab) |
| 1988 | Frank Holland (Lab) | J. Paul (Lab) | Ken Rogers (Lab) |
| May 1989 | Frank Holland (Ind) | J. Paul (Lab) | Ken Rogers (Lab) |
| 1990 | Frank Holland (Ind) | J. Paul (Lab) | Ken Rogers (Lab) |
| 1991 | Frank Holland (Ind) | J. Paul (Lab) | Ken Rogers (Lab) |
| Mar 1992 | Frank Holland (Lib Dem) | J. Paul (Lab) | Ken Rogers (Lab) |
| May 1992 | Frank Holland (Lib Dem) | Harry Faulkner (Lab) | Ken Rogers (Lab) |
| 1994 | Sheila Batty (Lab) | Harry Faulkner (Lab) | Ken Rogers (Lab) |
| 1995 | Sheila Batty (Lab) | Harry Faulkner (Lab) | Ken Rogers (Lab) |
| 1996 | Sheila Batty (Lab) | Harry Faulkner (Lab) | Ken Rogers (Lab) |
| 1998 | Graham Kanes (Lab) | Harry Faulkner (Lab) | Ken Rogers (Lab) |
| 1999 | Graham Kanes (Lab) | Harry Faulkner (Lab) | Ian Platt (Lab) |
| 2000 | Graham Kanes (Lab) | Harry Faulkner (Lab) | Ian Platt (Lab) |
| 2002 | Graham Kanes (Lab) | Harry Faulkner (Lab) | Ian Platt (Lab) |
| 2003 | Graham Kanes (Lab) | Harry Faulkner (Lab) | Ian Platt (Lab) |

== Elections in the 2000s ==
2003
| Party | Candidate | Votes | % | ±% |
|---|---|---|---|---|
| Labour | Ian Platt* | 1,749 | 74.7 | −0.6 |
| Conservative | James Davies | 592 | 25.3 | +0.6 |
| Majority | | 1,157 | 49.4 | −1.2 |
| Turnout | | 2,341 | 41.3 | +0.3 |
| Labour hold | | Swing | | |

2002
| Party | Candidate | Votes | % | ±% |
|---|---|---|---|---|
| Labour | Graham Kanes* | 1,759 | 75.3 | +2.6 |
| Conservative | James Davies | 576 | 24.7 | −2.6 |
| Majority | | 1,183 | 50.6 | +5.2 |
| Turnout | | 2,335 | 41.0 | +22.4 |
| Labour hold | | Swing | | |

2000
| Party | Candidate | Votes | % | ±% |
|---|---|---|---|---|
| Labour | Harry Faulkner* | 800 | 72.7 | −8.0 |
| Conservative | Alexander Kelly | 300 | 27.3 | +13.3 |
| Majority | | 500 | 45.4 | −21.3 |
| Turnout | | 1,100 | 18.6 | −1.2 |
| Labour hold | | Swing | | |

== Elections in the 1990s ==
1999
| Party | Candidate | Votes | % | ±% |
|---|---|---|---|---|
| Labour | Platt | 943 | 80.7 | −5.3 |
| Conservative | Kelly | 164 | 14.0 | +14.0 |
| Liberal Democrats | Frankland | 61 | 5.2 | +5.2 |
| Majority | | 779 | 66.7 | −12.6 |
| Turnout | | 1,168 | 19.8 | −0.3 |
| Labour hold | | Swing | | |

1998
| Party | Candidate | Votes | % | ±% |
|---|---|---|---|---|
| Labour | G. G. Kanes | 1,029 | 86.0 | +3.4 |
| Independent | S. Finch | 80 | 6.7 | +6.7 |
| Independent | M. E. Hindley | 45 | 3.8 | +3.8 |
| Independent | G. Hindley | 42 | 3.5 | +3.5 |
| Majority | | 949 | 79.3 | +20.5 |
| Turnout | | 1,196 | 20.1 | −7.4 |
| Labour hold | | Swing | | |

1996
| Party | Candidate | Votes | % | ±% |
|---|---|---|---|---|
| Labour | H. Faulkner* | 1,394 | 82.6 | +5.3 |
| Independent | F. Holland | 149 | 8.8 | −13.9 |
| Conservative | H. L. Wilde | 145 | 8.6 | +8.6 |
| Majority | | 993 | 58.8 | +4.2 |
| Turnout | | 1,688 | 27.5 | −5.6 |
| Labour hold | | Swing | | |

1995
| Party | Candidate | Votes | % | ±% |
|---|---|---|---|---|
| Labour | K. Rogers* | 1,566 | 77.3 | +22.1 |
| Independent | F. Holland | 461 | 22.7 | +22.7 |
| Majority | | 1,105 | 54.6 | +44.2 |
| Turnout | | 2,027 | 33.1 | −5.9 |
| Labour hold | | Swing | | |

1994
| Party | Candidate | Votes | % | ±% |
|---|---|---|---|---|
| Labour | S. M. Batty | 1,368 | 55.2 | −13.7 |
| Liberal Democrats | F. Holland* | 1,111 | 44.8 | +13.7 |
| Majority | | 257 | 10.4 | −27.5 |
| Turnout | | 2,479 | 39.0 | +10.0 |
| Labour gain from Liberal Democrats | | Swing | | |

1992
| Party | Candidate | Votes | % | ±% |
|---|---|---|---|---|
| Labour | H. Faulkner | 1,263 | 68.9 | +14.3 |
| Liberal Democrats | Y. S. Robertson | 569 | 31.1 | +31.1 |
| Majority | | 694 | 37.9 | +16.8 |
| Turnout | | 1,832 | 29.0 | −5.9 |
| Labour hold | | Swing | | |

1991
| Party | Candidate | Votes | % | ±% |
|---|---|---|---|---|
| Labour | K. Rogers* | 1,263 | 54.6 | +29.1 |
| Independent | Y. S. Robertson | 774 | 33.4 | +33.4 |
| Conservative | B. J. Shannon | 277 | 12.0 | +0.1 |
| Majority | | 489 | 21.1 | −9.9 |
| Turnout | | 2,314 | 34.9 | −10.1 |
| Labour hold | | Swing | | |

1990
| Party | Candidate | Votes | % | ±% |
|---|---|---|---|---|
| Independent | F. Holland* | 1,658 | 56.5 | +56.5 |
| Labour | P. Miller | 749 | 25.5 | −54.0 |
| Conservative | B. J. Shannon | 348 | 11.9 | +11.9 |
| Green | A. Miller | 180 | 6.1 | +6.1 |
| Majority | | 909 | 31.0 | −28.0 |
| Turnout | | 2,935 | 45.0 | +17.7 |
| Independent hold | | Swing | | |

== Elections in the 1980s ==
1988
| Party | Candidate | Votes | % | ±% |
|---|---|---|---|---|
| Labour | J. D. Paul* | 1,456 | 79.5 | +16.4 |
| Liberal Democrats | R. M. Elliott | 376 | 20.5 | +6.4 |
| Majority | | 1,080 | 59.0 | +18.7 |
| Turnout | | 1,832 | 27.3 | −11.2 |
| Labour hold | | Swing | | |

1987
| Party | Candidate | Votes | % | ±% |
|---|---|---|---|---|
| Labour | K. Rogers* | 1,673 | 63.1 | −16.9 |
| Conservative | K. G. Hindley | 604 | 22.8 | +2.8 |
| Liberal | C. Martin | 374 | 14.1 | +14.1 |
| Majority | | 1,069 | 40.3 | −19.6 |
| Turnout | | 2,651 | 38.5 | +6.8 |
| Labour hold | | Swing | | |

1986
| Party | Candidate | Votes | % | ±% |
|---|---|---|---|---|
| Labour | F. Holland* | 1,747 | 80.0 | +24.4 |
| Conservative | M. E. Hindley | 438 | 20.0 | +7.2 |
| Majority | | 1,309 | 59.9 | +20.0 |
| Turnout | | 2,185 | 31.7 | −6.1 |
| Labour hold | | Swing | | |

1984
| Party | Candidate | Votes | % | ±% |
|---|---|---|---|---|
| Labour | J. D. Paul* | 1,451 | 55.6 | −12.3 |
| Independent | F. M. Woods | 408 | 15.6 | +15.6 |
| Conservative | M. E. Hindley | 335 | 12.8 | −8.0 |
| Independent | R. Bennett | 323 | 12.4 | +12.4 |
| Liberal | J. Preston | 94 | 3.6 | −7.7 |
| Majority | | 1,043 | 39.9 | −7.2 |
| Turnout | | 2,611 | 37.8 | +0.8 |
| Labour hold | | Swing | | |

1983
| Party | Candidate | Votes | % | ±% |
|---|---|---|---|---|
| Labour | K. Rogers* | 1,738 | 67.9 | +5.2 |
| Conservative | M. E. Hindley | 532 | 20.8 | +1.1 |
| Alliance | A. C. Halliday | 289 | 11.3 | −6.3 |
| Majority | | 1,206 | 47.1 | +4.1 |
| Turnout | | 2,559 | 37.0 | +2.2 |
| Labour hold | | Swing | | |

1982
| Party | Candidate | Votes | % | ±% |
|---|---|---|---|---|
| Labour | F. Holland* | 1,533 | 62.7 | −17.7 |
| Conservative | M. E. Hindley | 482 | 19.7 | +6.7 |
| SDP | A. P. Ratcliff | 429 | 17.6 | +17.6 |
| Majority | | 1,051 | 43.0 | −24.4 |
| Turnout | | 2,444 | 34.8 | −1.6 |
| Labour hold | | Swing | | |

1980
| Party | Candidate | Votes | % | ±% |
|---|---|---|---|---|
| Labour | J. D. Paul* | 2,067 | 80.4 | +18.7 |
| Conservative | I. S. Balcombe | 334 | 13.0 | −25.3 |
| Liberal | B. Wilson | 169 | 6.6 | +6.6 |
| Majority | | 1,733 | 67.4 | +44.0 |
| Turnout | | 2,570 | 36.4 | −33.9 |
| Labour hold | | Swing | | |

== Elections in the 1970s ==
1979
| Party | Candidate | Votes | % | ±% |
|---|---|---|---|---|
| Labour | K. Rogers | 3,402 | 61.7 | +1.7 |
| Conservative | M. J. Barltrop* | 2,112 | 38.3 | −1.7 |
| Majority | | 1,290 | 23.4 | +3.4 |
| Turnout | | 5,514 | 70.3 | +36.9 |
| Labour gain from Conservative | | Swing | | |

1978
| Party | Candidate | Votes | % | ±% |
|---|---|---|---|---|
| Labour | F. Holland* | 1,566 | 60.0 | +11.3 |
| Conservative | J. Strong | 1,043 | 40.0 | −0.1 |
| Majority | | 523 | 20.0 | +11.3 |
| Turnout | | 2,609 | 33.4 | −4.0 |
| Labour hold | | Swing | | |

1976
| Party | Candidate | Votes | % | ±% |
|---|---|---|---|---|
| Labour | J. D. Paul* | 1,438 | 48.7 | +2.1 |
| Conservative | M. E. Hindley | 1,182 | 40.1 | −6.7 |
| Communist | P. S. Gallagher | 139 | 4.7 | −1.9 |
| Independent | W. J. Graham | 120 | 4.1 | +4.1 |
| Independent | K. M. Stewart | 72 | 2.4 | +2.4 |
| Majority | | 256 | 8.7 | +8.5 |
| Turnout | | 2,951 | 37.4 | +9.8 |
| Labour hold | | Swing | | |

1975
| Party | Candidate | Votes | % | ±% |
|---|---|---|---|---|
| Conservative | M. J. Barltrop | 996 | 46.8 | |
| Labour | C. Younghusband | 991 | 46.6 | |
| Communist | E. J. Wilkinson | 140 | 6.6 | |
| Majority | | 5 | 0.2 | |
| Turnout | | 2,127 | 27.6 | |
| Conservative gain from Labour | | Swing | | |

1973
| Party | Candidate | Votes | % | ±% |
|---|---|---|---|---|
| Labour | F. Holland | 1,277 | 45.8 | |
| Labour | J. D. Paul | 1,228 | | |
| Labour | B. G. Nutter | 1,158 | | |
| Liberal | A. Appleton | 690 | 24.8 | |
| Independent | M. Sharkey | 621 | 22.3 | |
| Communist | E. Wilkinson | 199 | 7.1 | |
| Majority | | 461 | | |
| Turnout | | 2,787 | 24.0 | |
| Labour win (new seat) | | | | |
| Labour win (new seat) | | | | |
| Labour win (new seat) | | | | |
