= 1976 Trafford Metropolitan Borough Council election =

1976 UK local government election

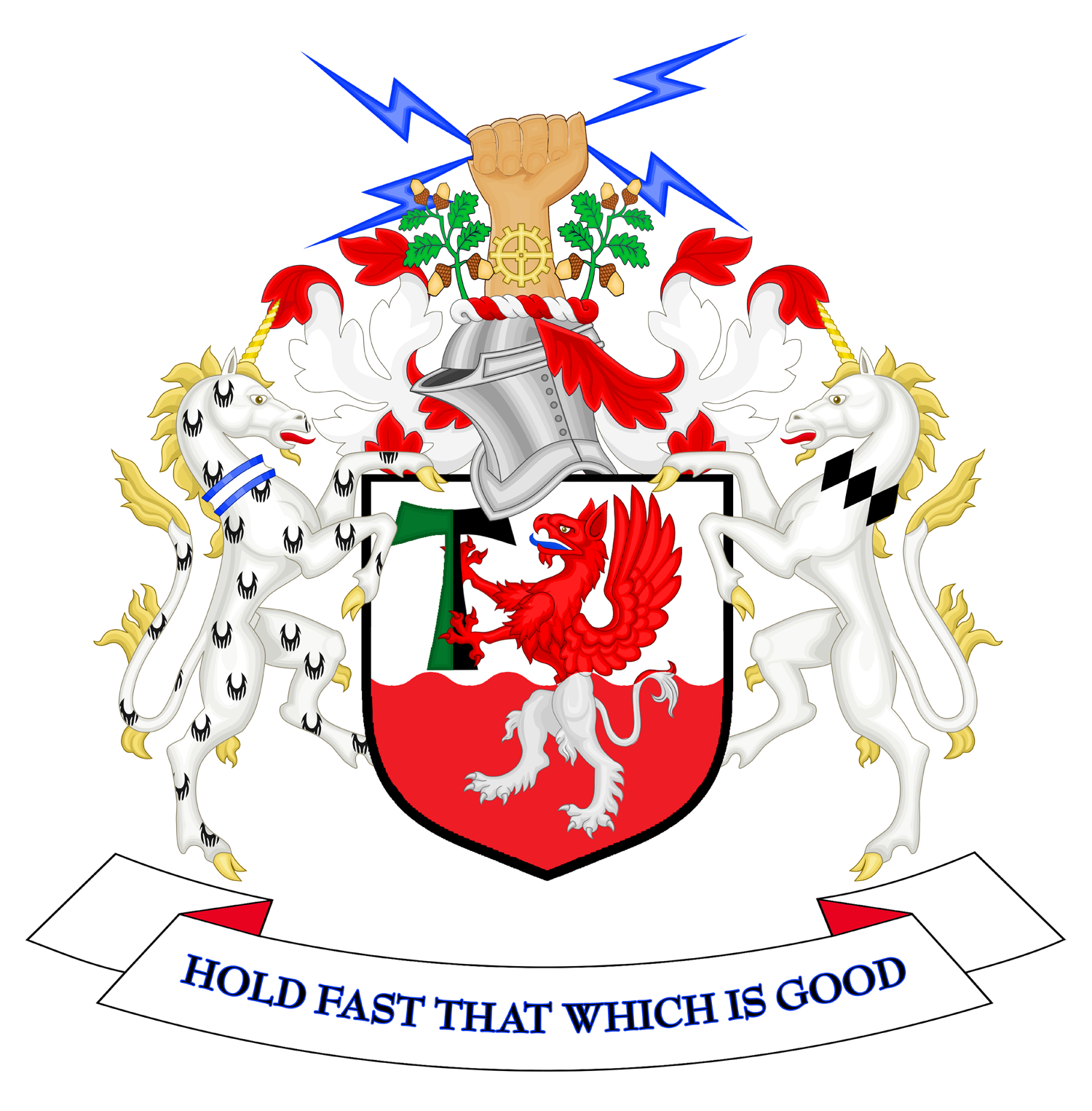
- 6 May 1976

21 of 63 seats to Trafford Metropolitan Borough Council 32 seats needed for a majority
| | First party | Second party | Third party |
|---|---|---|---|
| Leader | Colin Warbrick | Bert Pyper | Cecil Fink |
| Party | Conservative | Labour | Liberal |
| Leader's seat | Stretford | Park | Brooklands |
| Last election | 21 seats, 56.1% | 1 seat, 22.2% | 0 seats, 21.3% |
| Seats before | 42 | 13 | 8 |
| Seats won | 17 | 4 | 0 |
| Seats after | 47 | 12 | 4 |
| Seat change | ▲5 | ▼1 | ▼4 |
| Popular vote | 40,753 | 19,344 | 10,421 |
| Percentage | 57.4% | 27.3% | 14.7% |
| Swing | ▲1.3% | ▲5.1% | ▼6.6% |
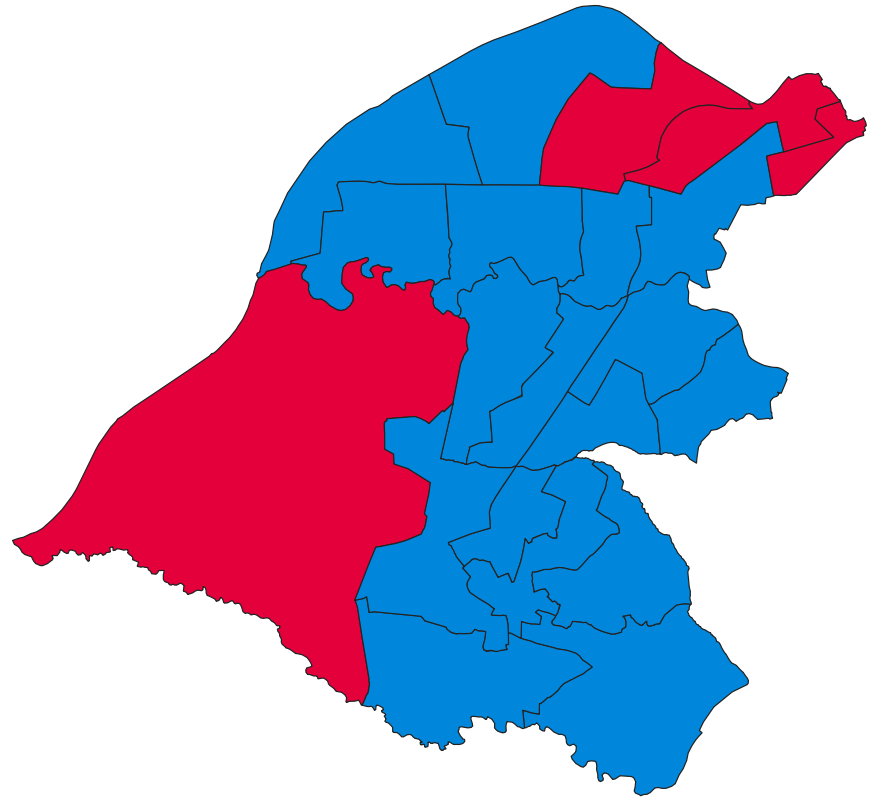
- Map of results of 1976 election
Leader of the Council before election
Mike King
Conservative
Leader of the Council after election
Colin Warbrick
Conservative

Elections to Trafford Council were held on Thursday, 6 May 1976. One third of the council was up for election, with each successful candidate to serve a four-year term of office, expiring in 1980. The Conservative Party retained overall control of the council.

== Election result ==
| Party | Votes | | Seats | | | Full Council | |
| Conservative Party | 40,753 (57.4%) | ▲1.3 | 17 (81.0%) | 17 / 21 | ▲5 | 47 (74.6%) | 47 / 63 |
| Labour Party | 19,344 (27.3%) | ▲5.1 | 4 (19.0%) | 4 / 21 | ▼1 | 12 (19.0%) | 12 / 63 |
| Liberal Party | 10,421 (14.7%) | ▼6.6 | 0 (0.0%) | 0 / 21 | ▼4 | 4 (6.3%) | 4 / 63 |
| Communist Party | 263 (0.4%) | Steady | 0 (0.0%) | 0 / 21 | 0 | 0 (0.0%) | 0 / 63 |
| Independent | 192 (0.3%) | N/A | 0 (0.0%) | 0 / 21 | N/A | 0 (0.0%) | 0 / 63 |

↓
| 12 | 4 | 47 |

== Ward results ==
=== No.1 (Altrincham South West) ===
Altrincham South West
| Party | Candidate | Votes | % | ±% |
|---|---|---|---|---|
| Conservative | Catherine Gordon | 1,373 | 53.5 | +10.6 |
| Labour | E. Axon | 687 | 26.8 | −0.2 |
| Liberal | P. C. Feanhley | 506 | 19.7 | −10.4 |
| Majority | | 686 | 26.7 | +13.9 |
| Turnout | | 2,566 | 40.3 | −1.3 |
| Conservative hold | | Swing | | |

=== No.2 (Altrincham East) ===
Altrincham East
| Party | Candidate | Votes | % | ±% |
|---|---|---|---|---|
| Conservative | Roy Hall | 2,209 | 54.5 | +6.8 |
| Liberal | Glen Stuart | 1,153 | 28.4 | −8.9 |
| Labour | Robert Coulthard | 691 | 17.0 | +2.0 |
| Majority | | 1,056 | 26.1 | +15.6 |
| Turnout | | 4,053 | 42.6 | −2.2 |
| Conservative gain from Liberal | | Swing | | |

=== No.3 (Altrincham North) ===
Altrincham North
| Party | Candidate | Votes | % | ±% |
|---|---|---|---|---|
| Conservative | Richard Finch | 1,610 | 54.3 | +6.4 |
| Liberal | Eric Faulkner | 719 | 24.3 | −3.4 |
| Labour | Alan Hadley | 635 | 21.4 | −2.9 |
| Majority | | 891 | 30.1 | +9.9 |
| Turnout | | 2,964 | 45.0 | +0.9 |
| Conservative hold | | Swing | | |

=== No.4 (Timperley) ===
Timperley
| Party | Candidate | Votes | % | ±% |
|---|---|---|---|---|
| Conservative | Audrey Weedall | 1,695 | 47.6 | −0.3 |
| Liberal | Raymond Bowker* | 983 | 27.6 | +5.8 |
| Labour | J. Gregory | 884 | 24.8 | −5.4 |
| Majority | | 712 | 20.0 | +2.3 |
| Turnout | | 3,562 | 44.5 | +1.9 |
| Conservative gain from Liberal | | Swing | | |

=== No.5 (Mersey-St. Mary’s) ===
Mersey-St. Mary's
| Party | Candidate | Votes | % | ±% |
|---|---|---|---|---|
| Conservative | Ivor Hurst* | 2,451 | 60.8 | +4.3 |
| Liberal | R. Elliott | 1,184 | 29.4 | −14.1 |
| Labour | Raymond Tully | 393 | 9.8 | +9.8 |
| Majority | | 1,267 | 31.5 | +18.4 |
| Turnout | | 4,028 | 45.0 | +3.6 |
| Conservative hold | | Swing | | |

=== No.6 (St. Martin’s) ===
St. Martin's
| Party | Candidate | Votes | % | ±% |
|---|---|---|---|---|
| Conservative | Peter Morgan Evans* | 2,778 | 66.8 | −2.3 |
| Labour | G. T. Pollitt | 1,378 | 33.2 | +2.3 |
| Majority | | 1,400 | 33.7 | −4.4 |
| Turnout | | 4,156 | 38.2 | +7.8 |
| Conservative hold | | Swing | | |

=== No.7 (Sale Moor) ===
Sale Moor
| Party | Candidate | Votes | % | ±% |
|---|---|---|---|---|
| Conservative | S. D. Turner | 1,231 | 43.9 | +1.5 |
| Labour | Barry Brotherton | 1,221 | 43.6 | +9.5 |
| Liberal | B. Willshaw | 301 | 10.7 | −10.4 |
| Communist | V. T. Eddisford | 49 | 1.7 | −0.6 |
| Majority | | 10 | 0.4 | −4.7 |
| Turnout | | 2,802 | 42.1 | +2.7 |
| Conservative gain from Labour | | Swing | | |

=== No.8 (St. Anne’s) ===
St. Anne's
| Party | Candidate | Votes | % | ±% |
|---|---|---|---|---|
| Conservative | John Sutton | 1,789 | 46.4 | −0.9 |
| Liberal | John Golding* | 1,208 | 31.3 | −3.2 |
| Labour | J. K. Morgan | 858 | 22.3 | +4.1 |
| Majority | | 581 | 15.1 | +2.2 |
| Turnout | | 3,855 | 45.3 | +4.3 |
| Conservative gain from Liberal | | Swing | | |

=== No.9 (Brooklands) ===
Brooklands
| Party | Candidate | Votes | % | ±% |
|---|---|---|---|---|
| Conservative | J. B. Ludlam | 2,393 | 64.8 | +6.8 |
| Liberal | Hilary Hughes | 1,302 | 35.2 | +1.5 |
| Majority | | 1,091 | 29.5 | +5.3 |
| Turnout | | 3,695 | 45.2 | −0.5 |
| Conservative gain from Liberal | | Swing | | |

=== No.10 (Talbot North) ===
Talbot North
| Party | Candidate | Votes | % | ±% |
|---|---|---|---|---|
| Labour | Daniel Sullivan* | 1,786 | 52.8 | +7.2 |
| Conservative | T. W. Thompson | 1,143 | 33.8 | +3.0 |
| Liberal | T. A. Dixon | 451 | 13.3 | −10.3 |
| Majority | | 643 | 19.0 | +4.2 |
| Turnout | | 3,380 | 37.9 | +3.0 |
| Labour hold | | Swing | | |

=== No.11 (Clifford) ===
Clifford
| Party | Candidate | Votes | % | ±% |
|---|---|---|---|---|
| Labour | Vincent Wynne* | 1,355 | 49.6 | +6.8 |
| Conservative | Edward Kelson | 1,172 | 42.9 | −14.3 |
| Liberal | R. N. Stott | 206 | 7.5 | +7.5 |
| Majority | | 183 | 6.7 | −7.6 |
| Turnout | | 2,733 | 41.5 | +6.6 |
| Labour hold | | Swing | | |

=== No.12 (Longford) ===
Longford
| Party | Candidate | Votes | % | ±% |
|---|---|---|---|---|
| Conservative | Olive Chandler* | 2,033 | 53.5 | +0.3 |
| Labour | Tony Lloyd | 1,319 | 34.7 | +4.0 |
| Liberal | H. D. Locksley | 446 | 11.7 | −4.4 |
| Majority | | 714 | 18.8 | −3.7 |
| Turnout | | 3,798 | 39.0 | +3.4 |
| Conservative hold | | Swing | | |

=== No.13 (Stretford) ===
Stretford
| Party | Candidate | Votes | % | ±% |
|---|---|---|---|---|
| Conservative | Colin Warbrick* | 1,587 | 64.4 | +1.2 |
| Labour | G. R. Scott | 698 | 28.3 | +3.0 |
| Liberal | C. R. Hedley | 181 | 7.3 | −4.2 |
| Majority | | 889 | 36.1 | −1.8 |
| Turnout | | 2,466 | 42.3 | +3.3 |
| Conservative hold | | Swing | | |

=== No.14 (Park) ===
Park
| Party | Candidate | Votes | % | ±% |
|---|---|---|---|---|
| Labour | Herber Pyper* | 1,353 | 49.9 | +8.3 |
| Conservative | William Matthews | 1,282 | 47.3 | +4.5 |
| Communist | M. A. Murray | 75 | 2.8 | +0.3 |
| Majority | | 71 | 2.6 | +1.4 |
| Turnout | | 2,710 | 43.3 | +3.3 |
| Labour hold | | Swing | | |

=== No.15 (Bowdon) ===
Bowdon
| Party | Candidate | Votes | % | ±% |
|---|---|---|---|---|
| Conservative | Barbara Sutton Hall* | 2,948 | 84.7 | +12.8 |
| Labour | J. Wynne | 534 | 15.3 | +2.7 |
| Majority | | 2,414 | 69.3 | +13.0 |
| Turnout | | 3,482 | 48.6 | −1.3 |
| Conservative hold | | Swing | | |

=== No.16 (Hale) ===
Hale
| Party | Candidate | Votes | % | ±% |
|---|---|---|---|---|
| Conservative | Roy Godwin* | 3,807 | 87.2 | +5.9 |
| Labour | P. Scott | 560 | 12.8 | N/A |
| Majority | | 3,247 | 74.4 | +23.4 |
| Turnout | | 4,367 | 47.4 | +3.8 |
| Conservative hold | | Swing | | |

=== No.17 (Partington) ===
Partington
| Party | Candidate | Votes | % | ±% |
|---|---|---|---|---|
| Labour | John Paul* | 1,438 | 48.7 | +2.1 |
| Conservative | M. E. Hindley | 1,182 | 40.1 | −6.7 |
| Communist | P. S. Gallagher | 139 | 4.7 | −1.9 |
| Independent | W. J. Graham | 120 | 4.1 | +4.1 |
| Independent | K. M. Stewart | 72 | 2.4 | +2.4 |
| Majority | | 256 | 8.7 | +8.5 |
| Turnout | | 2,951 | 37.4 | +9.8 |
| Labour hold | | Swing | | |

=== No.18 (Urmston West East) ===
Urmston West East
| Party | Candidate | Votes | % | ±% |
|---|---|---|---|---|
| Conservative | Ruth Royle-Higginson* | 1,798 | 56.8 | +2.3 |
| Labour | D. T. Taylor | 763 | 24.1 | +0.5 |
| Liberal | A. Scanlon | 604 | 19.1 | −2.8 |
| Majority | | 1,035 | 32.7 | +1.9 |
| Turnout | | 3,165 | 37.6 | −5.7 |
| Conservative hold | | Swing | | |

=== No.19 (Flixton East Central) ===
Flixton East Central
| Party | Candidate | Votes | % | ±% |
|---|---|---|---|---|
| Conservative | Neil Fitzpatrick* | 2,492 | 62.9 | +8.4 |
| Labour | D. J. Watts | 894 | 22.6 | +3.0 |
| Liberal | M. G. Maxfield | 575 | 14.5 | −11.4 |
| Majority | | 1,598 | 40.3 | +11.7 |
| Turnout | | 3,961 | 42.9 | −4.7 |
| Conservative hold | | Swing | | |

=== No.20 (Flixton West) ===
Flixton West
| Party | Candidate | Votes | % | ±% |
|---|---|---|---|---|
| Conservative | A. E. Williams* | 2,432 | 60.4 | +1.5 |
| Labour | Laura Seex | 1,212 | 30.1 | +3.6 |
| Liberal | D. J. Gilbert | 384 | 9.5 | −5.1 |
| Majority | | 1,220 | 30.3 | −2.0 |
| Turnout | | 4,028 | 41.2 | −1.8 |
| Conservative hold | | Swing | | |

=== No.21 (Davyhulme East) ===
Davyhulme East
| Party | Candidate | Votes | % | ±% |
|---|---|---|---|---|
| Conservative | Frank Eadie* | 1,348 | 59.9 | +9.8 |
| Labour | M. F. Treadaway | 685 | 30.4 | +5.2 |
| Liberal | W. A. Munden | 218 | 9.7 | −15.0 |
| Majority | | 663 | 29.5 | +4.6 |
| Turnout | | 2,251 | 41.4 | −0.2 |
| Conservative hold | | Swing | | |

== By-elections between 1976 and 1978 ==
No.4 (Timperley) By-Election 14 October 1976
| Party | Candidate | Votes | % | ±% |
|---|---|---|---|---|
| Conservative | Ronald Holden | 1,307 | 67.1 | +19.5 |
| Labour | J. Gregory | 640 | 32.9 | +8.1 |
| Majority | | 667 | 34.3 | +11.5 |
| Turnout | | 1,947 | 24.3 | −20.2 |
| Conservative gain from Labour | | Swing | | |

No.3 (Altrincham North) By-Election 24 March 1977
| Party | Candidate | Votes | % | ±% |
|---|---|---|---|---|
| Conservative | M. G. Currie | 1,183 | 56.7 | +2.4 |
| Liberal | Eric Faulkner | 579 | 27.7 | −3.4 |
| Labour | P. B. Ayo | 325 | 15.6 | −5.8 |
| Majority | | 604 | 28.9 | −1.2 |
| Turnout | | 2,087 | 31.7 | −13.3 |
| Conservative hold | | Swing | | |

No.6 (St. Martin's) By-Election 24 March 1977
| Party | Candidate | Votes | % | ±% |
|---|---|---|---|---|
| Conservative | T. Almond | 1,862 | 58.7 | −8.1 |
| Labour | Barry Brotherton | 744 | 23.5 | −9.7 |
| Liberal | John Golding | 566 | 17.8 | +17.8 |
| Majority | | 1,118 | 35.2 | +1.5 |
| Turnout | | 3,172 | 28.1 | −10.1 |
| Conservative hold | | Swing | | |
