= 1946 Sale Municipal Borough Council election =

Local election in England

← 1945	1 November 1946	1947 →

8 of 32 seats to Sale Municipal Borough Council 16 seats needed for a majority
	First party	Second party	Third party
Party	Conservative	Labour	Residents
Last election	4 seats, 31.3%	3 seats, 29.8%	1 seats, 18.2%
Seats before	15	6	5
Seats won	7	1	0
Seats after	20	6	4
Seat change	▲5	Steady	▼1
Popular vote	9,978	3,693	2,194
Percentage	59.6%	22.1%	13.1%
Swing	▲28.3%	▼7.7%	▼5.1%
	Fourth party
Party	Independent
Last election	1 seats, 17.8%
Seats before	5
Seats won	0
Seats after	2
Seat change	▼3
Popular vote	0
Percentage	0.0%
Swing	▼17.8%
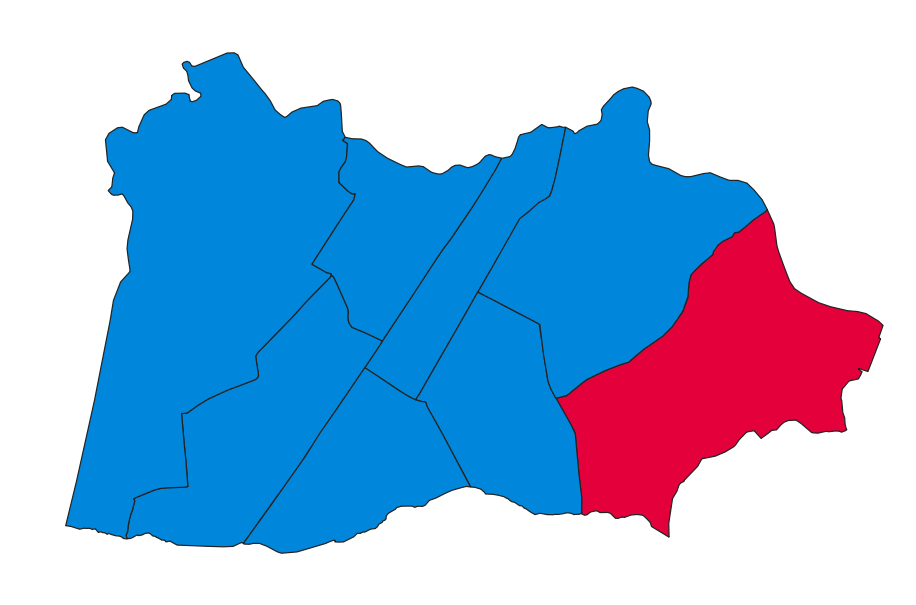
- Map of results of 1946 election
Leader of the Council before election
No overall control
Leader of the Council after election
Conservative

Elections to Sale Council were held on Friday, 1 November 1946. One third of the councillors were up for election, with each successful candidate to serve a three-year term of office. The Conservative Party gained overall control of the council.

== Election result ==
Party	Votes		Seats			Full Council	
Conservative Party	9,978 (59.6%)	▲28.3	7 (87.5%)	7 / 8	▲5	20 (62.5%)	20 / 32
Labour Party	3,693 (22.1%)	▼7.7	1 (12.5%)	1 / 8	Steady	6 (18.8%)	6 / 32
Residents	2,194 (13.1%)	▼5.1	0 (0.0%)	0 / 8	▼1	4 (12.5%)	4 / 32
Independent	0 (0.0%)	▼17.8	0 (0.0%)	0 / 8	▼3	2 (6.3%)	2 / 32
Liberal Party	509 (3.0%)	N/A	0 (0.0%)	0 / 8	N/A	0 (0.0%)	0 / 32
Communist Party	368 (2.2%)	▼0.8	0 (0.0%)	0 / 8	Steady	0 (0.0%)	0 / 32

=== Full council ===
↓
6	4	2	20

=== Aldermen ===
↓
2	6

=== Councillors ===
↓
4	4	2	14

== Ward results ==
=== Brooklands ===
Brooklands
Party	Candidate	Votes	%	±%
Conservative	E. A. Wright	1,317	61.4	+16.2
Residents	J. Kershaw	827	38.6	+1.2
Majority		490	22.8	+15.1
Turnout		2,144		
Conservative gain from Independent		Swing		

=== Mersey ===
Mersey
Party	Candidate	Votes	%	±%
Conservative	R. G. Graham	1,605	64.8	+16.8
Labour	C. Mapp*	872	35.2	−0.2
Majority		733	29.6	
Turnout		2,477		
Conservative gain from Labour		Swing		

=== St. Anne's ===
St. Anne's
Party	Candidate	Votes	%	±%
Conservative	F. D. Gee*	1,547	67.1	N/A
Labour	J. L. Henderson	757	32.9	−5.4
Majority		790	34.3	
Turnout		2,304		
Conservative hold		Swing		

=== St. John's ===
St. John's
Party	Candidate	Votes	%	±%
Conservative	P. Rowles*	1,592	88.3	+16.2
Communist	R. F. A. Nettleton	210	11.7	−16.2
Majority		1,382	76.7	+32.6
Turnout		1,802		
Conservative hold		Swing		

=== St. Martin's ===
St. Martin's
Party	Candidate	Votes	%	±%
Conservative	B. Flinter	1,060	49.6	+6.8
Residents	W. B. Percival*	618	28.9	−1.3
Labour	E. H. Dorber	457	21.4	−5.3
Majority		442	20.7	+8.1
Turnout		2,077		
Conservative gain from Residents		Swing		

=== St. Mary's ===
St. Mary's
Party	Candidate	Votes	%	±%
Conservative	W. D. C. Craven	995	57.1	+29.9
Residents	J. M. Rome	749	42.9	−4.3
Majority		246	14.1	
Turnout		1,744		
Conservative gain from Independent		Swing		

=== St. Paul's ===
St. Paul's
Party	Candidate	Votes	%	±%
Conservative	W. L. Beeby	1,198	53.9	N/A
Labour	H. Dean	868	39.0	−26.4
Communist	J. H. Dodd	158	7.1	N/A
Majority		330	14.8	
Turnout		2,224		
Conservative gain from Independent		Swing		

=== Sale Moor ===
Sale Moor
Party	Candidate	Votes	%	±%
Labour	T. A. Winnington	739	38.7	−17.5
Conservative	A. E. Smith	664	34.7	N/A
Liberal	S. G. Ford	509	26.6	N/A
Majority		75	4.0	−8.4
Turnout		1,912		
Labour gain from Chamber of Trade		Swing		
