= 1935 Sale Municipal Borough Council election =

English local election

- 1 November 1935

24 of 32 seats to Sale Municipal Borough Council 17 seats needed for a majority
	First party	Second party	Third party
Party	Independent	Conservative	Labour
Seats won	15	5	3
Seats after	20	7	4
Popular vote	11,432	4,196	4,359
Percentage	55.8%	20.5%	21.3%
	Fourth party
Party	Chamber of Trade
Seats won	1
Seats after	1
Popular vote	504
Percentage	2.5%
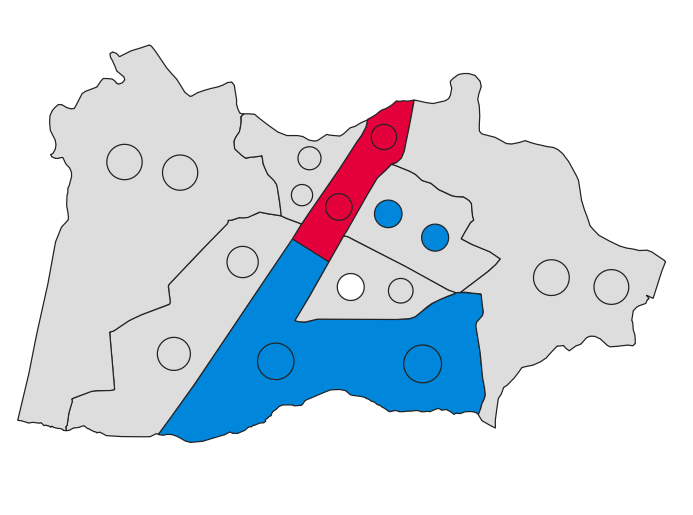
- Map of results of 1935 election
Leader of the Council after election
Independent

The first elections to Sale Council were held on Friday, 1 November 1935. This was a new council to replace Sale Urban District Council. This election would create the entire 32-member council (three councillors to each ward and eight aldermen). Independents won overall control of the council.

== Election result ==
Party	Votes	Seats		Full Council	
Independent	11,432 (55.8%)	15 (62.5%)	15 / 24	20 (62.5%)	20 / 32
Conservative Party	4,196 (20.5%)	5 (20.8%)	5 / 24	7 (21.9%)	7 / 32
Labour Party	4,359 (21.3%)	3 (12.5%)	3 / 24	4 (12.5%)	4 / 32
Chamber of Trade	504 (2.5%)	1 (4.2%)	1 / 24	1 (3.1%)	1 / 32

=== Full council ===
↓
4	20	1	7

=== Aldermen ===
↓
1	5	2

=== Councillors ===
↓
3	15	1	5

== Ward results ==
=== Central ===
Central
Party	Candidate	Votes	%	±%
Independent	J. Paley Parrish*	714	28.8	
Chamber of Trade	M. F. Ratcliffe	504	20.3	
Independent	C. A. Ryder*	455	18.4	
Independent	A. E. Taylor*	451	18.2	
Independent	J. G. McBeath	355	14.3	
Majority		4	0.2	
Turnout		2,479		
Independent win (new seat)				
Chamber of Trade win (new seat)				
Independent win (new seat)				

=== East ===
East
Party	Candidate	Votes	%	±%
Independent	T. Howe*	uncontested		
Independent	R. B. Pettener*	uncontested		
Independent	W. Proctor Smith*	uncontested		
Independent win (new seat)				
Independent win (new seat)				
Independent win (new seat)				

=== Mersey ===
Mersey
Party	Candidate	Votes	%	±%
Independent	M. G. Bird	614	20.7	
Independent	R. P. Bannister	546	18.4	
Independent	A. W. Turner	483	16.3	
Labour	J. W. Thomas*	457	15.4	
Labour	C. Mapp*	445	15.0	
Labour	E. H. Thomas	423	14.3	
Majority		26	0.9	
Turnout		2,968		
Independent win (new seat)				
Independent win (new seat)				
Independent win (new seat)				

=== North ===
North
Party	Candidate	Votes	%	±%
Independent	J. W. Slate*	614	20.3	
Conservative	G. F. Gordon*	574	19.0	
Conservative	J. H. Wilson*	523	17.3	
Independent	F. D. Gee	485	16.0	
Labour	H. C. Wade	459	15.2	
Independent	E. S. Griffis	373	12.3	
Majority		38	1.3	
Turnout		3,028		
Independent win (new seat)				
Conservative win (new seat)				
Conservative win (new seat)				

=== St. Martin's ===
St. Martin's
Party	Candidate	Votes	%	±%
Independent	E. D. Phillips*	843	29.4	
Independent	T. Parker*	821	28.6	
Independent	S. Read*	699	24.4	
Labour	R. G. Thomas	504	17.6	
Majority		195	6.8	
Turnout		2,867		
Independent win (new seat)				
Independent win (new seat)				
Independent win (new seat)				

=== St. Mary's ===
St. Mary's
Party	Candidate	Votes	%	±%
Independent	M. M. Newton*	545	20.9	
Independent	F. J. Atkinson*	537	20.6	
Independent	H. B. Provis	522	20.1	
Independent	G. Gibbon	507	19.5	
Independent	A. Gilbert	493	18.9	
Majority		15	0.6	
Turnout		2,604		
Independent win (new seat)				
Independent win (new seat)				
Independent win (new seat)				

=== South ===
South
Party	Candidate	Votes	%	±%
Conservative	A. W. Mawer*	1,095	27.9	
Conservative	W. H. Wright*	1,091	27.8	
Conservative	E. N. Bowden*	913	23.2	
Independent	P. N. Clough	830	21.1	
Majority		83	2.1	
Turnout		3,929		
Conservative win (new seat)				
Conservative win (new seat)				
Conservative win (new seat)				

=== West ===
West
Party	Candidate	Votes	%	±%
Labour	W. Plant*	774	28.5	
Labour	A. E. Thomson*	705	26.0	
Labour	H. Townend*	692	25.5	
Independent	B. Flinter	545	20.1	
Majority		147	5.4	
Turnout		2,716		
Labour win (new seat)				
Labour win (new seat)				
Labour win (new seat)				

== Aldermanic election ==
Aldermanic elections took place at the council's inaugural meeting on 9 November 1935, all seven of the borough's aldermen were up for election by the council.

Sale Municipal Borough Aldermanic election
Party	Candidate	Votes	%	±%
Independent	F. J. Atkinson*	uncontested		
Conservative	G. F. Gordon*	uncontested		
Independent	T. Howe*	uncontested		
Independent	J. Paley Parrish*	uncontested		
Independent	R. B. Pettener*	uncontested		
Labour	W. Plant*	uncontested		
Independent	J. W. Slate*	uncontested		
Conservative	W. H. Wright*	uncontested		
Independent win (new seat)				
Conservative win (new seat)				
Independent win (new seat)				
Independent win (new seat)				
Independent win (new seat)				
Labour win (new seat)				
Independent win (new seat)				
Conservative win (new seat)				

== By-elections between 1935 and 1936 ==
By-elections were held on 7 December 1935 to fill the vacancies created by the Aldermanic election.

Central By-election 7 December 1935
Party	Candidate	Votes	%	±%
Independent	A. E. Taylor	uncontested		
Independent hold		Swing		

East By-election 7 December 1935 (2 vacancies)
Party	Candidate	Votes	%	±%
Chamber of Trade	J. E. Hilton	550	40.1	N/A
Independent	B. Flinter	422	30.8	N/A
Independent	B. J. Presland	399	29.1	N/A
Majority		23	1.7	
Turnout		1,371		
Chamber of Trade gain from Independent		Swing		
Independent hold		Swing		

North By-election 7 December 1935 (2 vacancies)
Party	Candidate	Votes	%	±%
Independent	F. H. Highley	669	39.8	
Independent	F. D. Gee	581	34.5	
Labour	H. C. Wade	432	25.7	
Majority		149	8.9	
Turnout		1,682		
Independent hold		Swing		
Independent gain from Conservative		Swing		

St. Mary's By-election 7 December 1935
Party	Candidate	Votes	%	±%
Conservative	J. R. Hulme	453	37.4	N/A
Independent	G. Gibbon	391	32.3	
Independent	A. Gilbert	366	30.2	
Majority		62	5.1	
Turnout		1,210		
Conservative gain from Independent		Swing		

South By-election 7 December 1935
Party	Candidate	Votes	%	±%
Independent	P. N. Clough	563	41.6	
Conservative	A. Davies	443	32.7	
Independent	W. Mortimore	348	25.7	
Majority		120	8.9	
Turnout		1,354		
Independent gain from Conservative		Swing		

West By-election 7 December 1935
Party	Candidate	Votes	%	±%
Labour	F. Dickens	529	54.3	
Independent	W. Birch	446	45.7	
Majority		83	8.5	
Turnout		975		
Labour hold		Swing		
