= 1945 Sale Municipal Borough Council election =

1945 English local election

← 1938	1 November 1945	1946 →

9 of 32 seats to Sale Municipal Borough Council 16 seats needed for a majority
	First party	Second party	Third party
Party	Conservative	Labour	Independent
Last election	2 seats, 32.2%	1 seats, 25.7%	2 seats, 25.7%
Seats before	11	4	12
Seats won	4	3	1
Seats after	13	7	7
Seat change	▲2	▲3	▼5
Popular vote	6,228	5,927	3,544
Percentage	31.3%	29.8%	17.8%
Swing	▼0.9%	▲4.1%	▲1.4%
	Fourth party	Fifth party
Party	Residents	Chamber of Trade
Last election		0 seats, 0.0%
Seats before	4	1
Seats won	1	0
Seats after	4	1
Seat change	Steady	Steady
Popular vote	3,617	0
Percentage	18.2%	0.0%
Swing	▼7.5%	Steady
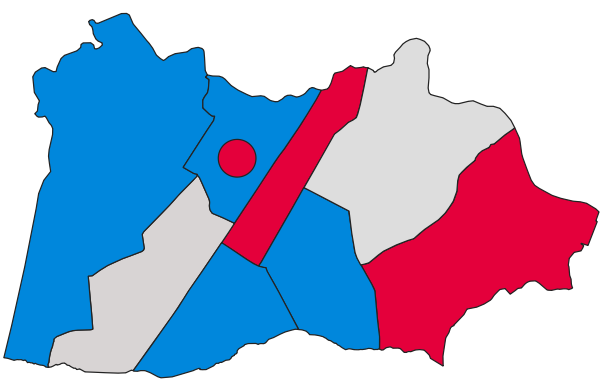
- Map of results of 1945 election
Leader of the Council before election
No overall control
Leader of the Council after election
No overall control

Elections to Sale Council were held on Thursday, 1 November 1945. One third of the councillors were up for election, with each successful candidate to serve a three-year term of office. The council remained under no overall control. These were the first local elections held in Sale since the outbreak of the Second World War.

== Election result ==
Party	Votes		Seats			Full Council	
Conservative Party	6,228 (31.3%)	▼0.9	4 (44.4%)	4 / 9	▲2	13 (40.6%)	13 / 32
Labour Party	5,927 (29.8%)	▲4.1	3 (33.3%)	3 / 9	▲3	7 (21.9%)	7 / 32
Independent	3,544 (17.8%)	▲1.4	1 (11.1%)	1 / 9	▼5	7 (21.9%)	7 / 32
Residents	3,617 (18.2%)	▼7.5	1 (11.1%)	1 / 9	Steady	4 (12.5%)	4 / 32
Chamber of Trade	0 (0.0%)	Steady	0 (0.0%)	0 / 9	Steady	1 (3.1%)	1 / 32
Communist Party	598 (3.0%)	N/A	0 (0.0%)	0 / 9	N/A	0 (0.0%)	0 / 32

=== Full council ===
↓
7	4	7	1	13

=== Aldermen ===
↓
3	5

=== Councillors ===
↓
4	4	7	1	8

== Ward results ==
=== Brooklands ===
Brooklands
Party	Candidate	Votes	%	±%
Conservative	J. G. Steel	1,114	45.2	
Residents	W. Hanley	923	37.4	
Labour	T. Heywood	428	17.4	
Majority		191	7.7	
Turnout		2,465		
Conservative gain from Residents		Swing		

=== Mersey ===
Mersey (2 vacancies)
Party	Candidate	Votes	%	±%
Conservative	W. A. Jones	1,215	48.0	
Labour	C. Mapp	897	35.4	
Conservative	H. H. Cunliffe	870	34.4	
Labour	J. T. Hills	779	30.8	
Residents	R. C. Lynden	616	24.3	
Residents	T. Marriott-Moore	412	16.3	
Majority		22	0.9	
Turnout		2,531		
Conservative gain from Independent		Swing		
Labour gain from Independent		Swing		

=== St. Anne's ===
St. Anne's
Party	Candidate	Votes	%	±%
Independent	T. F. Hampson*	1,338	61.7	+2.9
Labour	R. G. Thomas	831	38.3	−2.9
Majority		507	23.4	+5.8
Turnout		2,169		
Independent hold		Swing		

=== St. John's ===
St. John's
Party	Candidate	Votes	%	±%
Conservative	F. B. Taylor*	1,543	72.1	
Communist	J. Dodd	598	27.9	
Majority		945	44.1	
Turnout		2,141		
Conservative hold		Swing		

=== St. Martin's ===
St. Martin's
Party	Candidate	Votes	%	±%
Conservative	W. A. Costello*	889	42.8	+7.2
Residents	J. Kershaw	628	30.2	−34.2
Labour	E. H. Dorber	560	26.7	N/A
Majority		261	12.6	
Turnout		2,077		
Conservative hold		Swing		

=== St. Mary's ===
St. Mary's
Party	Candidate	Votes	%	±%
Residents	E. Lee	1,038	47.2	−3.5
Conservative	G. H. Jolley	597	27.2	−22.1
Independent	L. Stockdale	562	25.6	N/A
Majority		441	20.0	+18.6
Turnout		2,197		
Residents gain from Independent		Swing		

=== St. Paul's ===
St. Paul's
Party	Candidate	Votes	%	±%
Labour	T. Driver	1,363	65.4	+8.0
Independent	J. F. Barnes*	720	34.6	−8.0
Majority		643	30.8	+16.0
Turnout		2,083		
Labour gain from Independent		Swing		

=== Sale Moor ===
Sale Moor
Party	Candidate	Votes	%	±%
Labour	W. M. Phillips	1,069	56.2	+13.4
Independent	B. Flinter*	834	43.8	N/A
Majority		235	12.4	
Turnout		1,903		
Labour gain from Independent		Swing		
