= 1956 Sale Municipal Borough Council election =

Local election in Cheshire, England

← 1955	10 May 1956	1957 →

8 of 32 seats to Sale Municipal Borough Council 16 seats needed for a majority
	First party	Second party	Third party
Party	Conservative	Labour	Liberal
Last election	7 seats, 53.0%	1 seats, 47.0%	did not stand
Seats before	26	5	1
Seats won	5	2	1
Seats after	25	5	2
Seat change	▼1	Steady	▲1
Popular vote	5,267	3,899	1,599
Percentage	47.4%	35.1%	14.4%
Swing	▼5.6%	▼11.9%	▲14.4%
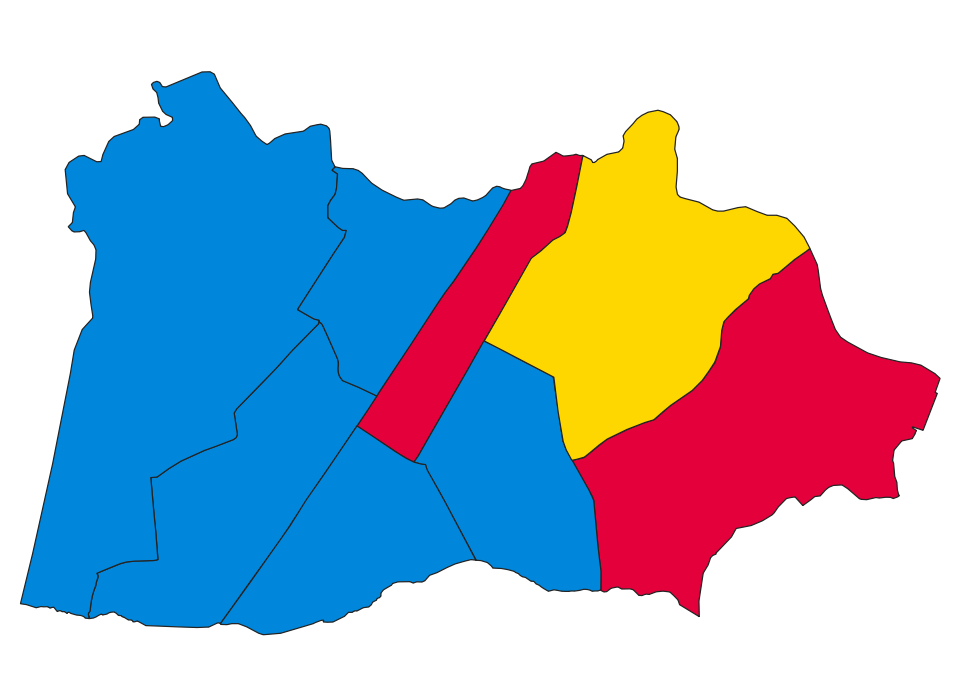
- Map of results of 1956 election
Leader of the Council before election
Conservative
Leader of the Council after election
Conservative

Elections to Sale Council were held on Thursday, 10 May 1956. One third of the councillors were up for election, with each successful candidate to serve a three-year term of office. The Conservative Party retained overall control of the council.

== Election result ==
Party	Votes		Seats			Full Council	
Conservative Party	5,267 (47.4%)	▼5.6	5 (62.5%)	5 / 8	▼1	25 (78.1%)	25 / 32
Labour Party	3,899 (35.1%)	▼11.9	2 (25.0%)	2 / 8	Steady	5 (15.6%)	5 / 32
Liberal Party	1,599 (14.4%)	▲14.4	1 (12.5%)	1 / 8	▲1	2 (6.3%)	2 / 32
Independent	345 (3.1%)	N/A	0 (0.0%)	0 / 8	Steady	0 (0.0%)	0 / 32

=== Full council ===
↓
5	2	25

=== Aldermen ===
↓
8

=== Councillors ===
↓
5	2	17

== Ward results ==
=== Brooklands ===
Brooklands
Party	Candidate	Votes	%	±%
Conservative	P. A. A. Pepper	uncontested		
Conservative hold		Swing		

=== Mersey ===
Mersey
Party	Candidate	Votes	%	±%
Conservative	R. G. Graham*	993	59.7	
Labour	A. Wilkinson	502	30.2	
Independent	C. A. Ralph	168	10.1	
Majority		491	29.5	
Turnout		1,663		
Conservative hold		Swing		

=== St. Anne's ===
St. Anne's
Party	Candidate	Votes	%	±%
Liberal	J. S. Rowlinson	1,183	58.5	
Conservative	E. W. Wilkins*	841	41.5	
Majority		342	17.0	
Turnout		2,024		
Liberal gain from Conservative		Swing		

=== St. John's ===
St. John's
Party	Candidate	Votes	%	±%
Conservative	S. P. Harris	uncontested		
Conservative hold		Swing		

=== St. Martin's ===
St. Martin's
Party	Candidate	Votes	%	±%
Conservative	W. C. Peploe	1,263	56.2	−1.8
Labour	W. Munro	984	43.8	+1.8
Majority		279	12.4	−3.6
Turnout		2,247		
Conservative hold		Swing		

=== St. Mary's ===
St. Mary's
Party	Candidate	Votes	%	±%
Conservative	M. Dickinson*	684	62.2	
Liberal	J. A. Tovey	416	37.8	
Majority		268	24.4	
Turnout		1,100		
Conservative hold		Swing		

=== St. Paul's ===
St. Paul's
Party	Candidate	Votes	%	±%
Labour	T. A. Winnington	851	55.4	+8.8
Conservative	R. W. Paskin	509	33.1	−20.3
Independent	A. E. Johnson	177	11.5	N/A
Majority		342	22.3	
Turnout		1,537		
Labour hold		Swing		

=== Sale Moor ===
Sale Moor
Party	Candidate	Votes	%	±%
Labour	W. M. Phillips*	1,562	61.1	+9.1
Conservative	A. P. Jamieson	977	38.9	−9.1
Majority		585	22.2	+18.2
Turnout		2,539		
Labour hold		Swing		
