= 1936 Sale Municipal Borough Council election =

English local election

- 2 November 1936

8 of 32 seats to Sale Municipal Borough Council 16 seats needed for a majority
	First party	Second party	Third party
Party	Independent	Labour	Chamber of Trade
Last election	15 seats, 55.8%	3 seats, 21.3%	1 seats, 2.5%
Seats before	26	4	2
Seats won	6	1	0
Seats after	25	4	2
Seat change	▼1	Steady	Steady
Popular vote	3,699	1,980	0
Percentage	56.8%	30.4%	0.0%
Swing	▲1.0%	▲9.1%	▼2.5%
	Fourth party
Party	Residents
Last election	did not stand
Seats before	0
Seats won	1
Seats after	1
Seat change	▲1
Popular vote	830
Percentage	12.8%
Swing	N/A
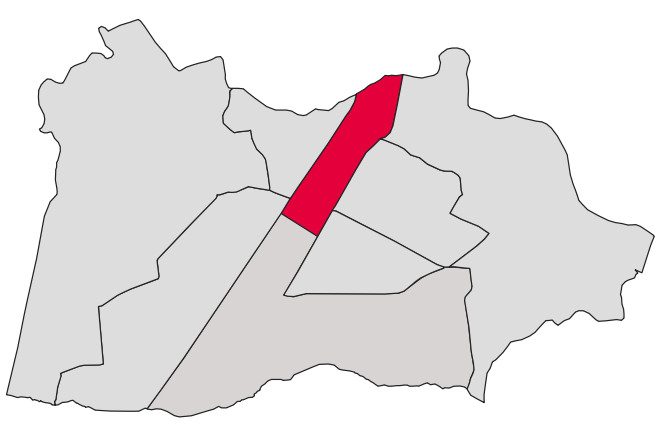
- Map of results of 1936 election
Leader of the Council before election
Independent
Leader of the Council after election
Independent

Elections to Sale Council were held on Monday, 2 November 1936. One third of the councillors were up for election, with each successful candidate to serve a three-year term of office. Independents retained overall control of the council.

== Election result ==
Party	Votes		Seats			Full Council	
Independent	3,699 (56.8%)	▲1.0	15 (75.0%)	6 / 8	▼1	25 (78.1%)	25 / 32
Labour Party	1,980 (30.4%)	▲9.1	1 (12.5%)	1 / 8	▲1	4 (12.5%)	4 / 32
Chamber of Trade	0 (0.0%)	▼2.5	0 (0.0%)	0 / 8	Steady	2 (6.2%)	2 / 32
Residents	830 (12.8%)	N/A	1 (12.5%)	1 / 8	▲1	1 (3.1%)	1 / 32

=== Full council ===
↓
4	1	25	2

=== Aldermen ===
↓
1	7

=== Councillors ===
↓
3	1	18	2

== Ward results ==
=== Central ===
Central
Party	Candidate	Votes	%	±%
Independent	F. B. Taylor	541	62.3	
Independent	C. A. Ryder*	328	37.7	
Majority		213	24.5	
Turnout		869		
Independent gain from Independent		Swing		

=== East ===
East
Party	Candidate	Votes	%	±%
Independent	B. Flinter*	uncontested		
Independent hold		Swing		

=== Mersey ===
Mersey
Party	Candidate	Votes	%	±%
Independent	A. W. Turner*	480	50.8	
Labour	C. Mapp*	464	49.2	
Majority		16	1.6	
Turnout		944		
Independent hold		Swing		

=== North ===
North
Party	Candidate	Votes	%	±%
Independent	J. H. Wilson*	651	58.6	
Labour	H. C. Wade	459	41.4	
Majority		192	17.3	
Turnout		1,110		
Independent hold		Swing		

=== St. Martin's ===
St. Martin's
Party	Candidate	Votes	%	±%
Independent	W. A. Costello	829	65.2	
Labour	E. H. Thomas	442	34.8	
Majority		387	30.4	
Turnout		1,271		
Independent hold		Swing		

=== St. Mary's ===
St. Mary's
Party	Candidate	Votes	%	±%
Independent	H. B. Provis*	uncontested		
Independent hold		Swing		

=== South ===
South
Party	Candidate	Votes	%	±%
Residents	L. W. Coxon	830	64.5	
Independent	E. N. Bowden*	457	35.5	
Majority		373	29.0	
Turnout		1,287		
Residents gain from Independent		Swing		

=== West ===
West
Party	Candidate	Votes	%	±%
Labour	H. Townend*	615	59.8	
Independent	W. Birch	413	40.2	
Majority		202	19.6	
Turnout		1,028		
Labour hold		Swing		
