= 1958 Sale Municipal Borough Council election =

Local election in Cheshire, England

← 1957	8 May 1958	1959 →

8 of 32 seats to Sale Municipal Borough Council 16 seats needed for a majority
	First party	Second party	Third party
Party	Conservative	Labour	Liberal
Last election	4 seats, 47.8%	2 seats, 30.2%	2 seats, 22.0%
Seats before	24	5	3
Seats won	4	3	1
Seats after	21	7	4
Seat change	▼3	▲2	▲1
Popular vote	8,174	5,380	2,738
Percentage	50.2%	33.0%	16.8%
Swing	▲2.4%	▲2.8%	▼5.2%
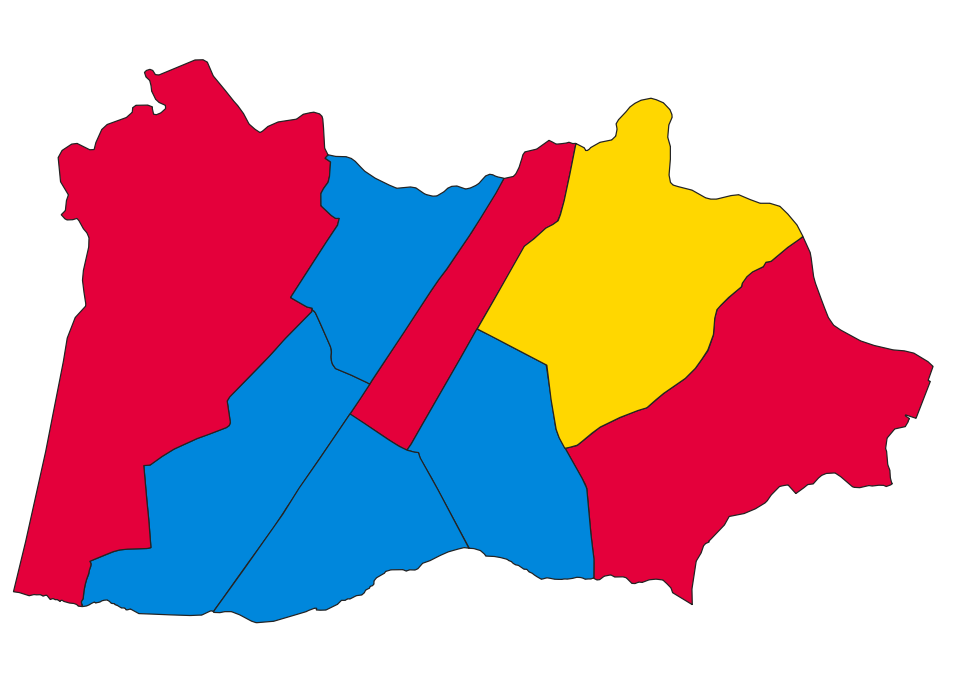
- Map of results of 1958 election
Leader of the Council before election
Conservative
Leader of the Council after election
Conservative

Elections to Sale Council were held on Thursday, 8 May 1958. One third of the councillors were up for election, with each successful candidate to serve a three-year term of office. The Conservative Party retained overall control of the council.

== Election result ==
Party	Votes		Seats			Full Council	
Conservative Party	8,174 (50.2%)	▲2.4	4 (50.0%)	4 / 8	▼3	21 (62.6%)	21 / 32
Labour Party	5,380 (33.0%)	▲2.8	3 (37.5%)	3 / 8	▲2	7 (21.9%)	7 / 32
Liberal Party	2,738 (16.8%)	▼5.2	1 (12.5%)	1 / 8	▲1	4 (12.5%)	4 / 32

=== Full council ===
↓
7	4	21

=== Aldermen ===
↓
8

=== Councillors ===
↓
7	4	13

== Ward results ==
=== Brooklands ===
Brooklands
Party	Candidate	Votes	%	±%
Conservative	A. G. Goodliffe*	1,317	83.2	N/A
Labour	A. H. Wolstenholme	266	16.8	N/A
Majority		1,051	66.4	
Turnout		1,583		
Conservative hold		Swing		

=== Mersey ===
Mersey
Party	Candidate	Votes	%	±%
Conservative	H. H. Cunliffe*	826	70.1	+34.4
Labour	A. Wilkinson	353	29.9	N/A
Majority		473	40.2	
Turnout		1,179		
Conservative hold		Swing		

=== St. Anne's ===
St. Anne's
Party	Candidate	Votes	%	±%
Liberal	F. W. Parker	1,204	51.4	+0.7
Conservative	C. C. James*	783	33.4	−15.9
Labour	A. Quinn	356	15.2	N/A
Majority		421	18.0	+16.7
Turnout		2,343		
Liberal gain from Conservative		Swing		

=== St. John's ===
St. John's
Party	Candidate	Votes	%	±%
Conservative	R. G. Taylor*	1,049	45.5	N/A
Liberal	R. E. Puddephatt	1,000	43.4	N/A
Labour	N. G. Atkinson	255	11.1	N/A
Majority		49	2.1	
Turnout		2,304		
Conservative hold		Swing		

=== St. Martin's ===
St. Martin's
Party	Candidate	Votes	%	±%
Labour	W. Munro	1,249	50.1	+8.4
Conservative	R. M. Willan*	1,243	49.9	−8.4
Majority		6	0.2	
Turnout		2,492		
Labour gain from Conservative		Swing		

=== St. Mary's ===
St. Mary's
Party	Candidate	Votes	%	±%
Conservative	M. Cave*	1,181	65.1	+9.8
Liberal	L. Jones	534	29.5	−15.2
Labour	L. I. Atkinson	98	5.4	N/A
Majority		647	35.6	+25.1
Turnout		1,813		
Conservative hold		Swing		

=== St. Paul's ===
St. Paul's
Party	Candidate	Votes	%	±%
Labour	S. Orme	1,175	59.1	−2.8
Conservative	F. Leigh*	813	40.9	+2.8
Majority		362	18.2	−9.4
Turnout		1,988		
Labour gain from Conservative		Swing		

=== Sale Moor ===
Sale Moor
Party	Candidate	Votes	%	±%
Labour	W. L. Baddeley	1,628	62.9	+7.1
Conservative	F. S. Laughton	962	37.1	−7.1
Majority		666	25.7	−14.1
Turnout		2,590		
Labour hold		Swing		
