= 1949 Sale Municipal Borough Council election =

Local election in England

- 12 May 1949

9 of 32 seats to Sale Municipal Borough Council 16 seats needed for a majority
	First party	Second party
Party	Conservative	Labour
Last election	8 seats, 66.6%	0 seats, 23.4%
Seats before	27	3
Seats won	9	0
Seats after	30	2
Seat change	▲3	▼1
Popular vote	10,663	3,901
Percentage	66.4%	24.3%
Swing	▼0.2%	▲0.9%
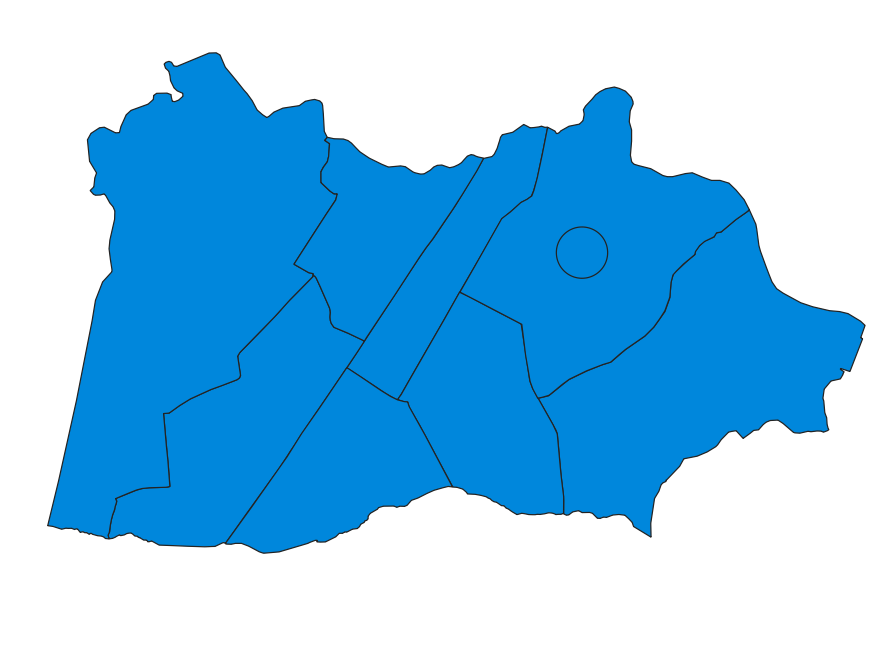
- Map of results of 1949 election
Leader of the Council before election
Conservative
Leader of the Council after election
Conservative

Elections to Sale Council were held on Thursday, 12 May 1949. One third of the councillors were up for election, with each successful candidate to serve a three-year term of office. The Conservative Party retained overall control of the council.

== Election result ==
Party	Votes		Seats			Full Council	
Conservative Party	10,663 (66.4%)	▼0.2	9 (100.0%)	9 / 9	▲3	30 (93.7%)	30 / 32
Labour Party	3,901 (24.3%)	▲0.9	0 (0.0%)	0 / 9	▼1	2 (6.3%)	2 / 32
Residents	898 (5.6%)	▼2.7	0 (0.0%)	0 / 9	▼1	0 (0.0%)	0 / 32
Independent Conservative	589 (3.7%)	▲3.7	0 (0.0%)	0 / 9	▼1	0 (0.0%)	0 / 32

=== Full council ===
↓
2	30

=== Aldermen ===
↓
1	7

=== Councillors ===
↓
1	23

== Ward results ==
=== Brooklands ===
Brooklands
Party	Candidate	Votes	%	±%
Conservative	A. G. Goodliffe	1,539	63.2	
Residents	W. Hanley*	898	36.8	
Majority		641	26.3	
Turnout		2,437		
Conservative gain from Residents		Swing		

=== Mersey ===
Mersey
Party	Candidate	Votes	%	±%
Conservative	H. H. Cunliffe*	1,470	66.6	−6.0
Labour	S. Orme	737	33.4	+6.0
Majority		733	33.2	−12.0
Turnout		2,207		
Conservative hold		Swing		

=== St. Anne's ===
St. Anne's (2 vacancies)
Party	Candidate	Votes	%	±%
Conservative	T. F. Hampson*	1,813	42.7	
Conservative	E. W. Wilkins	1,667	39.3	
Labour	C. B. Bloor	759	17.9	
Majority		908	21.4	
Turnout		4,239		
Conservative hold		Swing		
Conservative hold		Swing		

=== St. John's ===
St. John's
Party	Candidate	Votes	%	±%
Conservative	F. B. Taylor*	uncontested		
Conservative hold		Swing		

=== St. Martin's ===
St. Martin's
Party	Candidate	Votes	%	±%
Conservative	W. A. Costello*	uncontested		
Conservative hold		Swing		

=== St. Mary's ===
St. Mary's
Party	Candidate	Votes	%	±%
Conservative	M. Cave	1,419	70.6	−1.8
Ind. Conservative	E. Lee*	589	29.3	N/A
Majority		830	41.2	−3.6
Turnout		2,008		
Conservative gain from Ind. Conservative		Swing		

=== St. Paul's ===
St. Paul's
Party	Candidate	Votes	%	±%
Conservative	P. M. Wellbeloved*	1,315	54.3	−1.5
Labour	C. Mapp	1,105	45.7	+1.5
Majority		210	8.7	−3.0
Turnout		2,420		
Conservative hold		Swing		

=== Sale Moor ===
Sale Moor
Party	Candidate	Votes	%	±%
Conservative	T. Brindley	1,440	52.6	−4.6
Labour	W. M. Phillips*	1,300	47.4	+14.3
Majority		140	5.1	−19.0
Turnout		2,740		
Conservative gain from Labour		Swing		
