= 1937 Sale Municipal Borough Council election =

English local election

- 1 November 1937

8 of 32 seats to Sale Municipal Borough Council 16 seats needed for a majority
	First party	Second party	Third party
Party	Conservative	Independent	Labour
Last election	did not stand	6 seats, 56.8%	1 seats, 30.4%
Seats before	15	10	4
Seats won	3	4	0
Seats after	16	10	4
Seat change	▲1	Steady	Steady
Popular vote	2,117	2,836	928
Percentage	30.0%	40.2%	13.2%
Swing	▲30.0%	▼16.6%	▼17.2%
	Fourth party	Fifth party
Party	Residents	Chamber of Trade
Last election	1 seats, 12.8%	0 seats, 0.0%
Seats before	1	2
Seats won	0	1
Seats after	1	1
Seat change	Steady	▼1
Popular vote	747	424
Percentage	10.6%	6.0%
Swing	▼2.2%	▲6.0%
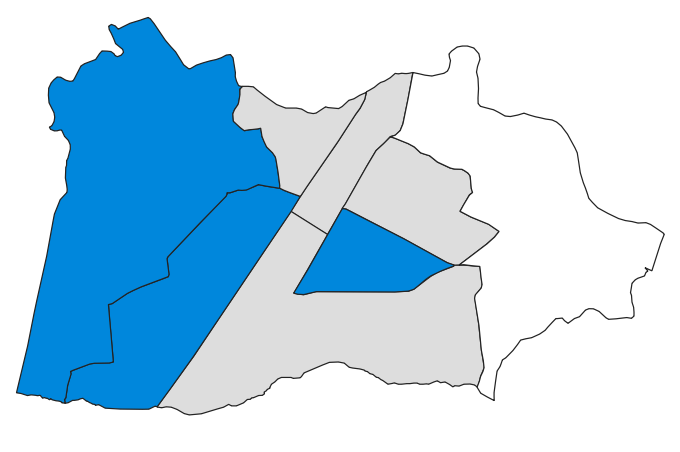
- Map of results of 1937 election
Leader of the Council before election
No overall control
Leader of the Council after election
Conservative

Elections to Sale Council were held on Monday, 1 November 1937. One third of the councillors were up for election, with each successful candidate to serve a three-year term of office. The Conservative Party gained 1 for a majority of seats, and overall control of the council.

== Election result ==
Party	Votes		Seats			Full Council	
Conservative Party	2,117 (30.0%)	N/A	3 (37.5%)	3 / 8	▲1	16 (50.0%)	16 / 32
Independent	2,836 (40.2%)	▼16.6	4 (50.0%)	4 / 8	Steady	10 (31.3%)	10 / 32
Labour Party	928 (13.2%)	▼17.2	0 (0.0%)	0 / 8	Steady	4 (12.5%)	4 / 32
Residents	747 (10.6%)	▼2.2	0 (0.0%)	0 / 8	Steady	1 (3.1%)	1 / 32
Chamber of Trade	424 (6.0%)	▲6.0	1 (12.5%)	1 / 8	▼1	1 (3.1%)	1 / 32

=== Full council ===
↓
4	1	10	1	16

=== Aldermen ===
↓
2	6

=== Councillors ===
↓
2	1	10	1	10

== Ward results ==
=== Central ===
Central
Party	Candidate	Votes	%	±%
Conservative	P. Rowles	490	53.6	N/A
Chamber of Trade	M. F. Ratcliffe*	424	46.4	N/A
Majority		66	7.2	
Turnout		914		
Conservative gain from Chamber of Trade		Swing		

=== East ===
East
Party	Candidate	Votes	%	±%
Chamber of Trade	J. E. Hilton*	uncontested		
Chamber of Trade hold		Swing		

=== Mersey ===
Mersey
Party	Candidate	Votes	%	±%
Independent	R. P. Bannister*	466	42.4	−8.4
Labour	H. C. Wade	373	33.9	−15.3
Independent	H. R. Shaw	260	23.7	N/A
Majority		93	8.5	+6.9
Turnout		1,099		
Independent hold		Swing		

=== North ===
North
Party	Candidate	Votes	%	±%
Independent	F. D. Gee*	645	61.0	+2.4
Independent	H. Crawford	413	39.0	N/A
Majority		232	22.0	+4.7
Turnout		1,058		
Independent hold		Swing		

=== St. Martin's ===
St. Martin's
Party	Candidate	Votes	%	±%
Conservative	T. Parker*	798	51.7	N/A
Residents	L. House	747	48.3	N/A
Majority		51	3.4	
Turnout		1,545		
Conservative hold		Swing		

=== St. Mary's ===
St. Mary's
Party	Candidate	Votes	%	±%
Conservative	J. R. Hulme*	829	67.7	N/A
Independent	W. H. Brownhill	395	32.3	
Majority		424	35.4	
Turnout		1,224		
Conservative hold		Swing		

=== South ===
South
Party	Candidate	Votes	%	±%
Independent	P. N. Clough*	uncontested		
Independent hold		Swing		

=== West ===
West
Party	Candidate	Votes	%	±%
Independent	D. Jackson*	657	54.2	+14.0
Labour	W. Birch	555	45.8	−14.0
Majority		102	8.4	
Turnout		1,212		
Independent hold		Swing		
