= 1987 Llanelli Borough Council election =

Welsh local election

An election to Llanelli Borough Council was held in May 1987. It was preceded by the 1983 election and followed by the 1991 election. On the same day there were elections to the other district local authorities and community councils in Wales.

== Overview ==
The Labour Party continued to hold the majority of seats following the election but following the boundary changes a number of seats were lost to other political parties and to Independents.

== Boundary Changes ==
There were wholesale boundary changes and new wards created in place of the previous eleven three-member wards which were abolished.

== Results ==
=== Bigyn (three seats) ===
Bigyn 1987
Party	Candidate	Votes	%	±%
Labour	W.M. Jones*	1,245		
Chamber of Trade	W.J. Marks	1,169		
Labour	D.H.R. Jones*	1,166		
Labour	Keri Peter Thomas*	1,051		
Chamber of Trade	R.C. Rosser	670		
Conservative	G.H.H. Williams	563		
Labour win (new seat)				
Chamber of Trade win (new seat)				
Labour win (new seat)				

=== Burry Port (three seats) ===
Burry Port 1987
Party	Candidate	Votes	%	±%
Labour	Vincent John Rees*	970		
Independent	George W. West	783		
Labour	A.H.P. Phillips*	639		
Labour	D.H. Morris	592		
Plaid Cymru	J.F. Kelly	520		
Independent	Raymond L. Hall	483		
Labour win (new seat)				
Independent win (new seat)				
Labour win (new seat)				

=== Bynea (one seat) ===
Bynea 1987
Party	Candidate	Votes	%	±%
Labour	W.R. Thomas*	676		
Independent Labour	A.F. Brown*	366		
Majority				
Labour win (new seat)				

=== Cross Hands (one seat) ===
Cross Hands 1987
Party	Candidate	Votes	%	±%
Labour	Philip Brinley Davies	unopposed		
Labour win (new seat)				

=== Dafen (two seats) ===
Dafen 1987
Party	Candidate	Votes	%	±%
Labour	L.R. McDonagh*	616		
Labour	W.D. Murphy	467		
Residents	Brian Stringer	449		
Labour win (new seat)				
Labour win (new seat)				

=== Elli (two seats) ===
Elli 1987
Party	Candidate	Votes	%	±%
Alliance (Liberal)	Michael Willis Gimblett*	766		
Chamber of Trade	W.H. Griffiths*	706		
Labour	R.T. Peregrine*	534		
Labour	S.L. Evans	409		
Conservative	M.K. Jenkins	357		
Alliance win (new seat)				
Chamber of Trade win (new seat)				

=== Felinfoel (one seat) ===
Felinfoel 1987
Party	Candidate	Votes	%	±%
Labour	Henry John Evans*	381		
Chamber of Trade	P. Donoghue	161		
Residents	H. Rees	91		
Majority				
Labour win (new seat)				

=== Glanymor (two seats) ===
Glanymor 1987
Party	Candidate	Votes	%	±%
Labour	David Tudor James*	1,339		
Labour	R. Palmer*	1,106		
Independent Labour	G. Rees*	979		
Labour win (new seat)				
Labour win (new seat)				

=== Glyn (one seat) ===
Glyn 1987
Party	Candidate	Votes	%	±%
Independent Labour	Dynfor Vaughan Owens	543		
Labour	G.H. Jones*	342		
Chamber of Trade	J.A.W. Protheroe	119		
Majority				
Independent Labour win (new seat)				

=== Hendy (one seat) ===
Hendy 1987
Party	Candidate	Votes	%	±%
Labour	R.H.V. Lewis*	unopposed		
Labour win (new seat)				

=== Hengoed (two seats) ===
Hengoed 1987
Party	Candidate	Votes	%	±%
Labour	W.R. Jones*	875		
Alliance (SDP)	J.A.G. Antoniazzi	747		
Labour	D.K. Williams	711		
Chamber of Trade	H.J. Woolley	421		
Independent	R. Griffiths	332		
Labour win (new seat)				
Alliance win (new seat)				

=== Kidwelly (one seat) ===
Kidwelly 1987
Party	Candidate	Votes	%	±%
Labour	Gwilym Glanmor Jones*	unopposed		
Labour win (new seat)				

=== Llangennech (two seats) ===
Llangennech 1987
Party	Candidate	Votes	%	±%
Labour	Sefton Ronald Coslett*	677		
Independent	Cerith David Thomas	548		
Labour	K.A. Evans	483		
Plaid Cymru	G. Coslett	443		
Plaid Cymru	T.E. Sennell	397		
Labour win (new seat)				
Independent win (new seat)				

=== Lliedi (two seats) ===
Lliedi 1987
Party	Candidate	Votes	%	±%
Alliance (Liberal)	Elinor Gem Lloyd*	1,036		
Chamber of Trade	F.St.J. Roberts	876		
Labour	T.J. Price	798		
Labour	William George Thomas	758		
Alliance (SDP)	Margaret N. Burree	505		
Alliance win (new seat)				
Chamber of Trade win (new seat)				

=== Llwynhendy (two seats) ===
Llwynhendy 1987
Party	Candidate	Votes	%	±%
Labour	Thomas Dillwyn Bowen*	901		
Labour	L. Williams	764		
Independent Labour	J.E. Evans	337		
Labour win (new seat)				
Labour win (new seat)				

=== Pembrey (one seat) ===
Pembrey 1987
Party	Candidate	Votes	%	±%
Labour	Trevor Uriel Jones Thomas	765		
Plaid Cymru	D.A. Williams	403		
Majority				
Labour win (new seat)				

=== Pontyberem (one seat) ===
Pontyberem 1987
Party	Candidate	Votes	%	±%
Labour	Alban William Rees*	unopposed		
Labour win (new seat)				

=== Swiss Valley (one seat) ===
Swiss Valley 1987
Party	Candidate	Votes	%	±%
Chamber of Trade	R.H. Oram	481		
Labour	V.B. Hitchman*	460		
Majority		21		
Chamber of Trade win (new seat)				

=== Trimsaran (one seat) ===
Trimsaran 1987
Party	Candidate	Votes	%	±%
Labour	H.W. Jenkins*	671		
Plaid Cymru	Illtyd Beynon	463		
Majority		208		
Labour win (new seat)				

=== Tumble (two seats) ===
Tumble 1987
Party	Candidate	Votes	%	±%
Labour	J.W.V. Harris*	unopposed		
Labour	E.T. Morgan*	unopposed		
Labour win (new seat)				
Labour win (new seat)				

=== Tycroes (one seat) ===
Tycroes 1987
Party	Candidate	Votes	%	±%
Labour	G.J. Jones*	unopposed		
Labour win (new seat)				

=== Tyisha (two seats) ===
Tyisha 1987
Party	Candidate	Votes	%	±%
Labour	David Samuel Neil*	1,026		
Labour	Harry Palmer	957		
Alliance (Liberal)	I.C. Rosser	528		
Alliance (SDP)	E.G. Jones	524		
Labour win (new seat)				
Labour win (new seat)				
