= 1961 Sale Municipal Borough Council election =

Local election in Cheshire, England

← 1960	11 May 1961	1962 →

9 of 32 seats to Sale Municipal Borough Council 16 seats needed for a majority
	First party	Second party	Third party
Party	Conservative	Liberal	Labour
Last election	5 seats, 44.4%	1 seats, 32.3%	2 seats, 23.3%
Seats before	22	3	7
Seats won	2	4	3
Seats after	20	6	6
Seat change	▼2	▲3	▼1
Popular vote	6,846	6,110	4,166
Percentage	40.0%	35.7%	24.3%
Swing	▼4.4%	▲3.4%	▲1.0%
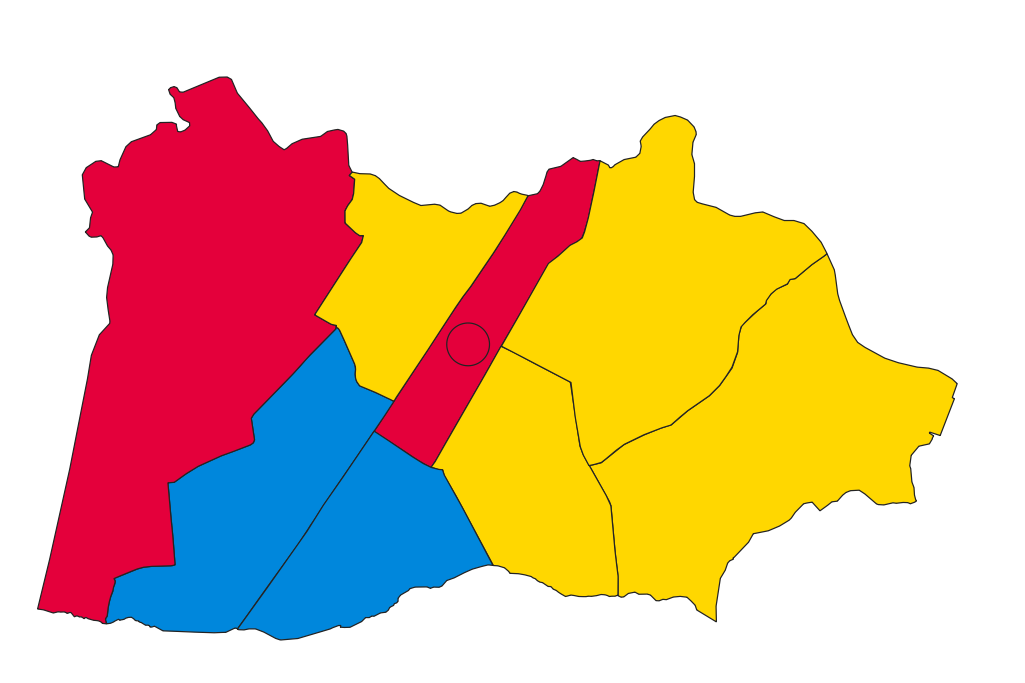
- Map of results of 1961 election
Leader of the Council before election
Conservative
Leader of the Council after election
Conservative

Elections to Sale Council were held on Thursday, 11 May 1961. One third of the councillors were up for election, with each successful candidate to serve a three-year term of office. The Conservative Party retained overall control of the council.

== Election result ==
Party	Votes		Seats			Full Council	
Conservative Party	6,846 (40.0%)	▼4.4	2 (22.2%)	2 / 9	▼2	20 (62.5%)	20 / 32
Liberal Party	6,110 (35.7%)	▲3.4	4 (44.4%)	4 / 9	▲1	6 (18.8%)	6 / 32
Labour Party	4,166 (24.3%)	▲1.0	3 (33.3%)	3 / 9	▼1	6 (18.8%)	6 / 32

=== Full council ===
↓
6	6	20

=== Aldermen ===
↓
8

=== Councillors ===
↓
6	6	12

== Ward results ==
=== Brooklands ===
Brooklands
Party	Candidate	Votes	%	±%
Conservative	A. G. Goodliffe*	943	53.8	−8.9
Liberal	V. Howarth	809	46.2	+8.9
Majority		134	7.7	−17.7
Turnout		1,752		
Conservative hold		Swing		

=== Mersey ===
Mersey
Party	Candidate	Votes	%	±%
Liberal	A. M. Bruckshaw	929	51.3	+0.1
Conservative	F. Leigh*	882	48.7	−0.1
Majority		47	2.6	+0.2
Turnout		1,811		
Liberal gain from Conservative		Swing		

=== St. Anne's ===
St. Anne's
Party	Candidate	Votes	%	±%
Liberal	F. W. Parker*	1,345	63.4	+23.9
Conservative	C. G. Davis	811	37.6	−9.4
Majority		534	25.8	
Turnout		2,156		
Liberal hold		Swing		

=== St. John's ===
St. John's
Party	Candidate	Votes	%	±%
Liberal	E. D. Salem	1,153	51.6	+1.7
Conservative	R. G. Taylor*	1,082	48.4	−1.7
Majority		71	3.2	
Turnout		2,235		
Liberal gain from Conservative		Swing		

=== St. Martin's ===
St. Martin's
Party	Candidate	Votes	%	±%
Labour	W. Munro*	1,483	50.6	+14.7
Conservative	G. H. Grocott	1,449	49.4	−14.7
Majority		39	1.2	
Turnout		2,932		
Labour hold		Swing		

=== St. Mary's ===
St. Mary's
Party	Candidate	Votes	%	±%
Conservative	M. Cave*	1,092	61.7	N/A
Liberal	G. S. Lomas	678	38.3	N/A
Majority		414	23.4	
Turnout		1,770		
Conservative hold		Swing		

=== St. Paul's ===
St. Paul's (2 vacancies)
Party	Candidate	Votes	%	±%
Labour	S. Orme*	801	37.7	
Labour	E. P. Mellor	736	34.7	
Conservative	L. Besford	587	27.6	
Majority		149	7.1	
Turnout		2,124		
Labour hold		Swing		
Labour hold		Swing		

=== Sale Moor ===
Sale Moor
Party	Candidate	Votes	%	±%
Liberal	N. H. Thompson	1,196	51.1	+2.3
Labour	W. L. Baddeley*	1,146	48.9	−2.3
Majority		50	2.2	
Turnout		2,342		
Liberal gain from Labour		Swing		

== By-elections between 1961 and 1962 ==
St. Anne's By-election 27 July 1961
Party	Candidate	Votes	%	±%
Liberal	G. S. Lomas	1,166	62.4	−1.0
Conservative	B. J. Lane	544	29.1	−8.5
Labour	R. Mee	158	8.5	N/A
Majority		622	33.3	+7.5
Turnout		1,868		
Liberal hold		Swing		
