= 1954 Sale Municipal Borough Council election =

Local election in England

- 13 May 1954

8 of 32 seats to Sale Municipal Borough Council 16 seats needed for a majority
	First party	Second party
Party	Conservative	Labour
Last election	6 seats, 55.7%	2 seats, 44.3%
Seats before	28	4
Seats won	7	1
Seats after	27	5
Seat change	▼1	▲1
Popular vote	6,224	3,905
Percentage	57.0%	35.7%
Swing	▲1.3%	▼8.6%
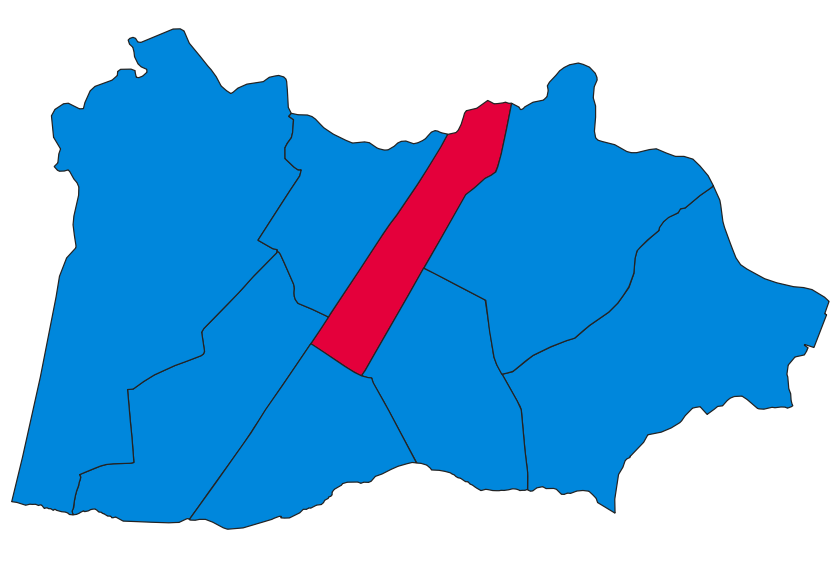
- Map of results of 1954 election
Leader of the Council before election
Conservative
Leader of the Council after election
Conservative

Elections to Sale Council were held on Thursday, 13 May 1954. One third of the councillors were up for election, with each successful candidate to serve a three-year term of office. The Conservative Party retained overall control of the council.

== Election result ==
Party	Votes		Seats			Full Council	
Conservative Party	6,224 (57.0%)	▲1.3	7 (87.5%)	7 / 8	▼1	27 (84.4%)	27 / 32
Labour Party	3,905 (35.7%)	▼8.6	1 (12.5%)	1 / 8	▲1	5 (15.6%)	5 / 32
Liberal Party	795 (7.3%)	N/A	0 (0.0%)	0 / 8	N/A	0 (0.0%)	0 / 32

=== Full council ===
↓
5	27

=== Aldermen ===
↓
8

=== Councillors ===
↓
5	19

== Ward results ==
=== Brooklands ===
Brooklands
Party	Candidate	Votes	%	±%
Conservative	J. G. Steel*	uncontested		
Conservative hold		Swing		

=== Mersey ===
Mersey
Party	Candidate	Votes	%	±%
Conservative	W. A. Jones*	uncontested		
Conservative hold		Swing		

=== St. Anne's ===
St. Anne's
Party	Candidate	Votes	%	±%
Conservative	F. S. Laughton*	1,052	73.3	−16.6
Liberal	B. T. Ames	795	42.8	N/A
Majority		257	13.8	−32.8
Turnout		1,847		
Conservative hold		Swing		

=== St. John's ===
St. John's
Party	Candidate	Votes	%	±%
Conservative	C. J. Hobson*	1,353	69.5	
Labour	E. J. Macauley	595	30.5	
Majority		758	39.0	
Turnout		1,948		
Conservative hold		Swing		

=== St. Martin's ===
St. Martin's
Party	Candidate	Votes	%	±%
Conservative	J. K. Kerr*	1,323	59.8	−8.6
Labour	A. N. Keohane	888	40.2	+8.6
Majority		435	19.6	−17.2
Turnout		2,211		
Conservative hold		Swing		

=== St. Mary's ===
St. Mary's
Party	Candidate	Votes	%	±%
Conservative	E. Lee*	uncontested		
Conservative hold		Swing		

=== St. Paul's ===
St. Paul's
Party	Candidate	Votes	%	±%
Labour	C. G. Woodward	1,065	53.2	+0.2
Conservative	V. S. Webb*	936	46.8	−0.2
Majority		129	6.4	+0.4
Turnout		2,001		
Labour gain from Conservative		Swing		

=== Sale Moor ===
Sale Moor
Party	Candidate	Votes	%	±%
Conservative	L. Bethell*	1,560	53.5	+12.8
Labour	G. A. O'Brien	1,357	46.5	−12.8
Majority		203	7.0	
Turnout		2,917		
Conservative hold		Swing		
