= 1960 Sale Municipal Borough Council election =

Local election in Cheshire, England

← 1959	12 May 1960	1961 →

8 of 32 seats to Sale Municipal Borough Council 16 seats needed for a majority
	First party	Second party	Third party
Party	Conservative	Labour	Liberal
Last election	6 seats, 56.7%	2 seats, 23.1%	0 seats, 20.0%
Seats before	21	7	4
Seats won	5	2	1
Seats after	22	7	3
Seat change	▲1	Steady	▼1
Popular vote	5,908	3,104	4,309
Percentage	44.4%	23.3%	32.3%
Swing	▼12.5%	▲0.2%	▲12.3%
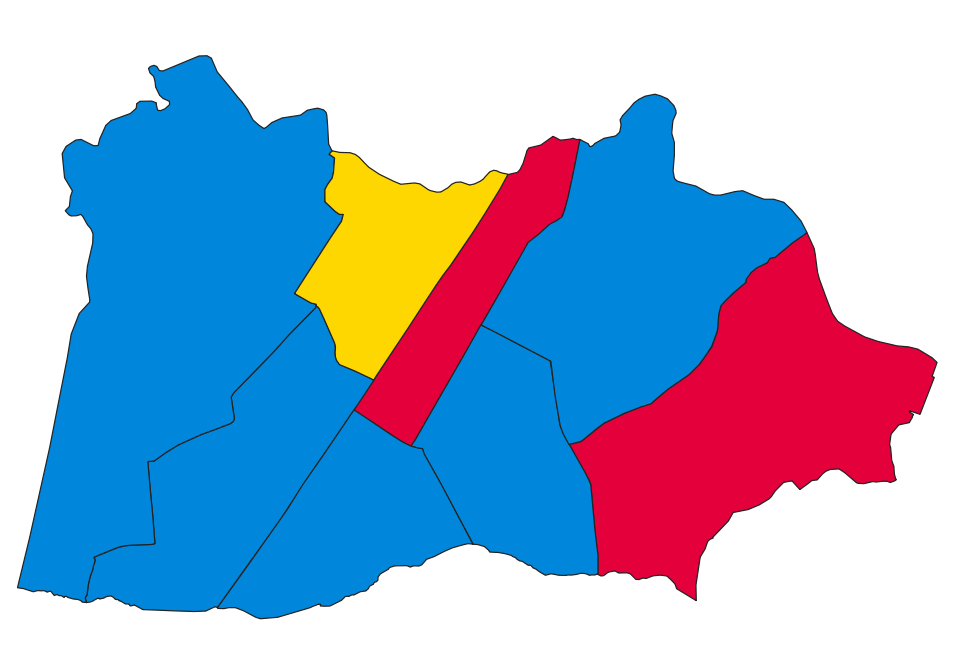
- Map of results of 1960 election
Leader of the Council before election
Conservative
Leader of the Council after election
Conservative

Elections to Sale Council were held on Thursday, 12 May 1960. One third of the councillors were up for election, with each successful candidate to serve a three-year term of office. The Conservative Party retained overall control of the council.

== Election result ==
Party	Votes		Seats			Full Council	
Conservative Party	5,908 (44.4%)	▼12.5	5 (62.5%)	5 / 8	▲1	22 (68.8%)	22 / 32
Labour Party	3,104 (23.3%)	▲0.2	2 (25.0%)	2 / 8	Steady	7 (21.9%)	7 / 32
Liberal Party	4,309 (32.3%)	▲12.3	1 (12.5%)	1 / 8	▼1	3 (9.4%)	3 / 32

=== Full council ===
↓
7	3	22

=== Aldermen ===
↓
8

=== Councillors ===
↓
7	3	14

== Ward results ==
=== Brooklands ===
Brooklands
Party	Candidate	Votes	%	±%
Conservative	E. P. R. Ainsworth*	1,082	62.7	+4.6
Liberal	A. Howarth	643	37.3	−4.6
Majority		439	25.4	+9.1
Turnout		1,725		
Conservative hold		Swing		

=== Mersey ===
Mersey
Party	Candidate	Votes	%	±%
Liberal	C. S. Fink	796	51.2	N/A
Conservative	P. W. H. Revington	759	48.8	−20.4
Majority		37	2.4	
Turnout		1,555		
Liberal hold		Swing		

=== St. Anne's ===
St. Anne's
Party	Candidate	Votes	%	±%
Conservative	A. J. Thorogood	1,028	47.0	+2.8
Liberal	E. M. Parker	863	39.5	−1.1
Labour	K. Walton	287	13.1	−2.1
Majority		165	7.5	+3.9
Turnout		2,178		
Conservative gain from Liberal		Swing		

=== St. John's ===
St. John's
Party	Candidate	Votes	%	±%
Conservative	C. J. Hobson*	972	50.1	−2.1
Liberal	R. E. Puddephatt	968	49.9	+2.1
Majority		4	0.2	−4.2
Turnout		1,940		
Conservative hold		Swing		

=== St. Martin's ===
St. Martin's
Party	Candidate	Votes	%	±%
Conservative	R. S. Heath*	1,736	64.1	+5.7
Labour	E. P. Mellor	971	35.9	−5.7
Majority		765	28.2	+11.4
Turnout		2,707		
Conservative hold		Swing		

=== St. Mary's ===
St. Mary's
Party	Candidate	Votes	%	±%
Conservative	G. Russell	uncontested		
Conservative hold		Swing		

=== St. Paul's ===
St. Paul's
Party	Candidate	Votes	%	±%
Labour	C. G. Woodward*	757	69.6	+9.5
Conservative	L. Besford	331	30.4	−9.5
Majority		426	39.2	+19.0
Turnout		1,088		
Labour hold		Swing		

=== Sale Moor ===
Sale Moor
Party	Candidate	Votes	%	±%
Labour	G. A. O'Brien*	1,089	51.2	N/A
Liberal	N. H. Thompson	1,039	48.8	N/A
Majority		50	2.4	
Turnout		2,128		
Labour hold		Swing		
