= 1952 Sale Municipal Borough Council election =

Local election in England

- 8 May 1952

8 of 32 seats to Sale Municipal Borough Council 16 seats needed for a majority
	First party	Second party
Party	Conservative	Labour
Last election	9 seats, 68.5%	0 seats, 27.2%
Seats before	31	1
Seats won	6	2
Seats after	29	3
Seat change	▼2	▲2
Popular vote	6,181	4,536
Percentage	55.8%	40.9%
Swing	▼12.7%	▲13.7%
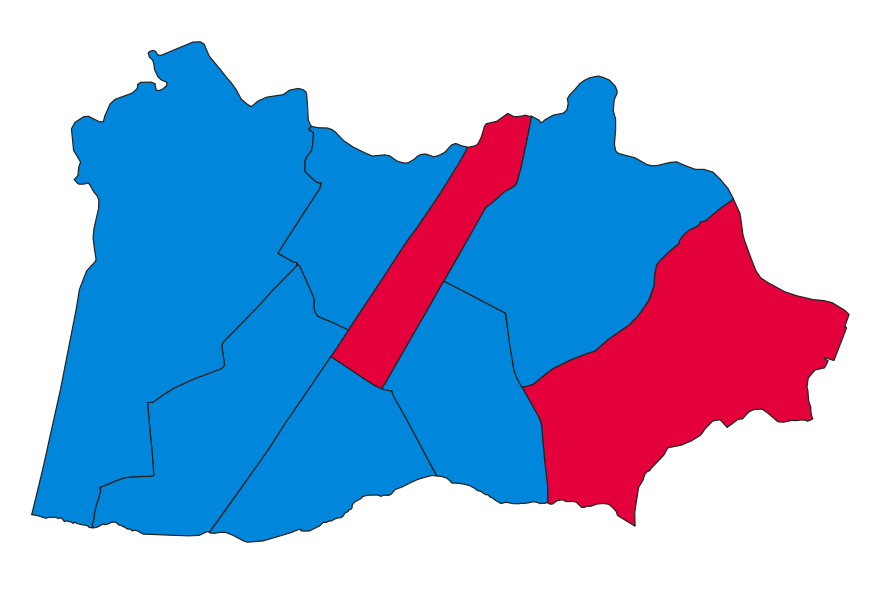
- Map of results of 1952 election
Leader of the Council before election
Conservative
Leader of the Council after election
Conservative

Elections to Sale Council were held on Thursday, 8 May 1952. One third of the councillors were up for election, with each successful candidate to serve a three-year term of office. The Conservative Party retained overall control of the council.

== Election result ==
Party	Votes		Seats			Full Council	
Conservative Party	6,181 (55.8%)	▼12.7	6 (75.0%)	6 / 8	▼2	29 (90.6%)	29 / 32
Labour Party	4,536 (40.9%)	▲13.7	2 (25.0%)	2 / 8	▲2	3 (9.4%)	3 / 32
Liberal Party	365 (3.3%)	▼1.0	0 (0.0%)	0 / 8	Steady	0 (0.0%)	0 / 32

=== Full council ===
↓
3	29

=== Aldermen ===
↓
8

=== Councillors ===
↓
3	21

== Ward results ==
=== Brooklands ===
Brooklands
Party	Candidate	Votes	%	±%
Conservative	A. G. Goodliffe*	uncontested		
Conservative hold		Swing		

=== Mersey ===
Mersey
Party	Candidate	Votes	%	±%
Conservative	H. H. Cunliffe*	1,109	51.0	
Labour	S. J. Cox	701	32.2	
Liberal	B. T. Ames	365	16.8	
Majority		408	18.8	
Turnout		2,175		
Conservative hold		Swing		

=== St. Anne's ===
St. Anne's
Party	Candidate	Votes	%	±%
Conservative	T. F. Hampson*	uncontested		
Conservative hold		Swing		

=== St. John's ===
St. John's
Party	Candidate	Votes	%	±%
Conservative	F. B. Taylor*	1,505	72.3	−1.5
Labour	L. G. Ditcham	577	27.7	+1.5
Majority		928	43.6	−3.0
Turnout		2,082		
Conservative hold		Swing		

=== St. Martin's ===
St. Martin's
Party	Candidate	Votes	%	±%
Conservative	R. M. Willan*	1,236	61.9	
Labour	E. W. Brownjohn	761	38.1	
Majority		475	23.8	
Turnout		1,997		
Conservative hold		Swing		

=== St. Mary's ===
St. Mary's
Party	Candidate	Votes	%	±%
Conservative	M. Cave*	uncontested		
Conservative hold		Swing		

=== St. Paul's ===
St. Paul's
Party	Candidate	Votes	%	±%
Labour	T. A. Winnington	1,209	53.3	+12.0
Conservative	P. M. Wellbeloved*	1,060	46.7	−12.0
Majority		149	6.6	
Turnout		2,269		
Labour gain from Conservative		Swing		

=== Sale Moor ===
Sale Moor
Party	Candidate	Votes	%	±%
Labour	J. Conway	1,288	50.3	+5.6
Conservative	T. Brindley*	1,271	49.7	−5.6
Majority		17	0.6	
Turnout		2,559		
Labour gain from Conservative		Swing		
