= Sale Town Hall =

Municipal building in Sale, Greater Manchester, England

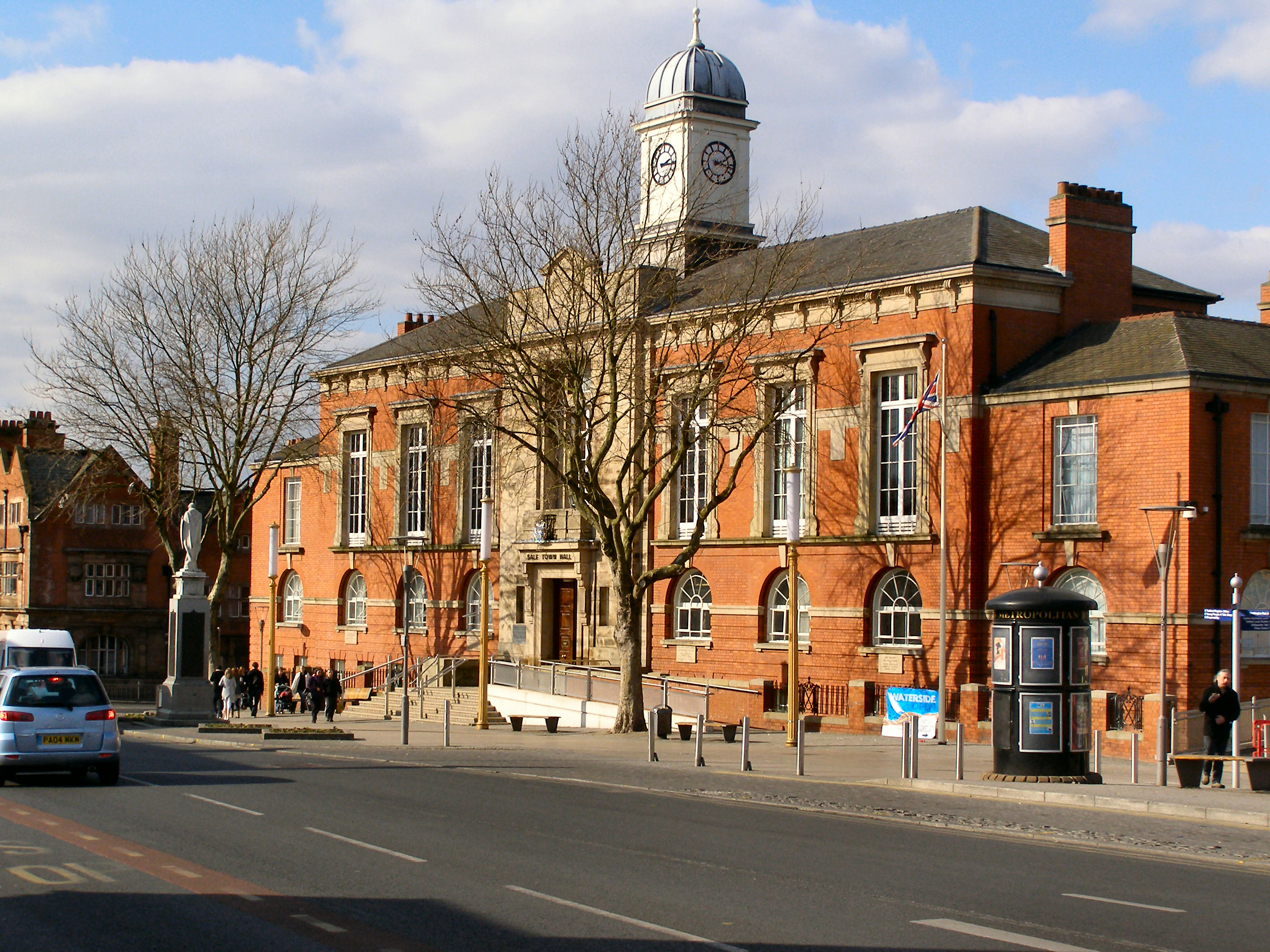
- Sale Town Hall

- Shown in Greater Manchester
- 53.4250°N 2.3197°W
- Location: School Road, Sale

History
- Built: 1915

Site notes
- Architectural style: Neoclassical style

Sale Town Hall is a municipal building on School Road in Sale, Greater Manchester, England. The town hall was the headquarters of Sale Borough Council until the council was abolished in 1974.

== History ==
After rapid development as a commuter town, which saw its population tripling by the end of the 19th century, Sale became an urban district in 1894. Civic leaders decided to procure a town hall and the site they selected on the north side of School Road had already been occupied by local council offices.

The foundation stone for the new building (the eastern wing of the main frontage) was laid by the Chairman of the Public Offices Committee, James McDonald, on 9 May 1914. It was designed in the neoclassical style in red brick and was officially opened by the Chairman of the council, Ernest Jones, on 4 December 1915. A war memorial, which depicted a mourning Saint George on top of a stone pedestal, was designed by Arthur Sherwood Edwards to commemorate local service personnel who had died in the First World War and was unveiled by Major-General Arthur Solly-Flood on 23 May 1925.

After Sale became a municipal borough in September 1935, civic leaders decided to extend the building. The foundation stone for the extension (the western wing of the main frontage) was laid by the Chairman of the Public Offices Committee, Alderman Paley Parrish, on 5 May 1937. It was designed in a similar style and was officially opened by the mayor, Alderman G. F. Gordon, on 2 July 1940. By this time, the design involved a symmetrical main frontage with nine bays facing onto School Road; the central section of seven bays, which slightly projected forward, incorporated a central bay which was faced with stone and featured a doorway on the ground floor with stone brackets supporting an entablature bearing the words "Sale Town Hall" and a coat of arms and balcony above; there was a French door, which was recessed, on the first floor and a pediment above. Sale Library on Tatton Road, which had been based just behind the town hall extension, was rebuilt around the same time. Internally, the principal room in the town hall was the council chamber which was panelled and was decorated in an Art Deco style.

The building was hit by a series of German incendiary bombs on the night of 23 December 1940 during the Manchester Blitz, a part of the Second World War: there were no injuries but the building was badly damaged. A programme of restoration works, which included the installation of a new clock tower with cupola, was completed in 1952. The works included the re-instatement of a stained glass window on the main staircase depicting the coat of arms of the former local member of parliament, Sir William Cunliffe Brooks.

The town hall continued to serve as the headquarters of Sale Borough Council for much of the 20th century, but ceased to be the local seat of government when the enlarged Trafford Council was formed in 1974. A further programme of works to refurbish the town hall, the library and the civic theatre was completed in November 2004. The works involved the conversion of the civic theatre into the new Waterside Arts Centre and the creation of the Robert Bolt Theatre, named after the playwright and a twice Oscar-winning screenwriter, Robert Bolt, behind the east wing of the town hall.
