= 1959 Sale Municipal Borough Council election =

Local election in Cheshire, England

← 1958	7 May 1959	1960 →

8 of 32 seats to Sale Municipal Borough Council 16 seats needed for a majority
	First party	Second party	Third party
Party	Conservative	Labour	Liberal
Last election	4 seats, 50.2%	3 seats, 33.0%	1 seats, 16.8%
Seats before	21	5	4
Seats won	6	2	0
Seats after	22	7	3
Seat change	▲1	Steady	▼1
Popular vote	8,560	3,469	3,013
Percentage	56.7%	23.1%	20.0%
Swing	▲6.7%	▼9.9%	▲3.2%
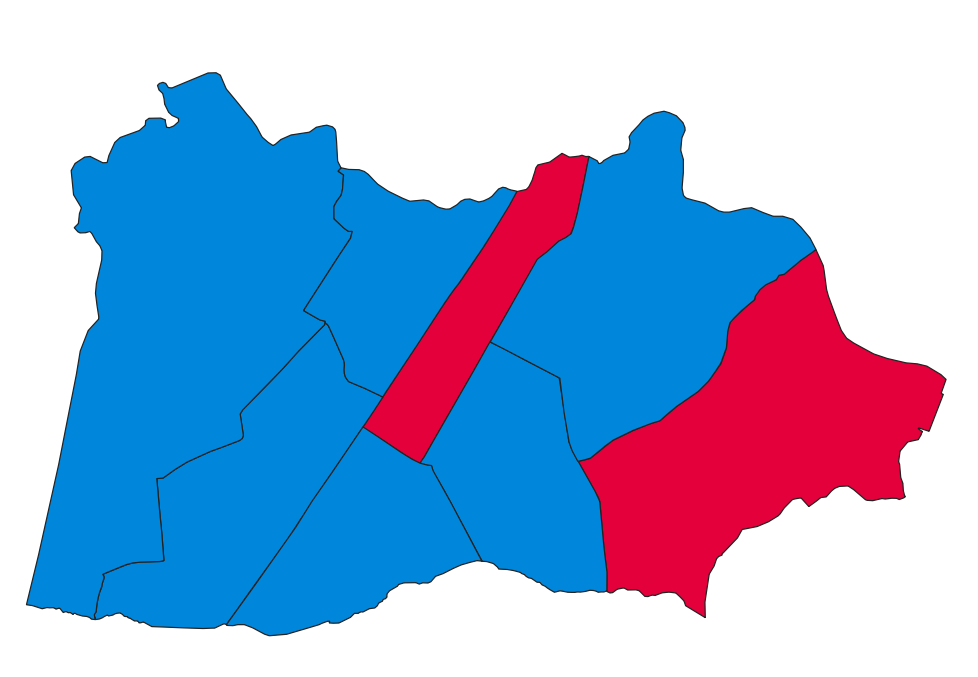
- Map of results of 1959 election
Leader of the Council before election
Conservative
Leader of the Council after election
Conservative

Elections to Sale Council were held on Thursday, 7 May 1959. One third of the councillors were up for election, with each successful candidate to serve a three-year term of office. The Conservative Party retained overall control of the council.

== Election result ==
Party	Votes		Seats			Full Council	
Conservative Party	8,560 (56.9%)	▲6.7	6 (75.0%)	6 / 8	▲1	22 (68.8%)	22 / 32
Labour Party	3,469 (23.1%)	▼9.9	2 (25.0%)	2 / 8	Steady	7 (21.9%)	7 / 32
Liberal Party	3,013 (20.0%)	▲3.2	0 (0.0%)	0 / 8	▼1	3 (9.4%)	3 / 32

=== Full council ===
↓
7	3	22

=== Aldermen ===
↓
8

=== Councillors ===
↓
7	3	14

== Ward results ==
=== Brooklands ===
Brooklands
Party	Candidate	Votes	%	±%
Conservative	P. A. A. Pepper*	1,156	58.1	−25.1
Liberal	A. Howarth	832	41.9	N/A
Majority		324	16.3	−50.1
Turnout		1,988		
Conservative hold		Swing		

=== Mersey ===
Mersey
Party	Candidate	Votes	%	±%
Conservative	R. G. Graham*	1,241	69.2	−0.9
Labour	C. Jackson	553	30.8	+0.9
Majority		688	38.4	−1.4
Turnout		1,794		
Conservative hold		Swing		

=== St. Anne's ===
St. Anne's
Party	Candidate	Votes	%	±%
Conservative	F. S. Laughton	1,188	44.2	+10.8
Liberal	J. S. Rowlinson*	1,091	40.6	−10.8
Labour	A. Quinn	407	15.2	0
Majority		97	3.6	
Turnout		2,686		
Conservative gain from Liberal		Swing		

=== St. John's ===
St. John's
Party	Candidate	Votes	%	±%
Conservative	S. P. Harris*	1,189	52.2	+6.7
Liberal	A. Chapman	1,090	47.8	+4.4
Majority		99	4.4	+2.3
Turnout		2,279		
Conservative hold		Swing		

=== St. Martin's ===
St. Martin's
Party	Candidate	Votes	%	±%
Conservative	H. Jackson	1,812	58.4	+8.5
Labour	E. P. Mellor	1,289	41.6	−8.5
Majority		523	16.8	
Turnout		3,101		
Conservative hold		Swing		

=== St. Mary's ===
St. Mary's
Party	Candidate	Votes	%	±%
Conservative	M. Dickinson*	1,303	86.2	+21.1
Labour	L. I. Atkinson	208	13.8	+8.4
Majority		1,095	72.4	+36.8
Turnout		1,511		
Conservative hold		Swing		

=== St. Paul's ===
St. Paul's
Party	Candidate	Votes	%	±%
Labour	T. A. Winnington*	1,012	60.1	+1.0
Conservative	J. G. McBeath	671	39.9	−1.0
Majority		341	20.2	+2.0
Turnout		1,683		
Labour hold		Swing		

=== Sale Moor ===
Sale Moor
Party	Candidate	Votes	%	±%
Labour	W. M. Phillips*	uncontested		
Labour hold		Swing		
