= 1962 Sale Municipal Borough Council election =

Local election in Cheshire, England

← 1961	10 May 1962	1963 →

9 of 32 seats to Sale Municipal Borough Council 16 seats needed for a majority
	First party	Second party	Third party
Party	Conservative	Liberal	Labour
Last election	2 seats, 40.0%	4 seats, 35.7%	3 seats, 24.3%
Seats before	19	6	7
Seats won	1	7	1
Seats after	14	12	6
Seat change	▼5	▲6	▼1
Popular vote	6,520	9,280	3,510
Percentage	33.9%	47.9%	18.2%
Swing	▼6.1%	▲12.2%	▼6.1%
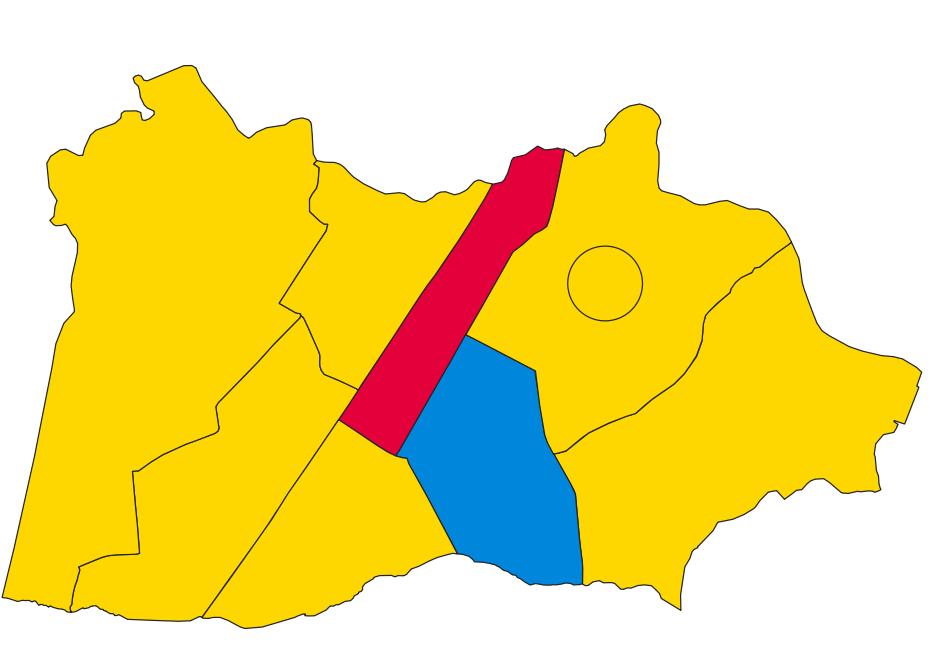
- Map of results of 1962 election
Leader of the Council before election
Conservative
Leader of the Council after election
No overall control

Elections to Sale Council were held on Thursday, 10 May 1962. One third of the councillors were up for election, with each successful candidate to serve a three-year term of office. The Conservative Party lost overall control of the council.

== Election result ==
Party	Votes		Seats			Full Council	
Conservative Party	6,520 (33.9%)	▼6.1	1 (11.1%)	1 / 9	▼5	14 (43.8%)	14 / 32
Liberal Party	9,208 (47.9%)	▲12.2	7 (77.8%)	7 / 9	▲6	12 (37.5%)	12 / 32
Labour Party	3,510 (18.2%)	▼6.1	1 (11.1%)	1 / 9	▼1	6 (18.8%)	6 / 32

=== Full council ===
↓
6	12	14

=== Aldermen ===
↓
1	7

=== Councillors ===
↓
5	12	7

== Ward results ==
=== Brooklands ===
Brooklands
Party	Candidate	Votes	%	±%
Liberal	E. E. Bradley	1,176	55.8	+9.6
Conservative	P. A. A. Pepper*	931	44.2	−9.6
Majority		245	11.6	
Turnout		2,107		
Liberal gain from Conservative		Swing		

=== Mersey ===
Mersey
Party	Candidate	Votes	%	±%
Liberal	A. Howarth*	880	44.7	−6.6
Conservative	F. Leigh	758	38.5	−10.2
Labour	D. Russell	331	16.8	−0.1
Majority		122	6.2	+3.6
Turnout		1,969		
Liberal hold		Swing		

=== St. Anne's ===
St. Anne's (2 vacancies)
Party	Candidate	Votes	%	±%
Liberal	E. M. Parker	1,456	32.2	
Liberal	J. B. Sullivan	1,208	26.7	
Conservative	F. S. Laughton*	877	19.4	
Conservative	M. Schofield	798	17.6	
Labour	K. B. McCaul	188	4.1	
Majority		331	7.3	
Turnout		4,527		
Liberal gain from Conservative		Swing		
Liberal gain from Conservative		Swing		

=== St. John's ===
St. John's
Party	Candidate	Votes	%	±%
Conservative	S. P. Harris*	uncontested		
Conservative hold		Swing		

=== St. Martin's ===
St. Martin's
Party	Candidate	Votes	%	±%
Liberal	R. Lee	1,374	36.9	N/A
Conservative	H. Jackson	1,260	33.8	−15.6
Labour	R. Mee	1,094	29.3	−21.3
Majority		114	3.1	
Turnout		3,728		
Liberal gain from Conservative		Swing		

=== St. Mary's ===
St. Mary's
Party	Candidate	Votes	%	±%
Liberal	G. A. Mitchell	1,233	57.0	+18.7
Conservative	M. Dickinson*	930	43.0	−18.7
Majority		303	14.0	
Turnout		2,163		
Liberal gain from Conservative		Swing		

=== St. Paul's ===
St. Paul's
Party	Candidate	Votes	%	±%
Labour	T. A. Winnington*	614	37.4	
Liberal	J. Cooper	524	31.9	
Conservative	D. Carrington-Brown	504	30.7	
Majority		90	5.5	
Turnout		1,642		
Labour hold		Swing		

=== Sale Moor ===
Sale Moor
Party	Candidate	Votes	%	±%
Liberal	R. Newton	1,357	43.7	−7.4
Labour	W. L. Baddeley	1,283	41.3	−7.6
Conservative	C. Edwards	463	15.0	N/A
Majority		74	2.4	+0.2
Turnout		3,103		
Liberal gain from Labour		Swing		
