= 1950 Sale Municipal Borough Council election =

Local election in England

- 11 May 1950

8 of 32 seats to Sale Municipal Borough Council 16 seats needed for a majority
	First party	Second party
Party	Conservative	Labour
Last election	9 seats, 66.4%	0 seats, 24.3%
Seats before	30	2
Seats won	7	1
Seats after	30	2
Seat change	Steady	Steady
Popular vote	8,429	3,943
Percentage	65.4%	30.6%
Swing	▼1.0%	▲6.3%
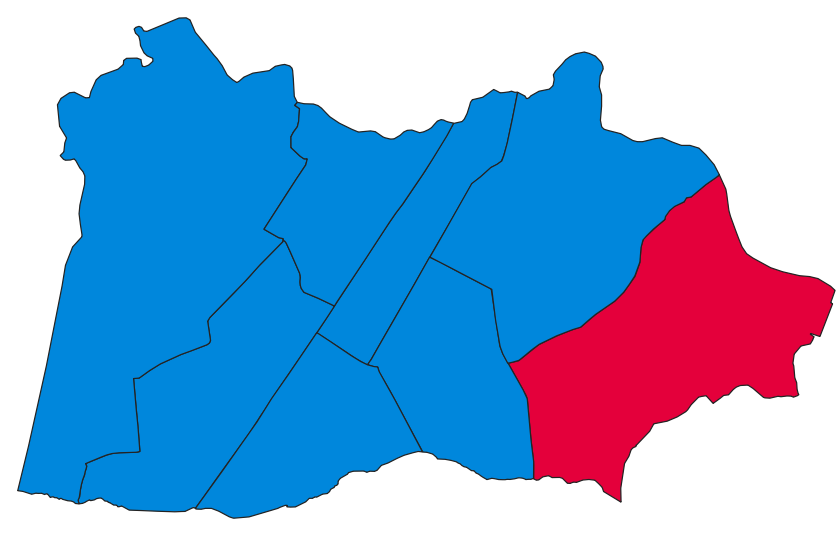
- Map of results of 1950 election
Leader of the Council before election
Conservative
Leader of the Council after election
Conservative

Elections to Sale Council were held on Thursday, 11 May 1950. One third of the councillors were up for election, with each successful candidate to serve a three-year term of office. The Conservative Party retained overall control of the council.

== Election result ==
Party	Votes		Seats			Full Council	
Conservative Party	8,429 (65.4%)	▼1.0	7 (87.5%)	7 / 8	Steady	30 (93.7%)	30 / 32
Labour Party	3,943 (30.6%)	▲6.3	1 (12.5%)	1 / 8	Steady	2 (6.3%)	2 / 32
Liberal Party	457 (3.5%)	N/A	0 (0.0%)	0 / 8	N/A	0 (0.0%)	0 / 32
Communist Party	54 (0.4%)	N/A	0 (0.0%)	0 / 8	N/A	0 (0.0%)	0 / 32

=== Full council ===
↓
2	30

=== Aldermen ===
↓
1	7

=== Councillors ===
↓
1	23

== Ward results ==
=== Brooklands ===
Brooklands
Party	Candidate	Votes	%	±%
Conservative	E. A. Wright*	uncontested		
Conservative hold		Swing		

=== Mersey ===
Mersey
Party	Candidate	Votes	%	±%
Conservative	R. G. Graham*	1,602	75.2	+8.6
Labour	G. Wadsworth	529	24.8	−8.6
Majority		1,073	50.4	+17.2
Turnout		2,131		
Conservative hold		Swing		

=== St. Anne's ===
St. Anne's
Party	Candidate	Votes	%	±%
Conservative	E. W. Wilkins*	uncontested		
Conservative hold		Swing		

=== St. John's ===
St. John's
Party	Candidate	Votes	%	±%
Conservative	S. P. Harris*	1,624	74.0	
Labour	T. Foster	570	26.0	
Majority		1,054	48.0	
Turnout		2,194		
Conservative hold		Swing		

=== St. Martin's ===
St. Martin's
Party	Candidate	Votes	%	±%
Conservative	B. Flinter*	1,444	72.2	
Labour	J. T. Hills	556	27.8	
Majority		888	44.4	
Turnout		2,000		
Conservative hold		Swing		

=== St. Mary's ===
St. Mary's
Party	Candidate	Votes	%	±%
Conservative	M. Dickinson	1,302	74.0	+3.4
Liberal	B. T. Ames	457	26.0	N/A
Majority		845	48.0	+6.8
Turnout		1,759		
Conservative hold		Swing		

=== St. Paul's ===
St. Paul's
Party	Candidate	Votes	%	±%
Conservative	W. L. Beeby*	1,213	57.7	+3.4
Labour	G. A. O'Brien	834	39.7	−6.0
Communist	B. H. Farnworth	54	2.6	N/A
Majority		379	18.0	+9.3
Turnout		2,101		
Conservative hold		Swing		

=== Sale Moor ===
Sale Moor
Party	Candidate	Votes	%	±%
Labour	W. M. Phillips	1,454	53.9	+6.5
Conservative	S. Wheildon	1,244	46.1	−6.5
Majority		210	7.8	
Turnout		2,698		
Labour hold		Swing		
