= 1953 Sale Municipal Borough Council election =

Local election in England

- 7 May 1953

8 of 32 seats to Sale Municipal Borough Council 16 seats needed for a majority
	First party	Second party
Party	Conservative	Labour
Last election	6 seats, 55.8%	2 seats, 40.9%
Seats before	29	3
Seats won	6	2
Seats after	28	4
Seat change	▼1	▲1
Popular vote	4,868	3,876
Percentage	55.7%	44.3%
Swing	▼0.1%	▲3.4%
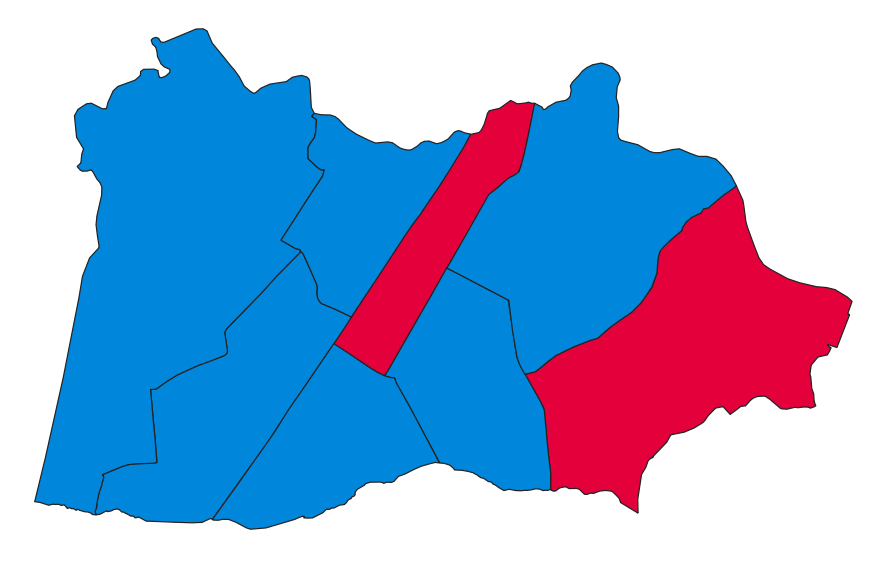
- Map of results of 1953 election
Leader of the Council before election
Conservative
Leader of the Council after election
Conservative

Elections to Sale Council were held on Thursday, 7 May 1953. One third of the councillors were up for election, with each successful candidate to serve a three-year term of office. The Conservative Party retained overall control of the council.

== Election result ==
Party	Votes		Seats			Full Council	
Conservative Party	4,868 (55.7%)	▼0.1	6 (75.0%)	6 / 8	▼1	28 (87.5%)	28 / 32
Labour Party	3,876 (44.3%)	▲3.4	2 (25.0%)	2 / 8	▲1	4 (12.5%)	4 / 32

=== Full council ===
↓
4	28

=== Aldermen ===
↓
8

=== Councillors ===
↓
4	20

== Ward results ==
=== Brooklands ===
Brooklands
Party	Candidate	Votes	%	±%
Conservative	E. A. Wright*	uncontested		
Conservative hold		Swing		

=== Mersey ===
Mersey
Party	Candidate	Votes	%	±%
Conservative	R. G. Graham*	uncontested		
Conservative hold		Swing		

=== St. Anne's ===
St. Anne's
Party	Candidate	Votes	%	±%
Conservative	E. W. Wilkins*	1,427	73.3	
Labour	T. P. Logan	520	26.7	
Majority		907	46.6	
Turnout		1,947		
Conservative hold		Swing		

=== St. John's ===
St. John's
Party	Candidate	Votes	%	±%
Conservative	S. P. Harris*	uncontested		
Conservative hold		Swing		

=== St. Martin's ===
St. Martin's
Party	Candidate	Votes	%	±%
Conservative	B. Flinter*	1,323	68.4	+6.5
Labour	A. Cunion	611	31.6	−6.5
Majority		712	36.8	+13.0
Turnout		1,934		
Conservative hold		Swing		

=== St. Mary's ===
St. Mary's
Party	Candidate	Votes	%	±%
Conservative	M. Dickinson*	uncontested		
Conservative hold		Swing		

=== St. Paul's ===
St. Paul's
Party	Candidate	Votes	%	±%
Labour	J. E. Dickens	1,154	53.0	−0.3
Conservative	F. Leigh	1,025	47.0	+0.3
Majority		129	6.0	−0.6
Turnout		2,179		
Labour gain from Conservative		Swing		

=== Sale Moor ===
Sale Moor
Party	Candidate	Votes	%	±%
Labour	W. M. Phillips*	1,591	59.3	+9.0
Conservative	P. A. A. Pepper	1,093	40.7	−9.0
Majority		498	18.6	+18.0
Turnout		2,684		
Labour hold		Swing		
