= 1991 Llanelli Borough Council election =

Welsh local election

An election to Llanelli Borough Council was held in May 1991. It was preceded by the 1987 election and followed, as a result of local government reorganisation in Wales and the formation of unitary authorities, by the Carmarthenshire County Council election of 1995. On the same day there were elections to the other district local authorities and community councils in Wales.

== Overview ==
The Labour Party faced further losses as various other parties won seats throughout the borough, including the Green Party, which won seats for the first time.

== Boundary changes ==
There were no boundary changes.

== Results by ward ==
=== Bigyn (three seats) ===
Bigyn 1991
Party	Candidate	Votes	%	±%
Independent	William J. Marks*	1,296		
Liberal Democrats	Margaret N. Burree	1,124		
Independent	Richard Ivor John	1,017		
Labour	David Charles Prothero	977		
Labour	Keri Peter Thomas	919		
Labour	J. Williams	895		
Turnout			47.5	
Independent hold		Swing		
Liberal Democrats gain from Labour		Swing		
Independent gain from Labour		Swing		

=== Burry Port (three seats) ===
Burry Port 1991
Party	Candidate	Votes	%	±%
Labour	Vincent John Rees*	652		
Liberal Democrats	Keith John Evans	614		
Independent	George W. West	608		
Labour	B. Davies	564		
Plaid Cymru	H.M. Tierney	545		
Independent	K. Roberts	517		
Labour	D.H. Morris	476		
Plaid Cymru	D. Williams	413		
Independent Labour	A.H.P. Phillips*	274		
Turnout			49.5	
Labour hold		Swing		
Liberal Democrats gain from Labour		Swing		
Independent hold		Swing		

=== Bynea (one seat) ===
Bynea 1991
Party	Candidate	Votes	%	±%
Green	Marcus Hughes	514	50.8	
Labour	T. Lewis	498	49.2	
Majority		16	1.6	
Turnout			47.9	
Green gain from Labour		Swing		

=== Cross Hands (one seat) ===
Cross Hands 1991
Party	Candidate	Votes	%	±%
Labour	Philip Brinley Davies*	Unopposed	N/A	N/A
Labour hold				

=== Dafen (two seats) ===
Dafen 1991
Party	Candidate	Votes	%	±%
Green	Brian Stringer	643		
Labour	L.R. McDonagh*	482		
Independent Labour	M. Adams	372		
Labour	E. Evans	323		
Independent	P. Silcox	106		
Turnout			45.9	
Green gain from Labour		Swing		
Labour hold		Swing		

=== Elli (two seats) ===
Elli 1991
Party	Candidate	Votes	%	±%
Independent	W.H. Griffiths*	751		
Independent	D. Jones	613		
Labour	William Edward Skinner	478		
Liberal Democrats	Nicholas C. Burree	477		
Labour	E.J. Israel	276		
Turnout			48.6	
Independent hold		Swing		
Independent gain from Liberal Democrats		Swing		

=== Felinfoel (one seat) ===
Felinfoel 1991
Party	Candidate	Votes	%	±%
Labour	Henry John Evans*	483		
Independent	P. Donoghue	231		
Majority		252		
Turnout			44.4	
Labour hold		Swing		

=== Glanymor (two seats) ===
Glanymor 1991
Party	Candidate	Votes	%	±%
Labour	David Tudor James*	1,228		
Labour	K. Davies	1,120		
Green	J. Taylor	503		
Turnout			46.2	
Labour hold		Swing		
Labour hold		Swing		

=== Glyn (one seat) ===
Glyn 1991
Party	Candidate	Votes	%	±%
Independent Labour	Dynfor Vaughan Owens*	613	64.9	
Labour	N. Duston	332	35.1	
Majority			29.7	
Turnout			59.3	
Independent Labour hold		Swing		

=== Hendy (one seat) ===
Hendy 1991
Party	Candidate	Votes	%	±%
Plaid Cymru	T.R. Evans	742	65.4	
Labour	L. Jenkins	393	34.6	
Majority			30.8	
Turnout			52.1	
Plaid Cymru gain from Labour		Swing		

=== Hengoed (two seats) ===
Hengoed 1991
Party	Candidate	Votes	%	±%
Independent	Denis G. Woolley	727		
Labour	W.R. Jones*	591		
Green	E. Taylor	544		
Labour	D.K. Williams	469		
Turnout			46.9	
Independent gain from Alliance		Swing		
Labour hold		Swing		

=== Kidwelly (one seat) ===
Kidwelly 1991
Party	Candidate	Votes	%	±%
Labour	Gwilym Glanmor Jones*	1,076	66.3	
Green	John Burns	290	17.9	
Independent	E.C. Whatley	258	15.9	
Turnout			65.1	
Labour hold		Swing		

=== Llangennech (two seats) ===
Llangennech 1991
Party	Candidate	Votes	%	±%
Independent	Cerith David Thomas*	825		
Labour	Sefton Ronald Coslett*	749		
Labour	John Willock	620		
Independent	J. Sturgess	533		
Turnout			47.9	
Independent hold		Swing		
Labour hold		Swing		

=== Lliedi (two seats) ===
Lliedi 1991
Party	Candidate	Votes	%	±%
Liberal Democrats	Elinor Gem Lloyd*	1,011		
Independent	F.St.J. Roberts*	905		
Labour	T.J. Price	650		
Liberal Democrats	Jonathan Edward Burree	586		
Labour	W.G. Thomas	559		
Turnout			44.2	
Liberal Democrats hold		Swing		
Independent hold		Swing		

=== Llwynhendy (two seats) ===
Llwynhendy 1991
Party	Candidate	Votes	%	±%
Labour	Thomas Dillwyn Bowen*	652		
Labour	Donald John Davies	628		
Independent	John Trafford Howell	477		
Green	J. Richards	470		
Independent	H. Atkinson	374		
Turnout			40.3	
Labour hold		Swing		
Labour hold		Swing		

=== Pembrey (one seat) ===
Pembrey 1991
Party	Candidate	Votes	%	±%
Labour	Trevor Uriel Jones Thomas*	675	57.0	
Plaid Cymru	Raymond L. Hall	510	43.0	
Majority		165		
Turnout			40.3	
Labour hold		Swing		

=== Pontyberem (one seat) ===
Pontyberem 1991
Party	Candidate	Votes	%	±%
Labour	Alban William Rees*	684	50.1	
Independent Labour	Thomas Ieuan Edwards	680	49.9	
Majority		4	0.2	
Turnout			62.9	
Labour hold		Swing		

=== Swiss Valley (one seat) ===
Swiss Valley 1991
Party	Candidate	Votes	%	±%
Labour	V.B. Hitchman	482	55.0	
Independent	B.M. Willis	394	45.0	
Majority		88	10.0	
Turnout			42.4	
Labour gain from Independent		Swing		

=== Trimsaran (one seat) ===
Trimsaran 1991
Party	Candidate	Votes	%	±%
Labour	H.W. Jenkins*	687	61.6	
Independent	D. Emanuel	428	38.4	
Majority		259		
Turnout			54.0	
Labour hold		Swing		

=== Tumble (two seats) ===
Tumble 1991
Party	Candidate	Votes	%	±%
Labour	David Bryan Richards	776		
Labour	J.W.V. Harris*	762		
Independent	B. Lewis	654		
Independent	R. Jones	615		
Turnout			48.1	
Labour hold		Swing		
Labour hold		Swing		

=== Tycroes (one seat) ===
Tycroes 1991
Party	Candidate	Votes	%	±%
Labour	G.J. Jones*	Unopposed	N/A	N/A
Labour hold				

=== Tyisha (two seats) ===
Tyisha 1991
Party	Candidate	Votes	%	±%
Labour	David Samuel Neil*	1,022		
Labour	Harry Palmer*	965		
Plaid Cymru	Dyfrig Thomas	817		
Turnout			48.1	
Labour hold		Swing		
Labour hold		Swing		

== By-elections between 1991 and 1995 ==
=== Hendy by-election 1993 (one seat) ===
A by-election was held in the Hendy ward following the death of Labour councillor Len McDonagh. The contest was won by a single vote by Plaid Cymru candidate Gwyn Hopkins, who had previously served as a member of Dyfed County Council from 1977 until 1981.

Hendy 1991
Party	Candidate	Votes	%	±%
Plaid Cymru	William Gwyn Hopkins	426		
Labour	Vernon John Warlow	425		
Majority		1		
Turnout				
Plaid Cymru gain from Labour		Swing		
