= 1951 Sale Municipal Borough Council election =

Local election in England

- 10 May 1951

9 of 32 seats to Sale Municipal Borough Council 16 seats needed for a majority
	First party	Second party
Party	Conservative	Labour
Last election	7 seats, 65.4%	1 seats, 30.6%
Seats before	31	1
Seats won	9	0
Seats after	31	1
Seat change	Steady	Steady
Popular vote	7,879	3,131
Percentage	68.5%	27.2%
Swing	▲3.1%	▼3.4%
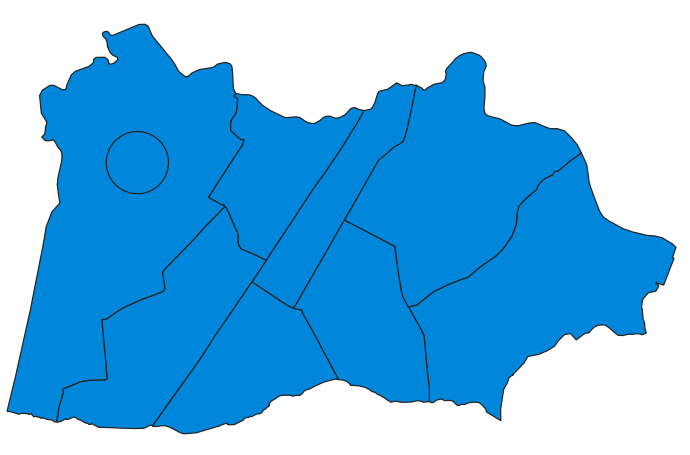
- Map of results of 1951 election
Leader of the Council before election
Conservative
Leader of the Council after election
Conservative

Elections to Sale Council were held on Thursday, 10 May 1951. One third of the councillors were up for election, with each successful candidate to serve a three-year term of office. The Conservative Party retained overall control of the council.

== Election result ==
Party	Votes		Seats			Full Council	
Conservative Party	7,879 (68.5%)	▲3.1	9 (100.0%)	9 / 9	Steady	31 (96.9%)	31 / 32
Labour Party	3,131 (27.2%)	▼3.4	0 (0.0%)	0 / 9	Steady	1 (3.1%)	1 / 32
Liberal Party	490 (4.3%)	▲0.8	0 (0.0%)	0 / 9	Steady	0 (0.0%)	0 / 32

=== Full council ===
↓
1	31

=== Aldermen ===
↓
8

=== Councillors ===
↓
1	23

== Ward results ==
=== Brooklands ===
Brooklands
Party	Candidate	Votes	%	±%
Conservative	J. G. Steel*	uncontested		
Conservative hold		Swing		

=== Mersey ===
Mersey
Party	Candidate	Votes	%	±%
Conservative	W. A. Jones*	uncontested		
Conservative hold		Swing		

=== St. Anne's ===
St. Anne's
Party	Candidate	Votes	%	±%
Conservative	F. S. Laughton*	uncontested		
Conservative hold		Swing		

=== St. John's ===
St. John's
Party	Candidate	Votes	%	±%
Conservative	C. J. Hobson	1,580	73.8	−0.2
Labour	L. G. Ditcham	562	26.2	+0.2
Majority		1,018	47.6	−0.4
Turnout		2,142		
Conservative hold		Swing		

=== St. Martin's ===
St. Martin's (2 vacancies)
Party	Candidate	Votes	%	±%
Conservative	J. K. Kerr	1,285	40.9	
Conservative	R. M. Willan*	1,245	39.6	
Labour	E. W. Brownjohn	615	19.6	
Majority		630	20.0	
Turnout		3,145		
Conservative hold		Swing		
Conservative hold		Swing		

=== St. Mary's ===
St. Mary's
Party	Candidate	Votes	%	±%
Conservative	E. Lee	1,208	71.1	−2.9
Liberal	B. T. Ames	490	28.9	+2.9
Majority		718	42.2	−5.8
Turnout		1,698		
Conservative hold		Swing		

=== St. Paul's ===
St. Paul's
Party	Candidate	Votes	%	±%
Conservative	V. S. Webb*	1,083	58.7	+1.0
Labour	A. Howarth	761	41.3	+1.6
Majority		322	17.6	−0.4
Turnout		1,844		
Conservative hold		Swing		

=== Sale Moor ===
Sale Moor
Party	Candidate	Votes	%	±%
Conservative	L. Bethell*	1,478	55.3	+9.2
Labour	C. B. Bloor	1,193	44.7	−9.2
Majority		285	10.7	
Turnout		2,671		
Conservative hold		Swing		
