= Municipal Borough of Sale =

Former local government area in the UK

Coordinates: 53.424°N 2.322°W

Sale
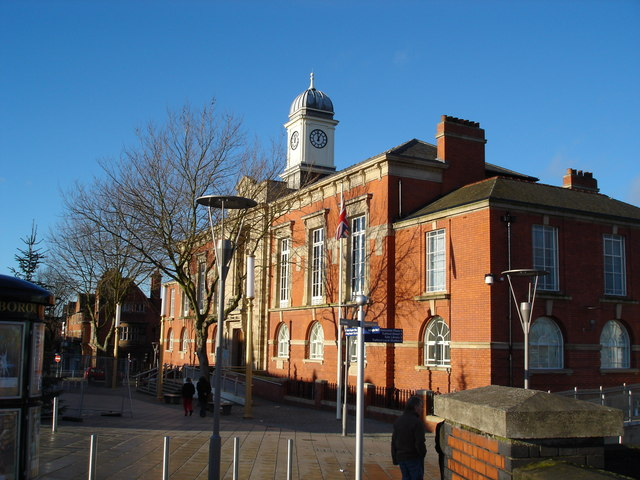
- Sale Town Hall

- Sale within Cheshire in 1970
- Area
  - 1891: 2,006 acres (8.12 km^{2})
  - 1931: 3,629 acres (14.69 km^{2})
  - 1961: 3,629 acres (14.69 km^{2})
- Population
  - 1891: 9,644
  - 1931: 28,071
  - 1971: 55,749
- History
  - Created: 1867
  - Abolished: 1974
  - Succeeded by: Metropolitan Borough of Trafford
- Status: Local board of health 1867–1894 Urban district 1894–1935 Municipal borough 1935–1974
- Government
  - HQ: Sale Town Hall
  - Motto: Salus et Felicitas (Health and happiness)
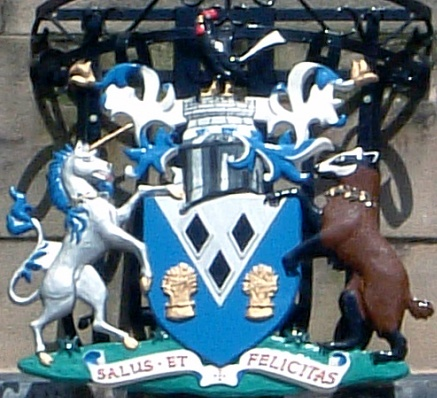

Sale was, from 1867 to 1974, a district in Cheshire, England. The district had in turn the status of local government district, urban district and municipal borough. Its area now forms part of the Metropolitan Borough of Trafford, Greater Manchester.

== Local Board and Urban District ==
On 15 November 1866 the ratepayers of the township of Sale adopted the Local Government Act 1858, and a Local Board was formed to govern the town in January 1867. From 1889 it was a part of the administrative county of Cheshire. The Local Government Act 1894 reconstituted the Local Board's area as Sale Urban District. An urban district council of 15 members replaced the local board. The neighbouring town of Ashton upon Mersey became an urban district in 1895. In 1930 a county review order merged Ashton upon Mersey Urban District into Sale UD.

In December 1933 a petition was submitted to the Privy Council praying for a charter of incorporation to raise the urban district to the status of a municipal borough. At the time, Sale was the urban district with the largest population and highest rateable value in the county. The petition was successful, and the charter was presented by Sir William Bromley-Davenport the Lord Lieutenant of Cheshire on 21 September 1935. The first elections to the borough council were held on 1 November.

=== Political control ===
The borough council consisted of a mayor, eight aldermen and twenty-four councillors. One-third of the councillors were elected annually, and half of the aldermen were chosen by the council every three years.

The council initially consisted of a number of groupings, with none in a majority. Except for members of the Conservative and Labour parties, Independent, "Owner-Occupier" and "Trader" candidates were elected. In 1946 the Conservatives gained an overall majority, which they held until 1962. Opposition was provided by Labour and Liberal councillors. From 1962 to 1965 the council was under no overall control, with the Liberals forming the largest party. Conservatives regained control in 1965 and held it until 1972. The latter year saw the last election before the borough's abolition, and the final council was hung, with sixteen Conservatives balanced by ten Labour and six Liberal members.

Party	Period
Independent	1935-1937
No overall control	1937
Conservative	1937-1938
No overall control	1938-1946
Conservative	1946-1962
No overall control	1962-1964
Liberal	1964
No overall control	1964-1965
Conservative	1965-1974

=== Coat of arms ===
Sale Urban District Council was granted armorial bearings by the College of Arms by letters patent dated 23 September 1920. The blazon was as follows:

Azure, on a pile argent between two garbs Or, three lozenges sable, and for a Crest on a wreath of the colours, upon the battlements of a tower argent a moorcock sable combed and wattled gules beaked and legged Or.

The gold "garbs" or wheatsheaves on a blue field were county emblems, appearing in the arms of Cheshire County Council and the Earldom of Chester. The three black lozenges on white were from the arms of the Massey family of Sale. The crest above the shield was a black "moorcock" representing Sale Moor.

The Latin motto adopted was Salus et felicitas or "health and happiness": the first word was a pun on the name of the town.

The arms continued in use by the borough council on incorporation in 1935. An additional grant of heraldic supporters was made on 15 August 1945 to commemorate the tenth anniversary of borough status:

On the dexter side a unicorn argent, armed and unguled Or, maned and tufted azure, and on the sinister side a badger proper, each gorged with a wreath of salllow twigs also proper.

The unicorn represented Ashton-upon-Mersey, and was derived from the arms of the Carrington family. The badger or "brock" stood for the Brooklands area. Both supporters wore collars made of sallow twigs, another reference to the town's name.

== Abolition ==
The municipal borough was abolished in 1974 as a result of the Local Government Act 1972, which abolished all municipal boroughs. Sale became a part of the Metropolitan Borough of Trafford, in Greater Manchester.

== Local elections ==
- 1935 Sale Municipal Borough Council election
- 1936 Sale Municipal Borough Council election
- 1937 Sale Municipal Borough Council election
- 1938 Sale Municipal Borough Council election
- 1945 Sale Municipal Borough Council election
- 1946 Sale Municipal Borough Council election
- 1947 Sale Municipal Borough Council election
- 1949 Sale Municipal Borough Council election
- 1950 Sale Municipal Borough Council election
- 1951 Sale Municipal Borough Council election
- 1952 Sale Municipal Borough Council election
- 1953 Sale Municipal Borough Council election
- 1954 Sale Municipal Borough Council election
- 1955 Sale Municipal Borough Council election
- 1956 Sale Municipal Borough Council election
- 1957 Sale Municipal Borough Council election
- 1958 Sale Municipal Borough Council election
- 1959 Sale Municipal Borough Council election
- 1960 Sale Municipal Borough Council election
- 1961 Sale Municipal Borough Council election
- 1962 Sale Municipal Borough Council election
- 1963 Sale Municipal Borough Council election
- 1964 Sale Municipal Borough Council election
- 1965 Sale Municipal Borough Council election
- 1966 Sale Municipal Borough Council election
- 1967 Sale Municipal Borough Council election
- 1968 Sale Municipal Borough Council election
- 1969 Sale Municipal Borough Council election
- 1970 Sale Municipal Borough Council election
- 1971 Sale Municipal Borough Council election
- 1972 Sale Municipal Borough Council election
