= 1947 Sale Municipal Borough Council election =

Local election in England

- 1 November 1947

8 of 32 seats to Sale Municipal Borough Council 16 seats needed for a majority
| | First party | Second party | Third party |
|---|---|---|---|
| Party | Conservative | Labour | Residents |
| Last election | 7 seats, 59.6% | 1 seats, 22.1% | 0 seats, 13.1% |
| Seats before | 21 | 6 | 4 |
| Seats won | 8 | 0 | 0 |
| Seats after | 24 | 5 | 2 |
| Seat change | ▲3 | ▼1 | ▼2 |
| Popular vote | 10,607 | 3,725 | 1,315 |
| Percentage | 66.6% | 23.4% | 8.3% |
| Swing | ▲7.0% | ▲1.3% | ▼4.8% |
| | Fourth party |
| Party | Independent |
| Last election | 0 seats, 0.0% |
| Seats before | 1 |
| Seats won | 0 |
| Seats after | 1 |
| Seat change | Steady |
| Popular vote | 0 |
| Percentage | 0.0% |
| Swing | Steady |
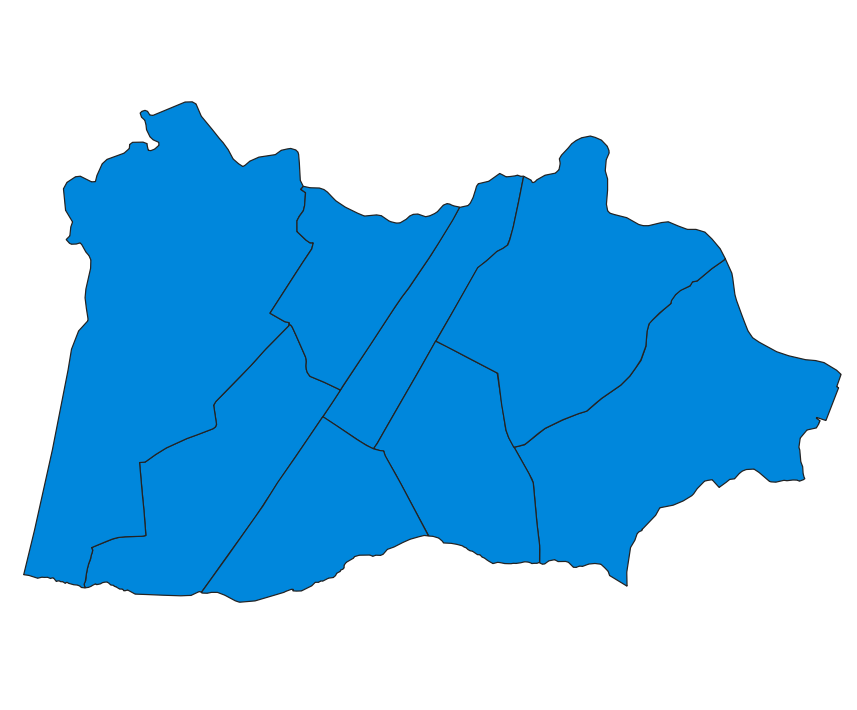
- Map of results of 1947 election
Leader of the Council before election
Conservative
Leader of the Council after election
Conservative

Elections to Sale Council were held on Saturday, 1 November 1947. One third of the councillors were up for election, with each successful candidate to serve a three-year term of office. The Conservative Party retained overall control of the council.

== Election result ==
| Party | Votes | | Seats | | | Full Council | |
| Conservative Party | 10,607 (66.6%) | ▲7.0 | 8 (100.0%) | 8 / 8 | ▲3 | 24 (75.0%) | 24 / 32 |
| Labour Party | 3,725 (23.4%) | ▲1.3 | 0 (0.0%) | 0 / 8 | ▼1 | 5 (15.6%) | 5 / 32 |
| Residents | 1,315 (8.3%) | ▼4.8 | 0 (0.0%) | 0 / 8 | ▼2 | 2 (6.3%) | 2 / 32 |
| Independent | 0 (0.0%) | Steady | 0 (0.0%) | 0 / 8 | Steady | 1 (3.1%) | 1 / 32 |
| Liberal Party | 275 (1.7%) | ▼1.3 | 0 (0.0%) | 0 / 8 | Steady | 0 (0.0%) | 0 / 32 |

=== Full council ===
↓
| 5 | 2 | 1 | 24 |

=== Aldermen ===
↓
| 2 | 6 |

=== Councillors ===
↓
| 3 | 2 | 1 | 18 |

== Ward results ==
=== Brooklands ===
Brooklands
| Party | Candidate | Votes | % | ±% |
|---|---|---|---|---|
| Conservative | J. G. Steel* | uncontested | | |
| Conservative hold | | Swing | | |

=== Mersey ===
Mersey
| Party | Candidate | Votes | % | ±% |
|---|---|---|---|---|
| Conservative | W. A. Jones* | 2,062 | 72.6 | +7.8 |
| Labour | A. Howarth | 777 | 27.4 | −7.8 |
| Majority | | 1,285 | 45.2 | +15.6 |
| Turnout | | 2,839 | | |
| Conservative hold | | Swing | | |

=== St. Anne's ===
St. Anne's
| Party | Candidate | Votes | % | ±% |
|---|---|---|---|---|
| Conservative | F. H. Highley* | uncontested | | |
| Conservative hold | | Swing | | |

=== St. John's ===
St. John's
| Party | Candidate | Votes | % | ±% |
|---|---|---|---|---|
| Conservative | J. G. McBeath* | 1,926 | 73.8 | −14.5 |
| Labour | M. Ogden | 685 | 26.2 | N/A |
| Majority | | 1,241 | 47.6 | −29.1 |
| Turnout | | 2,611 | | |
| Conservative hold | | Swing | | |

=== St. Martin's ===
St. Martin's
| Party | Candidate | Votes | % | ±% |
|---|---|---|---|---|
| Conservative | R. M. Willan | 1,487 | 70.7 | +21.1 |
| Residents | T. Marriott-Moore | 614 | 29.2 | +0.3 |
| Majority | | 873 | 41.5 | +20.8 |
| Turnout | | 2,101 | | |
| Conservative gain from Residents | | Swing | | |

=== St. Mary's ===
St. Mary's
| Party | Candidate | Votes | % | ±% |
|---|---|---|---|---|
| Conservative | G. Elliott | 1,838 | 72.4 | +15.3 |
| Residents | R. C. Lynden | 701 | 27.6 | −15.3 |
| Majority | | 1,137 | 44.8 | +30.7 |
| Turnout | | 2,539 | | |
| Conservative gain from Residents | | Swing | | |

=== St. Paul's ===
St. Paul's
| Party | Candidate | Votes | % | ±% |
|---|---|---|---|---|
| Conservative | V. S. Webb | 1,676 | 55.8 | +1.9 |
| Labour | F. Dickens* | 1,326 | 44.2 | +5.2 |
| Majority | | 350 | 11.7 | −3.1 |
| Turnout | | 3,002 | | |
| Conservative gain from Labour | | Swing | | |

=== Sale Moor ===
Sale Moor
| Party | Candidate | Votes | % | ±% |
|---|---|---|---|---|
| Conservative | L. Bethell* | 1,618 | 57.2 | +22.5 |
| Labour | H. Dean | 937 | 33.1 | −5.6 |
| Liberal | S. G. Ford | 275 | 9.7 | −16.9 |
| Majority | | 681 | 24.1 | |
| Turnout | | 2,830 | | |
| Conservative hold | | Swing | | |
