= 1938 Sale Municipal Borough Council election =

English local election

- 1 November 1938

8 of 32 seats to Sale Municipal Borough Council 16 seats needed for a majority
	First party	Second party	Third party
Party	Conservative	Independent	Labour
Last election	2 seats, 30.0%	4 seats, 40.2%	0 seats, 13.2%
Seats before	16	10	4
Seats won	2	3	1
Seats after	14	10	4
Seat change	▼2	Steady	Steady
Popular vote	2,437	1,243	1,948
Percentage	32.2%	16.4%	25.7%
Swing	▲2.2%	▼24.2%	▲12.5%
	Fourth party	Fifth party
Party	Residents	Chamber of Trade
Last election	0 seats, 10.6%	1 seats, 6.0%
Seats before	1	1
Seats won	2	0
Seats after	3	1
Seat change	▲2	Steady
Popular vote	1,949	0
Percentage	25.7%	0.0%
Swing	▲15.2%	▼6.0%
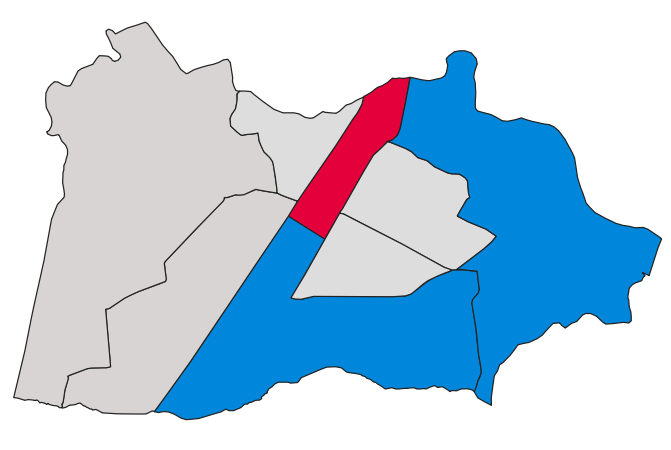
- Map of results of 1938 election
Leader of the Council before election
Conservative
Leader of the Council after election
No overall control

Elections to Sale Council were held on Tuesday, 1 November 1938. One third of the councillors were up for election, with each successful candidate to serve a three-year term of office. The Conservative Party lost overall control of the council. These were the last local elections held in Sale until after the end of the Second World War.

== Election result ==
Party	Votes		Seats			Full Council	
Conservative Party	2,437 (32.2%)	▲2.2	2 (25.0%)	2 / 8	▼2	14 (43.1%)	14 / 32
Independent	1,243 (16.4%)	▼24.2	3 (37.5%)	3 / 8	Steady	10 (31.3%)	10 / 32
Labour Party	1,948 (25.7%)	▲12.5	1 (12.5%)	1 / 8	Steady	4 (12.5%)	4 / 32
Residents	1,949 (25.7%)	▲15.1	2 (25.0%)	2 / 8	▲2	3 (9.4%)	3 / 32
Chamber of Trade	0 (0.0%)	▼6.0	0 (0.0%)	0 / 8	Steady	1 (3.1%)	1 / 32

=== Full council ===
↓
4	3	10	1	14

=== Aldermen ===
↓
2	6

=== Councillors ===
↓
2	3	10	1	8

== Ward results ==
=== Central ===
Central
Party	Candidate	Votes	%	±%
Independent	J. G. McBeath*	uncontested		
Independent hold		Swing		

=== East ===
East
Party	Candidate	Votes	%	±%
Conservative	L. Bethell	1,023	57.2	
Labour	H. A. Phillips	765	42.8	
Majority		258	14.4	
Turnout		1,788		
Conservative hold		Swing		

=== Mersey ===
Mersey
Party	Candidate	Votes	%	±%
Independent	M. G. Bird*	uncontested		
Independent hold		Swing		

=== North ===
North
Party	Candidate	Votes	%	±%
Independent	F. H. Highley*	759	58.8	−2.2
Labour	H. C. Wade	532	41.2	N/A
Majority		227	17.6	−4.4
Turnout		1,291		
Independent hold		Swing		

=== St. Martin's ===
St. Martin's
Party	Candidate	Votes	%	±%
Residents	L. House	1,145	64.4	+16.1
Conservative	E. D. Phillips*	632	35.6	−16.1
Majority		513	28.8	
Turnout		1,777		
Residents gain from Conservative		Swing		

=== St. Mary's ===
St. Mary's
Party	Candidate	Votes	%	±%
Residents	S. Clegg	804	50.7	N/A
Conservative	R. Jamieson	782	49.3	−18.4
Majority		22	1.4	
Turnout		1,586		
Residents gain from Conservative		Swing		

=== South ===
South
Party	Candidate	Votes	%	±%
Conservative	A. W. Mawer*	uncontested		
Conservative hold		Swing		

=== West ===
West
Party	Candidate	Votes	%	±%
Labour	F. Dickens*	651	57.4	+11.6
Independent	J. F. Barnes	484	42.6	−11.6
Majority		167	14.8	
Turnout		1,135		
Labour hold		Swing		
