= 1955 Sale Municipal Borough Council election =

Local election in England

- 12 May 1955

8 of 32 seats to Sale Municipal Borough Council 16 seats needed for a majority
	First party	Second party
Party	Conservative	Labour
Last election	7 seats, 57.0%	1 seats, 35.7%
Seats before	26	6
Seats won	7	1
Seats after	27	5
Seat change	▲1	▼1
Popular vote	3,463	3,071
Percentage	53.0%	47.0%
Swing	▼4.0%	▲12.3%
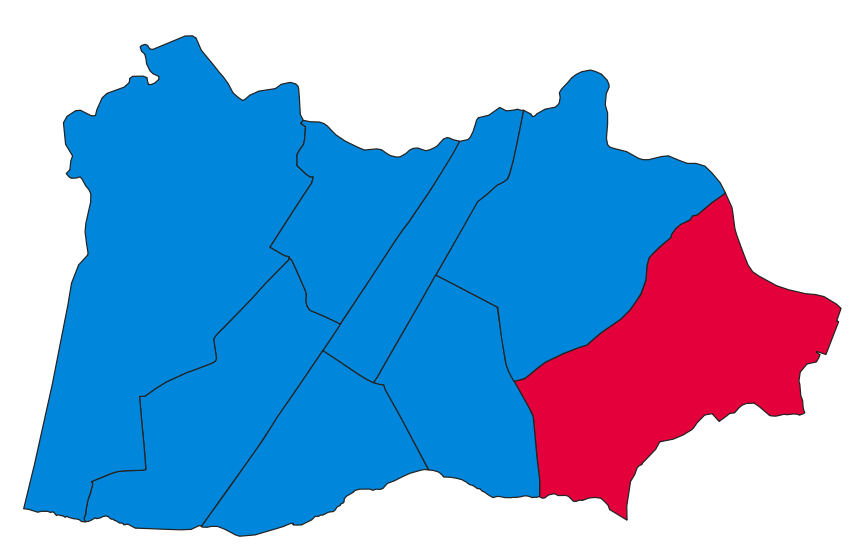
- Map of results of 1955 election
Leader of the Council before election
Conservative
Leader of the Council after election
Conservative

Elections to Sale Council were held on Thursday, 12 May 1955. One third of the councillors were up for election, with each successful candidate to serve a three-year term of office. The Conservative Party retained overall control of the council.

== Election result ==
Party	Votes		Seats			Full Council	
Conservative Party	3,463 (53.0%)	▼4.0	7 (87.5%)	7 / 8	▲1	27 (84.4%)	27 / 32
Labour Party	3,071 (47.0%)	▲12.3	1 (12.5%)	1 / 8	▼1	5 (15.6%)	5 / 32

=== Full council ===
↓
5	27

=== Aldermen ===
↓
8

=== Councillors ===
↓
5	19

== Ward results ==
=== Brooklands ===
Brooklands
Party	Candidate	Votes	%	±%
Conservative	A. G. Goodliffe*	uncontested		
Conservative hold		Swing		

=== Mersey ===
Mersey
Party	Candidate	Votes	%	±%
Conservative	H. H. Cunliffe*	uncontested		
Conservative hold		Swing		

=== St. Anne's ===
St. Anne's
Party	Candidate	Votes	%	±%
Conservative	C. C. James*	uncontested		
Conservative hold		Swing		

=== St. John's ===
St. John's
Party	Candidate	Votes	%	±%
Conservative	R. G. Taylor*	uncontested		
Conservative hold		Swing		

=== St. Martin's ===
St. Martin's
Party	Candidate	Votes	%	±%
Conservative	R. M. Willan*	1,293	58.0	−1.8
Labour	W. Munro	938	42.0	+1.8
Majority		355	16.0	−3.6
Turnout		2,231		
Conservative hold		Swing		

=== St. Mary's ===
St. Mary's
Party	Candidate	Votes	%	±%
Conservative	M. Cave*	uncontested		
Conservative hold		Swing		

=== St. Paul's ===
St. Paul's
Party	Candidate	Votes	%	±%
Conservative	F. Leigh	1,043	53.4	+6.6
Labour	T. A. Winnington*	911	46.6	−6.6
Majority		132	6.8	
Turnout		1,954		
Conservative gain from Labour		Swing		

=== Sale Moor ===
Sale Moor
Party	Candidate	Votes	%	±%
Labour	J. Conway*	1,222	52.0	+5.5
Conservative	P. T. Byland	1,127	48.0	−5.5
Majority		95	4.0	
Turnout		2,349		
Labour hold		Swing		

== By-elections between 1955 and 1956 ==
Mersey By-election 8 March 1956
Party	Candidate	Votes	%	±%
Liberal	L. Stockdale	810	60.0	
Conservative	D. Young	541	40.0	
Majority		269	20.0	
Turnout		1,351		
Liberal gain from Conservative		Swing		
