= 1957 Sale Municipal Borough Council election =

Local election in Cheshire, England

- 9 May 1957

8 of 32 seats to Sale Municipal Borough Council 16 seats needed for a majority
	First party	Second party	Third party
Party	Conservative	Labour	Liberal
Last election	5 seats, 47.4%	2 seats, 35.1%	1 seats, 14.4%
Seats before	25	5	2
Seats won	4	2	2
Seats after	24	5	3
Seat change	▼1	Steady	▲1
Popular vote	5,688	3,599	2,613
Percentage	47.8%	30.2%	22.0%
Swing	▲0.4%	▼4.9%	▲7.6%
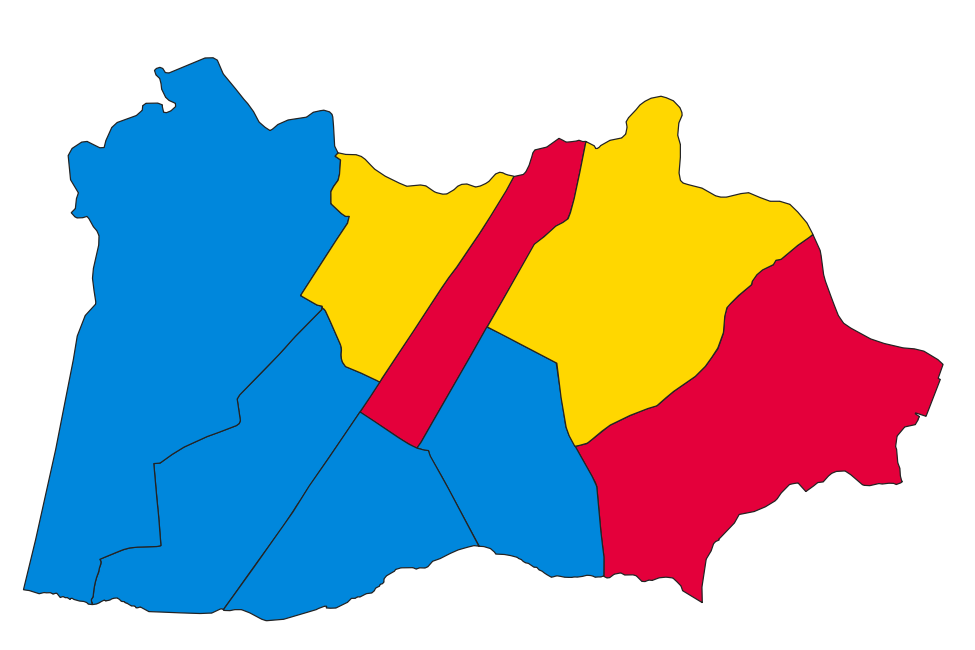
- Map of results of 1957 election
Leader of the Council before election
Conservative
Leader of the Council after election
Conservative

Elections to Sale Council were held on Thursday, 9 May 1957. One third of the councillors were up for election, with each successful candidate to serve a three-year term of office. The Conservative Party retained overall control of the council.

== Election result ==
Party	Votes		Seats			Full Council	
Conservative Party	5,688 (47.8%)	▲0.4	4 (50.0%)	4 / 8	▼1	24 (75.0%)	24 / 32
Labour Party	3,599 (30.2%)	▼4.9	2 (25.0%)	2 / 8	Steady	5 (15.6%)	5 / 32
Liberal Party	2,613 (22.0%)	▲7.6	2 (25.0%)	2 / 8	▲1	3 (9.4%)	3 / 32

=== Full council ===
↓
5	3	24

=== Aldermen ===
↓
8

=== Councillors ===
↓
5	3	16

== Ward results ==
=== Brooklands ===
Brooklands
Party	Candidate	Votes	%	±%
Conservative	E. P. R. Ainsworth	uncontested		
Conservative hold		Swing		

=== Mersey ===
Mersey
Party	Candidate	Votes	%	±%
Liberal	L. Stockdale*	908	64.3	N/A
Conservative	A. Wilkinson	505	35.7	−24.0
Majority		403	29.5	
Turnout		1,413		
Liberal hold		Swing		

=== St. Anne's ===
St. Anne's
Party	Candidate	Votes	%	±%
Liberal	J. A. Tovey	1,072	50.7	−7.8
Conservative	F. S. Laughton*	1,044	49.3	+7.8
Majority		28	1.3	−15.7
Turnout		2,116		
Liberal gain from Conservative		Swing		

=== St. John's ===
St. John's
Party	Candidate	Votes	%	±%
Conservative	C. J. Hobson*	uncontested		
Conservative hold		Swing		

=== St. Martin's ===
St. Martin's
Party	Candidate	Votes	%	±%
Conservative	R. S. Heath	1,563	58.3	+2.1
Labour	W. Munro	1,120	41.7	−2.1
Majority		443	16.5	+4.1
Turnout		2,683		
Conservative hold		Swing		

=== St. Mary's ===
St. Mary's
Party	Candidate	Votes	%	±%
Conservative	E. Lee*	782	55.3	−6.9
Liberal	L. Jones	633	44.7	+6.9
Majority		149	10.5	−13.9
Turnout		1,415		
Conservative hold		Swing		

=== St. Paul's ===
St. Paul's
Party	Candidate	Votes	%	±%
Labour	C. G. Woodward*	961	61.9	+6.5
Conservative	E. Cowgill	592	38.1	+5.0
Majority		429	27.6	+5.3
Turnout		1,553		
Labour hold		Swing		

=== Sale Moor ===
Sale Moor
Party	Candidate	Votes	%	±%
Labour	G. A. O'Brien*	1,518	55.8	−5.3
Conservative	A. Gresty	1,202	44.2	+5.7
Majority		316	11.6	−11.4
Turnout		2,720		
Labour hold		Swing		
