= Charles Mapp =

British Labour Party politician

Charles Mapp (1903 – 3 May 1978) was a British Labour Party politician.

From a working-class background, Mapp won a scholarship to a grammar school. He worked as a railway goods agent, and was elected to Sale Borough Council in 1932 (serving until 1935) and 1945 (retiring the following year). At the 1950 general election he fought Northwich as the Labour candidate; in 1951 he fought Stretford and in 1955 he was the candidate in Oldham East.

He was reselected for Oldham East and won the seat in the 1959 general election, against the national tide because of depression in the local textiles industry. This was the only seat in England which went from Conservative to Labour at that election. Mapp was re-elected at the 1964 and 1966 elections. He retired at the 1970 general election.

Mapp also worked as a juvenile court magistrate.

Parliament of the United Kingdom
| Preceded by Sir Ian Horobin | Member of Parliament for Oldham East; 1959–1970 | Succeeded by James Lamond |
