= Chamber of Trade =

A Chamber of Trade may be a:

- Chamber of Commerce, representing the interests of industry
- Trade association, representing the interests of tradespeople
- Guild, historically representing a trade
- Livery company, historically representing a trade

== See also ==
- fr:Chambre de métiers et de l’artisanat (CMA), the French chamber of trades
