= Cornbrook railway station =

Former railway station in England

Cornbrook

General information
- Location: Old Trafford, Trafford; England
- Coordinates: 53.4693°N 2.2686°W
- Platforms: 2

Other information
- Status: Disused

History
- Original company: Manchester, South Junction and Altrincham Railway

Key dates
- 12 May 1856: Opened
- 1 June 1865: Closed
Location

Cornbrook railway station was opened on the south side of Cornbrook Road in the St. George's area of Manchester on 12 May 1856 by the Manchester South Junction and Altrincham Railway (MSJAR) to serve the nearby Pomona Gardens; there were four trains daily in each direction. It closed on 1 June 1865, the last trains having called on 31 May 1865.

Preceding station	Disused railways	Following station
Old Trafford; Line and station open	Manchester, South Junction and Altrincham Railway	Knott Mill and Deansgate; Line open, station open
