= Longford, Greater Manchester =

Electoral ward of Trafford, Greater Manchester, England

Longford
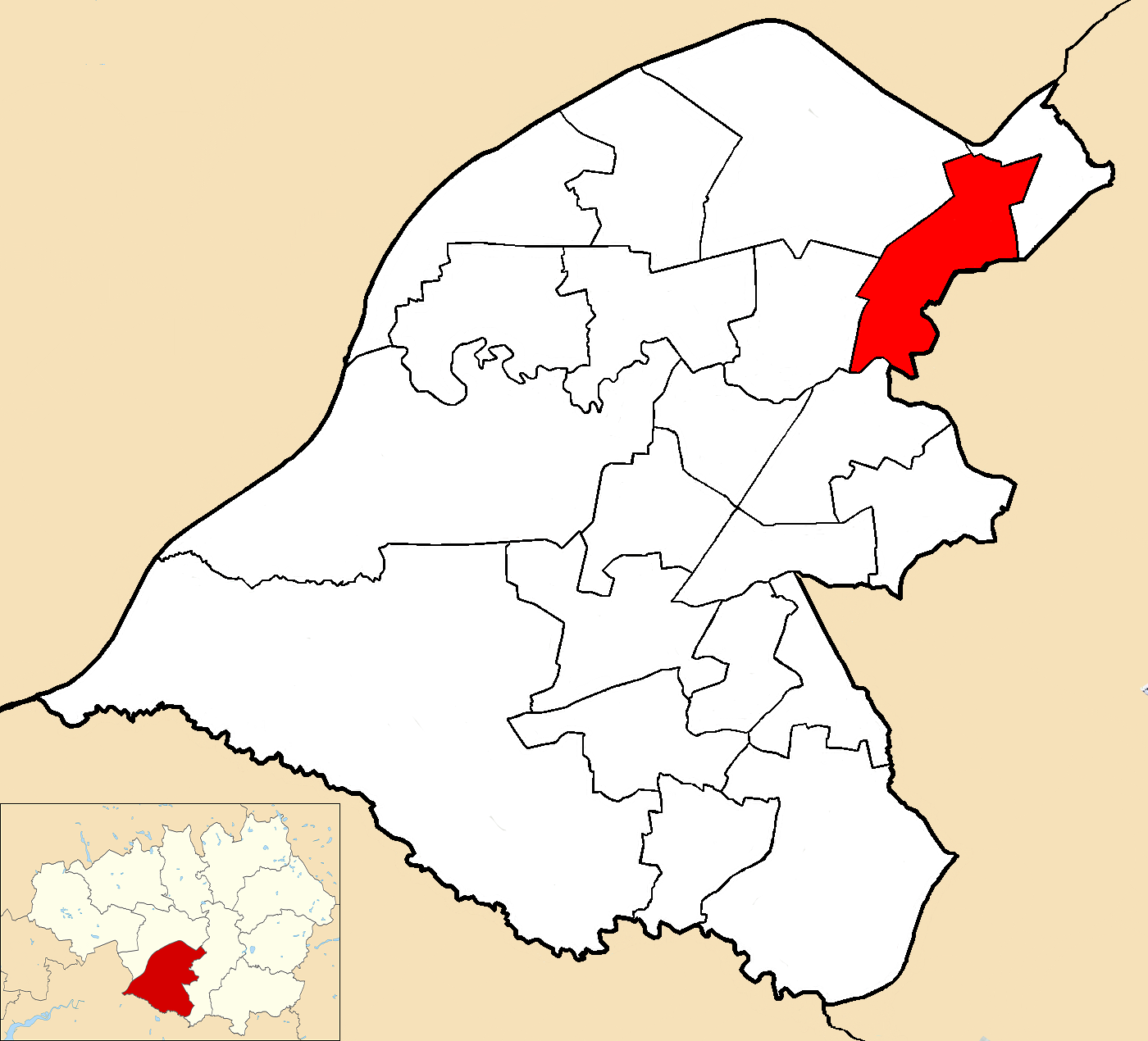
- Longford within Trafford
- Population: 12,163
- Metropolitan borough: Trafford
- Metropolitan county: Greater Manchester
- Country: England
- Sovereign state: United Kingdom
- UK Parliament: Stretford and Urmston
- Councillors: David Jarman (Labour); Judith Lloyd (Labour); Sarah Haughey (Labour)

Longford is an electoral ward of Trafford, Greater Manchester, covering the Firswood area of Stretford and a small part of the Old Trafford area. It is bordered by the Clifford ward to the northeast, the Gorse Hill ward to the northwest, the Stretford ward to the southwest and Priory to the south.

== Councillors ==
As of 2021, the councillors are David Jarman (Labour), Judith Lloyd (Labour), and Sarah Haughey (Labour).

Election	Councillor	Councillor	Councillor
1973	David Homer (Con)	Olive Chandler (Con)	Alex Kelly (Con)
1975	David Homer (Con)	Olive Chandler (Con)	Alex Kelly (Con)
1976	David Homer (Con)	Olive Chandler (Con)	Alex Kelly (Con)
1978	David Homer (Con)	Olive Chandler (Con)	Alex Kelly (Con)
1979	David Homer (Con)	Olive Chandler (Con)	Alex Kelly (Con)
Aug 1979	David Homer (Con)	Maureen Cottam (Lab)	Alex Kelly (Con)
1980	David Homer (Con)	Maureen Cottam (Lab)	Alex Kelly (Con)
1982	Keith Summerfield (Con)	Maureen Cottam (Lab)	Alex Kelly (Con)
1983	Keith Summerfield (Con)	Maureen Cottam (Lab)	Alex Kelly (Con)
1984	Keith Summerfield (Con)	Maureen Cottam (Lab)	Alex Kelly (Con)
1986	John Hagan (Lab)	Maureen Cottam (Lab)	Philip Morgan (Lab)
1987	John Hagan (Lab)	Maureen Cottam (Lab)	Keith Summerfield (Con)
1988	John Hagan (Lab)	Mary Ryan (Lab)	Keith Summerfield (Con)
1990	John Hagan (Lab)	Mary Ryan (Lab)	Keith Summerfield (Con)
1991	John Hagan (Lab)	Mary Ryan (Lab)	David Jarman (Lab)
1992	John Hagan (Lab)	Keith Summerfield (Con)	David Jarman (Lab)
1994	John Hagan (Lab)	Keith Summerfield (Con)	David Jarman (Lab)
1995	John Hagan (Lab)	Keith Summerfield (Con)	David Jarman (Lab)
1996	John Hagan (Lab)	Tim Faltermeyer (Lab)	David Jarman (Lab)
1998	Judith Lloyd (Lab)	Tim Faltermeyer (Lab)	David Jarman (Lab)
1999	Judith Lloyd (Lab)	Tim Faltermeyer (Lab)	David Jarman (Lab)
2000	Judith Lloyd (Lab)	Margaret Barker (Lab)	David Jarman (Lab)
2002	Judith Lloyd (Lab)	Margaret Barker (Lab)	David Jarman (Lab)
2003	Judith Lloyd (Lab)	Margaret Barker (Lab)	David Jarman (Lab)
2004	Judith Lloyd (Lab)	Pauleen Lane (Lab)	David Jarman (Lab)
2006	Judith Lloyd (Lab)	Pauleen Lane (Lab)	David Jarman (Lab)
2007	Judith Lloyd (Lab)	Pauleen Lane (Lab)	David Jarman (Lab)
2008	Judith Lloyd (Lab)	Pauleen Lane (Lab)	David Jarman (Lab)
2010	Judith Lloyd (Lab)	Pauleen Lane (Lab)	David Jarman (Lab)
2011	Judith Lloyd (Lab)	Anne Duffield (Lab)	David Jarman (Lab)
2012	Judith Lloyd (Lab)	Anne Duffield (Lab)	David Jarman (Lab)
2014	Judith Lloyd (Lab)	Anne Duffield (Lab)	David Jarman (Lab)
2015	Judith Lloyd (Lab)	Anne Duffield (Lab)	David Jarman (Lab)
2016	Judith Lloyd (Lab)	Anne Duffield (Lab)	David Jarman (Lab)
2018	Judith Lloyd (Lab)	Anne Duffield (Lab)	David Jarman (Lab)
2019	Judith Lloyd (Lab)	Anne Duffield (Lab)	David Jarman (Lab)
2020	Judith Lloyd (Lab)	Vacant	David Jarman (Lab)
2021	Sarah Haughey (Lab)	Judith Lloyd (Lab)	David Jarman (Lab)
2022	Sarah Haughey (Lab)	Judith Lloyd (Lab)	David Jarman (Lab)
2023	Sarah Haughey (Lab)	Judith Lloyd (Lab)	David Jarman (Lab)
2024	Sarah Haughey (Lab)	Judith Lloyd (Lab)	David Jarman (Lab)
2026	Sarah Haughey (Lab)	Gareth Twose (Green)	David Jarman (Lab)

indicates seat up for re-election. indicates seat up for election following resignation of sitting councillor.

== Elections in the 2020s ==
=== May 2026 ===
2026
Party	Candidate	Votes	%	±%
Green	Gareth Twose	1,719	46.6	+24.6
Labour	Judith Lloyd*	1,196	32.4	−24.7
Reform	Charles Rear	399	10.8	N/A
Conservative	Christopher Boyes	242	6.6	−3.2
Liberal Democrats	Anna Fryer	127	3.4	−3.9
Majority		523	14.2	
Rejected ballots		7	0.2	-0.7
Turnout		3,690	44.9	+7.9
Green gain from Labour		Swing	+24.7	

=== May 2024 ===
2024
Party	Candidate	Votes	%	±%
Labour	David Jarman*	1,678	57.1	−4.8
Green	Margaret Westbrook	645	22.0	+4.6
Conservative	Colin Hooley	288	9.8	−1.5
Liberal Democrats	Anna Fryer	214	7.3	+1.3
TUSC	Samuel Hogan-Webb	88	3.0	N/A
Majority		1,033	35.1	−9.4
Rejected ballots		25	0.9	-0.7
Turnout		2,938	37.0	+0.9
Registered electors		7,941		
Labour hold		Swing	-8.9	

=== May 2023 ===
2023 (3)
Party	Candidate	Votes	%	±%
Labour	Sarah Haughey*	1,971	70.3%	
Labour	Judith Lloyd*	1,768	63.1%	
Labour	David Jarman*	1,734	61.9%	
Green	Margaret Westbrook	488	17.4%	
Green	Matthew Kaufman	337	12.0%	
Green	Sanjal Patel	322	11.5%	
Conservative	David Booth	317	11.3%	
Conservative	Sandhya Paul	258	9.2%	
Conservative	Limna Lijo	252	9.0%	
Liberal Democrats	Dawn Carberry-Power	169	6.0%	
Majority				
Rejected ballots		45	1.6%	
Turnout		2,802	36.1%	
Registered electors		7,755		

=== May 2022 ===
2022
Party	Candidate	Votes	%	±%
Labour	David Jarman*	2,338	67.4	
Conservative	Daniel May	451	13.0	
Green	Margaret Westbrook	444	12.8	
Liberal Democrats	Anna Fryer	224	6.5	
Majority		1,887	54.4	
Registered electors		9,466		
Turnout		3,470	36.7	
Labour hold		Swing		

=== May 2021 ===
2021
Party	Candidate	Votes	%	±%
Labour	Sarah Haughey	2,470	63.1	N/A
Labour	Judith Lloyd	2,072	53.0	N/A
Green	Jennie Wadsworth	517	13.2	N/A
Green	Margaret Westbrook	435	11.1	N/A
Conservative	Lijo John	433	11.1	N/A
Conservative	Daniel May	409	10.5	N/A
Liberal Democrats	Anna Fryer	387	9.9	N/A
Liberal Democrats	Mark Campion	210	5.4	N/A
Majority		N/A		
Rejected ballots		15		
Registered electors		9,472		
Turnout		3,912	41.3	N/A
Labour hold		Swing	N/A	
Labour hold		Swing	N/A	

== Elections in the 2010s ==
=== May 2019 ===
2019
Party	Candidate	Votes	%	±%
Labour	Anne Duffield*	2,150	66.9	▼4.6
Green	Margaret Westbrook	406	12.6	▲6.1
Conservative	Adam Miya	336	10.46	▼4.5
Liberal Democrats	Anna Fryer	318	9.9	▲6.9
Majority		1,744	54.3	▼2.2
Registered electors		9,098		
Turnout		3,210	35.63	▼4.47
Labour hold		Swing		

=== May 2018 ===
2018
Party	Candidate	Votes	%	±%
Labour	David Jarman*	2,611	71.5	+3.6
Conservative	Cathy Conchie	547	15.0	+0.7
Green	Margaret Westbrook	238	6.5	−2.7
Liberal Democrats	Anna Fryer	194	5.3	+3.0
UKIP	Pauline Royle	60	1.6	−4.7
Majority		2,064	56.5	
Turnout		3,650	40.1	0
Labour hold		Swing		

=== May 2016 ===
2016
Party	Candidate	Votes	%	±%
Labour	Judith Lloyd*	2,311	67.9	+3.1
Conservative	Catherine Conchie	487	14.3	−6.6
Green	Margaret Westbrook	314	9.2	−5.1
UKIP	Valerie Bayley-Sanderson	214	6.3	+6.3
Liberal Democrats	Christopher Lovell	78	2.3	−4.0
Majority		1,824	53.6	+9.7
Turnout		3,404	40.1	−26.7
Labour hold		Swing		

=== May 2015 ===
2015
Party	Candidate	Votes	%	±%
Labour	Anne Duffield*	3,763	64.8	+1.8
Conservative	Edward Kelson	1,212	20.9	−0.2
Green	Margaret Westbrook	831	14.3	+3.1
Majority		2,551	43.9	+2.0
Turnout		5,806	66.8	+26.9
Labour hold		Swing		

=== May 2014 ===
2014
Party	Candidate	Votes	%	±%
Labour	David Jarman*	2,003	60.8	−4.5
Conservative	James Heywood	603	18.3	−0.1
Green	Margaret Westbrook	553	16.8	+3.8
Liberal Democrats	Dawn Carberry-Power	135	4.1	+0.8
Majority		1,400	42.5	−4.3
Turnout		3294	37.9	+2.9
Labour hold		Swing		

=== May 2012 ===
2012
Party	Candidate	Votes	%	±%
Labour	Judith Lloyd*	1,885	65.3	+2.3
Conservative	Alex Finney	532	18.4	−2.7
Green	Margaret Westbrook	375	13.0	+1.8
Liberal Democrats	Barbara Doyle	9.6	3.3	−1.4
Majority		1,353	46.8	+4.9
Turnout		2,888	35.0	−4.9
Labour hold		Swing		

=== May 2011 ===
2011
Party	Candidate	Votes	%	±%
Labour	Anne Duffield	2,194	63.0	+9.5
Conservative	Paul Lally	734	21.1	−0.6
Green	Margaret Westbrook	389	11.2	+2.7
Liberal Democrats	Dawn Carberry-Power	164	4.7	−11.5
Majority		1,460	41.9	+10.1
Turnout		3,481	39.9	−22.6
Labour hold		Swing		

=== May 2010 ===
2010
Party	Candidate	Votes	%	±%
Labour	David Jarman*	2,908	53.5	+12.2
Conservative	Paul Lally	1,181	21.7	−11.2
Liberal Democrats	David Rhodes	881	16.2	+6.2
Green	Margaret Westbrook	463	8.5	−7.3
Majority		1,727	31.8	+23.5
Turnout		5,433	62.5	+30.0
Labour hold		Swing		

== Elections in the 2000s ==
=== May 2008 ===
2008
Party	Candidate	Votes	%	±%
Labour	Judith Lloyd*	1,167	41.3	−4.2
Conservative	Rod Allan	931	32.9	+2.8
Green	Margaret Westbrook	448	15.8	+2.4
Liberal Democrats	David Rhodes	282	10.0	−1.0
Majority		236	8.3	−7.1
Turnout		2,828	32.5	−2.6
Labour hold		Swing		

=== May 2007 ===
2007
Party	Candidate	Votes	%	±%
Labour	Pauleen Lane*	1,313	45.5	−2.5
Conservative	Roderick Allan	868	30.1	−2.1
Green	Bernard Kelly	388	13.4	−0.9
Liberal Democrats	Simon Wright	317	11.0	+11.0
Majority		445	15.4	−0.4
Turnout		2,886	35.1	+1.5
Labour hold		Swing		

=== May 2006 ===
2006
Party	Candidate	Votes	%	±%
Labour	David Jarman*	1,299	48.0	+6.2
Conservative	Roderick Allan	870	32.2	+3.9
Green	Matthew Westbrook	388	14.3	+3.8
UKIP	Michael McManus	148	5.5	+5.5
Majority		429	15.8	+3.2
Turnout		2,705	33.6	−6.5
Labour hold		Swing		

=== May 2004 ===
2004 (after boundary changes)
Party	Candidate	Votes	%	±%
Labour	Judith Lloyd*	1,379	14.6	
Labour	Pauleen Lane*	1,288	13.6	
Labour	David Jarman*	1,286	13.6	
Conservative	Roderick Allan	948	10.0	
Conservative	Edward Kelson	889	9.4	
Conservative	Geoffrey Harding	846	8.9	
Liberal Democrats	Waseem Akram	654	6.9	
Liberal Democrats	Francis Beswick	591	6.2	
Liberal Democrats	Eric Haughton	576	6.1	
Green	Anne Power	362	3.8	
Green	Bernard Kelly	354	3.7	
Green	Stephen Parker	287	3.0	
Turnout		9,460	40.1	
Labour win (new seat)				
Labour win (new seat)				
Labour win (new seat)				

=== May 2003 ===
2003
Party	Candidate	Votes	%	±%
Labour	David Jarman*	1,708	49.7	−12.6
Conservative	Geoffrey Harding	1,233	35.9	−1.8
Green	Bernard Kelly	497	14.5	+14.5
Majority		475	13.8	−10.8
Turnout		3,438	48.4	−0.1
Labour hold		Swing		

=== May 2002 ===
2002
Party	Candidate	Votes	%	±%
Labour	Judith Lloyd*	2,174	62.3	+7.8
Conservative	John Schofield	1,318	37.7	−7.8
Majority		856	24.6	+15.6
Turnout		3,492	48.5	+13.9
Labour hold		Swing		

=== May 2000 ===
2000
Party	Candidate	Votes	%	±%
Labour	Margaret Barker	1,393	54.5	+0.8
Conservative	Keith Summerfield	1,164	45.5	+5.3
Majority		229	9.0	−4.5
Turnout		2,557	34.6	+3.9
Labour hold		Swing		

== Elections in the 1990s ==
1999
Party	Candidate	Votes	%	±%
Labour	Jarman*	1,215	53.7	−10.6
Conservative	Kelson	910	40.2	+4.5
Liberal Democrats	Browne	137	6.1	+6.1
Majority		305	13.5	−15.1
Turnout		2,262	30.7	−2.3
Labour hold		Swing		

1998
Party	Candidate	Votes	%	±%
Labour	J. A. Lloyd	1,576	64.3	+5.2
Conservative	A. Kelly	875	35.7	−5.2
Majority		701	28.6	+10.4
Turnout		2,451	33.0	−2.4
Labour hold		Swing		

1996
Party	Candidate	Votes	%	±%
Labour	T. S. Faltermeyer	1,544	59.1	−2.0
Conservative	K. G. Summerfield*	1,068	40.9	+2.0
Majority		476	18.2	−3.9
Turnout		2,612	35.4	−3.7
Labour gain from Conservative		Swing		

1995
Party	Candidate	Votes	%	±%
Labour	D. P. Jarman*	1,760	61.1	+5.0
Conservative	J. G. Graham	1,122	38.9	−3.0
Majority		638	22.1	+1.8
Turnout		2,882	39.1	−3.8
Labour hold		Swing		

1994
Party	Candidate	Votes	%	±%
Labour	J. P. Hagan*	1,779	56.1	+12.7
Conservative	E. J. Kelson	1,137	35.9	−17.7
Liberal Democrats	C. R. Walmsley	253	8.0	+8.0
Majority		642	20.3	+10.2
Turnout		3,169	42.9	+2.0
Labour hold		Swing		

1992
Party	Candidate	Votes	%	±%
Conservative	K. G. Summerfield	1,615	53.6	+4.8
Labour	K. Birchenough	1,309	43.4	−7.8
Green	D. Glazier	91	3.0	+3.0
Majority		306	10.1	+7.7
Turnout		3,015	40.9	−4.7
Conservative gain from Labour		Swing		

1991
Party	Candidate	Votes	%	±%
Labour	D. P. Jarman	1,750	51.2	−3.3
Conservative	K. G. Summerfield*	1,669	48.8	+9.9
Majority		81	2.4	−13.3
Turnout		3,419	45.6	−3.2
Labour gain from Conservative		Swing		

1990
Party	Candidate	Votes	%	±%
Labour	J. P. Hagan*	2,015	54.5	−0.2
Conservative	S. M. Dirikis	1,436	38.9	−6.4
Green	J. D. Westbrook	245	6.6	+6.6
Majority		579	15.7	+6.4
Turnout		3,696	48.8	+1.4
Labour hold		Swing		

== Elections in the 1980s ==
1988
Party	Candidate	Votes	%	±%
Labour	M. B. Ryan	1,934	54.7	+11.7
Conservative	S. M. Dirikis	1,604	45.3	−0.5
Majority		330	9.3	+6.5
Turnout		3,538	47.4	−5.3
Labour hold		Swing		

1987
Party	Candidate	Votes	%	±%
Conservative	K. G. Summerfield	1,841	45.8	+6.1
Labour	P. J. Morgan*	1,730	43.0	−11.4
SDP	M. L. Kugler	450	11.2	+6.3
Majority		111	2.8	−3.8
Turnout		4,021	52.7	+7.0
Conservative gain from Labour		Swing		

1986
Party	Candidate	Votes	%	±%
Labour	J. P. Hagan	1,824	28.6	+2.9
Labour	P. J. Morgan	1,711	26.8	−0.7
Conservative	K. G. Summerfield*	1,292	20.3	−5.1
Conservative	E. J. Kelson	1,235	19.4	−6.9
SDP	M. L. Kugler	313	4.9	+4.9
Majority		419	6.6	−2.0
Turnout		6,375	45.7	+1.4
Labour gain from Conservative		Swing		
Labour gain from Conservative		Swing		

1984
Party	Candidate	Votes	%	±%
Labour	M. E. Cottam*	1,848	54.3	+9.9
Conservative	I. B. Simmonds	1,556	45.7	−0.2
Majority		292	8.6	+7.1
Turnout		3,404	44.3	−4.8
Labour hold		Swing		

1983
Party	Candidate	Votes	%	±%
Conservative	A. Kelly*	1,724	45.9	+0.5
Labour	K. Silcock	1,666	44.4	+3.2
Alliance	M. L. Kugler	363	9.7	−3.7
Majority		58	1.5	−2.7
Turnout		3,753	49.1	+2.9
Conservative hold		Swing		

1982
Party	Candidate	Votes	%	±%
Conservative	K. G. Summerfield	1,638	45.4	+8.1
Labour	K. Silcock	1,488	41.2	−21.5
Liberal	W. A. Munden	483	13.4	+13.4
Majority		150	4.2	−21.2
Turnout		3,609	46.2	−0.7
Conservative hold		Swing		

1980
Party	Candidate	Votes	%	±%
Labour	M. E. Cottam*	2,252	62.7	+21.6
Conservative	J. A. Schofield	1,341	37.3	−7.2
Majority		911	25.4	+22.0
Turnout		3,593	46.9	−25.8
Labour hold		Swing		

== Elections in the 1970s ==
By-Election 30 August 1979
Party	Candidate	Votes	%	±%
Labour	M. E. Cottam	1,187	42.7	+1.6
Conservative	J. A. Schofield	1,127	40.5	−4.0
Liberal	H. D. Locksley	466	16.8	+2.4
Majority		60	2.2	−1.2
Turnout		2,780	29.1	−43.6
Labour gain from Conservative		Swing		

1979
Party	Candidate	Votes	%	±%
Conservative	A. Kelly*	3,091	44.5	−9.2
Labour	M. E. Cottam	2,852	41.1	+4.6
Liberal	H. D. Locksley	1,002	14.4	+4.6
Majority		239	3.4	−13.7
Turnout		6,945	72.7	+38.3
Conservative hold		Swing		

1978
Party	Candidate	Votes	%	±%
Conservative	D. W. Homer*	1,886	53.7	+0.2
Labour	A. J. Lloyd	1,284	36.5	+1.8
Liberal	H. D. Locksley	343	9.8	−1.9
Majority		602	17.1	−1.7
Turnout		3,513	34.4	−4.6
Conservative hold		Swing		

1976
Party	Candidate	Votes	%	±%
Conservative	O. Chandler*	2,033	53.5	+0.3
Labour	A. J. Lloyd	1,319	34.7	+4.0
Liberal	H. D. Locksley	446	11.7	−4.4
Majority		714	18.8	−3.7
Turnout		3,798	39.0	+3.4
Conservative hold		Swing		

1975
Party	Candidate	Votes	%	±%
Conservative	A. Kelly*	1,844	53.2	
Labour	K. Silcock	1,064	30.7	
Liberal	J. Stockley	557	16.1	
Majority		780	22.5	
Turnout		3,465	35.6	
Conservative hold		Swing		

1973
Party	Candidate	Votes	%	±%
Conservative	D. W. Homer	1,859	52.5	
Conservative	O. Chandler	1,811		
Conservative	A. Kelly	1,711		
Labour	J. Bailey	1,683	47.5	
Labour	H. Pyper	1,655		
Labour	K. Silcock	1,606		
Majority		28		
Turnout		3,542	35.4	
Conservative win (new seat)				
Conservative win (new seat)				
Conservative win (new seat)				
