= Cornbrook station =

Cornbrook station may refer to:

- Cornbrook Metrolink station, open station on Manchester's Metrolink system
- Cornbrook railway station, disused station in Manchester
