= Old Trafford tram stop =

Manchester Metrolink tram stop

Old Trafford
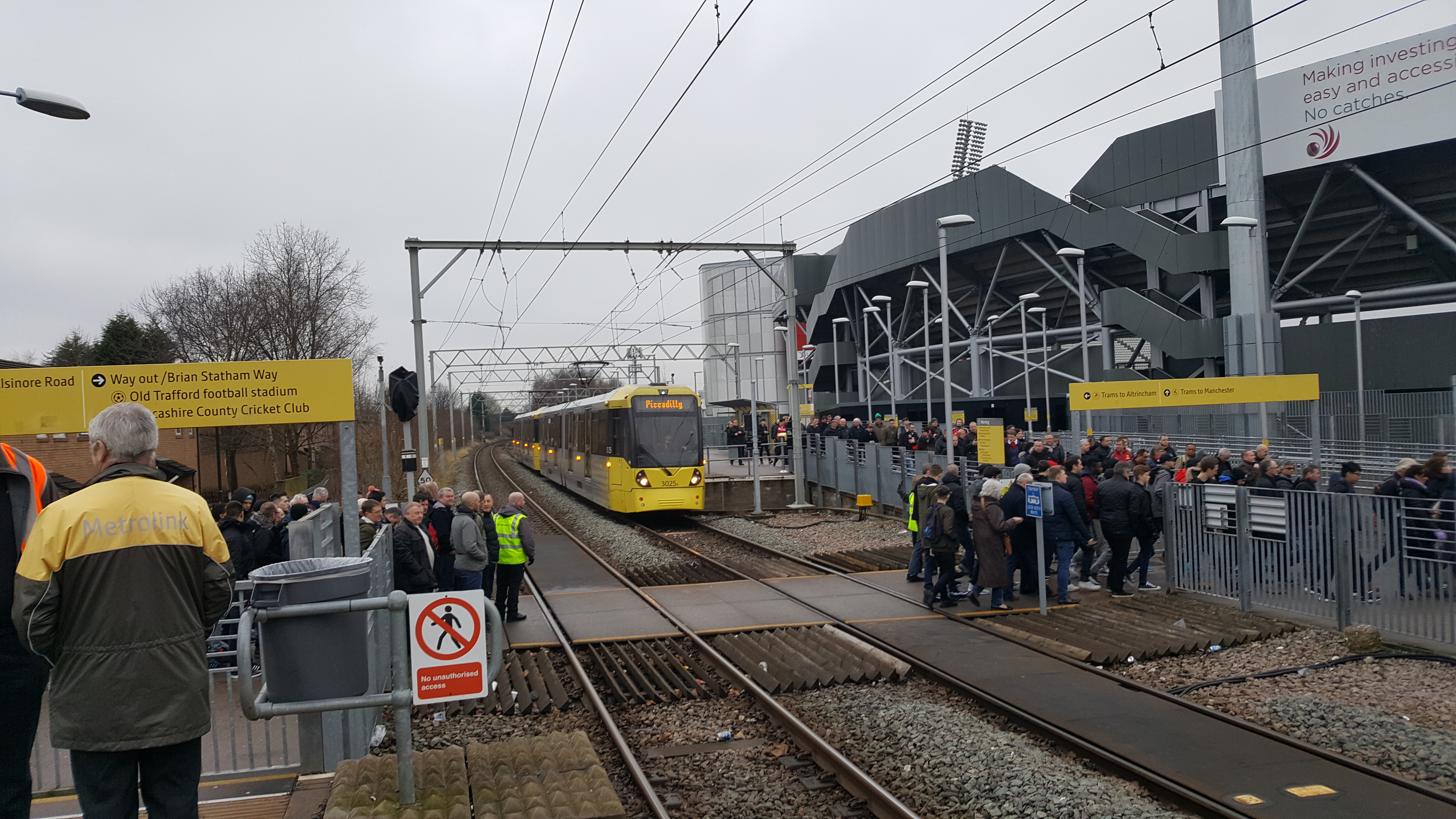
- A M5000 breaks the stream of football fans at Old Trafford tram stop. Jan 2017.

General information
- Location: Old Trafford, Trafford; England
- Coordinates: 53.45605°N 2.28504°W
- Grid reference: SJ812956
- System: Metrolink station
- Line: Altrincham Line
- Platforms: 2

Other information
- Status: In operation
- Fare zone: 2

History
- Opened: 5 May 1857
- Former names: 1862: Cricket Ground; 1887: Cricket Ground (Old Trafford); 1910: Cricket and Football Grounds; 1931: Warwick Road or Warwick Road (Old Trafford)
- Original company: MSJAR
- Pre-grouping: MSJAR
- Post-grouping: MSJAR; London Midland Region of British Railways

Key dates
- 24 December 1991: Closed as a rail station
- 15 June 1992: Conversion to Metrolink operation
Route map
Location

Old Trafford is a tram stop on the Altrincham Line of the Metrolink light rail system in Old Trafford, Greater Manchester, England.

Before 1991, it was a railway station called Warwick Road; it reopened as a tram stop on 15 June 1992 with its current name. The stop is regularly used by crowds going to Old Trafford Football Ground and Old Trafford Cricket Ground which are both nearby. The stop was rebuilt in 2009 in order to better handle large crowds.

== History ==
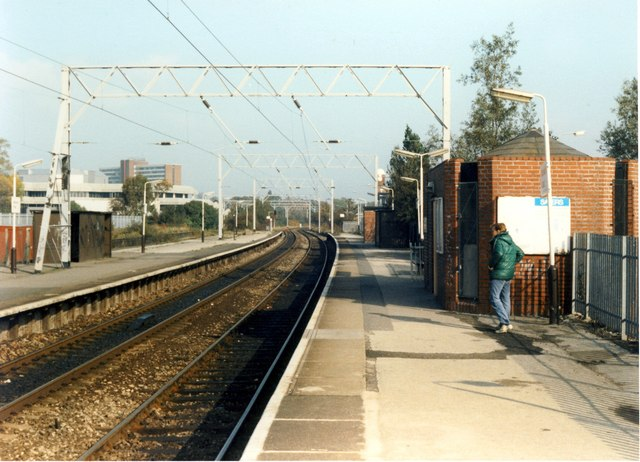
Old Trafford station (then named Warwick Road) in 1988, prior to conversion to Metrolink

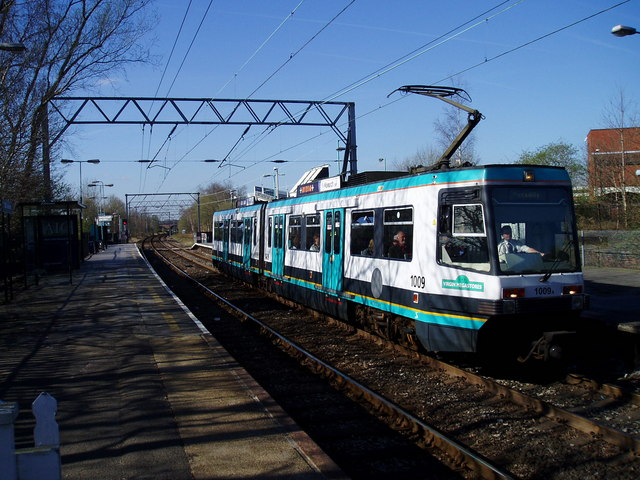
A T-68 leaving Old Trafford in 2007 prior to the rebuild; the Old Trafford Cricket Ground scoreboard can be seen behind the vehicle.

A station, just to the north of the present station, was opened by the Manchester, South Junction and Altrincham Railway (MSJAR) in May 1857 as Manchester Art Treasures Exhibition, being built to serve the exhibition of that name, which was open between 5 May 1857 and 17 October 1857. The station closed in October 1857. It was adapted and reopened as Old Trafford Cricket Ground in 1862 for use every year thereafter until 1866, on match days only.

The station opened for special events, such as the Royal Agricultural Society Exhibition in 1869, and again between May and October 1887 for the Royal Jubilee Exhibition in Stretford Royal Botanical Gardens, held to celebrate the Golden Jubilee of Queen Victoria, during both of which the station was known as Exhibition; additional platforms were constructed for the latter. From 1887 until 1963 it operated as a four-platform station. It was renamed Cricket Ground (Old Trafford) and continued to open on match days only; in 1910 it became Cricket and Football Grounds following the opening of Manchester United's ground on 19 February 1910.

On 11 May 1931, following the electrification of the MSJAR, the station was renamed Warwick Road and was open daily. It was also referred to as Warwick Road (Old Trafford) on early tickets, timetables, etc. Warwick Road closed as a British Rail station on 25 December 1991 (the last trains having run on 24 December 1991) for conversion to light rail operation, and reopened as a Metrolink station on 15 June 1992, at which point it was renamed Old Trafford.

In 2009 the north-bound platform (to Manchester) was demolished and a new one was built further south. This was to allow the addition of a ground-level pedestrian crossing over the tracks, connecting the platforms. Trams on both lines will stop before reaching the crossing. The crossing is also suitable for wheelchairs, bicycles and horses. Previously there was an underground tunnel.

== Location and use ==
The station is adjacent to the Old Trafford Cricket Ground, the home of Lancashire County Cricket Club, and only a short walk from the Old Trafford football stadium, the home of Manchester United F.C. As a result, Old Trafford Station regularly faces heavy usage from the crowds attending cricket and football matches and concerts. Crowd control operations often involve the use of turnstiles. The football ground is also served by the much closer Wharfside tram stop on the Trafford Park Line, opposite the stadium.

An average of 2,000 passenger journeys are made per day to or from Old Trafford stop, but this can rise to 9,500 on a match day. In order to manage the crowds more effectively, the stop was rebuilt in 2009. The pedestrian underpass was closed and passengers instead cross the tram line to change platforms. The platforms themselves were rearranged into a staggered layout by moving the northbound platform (for trams into Manchester), and both platforms were doubled in length to 120 metres, to allow two double trams to stop at the same time. A new match day gating system was installed and the station was redecorated with the new yellow and silver Metrolink corporate identity.

Old Trafford Metrolink depot is next to the station on Elsinore Road and staff use the station regularly for access to it.

== Services ==
Old Trafford is on the Altrincham Line with trams towards Altrincham stopping every 6 minutes during the day, Monday to Saturday, every 12 minutes Monday to Saturday evenings and Sundays. Trams also head towards Manchester and Bury, with the Monday to Saturday daytime service running every 12 minutes each to Piccadilly or Bury, while evening and Sunday journeys run to Piccadilly only.

=== Service pattern ===
- 10 trams per hour to Altrincham (5 offpeak)
- 5 trams per hour to Bury (peak only)
- 5 trams per hour to Piccadilly

=== Ticket zones ===
As of January 2019, Old Trafford is located in Metrolink ticket zone 2.

== Connecting bus routes ==
Old Trafford station is only served by one service, Stagecoach Manchester service 253, which runs weekdays mornings to Piccadilly Gardens via the universities. A more frequent service is provided on Chester Road.

== Notes ==
Preceding station	Manchester Metrolink	Following station
Stretford towards Altrincham	Altrincham–Bury (peak only)	Trafford Bar towards Bury
Stretford towards Altrincham	Altrincham–Piccadilly	Trafford Bar towards Piccadilly
