= Trafford Bar tram stop =

Manchester Metrolink tram stop

Trafford Bar
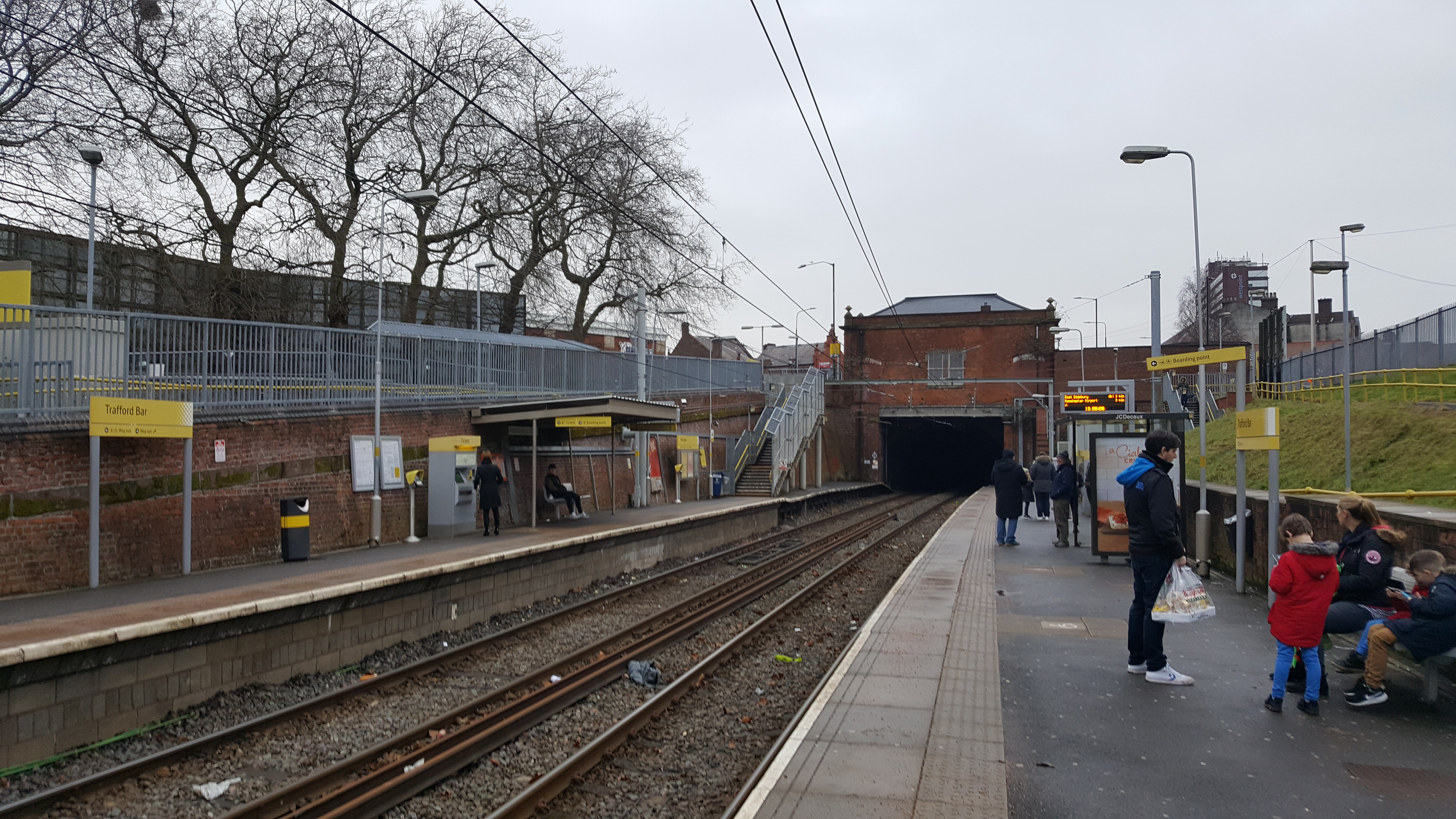

General information
- Location: Old Trafford, Trafford; England
- Coordinates: 53.46169°N 2.27740°W
- Grid reference: SJ816961
- System: Manchester Metrolink tram stop
- Operator: KeolisAmey Metrolink
- Line: Altrincham Line
- Platforms: 2

Construction
- Structure type: Embankment
- Accessible: Yes

Other information
- Status: In service
- Station code: TRA
- Fare zone: 2
- Website: Trafford Bar tram stop

History
- Opened: 15 June 1992; 34 years ago (Metrolink)
- Pre-grouping: Manchester South Junction and Altrincham Railway
- Post-grouping: British Rail (London Midland Region)

Key dates
- 20 July 1849: Opened as Old Trafford
- 25 December 1991: Closed for Metrolink conversion
- 15 June 1992: Reopened as Trafford Bar

Passengers
- 2019/20: ▲1.782 million
- 2020/21: ▼0.298 million
- 2021/22: ▲0.823 million
- 2022/23: ▲1.059 million
- 2023/24: ▲1.191 million
Route map
Location

Trafford Bar is a Manchester Metrolink tram stop in Old Trafford, Greater Manchester, at the road junction of Talbot Road and Seymour Grove. It is on the Altrincham Line and in fare Zone 2. This stop is near to White City Retail Park, Old Trafford Cricket Ground, and Old Trafford Football Ground (although Old Trafford and Wharfside are the nearest tram stops to the cricket and football stadiums respectively). This station was opened to Metrolink on 15 June 1992, after previously being a railway station.

== History ==
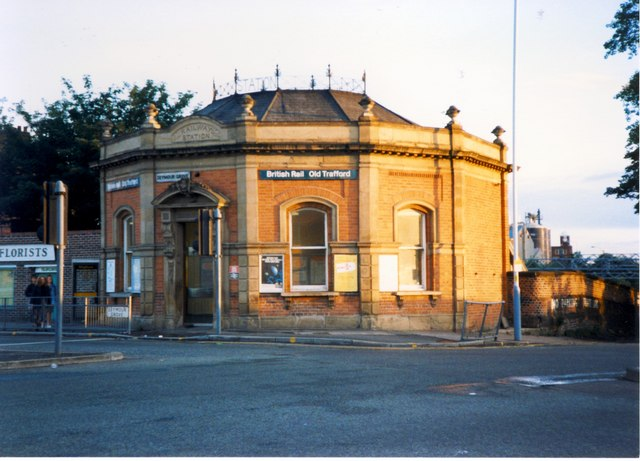
The station in 1983 (pre-Metrolink), displaying the Old Trafford name and British Rail branding.

The original mainline station was opened as Old Trafford on 20 July 1849 by the Manchester, South Junction and Altrincham Railway (MSJ&AR).

For conversion to Metrolink, the station and the line through to Altrincham closed after the last trains on 24 December 1991. To avoid confusion for passengers travelling to Old Trafford Football Ground and Old Trafford Cricket Ground, for the Metrolink, Warwick Road station (which was closer to the two grounds) was renamed "Old Trafford", and Old Trafford station was renamed to "Trafford Bar". They both reopened as Metrolink tram stops on 15 June 1992.

Though Trafford Bar is not the closest tram stop to the two grounds, it is frequently used during events or match-days by fans, as this station is connected to more lines and is easier to reach than Old Trafford and Wharfside, the nearest stops. Since the opening of the lines to East Didsbury and Manchester Airport, Trafford Bar has been used more at times like these.

== Layout ==
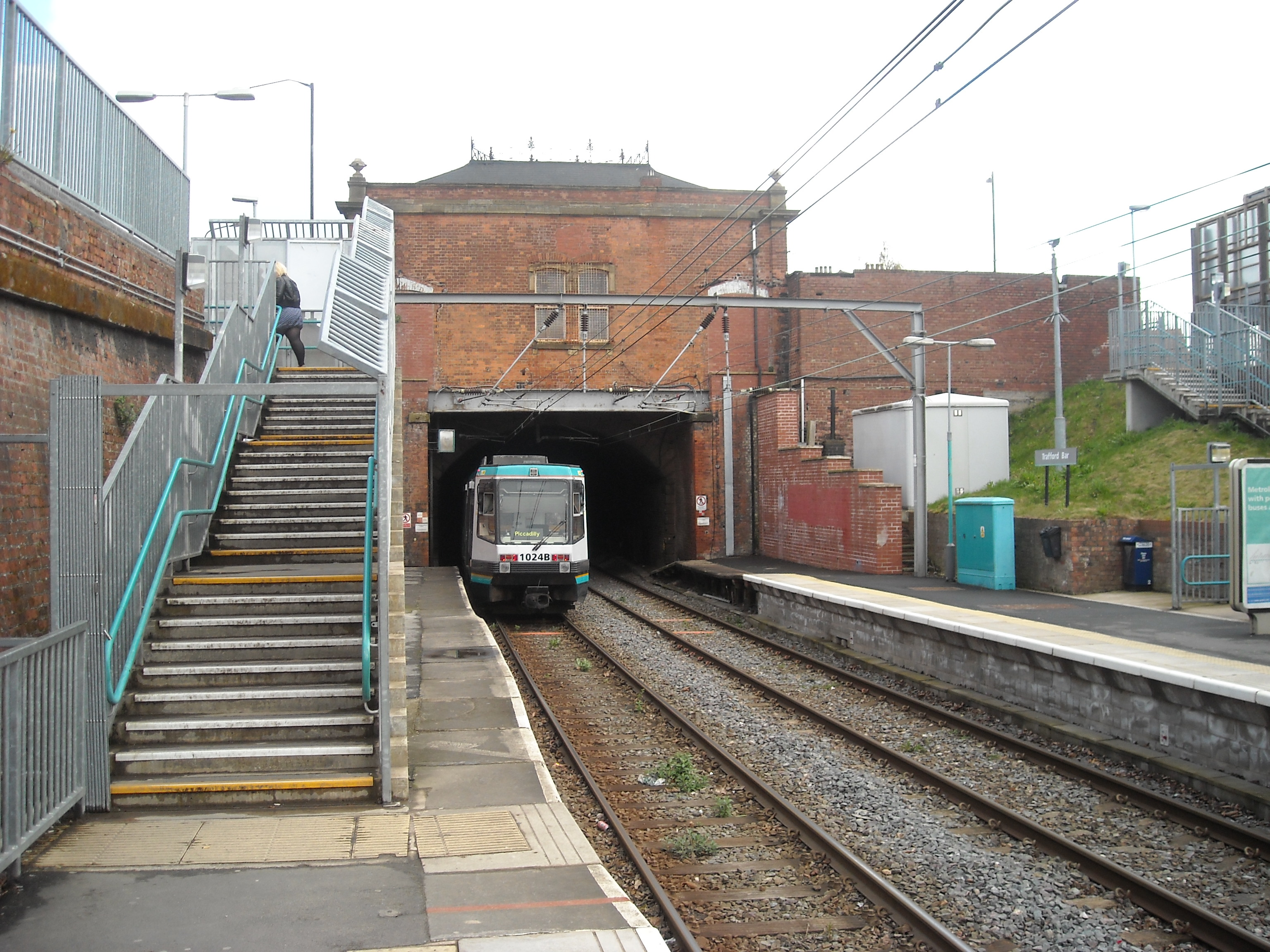
The station in 2009 (Metrolink) prior to refurbishment.

Trafford Bar tram stop today has steps and step-free access ramps down to both platforms. This station also provides interchange with the Altrincham and South Manchester lines, however, there is no track level crossing at the stop, meaning switching platforms requires passengers to exit the station and walk around, so it is recommended by the Metrolink to use Cornbrook instead.

Two dot matrix passenger information displays stand serving one platform each, and show estimated arrival times for trams in minutes up to 30 minutes prior (up to three at a time) and number of carriages.

== Services ==
Every route across the Manchester Metrolink network operates to a 12-minute headway (5 tph) Monday–Saturday, and to a 15-minute headway (4 tph) on Sundays and bank holidays. Sections served by a second "peak only" route will have a combined headway of 6 minutes during peak times, though headways don't combine for separate routes.

Trafford Bar is located in Zone 2, and the stop itself has two platforms which aren't named. Services that depart from the inbound platform (northernmost) are shown under "Following station" in the table below. Outbound platform (southernmost) departures are under "Preceding station".

Preceding station	Manchester Metrolink	Following station
Firswood towards East Didsbury	East Didsbury–Rochdale	Cornbrook towards Rochdale Town Centre
Firswood towards East Didsbury	East Didsbury–Shaw (peak only)	Cornbrook towards Shaw and Crompton
Firswood towards Manchester Airport	Manchester Airport–Victoria	Cornbrook towards Victoria
Old Trafford towards Altrincham	Altrincham–Bury (peak only)	Cornbrook towards Bury
Old Trafford towards Altrincham	Altrincham–Piccadilly	Cornbrook towards Piccadilly
Old Trafford towards Altrincham	Altrincham–Etihad Campus (evenings and Sundays only)	Cornbrook towards Etihad Campus

== Connecting bus routes ==
It is served nearby by Go North West service 53 to Pendleton via Salford Quays and to Cheetham Hill via the universities, Rusholme, Gorton and Harpurhey.

Stagecoach service 250 to Trafford Centre, Stagecoach service 255 to Partington via Stretford and Urmston, Stagecoach service 256 to Flixton via Stretford, Arriva service 263 to Altrincham Interchange via Stretford and Sale. All these services run to Piccadilly Gardens.

	Disused railways	
Cornbrook; 1856–65; Line and station closed	Manchester, South Junction and Altrincham Railway	Warwick Road for Old Trafford; Line and station open
Deansgate; 1849–56, 1865–1991; Line closed, station open	Manchester, South Junction and Altrincham Railway	Warwick Road for Old Trafford; Line and station open
