= Bowdon railway station =

Disused railway station in England

Coordinates: 53.38465°N 2.35243°W

Bowdon railway station served the district of Bowdon, Cheshire (now Greater Manchester), between 1849 and 1881.

The station was built by the Manchester, South Junction and Altrincham Railway (MSJ&AR), and opened on 22 September 1849, the same day that a short southerly extension to the MSJ&AR line to reach Bowdon was completed from the original Altrincham station of 20 July 1849.

Bowdon station was located on Lloyd Street/Railway Street in Altrincham, near to the boundary with Bowdon. A service of steam-hauled trains ran via Sale station to Manchester Oxford Road. The station served the locality until 3 April 1881, when both it and the first Altrincham station were closed, replaced by the new large facility named Altrincham and Bowdon, situated between the two former stations.

From 1931 the former Bowdon station site became the repair shop and depot for the electric trains of the newly electrified MSJ&AR. The depot closed in 1971, and the site was used for the next 30 years as a car park. The site was redeveloped in the early 21st century.

Preceding station	Disused railways	Following station
Terminus	Manchester, South Junction and Altrincham Railway	Altrincham; Line and station closed
