= Firswood =

Coordinates: 53.4525°N 2.2793°W

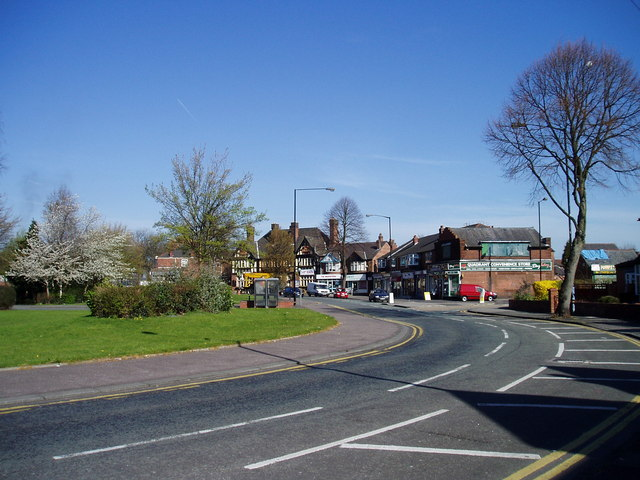
- The Quadrant

- Location within Greater Manchester
- OS grid reference: SJ814951
- Metropolitan borough: Trafford
- Metropolitan county: Greater Manchester
- Region: North West
- Country: England
- Sovereign state: United Kingdom
- Post town: MANCHESTER
- Postcode district: M16, M32
- Dialling code: 0161
- Police: Greater Manchester
- Fire: Greater Manchester
- Ambulance: North West
- UK Parliament: Stretford and Urmston

Firswood is a suburban area of Stretford in the Metropolitan Borough of Trafford, Greater Manchester, England.

== Geography ==
Firswood borders Chorlton-cum-Hardy, Old Trafford and Whalley Range. It was largely occupied by Rye Bank Farm, which remained until 1930, when private housing was built along Rye Bank Road and Warwick Road. Social Housing was built on part of Firs Farm after WW2. The remainder of Firs Farm was demolished in 1960, and St.Hilda's Junior School was built on the site. Before being drained, the area was largely a peat bog, which explains the lack of development before the 20th century.

The oldest residential part of the area is Darley Park, which shares some characteristics with neighbouring Whalley Range and Chorltonville.

St Teresa's church (1928) is a parish church in the Roman Catholic Diocese of Salford.

== Landmarks ==
=== The Quadrant ===
The Quadrant, where Kings Road meets Great Stone Road is the most recognisable place in the area. In the centre are public gardens and parking, Around this leafy green space is the Quadrant public house, a former public library now a Beacon Centre, and a number of shops, a barber and an established Holistic Therapy Centre .

== Transport ==
Firswood is served by the Manchester Metrolink light rail network. Firswood tram stop is on Rye Bank Road, where it opened in July 2011, after the existing disused Cheshire Lines Committee railway track was cleared and upgraded as part of Metrolink ‘Big Bang' extension.

The tram stop is served by two lines: Rochdale to East Didsbury, and Victoria to Manchester Airport. This means there are direct services from Firswood to Manchester city centre, Rochdale, Oldham, Chorlton, Didsbury, Wythenshawe and Manchester Airport.

The area is also served by the nearby Old Trafford tram stop, on the Altrincham to Bury line, and the number 15 bus.

== Public services ==
Stretford Memorial Hospital, originally known as Basford House, was converted into a cottage hospital as a memorial to those who lost their lives in the First World War. On opening it had a children's ward, a maternity unity and a geriatric ward. Until its closure in October 2015, it was managed by Central Manchester University Hospitals NHS Foundation Trust, and provided a range of services including geriatric medicine, ophthalmology and pain management.

== Notable residents ==
John Alcock, who along with Arthur Whitten Brown was the first man to fly across the Atlantic Ocean, was born in the lodge of Basford House on Seymour Grove, where his father was the coachman.

Edward Colquhoun Charlton lived at 12 Basford Road, prior to his conscription into the British Army. He was posthumously awarded the last Victoria Cross awarded in the European theatre of the Second World War. A road was subsequently named after him, on the nearby Firs Farm development.

Tom Curry member of the Manchester United coaching staff who died in the 1958 Munich Air Disaster lived on Bedford Road in Firswood.
