= British Rail Class 505 =

1931 class of electric multiple unit trains

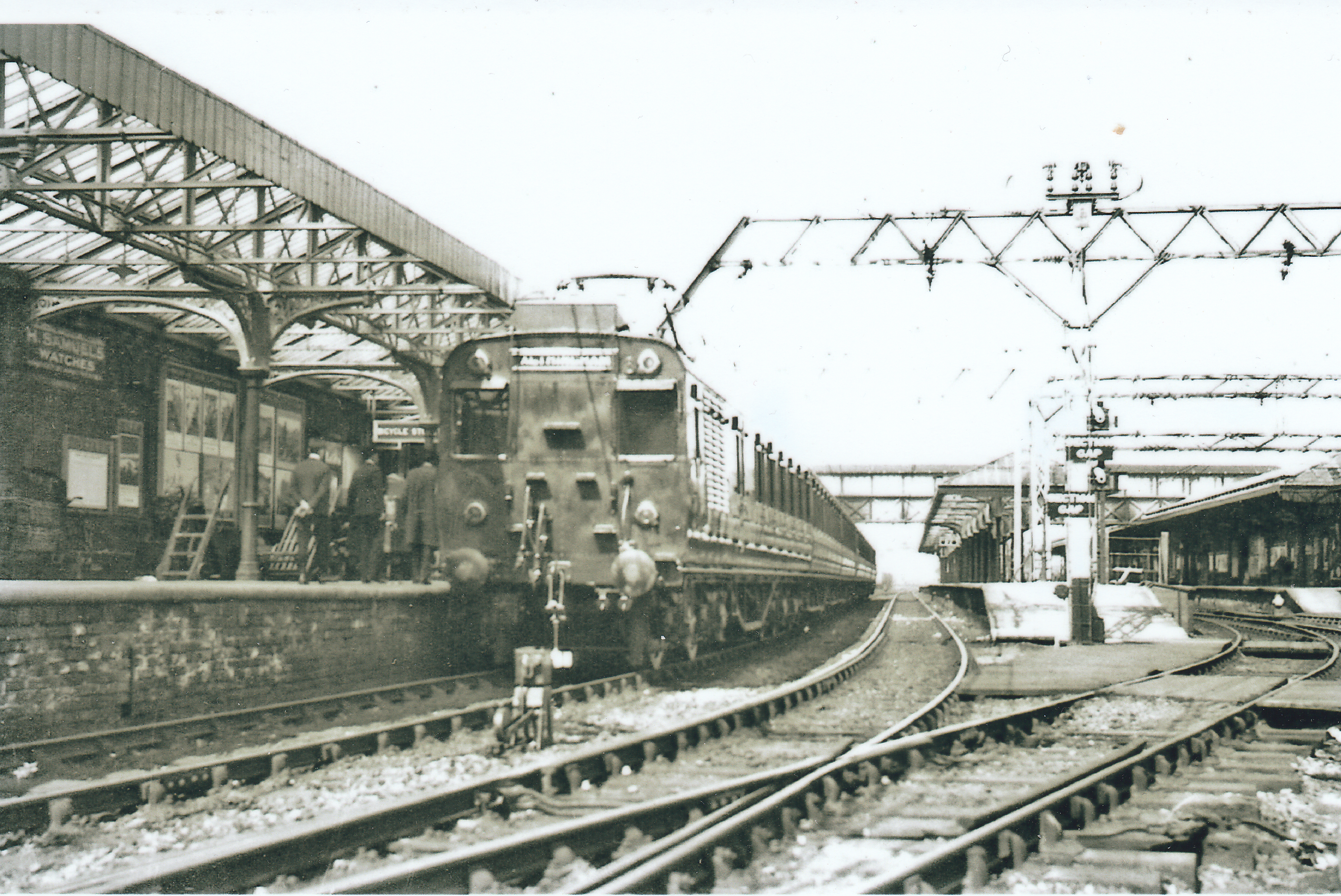
- A Class 505 at Altrincham
- In service: 1931-1971
- Manufacturer: Metropolitan Cammell
- Number built: 1931: 22 three-car sets + 2 spare power cars 1939: 8 additional trailers
- Formation: 3-car set or 6-car set or 7-car set
- Capacity: As built: First Class, 40 seats and Third Class, 228 seats Later: First Class, 24 seats and Third Class, 252 seats
- Operators: Manchester, South Junction and Altrincham Railway; British Railways

Specifications
- Electric system: 1,500 V DC overhead
- Current collection: Pantograph
- Track gauge: 1,435 mm (4 ft 8 1/2 in) standard gauge

British Railways Class 505 were 1,500 V DC electric multiple units (EMUs) introduced in 1931 by the Manchester, South Junction and Altrincham Railway (MSJAR). Although assigned to TOPS Class 505 by British Railways, these units were withdrawn before the TOPS numbering system came into common use for multiple units, and the Class 505 designation is very rarely used.

Following the 1923 Grouping, the MSJAR company was owned jointly by the LMS and LNER. It operated a 13.7 km (8 1/2 miles) route between Manchester London Road (now Manchester Piccadilly) and Altrincham in Cheshire. The MSJAR was electrified in the early 1930s on the 1,500 V DC overhead system.

== Overview ==
Twenty-two 3-car EMUs and two spare power cars were built for the new electric service, which started on 11 May 1931. It was common with the earlier generation electric trains for the power cars to require much more engineering workshop time than the trailers, and several systems had additional power cars built. These trains were based at Bowdon depot and ran exclusively between Manchester and Altrincham for forty years. In 1939, eight additional trailers were added, both new build and secondhand conversions, inserted into eight of the 3-car sets, and these allowed 7-car trains to be run on many peak hour services. The Altrincham electrics had substantial power installed and were well able to handle the extra car. As with other Manchester area suburban electric services, demand reduced notably from the 1950s onwards, and the 7-car trains were eliminated.

== Route shortened ==
The 1931 service ran from Altrincham, through Manchester Oxford Road, to Manchester London Road (nowadays Manchester Piccadilly). In 1961 it was decided to extend the 25 kV electrification project from Crewe to Manchester Piccadilly through to Oxford Road station, and thus the Altrincham electric trains had to be cut back to that point, where new terminal platforms for them were provided in a rebuilt station. The long term intention was to link the two routes as a through service, but this did not happen for another 10 years.

== Withdrawal and preservation ==
In April 1971, all the Class 505 Altrincham Electric units were withdrawn when the line was converted from 1,500 V DC to 25 kV 50 Hz AC. Two centre trailer cars, M29666 and M29670 (MSJAR 117 and 121), were purchased by the Altrincham Electric Railway Preservation Society and moved to the Yorkshire Dales Railway (now Embsay and Bolton Abbey Steam Railway). In 1983, they were moved to the Midland Railway Centre (now Midland Railway - Butterley) in Derbyshire where they are undergoing restoration. Here they joined centre trailer coach M29663 (MSJAR 114) which had been bought by Derby City Council. This coach was broken up in 2006. No driving coaches have been preserved.

== Description ==
The Altrincham Electrics were built with a wooden frame construction and individual compartments, with no corridors or gangways. They were coupled as 3-car sets and often operated in multiple as 6-car trains at rush hours. The units were built by Metropolitan Cammell to an LMS design and were a much more conservative style of train than the Southport and Wirral line EMUs which the LMS introduced just a few years later.

=== Formation ===
Each three-car Altrincham Electric comprised:-

- A motor coach, with driving cab, guard's compartment, electrical equipment and third class passenger compartments. This coach was powered by four 328 hp. GEC traction motors and also carried the unit's pantograph.
- A centre trailer coach, with no driving cab. The centre car had a number of first class compartments, in addition to third class accommodation.
- A driving trailer coach, with third class compartments.

The third class compartments were later re-classified as second class by British Railways in 1956.

=== Specification ===
Class 505 Altrincham Electrics
Electrical system: 1,500 V DC overhead
Description	Carriage numbers			Passenger Seating Capacity	Length	Weight	Notes
Description	MSJAR	British Railways	Renumbered	Passenger Seating Capacity	Length	Weight	Notes
Driving Motor Brake Third	1–24	M28571M–M28594M		3rd: 72	58 ft (17.68 m)	57 long tons (57.9 t)	
Trailer Composite	101–122 & 151–158	101–122 & 151–152; 154–158	M29650M–M29671M & M29390M–M29396M	1st: 40; 3rd: 48 modified to 1st: 24; 3rd: 72	58 ft (17.68 m)	30 long tons (30.5 t)	151 & 152 built in 1939; 153–158 to MSJA in 1939: 153 built 1929 ex Watford DC Line, converted to Driving Trailer 74 in 1949; 154–158 built 1926 ex Southport Line
Driving Trailer Third	51–72	51–56 58–72; 74	M29231M–M29236M; M29237M; M29239M–M29252M; M29238M	3rd: 108	58 ft (17.68 m)	31 long tons (31.5 t)	Number 73 was not used; 57 withdrawn in 1948
