= Firswood tram stop =

Manchester Metrolink tram stop

Firswood
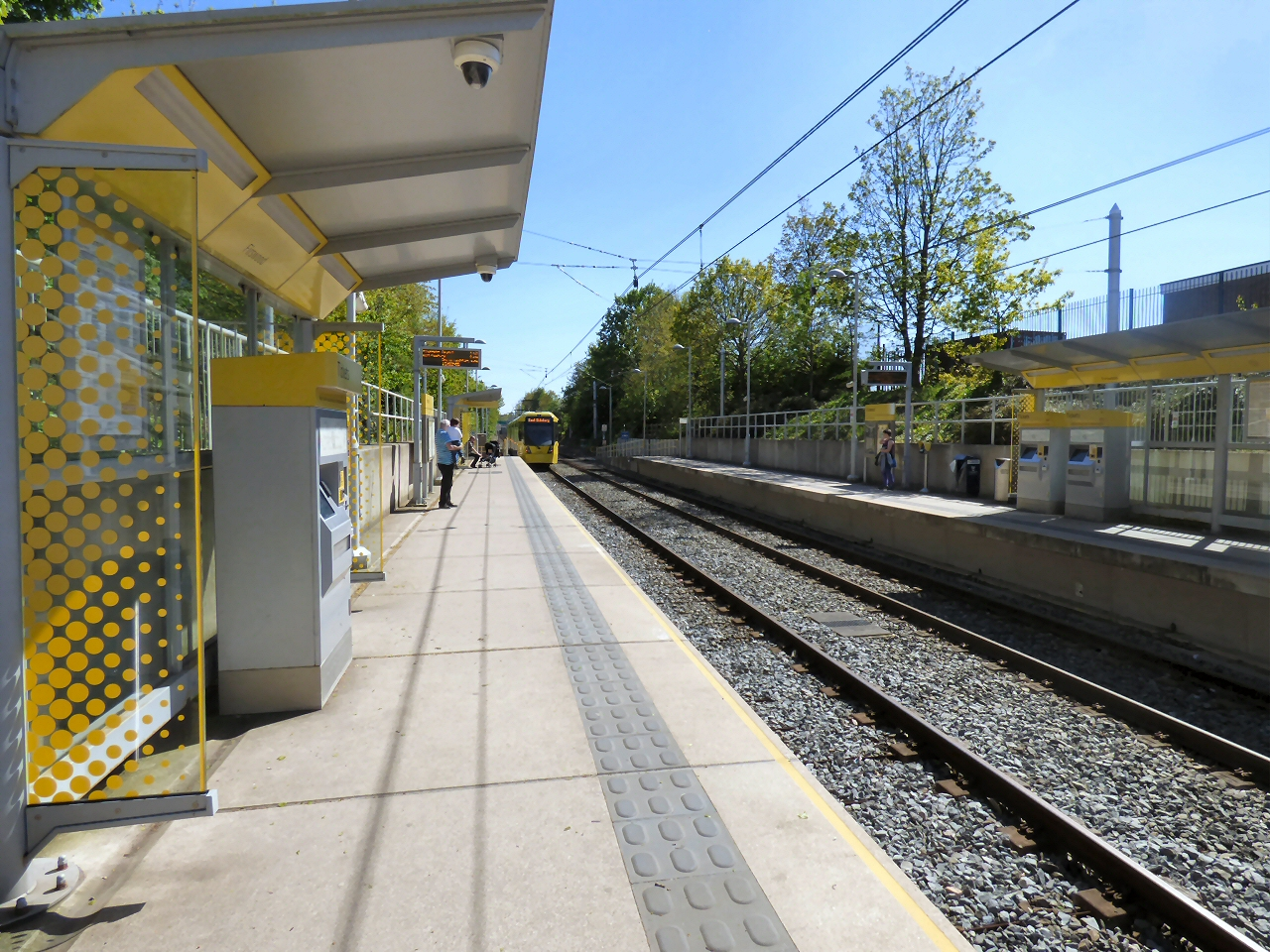

General information
- Location: Firswood, Trafford; England
- Coordinates: 53.45114°N 2.27764°W
- Grid reference: SJ816949
- System: Metrolink station
- Line: South Manchester Line
- Platforms: 2

Other information
- Status: In operation
- Fare zone: 2

History
- Original company: Manchester Metrolink

Key dates
- 7 July 2011: Opened
Route map
Location

Firswood is a tram stop on the South Manchester Line (SML) and Airport Line of Greater Manchester's light-rail Metrolink system. Located in the Firswood area of Stretford, it was built as part of Phase 3a of the network's expansion, and opened on 7 July 2011.

Firswood Metrolink station is located on a section of the former Cheshire Lines Committee railway line, in a cutting adjacent to St John Vianney School on Rye Bank Road. The stop provides access to both Firswood and Whalley Range.

== History ==
The station opened on 7 July 2011. and is the first newly constructed station on the new South Manchester Metrolink line out of Manchester. Firswood is a new station on a re-opened railway line, the Cheshire Lines Committee line, which closed to passenger service in 1967. It was planned to re-open the line as part of the expansion of the Manchester Metrolink tram network. Proposals to re-open the line have been put forward since the 1980s, but remained unfunded until the 2000s. The line extension which was originally proposed would take over the disused tracks of the Cheshire Lines Committee as far as East Didsbury.

In 2006, it was announced that Phase 3A would go ahead, including the extension of the network as far St Werburgh's Road. Following the rejection of the Greater Manchester Transport Innovation Fund in a public referendum in 2008, extension of the line as East Didsbury (Phase 3B) will now go ahead with funding from national and local government.

Construction of the line began in April 2009 and the new line became operational in July 2011.

== Services ==
Firswood is located on the South Manchester Line with trams towards Shaw and Crompton via Victoria and Oldham and to East Didsbury running every 12 minutes Monday-Saturdays and Sunday daytime and every 15 minutes Sunday early mornings and evenings. Services extended from St Werburgh's Road to East Didsbury on 23 May 2013 and, from 3 November 2014, services ran to Manchester Airport from Cornbrook.

Preceding station	Manchester Metrolink	Following station
Chorlton towards East Didsbury	East Didsbury–Rochdale	Trafford Bar towards Rochdale Town Centre
Chorlton towards East Didsbury	East Didsbury–Shaw (peak only)	Trafford Bar towards Shaw and Crompton
Chorlton towards Manchester Airport	Manchester Airport–Victoria	Trafford Bar towards Victoria

== Service pattern ==
- 12 minute service to Shaw and Crompton with double trams in the peak
- 12 minute service to Rochdale Town Centre with double trams in the peak
- 12 minute service to Victoria with single trams (every 20 minutes before 6 am)
- 6 minute service to East Didsbury with double trams in the peak
- 12 minute service to Manchester Airport with single trams (every 20 minutes before 6 am)

== Connecting bus routes ==
Firswood is not served by any direct bus service but some services stop nearby to the stop. Stagecoach Manchester service 15 stops on King's Road and runs westbound to Flixton via Stretford and Urmston and eastbound to Manchester.

== Gallery ==
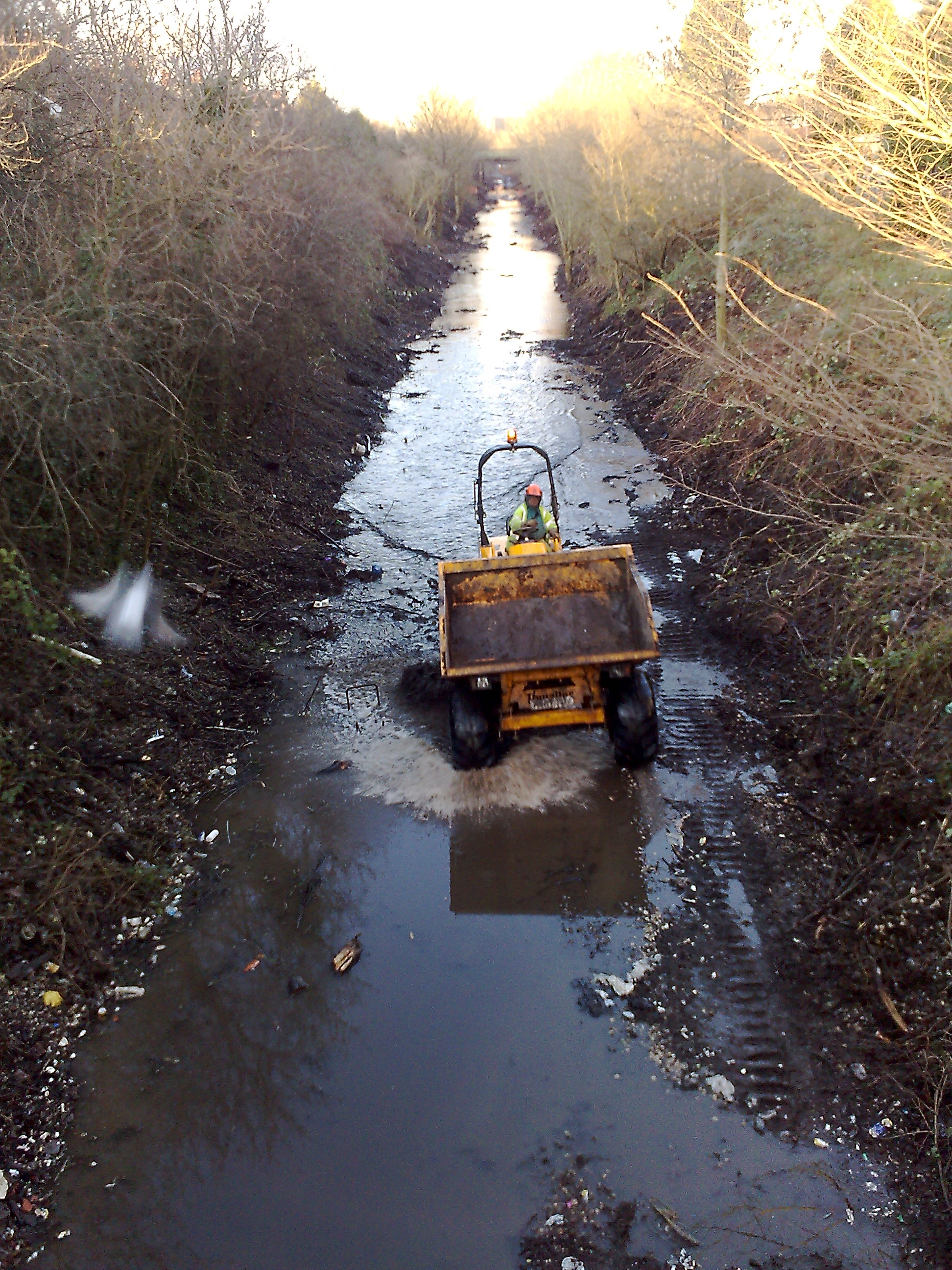
Construction work on the line near Chorlton

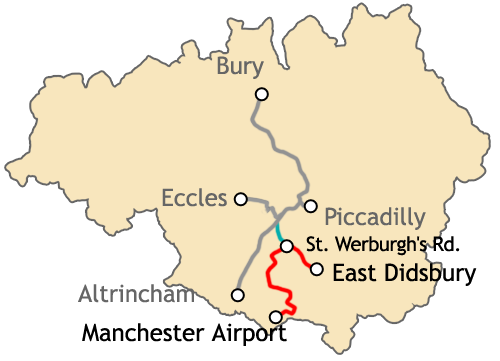
Map of the South Manchester line extensions

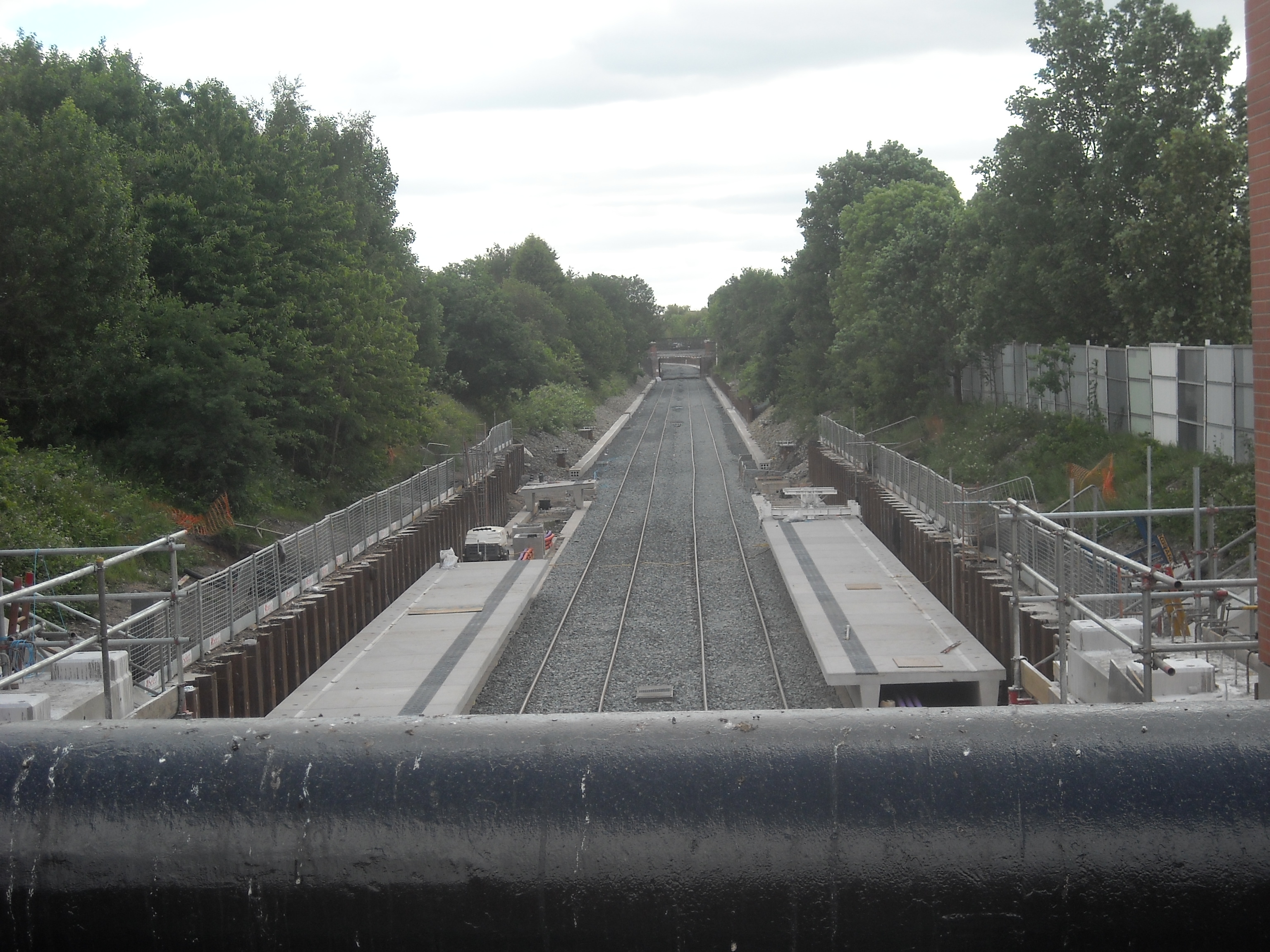
Under construction in June 2010

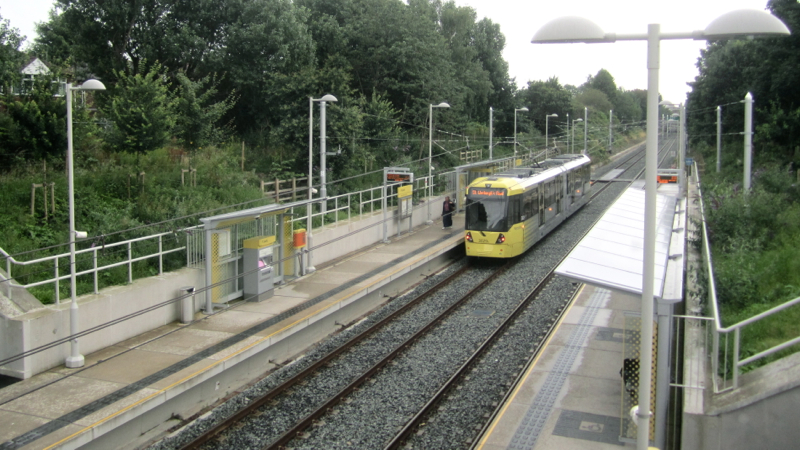
Firswood tram stop, in August 2012
