= Altrincham railway station (MSJ&AR) =

Disused railway station in Altrincham, England

Altrincham

General information
- Location: Altrincham, Trafford; England
- Coordinates: 53.3892°N 2.3481°W
- Grid reference: SJ770880

Other information
- Status: Disused

History
- Original company: Manchester, South Junction and Altrincham Railway

Key dates
- 20 July 1849: Station opened
- 3 April 1881: Station closed
Location

Altrincham railway station served the town of Altrincham (historically in Cheshire), now Greater Manchester, England between 1849 and 1881.

The station was built by the Manchester, South Junction and Altrincham Railway (MSJ&AR) and opened on 20 July 1849.

This first Altrincham station was located just south of Stockport Road level crossing and its junction with Stamford Street. The station consisted of two platforms and a station building. It served the locality until 3 April 1881 when both it and Bowdon railway station were closed, being replaced by the new large facility named Altrincham and Bowdon (now Altrincham railway station), situated between the two former stations.

There are no remains of this station today.

Preceding station	Disused railways	Following station
Bowdon; Line and station closed	Manchester, South Junction and Altrincham Railway	Timperley; Line and station open
