= Manchester, South Junction and Altrincham Railway =

Suburban railway in Manchester

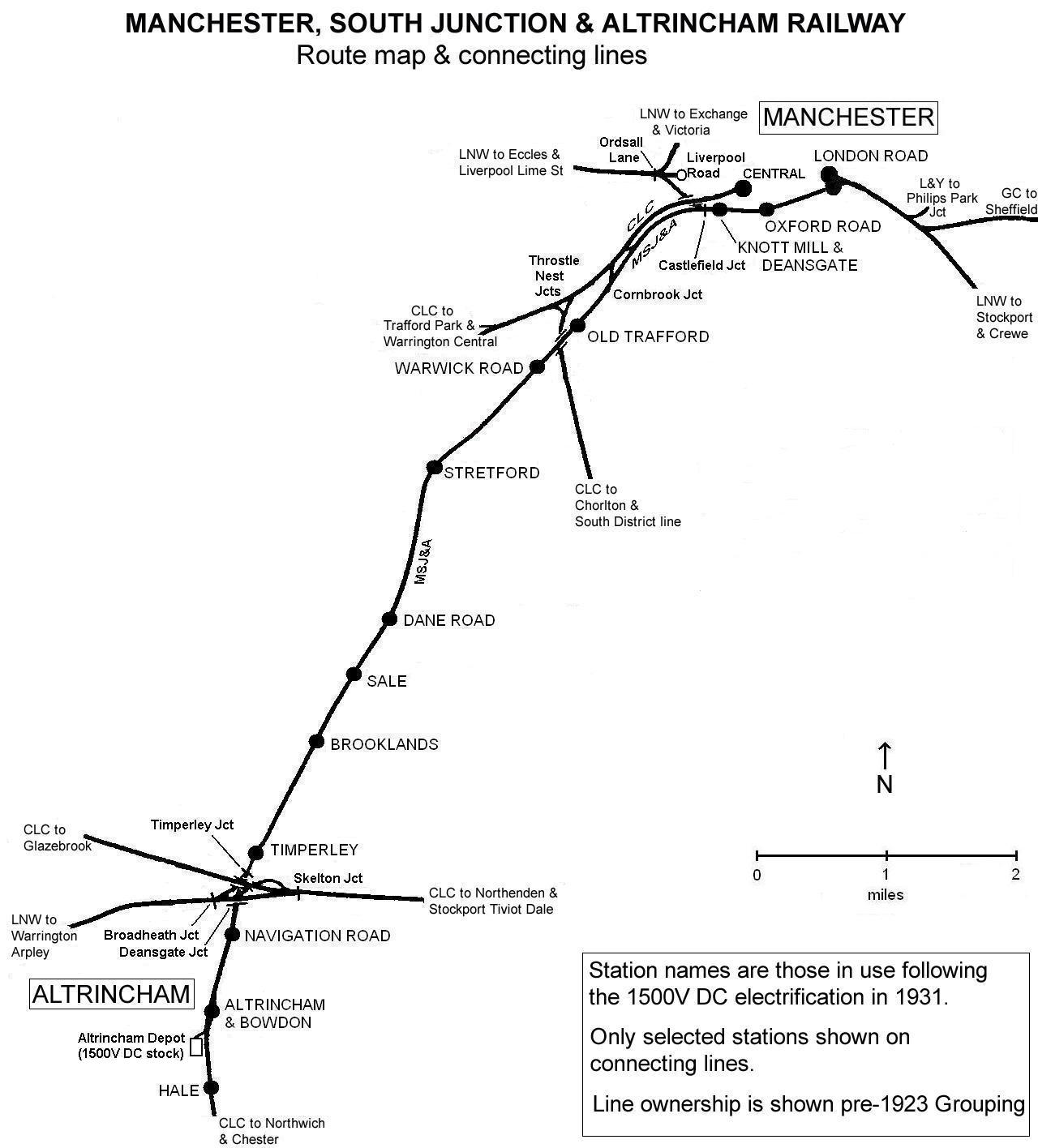
Route map of the Manchester South Junction & Altrincham Railway, showing the layout of connecting lines in the Manchester area (click for full size view)

The Manchester South Junction and Altrincham Railway (MSJ&AR) was a suburban railway which operated an 8 1/2-mile (14 km) route between Altrincham in Cheshire and Manchester London Road railway station (now Piccadilly) in Manchester.

The MSJ&AR line operated with three different systems of electrification within a period of about 60 years. The fast, frequent service resulting from the introduction of the first generation of electric trains in 1931 was a significant contributor to suburban development in the Stretford, Sale and Altrincham districts, south-west of Manchester.

The southern part of the MSJ&AR's route has been part of the Manchester Metrolink light rail system since 1992. The northern section between Manchester Piccadilly and Deansgate stations is now an intensively-used section of the National Rail network, used by trains running north and west of Manchester.

== Construction ==
Manchester London Road railway station (now Piccadilly) was opened on 8 May 1842. London Road was the terminus for two trunk lines approaching the city from the south and east: the Manchester and Birmingham Railway from Stockport and Crewe, and the Sheffield, Ashton-under-Lyne and Manchester Railway, which at that point ran only as far as Godley, but would eventually be extended to Sheffield via the Woodhead route.

Manchester South Junction and Altrincham Railway Act 1845
- Act of Parliament
- Parliament of the United Kingdom
- Long title: An Act for making a Railway to connect the Manchester and Birmingham and Liverpool and Manchester Railways in the Parish of Manchester, and also to Altrincham in the County of Chester, to be called "The Manchester South Junction and Altrincham Railway."
- Citation: 8 & 9 Vict. c. cxi

Dates
- Royal assent: 21 July 1845

Other legislation
- Repealed by: Manchester South Junction and Altrincham Railway Act 1878

Status: Repealed

Even in the early days, it was clear that the dead-end terminal at London Road would need to be connected to the other railway lines serving Manchester. The Manchester & Birmingham and the Sheffield, Ashton-under-Lyne & Manchester companies proposed an extension of their lines which would skirt the southern part of Manchester city centre on a 1 1/2-mile (2.4 km) viaduct, and join the Liverpool and Manchester Railway at Ordsall Lane in Salford. This was promoted as the South Junction Line. A branch line was also proposed, leaving the South Junction line at Castlefield (west of today's Deansgate station) and following the Bridgewater Canal to Altrincham. The Manchester South Junction and Altrincham Railway Act 1845 (8 & 9 Vict. c. cxi) received royal assent on 21 July 1845.

Transfer of the Earl of Ellesmere's Interest in the Manchester South Junction and Altrincham Railway Act 1847
- Act of Parliament
- Parliament of the United Kingdom
- Long title: An Act to authorize the Right Honourable Francis Egerton Earl of Ellesmere to sell, and the London and North-western Railway Company to purchase, the Estate and Interest of the said Earl in the Manchester South Junction and Altrincham Railway.
- Citation: 10 & 11 Vict. c. lxxiii

Dates
- Royal assent: 2 July 1847

Text of statute as originally enacted

Manchester South Junction and Altrincham Railway (Station Enlargement, &c.) Act 1848
- Act of Parliament
- Parliament of the United Kingdom
- Long title: An Act for enabling the Manchester South Junction and Altrincham Railway Company to provide additional Station Accommodation in Manchester; and for other Purposes.
- Citation: 11 & 12 Vict. c. lviii

Dates
- Royal assent: 22 July 1848

Text of statute as originally enacted

The engineers were Joseph Locke, George W. Buck and William Baker. Contracts were let on 23 October 1845 to David Bellhouse (Note: Perhaps the son of David Bellhouse.) (for the South Junction) and John Brogden (for the Altrincham Branch). After some haggling over the price of land and other matters, a report of actual construction was presented on 30 October 1846. However work was then suspended as the company had run out of money. A public offering of five-year bonds at 5% per annum raised only £50,000 so a further act of Parliament, the Manchester South Junction and Altrincham Railway (Station Enlargement, &c.) Act 1848 (11 & 12 Vict. c. lviii), passed on 22 July 1848, was required to increase the capital by £250,000 to £650,000. The two owning companies each provided half of this amount. On 20 January 1849, a viaduct near Oxford Road collapsed as the scaffolding was removed. Three men died and two were injured. Five days later the two adjacent arches failed without injury. The accepted reason was slow setting of the mortar in wet weather.

The line between Manchester Oxford Road and Altrincham opened to both goods and passenger traffic on Friday 20 July 1849. The South Junction portions from London Road to Oxford Road and from Castlefield Junction to Ordsall Lane opened on 1 August 1849. On 22 September 1849 the line was extended southwards a short distance to Bowdon, using a temporary station.

== Steam era ==
In the 19th century, the area between Manchester and Altrincham was not intensively settled; it was essentially an area dedicated to farming and market gardening. Altrincham itself was a small market town. The first steam trains operated an hourly service, but that was increased as traffic developed.

In the first forty years or so, most Altrincham trains terminated at Oxford Road station in Manchester, with only a minority extended to the main line terminal at London Road. From the 1890s onwards, most trains were extended to run to London Road, but by then, passenger trains had been withdrawn from the South Junction route to Ordsall Lane.

Following the consolidation of the smaller railway companies in the mid-19th century, the MSJ&AR passed to joint ownership by the London and North Western Railway (L&NWR) and the Manchester, Sheffield and Lincolnshire Railway (MS&LR), which was the successor of the Sheffield, Ashton-under-Lyne and Manchester and the predecessor of the Great Central Railway. Frequent disagreements between the two owners resulted in the appointment of a full-time independent arbiter to resolve disputes and ensure the day-to-day functioning of the railway.

The MSJ&AR owned its own coaches, but the haulage was provided by locomotives belonging to both the L&NWR and MS&LR companies. The MSJ&AR steam trains were unusual in retaining three classes of passenger accommodation well after most other British companies had dispensed with second class.

On 3 April 1881, the original stations at Bowdon and Altrincham were closed and replaced by a new station located between the two called Altrincham and Bowdon, at the location of today's Altrincham Interchange. Also in 1881, the terminus at the other end of the line at London Road was rebuilt as a curved island platform connected to the main station via a footbridge. This arrangement survives today as the platforms 13 and 14 at Manchester Piccadilly.

== 1500 V DC electrification ==
In the early part of the 20th century, the MSJ&AR steam trains came under increasing competition from electric tramways, which by that time ran the whole way from Manchester to Altrincham and closely followed the route of the railway.

Various electrification proposals were studied to counter this threat, although it was only after the 1923 Grouping that concrete action was taken. Following Grouping, ownership and management of the line was taken over by an MSJ&AR Committee, representing both the London, Midland and Scottish Railway (LMS) and the London and North Eastern Railway (LNER). The LNER was particularly interested in the electrification of mainline railways and in 1928 a government report had recommended 1500 V DC overhead as the national standard system.

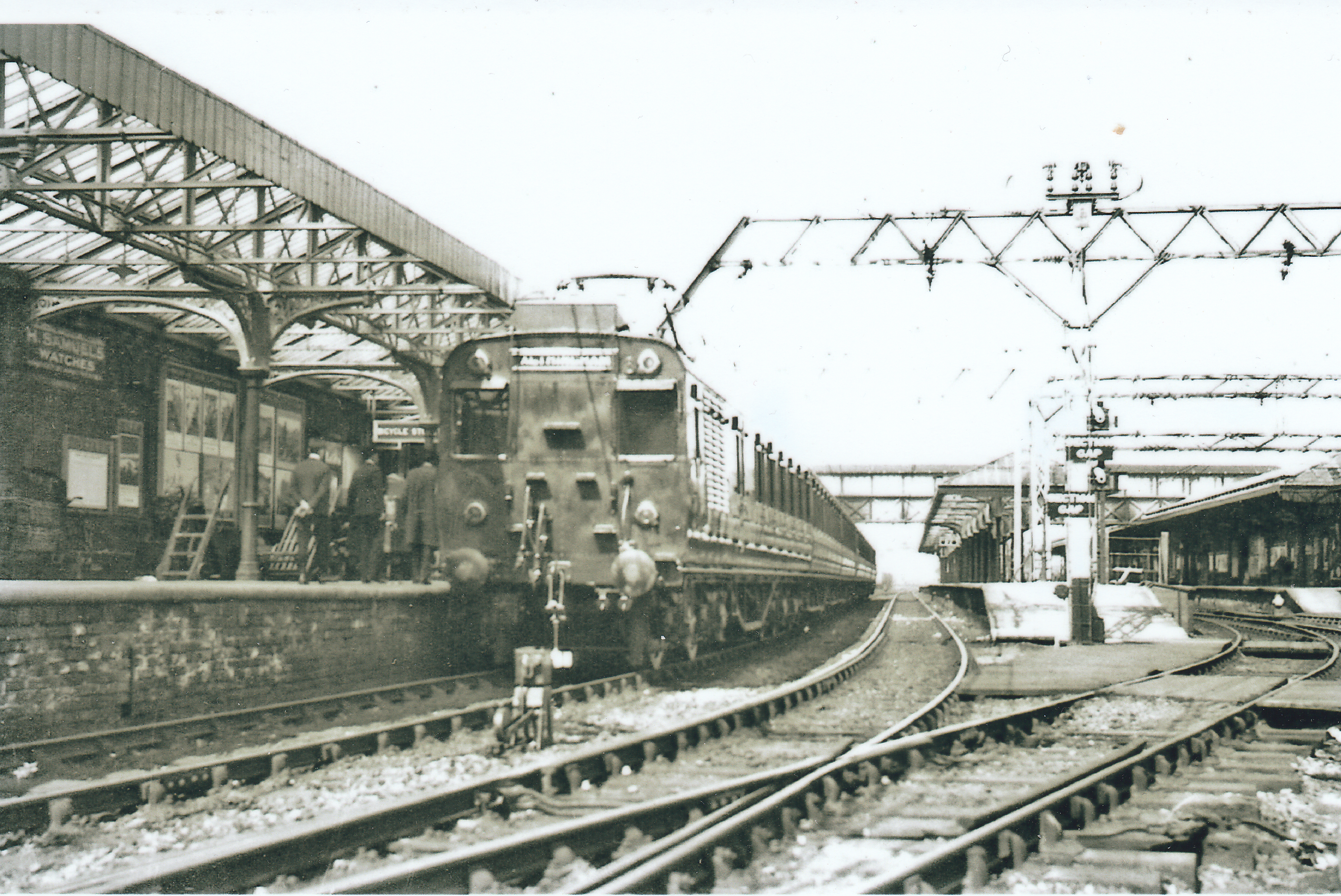
One of the 1931 1500 V EMUs at Altrincham

Despite the LNER's enthusiasm for electric traction, the LMS was the company responsible for installing most of the new electrification infrastructure on the line, while 22 new 3-car electric multiple units (EMUs) were built for the line by Metropolitan-Cammell to an LMS design. The new rolling stock was of wooden frame construction and a conservative design, with individual compartments throughout (without corridors) and offering both first- and third-class accommodation. The electric multiple units were all based at a new depot, located just south of Altrincham and Bowdon station on the site of the original MSJ&AR Bowdon terminus.

The new trains began test runs in 1930 and on 11 May 1931 the London Road to Altrincham local service became fully electric. Coinciding with the electric service, new suburban stations were opened at Dane Road and Navigation Road. The station formerly called Old Trafford Cricket Ground (which had opened only for matches at the nearby Lancashire County Cricket Club, or Manchester United football ground) was opened full-time and renamed Warwick Road.

The Altrincham Electrics provided a faster, more frequent service than the steam trains they had replaced, and resulted in an 89% increase in patronage on the line within the first five years. The new electric service also stimulated further suburban housing development close to the line, and provided an early example of today's marketing taglines when the railway's publicists dubbed the initials MSJ&AR as Many Short Journeys and Absolute Reliability.

As well as local trains, the Altrincham Electrics also provided express services at certain times of day, making use of a four-track section of line between Sale and Old Trafford. Some of the all-station electric trains ran only between Manchester and Sale, while steam-hauled passenger and goods trains also used the MSJ&AR to travel to destinations beyond the boundaries of electrification at either end of the line. Passenger trains ran from the ex-Cheshire Lines Committee (CLC) line from Chester Northgate to Manchester Central, diverging from the MSJ&AR at Cornbrook Junction. There was also a local service from the ex-LNWR line from Warrington Arpley, via Lymm which terminated at Manchester London Road.

The success of the MSJ&AR and the reliability of the 1500 V DC distribution encouraged the LNER to pursue further electrification. These projects were disrupted and delayed by World War II, but in 1954 the first mainline electric railway in northern Britain was completed from Sheffield Victoria to Manchester London Road via the Woodhead route, using 1500 V DC overhead. This line approached London Road from the east and although it was equipped with the same electrification system as the MSJ&AR and had its own fleet of 1500 V DC suburban EMUs (later to be classified as Class 506), the two electric lines were never connected at London Road and the two types of EMU never ventured onto each other's territory.

In common with most railway routes, passenger traffic on the MSJ&AR declined significantly in the 1960s as travel patterns changed and more people had access to private cars. As a result, the Altrincham Electric express services were withdrawn, along some of the rolling stock and many of the goods trains using the route. The quadruple section of MSJ&AR track was reduced to conventional double track in 1963 and Manchester Central station closed on 5 May 1969, with trains from the ex-CLC Chester and Warrington lines being diverted to terminate at Oxford Road.

== Conversion to 25 kV AC ==
In the 1950s, British Railways chose 25 kV 50 Hz AC overhead in place of 1500 V DC as the standard for all future main line electrification outside the Southern Region. In September 1960 the first stage of the electrified West Coast Main Line opened between Manchester and Crewe, using the 25 kV AC system. At the same time, Manchester London Road station was extensively rebuilt (including the MSJ&AR platforms) and was renamed Manchester Piccadilly. From 15 September 1958 all Altrincham trains were cut back to the bay platform at Oxford Road to allow the reconstruction to proceed at London Road. The short section between Piccadilly and Oxford Road stations was converted to 25 kV AC, and on 21 September 1960, suburban electric services from the Styal and Stockport lines began to use Oxford Road as their city terminus.

By the late 1960s the Altrincham Electrics were approaching forty years of age. Rather than replace them with new rolling stock operating on the non-standard 1500 V DC system, the decision was made to withdraw the trains and convert the whole Altrincham line to 25 kV AC. The last 1500 V DC train was the 23:35 from Oxford Road on 30 April 1971. Altrincham depot closed and all the 1931 rolling stock (provisionally assigned to Class 505 by British Rail) was withdrawn from service.

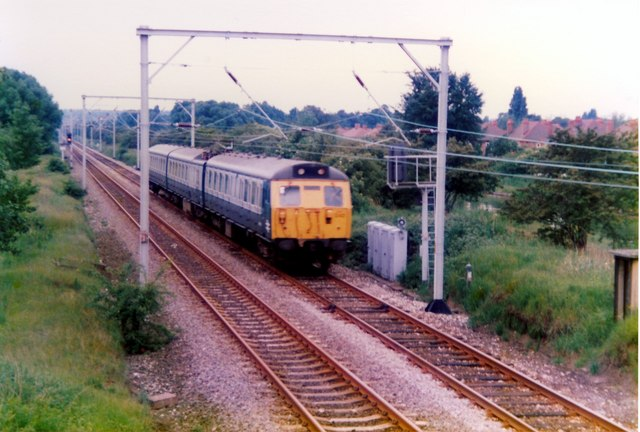
A Class 304 unit near Sale in 1989.

On Monday 3 May 1971, a 15-minute interval service was introduced from Altrincham, running through Manchester Piccadilly to Alderley Edge and Crewe. The unique 40-year-old, three-car Altrincham Electrics were replaced by 12-year-old, four-car Class 304 25 kV AC EMUs, based at Longsight depot. Three of the 1931 stock centre trailer cars were preserved and two are now undergoing restoration at the Midland Railway - Butterley in Derbyshire. However, none of the motor coaches was preserved.

Following conversion in 1971, the AC services on the Altrincham line continued relatively unchanged for the next twenty years.

- From the mid-1970s, the Greater Manchester PTE took a proactive role in promoting and providing financial support for local train services in Greater Manchester. In November 1976, a bus/rail interchange was opened in the forecourt of Altrincham station, the first purpose-built interchange in the Greater Manchester area. Bus schedules were revised to connect with trains to and from Manchester, new vehicles were assigned to the bus routes and the services were promoted with a special Interlink branding.
- Some trains were diverted to terminate at Hazel Grove when the suburban electrification was extended to that point in June 1981.
- In the 1980s the four-car Class 304s were reduced to three cars during a refurbishment programme, and first class accommodation was eliminated. In 1984 a small number of refurbished Class 303 EMUs, formerly used in the Glasgow area, were deployed in the Manchester suburban area and these also appeared in service on the Altrincham line.
- In 1988, the original section of the South Junction line between Castlefield Junction (adjacent to Deansgate station) and the Victoria to Liverpool Lime Street line, was revitalised by the opening of the Windsor Link to Salford Crescent. The Windsor Link allowed trains from Manchester Piccadilly and Oxford Road to reach the lines to Wigan, Bolton and Preston and opened up many potential destinations (both local and long distance) for trains from the south side of Manchester. Full exploitation of the Windsor Link depended on conversion of the Altrincham line to Metrolink operation, which freed up many train paths along the congested section between Deansgate and Piccadilly.

== Conversion to Metrolink ==
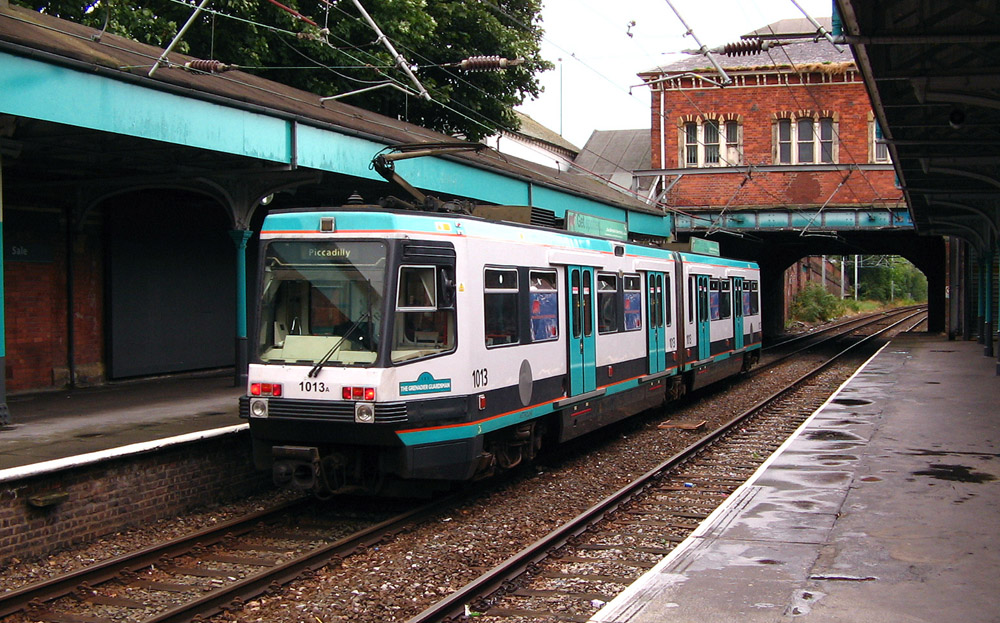
Metrolink T-68 tram at Sale tram stop in 2006, following conversion of the MSJ&AR route to light rail operation.

The Manchester Metrolink is a light rail scheme introduced in the Manchester area in the early 1990s with the aims of reducing traffic congestion by providing modern, attractive public transport options for journeys into the city centre, and offering more convenient interchange between the rail systems north and south of the city. Phase I of Metrolink involved converting the British Rail lines from Victoria to Bury and Piccadilly to Altrincham to light rail operation, and linking the two by a street-running section through the city centre.

The conversion of the Altrincham line to Metrolink was originally stated to require no more than six weeks. In the event, the line was closed for some six months, during which time both all-stations and a rush-hour express (first stop Sale) substitute bus services were provided. Rail tickets were valid on the replacement buses, operated by the North Western Road Car Company and running daily except Sundays. Two other operators provided the extra weekday peak-hour services. The last conventional service 25 kV AC train on the MSJAR was the 21:05 Oxford Road to Altrincham on 24 December 1991. The line reopened on 15 June 1992, with Metrolink light-rail vehicles running from Altrincham through Manchester's city streets to Piccadilly and Bury.

During rebuilding, a number of changes were made to infrastructure along the MSJ&AR route.

- Overhead electrical supply was converted from 25 kV AC to 750 V DC. Most of the existing overhead supports were retained.
- Nine stations were reconstructed to Metrolink standard, providing full disabled access, upgraded lighting, public address and information systems and Metrolink signage and automatic ticket machines.
- Several stations were renamed: the former Old Trafford became Trafford Bar, while Warwick Road became Old Trafford.
- New signalling was installed, appropriate to light-rail conditions and controlled from the Metrolink control centre.
- A new underpass was built at the former Cornbrook Junction, which carried the Metrolink tracks beneath the British Rail line to Warrington Central. The Manchester – Warrington Central – Liverpool line was still a busy main line, used by local and long-distance trains, and is electrified at 25 kV AC for a short distance west of Manchester to provide access for electric trains to Trafford Park freight terminal.
- After passing beneath the Warrington line, the Altrincham Metrolink route used the refurbished former CLC viaduct from Cornbrook to Manchester Central, before entering the street-running section in St. Peter's Square.
- In the Altrincham area, two independent, parallel single tracks were arranged between Deansgate Junction (south of Timperley) and Navigation Road. The western (former Manchester-bound) track is used by Metrolink services in both directions, while the eastern (formerly Altrincham-bound) is used by trains from Stockport to Altrincham and on towards Chester. The heavy-rail section is still used by freight trains and passenger services on the Mid-Cheshire Line, which continue to use two of the four platforms at Altrincham station.

When Metrolink opened, a 12-minute frequency was provided between Altrincham and Piccadilly, enhanced at peak hours by a second 12-minute frequency from Altrincham to Bury via Manchester city centre. Off-peak passenger demand for the new service proved stronger than expected, not least due to the availability of concessionary fares for students and pensioners on Metrolink in common with local bus services. Consequently, the 6-minute frequency was extended to operate all day Monday to Saturday, with trams alternating to Piccadilly and Bury. By contrast, peak-hour demand proved lower than originally forecast due to fare increases over those previously in force for British Rail services.

== See also ==
- Manchester Metrolink
- Greater Manchester PTE
- Class 304 25 kV AC EMUs
- Class 505 1500 V DC Altrincham Electrics
- Suburban electrification of the London, Midland and Scottish Railway
- Cheshire Lines Committee
- Great Central Railway
