= Old Trafford (area) =

Area of Trafford in Greater Manchester, England

Coordinates: 53.4603°N 2.287°W

- Area
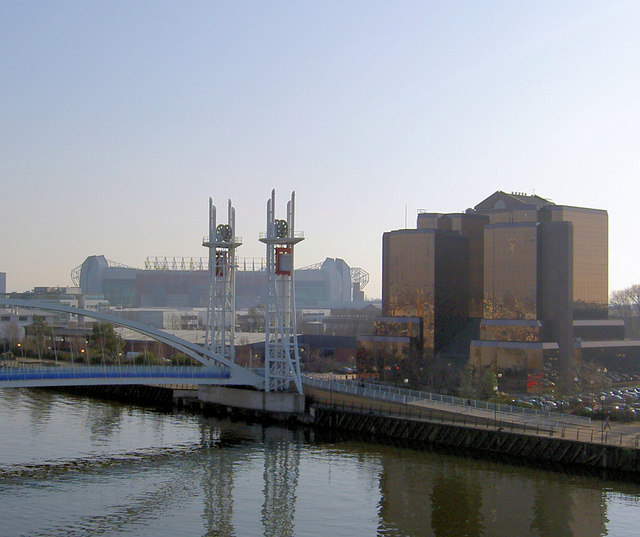
- Old Trafford Football Stadium and Key West seen from Salford Quays

- Location within Greater Manchester
- Population: 13,000
- OS grid reference: SJ825955
- Metropolitan borough: Trafford
- Metropolitan county: Greater Manchester
- Region: North West
- Country: England
- Sovereign state: United Kingdom
- Post town: MANCHESTER
- Postcode district: M15, M16, M32
- Dialling code: 0161
- Police: Greater Manchester
- Fire: Greater Manchester
- Ambulance: North West
- UK Parliament: Stretford and Urmston

Old Trafford is an area of Trafford, Greater Manchester, England, which borders the cities of Manchester and Salford, two miles (3.2 km) south-west of Manchester city centre in the historic county of Lancashire. It is the north-eastern tip of the parliamentary constituency of Stretford and Urmston and is roughly delineated by two old toll gates, Brooks' Bar and Trafford Bar, to the east and west.

Old Trafford is the site of Old Trafford Cricket Ground, home of Lancashire County Cricket Club, and Old Trafford football stadium, the home of Manchester United.

== History ==
Old Trafford was a crossing point over the River Irwell in ancient times. The name Old Trafford possibly derives from the time when there were two Trafford Halls, Old Trafford Hall and New Trafford Hall. The old hall was close to what is now the White City Retail Park, and was said to have been the home of the de Trafford family since 1017, until the family moved to the new hall in what is now Trafford Park, some time between 1672 and 1720. The name of the area around Old Trafford Hall may subsequently have become shortened to Old Trafford. The old hall was demolished in 1939.

In the 1820s, Manchester scientist John Dalton chose Old Trafford as the site for a Royal Horticultural and Botanical Gardens because of its clean, unpolluted air, and so began the area's association with sports and recreation. The popularity of the botanical gardens, which was similar to The Crystal Palace, led wealthy people to build large houses in the area. In 1857, and again in 1887, the gardens staged exhibitions of art treasures, the former as part of the Art Treasures Exhibition and the latter in celebration of Queen Victoria's silver jubilee. The Hallé Orchestra was formed to participate in the first of these exhibitions. The site of the botanical gardens was purchased by White City Limited in 1907, and it subsequently became an amusement park, although the name lives on in the street called Botanical Gardens.

From the 1950s to the 1970s, White City Stadium was used as a greyhound racing track and for stock car racing. This site is now White City Retail Park. The front entrance is all that has been preserved of the old botanical gardens. Nearby, on the site of what is now the Greater Manchester Police Headquarters, was Henshaw's Institute for the Blind, which originally opened as Henshaw's Blind Asylum in 1837. Next door on the same site was the Royal Institute for the Deaf, where the film Mandy was made.

Old Trafford expanded and became an urban area after the building of the Manchester Ship Canal in the 1890s, and the subsequent development of nearby Trafford Park Industrial Estate, in the early 20th century. Trafford Park provided employment for thousands of local residents. Employment was also provided on a smaller scale, notably by the railways (Trafford Park shed alone had over 300 staff), Duerr's Jams, Vimto, Arkady Soya Mill and Ludwig Oppenheimer Mosaics. The Royal Army Medical Corps and the Territorial Army have well-established bases in the area.

Slum clearances during the 1960s and early 1970s saw some of the old Victorian housing stock demolished. However, after the perceived failure of the deck-access concrete crescents of Hulme, Old Trafford's residents preferred renovation to demolition. As a result, there are still many Victorian terraced streets in the area.

By 1985, employment at Trafford Park had fallen to 24,500, as unemployment in the northwest soared above 30 per cent in some inner-city areas. Nearby Manchester Docks, which had also been a major source of local employment, closed in 1982. As the revitalised Salford Quays it has become an emblematic part of the regeneration of Manchester in general.

== Governance ==
Old Trafford was formerly a hamlet in the township of Stretford. It was in the Municipal Borough of Stretford until 1974. In 1974, as a result of the Local Government Act 1972, it became part of the Metropolitan Borough of Trafford in Greater Manchester. Since the realignment of Trafford's ward boundaries in 2004, Old Trafford has been divided between Clifford and Longford wards, with the larger part being in the former.

Old Trafford is part of the parliamentary constituency of Stretford and Urmston, and represents the northeastern tip of Trafford. The current Member of Parliament is Andrew Western of the Labour Party.

In 2005, Trafford Council proposed to the Boundary Commission for England that the wards of Gorse Hill, Longford, and Clifford – which includes Old Trafford – should be moved into a new Salford and The Quays constituency, along with some other wards from Salford. At the subsequent public enquiry in November 2005, Beverley Hughes opposed the change, as well as an alternative proposal to create a constituency of Salford and Old Trafford. The Boundary Commission rejected Trafford Council's proposals, noting that there was "strong opposition to the creation of a constituency that crossed the Manchester Ship Canal and ... that the Canal provided a clearly identifiable boundary which should not be breached".

== Geography ==
Old Trafford borders Firswood, Gorse Hill and Trafford Park. The area is effectively a peninsula, with its northern boundary the River Irwell, now canalised into the Manchester Ship Canal, and to the east a tributary of the Irwell, the Cornbrook, culverted as the area grew in the 19th century. The southern boundary, the Black Brook, was culverted at about the same time, under Upper Chorlton Road. Some small anomalies due to the brook's underground route were not amended until the late 1980s.

Old Trafford makes up the northeastern tip of Stretford and adjoins St. Georges, Hulme, Whalley Range and Moss Side – all of which are in the City of Manchester – and Ordsall to the northeast, which is in the City of Salford. At the crossroads of Brooks's Bar, the boundaries between Old Trafford and Hulme and Moss Side and Whalley Range meet.

On the western side of the area, Seymour Grove is named after the millionaire grocer Sir Thomas Seymour Mead.

== Sports grounds ==
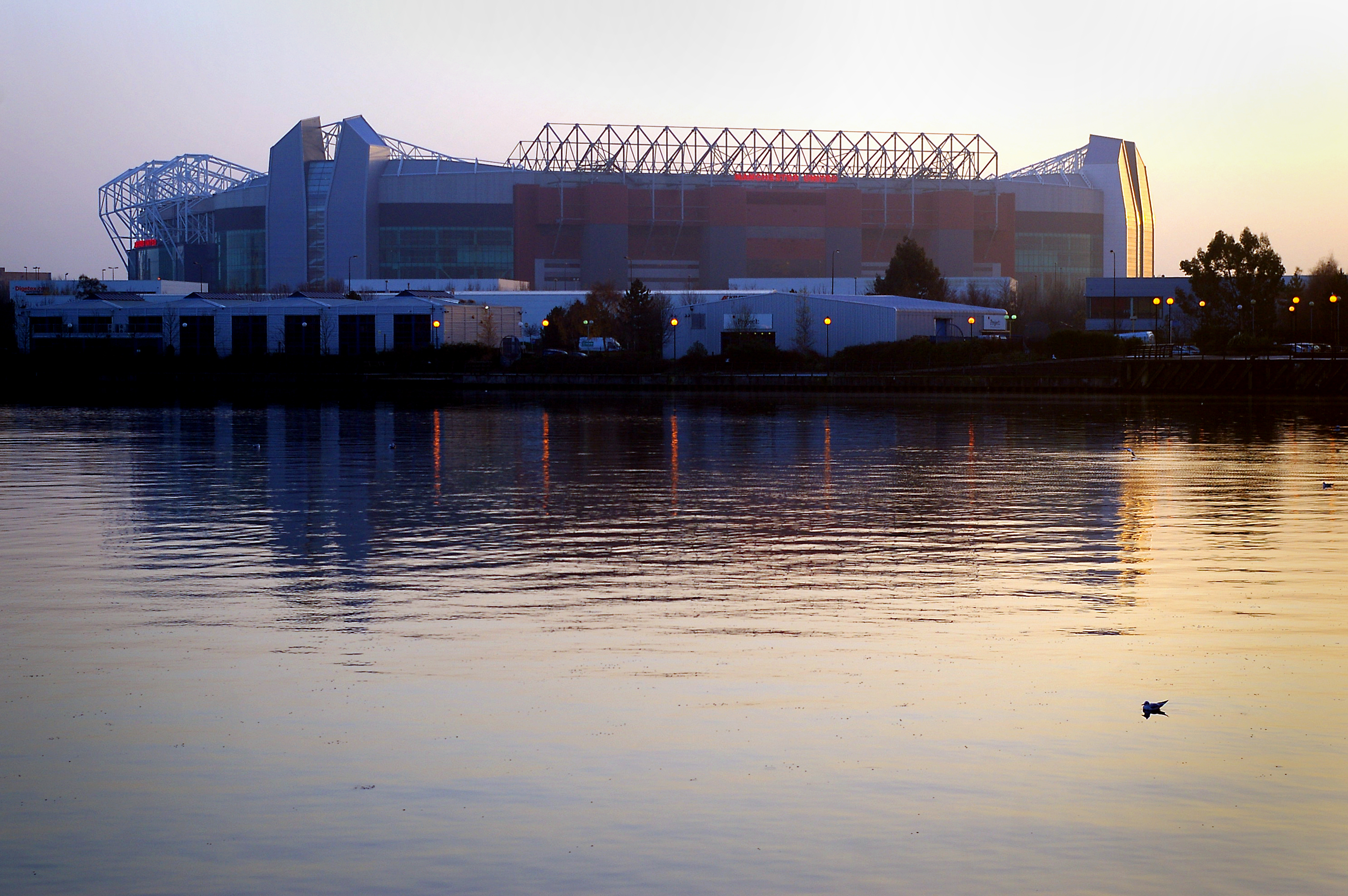
Old Trafford Football Stadium, home of Manchester United F.C.

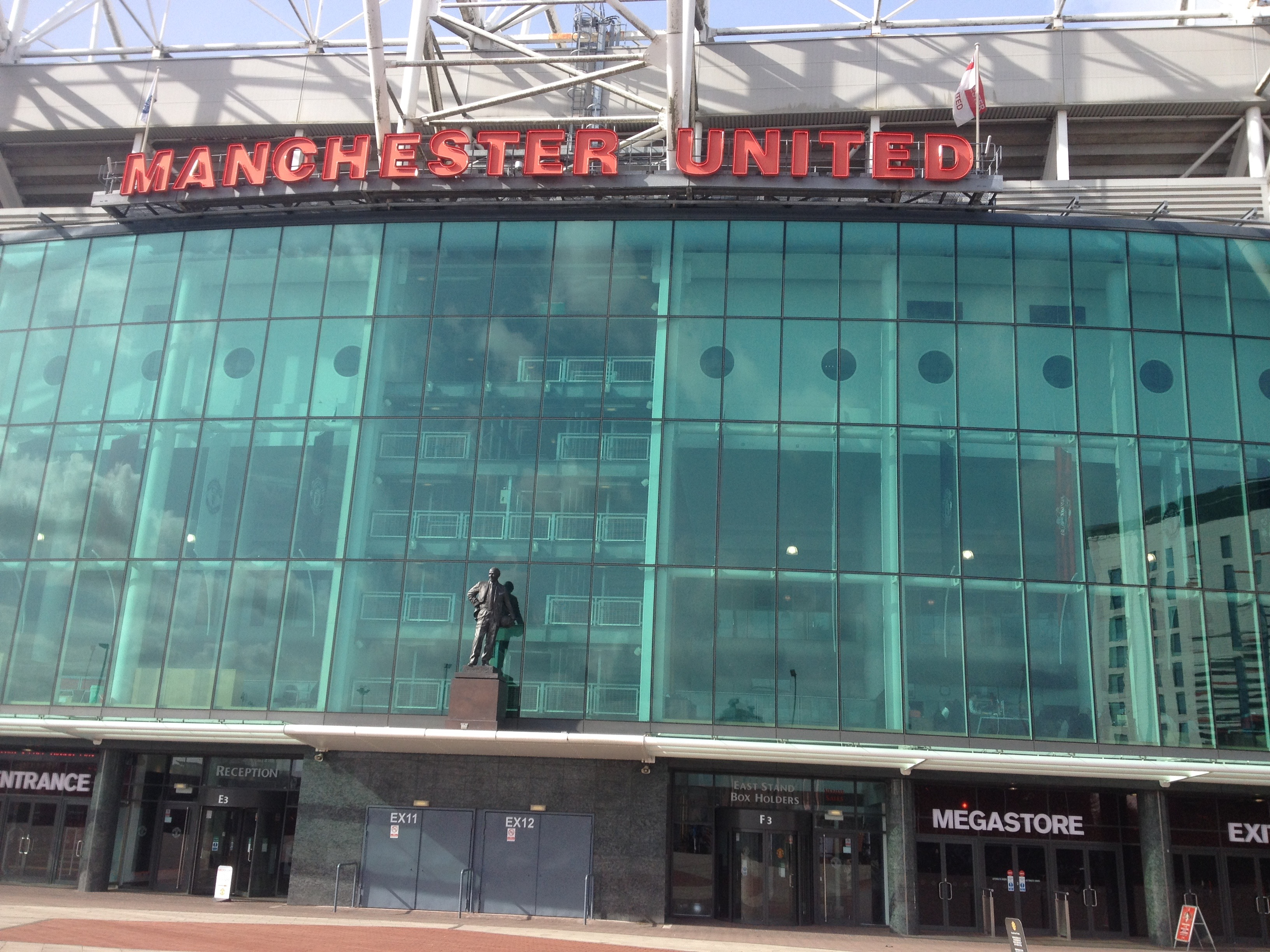
Old Trafford

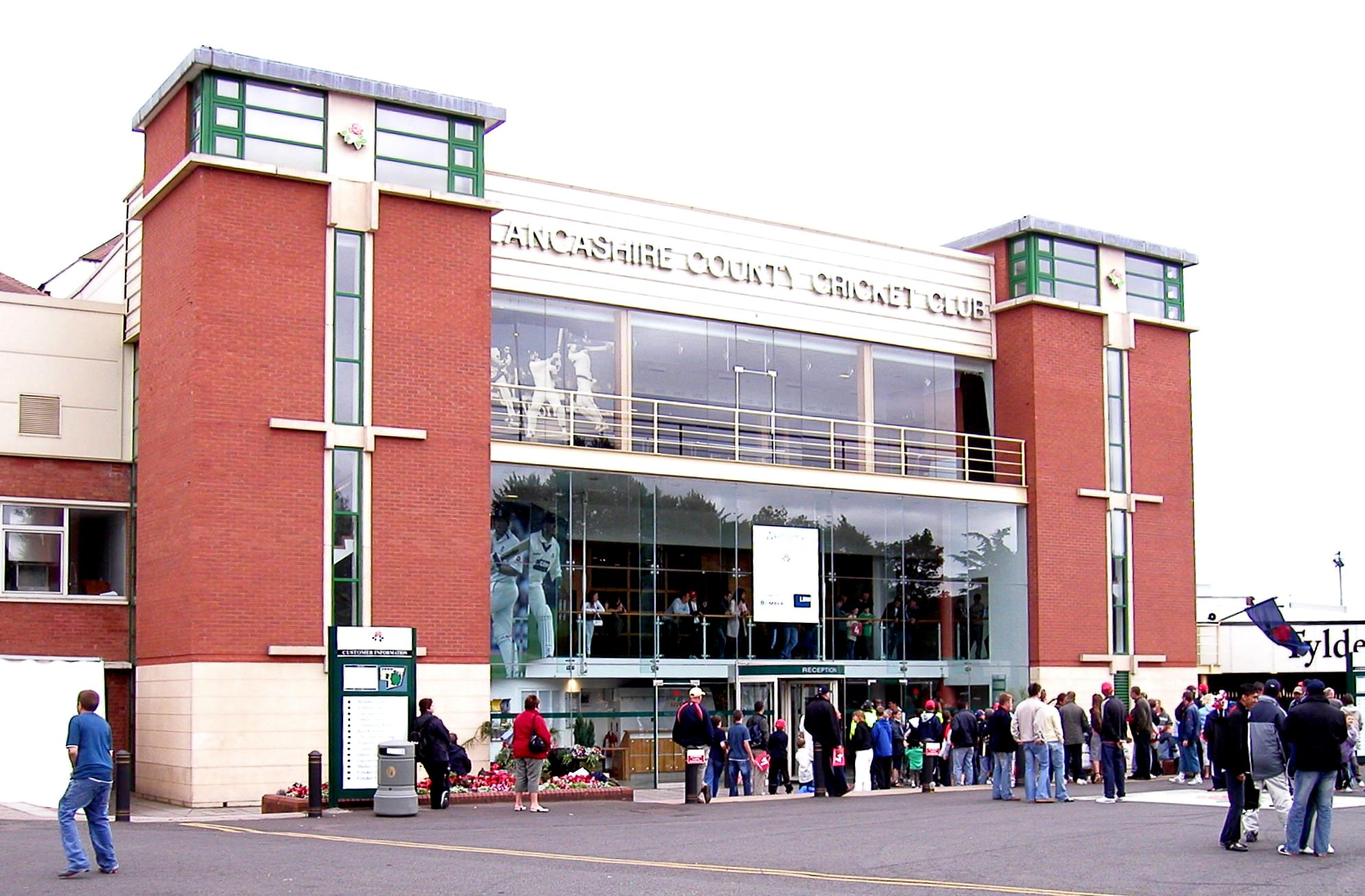
Lancashire County Cricket Club

Old Trafford has been the site of Lancashire County Cricket Club's Old Trafford stadium since 1857. Before the club's formation, in 1864, it had been the home of Manchester Cricket Club, who had moved here in 1856. Manchester United F.C.'s ground, which is also known as Old Trafford, is close by. The two stadiums are linked via Warwick Road, but the part of the route closest to the football ground is now named Sir Matt Busby Way (formerly Warwick Road North), and the part closest to the cricket ground is Brian Statham Way (formerly part of Warwick Road). (The southern continuation of the road on the other side of the Metrolink line is Warwick Road South.)

The ground of the Northern Lawn Tennis Club was in Old Trafford from 1882 to 1909 (near the cricket ground): this is commemorated in the name of Tennis Street. The move to West Didsbury in 1909 was prompted by the industrialisation of Trafford Park and consequent air pollution. The half-timbered pavilion was dismantled and re-erected at the new ground.

== Former cinemas ==
Until the mid-20th century there were four cinemas in Old Trafford: the Imperial Picture Theatre in Chorlton Road, Brooks Bar, The Globe on Cornbrook Street, The Lyceum in City Road and the Trafford Picture House in Talbot Road. Three of the buildings have survived, although not now operated as cinemas. The Imperial opened in 1913, and for a brief period in the 1970s it became an Asian films cinema. It closed in 1979, and the building is now occupied by a timber and ironmongery business. The premises occupied by The Globe were originally part of the Manchester Carriage and Tramways Company's horse-drawn tramway depot. The cinema closed in the mid-1960s, and is now used as a warehouse. The Lyceum opened in 1915, and it also closed in the 1960s. Its building is now used for private functions. The Trafford Picture House opened in 1922, and closed in 1958. After a period when it was used as a vehicle auction room the building became derelict, and it was demolished in 1997.

== Community ==
Today, Old Trafford has approximately 13,000 residents. Cultural diversity has been a feature of the area for over a century. Irish immigrants settled in the locality from the 1880s, coming to Manchester to work on the ship canal. Polish and east European migrants arrived during and after the Second World War. The Afro-Caribbean community arrived and settled in the 1950s and 1960s. People from the Indian sub-continent started to arrive during the 1960s but settled in more significant numbers from the 1980s onwards.

Old Trafford is among the 10% most deprived areas in England, suffering problems of unemployment, poor housing and low educational achievement. It also has levels of youth crime well above the national average.

Ayres Road and its environs are the heart of modern-day Old Trafford and a walk down this road gives a real flavour of the multi-cultural nature of the neighbourhood, with its variety of grocers' shops selling food stuffs from Europe, the Caribbean and Southeast Asia; its Catholic church, St. Alphonsus, frequented by a predominantly Irish congregation, the vibrant and busy St John's Community Centre and Shizhan House, the Chinese Medicine Centre, on the site of the old Vimto offices. Something of this atmosphere is evoked by Manchester poet Lemn Sissay in his poem Ayres Road.

The former library on Stretford Road has been converted into a Chinese cultural centre. For many years the numerous Polish community had a focal point in their ex-servicemen's club on Shrewsbury Street but this club has closed.

== Religion ==
Only 45% of the residents of Clifford ward (the ward that contains the larger part of Old Trafford) reported themselves as being Christian in the 2001 Census, compared to 76% across Trafford as a whole, and 72% across England. This is reflected in the unusually high number of non-Christian places of worship in the area.

Since the 1980s Old Trafford has become home to two large South Asian communities – Punjabi Pakistanis – almost all being Muslim. Muslims represent the largest non-Christian religious group in the area, with 28% of the population, compared to 3% in the whole of Trafford. To service this community there are four mosques in the area; the Faizan-e-Islam mosque, the Masjid-e-Hidayah, the Masjid-e-Noor and the Masjid Imdadia.

There is also a smaller Sikh community, with its own gurdwara in Whalley Range, the Sangat Bhatra Sikh Temple, Upper Chorlton Road. Sikhs account for 4% of the area's population, significantly above the less than 1% average for Trafford and England.

There is a Buddhist temple, the Fo Kang Shang Buddhist Temple, although Buddhists are recorded as making up only 0.2% of the area's population, roughly the same proportion as for Jews.

=== Churches ===
The Catholic church of St Alphonsus (1904) on Ayres Road, Old Trafford, is in the Diocese of Salford, and the Church of England churches are in the Diocese of Manchester.

The Anglican church of St Bride was founded in 1878 (architects Pennington & Bridgen) a second church was opened in 1991: the present third building (part of the Limelight health centre) was opened in 2016. The church originated as a mission om Cornbrook Street in 1863; the church of 1878 was in the Gothic Revival style.

== Education ==
Along with the rest of Trafford, Old Trafford maintains a selective education system assessed by the Eleven-plus examination. There is only one secondary school in Old Trafford; a private, female-only, Muslim secondary school but there are three primary schools within the area.

== Notable people ==
Notable people who were born or lived in the area include political and social activist Sylvia Pankhurst, singer Ian Curtis of Joy Division and his wife, the author Deborah Curtis, former Smiths lead singer Morrissey, artist L. S. Lowry, aviator John Alcock, Dodie Smith, the author of 101 Dalmatians. Old Trafford also produced two Victoria Cross winners in the First World War: Charles Coverdale, a sergeant in the Manchester Regiment, and James Marshall, an officer in the Lancashire Fusiliers. Rebecca Long-Bailey, MP for Salford and Eccles was born in Old Trafford.
