= 1971 Sale Municipal Borough Council election =

Local election in Cheshire, England

← 1970	13 May 1971	1972 →

8 of 32 seats to Sale Municipal Borough Council 16 seats needed for a majority
	First party	Second party	Third party
Party	Conservative	Labour	Liberal
Last election	5 seats, 48.9%	4 seats, 28.8%	2 seats, 21.5%
Seats before	22	7	3
Seats won	3	3	2
Seats after	18	9	5
Seat change	▼4	▲2	▲2
Popular vote	8,095	4,923	4,412
Percentage	45.8%	27.9%	25.0%
Swing	▼3.1%	▼0.9%	▲3.5%
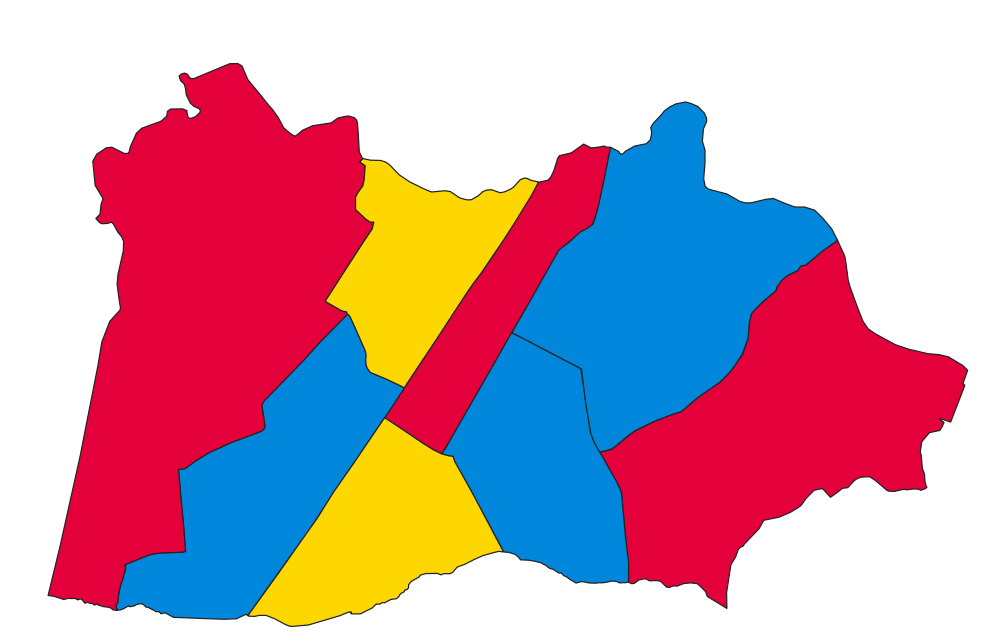
- Map of results of 1971 election
Leader of the Council before election
Conservative
Leader of the Council after election
Conservative

Elections to Sale Council were held on Thursday, 13 May 1971. One third of the councillors were up for election, with each successful candidate to serve a three-year term of office. The Conservative Party retained overall control of the council.

== Election result ==
Party	Votes		Seats			Full Council	
Conservative Party	8,095 (45.8%)	▼3.1	3 (37.5%)	3 / 8	▼4	18 (56.3%)	18 / 32
Labour Party	4,923 (27.9%)	▼0.9	3 (37.5%)	3 / 8	▲2	9 (28.1%)	9 / 32
Liberal Party	4,412 (25.0%)	▲3.5	2 (25.0%)	2 / 8	▲2	5 (15.6%)	5 / 32
Independent	124 (0.7%)	N/A	0 (0.0%)	0 / 8	N/A	0 (0.0%)	0 / 32
Communist Party	116 (0.7%)	▼0.1	0 (0.0%)	0 / 8	Steady	0 (0.0%)	0 / 32

=== Full council ===
↓
9	5	18

=== Aldermen ===
↓
2	6

=== Councillors ===
↓
7	5	12

== Ward results ==
=== Brooklands ===
Brooklands
Party	Candidate	Votes	%	±%
Liberal	C. S. Fink	970	44.7	−6.5
Conservative	J. G. Blakeway*	948	43.6	−5.2
Labour	E. McPherson	253	11.7	N/A
Majority		22	1.1	−1.3
Turnout		2,171		
Liberal gain from Conservative		Swing		

=== Mersey ===
Mersey
Party	Candidate	Votes	%	±%
Liberal	B. Clancy	1,056	57.0	
Conservative	I. H. Hurst*	797	43.0	
Majority		259	14.0	
Turnout		1,853		
Liberal gain from Conservative		Swing		

=== St. Anne's ===
St. Anne's
Party	Candidate	Votes	%	±%
Conservative	J. H. Harvey*	1,107	40.7	−9.0
Liberal	H. A. Brown	977	36.0	−14.3
Labour	M. Rose	633	23.3	N/A
Majority		130	4.7	
Turnout		2,717		
Conservative hold		Swing		

=== St. John's ===
St. John's
Party	Candidate	Votes	%	±%
Conservative	K. Orton*	1,152	59.4	+3.9
Liberal	G. C. Pearson	786	40.6	+11.1
Majority		366	18.8	−8.2
Turnout		1,938		
Conservative hold		Swing		

=== St. Martin's ===
St. Martin's
Party	Candidate	Votes	%	±%
Labour	A. Z. Keller	1,670	52.8	+0.6
Conservative	A. J. Skinner	1,495	47.2	−0.2
Majority		175	5.6	+1.2
Turnout		3,165		
Labour gain from Conservative		Swing		

=== St. Mary's ===
St. Mary's
Party	Candidate	Votes	%	±%
Conservative	B. Gallimore	1,202	65.9	N/A
Liberal	H. German	623	34.1	N/A
Majority		579	31.8	
Turnout		1,825		
Conservative hold		Swing		

=== St. Paul's ===
St. Paul's
Party	Candidate	Votes	%	±%
Labour	P. Castle	823	58.0	+6.3
Conservative	S. Ritchie*	473	33.3	−15.0
Independent	W. J. Sheedy	124	8.7	N/A
Majority		350	24.7	+21.3
Turnout		1,420		
Labour gain from Conservative		Swing		

=== Sale Moor ===
Sale Moor
Party	Candidate	Votes	%	±%
Labour	B. Brotherton*	1,544	59.8	
Conservative	J. Hammond	921	35.7	
Communist	A. Burrage	116	4.5	
Majority		623	24.1	
Turnout		2,581		
Labour hold		Swing		
