= 1978 Trafford Metropolitan Borough Council election =

1978 UK local government election

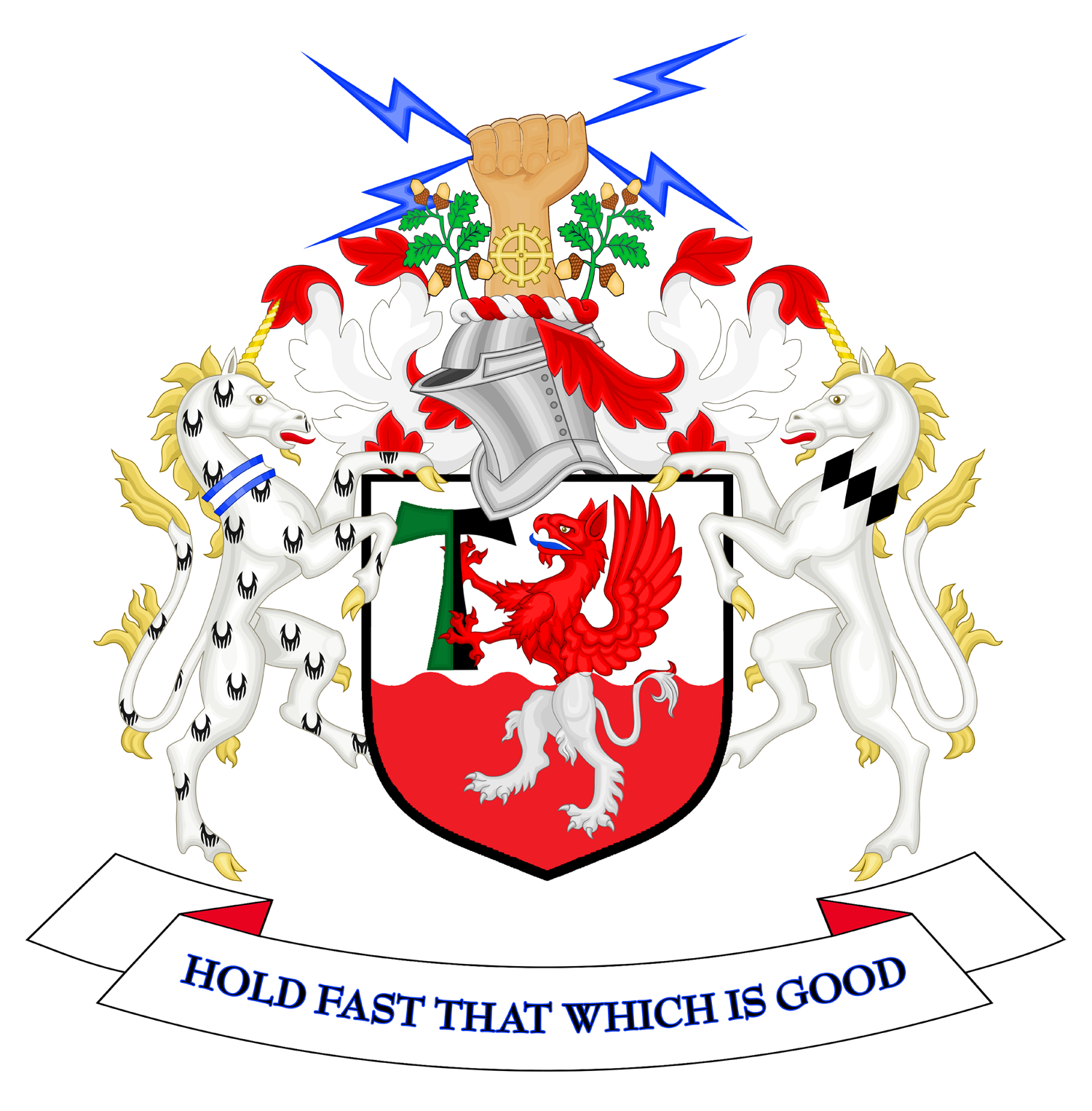
- 4 May 1978

23 of 63 seats to Trafford Metropolitan Borough Council 32 seats needed for a majority
	First party	Second party	Third party
Leader	Jonathan Taylor	Richard Mee	Brian Clancy
Party	Conservative	Labour	Liberal
Leader's seat	Brooklands	Sale Moor	Mersey-St. Mary's (stood down)
Last election	17 seats, 57.4%	4 seats, 27.3%	0 seats, 14.7%
Seats before	48	11	4
Seats won	19	4	0
Seats after	54	9	0
Seat change	▲6	▼2	▼4
Popular vote	40,050	19,076	9,180
Percentage	58.5%	27.9%	13.4%
Swing	▲1.1%	▲0.6%	▼1.3%
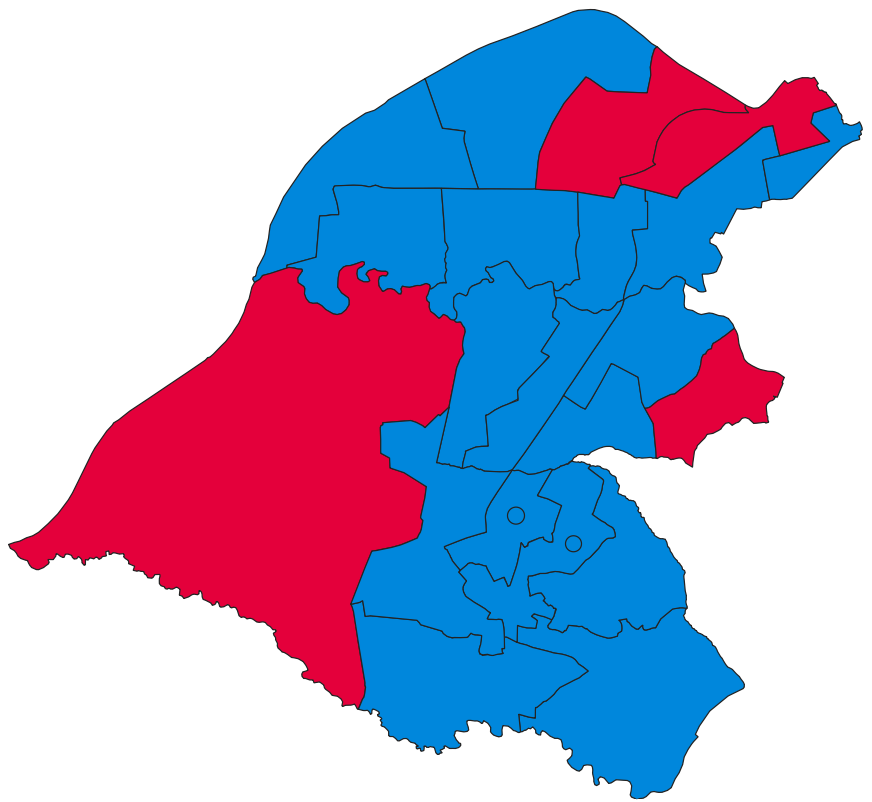
- Map of results of 1978 election
Leader of the Council before election
Mike King
Conservative
Leader of the Council after election
Jonathan Taylor
Conservative

Elections to Trafford Council were held on Thursday, 4 May 1978. One third of the council was up for election, with each successful candidate to serve a four-year term of office, expiring in 1982. The Conservative Party retained overall control of the council.

== Election result ==
Party	Votes		Seats			Full Council	
Conservative Party	40,050 (58.5%)	▲1.1	19 (82.6%)	19 / 23	▲6	54 (85.7%)	54 / 63
Labour Party	19,076 (27.9%)	▲0.6	4 (17.4%)	4 / 23	▼2	9 (14.3%)	9 / 63
Liberal Party	9,180 (13.4%)	▼1.3	0 (0.0%)	0 / 23	▼4	0 (0.0%)	0 / 63
Communist Party	136 (0.2%)	▼0.2	0 (0.0%)	0 / 23	0	0 (0.0%)	0 / 63

↓
9	54

== Ward results ==
=== No.1 (Altrincham South West) ===
Altrincham South West
Party	Candidate	Votes	%	±%
Conservative	Marshall Rubin	1,131	54.4	+0.9
Labour	E. McPherson	590	28.4	+1.6
Liberal	G. M. R. Willmott	357	17.2	−2.5
Majority		541	26.0	−0.7
Turnout		2,078	32.8	−7.5
Conservative gain from Labour		Swing		

=== No.2 (Altrincham East) ===
Altrincham East (2 vacancies)
Party	Candidate	Votes	%	±%
Conservative	Graham Burrows	1,993	58.2	+3.7
Conservative	H. Taylor	1,922	56.1	+1.6
Liberal	John Davenport*	1,126	32.9	+4.5
Liberal	Maureen Clancy	1,019	29.7	+1.3
Labour	J. R. Royle	402	11.7	−5.3
Labour	R. J. Ellis	394	11.5	−5.5
Majority		796	23.2	−2.9
Turnout		3,426	37.8	−4.8
Conservative gain from Liberal		Swing		
Conservative hold		Swing		

=== No.3 (Altrincham North) ===
Altrincham North (2 vacancies)
Party	Candidate	Votes	%	±%
Conservative	M. G. Currie*	1,264	57.3	+3.0
Conservative	L. M. L. Burton	1,187	53.8	−0.5
Labour	E. Smith	587	26.6	+5.2
Labour	G. R. Gould	542	24.6	+4.2
Liberal	Eric Faulkner	488	22.1	−2.2
Liberal	B. Gaylard	341	15.5	−8.8
Majority		600	27.2	−2.9
Turnout		2,205	35.5	+5.4
Conservative hold		Swing		
Conservative hold		Swing		

=== No.4 (Timperley) ===
Timperley
Party	Candidate	Votes	%	±%
Conservative	L. E. W. McCowatt	1,746	69.2	+21.6
Labour	C. Moore	777	30.8	+6.0
Majority		969	38.4	+18.4
Turnout		2,523	31.2	−13.3
Conservative hold		Swing		

=== No.5 (Mersey-St. Mary’s) ===
Mersey-St. Mary's
Party	Candidate	Votes	%	±%
Conservative	R. Moss	2,208	59.4	−1.4
Liberal	E. Critchlow	973	26.2	−3.2
Labour	C. Younghusband	534	14.4	+4.6
Majority		1,235	33.2	+1.7
Turnout		3,715	41.0	−4.0
Conservative gain from Liberal		Swing		

=== No.6 (St. Martin’s) ===
St. Martin's
Party	Candidate	Votes	%	±%
Conservative	Michael King*	2,543	62.9	−3.9
Labour	G. Woodburn	858	21.2	−12.0
Liberal	G. C. Kinsey	550	13.6	+13.6
Communist	J. E. Stitt	89	2.2	+2.2
Majority		1,685	41.7	+8.0
Turnout		4,040	35.3	−2.9
Conservative hold		Swing		

=== No.7 (Sale Moor) ===
Sale Moor
Party	Candidate	Votes	%	±%
Labour	Richard Mee*	1,417	52.5	+8.9
Conservative	Graham Toft	1,283	47.5	+3.6
Majority		134	5.0	+4.6
Turnout		2,700	40.9	−1.2
Labour hold		Swing		

=== No.8 (St. Anne’s) ===
St. Anne's
Party	Candidate	Votes	%	±%
Conservative	J. H. Evans	1,634	47.5	+1.1
Liberal	John Phillipson*	1,265	36.8	+5.5
Labour	Barry Brotherton	541	15.7	−6.6
Majority		369	10.7	−4.4
Turnout		3,440	40.4	−4.9
Conservative gain from Liberal		Swing		

=== No.9 (Brooklands) ===
Brooklands
Party	Candidate	Votes	%	±%
Conservative	John Waterfall	2,685	63.8	−1.0
Liberal	Cecil Fink*	1,098	26.1	−9.1
Labour	Alan Hadley	426	10.1	+10.1
Majority		1,587	37.7	+8.2
Turnout		4,209	47.1	+1.9
Conservative gain from Liberal		Swing		

=== No.10 (Talbot North) ===
Talbot North
Party	Candidate	Votes	%	±%
Labour	George Marland*	1,780	61.5	+8.7
Conservative	W. Outhwaite	1,113	38.5	+4.7
Majority		667	23.0	+4.0
Turnout		2,893	33.3	−4.6
Labour hold		Swing		

=== No.11 (Clifford) ===
Clifford
Party	Candidate	Votes	%	±%
Conservative	Keith Summerfield	1,319	50.1	+7.2
Labour	John Maher	1,318	50.0	+0.4
Majority		1	0.03	−6.7
Turnout		2,637	39.6	−1.9
Conservative gain from Labour		Swing		

=== No.12 (Longford) ===
Longford
Party	Candidate	Votes	%	±%
Conservative	David Homer*	1,886	53.7	+0.2
Labour	Tony Lloyd	1,284	36.5	+1.8
Liberal	H. D. Locksley	343	9.8	−1.9
Majority		602	17.1	−1.7
Turnout		3,513	34.4	−4.6
Conservative hold		Swing		

=== No.13 (Stretford) ===
Stretford
Party	Candidate	Votes	%	±%
Conservative	Margaret Hindley*	1,591	68.5	+4.1
Labour	Raymond Tully	732	31.5	+3.2
Majority		859	37.0	+0.9
Turnout		2,323	40.0	−2.3
Conservative hold		Swing		

=== No.14 (Park) ===
Park
Party	Candidate	Votes	%	±%
Labour	John Haydock	1,118	49.9	0.0
Conservative	L. Sherwood	1,076	48.0	+0.7
Communist	W. Hudson	47	2.1	−0.7
Majority		42	1.9	−0.7
Turnout		2,241	39.1	−4.2
Labour hold		Swing		

=== No.15 (Bowdon) ===
Bowdon
Party	Candidate	Votes	%	±%
Conservative	Jean Gill*	2,572	77.6	−7.1
Liberal	David Mardon	408	12.3	−3.0
Labour	G. R. Scott	333	10.1	+10.1
Majority		2,164	65.3	−4.0
Turnout		3,313	44.7	−3.9
Conservative hold		Swing		

=== No.16 (Hale) ===
Hale
Party	Candidate	Votes	%	±%
Conservative	Marjorie Hinchcliffe*	2,812	75.7	−11.5
Liberal	J. S. Whittingham	501	13.5	+13.5
Labour	Arthur Johnson	400	10.8	−2.0
Majority		2,311	62.2	−12.2
Turnout		3,713	39.9	−7.5
Conservative hold		Swing		

=== No.17 (Partington) ===
Partington
Party	Candidate	Votes	%	±%
Labour	Frank Holland*	1,566	60.0	+11.3
Conservative	J. Strong	1,043	40.0	−0.1
Majority		523	20.0	+11.3
Turnout		2,609	33.4	−4.0
Labour hold		Swing		

=== No.18 (Urmston West East) ===
Urmston West East
Party	Candidate	Votes	%	±%
Conservative	Allan Coupe*	1,725	58.8	+2.0
Labour	D. Horner	842	28.7	+4.6
Liberal	D. E. Unwin	367	12.5	−6.6
Majority		883	30.1	−2.6
Turnout		2,934	34.6	−3.0
Conservative hold		Swing		

=== No.19 (Flixton East Central) ===
Flixton East Central
Party	Candidate	Votes	%	±%
Conservative	William Wroe*	2,205	72.1	+9.2
Labour	J. Shaw	853	27.9	+5.3
Majority		1,352	44.2	+3.9
Turnout		3,058	33.2	−9.7
Conservative hold		Swing		

=== No.20 (Flixton West) ===
Flixton West
Party	Candidate	Votes	%	±%
Conservative	George Carnall*	2,291	62.6	+2.2
Labour	Laura Seex	1,370	37.4	+7.3
Majority		921	25.2	−5.1
Turnout		3,661	35.8	−5.4
Conservative hold		Swing		

=== No.21 (Davyhulme East) ===
Davyhulme East
Party	Candidate	Votes	%	±%
Conservative	Ray Haigh*	1,221	61.8	+1.9
Labour	R. P. F. Phillips	412	20.8	−9.6
Liberal	T. M. Owen	344	17.4	+7.7
Majority		809	40.9	+11.4
Turnout		1,977	36.7	−4.7
Conservative hold		Swing		
