= 1968 Sale Municipal Borough Council election =

Local election in Cheshire, England

← 1967	9 May 1968	1969 →

9 of 32 seats to Sale Municipal Borough Council 16 seats needed for a majority
	First party	Second party	Third party
Party	Conservative	Liberal	Labour
Last election	7 seats, 58.0%	0 seats, 14.6%	1 seats, 22.2%
Seats before	21	5	6
Seats won	9	0	0
Seats after	24	5	3
Seat change	▲3	Steady	▼3
Popular vote	10,132	3,983	3,529
Percentage	55.1%	21.7%	19.2%
Swing	▼2.9%	▲7.1%	▼3.0%
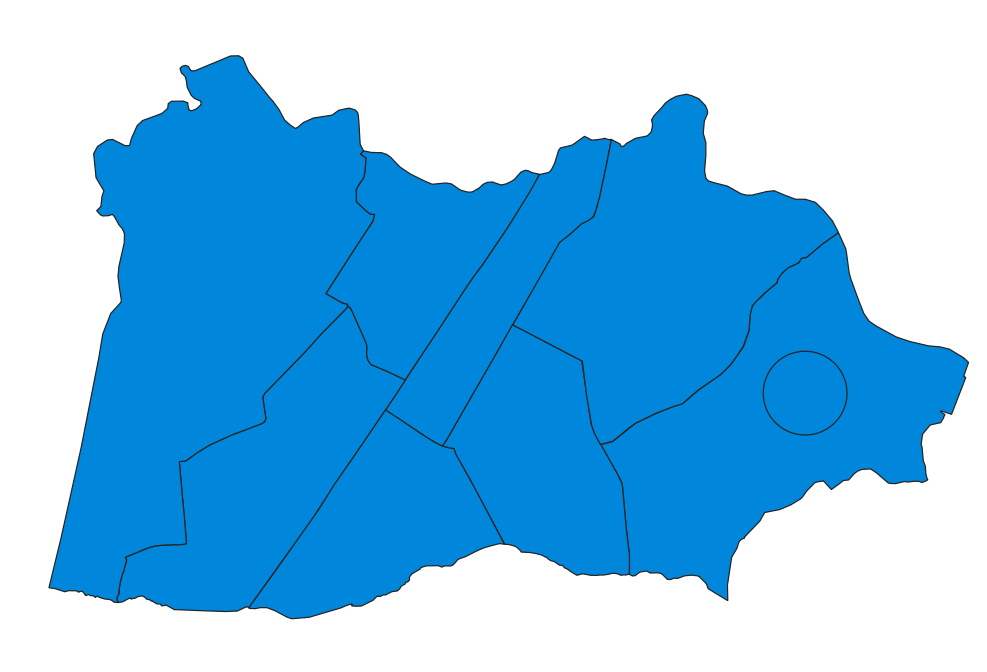
- Map of results of 1968 election
Leader of the Council before election
Conservative
Leader of the Council after election
Conservative

Elections to Sale Council were held on Thursday, 9 May 1968. One third of the councillors were up for election, with each successful candidate to serve a three-year term of office. The Conservative Party retained overall control of the council.

== Election result ==
Party	Votes		Seats			Full Council	
Conservative Party	10,132 (55.1%)	▼2.9	9 (100.0%)	9 / 9	▲3	24 (75.0%)	24 / 32
Liberal Party	3,983 (21.7%)	▲7.1	0 (0.0%)	0 / 9	Steady	5 (15.6%)	5 / 32
Labour Party	3,529 (19.2%)	▼3.0	0 (0.0%)	0 / 9	▼3	3 (9.4%)	3 / 32
Independent	530 (2.9%)	▼1.4	0 (0.0%)	0 / 9	Steady	0 (0.0%)	0 / 32
Communist Party	212 (1.2%)	▲0.4	0 (0.0%)	0 / 9	Steady	0 (0.0%)	0 / 32

=== Full council ===
↓
3	5	24

=== Aldermen ===
↓
1	4	3

=== Councillors ===
↓
2	1	21

== Ward results ==
=== Brooklands ===
Brooklands
Party	Candidate	Votes	%	±%
Conservative	J. G. Blakeway	1,158	64.7	−0.3
Liberal	W. J. Golding	633	35.3	+0.3
Majority		525	29.4	−0.6
Turnout		1,791		
Conservative hold		Swing		

=== Mersey ===
Mersey
Party	Candidate	Votes	%	±%
Conservative	V. S. Webb*	877	60.4	+6.0
Liberal	J. B. Sullivan	575	39.6	+23.9
Majority		302	20.8	−3.7
Turnout		1,452		
Conservative hold		Swing		

=== St. Anne's ===
St. Anne's
Party	Candidate	Votes	%	±%
Conservative	F. S. Laughton*	1,248	58.6	−10.3
Liberal	A. Ashcroft	880	41.4	N/A
Majority		368	17.2	−20.6
Turnout		2,128		
Conservative hold		Swing		

=== St. John's ===
St. John's
Party	Candidate	Votes	%	±%
Conservative	K. Orton*	1,325	68.2	+9.4
Liberal	E. H. Faulkner	619	31.8	−9.4
Majority		706	36.4	+18.8
Turnout		1,944		
Conservative hold		Swing		

=== St. Martin's ===
St. Martin's
Party	Candidate	Votes	%	±%
Conservative	P. A. G. Morgan Evans	1,730	54.7	−3.8
Labour	W. Munro	1,432	45.3	+3.8
Majority		298	9.4	−7.6
Turnout		3,162		
Conservative hold		Swing		

=== St. Mary's ===
St. Mary's
Party	Candidate	Votes	%	±%
Conservative	J. Pollard*	1,160	68.6	−9.3
Independent	M. Brown	530	31.4	+20.2
Majority		630	37.2	−29.5
Turnout		1,690		
Conservative hold		Swing		

=== St. Paul's ===
St. Paul's
Party	Candidate	Votes	%	±%
Conservative	H. Rigby	707	56.3	+1.6
Labour	T. A. Winnington*	549	43.7	−1.6
Majority		158	12.6	+3.3
Turnout		1,256		
Conservative gain from Labour		Swing		

=== Sale Moor ===
Sale Moor (2 vacancies)
Party	Candidate	Votes	%	±%
Conservative	A. E. Thompson	981	19.8	
Conservative	M. A. Hood	946	19.1	
Labour	G. Ewing*	795	16.0	
Labour	A. Z. Keller	753	15.2	
Liberal	V. A. M. Flynn	638	12.9	
Liberal	A. Roberts	638	12.9	
Communist	A. Burrage	118	2.4	
Communist	B. Panter	94	1.9	
Majority		151	3.1	
Turnout		4,963		
Conservative gain from Labour		Swing		
Conservative gain from Labour		Swing		
