= 1966 Sale Municipal Borough Council election =

Local election in Cheshire, England

← 1965	12 May 1966	1967 →

9 of 32 seats to Sale Municipal Borough Council 16 seats needed for a majority
	First party	Second party	Third party
Party	Conservative	Labour	Liberal
Last election	7 seats, 43.6%	3 seats, 27.0%	0 seats, 29.4%
Seats before	17	7	8
Seats won	7	2	1
Seats after	18	8	6
Seat change	▲1	▲1	▼2
Popular vote	9,367	4,024	4,516
Percentage	52.3%	22.5%	25.2%
Swing	▲8.7%	▼4.5%	▼4.2%
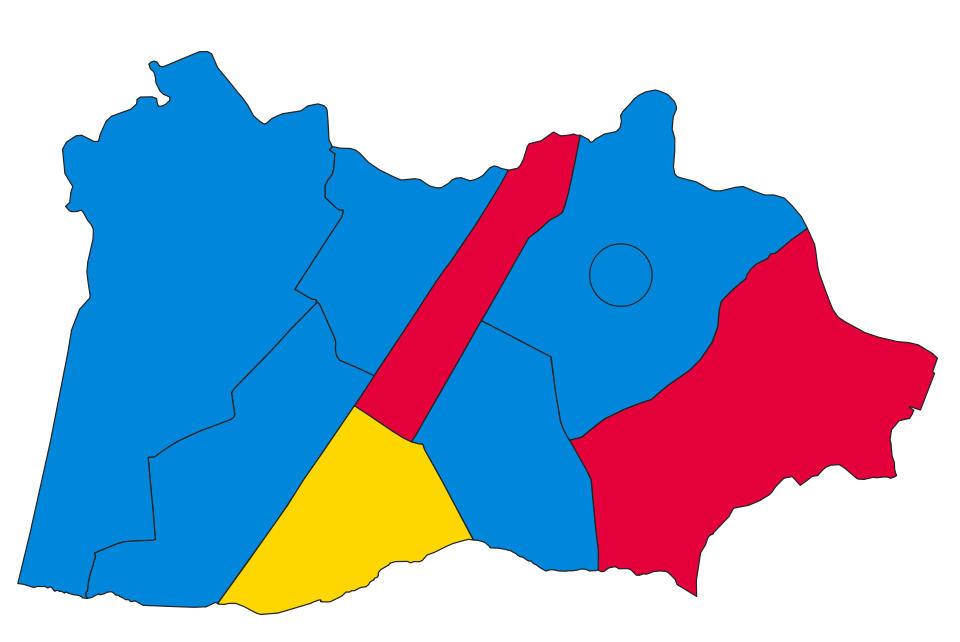
- Map of results of 1966 election
Leader of the Council before election
Conservative
Leader of the Council after election
Conservative

Elections to Sale Council were held on Thursday, 12 May 1966. One third of the councillors were up for election, with each successful candidate to serve a three-year term of office. The Conservative Party retained overall control of the council.

== Election result ==
Party	Votes		Seats			Full Council	
Conservative Party	9,367 (52.3%)	▲8.7	7 (77.8%)	7 / 9	▲1	18 (56.3%)	18 / 32
Labour Party	4,024 (22.5%)	▼4.5	2 (22.2%)	2 / 9	▲1	8 (25.0%)	8 / 32
Liberal Party	4,516 (25.2%)	▼4.2	1 (11.1%)	1 / 9	▼2	6 (18.8%)	6 / 32

=== Full council ===
↓
8	6	18

=== Aldermen ===
↓
1	4	3

=== Councillors ===
↓
7	2	15

== Ward results ==
=== Brooklands ===
Brooklands
Party	Candidate	Votes	%	±%
Liberal	P. W. Croft*	882	50.6	+18.6
Conservative	F. Hewitt	862	49.4	−10.6
Majority		20	1.2	
Turnout		1,744		
Liberal hold		Swing		

=== Mersey ===
Mersey
Party	Candidate	Votes	%	±%
Conservative	R. P. Bannister*	875	47.6	−4.6
Labour	A. Z. Keller	681	37.1	+7.1
Liberal	J. E. Thorner	282	15.3	−2.4
Majority		194	10.5	−11.8
Turnout		1,838		
Conservative hold		Swing		

=== St. Anne's ===
St. Anne's (2 vacancies)
Party	Candidate	Votes	%	±%
Conservative	S. C. Swann	1,188	28.8	
Conservative	G. Thornton	1,151	28.0	
Liberal	E. M. Parker	903	21.9	
Liberal	J. B. Sullivan*	876	21.3	
Majority		248	6.1	
Turnout		4,118		
Conservative gain from Liberal		Swing		
Conservative hold		Swing		

=== St. John's ===
St. John's
Party	Candidate	Votes	%	±%
Conservative	W. K. Tedham*	1,027	56.4	
Liberal	J. Cooper	794	43.6	
Majority		233	12.8	
Turnout		1,821		
Conservative hold		Swing		

=== St. Martin's ===
St. Martin's
Party	Candidate	Votes	%	±%
Conservative	R. L. Heath*	1,860	61.1	+12.9
Labour	A. Wilkinson	1,182	38.9	+8.6
Majority		678	22.3	+4.4
Turnout		3,042		
Conservative hold		Swing		

=== St. Mary's ===
St. Mary's
Party	Candidate	Votes	%	±%
Conservative	G. Russell*	1,288	81.1	+22.2
Labour	A. Mackie	301	18.9	+11.2
Majority		987	62.1	+36.6
Turnout		1,589		
Conservative hold		Swing		

=== St. Paul's ===
St. Paul's
Party	Candidate	Votes	%	±%
Labour	E. P. Mellor*	674	55.4	
Conservative	B. Oldfield	542	44.6	
Majority		132	10.9	
Turnout		1,216		
Labour hold		Swing		

=== Sale Moor ===
Sale Moor
Party	Candidate	Votes	%	±%
Labour	R. Harris	1,186	46.7	−5.9
Liberal	V. A. M. Flynn*	779	30.7	−16.7
Conservative	G. Yates	574	22.6	N/A
Majority		407	16.0	+10.8
Turnout		2,539		
Labour gain from Liberal		Swing		
