= 1972 Sale Municipal Borough Council election =

Local election in Cheshire, England

← 1971	4 May 1972	1973 Trafford →

8 of 32 seats to Sale Municipal Borough Council 16 seats needed for a majority
	First party	Second party	Third party
Party	Conservative	Labour	Liberal
Last election	3 seats, 45.8%	3 seats, 27.9%	2 seats, 25.0%
Seats before	18	9	5
Seats won	4	2	2
Seats after	16	10	6
Seat change	▼2	▲1	▲1
Popular vote	8,647	4,896	4,013
Percentage	48.8%	27.6%	22.6%
Swing	▲3.0%	▼0.3%	▼2.4%
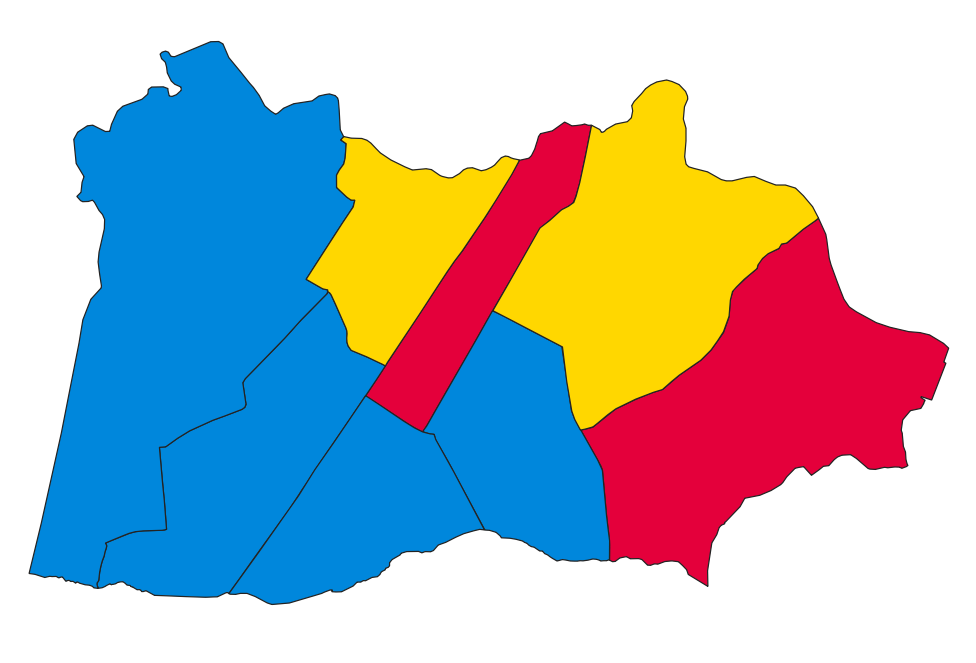
- Map of results of 1972 election
Leader of the Council before election
Conservative
Leader of the Council after election
Conservative

Elections to Sale Council were held on Thursday, 4 May 1972. One third of the councillors were up for election, with each successful candidate to serve a two-year term of office. These were the final elections held in Sale before it became part of Trafford. The Conservative Party retained overall control of the council.

== Election result ==
Party	Votes		Seats			Full Council	
Conservative Party	8,647 (48.8%)	▲3.0	4 (50.0%)	4 / 8	▼2	16 (50.0%)	16 / 32
Labour Party	4,896 (27.6%)	▼0.3	2 (25.0%)	2 / 8	▲1	10 (31.3%)	10 / 32
Liberal Party	4,013 (22.6%)	▼2.4	2 (25.0%)	2 / 8	▲1	6 (18.8%)	6 / 32
Communist Party	166 (0.9%)	▲0.2	0 (0.0%)	0 / 8	Steady	0 (0.0%)	0 / 32

=== Full council ===
↓
10	6	16

=== Aldermen ===
↓
2	6

=== Councillors ===
↓
8	6	10

== Ward results ==
=== Brooklands ===
Brooklands
Party	Candidate	Votes	%	±%
Conservative	J. G. Blakeway	1,068	48.3	+4.7
Liberal	S. Evans	876	39.7	−5.0
Labour	P. Ashbourn	265	12.0	+0.3
Majority		192	8.6	
Turnout		2,209		
Conservative gain from Liberal		Swing		

=== Mersey ===
Mersey
Party	Candidate	Votes	%	±%
Liberal	K. F. Humber	1,037	55.8	−1.2
Conservative	J. M. Parkins*	743	40.0	−3.0
Communist	B. Panter	78	4.2	N/A
Majority		294	15.8	+1.8
Turnout		1,858		
Liberal gain from Conservative		Swing		

=== St. Anne's ===
St. Anne's
Party	Candidate	Votes	%	±%
Liberal	J. Phillipson	997	39.2	+3.2
Conservative	J. E. Peet*	993	39.0	−1.7
Labour	M. Rose	555	21.8	−1.5
Majority		4	0.2	
Turnout		2,545		
Liberal gain from Conservative		Swing		

=== St. John's ===
St. John's
Party	Candidate	Votes	%	±%
Conservative	W. K. Tedham*	1,014	53.4	−6.0
Liberal	A. G. Priestner	885	46.6	+6.0
Majority		129	6.8	−12.0
Turnout		1899		
Conservative hold		Swing		

=== St. Martin's ===
St. Martin's
Party	Candidate	Votes	%	±%
Conservative	S. G. Brownhill*	1,794	54.7	+7.5
Labour	G. Naggs	1,488	45.3	−7.5
Majority		306	9.4	
Turnout		3,282		
Conservative hold		Swing		

=== St. Mary's ===
St. Mary's
Party	Candidate	Votes	%	±%
Conservative	I. Hurst	1,430	83.3	+17.2
Labour	E. Wollaston	287	16.7	N/A
Majority		1,143	66.6	+34.8
Turnout		1,717		
Conservative hold		Swing		

=== St. Paul's ===
St. Paul's
Party	Candidate	Votes	%	±%
Labour	K. Walton*	745	52.0	−6.0
Conservative	S. A. Elder	470	32.8	−0.5
Liberal	J. Keohane	218	15.2	N/A
Majority		275	19.2	−5.2
Turnout		1,433		
Labour hold		Swing		

=== Sale Moor ===
Sale Moor
Party	Candidate	Votes	%	±%
Labour	E. McPherson	1,556	56.0	−3.8
Conservative	J. Hammond	1,135	40.8	+5.1
Communist	A. Burrage	88	3.2	−1.3
Majority		421	15.2	−8.9
Turnout		2,779		
Labour gain from Conservative		Swing		
