= 1969 Sale Municipal Borough Council election =

Local election in Cheshire, England

← 1968	8 May 1969	1970 →

9 of 32 seats to Sale Municipal Borough Council 16 seats needed for a majority
	First party	Second party	Third party
Party	Conservative	Liberal	Labour
Last election	9 seats, 55.1%	0 seats, 21.7%	0 seats, 29.2%
Seats before	25	4	3
Seats won	7	1	1
Seats after	25	4	3
Seat change	Steady	Steady	Steady
Popular vote	8,551	4,547	1,725
Percentage	57.3%	30.5%	11.6%
Swing	▲2.2%	▲8.8%	▼7.6%
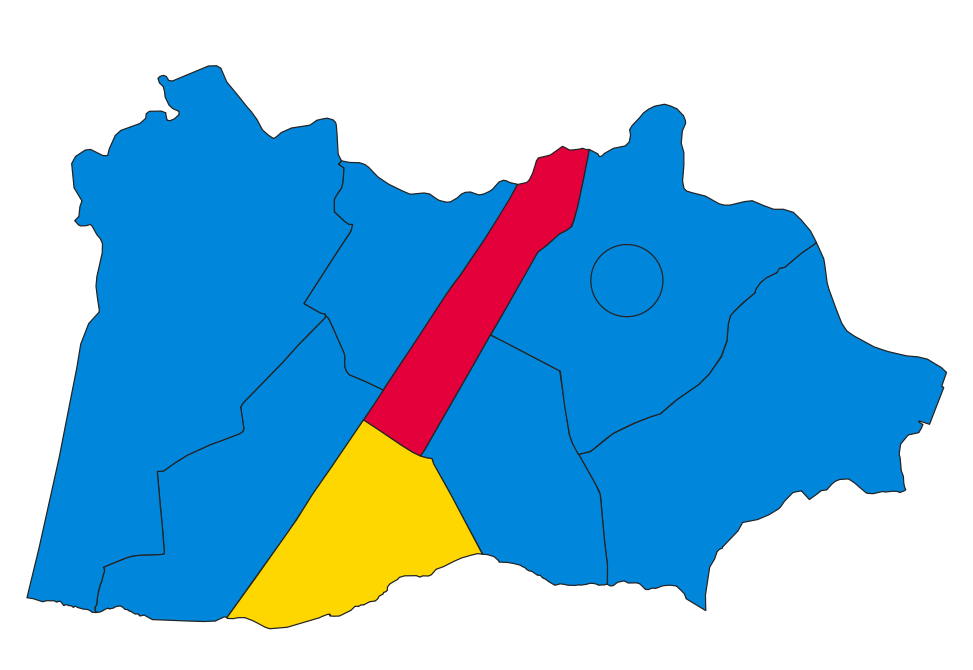
- Map of results of 1969 election
Leader of the Council before election
Conservative
Leader of the Council after election
Conservative

Elections to Sale Council were held on Thursday, 8 May 1969. One third of the councillors were up for election, with each successful candidate to serve a three-year term of office. The Conservative Party retained overall control of the council.

== Election result ==
Party	Votes		Seats			Full Council	
Conservative Party	8,551 (57.3%)	▲2.2	7 (77.8%)	7 / 9	Steady	25 (78.1%)	25 / 32
Liberal Party	4,547 (30.5%)	▲8.8	1 (11.1%)	1 / 9	Steady	4 (12.5%)	4 / 32
Labour Party	1,725 (11.6%)	▼7.6	1 (11.1%)	1 / 9	Steady	3 (9.4%)	3 / 32
Communist Party	88 (0.6%)	▼0.6	0 (0.0%)	0 / 9	Steady	0 (0.0%)	0 / 32

=== Full council ===
↓
3	4	25

=== Aldermen ===
↓
1	3	4

=== Councillors ===
↓
2	1	21

== Ward results ==
=== Brooklands ===
Brooklands
Party	Candidate	Votes	%	±%
Liberal	P. W. Croft*	1,034	54.9	+19.6
Conservative	P. J. A. Parnacott	850	45.1	−19.6
Majority		184	9.8	
Turnout		1,884		
Liberal hold		Swing		

=== Mersey ===
Mersey
Party	Candidate	Votes	%	±%
Conservative	R. P. Bannister*	956	60.2	−0.2
Liberal	R. L. Dallow	631	39.8	+0.2
Majority		325	20.4	−0.4
Turnout		1,587		
Conservative hold		Swing		

=== St. Anne's ===
St. Anne's (2 vacancies)
Party	Candidate	Votes	%	±%
Conservative	J. E. Peet	1,234	29.4	
Conservative	L. C. Finch	1,210	28.9	
Liberal	A. M. Marshall	900	21.5	
Liberal	W. J. Golding	850	20.3	
Majority		310	7.4	
Turnout		4,194		
Conservative hold		Swing		
Conservative hold		Swing		

=== St. John's ===
St. John's
Party	Candidate	Votes	%	±%
Conservative	W. K. Tedham*	1,292	63.4	−4.8
Liberal	J. D. Moss	747	36.6	+4.8
Majority		545	26.7	−9.7
Turnout		2,039		
Conservative hold		Swing		

=== St. Martin's ===
St. Martin's
Party	Candidate	Votes	%	±%
Conservative	S. G. Brownhill	1,987	66.9	+12.2
Labour	A. P. Williams	982	33.1	−12.2
Majority		1,005	33.8	+24.4
Turnout		2,969		
Conservative hold		Swing		

=== St. Mary's ===
St. Mary's
Party	Candidate	Votes	%	±%
Conservative	G. Russell*	uncontested		
Conservative hold		Swing		

=== St. Paul's ===
St. Paul's
Party	Candidate	Votes	%	±%
Labour	E. P. Mellor*	uncontested		
Labour hold		Swing		

=== Sale Moor ===
Sale Moor
Party	Candidate	Votes	%	±%
Conservative	M. A. Hood*	1,022	45.7	
Labour	A. Z. Keller	743	33.2	
Liberal	H. F. Jarvis	385	17.2	
Communist	A. Burrage	88	3.9	
Majority		279	12.5	
Turnout		2,238		
Conservative hold		Swing		

== By-elections between 1969 and 1970 ==
St. Mary's By-election 30 October 1969
Party	Candidate	Votes	%	±%
Conservative	G. Vickers	972	56.6	N/A
Liberal	P. Stock	745	43.4	N/A
Majority		227	13.2	
Turnout		1,717		
Conservative hold		Swing		
