= 1970 Sale Municipal Borough Council election =

Local election in Cheshire, England

← 1969	7 May 1970	1971 →

11 of 32 seats to Sale Municipal Borough Council 16 seats needed for a majority
	First party	Second party	Third party
Party	Conservative	Labour	Liberal
Last election	7 seats, 57.3%	1 seats, 11.6%	1 seats, 30.5%
Seats before	27	3	2
Seats won	5	4	2
Seats after	22	6	4
Seat change	▼5	▲3	▲2
Popular vote	9,972	5,875	4,392
Percentage	48.9%	28.8%	21.5%
Swing	▼8.4%	▲17.2%	▼9.0%
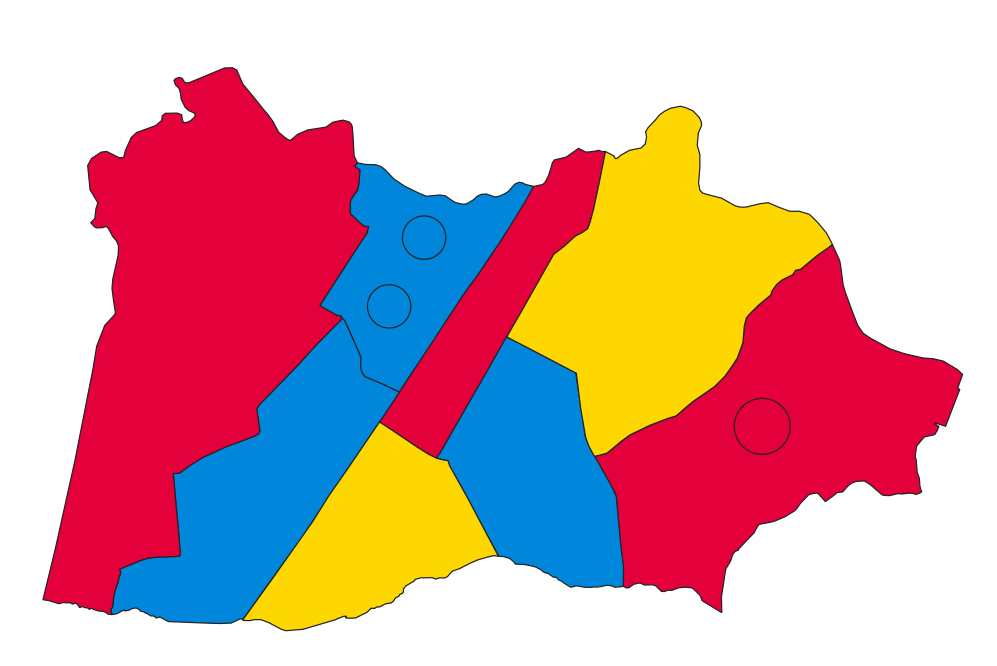
- Map of results of 1970 election
Leader of the Council before election
Conservative
Leader of the Council after election
Conservative

Elections to Sale Council were held on Thursday, 7 May 1970. One third of the councillors were up for election, with each successful candidate to serve a three-year term of office. The Conservative Party retained overall control of the council.

== Election result ==
Party	Votes		Seats			Full Council	
Conservative Party	9,972 (48.9%)	▼8.4	5 (45.5%)	5 / 11	▼5	22 (68.8%)	22 / 32
Labour Party	5,875 (28.8%)	▲17.2	4 (36.4%)	4 / 11	▲3	6 (18.8%)	6 / 32
Liberal Party	4,392 (21.5%)	▼9.0	2 (18.2%)	2 / 11	▲2	4 (12.5%)	4 / 32
Communist Party	161 (0.8%)	▲0.2	0 (0.0%)	0 / 11	Steady	0 (0.0%)	0 / 32

=== Full council ===
↓
6	4	22

=== Aldermen ===
↓
1	1	6

=== Councillors ===
↓
5	3	16

== Ward results ==
=== Brooklands ===
Brooklands
Party	Candidate	Votes	%	±%
Liberal	M. Horlock	998	51.2	−3.7
Conservative	R. J. Shepherd	951	48.8	+3.7
Majority		47	2.4	−7.4
Turnout		1,949		
Liberal gain from Conservative		Swing		

=== Mersey ===
Mersey (3 vacancies)
Party	Candidate	Votes	%	±%
Conservative	J. L. Ferguson*	948	52.4	−7.8
Conservative	J. M. Parkins	895	49.5	−10.7
Conservative	I. H. Hurst	877	48.5	−11.7
Liberal	C. S. Fink	680	37.6	−2.2
Liberal	R. L. Dallow	565	31.2	−8.6
Liberal	A. Howarth	530	29.3	−10.5
Labour	A. Z. Keller	328	18.1	N/A
Labour	E. McPherson	302	16.7	N/A
Labour	T. Palmer	290	16.0	N/A
Majority		197	10.9	−9.5
Turnout		1,809	48.2	
Conservative hold		Swing		
Conservative hold		Swing		
Conservative hold		Swing		

=== St. Anne's ===
St. Anne's
Party	Candidate	Votes	%	±%
Liberal	W. J. Golding	990	50.3	
Conservative	L. C. Finch*	980	49.7	
Majority		10	0.6	
Turnout		1,970		
Liberal gain from Conservative		Swing		

=== St. John's ===
St. John's
Party	Candidate	Votes	%	±%
Conservative	A. S. Long	1,183	55.5	−7.9
Liberal	J. D. Moss	629	29.5	−7.1
Labour	R. Lee	320	15.0	N/A
Majority		554	26.0	−0.7
Turnout		2,132		
Conservative hold		Swing		

=== St. Martin's ===
St. Martin's
Party	Candidate	Votes	%	±%
Labour	W. Munro	1,611	52.2	+19.1
Conservative	J. Lewis*	1,478	47.8	−19.1
Majority		133	4.4	
Turnout		3,089		
Labour gain from Conservative		Swing		

=== St. Mary's ===
St. Mary's
Party	Candidate	Votes	%	±%
Conservative	H. Jackson*	uncontested		
Conservative hold		Swing		

St. Paul's
Party	Candidate	Votes	%	±%
Labour	J. Aston	760	51.7	N/A
Conservative	G. A. Banner*	710	48.3	N/A
Majority		50	3.4	
Turnout		1,470		
Labour gain from Conservative		Swing		

=== Sale Moor ===
Sale Moor (2 vacancies)
Party	Candidate	Votes	%	±%
Labour	R. Mee*	1,211	27.7	
Labour	B. Brotherton	1,053	24.1	
Conservative	M. Sanders	977	22.3	
Conservative	J. Woodward	973	22.2	
Communist	A. Burrage	161	3.7	
Majority		76	1.7	
Turnout		4,375		
Labour hold		Swing		
Labour gain from Conservative		Swing		

== By-elections between 1970 and 1971 ==
St. Paul's By-election 17 September 1970
Party	Candidate	Votes	%	±%
Labour	K. Walton	516	43.5	−8.2
Conservative	J. Plumbley	462	39.0	−9.3
Liberal	C. S. Fink	280	23.6	N/A
Majority		54	4.6	+1.2
Turnout		1,186		
Labour hold		Swing		
