= 1965 Sale Municipal Borough Council election =

Local election in Cheshire, England

← 1964	13 May 1965	1966 →

10 of 32 seats to Sale Municipal Borough Council 16 seats needed for a majority
	First party	Second party	Third party
Party	Conservative	Liberal	Labour
Last election	4 seats, 34.1%	1 seats, 42.4%	3 seats, 21.2%
Seats before	11	14	7
Seats won	7	0	3
Seats after	17	8	7
Seat change	▲6	▼6	Steady
Popular vote	8,698	5,863	5,381
Percentage	43.6%	29.4%	27.0%
Swing	▲9.5%	▼13.0%	▲5.8%
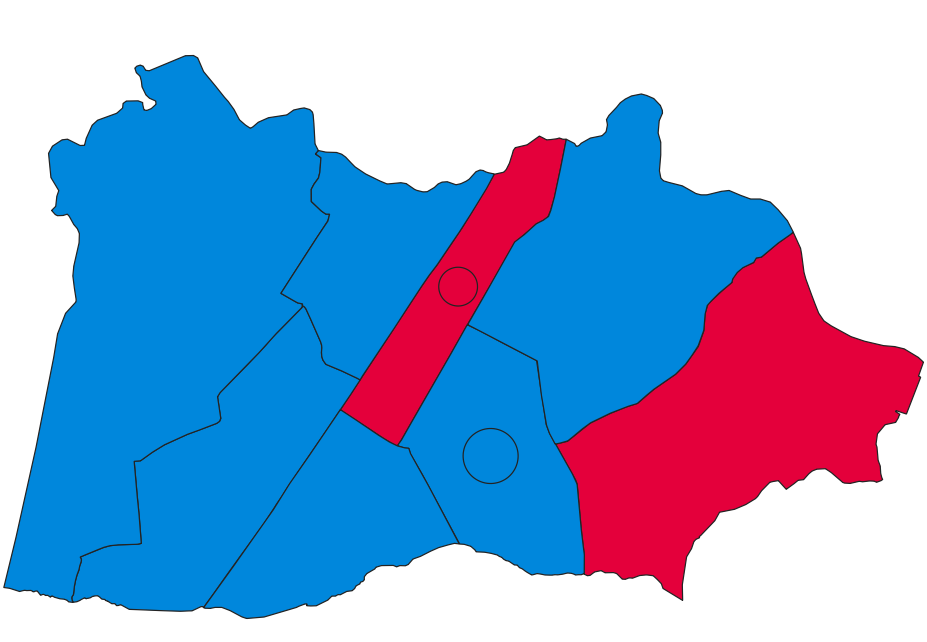
- Map of results of 1965 election
Leader of the Council before election
No overall control
Leader of the Council after election
Conservative

Elections to Sale Council were held on Thursday, 13 May 1965. One third of the councillors were up for election, with each successful candidate to serve a three-year term of office. The Conservative Party gained overall control of the council, from no overall control.

== Election result ==
Party	Votes		Seats			Full Council	
Conservative Party	8,698 (43.6%)	▲9.5	7 (70.0%)	7 / 10	▲6	17 (53.1%)	17 / 32
Liberal Party	5,863 (29.4%)	▼13.0	0 (0.0%)	0 / 10	▼6	8 (25.0%)	8 / 32
Labour Party	5,381 (27.0%)	▲5.8	3 (30.0%)	3 / 10	Steady	7 (21.9%)	7 / 32

=== Full council ===
↓
7	8	17

=== Aldermen ===
↓
1	4	3

=== Councillors ===
↓
6	4	14

== Ward results ==
=== Brooklands ===
Brooklands
Party	Candidate	Votes	%	±%
Conservative	P. A. A. Pepper	1,129	60.0	+6.7
Liberal	R. L. Russell	603	32.0	−14.7
Labour	M. G. Whipp	150	8.0	N/A
Majority		526	28.0	+21.4
Turnout		1,882		
Conservative gain from Liberal		Swing		

=== Mersey ===
Mersey
Party	Candidate	Votes	%	±%
Conservative	V. S. Webb*	961	52.3	+10.8
Labour	A. Z. Keller	552	30.0	+0.1
Liberal	I. A. Nicholls	324	17.7	−10.9
Majority		409	22.3	+10.7
Turnout		1,837		
Conservative hold		Swing		

=== St. Anne's ===
St. Anne's
Party	Candidate	Votes	%	±%
Conservative	S. P. Harris	1,344	57.3	+12.9
Liberal	E. M. Parker*	702	29.9	−11.5
Labour	A. Whipp	301	12.8	N/A
Majority		642	27.4	+24.4
Turnout		2,347		
Conservative gain from Liberal		Swing		

=== St. John's ===
St. John's (2 vacancies)
Party	Candidate	Votes	%	±%
Conservative	K. Orton	1,229	27.5	
Conservative	W. K. Tedham	1,145	25.6	
Liberal	J. Cooper*	702	15.7	
Liberal	D. R. James	676	15.1	
Labour	R. Harris	403	9.0	
Labour	T. F. Palmer	315	7.1	
Majority		443	9.9	
Turnout		4,470		
Conservative gain from Liberal		Swing		
Conservative gain from Liberal		Swing		

=== St. Martin's ===
St. Martin's
Party	Candidate	Votes	%	±%
Conservative	V. Hickman	1,604	48.2	N/A
Labour	A. Wilkinson	1,007	30.3	N/A
Liberal	R. Lee*	717	21.5	N/A
Majority		597	17.9	
Turnout		3,328		
Conservative gain from Liberal		Swing		

=== St. Mary's ===
St. Mary's
Party	Candidate	Votes	%	±%
Conservative	J. Pollard	1,286	58.9	+4.8
Liberal	G. A. Mitchell*	730	33.4	−3.3
Labour	A. Mackie	169	7.7	−3.5
Majority		556	25.5	+8.1
Turnout		2,185		
Conservative gain from Liberal		Swing		

=== St. Paul's ===
St. Paul's (2 vacancies)
Party	Candidate	Votes	%	±%
Labour	T. A. Winnington*	624	41.0	
Labour	J. Aston	613	40.3	
Liberal	W. R. Worsley	285	18.7	
Majority		328	21.6	
Turnout		1,522		
Labour hold		Swing		
Labour hold		Swing		

=== Sale Moor ===
Sale Moor
Party	Candidate	Votes	%	±%
Labour	G. Ewing*	1,247	52.6	−0.3
Liberal	R. J. Maxim	1,124	47.4	+0.3
Majority		123	5.2	−0.6
Turnout		2,371		
Labour hold		Swing		
