= 1964 Sale Municipal Borough Council election =

Local election in Cheshire, England

← 1963	7 May 1964	1965 →

8 of 32 seats to Sale Municipal Borough Council 16 seats needed for a majority
	First party	Second party	Third party
Party	Liberal	Conservative	Labour
Last election	5 seats, 48.4%	2 seats, 32.4%	1 seats, 19.3%
Seats before	16	11	5
Seats won	1	4	3
Seats after	13	13	6
Seat change	▼3	▲2	▲1
Popular vote	5,789	4,659	2,888
Percentage	42.4%	34.1%	21.2%
Swing	▼6.0%	▲1.7%	▲1.9%
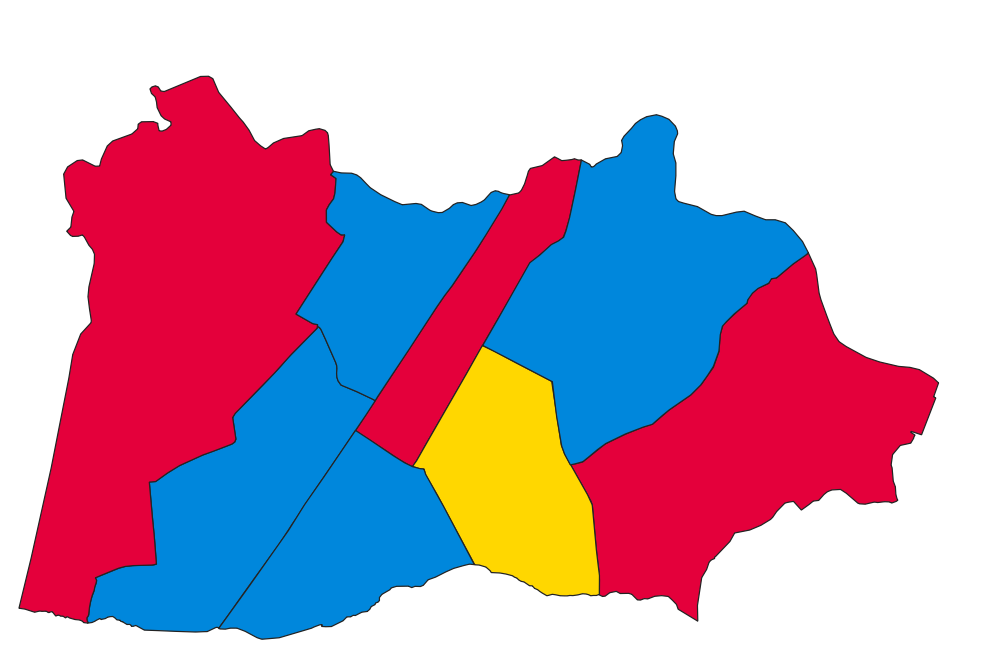
- Map of results of 1964 election
Leader of the Council before election
Liberal
Leader of the Council after election
No overall control

Elections to Sale Council were held on Thursday, 7 May 1964. One third of the councillors were up for election, with each successful candidate to serve a three-year term of office. The Liberal Party lost overall control of the council.

== Election result ==
Party	Votes		Seats			Full Council	
Liberal Party	5,789 (42.4%)	▼6.0	1 (12.5%)	1 / 8	▼3	13 (40.6%)	13 / 32
Conservative Party	4,659 (34.1%)	▲1.7	4 (50.0%)	4 / 8	▲2	13 (40.6%)	13 / 32
Labour Party	2,888 (21.2%)	▲1.9	3 (37.5%)	3 / 8	▲1	6 (18.8%)	6 / 32
Independent	313 (2.3%)	N/A	0 (0.0%)	0 / 8	N/A	0 (0.0%)	0 / 32

=== Full council ===
↓
6	13	13

=== Aldermen ===
↓
1	7

=== Councillors ===
↓
5	13	6

== Ward results ==
=== Brooklands ===
Brooklands
Party	Candidate	Votes	%	±%
Conservative	W. Daniel	997	53.3	+6.0
Liberal	W. D. Penfold	875	46.7	−6.0
Majority		122	6.6	
Turnout		1,872		
Conservative hold		Swing		

=== Mersey ===
Mersey
Party	Candidate	Votes	%	±%
Conservative	P. J. Hamilton	782	41.5	−0.6
Labour	A. Whipp	563	29.9	N/A
Liberal	I. A. Nicholls	538	28.6	−29.3
Majority		219	11.6	
Turnout		1,883		
Conservative gain from Liberal		Swing		

=== St. Anne's ===
St. Anne's
Party	Candidate	Votes	%	±%
Conservative	F. S. Laughton	976	44.4	+2.5
Liberal	E. Hodkinson	910	41.4	−14.7
Independent	H. L. Wilson	313	14.2	N/A
Majority		66	3.0	
Turnout		2,199		
Conservative gain from Liberal		Swing		

=== St. John's ===
St. John's
Party	Candidate	Votes	%	±%
Liberal	E. D. Salem*	1,039	58.5	+1.9
Conservative	K. Orton	736	41.5	+3.1
Majority		303	17.0	−1.3
Turnout		1,775		
Liberal hold		Swing		

=== St. Martin's ===
St. Martin's
Party	Candidate	Votes	%	±%
Labour	W. Munro*	uncontested		
Labour hold		Swing		

=== St. Mary's ===
St. Mary's
Party	Candidate	Votes	%	±%
Conservative	H. Jackson	1,168	54.1	+4.9
Liberal	R. Prenton	791	36.7	−2.9
Labour	G. Ewing	198	11.2	−2.0
Majority		377	17.4	+7.8
Turnout		2,157		
Conservative hold		Swing		

=== St. Paul's ===
St. Paul's
Party	Candidate	Votes	%	±%
Labour	S. Orme*	841	63.2	+7.8
Liberal	J. Cooper	490	36.8	−7.8
Majority		351	26.4	+15.6
Turnout		1,331		
Labour hold		Swing		

=== Sale Moor ===
Sale Moor
Party	Candidate	Votes	%	±%
Labour	R. Mee	1,286	52.9	+11.1
Liberal	R. C. Ankers	1,146	47.1	−11.1
Majority		140	5.8	
Turnout		2,432		
Labour gain from Liberal		Swing		

== Aldermanic election ==
Aldermanic elections took place at the first council meeting on 19 May 1964, four of the borough's aldermen were up for election by the council.

Sale Municipal Borough Aldermanic election
Party	Candidate	Votes	%	±%
Liberal	R. Newton	13	54.2	
Liberal	C. S. Fink	12	50.0	
Liberal	A. Howarth	12	50.0	
Liberal	E. D. Salem	12	50.0	
Conservative	S. P. Harris*	10	41.7	
Conservative	R. P. Bannister*	8	33.3	
Conservative	J. G. Steel*	8	33.3	
Conservative	F. D. Gee*	7	29.2	
Majority		2	8.3	
Turnout		24		
Liberal gain from Conservative		Swing		
Liberal gain from Conservative		Swing		
Liberal gain from Conservative		Swing		
Liberal gain from Conservative		Swing		

== By-elections between 1964 and 1965 ==
Mersey By-election 18 June 1964 (2 vacancies)
Party	Candidate	Votes	%	±%
Conservative	R. P. Bannister	846	24.7	
Conservative	V. S. Webb	796	23.2	
Labour	A. Whipp	544	15.9	
Labour	A. Wilkinson	500	14.6	
Liberal	I. A. Nicholls	394	11.5	
Liberal	N. Grant	348	10.2	
Majority		252	7.4	
Turnout		3,428		
Conservative gain from Liberal		Swing		
Conservative gain from Liberal		Swing		

St. John's By-election 18 June 1964
Party	Candidate	Votes	%	±%
Liberal	W. D. Penfold	690	44.7	−13.8
Conservative	K. Orton	674	43.7	+2.2
Labour	G. Merrick	178	11.5	N/A
Majority		16	1.0	−16.0
Turnout		1,542		
Liberal hold		Swing		

Sale Moor By-election 18 June 1964
Party	Candidate	Votes	%	±%
Labour	G. Ewing	1,163	52.2	−0.7
Liberal	R. C. Ankers	553	24.8	−22.3
Conservative	J. Pollard	512	23.0	N/A
Majority		610	27.4	+21.6
Turnout		2,228		
Labour gain from Liberal		Swing		
