= 1967 Sale Municipal Borough Council election =

Local election in Cheshire, England

| ← 1966 | 11 May 1967 | 1968 → |

8 of 32 seats to Sale Municipal Borough Council 16 seats needed for a majority
| | First party | Second party | Third party |
|---|---|---|---|
| Party | Conservative | Labour | Liberal |
| Last election | 7 seats, 52.3% | 2 seats, 22.5% | 1 seats, 25.2% |
| Seats before | 18 | 8 | 6 |
| Seats won | 7 | 1 | 0 |
| Seats after | 21 | 6 | 5 |
| Seat change | ▲3 | ▼2 | ▼1 |
| Popular vote | 8,034 | 3,081 | 2,020 |
| Percentage | 58.0% | 22.2% | 14.6% |
| Swing | ▲5.7% | ▼0.3% | ▼10.6% |
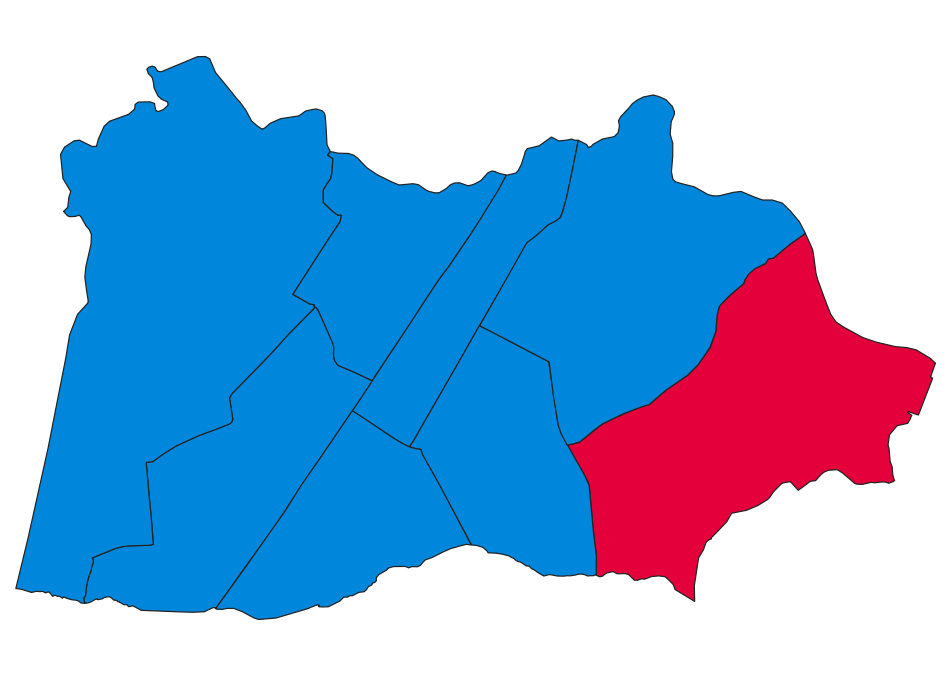
- Map of results of 1967 election
Leader of the Council before election
Conservative
Leader of the Council after election
Conservative

Elections to Sale Council were held on Thursday, 11 May 1967. One third of the councillors were up for election, with each successful candidate to serve a three-year term of office. The Conservative Party retained overall control of the council.

== Election result ==
| Party | Votes | | Seats | | | Full Council | |
| Conservative Party | 8,034 (58.0%) | ▲5.7 | 7 (87.5%) | 7 / 8 | ▲3 | 21 (65.6%) | 21 / 32 |
| Labour Party | 3,081 (22.2%) | ▼0.3 | 1 (12.5%) | 1 / 8 | ▼2 | 6 (18.8%) | 6 / 32 |
| Liberal Party | 2,020 (14.6%) | ▼10.6 | 0 (0.0%) | 0 / 8 | ▼1 | 5 (15.6%) | 5 / 32 |
| Independent | 599 (4.3%) | N/A | 0 (0.0%) | 0 / 8 | N/A | 0 (0.0%) | 0 / 32 |
| Communist Party | 115 (0.8%) | N/A | 0 (0.0%) | 0 / 8 | N/A | 0 (0.0%) | 0 / 32 |

=== Full council ===
↓
| 6 | 5 | 21 |

=== Aldermen ===
↓
| 1 | 4 | 3 |

=== Councillors ===
↓
| 5 | 1 | 18 |

== Ward results ==
=== Brooklands ===
Brooklands
| Party | Candidate | Votes | % | ±% |
|---|---|---|---|---|
| Conservative | J. W. Rodgers* | 1,118 | 65.0 | +15.6 |
| Liberal | E. Mitchell | 602 | 35.0 | −15.6 |
| Majority | | 516 | 30.0 | |
| Turnout | | 1,720 | | |
| Conservative hold | | Swing | | |

=== Mersey ===
Mersey
| Party | Candidate | Votes | % | ±% |
|---|---|---|---|---|
| Conservative | J. L. Ferguson | 842 | 54.4 | +6.8 |
| Labour | A. Z. Keller | 463 | 29.9 | −7.2 |
| Liberal | J. B. Sullivan | 242 | 15.7 | +0.4 |
| Majority | | 379 | 24.5 | +14.0 |
| Turnout | | 1,547 | | |
| Conservative hold | | Swing | | |

=== St. Anne's ===
St. Anne's
| Party | Candidate | Votes | % | ±% |
|---|---|---|---|---|
| Conservative | F. S. Laughton* | 918 | 68.9 | |
| Independent | A. Ashcroft | 415 | 31.1 | N/A |
| Majority | | 503 | 37.8 | |
| Turnout | | 1,333 | | |
| Conservative hold | | Swing | | |

=== St. John's ===
St. John's
| Party | Candidate | Votes | % | ±% |
|---|---|---|---|---|
| Conservative | K. A. Simpson | 1,025 | 58.8 | +2.4 |
| Liberal | W. D. Penfold* | 718 | 41.2 | −2.4 |
| Majority | | 307 | 17.6 | +4.8 |
| Turnout | | 1,743 | | |
| Conservative gain from Liberal | | Swing | | |

=== St. Martin's ===
St. Martin's
| Party | Candidate | Votes | % | ±% |
|---|---|---|---|---|
| Conservative | J. Lewis | 1,676 | 58.5 | −2.6 |
| Labour | W. Munro* | 1,187 | 41.5 | +2.6 |
| Majority | | 489 | 17.0 | −5.3 |
| Turnout | | 2,863 | | |
| Conservative gain from Labour | | Swing | | |

=== St. Mary's ===
St. Mary's
| Party | Candidate | Votes | % | ±% |
|---|---|---|---|---|
| Conservative | H. Jackson* | 1,281 | 77.9 | −3.2 |
| Independent | M. Brown | 184 | 11.2 | N/A |
| Labour | A. Mackie | 180 | 10.9 | −8.0 |
| Majority | | 1,097 | 66.7 | +4.6 |
| Turnout | | 1,645 | | |
| Conservative hold | | Swing | | |

=== St. Paul's ===
St. Paul's
| Party | Candidate | Votes | % | ±% |
|---|---|---|---|---|
| Conservative | G. A. Banner | 564 | 54.7 | +10.1 |
| Labour | J. Aston* | 468 | 45.3 | −10.1 |
| Majority | | 96 | 9.3 | |
| Turnout | | 1,032 | | |
| Conservative gain from Labour | | Swing | | |

=== Sale Moor ===
Sale Moor
| Party | Candidate | Votes | % | ±% |
|---|---|---|---|---|
| Labour | R. Mee* | 783 | 39.8 | −6.9 |
| Conservative | G. Yates | 610 | 31.0 | +8.4 |
| Liberal | E. J. Maxim | 458 | 23.3 | −7.4 |
| Communist | A. Burrage | 115 | 5.9 | N/A |
| Majority | | 173 | 8.8 | +7.2 |
| Turnout | | 1,966 | | |
| Labour hold | | Swing | | |
