= 1963 Sale Municipal Borough Council election =

Local election in Cheshire, England

← 1962	9 May 1963	1964 →

8 of 32 seats to Sale Municipal Borough Council 16 seats needed for a majority
	First party	Second party	Third party
Party	Liberal	Conservative	Labour
Last election	7 seats, 47.9%	1 seats, 33.9%	1 seats, 18.2%
Seats before	12	14	6
Seats won	5	2	1
Seats after	15	12	5
Seat change	▲3	▼2	▼1
Popular vote	8,908	5,968	3,547
Percentage	48.4%	32.4%	19.3%
Swing	▲0.5%	▼1.5%	▲1.1%
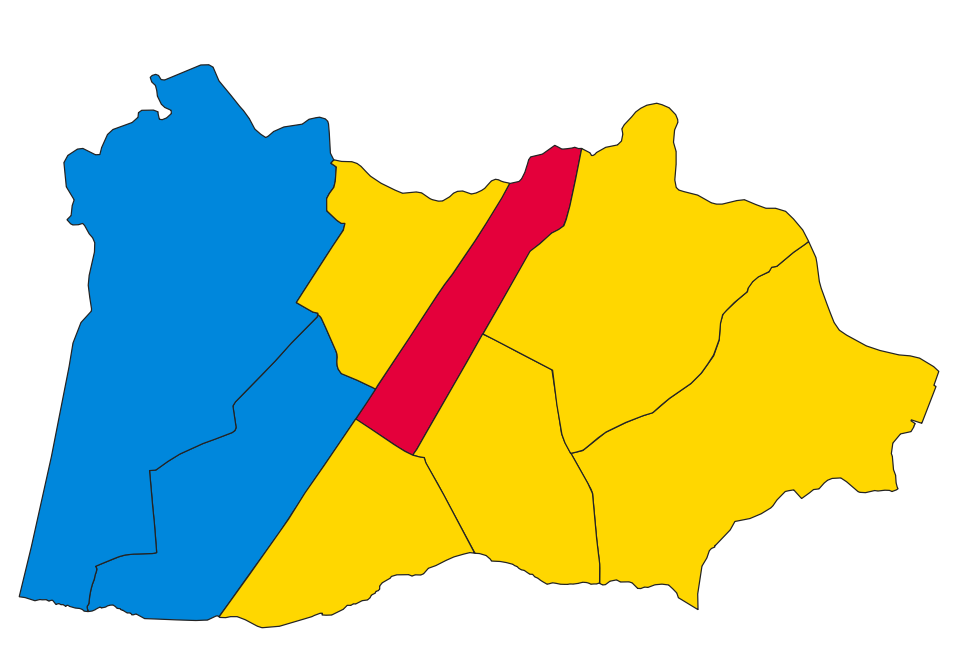
- Map of results of 1963 election
Leader of the Council before election
No overall control
Leader of the Council after election
No overall control

Elections to Sale Council were held on Thursday, 9 May 1963. One third of the councillors were up for election, with each successful candidate to serve a three-year term of office. The council remained under no overall control.

== Election result ==
Party	Votes		Seats			Full Council	
Liberal Party	8,908 (48.4%)	▲0.5	5 (62.5%)	5 / 8	▲3	15 (46.9%)	15 / 32
Conservative Party	5,968 (32.4%)	▼1.5	2 (25.0%)	2 / 8	▼2	12 (37.5%)	12 / 32
Labour Party	3,547 (19.3%)	▲1.1	1 (12.5%)	1 / 8	▼1	5 (15.6%)	5 / 32

=== Full council ===
↓
5	15	12

=== Aldermen ===
↓
1	7

=== Councillors ===
↓
4	15	5

== Ward results ==
=== Brooklands ===
Brooklands
Party	Candidate	Votes	%	±%
Liberal	P. W. Croft	1,087	52.7	−3.1
Conservative	L. M. Angus-Butterworth	974	47.3	+3.1
Majority		113	5.4	−6.2
Turnout		2,061		
Liberal gain from Conservative		Swing		

=== Mersey ===
Mersey
Party	Candidate	Votes	%	±%
Liberal	C. S. Fink*	986	57.9	+13.2
Conservative	R. Procter	716	42.1	+3.6
Majority		270	16.8	+9.6
Turnout		1,702		
Liberal hold		Swing		

=== St. Anne's ===
St. Anne's
Party	Candidate	Votes	%	±%
Liberal	J. B. Sullivan*	1,289	58.1	
Conservative	F. S. Laughton	929	41.9	
Majority		360	16.2	
Turnout		2,218		
Liberal hold		Swing		

=== St. John's ===
St. John's
Party	Candidate	Votes	%	±%
Liberal	H. K. Smith	1,212	56.6	N/A
Conservative	R. G. Houlgate	821	38.4	N/A
Labour	A. L. Merrick	107	5.0	N/A
Majority		391	18.3	
Turnout		2,140		
Liberal gain from Conservative		Swing		

=== St. Martin's ===
St. Martin's
Party	Candidate	Votes	%	±%
Conservative	R. S. Heath*	1,489	38.9	+2.0
Labour	R. Mee	1,168	30.6	+1.3
Liberal	R. Stockton	1,166	30.5	−6.4
Majority		321	8.3	
Turnout		3,823		
Conservative hold		Swing		

=== St. Mary's ===
St. Mary's
Party	Candidate	Votes	%	±%
Conservative	G. Russell*	1,039	49.2	+6.2
Liberal	E. Hodkinson	836	39.6	−17.4
Labour	A. Mackie	238	11.2	N/A
Majority		203	9.6	
Turnout		2,113		
Conservative hold		Swing		

=== St. Paul's ===
St. Paul's
Party	Candidate	Votes	%	±%
Labour	E. P. Mellor*	850	55.4	+18.0
Liberal	J. Cooper	685	44.6	+12.7
Majority		165	10.8	+5.3
Turnout		1,535		
Labour hold		Swing		

=== Sale Moor ===
Sale Moor
Party	Candidate	Votes	%	±%
Liberal	V. A. M. Flynn	1,647	58.2	+14.5
Labour	K. Walton	1,184	41.8	+0.5
Majority		463	16.4	+14.0
Turnout		2,831		
Liberal gain from Labour		Swing		

== By-elections between 1963 and 1964 ==
St. John's By-election 8 August 1963
Party	Candidate	Votes	%	±%
Liberal	J. Cooper	773	50.3	−6.3
Conservative	P. A. A. Pepper	582	37.9	−0.5
Labour	A. L. Merrick	182	11.8	+6.8
Majority		191	12.4	−5.9
Turnout		1,537		
Liberal gain from Conservative		Swing		
