= Brian Clancy =

British structural engineer

Brian Clancy FIStructE FICE FCIOB
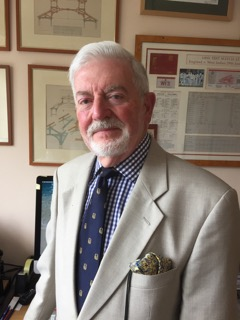
- Born: 1940 (age 85–86); London
- Education: St Benedict’s School, Ealing, University College, London.
- Engineering career
- Discipline: Structural engineer
- Institutions: Institution of Structural Engineers; Institution of Civil Engineers
- Practice name: Clancy Consulting.
- Projects: Matchpoint Tennis Centre in South Manchester, Reconstruction of (part of) The Victorian Pavilion, Buxton, Derbyshire

Brian Clancy (born 1940, London) is a British structural engineer.

== Early life and education ==
After graduating from University College London with a degree in Civil Engineering Clancy started working at Oscar Faber Consulting Engineers (now AECOM) where he worked as a Resident engineer building a reinforced concrete silo and a large warehouse.

== Career ==
In 1966 Clancy moved to Manchester with his new wife Mo to work for C S Allott & Son now Jacobs since 2004. In 1969 he set up his own practice with a colleague but branched out on his own in 1972. The company became Clancy Consulting Chartered Consulting Engineers. When Clancy resigned from the company in 1999 it had grown to 130 staff with offices in 4 UK cities.

Clancy served as a Local Councillor on Trafford Council for Mersey St Mary's between 1971-78 and Magistrate 1979-2007 and member of the Board of Governors of the University of Manchester Clancy was President of the Institution of Structural Engineers in 1996-97. The Clancy Award named after him. is to the author(s) of a paper published in The Structural Engineer on the whole-life management of structures. Clancy has worked on the subsidence and inspection of low-rise buildings.

== Awards and honours ==
- Visiting Professor Liverpool John Moores University 1996-2010
- Sir Arnold Waters Medal 2007 Institution of Structural Engineers
- University of Manchester Medal of Honour 2006

== Selected projects ==
- Matchpoint Tennis Centre in South Manchester in South Manchester,
- Reconstruction of (part of) The Victorian Pavilion, Buxton, Derbyshire
