= Green Party of England and Wales election results =

This article lists the election results of the Green Party of England and Wales (and its predecessors) in the UK parliamentary, European parliamentary, London Assembly, and Senedd elections.

== Westminster elections ==
=== Summary performance ===
Year	Candidates	Total votes	% of total vote	Change	Average vote	Average % vote	Saved deposits	No. of MPs	Change	Notes
1974 (Feb)	6	4,576	0.0%	New	763	1.7%	0	0	Steady	as PEOPLE Party
1974 (Oct)	5	1,996	0.0%	Steady	399	0.9%	0	0	Steady	as PEOPLE Party
1979	53	39,918	0.1%	▲0.1%	753	1.5%	0	0	Steady	as Ecology Party
1983	109	54,299	0.2%	▲0.1%	498	1.0%	0	0	Steady	as Ecology Party
1987	133	89,753	0.3%	▲0.1%	675	1.4%	0	0	Steady	as Green Party (UK)
1992	253	170,037	0.5%	▲0.2%	672	1.3%	0	0	Steady	
1997	89	61,731	0.2%	▼0.3%	694	1.3%	0	0	Steady	
2001	145	166,477	0.6%	▲0.4%	1,148	2.8%	10	0	Steady	
2005	182	257,758	1.0%	▲0.4%	1,416	3.2%	22	0	Steady	
2010	310	265,247	0.9%	▼0.1%	855	1.8%	6	1	▲1	
2015	538	1,111,603	3.8%	▲2.9%	2,066	4.3%	123	1	Steady	
2017	457	525,565	1.6%	▼2.2%	1,150	2.1%	8	1	Steady	
2019	472	865,715	2.7%	▲1.1%	1,834	3.6%	29	1	Steady	
2024	574	1,841,888	9.2%	▲3.7%	3,209	7.2%	359	4	▲3	

=== General election 2010 ===
The 2010 general election was a milestone for the Green Party as party leader Caroline Lucas was elected Britain's first Green MP in Brighton Pavilion with 31.3% of the vote. The Green Party fielded 310 candidates, six of whom saved their deposits. Green candidates came 4th in Norwich South, Hove, Brighton Kemptown, Cambridge and Lewisham Deptford. Overall the Green party received 1.0% of votes in the General election.

Constituency	Votes	%	Change % +/-
Aldridge	847	2.2	NA
Ashford	1014	1.8	▼1.6
Birmingham Edgbaston	469	1.1	▼1.7
Birmingham Ladywood	859	2.4	▲2.1
Birmingham Northfield	406	1.0	NA
Birmingham Selly Oak	664	1.4	▼2.2
Banbury	959	1.7	▼1.1
Barking	317	0.7	▼1.0
Barrow & F	530	1.2	NA
Bath	1120	2.4	▼3.6
Batley & S	605	1.2	▼0.5
Battersea	559	1.1	▼3.1
Beaconsfield	768	1.5	NA
Beckenham	608	1.3	NA
Bedford	393	0.9	NA
Bedfordshire M	773	1.4	▼1.2
Bermondsey	718	1.6	▼1.4
Bethnal Green	856	1.7	▼2.8
Beverley & H	686	1.3	NA
Bexleyheath	371	0.9	NA
Bolton SE	614	1.6	NA
Bolton W	545	1.2	NA
Bracknell	825	1.6	NA
Bradford W	940	2.3	▼0.7
Braintree	718	1.5	▼1.4
Brecon & Radnor	341	0.9	NA
Brent C	668	1.5	▼2.1
Brent N	725	1.4	NA
Brentford	787	1.5	▼2.1
Brentwood	584	1.2	NA
Bridgwater	859	1.6	▼1.1
Brighton Kemptown	2330	5.5	▼1.1
Brighton Pavilion	16238	31.3	▲9.4
Bristol E	803	1.8	▼0.9
Bristol NW	511	1.0	NA
Bristol S	1216	2.5	▼2.5
Bristol W	2090	3.8	▼1.9
Broadland	752	1.4	NA
Bromley	607	1.4	▼2.3
Broxtowe	423	0.8	▼1.1
Bury S	493	1.0	NA
Bury St Edmunds	2521	4.3	▲1.3
Calder Valley	858	1.7	▼1.2
Camberwell	1361	2.9	▼1.7
Camborne	581	1.4	NA
Cambridge	3804	7.6	▲4.7
Cambridgeshire S	1039	1.8	▼0.9
Cambridgeshire SE	766	1.3	NA
Canterbury	1137	2.3	▼1.0
Cardiff Central	575	1.6	NA
Cardiff North	362	0.8	NA
Cardiff South	554	1.3	▼0.6
Cardiff West	750	1.8	NA
Carlisle	614	1.5	NA
Carshalton	355	0.8	▼1.4
Ceredigion	696	1.8	▼0.5
Chatham	396	0.9	NA
Chelmsford	476	0.9	NA
Chelsea	671	1.7	▼2.5
Chesham	767	1.5	▼2.0
Chester	535	1.1	NA
Chesterfield	600	1.3	NA
Chingford	650	1.5	NA
Chippenham	446	0.9	NA
Chipping Barnet	1021	2.0	▼0.8
City of Westminster	778	2.1	▼2.2
Clacton	535	1.2	NA
Colchester	694	1.5	NA
Colne Valley	867	1.6	▼1.1
Copeland	389	0.9	NA
Cornwall SE	826	1.7	NA
Cotswolds	940	1.7	NA
Coventry NW	497	1.1	NA
Coventry S	639	1.4	NA
Crawley	598	1.3	NA
Croydon C	581	1.2	▼1.0
Croydon N	1017	2.0	▼0.8
Croydon S	981	1.7	NA
Dagenham	296	0.7	NA
Daventry	770	1.5	NA
Derbyshire Dales	772	1.7	NA
Devizes	813	1.8	NA
Devon C	1044	1.9	NA
Devon E	815	1.5	NA
Devon N	697	1.4	▼2.3
Devon SW	641	1.3	NA
Devon W	1050	1.9	▼2.0
Dewsbury	849	1.6	▼0.5
Dorset North	546	1.0	▼1.3
Dorset South	595	1.2	NA
Dorset West	675	1.2	▼0.6
Dulwich	1266	2.6	▼3.7
Ealing Central	737	1.6	▼3.2
Ealing North	505	1.1	▼1.7
Ealing Southall	705	1.7	▼3.0
East Ham	586	1.2	NA
Edmonton	516	1.3	▼0.9
Eltham	419	1.0	NA
Enfield North	489	1.1	NA
Enfield Southgate	632	1.4	▼1.4
Epping Forest	659	1.4	NA
Erewash	534	1.1	NA
Erith & Thamesmead	322	0.8	NA
Exeter	792	1.5	▼2.3
Fareham	791	1.5	NA
Faversham	890	1.9	NA
Feltham	530	1.1	▼1.2
Filton	441	0.9	NA
Finchley	737	1.6	▼1.0
Folkestone	637	1.2	▼0.3
Forest of Dean	923	1.9	▼0.2
Fylde	654	1.5	NA
Gateshead	379	1.0	NA
Gillingham	356	0.8	NA
Gloucester	511	1.0	▼0.7
Gosport	573	1.2	▼1.7
Gravesham	675	1.4	NA
Great Yarmouth	416	1.0	NA
Greenwich	1054	2.6	▼1.9
Hackney North	2133	4.6	▼5.1
Hackney South	1493	3.5	▼2.0
Haltemprice	669	1.4	NA
Halton	647	1.6	NA
Hammersmith	696	1.5	▼2.6
Hampstead	759	1.4	▼2.2
Harrow East	793	1.7	NA
Harrow West	625	1.4	NA
Harwich	909	1.9	▼1.7
Hayes	348	0.8	▼0.6
Hendon	518	1.1	▼0.7
Henley	1328	2.5	▼0.8
Herefordshire North	1533	3.2	▼1.5
Hertfordshire North East	875	1.7	NA
Hertsmere	604	1.3	NA
High Peak	922	1.8	NA
Hitchin	807	1.5	NA
Holborn	1480	2.7	▼4.8
Hornchurch	542	1.0	▼0.1
Hornsey	1261	2.3	▼2.7
Horsham	570	1.0	NA
Hove	2568	5.2	▼0.6
Huddersfield	1641	4.1	▼0.5
Hull North	478	1.4	▼1.6
Huntingdon	652	1.2	NA
Hyndburn	463	1.1	NA
Ilford N	871	1.9	NA
Ilford S	1319	2.6	NA
Ipswich	775	1.7	NA
IOW	931	1.3	NA
Islington North	1348	3.0	▼4.1
Islington South	710	1.6	▼3.1
Kenilworth	568	1.2	NA
Kensington	753	2.1	▼2.4
Kingston	555	1.0	NA
Kingswood	383	0.8	NA
Lancashire West	485	1.0	NA
Lancaster	1888	4.4	▼1.4
Leeds North West	508	1.2	▼1.5
Leeds West	1832	4.7	▼2.5
Leicester East	733	1.5	NA
Leicester South	770	1.6	▼1.7
Leicester West	639	1.8	▼3.0
Lewes	729	1.5	▼0.8
Lewisham Deptford	2772	6.7	▼3.4
Lewisham East	624	1.5	▼2.7
Lewisham West	931	2.1	▼0.3
Leyton	562	1.4	▼3.0
Liverpool Riverside	1355	3.5	▼1.7
Liverpool Wavertree	598	1.6	NA
Ludlow	447	0.9	▼0.9
Luton North	490	1.1	NA
Luton South	366	0.9	▼1.2
Macclesfield	840	1.7	NA
Maidenhead	482	0.9	NA
Maidstone	655	1.3	NA
Manchester Central	915	2.3	▼1.9
Manchester Gorton	1048	2.7	NA
Manchester Withington	798	1.8	▼2.5
Meriden	678	1.3	NA
Milton Keynes North	733	1.4	▼0.8
Milton Keynes South	774	1.4	▼1.3
Mitcham	381	0.9	▼2.6
Mole Valley	895	1.7	NA
Monmouth	587	1.3	NA
Morecambe	598	1.4	NA
New Forest East	1024	2.1	NA
New Forest West	1059	2.2	▼1.9
Newbury	490	0.8	NA
Newcastle Central	568	1.7	▼2.2
Newcastle East	620	1.6	NA
Newcastle North	319	0.7	NA
Newport West	450	1.1	▼0.4
Newton Abbot	701	1.5	NA
Norfolk M	1457	2.9	NA
Norfolk N	508	1.0	NA
Norfolk NW	745	1.6	NA
Norfolk S	1000	1.8	NA
Norfolk SW	830	1.7	NA
Northampton North	443	1.1	NA
Northampton South	363	0.9	NA
Northamptonshire South	685	1.1	NA
Norwich North	1245	2.9	▼0.3
Norwich South	7095	14.9	▲7.5
Nottingham East	928	2.8	▼3.4
Nottingham South	630	1.5	NA
Old Bexley	371	0.8	NA
Orpington	511	1.0	NA
Oxford East	1238	2.4	▼2.1
Oxford West	1184	2.1	▼1.7
Peterborough	523	1.2	NA
Plymouth Moor View	398	1.0	NA
Plymouth Sutton	904	2.1	NA
Pontypridd	361	1.0	NA
Poplar	449	1.0	▼1.7
Portsmouth North	461	1.0	NA
Portsmouth South	716	1.7	NA
Putney	591	1.5	▼1.3
Reading East	1069	2.1	▼1.4
Reading West	582	1.2	▼1.0
Redditch	393	0.9	NA
Reigate	1087	2.2	NA
Richmond	1516	2.8	▼0.3
Richmond Park	572	1.0	▼1.7
Rochester	734	1.5	NA
Rochford	707	1.7	▼1.8
Romford	447	1.0	NA
Rugby	451	1.0	NA
Ruislip	740	1.5	Steady
Runnymede	696	1.5	▼1.3
Rushcliffe	1251	2.3	▼1.2
Saffron Walden	735	1.4	NA
St Albans	758	1.4	NA
St Ives	1308	2.9	▼1.1
Salisbury	506	1.0	▼2.4
Scarborough	734	1.5	▼1.1
Scunthorpe	396	1.1	NA
Sheffield Central	1556	3.8	▼3.0
Sheffield Hallam	919	1.8	▼0.8
Sheffield Heeley	989	2.4	▼1.2
Shipley	1477	3.0	▼0.4
Shrewsbury	565	1.1	▼1.2
Shropshire North	808	1.6	NA
Slough	542	1.1	▼0.9
Somerset North East	670	1.3	NA
South Holland	724	1.4	NA
South Shields	762	2.1	NA
Southampton Itchen	600	1.4	NA
Southampton Test	881	2.0	▼1.6
Southend West	644	1.5	NA
Stafford	564	1.1	NA
Stalybridge	679	1.7	▼1.4
Stockport	677	1.7	NA
Stone	490	1.0	NA
Stourbridge	394	0.8	NA
Stratford-on-Avon	527	1.0	▼2.2
Streatham	861	1.8	▼3.7
Stretford	916	2.0	NA
Stroud	1542	2.7	▼3.0
Suffolk Central	1452	2.7	▼0.6
Suffolk Coastal	1103	2.0	▼1.3
Surrey South West	690	1.2	NA
Sussex Mid	645	1.2	NA
Sutton & Cheam	246	0.5	NA
Sutton Coldfield	535	1.1	NA
Swansea East	318	1.0	▼0.6
Swansea West	404	1.1	▼1.1
Swindon North	487	1.0	NA
Swindon South	619	1.3	▼1.6
Tewkesbury	525	1.0	▼2.1
Tiverton	802	1.5	▼1.3
Tonbridge	764	1.5	NA
Tooting	609	1.2	▼2.9
Torbay	468	1.0	NA
Torfaen	438	1.2	NA
Totnes	1181	2.5	NA
Tottenham	980	2.4	▼2.2
Truro	858	1.8	NA
Tunbridge Wells	914	1.8	NA
Twickenham	674	1.1	▼1.7
Tynemouth	538	1.0	NA
Uxbridge	477	1.1	NA
Vale of Glamorgan	457	0.9	NA
Vauxhall	708	1.6	▼2.8
Wakefield	873	2.0	Steady
Walthamstow	767	1.9	NA
Wansbeck	601	1.6	▼1.8
Wantage	1044	1.9	▼0.7
Warrington South	427	0.8	NA
Warwick	693	1.4	▼2.0
Watford	885	1.6	▼1.3
Waveney	1167	2.3	▼0.1
Wealden	1383	2.5	▼1.9
Weaver Vale	338	0.8	NA
Wellingborough	480	0.9	NA
Wells	631	1.1	NA
Welwyn Hatfield	796	1.6	NA
West Ham	645	1.4	▼1.6
Westminster North	478	1.2	▼3.5
Wiltshire North	599	1.2	NA
Wimbledon	590	1.2	▼2.1
Windsor	628	1.3	▼1.1
Witham	1419	3.0	NA
Witney	2385	4.1	▲1.0
Wokingham	567	1.0	NA
Worcester	735	1.5	▼1.5
Worcestershire Mid	593	1.2	NA
Worcestershire West	641	1.2	▼1.2
Worthing East	1126	2.3	NA
Worthing West	996	2.0	NA
York Central	1669	3.6	▼1.7
Yorkshire East	762	1.5	NA

=== General election 2015 ===
The Green Party stood in 571 seats across the UK in the 2015 general election. They held Brighton Pavilion and came second in Bristol West, Liverpool Riverside, Manchester Gorton and Sheffield Central, with third places in 17 constituencies.

It was the first time the party garnered more than one million votes in a general election. Deposits were saved in 123 constituencies, where the Green candidate collected at least 5% of the votes cast.

Constituency	Candidate	Votes	%
Aberavon	Jonathan Tier	711	2.3
Aberconwy	Petra Haig	727	2.4
Aldershot	Carl Hewitt	2,025	4.4
Aldridge-Brownhills	Martyn Curzey	826	2.1
Altrincham and Sale West	Nick Robertson-Brown	1,983	3.9
Alyn and Deeside	Alasdair Ibbotson	976	2.4
Amber Valley	John Devine	1,087	2.4
Arundel and South Downs	Isabel Thurston	3,606	6.4
Ashton-Under-Lyne	Charlotte Hughes	1,531	3.9
Aylesbury	David Lyons	2,135	3.9
Banbury	Ian Middleton	2,686	4.6
Barking	Tony Rablen	897	2.0
Barnsley Central	Michael Short	938	2.6
Barrow and Furness	Robert O'Hara	1,061	2.5
Bath	Dominic Tristram	5,634	11.9
Batley and Spen	Ian Bullock	1,232	2.4
Battersea	Joe Stuart	1,682	3.3
Beckenham	Ruth Fabricant	1,878	3.9
Bedford	Ben Foley	1,412	3.1
Belfast East	Ross Brown	1,058	2.7
Belfast South	Clare Bailey	2,238	5.7
Bethnal Green and Bow	Alistair Polson	4,906	9.3
Beverley and Holderness	Richard Howarth	1,802	3.4
Bexhill and Battle	Jonathan Kent	2,807	5.1
Bexleyheath and Crayford	Stella Gardiner	950	2.2
Birkenhead	Kenny Peers	1,626	4.2
Birmingham, Edgbaston	Phil Simpson	1,371	3.3
Birmingham, Erdington	Joe Belcher	948	2.7
Birmingham, Hall Green	Elly Stanton	2,200	4.7
Birmingham, Hodge Hill	Christopher Nash	835	2
Birmingham, Ladywood	Anne Margaret Okole	1,501	4.2
Birmingham, Northfield	Anna Masters	1,169	2.8
Birmingham, Perry Barr	James Lovatt	1,330	3.2
Birmingham, Selly Oak	Clare Thomas	2,301	5.1
Birmingham, Yardley	Grant Bishop	698	1.7
Bishop Auckland	Thom Robinson	1,545	3.9
Blackley and Broughton	David Jones	1,567	4.2
Blaenau Gwent	Mark Pond	738	2.3
Blaydon	Paul McNally	1,648	3.7
Bognor Regis and Littlehampton	Simon McDougall	1,942	4.1
Bolton North East	Laura Diggle	1,103	2.6
Bolton South East	Alan Johnson	1,200	3.0
Boston and Skegness	Victoria Percival	800	1.9
Bournemouth East	Alasdair Keddie	3,263	7.3
Bournemouth West	Elizabeth McManus	3,107	7.4
Bracknell	Derek Florey	2,202	4.2
Bradford East	Dave Stevens	871	2.1
Bradford South	Andy Robinson	1,243	3.3
Bradford West	Celia Hickson	1,085	2.7
Braintree	Paul Jeater	1,564	3.1
Brecon and Radnorshire	Chris Carmichael	1,261	3.2
Brent Central	Shahrar Ali	1,912	4.1
Brent North	Scott Bartle	1,539	3.0
Brentford and Isleworth	Daniel Goldsmith	2,120	3.7
Brentwood and Ongar	Reza Hossain	1,397	2.7
Bridgend	Tony White	736	1.9
Brigg and Goole	Natalie Hurst	915	2.1
Brighton, Kemptown	Davy Jones	3,187	7.0
Brighton, Pavilion	Caroline Lucas	22,871	41.8
Bristol East	Lorraine Francis	3,827	8.3
Bristol North West	Justin Quinnell	2,952	5.7
Bristol South	Tony Dyer	5,861	11.5
Bristol West	Darren Hall	17,227	26.8
Broadland	Andrew Boswell	2,252	4.2
Bromley and Chislehurst	Roisin Robertson	1,823	4.1
Bromsgrove	Spoz Esposito	1,729	3.3
Broxbourne	Russell Secker	1,216	2.6
Broxtowe	David Kirwan	1,544	2.9
Buckingham	Alan Francis	7,400	13.8
Burton	Sam Patrone	1,224	2.5
Bury St Edmunds	Helen Geake	4,692	7.9
Calder Valley	Jenny Shepherd	2,090	3.9
Camborne and Redruth	Geoffrey Garbett	2,608	5.7
Cambridge	Rupert Read	4,109	7.9
Canterbury	Stuart Jeffery	3,746	7.0
Cardiff Central	Christopher von Ruhland	2,461	6.4
Cardiff North	Ruth Osner	1,254	2.5
Cardiff South and Penarth	Anthony Slaughter	1,746	3.7
Carshalton and Wallington	Ross Hemingway	1,492	3.1
Castle Point	Dominic Ellis	1,076	2.4
Central Devon	Andy Williamson	4,866	8.9
Chatham and Aylesford	Luke Balnave	1,101	2.6
Chelmsford	Angela Thomson	1,892	3.5
Chelsea and Fulham	Guy Rubin	1,474	3.7
Cheltenham	Adam Van Coevorden	2,689	5.0
Chesterfield	Matthew Genn	1,352	3.0
Chichester	Jasper Richmond	3,742	6.6
Chingford and Woodford Green	Rebecca Tully	1,854	4.2
Chipping Barnet	AM Poppy	2,501	4.7
Christchurch	Shona Dunn	2,149	4.3
Cities Of London and Westminster	Hugh Small	1,953	5.4
City Of Durham	Jonathan Elmer	2,687	5.9
Clacton	Chris Southall	1,184	2.7
Clwyd South	Duncan Rees	915	2.6
Colchester	Mark Goacher	2,499	5.1
Colne Valley	Chas Ball	1,919	3.4
Congleton	Alec Heath	1,876	3.7
Corby	Jonathan Hornett	1,374	2.5
Coventry North East	Matthew Handley	1,245	3.0
Coventry North West	Laura Vesty	1,961	4.3
Coventry South	Ben Gallaher	1,719	3.9
Crawley	Guy Hudson	1,100	2.3
Croydon Central	Esther Sutton	1,454	2.8
Croydon North	Shasha Khan	2,515	4.7
Croydon South	Peter Underwood	2,154	3.7
Dagenham and Rainham	Kate Simpson	806	1.9
Dartford	Andy Blatchford	1,324	2.5
Daventry	Steve Whiffen	1,829	3.5
Delyn	Kay Roney	680	1.8
Denton and Reddish	Nick Koopman	1,466	3.8
Derby North	Alice Mason-Power	1,618	3.6
Derby South	David Foster	1,208	3.0
Derbyshire Dales	Ian Wood	2,173	4.6
Devizes	Emma Dawnay	2,853	5.8
Dewsbury	Adrian Cruden	1,366	2.6
Doncaster North	Pete Kennedy	757	1.9
Dover	Jolyon Trimingham	1,295	2.6
Dudley North	Will Duckworth	517	1.4
Dudley South	Vicky Duckworth	970	2.5
Easington	Martie Warin	733	2.1
East Hampshire	Peter Bisset	3,176	6.2
East Surrey	Nicky Dodgson	2,159	3.9
East Worthing and Shoreham	James Doyle	2,605	5.2
East Yorkshire	Mark Maloney	1,731	3.5
Eastleigh	Ron Meldrum	1,513	2.7
Eddisbury	Andrew Garman	1,624	3.4
Edmonton	Douglas Coker	1,358	3.3
Ellesmere Port and Neston	Michelle Palmer	990	2.1
Elmet and Rothwell	Dave Brooks	1,261	2.2
Eltham	James Parker	1,275	3.0
Enfield North	David Flint	1,303	2.8
Enfield, Southgate	Jean Robertson-Molloy	1,690	3.7
Epsom and Ewell	Susan McGrath	2,116	3.7
Erith and Thamesmead	Ann Garrett	941	2.2
Esher and Walton	Olivia Palmer	2,355	4.1
Exeter	Diana Moore	3,491	6.5
Fareham	Miles Grindey	2,129	3.9
Faversham and Mid Kent	Tim Valentine	1,768	3.9
Feltham and Heston	Tony Firkins	1,390	2.8
Fermanagh and South Tyrone	Tanya Jones	788	1.6
Finchley and Golders Green	Adele Ward	1,357	2.7
Gateshead	Andy Redfern	1,548	4.1
Gillingham and Rainham	Neil Williams	1,133	2.4
Gosport	Monica Cassidy	1,707	3.6
Gower	Julia Marshall	1,161	2.7
Grantham and Stamford	Aidan Campbell	1,872	3.5
Gravesham	Mark Lindop	1,124	2.2
Great Yarmouth	Harry Webb	978	2.2
Greenwich and Woolwich	Abideen Akinoshun	2,991	6.4
Guildford	John Pletts	2,558	4.7
Hackney North and Stoke Newington	Heather Finlay	7,281	14.6
Hackney South and Shoreditch	Charlotte George	5,519	11.6
Halesowen and Rowley Regis	John Payne	849	1.9
Halifax	Gary Scott	1,142	2.6
Haltemprice and Howden	Tim Greene	1,809	3.7
Halton	David Melvin	1,017	2.3
Hammersmith	David Wood	2,105	4.4
Hampstead and Kilburn	Rebecca Johnson	2,387	4.4
Harborough	Darren Woodiwiss	2,177	4.2
Harrogate and Knaresborough	Shan Oakes	2,351	4.4
Harrow East	Emma Wallace	846	1.7
Harrow West	Rowan Langley	1,310	2.8
Harwich and North Essex	Christopher Flossman	2,122	4.4
Hayes and Harlington	Alick Munro	794	1.8
Hazel Grove	Graham Reid	1,140	2.6
Hemel Hempstead	Alan Borgars	1,660	3.3
Hendon	Ben Samuel	1,015	2.1
Hereford and South Herefordshire	Diana Toynbee	3,415	7.2
Hertford and Stortford	Sophie Christophy	2,681	4.8
Heywood and Middleton	Abi Jackson	1,110	2.3
High Peak	Charlotte Farrell	1,811	3.6
Hitchin and Harpenden	Richard Wise	3,053	5.5
Holborn and St Pancras	Natalie Bennett	7,013	12.8
Hornchurch and Upminster	Melanie Collins	1,411	2.6
Hornsey and Wood Green	Gordon Peters	3,146	5.4
Horsham	Darrin Green	2,198	3.9
Hove	Christopher Hawtree	3,569	6.8
Huddersfield	Andrew Cooper	2,798	6.9
Huntingdon	Tom MacLennan	2,178	3.9
Hyndburn	Kerry Gormley	1,122	2.6
Ipswich	Barry Broom	1,736	3.6
Islington North	Caroline Russell	5,043	10.2
Islington South and Finsbury	Charlie Kiss	3,371	7.6
Jarrow	Dave Herbert	1,310	3.4
Keighley	Ros Brown	1,661	3.4
Kenilworth and Southam	Rob Ballantyne	1,956	4.0
Kensington	Robina Rose	1,765	5.1
Kettering	Rob Reeves	1,633	3.5
Kingston and Surbiton	Clare Keogh	2,322	3.9
Kingston upon Hull East	Sarah Walpole	806	2.3
Kingston upon Hull North	Martin Deane	2,066	5.9
Kingston upon Hull West and Hessle	Angela Needham	943	3.0
Kingswood	Cezara Nanu	1,370	2.9
Knowsley	Vikki Gregorich	1,270	2.5
Lancaster and Fleetwood	Chris Coates	2,093	5.0
Leeds Central	Michael Hayton	3,558	7.9
Leeds East	Kate Bisson	1,117	2.9
Leeds North East	Emma Carter	2,541	5.3
Leeds North West	Tim Goodall	3,042	7.0
Leeds West	Andrew Pointon	3,217	8.4
Lewisham East	Storm Poorun	2,429	5.7
Lewisham West and Penge	Tom Chance	4,077	8.5
Lewisham, Deptford	John Coughlin	5,932	12.5
Leyton and Wanstead	Ashley Gunstock	2,974	7.3
Lichfield	Robert Pass	1,976	3.8
Liverpool, Riverside	Martin Dobson	5,372	12.1
Liverpool, Walton	Jonathan Clatworthy	956	2.5
Ludlow	Janet Phillips	2,435	5.1
Luton North	Sofiya Ahmed	972	2.3
Luton South	Simon Hall	1,237	2.9
Macclesfield	Joan Plimmer	2,404	4.9
Maidenhead	Emily Blyth	1,915	3.6
Maidstone and The Weald	Hannah Patton	1,396	2.8
Makerfield	Philip Mitchell	1,136	2.5
Maldon	Robert Graves	1,504	3.1
Manchester Central	Kieran Turner-Dave	3,838	8.5
Manchester, Gorton	Laura Bannister	4,108	9.8
Manchester, Withington	Lucy Bannister	4,048	8.1
Mansfield	Paul Frost	1,486	3.2
Meon Valley	Diana Korchien	1,831	3.5
Meriden	Alison Gavin	2,170	4.1
Merthyr Tydfil and Rhymney	Elspeth Parris	603	1.8
Mid Bedfordshire	Gareth Ellis	2,462	4.2
Mid Derbyshire	Sue MacFarlane	1,898	4.0
Mid Dorset and North Poole	Mark Chivers	1,321	2.8
Mid Norfolk	Simeon Jackson	2,191	4.2
Mid Sussex	Miranda Diboll	2,453	4.3
Mid Worcestershire	Neil Franks	1,933	3.7
Milton Keynes North	Jennifer Marklew	2,255	3.9
Milton Keynes South	Samantha Pancheri	1,936	3.3
Mitcham and Morden	Mason Redding	1,422	3.2
Mole Valley	Jacquetta Fewster	2,979	5.4
Monmouth	Chris Were	1,629	3.4
Montgomeryshire	Richard Chaloner	1,260	3.7
Morecambe and Lunesdale	Phil Chandler	1,395	3.2
Morley and Outwood	Martin Hemingway	1,264	2.6
Neath	Catrin Brock	1,185	3.2
New Forest East	Sally May	2,327	4.7
New Forest West	Janet Richards	2,748	5.8
Newark	Elayne Forster	1,792	3.4
Newcastle upon Tyne Central	Alexander Johnson	1,724	4.9
Newcastle upon Tyne East	Andrew Gray	3,426	8.7
Newcastle upon Tyne North	Alison Whalley	1,515	3.4
Newcastle-Under-Lyme	Sam Gibbons	1,246	2.9
Newport East	David Mclean	887	2.5
Newton Abbot	Steven Smyth-Bonfield	2,216	4.6
North Cornwall	Amanda Pennington	2,063	4.3
North Devon	Ricky Knight	3,018	5.8
North Down	Steven Agnew	1,958	5.5
North Durham	Vicki Nolan	1,246	3.1
North East Bedfordshire	Mark Bowler	2,537	4.3
North East Cambridgeshire	Helen Scott-Daniels	1,816	3.5
North East Derbyshire	David Kesteven	1,059	2.2
North East Hampshire	Andrew Johnston	2,364	4.4
North East Hertfordshire	Mario May	2,789	5.3
North East Somerset	Katy Boyce	2,802	5.5
North Herefordshire	Daisy Blench	3,341	7.0
North Norfolk	Mike Macartney-Filgate	1,488	3.0
North Shropshire	Duncan Kerr	2,575	4.9
North Somerset	David Derbyshire	3,806	6.5
North Swindon	Poppy Hebden-Leeder	1,723	3.3
North Tyneside	Martin Collins	1,442	3.1
North Warwickshire	Ian Bonner	894	1.9
North West Cambridgeshire	Nicola Day	2,159	3.5
North West Durham	Mark Shilcock	1,567	3.7
North West Hampshire	Dan Hill	2,541	4.6
North West Norfolk	Michael de Whalley	1,780	3.8
Northampton North	Tony Clarke	1,503	3.8
Northampton South	Julie Hawkins	1,403	3.6
Norwich North	Adrian Holmes	1,939	4.5
Norwich South	Lesley Grahame	6,749	13.9
Nuneaton	Keith Kondakor	1,281	2.8
Ogmore	Laurie Brophy	754	2.1
Old Bexley and Sidcup	Derek Moran	1,336	2.9
Oldham East and Saddleworth	Miranda Meadowcroft	1,152	2.6
Oldham West and Royton	Simeon Hart	839	1.9
Orpington	Tamara Galloway	1,732	3.5
Oxford East	Ann Duncan	5,890	11.6
Oxford West and Abingdon	Larry Sanders	2,497	4.4
Penrith and The Border	George Burrow	2,313	5.3
Peterborough	Darren Bisby-Boyd	1,218	2.6
Plymouth, Moor View	Benjamin Osborn	1,023	2.4
Poole	Adrian Oliver	2,198	4.6
Poplar and Limehouse	Maureen Childs	2,463	4.8
Portsmouth North	Gavin Ellis	1,450	3.2
Portsmouth South	Ian McCulloch	3,145	7.5
Pudsey	Claire Allen	1,539	3.0
Putney	Christopher Poole	2,067	4.8
Rayleigh and Wickford	Sarah Yapp	1,529	2.9
Reading East	Rob White	3,214	6.4
Reading West	Miriam Kennet	1,406	2.9
Redditch	Kevin White	960	2.2
Reigate	Jonathan Essex	3,434	6.7
Richmond (Yorks)	Leslie Rowe	2,313	4.3
Richmond Park	Andree Frieze	3,548	6.0
Rochdale	Mark Hollinrake	1,382	3.0
Rochester and Strood	Clive Gregory	1,516	2.9
Romford	Lorna Tooley	1,222	2.5
Romsey and Southampton North	Ian Callaghan	2,280	4.7
Rossendale and Darwen	Karen Pollard-Rylance	1,046	2.1
Rugby	Terence White	1,415	2.9
Ruislip, Northwood and Pinner	Karen Pillai	1,801	3.5
Runnymede and Weybridge	Rustam Majainah	2,071	4.1
Rushcliffe	George Mallender	3,559	6.5
Rutland and Melton	Alastair McQuillan	2,325	4.3
Saffron Walden	Karmel Stannard	2,174	3.8
Salford and Eccles	Emma Van Dyke	2,251	5.2
Salisbury	Alison Craig	2,762	5.5
Scarborough and Whitby	David Malone	2,185	4.6
Scunthorpe	Martin Dwyer	887	2.4
Sedgefield	Greg Robinson	1,213	3.1
Sefton Central	Lindsay Melia	1,184	2.4
Selby and Ainsty	Ian Richards	1,465	2.8
Sevenoaks	Amelie Boleyn	2,238	4.5
Sheffield Central	Jillian Creasy	6,999	15.8
Sheffield South East	Linda Duckenfield	1,117	2.7
Sheffield, Brightside and Hillsborough	Christine Gilligan Kubo	1,712	4.3
Sheffield, Hallam	Peter Garbutt	1,772	3.2
Sheffield, Heeley	Rita Wilcock	2,566	6.1
Sherwood	Lydia Davies-Bright	1,108	2.2
Shipley	Kevin Warnes	2,657	5.3
Shrewsbury and Atcham	Emma Bullard	2,247	4.2
Sittingbourne and Sheppey	Gary Miller	1,185	2.4
Skipton and Ripon	Andy Brown	3,116	5.7
Slough	Julian Edmonds	1,220	2.5
Solihull	Howard Allen	1,632	3.0
Somerton and Frome	Theo Simon	5,434	9.0
South Cambridgeshire	Simon Saggers	3,848	6.3
South Derbyshire	Marianne Bamkin	1,216	2.4
South Dorset	Jane Burnet	2,275	4.7
South East Cambridgeshire	Clive Semmens	3,047	5.1
South East Cornwall	Martin Corney	2,718	5.4
South Holland and The Deepings	Dan Wilshire	1,580	3.2
South Norfolk	Catherine Rowett	3,090	5.4
South Northamptonshire	Damon Boughen	2,247	3.7
South Shields	Shirley Ford	1,614	4.5
South Staffordshire	Claire McIlvenna	1,298	2.6
South Suffolk	Robert Lindsay	2,253	4.3
South Swindon	Talis Kimberley-Fairbourn	1,757	3.6
South West Bedfordshire	Emily Lawrence	2,106	4.1
South West Devon	Win Scutt	2,408	4.8
South West Norfolk	Sandra Walmsley	2,075	4.1
South West Surrey	Susan Ryland	3,105	5.4
South West Wiltshire	Phil Randle	2,985	5.8
Southampton, Itchen	John Spottiswoode	1,876	4.2
Southampton, Test	Angela Mawle	2,568	5.9
Southend West	Jonathan Fuller	2,083	4.7
Spelthorne	Paul Jacobs	1,724	3.5
St Austell and Newquay	Steve Slade	2,318	4.6
St Helens North	Elizabeth Ward	1,762	3.8
St Helens South and Whiston	James Chan	2,237	4.6
St Ives	Tim Andrewes	3,051	6.3
Staffordshire Moorlands	Brian Smith	1,226	2.9
Stalybridge and Hyde	Jenny Ross	1,850	4.5
Stevenage	Graham White	1,369	2.9
Stockport	Gary Lawson	1,753	4.4
Stoke-On-Trent Central	Jan Zablocki	1,123	3.6
Stoke-On-Trent North	Sean Adam	1,091	2.8
Stoke-On-Trent South	Luke Bellamy	1,029	2.6
Stourbridge	Christian Kiever	1,021	2.2
Stratford-On-Avon	Dominic Giles	2,128	4.1
Streatham	Jonathan Bartley	4,421	8.9
Stretford and Urmston	Geraldine Coggins	2,187	4.7
Stroud	Sarah Lunnon	2,779	4.6
Suffolk Coastal	Rachel Smith-Lyte	3,294	5.9
Surrey Heath	Kimberley Lawson	2,400	4.4
Sutton and Cheam	Maeve Tomlinson	1,051	2.1
Sutton Coldfield	David Ratcliff	1,426	2.8
Tamworth	Nicola Holmes	1,110	2.4
Tatton	Tina Rothery	1,714	3.8
Taunton Deane	Clive Martin	2,630	4.5
Telford	Peter Hawkins	930	2.3
The Wrekin	Cath Edwards	1,443	3.2
Tiverton and Honiton	Paul Edwards	3,415	6.4
Tonbridge and Malling	Howard Porter	2,366	4.4
Tooting	Esther Obiri-Darko	2,201	4.1
Torbay	Paula Hermes	1,557	3.2
Torfaen	Matt Cooke	746	2.0
Torridge and West Devon	Cathrine Simmons	3,941	7.0
Totnes	Gill Coombs	4,845	10.3
Tottenham	Dee Searle	3,931	9.2
Truro and Falmouth	Karen Westbrook	4,483	8.7
Tunbridge Wells	Marie Jones	2,659	5.2
Twickenham	Tanya Williams	2,463	4.0
Tynemouth	Julia Erskine	2,017	3.8
Uxbridge and South Ruislip	Graham Lee	1,414	3.2
Vale Of Glamorgan	Alan Armstrong	1,054	2.1
Vauxhall	Gulnar Hasnain	3,658	7.6
Wakefield	Rebecca Thackray	1,069	2.5
Wallasey	Julian Pratt	1,288	3.0
Walsall North	Mike Harrison	529	1.4
Walsall South	Charlotte Fletcher	1,149	2.8
Walthamstow	Michael Gold	2,661	6.4
Wansbeck	Chris Hedley	1,454	3.8
Wantage	Kate Prendergast	2,986	5.1
Warley	Robert Buckman	1,465	3.9
Warrington North	Sarah Hayes	1,264	2.8
Warrington South	Stephanie Davies	1,765	3.0
Warwick and Leamington	Azzees Minott	1,994	3.9
Watford	Aidan Cottrell-Boyce	1,332	2.4
Waveney	Graham Elliott	1,761	3.4
Wealden	Mark Smith	3,623	6.4
Weaver Vale	Chris Copeman	1,183	2.5
Wellingborough	Marion Turner-Hawes	2,218	4.4
Wells	Jon Cousins	2,331	4.1
Welwyn Hatfield	Marc Scheimann	1,742	3.5
West Bromwich East	Barry Lim	628	1.7
West Bromwich West	Mark Redding	697	2.0
West Dorset	Peter Barton	3,242	5.7
West Lancashire	Ben Basson	1,582	3.2
West Suffolk	Niall Pettitt	1,779	3.6
West Tyrone	Ciaran McClean	780	2.0
West Worcestershire	Julian Roskams	3,505	6.5
Westminster North	Jennifer Nadel	1,322	3.4
Westmorland and Lonsdale	Chris Loynes	1,798	3.7
Weston-Super-Mare	Richard Lawson	2,592	4.9
Wimbledon	Charles Barraball	1,986	4.1
Winchester	Michael Wilks	2,645	4.8
Windsor	Derek Wall	1,834	3.7
Wirral South	Paul Cartlidge	895	2.1
Witham	James Abbott	2,038	4.3
Witney	Stuart Macdonald	2,970	5.1
Woking	Martin Robson	2,109	4.1
Wokingham	Adrian Windisch	2,092	3.7
Wolverhampton North East	Becky Cooper	701	2.1
Wolverhampton South East	Geeta Kauldhar	605	1.7
Wolverhampton South West	Andrea Cantrill	1,058	2.6
Worcester	Louis Stephen	2,024	4.1
Worsley and Eccles South	Chris Bertenshaw	1,242	3.0
Worthing West	David Aherne	2,938	5.8
Wrexham	David Munnerley	669	2.0
Wyre and Preston North	Anne Power	1,699	3.4
Wythenshawe and Sale East	Jess Mayo	1,658	3.8
Yeovil	Emily McIvor	2,191	3.9
York Central	Jonathan Tyler	4,791	10.1
York Outer	Ginnie Shaw	2,558	4.8

=== General election 2017 ===
In the 2017 general election, Green candidates stood in 457 seats across the UK, standing down in some seats to improve the chances of another progressive candidate.

Deposits were saved in 8 seats: Brighton Pavilion (seat held), Isle of Wight, Buckingham, Bristol West, Sheffield Central, Skipton & Ripon, North Herefordshire and North East Hertfordshire (their sister party, the Scottish Green Party, also saved one deposit in Glasgow North). This was down from 123 saved deposits in 2015. The party lost over half its vote compared to 2015, falling from 1,156,149 votes (3.8%) to 524,604 (1.6%). The party also saw significant declines in its share of the vote in target seats, such as in Bristol West (-13.9%), Norwich South (-11%), and Sheffield Central (-7.8%). It also fell behind Labour in the Isle of Wight. In total, the Green vote fell in 561 constituencies, and rose in 22.

Constituency	Candidate	Votes	%	Place
Aldershot	Donna Wallace	1,090	2.23%	5
Altrincham and Sale West	Geraldine Coggins	1,000	1.89%	4
Amber Valley	Matt McGuinness	650	1.42%	4
Arundel and South Downs	Johanna Prior	2,542	4.22%	4
Ashfield	Arran Rangi	398	0.80%	6
Ashford	Mandy Rossi	1,402	2.34%	5
Ashton-Under-Lyne	Andy Hunter-Rossall	534	1.34%	5
Aylesbury	Coral Simpson	1,237	2.11%	5
Banbury	Ian Middleton	1,225	1.99%	5
Barking	Shannon Butterfield	724	1.52%	4
Barnsley Central	Richard Trotman	570	1.46%	4
Barrow and Furness	Rob O'Hara	375	0.79%	5
Basingstoke	Richard Winter	1,106	1.98%	5
Bath	Eleanor Field	1,126	2.27%	4
Batley and Spen	Alan Freeman	695	1.29%	5
Battersea	Lois Davis	866	1.57%	5
Beaconsfield	Russell Secker	1,396	2.49%	5
Beckenham	Ruth Fabricant	1,380	2.67%	4
Bedford	Lucy Bywater	1,008	2.08%	4
Bermondsey and Old Southwark	John Tyson	639	1.09%	5
Berwick-Upon-Tweed	Thomas Stewart	787	1.86%	4
Bethnal Green and Bow	Alistair Polson	1,516	2.53%	5
Beverley and Holderness	Richard Howarth	716	1.36%	5
Bexhill and Battle	Jonathan Kent	1,438	2.42%	5
Bexleyheath and Crayford	Ivor Lobo	601	1.33%	5
Birkenhead	Jayne Clough	943	2.16%	4
Birmingham, Edgbaston	Alice Kiff	562	1.29%	4
Birmingham, Erdington	James Lovatt	610	1.64%	4
Birmingham, Hall Green	Patrick Cox	831	1.53%	4
Birmingham, Hodge Hill	Clare Thomas	387	0.83%	5
Birmingham, Ladywood	Kefentse Dennis	533	1.29%	4
Birmingham, Northfield	Eleanor Masters	864	1.95%	4
Birmingham, Perry Barr	Vijay Rana	591	1.34%	5
Birmingham, Selly Oak	Julien Pritchard	876	1.79%	4
Birmingham, Yardley	Christopher Garghan	280	0.63%	5
Blackley and Broughton	David Jones	462	1.15%	5
Blackpool North and Cleveleys	Duncan Royle	381	0.93%	5
Blackpool South	John Warnock	341	0.98%	5
Blaydon	Paul McNally	583	1.21%	5
Blyth Valley	Dawn Furness	918	2.16%	4
Bognor Regis and Littlehampton	Andrew Bishop	993	1.93%	6
Bolton North East	Liz Spencer	357	0.79%	5
Bolton South East	Alan Johnson	537	1.27%	5
Bootle	Alison Gibbon	709	1.41%	5
Boston and Skegness	Victoria Percival	547	1.28%	5
Bosworth	Mick Gregg	1,047	1.86%	4
Bournemouth East	Alasdair Keddie	1,236	2.54%	5
Bournemouth West	Simon Bull	1,247	2.80%	4
Bradford East	Andy Stanford	289	0.63%	7
Bradford South	Darren Parkinson	370	0.90%	6
Bradford West	Celia Hickson	481	1.06%	6
Braintree	Thomas Pashby	916	1.75%	5
Brent Central	Shaka Lish	802	1.53%	4
Brent North	Michaela Lichten	660	1.17%	4
Brentwood and Ongar	Paul Jeater	915	1.73%	5
Bridgwater and West Somerset	Kay Powell	1,059	1.82%	5
Brigg and Goole	Isabel Pires	550	1.22%	5
Brighton, Pavilion	Caroline Lucas	30,149	52.25%	1
Bristol East	Lorraine Francis	1,110	2.19%	4
Bristol North West	Sharmila Bousa	1,243	2.30%	4
Bristol South	Tony Dyer	1,428	2.63%	5
Bristol West	Molly Scott Cato	9,216	12.87%	3
Broadland	Andrew Boswell	932	1.67%	5
Bromley and Chislehurst	Roisin Robertson	1,150	2.46%	5
Bromsgrove	Giovanni Esposito	1,139	2.10%	4
Broxbourne	Tabitha Evans	848	1.79%	5
Broxtowe	Pat Morton	681	1.23%	5
Buckingham	Michael Sheppard	8,574	16.28%	2
Burnley	Laura Fisk	461	1.14%	5
Burton	Simon Hales	824	1.65%	4
Bury St Edmunds	Helen Geake	2,596	4.18%	4
Caerphilly	Andrew Creak	447	1.08%	6
Calder Valley	Kieran Turner	631	1.09%	6
Camberwell and Peckham	Eleanor Margolies	1,627	2.83%	4
Camborne and Redruth	Geoff Garbett	1,052	2.17%	4
Cambridge	Stuart Tuckwood	1,265	2.26%	4
Cannock Chase	Paul Woodhead	815	1.70%	4
Canterbury	Henry Stanton	1282	2.26%	4
Cardiff Central	Benjamin Smith	420	1.04%	5
Cardiff South and Penarth	Anthony Slaughter	532	1.05%	6
Carshalton and Wallington	Shasha Khan	501	0.99%	4
Central Devon	Andy Williamson	1,531	2.65%	4
Central Suffolk and North Ipswich	Regan Scott	1,659	2.90%	4
Ceredigion	Grenville Ham	542	1.36%	6
Charnwood	Nicholas Cox	1,036	1.96%	5
Chatham and Aylesford	Bernard Hyde	573	1.28%	5
Chelmsford	Reza Hossain	821	1.44%	5
Chelsea and Fulham	Bill Cashmore	807	1.92%	4
Cheltenham	Adam Van Coevorden	943	1.65%	4
Chesham and Amersham	Alan Booth	1,660	3.00%	4
Chesterfield	David Wadsworth	777	1.62%	5
Chichester	Heather Barrie	1,992	3.32%	4
Chingford and Woodford Green	Sinead King	1,204	2.56%	4
Chipping Barnet	Phil Fletcher	1,406	2.54%	4
Chorley	Peter Lageard	530	0.95%	4
Christchurch	Chris Rigby	1,325	2.61%	4
Cities of London and Westminster	Lawrence McNally	821	2.12%	4
City of Durham	Jonathan Elmer	797	1.65%	5
Clacton	Chris Southall	719	1.66%	5
Cleethorpes	Loyd Emmerson	470	0.98%	5
Colchester	Mark Goacher	828	1.55%	4
Colne Valley	Sonia King	892	1.50%	4
Congleton	Alexander Heath	999	1.78%	5
Corby	Steven Scrutton	579	0.97%	5
Coventry North East	Matthew Handley	502	1.08%	5
Coventry North West	Stephen Gray	666	1.34%	6
Coventry South	Aimee Challenor	604	1.28%	5
Croydon Central	Tracey Hague	626	1.10%	5
Croydon North	Peter Underwood	983	1.65%	4
Croydon South	Catherine Shelley	1,125	1.84%	4
Dagenham and Rainham	Denis Breading	544	1.19%	4
Darlington	Matthew Snedker	524	1.17%	5
Dartford	Andrew Blatchford	807	1.49%	5
Daventry	Jamie Wildman	957	1.72%	5
Denton and Reddish	Gareth Hayes	486	1.23%	5
Derby South	Ian Sleeman	454	1.00%	5
Derbyshire Dales	Matthew Buckler	1,002	2.02%	4
Devizes	Emma Dawnay	1,606	3.17%	5
Dewsbury	Simon Cope	1,024	1.81%	4
Dover	Beccy Sawbridge	923	1.78%	5
Dudley North	Andrew Nixon	240	0.62%	5
Dudley South	Jenny Maxwell	382	1.00%	5
Dulwich and West Norwood	Rashid Nix	1,408	2.51%	4
Ealing North	Meena Hans	743	1.41%	5
Ealing, Southall	Peter Ward	1,037	2.30%	4
Easington	Martie Warin	410	1.13%	6
East Ham	Chidi Oti-Obihara	474	0.84%	5
East Hampshire	Richard Knight	1,760	3.18%	4
East Surrey	Benedict Southworth	1,100	1.86%	6
East Worthing and Shoreham	Leslie Groves Williams	1,273	2.40%	5
East Yorkshire	Michael Jackson	943	1.75%	6
Eastbourne	Alex Hough	510	0.89%	4
Eastleigh	Ron Meldrum	750	1.31%	5
Eddisbury	Mark Green	785	1.53%	5
Edmonton	Benjamin Gill	633	1.45%	5
Ellesmere Port and Neston	Steven Baker	342	0.67%	5
Elmet and Rothwell	Dylan Brown	995	1.67%	5
Enfield North	Bill Linton	574	1.18%	5
Enfield, Southgate	David Flint	780	1.61%	4
Epping Forest	Simon Heap	1,233	2.43%	5
Epsom and Ewell	Janice Baker	1,714	2.89%	4
Erewash	Ralph Hierons	675	1.36%	4
Erith and Thamesmead	Claudine Letsae	507	1.14%	5
Esher and Walton	Olivia Palmer	1,074	1.79%	4
Exeter	Joe Levy	1,027	1.85%	4
Fareham	Miles Grindey	1,302	2.28%	5
Faversham and Mid Kent	Alastair Gould	1,431	2.88%	5
Feltham and Heston	Tony Firkins	809	1.52%	5
Filton and Bradley Stoke	Diana Warner	1,162	2.29%	4
Finchley and Golders Green	Adele Ward	919	1.75%	4
Folkestone and Hythe	Martin Whybrow	2,498	4.25%	5
Forest of Dean	James Greenwood	1,241	2.40%	4
Fylde	Tina Rothery	1,263	2.72%	4
Gainsborough	Vicky Pearson	1,238	2.41%	4
Garston and Halewood	Lawrence Brown	750	1.40%	4
Gateshead	Andy Redfern	611	1.45%	4
Gedling	Rebecca Connick	515	1.00%	5
Gillingham and Rainham	Clive Gregory	520	1.06%	5
Gloucester	Gerald Hartley	754	1.39%	5
Gosport	Monica Cassidy	1,024	2.07%	5
Grantham and Stamford	Rebecca Thackray	782	1.38%	6
Gravesham	Marna Gilligan	723	1.48%	5
Great Yarmouth	Harry Webb	563	1.28%	5
Greenwich and Woolwich	Daniel Garrun	1,605	3.02%	4
Guildford	Mark Bray-Parry	1,152	2.08%	4
Hackney North and Stoke Newington	Alastair Binnie-Lubbock	2,606	4.63%	4
Hackney South and Shoreditch	Rebecca Johnson	1,522	2.75%	4
Halesowen and Rowley Regis	James Robertson	440	0.99%	5
Haltemprice and Howden	Carole Needham	711	1.38%	5
Hammersmith	Alex Horn	800	1.53%	4
Hampstead and Kilburn	John Mansook	742	1.27%	4
Harborough	Darren Woodiwiss	1,110	1.93%	5
Harlow	Hannah Clare	660	1.47%	5
Harrow East	Emma Wallace	771	1.52%	4
Harrow West	Rowan Langley	652	1.29%	4
Harwich and North Essex	Blake Roberts	1,042	2.04%	5
Havant	Tim Dawes	1,122	2.42%	5
Hayes and Harlington	John Bowman	571	1.19%	5
Hazel Grove	Robbie Lee	516	1.17%	4
Hemel Hempstead	Sherief Hassan	1,024	1.96%	4
Hendon	Carmen Legarda	578	1.11%	4
Henley	Robin Bennett	1,864	3.26%	4
Hereford and South Herefordshire	Diana Toynbee	1,220	2.42%	5
Hertford and Stortford	David Woolcombe	1,814	3.02%	4
Hertsmere	Sophie Summerhayes	990	1.89%	5
Hexham	Wesley Foot	1,253	2.71%	4
Hitchin and Harpenden	Richard Cano	1,329	2.26%	4
Holborn and St Pancras	Siân Berry	1,980	3.36%	4
Hornchurch and Upminster	Peter Caton	1,077	1.92%	5
Hornsey and Wood Green	Sam Hall	1,181	1.90%	4
Horsham	Catherine Ross	1,844	2.97%	4
Houghton and Sunderland South	Richard Bradley	725	1.74%	5
Hove	Phelim Mac Cafferty	971	1.69%	4
Huddersfield	Andrew Cooper	1,395	3.18%	3
Huntingdon	Tom MacLennan	1,095	1.83%	5
Ilford South	RoseMary Warrington	542	0.94%	4
Ipswich	Charlotte Armstrong	840	1.65%	5
Isle of Wight	Vix Lowthion	12,915	17.34%	3
Islington North	Caroline Russell	2,229	4.04%	4
Islington South and Finsbury	Benali Hamdache	1,198	2.49%	4
Jarrow	David Herbert	745	1.73%	5
Keighley	Ros Brown	790	1.53%	5
Kenilworth and Southam	Rob Ballantyne	1,133	2.21%	4
Kensington	Jennifer Nadel	767	1.98%	4
Kettering	Rob Reeves	1,116	2.26%	4
Kingston and Surbiton	Chris Walker	536	0.86%	5
Kingston upon Hull East	Julia Brown	493	1.35%	5
Kingston upon Hull North	Martin Deane	604	1.74%	5
Kingston upon Hull West and Hessle	Mike Lammiman	332	0.96%	6
Kingswood	Matt Furey-King	984	2.02%	4
Knowsley	Steve Baines	521	0.94%	5
Lancaster and Fleetwood	Rebecca Novell	796	1.73%	4
Leeds Central	Ed Carlisle	1,189	2.49%	4
Leeds East	Jaimes Moran	434	1.05%	5
Leeds North East	Ann Forsaith	680	1.28%	4
Leeds North West	Martin Hemingway	582	1.26%	4
Leeds West	Andrew Pointon	1,023	2.42%	4
Leicester East	Melanie Wakley	1,070	2.04%	5
Leicester South	Mags Lewis	1,177	2.33%	4
Leicester West	Mel Gould	607	1.62%	5
Lewisham East	Storm Poorun	803	1.70%	4
Lewisham West and Penge	Karen Wheller	1,144	2.15%	4
Lewisham, Deptford	John Coughlin	1640	2.98%	4
Leyton and Wanstead	Ashley Gunstock	1,351	2.93%	4
Lichfield	Robert Pass	1,416	2.65%	4
Lincoln	Benjamin Loryman	583	1.20%	5
Liverpool, Riverside	Stephanie Pitchers	1,582	3.29%	3
Liverpool, Walton	Colm Feeley	523	1.24%	5
Liverpool, Wavertree	Ted Grant	598	1.37%	4
Liverpool, West Derby	Will Ward	329	0.73%	5
Loughborough	Philip Leicester	971	1.79%	5
Ludlow	Hilary Wendt	1,054	2.11%	4
Luton North	Simon Hall	648	1.39%	4
Luton South	Marc Scheimann	439	0.95%	5
Macclesfield	James Booth	1,213	2.23%	4
Maidenhead	Derek Wall	907	1.56%	4
Maidstone and The Weald	Stuart Jeffery	888	1.72%	5
Maldon	Steven Betteridge	1,073	2.14%	5
Manchester Central	Rachael Shah	846	1.70%	5
Manchester, Gorton	Jess Mayo	1,038	2.26%	5
Manchester, Withington	Laura Bannister	865	1.61%	4
Meon Valley	Andrew Hayward	1,301	2.40%	5
Meriden	Alison Gavin	1,416	2.59%	5
Mid Bedfordshire	Gareth Ellis	1,794	2.84%	4
Mid Derbyshire	Sue MacFarlane	1,168	2.32%	4
Mid Norfolk	Hannah Lester	1,158	2.08%	5
Mid Sussex	Chris Jerrey	1,571	2.55%	4
Mid Worcestershire	Fay Whitfield	1,371	2.49%	5
Middlesbrough	Carl Martinez	250	0.70%	6
Milton Keynes North	Alan Francis	1,107	1.73%	5
Milton Keynes South	Graham Findlay	1,179	1.83%	5
Mitcham and Morden	Laura Collins	644	1.34%	5
Mole Valley	Jacquetta Fewster	1,463	2.58%	4
Monmouth	Ian Chandler	954	1.92%	5
Montgomeryshire	Richard Chaloner	524	1.50%	5
Morecambe and Lunesdale	Cait Sinclair	478	1.05%	5
New Forest East	Henry Mellor	1,251	2.44%	4
New Forest West	Janet Richards	1,454	2.93%	4
Newbury	Paul Field	1,531	2.52%	4
Newcastle upon Tyne Central	Peter Thomson	595	1.60%	5
Newcastle upon Tyne East	Alistair Ford	755	1.81%	5
Newcastle upon Tyne North	Alison Whalley	513	1.06%	5
Newport West	Pippa Bartolotti	497	1.14%	6
Newton Abbot	Kathryn Driscoll	926	1.79%	4
North Devon	Ricky Knight	753	1.35%	5
North Dorset	John Tutton	1,607	2.88%	4
North East Bedfordshire	Philippa Fleming	1,215	1.89%	5
North East Cambridgeshire	Ruth Johnson	1,024	1.92%	5
North East Derbyshire	David Kesteven	719	1.43%	5
North East Hampshire	Chas Spradbery	1,476	2.56%	4
North East Hertfordshire	Tim Lee	2,965	5.33%	4
North East Somerset	Sally Calverley	1,245	2.30%	4
North Herefordshire	Ellie Chowns	2,771	5.52%	4
North Shropshire	Duncan Kerr	1,722	3.10%	4
North Somerset	Charley Pattison	1,976	3.19%	5
North Swindon	Andy Bentley	858	1.56%	5
North Thanet	Ed Targett	825	1.71%	5
North Tyneside	Martin Collins	669	1.29%	5
North Warwickshire	Keith Kondakor	940	1.99%	4
North West Cambridgeshire	Greg Guthrie	1,255	1.96%	5
North West Durham	Dominic Horsman	530	1.11%	5
North West Hampshire	Dan Hill	1,334	2.27%	5
North West Leicestershire	Mia Woolley	1,101	2.06%	4
North West Norfolk	Andrew de Whalley	851	1.74%	5
North Wiltshire	Phil Chamberlain	1,141	2.10%	4
Northampton North	Steve Miller	636	1.58%	5
Northampton South	Scott Mabbutt	696	1.70%	5
Norwich North	Adrian Holmes	782	1.70%	4
Norwich South	Richard Bearman	1,492	2.91%	4
Nottingham East	Kat Boettge	698	1.77%	5
Nottingham North	Kirsty Jones	538	1.40%	5
Nottingham South	Adam McGregor	598	1.24%	5
Nuneaton	Chris Brookes	763	1.66%	5
Old Bexley and Sidcup	Derek Moran	820	1.71%	5
Oldham West and Royton	Adam King	439	1.00%	5
Orpington	Tamara Galloway	1,060	2.10%	5
Oxford East	Larry Sanders	1,785	3.31%	4
Pendle	Ian Barnett	502	1.12%	5
Penrith and The Border	Douglas Lawson	1,029	2.21%	5
Peterborough	Fiona Radic	848	1.78%	4
Plymouth, Moor View	Joshua Pope	536	1.18%	5
Plymouth, Sutton and Devonport	Daniel Sheaff	604	1.17%	5
Poole	Adrian Oliver	1,299	2.61%	4
Poplar and Limehouse	Bethan Lant	989	1.67%	5
Portsmouth North	Ken Hawkins	791	1.68%	5
Portsmouth South	Ian McCulloch	712	1.60%	5
Preston	Anne Power	348	0.97%	5
Putney	Ben Fletcher	1,107	2.36%	4
Rayleigh and Wickford	Paul Hill	1,062	1.92%	5
Reading East	Kizzi Johannessen	1,093	1.98%	4
Reading West	Jamie Whitham	979	1.89%	4
Redditch	Kevin White	380	0.84%	6
Reigate	Jonathan Essex	2,214	4.11%	4
Ribble Valley	Graham Sowter	1,314	2.38%	4
Richmond (Yorks)	Fiona Yorke	1,739	3.05%	5
Rochester and Strood	Sonia Hyner	781	1.48%	5
Rochford and Southend East	Simon Cross	804	1.70%	6
Romford	David Hughes	815	1.63%	5
Romsey and Southampton North	Ian Callaghan	953	1.90%	4
Rossendale and Darwen	John Payne	824	1.64%	4
Rother Valley	Paul Martin	869	1.76%	5
Rugby	Graham Bliss	953	1.86%	4
Ruislip, Northwood and Pinner	Sarah Green	1,268	2.41%	4
Runnymede and Weybridge	Lee-Anne Lawrance	1,347	2.61%	5
Rushcliffe	Richard Mallender	1,626	2.79%	4
Rutland and Melton	Alastair McQuillan	1,755	3.05%	5
Salford and Eccles	Wendy Olsen	809	1.70%	5
Salisbury	Brig Oubridge	1,152	2.16%	5
Scarborough and Whitby	David Malone	915	1.81%	5
Sedgefield	Melissa Wilson	686	1.65%	5
Sefton Central	Mike Carter	656	1.26%	4
Sevenoaks	Philip Dodd	1,673	3.27%	5
Sheffield Central	Natalie Bennett	3,848	8.04%	3
Sheffield, Brightside and Hillsborough	Christine Gilligan Kubo	737	1.76%	5
Sheffield, Hallam	Logan Robin	823	1.44%	5
Sheffield, Heeley	Declan Walsh	943	2.13%	5
Sherwood	Mo Findley	664	1.24%	5
Shrewsbury and Atcham	Emma Bullard	1,067	1.83%	5
Sittingbourne and Sheppey	Mark Lindop	558	1.09%	5
Skipton and Ripon	Andy Brown	3,734	6.42%	3
Sleaford and North Hykeham	Fiona McKenna	968	1.47%	5
Solihull	Max McLoughlin	1,157	2.04%	5
Somerton and Frome	Theo Simon	2,347	3.22%	4
South Basildon and East Thurrock	Sim Harman	680	1.44%	5
South Cambridgeshire	Simon Saggers	1,512	2.33%	4
South Derbyshire	Marten Kats	917	1.74%	4
South Dorset	Jon Orrell	2,278	4.39%	4
South East Cornwall	Martin Corney	1,335	2.51%	4
South Holland and The Deepings	Daniel Wilshire	894	1.78%	5
South Leicestershire	Mary Morgan	1,092	1.93%	5
South Norfolk	Catherine Rowett	1,555	2.54%	4
South Northamptonshire	Denise Donaldson	1,357	2.09%	5
South Ribble	Andrew Wight	494	0.90%	5
South Shields	Shirley Ford	1,437	3.52%	4
South Staffordshire	Claire McIlvenna	1,182	2.31%	4
South Suffolk	Robert Lindsay	1,723	3.18%	4
South Swindon	Talis Kimberley-Fairbourn	747	1.46%	5
South Thanet	Trevor Roper	809	1.63%	5
South West Bedfordshire	Morvern Rennie	950	1.71%	4
South West Devon	Win Scutt	1,133	2.14%	5
South West Hertfordshire	Paul De Hoest	1,576	2.60%	4
South West Wiltshire	Christopher Walford	1,445	2.64%	4
Southampton, Itchen	Rosie Pearce	725	1.55%	5
Southend West	Dominic Ellis	831	1.76%	5
Spelthorne	Paul Jacobs	1,105	2.20%	5
St Albans	Jack Easton	828	1.45%	4
St Helens North	Rachel Parkinson	1,220	2.43%	5
St Helens South and Whiston	Jess Northey	1,417	2.68%	5
Stafford	Tony Pearce	1,265	2.44%	4
Staffordshire Moorlands	Mike Shone	541	1.21%	5
Stalybridge and Hyde	Julie Wood	991	2.33%	4
Stevenage	Victoria Snelling	1,085	2.20%	4
Stockport	Gary Lawson	591	1.42%	5
Stockton North	Emma Robson	358	0.84%	5
Stockton South	Jo Fitzgerald	371	0.69%	5
Stoke-on-Trent Central	Adam Colclough	378	1.14%	5
Stoke-on-Trent North	Douglas Rouxel	685	1.64%	4
Stoke-on-Trent South	Jan Zablocki	643	1.54%	4
Stone	Samantha Pancheri	707	1.41%	5
Stourbridge	Andi Mohr	493	1.05%	5
Stratford-on-Avon	Dominic Giles	1,345	2.56%	4
Streatham	Nicole Griffiths	1,696	3.04%	4
Stretford and Urmston	Michael Ingleson	641	1.28%	5
Stroud	Sarah Lunnon	1,423	2.23%	4
Suffolk Coastal	Eamonn O'Nolan	1,802	3.10%	4
Sunderland Central	Rachel Featherstone	705	1.56%	5
Surrey Heath	Sharon Galliford	2,258	3.91%	4
Sutton and Cheam	Claire Jackson-Prior	871	1.68%	4
Sutton Coldfield	David Ratcliff	965	1.83%	4
Swansea East	Chris Evans	359	1.02%	6
Swansea West	Mike Whittall	434	1.16%	5
Tatton	Nigel Hennerley	1,024	2.08%	4
Taunton Deane	Clive Martin	1,151	1.83%	5
Telford	Luke Shirley	898	2.01%	4
Tewkesbury	Cate Cody	1,576	2.67%	4
The Cotswolds	Sabrina Poole	1,747	2.93%	4
The Wrekin	Pat McCarthy	804	1.62%	5
Thirsk and Malton	Martin Brampton	1,100	1.97%	5
Thornbury and Yate	Iain Hamilton	633	1.25%	4
Tiverton and Honiton	Gill Westcott	2,035	3.52%	4
Tonbridge and Malling	April Clark	2,335	4.10%	4
Tooting	Esther Obiri-Darko	845	1.45%	4
Torbay	Sam Moss	652	1.27%	5
Torridge and West Devon	Chris Jordan	1,622	2.73%	4
Totnes	Jacqi Hodgson	2,097	4.17%	4
Tottenham	Jarelle Francis	1,276	2.59%	4
Truro and Falmouth	Amanda Pennington	831	1.47%	5
Tunbridge Wells	Trevor Bisdee	1,441	2.66%	5
Tynemouth	Julia Erskine	629	1.11%	5
Uxbridge and South Ruislip	Mark Keir	884	1.89%	5
Vale of Glamorgan	Stephen Davis-Barker	419	0.78%	6
Vauxhall	Gulnar Hasnain	1,152	2.09%	4
Wallasey	Lily Clough	637	1.32%	5
Walthamstow	Andrew Johns	1,190	2.48%	4
Wansbeck	Steven Leyland	715	1.68%	5
Wantage	Sue Ap-Roberts	1,546	2.43%	4
Warley	Mark Redding	555	1.38%	5
Warrington North	Lyndsay McAteer	619	1.28%	5
Warwick and Leamington	Jonathan Chilvers	1,198	2.22%	4
Washington and Sunderland West	Michal Chantkowski	514	1.27%	5
Watford	Alex Murray	721	1.23%	5
Waveney	Elfrede Brambley-Crawshaw	1,332	2.53%	4
Wealden	Colin Stocks	1,959	3.24%	4
Weaver Vale	Christopher Copeman	786	1.55%	4
Wellingborough	Jonathan Hornett	956	1.80%	5
Welwyn Hatfield	Christianne Sayers	835	1.62%	5
West Bromwich East	John Macefield	533	1.36%	4
West Bromwich West	Robert Buckman	323	0.89%	5
West Dorset	Kelvin Clayton	1,631	2.74%	4
West Ham	Michael Spracklin	957	1.58%	5
West Lancashire	Nate Higgins	680	1.25%	4
West Suffolk	Donald Allwright	935	1.81%	5
West Worcestershire	Natalie McVey	1,605	2.84%	4
Westminster North	Emmanuelle Tandy	595	1.37%	4
Weston-Super-Mare	Suneil Basu	888	1.57%	5
Wigan	William Patterson	753	1.58%	5
Wimbledon	Charles Barraball	1,231	2.39%	4
Winchester	Andrew Wainwright	846	1.48%	4
Windsor	Fintan McKeown	1,435	2.66%	4
Wirral South	Mandi Roberts	454	1.00%	4
Wirral West	John Coyne	429	0.98%	4
Witham	James Abbott	1,832	3.72%	4
Witney	Claire Lasko	1,053	1.73%	4
Woking	James Brierley	1,092	1.98%	5
Wokingham	Russell Seymour	1,364	2.29%	4
Wolverhampton North East	Clive Wood	482	1.32%	5
Wolverhampton South East	Amy Bertaut	421	1.16%	5
Wolverhampton South West	Andrea Cantrill	579	1.37%	5
Worcester	Louis Stephen	1,211	2.36%	5
Worsley and Eccles South	Tom Dylan	842	1.84%	4
Worthing West	Benjamin Cornish	1,614	2.96%	4
Wycombe	Peter Sims	1,182	2.21%	5
Wyre and Preston North	Ruth Norbury	973	1.85%	4
Wyre Forest	Brett Caulfield	1,025	2.00%	5
Wythenshawe and Sale East	Dan Jerrome	576	1.26%	5
Yeovil	Robert Wood	1,052	1.77%	4
York Outer	Bethan Vincent	1,094	1.91%	4

=== General election 2019 ===
In the 2019 general election, Green candidates stood in 469 seats across England and Wales, standing down in several seats to enable tactical voting, including 50 constituencies as part of the Unite to Remain campaign. Deposits were saved in 29 seats, up from the eight saved in the 2017 election. As well as holding the seat of Brighton Pavilion, the party came second in two seats (Bristol West and Dulwich and West Norwood) and third in 12 constituencies.

Constituency	Candidate	Votes	%	Place
Aberavon	Giorgia Finney	450	1.4%	7
Aldershot	Donna Wallace	1,750	3.7%	4
Aldridge-Brownhills	Bill McComish	771	2.0%	4
Altrincham and Sale West	Geraldine Coggins	1,566	2.9%	4
Amber Valley	Lian Pizzey	1,388	3.0%	4
Arundel and South Downs	Isabel Thurston	2,519	4.1%	4
Ashfield	Rose Woods	674	1.4%	6
Ashford	Mandy Rossi	2,638	4.4%	4
Ashton-under-Lyne	Lee Huntbach	1,208	3.1%	5
Aylesbury	Coral Simpson	2,394	4.0%	4
Banbury	Ian Middleton	2,607	4.1%	4
Barking	Shannon Butterfield	820	1.8%	4
Barnsley Central	Tom Heyes	900	2.4%	5
Barnsley East	Richard Trotman	922	2.4%	5
Barrow and Furness	Chris Loynes	703	1.5%	5
Basildon and Billericay	Stewart Goshawk	1,395	3.2%	4
Basingstoke	Jonnie Jenkin	2,138	3.9%	4
Batley and Spen	Ty Akram	692	1.3%	6
Battersea	Lois Davis	1,529	2.5%	4
Beaconsfield	Zoe Hatch	2,033	3.5%	4
Beckenham	Ruth Fabricant	2,055	4.1%	4
Bedford	Adrian Spurrel	960	2.0%	4
Berwick-upon-Tweed	Thomas Stewart	1,394	3.3%	4
Bethnal Green and Bow	Shahrar Ali	2,570	4.2%	4
Beverley and Holderness	Isabel Pires	1,378	2.6%	5
Bexhill and Battle	Jonathan Kent	2,692	4.6%	4
Bexleyheath and Crayford	Tony Ball	1,298	3.0%	4
Birkenhead	Pat Cleary	1,405	3.3%	6
Birmingham Edgbaston	Phil Simpson	1,112	2.6%	4
Birmingham Erdington	Rob Grant	648	1.8%	5
Birmingham Hall Green	Patrick Cox	818	1.5%	6
Birmingham Hodge Hill	Sylvia McKears	328	0.7%	5
Birmingham Ladywood	Alex Nettle	931	2.2%	4
Birmingham Northfield	Eleanor Masters	954	2.2%	5
Birmingham Perry Barr	Kefentse Dennis	845	2.0%	5
Birmingham Selly Oak	Joe Peacock	1,848	3.7%	4
Birmingham Yardley	Christopher Garghan	579	1.4%	5
Blackburn	Reza Hossain	751	1.7%	5
Blackley and Broughton	David Jones	920	2.4%	5
Blackpool North and Cleveleys	Duncan Royle	735	1.9%	4
Blackpool South	Becky Daniels	563	1.7%	5
Blaenau Gwent	Stephen Priestnall	386	1.3%	6
Blaydon	Diane Cadman	1,279	2.8%	5
Blyth Valley	Dawn Furness	1,146	2.8%	5
Bognor Regis and Littlehampton	Carol Birch	1,826	3.6%	4
Bolsover	David Kesteven	758	1.7%	5
Bolton North East	Liz Spencer	689	1.6%	5
Bolton South East	David Figgins	791	1.9%	5
Bolton West	Paris Hayes	939	1.9%	4
Bootle	Mike Carter	1,166	2.4%	5
Bosworth	Mick Gregg	1,502	2.7%	4
Bournemouth East	Alasdair Keddie	2,049	4.2%	4
Bournemouth West	Simon Bull	2,096	4.6%	4
Bracknell	Derek Florey	2,089	3.8%	4
Bradford East	Andy Stanford	662	1.5%	5
Bradford South	Matthew Edwards	983	2.5%	5
Bradford West	Darren Parkinson	813	1.8%	5
Brent Central	William Relton	1,600	3.3%	4
Brent North	Simon Rebbitt	850	1.6%	5
Brentford and Isleworth	Daniel Goldsmith	1,829	3.1%	4
Brentwood and Ongar	Paul Jeater	1,679	3.2%	4
Bridgend	Alex Harris	815	1.9%	6
Bridgwater and West Somerset	Mickie Ritchie	1,877	3.3%	4
Brigg and Goole	Jo Baker	1,281	3.0%	4
Brighton Kemptown	Alexandra Phillips	2,237	4.6%	4
Brighton Pavilion	Caroline Lucas	33,151	57.2%	1
Bristol East	Concan Connolly	2,106	4.0%	4
Bristol North West	Heather Mack	1,977	3.5%	4
Bristol South	Tony Dyer	2,713	4.9%	4
Bristol West	Carla Denyer	18,809	24.9%	2
Broadland	Andrew Boswell	1,412	2.5%	4
Bromley and Chislehurst	Mary Ion	1,546	3.4%	4
Bromsgrove	Kevin White	1,783	3.3%	4
Broxbourne	Nicholas Cox	1,281	2.7%	4
Burnley	Laura Fisk	739	1.9%	6
Burton	Kate Copeland	1,433	2.9%	4
Bury North	Charlie Allen	802	1.8%	5
Bury South	Glyn Heath	848	1.7%	6
Bury St Edmunds	Helen Geake	9,711	15.7%	3
Camberwell and Peckham	Claire Sheppard	3,501	6.2%	4
Camborne and Redruth	Karen La Borde	1,359	2.7%	4
Cambridge	Jeremy Caddick	2,164	4.0%	4
Cannock Chase	Paul Woodhead	2,920	6.3%	3
Cardiff North	Michael Cope	820	1.6%	6
Cardiff South and Penarth	Ken Barker	1,182	2.3%	6
Cardiff West	David Griffin	1,133	2.5%	6
Carshalton and Wallington	Tracey Hague	759	1.5%	5
Central Devon	Andy Williamson	2,833	4.9%	4
Central Suffolk and North Ipswich	Daniel Pratt	2,650	4.7%	4
Ceredigion	Chris Simpson	663	1.7%	6
Charnwood	Laurie Needham	2,664	4.8%	4
Chatham and Aylesford	Geoff Wilkinson	1,090	2.5%	4
Chesham and Amersham	Alan Booth	3,042	5.5%	4
Chesterfield	Neil Jackson	1,148	2.5%	5
Chichester	Heathre Barrie	2,527	4.1%	4
Chipping Barnet	Gabrielle Bailey	1,288	2.2%	4
Chorley	James Melling	3,600	9.0%	3
Christchurch	Chris Rigby	2,212	4.3%	4
Cities of London and Westminster	Zack Polanski	728	1.7%	4
City of Chester	Nicholas Brown	1,438	2.6%	4
City of Durham	Jonathan Elmer	1,635	3.3%	5
Clacton	Chris Southall	1,225	2.8%	4
Cleethorpes	Jodi Shanahan	1,284	2.8%	4
Colchester	Mark Goacher	1,530	2.9%	4
Colne Valley	Darryl Gould	1,068	1.7%	5
Congleton	Richard McCarthy	1,616	2.8%	4
Copeland	Jack Lenox	765	1.8%	4
Coventry North East	Matthew Handley	1,141	2.6%	5
Coventry North West	Stephen Gray	1,443	3.0%	5
Coventry South	Becky Finlayson	1,092	2.4%	5
Crawley	Iain Dickson	1,451	2.9%	4
Crewe and Natwich	Te Ata Browne	975	1.8%	5
Croydon Central	Esther Sutton	1,215	2.2%	4
Croydon North	Rachel Chance	1,629	2.9%	4
Croydon South	Peter Underwood	1,782	3.0%	4
Dagenham and Rainham	Azzees Minot	602	1.4%	5
Darlington	Matthew Snedker	1,057	2.4%	5
Dartford	Mark Lindop	1,435	2.7%	4
Daventry	Clare Slater	2,341	4.1%	4
Denton and Reddish	Gary Lawson	1,124	2.9%	5
Derby North	Helen Hitchcock	1,046	2.2%	5
Derbyshire Dales	Matthew Buckler	2,058	4.1%	4
Devizes	Emma Dawnay	2,809	5.5%	4
Dewsbury	Simon Cope	1,060	1.9%	5
Don Valley	Kate Needham	872	1.9%	5
Doncaster Central	Frank Sheridan	981	2.4%	6
Dover	Beccy Sawbridge	1,371	2.7%	4
Dudley North	Mike Harrison	739	2.0%	4
Dudley South	Cate Mohr	863	2.4%	4
Dulwich and West Norwood	Jonathan Bartley	9,211	16.5%	2
Ealing Central and Acton	Kate Crossland	1,735	3.2%	4
Ealing North	Jeremy Parker	1,458	2.9%	4
Ealing Southall	Darren Moore	1,688	4.0%	4
East Devon	Henry Gent	711	1.1%	5
East Ham	Michael Spracklin	883	1.6%	5
East Hampshire	Zoe Parker	2,600	4.6%	4
East Surrey	Joseph Booton	2,340	3.9%	4
East Worthing and Shoreham	Leslie Williams	2,006	3.8%	4
East Yorkshire	Mike Jackson	1,675	3.2%	5
Eastleigh	Ron Meldrum	1,639	2.8%	4
Eddisbury	Louise Jewkes	1,191	2.2%	4
Edmonton	Benjamin Maydon	862	2.1%	4
Ellesmere Port and Neston	Chris Copeman	964	2.0%	5
Elmet and Rothwell	Penny Stables	1,775	3.1%	4
Eltham	Matthew Stratford	1,322	3.0%	5
Enfield North	Isobel Whittaker	1,115	2.5%	4
Enfield Southgate	Luke Balnave	1,042	2.2%	4
Epping Forest	Steven Neville	1,975	3.9%	4
Epsom and Ewell	Janice Baker	2,047	3.4%	4
Erewash	Brent Poland	1,115	2.3%	4
Erith and Thameshead	Claudine Letsae	867	2.1%	5
Exeter	Joe Levy	4,838	8.6%	3
Fareham	Nick Lyle	2,412	4.2%	4
Faversham and Mid Kent	Hannah Temple	2,103	4.2%	4
Feltham and Heston	Tony Firkins	1,133	2.4%	5
Filton and Bradley Stoke	Jenny Vernon	1,563	2.9%	4
Folkestone and Hythe	Georgina Treloar	2,706	4.6%	4
Forest of Dean	Chris McFarling	4,681	9.5%	3
Fylde	Gina Dowding	1,731	3.7%	4
Garston and Halewood	Jean-Paul Roberts	1,183	2.2%	5
Gateshead	Rachael Cabral	1,653	4.3%	4
Gedling	Jim Norris	1,097	2.2%	4
Gillingham and Rainham	George Salomon	1,043	2.3%	4
Gloucester	Michael Byfield	1,385	2.6%	4
Gosport	Zoe Aspinall	1,806	3.7%	4
Grantham and Stamford	Anne Gayfer	2,265	4.0%	4
Gravesham	Marna Gilligan	1,397	2.9%	4
Great Grimsby	Loyd Emmerson	514	1.6%	4
Great Yarmouth	Anne Killett	1,064	2.4%	4
Greenwich and Woolwich	Victoria Rance	2,363	4.4%	4
Hackney North and Stoke Newington	Alex Armitage	4,989	8.8%	3
Hackney South and Shoreditch	Tyrone Scott	2,948	5.4%	4
Halesowen and Rowley Regis	James Windridge	934	2.2%	4
Halton	David O'Keefe	982	2.1%	5
Hammersmith	Alex Horn	1,744	3.4%	4
Hampstead and Kilburn	David Stansell	1,608	2.8%	4
Harborough	Darren Woodiwiss	1,709	3.0%	4
Harrow West	Rowan Langley	1,109	2.3%	4
Harwich and North Essex	Peter Banks	1,945	3.7%	4
Havant	John Colman	1,597	3.5%	4
Hayes and Harlington	Christine West	739	1.7%	5
Hemel Hempstead	Sherief Hassan	1,581	3.1%	4
Hemsworth	Lyn Morton	916	2.1%	7
Hendon	Portia Vincent-Kirby	921	1.7%	4
Henley	Jo Robb	2,736	4.7%	4
Hereford and South Herefordshire	Diana Lagoutte	2,371	4.8%	4
Hertford and Stortford	Lucy Downes	2,705	4.5%	4
Hertsmere	John Humphries	1,653	3.2%	4
Hexham	Nick Morphet	1,723	3.7%	4
Heywood and Middleton	Nigel Ainsworth-Barnes	1,220	2.6%	5
High Peak	Robert Hodgetts-Hayley	1,148	2.1%	5
Holborn and St Pancras	Kirsten De Keyser	2,746	4.8%	4
Hornchurch and Upminster	Peter Caton	1,920	3.6%	4
Hornsey and Wood Green	Jarelle Francis	2,192	3.6%	4
Horsham	Catherine Ross	2,668	4.2%	4
Houghton and Sunderland South	Richard Bradley	1,125	2.8%	5
Hove	Oliver Sykes	2,496	4.4%	4
Huddersfield	Andrew Cooper	1,768	4.2%	4
Huntingdon	Daniel Laycock	2,233	3.8%	4
Hyndburn	Katrina Brockbank	845	2.0%	5
Ilford North	David Reynolds	845	1.7%	5
Ilford South	Rosemary Warrington	714	1.3%	6
Ipswich	Barry Broom	1,283	2.6%	5
Isle of Wight	Vix Lowthion	11,338	15.2%	3
Islington North	Caroline Russell	4,326	8.0%	4
Islington South and Finsbury	Talia Hussain	1,987	4.2%	4
Jarrow	James Milne	831	2.0%	6
Kenilworth and Southam	Alison Firth	2,351	4.5%	4
Kensington	Vivien Lichtenstein	535	1.2%	4
Kettering	Jamie Wildman	1,543	3.1%	5
Kingston and Surbiton	Sharron Sumner	1,038	1.7%	4
Kingston upon Hull East	Julia Brown	784	2.4%	5
Kingston upon Hull North	Richard Howarth	875	2.6%	5
Kingston upon Hull West and Hessle	Mike Lammiman	560	1.8%	5
Kingswood	Joseph Evans	1,200	2.4%	4
Knowsley	Paul Woodruff	1,262	2.2%	4
Lancaster and Fleetwood	Caroline Jackson	1,396	3.1%	5
Leeds Central	Ed Carlisle	2,105	4.3%	5
Leeds East	Shahab Adris	878	2.3%	5
Leeds North East	Rachel Hartshorne	1,931	3.8%	4
Leeds North West	Martin Hemingway	1,389	2.8%	4
Leeds West	Victoria Smith	1,274	3.2%	5
Leicester East	Melanie Wakley	888	1.8%	5
Leicester South	Magaret Lewis	1,669	3.3%	4
Leicester West	Anika Goddard	977	2.8%	5
Lewes	Johnny Denis	1,453	2.6%	4
Lewisham East	Rosamund Adoo-Kissi-Debrah	1,706	3.8%	4
Lewisham West and Penge	James Braun	2,390	4.6%	4
Leyton and Wanstead	Ashley Gunstock	1,805	4.1%	4
Lichfield	Andrea Muckley	1,743	3.3%	4
Lincoln	Sally Horscroft	1,195	2.4%	4
Liverpool Riverside	Tom Crone	3,017	5.7%	3
Liverpool Walton	Ted Grant	814	2.0%	3
Liverpool Wavertree	Kay Inckle	1,365	3.1%	5
Liverpool West Derby	William Ward	605	1.4%	6
Loughborough	Wesley Walton	1,504	2.8%	4
Ludlow	Hilary Wendt	1,912	3.8%	4
Luton North	Simon Hall	771	1.8%	5
Luton South	Ben Foley	995	2.4%	5
Macclesfield	James Booth	2,310	4.3%	4
Maidenhead	Emily Tomalin	2,216	3.9%	4
Maidstone and The Weald	Stuart Jeffery	2,172	4.2%	4
Makerfield	Sheila Shaw	1,166	2.6%	5
Maldon	Janet Band	1,851	3.7%	4
Manchester Central	Melanie Horrocks	1,870	3.6%	5
Manchester Gorton	Eliza Tyrrell	1,697	3.8%	4
Manchester Withington	Lucy Bannister	1,968	3.7%	4
Meon Valley	Malcolm Wallace	2,198	4.0%	4
Meriden	Stephen Caudwell	2,667	4.9%	4
Mid Bedfordshire	Gareth Ellis	2,478	3.8%	4
Mid Derbyshire	Sue MacFarlane	1,931	3.9%	4
Mid Sussex	Deanna Nicholson	2,234	3.6%	4
Mid Worcestershire	Sue Howarth	2,177	3.9%	4
Middlesbrough	Hugh Alberti	546	1.6%	4
Middlesbrough South and East Cleveland	Sophie Brown	1,220	2.6%	4
Milton Keynes North	Catherine Rose	1,931	3.1%	4
Milton Keynes South	Alan Francis	1,495	2.3%	4
Mitcham and Morden	Pippa Maslin	1,160	2.5%	5
Mole Valley	Lisa Scott-Conte	1,874	3.3%	4
Monmouth	Ian Chandler	1,353	2.7%	4
Morecambe and Lunesdale	Chloe Buckley	938	2.1%	4
Morley and Outwood	Chris Bell	1,107	2.1%	4
Neath	Megan Lloyd	728	2.0%	6
New Forest East	Nicola Jolly	2,434	4.8%	4
New Forest West	Nicholas Bubb	3,888	7.7%	4
Newark	Jay Henderson	1,950	3.6%	4
Newbury	Stephen Masters	2,454	4.1%	4
Newcastle-under-Lyme	Carl Johnson	933	2.1%	5
Newcastle upon Tyne Central	Taymar Pitman	1,365	3.6%	5
Newcastle upon Tyne East	Nick Hartley	2,195	5.1%	4
Newcastle upon Tyne North	Alistair Ford	1,368	2.9%	5
Newport East	Peter Varley	577	1.6%	6
Newport West	Amelia Womack	902	2.1%	6
Newton Abbot	Megan Debenham	1,508	2.9%	4
North Devon	Robbie Mack	1,759	3.2%	4
North Dorset	Kenneth Huggins	2,261	4.0%	4
North Durham	Derek Morse	1,126	2.7%	5
North East Bedfordshire	Philippa Fleming	1,891	2.9%	5
North East Cambridgeshire	Ruth Johnson	1,813	3.4%	4
North East Derbyshire	Frank Adlington-Stringer	1,278	2.6%	4
North East Hampshire	Culann Walsh	1,754	3.0%	4
North East Hertfordshire	Tim Lee	2,367	4.3%	4
North East Somerset	Fay Whitfield	1,423	2.5%	4
North Herefordshire	Ellie Chowns	4,769	9.3%	4
North Shropshire	John Adams	1,790	3.2%	4
North Somerset	Phil Neve	2,938	4.7%	4
North Swindon	Andy Bentley	1,710	3.1%	4
North Thanet	Robert Edwards	1,796	3.7%	4
North Tyneside	John Buttery	1,393	2.8%	4
North Warwickshire	James Platt	1,303	2.8%	4
North West Cambridgeshire	Nicola Day	3,021	4.7%	4
North West Durham	David Sewell	1,173	2.5%	6
North West Hampshire	Lance Mitchell	2,717	4.6%	4
North West Leicestershire	Carl Benfield	2,478	4.6%	4
North West Norfolk	Michael De Whalley	1,645	3.5%	4
North Wiltshire	Bonnie Jackson	1,939	3.5%	4
Northampton North	Katherine Pate	953	2.4%	4
Northampton South	Scott Mabbutt	1,222	3.0%	4
Norwich North	Adrian Holmes	1,078	2.3%	4
Norwich South	Catherine Rowett	2,469	4.8%	4
Nottingham East	Michelle Vacciana	1,183	3.0%	6
Nottingham North	Andrew Guy Jones	868	2.5%	5
Nottingham South	Cath Sutherland	1,583	3.3%	5
Nuneaton	Keith Kondakor	1,692	3.7%	4
Ogmore	Tom Muller	621	1.8%	6
Old Bexley and Sidcup	Matt Browne	1,477	3.2%	4
Oldham East and Saddleworth	Wendy Olsen	778	1.7%	6
Oldham West and Royton	Dan Jerrome	681	1.5%	5
Orpington	Karen Wheller	1,783	3.7%	4
Oxford East	David Williams	2,392	4.8%	4
Pendle	Clare Hales	678	1.5%	4
Penrith and The Border	Ali Ross	2,159	4.5%	4
Peterborough	Joseph Wells	728	1.5%	5
Plymouth Moor View	Ewan Melling Flavell	1,173	2.7%	4
Plymouth Sutton and Devonport	James Ellwood	1,557	2.9%	4
Poplar and Limehouse	Neil Jameson	2,159	3.5%	4
Portsmouth North	Lloyd Day	1,304	2.8%	4
Preston	Michael Welton	660	2.0%	5
Pudsey	Quinn Daley	894	1.6%	4
Putney	Fergal McEntee	1,133	2.2%	4
Rayleigh and Wickford	Paul Thorogood	2,002	3.6%	4
Reading East	David McElroy	1,549	2.8%	4
Reading West	Jamie Whitham	1,263	2.5%	4
Redcar	Rowan McLaughlin	491	1.2%	6
Redditch	Claire Davies	1,384	3.1%	4
Reigate	Jonathan Essex	3,169	6.0%	4
Rhondda	Shaun Thomas	438	1.5%	6
Ribble Valley	Paul Yates	1,704	3.1%	4
Richmond (Yorks)	John Yorke	2,500	4.3%	4
Rochdale	Sarah Croke	986	2.1%	5
Rochester and Stoord	Sonia Hyner	1,312	2.5%	4
Romford	David Hughes	1,428	3.0%	4
Rossendale and Darwen	Sarah Hall	1,193	2.4%	4
Rother Valley	Emily West	1,219	2.5%	4
Rugby	Rebecca Stevenson	1,544	3.0%	4
Ruislip, Northwood and Pinner	Sarah Green	1,646	3.1%	4
Runnymede and Weybridge	Benjamin Smith	1,876	3.5%	4
Rutland and Melton	Alastair McQuillan	2,875	4.9%	4
Saffron Walden	Coby Wing	2,947	4.7%	4
Salford and Eccles	Bryan Blears	2,060	4.1%	5
Salisbury	Rick Page	2,486	4.6%	4
Scunthorpe	Peter Dennington	670	1.8%	4
Sedgefield	John Furness	994	2.4%	5
Sefton Central	Alison Gibbon	1,261	2.5%	5
Selby and Ainsty	Arnold Warneken	1,823	3.2%	5
Sevenoaks	Paul Wharton	1,974	3.9%	4
Sheffield Brightside and Hillsborough	Christine Gilligan Kubo	1,179	3.0%	5
Sheffield Central	Alison Teal	4,570	9.0%	3
Sheffield Hallam	Natalie Thomas	1,630	2.9%	4
Sheffield Heeley	Paul Turpin	1,811	4.2%	5
Sherwood	Esther Cropper	1,214	2.3%	4
Shipley	Celia Hickson	1,301	2.4%	4
Shrewsbury and Atcham	Julian Dean	1,762	3.0%	4
Sittingbourne and Sheppey	Samantha Collins	1,188	2.3%	5
Skipton and Ripon	Andy Brown	2,748	4.7%	4
Sleaford and North Hykeham	Simon Tooke	1,742	2.6%	5
Slough	Julian Edmonds	1,047	2.1%	5
Solihull	Rosemary Sexton	2,022	3.7%	4
Somerton and Frome	Andrea Dexter	3,295	5.1%	4
South Derbyshire	Amanda Baker	1,788	3.3%	4
South Dorset	Jon Orrell	2,246	4.4%	4
South East Cornwall	Martha Green	1,493	2.8%	4
South Holland and The Deepings	Martin Blake	1,613	3.3%	4
South Norfolk	Ben Price	2,499	4.0%	4
South Northamptonshire	Denise Donaldson	2,634	3.9%	4
South Ribble	Andrew Fewings	1,207	2.2%	4
South Shields	Sarah McKeown	1,303	3.4%	6
South Staffordshire	Claire McIlvenna	1,935	3.9%	4
South Suffolk	Robert Lindsay	3,144	5.9%	4
South Thanet	Rebecca Wing	1,949	4.0%	4
South West Bedfordshire	Andrew Waters	2,031	3.8%	4
South West Devon	Ian Poyser	2,018	3.8%	4
Poplar and Limehouse	Neil Jameson	2,159	3.5%	4
South West Hertfordshire	Tom Pashby	1,466	2.4%	5
South West Norfolk	Pallavi Devulapalli	1,645	3.2%	4
South West Wiltshire	Julie Phillips	2,434	4.4%	4
Southampton Itchen	Osman Sen-Chadun	1,040	2.2%	4
Southampton Test	Katherine Barbour	1,433	3.2%	5
Spelthorne	Paul Jacobs	2,122	4.3%	4
St Albans	Simon Grover	1,004	1.7%	4
St Austell and Newquay	Collin Harker	1,609	2.9%	5
St Helens North	David Van Der Burg	1,966	4.1%	5
St Helens South and Whiston	Kai Taylor	2,282	4.5%	5
St Ives	Ian Flindall	964	1.9%	4
Stafford	Emma Carter	2,367	4.6%	4
Staffordshire Moorlands	Douglas Rouxel	1,231	2.8%	4
Stalybridge and Hyde	Julie Wood	1,411	3.3%	5
Stevenage	Victoria Snelling	1,457	3.1%	4
Stockport	Helena Mellish	1,403	3.4%	5
Stoke-on-Trent Central	Adam Colclough	819	2.6%	5
Stoke-on-Trent North	Alan Borgars	508	1.3%	5
Stone	Tom Adamson	2,002	4.0%	4
Stourbridge	Andi Mohr	1,048	2.3%	4
Stratford-on-Avon	David Passingham	2,112	3.8%	4
Streatham	Scott Ainslie	2,567	4.5%	4
Stretford and Urmston	Jane Leicester	1,357	2.7%	5
Stroud	Molly Scott Cato	4,954	7.5%	3
Suffolk Coastal	Rachel Smith-Lyte	2,713	4.7%	4
Sunderland Central	Rachel Featherstone	1,212	2.8%	5
Surrey Heath	Sharon Galliford	2,252	3.8%	4
Sutton and Cheam	Claire Jackson-Prior	1,168	2.3%	4
Sutton Coldfield	Ben Auton	2,031	3.9%	4
Swansea East	Chris Evans	583	1.7%	6
Tamworth	Andrew Tilley	935	2.0%	4
Tatton	Nigel Hennerley	2,088	4.3%	4
Tewkesbury	Cate Cody	2,784	4.6%	4
The Cotswolds	Neil Jameson	3,312	5.4%	4
The Wrekin	Tim Dawes	1,491	3.0%	4
Thirsk and Malton	Martin Brampton	2,263	4.0%	4
Thurrock	Benjamin Harvey	807	1.7%	5
Tiverton and Honiton	Colin Reed	2,291	3.8%	4
Tonbridge and Malling	April Clark	4,090	7.2%	4
Tooting	Glyn Goodwin	2,314	4.0%	4
Torbay	Sam Moss	1,235	2.5%	4
Torfaen	Andrew Heygate-Browne	812	2.2%	6
Torridge and West Devon	Chris Jordan	2,077	3.5%	4
Tottenham	Emma Chan	1,873	4.0%	4
Truro and Falmouth	Tom Scott	1,714	2.9%	4
Tynemouth	Julia Erskine	1,281	2.3%	5
Uxbridge and South Ruislip	Mark Keir	1,090	2.3%	4
Vale of Glamorgan	Anthony Slaughter	3,251	5.9%	3
Vauxhall	Jacqueline Bond	2,516	4.5%	4
Wallasey	Lily Clough	1,132	2.4%	5
Walsall North	Mark Wilson	617	1.7%	4
Walsall South	John Macefield	634	1.5%	5
Walthamstow	Andrew Johns	1,733	3.6%	4
Wansbeck	Steven Leyland	1,217	3.0%	5
Warley	Kathryn Downs	891	2.4%	5
Warrington North	Lyndsay McAteer	1,257	2.7%	5
Warwick and Leamington	Jonathan Chilvers	1,536	2.8%	4
Washington and Sunderland West	Michal Chantkowski	1,005	2.7%	5
Waveney	Elfrede Brambley-Crawshaw	2,727	5.3%	4
Weaver Vale	Paul Bowers	1,051	2.1%	5
Wellingborough	Marion Turner-Hawes	1,821	3.5%	4
Welwyn Hatfield	Oliver Sayers	1,618	3.1%	4
West Bromwich East	Mark Redding	627	1.7%	5
West Bromwich West	Keir Williams	664	1.9%	5
West Dorset	Kelvin Clayton	2,124	3.5%	4
West Lancashire	John Puddifer	1,248	2.4%	5
West Suffolk	Donald Allwright	2,262	4.4%	4
West Worcestershire	Martin Allen	2,715	4.7%	4
Westminster North	Holly Robinson	1,064	2.5%	4
Weston-Super-Mare	Suneil Basu	1,834	3.3%	4
Wigan	Peter Jacobs	1,299	2.9%	4
Windsor	Fintan McKeown	1,796	3.3%	4
Wirral South	Harry Ross Gorman	948	2.2%	5
Wirral West	John Coyne	965	2.2%	4
Witham	James Abbott	3,090	6.3%	4
Woking	Ella Walding	1,485	2.8%	4
Wokingham	Kizzi Johannessen	1,382	2.2%	4
Wolverhampton North East	Andrea Cantrill	603	1.8%	4
Wolverhampton South East	Kathryn Gilbert	521	1.6%	5
Worcester	Louis Stephen	1,694	3.2%	4
Workington	Jill Perry	596	1.4%	6
Worsley and Eccles South	Daniel Towers	1,300	2.9%	5
Worthing West	Joanne Paul	2,008	3.7%	4
Wrexham	Duncan Rees	445	1.3%	6
Wycombe	Peter Sims	1,454	2.7%	4
Wyre and Preston North	Ruth Norbury	1,729	3.3%	4
Wyre Forest	John Davis	1,973	3.9%	4
Wythenshawe and Sale East	Robert Nunney	1,559	3.5%	5
Yeovil	Diane Wood	1,629	2.7%	4
York Central	Tom Franklin	2,107	4.3%	4

=== General election 2024 ===
The 2024 general election was the party's most successful ever. Green candidates stood in all but one of the 575 seats across England and Wales. Four Green MPs were elected, with the party retaining the seat of Brighton Pavilion and gaining Bristol Central, North Herefordshire and Waveney Valley. In addition, 40 further seats saw Greens finish in second. In total, 359 seats saw votes in excess of 5% and therefore a returned deposit.

Constituency	Candidate	Votes	%	Place
Aberafan Maesteg	Nigel Hill	1,094	3.1%	5
Aldershot	Ed Neville	2,155	4.4%	5
Aldridge-Brownhills	Clare Nash	1,746	4.3%	5
Altrincham and Sale West	Geraldine Coggins	3,699	7.2%	5
Amber Valley	Matt McGuinness	2,278	5.4%	4
Arundel and South Downs	Steve McAuliff	5,515	10.1%	5
Ashfield	Alexander Coates	1,100	2.8%	5
Ashford	Mandy Rossi	4,355	9.3%	4
Ashton-under-Lyne	Lee Huntbach	2,481	7.0%	5
Aylesbury	Julie Atkins	2,590	5.2%	5
Banbury	Arron Baker	2,615	5.4%	5
Barking	Simon Anthony	4,988	13.7%	3
Barnsley North	Tom Heyes	1,805	4.9%	4
Barnsley South	Trevor Mayne	1,521	4.3%	4
Barrow and Furness	Lorraine Wrennall	1,466	3.5%	5
Basildon and Billericay	Stewart Goshawk	2,123	7.2%	4
Basingstoke	Michael Howard-Sorrell	3,568	7.3%	4
Bassetlaw	Rachel Reeves	1,947	4.3%	5
Battersea	Joe Taylor	4,239	9.0%	4
Beaconsfield	Dominick Pegram	1,977	4.1%	5
Beckenham and Penge	Ruth Fabricant	3,830	7.3%	5
Bedford	Ben Foley	2,394	5.9%	5
Bermondsey and Old Southwark	Susan Hunter	4,477	11.9%	3
Bethnal Green and Stepney	Phoebe Gill	6,391	13.7%	3
Beverley and Holderness	Jonathan Stephenson	1,647	3.7%	5
Bexleyheath and Crayford	George Edgar	2,076	4.8%	5
Birkenhead	Jo Bird	8,670	20.1%	2
Birmingham Edgbaston	Nicola Payne	2,797	7.5%	5
Birmingham Erdington	Karen Trench	2,452	7.3%	4
Birmingham Hall Green and Moseley	Zain Ahmed	3,913	9.4%	5
Birmingham Hodge Hill and Solihull North	Imran Khan	2,360	6.9%	5
Birmingham Ladywood	Zoe Challenor	3,478	9.5%	3
Birmingham Northfield	Rob Grant	2,809	7.5%	4
Birmingham Perry Barr	Kefentse Dennis	2,440	6.5%	5
Birmingham Selly Oak	Jane Baston	4,320	11.2%	4
Birmingham Yardley	Roxanne Green	1,958	5.4%	6
Blackburn	Denise Morgan	1,416	3.6%	5
Blackley and Middleton South	Dylan Lewis-Creser	3,197	10.2%	3
Blackpool North and Fleetwood	Tina Rothery	1,269	3.0%	5
Blackpool South	Ben Thomas	1,207	3.4%	4
Blaenau Gwent and Rhymney	Anne Baker	1,719	5.7%	5
Blaydon and Consett	Richard Simpson	2,589	6.1%	4
Braintree	Paul Thorogood	2,878	5.9%	5
Bognor Regis and Littlehampton	Carol Birch	2,185	4.6%	5
Bolsover	David Kesteven	3,754	8.8%	4
Bolton North East	Hanif Alli	4,683	10.8%	4
Bolton South and Walkden	Philip Kochitty	2,827	7.7%	5
Bolton West	Paris Hayes	4,132	9.3%	4
Bootle	Neil Doolin	3,904	10.0%	3
Boston and Skegness	Christopher Moore	1,506	3.7%	4
Bournemouth East	Joe Salmon	2,790	6.2%	5
Bournemouth West	Darren Jones	2,614	6.6%	5
Bracknell	Emily Torode	2,166	4.9%	5
Bradford East	Celia Hickson	2,571	6.9%	5
Bradford South	Matt Edwards	3,366	10.2%	4
Bradford West	Khalid Mahmood	3,690	10.0%	3
Brent East	Nida Al-Fulaij	3,729	9.9%	3
Brent West	Bastôn De'Medici-Jaguar	2,805	6.8%	4
Brentford and Isleworth	Freya Summersgill	4,029	8.9%	3
Brentwood and Ongar	Reece Learmouth	1,770	3.7%	5
Bridgend	Debra Ann Cooper	1,760	4.3%	6
Bridgwater	Charlie Graham	1,720	4.3%	5
Brigg and Immingham	Amie Watson	1,905	4.5%	4
Brighton Kemptown and Peacehaven	Elaine Hills	7,997	19.7%	3
Brighton Pavilion	Siân Berry	28,809	55.0%	1
Bristol Central	Carla Denyer	24,539	56.6%	1
Bristol East	Ani Stafford-Townsend	14,142	30.7%	2
Bristol North East	Lorraine Francis	7,837	18.7%	2
Bristol North West	Mary Page	8,389	17.3%	2
Bristol South	Jai Breitnauer	10,855	25.0%	2
Broadland and Fakenham	Jan Davis	3,203	6.5%	4
Bromley and Biggin Hill	Caroline Sandes	2,583	5.5%	5
Bromsgrove	Talia Ellis	1,675	3.3%	5
Broxbourne	Owen Brett	2,461	5.7%	5
Broxtowe	Teresa Needham	3,488	7.3%	5
Burnley	Jack Launer	1,518	3.8%	5
Burton and Uttoxeter	Anna Westwood	2,119	4.6%	4
Bury North	Owain Sutton	1,747	3.8%	5
Bury South	Michael Welton	2,715	6.4%	4
Bury St Edmunds and Stowmarket	Helen Geake	5,761	11.3%	4
Camborne and Redruth	Catherine Hayes	2,840	5.9%	5
Cambridge	Sarah Nicmanis	6,842	16.3%	3
Cannock Chase	Andrea Muckley	2,137	5.0%	4
Cardiff North	Meg Shepherd-Foster	3,160	6.7%	6
Cardiff South and Penarth	Anthony Slaughter	5,661	14.5%	2
Cardiff West	Jess Ryan	3,157	7.1%	5
Carshalton and Wallington	Tracey Hague	1,517	3.3%	5
Castle Point	Bob Chapman	2,118	5.2%	4
Central Devon	Gill Westcott	3,338	6.2%	5
Central Suffolk and North Ipswich	Daniel Pratt	5,652	12.2%	4
Ceredigion Preseli	Tomos Barlow	1,864	4.0%	6
Chatham and Aylesford	Kim Winterbottom	2,504	6.1%	4
Chelmsford	Reza Hossain	1,588	3.1%	5
Chelsea and Fulham	Mona Crocker	2,798	5.9%	5
Chesham and Amersham	Justine Fulford	1,673	3.1%	5
Chesterfield	David Wadsworth	2,682	6.5%	4
Chichester	Tim Young	1,815	3.5%	5
Chingford and Woodford Green	Chris Brody	1,334	2.7%	5
Chipping Barnet	David Farbey	3,442	6.8%	4
Chorley	Mark Tebbutt	4,663	13.7%	2
Christchurch	Susan Graham	1,900	4.0%	5
Cities of London and Westminster	Rajiv Sinha	2,844	7.3%	4
City of Durham	Jonathan Elmer	2,803	6.9%	5
Clacton	Natasha Osben	1,935	4.2%	5
Clapham and Brixton Hill	Shâo-Lan Yuen	5,768	13.5%	3
Colchester	Sara Ruth	2,414	5.4%	5
Colne Valley	Heather Peacock	3,480	7.5%	4
Congleton	Richard McCarthy	2,007	4.0%	6
Corby and East Northamptonshire	Lee Forster	2,507	5.1%	4
Coventry East	Esther Reeves	2,730	7.4%	4
Coventry North West	Esther Reeves	3,420	8.1%	4
Coventry South	Anne Patterson	2,363	5.5%	5
Crawley	Iain Dickson	2,621	5.7%	4
Crewe and Natwich	Te Ata Browne	2,151	4.6%	5
Croydon East	Peter Underwood	4,097	9.4%	4
Croydon South	Elaine Garrod	2,859	5.8%	5
Croydon West	Ria Patel	3,851	10.1%	3
Dagenham and Rainham	Kim Arrowsmith	4,184	10.8%	4
Darlington	Matthew Snedker	2,847	6.7%	4
Dartford	Laura Edie	3,189	7.2%	4
Daventry	Clare Slater	2,959	5.6%	5
Derby North	Helen Hitchcock	3,286	8.0%	4
Derby South	Sam Ward	1,889	5.1%	5
Derbyshire Dales	Kelda Boothroyd	2,830	5.5%	5
Dewsbury and Batley	Simon Cope	2,048	5.4%	5
Doncaster Central	Jennifer Rozenfelds	1,880	5.0%	4
Dover and Deal	Christine Oliver	3,106	6.5%	4
Dudley	Zia Qari	1,154	3.2%	4
Dunstable and Leighton Buzzard	Sukhinder Hundal	2,115	4.6%	5
Dulwich and West Norwood	Pete Elliott	8,567	18.9%	2
Ealing Central and Acton	Kate Crossland	5,444	11.4%	4
Ealing North	Natalia Kubica	4,056	9.4%	3
Ealing Southall	Neil Reynolds	4,356	9.3%	3
East Ham	Rosie Pearce	4,226	11.2%	3
East Hampshire	Richard Knight	2,404	4.8%	5
East Surrey	Shasha Khan	2,957	6.0%	5
East Worthing and Shoreham	Debbie Woudman	3,246	6.6%	4
Eastleigh	Ben Parry	2,403	5.2%	5
Edmonton and Winchmore Hill	Luke Balnave	3,681	9.0%	3
Ellesmere Port and Bromborough	Harry Gorman	2,706	6.4%	4
Eltham and Chislehurst	Sam Gabriel	3,079	6.8%	4
Ely and East Cambridgeshire	Andy Cogan	2,359	4.5%	5
Enfield North	Isobel Whittaker	3,713	8.5%	4
Epping Forest	Simon Heap	2,486	6.0%	5
Epsom and Ewell	Stephen McKenna	1,745	3.2%	5
Erewash	Brent Poland	2,478	5.7%	4
Erith and Thamesmead	Sarah Barry	3,482	8.6%	4
Exeter	Andrew Bell	5,907	14.7%	3
Fareham and Waterlooville	Baz Marie	2,036	4.1%	5
Faversham and Mid Kent	Hannah Temple	4,218	9.1%	4
Feltham and Heston	Katharine Kandelaki	2,543	6.5%	4
Filton and Bradley Stoke	James Nelson	4,142	8.2%	4
Finchley and Golders Green	Steve Parsons	3,107	6.3%	4
Folkestone and Hythe	Marianne Brett	3,954	9.1%	4
Forest of Dean	Chris McFarling	4,735	9.8%	4
Fylde	Brenden Wilkinson	1,560	3.3%	6
Gainsborough	Vanessa Smith	1,832	3.9%	5
Gateshead Central and Whickham	Rachael Cabral	3,217	8.0%	5
Gedling	Dominic Berry	3,122	6.4%	4
Gillingham and Rainham	Kate Belmonte	2,318	5.6%	4
Gloucester	Adam Shearing	2,307	5.0%	5
Gosport	Tony Sudworth	1,948	4.4%	5
Grantham and Bourne	Anne Gayfer	2,570	5.6%	4
Gravesham	Rebecca Hopkins	2,254	5.2%	4
Great Grimsby and Cleethorpes	Ed Fraser	1,115	3.0%	4
Great Yarmouth	Trevor Rawson	1,736	4.3%	4
Greenwich and Woolwich	Stacy Smith	5,633	13.2%	2
Hackney North and Stoke Newington	Antoinette Fernandez	9,275	22.6%	2
Hackney South and Shoreditch	Laura-Louise Fairley	9,987	23.9%	2
Halesowen and Rowley Regis	Emma Bullard	2,151	5.6%	5
Hammersmith and Chiswick	Naranee Ruthra-Rajan	4,468	9.7%	3
Hampstead and Highgate	Lorna Russell	6,630	13.7%	3
Harborough, Oadby and Wigston	Darren Woodiwiss	4,269	8.5%	5
Harlow	Yasmin Gregory	2,267	5.2%	4
Harpenden and Berkhamsted	Paul de Hoest	1,951	3.6%	5
Harrow East	Seb Newsam	2,006	4.2%	5
Harrow West	Rupert George	2,438	5.4%	5
Harwich and North Essex	Andrew Canessa	2,794	5.8%	5
Havant	Jeanette Shepherd	2,861	6.8%	5
Hayes and Harlington	Christine West	2,131	5.6%	4
Hemel Hempstead	Sherief Hassan	2,492	5.6%	5
Hendon	Gabrielle Bailey	2,667	6.5%	4
Henley and Thame	Jo Robb	2,008	3.8%	5
Hereford and South Herefordshire	Diana Lagoutte	3,175	7.0%	5
Hertford and Stortford	Nick Cox	4,373	8.1%	4
Hertsmere	John Humphries	2,267	4.7%	6
Hexham	Nick Morphet	2,467	4.8%	3
High Peak	Joanna Collins	3,382	6.9%	4
Hinckley and Bosworth	Cassie Wells	1,514	3.2%	5
Hitchin	Will Lavin	2,631	5.1%	5
Holborn and St Pancras	David Stansell	4,030	10.4%	3
Hornchurch and Upminster	Melanie Collins	2,620	5.6%	4
Hornsey and Friern Barnet	Jarelle Francis	7,060	14.5%	2
Horsham	Catherine Ross	2,137	3.9%	5
Houghton and Sunderland South	Richard Bradley	1,723	4.3%	5
Hove and Portslade	Sophie Broadbent	7,418	14.3%	2
Huddersfield	Andrew Cooper	10,568	26.3%	2
Huntingdon	Georgie Hunt	3,042	5.8%	5
Hyndburn	Shabir Fazal	4,938	13.6%	4
Ilford North	Rachel Collinson	1,794	3.8%	5
Ilford South	Syed Siddiqi	3,437	8.3%	4
Ipswich	Adria Pittock	3,652	8.3%	4
Isle of Wight East	Vix Lowthion	6,313	18.5%	3
Isle of Wight West	Cameron Palin	2,310	6.7%	5
Islington North	Sheridan Kates	2,660	5.4%	3
Islington South and Finsbury	Carne Ross	7,491	17.5%	2
Jarrow and Gateshead East	Nic Cook	2,384	6.5%	4
Kenilworth and Southam	Alix Dearing	3,125	5.9%	5
Kensington and Bayswater	Mona Adam	2,732	6.5%	4
Kettering	Emily Fedorowycz	7,004	13.9%	4
Kingston and Surbiton	Debojyoti Das	3,009	5.9%	5
Kingston upon Hull East	Julia Brown	1,675	5.6%	5
Kingston upon Hull North and Cottingham	Kerry Elizabeth Harrison	2,322	6.1%	5
Kingston upon Hull West and Haltemprice	Kevin Paulson	1,748	4.6%	5
Knowsley	Graham Wickens	2,772	7.7%	3
Lancaster and Wyre	Jack Lenox	5,236	12.2%	4
Leeds Central and Headingley	Chris Foren	7,431	23.5%	2
Leeds East	Jennifer Norman	3,506	8.9%	4
Leeds North East	Louise Jennings	5,911	13.1%	3
Leeds North West	Mick Bradley	3,231	6.5%	5
Leeds South	Ed Carlisle	5,838	18.4%	2
Leeds South West and Morley	Chris Bell	2,522	6.3%	4
Leeds West and Pudsey	Ann Forsaith	3,794	9.9%	4
Leicester East	Mags Lewis	2,143	4.6%	7
Leicester South	Sharmen Rahman	3,826	9.1%	4
Leicester West	Aasiya Bora	4,089	11.6%	4
Lewes	Paul Keene	1,869	3.5%	5
Lewisham East	Mike Herron	5,573	13.7%	2
Lewisham North	Adam Pugh	9,685	21.9%	2
Lewisham West and East Dulwich	Callum Fowler	9,009	19.4%	2
Leyton and Wanstead	Charlotte Lafferty	6,791	15.5%	2
Lichfield	Heather McNeillis	1,724	3.5%	5
Lincoln	Sally Horscroft	2,751	6.5%	4
Liverpool Garston	Muryam Sheikh	2,816	6.7%	6
Liverpool Riverside	Chris Coughlan	5,246	16.2%	2
Liverpool Walton	Martyn Madeley	2,388	6.5%	3
Liverpool Wavertree	Tom Crone	6,773	17.0%	2
Liverpool West Derby	Maria Coughlan	2,647	7.0%	3
Loughborough	Hans Zollinger-Ball	2,956	7.0%	4
Louth and Horncastle	Robert Watson	2,504	5.4%	4
Lowestoft	Toby Hammond	3,095	7.4%	4
Luton North	Ejel Khan	1,940	5.0%	6
Luton South and South Bedfordshire	Edward Carpenter	2,401	6.3%	6
Macclesfield	Amanda Iremonger	2,493	4.7%	4
Maidenhead	Andrew Cooney	1,996	4.0%	4
Maidstone and Malling	Stuart Jeffery	3,727	8.0%	5
Makerfield	Maria Deery	1,776	4.4%	5
Maldon	Isobel Doubleday	2,300	4.6%	5
Manchester Central	Ekua Bayunu	6,387	16.1%	2
Manchester Rusholme	Thirza Asanga-Rae	6,819	23.5%	2
Manchester Withington	Sam Easterby-Smith	8,084	19.4%	2
Mansfield	Alastair McQuillan	3,685	8.0%	4
Melton and Syston	Shesh Sheshabhatter	2,929	6.7%	5
Meriden and Solihull East	Shesh Sheshabhatter	2,929	6.7%	5
Mid Bedfordshire	Cade Sibley	2,584	5.2%	5
Mid Derbyshire	Gez Kinsella	3,547	7.5%	4
Mid Leicestershire	Tony Deakin	3,414	7.1%	4
Mid Norfolk	Ash Haynes	2,858	6.2%	5
Mid Sussex	Deanna Nicholson	2,048	3.8%	5
Middlesbrough and Thornaby East	Matthew Harris	1,522	4.4%	5
Middlesbrough South and East Cleveland	Rowan McLaughlin	1,446	3.8%	4
Milton Keynes Central	Frances Bonney	3,226	6.8%	5
Milton Keynes North	Alan Francis	3,242	7.1%	5
Mitcham and Morden	Pippa Maslin	4,635	10.2%	3
Monmouthshire	Ian Chandler	2,357	4.6%	4
Morecambe and Lunesdale	Gina Dowding	2,089	4.3%	5
Neath and Swansea East	Megan Lloyd	1,711	4.3%	6
New Forest East	Simon King	3,118	6.9%	5
New Forest West	Anna Collar	2,800	6.0%	5
Newark	Michael Ackroyd	2,345	4.4%	5
Newbury	Stephen Masters	2,714	5.5%	5
Newcastle-under-Lyme	Jennifer Hibell	1,851	4.7%	5
Newcastle upon Tyne Central and West	John Pearson	3,228	7.8%	5
Newcastle upon Tyne East and Wallsend	Matthew Williams	5,257	12.4%	4
Newcastle upon Tyne North	Sarah Peters	5,035	10.4%	5
Newport East	Lauren James	2,092	5.4%	6
Newport West and Islwyn	Kerry Vosper	2,078	5.0%	6
Newton Abbot	Pauline Wynter	2,083	4.3%	5
North Bedfordshire	Philippa Fleming	3,027	5.9%	5
North Devon	Cassius Lay	2,348	4.6%	5
North Dorset	Ken Huggins	2,082	4.2%	5
North Durham	Sunny Moon-Schott	2,366	5.7%	5
North Norfolk	Liz Dixon	1,406	3.0%	5
North East Cambridgeshire	Andrew Crawford	2,001	5.1%	5
North East Derbyshire	Frank Adlington-Stringer	2,271	5.0%	4
North East Hampshire	Mohamed Miah	1,425	2.5%	5
North East Hertfordshire	Vicky Burt	3,802	7.2%	5
North East Somerset and Hanham	Edmund Cannon	3,222	6.3%	5
North Herefordshire	Ellie Chowns	21,736	43.2%	1
North Shropshire	Craig Emery	1,234	2.5%	5
North Somerset	Oscar Livesey-Lodwick	3,273	6.1%	5
North Warwickshire and Bedworth	Alison Wilson	1,755	4.3%	4
North West Cambridgeshire	Elliot Tong	2,960	6.7%	5
North West Essex	Edward Gildea	2,846	5.2%	5
North West Hampshire	Hina West	2,745	5.4%	5
North West Leicestershire	Carl Benfield	2,831	5.8%	4
North West Norfolk	Michael De Whalley	2,137	4.8%	5
Northampton North	Eishar Bassan	2,558	6.1%	4
Northampton South	Simon Sneddon	2,398	5.5%	5
Norwich North	Ben Price	4,372	9.6%	4
Norwich South	Jamie Osborn	8,245	18.3%	2
Nottingham East	Rosey Palmer	4,332	11.9%	2
Nottingham North and Kimberley	Samuel Harvey	3,351	9.6%	4
Nottingham South	Cath Sutherland	2,923	8.9%	4
Nuneaton	Keith Kondakor	2,894	7.0%	4
Old Bexley and Sidcup	Brad Davies	2,601	5.5%	4
Oldham East and Saddleworth	Fesl Reza-Khan	1,490	3.7%	6
Oldham West, Chadderton and Royton	Samsuzzaman Syed	1,857	4.8%	7
Orpington	Seamus McCauley	2,319	5.0%	5
Oxford East	Sushila Dhall	5,076	12.9%	2
Oxford West and Abingdon	Chris Goodall	3,236	7.0%	5
Peckham	Claire Sheppard	7,585	19.6%	2
Pendle and Clitheroe	Lex Kristan	1,421	3.0%	6
Penrith and Solway	Susan Denham-Smith	1,730	3.5%	5
Peterborough	Nicola Day	2,542	6.1%	5
Plymouth Moor View	Georgia Nelson	1,694	4.0%	5
Plymouth Sutton and Devonport	Cam Hayward	3,186	7.6%	4
Poplar and Limehouse	Nathalie Bienfait	5,975	13.9%	2
Portsmouth North	Duncan Robinson	1,851	4.5%	5
Portsmouth South	Elliott Lee	3,107	8.0%	5
Preston	Isabella Metcalf-Riener	1,751	4.4%	6
Putney	Fergal McEntee	3,182	7.4%	4
Queen's Park and Maida Vale	Vivien Lichtenstein	5,213	13.6%	2
Rayleigh and Wickford	Christopher Taylor	2,196	4.6%	5
Reading Central	David McElroy	6,417	14.2%	3
Reading West and Mid Berkshire	Carolyne Culver	3,169	6.8%	5
Redcar	Ruth Hatton	1,270	3.3%	5
Redditch	David Thain	2,098	5.0%	5
Reigate	Jonathan Essex	4,691	8.8%	5
Rhondda and Ogmore	Christine Glossop	1,177	3.3%	5
Ribble Valley	Caroline Montague	1,727	3.3%	5
Richmond and Northallerton	Kevin Foster	2,058	4.2%	5
Richmond Park	Chas Warlow	2,728	5.3%	5
Rochdale	Martyn Savin	1,212	3.1%	6
Rochester and Strood	Cat Jamieson	2,427	5.7%	4
Romford	David Hughes	2,220	5.0%	4
Romsey and Southampton North	Connor Shaw	1,893	3.8%	5
Rossendale and Darwen	Bob Bauld	2,325	5.2%	4
Rother Valley	Paul Martin	1,706	4.1%	4
Rugby	Becca Stevenson	2,556	5.2%	5
Ruislip, Northwood and Pinner	Jess Lee	2,926	6.2%	5
Runnymede and Weybridge	Steve Ringham	1,954	4.0%	5
Rushcliffe	Richard Mallender	4,367	7.6%	4
Rutland and Stamford	Emma Louise Baker	2,806	5.8%	5
Salford	Wendy Olsen	5,188	13.1%	3
Salisbury	Barney Norris	2,115	4.2%	5
Scunthorpe	Nick Cox	1,218	3.1%	4
Sefton Central	Kieran Dams	3,294	6.9%	4
Selby	Angela Oldershaw	2,484	5.0%	4
Sevenoaks	Laura Manston	2,033	4.1%	5
Sheffield Brightside and Hillsborough	Christine Kubo	4,701	14.9%	2
Sheffield Central	Angela Argenzio	8,283	26.0%	2
Sheffield Hallam	Jason Leman	4,491	8.7%	4
Sheffield Heeley	Alexi Dimond	5,926	15.4%	2
Sherwood Forest	Sheila Greatrex-White	2,216	4.6%	4
Shipley	Kevin Warnes	3,605	7.5%	4
Shrewsbury	Julian Dean	2,387	4.6%	5
Sittingbourne and Sheppey	Sam Banks	1,692	4.1%	5
Skipton and Ripon	Andy Brown	3,446	6.4%	5
Sleaford and North Hykeham	Martin Blake	2,435	5.0%	5
Slough	Julian Edmonds	1,873	4.3%	6
Solihull West and Shirley	Max McLoughlin	3,270	7.0%	5
Southend East and Rochford	Simon Cross	2,716	6.8%	4
Southend West and Leigh	Tilly Hogrebe	3,262	6.9%	4
Southgate and Wood Green	Charith Gunawardena	5,607	12.3%	3
South Basildon and East Thurrock	Elizabeth Grant	1,718	4.3%	5
South Cambridgeshire	Miranda Fyfe	2,656	4.8%	5
South Derbyshire	Aruhan Galieva	1,941	4.2%	5
South Dorset	Catherine Bennett	2,153	4.4%	5
South East Cornwall	Martin Corney	1,999	4.1%	5
South Holland and The Deepings	Rhys Baker	1,800	3.9%	6
South Norfolk	Catherine Rowett	3,987	8.0%	5
South Leicestershire	Mike Jelfs	2,481	4.8%	5
South Northamptonshire	Emmie Williamson	3,040	5.7%	5
South Ribble	Stephani Mok	1,574	3.4%	5
South Shields	David Francis	5,433	14.8%	3
South Suffolk	Jessie Carter	4,008	8.2%	5
South West Devon	Lauren McLay	2,925	5.6%	5
South West Hertfordshire	Narinder Sian	2,532	5.2%	5
South West Norfolk	Pallavi Devulapalli	1,838	4.1%	6
South West Wiltshire	Fay Whitfield	2,243	4.9%	5
Southampton Itchen	Neil McKinnon Lyon Kelly	2,793	7.3%	4
Southampton Test	Katherine Barbour	3,594	10.0%	4
Spelthorne	Manu Singh	2,413	5.2%	5
St Albans	Simon Grover	3,272	6.3%	5
St Austell and Newquay	Amanda Pennington	2,337	5.0%	5
St Helens North	Daniel Thomas	3,495	8.6%	4
St Helens South and Whiston	Terence Price	2,642	7.0%	5
St Ives	Ian Flindall	1,797	3.7%	5
St Neots and Mid Cambridgeshire	Kathryn Fisher	2,663	3.3%	6
Stafford	Scott Spencer	2,856	6.2%	4
Staffordshire Moorlands	Helen Stead	2,293	5.3%	4
Stalybridge and Hyde	Robert Hodgetts-Haley	2,745	7.4%	4
Stevenage	Paul Dawson	2,655	6.2%	5
Stockport	Helena Mellish	4,865	11.1%	4
Stoke-on-Trent Central	Adam Colclough	1,703	4.8%	5
Stoke-on-Trent North	Josh Harris	1,236	3.4%	4
Stoke-on-Trent South	Peggy Wiseman	1,207	2.9%	6
Stone, Great Wyrley and Penkridge	Danni Braine	2,236	5.2%	5
Stourbridge	Stephen Price	1,732	4.3%	4
Stratford and Bow	Joe Hudson-Small	7,511	17.3%	2
Stratford-on-Avon	Doug Rouxel	1,197	2.2%	5
Streatham and Croydon North	Scott Ainslie	7,629	17.1%	2
Stretford and Urmston	Dan Jerrome	4,398	9.6%	5
Suffolk Coastal	Julian Cusack	4,380	8.9%	5
Sunderland Central	Rachel Featherstone	2,993	7.5%	5
Surrey Heath	Jon Campbell	1,162	2.4%	5
Sutton and Cheam	Aasha Anam	1,721	3.6%	5
Sutton Coldfield	Ben Auton	2,419	5.0%	5
Swansea West	Peter Jones	2,305	6.5%	6
Tamworth	Sue Howarth	1,579	3.6%	4
Tatton	Nigel Hennerley	2,571	5.0%	5
Tewkesbury	Cate Cody	2,873	5.9%	5
The Wrekin	Patrick McCarthy	3,028	6.1%	5
Thirsk and Malton	Richard McLane	2,986	6.0%	5
Thurrock	Eugene McCarthy	1,632	4.4%	4
Tiverton and Minehead	Laura Buchanan	2,234	4.7%	5
Tonbridge	Anna Cope	7,596	15.1%	3
Tooting	Nick Humberstone	5,672	10.7%	3
Torbay	Charlie West	1,420	3.1%	5
Torfaen	Philip Davies	1,705	4.8%	5
Torridge and Tavistock	Judy Maciejowska	2,350	4.6%	5
Tottenham	David Craig	7,632	19.0%	2
Truro and Falmouth	Karen La Borde	3,470	6.9%	5
Twickenham	Chantal Kerr-Sheppard	3,590	6.7%	5
Uxbridge and South Ruislip	Sarah Green	4,354	9.5%	4
Vale of Glamorgan	Lynden Mack	1,881	4.1%	5
Vauxhall and Camberwell Green	Catherine Dawkins	6,416	17.1%	2
Walsall and Bloxwich	Sadat Hussain	2,288	6.2%	5
Walthamstow	Rosalinda Rowlands	9,176	20.0%	2
Warrington North	Hannah Spencer	1,889	4.7%	5
Warrington South	Stephanie Davies	2,313	4.7%	5
Warwick and Leamington	Hema YellaPragada	4,471	9.1%	4
Washington and Gateshead South	Michal Chantkowski	1,687	4.6%	4
Watford	Arran Bowen-la Grange	2,428	5.5%	6
Waveney Valley	Adrian Ramsay	20,467	41.7%	1
Wellingborough and Rushden	Paul Mannion	2,704	6.2%	4
Welwyn Hatfield	Sarah Butcher	2,986	6.2%	5
West Bromwich	Gita Joshi	2,036	5.6%	4
West Ham and Beckton	Rob Callender	3,897	10.7%	3
West Lancashire	John Puddifer	1,248	2.4%	5
West Suffolk	Mark Ereira-Guyer	2,910	6.3%	5
West Worcestershire	Natalie McVey	5,068	9.3%	5
Westminster North	Holly Robinson	1,064	2.5%	4
Weston-Super-Mare	Thomas Daw	2,688	6.3%	5
Wigan	Jane Leicester	1,629	4.0%	6
Windsor	Michael Boyle	2,288	5.1%	5
Wimbledon	Rachel Brooks	2,442	4.4%	5
Wirral West	Gail Jenkinson	4,160	8.3%	4
Witham	James Abbott	3,539	7.0%	4
Woking	Nataly Anderson	1,853	3.8%	5
Wokingham	Merv Boniface	1,953	3.6%	5
Wolverhampton North East	Kwaku Tano-Yeboah	1,424	4.3%	4
Wolverhampton South East	Paul Darke	1,643	4.9%	4
Wolverhampton West	Andrea Cantrill	2,550	5.8%	4
Worcester	Tor Pingree	4,789	10.4%	4
Worsley and Eccles South	David Jones	3,283	7.7%	4
Worthing West	Sonya Mallin	3,274	6.4%	4
Wrexham	Tim Morgan	1,339	3.3%	6
Wycombe	Catherine Bunting	2,193	4.9%	6
Wyre Forest	John Davis	2,443	5.4%	5
Wythenshawe and Sale East	Melanie Earp	4,133	10.6%	4
Yeovil	Serena Wootton	2,403	4.9%	5
York Central	Lars Kramm	5,185	12.0%	3
York Outer	Michael Kearney	2,212	4.3%	5

=== By-elections ===
The party came second in the 2008 Haltemprice and Howden by-election, although unusually Labour and the Liberal Democrats did not stand candidates.

The Richmond Green Party voted against standing in the 2016 Richmond Park by-election and to back the Liberal Democrat candidate. On 3 November, the Kingston Green Party did the same, and confirmed that there would not be a Green Party candidate in the by-election.

The Party stated that following the murder of the incumbent MP Jo Cox that it would not contest the 2016 Batley and Spen by-election. Similarly, following the murder of the incumbent MP David Amess, the Green Party stated that it would not contest the 2022 Southend West by-election.

Year	Constituency	Candidate	Votes	%	±	Notes
1976	Walsall North	Jonathan Tyler	181	0.5	Steady	Debut of the Ecology Party at a UK by-election.
1979	Manchester Central	John Foster	129	1.2	Steady	Stood as Ecology Party.
1979	South West Hertfordshire	Nigel Jeskins	602	1.6	Steady	Stood as Ecology Party.
1980	Glasgow Central	David Mellor	45	0.6	Steady	Stood as Ecology Party.
1981	Warrington	Neil Chantrell	219	0.8	Steady	Stood as Ecology Party.
1981	Croydon North West	John Foster	155	0.4	Steady	Stood as Ecology Party.
1983	Bermondsey	George Hannah	45	0.2	Steady	Stood as Ecology Party.
1987	Greenwich	Graham Bell	264	0.8	Steady	Debut of a Green Party (UK) candidate at a UK by-election.
1987	Truro	Howard Hoptrough	403	0.8	Steady	
1988	Kensington	Phylip Hobson	572	2.4	▲0.7%	Phylip Hobson was only 19yrs old at the time of the election when the minimum age for an MP was 21.
1988	Glasgow Govan	George Campbell	345	1.1	Steady	
1988	Epping Forest	Andrew Simms	672	2.0	Steady	
1989	Richmond	Robert Upshall	1,473	2.8	Steady	
1989	Vale of Glamorgan	Marilyn Wakefield	971	2.0	Steady	
1989	Glasgow Central	Irene Brandt	1,019	3.8	▲2.9%	
1989	Vauxhall	Henry Bewley	1,767	6.1	▲4.3%	First time Green Party retained a deposit at a by-election.
1990	Mid Staffordshire	Robert Saunders	1,215	2.2	Steady	
May 1990	Bootle	Sean Brady	1,269	3.6	Steady	
1990	Knowsley South	Richard Georgeson	656	3.1	Steady	Debut of Green Party of England and Wales at a UK by-election.
1990	Eastbourne	David Aherne	553	1.2	▼0.4%	
Nov 1990	Bootle	Sean Brady	557	2.0	▼1.6%	
1990	Bradford North	Michael Knott	447	1.2	Steady	
1991	Ribble Valley	Haldora Ingham	466	1.0	Steady	
1991	Monmouth	Melvin Witherden	277	0.6	Steady	Stood as a joint candidate with Plaid Cymru.
1991	Langbaurgh	Gerald Parr	456	0.9	Steady	
1993	Newbury	Jim Wallis	341	0.6	▼0.2%	
1996	Hemsworth	Peg Alexander	157	0.7	Steady	
1999	Leeds Central	David Blackburn	478	3.7	Steady	
1999	Wigan	Chris Maile	190	1.2	▲0.2%	
1999	Kensington and Chelsea	Hugo Charlton	446	2.3	Steady	
2000	Tottenham	Peter Budge	606	3.7	▲0.9%	
2000	Preston	Richard Merrick	441	2.1	Steady	
2001	Ipswich	Tony Slade	255	0.9	Steady	
2002	Ogmore	Jonathan Spink	250	1.4	Steady	
2003	Brent East	Noel Lynch	638	3.1	▼1.6%	
2004	Hartlepool	Iris Ryder	255	0.8	Steady	
2006	Bromley and Chislehurst	Ann Garrett	811	2.8	▼0.4%	
2007	Ealing Southall	Sarah Edwards	1,135	3.1	▼1.5%	
2007	Sedgefield	Christopher Haine	348	1.2	Steady	
2008	Crewe and Nantwich	Robert Smith	359	0.9	Steady	
2008	Henley	Mark Stevenson	1,321	3.8	▲0.5%	
2008	Haltemprice and Howden	Shan Oakes	1,758	7.4	Steady	Party placed 2nd
2009	Norwich North	Rupert Read	3,350	9.7	▲7.0%	
2011	Oldham East and Saddleworth	Peter Allen	530	1.5	Steady	
2011	Feltham and Heston	Daniel Goldsmith	426	1.8	▲0.7%	
2012	Bradford West	Dawud Islam	481	1.5	▼0.8%	
2012	Manchester Central	Tom Dylan	652	3.9	▲1.6%	
2012	Corby	Jonathan Hornett	378	1.1	Steady	
2012	Cardiff South and Penarth	Anthony Slaughter	800	4.1	▲2.9%	
2012	Croydon North	Shasha Khan	855	3.5	▲1.5%	
2014	Wythenshawe and Sale East	Nigel Woodcock	748	3.1	Steady	
2014	Newark	David Kirwan	1,057	2.7	Steady	
2014	Clacton	Chris Southall	688	1.9	▲0.7%	
2014	Heywood and Middleton	Abi Jackson	870	3.1	Steady	
2014	Rochester and Strood	Clive Gregory	1,692	4.2	▲2.7%	
2015	Oldham West and Royton	Simeon Hart	249	0.9	▼1%	
2016	Ogmore	Laurie Brophy	754	2.1	Steady	
2016	Sheffield Brightside and Hillsborough	Christine Gilligan Kubo	938	4.2	▼0.1%	
2016	Tooting	Esther Obiri-Darko	830	2.6	▼1.5%	
2016	Witney	Larry Sanders	1,363	3.5	▼1.6%	
2017	Copeland	Jack Lenox	515	1.7	▼1.3%	
2017	Stoke-on-Trent Central	Adam Colclough	294	1.4	▼2.2%	
2018	Lewisham East	Rosamund Adoo-Kissi-Debrah	788	3.6	▲1.9%	
2019	Newport West	Amelia Womack	924	3.9	▲2.8%	
2019	Peterborough	Joseph Wells	1,035	3.1	▲1.3%	
2021	Hartlepool	Rachel Featherstone	358	1.2	Steady	
2021	Chesham and Amersham	Carolyne Culver	1,480	3.9	▼1.6%	
2021	Old Bexley and Sidcup	Jonathan Rooks	830	3.8	▲0.6%	
2021	North Shropshire	Duncan Kerr	1,738	4.6	▲1.4%	
2022	Birmingham Erdington	Siobhan Harper-Nunes	236	1.4	▼0.4%	
2022	Tiverton and Honiton	Gill Westcott	1,064	2.5	▼1.3%	
2022	Wakefield	Ashley Routh	587	2.1	▲2.1%	
2022	City of Chester	Paul Bowers	987	3.5	▲0.9%	
2022	Stretford and Urmston	Dan Jerrome	789	4.3	▲1.6%	
2023	West Lancashire	Peter Cranie	646	2.8	▲0.4%	
2023	Selby & Ainsty	Arnold Warneken	1,838	5.1	▲1.9%	
2023	Somerton & Frome	Martin Dimery	3,944	10.2	▲5.1%	
2023	Uxbridge & South Ruislip	Sarah Green	893	2.9	▲0.7%	
2023	Mid Bedfordshire	Cade Sibley	732	1.8	▼2.0%	
2023	Tamworth	Sue Howarth	417	1.6	▼0.4%	
2024	Kingswood	Lorraine Francis	1,450	5.8	▲3.4%	Deposit retained.
2024	Wellingborough	Will Morris	1,020	3.4	▼0.1%	
2024	Rochdale	Guy Otten (Note: The Green Party withdrew Otten's endorsement on 7 February 2024. His name will remain as a Green Party candidate on the ballot paper.)	436	1.4	▼0.7%	
2024	Blackpool South	Ben Thomas	368	2.0	▲0.3%	
2025	Runcorn and Helsby	Chris Copeland	2,314	7.1	▲0.7%	Deposit retained.
2026	Gorton and Denton	Hannah Spencer	14,980	40.6	▲27.4%	First Green by-election victory & highest vote-share in a by-election.
2026	Makerfield	Sarah Wakefield	308	0.7	▼3.7%	
2026	Holborn and St Pancras	Zack Polanski	8,928	32.8	▲22.4%	

== European Parliament elections ==
=== Summary performance ===
Year	Votes won	% of Votes	Change	MEPs elected	Change	Note
1979	17,953	0.1	New	0	Steady	as Ecology Party
1984	70,853	0.5	▲0.4	0	Steady	as Ecology Party
1989	2,299,287	14.5	▲14.0	0	Steady	as Green Party (UK). Highest ever Green result in the UK.
1994	471,269	3.0	▼11.5	0	Steady	
1999	568,236	5.3	▲2.3	2	▲2	First two MEPs elected
2004	1,033,093	5.6	▲0.3	2	Steady	
2009	1,223,303	7.8	▲2.2	2	Steady	
2014	1,136,670	6.9	▼0.9	3	▲1	First seat gain since 1999
2019	1,881,306	11.8	▲4.9	7	▲4	Highest number of Green MEPs elected, best Green Party E&W result ever.

=== European Parliament election 2009 ===
In the June 2009 European Parliament election the party secured 1,223,303 votes or 7.8% of the popular vote compared to its 2004 vote share of 5.6%. Green MEPs Caroline Lucas in the South East and Jean Lambert in London were re-elected. The Greens came first in Norwich with 25%, Oxford with 26% and Brighton and Hove with 31%, but it failed to gain any extra MEPs.

The regional breakdown of the vote was as follows:

Constituency	Candidates	Votes	%	±%
East Midlands	Sue Blount, Richard Mallender, Ashley Baxter, Matthew Follett, Barney Smith	83,939	6.8	▲1.4
East of England	Rupert Read, Peter Lynn, James Abbott, Marc Scheimann, Angela Thomson, Andrew Stringer, Amy Drayson	141,016	8.8	▲3.2
London	Jean Lambert MEP, Ute Michel, Shahrar Ali, Joseph Healy, Miranda Dunn, Shasha Khan, George Graham, Priya Shah	190,589	10.9	▲2.5
North East England	Shirley Ford, Iris Ryder, Nic Best	34,081	5.8	▲1.0
North West England	Peter Cranie, Maria Whitelegg, Ruth Bergan, Samir Chatterjee, Jill Perry, Justine Hall, Margaret Westbrook, Geoff Smith	127,133	7.7	▲2.1
South East England	Caroline Lucas MEP, Keith Taylor, Derek Wall, Miriam Kennet, Jason Kitcat, Hazel Dawe, Jonathan Essex, Matthew Ledbury, Steve Dawe, Beverley Golden	271,506	11.6	▲3.8
South West England	Ricky Knight, Roger Creagh-Osborne, Molly Scott Cato, Richard Lawson, Chloë Somers, David Taylor	144,179	9.3	▲2.1
West Midlands	Felicity Norman, Peter Tinsley, Chris Williams, Ian Davison, Vicky Dunn, Dave Wall	88,244	6.2	▲1.1
Yorkshire and the Humber	Martin Hemingway, Shan Oakes, Leslie Rowe, Kevin Warnes, Lesley Hedges, Steve Barnard	104,456	8.5	▲2.8
Wales	Jake Griffiths, Kay Roney, Ann Were, John Matthews	38,160	5.6	▲2.0

=== European Parliament election 2014 ===
In the 2014 election, the Greens gained a seat for the first time since 1999, with Molly Scott Cato being elected as MEP for South West England, where the party's vote share rose by 1.8%. However, the party's vote fell in every other region, and there was media speculation that the party had only gained a seat in the South West as a result of An Independence from Europe dividing the UK Independence Party vote.

The regional breakdown of the vote was as follows:

Constituency	Candidates	Votes	%	±%
East Midlands	Katharina Boettge, Sue Mallender, Richard Mallender, Peter Allen, Simon Hales	67,066	6.0	▼0.9
East of England	Rupert Read, Mark Ereira-Guyer, Jill Mills, Ash Haynes, Marc Scheimann, Robert Lindsay, Fiona Radic	133,331	8.5	▼0.3
London	Jean Lambert MEP, Caroline Allen, Haroon Saad, Shahrar Ali, Danny Bates, Tracey Hague, Violeta Vajda, Amelia Womack	196,419	8.9	▼2.0
North East England	Shirley Ford, Alison Whalley, Caroline Robinson	31,605	5.2	▼0.6
North West England	Peter Cranie, Gina Dowding, Laura Bannister, Jill Perry, John Knight, Ulrike Zeshan, Lewis Coyne, Jake Welsh	123,075	7.0	▼0.7
South East England	Keith Taylor, Alexandra Phillips, Derek Wall, Jason Kitcat, Miriam Kennet, Beverley Golden, Jonathan Essex, Jonathan Kent, Stuart Jeffrey, Ray Cunningham	211,706	9.1	▼2.6
South West England	Molly Scott Cato, Emily McIvor, Ricky Knight, Audaye Elesedy, Judy Maciejowska, Mark Chivers	166,447	11.1	▲1.8
West Midlands	Will Duckworth, Aldo Mussi, Vicky Duckworth, Tom Harris, Karl Macnaughton, Duncan Kerr, Laura Katherine Vesty	71,464	5.3	▼0.9
Yorkshire and the Humber	Andrew Cooper, Shan Oakes, Dr Vicky Dunn, Denise Craghill, Martin Hemingway, Kevin Warnes	102,282	7.9	▼0.6
Wales	Pippa Bartolotti, John Matthews, Chris Were, Rosemary Cutler	33,275	4.5	▼1.0

== Local elections ==
The 2026 United Kingdom local elections were the best ever results for the Green Party. This marked the ninth year in a row of green gains with a new record high of 1357 councillors.

Year	Councillors			Councils		
Year	Won	Total	+/- (Note: Because the number of council seats shifts every year due to boundary changes and local government reorganisation, changes are notional changes calculated by the BBC.)	Won	Total	+/-
2006	29	89	▲20	0	0	Steady
2007	62	110	▲17	0	0	Steady
2008	47	117	▲5	0	0	Steady
2009	18	128	▲8	0	0	Steady
2010	36	109	▼8	0	0	Steady
2011	79	136	▲14	0	0	Steady
2012	26	139	▲5	0	0	Steady
2013	22	140	▲5	0	0	Steady
2014	38	156	▲18	0	0	Steady
2015	87	166	▲10	0	0	Steady
2016	45	164	▼3	0	0	Steady
2017	21	168	▲1	0	0	Steady
2018	39	179	▲8	0	0	Steady
2019	265	358	▲194	0	0	Steady
2021	151	442	▲88	0	0	Steady
2022	116	533	▲71	0	0	Steady
2023	481	754	▲241	1	1	▲1
2024	181	802	▲74	0	1	Steady
2025	80	859	▲45	0	1	Steady
2026	587	1357	▲441	5	6	▲5

== Police and Crime Commissioner elections ==
Date	Candidates	Votes	% of total vote	Change	Saved deposits	Commissioners	Change
2012	1	8,484	0.2%	New	1	0	Steady
2016	7	113,957	1.3%	▲1.1%	6	0	Steady
2021	7	274,136	2.4%	▲1.1%	7	0	Steady
2024	8	257,558	3.3%	▲1.1%	8	0	Steady

== London elections ==
=== London local elections ===
Date	Councillors		Councils		Votes		
Date	Seats	Change	Councils	Change	Votes won	% Votes	Change
1990	0	Steady	0	Steady	141,569	5.9	▲4.7
1994	0	Steady	0	Steady	48,798	2.2	▼3.7
1998	2	▲2	0	Steady	50,732	2.9	▲0.7
2002	1	▼1	0	Steady	95,394	5.5	▲2.6
2006	12	▲11	0	Steady	169,160	7.9	▲2.4
2010	2	▼10	0	Steady	248,175	6.6	▼1.3
2014	4	▲2	0	Steady	246,805	9.8	▲3.2
2018	11	▲7	0	Steady	210,881	8.9	▼0.9
2022	18	▲7	0	Steady	275,927	11.9	▲3.0
2026	297	▲279	3	▲3			▲

=== London Assembly elections ===
Date	FPTP Vote	% of Vote	Change	List Vote	% of Vote	Change	AMs	Change
2000	162,457	10.2	N/A	183,910	11.1	N/A	3	N/A
2004	138,242	7.7	▼2.5	160,445	8.6	▼2.5	2	▼1
2008	194,059	8.1	▲0.4	203,465	8.3	▼0.3	2	Steady
2012	188,623	8.5	▲0.5	189,215	8.5	▲0.1	2	Steady
2016	236,809	9.1	▲0.5	207,959	8.0	▼0.6	2	Steady
2021	336,840	13.0	▲3.9	305,452	11.8	▲3.8	3	▲1
2024	319,869	12.9	▼0.1	286,746	11.5	▼0.3	3	Steady

=== London Mayoral elections ===
Date	Candidate	Popular Vote	% of Vote	Change	Place
2000	Darren Johnson	38,121	2.2	N/A	6th
2004	Darren Johnson	57,332	3.1	▲0.9	7th
2008	Siân Berry	77,347	3.2	▲0.1	4th
2012	Jenny Jones	98,913	4.5	▲1.3	3rd
2016	Siân Berry	150,673	5.8	▲1.3	3rd
2021	Siân Berry	197,976	7.8	▲2.0	3rd
2024	Zoë Garbett	145,114	5.8	▼2.0	4th

== Wales Green Party election results ==
=== Senedd elections ===
Date	FPTP Vote	% of Vote	Change	List Vote	% of Vote	Change	Seats	Change
1999	1,002	0.1	N/A	25,858	2.5	N/A	0	N/A
2003	N/A	N/A	▼0.1	30,028	3.5	▲1.0	0	Steady
2007	N/A	N/A	Steady	33,803	3.5	Steady	0	Steady
2011	1,514	0.2	▲0.2	32,649	3.4	▼0.1	0	Steady
2016	25,202	2.5	▲2.3	30,211	3.0	▼0.4	0	Steady
2021	17,817	1.6	▼0.9	48,714	4.4	▲1.4	0	Steady
2026	NA	NA	NA	75,380	6.8	▲2.4	2	▲2

The election in 2026 used a different system for voting with 16 constituencies which combined two UK Westminster parliamentary constituencies and returned six members for each constituency.

==== 2022 ====
Wales Green Party won 8 seats at the 2022 Welsh local elections.

==== 2016 ====
In September 2015, Amelia Womack, then Deputy Leader of GPEW, announced her intention to stand in the National Assembly elections for the Wales Green Party. The Wales Green Party create their own set of devolved policies around devolved issues in Wales. They were hopeful of gaining three Assembly seats from the proportional representation lists in the 2016 elections. In the event, they won none, their vote share fell by 0.4%, and the party dropped to seventh place, behind the single-issue Abolish the Welsh Assembly Party. It was the party's worst result since 1999.

Region	Number of Votes	Proportion of Votes	Change	Candidates
Mid and West Wales	8,222	3.8%	▼0.3%	Alice Hooker-Stroud, Grenville Ham, Pippa Pemberton, Frances Bryant, Brian Dafydd Williams
North Wales	4,789	2.3%	Steady	Duncan Rees, Martin Bennewith, Petra Haig, Gerry Wolff
South Wales Central	7,949	3.4%	▼1.8%	Amelia Womack, Anthony Slaughter, Hannah Pudner, Chris von Ruhland
South Wales East	4,831	2.5%	▼0.2%	Pippa Bartolotti, Ann Were, Chris Were, Katy Beddoe, Andrew Creak
South Wales West	4,420	2.6%	Steady	Lisa Rapado, Charlotte Barlow, Laurence Brophy, Mike Whittall, Russell Kennedy, Thomas Muller

==== 2011 ====
The Wales Green Party again fielded candidates in all 5 top-up regions for the 2011 election. For the first time since 1999, the Greens also stood in a constituency - they once again opted to stand in Ceredigion.

During the 2011 campaign, they specifically targeted Labour voters with the aim of persuading them to use their regional list vote for the Greens, using the slogan "2nd vote Green". They claimed that Labour list votes were "wasted" and that over 70,000 votes in South Wales Central went "in the bin at every election" as Labour had never won a top-up seat in that region.

On this occasion, South Wales Central was the region the party targeted. The region includes Cardiff, with its large student population, and also the constituency of Cardiff Central, the only Liberal Democrat-Labour marginal seat in Wales. Welsh Green leader and South Wales Central candidate Jake Griffiths stated they were also aiming to attract disaffected Liberal Democrat voters in the region.

The Greens polled 32,649 votes, 3.4% of the total votes cast for the regional lists. In South Wales Central, they took over 10,000 votes, 5.2% of the total, though they were still almost 6,000 votes away from winning a seat. The regional results were as follows:

Region	Number of Votes	Proportion of Votes	Change	Candidates
Mid and West Wales	8,660	4.1%	▲0.1%	Leila Kiersch, Marilyn Elson
North Wales	4,406	2.3%	▼0.6%	Dorienne Robinson, Timothy Foster, Peter Haig
South Wales Central	10,774	5.2%	▲1.4%	Jake Griffiths, Sam Coates, John Matthews, Matt Townsend, Teleri Clark
South Wales East	4,857	2.7%	▼0.2%	Chris Were, Pippa Bartolotti, Owen Clarke, Alyson Ayland, Alan Williams
South Wales West	3,952	2.6%	▼1.2%	Keith Ross, Huw Evans, Andy Chyba, Delyth Miller

In Ceredigion, Chris Simpson polled 1,514 votes, or 5.2%. He came fifth out of five candidates.

==== 2007 ====
In 2007, the party again fielded a list of candidates in each of the top-up regions but no candidates for the constituencies. The Wales Green Party proposed that Wales should "be at the forefront of....a green industrial revolution". The party targeted South Wales West - the region where they had performed best in 2003.

The Welsh Greens polled 33,803 votes, or 3.5% of the total, a slight decrease on 2003. The party failed to win any seats, with their best performance this time being Mid and West Wales with 4.0% of the vote. In South Wales West their vote declined by one percentage point, their worst result of the five regions.

Region	Number of Votes	Proportion of Votes	Change	Candidates
Mid and West Wales	8,768	4.0%	▼0.1%	Leila Kiersch, Moth Foster, Marilyn Elson, John Jennings
North Wales	5,660	2.9%	▲0.4%	Jim Killock, Joe Blakesley, Maredudd ap Rheinallt, Wilf Hastings
South Wales Central	7,831	3.8%	▲0.4%	John Matthews, Richard Payne, David Pierce, Nigel Baker
South Wales East	5,414	2.8%	▼0.3%	Ann Were, Alasdair McGowen, Gerry Layton, Owen Clarke
South Wales West	6,130	3.8%	▼1.0%	Rhodri Griffiths, Brig Oubridge, Jane Richmond, Jonathan Spink

==== 2003 ====
In the 2003 election, the party again fielded a list of candidates for each of the electoral regions but this time stood no candidates for the constituencies. The Welsh Greens failed to win any seats, polling 30,028 votes, or 3.5%. Their best performance was in South Wales West where they polled 6,696 votes, or 4.8% of the total.

Region	Number of Votes	Proportion of Votes	Change	Candidates
Mid and West Wales	7,794	4.2%	▲0.7%	Dorienne Robinson, Molly Scott Cato, Timothy Foster, Reg Taylor, Christopher Cato
North Wales	4,200	2.4%	▲0.2%	Klaus Armstrong-Brown, John Walker, Jeremy Hart, Wilfred Hastings, Gilly Boyd, Jim Killock
South Wales Central	6,047	3.3%	▲0.9%	John Matthews, Lynn Farr, Jan Tucker, Sylvia Latham, Paul Beswick
South Wales East	5,291	3.1%	▲1.1%	Peter Varley, Ann Were, Owen Clarke, Ernie Hamer, Gealdine Layton, Teresa Telfer, Matthew Wooton
South Wales West	6,696	4.8%	▲2.4%	Martin Shrewsbury, Jan Cliff, Rhodri Griffiths, Steve Clegg, Deborah James, Tony Young

==== 1999 ====
In the 1999 inaugural election for the National Assembly, the Welsh Greens stood candidates in all five electoral regions used to elect "top-up" members of the assembly. Additionally, one candidate stood for the constituency seat of Ceredigion. The party stated that they aimed to poll around 7% of the vote and win at least one top-up seat.

The Welsh Greens ultimately polled 25,858 votes in the regional lists, 2.5% of the total, and 1,002 constituency votes (3.1%) in Ceredigion. No Welsh Greens were elected.

Region	Number of Votes	Proportion of Votes	Candidates
Mid and West Wales	7,718	3.5%	Dave Bradney, Sarah Scott-Cato, Sue Walker, Timothy Shaw, Timothy Foster
North Wales	4,667	2.2%	Jim Killock, Christopher Busby, Robin Welch, Klaus Armstrong-Brown, Angela Loveridge, Alexandra Plows, Kathryn Turner, Gwilym Morus, Sarah Collick
South Wales Central	5,336	2.5%	Kevin Jakeway, John Matthews, Vivien Turner, Chris Von Ruhland
South Wales East	4,055	2.0%	Roger Coghill, Kevin Williams, Steve Ainley, Elaine Ross, Owen Clarke
South Wales West	4,082	2.4%	Graham Oubridge, Lee Turner, Janet Evans, Simon Phillips

=== European Parliament elections ===
2014

The Wales Green Party nominated four candidates for the European Parliament election, 2014.

- Pippa Bartolotti
- John Matthews
- Roz Cutler
- Christopher Were

2009

In the 2009 European Parliament election in the United Kingdom, the Welsh party failed to gain any seats in the European Parliament, but increased the vote to 5.6% for the four Welsh seats.

2004

In the 2004 elections, the Welsh party failed to gain any seats in the European Parliament (with 3.6% of the vote for the four Welsh seats) and lost their only county council seat (of Klaus Armstrong-Braun in Flintshire).
