= History of the Green Party of England and Wales =

Aspect of British political history

The Green Party of England and Wales (GPEW; or simply the Green Party) is a political party in the United Kingdom. The earliest predecessor to the Green Party was the PEOPLE Party founded in 1972. The Green Party of England and Wales itself was formed in 1990.

From 1991 until 2008 the party was primarily represented by two prinicple speakers, one man and one woman. In 2008, the party replaced this system with the position of Leader of the Green Party. In 2010, Caroline Lucas became the first official Green Party MP, and remained the sole sitting MP for the party until the 2024 general election, in which the party won 4 MPs, Siân Berry, Carla Denyer, Adrian Ramsay and Ellie Chowns. In February 2026, they would win the Gorton and Denton by-election, making Hannah Spencer their 5th MP.

== Background ==
The Green Party of England and Wales has its roots in the PEOPLE Party, which was founded in Coventry in November 1972. It was renamed to the Ecology Party in 1975; in 1985, the party changed its name to the Green Party. In 1989, the party's Scottish branch evolved to establish the independent Scottish Green Party, while the Green Party Northern Ireland is a northern branch of the Green Party of Ireland, leaving the branches in England and Wales to constitute their own party. The Green Party of England and Wales is registered with the Electoral Commission, only as "the Green Party". In the 1989 European Parliament elections, the Green Party polled 15% of the vote with 2.3 million votes, the best performance of a "green" party in a nationwide election. This election gave the Green Party the third-largest share of the vote after the Conservative and Labour parties; because of the first-past-the-post voting system, however, it failed to gain a seat. Many say the success of the party is due to increased respect for environmentalism and the effects of the development boom in southern England in the late 1980s.

== Early years (1990–2008) ==
In 1991, then Green Party spokesman and TV sports presenter David Icke created considerable embarrassment for the Party when he revealed his extreme political and spiritual beliefs. He appeared in a tv drama Die Kinder 1990 episode 4 in his capacity as spokesman. He was subsequently forced to leave the party.

There were six principal speakers in the Green Party until 1991, when changes advocated by the Green 2000 grouping reduced this to two.

Seeking to capitalise on the Greens' success in the European Parliament elections, a group named Green 2000 was established in July 1990, arguing for an internal reorganisation of the party in order to develop it into an active electoral force capable of securing seats in the House of Commons. Its proposed reforms included a more centralised structure, the replacement of the existing party council with a smaller party executive, and the establishment of delegate voting at party conferences. Many party members opposed the reforms, believing that they would undermine the party's internal democracy and, amid the arguments, some members left the party. Although Green 2000 proposals were defeated at the party's 1990 conference, they were overwhelmingly carried at their 1991 conference, resulting in an internal restructuring of the party. Between the end of 1990 and mid-1992, the party lost over half its members, with those polled indicating that frustration over a lack of clear and effective party leadership was a significant reason in their decision. The party fielded more candidates than it had ever done before in the 1992 general election but performed poorly, although it did win its first seat with the election of Cynog Dafis in Ceredigion and Pembroke North, who stood on a join ticket with Plaid Cymru. In 1993, the party adopted its "Basis for Renewal" program in an attempt to bring together conflicting factions and thus saved the party from bankruptcy and potential demise. The party sought to escape its reputation as an environmentalist single-issue party by placing greater emphasis on social policies.

Recognising their poor performance in the 1992 national election, the party decided to focus on gaining support in local elections, targeting wards where there was a pre-existing support base of Green activists. In 1993, future party leader and MP Caroline Lucas gained a seat in Oxfordshire County Council, with other gains following in the 1995 and 1996 local elections.

The Greens sought to build alliances with other parties in the hope of gaining representation at the parliamentary level. In Wales, the Greens endorsed Plaid Cymru candidate Cynog Dafis in the 1992 general election, having worked with him on several environmental initiatives. and he was duly elected on a joint ticket. For the 1997 general election, the Ceredigion branch of the Greens endorsed Dafis as a joint Plaid Cymru/Green candidate, but this generated controversy with the party, with critics believing it improper to build an alliance with a party that did not share all of the Greens' views. In April 1995, the Green National Executive ruled that the party should withdraw from this alliance due to ideological differences.

As the Labour Party shifted to the political centre under the leadership of Tony Blair and his New Labour project, the Greens sought to gain the support of the party's disaffected leftists.

During the 1999 European Parliament elections, the first to be held in the UK using proportional representation, the Greens gained their first Members of the European Parliament (MEPs), Caroline Lucas (South East England) and Jean Lambert (London). At the inaugural London Assembly elections in 2000, the party gained 11% of the vote and returned three Assembly Members (AMs). Although this dropped to two following the 2004 London Assembly elections, the Green AMs proved vital in passing the annual budget of former Mayor Ken Livingstone.

At the 2001 general election, they polled 0.7% of the vote and gained no seats. At the 2004 European Parliamentary elections, the party returned two MEPs the same as in 1999; overall, the party polled 1,033,093 votes. In the 2005 general election, the party gained more than 1% of the vote for the first time and polled more than 10% in the constituencies of Brighton Pavilion and Lewisham Deptford. This growth was due in part to the increasing public visibility of the party as well as growth in support for smaller parties in the UK.

At the 2007 Spring conference of the Green Party, the party voted to hold an internal referendum on whether the party should create a position of party leader, or maintain its system of principle speakers. The result of the referendum six months later was in favour of swapping the principle speakers with the position of Leader of the Green Party of England and Wales.

== Since 2008 ==
=== Caroline Lucas (2008–2012) ===
Lucas speaking as the first Leader of the Green Party at its autumn conference in 2008.

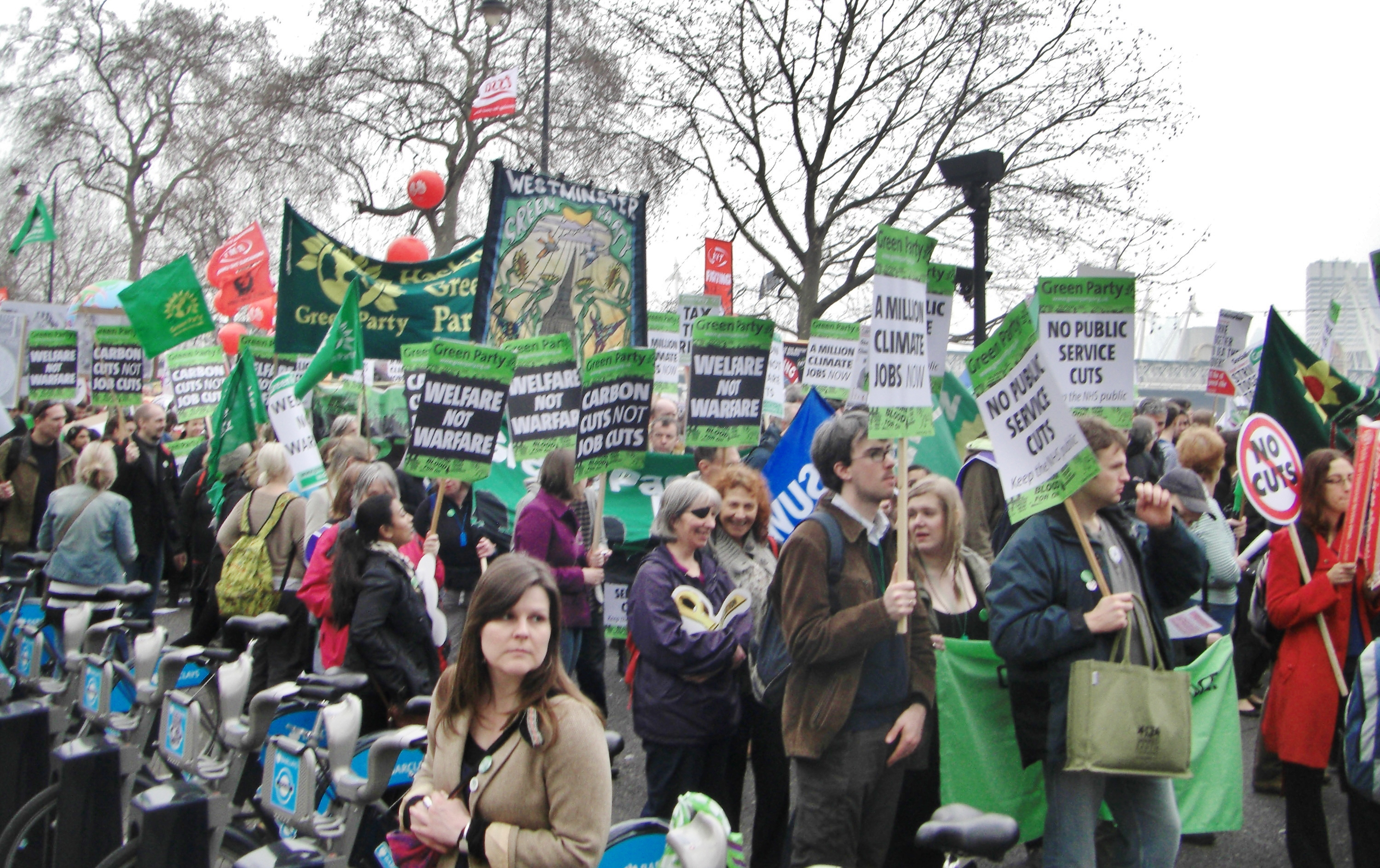
Green Party protestors marching against government cuts in 2011.

In November 2007, the party held an internal referendum to decide on whether it should replace its use of two "principal speakers", one male and the other female, with the more conventional roles of "leader" and "deputy leader"; the motion passed with 73% of the vote. In September 2008, the party then elected its first leader, Caroline Lucas, with Adrian Ramsay elected deputy leader. In the party's first election with Lucas as leader, it retained both its MEPs in the 2009 European elections.

In the 2010 general election, the party returned its first MP. Lucas was returned as MP for the seat of Brighton Pavilion. Following the election, Keith Taylor succeeded her as MEP for South East England. They also saved their deposit in Hove, and Brighton Kemptown.

In the 2011 local government elections in England and Wales, the Green Party in Brighton and Hove took minority control of the City Council by winning 23 seats, five short of an overall majority.

At the 2012 local government elections, the Green Party gained five seats and retained both AMs at the 2012 London Assembly election. At the 2012 London mayoral election, the party's candidate Jenny Jones finished third; she lost her deposit.

=== Natalie Bennett (2012–2016) ===
In May 2012, Lucas announced that she would not seek re-election to the post of party leader. In September, Australian-born former journalist Natalie Bennett was elected party leader and Will Duckworth deputy leader in the leadership election took place. Bennett would take the party further to the left, aiming to make it an anti-austerity party to the left of the Labour Party.

The 2013 local government elections saw overall gains of five seats. The party returned representation for the first time on the councils of Cornwall, Devon, and Essex. At the local government elections the following year, the Greens gained 18 seats overall. In London, the party won four seats, a gain of two. It held seats in Camden and Lewisham, and gaining seats in Islington and Lambeth.

In 2013, there were allegations of factionalism and infighting in the party between liberal, socialist, and eco-anarchist factions.

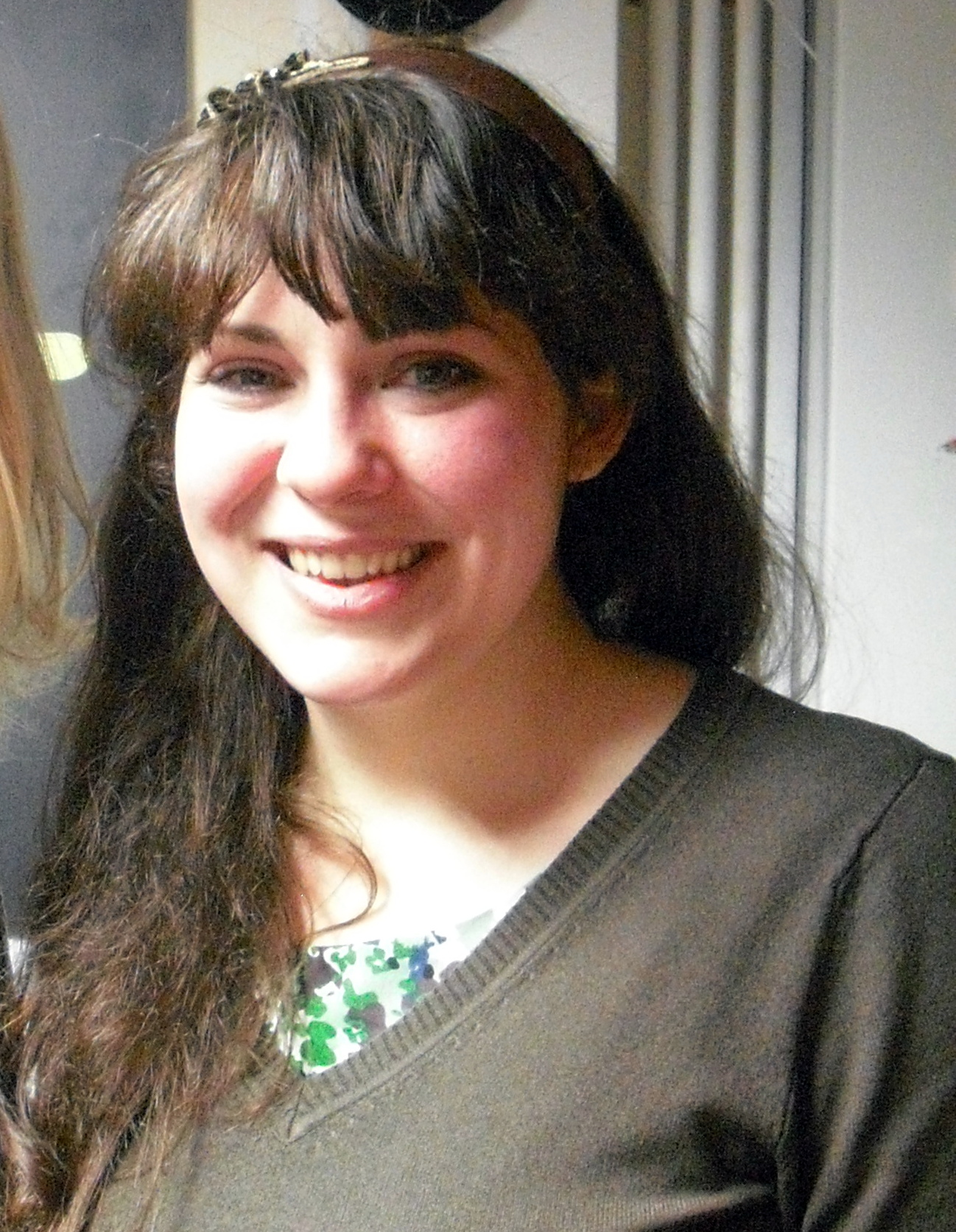
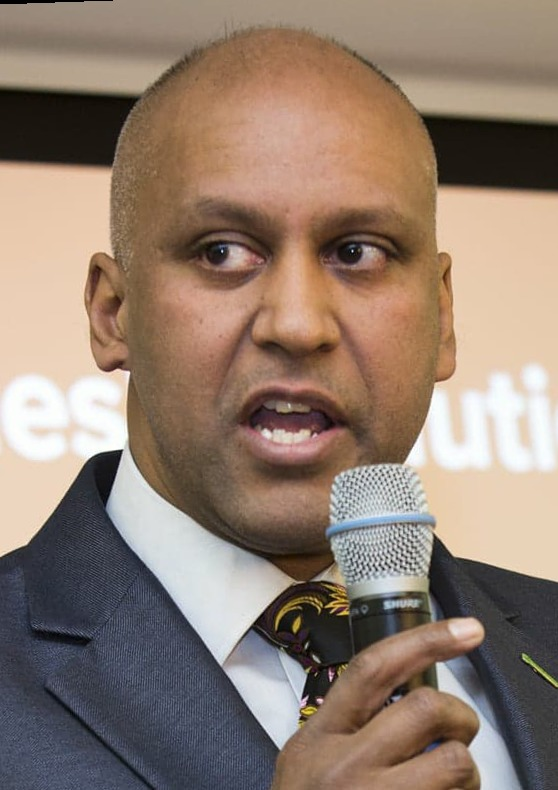
Womack and Ali were voted deputy leaders in 2014. Ali served as a deputy leader until 2016 and Womack until 2022.

At the 2014 European elections, the Green Party finished fourth, above the Liberal Democrats, winning more than 1.2 million votes. The party also increased its European Parliament representation, gaining one seat in the South West England region.

In September 2014, the Green Party held its 2014 leadership elections. Incumbent leader Bennett ran uncontested and retained her status as a party leader. The election also saw a change in the elective format for the position of deputy leader. The party opted to elect two, gender-balanced deputy leaders, instead of one. Amelia Womack and Shahrar Ali won the two positions, succeeding former deputy leader Duckworth.

In the 2010 general election, the Green Party contested roughly 50% of seats. The party announced in October 2014 that Green candidates would be standing for parliament in at least 75% of constituencies in the 2015 general election. Following its rapid increase in membership and support, the Green Party also announced it was targeting twelve key seats for the 2015 general election: its one current seat, Brighton Pavilion, held by Lucas since 2010, Norwich South, a Liberal Democrat seat where June 2014 polling put the Greens in second place behind Labour, Bristol West, another Liberal Democrat seat, where they targeted the student vote, St. Ives, where they received an average of 18% of the vote in county elections, Sheffield Central, Liverpool Riverside, Oxford East, Solihull, Reading East, and three more seats with high student populations – York Central, Cambridge, and Holborn and St. Pancras, where leader Bennett stood as the candidate.

In December 2014, the Green Party announced that it had more than doubled its overall membership from 1 January that year to 30,809. This reflected the increase seen in opinion polls in 2014, with Green Party voting intentions trebling from 2–3% at the start of the year, to 7–8% at the end of the year, on many occasions, coming in fourth place with YouGov's national polls, ahead of the Liberal Democrats, and gaining more than 25% of the vote with 18 to 24-year-olds. This rapid increase in support for the party is referred to by media as the "Green Surge". The hashtag "#GreenSurge" has also been popular on social media (such as Twitter) from Green Party members and supporters and, as of 15 January 2015, the combined Green Party membership in the UK stood at 44,713; greater than the number of members of UKIP (at 41,943), and the Liberal Democrats (at 44,576).

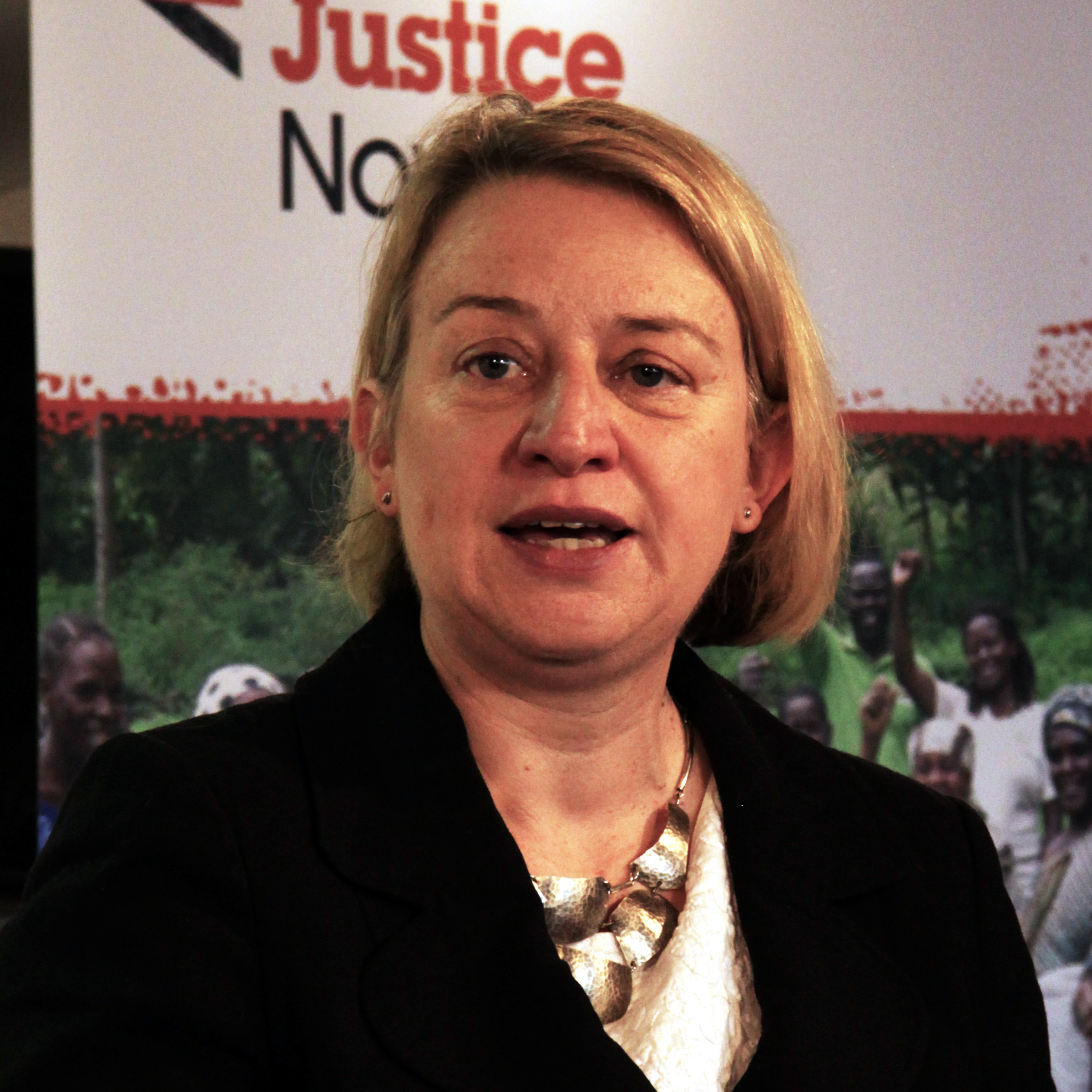
Natalie Bennett in 2015

Views subsequently fell back as the 2015 general election opinion polls arrived: a Press Association poll of polls on 3 April, for example, put the Greens fifth with 5.4%. However, membership statistics continued to surge, with the party attaining 60,000 in England and Wales that April.

At the 2015 general election, Lucas was re-elected in Brighton Pavilion with an increased majority, but the party did not win any other seats. In part due to the greatly increased the number of contested seats of 538 from the 310 at the 2010 election, the Greens received their highest-ever vote share (more than 1.1 million votes), and increased their national share of the vote from 1% to 3.8%. Overnight, the membership numbers increased to more than 63,000. However, at the local government elections the party lost 9 out of their 20 seats on the Brighton and Hove council, losing minority control. Nationwide, the Greens increased their share of councillors, gaining an additional 10 council seats while failing to gain overall control of any individual council.

=== Lucas and Bartley (2016–2018) ===
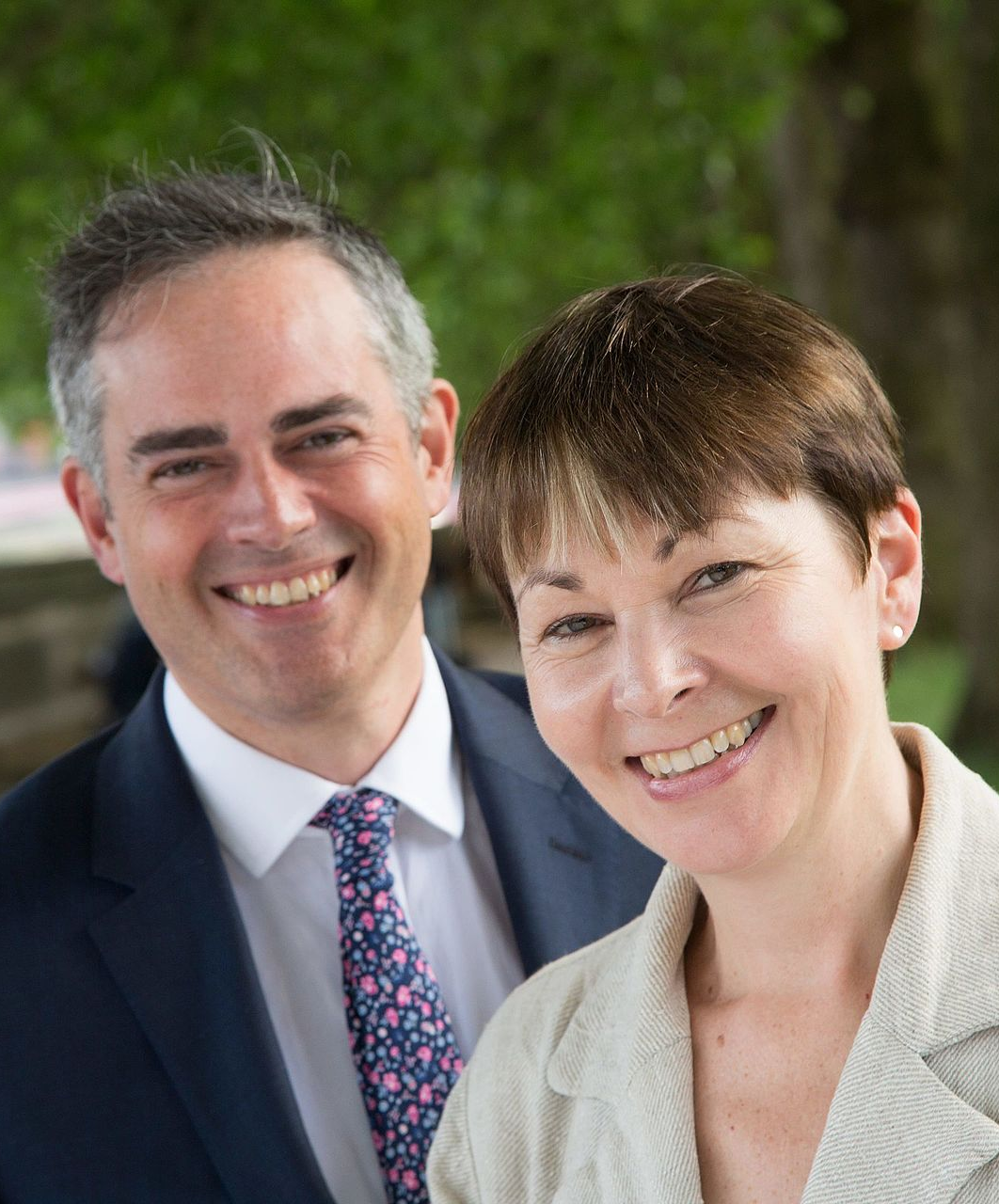
Caroline Lucas and Jonathan Bartley in 2017

On 15 May 2016, Bennett announced she would not be standing for re-election in the party's biennial leadership election due to take place in the summer. Former leader Lucas and Jonathan Bartley announced two weeks later that they intended to stand for leadership as a job share arrangement. Nominations closed at the end of June, with the campaign period taking place in July and voting period in August and the results announced at the party's Autumn Conference in Birmingham from 2–4 September. It was announced on 4 September that Lucas and Bartley would become the party's leaders in a job share.

Lucas first suggested "progressive pacts" to work on a number of issues including combating climate change and for electoral reform, following the results of the 2015 general election. She then reiterated the call alongside Bartley as they announced their plan to share the leadership of the party. Following the vote to leave the European Union in June 2016, Bennett published an open letter, calling for an "anti-Brexit alliance" potentially comprising Labour, the Liberal Democrats and Plaid Cymru to stand in a future snap election in English and Welsh seats. The Green Party stood in 457 seats in the 2017 general election, securing 1.6% of the overall vote, and an average of 2.2% in seats it stood in. While it was a disappointing result after the 2015 success, this was still the second-best Green result in a general election, and Brighton Pavilion remained Green with an increased majority.

On 30 May 2018, Lucas announced she would not seek re-election in the 2018 Green Party of England and Wales leadership election and would stand down as co-leader. On 1 June 2018, Bartley announced a co-leadership bid alongside Siân Berry, former candidate for the Mayor of London in 2008 and 2016.

=== Bartley and Berry (2018–2021) ===
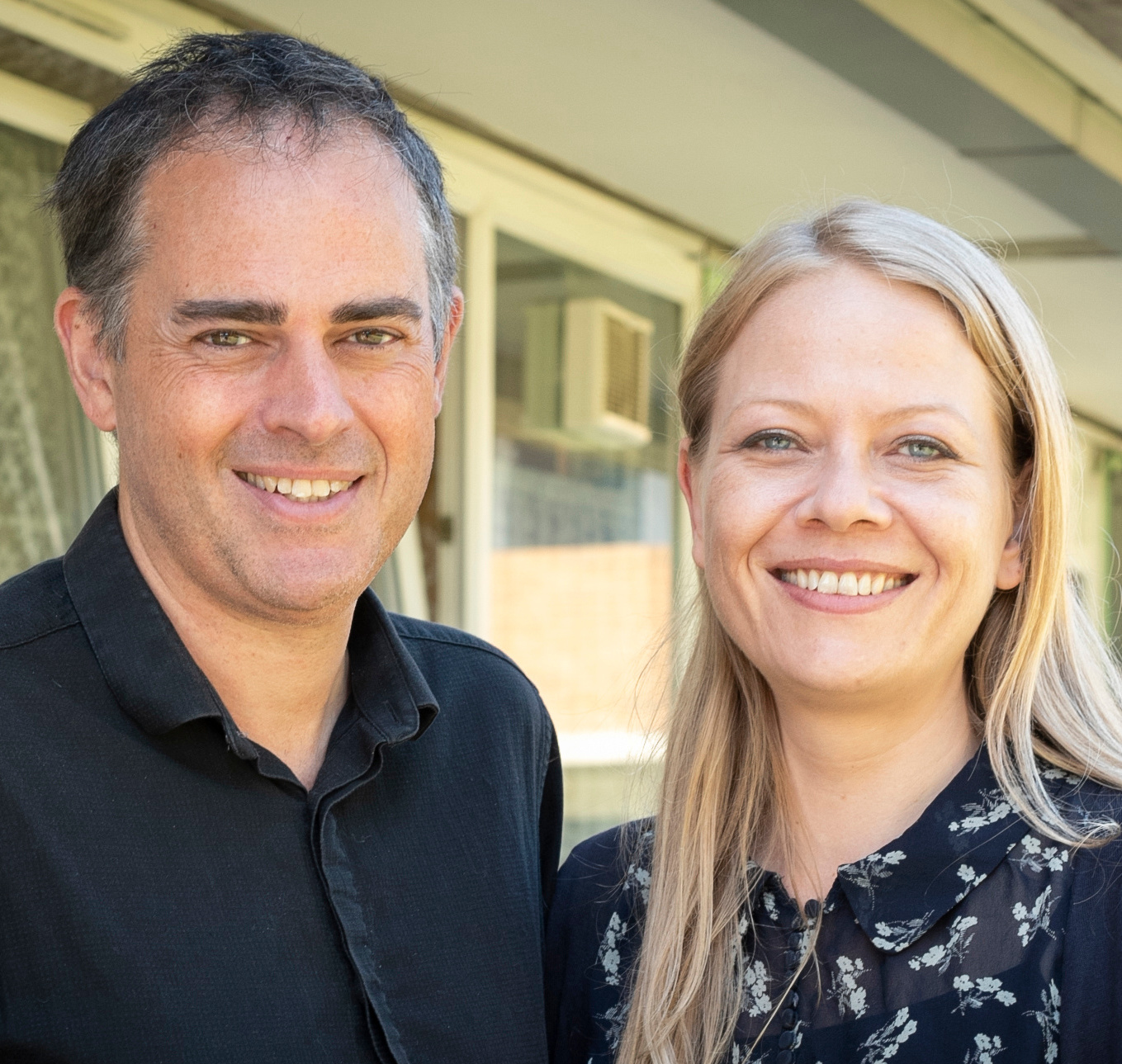
Siân Berry and Jonathan Bartley in 2018

Bartley and Berry were elected as co-leaders in September 2018, winning 6,279 of 8,329 votes. In the 2019 local elections, the Green Party secured their best ever local election result, more than doubling their number of council seats from 178 to 372 councillors. This success was followed by a similarly successful European election where Greens won (including Scottish Greens and the Green Party in Northern Ireland) more than two million votes for the first time since 1989, securing 7 MEPs, up from 3. This included winning seats for the first time in the East of England, North West England, West Midlands and Yorkshire & the Humber.

The membership also saw another climb in 2019, returning to 50,000 members in September.

In September 2020, it was announced that Bartley and Berry had won re-election for another two-year term.

In the 2021 local elections, the Green Party gained their first ever councillors in Northumberland and Stockport, as well as making significant gains in Suffolk and Sheffield. In total 88 seats were gained, challenging the Liberal Democrats to become England's third-largest party.

In July 2021, Bartley announced that he would stand down at the end of the month to give the party time to choose new leadership before the next general election. This triggered the 2021 Green Party of England and Wales leadership election. Berry remained as acting leader, but said she would not stand in the leadership election following disagreements within the party.

=== Denyer and Ramsay (2021–2025) ===
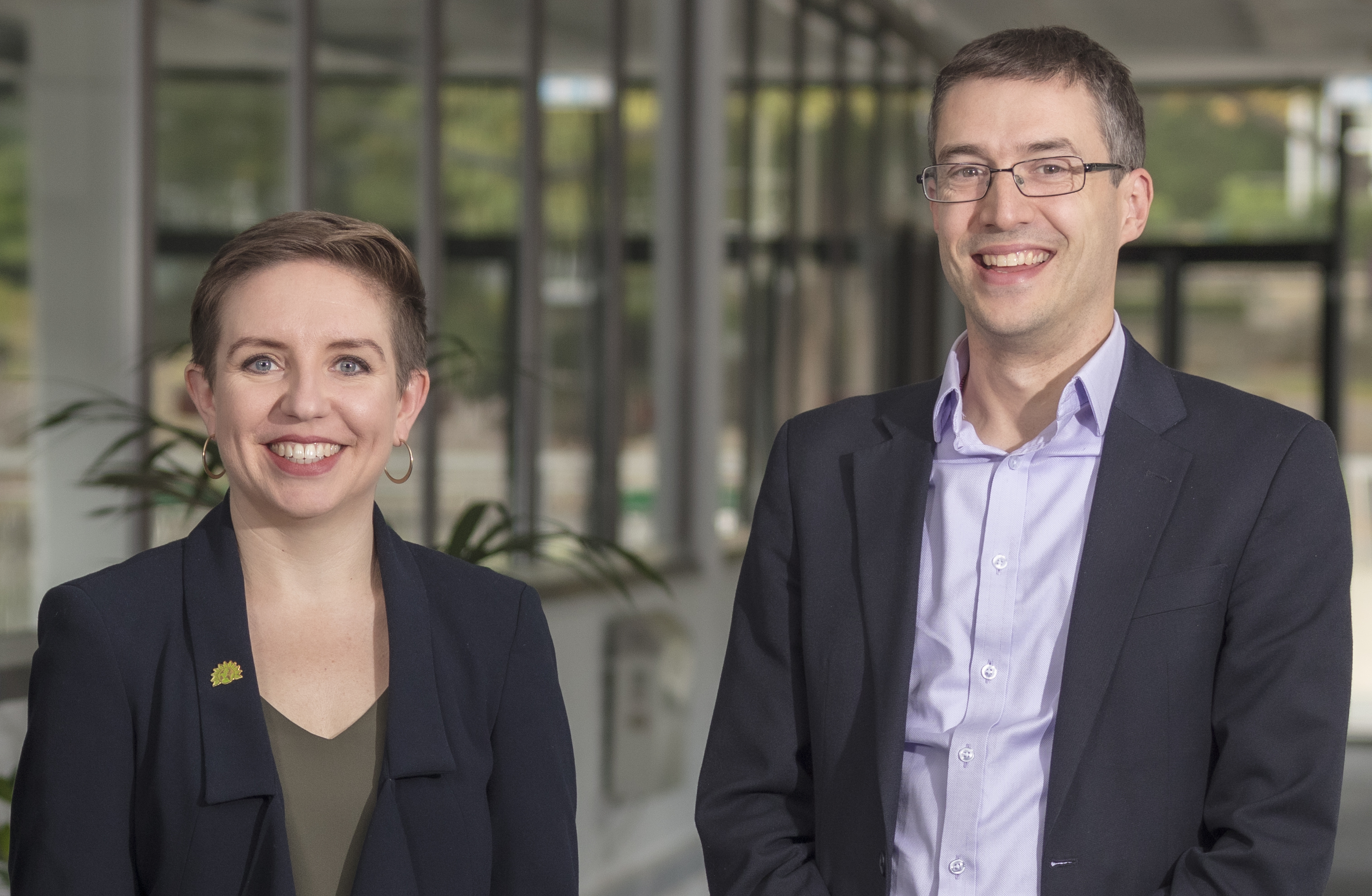
Carla Denyer and Adrian Ramsay in October 2022

The Bristol councillor, Carla Denyer and the former deputy leader, Adrian Ramsay were elected as co-leaders on 1 October 2021. Ramsay stated that "People are looking for a positive alternative to the establishment parties, and finding it in the Greens"; in the first national electoral test of the new leadership in the 2022 local elections the Green Party made a net gain of 71 seats – including in both Conservative and Labour "safe seats".

On 7 September 2022, it was announced that Zack Polanski had been elected as the party's new deputy leader, defeating three election opponents and replacing Amelia Womack, who chose not to re-stand for the position in the election.

In October 2022, at their national conference the Scottish Greens voted to sever ties with the Green Party of England and Wales, specially over the issue of transphobia. In response the Green Party of England and Wales said that trans rights are human rights, that it has strong policies of trans inclusion and that a goal of the party is to be welcoming, inclusive and promote diversity. The party also said it would continue to support the rights of trans people, women and oppressed groups. The LGBTIQA+ Greens also responded by saying it would "continue to fight transphobia".

At the 2023 local elections, the Green Party gained more than 200 councillors across England, and won majority control of Mid Suffolk District Council, the party's first ever council majority. Despite losing control of Brighton and Hove City Council, the Greens became the largest party on East Hertfordshire District Council and Lewes District Council. 2023 saw the party's best ever results in a local election.

In the 2024 local elections, the Greens aimed to make gains in Stroud, Hastings and Worcester. In the south west the Greens became the largest party on Bristol City Council failing to win an outright majority by a single seat. They made a breakthrough in Northern England by winning their first ever seats on Newcastle City Council and Sefton Council. It was noted that the Greens benefited from anger at Labour over the Israel–Gaza war when they won their first seat on Bolton Council. After gaining 74 seats across England and increasing their total to 812, the Greens hailed 2024 as their best ever local election result.

On 8 June 2023, the Green Party's only MP, Caroline Lucas, announced she would not be standing for re-election at the 2024 general election. Former party co-leader, Siân Berry, stood as the Green candidate in Brighton Pavilion. Along with Brighton Pavilion, the Greens targeted three other seats in the general election: Bristol Central, Waveney Valley and North Herefordshire. In what turned out to be the Greens' best ever general election, Berry held Brighton Pavilion, while Denyer gained Bristol Central, defeating Labour incumbent and Shadow Culture Secretary Thangam Debbonaire; Ramsay won Waveney Valley, a notional gain from the Conservatives, and Ellie Chowns won North Herefordshire, defeating Conservative incumbent Bill Wiggin.

=== Zack Polanski (2025–present) ===
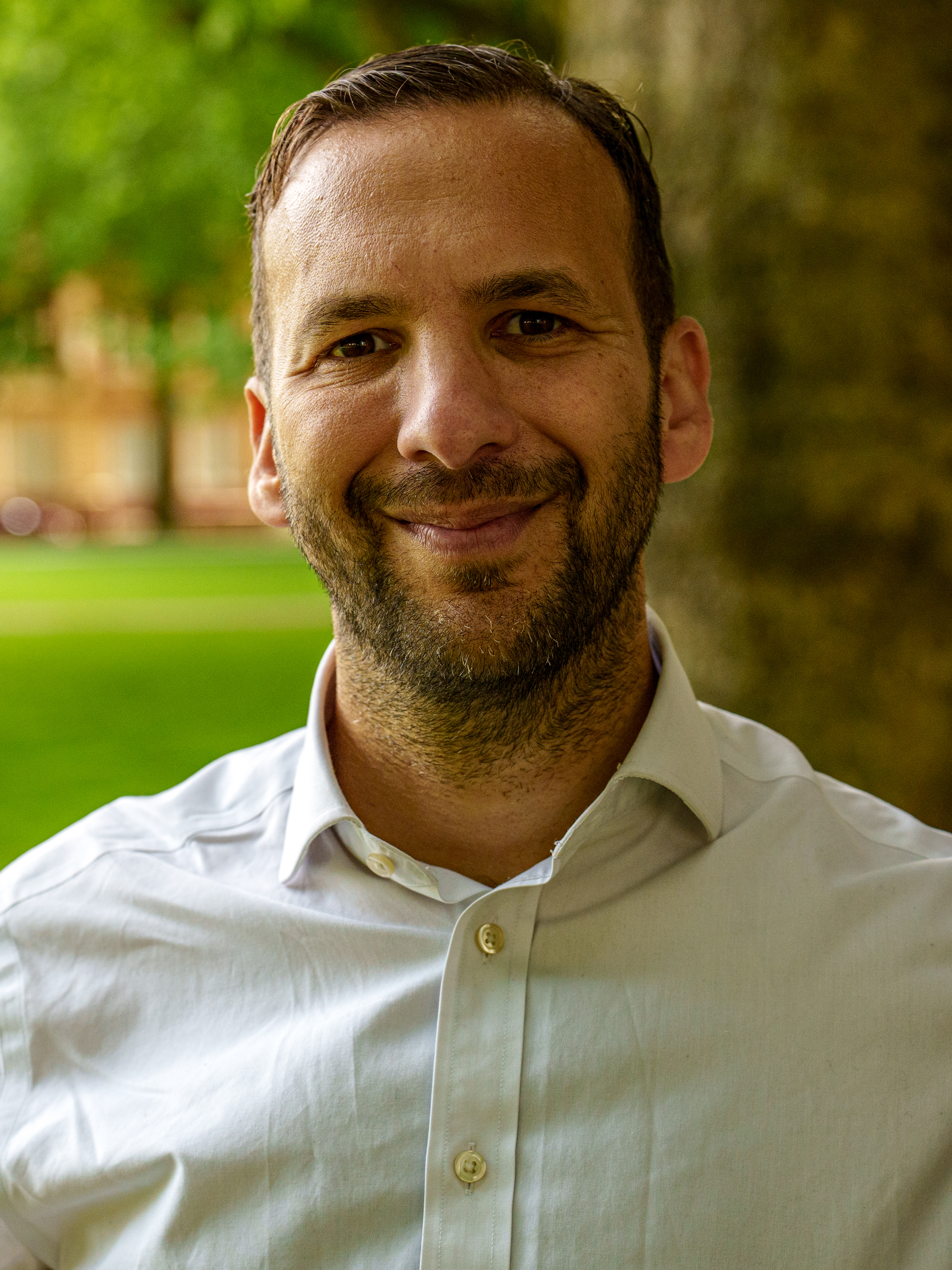
Zack Polanski in 2022

Denyer stepped down as Green Party co-leader to focus on her MP role, as leadership nominations opened on 2 June 2025 with voting running through August 2025. Deputy leader Zack Polanski launched his bid, calling for a bolder party approach.

The results were announced on 2 September 2025, Polanski had won the leadership by a landslide, winning 84.1% of the vote, and marking the first time an incumbent leader of the Green Party was defeated in a leadership election. On the same day, the membership of the Green Party was announced to have grown to 68,500 members, its highest on record.

In the months following Polanski's election victory, the GPEW saw a sharp surge in membership. On 4 October, the party announced that it had overtaken the Liberal Democrats, and reaching 83,000 members. On 15 October, the New Statesman reported that the party had grown to 110,000 members, with its membership having grown by 55% since Polanski's election as leader. Four days after, membership hit 130,000, taking the Greens ahead of the Conservative Party. Two days later on 22 October, GPEW membership hit 140,000. As of 17 December, membership stood at 184,000 members.

Following the resignation of Andrew Gwynne on 22 January 2026, a by-election in Gorton and Denton was scheduled for the 26 February. Polling showed this being a close race between the Greens, The Labour Party and Reform UK, however the Green Party candidate Hannah Spencer ended up winning with 14,980 votes (40.7%), well ahead of Reform UK’s Matt Goodwin and Labour’s Angeliki Stogia, who received 10,578 votes (28.7%) and 9364 votes (25.4%) respectively. This increased the Green Party’s representation in Parliament to 5 MPs, and marked their first ever by-election win.

== Sources ==
- Birch, Sarah (2009). "Real Progress: Prospects for Green Party Support in Britain". Parliamentary Affairs. 62 (1): 53–71. doi:10.1093/pa/gsn037.
- Burchell, Jon (2000). "Here Come the Greens (Again): The Green Party in Britain during the 1990s". Environmental Politics. 9 (3): 145–150. Bibcode:2000EnvPo...9..145B. doi:10.1080/09644010008414543. S2CID 153800709.
- McCulloch, Alistair (1992). "The Green Party in England and Wales: Structure and Development: The Early Years". Environmental Politics. 1 (3): 418–436. Bibcode:1992EnvPo...1..418M. doi:10.1080/09644019208414033.
- Pattie, C. J.; Russell, A. T.; Johnston, R. J. (1991). "Going Green in Britain ? Votes for the Green Party and Attitudes to Green Issues in the Late 1980s". Journal of Rural Studies. 7 (3): 285–297. Bibcode:1991JRurS...7..285P. doi:10.1016/0743-0167(91)90091-6.
- Rootes, Chris (1995). "Britain: Greens in a Cold Climate". The Green Challenge: The Development of Green Parties in Europe. Dick Richardson and Chris Rootes. London and New York: Routledge. pp. 66–90.
