= 2021 Green Party of England and Wales leadership election =

- 2 – 23 September 2021
- Turnout: 11,525 (21.7%) ▲6.3 pp
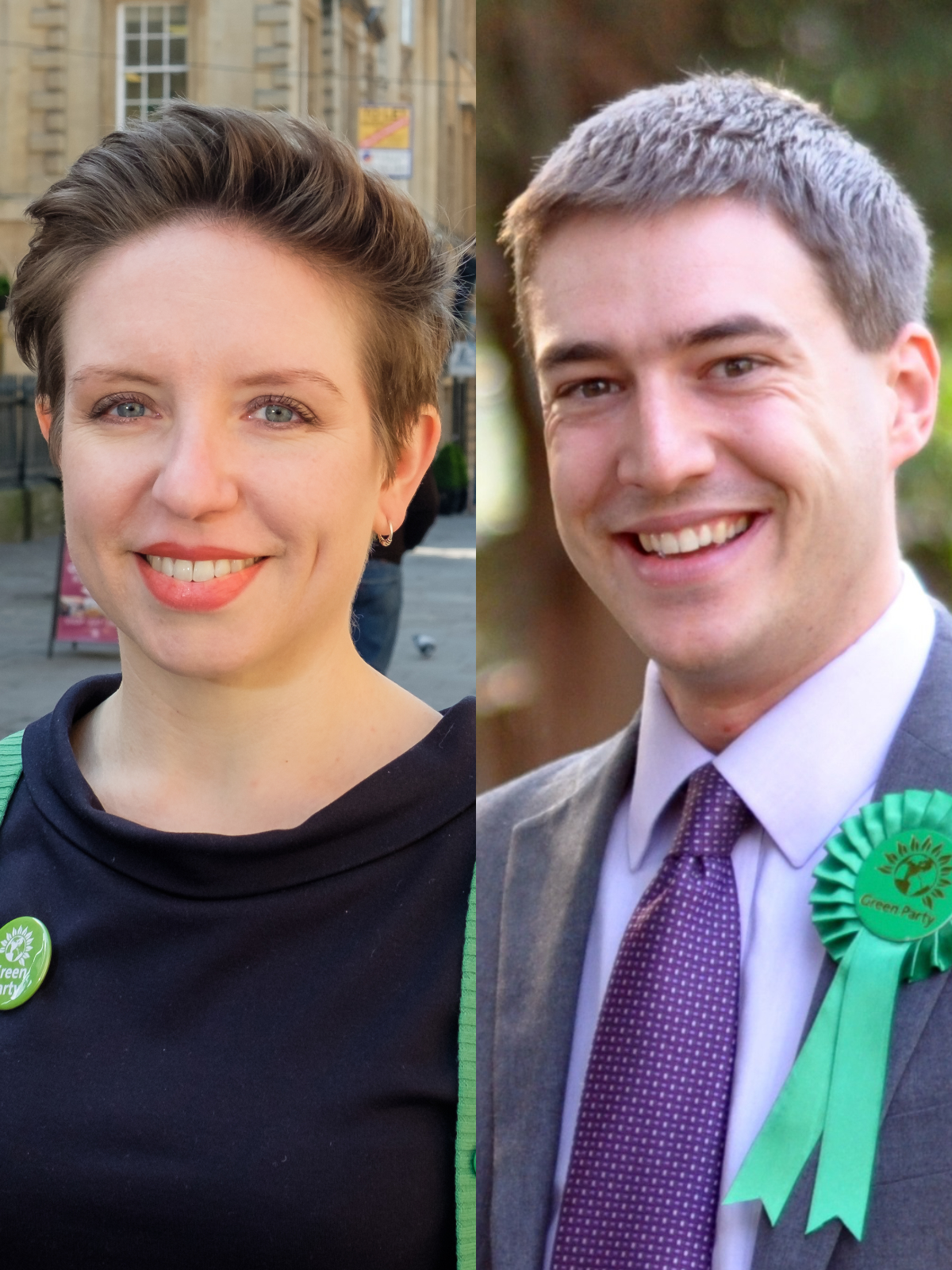

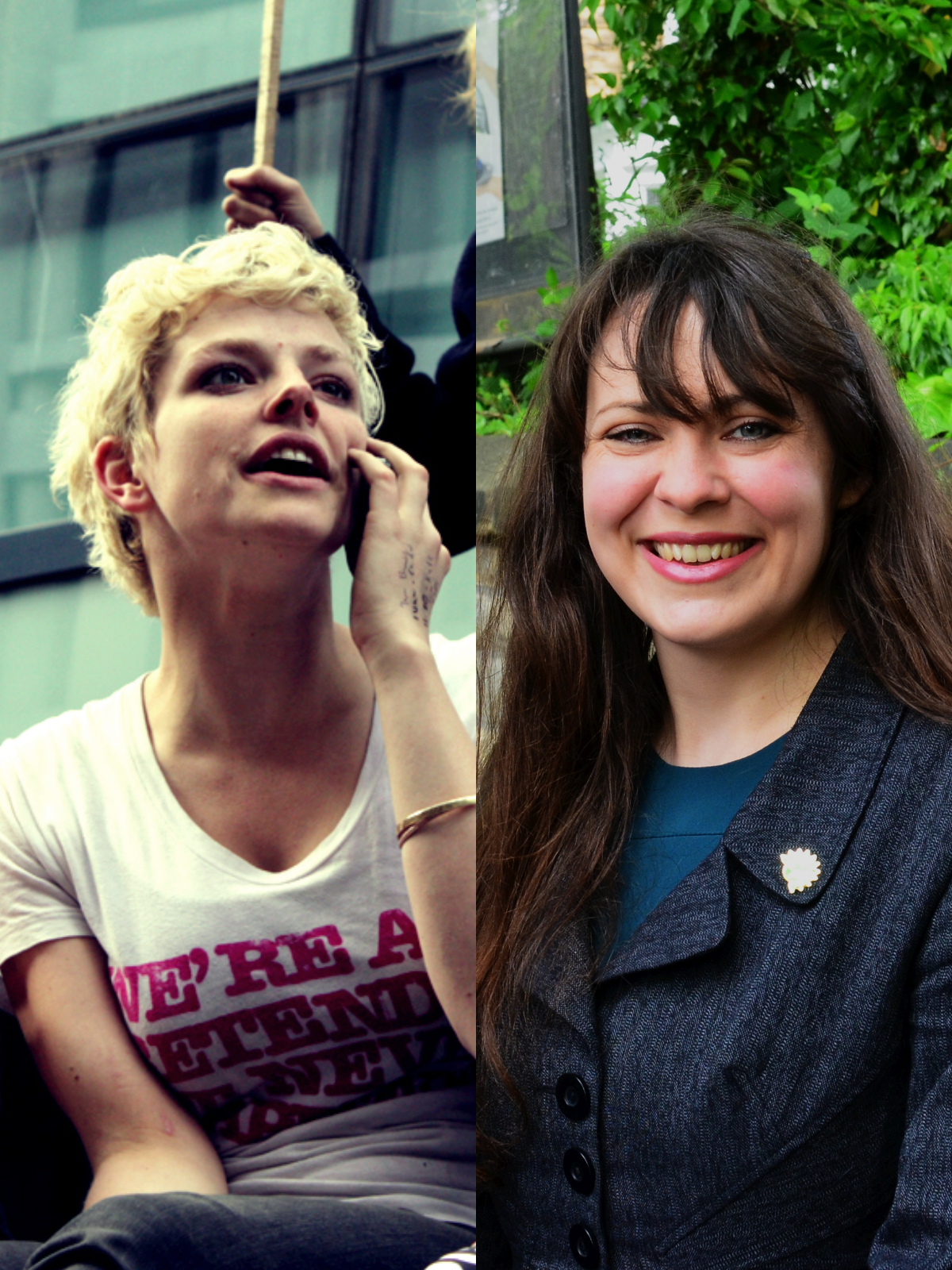

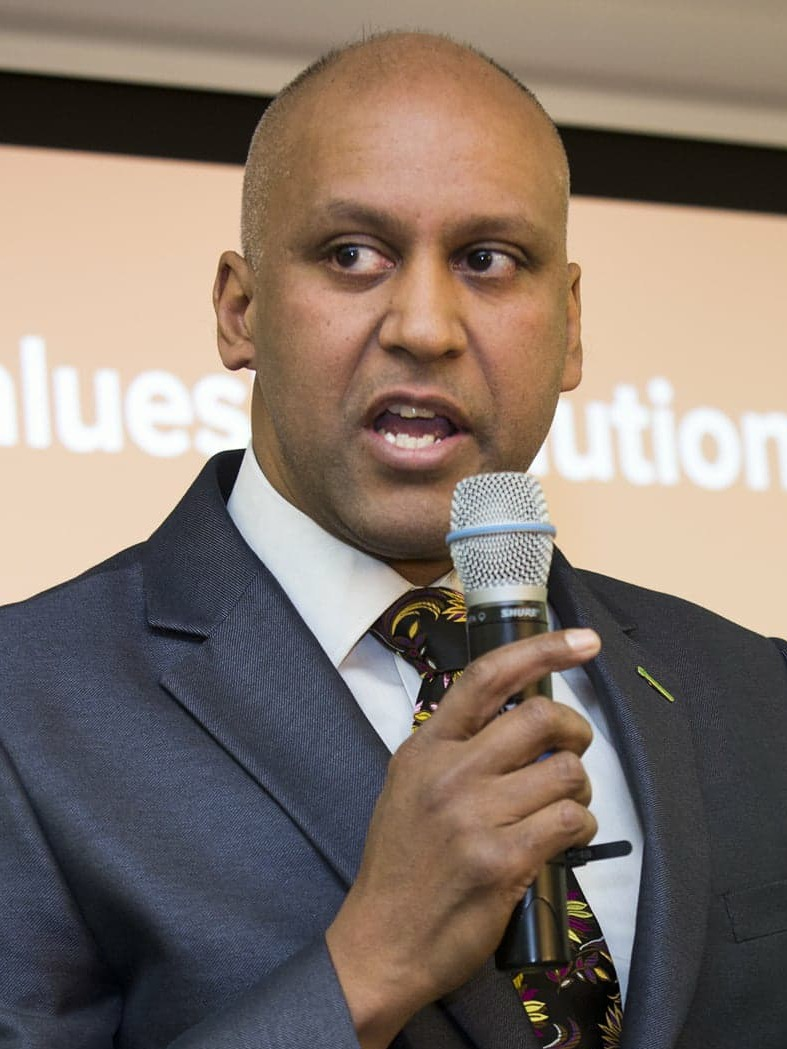
Candidate	Carla Denyer & Adrian Ramsay	Tamsin Omond & Amelia Womack	Shahrar Ali
First pref.	5,062 (43.9%)	3,465 (30.1%)	2,422 (21.0%)
Final round	6,273 (61.7%)	3,902 (38.3%)	Eliminated
Leaders before election
Jonathan Bartley
& Siân Berry
Elected Leaders
Carla Denyer
& Adrian Ramsay

The 2021 Green Party of England and Wales leadership election was held from August to September 2021 to select a new leader or leaders of the Green Party of England and Wales. It was triggered by Jonathan Bartley's announcement on 5 July 2021 that he would be standing down as party co-leader. Bartley had been co-leader of the party since 2016, initially serving with the party's Member of Parliament (MP) Caroline Lucas. Sian Berry, who had served as co-leader with Bartley since 2018, did not seek re-election with a new co-leader or by herself.

The result was announced on 1 October. The election was won by the Bristol councillor Carla Denyer and the party's former deputy leader Adrian Ramsay.

== Background ==
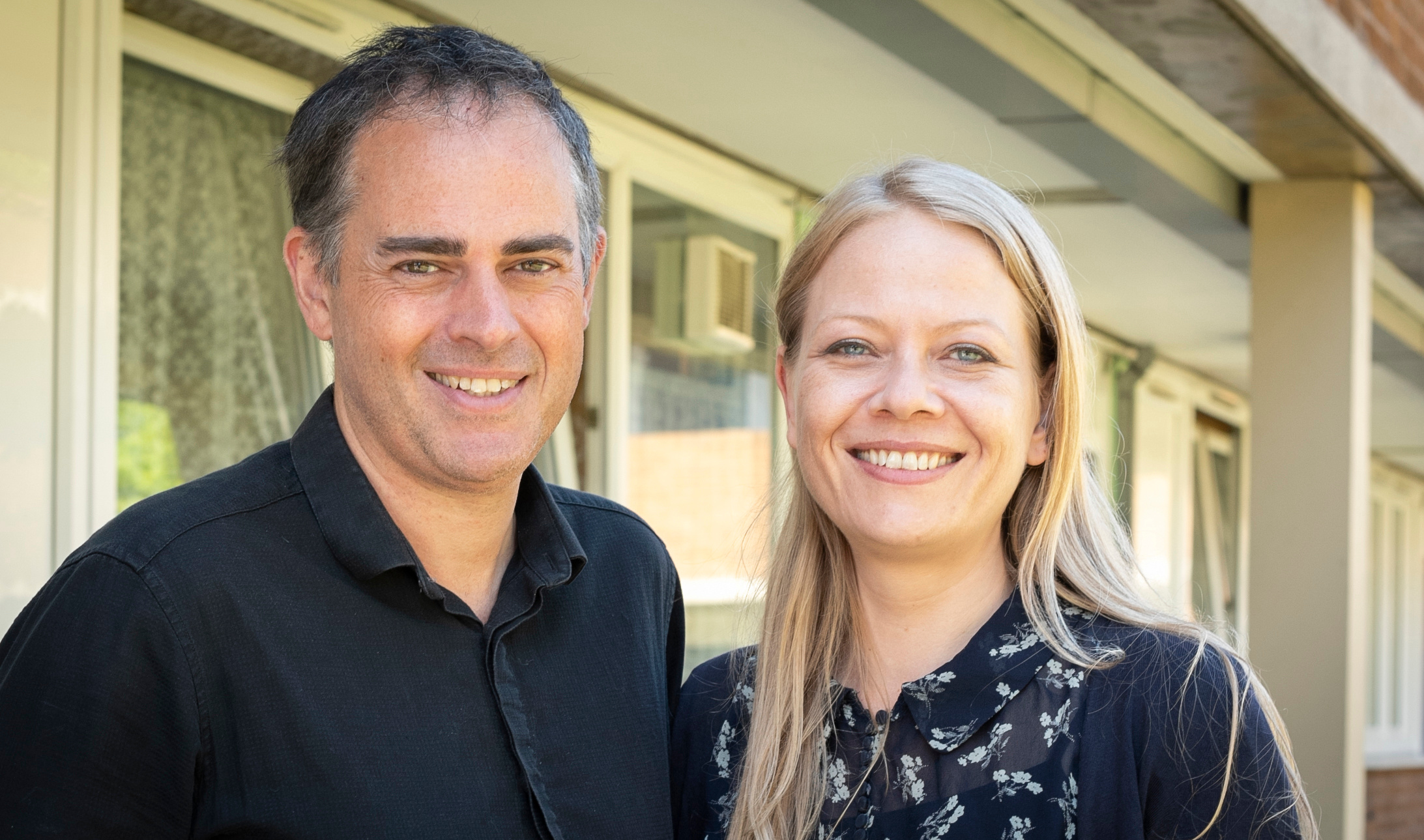
The outgoing leaders, Jonathan Bartley and Siân Berry

The Green Party elects its leader (or two joint leaders), deputy leader (or two co-deputies) and seven other senior positions in even-numbered years. The rules are that co-leaders will have one deputy, but if there is a single leader elected, they will have two deputies. The election process is also subject to balancing for gender: if there are two co-leaders, they must be of different genders, and if there are two co-deputy leaders, they must also be of different genders.

Jonathan Bartley and Siân Berry had served as co-leaders since the 2018 leadership election, with Bartley having previously served as co-leader with the party's only MP, Caroline Lucas. On 5 July 2021, Bartley resigned as leader, triggering a leadership election later in the year, staying as co-leader until 1 August. Berry said she would remain as the party's sole leader, but not stand in the leadership election. In her statement, she cited tension between her positions in support of trans people's rights with the positions of newly appointed members of the party's frontbench. Green Party members told PoliticsHome that they thought Berry was referring to the party's policing and domestic safety spokesperson Shahrar Ali, a conclusion also made by Peter Walker, a political correspondent for The Guardian. On 18 July, the Young Greens passed a motion calling for Ali to be dismissed over comments he had made about LGBT people and trans healthcare offered by GenderGP. Ali had responded to an image of a medic wearing a badge saying "I'm gay" by saying that medical staff "advertising their sexuality" was inappropriate and unprofessional. He proposed a conference motion calling for the trans healthcare clinic GenderGP to be banned, saying that it put "patient safety at risk".

== Electoral process and key dates ==
Nominations opened on 27 July 2021, with candidates having three weeks to declare their intention to run in the election, with nominations closing on 17 August. Anyone that became a member of the party before 27 August was able to vote in the leadership election. Voting began on 2 September and ended on 23 September. Ballots were completed by the single transferable vote, with members ranking the five leadership tickets and the option to re-open nominations.

== Campaign ==
=== Nominations period ===
On 24 July, Martin Hemingway and Tina Rothery announced their joint candidacy. Rothery is an anti-fracking campaigner from Lancashire. She was the party's Parliamentary candidate in Tatton in 2015, receiving 3.8% of the vote, and in Fylde in 2017, receiving 2.7% of the vote. Hemingway is a member of the party's standing orders committee. He was a Labour councillor in Leeds for twelve years before joining the Green Party, becoming the party's lead candidate for Yorkshire and the Humber in the 2009 European Parliament election, and a Parliamentary candidate for the party on several occasions (2005, 2010, 2017, 2019 Leeds North West; 2015 Morley & Outwood). In their statement, the pair committed to "a culture of openness and productive engagement". The Hemingway/Rothery ticket was considered the "most purist" of the joint tickets in terms of their environmentalism.

On 12 August, Tamsin Omond and Amelia Womack announced their joint candidacy with an interview in The Guardian. Omond is an environmental activist who was the party's candidate for East Ham, where they received 2.4% of the vote. If elected, they would be the first trans leader of a national party in the UK. Womack has been the party's deputy leader since 2014 (winning deputy leadership elections in 2014, 2016, 2018 and 2020). She was the party's candidate on several occasions in London and Wales; most recently for Newport West in 2019, winning 2.1% of the vote, and for South Wales East in 2021, on a list that won 4.8% of the vote. The pair said they would publicise the party's environmental policies better, "build a movement" to get more Green candidates elected and support trans people in the party. They also said they will stand up for racial justice and marginalised and diverse communities, as well as opposing austerity. They set a target of at least eight Green MPs by 2030 and said they wanted to attract people who had supported Labour under Jeremy Corbyn but didn't like Keir Starmer. Omond said that the pair's candidacy offered "young intersectional feminist leadership". The Omond/Womack ticket was seen to advocate the Green Party as "the political wing of the climate movement".

On 16 August, Carla Denyer and Adrian Ramsay announced their joint candidacy in the New Statesman. Denyer is a former wind farm engineer and has been a councillor in Bristol since 2016. She was the party's Parliamentary candidate for Bristol West in the 2019 general election, where she came second with 24.9% of the vote. Ramsay was deputy leader of the party from 2008 to 2012, a councillor in Norwich from 2003 to 2011. He was the party's Parliamentary candidate for Norwich South in 2005 and 2010, receiving 7.4% and 14.9% of the vote. They announced their candidacy citing their previous electoral success and committing to get more Green Party politicians elected, including a second Member of Parliament (MP) in addition to the party's former leader Caroline Lucas and the party's first Member of the Senedd (MS).

On 17 August, the day nominations closed, Shahrar Ali announced his candidacy. He is the party's policing and domestic spokesperson, was deputy leader between 2014 and 2016 and stood as a candidate in the 2018 and the 2020 leadership elections. He said he wanted a "debating culture" in the party. The Guardian described him as the "Green frontbencher at [the] centre of trans rights row".

On the same day, the actor Ashley Gunstock announced his candidacy. He had been a candidate in the party's 2008 leadership election and stood for the party in Finchley and Golders Green in 1997, receiving 1.1% of the vote, and then in Leyton and Wanstead in every subsequent election, winning between 1.4% and 7.3% of the vote.

=== Campaign period ===
Peter Walker, a political correspondent for The Guardian, described an "internal consensus" that the race would be between the Denyer/Ramsay ticket and the Omond/Womack ticket. Denyer and Ramsay were seen as the "safer choice" with a more electoral focus whereas Omond and Womack were thought to appeal to younger members with the strongest climate approach.

In an interview with the Morning Star, Ali said he prioritised immediate climate action and that he opposed the Working Definition of Antisemitism. During a hustings event, he said accusations of antisemitism were sometimes made to prevent criticism of Israel.

Denyer and Ramsay set a target for the party to have nine hundred councillors and two MPs by 2025. Denyer said that she supported a one-off progressive alliance between parties for the purpose of electoral reform if the Labour Party were a part of it. She also said that the party needed to devote more resources to discipline in order to process complaints of transphobia and antisemitism as well as incorporating antisemitism guidance into the party's constitution, including the Working Definition of Antisemitism.

Gunstock expressed support for working with other parties in progressive alliance arrangements to defeat the Conservative Party. He said in an interview with Bright Green that "it would be far better accepted if a white middle class man got up and said I believe in the principle aims of Black Lives Matter". He later said that he didn't "feel that the electorate is ready" for a leader of "a different gender, a different race, a different religion" to "say the things [he wants] to say for the party". He later apologised for his comments and accepted criticism he had received for them.

Rothery said that the UK should halt fossil fuel investments. During a hustings event, Hemingway said that antisemitism and transphobia weren't major issues in the party and that if elected, he and Rothery wouldn't take a position on transphobia but form a "balanced position" in the party. The pair focused their campaign on climate issues "to save all life on earth".

Omond and Womack said that in their first hundred days they would visit target seats across England and Wales, meet with experts and journalists to develop policies and promote the party, and develop "a proper process for dealing with hate speech". Omond said that if they and Womack were elected, the pair would establish new processes to deal with hate speech. They pledged to fund election infrastructure better and increase candidate diversity.

=== Voting period ===
The Jewish Greens asked candidates to sign three pledges about antisemitism and the principle of "nothing about us without us". Denyer/Ramsay and Omack/Womond signed all three pledges, Ali signed two, Hemingway/Rothery signed one and Gunstock did not respond. Ali and Hemingway/Rothery said that they did not sign the pledge to support proposed guidance on antisemitism that included both the Working Definition of Antisemitism and the Jerusalem Declaration on Antisemitism as they only supported the latter.

The LGBTIQA+ Greens asked candidates to sign eight pledges about LGBT subjects. Denyer/Ramsay and Omack/Womond signed all eight pledges. Ali signed five and neither Hemingsway/Rothery nor Gunstock responded.

== Candidates ==
=== Nominated ===
Candidate		Slogan	Political office		Announced	Campaign website
Shahrar Ali		Reality Check	Policing and domestic safety spokesperson (2021–2022); Former deputy leader (2014–2016)		17 August 2021	electshahrar.co.uk
Carla Denyer	Adrian Ramsay	Build, Win, Transform	Bristol City Councillor (2015–2024)	Former Deputy leader (2008–2012); Former Norwich City Councillor (2003–2011)	16 August 2021	carlaandadrian.co.uk
Ashley Gunstock		Living up to potential			17 August 2021	
Martin Hemingway	Tina Rothery	Campaigning from the bottom up	Former Leeds City Councillor (for the Labour Party; 1990–2002)	Nanas UK co-founder	24 July 2021	
Tamsin Omond	Amelia Womack	Rooted in communities, for a Green Party that wins	Extinction Rebellion co-founder GPEx Campaigns co-ordinator	Deputy leader (2014–2022); People's Assembly Against Austerity co-chair	12 August 2021	womackomond.green

=== Declined ===
Several Green politicians were speculated about as potential candidates but chose not to stand in the election. These included the councillors Andrew Cooper, Cleo Lake and Rosi Sexton, the London Assembly Member Zack Polanski and the former Parliamentary candidate Rashid Nix.

== Endorsements ==
=== Shahrar Ali ===
- Graham Linehan, television writer and anti-transgender activist
- David Malone, filmmaker and candidate in the 2016 leadership election

=== Carla Denyer and Adrian Ramsay ===
- Scott Ainslie, Lambeth councillor from 2014–present; MEP for London from 2019 to 2020
- Gina Dowding, councillor from 1997 to 2007 and since 2013; MEP for North West England from 2019 to 2020
- Jenny Jones, life peer since 2013; London Assembly Member from 2000 to 2016
- Caroline Lucas, MP for Brighton Pavilion since 2010; party leader from 2008 to 2012 and co-leader from 2016 to 2018; MEP for South East England from 1999 to 2010
- Alex Phillips, Brighton councillor from 2009–present; MEP for South East England from 2019 to 2020
- Molly Scott Cato, economist and MEP for South West England from 2014 to 2020
- Rosi Sexton, athlete, Solihull Metropolitan Borough Councillor and 2020 leadership candidate
- Andrew Simms, author, analyst and co-director of the New Weather Institute

=== Tamsin Omond and Amelia Womack ===
- Maggie Chapman, Scottish Greens MSP for North East Scotland since 2021
- Cara Delevingne, model, actress and singer
- Ross Greer, Scottish Greens MSP for West Scotland since 2016
- Jack Harries, filmmaker and former YouTuber
- Phélim Mac Cafferty, leader of Brighton and Hove City Council
- Gillian Mackay, Scottish Greens MSP for Central Scotland since 2021
- George Monbiot, writer and activist
- Ed O'Brien, guitarist and member of Radiohead
- Caroline Russell, Member of the London Assembly since 2016
- The Subways, rock band
- Peter Tatchell, human rights campaigner

=== Other ===
The incumbent leader Siân Berry endorsed voting for the Denyer/Ramsay and Omond/Womack tickets in either order, followed by voting to re-open nominations. She deleted her endorsement on Twitter on the instructions of the party's returning officer. The former MEP Catherine Rowett also endorsed voting for the Denyer/Ramsay and Omond/Womack tickets without specifying an order.

== Results ==
The results were announced on 1 October. The election was won by Carla Denyer and Adrian Ramsay. Denyer said she would continue to sit on Bristol City Council and the pair outlined a plan to have a Green councillor on every local authority. They listed policy priorities including investment in the transition to carbon neutrality, home insulation, green public transport and more environmentally-friendly food production.

Candidate	First round		Second round	
Candidate	Votes	%	Votes	%
Carla Denyer and Adrian Ramsay	5,062	43.9	6,274	61.7
Tamsin Omond and Amelia Womack	3,465	30.1	3,902	38.3
Shahrar Ali	2,422	21.0	Eliminated	
Martin Hemingway and Tina Rothery	342	3.0	Eliminated	
Ashley Gunstock	212	1.8	Eliminated	
Re-open nominations	22	0.2	Eliminated	
Turnout	11,525	21.7		

== See also ==
- 2022 Green Party of England and Wales deputy leadership election
