= Rosi Sexton =

British politician and mixed martial arts fighter

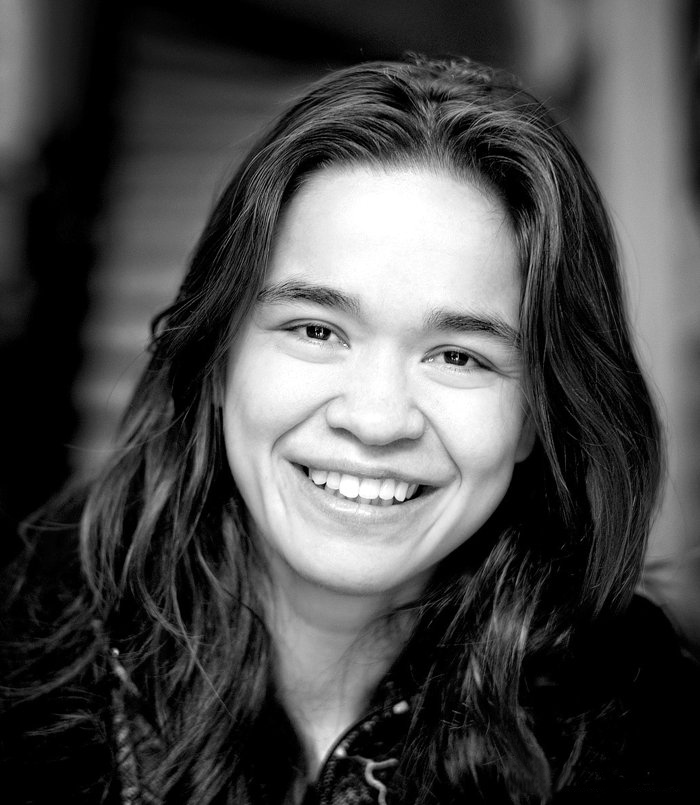
- Portrait of Sexton by Richard Goulding
- Born: Rosemary Ann Sexton; 16 July 1977 (age 49); Versailles, France
- Education: Kendrick School
- Alma mater: University of Cambridge (MMath); University of Manchester (MSc, PhD); Oxford Brookes University (BSc)
- Scientific career
- Fields: Mathematics; Theoretical computer science
- Thesis: A point-free and point-sensitive analysis of the patch assembly (2003)
- Doctoral advisor: Harold Simmons
- Other academic advisors: Timothy Gowers
- Martial arts career
- Other names: The Surgeon
- Nationality: British
- Height: 5 ft 4 in (1.63 m)
- Weight: Bantamweight; Flyweight
- Reach: 64.0 in (163 cm)
- Fighting out of: Manchester, England
- Team: Next Generation
- Rank: Black belt in Tae Kwon Do; Black belt in The Jitsu Foundation's Ju Jitsu; Black belt in Brazilian Jiu-Jitsu
- Years active: 2002–2014 (MMA)

Mixed martial arts record
- Total: 18
- Wins: 13
- By knockout: 2
- By submission: 7
- By decision: 4
- Losses: 5
- By knockout: 3
- By decision: 2

Other information
- Website: rosisexton.com
- Mixed martial arts record from Sherdog

Rosemary Ann Sexton (born 16 July 1977) is a British politician, mathematician, sports therapist, osteopath, and former mixed martial artist.

Sexton obtained a degree in mathematics from the University of Cambridge in 1998, before later obtaining a Master of Science in mathematical logic in 2000 from the University of Manchester and eventually a PhD in theoretical computer science. She began her professional mixed martial arts (MMA) career in 2002, becoming the first Cage Warriors Women's 132 lbs Champion in 2005 in addition to becoming the first British woman to fight in the Ultimate Fighting Championships (UFC) in 2013. She retired from MMA in 2014.

A member of the Green Party of England and Wales, Sexton was elected as a councillor in the Shirley West ward of the Solihull Metropolitan Borough Council in 2019. In 2020, she ran in the Green Party leadership election and came second.

== Education and early life ==
Sexton was born in Versailles, France but moved to Britain at a young age, and grew up and received her education in the United Kingdom. She attended Kendrick School, Reading. Her father commented "what consistently runs through Rosi's life is winning: she has a need to win. Her physics teacher said ‘Rosi has a meticulous approach to her studies and nothing short of perfection satisfies her' ".

=== Music ===
Sexton was a musician and played with the Reading Youth Orchestra while at school (from 1991 to 1995). She reached grade 7 in cello and grade 8 in piano, then became an Associate of the London College of Music Examinations (piano). In November 1994, aged 17, she played in the Royal Albert Hall, with the Reading Youth Orchestra. She also played the organ ("though I never got very good").

=== Mathematics ===
In 1995, Sexton was admitted to Trinity College, Cambridge, where she took a first class degree in mathematics (1998). Her tutor in mathematics was Tim Gowers. She preferred pure maths: her particular interests were logic, combinatorics and number theory. She then moved to the University of Manchester, where she achieved a Master of Science (MSc) degree in mathematical logic in 2000. She went on to complete a PhD in theoretical computer science. Her supervisor was Harold Simmons who held a joint position in the School of Mathematics and the Department of Computer Science, with whom she wrote two papers Point-sensitive and point-free patch constructions. and An ordinal indexed hierarchy of separation properties.

== Political activity ==
In May 2019, Sexton was elected as a Green Party councillor in the Shirley West ward of the Solihull Metropolitan Borough Council. In the same election, her partner Stephen Caudwell was elected as Green Party councillor for the Castle Bromwich ward. She ran in Solihull as a parliamentary candidate in the 2019 general election, losing to Julian Knight and coming in fourth with 3.7% of the vote.

On 28 June 2020, it was announced that Sexton would stand as a candidate in the Green Party of England and Wales leadership election. The results were announced on 9 September 2020: Sexton came second, beaten by incumbent leaders Jonathan Bartley and Siân Berry.

== Mixed martial arts career ==
Sexton had been involved in martial arts since she was at school. She already held dan grades in jujutsu and Taekwondo. In 2000, after 10 years' experience in martial arts, she decided to train in Mixed Martial Arts and Brazilian Jiu-Jitsu, as a way of proving to herself that what she had learned was applicable to real life. A clue to the reason for this career change may be found in her comment "The other things I did, the music, the maths, just weren't quite hard enough"

At the same time, she trained in osteopathy, receiving a degree in that subject from Oxford Brookes University in 2010. She currently practices as an Osteopath in the Birmingham (Solihull) area, with a particular interest in sports injuries and evidence-based practice. She has written about the problem of performance-enhancing drugs (doping) in combat sports, and is a supporter of the Voluntary Anti-Doping Association, VADA. She is a spokesperson for SafeMMA, an organisation dedicated to ensuring safety of competitors, and she runs a combat sports injury clinic. In 2018, aged 41, she was promoted to black belt in BJJ by Paul Rimmer.

=== Early MMA career ===
Sexton made her mixed martial arts debut on 11 May 2002. She won her first five fights before moving up in weight to face Gina Carano on 15 September 2006. Sexton was defeated by knockout late in the second round.

=== BodogFight ===
Sexton debuted for BodogFight on 16 December 2006 and upset Brazilian submission specialist Carina Damm with an armbar late in the first round.

On 17 February 2007, Sexton faced Japanese striker "Windy" Tomomi Sunaba at a BodogFight event in Costa Rica. Sexton won the fight by Technical Decision in the second round after Sunaba suffered a serious ankle injury.

Sexton fought once more for BodogFight and submitted Julia Berezikova on 24 August 2007.

=== EliteXC ===
Sexton signed an exclusive three-fight contract with Elite XC in June 2008. She faced Debi Purcell at the 15 August 2008 ShoXC event in Friant, California and defeated Purcell by split decision.

=== Bellator Fighting Championships ===
Following the demise of Elite XC, Sexton debuted for Bellator Fighting Championships at Bellator 12 on 19 June 2009. She submitted Valerie Coolbaugh with an armbar in the first round.

Sexton was scheduled to face Angela Magaña at CWFC 37: Right To Fight on 22 May 2010, but Magana suffered an injury and Sexton was matched against Emi Fujino. However, due to Sexton's re-signing with Bellator, her CWFC fight was cancelled.

Sexton faced Zoila Gurgel at Bellator 23 on 24 June. She was defeated by knockout exactly two minutes into the first round.

As a result of the knockout loss, Sexton was given a 60-day medical suspension and did not compete in the Bellator women's 115-pound tournament.

=== Cage Warriors Fighting Championship ===
Sexton returned to face Sally Krumdiack at Cage Warriors Fighting Championship 39 on 27 November 2010 in Cork, Ireland. She won via TKO in the second round.

Sexton faced Roxanne Modafferi at Cage Warriors Fighting Championship 40 on 26 February 2011. She defeated Modafferi by unanimous decision.

Sexton was scheduled to face Sheila Gaff at Cage Warriors Fighting Championship 43 on 9 July 2011 for the Cage Warriors Women's Super Flyweight Championship at 125 pounds. However, she suffered a concussion during training and was forced to withdraw from the fight.

On 2 June 2012, Sexton faced Aisling Daly at Cage Warriors Fighting Championship 47. The bout was part of a tournament to crown a Cage Warriors 125-pound women's champion. Sexton defeated Daly by unanimous decision to advance to the tournament final.

Sexton was scheduled to face Sheila Gaff in the finals at Cage Warriors Fighting Championship 49 on 27 October 2012 in Cardiff, Wales. Voluntary Anti-Doping Association (VADA) drug testing was used in the weeks prior to the planned fight. However, the bout was cancelled on 19 October when Gaff withdrew due to illness.

=== Ultimate Fighting Championship ===
Sexton moved up in weight to make her UFC debut in Winnipeg, Manitoba, Canada on the UFC 161 card against Alexis Davis on 15 June 2013. Sexton lost the fight by unanimous decision (29–28, 29–27, and 29–28).

On 26 October 2013, Sexton returned to the Octagon and faced Jéssica Andrade at UFC Fight Night 30. She lost the fight via unanimous decision (30–26, 30–27, and 30–26). Sexton was released from the promotion shortly after the fight.

On 21 June 2014, Sexton announced her retirement from MMA competition.

=== Mixed martial arts record ===
Professional record breakdown
18 matches	13 wins	5 losses
By knockout	2	3
By submission	7	0
By decision	4	2

Res.	Record	Opponent	Method	Event	Date	Round	Time	Location	Notes
Loss	13–5	Joanna Jędrzejczyk	KO (punch)	Cage Warriors Fighting Championship 69	7 June 2014	2	2:36	London, England	
Loss	13–4	Jéssica Andrade	Decision (unanimous)	UFC Fight Night: Machida vs. Munoz	26 October 2013	3	5:00	Manchester, England	
Loss	13–3	Alexis Davis	Decision (unanimous)	UFC 161	15 June 2013	3	5:00	Winnipeg, Manitoba, Canada	
Win	13–2	Aisling Daly	Decision (unanimous)	Cage Warriors: 47	2 June 2012	3	5:00	Dublin, Ireland	CWFC Women's Flyweight Tournament Semifinal.
Win	12–2	Roxanne Modafferi	Decision (unanimous)	Cage Warriors: 40	26 February 2011	3	5:00	North London, England	
Win	11–2	Sally Krumdiack	TKO (punches)	Cage Warriors 39: The Uprising	27 November 2010	2	4:07	Cork, Ireland	
Loss	10–2	Zoila Frausto Gurgel	KO (knee and punches)	Bellator 23	24 June 2010	1	2:00	Louisville, Kentucky, United States	
Win	10–1	Valerie Coolbaugh	Submission (armbar)	Bellator 12	19 June 2009	1	3:40	Hollywood, Florida, United States	
Win	9–1	Debi Purcell	Decision (split)	ShoXC: Hamman vs. Suganuma 2	15 August 2008	3	3:00	Friant, California, United States	
Win	8–1	Julia Berezikova	Submission (armbar)	BodogFight: Vancouver	24 August 2007	2	1:49	Vancouver, British Columbia, Canada	
Win	7–1	Tomomi Sunaba	Technical Decision (unanimous)	BodogFight: Costa Rica	17 February 2007	2	1:05	San José, Costa Rica	
Win	6–1	Carina Damm	Submission (armbar)	BodogFight: St. Petersburg	16 December 2006	1	4:15	Saint Petersburg, Russia	
Loss	5–1	Gina Carano	KO (punch)	World Pro Fighting Championships	15 September 2006	2	4:55	Las Vegas, Nevada, United States	
Win	5–0	Dina Van den Hooven	TKO (corner stoppage)	CWFC: Strike Force 4	26 November 2005	3	5:00	English Midlands, England	Won the inaugural Cage Warriors Women's Bantamweight Championship.
Win	4–0	Kelli Salone	Submission (armbar)	P & G 1: Pride and Glory 1	1 February 2004	1	3:45	Cardiff, Wales	
Win	3–0	Carla O'Sullivan	Submission (rear-naked choke)	CWFC 3: Cage Warriors 3	16 March 2003	1	N/A	Hampshire, England	
Win	2–0	Serena Saunders	Submission (armbar)	CWFC 1: Armageddon	27 July 2002	1	0:40	London, England	
Win	1–0	Angela Boyce	Submission (armbar)	G & S 5: Grapple & Strike 5	11 May 2002	3	N/A	Worcester, England	

=== Mixed martial arts achievements ===
- Cage Warriors Women's 132 lbs Champion (2005)
- BodogFight Women's 125 lbs Champion
- First British woman to fight in the UFC

== Personal life ==
Sexton has one son. In 2010, she qualified as an osteopath after completing her BSc Osteopathy degree at Oxford Brookes University. She has a passion for climbing and in 2017 climbed the highest artificial climbing wall in the world, Luzzone Dam, in Switzerland. The climb was sponsored for the benefit of the Mind charity.

In 2023, Sexton revealed on her personal blog that she had received a diagnosis of autism.
