= Shahrar Ali =

Former Deputy Leader of the Green Party of England and Wales

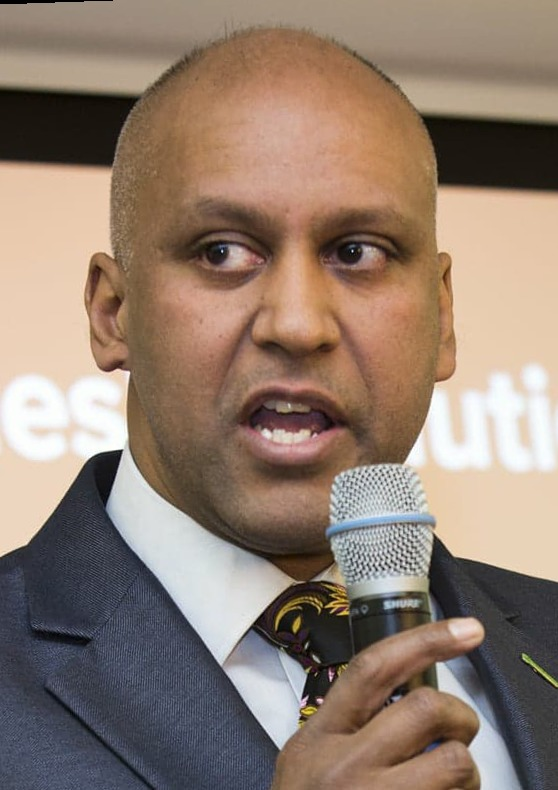

Deputy Leader of the Green Party of England and Wales
- In office 1 September 2014 – 31 August 2016 Serving with Amelia Womack
- Leader: Natalie Bennett
- Preceded by: Will Duckworth
- Succeeded by: Amelia Womack

Personal details
- Born: Mohammad Shahrar Ali
- Party: Green Party of England and Wales (until 2024)
- Education: King's College London (BA); University College London (BEng, MPhil, PhD)

Mohammad Shahrar Ali, known as Shahrar Ali (/ˈʃɑːrɑːr ɑːˈliː/), is a British politician and university manager who served as deputy leader of the Green Party of England and Wales from 2014 to 2016.

He stood for election to be leader of the Green Party in 2018, 2020 and 2021. His public statements on transgender issues and appointment in 2021 as the party's policing and domestic safety spokesperson were believed to be reasons for the party's co-leader Siân Berry stepping down.

In February 2022, Ali launched legal action against the Green Party alleging discrimination of gender-critical belief under the Equality Act 2010. He was subsequently removed from his position as a party spokesperson for alleged breaches of the Speakers’ Code of Conduct. He took legal action over his removal: the Judge ruled that his dismissal was procedurally unfair and that Ali had been subjected to "unlawful discrimination" as a result, but also upheld the party's right to dismiss spokespeople whose views were found to differ from party policy.

In September 2024, Ali was excluded from the Green Party, with the party telling him that any future readmission would be subject to him publicly retracting tweets that had been complained about and undertaking safeguarding training.

== Education and career ==
Shahrar Ali has degrees in biochemical engineering (BEng) and philosophy (BA, MPhil, PhD) from the University of London. His 1997 MPhil thesis was on "Practical reason with reference to the Human conception", and his 2004 PhD thesis (UCL) was entitled "Making as if to stand behind one's words: a theory of intentional deception and lying". His research interests are in moral and applied philosophy.

Before entering politics, Ali worked as a European Parliament researcher. He works in the Institute of Health Sciences Education at Queen Mary, University of London.

== Political career ==
=== Early candidacies (2004–2014) ===
Shahrar Ali stood as a Green Party list candidate for the European Parliament in 2004, 2009 and 2014. He stood as the Green Party candidate for Brent East in the 2005 general election, winning 2.9% of the vote. He was a London Assembly candidate both in Brent and Harrow and in the London-wide list in 2008 and 2012, and stood for Parliamentary election for Brent Central in 2005 and 2010. Ali unsuccessfully sought his party's nomination to be a candidate for the 2008 and 2012 London mayoral elections.

He ran for election to Brent London Borough Council six times from 2005 to 2014, and once for Camden London Borough Council in 2006. In 2009, he successfully campaigned to stop Asda delivery lorries blocking a pavement. He wrote Why Vote Green in 2010.

=== Deputy leader (2014–2016) ===
Ali ran for election to be deputy leader of the Green Party in the 2014 Green Party of England and Wales leadership election. The party's rules meant that two deputy leaders were elected, who needed to be different genders. Amelia Womack was elected first, and Ali was elected second after beating the incumbent, Will Duckworth, and two other male candidates.

In January 2015, Ali released a statement with the party's leader Natalie Bennett and his co-deputy Amelia Womack condemning the Parliamentary candidate for Cambridge, Rupert Read. Read had said that trans women were "a sort of 'opt-in' version of what it means to be a woman" among other remarks about trans people which he later apologised for. For the 2015 election, Ali edited Why Vote Green 2015. He was the party's Parliamentary candidate in Brent Central in 2015 and Bethnal Green and Bow in 2019. In November 2015, Ali was selected to be the third candidate on the Green Party's London-wide list for the 2016 London Assembly election. He was speculated as a potential candidate for the 2016 Green Party leadership election and told The Guardian he might stand. He ended up running for re-election as deputy leader, losing his position and coming in third place.

=== Other roles (2016–2018) ===
In August 2016, Ali joined a march in London calling for slavery reparations. Between 2017 and 2020, Ali served as home affairs spokesperson for the Green Party. He released a statement opposing Cressida Dick's appointment as Commissioner of the Metropolitan Police.

=== Holocaust Memorial Day comments ===
In August 2018, in an article published on the Left Foot Forward blog, the Campaign Against Antisemitism described a speech Ali had made nine years earlier as antisemitic and an "offensive rant". He was accused of comparing Israel's treatment of Palestinians to the Holocaust by saying "just because you observe the niceties of Holocaust Memorial Day, it does not mean you have learned the lessons of history". Ali described the accusation as a "gross fabrication", telling the Evening Standard that it was "designed to stifle legitimate criticism of the Israeli government". The claims against Ali were also reported in The Jewish Chronicle and in October 2020, IPSO upheld a complaint against The Jewish Chronicle as the publication did not make clear that "compared one of Israel’s 2009 offensive on Gaza to the Shoah" was their characterisation of Ali's comments rather than a factual description of them and that they had falsely stated Ali had made the remarks on Holocaust Memorial Day.

The Jewish Chronicle also quoted the Green Party as saying it had been advised "informally" about Ali's speech in 2009 but that its processes for dealing with this at the time had been "inadequate". The party later clarified that no formal complaint of antisemitism was ever received and condemned "the way in which the statements provided were used to fuel further stories and negative comment".

=== Leadership campaigns (2018–2021) ===
On 29 June 2018, Ali announced he would stand in the 2018 Green Party of England and Wales leadership election. He was considered the main challenger to the co-leadership ticket of Jonathan Bartley and Siân Berry. Bartley and Berry won with 6,239 votes, whilst Ali came in second place with 1,466 votes and 17.5% of the vote.

In September 2018, Ali called for an investigation into the suspension of a member who was suspended for saying that allowing trans children to transition was child abuse. In October of the same year, he spoke at the Green Party's conference to oppose adoption of the Working Definition of Antisemitism. In 2019, Ali was a list candidate for the 2019 European Parliament election. In June 2020, Ali announced his candidacy in the 2020 Green Party of England and Wales leadership election. In September 2020, it was announced that Ali had lost the election to incumbent co-leaders Siân Berry and Jonathan Bartley. Ali published a statement during his 2020 leadership campaign titled "What is a Woman?", which stated "A woman is commonly defined as an adult human female and, genetically, typified by two XX chromosomes. These facts are not in dispute nor should they be in any political party." This was criticised by Benali Hamdache as excluding both trans women and intersex women from womanhood. Ali came third in the election, receiving 23.6% of the vote.

In February 2021, Ali proposed a motion opposing the Working Definition of Antisemitism, which he called "counterproductive on its own terms and inimical to free speech on the Israel-Palestine conflict". He was a list candidate for the party in the 2021 London Assembly election and unsuccessfully sought the party's nomination for the 2021 London mayoral election. In June 2021, Ali was appointed as the Green Party's spokesperson for policing and domestic safety. His appointment was seen as controversial in the party due to previous allegations against him of transphobia. A member of one of the party's policy working groups resigned due to Ali's appointment. Green Party members, according to PoliticsHome, said this was the main reason for Siân Berry's July 2021 decision not to stand in the next party leader election. In her statement, Berry cited unspecified spokesperson appointments as being inconsistent with her pledge to support trans equality. In July, the Young Greens of England and Wales passed a motion calling for Ali's appointment to be ended.

In August 2021, Ali announced his candidacy in the 2021 Green Party of England and Wales leadership election. He came third and was eliminated in the first round after receiving 21.0% of the vote.

=== Unlawful discrimination claim against the Green Party ===
In February 2022, Ali was removed from his position as the Green Party's spokesperson for policing and domestic safety. Liz Reason, chair of the Green Party's executive, announced on Twitter that "the Green Party Executive has removed Shahrar Ali from his role as party spokesperson for breaches of the Speakers' Code of Conduct." Ali took the party to court, claiming that his dismissal was due to discrimination against his gender-critical beliefs.

On 9 February 2024, the Judge ruled that the Green Party had subjected Shahrar Ali to "unlawful discrimination" on grounds of his gender critical belief and he was awarded damages of £9,100 for injury to feelings. (Hellman, 262) The court decided that his dismissal was "procedurally unfair" and a "one-off instance of discrimination" on the ground of his protected belief (i.e. gender-critical belief) and that all other claims including allegations of discrimination and victimisation were dismissed.

Dr Ali's core complaint was that his removal as spokesperson discriminated against him on the ground of his protected belief. I agree, but on the narrow ground that GPEx discriminated against him by removing him as spokesperson in a way that was procedurally unfair.
Dr Ali's remaining allegations of discrimination are dismissed. [...]
A number of allegations are time-barred. I am satisfied that it would not be just and equitable to extend the time for bringing them, but if I had extended time, I would have dismissed them on the merits.
The claim of victimisation is dismissed [...]
I also grant a declaration that he has been subject to unlawful discrimination

— His Honour Judge Hellman

The judge observed that political parties have the right to remove spokespeople if they advocate views which are different from party policy, but they must do so fairly.

In September 2024, the Green Party was ordered to pay £90,000 to Ali, representing 60% of his legal costs in bringing the case.

== Elections contested ==
=== Public office ===
==== European Parliament ====
Date	Constituency	List position	List votes	% votes
2004	London	7th	158,986	8.4
2009	London	3rd	190,589	10.9
2014	London	4th	196,419	8.9
2019	London	3rd	278,957	12.4

==== House of Commons ====
Date	Constituency	Votes	% votes	Place
2005	Brent East	905	2.9	4th
2010	Brent Central	668	1.5	4th
2015	Brent Central	1,912	4.1	4th
2019	Bethnal Green and Bow	2,570	4.2	4th

==== London Assembly (constituency) ====
Date	Constituency	Votes	% votes	Place
2008	Brent and Harrow	10,129	6.4	4th
2012	Brent and Harrow	10,546	7.3	4th

==== London Assembly (list) ====
Date	List position	List votes	% votes
2008	7th	203,465	8.3
2012	5th	182,215	8.5
2016	3rd	207,959	8.0
2021	5th	305,452	11.8
2024	10th	286,746	11.6

==== Council ====
Date	Council	Ward	Votes	Place
2005 by-election	Brent London Borough Council	Preston	86	4th
2006	Camden London Borough Council	Bloomsbury	329	9th
2006	Brent London Borough Council	Queens Park	462	10th
2007 by-election	Brent London Borough Council	Dudden Hill	156	5th
2008 by-election	Brent London Borough Council	Queens Park	239	4th
2010	Brent London Borough Council	Welsh Harp	430	10th
2014	Brent London Borough Council	Willesden Green	520	7th
2022	Tower Hamlets London Borough Council	Whitechapel	352	11th

=== Green Party ===
==== Leader ====
Date	Votes	% votes	Place
2018	1,466	16.5	2nd
2020	1,735	23.6	3rd
2021	2,422	21.0	3rd

==== Deputy leader ====
Date	Votes	% votes	Place
2014	1,314	Unknown	Elected
2016	1,716	21.1	3rd
2022	Unknown	24	3rd

Party political offices
Preceded by Will Duckworth	Deputy Leader of the Green Party of England and Wales; 2014–2016; With: Amelia Womack	Succeeded by Amelia Womack
