= The Mustangs =

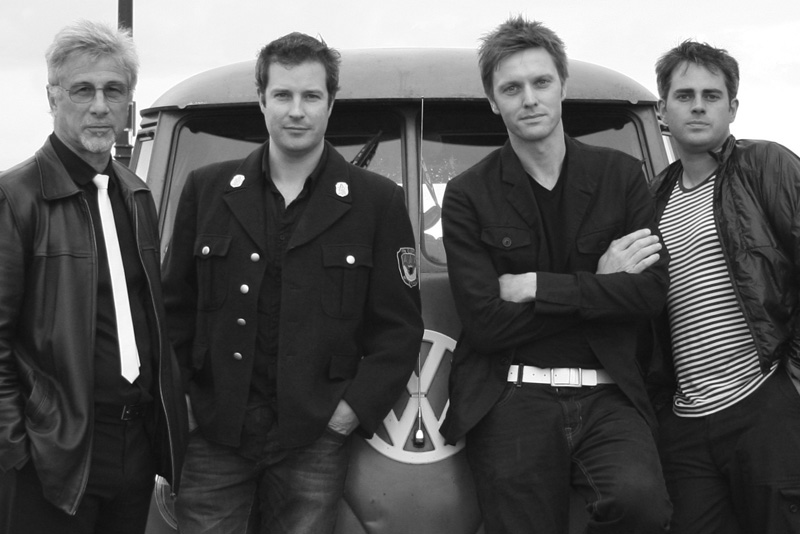

Background information
- Origin: South East England
- Genres: Blues, rock, R&B
- Years active: 2001–present
- Label: Skyfire Records
- Members: Adam Norsworthy (lead guitar, vocals); Derek Kingaby (blues harp); Jonathan Bartley (drums, backing vocals); Ben McKeown (bass guitar, backing vocals)
- Website: http://www.themustangsband.co.uk/

The Mustangs are a British blues rock band that was formed in Hampshire in 2001. Signed to the Skyfire Records label, they have released 11 albums, including Split Decision, which reached number 5 on the iTunes blues chart. They are unusual on the blues rock circuit as their albums are made of entirely original material. The Mustangs were nominated for Best Band at the 2010 British Blues Awards. The band's drummer, Jonathan Bartley, is a former co-leader of The Green Party of England and Wales. They are regarded as one of the most long-running and established bands on the UK blues rock circuit.

== Details ==
The Mustangs were formed by Adam Norsworthy and Derek Kingaby after an impromptu jam session in the Fountain Pub in Rowland's Castle, Hampshire, in 2001. The Mustangs first came to national attention after winning the Eel Pie Club's Search for New Blues Talent competition in 2004.

The Mustangs have played and headlined a wide variety of gigs and blues festivals across the UK and Europe including Glastonbury Festival, Colne, Maryport, Blues on The Farm, Newark, Swanage, Skegness, Hyde Park, Goodwood, Zinc Paris, Gosport and Southsea. Their concerts showcase singer Norsworthy's dynamic energy: he runs and jumps about the stage throughout each concert, whilst maintaining a visible camaraderie with the other band members. Musician magazine has called them "compulsory for British blues rock fans". Record Collector magazine wrote of their "musical depth, sheer balls and plenty of heart and soul".

As well as their own material, in concert the group often plays some blues standards, though radically reinterpreting the arrangement to suit the band's "truly storming... ferocious" sound. These include Lead Belly's "Hands Off", Troyce Keane's "Annie Maybe" and Cyril Davies "Countryline Special".

Chiefly influenced by the British blues rock bands of the 1960s, such as Led Zeppelin and Fleetwood Mac, as well as Dr. Feelgood, the Mustangs also draw on more traditional blues influences such as Muddy Waters, Elmore James and Robert Johnson. The band's use of blues harp, played by Derek Kingaby, adds to an authentic, traditional blues sound. In recent years the band has expanded into folk, country and even progressive rock in its songwriting.

The band's nine studio albums to date have been well received. Blues In Britain magazine selected Nothing Stays the Same as one of its 20 albums of the year. Blues Matters magazine said of the same record, "This outfit has the potential to change how British blues is perceived and received." Rock'n'Reel magazine called Split Decision "the very definition of blues rock".

The majority of the songwriting is by Norsworthy, but all four members of the band have contributed songs to the albums.

The band's fifth album, Cut Loose, received a 5 star review in the May 2010 issue of R2 magazine, with reviewer Brian Smith commenting, "Cut Loose is a real treat...it drips with musicianship..it is infectiously funky...and downright beautiful." In the same year, as well as being nominated for best band at the British Blues Awards, Ben Mckeown and Jon Bartley were nominated for an award in their own instrument categories, Mckeown for Best Bass Guitarist and Bartley for Best Drummer.

The band's sixth album, Shaman & the Monkey, was released in October 2011. Blues in Britain said "the album continues the Mustangs’ way with a catchy tune, first class musicianship and production values, and is worth adding to any serious blues/rock music collection." The band supported the release with a number of shows at high profile blues festivals across the UK including Maryport, Cambridge, Swanage, Newark and the Isle of Wight. The Mustangs left Cross Border later in 2011 and signed to the Trapeze Music label, who subsequently took over the release of the Shaman & the Monkey album, as well taking over the distribution of the band's entire back catalogue.

In December 2012, Shaman & the Monkey was voted Best UK and European blues rock album by the prestigious Blues Underground Network A new song, "Highwire", from Shaman & the Monkey, was nominated as Best Original Blues Song at the 2012 British Blues Awards. This was the band's fourth ever nomination at the Awards.

The band's seventh album, Speed of Love, was released on 8 April 2013. A single, "Yours Sincerely", was released with an accompanying video and reached number 2 on the UK Blues Chart on 23 April. In August 2014, the group's first live album, One Night In The West, was released. It was recorded at the Swanage Blues Festival in 2013.

On 5 August 2016 The band release an 18-track 'Best Of' compilation. The songs were taken from the band's eight albums, and were all selected by the band members. The album features re-recordings of "Double Headed Romeo" and "Can't Find A Lover".

In September 2016, drummer Jonathan Bartley, a long-time political activist, was announced as the joint-leader of The Green Party of England and Wales alongside MP Caroline Lucas. The pair won an 85% majority in the Party's leadership election.

In December 2016, the band released their eighth studio album, Just Passing Through. An early review from Firebrand magazine called it "an eclectic masterpiece". It was named as one of the Albums Of The Year by the music website Fabrications HQ. In Autumn 2017, the band left Trapeze Music and joined Skyfire Records. Their first album for Skyfire was Watertown, released on 7 June 2019. It is an ecologically-themed concept album about industrialisation and pollution. An early review from Frame Music Magazine gave it 10/10 and called it "a wonderful album".

On some social media the band refers to itself as The Mustangs (UK) to differentiate itself from a handful of other bands across the world with the same name.

== Discography ==
Title	Year	Label
Let It Roll	2003	Raging Horse BMMCD0203
Rocking Horse	2004	Raging Horse RHR0804
Split Decision	2006	Blues Matters BMRCD20062
Nothing Stays The Same	2008	Blues Matters BMRCD20081
Cut Loose	2010	Cross Border CBR0209 / Blues Matters – BMRCD20091
Shaman & the Monkey	2011	Trapeze Music CBR0711
Speed of Love	2013	Trapeze Music TRACD6510
One Night In The West (Live)	2014	Trapeze Music TRMCD8501
The Best of the Mustangs 2001-2016	2016	Trapeze Music TRACD6516
Just Passing Through	2017	Trapeze Music TRACD6517
Watertown	2019	Skyfire Records

== Side projects ==
Adam Norsworthy has released five solo albums whilst in the Mustangs. In September 2014, he released Love & Wine, on the Trapeze Music label. A video for the song "Coming Back To You (To Say Goodbye)" was made to support the album. Norsworthy played all the instruments and produced the albums. In May 2016 he released Rainbird, which was co-produced by Wayne Proctor, the drummer from King King. The album also featured guests slots from King King hammond organ player Bob Fridzema, and Nimmo Brothers bassist Matt Beable, as well as violin from Vittorio's Anna Brigham. The album received critical acclaim and two songs were released as singles, "Shores of Heaven" and "Da Vinci's Eyes". In 2018 his third solo album, The Circus Moon, was released on Skyfire Records, with a number of videos made to support singles from the album. Frame Magazine called the record 'Truly Awesome'. In 2022 he released "Infinite Hotel" and in January 2023 "Talking Pictures". Both were released to wide critical acclaim.

In 2012, as Adam & the King Bee, Norsworthy and Derek Kingaby released Pow Wow, a collection of blues- and country-tinged songs that they had written while rooming together on tour with the Mustangs.

In 2015, Norsworthy formed the blues band The Milk Men as a side project, with school friend Jamie Smy and bassist Lloyd Green, son of Mick Green and drummer Mike Roberts from Johnny Kidd & The Pirates. Their debut album, Full Phat, was released by Skyfire Records in 2017. The follow-up, Gold Top, reached number 2 on the iTunes Blues chart. The band's third album, Deliverance, reached number 9 on the Amazon national album chart in 2020. In 2023 The Milk Men released Spin The Bottle and headlined a number of major blues festivals throughout the UK.
