= 2018 Green Party of England and Wales leadership election =

- 1 June – 31 August 2018
- Turnout: 8,379 (24.0%) ▼5.8 pp
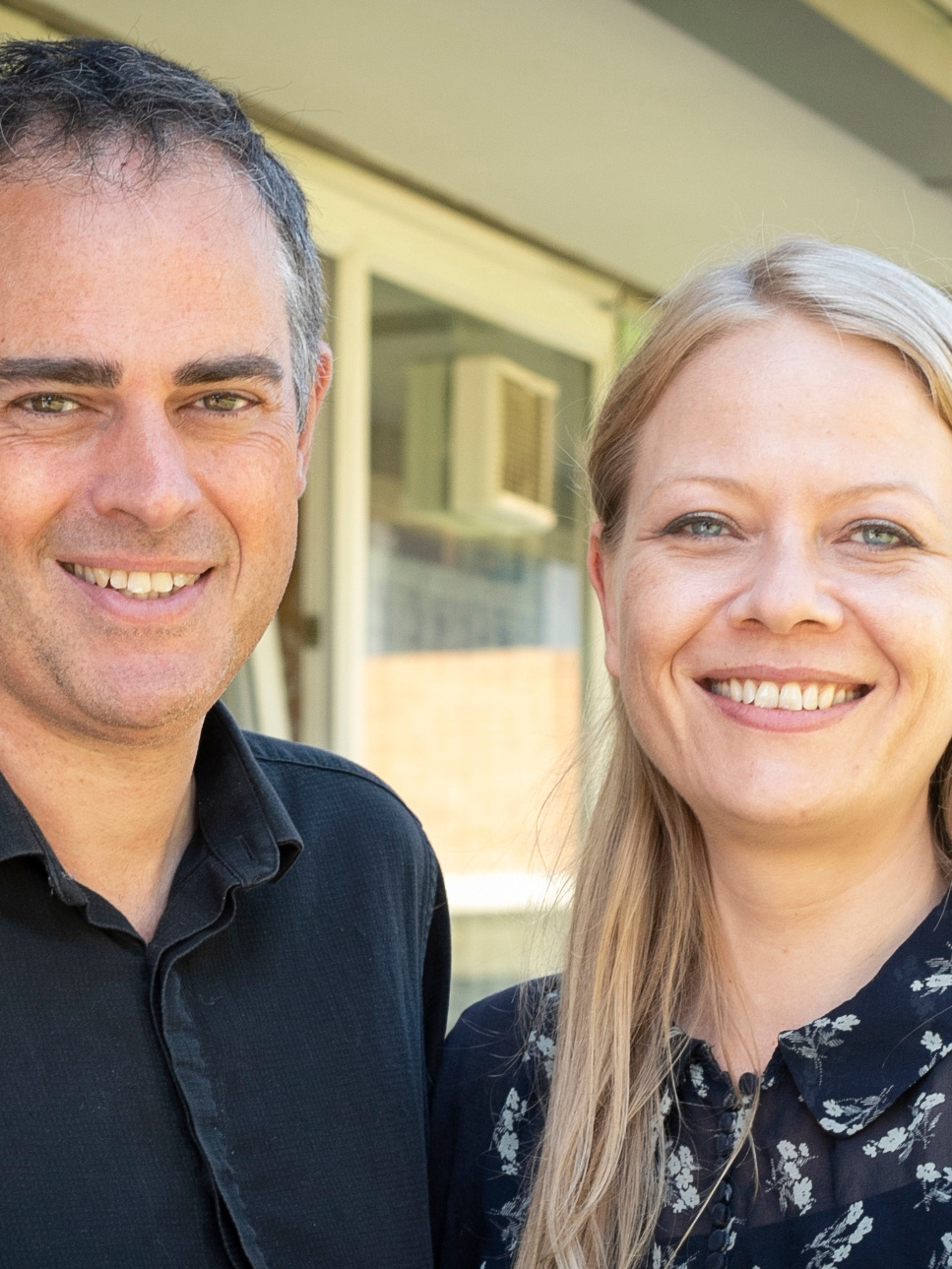

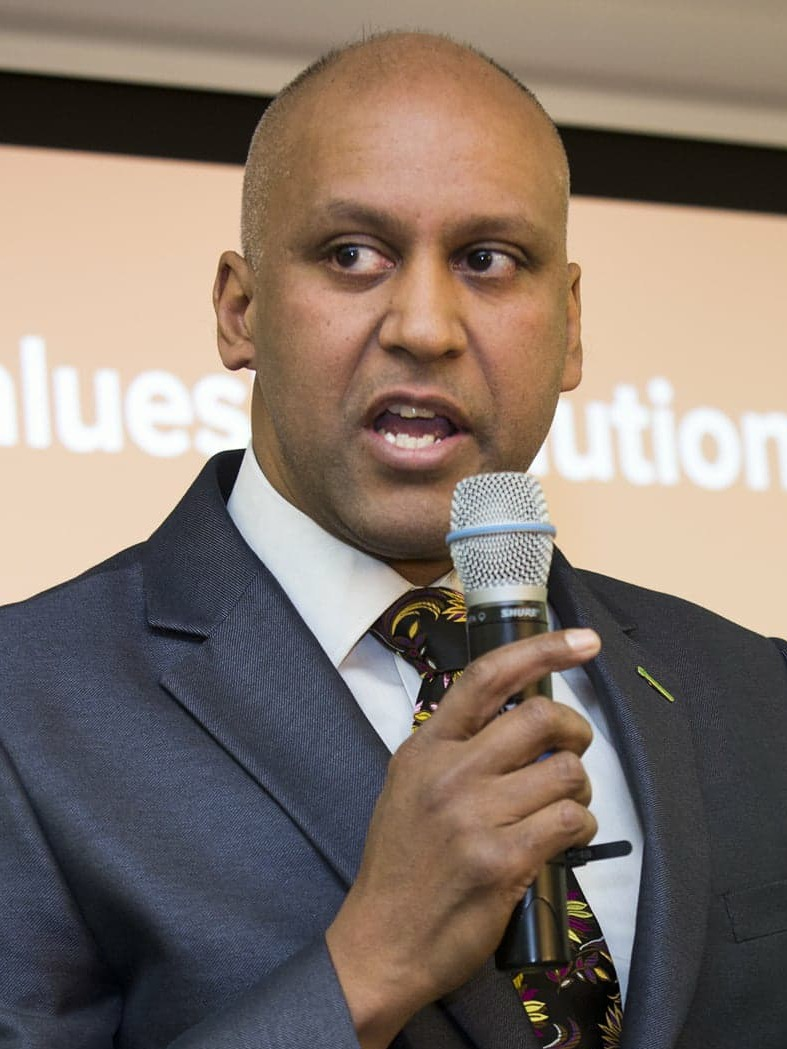

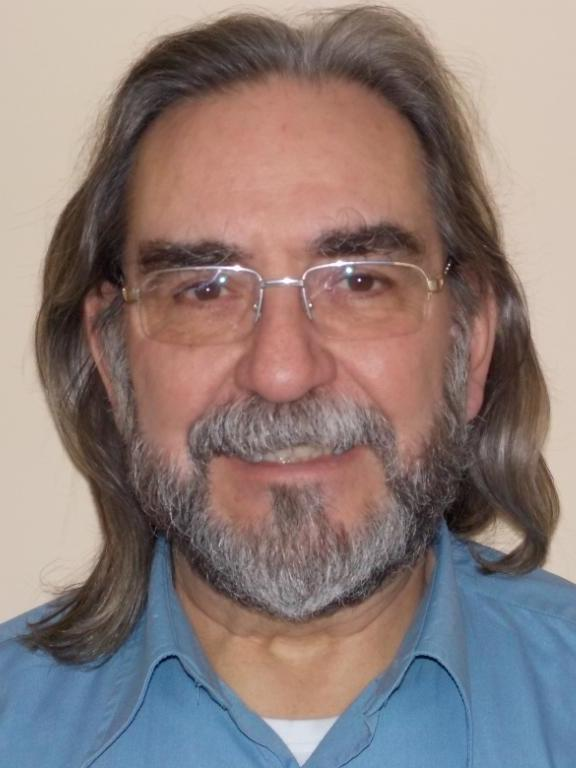
Candidate	Jonathan Bartley and Siân Berry	Shahrar Ali	Leslie Rowe
Popular vote	6,329	1,466	495
Percentage	75.5%	17.5%	5.9%
Leaders before election
Jonathan Bartley &
Caroline Lucas
Elected Leaders
Jonathan Bartley &
Siân Berry

The 2018 Green Party of England and Wales leadership election was held from June to August 2018 to select a leader of the Green Party of England and Wales. Caroline Lucas and Jonathan Bartley had been elected as co-leaders in 2016. Lucas stood down, whilst Bartley stood for re-election with a new co-leadership candidate, Siân Berry. They won re-election in the first round, and Amelia Womack won re-election as the party's deputy leader.

The leadership election for the Green Party of England and Wales is held routinely every two years. The 2018 election, which ran from 1 June to 31 August, was the sixth since the party decided to have a leader (or two co-leaders) and a deputy leader. The result was declared on 4 September: Jonathan Bartley and Siân Berry were elected as co-leaders and Amelia Womack was re-elected as deputy leader.

== Background ==
Prior to 2008, the Green Party elected spokespeople called principal speakers instead of leaders. After a rule change, the party adopted a system of electing a leader or co-leaders every two years. If there are two co-leaders, a single deputy will be elected whereas if there is a single leader there are two deputies. In either case, the election is subject to the party's gender-balancing rules. The party's first leader, elected in 2008, was Caroline Lucas, at the time a Member of the European Parliament but later the party's only Member of Parliament. She held the position for two terms before standing down. The journalist Natalie Bennett won two terms as leader before standing down. Lucas then stood for re-election on a joint platform with Jonathan Bartley in 2016, winning election. On 30 May 2018, Lucas announced that she would stand down and not seek re-election. On the next day, Bartley announced he was running for re-election with Siân Berry, a former principal speaker of the party and the leader of the party's London Assembly group.

The party's deputy leader Amelia Womack announced she was running for re-election on 7 June.

== Timetable ==
Nominations opened on 1 June and closed on 29 June. Voting was from 30 June to 31 August. Seven hustings were arranged for leadership and deputy leadership candidates – on 14 July in Birmingham, on 21 July in York and Manchester, on 28 July in London, Cambridge and Bristol, and on 4 August in Chepstow. The election result was declared on 4 September.

== Candidates ==
=== Leadership ===
Candidate		Political office	
Shahrar Ali		Deputy leader (2014–2016)	
Jonathan Bartley	Siân Berry	Co-leader (2016–2021)	Member of the London Assembly (2016–present); Principal speaker of the Green Party (2006–2007)
Leslie Rowe			

=== Deputy leadership candidates ===
Candidate	Political office
Jonathan Chilvers	Warwickshire County Councillor (2013–present)
Andrew Cooper	Energy spokesperson Kirklees Councillor (1999–present)
Rashid Nix	
Amelia Womack	Deputy leader (2014–2022); Culture, media and sport spokesperson

=== Rejected and withdrawn ===
Tim Young's application to be a leadership candidate was rejected as he had insufficient nominations. Aimee Challenor withdrew her candidacy after voting had begun after her father and election agent was convicted of child sexual abuse.

== Leadership campaign ==
Berry said that, if elected, she would continue as a councillor in Highgate and as a London Assembly member. Oliver Lewis, a Labour Party councillor for the same ward as Berry, said, "She [Siân] must have known this was coming. They had a leadership website ready to go." Bartley and Berry released a detailed plan for their leadership on their website, promising a renewed focus on non-violent direct action, expanding election training to train the next generation of Green leaders, and to prepare the party for greater electoral success. Berry said that she would not be interested in standing for Parliament, if elected Co-Leader, but would use her increased profile to compete again for the London mayoralty.

On 11 August 2018, The Times reported that on Holocaust Memorial Day, in January 2009, Shahrar Ali had made a speech comparing Israel's treatment of Palestinians to the Holocaust. In an article published on the Left Foot Forward blog, the Campaign Against Antisemitism described his speech as anti-semitic and an "offensive rant". Ali described the accusation as a "gross fabrication", telling the Evening Standard that it was "designed to stifle legitimate criticism of the Israeli government". The Green Party said that its initial handling of reports about Ali's speech in 2009 were inadequate and that it is seeking to revise procedures. The Green Party later clarified that no formal complaint of anti-semitism against Ali had been received.

== Result ==
=== Leader ===
Candidate	Votes	%
Jonathan Bartley and Siân Berry	6,329	75.5%
Shahrar Ali	1,466	17.5%
Leslie Rowe	495	5.9%
Re-open nominations	89	1.1%
Turnout	8,379	24.0%

=== Deputy leader ===
Candidate	Votes	%
Amelia Womack	3,981	54.3%
Andrew Cooper	1,836	25.0%
Rashid Nix	1,062	14.5%
Jonathan Chilvers	438	6.0%
Re-open nominations	18	0.3%
Turnout	7,335	21.0%
