= 2014 Green Party of England and Wales leadership election =

British party leadership election

- 7 September 2014
- Turnout: 3,279 (25.5%) ▲0.4 pp
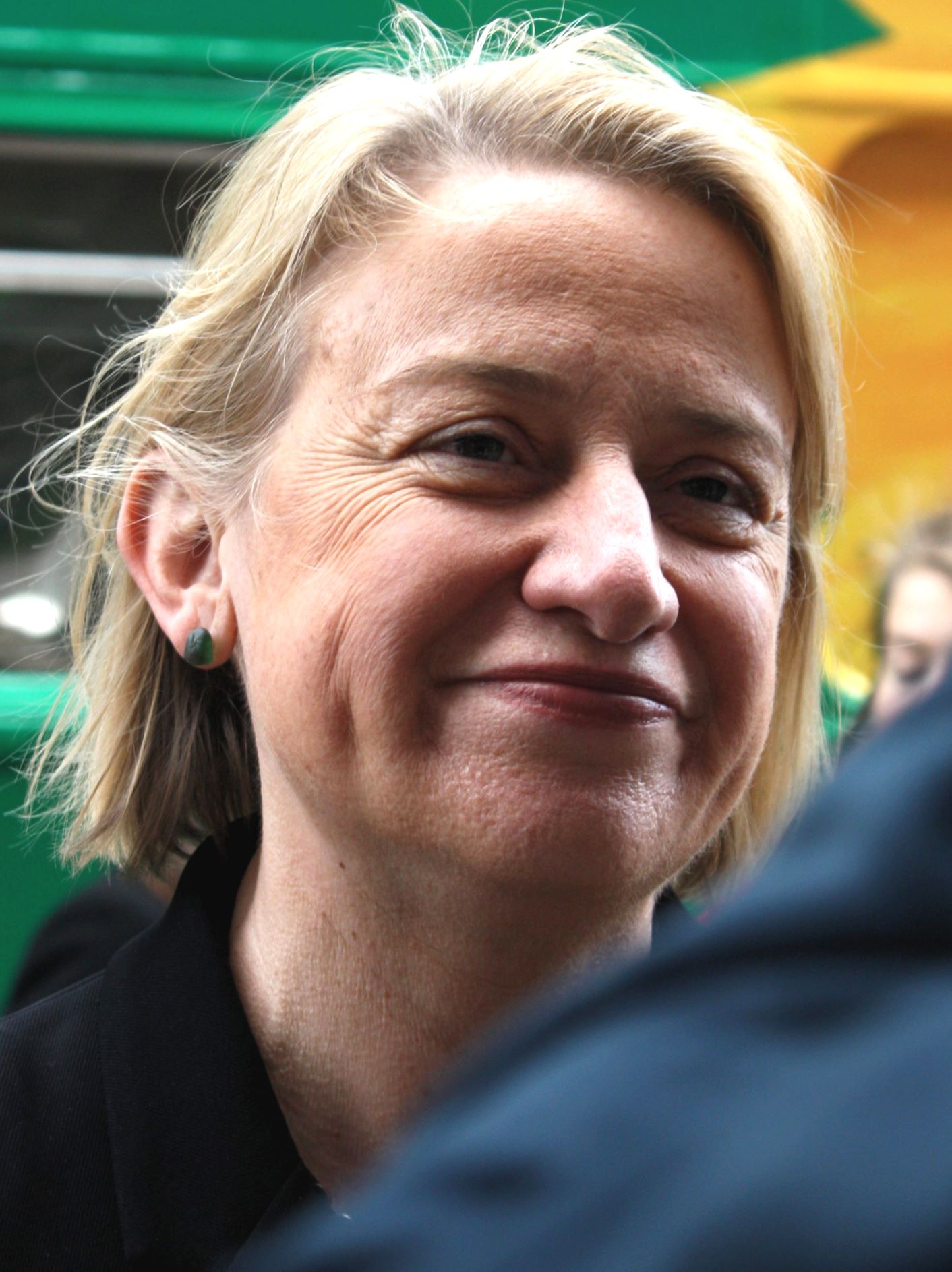
Candidate	Natalie Bennett
Popular vote	2,618
Percentage	93.5%
Leader before election
Natalie Bennett
Elected Leader
Natalie Bennett

The 2014 Green Party of England and Wales leadership election took place in September 2014 to determine the leader of the Green Party of England and Wales. It was won unopposed by the incumbent leader, Natalie Bennett.

At the same time, Amelia Womack and Shahrar Ali were elected as co-deputy leaders.

== Background ==
Prior to 2008, the party had used a system of principal speakers instead of leaders. Following an internal vote in 2007, the party elected individual leaders. Caroline Lucas, who had previously been elected as principal speaker, was chosen in 2008 as the first leader of the Green Party. She was re-elected in 2010, and stood down in 2012, when Natalie Bennett was elected as the second leader of the party.

Initially, the party's gender balancing system meant that the deputy leader needed to be a different gender to the leader. Prior to the 2014 election, the system was changed so that two deputy leaders would be elected who would need to be of different genders.

== Candidates ==
=== Leadership candidates ===
Candidate	Political office
Natalie Bennett	Leader (2012–2016)

=== Deputy leadership candidates ===
Candidate	Biography
Shahrar Ali	Academic
Will Duckworth	Deputy leader (2012–); Dudley Borough Councillor (2012–)
Mark Ereira-Guyer	Suffolk County Councillor for Tower (2009–)
Rob Telford	
Amelia Womack	Activist

== Results ==
=== Leader ===
Candidate	Votes	%
Natalie Bennett	2,618	93.5%
Re-open nominations	183	6.5%
Turnout	2,801	15.1%

=== Deputy leader ===
Unlike in other years, the Green Party did not publish the full breakdown of the deputy leadership election. Two deputy leaders were to be elected, required to be of different genders.

Amelia Womack was elected in the first round with 1,598 votes. Will Duckworth, the sitting deputy leader, came second in the first round with 1,108. However, after votes were redistributed, Shahrar Ali was elected in the second round, beating Duckworth by 1,314 votes to 1,277.
