= 2020 Green Party of England and Wales leadership election =

- 3 – 31 August 2020
- Turnout: 7,358 (15.4%) ▼8.6 pp
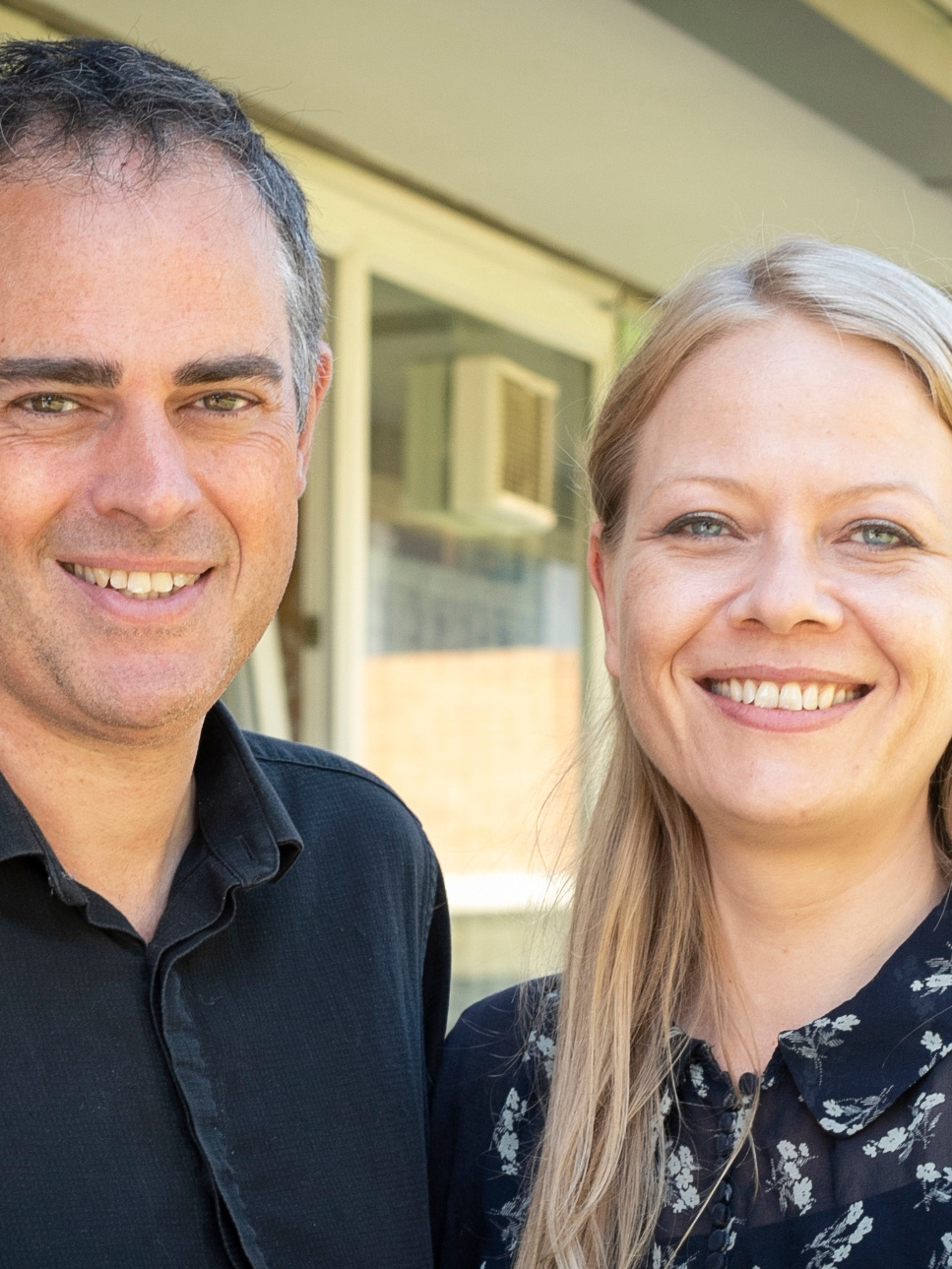

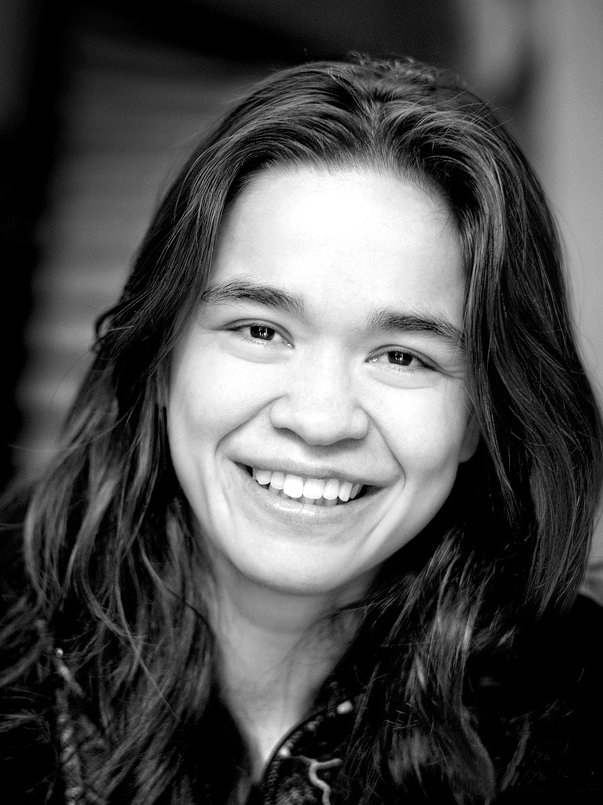

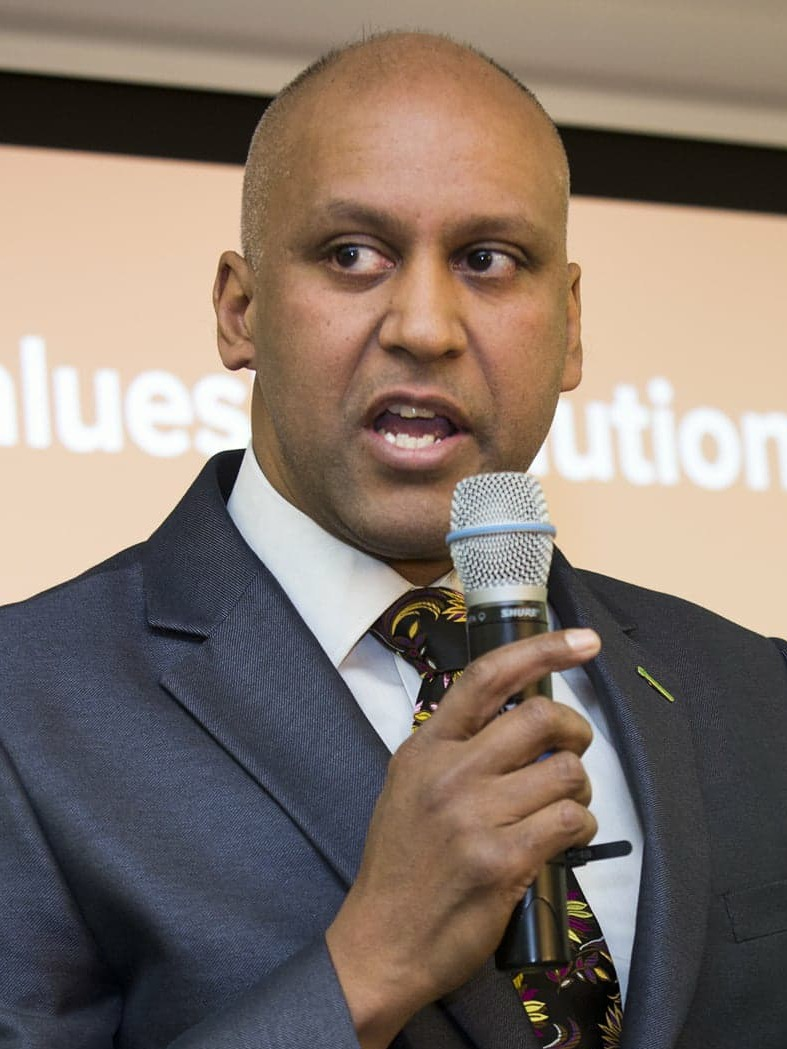
Candidate	Jonathan Bartley and Siân Berry	Rosi Sexton	Shahrar Ali
First pref.	3,600 (48.9%)	1,978 (26.9%)	1,735 (23.6%)
Final round	4,238 (61.8%)	2,618 (38.2%)	Eliminated
Leaders before election
Jonathan Bartley
& Siân Berry
Elected Leaders
Jonathan Bartley
& Siân Berry

The 2020 Green Party of England and Wales leadership election took place in August 2020 to determine the leader of the Green Party of England and Wales, while an election for the party's deputy leader also took place simultaneously. Jonathan Bartley and Siân Berry, who were elected on a joint ticket in 2018, were re-elected as co-leaders while Amelia Womack was re-elected as the party's deputy leader.

== Background ==
Prior to 2008, the Green Party elected spokespeople called principal speakers instead of leaders. After a rule change, the party adopted a system of electing a leader or co-leaders every two years. If there are two co-leaders, a single deputy will be elected whereas if there is a single leader there are two deputies. In either case, the election is subject to the party's gender-balancing rules. The election was held under the instant-runoff voting electoral system, with voters able to select different preferences for each candidate.

== Campaign ==
=== Leadership ===
The incumbent co-leaders, Jonathan Bartley and Siân Berry, stood for re-election. Bartley was a Lambeth councillor and Berry was a London Assembly Member and the party's candidate for the 2021 London mayoral election.

Shahrar Ali, the party's home affairs spokesperson who had been one of the party's deputy leaders from 2014 to 2016, ran for the leadership. He had previously run against Bartley and Berry in 2018.

One of the party's councillors in Solihull, the mixed martial artist Rosi Sexton, campaigned for the leadership as an "outsider". She said she wanted to focus on the party's electoral strategy and policy development processes.

=== Deputy leadership ===
Amelia Womack was first elected as the party's deputy leader in 2014 and was re-elected in each subsequent election.

Cleo Lake, a Bristol councillor for the party since 2016, contested the deputy leadership election saying she wanted to inspire more activists into politics. The writer and campaigner Tom Pashy, Nick Humberstone, and Andrea Carey Fuller also sought election as deputy leader.

== Timeline ==
=== June ===
- 1 June: Nominations open at 10am
- 30 June: Nominations close at 12pm

=== August ===
- 3 August: Online voting opens at 10am
- 31 August: Online voting closes at 10pm

=== September ===
- 9 September: Results announced

== Candidates ==
=== Leader ===
Candidate		Political office		Announced
Shahrar Ali		Home affairs spokesperson Deputy leader (2014–2016)		30 June
Jonathan Bartley	Siân Berry	Co-leader (2016–2021); Lambeth Councillor (2018–present)	Co-leader (2018–2021); Member of the London Assembly (2016–present); Camden Councillor (2014–present); Principal speaker of the Green Party (2006–2007)	8 June
Rosi Sexton		Solihull Councillor (2019–present)		28 June

=== Deputy leader ===
Candidate	Experience	Announced
Andrea Carey Fuller	Activist	1 July
Nick Humberstone	Young Greens committee member	10 June
Cleo Lake	Bristol City Councillor (2016–present)	26 June
Tom Pashby	Engineer	29 June
Amelia Womack	Deputy leader (2014–2022)	17 June

=== Declined and withdrawn ===
The former MEPs Alex Phillips and Magid Magid were speculated as potential leadership candidates but chose not to run. The former Parliamentary candidate James Booth initially stood as a deputy leadership candidate, but withdrew.

== Results ==
=== Leader ===
Jonathan Bartley and Siân Berry were re-elected as co-leaders in the second round.

Candidate	First round		Second round	
Candidate	Votes	%	Votes	%
Jonathan Bartley and Siân Berry	3,600	48.9%	4,238	61.8%
Rosi Sexton	1,978	26.9%	2,618	38.2%
Shahrar Ali	1,735	23.6%	Eliminated	
Re-open nominations	45	0.6%	Eliminated	
Turnout	7,358	15.4%		

=== Deputy leader ===
Amelia Womack was re-elected as deputy leader in the second round.

Candidate	First round		Second round	
Candidate	Votes	%	Votes	%
Amelia Womack	3,006	46.5%	3,416	55.2%
Cleo Lake	2,153	33.3%	2,777	44.8%
Andrea Carey Fuller	684	10.6%	Eliminated	
Tom Pashby	309	4.8%	Eliminated	
Nick Humberstone	282	4.3%	Eliminated	
Re-open nominations	25	0.4%	Eliminated	
Turnout	6,459	13.0%		

== Aftermath ==
The turnout was the lowest for one of the party's leadership elections since Natalie Bennett's unopposed re-election in 2014. The re-elected co-leaders, Bartley and Berry, said they wanted to make gains in the upcoming 2021 United Kingdom local elections and promised to make the party the "main opposition" to the Conservative government.
