= Will Duckworth =

Former Deputy Leader of the Green Party of England and Wales

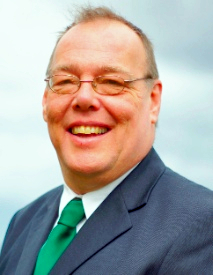

Deputy Leader of the Green Party of England and Wales
- In office 3 September 2012 – 1 September 2014
- Leader: Natalie Bennett
- Preceded by: Adrian Ramsay
- Succeeded by: Amelia Womack; Shahrar Ali

Dudley Borough Councillor for Netherton, Woodside & St. Andrew's Ward
- In office 3 May 2012 – 7 May 2015
- Preceded by: John Davies
- Succeeded by: Qadar Zada

Personal details
- Born: 20 January 1954 (age 72) Dudley, Worcestershire, England
- Party: Green Party of England and Wales (until 2019)

Will Duckworth (born 20 January 1954) is a former British politician who served as Deputy Leader of the Green Party of England and Wales from 2012 to 2014. He was the first Green Party councillor in the Black Country after serving on the Dudley Borough Council in the West Midlands from 2012 to 2015.

He was elected as the party's second ever deputy leader on 3 September 2012 taking over from Adrian Ramsay. In September 2014, he lost the deputy leadership election with Amelia Womack and Shahrar Ali both becoming his successors. He was also the West Midlands regional Green Party first choice candidate on the list for the 2014 European Parliament election.

== Political career ==
Described by Derek Wall as "a true working class Black Country lad", Duckworth joined the Green Party shortly before becoming a founder of the Dudley Greens in 2009. He became regional treasurer for the party, and stood unsuccessfully in Stourbridge at the 2010 general election.

Duckworth first stood for the Greens in the Netherton, Woodside & St. Andrew's ward in Dudley in 2010, coming last (5th) receiving 168 votes (2.8%). He stood again the following year after campaigning in the ward and received a much improved result coming second with 1,068 votes (28.0%). In 2012 he was elected with 1,525 votes (44.9%) taking the seat from the Conservative Party. Duckworth claims he had completed over a thousand pieces of casework helping out local residents in the two years running up to the 2012 election.

Duckworth stood for Deputy Leader in the 2012 Green Party of England and Wales leadership election, on a joint platform with Romayne Phoenix, who contested the party leadership. Although Phoenix was not elected, Duckworth beat Richard Mallender to become Deputy Leader.

In early August 2012 Duckworth was selected as the lead candidate in the Green Party list for the 2014 European Parliament election in the West Midlands region, where his party finished in fifth place out of ten, with 5.3% of the vote.

In September 2014, Duckworth stood for election to the position of Deputy Leader again, but was unsuccessful. Due to a change in the Green Party's constitution the previous year, two new Deputy Leaders, Amelia Womack and Shahrar Ali, were elected.

Will Duckworth stood down as councillor when his seat came up again for election on 7 May 2015.

In 2019, The Times reported that Duckworth had resigned his Green Party membership following accusations that the party had ignored allegations against him involving sexual misconduct with children.

== Personal life ==
Duckworth lived in Dudley with his wife Vicky.

Party political offices
Preceded by Adrian Ramsay	Deputy Leader of the Green Party of England and Wales; 2012–2014	Succeeded by Amelia Womack; Shahrar Ali
