= Jonathan Bartley =

British theologian and former co-leader of the Green Party of England and Wales

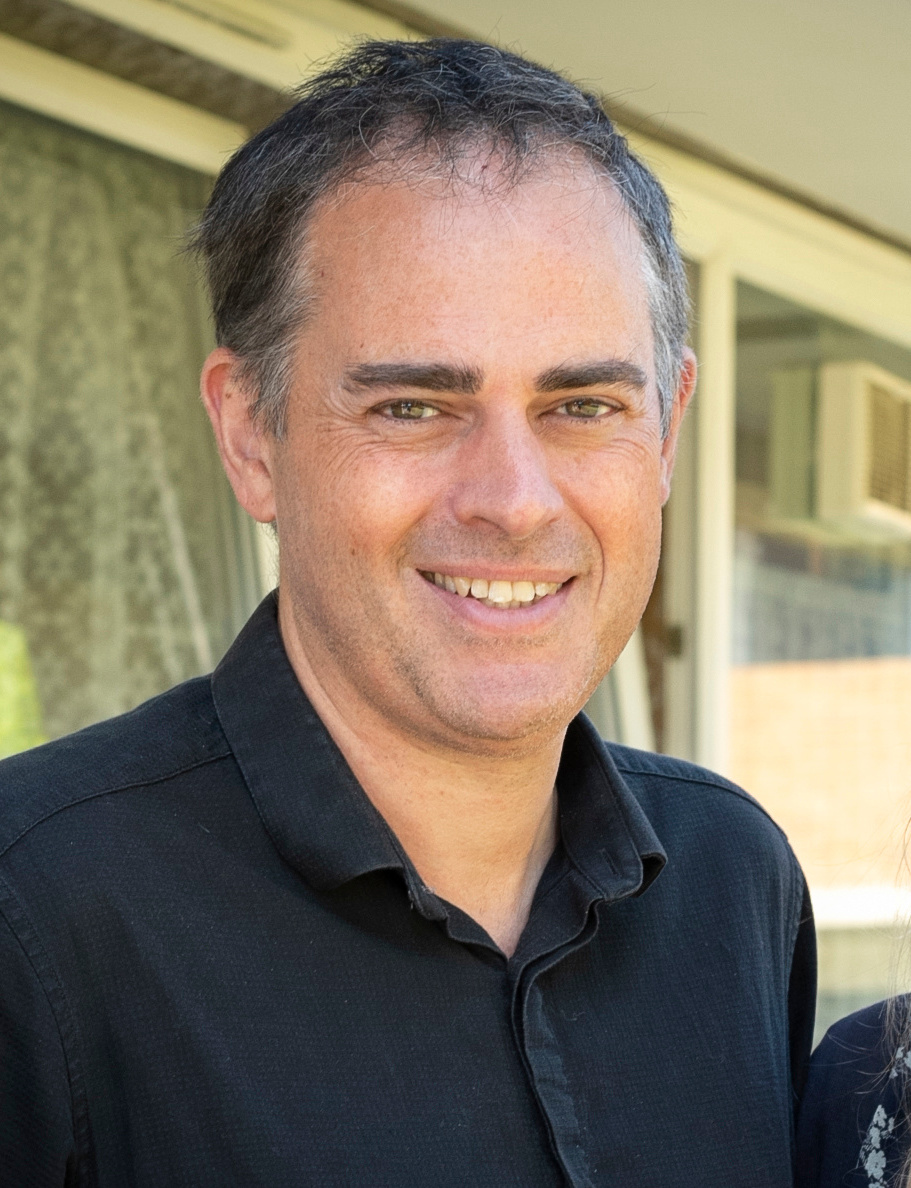
- Bartley in 2018

Co-Leader of the Green Party of England and Wales
- In office 2 September 2016 – 30 July 2021 Serving with: Caroline Lucas (2016–2018) Siân Berry (2018–2021)
- Deputy: Amelia Womack
- Preceded by: Natalie Bennett
- Succeeded by: Carla Denyer and Adrian Ramsay

Member of Lambeth London Borough Council for Clapham Town
- Incumbent
- Assumed office 11 May 2026
- Preceded by: David Robson (Labour)

Member of Lambeth London Borough Council for St Leonard's
- In office 3 May 2018 – 5 May 2022
- Preceded by: Rob Hill (Labour)

Personal details
- Born: Jonathan Charles Bartley; 16 October 1971 (age 55) London, England
- Party: Green Party of England and Wales (2010–present)
- Education: Dulwich College
- Alma mater: London School of Economics
- Occupation: Political activist

Jonathan Charles Bartley (born 16 October 1971) is a British politician who was a co-leader of the Green Party of England and Wales, a position he shared with Caroline Lucas from 2016 to 2018, and then with Siân Berry from 2018 to 2021. He was the Green Party's national Work and Pensions spokesperson and the party's Parliamentary candidate for Streatham in the 2015 general election. Under the Unite to Remain agreement with the Liberal Democrats, he stood as Green Party candidate for Dulwich and West Norwood at the 2019 general election. He took second place, achieving the biggest swing of the election.

Bartley was leader of the opposition and a councillor on Lambeth Council representing the St Leonard's ward in Streatham between 2018 and 2022. He became a councillor again, representing Clapham Town, in the May 2026 elections, and the following month was named Cabinet Member for Safer, Thriving Neighbourhoods.

Bartley is the founder and was (until 2016) co-director of Ekklesia, an independent think tank looking at the role of religion in public life and appears regularly on UK radio and television programmes. He is a member of the blues rock band The Mustangs, where he plays drums.

== Early life ==
Bartley was born in London on 16 October 1971. His father was Christopher Bartley, an NHS consultant physician, and Normandy veteran. Bartley's uncle was Anthony Bartley, a World War II Spitfire pilot and squadron leader who married the actress Deborah Kerr. Bartley is a direct descendant of the prison reformer Elizabeth Fry.

From 1980 to 1989, Bartley was educated at Dulwich College, a boarding independent school for boys, in Dulwich in south London. At the age of seventeen and while still at school, Bartley hit and killed a young student while driving a car, but the death was treated as accidental and the police did not press charges. After leaving school, Bartley attended the London School of Economics, from which he graduated with a degree in social policy.

== Politics ==
After graduating from the LSE, Bartley worked at the UK Parliament on a cross-party basis as a researcher and parliamentary assistant for a number of years. He volunteered on John Major's campaign team in the 1995 Conservative Party leadership election against John Redwood. He later said, "I was not an advisor, I was not a staffer and I am so far from the Conservatives you wouldn't believe."

In 2002, Bartley co-founded Ekklesia, a Christian think-tank which looks at "the changing role of beliefs, values and faith/non-faith in public life". In 2008, he co-founded the Accord Coalition, which works to end religious discrimination and segregation in the English and Welsh school systems.

He is a regular contributor to BBC One's The Big Questions. He has formerly contributed to BBC Radio 4's Thought for the Day and ITV's The Moral of the Story, and has been a columnist for The Church Times. He has been a guest on BBC Radio 4's The Moral Maze and has written for The Guardian newspaper.

=== David Cameron incident ===
On 27 April 2010, while Bartley was waiting to attend a hospital appointment at the Evelina Children's Hospital with his son Samuel, a Conservative Party official asked if he would like to meet the-then Leader of the Conservative Party, David Cameron. Bartley agreed, and party officials then brought the Conservative leader over to meet them, on his way to a car after a general election campaign event in south London.

Bartley asserted that Conservative manifesto plans would increase the segregation of disabled children, as it pledged to "end the bias towards the inclusion of children with special needs in mainstream schools". Referring to his own two-year attempt to gain a place for his son in a mainstream school, Bartley also asked why the Conservative manifesto did not say that the Conservatives wanted to encourage children into mainstream schools. Cameron said, "It absolutely does say that sir, I promise you". After the event, Channel 4 FactCheck said that Cameron had been wrong.

The Daily Telegraph pointed out that Bartley had been on The Moral Maze and was a regular commentator in the media. Bartley said he was a "floating voter", and that he felt let down by the main parties and criticised the Labour government over issues of inclusion.

Afterwards, Bartley became the chair of the Centre for Studies on Inclusive Education (CSIE).

=== AV referendum ===
As part of the Conservative–Liberal Democrat coalition agreement following the 2010 general election, the two parties agreed to an AV referendum on changing the method of electing MPs in subsequent general elections. A long-time supporter of electoral reform, Bartley was appointed a vice-chair of the official cross-party YES! To Fairer Votes campaign, acting principally as a media spokesperson throughout the referendum.

After the campaign, he joined the council of the Electoral Reform Society, serving as vice-chair.

=== Green Party ===
In 2012, Bartley was selected as the Green Party candidate for the Lambeth and Southwark constituency for the London Assembly elections, winning over 18,000 votes. Bartley also acted as the party's press officer for the London campaign.

In 2014, Bartley contested the St Leonard's ward on Lambeth Council as a Green candidate. He narrowly missed winning one of the three seats.

Bartley has represented the Green Party in the media, including the BBC's welfare debate at the 2015 general election, clashing with then-Work and Pensions Secretary Iain Duncan Smith. Bartley was the Green Party candidate for the London constituency of Streatham in the election, finishing fourth and receiving 4,421 votes (8.9%), an increase from the 1.8% the party received in 2010.

Bartley sought to be the party's candidate in the 2016 London mayoral election, but was defeated by Siân Berry. He was instead named in fourth place on the party's list of candidates for the concurrent London Assembly elections, and played an active role in the campaign.

On 31 May 2016, it was announced that Bartley would run for the position of the leader of the Green Party in a job share arrangement with the former leader Caroline Lucas in the forthcoming 2016 Green Party leadership election. He and Lucas subsequently became co-leaders on 2 September 2016. Bartley did not stand at the 2017 general election.

Bartley was also the Work and Pensions spokesperson for the Green Party from 2016 to 2017.

On 3 May 2018, Bartley was elected as a Green Party councillor for St Leonard's ward on Lambeth Council. He finished as the second placed Green candidate. Later that month he became leader of the Green group and opposition on the Council.

On 30 May 2018, Caroline Lucas announced she would not seek re-election as co-leader of the Green Party in the party's forthcoming leadership election. Bartley stood for election as co-leader with Siân Berry, and the two were successful.

On 16 October 2019, his 48th birthday, Bartley was arrested by police while demonstrating with Extinction Rebellion in Trafalgar Square.

Bartley again stood for Parliament at the 2019 general election in the constituency of Dulwich and West Norwood, finishing second with 16.5% of the vote. This represented a 14% increase in the party's vote share, the largest for any Green candidate in the country at that election.

On 8 June 2020, Bartley announced his intention to stand again as co-leader alongside Berry. On 9 September, Bartley and Berry were re-elected, but with a decreased vote share.

Bartley was reported to have said that he personally supports the banning of halal slaughter. He later apologised, and clarified his position, saying he is against the suffering inflicted during slaughter on any un-stunned animals, and recognising that the majority of halal slaughter involves pre-stunning animals.

In May 2021, Bartley was a signatory to an open letter from Stylist magazine, alongside celebrities and other public figures, which called on the government to address what it described as an "epidemic of male violence" by funding an "ongoing, high-profile, expert-informed awareness campaign on men's violence against women and girls".

In July 2021, Bartley announced that he would be standing down as party co-leader later in the month, triggering a leadership contest.

== Music ==
Bartley is the drummer for the British blues rock band The Mustangs. The band are signed to the Trapeze music label, and have released ten albums, including a live album and a Best Of. In June 2017, they played at the Glastonbury Festival.

== Family ==
Bartley married Sarah Fletcher in 2022. He has three children with his former wife, Lucy, confirming their separation in May 2017. In December 2025 he and Sarah started fostering children.

== Books ==
- The Subversive Manifesto: lifting the lid on God's political agenda (Bible Reading Fellowship, 2004).
- Your Child and the Internet (Hodder, 2004).
- (Co-editor, with Simon Barrow) Consuming Passion: Why The Killing of Jesus Really Matters (DLT, 2005)
- Faith and Politics After Christendom: the church as a movement for anarchy (Paternoster, 2006).

Party political offices
Preceded by Natalie Bennett	Leader of the Green Party of England and Wales; 2016–2021; With: Caroline Lucas (2016–2018); Siân Berry (2018–2021)	Succeeded by Carla Denyer; Adrian Ramsay
