= David Taylor (Green politician) =

Environmentalist and politician (born 1957)

David Taylor (born 1957) is an environmentalist and politician in England.

Taylor was a founder member of the Green Party of England and Wales. In the 1980s, he founded the Green Gathering festival, and also organised the litter picking at the Glastonbury Festival. He also organised the Bath Anti-Nuclear Group.

Taylor served as a Principal Speaker of the party from 1994 to 1997 alongside first Jan Clark and then Peg Alexander. During this time, he campaigned for a decentralised party, committed to non-violent direct action. He was a Green Party in Northern Ireland candidate for Belfast West at the Northern Ireland Forum election in 1996, on a list which took only 156 votes. At the 1997 general election, he stood in Yeovil, where he took 1.3% of the votes cast. He has also stood for the South West England European Parliament constituency at each election since 1999, heading the party list in 1999 and 2004. The lists took between 7 and 10% of the votes cast, but he was not elected.

Taylor also runs a conference centre and retreat in Somerset.

Party political offices
Preceded by John Cornford	Principal Speaker of the Green Party of England and Wales; 1994–1997	Succeeded by Mike Woodin
