= Leadership approval opinion polling for the next United Kingdom general election =

In advance of the next United Kingdom general election various organisations continually conduct opinion polls to gauge the opinions that voters hold towards political leaders. Most of the polling companies listed are members of the British Polling Council (BPC) and abide by its disclosure rules. The dates of the polls range from the previous general election, held on 4 July 2024, to the present. In the tables below, the net figure may not always equal the difference between the positive and negative scores, due to rounding.

== Leadership approval ==
=== 2026 ===
Date(s) conducted	Pollster	Sample size	Question wording	Andy Burnham			Kemi Badenoch			Nigel Farage			Ed Davey			Zack Polanski			Rupert Lowe		
Date(s) conducted	Pollster	Sample size	Question wording	Pos.	Neg.	Net	Pos.	Neg.	Net	Pos.	Neg.	Net	Pos.	Neg.	Net	Pos.	Neg.	Net	Pos.	Neg.	Net
18–20 Nov	Opinium	2,050	Approve/Disapprove	40%	35%	+4	34%	33%	+1	26%	54%	–28	20%	28%	–8	16%	47%	–31	—N/a		
13–16 Nov	Deltapoll	2,026	Well/Badly	50%	40%	+10	45%	41%	+4	35%	54%	–19	—N/a			—N/a			—N/a		
13–15 Nov	More in Common	2,134	Good Job/Bad Job	40%	32%	+8	35%	35%	0	23%	58%	–34	18%	33%	–14	14%	51%	–37	14%	36%	–22
11–12 Nov	Survation	2,005	Well/Not Well	48%	35%	+13	45%	30%	+15	34%	49%	–15	30%	37%	–7	23%	49%	–26	—N/a		
11–12 Nov	Survation	2,005	Like/Dislike	47%	28%	+19	39%	30%	+10	33%	48%	–15	27%	27%	0	—N/a			—N/a		
11–12 Nov	YouGov	2,301	Favourable/Unfavourable	49%	41%	+8	34%	47%	–13	23%	68%	–45	26%	38%	–12	18%	55%	–37	—N/a		
6–9 Nov	More in Common	2,013	Good Job/Bad Job	41%	31%	+10	34%	30%	+4	23%	53%	–30	17%	30%	–12	14%	47%	–33	14%	33%	–19
6–9 Nov	Deltapoll	2,023	Well/Badly	51%	39%	+12	46%	40%	+6	37%	54%	–17	—N/a			—N/a			—N/a		
4–6 Nov	Opinium	2,003	Approve/Disapprove	38%	33%	+5	32%	32%	–1	24%	52%	–27	22%	27%	–5	17%	47%	–30	—N/a		
30 Oct – 2 Nov	Deltapoll	2,215	Well/Badly	55%	37%	+18	48%	39%	+9	36%	56%	–20	—N/a			—N/a			—N/a		
29 Oct – 2 Nov	Lord Ashcroft Polls (Note: Pollster is not a member of the British Polling Council.)	5,253	Good Job/Bad Job	43%	28%	+15	32%	29%	+3	17%	59%	–42	10%	26%	–16	9%	52%	–43	—N/a		
31 Oct – 1 Nov	More in Common	2,602	Good Job/Bad Job	40%	30%	+10	36%	29%	+8	25%	51%	–26	18%	30%	–11	14%	48%	–34	15%	32%	–16
30 Oct – 1 Nov	Freshwater Strategy	1,219	Favourable/Unfavourable	48%	32%	+16	37%	32%	+5	31%	52%	–21	24%	26%	–2	19%	43%	–24	—N/a		
28–30 Oct	Opinium	2,000	Approve/Disapprove	40%	33%	+7	33%	31%	+2	24%	50%	–26	20%	27%	–7	16%	48%	–32	—N/a		
28–29 Oct	BMG Research	1,529	Satisfied/Dissatisfied	36%	33%	+3	31%	25%	+6	27%	47%	–20	17%	28%	–11	17%	46%	–29	—N/a		
23–26 Oct	Deltapoll	1,932	Well/Badly	55%	35%	+20	48%	39%	+9	36%	55%	–19	—N/a			—N/a			—N/a		
23–26 Oct	More in Common	3,286	Good Job/Bad Job	39%	31%	+8	33%	31%	+2	24%	52%	–28	17%	30%	–13	14%	49%	–36	14%	33%	–18
21–23 Oct	Opinium	2,050	Approve/Disapprove	38%	32%	+6	31%	31%	–1	24%	52%	–28	19%	27%	–7	16%	47%	–31	—N/a		
15–22 Oct	Ipsos	1,009	Satisfied/Dissatisfied	35%	45%	–10	35%	39%	–4	22%	64%	–42	20%	42%	–22	17%	56%	–39	—N/a		
9–22 Oct	YouGov	2,062	Approve/Disapprove	46%	41%	+5	—N/a			—N/a			—N/a			—N/a			—N/a		
16–19 Oct	More in Common	3,069	Good Job/Bad Job	40%	30%	+9	34%	29%	+5	25%	53%	–27	18%	29%	–11	14%	49%	–34	15%	30%	–14
15–16 Oct	YouGov	2,071	Favourable/Unfavourable	46%	42%	+4	33%	48%	–15	25%	67%	–42	24%	40%	–16	19%	56%	–37	15%	35%	–20
9–13 Oct	Ipsos	2,257	Favourable/Unfavourable	39%	31%	+8	28%	40%	–12	25%	56%	–31	19%	34%	–15	16%	52%	–36	16%	47%	–31
9–12 Oct	More in Common	2,101	Good Job/Bad Job	40%	29%	+11	35%	30%	+5	26%	52%	–26	19%	30%	–11	16%	50%	–35	16%	31%	–15
9–11 Oct	Freshwater Strategy	1,235	Favourable/Unfavourable	42%	38%	+3	35%	34%	+1	30%	54%	–23	21%	29%	–7	18%	48%	–30	—N/a		
7–9 Oct	Opinium	2,050	Approve/Disapprove	39%	31%	+8	31%	32%	–1	25%	51%	–26	21%	27%	–6	17%	46%	–29	—N/a		
3–5 Oct	More in Common	2,041	Good Job/Bad Job	43%	27%	+16	33%	31%	+2	28%	52%	–24	19%	30%	–10	16%	44%	–28	15%	30%	–15
2–5 Oct	Survation	1,974	Well/Not Well	49%	34%	+16	42%	33%	+9	38%	46%	–8	37%	34%	+3	28%	43%	–15	—N/a		
2–5 Oct	Survation	1,974	Like/Dislike	47%	28%	+19	36%	31%	+5	34%	49%	–15	27%	29%	–2	21%	43%	–22	—N/a		
30 Sep – 2 Oct	Opinium	2,050	Approve/Disapprove	39%	31%	+8	31%	32%	–1	27%	49%	–22	22%	28%	–6	18%	40%	–22	—N/a		
30 Sep	Convergent Opinion (Note: Respondents were shown a video of Burnham's Labour Party conference speech. It's not clear whether these responses were before or after viewing the video.)	3,464	Well/Not Well	60%	26%	+33	—N/a			—N/a			—N/a			—N/a			—N/a		
30 Sep	Convergent Opinion	3,464	Positive/Negative	52%	45%	+7	—N/a			—N/a			—N/a			—N/a			—N/a		
25–29 Sep	More in Common	2,041	Good Job/Bad Job	39%	28%	+11	32%	32%	0	28%	52%	–24	21%	29%	–8	17%	42%	–24	17%	28%	–11
24–28 Sep	Lord Ashcroft Polls	5,039	Good Job/Bad Job	40%	27%	+13	28%	30%	–2	20%	57%	–37	13%	27%	–14	14%	41%	–27	—N/a		
23–25 Sep	Opinium	2,050	Approve/Disapprove	37%	30%	+7	29%	32%	–3	26%	51%	–25	22%	26%	–4	17%	41%	–24	—N/a		
23–24 Sep	BMG Research	1,515	Satisfied/Dissatisfied	33%	31%	+2	28%	26%	+2	25%	48%	–23	17%	28%	–11	17%	39%	–22	—N/a		
22–23 Sep	Survation	1,224	Well/Not Well	48%	32%	+16	42%	33%	+9	37%	48%	–12	40%	33%	+7	28%	43%	–15	—N/a		
22–23 Sep	Survation	1,224	Like/Dislike	45%	29%	+16	39%	31%	+7	32%	50%	–19	28%	27%	+1	19%	45%	–26	—N/a		
18–23 Sep	Ipsos	2,284	Favourable/Unfavourable	39%	32%	+7	28%	40%	–12	22%	58%	–36	23%	30%	–7	18%	46%	–28	15%	47%	–32
19–21 Sep	YouGov	1,782	Well/Badly	41%	36%	+5	36%	35%	+1	26%	57%	–31	26%	31%	–5	21%	48%	–27	—N/a		
18–21 Sep	More in Common	2,113	Good Job/Bad Job	38%	28%	+10	33%	31%	+1	25%	52%	–27	20%	27%	–7	16%	43%	–27	16%	27%	–11
10–21 Sep	YouGov	2,042	Approve/Disapprove	45%	39%	+6	—N/a			—N/a			—N/a			—N/a			—N/a		
16–18 Sep	Opinium	2,050	Approve/Disapprove	35%	31%	+5	27%	33%	–6	24%	52%	–28	19%	27%	–8	20%	43%	–23	—N/a		
13–15 Sep	Public First	2,028	Favourable/Unfavourable	46%	31%	+16	38%	34%	+4	34%	53%	–19	—N/a			—N/a			—N/a		
11–15 Sep	More in Common	2,038	Good Job/Bad Job	37%	27%	+11	30%	29%	+1	25%	53%	–28	18%	28%	–10	14%	43%	–29	16%	27%	–11
10–15 Sep	Ipsos	1,031	Satisfied/Dissatisfied	31%	44%	–13	28%	46%	–19	24%	61%	–37	23%	40%	–16	18%	50%	–32	—N/a		
11–14 Sep	Deltapoll (Note: Respondents were also asked their opinion of John Swinney. The results were Pos. 23%, Neg. 33%, Net -10.)	2,056	Well/Badly	54%	33%	+21	44%	39%	+5	36%	54%	–18	38%	38%	0	32%	45%	–13	28%	43%	–15
9–11 Sep	Opinium	2,050	Approve/Disapprove	35%	30%	+5	31%	31%	0	26%	52%	–26	21%	24%	–3	18%	41%	–22	—N/a		
4–11 Sep	Find Out Now	5,549	Favourable/Unfavourable	—N/a			—N/a			—N/a			—N/a			—N/a			12%	34%	–22
9–10 Sep	YouGov	2,099	Favourable/Unfavourable	46%	39%	+7	32%	47%	–15	24%	69%	–45	28%	36%	–8	19%	48%	–29	—N/a		
9–10 Sep	Survation	2,043	Well/Not Well	45%	33%	+12	42%	32%	+10	33%	50%	–17	37%	30%	+7	29%	39%	–10	—N/a		
9–10 Sep	Survation	2,043	Like/Dislike	43%	28%	+16	37%	29%	+8	32%	49%	–17	27%	28%	–1	21%	41%	–19	—N/a		
4–6 Sep	More in Common	2,130	Good Job/Bad Job	39%	25%	+13	33%	29%	+4	26%	52%	–26	22%	25%	–3	16%	43%	–28	17%	24%	–7
4–6 Sep	Freshwater Strategy	1,249	Favourable/Unfavourable	45%	28%	+17	33%	30%	+3	29%	52%	–24	26%	23%	+3	20%	39%	–20	—N/a		
2–4 Sep	Opinium	2,050	Approve/Disapprove	39%	24%	+14	29%	31%	–1	26%	51%	–26	21%	26%	–6	19%	41%	–21	—N/a		
3 Sep	Find Out Now	1,500	Favourable/Unfavourable	28%	26%	+2	26%	30%	–4	20%	49%	–29	15%	29%	–14	15%	41%	–23	—N/a		
28–31 Aug	More in Common	2,522	Good Job/Bad Job	37%	24%	+13	30%	29%	+1	25%	52%	–27	20%	25%	–5	15%	43%	–28	15%	26%	–11
26–28 Aug	Opinium	2,003	Approve/Disapprove	37%	23%	+14	28%	31%	–4	27%	50%	–23	18%	26%	–7	20%	41%	–21	—N/a		
21–27 Aug	Ipsos	2,277	Favourable/Unfavourable	40%	27%	+13	27%	38%	–11	26%	54%	–28	23%	29%	–6	19%	44%	–25	17%	46%	–29
25–26 Aug	BMG Research	1,579	Satisfied/Dissatisfied	30%	25%	+5	27%	27%	0	26%	46%	–20	18%	26%	–8	17%	39%	–22	—N/a		
22–24 Aug	YouGov	1,783	Well/Badly	43%	31%	+12	36%	36%	0	26%	59%	–33	28%	31%	–3	21%	49%	–28	—N/a		
21–24 Aug	Deltapoll	2,032	Well/Badly	56%	30%	+26	48%	35%	+13	38%	54%	–16	—N/a			—N/a			—N/a		
21–23 Aug	More in Common	3,140	Good Job/Bad Job	37%	24%	+12	30%	30%	0	27%	49%	–22	19%	27%	–8	16%	41%	–26	17%	26%	–9
21–23 Aug	More in Common	2,055	Positive/Negative	39%	27%	+12	31%	30%	+1	27%	50%	–23	23%	25%	–3	17%	43%	–26	17%	26%	–9
19–20 Aug	YouGov	2,380	Approve/Disapprove	43%	38%	+5	—N/a			—N/a			—N/a			—N/a			—N/a		
18 Aug	Survation	2,013	Well/Not Well	45%	31%	+14	41%	35%	+7	33%	51%	–17	31%	33%	–2	26%	45%	–20	—N/a		
14–17 Aug	More in Common	2,055	Good Job/Bad Job	38%	22%	+16	33%	30%	+3	28%	48%	–20	20%	28%	–8	17%	42%	–25	—N/a		
13–17 Aug	Public First	2,007	Favourable/Unfavourable	45%	27%	+18	36%	34%	+2	33%	48%	–15	27%	29%	–2	23%	39%	–16	—N/a		
13–14 Aug	YouGov	2,101	Favourable/Unfavourable	46%	33%	+13	31%	47%	–16	23%	67%	–44	25%	33%	–8	19%	48%	–29	—N/a		
12–14 Aug	Opinium	2,050	Approve/Disapprove	35%	24%	+11	26%	31%	–4	25%	53%	–28	19%	25%	–6	18%	42%	–24	—N/a		
13 Aug	Find Out Now (Note: Respondents were also asked their opinion of Jeremy Corbyn. The results were Pos. 16%, Neg. 52%, Net -36.)	2,150	Favourable/Unfavourable	29%	29%	0	22%	37%	–15	22%	53%	–31	15%	27%	–12	16%	39%	–23	14%	28%	–14
10–13 Aug	Survation	2,004	Well/Not Well	46%	27%	+19	37%	35%	+2	32%	52%	–20	—N/a			—N/a			—N/a		
7–10 Aug	More in Common	2,128	Good Job/Bad Job	36%	22%	+14	30%	29%	+1	24%	51%	–27	19%	27%	–7	15%	44%	–29	—N/a		
7–10 Aug	Freshwater Strategy	1,248	Favourable/Unfavourable	42%	30%	+12	35%	31%	+4	31%	52%	–20	24%	28%	–4	20%	44%	–24	—N/a		
5–7 Aug	Opinium	2,050	Approve/Disapprove	37%	21%	+16	27%	32%	–5	26%	51%	–25	20%	24%	–4	19%	42%	–23	—N/a		
5–6 Aug	YouGov	2,108	Favourable/Unfavourable	47%	36%	+11	35%	46%	–11	27%	66%	–39	27%	37%	–10	19%	50%	–31	17%	37%	–20
30 Jul – 4 Aug	Ipsos	1,033	Satisfied/Dissatisfied	29%	30%	–1	29%	41%	–11	23%	61%	–38	19%	37%	–19	21%	48%	–27	—N/a		
30 Jul – 4 Aug	Ipsos	1,033	Like/Dislike	50%	31%	+19	33%	47%	–14	24%	65%	–41	31%	39%	–8	22%	53%	–31	—N/a		
31 Jul – 2 Aug	More in Common	3,384	Good Job/Bad Job	38%	18%	+20	32%	29%	+2	26%	51%	–25	21%	26%	–5	16%	44%	–28	—N/a		
29–31 Jul	Opinium	2,050	Approve/Disapprove	36%	20%	+16	31%	30%	+1	26%	50%	–24	24%	23%	+1	20%	40%	–20	—N/a		
28–29 Jul	BMG Research	1,559	Satisfied/Dissatisfied	26%	21%	+5	27%	28%	–1	23%	49%	–26	18%	25%	–7	18%	40%	–22	—N/a		
25–27 Jul	YouGov	1,778	Well/Badly	32%	21%	+11	38%	31%	+7	27%	55%	–28	29%	26%	+3	23%	43%	–20	—N/a		
24–27 Jul	Public First	1,995	Favourable/Unfavourable	45%	26%	+19	37%	32%	+5	33%	54%	–21	25%	29%	–4	22%	39%	–17	—N/a		
24–27 Jul	Deltapoll	2,021	Well/Badly	42%	24%	+18	44%	37%	+7	37%	54%	–17	—N/a			—N/a			—N/a		
22–24 Jul	Survation	1,021	Well/Not Well	39%	22%	+17	40%	28%	+12	37%	42%	–5	—N/a			—N/a			—N/a		
22–24 Jul	Survation	1,021	Favourable/Unfavourable	39%	25%	+14	33%	30%	+3	34%	43%	–9	27%	27%	–1	21%	38%	–17	—N/a		
21–23 Jul	Ipsos	1,050	Like/Dislike	28%	21%	+7	—N/a			—N/a			—N/a			—N/a			—N/a		
21–22 Jul	More in Common	3,118	Good Job/Bad Job	29%	16%	+13	31%	28%	+3	26%	48%	–22	21%	26%	–5	17%	39%	–22	—N/a		
21–22 Jul	YouGov	2,063	Favourable/Unfavourable	38%	35%	+3	33%	44%	–11	22%	68%	–46	26%	34%	–8	20%	46%	–26	—N/a		
17–22 Jul	Ipsos (Note: Fieldwork spanned Andy Burnham's election as Labour Party leader and his appointment as Prime Minister. Both Burnham and Keir Starmer were polled.)	2,255	Satisfied/Dissatisfied	32%	31%	+1	29%	40%	–11	25%	57%	–32	21%	33%	–12	21%	45%	–24	16%	48%	–32
20–21 Jul	YouGov	2,081	Approve/Disapprove	39%	34%	+5	—N/a			—N/a			—N/a			—N/a			—N/a		
20 Jul	Andy Burnham is appointed Prime Minister																				
17–20 Jul	Deltapoll (Note: The questions refer to Keir Starmer as the Prime Minister and Andy Burnham as the future Prime Minister.)	2,027	Well/Badly	38%	29%	+9	45%	39%	+6	40%	52%	–12	—N/a			—N/a			—N/a		

Date(s) conducted	Pollster	Sample size	Keir Starmer			Kemi Badenoch			Nigel Farage			Ed Davey			Zack Polanski			Rupert Lowe		
Date(s) conducted	Pollster	Sample size	Pos.	Neg.	Net	Pos.	Neg.	Net	Pos.	Neg.	Net	Pos.	Neg.	Net	Pos.	Neg.	Net	Pos.	Neg.	Net
17–22 Jul	Ipsos	2,255	22%	52%	–30	—N/a			—N/a			—N/a			—N/a			—N/a		
17–20 Jul	Deltapoll	2,027	28%	66%	–38	—N/a			—N/a			—N/a			—N/a			—N/a		
17 Jul	Andy Burnham is elected leader of the Labour Party																			
15–17 Jul	Opinium	2,050	20%	58%	–38	33%	30%	+3	26%	52%	–26	23%	25%	–2	22%	37%	–15	—N/a		
10–14 Jul	Survation (Note: Respondents were asked if they liked or disliked the politician.)	2,057	22%	55%	–33	36%	32%	+4	31%	49%	–18	25%	28%	–3	21%	42%	–22	—N/a		
12–13 Jul	YouGov (Note: Respondents were asked whether the politician would/will be/has been a good/great prime minister.)	2,104	16%	51%	–35	—N/a			—N/a			—N/a			—N/a			—N/a		
12–13 Jul	YouGov (Note: Respondents were asked whether they had a favourable or unfavourable opinion of the politician.)	2,104	28%	64%	–38	30%	50%	–20	25%	68%	–43	28%	36%	–8	22%	46%	–24	—N/a		
10–13 Jul	More in Common	2,198	19%	62%	–42	32%	28%	+3	26%	50%	–24	20%	26%	–6	19%	37%	–19	—N/a		
10–12 Jul	Convergent Opinion	2,498	24%	69%	–45	37%	42%	–5	30%	62%	–33	—N/a			22%	49%	–27	—N/a		
7–10 Jul	Opinium	2,050	17%	62%	–45	29%	32%	–3	26%	52%	–27	21%	26%	–5	21%	38%	–16	—N/a		
7–9 Jul	Survation	2,058	—N/a			42%	42%	0	36%	56%	–20	38%	40%	–3	29%	50%	–20	—N/a		
3–6 Jul	More in Common	2,119	21%	60%	–39	30%	31%	–1	30%	46%	–16	19%	26%	–7	17%	38%	–22	—N/a		
3–5 Jul	Freshwater Strategy	1,240	23%	63%	–40	38%	32%	+7	37%	48%	–11	25%	28%	–3	21%	41%	–20	—N/a		
1–3 Jul	Opinium	2,050	17%	60%	–43	28%	34%	–6	28%	47%	–19	22%	27%	–5	22%	38%	–17	—N/a		
25–30 Jun	Ipsos	1,045	17%	76%	–59	28%	50%	–22	26%	63%	–37	19%	44%	–26	23%	48%	–26	—N/a		
26–29 Jun	Public First	2,013	25%	57%	–32	35%	33%	+2	34%	49%	–15	—N/a			24%	40%	–16	20%	32%	–13
26–29 Jun	More in Common (Note: Respondents were asked whether they thought the politician was doing a good job or a bad job.)	2,852	19%	63%	–44	31%	32%	–2	29%	46%	–17	21%	28%	–7	18%	40%	–22	—N/a		
25–29 Jun	Survation (Note: Respondents were asked whether the politician was doing well as leader of their party.)	2,041	14%	70%	–56	38%	32%	+6	38%	40%	–2	—N/a			—N/a			—N/a		
25–29 Jun	Survation	2,041	22%	56%	–34	34%	31%	+3	32%	46%	–14	25%	26%	–1	18%	39%	–21	—N/a		
25–29 Jun	Survation	2,041	21%	53%	–32	33%	31%	+2	33%	42%	–9	24%	25%	–1	21%	38%	–17	—N/a		
25–29 Jun	Lord Ashcroft Polls	5,064	19%	58%	–39	27%	43%	–16	22%	63%	–41	17%	30%	–13	19%	42%	–23	12%	32%	–20
26–28 Jun	More in Common (Note: Respondents were asked whether they had a positive or negative view of the politician (wording may vary).)	2,852	21%	60%	–40	30%	34%	–4	27%	52%	–25	22%	29%	–7	17%	44%	–28	—N/a		
24–26 Jun	Opinium	2,050	19%	60%	–41	27%	35%	–8	26%	49%	–23	20%	25%	–5	20%	39%	–19	—N/a		
24–25 Jun	YouGov	2,075	27%	66%	–39	30%	51%	–21	26%	66%	–40	27%	39%	–12	23%	46%	–23	—N/a		
23–24 Jun	BMG Research	1,508	17%	61%	–44	26%	29%	–3	28%	44%	–16	18%	29%	–11	21%	36%	–15	—N/a		
22–24 Jun	Ipsos	1,000	20%	57%	–37	—N/a			—N/a			—N/a			—N/a			—N/a		
22 Jun	Keir Starmer announces his resignation as leader of the Labour Party and Prime Minister																			
21–22 Jun	YouGov	2,110	22%	67%	–45	31%	46%	–15	25%	65%	–40	27%	36%	–9	21%	47%	–26	16%	36%	–20
19–22 Jun	More in Common	2,993	19%	61%	–42	30%	34%	–4	28%	51%	–23	22%	30%	–7	18%	42%	–25	—N/a		
19–22 Jun	More in Common	2,993	18%	63%	–45	30%	31%	–1	29%	45%	–16	21%	27%	–7	18%	38%	–21	—N/a		
17–19 Jun	Opinium	2,050	19%	61%	–42	28%	32%	–4	27%	48%	–21	22%	26%	–5	22%	38%	–16	—N/a		
14–15 Jun	YouGov	2,099	24%	69%	–45	30%	50%	–20	26%	67%	–41	26%	38%	–12	22%	46%	–24	16%	31%	–15
12–15 Jun	More in Common	2,097	17%	65%	–48	30%	31%	–1	30%	44%	–14	19%	29%	–9	16%	41%	–25	—N/a		
11–15 Jun	Survation	1,003	25%	52%	–27	39%	29%	+10	36%	44%	–8	27%	27%	0	22%	39%	–17	—N/a		
9–10 Jun	YouGov	2,102	23%	69%	–46	—N/a			—N/a			—N/a			—N/a			—N/a		
5–9 Jun	Ipsos	2,247	20%	58%	–38	28%	40%	–12	26%	56%	–30	22%	32%	–10	20%	47%	–27	16%	41%	–25
5–9 Jun	More in Common	2,087	17%	64%	–47	26%	34%	–8	29%	49%	–20	18%	28%	–10	15%	40%	–25	—N/a		
7–8 Jun	YouGov	2,038	23%	68%	–45	30%	47%	–17	27%	64%	–37	25%	37%	–12	22%	44%	–22	15%	30%	–15
3–5 Jun	Opinium	2,050	18%	61%	–42	29%	33%	–4	29%	48%	–19	21%	25%	–4	21%	39%	–19	—N/a		
3–4 Jun	YouGov	2,065	21%	70%	–49	30%	51%	–21	27%	65%	–38	26%	39%	–13	22%	47%	–25	16%	29%	–13
29 May – 1 Jun	More in Common	2,211	19%	63%	–44	28%	32%	–4	31%	44%	–13	19%	30%	–12	17%	42%	–25	—N/a		
29–31 May	Freshwater Strategy	1,237	25%	61%	–36	34%	33%	+1	32%	50%	–17	25%	27%	–1	19%	42%	–23	—N/a		
28–29 May	YouGov	2,160	22%	70%	–48	31%	49%	–18	26%	64%	–38	26%	39%	–13	22%	48%	–26	16%	31%	–15
26–28 May	BMG Research (Note: Respondents were asked whether they were satisfied or dissatisfied with the politician's performance in their job.)	1,511	16%	64%	–48	28%	31%	–3	30%	45%	–15	17%	28%	–11	18%	41%	–19	—N/a		
26–28 May	BMG Research	1,511	19%	56%	–36	—N/a			—N/a			—N/a			—N/a			—N/a		
22–25 May	More in Common	2,111	17%	65%	–48	28%	34%	–6	29%	45%	–16	20%	29%	–9	16%	42%	–26	—N/a		
21–22 May	YouGov	2,060	22%	70%	–48	31%	49%	–18	27%	65%	–38	26%	40%	–14	23%	47%	–24	15%	28%	–13
20–22 May	Opinium	2,050	18%	61%	–43	28%	34%	–6	28%	47%	–19	22%	24%	–2	21%	39%	–18	—N/a		
19–20 May	YouGov	2,095	21%	72%	–51	—N/a			—N/a			—N/a			—N/a			—N/a		
13–20 May	Ipsos	1,137	16%	76%	–60	28%	48%	–20	27%	57%	–30	23%	41%	–18	21%	49%	–28	—N/a		
15–19 May	More in Common	2,599	18%	64%	–46	28%	34%	–5	30%	45%	–15	20%	30%	–10	16%	45%	–29	—N/a		
17–18 May	YouGov	2,122	24%	67%	–43	30%	51%	–21	27%	65%	–38	29%	37%	–8	23%	49%	–26	15%	27%	–12
12–13 May	YouGov	2,078	23%	69%	–46	31%	48%	–17	27%	64%	–37	29%	38%	–9	23%	50%	–27	—N/a		
9–12 May	More in Common	3,070	19%	65%	–46	27%	34%	–8	32%	42%	–11	20%	26%	–6	18%	40%	–22	—N/a		
8–12 May	Ipsos	2,191	20%	58%	–38	24%	45%	–21	28%	55%	–27	24%	31%	–7	23%	44%	–21	15%	38%	–23
10–11 May	YouGov	2,101	20%	72%	–52	31%	50%	–19	27%	65%	–38	28%	36%	–8	23%	48%	–25	16%	26%	–10
9–11 May	Freshwater Strategy	1,243	22%	62%	–40	34%	30%	+4	34%	47%	–13	28%	22%	+6	20%	37%	–17	—N/a		
7–8 May	YouGov	2,068	22%	71%	–49	29%	51%	–22	26%	66%	–40	26%	38%	–12	24%	46%	–22	17%	26%	–9
6–8 May	Opinium	2,050	18%	61%	–43	27%	36%	–9	28%	47%	–19	21%	27%	–6	22%	41%	–19	—N/a		
6–7 May	YouGov	2,057	23%	70%	–47	29%	51%	–22	26%	67%	–41	26%	37%	–11	21%	46%	–25	16%	28%	–12
5–6 May	YouGov	2,167	22%	69%	–47	31%	48%	–17	26%	67%	–41	25%	37%	–12	22%	46%	–24	17%	26%	–9
4–5 May	YouGov	2,147	22%	69%	–47	30%	49%	–19	27%	66%	–39	25%	39%	–14	22%	47%	–25	17%	25%	–8
1–4 May	More in Common	2,016	19%	65%	–45	27%	34%	–6	29%	45%	–16	18%	30%	–12	15%	42%	–27	—N/a		
30 Apr – 1 May	YouGov	2,060	22%	69%	–47	31%	48%	–17	27%	65%	–38	28%	37%	–9	24%	41%	–17	18%	25%	–7
29 Apr – 1 May	Opinium	2,051	18%	62%	–44	30%	34%	–4	28%	45%	–17	22%	25%	–3	22%	35%	–13	—N/a		
26 Apr – 1 May	Deltapoll	3,353	24%	68%	–44	40%	42%	–2	42%	45%	–3	33%	41%	–8	33%	41%	–8	—N/a		
29–30 Apr	BMG Research	1,521	16%	65%	–49	25%	30%	–5	28%	42%	–14	18%	26%	–8	23%	31%	–8	—N/a		
28–29 Apr	YouGov	2,063	22%	69%	–47	30%	50%	–20	27%	64%	–37	28%	35%	–7	24%	39%	–15	15%	27%	–12
26–27 Apr	YouGov	2,113	23%	69%	–46	32%	48%	–16	27%	65%	–38	27%	37%	–10	24%	39%	–15	16%	26%	–10
24–27 Apr	More in Common	2,041	19%	64%	–45	29%	34%	–5	29%	43%	–14	20%	30%	–10	19%	33%	–14	—N/a		
23–24 Apr	YouGov	2,076	22%	71%	–49	30%	51%	–21	26%	66%	–40	27%	35%	–8	24%	38%	–14	17%	24%	–7
22–24 Apr	Opinium	2,050	18%	62%	–44	29%	35%	–6	28%	46%	–18	22%	26%	–4	24%	33%	–9	—N/a		
21–22 Apr	YouGov	2,080	10%	58%	–48	—N/a			—N/a			—N/a			—N/a			—N/a		
20–21 Apr	YouGov	2,056	24%	69%	–45	29%	50%	–21	27%	65%	–38	30%	33%	–3	26%	34%	–8	—N/a		
17–21 Apr	Ipsos	2,262	19%	59%	–40	24%	42%	–18	27%	54%	–27	21%	34%	–13	24%	41%	–17	18%	33%	–15
18–20 Apr	YouGov	1,777	22%	69%	–47	32%	43%	–11	36%	47%	–11	29%	35%	–6	34%	35%	–1	—N/a		
17–20 Apr	More in Common	2,235	19%	62%	–43	25%	35%	–10	28%	44%	–16	20%	28%	–8	16%	33%	–17	—N/a		
15–17 Apr	Opinium	2,014	20%	58%	–38	26%	37%	–11	27%	47%	–20	21%	26%	–5	21%	33%	–12	—N/a		
15–16 Apr	YouGov	2,092	24%	69%	–45	29%	51%	–22	25%	68%	–43	26%	36%	–10	25%	38%	–13	17%	26%	–9
14–15 Apr	YouGov	2,151	24%	68%	–44	26%	51%	–25	26%	67%	–41	25%	37%	–12	21%	39%	–18	16%	25%	–9
9–15 Apr	Ipsos	1,044	18%	74%	–56	25%	52%	–27	29%	59%	–30	25%	41%	–16	28%	42%	–14	—N/a		
10–13 Apr	More in Common	2,011	18%	61%	–43	23%	36%	–13	26%	46%	–20	16%	31%	–15	16%	35%	–19	—N/a		
10–12 Apr	Freshwater Strategy	1,250	24%	58%	–34	29%	34%	–5	31%	48%	–17	23%	26%	–3	22%	30%	–8	—N/a		
2–7 Apr	More in Common	2,009	19%	61%	–42	24%	34%	–10	30%	44%	–14	18%	29%	–11	16%	32%	–16	—N/a		
28–30 Mar	More in Common	2,003	19%	61%	–42	25%	34%	–9	29%	46%	–17	18%	29%	–11	16%	32%	–16	—N/a		
25–26 Mar	BMG Research	1,507	17%	63%	–46	24%	31%	–7	28%	44%	–16	18%	27%	–9	24%	30%	–6	—N/a		
20–24 Mar	Ipsos	2,283	17%	59%	–42	22%	44%	–22	25%	54%	–29	21%	35%	–14	23%	37%	–14	15%	34%	–19
21–23 Mar	YouGov	1,815	20%	70%	–50	29%	48%	–19	—N/a			27%	36%	–9	—N/a			—N/a		
20–23 Mar	More in Common	2,408	20%	62%	–42	27%	36%	–9	30%	44%	–14	18%	29%	–11	19%	34%	–15	—N/a		
20 Mar	Restore Britain is registered with the Electoral Commission																			

Date(s) conducted	Pollster	Sample size	Keir Starmer			Kemi Badenoch			Nigel Farage			Ed Davey			Zack Polanski		
Date(s) conducted	Pollster	Sample size	Pos.	Neg.	Net	Pos.	Neg.	Net	Pos.	Neg.	Net	Pos.	Neg.	Net	Pos.	Neg.	Net
18–20 Mar	Opinium	2,050	20%	58%	–38	27%	36%	–9	28%	44%	–16	22%	27%	–5	23%	32%	–9
18–19 Mar	YouGov	2,134	22%	70%	–48	27%	52%	–25	27%	66%	–39	24%	38%	–14	22%	36%	–14
13–16 Mar	JL Partners	1,527	17%	57%	–40	—N/a			—N/a			—N/a			—N/a		
13–16 Mar	More in Common	2,402	19%	64%	–45	27%	35%	–8	30%	46%	–16	19%	29%	–10	18%	31%	–13
12–13 Mar	YouGov	2,102	20%	73%	–53	—N/a			—N/a			—N/a			—N/a		
5–11 Mar	Ipsos	1,062	19%	72%	–53	21%	56%	–35	29%	58%	–29	21%	43%	–22	30%	37%	–7
6–10 Mar	Focaldata	1,086	15%	63%	–48	22%	36%	–14	28%	45%	–17	16%	28%	–12	14%	32%	–18
6–9 Mar	More in Common	2,112	21%	62%	–41	28%	34%	–6	32%	45%	–13	18%	29%	–11	19%	31%	–12
4–6 Mar	Opinium	2,050	18%	60%	–42	24%	35%	–11	28%	46%	–18	22%	26%	–4	22%	32%	–10
5 Mar	Survation	1,045	22%	61%	–39	40%	29%	+11	44%	36%	+8	38%	30%	+8	39%	28%	+11
5 Mar	Survation	1,045	27%	52%	–25	34%	32%	+2	36%	42%	–6	28%	26%	+2	—N/a		
3–4 Mar	BMG Research	1,503	17%	60%	–43	25%	32%	–7	28%	42%	–14	19%	27%	–8	21%	31%	–10
27 Feb – 2 Mar	More in Common	2,010	20%	68%	–48	29%	39%	–10	36%	47%	–11	23%	31%	–8	27%	33%	–6
27 Feb – 1 Mar	Freshwater Strategy	1,221	21%	63%	–42	29%	33%	–4	32%	51%	–19	25%	23%	+2	22%	27%	–5
25–27 Feb	Opinium	2,050	15%	64%	–49	27%	35%	–8	31%	44%	–13	21%	26%	–5	22%	29%	–7
20–24 Feb	Ipsos	2,518	22%	61%	–39	26%	49%	–23	29%	56%	–27	26%	42%	–16	24%	42%	–18
21–23 Feb	YouGov	1,771	18%	73%	–55	32%	43%	–11	—N/a			30%	29%	+1	—N/a		
20–23 Feb	More in Common	2,015	18%	64%	–46	21%	37%	–16	28%	44%	–16	18%	27%	–9	—N/a		
19–23 Feb	Lord Ashcroft Polls	5,576	—N/a			21%	43%	–22	—N/a			—N/a			—N/a		
13–17 Feb	More in Common	2,108	20%	63%	–43	25%	37%	–12	29%	47%	–18	19%	30%	–11	—N/a		
10–11 Feb	YouGov	2,088	22%	69%	–47	27%	50%	–23	27%	64%	–37	27%	37%	–10	22%	30%	–8
6–10 Feb	Ipsos	1,119	17%	61%	–44	24%	42%	–18	31%	48%	–17	21%	31%	–10	24%	32%	–8
6–10 Feb	More in Common	2,035	16%	67%	–51	25%	35%	–10	30%	43%	–13	19%	29%	–10	—N/a		
4–6 Feb	Opinium	2,054	17%	61%	–44	26%	35%	–9	32%	43%	–11	22%	25%	–3	21%	24%	–3
3–4 Feb	YouGov	2,012	21%	71%	–50	—N/a			—N/a			—N/a			—N/a		
31 Jan – 2 Feb	More in Common	2,005	19%	64%	–45	24%	35%	–11	33%	43%	–10	18%	29%	–11	—N/a		
30 Jan – 1 Feb	Freshwater Strategy	1,250	20%	62%	–42	24%	38%	–14	33%	49%	–16	23%	28%	–5	18%	29%	–11
28–29 Jan	BMG Research	1,513	15%	64%	–49	22%	35%	–13	30%	44%	–14	19%	25%	–6	22%	24%	–2
22–27 Jan	Ipsos	1,104	15%	77%	–62	22%	53%	–31	28%	55%	–27	21%	40%	–19	22%	33%	–11
25–26 Jan	YouGov	2,183	20%	71%	–51	—N/a			—N/a			—N/a			—N/a		
24–26 Jan	YouGov	1,755	20%	71%	–51	29%	47%	–18	—N/a			29%	30%	–1	—N/a		
23–25 Jan	More in Common	2,016	20%	61%	–41	23%	37%	–14	30%	44%	–14	18%	30%	–12	—N/a		
21–23 Jan	Opinium	2,050	19%	60%	–41	25%	37%	–12	30%	44%	–14	22%	25%	–3	19%	26%	–7
16–19 Jan	Ipsos	1,138	17%	59%	–42	21%	48%	–27	26%	52%	–26	22%	35%	–13	20%	35%	–15
16–19 Jan	More in Common	2,007	17%	62%	–45	23%	35%	–12	29%	42%	–13	18%	28%	–10	—N/a		
16–19 Jan	Focaldata	1,585	17%	63%	–46	18%	34%	–16	29%	49%	–20	16%	27%	–11	13%	21%	–8
15–18 Jan	Opinium	2,047	18%	61%	–43	25%	34%	–9	30%	42%	–12	21%	25%	–4	—N/a		
15–16 Jan	YouGov	2,046	18%	75%	–57	25%	51%	–26	28%	65%	–37	26%	35%	–9	20%	27%	–7
10–14 Jan	Survation	2,006	21%	62%	–41	37%	32%	+5	44%	33%	+11	—N/a			31%	25%	+6
10–13 Jan	More in Common	2,036	17%	64%	–47	23%	37%	–14	31%	42%	–11	19%	31%	–12	16%	30%	–14
10–13 Jan	More in Common	2,036	18%	61%	–43	—N/a			—N/a			—N/a			—N/a		
9–11 Jan	Freshwater Strategy	1,250	21%	65%	–44	29%	35%	–6	37%	47%	–10	23%	25%	–2	17%	25%	–8
7–9 Jan	Opinium	2,050	17%	63%	–46	25%	36%	–11	30%	45%	–15	21%	23%	–2	21%	24%	–3
4–5 Jan	YouGov	2,102	18%	74%	–56	—N/a			—N/a			—N/a			—N/a		
2–5 Jan	More in Common	2,021	17%	64%	–47	22%	35%	–13	31%	41%	–10	18%	28%	–10	—N/a		
2–5 Jan	More in Common	2,016	18%	61%	–43	—N/a			—N/a			—N/a			—N/a		

=== 2025 ===
Date(s) conducted	Pollster	Sample size	Keir Starmer			Kemi Badenoch			Nigel Farage			Ed Davey			Zack Polanski		
Date(s) conducted	Pollster	Sample size	Pos.	Neg.	Net	Pos.	Neg.	Net	Pos.	Neg.	Net	Pos.	Neg.	Net	Pos.	Neg.	Net
27–29 Dec	YouGov	1,744	15%	73%	–58	28%	44%	–16	—N/a			28%	30%	–2	—N/a		
19–23 Dec	More in Common	2,026	18%	63%	–45	22%	40%	–18	30%	44%	–14	20%	30%	–10	—N/a		
16–18 Dec	Deltapoll	1,997	24%	70%	–46	36%	45%	–9	43%	47%	–4	—N/a			—N/a		
12–16 Dec	More in Common	2,037	17%	65%	–48	23%	38%	–15	32%	42%	–10	19%	31%	–12	—N/a		
14–15 Dec	YouGov	2,084	18%	72%	–54	26%	52%	–26	29%	64%	–35	26%	36%	–10	23%	29%	–6
11–12 Dec	YouGov	2,063	17%	76%	–59	—N/a			—N/a			—N/a			—N/a		
10–12 Dec	Opinium	2,053	18%	61%	–43	26%	36%	–10	31%	43%	–12	23%	26%	–3	—N/a		
4–8 Dec	More in Common	2,009	17%	65%	–48	25%	39%	–14	31%	43%	–12	18%	29%	–11	—N/a		
28 Nov – 2 Dec	Ipsos	1,124	17%	61%	–44	23%	42%	–19	29%	50%	–21	24%	32%	–8	20%	33%	–13
29 Nov – 1 Dec	YouGov	1,762	15%	76%	–61	30%	45%	–15	—N/a			29%	32%	–3	—N/a		
28 Nov – 1 Dec	More in Common	2,114	18%	66%	–48	26%	41%	–15	32%	43%	–11	22%	30%	–8	—N/a		
28–30 Nov	Freshwater Strategy	1,558	18%	66%	–48	28%	36%	–8	35%	47%	–12	23%	28%	–5	19%	24%	–5
26–28 Nov	Focaldata	1,343	18%	63%	–45	22%	37%	–15	31%	47%	–16	18%	31%	–13	14%	26%	–12
26–28 Nov	Opinium	2,050	18%	62%	–44	24%	37%	–13	31%	45%	–14	22%	25%	–3	22%	22%	0
26–27 Nov	BMG Research	1,548	18%	63%	–45	27%	30%	–3	33%	39%	–6	21%	26%	–5	22%	23%	–1
22–24 Nov	More in Common	2,062	17%	68%	–51	19%	41%	–22	33%	42%	–9	17%	31%	–14	—N/a		
18–21 Nov	Focaldata	1,725	17%	64%	–47	21%	35%	–14	31%	45%	–14	18%	28%	–10	13%	23%	–10
16–20 Nov	Survation	2,082	25%	57%	–32	34%	35%	–1	46%	31%	+15	—N/a			—N/a		
16–20 Nov	Survation	2,082	27%	51%	–24	32%	33%	–1	38%	38%	0	29%	25%	+4	—N/a		
17–19 Nov	Opinium	2,050	17%	62%	–45	22%	38%	–16	33%	43%	–10	23%	26%	–3	22%	24%	–2
17–18 Nov	YouGov	2,138	19%	74%	–55	—N/a			—N/a			—N/a			—N/a		
16–17 Nov	YouGov	2,112	19%	73%	–54	21%	53%	–32	30%	62%	–32	25%	34%	–9	20%	22%	–2
14–17 Nov	More in Common	2,052	17%	66%	–49	18%	41%	–23	31%	43%	–12	18%	29%	–11	—N/a		
7–10 Nov	Ipsos	1,133	19%	61%	–42	18%	52%	–34	30%	51%	–21	21%	34%	–13	25%	30%	–5
7–10 Nov	More in Common	2,011	17%	66%	–49	18%	43%	–25	30%	43%	–13	19%	29%	–10	—N/a		
7–9 Nov	Freshwater Strategy	1,250	20%	65%	–45	22%	38%	–16	34%	47%	–13	23%	26%	–3	19%	20%	–1
5–7 Nov	Opinium	2,050	17%	62%	–45	21%	38%	–17	32%	42%	–10	23%	25%	–2	21%	22%	–1
3–7 Nov	Find Out Now	1,972	8%	70%	–62	12%	48%	–36	34%	38%	–4	19%	30%	–11	19%	24%	–5
30 Oct – 5 Nov	Ipsos	1,148	13%	79%	–66	17%	58%	–41	31%	52%	–21	20%	42%	–22	24%	32%	–8
1–3 Nov	YouGov	1,752	17%	73%	–56	20%	53%	–33	—N/a			29%	32%	–3	—N/a		
31 Oct – 3 Nov	More in Common	2,031	17%	65%	–48	16%	42%	–26	31%	43%	–12	17%	31%	–13	—N/a		
28–29 Oct	YouGov	2,136	—N/a			23%	42%	–19	—N/a			—N/a			—N/a		
24–27 Oct	More in Common	2,030	17%	64%	–47	16%	40%	–24	31%	41%	–10	18%	28%	–10	14%	21%	–7
22–24 Oct	Opinium	2,030	18%	62%	–44	21%	38%	–17	30%	44%	–14	21%	24%	–3	20%	22%	–2
17–20 Oct	More in Common	2,084	17%	64%	–47	16%	41%	–25	31%	45%	–14	18%	26%	–8	—N/a		
8–17 Oct	Focaldata	2,057	22%	58%	–36	24%	34%	–10	36%	42%	–6	21%	25%	–4	14%	21%	–7
15–16 Oct	YouGov	2,167	20%	72%	–52	—N/a			—N/a			—N/a			—N/a		
13–14 Oct	YouGov	2,150	21%	72%	–51	21%	54%	–33	30%	63%	–33	29%	33%	–4	17%	21%	–4
12–13 Oct	YouGov	2,086	21%	71%	–50	21%	54%	–33	28%	64%	–36	28%	35%	–7	17%	26%	–9
10–13 Oct	Ipsos	1,141	20%	60%	–40	22%	44%	–22	36%	45%	–9	24%	31%	–7	21%	29%	–8
10–13 Oct	More in Common	2,004	19%	63%	–44	18%	40%	–22	32%	44%	–12	20%	27%	–7	—N/a		
8–10 Oct	Opinium	2,015	19%	61%	–42	23%	37%	–14	33%	40%	–7	21%	24%	–3	19%	21%	–2
4–6 Oct	YouGov	1,748	18%	72%	–54	15%	56%	–41	—N/a			31%	32%	–1	—N/a		
3–6 Oct	More in Common	2,003	16%	65%	–49	13%	46%	–33	32%	42%	–10	18%	32%	–14	—N/a		
3–5 Oct	Freshwater Strategy	1,251	22%	63%	–41	24%	40%	–16	39%	42%	–3	23%	24%	–1	—N/a		
3 Oct	Find Out Now	2,006	10%	68%	–58	8%	50%	–42	36%	38%	–2	18%	33%	–15	—N/a		
1–3 Oct	Opinium	2,050	19%	63%	–44	18%	40%	–22	35%	43%	–8	21%	25%	–4	18%	19%	–1
19 Sep – 1 Oct	Focaldata	2,014	19%	59%	–40	19%	36%	–17	32%	45%	–13	21%	28%	–7	10%	20%	–10
28–29 Sep	YouGov	2,353	23%	70%	–47	18%	54%	–36	31%	62%	–31	29%	33%	–4	10%	20%	–10
26–29 Sep	More in Common	2,012	17%	64%	–47	19%	40%	–21	33%	41%	–8	22%	26%	–4	—N/a		
24–26 Sep	Opinium	2,050	20%	61%	–41	19%	41%	–22	35%	40%	–5	27%	24%	+3	17%	20%	–3
24–25 Sep	Survation	2,027	27%	51%	–24	28%	36%	–8	42%	37%	+5	27%	28%	–1	—N/a		
19–22 Sep	Savanta	2,086	16%	61%	–45	—N/a			—N/a			—N/a			—N/a		
19–22 Sep	More in Common	2,055	20%	59%	–39	18%	42%	–24	33%	41%	–8	22%	29%	–7	—N/a		
17–19 Sep	Opinium	2,050	18%	60%	–42	18%	40%	–22	33%	41%	–8	23%	23%	0	18%	19%	–1
16–17 Sep	YouGov	2,245	18%	73%	–55	—N/a			—N/a			—N/a			—N/a		
11–17 Sep	Ipsos	1,157	13%	79%	–66	14%	61%	–47	34%	53%	–19	23%	38%	–15	—N/a		
12–15 Sep	More in Common	2,037	17%	63%	–46	18%	41%	–23	31%	39%	–8	19%	29%	–10	—N/a		
11–15 Sep	Opinium	2,011	16%	62%	–46	20%	38%	–18	33%	39%	–6	20%	24%	–4	16%	21%	–5
10–11 Sep	YouGov	2,287	21%	71%	–50	19%	54%	–35	30%	61%	–31	27%	33%	–6	10%	20%	–10
5–9 Sep	Ipsos	2,272	21%	54%	–33	18%	43%	–25	33%	45%	–12	23%	27%	–4	18%	26%	–8
7–8 Sep	YouGov	2,237	23%	69%	–46	18%	57%	–39	28%	63%	–35	26%	34%	–8	12%	22%	–10
6–8 Sep	YouGov	1,763	18%	73%	–55	16%	54%	–38	—N/a			29%	28%	+1	—N/a		
5–8 Sep	More in Common	2,106	18%	62%	–44	16%	42%	–26	33%	37%	–4	19%	27%	–8	—N/a		
2–6 Sep	Find Out Now	2,343	10%	67%	–57	8%	50%	–42	38%	33%	+5	18%	28%	–10	—N/a		
3–5 Sep	Opinium	2,050	19%	59%	–40	19%	38%	–19	33%	40%	–7	21%	23%	–2	—N/a		
2 Sep	Zack Polanski is elected Leader of the Green Party of England and Wales																

Date(s) conducted	Pollster	Sample size	Keir Starmer			Kemi Badenoch			Nigel Farage			Ed Davey			Carla Denyer			Adrian Ramsay		
Date(s) conducted	Pollster	Sample size	Pos.	Neg.	Net	Pos.	Neg.	Net	Pos.	Neg.	Net	Pos.	Neg.	Net	Pos.	Neg.	Net	Pos.	Neg.	Net
31 Aug – 1 Sep	YouGov	2,268	—N/a			—N/a			48%	30%	+18	—N/a			—N/a			—N/a		
28 Aug – 1 Sep	More in Common	2,042	20%	63%	–43	16%	43%	–27	32%	42%	–10	18%	28%	–10	—N/a			—N/a		
29–31 Aug	Freshwater Strategy	1,251	21%	62%	–41	22%	39%	–17	38%	44%	–6	24%	27%	–3	—N/a			—N/a		
26–28 Aug	BMG Research	1,504	19%	60%	–41	19%	28%	–9	37%	32%	+5	22%	17%	+5	—N/a			—N/a		
25–26 Aug	YouGov	2,192	22%	69%	–47	—N/a			—N/a			—N/a			—N/a			—N/a		
22–26 Aug	More in Common	2,032	19%	61%	–42	18%	39%	–21	35%	36%	–1	21%	25%	–4	—N/a			—N/a		
20–22 Aug	Opinium	2,050	19%	60%	–41	17%	40%	–23	31%	42%	–11	21%	24%	–3	—N/a			—N/a		
15–19 Aug	Focaldata	1,500	23%	57%	–34	23%	36%	–13	34%	41%	–7	23%	27%	–4	—N/a			—N/a		
15–18 Aug	Ipsos	1,135	22%	54%	–32	20%	47%	–27	31%	47%	–16	25%	32%	–8	—N/a			—N/a		
15–18 Aug	More in Common	2,000	20%	61%	–41	18%	41%	–23	33%	39%	–6	20%	27%	–7	—N/a			—N/a		
14–15 Aug	YouGov	2,016	24%	68%	–44	21%	52%	–31	32%	61%	–29	30%	33%	–3	9%	14%	–5	5%	13%	–8
9–11 Aug	YouGov	1,744	20%	69%	–49	16%	56%	–40	—N/a			28%	30%	–2	—N/a			—N/a		
8–11 Aug	More in Common	2,015	20%	59%	–39	18%	39%	–21	32%	37%	–5	19%	28%	–9	—N/a			—N/a		
6–8 Aug	Opinium	2,050	19%	60%	–41	19%	39%	–20	32%	41%	–9	22%	22%	0	—N/a			—N/a		
3 Aug	Find Out Now	1,884	10%	65%	–55	8%	48%	–40	35%	35%	0	17%	26%	–9	—N/a			—N/a		
1–3 Aug	More in Common	2,042	19%	62%	–43	17%	41%	–24	32%	39%	–7	18%	26%	–8	—N/a			—N/a		
1–3 Aug	Freshwater Strategy	1,259	23%	60%	–37	24%	35%	–11	37%	41%	–4	23%	27%	–4	—N/a			—N/a		
29–31 Jul	BMG Research	1,528	20%	56%	–36	21%	29%	–8	36%	30%	+6	22%	16%	+6	—N/a			—N/a		
26–28 Jul	More in Common	2,040	20%	61%	–41	15%	43%	–28	30%	41%	–11	19%	27%	–8	—N/a			—N/a		
23–25 Jul	Opinium	2,050	22%	57%	–35	16%	39%	–23	33%	40%	–7	21%	23%	–2	—N/a			—N/a		
18–20 Jul	More in Common	2,153	19%	62%	–43	17%	38%	–21	33%	39%	–6	17%	26%	–9	—N/a			—N/a		
15–16 Jul	YouGov	2,006	24%	68%	–44	—N/a			—N/a			—N/a			—N/a			—N/a		
13–14 Jul	YouGov	2,285	23%	67%	–44	19%	54%	–35	30%	61%	–31	27%	33%	–6	8%	15%	–7	4%	14%	–10
11–14 Jul	Ipsos	1,144	21%	55%	–34	17%	47%	–30	32%	46%	–14	22%	34%	–12	—N/a			—N/a		
11–14 Jul	More in Common	3,026	20%	59%	–39	17%	41%	–24	30%	39%	–9	18%	28%	–10	—N/a			—N/a		
9–11 Jul	Opinium	2,052	18%	60%	–42	18%	37%	–19	30%	41%	–11	21%	22%	–1	—N/a			—N/a		
5–7 Jul	YouGov	1,702	19%	69%	–50	16%	53%	–37	—N/a			29%	25%	+4	—N/a			—N/a		
4–7 Jul	More in Common	2,084	20%	56%	–36	15%	37%	–22	30%	39%	–9	18%	23%	–5	—N/a			—N/a		
4–6 Jul	Freshwater Strategy	1,259	23%	61%	–38	22%	38%	–16	33%	46%	–13	27%	25%	+2	—N/a			—N/a		
2–3 Jul	More in Common	1,855	18%	61%	–43	15%	36%	–21	31%	37%	–6	17%	23%	–6	—N/a			—N/a		
1–2 Jul	Find Out Now	1,950	9%	65%	–56	9%	46%	–37	34%	35%	–1	19%	27%	–8	—N/a			—N/a		
27–30 Jun	More in Common	2,532	20%	60%	–40	17%	41%	–24	31%	39%	–8	21%	27%	–6	—N/a			—N/a		
25–27 Jun	Survation	2,002	33%	54%	–21	34%	38%	–4	49%	32%	+17	—N/a			—N/a			—N/a		
25–27 Jun	Survation	2,002	33%	48%	–15	31%	31%	0	39%	41%	–2	29%	22%	+7	—N/a			—N/a		
25–27 Jun	Opinium	2,050	21%	56%	–35	16%	40%	–24	30%	40%	–10	22%	21%	+1	—N/a			—N/a		
24–25 Jun	BMG Research	1,617	24%	53%	–29	22%	27%	–5	35%	29%	+6	23%	16%	+7	—N/a			—N/a		
20–23 Jun	More in Common	2,004	23%	54%	–31	14%	41%	–27	29%	42%	–13	18%	27%	–9	—N/a			—N/a		
8–17 Jun	YouGov	10,035	27%	64%	–37	19%	53%	–34	30%	62%	–32	27%	34%	–7	—N/a			—N/a		
15–16 Jun	YouGov	2,220	28%	62%	–34	19%	53%	–34	30%	61%	–31	27%	32%	–5	9%	15%	–6	5%	13%	–8
13–16 Jun	Ipsos	1,135	24%	52%	–28	18%	49%	–31	31%	48%	–17	26%	33%	–7	—N/a			—N/a		
13–16 Jun	More in Common	2,032	20%	58%	–38	14%	45%	–31	28%	39%	–11	17%	26%	–9	—N/a			—N/a		
11–13 Jun	Opinium	2,050	21%	55%	–34	18%	37%	–19	30%	41%	–11	22%	21%	+1	—N/a			—N/a		
10–11 Jun	Survation	2,010	29%	50%	–21	31%	38%	–7	40%	37%	+3	31%	29%	+2	—N/a			—N/a		
7–9 Jun	YouGov	1,700	23%	65%	–42	15%	57%	–42	—N/a			30%	28%	+2	—N/a			—N/a		
6–9 Jun	More in Common	2,073	19%	58%	–39	14%	43%	–29	29%	42%	–13	17%	26%	–9	—N/a			—N/a		
6–9 Jun	More in Common	2,073	20%	57%	–36	15%	42%	–27	29%	48%	–19	18%	27%	–8	—N/a			—N/a		
6–8 Jun	Freshwater Strategy	1,260	24%	56%	–32	22%	37%	–15	38%	40%	–2	26%	23%	+3	—N/a			—N/a		
3–4 Jun	Find Out Now	2,041	14%	57%	–43	5%	50%	–45	38%	31%	+7	19%	25%	–6	—N/a			—N/a		
30 May – 4 Jun	Ipsos	1,180	19%	73%	–54	11%	60%	–49	34%	49%	–15	23%	38%	–15	—N/a			—N/a		
1–2 Jun	YouGov	2,009	25%	65%	–40	—N/a			—N/a			—N/a			—N/a			—N/a		
30 May – 2 Jun	Survation	1,096	32%	54%	–22	33%	40%	–7	53%	28%	+25	—N/a			—N/a			—N/a		
30 May – 2 Jun	Survation	1,096	32%	46%	–14	31%	30%	+1	41%	38%	+3	29%	23%	+6	—N/a			—N/a		
30 May – 2 Jun	More in Common	2,016	21%	57%	–36	16%	43%	–27	31%	39%	–8	19%	28%	–9	—N/a			—N/a		
29–30 May	YouGov	2,075	24%	64%	–40	16%	51%	–35	—N/a			—N/a			—N/a			—N/a		
28–30 May	Opinium	2,050	20%	56%	–36	15%	42%	–27	31%	42%	–11	19%	24%	–5	—N/a			—N/a		
28–29 May	BMG Research	1,510	23%	54%	–31	17%	25%	–8	34%	32%	+2	21%	17%	+4	—N/a			—N/a		
23–26 May	More in Common	2,000	21%	59%	–38	14%	39%	–25	32%	38%	–6	18%	24%	–6	—N/a			—N/a		
16–19 May	More in Common	2,090	21%	58%	–37	16%	41%	–25	33%	39%	–6	20%	27%	–7	—N/a			—N/a		
14–16 May	Opinium	2,050	21%	55%	–34	19%	39%	–20	33%	38%	–5	24%	23%	+1	—N/a			—N/a		
13–14 May	YouGov	2,171	23%	69%	–46	16%	55%	–39	32%	59%	–27	26%	34%	–8	10%	15%	–5	4%	14%	–10
12–13 May	YouGov	2,227	24%	67%	–43	—N/a			—N/a			—N/a			—N/a			—N/a		
9–13 May	Ipsos	2,284	23%	54%	–31	17%	49%	–32	31%	50%	–19	25%	32%	–7	—N/a			—N/a		
10–12 May	YouGov	1,734	27%	62%	–35	17%	55%	–38	—N/a			33%	27%	+6	—N/a			—N/a		
10–12 May	More in Common	2,094	22%	56%	–34	15%	40%	–25	32%	36%	–4	18%	27%	–9	—N/a			—N/a		
5–11 May	Find Out Now	2,182	11%	64%	–53	8%	50%	–42	42%	27%	+15	22%	27%	–5	—N/a			—N/a		
6–8 May	BMG Research	1,525	20%	59%	–39	20%	25%	–5	35%	32%	+3	22%	19%	+3	—N/a			—N/a		
2–5 May	Ipsos	1,099	24%	50%	–26	—N/a			—N/a			—N/a			—N/a			—N/a		
2–5 May	Survation	2,032	28%	52%	–24	24%	37%	–13	36%	39%	–3	25%	26%	–1	14%	23%	–9 (Note: Denyer and Ramsay approval was polled as a single prompt.)	14%	23%	–9
3–4 May	More in Common	2,212	19%	57%	–38	16%	39%	–23	32%	35%	–3	20%	25%	–5	—N/a			—N/a		
30 Apr – 2 May	Opinium	2,050	22%	56%	–34	19%	39%	–20	26%	43%	–17	21%	24%	–3	—N/a			—N/a		
25–27 Apr	More in Common	2,009	23%	56%	–33	20%	33%	–13	28%	39%	–11	19%	26%	–7	—N/a			—N/a		
23–25 Apr	Opinium	2,050	22%	56%	–34	20%	38%	–18	29%	41%	–12	20%	25%	–5	—N/a			—N/a		
17–21 Apr	More in Common	2,004	22%	56%	–34	15%	40%	–25	25%	42%	–17	16%	30%	–14	—N/a			—N/a		
13–14 Apr	YouGov	2,162	28%	62%	–34	16%	54%	–38	27%	65%	–38	24%	35%	–11	8%	16%	–8	4%	13%	–9
12–14 Apr	YouGov	1,713	26%	61%	–35	15%	50%	–35	—N/a			30%	26%	+4	—N/a			—N/a		
11–14 Apr	More in Common	2,277	21%	55%	–34	14%	37%	–23	25%	41%	–16	17%	28%	–11	—N/a			—N/a		
11–14 Apr	Focaldata	1,585	20%	55%	–35	19%	32%	–13	29%	44%	–15	21%	26%	–5	12%	16%	–4	—N/a		
9–11 Apr	Opinium	2,050	25%	55%	–30	19%	39%	–20	28%	43%	–15	22%	24%	–2	—N/a			—N/a		
9–10 Apr	YouGov	2,001	30%	63%	–33	—N/a			—N/a			—N/a			—N/a			—N/a		
2–8 Apr	JL Partners (Note: Respondents were asked whether they approved or disapproved of how the leader was doing their job (wording may vary).)	2,086	27%	53%	–26	25%	34%	–9	39%	35%	+4	—N/a			—N/a			—N/a		
2–8 Apr	JL Partners	2,086	28%	51%	–23	25%	34%	–9	35%	42%	–7	24%	27%	–3	12%	19%	–7	11%	15%	–4
6–7 Apr	YouGov	2,178	27%	60%	–33	14%	52%	–38	29%	47%	–18	27%	30%	–3	—N/a			—N/a		
4–7 Apr	Deltapoll	1,524	24%	52%	–28	—N/a			—N/a			—N/a			—N/a			—N/a		
4–7 Apr	More in Common	2,058	23%	55%	–32	17%	36%	–19	27%	41%	–14	20%	28%	–8	—N/a			—N/a		
3–5 Apr	Find Out Now	2,209	15%	59%	–44	7%	43%	–36	26%	41%	–15	20%	27%	–7	—N/a			—N/a		
31 Mar – 1 Apr	YouGov	2,213	16%	45%	–29	—N/a			—N/a			—N/a			—N/a			—N/a		
28–31 Mar	More in Common	2,081	21%	56%	–35	15%	36%	–21	26%	41%	–15	17%	27%	–10	—N/a			—N/a		
26–28 Mar	Opinium	2,050	22%	54%	–32	17%	38%	–21	26%	42%	–16	20%	22%	–2	—N/a			—N/a		
26–27 Mar	BMG Research	1,544	24%	54%	–30	22%	24%	–2	29%	36%	–7	23%	16%	+7	—N/a			—N/a		
21–26 Mar	Ipsos	1,072	27%	47%	–20	18%	40%	–22	28%	43%	–15	26%	29%	–3	—N/a			—N/a		
22–24 Mar	More in Common	2,077	22%	54%	–32	16%	40%	–24	25%	42%	–17	16%	27%	–11	—N/a			—N/a		
19–21 Mar	Opinium	2,078	24%	53%	–29	20%	35%	–15	28%	40%	–12	22%	21%	+1	—N/a			—N/a		
16–17 Mar	YouGov	2,081	32%	60%	–28	18%	52%	–34	27%	65%	–38	27%	33%	–6	8%	15%	–7	5%	12%	–7
15–17 Mar	YouGov	1,707	31%	56%	–25	17%	47%	–30	—N/a			29%	26%	+3	—N/a			—N/a		
14–17 Mar	Ipsos	1,132	29%	46%	–17	18%	44%	–26	29%	49%	–20	24%	30%	–6	—N/a			—N/a		
14–17 Mar	Deltapoll	1,974	31%	62%	–31	28%	45%	–17	—N/a			—N/a			—N/a			—N/a		
14–17 Mar	More in Common	2,432	24%	51%	–27	16%	35%	–19	26%	40%	–14	17%	24%	–7	—N/a			—N/a		
13–14 Mar	YouGov	2,155	32%	58%	–26	—N/a			—N/a			—N/a			—N/a			—N/a		
10–11 Mar	YouGov	2,076	30%	62%	–32	16%	50%	–34	26%	65%	–39	25%	31%	–6	—N/a			—N/a		
7–10 Mar	More in Common	2,041	25%	51%	–26	15%	37%	–22	25%	43%	–18	17%	25%	–8	—N/a			—N/a		
5–10 Mar	Find Out Now	2,310	20%	50%	–30	9%	43%	–34	25%	41%	–16	20%	25%	–5	—N/a			—N/a		
6–9 Mar	JL Partners	2,012	28%	47%	–19	26%	31%	–5	33%	42%	–9	22%	25%	–3	10%	17%	–7	10%	18%	–8
5–7 Mar	Opinium	2,050	26%	49%	–23	19%	36%	–17	29%	39%	–10	23%	21%	+2	—N/a			—N/a		
4–5 Mar	YouGov	2,147	31%	59%	–28	17%	51%	–34	30%	60%	–30	27%	32%	–5	7%	13%	–6	4%	12%	–8
3 Mar	Redfield & Wilton Strategies (Note: As of August 2026, Redfield & Wilton Strategies is no longer listed as a member of the British Polling Council. Its research archive of polling data is available only by subscription. All links to polling results are redirected to the company's website home page and are effectively dead links.)	1,398	32%	46%	–14	—N/a			—N/a			—N/a			—N/a			—N/a		
28 Feb – 3 Mar	More in Common	2,010	24%	52%	–28	15%	35%	–20	26%	41%	–15	16%	26%	–10	—N/a			—N/a		
25–26 Feb	BMG Research	1,586	24%	54%	–30	23%	22%	+1	32%	33%	–1	23%	18%	+5	—N/a			—N/a		
21–24 Feb	More in Common	2,013	19%	58%	–39	13%	37%	–24	26%	38%	–12	—N/a			—N/a			—N/a		
19–21 Feb	Opinium	2,050	21%	55%	–34	18%	38%	–20	30%	38%	–8	21%	22%	–1	—N/a			—N/a		
13–21 Feb	JL Partners	6,049	24%	52%	–28	23%	31%	–8	33%	36%	–3	—N/a			—N/a			—N/a		
13–21 Feb	JL Partners	6,049	25%	51%	–26	24%	31%	–7	33%	40%	–7	20%	23%	–3	10%	15%	–5	9%	13%	–4
17–19 Feb	Find Out Now	2,056	14%	59%	–45	8%	45%	–37	32%	36%	–4	19%	26%	–7	—N/a			—N/a		
18 Feb	Redfield & Wilton Strategies	1,500	30%	48%	–18	—N/a			—N/a			—N/a			—N/a			—N/a		
14–18 Feb	More in Common	4,101	20%	57%	–37	15%	36%	–21	30%	38%	–8	16%	26%	–10	—N/a			—N/a		
16–17 Feb	YouGov	2,436	26%	66%	–40	17%	51%	–34	30%	60%	–30	27%	32%	–5	7%	13%	–5	4%	12%	–8
15–16 Feb	YouGov	1,688	23%	66%	–43	16%	51%	–35	—N/a			28%	29%	–1	—N/a			—N/a		
12 Feb	Redfield & Wilton Strategies	2,300	—N/a			29%	24%	+5	—N/a			—N/a			—N/a			—N/a		
7–11 Feb	Ipsos	2,248	21%	55%	–34	16%	45%	–29	31%	46%	–15	21%	33%	–12	—N/a			—N/a		
7–10 Feb	More in Common	2,005	19%	60%	–41	17%	36%	–19	29%	40%	–11	19%	24%	–5	—N/a			—N/a		
5–7 Feb	Opinium	2,050	22%	56%	–34	20%	35%	–15	31%	38%	–7	22%	21%	+1	—N/a			—N/a		
4–5 Feb	YouGov	2,275	—N/a			25%	33%	–8	—N/a			—N/a			—N/a			—N/a		
31 Jan – 3 Feb	More in Common	2,044	18%	56%	–38	15%	33%	–18	26%	38%	–12	15%	24%	–9	—N/a			—N/a		
28 Jan – 3 Feb	Find Out Now	1,810	11%	57%	–46	10%	38%	–28	30%	33%	–3	16%	24%	–8	—N/a			—N/a		
28–29 Jan	BMG Research	1,514	22%	55%	–33	23%	23%	0	32%	35%	–3	22%	18%	+4	—N/a			—N/a		
28–29 Jan	Survation	2,010	31%	55%	–24	33%	36%	–3	—N/a			—N/a			—N/a			—N/a		
28–29 Jan	Survation	2,010	30%	49%	–19	33%	31%	+2	35%	42%	–7	28%	25%	+3	—N/a			—N/a		
24–27 Jan	More in Common	2,009	16%	58%	–42	16%	32%	–16	27%	39%	–12	15%	24%	–9	—N/a			—N/a		
22–24 Jan	Opinium	2,050	21%	55%	–34	19%	34%	–15	32%	39%	–7	21%	21%	0	—N/a			—N/a		
17–20 Jan	More in Common	2,016	20%	56%	–36	16%	33%	–17	27%	39%	–12	15%	24%	–9	—N/a			—N/a		
17–20 Jan	Deltapoll	1,500	29%	64%	–35	29%	45%	–16	—N/a			—N/a			—N/a			—N/a		
11–13 Jan	YouGov	1,698	24%	65%	–41	18%	44%	–26	—N/a			31%	24%	+7	—N/a			—N/a		
10–13 Jan	Ipsos	1,139	25%	52%	–27	16%	46%	–30	26%	51%	–25	25%	27%	–2	—N/a			—N/a		
10–13 Jan	More in Common	2,102	19%	58%	–39	14%	32%	–18	25%	42%	–17	—N/a			—N/a			—N/a		
8–10 Jan	Opinium	2,050	22%	55%	–33	21%	34%	–13	30%	39%	–9	22%	20%	+2	—N/a			—N/a		
30 Dec – 3 Jan	Deltapoll	1,532	26%	68%	–42	25%	46%	–21	—N/a			—N/a			—N/a			—N/a		

=== 2024 ===
Date(s) conducted	Pollster	Sample size	Keir Starmer			Kemi Badenoch			Nigel Farage			Ed Davey			Carla Denyer			Adrian Ramsay		
Date(s) conducted	Pollster	Sample size	Pos.	Neg.	Net	Pos.	Neg.	Net	Pos.	Neg.	Net	Pos.	Neg.	Net	Pos.	Neg.	Net	Pos.	Neg.	Net
19–23 Dec	Deltapoll	1,552	28%	64%	–36	34%	38%	–4	—N/a			—N/a			—N/a			—N/a		
18–20 Dec	Opinium	2,010	22%	54%	–32	21%	32%	–12	29%	38%	–9	23%	20%	+3	—N/a			—N/a		
14–16 Dec	YouGov	1,722	26%	61%	–35	20%	37%	–17	—N/a			30%	24%	+6	—N/a			—N/a		
12–16 Dec	Survation	2,030	33%	50%	–17	29%	35%	–6	—N/a			—N/a			—N/a			—N/a		
12–16 Dec	Survation	2,030	35%	44%	–9	36%	25%	+11	37%	37%	0	29%	23%	+6	—N/a			—N/a		
12–13 Dec	YouGov	2,215	25%	66%	–41	18%	49%	–31	28%	62%	–34	—N/a			—N/a			—N/a		
6–10 Dec	More in Common	2,432	20%	55%	–35	18%	27%	–9	27%	38%	–10	16%	25%	–8	—N/a			—N/a		
27 Nov – 4 Dec	Ipsos	1,028	27%	61%	–34	19%	34%	–15	—N/a			30%	27%	+3	—N/a			—N/a		
27–29 Nov	Opinium	2,020	22%	54%	–32	22%	28%	–6	29%	38%	–9	22%	21%	+1	—N/a			—N/a		
26–27 Nov	BMG Research	1,531	25%	53%	–28	23%	16%	+7	27%	34%	–7	23%	18%	+5	—N/a			—N/a		
26–27 Nov	More in Common	1,749	24%	53%	–29	20%	26%	–6	25%	41%	–16	—N/a			—N/a			—N/a		
14–18 Nov	Deltapoll	1,749	29%	61%	–32	24%	38%	–14	—N/a			—N/a			—N/a			—N/a		
13–14 Nov	JL Partners	2,024	25%	46%	–21	26%	22%	+4	—N/a			—N/a			—N/a			—N/a		
13–14 Nov	JL Partners	2,024	25%	48%	–23	22%	23%	–1	31%	41%	–10	20%	21%	–1	12%	12%	0	11%	10%	+1
11–13 Nov	Opinium	2,068	25%	50%	–25	20%	25%	–5	29%	37%	–8	23%	19%	+3	—N/a			—N/a		
8–11 Nov	Ipsos	1,139	23%	52%	–29	21%	39%	–18	28%	48%	–20	21%	31%	–10	17%	26%	–9	16%	26%	–10
8–11 Nov	More in Common	2,111	24%	48%	–25	17%	19%	–3	—N/a			16%	21%	–5	—N/a			—N/a		
8–10 Nov	YouGov	2,099	28%	61%	–33	21%	41%	–20	30%	61%	–31	24%	31%	–7	7%	14%	–7	4%	12%	–8
2 Nov	Kemi Badenoch is elected leader of the Conservative Party																			

Date(s) conducted	Pollster	Sample size	Keir Starmer			Rishi Sunak			Nigel Farage			Ed Davey			Carla Denyer			Adrian Ramsay		
Date(s) conducted	Pollster	Sample size	Pos.	Neg.	Net	Pos.	Neg.	Net	Pos.	Neg.	Net	Pos.	Neg.	Net	Pos.	Neg.	Net	Pos.	Neg.	Net
30–31 Oct	BMG Research	1,511	23%	49%	–26	28%	33%	–5	28%	35%	–7	19%	19%	0	—N/a			—N/a		
30–31 Oct	Opinium	2,016	26%	50%	–24	23%	45%	–22	28%	40%	–12	23%	19%	+4	—N/a			—N/a		
19–21 Oct	YouGov	1,688	26%	58%	–32	—N/a			—N/a			26%	23%	+3	—N/a			—N/a		
18–20 Oct	Savanta	2,135	30%	48%	–18	28%	49%	–21	31%	46%	–14	22%	28%	–5	15%	20%	–5	13%	20%	–7
16–18 Oct	Opinium	2,007	21%	53%	–32	20%	45%	–25	25%	39%	–14	22%	20%	+2	—N/a			—N/a		
9–10 Oct	More in Common	2,073	18%	56%	–38	18%	49%	–31	—N/a			—N/a			—N/a			—N/a		
5–7 Oct	More in Common	2,023	21%	54%	–33	19%	51%	–32	—N/a			—N/a			—N/a			—N/a		
4–7 Oct	Deltapoll	2,108	30%	61%	–31	27%	65%	–38	—N/a			—N/a			—N/a			—N/a		
4–6 Oct	YouGov	2,121	27%	63%	–36	24%	66%	–42	28%	63%	–35	25%	32%	–7	—N/a			—N/a		
2–4 Oct	Opinium	2,055	24%	52%	–28	18%	47%	–29	26%	42%	–16	21%	21%	0	—N/a			—N/a		
2–3 Oct	BMG Research	1,562	25%	50%	–25	23%	41%	–18	29%	32%	–4	21%	20%	+1	—N/a			—N/a		
25–27 Sep	Opinium	2,003	23%	53%	–30	20%	46%	–26	29%	40%	–11	22%	23%	–1	—N/a			—N/a		
24–25 Sep	More in Common	2,080	21%	48%	–27	17%	52%	–35	25%	42%	–17	19%	23%	–4	—N/a			—N/a		
24–25 Sep	More in Common	2,080	—N/a			20%	52%	–32	26%	40%	–20	—N/a			—N/a			—N/a		
21–22 Sep	YouGov	1,690	29%	54%	–25	—N/a			—N/a			35%	22%	+13	—N/a			—N/a		
20–22 Sep	YouGov	2,137	30%	60%	–30	24%	68%	–44	28%	63%	–35	27%	36%	–9	—N/a			—N/a		
18–20 Sep	Opinium	2,050	24%	50%	–26	21%	46%	–25	27%	39%	–12	24%	21%	+3	—N/a			—N/a		
7–9 Sep	More in Common	2,024	25%	45%	–20	17%	53%	–37	23%	42%	–18	15%	23%	–8	—N/a			—N/a		
29 Aug	BMG Research	1,560	28%	44%	–16	22%	46%	–24	28%	37%	–9	19%	21%	–2	—N/a			—N/a		
24–27 Aug	More in Common	2,015	27%	43%	–16	17%	57%	–41	—N/a			—N/a			—N/a			—N/a		
24–26 Aug	YouGov	1,684	35%	43%	–8	—N/a			—N/a			27%	21%	+6	—N/a			—N/a		
14–16 Aug	Opinium	2,000	32%	38%	–6	20%	50%	–30	24%	43%	–19	21%	21%	0	—N/a			—N/a		
7–8 Aug	We Think	1,278	31%	34%	–3	20%	36%	–16	—N/a			—N/a			—N/a			—N/a		
7–8 Aug	We Think	1,278	33%	42%	–10	22%	57%	–35	29%	44%	–15	18%	36%	–17	14%	28%	–14	10%	26%	–16
5–7 Aug	BMG Research	1,523	30%	33%	–3	19%	42%	–23	23%	37%	–14	21%	16%	+5	—N/a			—N/a		
5–6 Aug	YouGov	2,163	37%	53%	–16	23%	71%	–48	25%	67%	–42	—N/a			—N/a			—N/a		
31 Jul – 2 Aug	Opinium	2,063	35%	32%	+3	18%	48%	–30	25%	40%	–15	24%	19%	+5	19%	17%	+2	19%	17%	+2
30–31 Jul	YouGov	2,233	40%	49%	–9	23%	70%	–47	27%	62%	–35	27%	33%	–6	9%	12%	–3	3%	10%	–7
25–26 Jul	We Think	2,012	38%	22%	+16	24%	35%	–11	—N/a			—N/a			—N/a			—N/a		
25–26 Jul	We Think	2,012	42%	37%	+5	25%	61%	–36	30%	50%	–20	21%	36%	–15	16%	34%	–18	12%	32%	–20
17–19 Jul	Opinium	2,010	38%	20%	+18	20%	42%	–22	—N/a			25%	18%	+7	21%	15%	+6	21%	15%	+6
11–12 Jul	We Think	2,005	38%	15%	+23	21%	31%	–9	—N/a			—N/a			—N/a			—N/a		
11–12 Jul	We Think	2,005	44%	34%	+10	23%	58%	–35	28%	46%	–18	21%	35%	–14	15%	33%	–18	12%	33%	–21
5–8 Jul	YouGov	2,102	44%	47%	–3	23%	70%	–47	27%	65%	–38	34%	29%	+5	13%	16%	–3	7%	14%	–7
5–6 Jul	Ipsos	1,141	40%	33%	+7	21%	57%	–36	26%	52%	–26	29%	26%	+3	—N/a			—N/a		

== Party approval ==
=== 2026 ===
Date(s) conducted	Pollster	Sample size	Labour			Conservative			Reform			Lib Dems			Green			Your			Restore		
Date(s) conducted	Pollster	Sample size	Pos.	Neg.	Net	Pos.	Neg.	Net	Pos.	Neg.	Net	Pos.	Neg.	Net	Pos.	Neg.	Net	Pos.	Neg.	Net	Pos.	Neg.	Net
30 Oct – 1 Nov	Freshwater Strategy	1,219	39%	42%	–2	35%	43%	–7	32%	49%	–17	30%	35%	–5	29%	42%	–13	18%	42%	–25	27%	45%	–19
9–13 Oct	Ipsos	2,257	31%	40%	–9	24%	46%	–22	26%	54%	–28	21%	38%	–17	22%	46%	–24	17%	29%	–12	17%	50%	–33
9–11 Oct	Freshwater Strategy	1,235	35%	47%	–11	33%	46%	–13	32%	50%	–18	28%	36%	–8	26%	47%	–21	15%	48%	–32	26%	47%	–21
2–5 Oct	Survation	1,974	39%	42%	–3	35%	42%	–7	35%	47%	–13	28%	38%	–10	26%	46%	–20	—N/a			—N/a		
24–28 Sep	Lord Ashcroft Polls	5,039	27%	50%	–23	24%	54%	–30	23%	62%	–39	22%	39%	–17	27%	46%	–19	—N/a			—N/a		
22–23 Sep	Survation	1,224	38%	45%	–7	35%	41%	–6	34%	48%	–14	27%	38%	–11	26%	46%	–20	—N/a			—N/a		
18–23 Sep	Ipsos	2,284	30%	42%	–12	24%	46%	–22	25%	55%	–30	24%	34%	–10	22%	43%	–21	20%	28%	–8	17%	51%	–34
9–10 Sep	Survation	2,043	35%	43%	–8	34%	40%	–6	32%	49%	–17	29%	36%	–7	25%	43%	–18	—N/a			—N/a		
4–6 Sep	Freshwater Strategy	1,249	37%	45%	–8	34%	45%	–12	32%	50%	–18	30%	33%	–3	31%	38%	–7	15%	41%	–26	25%	43%	–18
21–27 Aug	Ipsos	2,277	30%	40%	–10	23%	46%	–23	27%	52%	–25	24%	33%	–9	25%	40%	–15	20%	24%	–4	17%	48%	–31
7–10 Aug	Freshwater Strategy	1,248	34%	50%	–16	33%	44%	–11	35%	49%	–14	30%	36%	–6	30%	42%	–11	17%	46%	–29	26%	44%	–18
30 Jul – 4 Aug	Ipsos	1,033	30%	51%	–21	24%	56%	–32	26%	62%	–36	27%	43%	–16	33%	42%	–9	—N/a			—N/a		
30–31 Jul	YouGov	2,027	34%	59%	–25	30%	63%	–33	27%	65%	–38	36%	49%	–13	33%	56%	–23	—N/a			—N/a		
25–27 Jul	Survation	1,012	35%	41%	–6	37%	37%	0	34%	43%	–9	30%	34%	–4	29%	39%	–9	—N/a			—N/a		
22–24 Jul	Survation	1,021	36%	39%	–3	32%	37%	–5	34%	40%	–6	30%	32%	–2	28%	36%	–7	—N/a			—N/a		
17–20 Jul	Andy Burnham is elected leader of the Labour Party and appointed Prime Minister three days later																						
10–14 Jul	Survation	2,057	30%	46%	–15	34%	40%	–6	34%	45%	–11	28%	35%	–7	29%	41%	–13	—N/a			—N/a		
3–5 Jul	Freshwater Strategy	1,240	27%	54%	–26	35%	42%	–7	38%	46%	–8	30%	35%	–6	31%	42%	–11	17%	45%	–29	26%	39%	–13
28–29 Jun	YouGov	2,207	28%	63%	–35	29%	62%	–33	29%	63%	–34	34%	48%	–14	36%	52%	–16	—N/a			19%	55%	–36
26–29 Jun	Public First	2,013	31%	43%	–12	—N/a			—N/a			—N/a			—N/a			—N/a			—N/a		
25–29 Jun	Survation	2,041	28%	47%	–19	32%	38%	–6	34%	43%	–9	27%	31%	–4	26%	40%	–14	—N/a			—N/a		
22 Jun	Keir Starmer announces his resignation as leader of the Labour Party and Prime Minister																						
5–9 Jun	Ipsos	2,247	21%	53%	–32	23%	47%	–24	27%	53%	–26	24%	33%	–9	25%	43%	–18	20%	28%	–8	17%	44%	–27
29–31 May	Freshwater Strategy	1,237	28%	54%	–25	31%	46%	–15	36%	47%	–11	30%	34%	–4	32%	41%	–9	17%	47%	–30	23%	31%	–7
8–12 May	Ipsos	2,191	22%	54%	–32	22%	52%	–30	29%	53%	–24	25%	32%	–7	29%	42%	–13	18%	29%	–11	15%	41%	–26
9–10 May	Freshwater Strategy	1,243	26%	55%	–29	33%	43%	–10	38%	45%	–7	33%	29%	+4	34%	38%	–4	17%	43%	–26	25%	23%	+2
29–30 Apr	BMG Research	1,521	17%	46%	–29	13%	51%	–38	28%	31%	–3	9%	59%	–50	15%	45%	–30	—N/a			—N/a		
17–21 Apr	Ipsos	2,262	20%	55%	–35	22%	49%	–27	27%	50%	–23	22%	37%	–15	28%	40%	–12	19%	33%	–14	19%	38%	–19
10–13 Apr	More in Common	2,011	16%	59%	–43	18%	45%	–27	—N/a			—N/a			—N/a			—N/a			—N/a		
10–12 Apr	Freshwater Strategy	1,250	25%	51%	–26	28%	47%	–19	35%	43%	–8	32%	31%	+1	34%	33%	+1	17%	42%	–25	23%	21%	+2
20–24 Mar	Ipsos	2,283	19%	54%	–35	20%	52%	–32	25%	53%	–28	22%	36%	–14	27%	39%	–12	16%	32%	–16	16%	38%	–22
20 Mar	Restore Britain is registered with the Electoral Commission																						
5 Mar	Survation	1,045	29%	50%	–21	34%	42%	–8	37%	41%	–4	30%	29%	+1	33%	32%	+1	—N/a			Did not exist		
27 Feb – 2 Mar	More in Common	2,010	19%	66%	–47	22%	51%	–29	—N/a			—N/a			32%	32%	0	—N/a			Did not exist		
27 Feb – 1 Mar	Freshwater Strategy	1,221	25%	57%	–32	28%	48%	–20	34%	45%	–11	31%	34%	–3	37%	31%	+6	18%	45%	–27	Did not exist		
20–24 Feb	Ipsos	2,518	27%	58%	–31	26%	56%	–30	30%	56%	–26	25%	48%	–23	28%	47%	–19	—N/a			Did not exist		
20–23 Feb	More in Common	2,015	18%	60%	–42	17%	46%	–29	—N/a			—N/a			—N/a			—N/a			Did not exist		
13–17 Feb	More in Common	2,108	19%	64%	–45	20%	46%	–26	—N/a			—N/a			—N/a			—N/a			Did not exist		
6–10 Feb	Ipsos	1,119	20%	56%	–36	22%	50%	–28	32%	47%	–15	24%	38%	–14	28%	37%	–9	11%	53%	–42	Did not exist		
6–10 Feb	More in Common	2,035	15%	66%	–51	20%	46%	–26	—N/a			—N/a			—N/a			—N/a			Did not exist		
31 Jan – 2 Feb	More in Common	2,005	20%	61%	–41	18%	47%	–29	—N/a			—N/a			—N/a			—N/a			Did not exist		
30 Jan – 1 Feb	Freshwater Strategy	1,250	23%	57%	–34	27%	51%	–24	35%	46%	–11	30%	34%	–4	31%	36%	–5	20%	48%	–28	Did not exist		
23–25 Jan	More in Common	2,016	19%	57%	–38	18%	48%	–30	—N/a			—N/a			—N/a			—N/a			Did not exist		
16–19 Jan	Ipsos	1,138	21%	57%	–36	19%	53%	–34	27%	51%	–24	22%	37%	–15	27%	36%	–9	14%	36%	–22	Did not exist		
16–19 Jan	More in Common	2,007	17%	60%	–43	18%	49%	–31	—N/a			—N/a			—N/a			—N/a			Did not exist		
10–13 Jan	More in Common	2,036	17%	62%	–45	19%	47%	–28	—N/a			—N/a			—N/a			—N/a			Did not exist		
9–11 Jan	Freshwater Strategy	1,250	26%	60%	–34	33%	45%	–12	37%	42%	–5	30%	33%	–3	31%	33%	–2	28%	20%	+8	Did not exist		
2–5 Jan	More in Common	2,021	18%	62%	–44	18%	42%	–24	—N/a			—N/a			—N/a			—N/a			Did not exist		

=== 2025 ===
Date(s) conducted	Pollster	Sample size	Labour			Conservative			Reform			Lib Dems			Green			Your		
Date(s) conducted	Pollster	Sample size	Pos.	Neg.	Net	Pos.	Neg.	Net	Pos.	Neg.	Net	Pos.	Neg.	Net	Pos.	Neg.	Net	Pos.	Neg.	Net
19–23 Dec	More in Common	2,026	20%	62%	–42	19%	48%	–29	—N/a			—N/a			—N/a			—N/a		
12–16 Dec	More in Common	2,009	16%	62%	–46	20%	48%	–28	—N/a			—N/a			—N/a			—N/a		
4–8 Dec	More in Common	2,009	15%	65%	–50	19%	46%	–27	—N/a			—N/a			—N/a			—N/a		
28 Nov – 2 Dec	Ipsos	1,124	19%	56%	–37	21%	50%	–29	29%	48%	–19	24%	36%	–12	27%	37%	–10	11% (Note: Framed as "a new left wing party founded by Jeremy Corbyn and Zarah Sultana")	56%	–45
28 Nov – 1 Dec	More in Common	2,114	17%	65%	–48	21%	49%	–28	—N/a			—N/a			—N/a			—N/a		
29–30 Nov	Your Party hosts its founding conference, formally adopting 'Your Party' as its name and agreeing a collective leadership model																			
28–30 Nov	Freshwater Strategy	1,558	23%	60%	–37	30%	48%	–18	38%	41%	–3	31%	31%	0	34%	32%	+2	Did not exist		
22–24 Nov	More in Common	2,062	16%	65%	–49	17%	51%	–34	—N/a			—N/a			—N/a			Did not exist		
16–20 Nov	Survation	2,082	30%	48%	–18	33%	40%	–7	40%	35%	+5	31%	29%	+2	32%	30%	+2	Did not exist		
14–17 Nov	More in Common	2,052	17%	64%	–47	16%	50%	–34	—N/a			—N/a			—N/a			Did not exist		
7–10 Nov	Ipsos	1,133	20%	56%	–36	20%	53%	–33	30%	50%	–20	24%	34%	–10	31%	33%	–2	Did not exist		
7–10 Nov	More in Common	2,011	17%	64%	–47	15%	52%	–37	—N/a			—N/a			—N/a			Did not exist		
7–9 Nov	Freshwater Strategy	1,250	23%	59%	–36	27%	47%	–20	36%	43%	–7	30%	32%	–2	37%	26%	+11	Did not exist		
31 Oct – 3 Nov	More in Common	2,030	18%	64%	–46	15%	50%	–35	—N/a			—N/a			—N/a			Did not exist		
24–27 Oct	More in Common	2,030	16%	66%	–50	15%	50%	–35	—N/a			—N/a			—N/a			Did not exist		
17–20 Oct	More in Common	2,084	17%	62%	–45	13%	55%	–42	—N/a			—N/a			—N/a			Did not exist		
12–13 Oct	YouGov	2,086	26%	67%	–41	27%	66%	–39	31%	60%	–29	38%	45%	–7	40%	42%	–2	Did not exist		
10–13 Oct	Ipsos	1,141	22%	54%	–32	22%	50%	–28	37%	42%	–5	23%	33%	–10	27%	33%	–6	Did not exist		
10–13 Oct	More in Common	2,004	20%	63%	–43	15%	51%	–36	—N/a			—N/a			—N/a			Did not exist		
3–6 Oct	More in Common	2,003	14%	67%	–53	14%	55%	–41	—N/a			—N/a			—N/a			Did not exist		
3–5 Oct	Freshwater Strategy	1,251	26%	58%	–32	25%	51%	–26	40%	39%	+1	28%	31%	–3	32%	29%	+3	Did not exist		
26–29 Sep	More in Common	2,012	17%	61%	–44	17%	49%	–32	—N/a			—N/a			—N/a			Did not exist		
19–22 Sep	More in Common	2,055	19%	58%	–39	16%	51%	–35	—N/a			—N/a			—N/a			Did not exist		
12–15 Sep	More in Common	2,037	18%	61%	–43	18%	49%	–31	—N/a			—N/a			—N/a			Did not exist		
5–9 Sep	Ipsos	2,272	22%	51%	–29	20%	50%	–30	33%	41%	–8	24%	31%	–7	27%	30%	–3	Did not exist		
5–8 Sep	More in Common	2,106	18%	63%	–45	14%	51%	–37	—N/a			—N/a			—N/a			Did not exist		
2 Sep	Zack Polanski is elected Leader of the Green Party of England and Wales																	Did not exist		
28 Aug – 1 Sep	More in Common	2,042	19%	59%	–40	16%	51%	–35	—N/a			—N/a			—N/a			Did not exist		
29–31 Aug	Freshwater Strategy	1,251	23%	55%	–32	26%	49%	–23	38%	39%	–1	29%	35%	–6	33%	28%	+5	Did not exist		
22–26 Aug	More in Common	2,032	20%	57%	–37	17%	49%	–32	—N/a			—N/a			—N/a			Did not exist		
15–18 Aug	Ipsos	1,135	25%	53%	–28	21%	51%	–30	34%	45%	–11	25%	33%	–8	30%	33%	–3	Did not exist		
14–15 Aug	YouGov	2,016	27%	64%	–37	26%	65%	–39	34%	58%	–24	40%	44%	–4	44%	39%	+5	Did not exist		
8–11 Aug	More in Common	2,015	22%	56%	–34	17%	47%	–30	—N/a			—N/a			—N/a			Did not exist		
1–3 Aug	More in Common	2,042	17%	62%	–45	15%	51%	–36	—N/a			—N/a			—N/a			Did not exist		
1–3 Aug	Freshwater Strategy	1,259	27%	55%	–28	27%	47%	–20	39%	36%	+3	28%	31%	–3	30%	31%	–1	Did not exist		
26–28 Jul	More in Common	2,040	20%	58%	–38	15%	53%	–38	—N/a			—N/a			—N/a			Did not exist		
18–20 Jul	More in Common	2,153	17%	61%	–44	14%	50%	–35	—N/a			—N/a			—N/a			Did not exist		
13–14 Jul	YouGov	2,285	26%	65%	–39	21%	69%	–48	32%	57%	–25	37%	44%	–7	40%	40%	0	Did not exist		
11–14 Jul	Ipsos	1,144	24%	53%	–29	21%	52%	–31	32%	44%	–12	24%	35%	–11	26%	35%	–9	Did not exist		
11–14 Jul	More in Common	3,026	19%	58%	–39	16%	50%	–34	—N/a			—N/a			—N/a			Did not exist		
4–7 Jul	More in Common	2,084	19%	56%	–37	13%	49%	–36	—N/a			—N/a			—N/a			Did not exist		
4–6 Jul	Freshwater Strategy	1,259	27%	53%	–26	26%	50%	–24	37%	41%	–4	30%	31%	–1	29%	30%	–1	Did not exist		
2–3 Jul	More in Common	1,855	16%	59%	–43	17%	43%	–26	—N/a			—N/a			—N/a			Did not exist		
27–30 Jun	More in Common	2,532	22%	55%	–33	15%	51%	–36	—N/a			—N/a			—N/a			Did not exist		
25–27 Jun	Survation	2,002	35%	45%	–10	36%	39%	–3	37%	38%	–1	33%	26%	+7	31%	30%	+1	Did not exist		
20–23 Jun	More in Common	2,004	21%	54%	–33	14%	52%	–38	—N/a			—N/a			—N/a			Did not exist		
15–16 Jun	YouGov	2,220	31%	61%	–30	23%	67%	–44	33%	57%	–24	40%	42%	–2	41%	41%	0	Did not exist		
13–16 Jun	Ipsos	1,135	27%	52%	–25	21%	54%	–33	33%	45%	–12	26%	36%	–10	28%	33%	–5	Did not exist		
13–16 Jun	More in Common	2,032	21%	56%	–35	14%	52%	–38	—N/a			—N/a			—N/a			Did not exist		
10–11 Jun	Survation	2,010	35%	46%	–11	37%	39%	–2	39%	36%	+3	34%	32%	+2	31%	34%	–3	Did not exist		
6–9 Jun	More in Common	2,073	18%	57%	–39	13%	53%	–40	—N/a			—N/a			—N/a			Did not exist		
6–8 Jun	Freshwater Strategy	1,260	26%	55%	–29	26%	50%	–24	40%	39%	+1	33%	28%	+5	37%	27%	+10	Did not exist		
30 May – 2 Jun	Survation	1,096	33%	45%	–12	35%	40%	–5	40%	35%	+6	34%	28%	+6	31%	29%	+2	Did not exist		
30 May – 2 Jun	More in Common	2,016	21%	54%	–33	14%	53%	–39	—N/a			—N/a			—N/a			Did not exist		
16–19 May	More in Common	2,090	18%	60%	–42	15%	52%	–37	—N/a			—N/a			—N/a			Did not exist		
13–14 May	YouGov	2,171	26%	65%	–39	21%	69%	–48	35%	54%	–19	38%	43%	–5	40%	41%	–1	Did not exist		
9–13 May	Ipsos	2,284	27%	50%	–23	20%	56%	–36	32%	46%	–14	29%	34%	–5	31%	30%	+1	Did not exist		
10–12 May	More in Common	2,094	21%	55%	–34	14%	51%	–37	—N/a			—N/a			—N/a			Did not exist		
3–4 May	More in Common	2,212	19%	58%	–39	14%	52%	–38	—N/a			—N/a			—N/a			Did not exist		
25–27 Apr	More in Common	2,009	23%	55%	–32	17%	46%	–29	—N/a			—N/a			—N/a			Did not exist		
17–21 Apr	More in Common	2,004	21%	56%	–35	14%	51%	–37	—N/a			—N/a			—N/a			Did not exist		
13–14 Apr	YouGov	2,162	29%	61%	–32	24%	67%	–43	28%	60%	–32	36%	46%	–10	41%	41%	0	Did not exist		
11–14 Apr	More in Common	2,277	20%	54%	–34	17%	49%	–32	—N/a			—N/a			—N/a			Did not exist		
4–7 Apr	More in Common	2,058	19%	56%	–37	16%	46%	–30	—N/a			—N/a			—N/a			Did not exist		
28–31 Mar	More in Common	2,081	19%	60%	–41	16%	45%	–29	—N/a			—N/a			—N/a			Did not exist		
22–24 Mar	More in Common	2,077	21%	57%	–36	16%	49%	–33	—N/a			—N/a			—N/a			Did not exist		
16–17 Mar	YouGov	2,081	32%	59%	–27	25%	66%	–41	28%	59%	–31	36%	46%	–10	42%	40%	+2	Did not exist		
14–17 Mar	Ipsos	1,132	29%	46%	–17	23%	50%	–27	28%	48%	–20	24%	35%	–11	25%	33%	–8	Did not exist		
14–17 Mar	More in Common	2,432	26%	53%	–27	16%	47%	–31	—N/a			—N/a			—N/a			Did not exist		
10–11 Mar	YouGov	2,076	31%	61%	–30	25%	67%	–42	28%	59%	–31	38%	43%	–5	39%	41%	–2	Did not exist		
7–10 Mar	More in Common	2,041	22%	52%	–30	15%	49%	–34	—N/a			—N/a			—N/a			Did not exist		
4–5 Mar	YouGov	2,147	32%	60%	–28	24%	68%	–44	28%	61%	–33	37%	45%	–8	40%	41%	–1	Did not exist		
28 Feb – 3 Mar	More in Common	2,010	21%	53%	–32	—N/a			—N/a			—N/a			—N/a			Did not exist		
21–24 Feb	More in Common	2,013	18%	57%	–39	—N/a			—N/a			—N/a			—N/a			Did not exist		
14–18 Feb	More in Common	4,101	18%	58%	–40	14%	50%	–36	—N/a			—N/a			—N/a			Did not exist		
16–17 Feb	YouGov	2,436	29%	64%	–35	24%	68%	–44	32%	56%	–24	34%	45%	–11	41%	38%	+3	Did not exist		
7–11 Feb	Ipsos	2,248	24%	52%	–28	19%	53%	–34	30%	44%	–14	23%	35%	–12	27%	32%	–4	Did not exist		
7–10 Feb	More in Common	2,005	21%	57%	–36	16%	51%	–35	—N/a			—N/a			—N/a			Did not exist		
31 Jan – 3 Feb	More in Common	2,044	20%	53%	–33	16%	46%	–30	—N/a			—N/a			—N/a			Did not exist		
28–29 Jan	Survation	2,010	34%	47%	–13	34%	44%	–10	33%	41%	–8	29%	31%	–2	32%	33%	–1	Did not exist		
24–27 Jan	More in Common	2,009	17%	53%	–36	15%	49%	–34	—N/a			—N/a			—N/a			Did not exist		
17–20 Jan	More in Common	2,016	21%	56%	–35	16%	49%	–33	—N/a			—N/a			—N/a			Did not exist		
10–13 Jan	Ipsos	1,139	29%	50%	–21	20%	57%	–37	27%	49%	–22	26%	30%	–4	28%	29%	–1	Did not exist		
10–13 Jan	More in Common	2,102	18%	58%	–40	14%	50%	–36	—N/a			—N/a			—N/a			Did not exist		

=== 2024 ===
Date(s) conducted	Pollster	Sample size	Labour			Conservative			Reform			Lib Dems			Green		
Date(s) conducted	Pollster	Sample size	Pos.	Neg.	Net	Pos.	Neg.	Net	Pos.	Neg.	Net	Pos.	Neg.	Net	Pos.	Neg.	Net
12–16 Dec	Survation	2,030	34%	44%	–10	36%	41%	–5	34%	38%	–4	28%	29%	–1	28%	33%	–5
12–13 Dec	YouGov	2,215	28%	63%	–35	24%	67%	–43	27%	59%	–32	—N/a			—N/a		
6–10 Dec	More in Common	2,432	20%	56%	–35	18%	46%	–28	—N/a			—N/a			—N/a		
26–27 Nov	More in Common	1,972	21%	56%	–35	17%	50%	–33	—N/a			—N/a			—N/a		
8–11 Nov	More in Common	2,011	21%	47%	–26	16%	43%	–27	—N/a			17%	23%	–6	—N/a		
8–10 Nov	YouGov	2,099	33%	58%	–25	24%	66%	–32	29%	58%	–29	38%	42%	–4	39%	40%	–1
2 Nov	Kemi Badenoch is elected leader of the Conservative Party																
9–10 Oct	More in Common	2,072	21%	54%	–33	15%	52%	–36	—N/a			—N/a			—N/a		
5–7 Oct	More in Common	2,023 (Note: All of the sample was asked about their approval of the Conservative Party. Half of the sample (1,012) was asked about their approval of the Labour Party; half of the sample (1,011) were asked about their approval of the government.)	24%	51%	–27	15%	53%	–38	—N/a			—N/a			—N/a		
4–6 Oct	YouGov	2,121	31%	60%	–29	25%	65%	–40	26%	59%	–33	38%	42%	–4	41%	39%	+2
24–25 Sep	More in Common	2,080	22%	50%	–27	17%	51%	–34	—N/a			—N/a			—N/a		
20–22 Sep	YouGov	2,132	32%	59%	–27	24%	67%	–43	26%	62%	–36	37%	45%	–8	40%	42%	–2
7–9 Sep	More in Common	2,024	26%	45%	–19	15%	56%	–40	23%	38%	–15	19%	28%	–9	21%	24%	–2
24–27 Aug	More in Common	2,015	25%	46%	–20	15%	58%	–42	—N/a			—N/a			—N/a		
5–6 Aug	YouGov	2,163	39%	53%	–14	23%	70%	–47	—N/a			—N/a			—N/a		
5–8 Jul	YouGov	2,102	47%	46%	+1	21%	72%	–51	28%	62%	–34	45%	37%	+8	46%	38%	+8
5–6 Jul	Ipsos	1,141	40%	34%	+6	20%	59%	–39	25%	51%	–26	29%	28%	+1	33%	28%	+6

== Approval of Keir Starmer ==
Graphical summary of approval polls

== Hypothetical leaders ==
=== Different Labour leaders ===
These polls were conducted prior to Andy Burnham's election as leader of the Labour Party on 17 July 2026 and appointment as Prime Minister on 20 July 2026.

Date(s) conducted	Pollster	Sample size	Andy Burnham			Angela Rayner			David Lammy			Ed Miliband			Shabana Mahmood			Wes Streeting			Yvette Cooper		
Date(s) conducted	Pollster	Sample size	Pos.	Neg.	Net	Pos.	Neg.	Net	Pos.	Neg.	Net	Pos.	Neg.	Net	Pos.	Neg.	Net	Pos.	Neg.	Net	Pos.	Neg.	Net
17–20 Jul 2026	Andy Burnham is elected leader of the Labour Party and appointed Prime Minister three days later																						
12–13 Jul 2026	YouGov	2,104	21%	33%	–12	—N/a			—N/a			—N/a			—N/a			—N/a			—N/a		
26–29 Jun 2026	Public First (Note: Respondents were asked whether the politician is/would be a good or bad leader.)	2,013	40%	20%	+19	—N/a			—N/a			—N/a			—N/a			—N/a			—N/a		
26–28 Jun 2026	More in Common (Note: Respondents were asked whether Andy Burnham would do a good job as prime minister.)	2,852	27%	25%	+2	—N/a			—N/a			—N/a			—N/a			—N/a			—N/a		
22 Jun 2026	Keir Starmer announces his resignation as leader of the Labour Party and Prime Minister																						
18 Jun 2026	Makerfield by-election. Andy Burnham is elected as MP																						
21–22 Apr 2026	YouGov	2,080	26%	19%	+7	13%	44%	–28	2%	42%	–40	10%	42%	–32	4%	33%	–29	8%	31%	–23	8%	33%	–25

=== Your Party leaders prior to formation ===
Date(s) conducted	Pollster	Sample size	Jeremy Corbyn (Note: Since the announcement by Jeremy Corbyn and Zarah Sultana of a new political party, called Your Party, in July 2025, they and the party have been included by some pollsters in their leadership and party approval polls, although the party subsequently adopted a collective leadership model at its founding conference in November 2025.)			Zarah Sultana		
Date(s) conducted	Pollster	Sample size	Pos.	Neg.	Net	Pos.	Neg.	Net
29–30 Nov 2025	Your Party hosts its founding conference, formally adopting 'Your Party' as its name and agreeing a collective leadership model							
28–30 Nov 2025	Freshwater Strategy	1,558	21%	54%	–33	12%	26%	–14
26–28 Nov 2025	Focaldata	1,343	14%	56%	–42	—N/a		
18–21 Nov 2025	Focaldata	1,725	17%	54%	–37	—N/a		
16–17 Nov 2025	YouGov	2,112	23%	63%	–40	11%	30%	–19
7–9 Nov 2025	Freshwater Strategy	1,250	24%	52%	–28	12%	23%	–11
8–17 Oct 2025	Focaldata	2,057	18%	51%	–33	—N/a		
13–14 Oct 2025	YouGov	2,150	25%	63%	–38	12%	29%	–17
3–5 Oct 2025	Freshwater Strategy	1,251	19%	53%	–34	11%	27%	–16
19 Sep – 1 Oct 2025	Focaldata	2,014	18%	53%	–35	—N/a		
28–29 Sep 2025	YouGov	2,353	22%	64%	–42	13%	32%	–19
10–11 Sep 2025	YouGov	2,287	28%	59%	–31	13%	26%	–13
5–9 Sep 2025	Ipsos	2,272	23%	50%	–27	15%	36%	–21
29–31 Aug 2025	Freshwater Strategy	1,251	24%	51%	–27	14%	21%	–7
15–19 Aug 2025	Focaldata	1,500	20%	49%	–29	—N/a		
15–18 Aug 2025	Ipsos	1,135	20%	51%	–31	15%	41%	–26
14–15 Aug 2025	YouGov	2,016	26%	61%	–35	14%	26%	–12

=== Rupert Lowe prior to Restore Britain's registration ===
Date(s) conducted	Pollster	Sample size	Rupert Lowe		
Date(s) conducted	Pollster	Sample size	Pos.	Neg.	Net
20 Mar 2026	Restore Britain is registered with the Electoral Commission				
18–19 Mar 2026	YouGov	2,134	14%	27%	–13

== Hypothetical party approval polling ==
=== Your Party prior to formation ===
Date(s) conducted	Pollster	Sample size	Your Party		
Date(s) conducted	Pollster	Sample size	Pos.	Neg.	Net
29–30 Nov 2025	Your Party hosts its founding conference, formally adopting 'Your Party' as its name and agreeing a collective leadership model				
28–30 Nov 2025	Freshwater Strategy (Note: Framed as "Your Party")	1,558	30%	19%	+11
7–10 Nov 2025	Ipsos	1,133	17%	51%	–34
7–9 Nov 2025	Freshwater Strategy	1,250	34%	14%	+20
10–13 Oct 2025	Ipsos	1,141	14%	53%	–39
3–5 Oct 2025	Freshwater Strategy	1,251	30%	15%	+15
5–9 Sep 2025	Ipsos	2,272	17%	46%	–29
29–31 Aug 2025	Freshwater Strategy	1,251	33%	10%	+23
15–18 Aug 2025	Ipsos	1,135	17%	49%	–32

=== Restore Britain prior to registration ===
Date(s) conducted	Pollster	Sample size	Restore Britain		
Date(s) conducted	Pollster	Sample size	Pos.	Neg.	Net
20 Mar 2026	Restore Britain is registered with the Electoral Commission				
27 Feb – 1 Mar 2026	Freshwater Strategy	1,221	24%	21%	+3

== Approval of other politicians ==
=== Andy Burnham prior to election as Labour Party leader ===
Date(s) conducted	Pollster	Sample size	Andy Burnham		
Date(s) conducted	Pollster	Sample size	Pos.	Neg.	Net
17–20 Jul 2026	Andy Burnham is elected leader of the Labour Party and appointed Prime Minister three days later				
15–17 Jul 2026	Opinium	2,050	27%	31%	–4
12–13 Jul 2026	YouGov	2,104	34%	43%	–9
10–13 Jul 2026	More in Common	2,198	26%	23%	+3
10–12 Jul 2026	Convergent Opinion	2,498	37%	42%	–5
7–10 Jul 2026	Opinium	2,050	24%	32%	–8
7–9 Jul 2026	Survation	2,058	40%	41%	–1
3–6 Jul 2026	More in Common	2,119	26%	24%	+2
3–5 Jul 2026	Freshwater Strategy	1,240	33%	33%	0
1–3 Jul 2026	Opinium	2,050	23%	31%	–7
26–29 Jun 2026	Public First	2,013	34%	32%	+2
26–29 Jun 2026	More in Common	2,852	26%	21%	+5
25–29 Jun 2026	Survation	2,041	29%	29%	0
25–29 Jun 2026	Lord Ashcroft Polls	5,064	27%	36%	–9
26–28 Jun 2026	More in Common	2,852	27%	28%	0
24–25 Jun 2026	YouGov	2,075	32%	43%	–11
22 Jun 2026	Keir Starmer announces his resignation as leader of the Labour Party and Prime Minister				
21–22 Jun 2026	YouGov	2,110	34%	38%	–4
19–22 Jun 2026	More in Common	2,993	29%	28%	+1
18 Jun 2026	Makerfield by-election. Andy Burnham is elected as MP				
14–15 Jun 2026	YouGov	2,099	30%	41%	–11
5–9 Jun 2026	Ipsos	2,247	26%	33%	–7
7–8 Jun 2026	YouGov	2,038	29%	40%	–11
3–4 Jun 2026	YouGov	2,065	31%	41%	–10
29–31 May 2026	Freshwater Strategy	1,237	27%	27%	0
28–29 May 2026	YouGov	2,160	32%	41%	–9
26–28 May 2026	BMG Research	1,511	30%	28%	+2
21–22 May 2026	YouGov	2,060	33%	35%	–2
17–18 May 2026	YouGov	2,122	34%	35%	–1
12–13 May 2026	YouGov	2,078	36%	27%	+9
8–12 May 2026	Ipsos	2,191	32%	24%	+8
10–11 May 2026	YouGov	2,101	34%	29%	+5
9–10 May 2026	Freshwater Strategy	1,243	29%	19%	+10
7–8 May 2026	YouGov	2,068	32%	31%	+1
6–7 May 2026	YouGov	2,057	34%	30%	+4
5–6 May 2026	YouGov	2,167	33%	31%	+2
4–5 May 2026	YouGov	2,147	34%	30%	+4
30 Apr – 1 May 2026	YouGov	2,060	36%	29%	+7
28–29 Apr 2026	YouGov	2,063	34%	30%	+4
26–27 Apr 2026	YouGov	2,113	36%	28%	+8
23–24 Apr 2026	YouGov	2,076	34%	27%	+7
21–22 Apr 2026	YouGov	2,080	26%	19%	+7
20–21 Apr 2026	YouGov	2,056	36%	27%	+9
17–21 Apr 2026	Ipsos	2,262	30%	24%	+6
15–16 Apr 2026	YouGov	2,092	33%	30%	+3
14–15 Apr 2026	YouGov	2,151	32%	28%	+4
10–12 Apr 2026	Freshwater Strategy	1,250	26%	20%	+6
20–24 Mar 2026	Ipsos	2,283	31%	24%	+7
27 Feb – 1 Mar 2026	Freshwater Strategy	1,221	28%	21%	+7
10–11 Feb 2026	YouGov	2,088	35%	30%	+5
6–10 Feb 2026	Ipsos	1,119	30%	24%	+6
30 Jan – 1 Feb 2026	Freshwater Strategy	1,250	28%	21%	+7
25–26 Jan 2026	YouGov	2,183	34%	26%	+8
10–13 Jan 2026	More in Common	2,036	22%	20%	+2
9–11 Jan 2026	Freshwater Strategy	1,250	26%	21%	+5
2–5 Jan 2026	More in Common	2,016	26%	22%	+4
14–15 Dec 2025	YouGov	2,084	29%	29%	0
28 Nov – 2 Dec 2025	Ipsos	1,124	30%	26%	+4
28–30 Nov 2025	Freshwater Strategy	1,558	27%	22%	+5
7–9 Nov 2025	Freshwater Strategy	1,250	27%	18%	+9
13–14 Oct 2025	YouGov	2,150	30%	28%	+2
10–13 Oct 2025	Ipsos	1,141	31%	24%	+7
3–5 Oct 2025	Freshwater Strategy	1,251	28%	22%	+6
19 Sep – 1 Oct 2025	Focaldata	2,014	21%	26%	–5
28–29 Sep 2025	YouGov	2,353	31%	31%	0
24–26 Sep 2025	Opinium	2,050	27%	17%	+10
5–9 Sep 2025	Ipsos	2,272	29%	20%	+9

== See also ==
- Opinion polling for the next United Kingdom general election
- Leadership approval opinion polling for the 2024 United Kingdom general election
- Preferred prime minister opinion polling for the next United Kingdom general election
