= Margaret Wright (British politician) =

British politician (1940–2012)

Margaret Elizabeth Wright

Principal Speaker of the Green Party
- In office 1999–2003
- Preceded by: Jean Lambert
- Succeeded by: Caroline Lucas

Cambridge City Councillor for Abbey Ward
- In office 1 May 2008 – 3 May 2012
- Preceded by: John Durrant
- Succeeded by: Richard Johnson

Personal details
- Born: 20 February 1940 Newcastle-upon-Tyne, England
- Died: 22 June 2012 (aged 72) Cambridge, England
- Party: Green Party of England and Wales
- Education: University of Oxford

Margaret Elizabeth Wright (20 February 1940 – 22 June 2012) was a Green Party politician and from 2008 to 2012 a city councillor for Abbey Ward on Cambridge City Council in England. She was one of the Principal Speakers of the Green Party, a post she held with Darren Johnson, from 1999 to 2003.

She was several times elected by the Eastern Region of the Green Party to the first place on their list for the European Parliament.

Wright was born in Newcastle-upon-Tyne, then studied history at Bedford College, London, and teaching at the University of Oxford. Later in life, she also obtained a master's degree in art history from Birkbeck College. She moved to Cambridge with her three children and joined the Ecology Party in 1979, this later becoming the Green Party.

Margaret Wright contested the Cambridge constituency for the Green Party in both 1987 (the first time the Greens contested the seat) and 1997, gaining 1.1% and 1.3% respectively. She was Press Officer for Cambridge Green Party, and also served on the national executive of the Green Party, relating to international issues, and, fluent in French and German, the International Committee.

Political offices
Preceded by Jean Lambert	Principal Speaker of the Green Party of England and Wales; 1999–2003	Succeeded by Caroline Lucas
