= Peg Alexander =

Broadcaster, journalist and former British politician

Peg Alexndar

Principal Speaker of the Green Party
- In office 1995–1997 Serving with David Taylor
- Preceded by: Jan Clark
- Succeeded by: Jean Lambert
- Website: www.pegalexander.com

Peg Alexander is a journalist, broadcaster, and former politician in the United Kingdom.

She reports regularly on BBC local radio, appears on Jeremy Vine on Channel 5 and Steph’s Packed Lunch on Channel 4, and presents on BCB Radio in Bradford. She was the politics and current affairs presenter on the MADE TV Network for over 3 years. She also hosts a number of lifestyle and human interest podcasts.

== Life and career ==
Born Margaret Victoria Nuttgens, she is the daugher of the late architect and broadcaster, and educationalist Patrick Nuttgens.

Between 1994 and 1996, Alexander worked as the co-ordinator of the National Group on Homeworking, a campaigning organisation working to improve the pay and rights of home-based industrial piece workers.

From 1995 until 1997, she served as Principal Speaker of the Green Party of England and Wales, alongside David Taylor. She called for the party to fill the "space left by the new-look Labour Party". Alexander stood for the party in the 1996 Hemsworth by-election, taking 157 votes (0.7%) and finishing seventh of ten candidates. She was first on the party's list for Yorkshire and the Humber at the European Parliament election in 1999. Although the list took 5.7% of the vote, she again failed to be elected. She held other national positions within the Green Party of the United Kingdom, including Finance and Management Coordinator on the party Executive, where she held responsibility for finances and staffing.

After the European Election in 1999, she decided to concentrate her efforts on her work in the public and third sectors. She was the Chief Executive of affairs uk/ Wakefield’s Council for Voluntary Service between 2001 and 2004 ran Smile Consultancy her own management consultancy company, until 2006 when she went to work for the Children’s Workforce Development Network Council, a government agency. Here she held positions of national lead on the Third Sector, then Head of Regional support where she oversaw CWDC’s support to England’s Children’s Trusts. In 2009 she took up post as the first Director of Bradford’s status as the world’s first official Bradford City of Film.

Since 2010, she has been a broadcaster, initially on Bradford's community radio station BCB 106.6, a broadcast journalist on BBC radio stations, and the current affairs and politics presenter on TV station Made in Leeds.

Party political offices
Preceded by Jan Clark	Principal Speaker of the Green Party of England and Wales; 1995–1997	Succeeded by Jean Lambert
