= Jean Lambert =

British politician (born 1950)

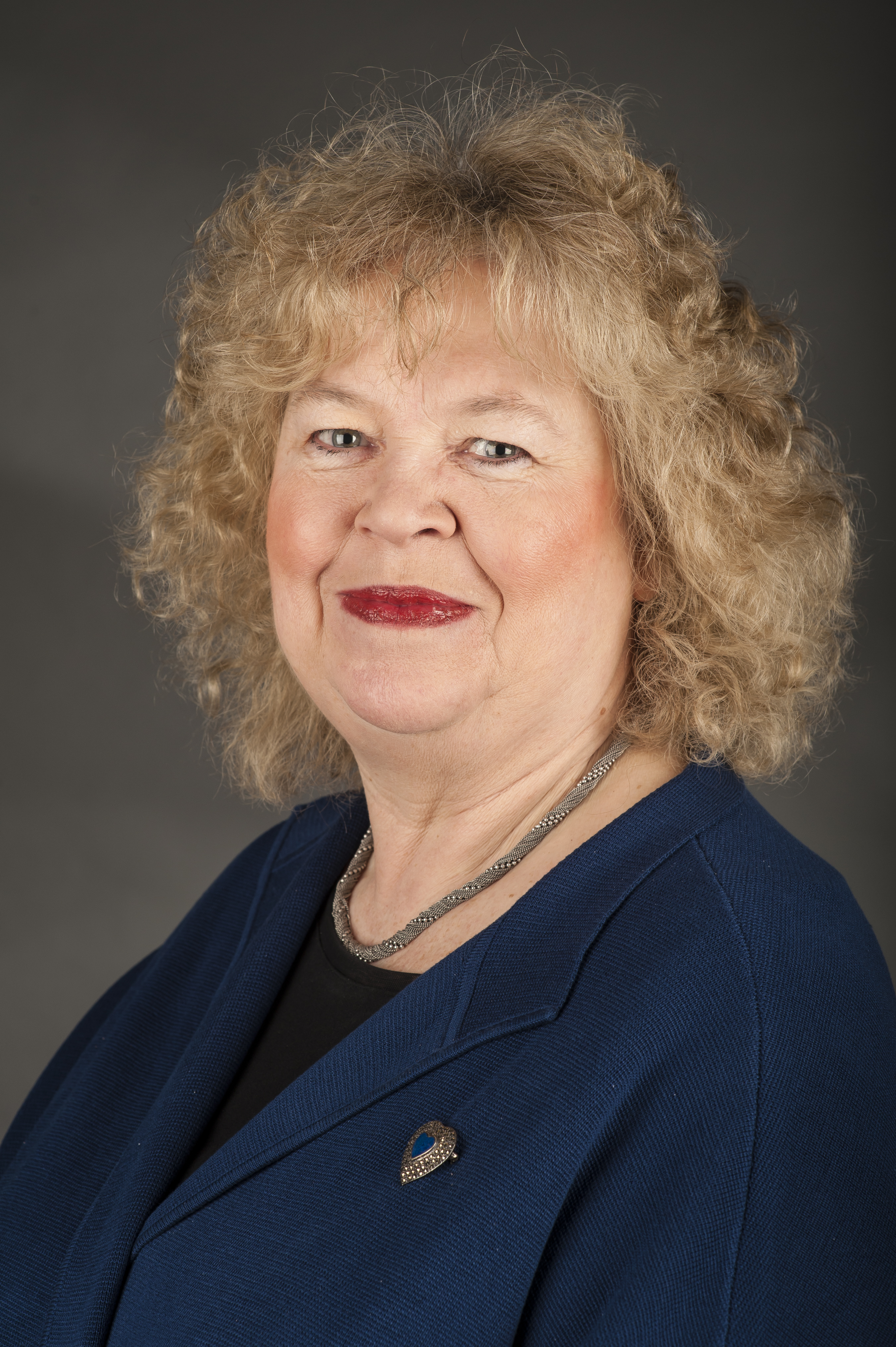

Principal Speaker of the Green Party
- In office 1998–1999 Serving with Mike Woodin
- Preceded by: Peg Alexander
- Succeeded by: Margaret Wright
- In office 1992–1993 Serving with Richard Lawson (1992); Mallen Baker (1992-1993)
- Preceded by: Office created
- Succeeded by: Jan Clark

Member of the European Parliament for London
- In office 10 June 1999 – 1 July 2019
- Preceded by: Position established
- Succeeded by: Scott Ainslie

Personal details
- Born: Jean Denise Archer; 1 June 1950 (age 76) Orsett, Essex, England
- Party: Green Party of England and Wales
- Education: Cardiff University
- Profession: Teacher
- Website: http://www.jeanlambert.org/

Jean Denise Lambert (born Jean Denise Archer; 1 June 1950 in Orsett, Essex) is an English politician who served as a Member of the European Parliament for the London Region between 1999 and 2019.

== Early life and career ==
She attended Palmer's Grammar School for Girls in Grays, Essex. Lambert gained a BA in Modern Languages in 1971 from University College, Cardiff, before taking a Postgraduate Certificate in Education (PGCE) from St Pauls' College (Francis Close Hall), Cheltenham (now the University of Gloucestershire) and gaining an ADB (Ed.) in 1975. She then worked as a secondary school teacher in Waltham Forest, East London, from 1972 to 1978, then from 1985 to 1989 and between 1993 and 1999. She holds a Professional Development Certificate (BTEC), which she achieved in 1998.

== Political career ==
=== Green Party politician and MEP ===
After joining the Ecology Party in 1977 (later becoming the Green Party of England and Wales), Lambert has held numerous positions, including Co-Chair of the Party Council (1982–85), Principal Speaker (1992–93 and 1998–99), Chair of the Party Executive (1993–94), Representative to the Federation of European Green Parties (1987–89 and 1998–99) and Political Liaison to the Green Group in the European Parliament (1989–92). She is currently the party's spokesperson on Migration.

Lambert was first elected to the European Parliament in 1999 from the London Region, winning 87,545 votes (7.7% share). She was re-elected in 2004 with 8.4% of the vote (158,986 votes) and again in 2009 with 10.9% of the vote (190,589 votes), and again in 2014. As a Member of the European Parliament, she was a member or substitute of the Employment and Social Affairs Committee, the Civil Liberties, Justice and Home Affairs Committee, the Subcommittee on Human Rights, the Intergroup on Disability and Gay and Lesbian Rights and Delegations to South Asia, Afghanistan, Japan and India. She chaired the South Asia Delegation from 2009–2019. She was Vice-President of the Intergroup on Ageing, the Intergroup on Anti-poverty and the Intergroup on Anti-racism and Diversity. She was Rapporteur on the Parliament's Asylum Report. She was Vice-President of the Greens/European Free Alliance Group of MEPs from 2002 to 2007, in which she was the Spokesperson on Asylum and Refugees. Lambert was also engaged in EU Election Observation missions, including as Chief Observer for the 2018 elections in Sierra Leone.

She is an active campaigner for the London Living Wage.

=== Non-party activism and advisory roles ===
Outside her work in the Green Party, Lambert is involved in numerous NGOs. Since 1991, she has been a Council Member of Charter 88, the democratic reform NGO, as well as an Executive Supporter and Signatory for Charter 99, described as "an initiative for global democracy". She has been Vice-President of the Waltham Forest Race Equality Council from 1999. She is a Trustee of the Dalit Solidarity Campaign UK. She is also on Advisory Boards of the Work-Life Institute and London Metropolitan University.

=== Awards ===
Lambert was named Justice and Human Rights MEP of the Year 2005, the first year these awards were held.

== Writings ==
Lambert has written numerous reports and articles on her areas of interest, especially democracy and human rights, sustainable development, anti-discrimination, social inclusion, minority rights, trade union and workers' issues and asylum and refugee rights. She wrote No Change? No Chance, a book on Green politics, in 1996. Furthermore, she has made a film in 2006, EU4U! Your voice can make a difference!, highlighting the ways young people can make a difference within EU structures.

== Bibliography, reports, briefings and films ==
- Film – EU4U! Your voice can make a difference!, 2006
- Lambert, J., Climate Change, Climate Crisis?, 2007
- Lambert, J., Lucas, C. P., European Parliament two-seat operation: Environmental costs, transport and energy, 2007
- Lambert, J., Hothouses: Climate Change and London's Housing, 2007
- Lambert, J., I Must Work Harder? Britain And The Working Time Directive, 2006
- Lambert, J., The Bolkestein Directive: Health Warning, 2005
- Lambert, J., So Much Hot Air?, 2005
- Green Group position on the services directive, 2005
- Lambert, J., Flexible Working: A Work Life Balance Or A Balancing Act?, 2004
- Lambert, J., What is Sustainable Development?, 2004
- Lambert, J., Integrating social inclusion and environment, 2003
- Jones, J., Lambert, J., Silent Slavery, 2003
- Lambert, J., Olivier, D., Toke, D., The Green Party Alternative Energy Review, 2003
- Lambert, J., General Agreement To Trade In Services: Response to European Commission Consultation Document, 2003
- Lambert, J., General Agreement On Trade In Services: Response to UK Consultation on Requests, 2002
- Lambert, J., Toke, D., Energy and Renewables, 2002
- Lambert, J., Lucas, C. P., The World Summit On Sustainable Development 2002, 2002
- Greens EFA Briefing on GMOs, 2002
- Lambert, J., Refugees and The Environment: The Forgotten Element Of Sustainability, 2002
- Lambert, J., No Change? No Chance, 1996

Party political offices
Preceded by Gundula Dorey	Co-Chair of the Ecology Party; 1982–1985; With: Alec Pontin (1982–83); Jonathan Porritt (1982–84); Paul Ekins (1983–85)	Succeeded by Jo Robins, Heather Swailes and Lindy Williams
Preceded by Jo Robins, Heather Swailes and Lindy Williams	Co-Chair of the Green Party; 1986–1987; With: Jo Robins and Brig Oubridge)	Succeeded by Janet Alty, Tim Cooper and Brig Oubridge
Preceded by New position	Principal Speaker of the Green Party of England and Wales; 1992–93	Succeeded by Jan Clark
Preceded by John Norris	Chair of the Green Party of England and Wales; 1994	Succeeded by John Morrissey
Preceded by Peg Alexander	Principal Speaker of the Green Party of England and Wales; 1998–99	Succeeded by Margaret Wright
