= Mallen Baker =

British politician (born 1963)

Principal Speaker of the Green Party
- In office 1992–1993 Serving with Jean Lambert
- Preceded by: Richard Lawson
- Succeeded by: John Cornford

Personal details
- Born: 23 May 1963 (age 63)
- Party: Liberal Democrats (before 2002)
- Other political affiliations: Green Party of England and Wales (before 1993)

Mallen Baker (born 23 May 1963) is an English commentator on corporate social responsibility and a former politician who served as the male Principal Speaker for the Green Party of England and Wales from 1992–1993.

== Career ==
=== Political ===
Based in Sheffield, Baker worked as a freelance writer and became active in the Green Party of England and Wales. He served as co-chair of the party in 1990–1991 and as a party speaker. He co-wrote the party's document, The Green Budget, published in 1991.

At the 1992 general election, Baker stood in Sheffield Hallam; he took less than 1% of the vote and was not elected. During this period, he became the leading opponent of the Green 2000 campaign to change the party constitution. In August, he welcomed the resignation of Principal Speaker Sara Parkin, the leader of Green 2000 proposals. Following this, Baker was elected as Principal Speaker, serving for a year.

Soon after completing his term as Principal Speaker, Baker resigned from the Green Party and joined the Liberal Democrats. He became the editor of Challenge, the journal of the Green Liberal Democrats group. He retired from party politics, leaving the Liberal Democrats in 2002, and subsequently devoted his time to campaigning on corporate social responsibility, leading the Business in the Community charity and, subsequently his own Daisywheel Interactive agency, while writing for Ethical Corporation. Since 2019, he has primarily produced content for YouTube on current affairs and science topics.

Political offices
Preceded by Richard Lawson	Principal Speaker of the Green Party of England and Wales; 1992–1993	Succeeded by John Cornford
