= Richard Lawson (politician) =

Environmentalist and politician in England

Principal Speaker of the Green Party
- In office February 1992 – September 1992 Serving with Jean Lambert
- Preceded by: Office established
- Succeeded by: Mallen Baker

Personal details
- Born: 1946 (age 79–80)

Richard Lawson is an environmentalist and politician in England. He served as the male Principal Speaker for the Green Party of England and Wales from February–September 1992.

== Life and career ==
Born in 1946, Lawson became a doctor in 1969 and joined the Ecology Party, forerunner of the Green Party, in about 1977. In 1979, he joined a general practice in Congresbury, Somerset. He was elected to Woodspring District Council in 1986. At the 1987 general election he stood in Weston-super-Mare, taking 3.6% of the votes cast and finishing fourth of four candidates, and at the 1989 European Parliament election, he took 23% of the vote and second place in Somerset and Dorset West.

In 1983, Lawson and his medical partner called a village meeting to consider what the impact of a nuclear attack would be on their village. After describing the effects of radiation sickness that would be untreatable in a world where the production of water, food, energy, law and order and medicine would be gravely compromised, the villagers voted 62-16 to accept suicide pills from their GPs. The plans to provide these pills were interrupted by the General Medical Council, who indicated that they would not regard this favourably. However, the story was reported as far away as Australia and Japan.

In 1992, Lawson became Principal Speaker of the Green Party of England and Wales, alongside Jean Lambert. He stood again in Weston-super-Mare at the general election, but his share of the vote fell to 2.0% and he again finished last. Lawson later served as Health Speaker of the party.

In 1996 he authored Bills of Health, a study of the impact of political and economic conditions on the National Health Service (NHS).

He stood in Woodspring at the 1997 and 2001 general elections finishing fifth on both occasions with 1.2% and 2.6% of the vote respectively, and was second on the party's South West England list at the 1999 European election, but never came close to election. At the 2009 European election, he took the fourth place on the party's South West England list but was again unsuccessful.

Lawson stood for Parliament in Weston-super-Mare again in the 2015 general election, finishing fifth with 4.9% of the vote.

In his spare time, Lawson was previously a hang glider pilot, and invented a double film aerofoil sail. He also composes poetry and has led a campaign for the United Nations to compile a Global Index of Human Rights.

Political offices
New title	Principal Speaker of the Green Party of England and Wales; 1992	Succeeded by Mallen Baker
