= Leader of the Green Party of England and Wales =

Head of the Green Party in England and Wales

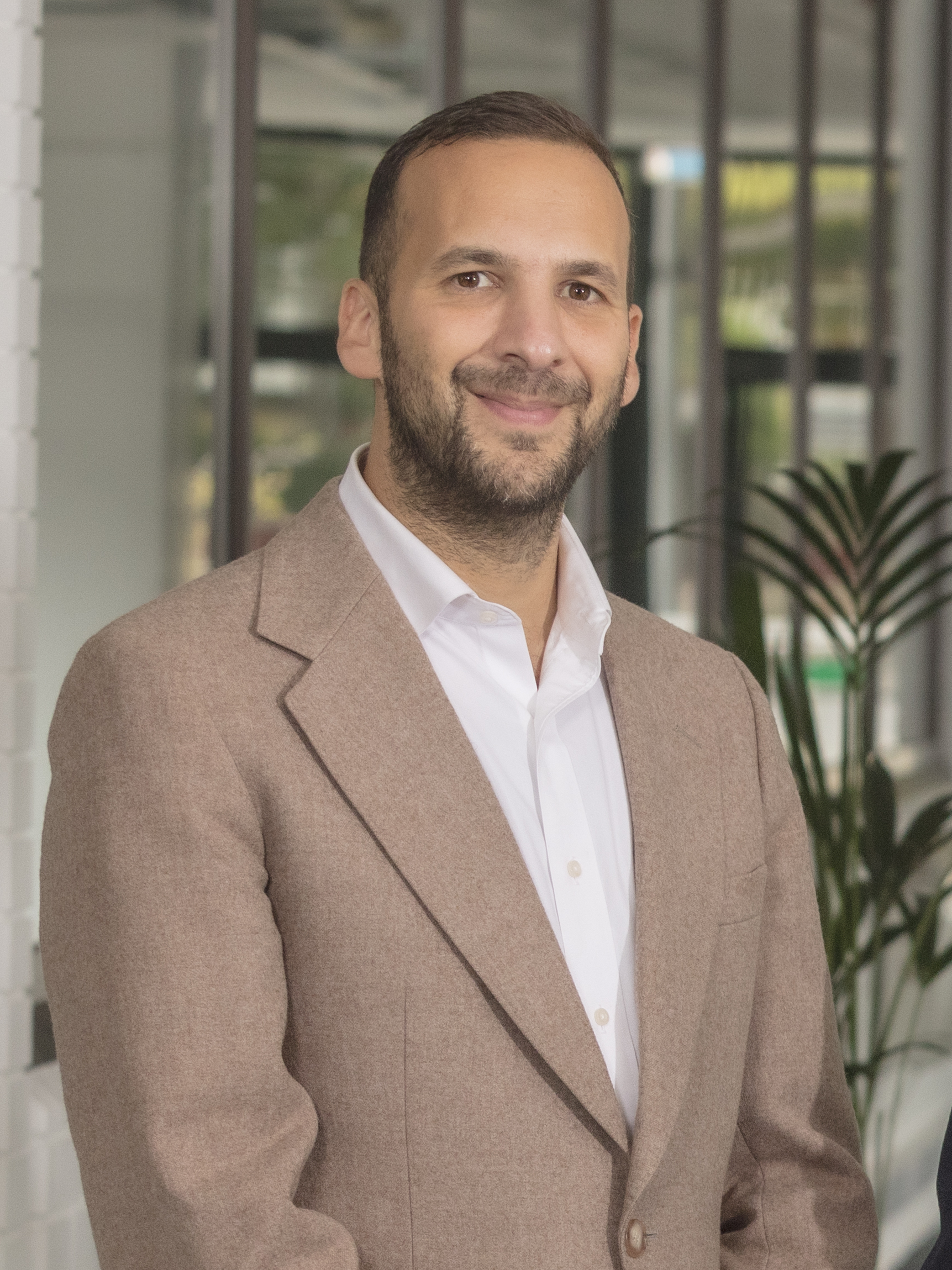
- Incumbent; Zack Polanski since 2 September 2025
- Appointer: Members of the Green Party of England and Wales; through leadership elections held biennially
- Term length: 2 years
- Precursor: Principal Speakers
- Formation: 5 September 2008
- First holder: Caroline Lucas
- Deputy: Rachel Millward; Mothin Ali

The Leader of the Green Party of England and Wales is the most senior political figure within the Green Party of England and Wales. The role was introduced alongside that of Deputy Leader in 2008. Prior to this, the party's public spokespersons were known as "principal speakers". There were two principal speakers, one female and one male, who were elected annually at the Green Party's Autumn Conference and held no vote on the Green Party Executive (GPEx).

A referendum passed on 30 November 2007 that abolished the posts of principal speakers and a leader and deputy were elected at the party's next autumn conference on 5 September 2008.

== Role and history ==
The principal speakers performed the public and media roles undertaken by the leaders of more conventional political parties. Green parties often consider joint leadership of this kind to embody the widely held Green beliefs in consensus decision making and gender balance. It also symbolises their belief in the need for a society in which people are empowered and involved in making the decisions which affect them. In the party's Philosophical Basis, it states that the Green Party "reject[s] the hierarchical structure of leaders and followers, and, instead advocate[s] participatory politics" and it is "for this reason" that the Green Party has eschewed an individual leader.

There were six principal speakers in the UK Green Party until 1991, when changes introduced by the Green 2000 grouping reduced this to two and streamlined the organisation of the party. This left a system with which neither side in the 2007 leadership referendum was happy.

=== 2007 Leadership referendum ===
At the party's 2007 spring conference in Swansea, members voted to hold a cross-party referendum on whether the posts should be changed to leader and deputy leader (with the option for co-leaders if two candidates chose to run together and were gender balanced, in the event of which there would be no deputy leader). The new system would allow the leader and deputy (or co-leaders) to vote on GPEx and, rather than being elected annually (like the principal speakers), the posts would be elected every two years. Provisions for recalling the leader and deputy were articulated. Despite the controversial nature of this issue, many participants, such as Siân Berry, were struck by the how "constructive" the debate turned out to be.

On Friday 30 November 2007 the ballots were counted and members voted 73% to 27% in favour of the new leadership model, with a 48.3% turnout of Green Party members.

==== The 'Pro-Leader' side – Green Yes ====
Supporters of the 'Green Yes' campaign for a yes vote in the referendum included the then-principal speaker Caroline Lucas MEP, Siân Berry, Darren Johnson AM (a Green member of the London Assembly), environmental commentator and Green member Mark Lynas, former principal speaker Jonathon Porritt, councillors from Lewisham, Brighton, Norwich, Leicester and Lancaster, and members of the Green Party Executive (GPEx), including Jim Killock (external communications officer), elections coordinator Peter Cranie and Khalid Hussenbux, the party's financial coordinator.

The Green Yes campaign believed that the Green Party needed a leader to reach its potential and that, if the party did not reach its potential, it would be "selling-short our planet and everything on it". They suggested that the party's success has been too slow and that "a leader would help set direction, political focus and make sure the party gets the resources to grow". The campaign hoped that having a Leader would be "about empowering the party" and "about accountability", in that a Leader would "mean we can identify who to hold to account when things need changing". The group added that other Green Parties in the world had leaders and remained "just as Green as the rest of us".

Mark Lynas, in several editions of his New Statesman blog, further claimed that the name 'Principal Speaker' was not transparent to the public, that it wasted valuable time in explaining the system to the media and that it lacked credibility. Darren Johnson characterised the lack of single leader as "just a ridiculous barrier in terms of getting our really important message across".

==== The 'Anti-Leader' side – Green Empowerment ====
Supporters of the 'Green Empowerment' campaign for a no vote in the leadership referendum included the then-Principal Speaker Derek Wall, Jenny Jones (a Green member of the London Assembly), Timothy Beaumont (Green member of the House of Lords), prominent human rights campaigner and Green member Peter Tatchell, Noel Lynch (London Green Party Coordinator and former London Assembly member), councillors from Scarborough, Lewisham, York, Norwich and Hackney, and members of the Green Party Executive (GPEx), including Campaigns Coordinator, Tim Summers, and Pete McAskie (Management Coordinator). Some members, like Matt Sellwood, while in favour of a Leader system in principle, were opposed to the current referendum because the term of reelection would be extended to two years.

Supporters of Green Empowerment wanted to "uphold the Green Party's long-standing commitment to non-hierarchical structures and 'grassroots' democracy" through "collective leadership". They believed that a single leader "would not only draw attention away from other speakers and the wider Party, but would bring with it risks that the other parties in this country are all too well aware of". The campaign focused on retaining gender balance in party structures, and avoiding the dilution of their radical policies. They focused on success under the Principal Speaker system, seen in the steady buildup of support from the low point of the 1992 general election to the situation at the time of the referendum, where the party has over 100 councilors along with two members of the European Parliament and two members of the London Assembly.

Derek Wall countered pro-leader arguments by stating that "if you are a clear speaker, there's no problem getting coverage and explaining the party's views." He was concerned by the history of past political parties that started off as being participatory until they adopted a single leader system in which the members became "puppets". Wall also opposed the reduction in numbers of Principal Speakers from six to two in 1992, as advocated by the Green 2000 group.

=== Party Leader era ===
In September 2008 Caroline Lucas was elected as the party's first leader. Lucas was reelected in 2010 but chose not to stand in 2012, when Natalie Bennett was elected her successor. After Bennett stood down in 2016 Lucas returned as leader, this time sharing the position with Jonathan Bartley.

In 2018, Siân Berry replaced Lucas as co-leader, with Bartley continuing in the role.

In July 2021, Bartley announced he would be standing down as the party's co-leader at the end of the month, triggering the 2021 Green Party of England and Wales leadership election. Berry remained as acting leader, but decided not to stand in the leadership election due to her concerns over the party's message on trans rights. In her statement, she cited unspecified spokesperson appointments as being inconsistent with her pledge to support trans equality.

== Leaders ==
=== Principal Speakers (1990–1992) ===
Prior to 1992 six principal speakers were elected annually.

- Sara Parkin
- Jim Berreen
- Andrew Simms
- Jean Lambert
- David Spaven
- Derek Wall

=== Principal Speakers (1992–2008) ===
Male principal speaker (Birth–Death)	Female principal speaker (Birth–Death)	Took office	Left office
Richard Lawson (1946–); Woodspring District Councillor for Congresbury Ward (1974–1992)	Jean Lambert (1950–)	February 1992	September 1992
Mallen Baker (1963–)	Jean Lambert (1950–)	1992	1993
John Cornford	Jan Clark Glanford Borough Councillor (1990–Unknown)	1993	1994
David Taylor (1957–)	Jan Clark Glanford Borough Councillor (1990–Unknown)	1994	1995
David Taylor (1957–)	Peg Alexander	1995	1996
David Taylor (1957–)	Peg Alexander	1996	1997
Mike Woodin (1965–2004); Oxford City Councillor for Carfax Ward (1994–2004)	-	1997	1998
Mike Woodin (1965–2004); Oxford City Councillor for Carfax Ward (1994–2004)	Jean Lambert (1950–)	1998	1999
Mike Woodin (1965–2004); Oxford City Councillor for Carfax Ward (1994–2004)	Margaret Wright	1999	2000
Mike Woodin (1965–2004); Oxford City Councillor for Carfax Ward (1994–2004)	Margaret Wright	2000	2001
Darren Johnson (1966–); Lewisham Borough Councillor for Brockley Ward (2002–2014)AM as an additional member (2000–2016)	Margaret Wright	2001	2002
Darren Johnson (1966–); Lewisham Borough Councillor for Brockley Ward (2002–2014)AM as an additional member (2000–2016)	Margaret Wright	2002	2003
Mike Woodin (1965–2004); Oxford City Councillor for Carfax Ward (1994–2004)	Caroline Lucas (1960–); MEP for South East England (1999–2010)	2003	2004
Keith Taylor Brighton and Hove City Councillor for St Peter's and North Laine Ward (1999–2010)	Caroline Lucas (1960–); MEP for South East England (1999–2010)	2004	2005
Keith Taylor Brighton and Hove City Councillor for St Peter's and North Laine Ward (1999–2010)	Caroline Lucas (1960–); MEP for South East England (1999–2010)	2005	2006
Derek Wall (1965–)	Siân Berry (1974–)	2006	2007
Derek Wall (1965–)	Caroline Lucas (1960–); MEP for South East England (1999–2010)	2007	2008

=== Party leadership (2008–present) ===
Leader (Birth–Death)		Took office	Left office	Election
Caroline Lucas (1960–); MEP for South East England (before 2010); MP for Brighton Pavilion (from 2010)		5 September 2008	3 September 2012	2008; 2010
Natalie Bennett (1966–)		3 September 2012	2 September 2016	2012; 2014
Caroline Lucas (1960–); MP for Brighton Pavilion	Jonathan Bartley (1971–); Member of Lambeth London Borough Council (2018–2022)	2 September 2016	4 September 2018	2016
Siân Berry (1974–); Member of the London Assembly	Jonathan Bartley (1971–); Member of Lambeth London Borough Council (2018–2022)	4 September 2018	31 July 2021	2018; 2020
Siân Berry served as Acting Leader during this interim, following the resignation of Jonathan Bartley.
Carla Denyer (1985–); MP for Bristol Central (from 2024)	Adrian Ramsay (1981–); MP for Waveney Valley (from 2024)	1 October 2021	2 September 2025	2021
Zack Polanski (1982–); Member of the London Assembly		2 September 2025	Incumbent	2025

=== Deputy Leadership (2008–present) ===
Deputy Leader (Birth–Death)		Took office	Left office	Election
Adrian Ramsay (1981–)		5 September 2008	3 September 2012	2008; 2010
Will Duckworth (1954–)		3 September 2012	1 September 2014	2012
Shahrar Ali	Amelia Womack (1985–)	1 September 2014	31 August 2016	2014
Amelia Womack (1985–)		31 August 2016	7 September 2022	2016; 2018; 2020
Zack Polanski (1982–)		7 September 2022	2 September 2025	2022
Mothin Ali (1982–)	Rachel Millward (1977–)	2 September 2025	Incumbent	2025

== Election results ==
=== 2025 ===
Candidate	Votes	%
Zack Polanski	20,411	84.6%
Adrian Ramsay and Ellie Chowns	3,705	15.4%
Re-open nominations	149	0.6%

=== 2021 ===
Candidate	1st round		2nd round	
Candidate	Votes	%	Votes	%
Carla Denyer and Adrian Ramsay	5,062	44	6,274	62
Tamsin Omond and Amelia Womack	3,465	30	3,902	38
Shahrar Ali	2,422	21		
Martin Hemingway and Tina Rothery	342	3		
Ashley Gunstock	212	2		
Re-open Nominations	22	0.2		

=== 2020 ===
Candidate	1st round		2nd round	
Candidate	Votes	%	Votes	%
Jonathan Bartley and Siân Berry	3,000	48.9%	4,238	57.5%
Rosi Sexton	1,978	26.9%	2,618	35.5%
Shahrar Ali	1,735	23.6%		
Re-open nominations	45	0.6%		

=== 2018 ===
Candidate	Votes	%
Jonathan Bartley and Siân Berry	6,329	75.5
Shahrar Ali	1,466	17.5
Leslie Rowe	495	5.9
Re-open Nominations	89	1.1

=== 2007 ===
Female Principal Speaker
Candidate	Votes	%
Caroline Lucas	1,190	78.0
Jenny Jones	335	22.0

Male Principal Speaker
Candidate	Votes	%
Derek Wall	752	49.6
Darren Johnson	625	41.3
Ashley Gunstock	138	9.1

=== 2006 ===
The Female Principal Speaker post was won by Siân Berry, without a contest.

Male Principal Speaker election
Candidate	Votes	%
Derek Wall	767	52.1
Keith Taylor	705	47.9

=== 2004 ===
The Female Principal Speaker post was won by Caroline Lucas, without a contest.

Male Principal Speaker election
Candidate	Votes	%
Keith Taylor		52
John Phillips		42

== Chairs ==
1990: Mallen Baker, John Laker and Judy Maciejowska
1991: John Laker, John Norris and Sara Parkin
1992: Sara Parkin
1993: John Norris
1994: Jean Lambert
1995: John Morrissey
1996: Jenny Jones
1998: Alan Francis
2000: Penny Kemp
2003: Hugo Charlton
2006: Richard Mallender
2008: James Humphreys
2009: Jayne Forbes
2011: Jo Steranka
2012: Tim Dawes
2014: Richard Mallender
2016: Clare Phipps
2018: Liz Reason
2022: Jon Nott

== Regional and national variations ==
The leader of the Wales Green Party is Anthony Slaughter, who was elected as the party's leader in December 2018. Some regional and local groups have adopted a gender balance principle and emulated the Principal Speaker structure, including the LSE Students' Union Green Party, who have a Female and Male Co-Chair.
