= Jan Clark =

British politician

Janet Clark is an environmentalist and politician in the United Kingdom.

Living in South Ferriby, North Lincolnshire, Clark worked as a deputy headteacher. In 1982, she joined the Ecology Party, following concerns about nitrate levels in drinking water. At the 1989 European election, she stood in Humberside, taking 14% of the votes cast.

In 1990, she became the renamed Green Party's first member of Glanford District Council. From 1993 until 1995, she served as a Principal Speaker of the Green Party of England and Wales.

Party political offices
Preceded by Jean Lambert	Principal Speaker of the Green Party of England and Wales; 1993–1995	Succeeded by Peg Alexander
