= Derek Wall =

British environmentalist (born 1965)

Principal Speaker of the Green Party
- In office 24 November 2006 – 5 September 2008 Serving with Siân Berry (2006–2007)
- Preceded by: Keith Taylor
- Succeeded by: Office Abolished

Personal details
- Born: 26 May 1965 (age 61)
- Party: Green Party of England and Wales
- Children: 3
- Education: University of London (BSc) University of the West of England (PHD)
- Profession: Economics lecturer

Derek Norman Wall (born 26 May 1965) is a British politician. He was the joint International Coordinator for the Green Party of England and Wales and stood against Prime Minister Theresa May as the Green candidate for Maidenhead at the 2017 general election.

Formerly the party's Principal Speaker, he is known as a prominent eco-socialist, campaigning both for environmentalism and socialism. Alongside his political role, Wall is an academic and a writer, having published on the subject of ecosocialism and the wider Green politics movement. He is a contributor to the Morning Star newspaper and a blogger.

== Biography ==
=== Early political activism ===
Wall first became involved in the Green movement in 1979. He joined the Ecology Party (later the Green Party of England and Wales) in 1980. By 1987, Wall was standing for the Ecology Party against Chris Patten in Bath. At the time of the European Parliament election in 1989, Wall was one of three National Speakers in the Green Party. In the elections themselves, which saw the Green Party gain over 2 million votes (14.5% of the national poll), Wall received 15% of the vote in the Bristol constituency. During his time in the Green Party, Wall has been a Parish Councillor.

Wall rose to national prominence in the wake of the 1989 result, when he presented himself to the national press as a 'left wing' candidate for the ruling Green Party Council in opposition to the leadership. He styled himself a Green 'fundamentalist'. He was then in turn attacked as a 'parasite' by pragmatists such as Sara Parkin and Jonathon Porritt. These divisions contributed to highly negative press coverage at the time.

=== Academic career ===
Wall is a visiting tutor at the Department of Politics at Goldsmiths College, University of London, where he teaches a course on the new radical political economy. His PhD thesis was titled The Politics of Earth First! UK.

He has written a series of books on eco-socialism and green politics. Getting There: Steps Towards a Green Society was published in 1990, and looked at the strategies of green politics. A Green Manifesto for the 1990s, also written in 1990, outlined the Green vision. In 1994, a book examining the roots of ecological politics, Green History: A Reader in Environmental Literature, Philosophy, and Politics and Weaving a Bower Against Endless Night: An Illustrated History of the Green Party as a Green Party publication appeared. Having taken a BSc in Archaeology at the University of London, he subsequently completed a PhD at the University of the West of England, later published in a revised form in 1999 as a book entitled Earth First! and the Anti-Roads Movement: Radical Environmentalism and Comparative Social Movements. Academic reviews for the book were mixed. One academic reviewer commented that the book offered "valuable and often original information about the radical environmentalist movement" but "fails to provide a systematic analysis of the topic" and uncritically paid little attention to possible personal agendas of the activists interviewed.

Babylon and Beyond: The Economics of Anti-Capitalist, Anti-Globalist and Radical Green Movements (2005), looks at the history of anti-capitalism, including reformist capitalists (such as Joseph Stiglitz), anti-corporate critics (namely Naomi Klein and David Korten), monetary reformers, eco-socialists (especially Joel Kovel), Marxists, green localists (including Caroline Lucas, Mike Woodin and Vandana Shiva) and anarchists (particularly Michael Hardt and Toni Negri). It includes a foreword by Nándor Tánczos, the Green Party of Aotearoa New Zealand MP.

Wall has written for the left-wing magazine Red Pepper and is an advisory editor of Socialist Resistance. He has also published articles in academic journals such as Environmental Politics, Social Movement Studies and Capitalism Nature Socialism.

=== Later political activism ===
Wall was also a prominent figure opposing the organisational changes by the group known as Green 2000 along with Penny Kemp and John Norris. Organising a faction within the Green Party known as the Association of Socialist Greens, this left grouping was accused by pragmatists such as Mallen Baker as being responsible for ensuring the party was "going knowhere fast".

Wall is an eco-socialist and anti-capitalist who believes that "an infinitely growing capitalist economy destroys nature, fuels injustice and leads to an alienated way of life". He describes Green politics as "the politics of survival", stressing that "unless we build a green economy based on meeting need rather than greed our children face a bleak future". Distinguishing between socially-oriented development and capitalist growth, Wall asserts that there is "no contradiction between development and ecology," while, on the other hand, there is "a contradiction between capitalist economic growth and human life – and the life of all other species." He adds that "a world dominated by the need for constant growth puts people and the rest nature behind a blind economic system of accumulation." He is a founder member of the Green Left, an anti-capitalist and eco-socialist faction within the Green Party, which held its first meeting in June 2006.

His critique of Green Party politics is that ambition tends to dilute policy, reduce democracy and lead to failure. He says of the Green 2000 project to modernise the executive structures and reduce the number of Principal Speakers to two:

"The right around the Green 2000 faction wanted to make us into a mainstream party with mass appeal, ditch the radicalism, re-engineer the Party constitution and centralise power. We fought them. I remember Sara Parkin talking to the Independent about 'socialist parasites' i.e. myself and Penny Kemp who had been members nearly as long as her. They won and then imploded, when the Party received just a couple of percentage at the 1992 General Election. When the 'realists' believe in achieving a Westminster Parliamentary government by 2000 (thus Green 2000), give me fundamentalism."

Wall has continued to be an out-spoken member of the Green Party, particularly on the issue of entering into alliances with other parties. He was given a vote of censure by the Green Party Association of Green Councillors (AGC) when he made comments concerning the alliance between Green Party, Conservative and Liberal Democrat councillors on the Leeds City Council; he stated in Red Pepper magazine that, "While I understand that repellent Labour councils may be the only substitute for alliances with Liberal Democrats and Conservatives, the fall in our Leeds West vote suggests that voters were displeased by a perceived shift to the right by Yorkshire Greens".

At the 2005 general election, Wall stood as a candidate for Windsor and received 2.5% of the votes. In November 2005, he was beaten by Keith Taylor in the election to be the Male Principal Speaker of the Green Party, by 851 votes to 803. He was narrowly elected as one of two Principal Speakers of the Green Party of England and Wales in November 2006, alongside Siân Berry. In 2007 he was re-elected as Male Principal Speaker alongside Caroline Lucas, elected to the post of Female Principal Speaker. The position of principal speaker was the closest role to that of leader within the Green Party until 2008.

Derek Wall giving a keynote speech at the Green Party of England and Wales conference, Reading, 2008

He was prominent in the Green Empowerment group that campaigned against the creation of a single leader and deputy leader instead of the Principal Speaker system. He attacked the proposal for a referendum in Swansea:

I find the title "leader" embarrassing: it is so patronising, assuming a bunch of people have to be "led", the shepherd label that assumes the members are sheep.

Wall's critique centred on the link between the structure of leadership and ambition of the party; and the likelihood that a Leader coupled with ambition would be part of a project to move the party to the "right":

Political parties universally tend to attract those addicted to fame and careerism. ... Clearly, the biggest barrier to green electoral victory is the lack of proportional representation. Greens have been elected around the world in countries with PR. ... The fear is that a leader will shift the party to the right, cutting the Greens' radical edge. ... The call for a single leader would compromise the party's commitment to radical democracy. It also suggests a failure to think about strategy in any real sense. The fear is that it could be part of a more extensive shift towards a new green politics of shallow environmentalism, rather than a thorough critique of an unequal, profit-motivated society.

He also linked the idea of a leadership structure directly to abuse of power. His September 2007 keynote speech took up this theme:

what is power? You can't touch it or taste it. Sometimes I think you can smell it, like wealth or sewage, and if it is piled up in one place it stinks like rotten cod. For it to smell sweet, we need to spread it around. For power to be creative, we need to spread it around.

Collecting power in one place is like collecting money in a mega billion bank account, the work of a miser, a misery, a self obsessed fanatic. Green politics is about giving everyone power.

At times, personal attacks surfaced in Wall's comments in the debate. Replying to a Guardian letter from Jonathon Porritt and others supporting leadership, Wall drew parallels with Porritt's own behaviour as a green 'leader':

Jonathon Porritt's call for the Green Party to select a single leader is flawed. Rather than suggesting the Green Party becomes a little more like the conventional top down political parties, Jonathon could show a little more personal leadership. Last year he took 42 flight clocking up air miles to go to meetings to tell people to cut CO2. I am calling on Jonathon to use video conferencing a little more and to fly a little less.

In the subsequent party-wide referendum, 73% of members polled voted to create a single leader. Wall said of the result, "The result of this referendum challenges the Party to create a leadership structure that is true to green ideals. It has put our future leaders on notice that the membership expects a more focused, more effective party, with a leadership team that is truly accountable to the membership in a real and effective manner".

Nevertheless, in 2010 he declared himself a candidate for the post of deputy leader under the new system, losing to the incumbent Adrian Ramsay. During his Deputy Leader campaign, Wall continued to promote the view that a "right" wing of the Green party is attempting to subvert its democracy, agreeing that "talk of 'modernising' the Green Party [is] actually code for changing inner Party democracy and changing the politics of the Party". Nevertheless, Wall's opponents, the joint ticket of Adrian Ramsay and Caroline Lucas, continue to promote both reform of the party and a left-leaning politics. Derek's defeat was met with disappointment from Green Lib Dems, who cited his defeat as a loss of a "good source of ammunition against the [Green] party".

== Moving beyond capitalism ==
=== Strategies ===
In a chapter of Babylon and Beyond entitled "Life After Capitalism: Alternatives, Structures, Strategies", Wall suggests that "conventional economics is surprisingly dangerous for a subject normally portrayed as a neutral science", and advocates the proposition of "solid liveable alternatives" by the anti-capitalist movement. Though he does not discount the "plots and plans" of the corporate lobby, American neo-conservatives, and free market liberals, which are "hardly secret", he criticises the tendency of many anti-capitalists to be attracted to "warm conspiracies" which "generate a personal enemy with a human face who can be challenged". Instead, he wishes to address the "structural element" of capitalism, drawing on the critical realist philosophy of Roy Bhaskar, who suggests that "invisible structures", like capitalism and language, shape society but can themselves be changed by human activity. This means that "the conspirators construct, where they are successful, new structures, but as capitalists they are themselves bearers of deeper structural imperatives to exploit labour, subjectivity and the earth".

Stating that "history does not march to a predictable narrative", Wall criticises the determinism of some Marxists, on the one hand, who promote "hyperglobalisation" in an attempt to move the world closer to the apparently inevitable socialist order, and, on the other hand, subsistence ecofeminists, who look to turn to clock back to the time of peasant societies. He rejects productivism in favour of "in different contexts economic arrangements that fulfil need equitably, develop humanity, sustain ecosystems and lead to cooperation".

=== Propositions ===
Wall first suggests "embedded markets", embedded in society, with "state provision decentralised", as a first step to adapt capitalism. He cites the example of the Indian adivasis, who regained the land they originally inhabited and sold tea via the Fair trade system. Here, Wall argues that "social preference rather than profit maximisation socialised economic activity". He welcomes the movements in Argentina that have seen workers occupy and reopen bankrupt factories. He applauds the work done on creating a "decentralised, socialist economy" in Cuba and Venezuela. Wall is encouraged by the growth in Green consumerism, noting that "we cannot shop or work our way to utopia, but such projects ease present ills and point roughly to a different future".

Taking on the work of Marx on the distinction between use-values and exchange-values, Wall stresses that "exchange values must be rejected", so that "economics can be bent towards serving the needs of humanity and nature rather than its own violent abstract growth". This means building things to last and sharing resources: he advocates the increased use of libraries, permaculture and the localisation of economies where possible. He highlights the Rastafarian notion of 'Ital', a form of localism in which "what is sacred is what comes from the earth and is grown locally", and where localism and internationalism are mixed "without building walls between sects" in what Wall calls a "worldwide rooted cosmopolitanism".

Nonetheless, Wall envisages as the ultimate aim the rolling back of both the market and the state. To this end, he wishes to "defend, extend and deepen" the commons against enclosure as a way of giving people back their means of production. He believes that the extension of the commons provides the best model for consensus-based social and ecological management and sharing. In the same vein, Wall supports Open Source Software as one of the "new commons regimes ... created with technological and social change", one which "is a stunning example of how both the market and the state can be bypassed by cooperative creativity". "Marx," he quips, "would have been a Firefox user".

== Non-violent direct action ==
Wall stresses the importance of combining electoral politics and non-violent direct action to effect change. Babylon and Beyond focuses heavily on unique and creative expressions of anti-capitalist economics and protest, and Wall tells protestors "to keep making noise". He has cultivated ties with African-American and Afro-Caribbean Green activists and takes a strong interest in the controversial Pennsylvania-based African-American organisation MOVE. From 1995, he helped develop a British-based campaign to free US death row prisoner Mumia Abu-Jamal.

== Zen ==
Wall practices zazen and is influenced by spirituality through "pursuing a pagan appreciation of the living world in a variety of ways". In Babylon and Beyond, he argues that Zen acts as a guard against utopianism as it "is based on being in the world rather than escaping from it". He also links anti-capitalism and Zen, stating, based on the work of anthropologist and economist Marshall Sahlins, that "Zen minimises need and provides an alternative road to affluence".

== Quotes ==
- How to be green? Many people have asked us this important question. It's really very simple and requires no expert knowledge or complex skills. Here's the answer. Consume less. Share more. Enjoy life.
- At present cats have more purchasing power and influence than the poor of this planet. Accidents of geography and colonial history should no longer determine who gets the fish.
- This will be a long fight and anti-capitalism may fail. Nevertheless, at the very worst, even in failure we might succeed in bearing witness to the pathological absurdities of a world where money makes human beings and the rest of nature a means rather than an end.

== See also ==
- Degrowth
- Ian Angus
- John Bellamy Foster
- Mumia Abu-Jamal
- The Rise of the Green Left
- Zazen

== Notes ==
=== References ===
- Wall, Derek (2010). The No-Nonsense Guide to Green Politics. Oxford: New Internationalist Publications. ISBN 978-1-906523-39-8.

== Bibliography ==
- Wall, Derek, Getting There: Steps Towards a Green Society, 1990. ISBN 1-85425-034-5
- Kemp, Penny and Wall, Derek, A Green Manifesto for the 1990s, 1990. ISBN 0-14-013272-4
- Wall, Derek, Green History: A Reader in Environmental Literature, Philosophy, and Politics, 1994. ISBN 0-203-41013-0
- Wall, Derek, Weaving a Bower Against Endless Night: An Illustrated History of the Green Party, 1994. ISBN 1-873557-08-6
- Wall, Derek, Earth First! and the Anti-Roads Movement: Radical Environmentalism and Comparative Social Movements, 2002. ISBN 0-203-26346-4
- Wall, Derek, Babylon and Beyond: The Economics of Anti-Capitalist, Anti-Globalist and Radical Green Movements, 2005. ISBN 0-7453-2390-1
- Wall, Derek, The Rise of the Green Left: Inside the Worldwide Ecosocialist Movement, 2010. ISBN 978-0-7453-3036-5

Political offices
| Preceded by Keith Taylor | Principal Speaker of the Green Party of England and Wales; 2006–2008 | Succeeded by Position abolished |
