= Environment in Bristol =

Bristol was ranked in 2008 as the UK's most sustainable city by the environmental charity Forum for the Future, and in 2015 it received the European Green Capital Award. The Bristol Green Capital initiative is managed by a partnership supported by the City Council. Bristol is home to the environmental charities Sustrans, the Soil Association, and the Centre for Sustainable Energy. The city provides a range of recycling services for household waste.

== Sustainability ratings ==
=== Sustainable Cities Index ===
Based on its environmental performance, quality of life, future-proofing and how well it is addressing climate change, recycling and biodiversity, Bristol was ranked as the UK's most sustainable city, topping environmental charity Forum for the Future's Sustainable Cities Index 2008.

=== European Green Capital Award ===
Bristol received the European Green Capital Award in 2015.

== Environmental initiatives ==
=== Bristol Green Capital ===
In 2007, the Bristol Partnership launched the Green Capital initiative in order to invite organisations in the city to play their part in helping tackle climate change and contribute to Bristol's ambition of becoming a leading UK green capital.

The Green Capital Partnership has been funded by Bristol City Council and in 2010 a manager's post was established. The council has adopted its own Green Capital Action Plan.

The Partnership is run by a Momentum Group and a Steering Group. The Momentum Group meets quarterly and is open to anyone who has signed the Green Capital pledge "to help make Bristol a low-carbon city with a high quality of life for all". The Steering Group is made up of the chairs of sub-groups and key partner organisations. Their role is to agree the way the operating budget is spent and to direct the manager's work programme.

=== Sustrans ===
Sustrans, a British charity which promotes sustainable transport, is based in Bristol. The first route in the National Cycle Network was the Bristol to Bath cycle path.

=== Resourcesaver ===
"Resourcesaver" was established in 1988 as a non-profit business by Avon Friends of the Earth.

== Waste management ==
Collections of different types of household waste in Bristol comprise two categories of recyclable waste, food waste, garden waste, and non-recyclable waste. There is also a range of recycling banks. There are currently two household recycling centres located at Avonmouth and St Philips. Plans for a third site in Hartcliffe were deferred in 2015.
