= Paul Ekins =

British academic and economist

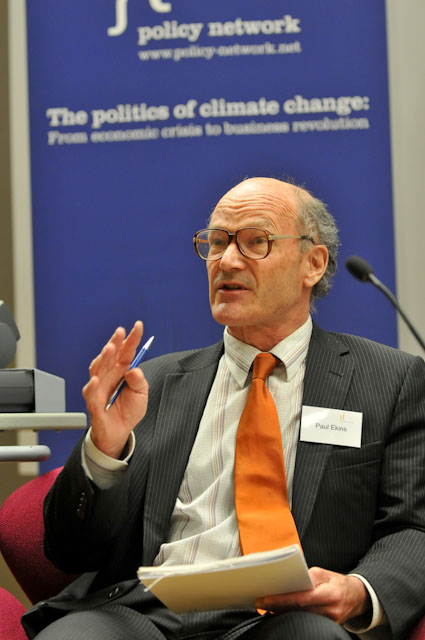
- Paul Ekins
- Born: 1950 (age 75–76)
- Education: Birkbeck, University of London (Ph.D.)
- Occupation: Academic
- Organization: University College London
- Known for: Sustainable economics
- Notable work: Predicted substantial reserves of fossil fuels should remain in the ground to prevent temperature increases beyond 2 degrees
- Title: Professor
- Political party: Member of the Green Party UK
- Awards: OBE
- Website: UCL Institute for Sustainable Resources

Paul Ekins, OBE (born 1950) is a British academic in the field of sustainable economics, currently Professor of Resources and Environment Policy at University College London. He was formerly co-director of the UK Energy Research Centre (2004–2014). He is a former member of the Green Party.

== Political career ==
Ekins was a prominent member of the Green Party UK in the 1970s and 1980s. He left in 1986 after controversy over reforms he and others were promoting to streamline Green Party structures. This group, known as "Maingreen", was seen as a forerunner of the moves to reform the later Green Party of England and Wales party's internal structures by a later group known as Green 2000.

== Career after politics ==
Ekins has been a prominent green academic in the field of sustainable economics. He has also worked as a consultant. In 1996, he set up Forum for the Future with Sara Parkin and Jonathon Porritt. The Forum says: “When Paul Ekins set up the Sustainable Economy Unit as part of Forum for the Future back in 1996, he argued that ‘many of today’s environmental problems are really economic problems in disguise, and getting the economics right lies at the heart of any solutions agenda.’ He aimed ‘to show that radical moves towards environmental sustainability are compatible with prosperity’. This remains a central part of Forum's mission.”

He worked as head of the Environment group at the Policy Studies Institute.

He has worked as an advisor to the Environmental Audit Select Committee of the British House of Commons. In 1994, Ekins received a UN Environment Programme Global 500 Award ”for outstanding environmental achievement”.

Ekins was appointed Officer of the Order of the British Empire (OBE) in the 2015 New Year Honours for services to environmental policy.

== Academic career ==
Paul Ekins took a Ph.D. in economics at Birkbeck, University of London. He became Professor of Sustainable Development at the University of Westminster, from October 2002 – 2007. He is currently Professor of Resources and Environmental Policy at University College London.

His academic work examines the "conditions and policies for achieving an environmentally sustainable economy". Ekins has predicted that substantial reserves of fossil fuels should remain in the ground and not be burned if humans are to prevent temperature increases beyond 2 degrees. His original work with Christophe McGlade in 2015 has been supported by more recent analysis.

== Author ==
He is author of a number of books:

- Paul Ekins (1992), A New world order, London: Routledge, ISBN 0415071143, OL 1319852M, 0415071143
- Paul Ekins (1992), The Gaia atlas of green economics, New York: Anchor Books, ISBN 0385419147, 0385419147
- Paul Ekins (1993), Cities and sustainability, Swindon: AFRC-SERC Clean Technology Unit, ISBN 1870669045, OCLC 28261170, OL 15198651M, 1870669045
- Paul Ekins; Manfred A. Max-Neef (14 August 1992), Real Life Economics, Routledge, ISBN 9780415079778, OL 7482254M, 0415079772
- Paul Ekins (1998), Ecological tax reform, environmental policy and the competitiveness of British industry, London: Forum for the Future, OL 17396185M
- Paul Ekins (2000), Economic growth and environmental sustainability, London: Routledge, ISBN 978-0415173339, OL 16240686M, 0203011759
- Paul Ekins (2010), Hydrogen energy, London: Earthscan, ISBN 9781844076802, OCLC 428731286, OL 24407941M, 1844076806
- Paul Ekins (2011), Environmental tax reform (ETR), Oxford: Oxford University Press, ISBN 9780199584505, OL 25087791M, 0199584508
- Paul Ekins; Mike Bradshaw; Jim Watson (2015), Global Energy: Issues, Potentials and Policy Implications, Oxford University Press, ISBN 978-0198719533, OL 25884925M, 0198719531

== See also ==
- Environmental economics
- Forum for the Future
- Green economy
- Green Party of England and Wales
- Policy Studies Institute
- Sustainability
- Sustainable development

Party political offices
Preceded by Jean Lambert, Alec Pontin and Jonathon Porritt	Co-Chair of the Ecology Party; 1983 – 1985; With: Jean Lambert; Jonathan Porritt (1983 – 1984)	Succeeded by Jo Robins, Heather Swailes and Lindy Williams
