= 2015 Bracknell Forest Borough Council election =

2015 local election in Bracknell Forest

← 2011	7 May 2015	2019 →

All 42 seats to Bracknell Forest Borough Council 22 seats needed for a majority
- Turnout: 67% (▲27pp)
	First party	Second party
	Con	Lab
Leader	Paul Bettison	Mary Temperton
Party	Conservative	Labour
Leader's seat	Little Sandhurst & Wellington	Great Hollands North
Last election	40 seats, 57.5%	2 seats, 28.3%
Seats won	41	1
Seat change	▲1	▼1
Popular vote	31,441	13,455
Percentage	52.0%	22.2%
Swing	▼5.5%	▼6.1%
- Results of the 2015 Bracknell Forest Borough Council election
Council control before election
Conservative
Council control after election
Conservative

The 2015 Bracknell Forest Borough Council election took place on 7 May 2015 to elect all 42 councillors in 18 wards for Bracknell Forest Borough Council in England. The election took place alongside both the 2015 United Kingdom general election and other local elections in England. With the concurrent general election, turnout significantly increased compared to the last local election. The Conservative Party was returned to a sixth term in office, continuing its hold on the council since its inception as a unitary authority in 1998. The Labour Party was reduced to the single seat of its group leader in Great Hollands North - its worst result since 1987.

The local Conservative party had been rocked by a series of suspensions and defections during the last term. After a revolt on the Conservative group over housing, Chas Bailey (Hanworth), Shelagh Pile (Harmans Water), and Michael Sargeant (Bullbrook) were suspended for four months. Bailey initially returned to the Conservatives, but later elected to stand as a 'Hanworth & Birch Hill Residents' candidate after being de-selected. Sargeant and Pile declined to rejoin, sitting first as independent conservatives, and then later joining the fledging UKIP. Several other Conservative councillors were de-selected for the 2015 election, including former council leader Alan Ward (Central Sandhurst). Will Davison (Hanworth) also joined UKIP after being de-selected. Davison and Pile stood as UKIP candidates but both lost their seats, as did Bailey. For a period, after the death of Alan Kendall in Winkfield & Cranbourne, the final council composition before the election was 35 Conservatives, 3 UKIP, and 2 Labour, and 1 Hanworth & Birch Hill Residents.

== Summary ==
2015 Bracknell Forest Borough Council Election
Party	Seats	Gains	Losses	Net gain/loss	Seats %	Votes %	Votes	+/−
Conservative	41	1	0	+1	98	52.0	31,441	
Labour	1	0	1	-1	2	22.2	13,455	
UKIP	0	0	0	0	0	10.1	6,097	
Liberal Democrats	0	0	0	0	0	6.7	4,079	
Green	0	0	0	0	0	4.2	2,558	
Binfield Independent Conservatives	0	0	0	0	0	2.1	1,280	
Hanworth & Birch Hill Residents	0	0	0	0	0	1.3	778	
Independent (candidates)	0	0	0	0	0	1.1	668	
TUSC	0	0	0	0	0	0.3	156	

== Ward results ==
An asterisk (*) denotes an incumbent councillor standing for re-election

=== Ascot ===
Ascot (2)
Party	Candidate	Votes	%	±%
Conservative	Dorothy Andrea Susan Hayes*	1,916	63.5	−11.0
Conservative	Tony Virgo*	1,607		
Labour	Bob Draper	420	13.9	−11.6
Green	Sarah Louise Cottle	385	12.8	New
Labour	Tony House	319		
Liberal Democrats	David James Lindop	298	9.9	New
Liberal Democrats	Tristan Luke Pithers	223		
Turnout			71	
Registered electors		4,207		
Conservative hold		Swing		
Conservative hold		Swing		

=== Binfield with Warfield ===
Binfield with Warfield (3)
Party	Candidate	Votes	%	±%
Conservative	John Bruce Harrison*	2,995	56.5	+7.2
Conservative	Sarah Wendy Peacey	2,917		
Conservative	Ian William Leake*	2,813		
Binfield Independent Conservatives	Nigel John Rennie	1,280	24.1	−6.0
Labour	David John Fawcett	1,028	19.4	−1.2
Labour	Timothy Hanson	906		
Labour	Dennis Rueben Good	759		
Turnout			70	
Registered electors		6,856		
Conservative hold		Swing		
Conservative hold		Swing		
Conservative hold		Swing		

=== Bullbrook ===
Bullbrook (2 seats)
Party	Candidate	Votes	%	±%
Conservative	Bob Angell*	1,547	54.2	−5.1
Conservative	Kirsten Miller	1,365		
Labour	Caroline May Egglestone	884	31.0	−9.7
Labour	Graham William Firth	775		
Liberal Democrats	Kim Lyons	422	14.8	New
Turnout			63	
Registered electors		4,487		
Conservative hold		Swing		
Conservative hold		Swing		

=== Central Sandhurst ===
Central Sandhurst (2 seats)
Party	Candidate	Votes	%	±%
Conservative	Michael Richard Brossard*	1,717	63.0	−10.2
Conservative	Phillip Jeffrey King	1,585		
Labour	Anne Brunton	552	20.3	−6.5
Liberal Democrats	Dale Clark	456	16.7	New
Labour	Alan Harold Round	321		
Turnout			69	
Registered electors		3,928		
Conservative hold		Swing		
Conservative hold		Swing		

=== College Town ===
College Town (2 seats)
Party	Candidate	Votes	%	±%
Conservative	Nick Allen*	1,765	66.6	+4.3
Conservative	Pauline Ann McKenzie	1,563		
Labour	Narendra Bahadur Angdembe	544	20.5	−2.2
Labour	Keith Howard George Roberts	419		
Liberal Democrats	Darren Antony Bridgman	342	12.9	−2.1
Turnout			66	
Registered electors		4,018		
Conservative hold		Swing		
Conservative hold		Swing		

=== Crown Wood ===
Crown Wood (3 seats)
Party	Candidate	Votes	%	±%
Conservative	Colin Reginald Dudley*	1,809	48.9	−9.3
Conservative	Marc Brunel-Walker*	1,723		
Conservative	Suki Hayes*	1,491		
Labour	Wilf Holness	988	26.7	−15.1
UKIP	David Jones	904	24.4	New
Labour	John Kenneth Wright	856		
UKIP	Olivio Barreto	811		
Labour	Matthew Edward White	808		
Turnout			63	
Registered electors		5,989		
Conservative hold		Swing		
Conservative hold		Swing		
Conservative hold		Swing		

=== Crowthorne ===
Crowthorne (2 seats)
Party	Candidate	Votes	%	±%
Conservative	Jim Finnie*	1,774	63.7	+2.8
Conservative	Bob Wade*	1,567		
Liberal Democrats	Stephen Pope	611	21.9	+2.5
Liberal Democrats	Steven Christopher Freeman	534		
Labour	Vera Olive Shambrook	400	14.4	−5.3
Labour	Nazeer Mohammed	346		
Turnout			72	
Registered electors		4,042		
Conservative hold		Swing		
Conservative hold		Swing		

=== Great Hollands North ===
Great Hollands North (2 seats)
Party	Candidate	Votes	%	±%
Labour	Mary Louise Temperton*	1,823	50.0	+2.9
Conservative	Peter Hill	1,348	36.9	−4.5
Conservative	Michael Adeniyi Gbadebo	1,321		
Labour	Naheed Ejaz	829		
Green	Mark Daniel Brown	390	10.7	−0.7
TUSC	Neil Robert Adams	88	2.4	New
Turnout			65	
Registered electors		5,328		
Labour hold		Swing		
Conservative hold		Swing		

=== Great Hollands South ===
Great Hollands South (2 seats)
Party	Candidate	Votes	%	±%
Conservative	Jan Angell*	1,087	36.8	−24.1
Conservative	Jennie McCracken*	1,083		
Labour	Clive Temperton	839	28.4	−10.7
Labour	Peter Charles Frewer	601		
UKIP	Jeff Newbold	479	16.2	New
Green	Derek Gregory Clifford Florey	306	10.4	New
Liberal Democrats	Thomas Desmond MacMahon	245	8.3	New
Turnout			67	
Registered electors		3,796		
Conservative hold		Swing		
Conservative hold		Swing		

=== Hanworth ===
Hanworth (3 seats)
Party	Candidate	Votes	%	±%
Conservative	Gill Birch*	1,689	37.7	−14.9
Conservative	Sandra Kay Ingham	1,531		
Conservative	Malcolm Ian Tullett	1,530		
Labour	Adam Smith	854	19.1	−14.6
Labour	James Victor Quinton	797		
UKIP	William Davison* (Note: Baily, Davison and Pile were elected as Conservative Party candidates in 2011.)	780	17.4	New
Hanworth & Birch Hill Residents	Charles Walter Baily*	778	17.4	New
Labour	Stephen Geoffrey Young	701		
UKIP	Charles Wade	667		
Hanworth & Birch Hill Residents	David John Robert Elford	480		
Hanworth & Birch Hill Residents	Philip Vincent Marshall Pitt	422		
Liberal Democrats	David Droar	379	8.5	New
Turnout			65	
Registered electors		6,190		
Conservative hold		Swing		
Conservative hold		Swing		
Conservative hold		Swing		

=== Harmans Water ===
Harmans Water (3 seats)
Party	Candidate	Votes	%	±%
Conservative	Isabel Margaret Mattick	2,037	47.9	−12.7
Conservative	Christopher Richard Martin Turrell*	1,973		
Conservative	Ash Merry	1,953		
UKIP	Shelagh Rosemary Pile*	951	22.4	+11.1
Labour	Nicola Louise Strudley	847	19.9	−8.2
Labour	Keith Scott MacDonald	841		
Labour	Diane Cheryl Thomas	820		
UKIP	John Richard Stringer	711		
UKIP	Robert David Warren	640		
Green	Susan Dawn Rayment	419	9.9	New
Turnout			65	
Registered electors		6,571		
Conservative hold		Swing		
Conservative hold		Swing		
Conservative hold		Swing		

=== Little Sandhurst and Wellington ===
Little Sandhurst and Wellington (2 seats)
Party	Candidate	Votes	%	±%
Conservative	Dale Philip Birch*	1,578	50.1	−12.0
Conservative	Paul David Bettison*	1,570		
Liberal Democrats	Mark David Vandersluis	568	18.1	−2.7
Labour	Val Goodwin-Higson	506	16.1	−1.0
UKIP	Paul Raymond Connell	495	15.7	New
Labour	John Stefan Piasecki	331		
Turnout			71	
Registered electors		4,019		
Conservative hold		Swing		
Conservative hold		Swing		

=== Old Bracknell ===
Old Bracknell (2 seats)
Party	Candidate	Votes	%	±%
Conservative	William Peter Heydon*	1,191	46.9	−4.7
Conservative	Iain Alexander McCracken*	1,087		
Labour	Roy John Bailey	819	32.3	−16.1
Labour	Kathleen Mary Nugent	797		
UKIP	Roger Alan Inions	461	18.2	New
UKIP	Amira Sagher	406		
TUSC	Terry Frank Pearce	68	2.7	New
TUSC	Val Pearce	62		
Turnout			62	
Registered electors		4,237		
Conservative hold		Swing		
Conservative hold		Swing		

=== Owlsmoor ===
Owlsmoor (2 seats)
Party	Candidate	Votes	%	±%
Conservative	John Porter*	1,390	50.7	−11.3
Conservative	David James Worrall*	1,261		
UKIP	John Blewitt	542	19.8	New
Liberal Democrats	Ray Earwicker	468	17.1	−1.5
Labour	Brian David Wilson	340	12.4	−7.0
Liberal Democrats	Larraine Kerry De Laune	284		
Labour	Leo Eli Orlando Anniballi	277		
Turnout			70	
Registered electors		3,899		
Conservative hold		Swing		
Conservative hold		Swing		

=== Priestwood and Garth ===
Priestwood and Garth (3 seats)
Party	Candidate	Votes	%	±%
Conservative	Alvin Edwin Finch*	1,561	45.4	+2.3
Conservative	Graham Edward Birch	1,296		
Conservative	Tina McKenzie-Boyle	1,281		
Labour	Tricia Brown*	1,038	30.2	−10.6
Labour	Paul Steven Bidwell	1,033		
Labour	Diane Elizabeth Allum-Wilson	902		
UKIP	Terry Dilliway	842	24.5	New
UKIP	Carolynn Ann Tilbury	634		
Turnout			61	
Registered electors		5,717		
Conservative hold		Swing		
Conservative hold		Swing		
Conservative gain from Labour		Swing		

=== Warfield Harvest Ride ===
Warfield Harvest Ride (3 seats)
Party	Candidate	Votes	%	±%
Conservative	Gareth Michael Barnard*	3,081	63.8	+8.2
Conservative	Robert Lauchlan McLean*	2,380		
Conservative	Cliff Thompson*	2,164		
Green	Adrian Michael Haffegee	710	14.7	+4.5
Labour	Maggie Gibbons	588	12.2	−0.5
Labour	Anne Shillcock	512		
Independent	Jason Kilmartin	449	9.3	New
Independent	Martyn John Towle	403		
Turnout			71	
Registered electors		5,965		
Conservative hold		Swing		
Conservative hold		Swing		
Conservative hold		Swing		

=== Wildridings & Central ===
Wildridings & Central (2 seats)
Party	Candidate	Votes	%	±%
Conservative	Dee Hamilton*	1,092	47.6	−0.4
Conservative	Michael John Skinner	988		
Labour	Andrew Paul Jackson	694	30.2	−2.9
Labour	Guy Alexander Gillbe	660		
Liberal Democrats	Patrick Robert Smith	290	12.6	+0.7
Independent	Lee Anthony Cooper	219	9.5	New
Independent	Justin Paul Bellhouse	188		
Turnout			64	
Registered electors		3,493		
Conservative hold		Swing		
Conservative hold		Swing		

=== Winkfield & Cranbourne ===
Winkfield & Cranbourne (2 seats)
Party	Candidate	Votes	%	±%
Conservative	Moira Kathleen Gaw	1,864	59.3	−12.1
Conservative	Susie Phillips	1,797		
UKIP	Ken La Garde	643	20.4	New
Green	Derek Norman Wall	348	11.1	−3.6
Labour	Carol Ann Draper	291	9.3	−4.6
Labour	Lesley Margaret Hunter	248		
Turnout			73	
Registered electors		4,034		
Conservative hold		Swing		
Conservative hold		Swing		

== By-elections ==
=== Central Sandhurst ===
Central Sandhurst By-Election 20 October 2016
Party	Candidate	Votes	%	±%
Conservative	Gaby Kennedy	476	69.3	+6.3
Labour	Anne Brunton	211	30.7	+10.4
Majority		265	38.6	
Turnout		687	17	−52
Registered electors		3,959		
Conservative hold		Swing		
