= PopOffsets =

PopOffsets was a web-based, carbon offsetting project of Population Matters. In 2018 the project was superseded by Empower to Plan, a crowdfunding project for supporting family planning providers.

== Population Matters ==
Founded in 1991, Population Matters is a leading UK campaigning charity concerned with the effects of current world population growth on the natural environment, particularly regarding climate change. It advocates for population stabilisation through improved access to rights-based family planning schemes. Population Matters commissioned a research paper entitled "Fewer Emitters, Lower Emissions, Less Cost" which indicates that addressing unmet needs for family planning is the most cost-effective way of reducing CO_{2} emissions and climate change – possibly less than one third of the cost of other technological fixes – without any environmental downsides. They estimate that every $7 (£4) spent on family planning saves one tonne of CO_{2}. A similar reduction would require a $13 (£8) investment in tree planting, $24 (£15) in wind power, $41 (£31) in solar energy and $92 (£56) in hybrid vehicle technology.

Launched in 2009, PopOffsets was the first and only carbon offsetting scheme worldwide investing its funds in rights-based family planning schemes, health programs, relationship and sex education. Population Matters considers that investing in family planning services is vital for environmental sustainability, with particular regards to women who have little or no access to these services. Every year there are 80 million unintended pregnancies in the world, which could be averted by making sex education and family planning services accessible to everyone.

== How it worked ==
The PopOffsets web-project offered a step-by-step guide enabling contributors to make online donations to Population Matters, in order to support rights-based family planning schemes. Contributors could calculate their estimated annual amount of CO_{2} emissions in their country of residence, using a "CO_{2} calculator". The calculator divided the total amount of the chosen country's CO_{2} emissions by the number of its citizens. The contributor could then decide to offset his/her annual CO_{2} emissions or to opt for a "one-off" amount, by determining the exact amount of CO_{2} that he/she is wishing to offset.

== Funding ==
The funds gathered from online donations were distributed between rights-based family planning schemes, contraceptive services and supplies, sex and relationship education and health programs. Population Matters aims to use the majority of its funds to meet the needs of over 200 million women worldwide who do not have access to family planning services.

== Media coverage ==
The launch of the PopOffsets project on 3 December 2009 received international media coverage from both print and broadcast media outlets, including in The Guardian, The Times, The Sunday Express, The Telegraph, Reuters, BBC and Channel 4.

== Criticism ==
The PopOffsets program received some criticism mostly on the grounds that an offsetter will still have released carbon from fossil fuel consumption while people in developing countries that do not have their own reserves of fossil fuel, while still being responsible for any population growth related habitat loss and deforestation, will typically have very low levels of fossil fuel consumption.

Population Matters, however, stressed that reduction of CO_{2} outputs by the wealthiest is a vital component of any strategy. Note that the replacement Empower to Plan scheme has no carbon offsetting component.

== See also ==
- Carbon offset
- Population Matters
