= Jonathan Tyler =

British Green Party activist and academic (1940–2026)

Sheriff of York
- In office 2016–2017

Chair of the Ecology Party
- In office 1976–1979
- Preceded by: Tony Whittaker (as leader of PEOPLE)
- Succeeded by: Jonathan Porritt

Personal details
- Born: 8 June 1940 Reading, England
- Died: 1 March 2026 (aged 85) York Hospital, York, England
- Party: Green Party of England and Wales (by 0000)
- Other political affiliations: Green Party UK (until 1980s)
- Spouse: Brenda Tyler
- Children: Two

Jonathan Tyler (8 June 1940 – 1 March 2026) was a British Green Party activist and academic.

== Life and career ==
Tyler was born in Reading on 8 June 1940. He was an early parliamentary candidate for the Ecology Party, in the 1976 Walsall North by-election, at a time when he was a transport lecturer at the University of Birmingham. He was the Ecology Party's Chairman for some years from 1976.

He would later go on to stand as a candidate in local elections. During the 1980s, he was associated with attempts by the 'Maingreen' group to streamline the Green Party's internal workings. He subsequently left the Green Party but rejoined some years later.

Tyler joined British Rail as a Traffic Apprentice in 1962. He became a British Rail-sponsored university lecturer and since 2000 has run a consultancy called Passenger Transport Networks. He has specialised in making the case for the importance of integrated strategic timetabling, drawing in particular on the Swiss Taktfahrplan methodology. The Taktfahrplan is based on repeating hourly cycles where trains meet at hubs around symmetry minutes (normally xx.00 and xx.30) to optimise connections in all directions. To create an optimal 'Taktfahrplan' system, infrastructure must be designed with the network timetable in mind. The 'Taktfahrplan' aims to create notions of convenience and accessibility to encourage people to use public transport. Tyler has argued for a National Timetabling Authority to plan an integrated strategic timetable. Tyler has critiqued High Speed 2 from a "green" perspective, and has written about the implications a "green" agenda should have for railway timetabling.

He chaired the York Environment Forum until 2010. As a prominent member of York Green Party, he was its Parliamentary Candidate for York Central in 2015, winning 10% of the vote. He served as Sheriff of York in 2016—2017.

Tyler died on 1 March 2026, aged 85.

Party political offices
Preceded by Tony Whittaker (as leader of PEOPLE)	Chair of the Ecology Party; 1976 – 1979	Succeeded by Jonathan Porritt
