= Sustainability organization =

Organization aiming to advance sustainability

A sustainability organization is (1) an organized group of people that aims to advance sustainability and/or (2) those actions of organizing something sustainably. Unlike many business organizations, sustainability organizations are not limited to implementing sustainability strategies which provide them with economic and cultural benefits attained through environmental responsibility. For sustainability organizations, sustainability can also be an end in itself without further justifications.

Recently, the natural environment has become a key strategic issue in both the business and academic communities. Through "implementing sustainability strategies, firms can integrate long-run profitability with their efforts to protect the ecosystem, providing them with opportunities to achieve the traditional competitive advantages and cost leadership and market differentiation via environmental responsibility". Sustainability strategies have been persistently employed in a number of organizations.

== Definition ==
A sustainable system generally can be defined in environmental terminology as "a living system which operates in a way that it does not use up resources more quickly than they can be naturally replenished; a sustainable economic system operates in a way so that expenditures are either equal or less than the income." Sustainable social systems maintain that all members are allowed to contribute, thereby synthesizing the final product.

=== Corporate sustainability ===
Corporate sustainability refers to "a company’s activities, voluntary by definition, demonstrating the inclusion of social and environmental concerns in business operations and in interactions with stakeholders". Each individual organization should choose its own particular goals and approaches as they pertain to corporate sustainability, matching the organization's aims and intentions and aligning with the organization's strategy, as an appropriate response to the conditions in which it functions.

=== Motives for organizations implementing sustainability strategies ===
==== Ecological motives ====
- Conserving energy
- Conserving resources
- Reducing pollution
- Reducing waste

==== Economic motives ====
- Generating revenue
- Cost reducing potential
- Social licence – does contribute to revenue generation but worthy of own section

Reducing wastage

==== Legal and regulatory pressures ====
- US Clean Air Act
- US Resource Conservation and Recovery Act
- US Clean Water Act

== List of sustainability organizations by topic ==
=== Agriculture ===
Sustainable agriculture incorporates design and management procedures that coincide with natural processes in order to conserve all resources and minimize waste production and damage to natural systems, while preserving or improving farm profitability. Sustainable agriculture systems are "designed to take the greatest advantage of current soil nutrient and water cycles, energy flows, beneficial soil organisms, and natural pest controls. These systems also seek to produce food that is nutritious yet uncontaminated with products such as synthetically compound fertilizers, pesticides, growth regulators, and livestock feed additives. Sustainable agriculture systems often depend on crop rotations, crop residues, animal manures, legumes, green manures, off-farm organic wastes, appropriate mechanical cultivation or minimal tillage to optimize soil biological and natural pest control activity in order to maintain soil fertility and crop productivity." Also, resistant species varieties, and biological and cultural controls are implemented to control pests, weeds and diseases. Sustainable agriculture organizations aim to educate and encourage farmers to implement sustainable agriculture practices into their productions. Many sponsor research and education outreach projects.

Agricultural sustainability organizations:

- Alternative Farming Systems Information Center (AFSIC) info and links to other internet sites and documents on sustainable agriculture
- EnviroLink Network sustainable business network news and information
- National Sustainable Agriculture Information Service offers in-depth publications on production practices, alternative crop and livestock enterprises, innovative marketing, organic certification, and highlights of local, regional, USDA and other federal sustainable agriculture activities.
- Sightline Institute a non-profit organization that aims to foster a sustainable economy and way of life in the Pacific Northwest, a bioregion defined by the watersheds of rivers flowing through North America's temperate rainforest zone
- Sustainable Agriculture Research and Education communication and outreach arm of the Sustainable Agriculture Research and Education Program.
- The Land Institute developing diverse perennial grain cropping systems to solve problems such as soil erosion, energy dependency, and water contamination.
- Sustainable Northwest a Portland, Oregon-based organization forging a sustainable economy in the Pacific Northwest
- The Food Alliance support for sustainable agriculture

=== Building and infrastructure ===
"By using more efficient building methods and materials, it is estimated that we could reduce the energy, resource consumption and / or waste production by 50–60% without decreasing value, aesthetics or function." Taking the Earth's finite resources into consideration, along with acknowledging that manufactured products, including all building materials, affect the Earth's resources, it is becoming very important to make sensible decisions regarding the use of these limited resources to preserve our natural environment along with human civilization. Increased use of resource efficient construction materials and methods will help to induce more sustainable practices throughout the building and construction industry.

Sustainable building and infrastructure organizations:

- Building Green authoritative information on environmentally responsible building design and construction from the publishers of Environmental Building News
- oikos detailed information on sustainable design and construction
- Healthy Building Network promotes healthy building materials as a means of improving public health and preserving the global environment
- Infrastructure Sustainability Council of Australia, was formed by a group of industry professionals from engineering, environmental, planning, legal, financial and construction backgrounds working in both private and public organisations related to infrastructure.
- Northwest Ecobuilding Guild association of building professionals and homeowners interested in ecologically sustainable building
- thePOOSH.org an Estonian-based NGO with an international scope that connects volunteers with sustainable build projects all around the world to exchange labor, skills and knowledge

=== Business ===
Sustainable business organizations participate in environmentally friendly or green practices in order to make certain that all processes, products, and manufacturing activities sufficiently address current environmental concerns while still retaining a profit. Concurrently, it is a business that “meets the needs of the present world without compromising the ability of the future generations to meet their own needs. It is the method of evaluating how to design products that will correspond to current environmental conditions and how well a company's products perform with renewable resources. There are many organizations and networks currently interacting with businesses in order to integrate sustainability into their central goals and contribute to the environmentally and socially responsible business movement.

Sustainable business organizations:

- Business and Industry Resource Venture, provides free information, assistance and referrals to help Seattle businesses improve their environmental performance
- Business for Social Responsibility a business membership organization
- Center for a Sustainable Economy non-partisan research and policy organization that promotes innovative tax and other market-based approaches to achieving a sustainable economy
- CERES the largest coalition of environmental, investor, and advocacy groups working together for sustainable prosperity. These groups form a community of forward-looking companies that have committed to continuous environmental improvement by endorsing the CERES principles, a ten-point code of environmental conduct.
- Cool Companies A guide for businesses seeking to cut energy costs and reduce pollution.
- Global Environmental Management Initiative standard reporting for environmental, economic and social activity
- GreenBiz A resource center on business, the environment, and the bottom line
- International Society of Sustainability Professionals the professional association for people working in the field of sustainability. Focus is on developing both the profession of sustainability as well as the competencies and expertise of those working in the field.
- Lifestyles of Health and Sustainability a market segment focused on health and fitness, the environment, personal development, sustainable living, and social justice.
- Sacramento Area Sustainable Business Program Regional partnership that encourages businesses to adopt environmentally friendly and sustainable practices. Certifies and promotes businesses that take voluntary actions to conserve energy and water, reduce waste and pollution, recycle and purchase recycled products, improve air quality, and implement green building measures.
- FL Sustainability is an online news and media outlet focused on people, place, and profit, the triple bottom line of sustainability. Based out of Florida, the organization organized a major summit that brought leaders from various innovation sectors together to discuss regional and statewide initiatives to improve quality of life for today and tomorrow.

=== Communities ===
Sustainable community organizations often encourage and cultivate collaborative community projects and education programs that improve connections between businesses, institutions and the public with their communities, the natural environment, and each other. For example, the Sustainable Community Initiatives organization:

- Acts to help the business community, local government and the general public develop an awareness of the value of sustainable community development
- Endeavors to combine knowledge (through public education) and action (in the form of community programs) to promote prosperous and healthy communities
- Explores opportunities to develop educational, entrepreneurial and environmentally sound community-based projects
- Develops materials on the efficient use of urban environmental resources and sustainable activities for distribution to local businesses and to the general public
- Conducts sustainability seminars and workshops for a variety of audiences, e.g. financial institutions, housing development organizations, continuing education programs and community organizations
- Participates in efforts to promote more sustainable tax policies and land use codes
- Integrates into all of SCI's undertakings, the fundamental elements of community sustainability: community partnership, community enterprise, community conservation and community design

Sustainable community organizations:

- The Biomimicry Institute a not-for-profit organization that promotes the study and imitation of nature's remarkably efficient designs, bringing together scientists, engineers, architects and innovators who can use those models to create sustainable technologies.
- Global Ecovillage Network (GEN) a network of sustainable communities and initiatives that bridge different cultures, countries, and continents. GEN serves as umbrella organization for ecovillages, transition town initiatives, intentional communities, and ecologically minded individuals worldwide.
- Partnership for Sustainable Communities (PSC) is a national, nonprofit 501(c)(3) organization based in San Rafael, California, dedicated to helping make American cities and towns more efficient.
- Sacramento Area Sustainable Business Program Regional partnership that encourages businesses to adopt environmentally friendly and sustainable practices. Certifies and promotes businesses that take voluntary actions to conserve energy and water, reduce waste and pollution, recycle and purchase recycled products, improve air quality, and implement green building measures.
- Smart Communities Network energy efficiency and renewable energy – news and events
- Sustainable Connections working with business and community leaders working to transform and model an economy built on sustainable practices
- Global Ecovillage Network 1500+ pages on ecovillages and sustainability
- Sustainable Architecture Buildings and Culture ideas for sustainable communities

=== Economy ===
Despite the fact that some places may be similar in economic terms, the characteristics of a sustainable business model vary from community to community. Many organizations aim to assist communities in developing economic opportunities for all citizens. Some programs exist that "assist individuals in obtaining employment, that create jobs and that help individuals become economically self-sufficient."

Economic sustainability organizations:

- Center for the Advancement of the Steady State Economy (CASSE) is an organization dedicated to advocating a sustainable economy with stabilized population and consumption; such an economy is called a "steady state economy."

=== Environment/energy ===
Environmental sustainability is the "long-term maintenance of ecosystem components and functions for future generations." In addition, environmental sustainability is the process of making sure current processes of interaction with the environment are pursued with the idea of keeping the environment as unspoiled as naturally possible. It maintains that the Earth's resources must not be depleted faster than they can naturally be replenished. Depletion of our finite resources inevitably tries the ability of human civilizations to persist.

Environmental sustainability organizations:

- Bioneers working to preserve biological and cultural diversity
- Friends of the Earth (FOE) is an international environmental organization dedicated to preserving the health and diversity of the planet for future generations
- International Institute for Environment and Development (IIED) promotes sustainable patterns of world development through collaborative research, policy studies, networking and knowledge dissemination
- International Union for Conservation of Nature (IUCN) seeks to conserve the integrity and diversity of nature and to ensure that any use of natural resources is equitable and ecologically sustainable
- New Dream aims to help Americans consume responsibly to protect the environment, enhance quality of life, and promote social justice.
- Northwest Earth Institute a pioneer in taking earth-centered education programs to people where they spend their time-in their neighborhoods, workplaces, homes, schools, and centers of faith
- Renewable Energy Policy Project (REPP) supports the advancement of renewable energy technology through policy research
- Rocky Mountain Institute Works extensively with the private sector, as well as with civil society and government, to create abundance by design and to apply the framework of natural capitalism.
- Sightline Institute is an independent, nonprofit research and communications center—a think tank—founded by Alan Durning in 1993.
- Zero Waste Alliance is a national leader providing assistance to industry sectors and organizations for development and implementation of standards, tools and practices that lead to a more sustainable future through the reduction and elimination of waste and toxics.

=== Law and policy ===
"Regulations, incentives and policies affecting sustainable agriculture are rooted in environmental legislation and laws on the international, Federal, state and local level."

Law and policy sustainability organizations:

- Earth Policy Institute dedicated to building an environmentally sustainable economy; raising awareness to support public response to population growth, rising CO_{2}, loss of species, and other trends that are affecting the Earth
- Global Exchange nonprofit organization that envisions a people-centered globalization that values the rights of workers and the health of the planet; that prioritizes international collaboration as central to ensuring peace; and that aims to create a local, green economy designed to embrace the diversity of our communities.

=== News ===
News sustainability organizations:

- Worldwatch Institute dedicated to fostering the evolution of an environmentally sustainable society—one in which human needs are met in ways that do not threaten the health of the natural environment or the prospects of future generations
- Triple Pundit is an online publication dedicated to promoting the concepts of sustainability to a business audience. The name is a reference to the "Triple Bottom Line" which seeks to balance economy, society, and the environment – a key tenet to sustainable thinking.

=== Non-profit ===
Nonprofit organizations "play a part in society through their social value creation." Many nonprofit organizations have adopted an organizational sustainability focus in both strategic and operational levels of management. Present nonprofit organizations have been required to adopt strategies aimed at establishing viable, sustainable organizations so that they can maintain to pursue their social mission.

Non-profit sustainability organizations:

- Action Without Borders a nonprofit organization founded in 1995 with offices in the United States and Argentina. It runs Idealist.org, an interactive site where people and organizations can exchange resources and ideas, locate opportunities and supporters, and take steps toward building a world where all people can lead free and dignified lives.
- Cielito Lindo Ranch a non-profit organization operating off-the-grid in southwest New Mexico focusing on research into lost-cost easy to implement sustainable technologies that anyone can use to simplify and improve their life.
- Corporate Watch A non-profit organization committed to “holding corporations accountable.” Functions as a resource on corporate globalization research, news stories, and ways to take action. Also, organizes campaigns against political campaign financing, greenwashing, and war profiteering.
- Environmental Working Group (EWG) a not-for-profit environmental research organization that uses the power of information to improve public health and protect the environment by reducing pollution in air, water and food. Based in Washington, D.C., and with an office in Oakland, California, EWG conducts groundbreaking, computer-assisted research on a variety of environmental issues.
- Green Cross International non-profit NGO founded by Mikhail Gorbachev with a mission to help create a sustainable future by cultivating harmonious relationships between humans and the environment
- Shajar Dost Foundation (Pakistan) Shajar Dost is working to increase forest cover in Pakistan. Pakistan has the highest deforestation rate in Asia. Shajar Dost is planting saplings in Murree at Mussyari on three hundred acres.
- Social Venture Network (SVN) promotes new models and leadership for socially and environmentally sustainable business in the 21st century.” As a nonprofit network, they do this by championing member initiatives, information services, and community forums.
- Fair Trade USA nonprofit organization, is one of twenty members of Fairtrade International--Fairtrade Labelling Organizations International (FLO), and the only third-party certifier of Fair Trade products in the United States.

=== Population concern ===
Population concern organizations aim to reduce the ecological footprint of the human species by encouraging and promoting ethical policies and practices that will result in lower levels of population.

Notable population concern organizations include Population Connection and Population Matters.

=== Education and schools ===
Organizations that offer global education resources, products, and services. Many educational organizations offer their own global education programs in the area of environmental sustainability, or resources for the development of sustainability programs.

Specialist sustainability schools:

- Antioch University Seattle has master's and PhD level programs approaching environmental policy and sustainability issues from both a social science and natural science perspective.
- Pinchot University offers both an MBA in Sustainable Business and a Certificate in Sustainable Business. In these programs, students work with distinguished faculty from top business schools to master proven sustainability practices.
- The Association for the Advancement of Sustainability in Higher Education (AASHE). AASHE empowers higher education faculty, administrators, staff and students to be effective change agents and drivers of sustainability innovation.

=== Networking ===
Many organizations provide an outlet for expanding and cultivating social networks in order to attain the most beneficial responses for various goals among sustainability stakeholders. In other words, "many sustainability networking organizations are a catalyst in bringing about systemic change by giving decision makers a shared, science-based understanding of sustainability and a unifying framework for developing a sustainable society."

Sustainability networking organizations:

- Greenpeace uses non-violent direct action and creative communication to expose global environmental problems and to promote solutions that are essential to a green and peaceful future
- Sierra Club is one of the US' oldest, largest environmental organizations for the protection, restoration, and responsible use of earth's resources; site has extensive resources for information, networking, and action.

== See also ==
- Sustainability
- List of sustainability topics
- Outline of sustainability
