= John Guillebaud =

British doctor

- Education: University of Cambridge
- Occupation: Professor of family planning
- Known for: Promoting voluntary family planning to prevent global overpopulation; Author of medical textbooks

John Guillebaud is Emeritus Professor of Family Planning and Reproductive Health at University College London. He was born in Burundi and brought up in Rwanda, Uganda, Kenya, and Britain. He qualified as a medical doctor from University of Cambridge in 1964.

He was medical director of the Margaret Pyke Centre in London from 1998 to 2002.

He is a patron of Population Matters (formerly the Optimum Population Trust) and initiated the environment time capsule project. on which he spoke to the Manchester Literary & Philosophical Society on 11 December 2019 where notes of hir lecture may be viewed.

== Selected publications ==
- “Voluntary family planning to minimise and mitigate climate change”. British Medical Journal 2016;353:i2102 | doi:10.1136/bmj.i2102
- Guillebaud, John (2019). Contraception Today (Nine ed.). Informa Healthcare.
- Guillebaud, John (2017). Contraception: Your Questions Answered (Seven ed.). Churchill Livingstone. ISBN 978-0-7020-7000-6.
- Guillebaud, John (2009). The Pill and other forms of hormonal contraception (The Facts) (Seventh ed.). Oxford University Press. ISBN 978-0-19-956576-4.
