= The Rise of the Green Left =

2010 book by Derek Wall

The Rise of the Green Left: Inside the Worldwide Ecosocialist Movement
- Author: Derek Wall
- Language: English
- Subject: Green politics, eco-socialism
- Published: London
- Publisher: Pluto
- Publication date: 2010
- Publication place: United Kingdom
- Media type: Print
- Pages: 191
- ISBN: 9780745330365
- Dewey Decimal: 320.58

The Rise of the Green Left: Inside the Worldwide Ecosocialist Movement is a 2010 book by British political activist Derek Wall.

== Synopsis ==
The book documents the rise of ecosocialism, from the UK to Latin America. The book is described as documenting "indigenous protest in the Peruvian Amazon to the green transition in Cuba to the creation of red-green parties in Europe" and noting that "ecosocialism is defining the future of left and green politics globally" and the support given to ecosocialism by Evo Morales and Hugo Chavez. The author also writes that Karl Marx was an early pioneer of ecosocialism. The book is recommend as "a great handbook for activists and engaged students of politics".

== Reception ==
The Member of the House of Commons of the United Kingdom for Brighton Pavilion, and then leader of the Green Party of England and Wales Caroline Lucas wrote of the book "with our planet in the grip of a severe environmental crisis we should never tire of seeking fresh alternatives. And, with so many our environmental problems being caused and sustained by an unrelenting demand for economic growth, Derek Wall's The Rise of the Green Left sets out a new political agenda of huge significance. Highly recommended" while Salma Yaqoob, then leader of the Respect Party in the UK praised the book, saying it was "easily the most important book on this subject – The Rise of the Green Left provides an essential guide for anyone interested in how politics and ecology can come together to solve the most pressing issues of our times". In Socialist Review the book was commended, with the reviewer writing Wall's "polemic against the use of market-based instruments to tackle the climate crisis is poignant", whilst criticising some elements. In Peace News the book was described as "passionate, concise and lively".
