= Green 2000 =

Group advocating for an internal reorganisation of the Green Party of England and Wales

Green 2000 was a movement to alter the constitutional arrangements of the Green Party of England and Wales in the early 1990s, with the stated aim of getting a Green government by the year 2000.

== Overview ==
The constitutional changes passed in 1991 included:

- Creating a party Executive of 10 members to replace the Green Party Council of 25
- Reducing the official Principal Speakers from six to two
- Creating a single party Chair to replace the three Co-Chairs
- Creating a Regional Council to hold the Executive accountable between conferences

These Executive and Regional Council structures replaced a very large single "Green Party Council".

Although the changes were adopted by the party, many of the members who proposed the changes left the party at the end of the first year's executive, in September 1992, leaving 'decentralists' and a leftist group called Association of Socialist Greens grouped around the newsletter The Way Ahead, who had opposed the changes, in charge of the party's new structures.

Derek Wall says: “The right around the Green 2000 faction wanted to make us into a mainstream party with mass appeal, ditch the radicalism, reengineer the Party constitution and centralise power. We fought them. I remember Sara Parkin talking to the Independent about 'socialist parasites' i.e. myself and Penny Kemp who had been members nearly as long as her. They won and then imploded, when the Party received just a couple of percentage at the 1992 General Election. When the 'realists' believe in achieving a Westminster Parliamentary government by 2000 (thus Green 2000), give me fundamentalism.”

== Critique of Green 2000 ==
The aim that the Green party could enter government by 2005 was optimistic to some, but it reflected an ‘electoral’ bias – the real division in the Green Party. Opponents at the time felt that direct action, grassroots networking and other tactics were more likely to provide political benefit than a focus on gaining councillors and then Westminster seats. Morrissey, for instance, believed:

“The Party is itself a coalition between its environmentalist and electoralist right wing and a left which is libertarian and anarchistic. The former is comfortable with the traditional party form and conventional political activity. The latter could have rejected the idea of party altogether but has instead tried to reinvent it.”

The group of Green 2000 supporters that ran the party in 1991–2 presided over an unsuccessful General election campaign, which was ill-prepared, and led to a subsequent demoralization and large drop in membership. The party was also unable to cope with the growth in members it had experienced some years before. The strategy was open to criticism for raising hopes unrealistically and not then delivering the necessary changes needed to drive the party forward. However, the Green 2000 group itself felt that the 'decentralists' managed to sap their energies and prevent direction being formed. It also strengthened those in the party who shared Green 2000's electoral bias but thought they were going about in the wrong way.

== Effect on party long term ==
After the departure of Green 2000 the structures that they had put into place remained. A constitutional review was set in motion which lasted three years which was to finally put a number options to the party conference. However even though there was a clear majority for change none of the proposals quite gained the needed two-thirds majority.
