= Tony Whittaker =

Chairman of the Ecology Party
- In office 1975–1976

Chairman of PEOPLE
- In office 1973–1975

Personal details
- Born: 4 May 1932 Coventry, England
- Died: 1 April 2016 (aged 83)
- Party: Ecology Party
- Other political affiliations: PEOPLE (1970s); Conservative (until 1972)
- Education: Warwick School
- Alma mater: University of Birmingham

Anthony Michael "Tony" Whittaker (4 May 1932 – 1 April 2016) was a British solicitor and politician, best known as a co-founder and first Chairman of PEOPLE, later renamed the Green Party.

Born in Coventry, Whittaker was educated at Warwick School and the University of Birmingham. He completed National Service with the Royal Air Force, then worked as a solicitor in Coventry. He joined the Conservative Party and was elected to the local council in Kenilworth.

In 1971, Whittaker married his second wife, Lesley Hill. The two founded their own solicitors' practice in Coventry. Lesley bought the August 1970 issue of Playboy of "a candid conversation with the outspoken population biologist" Dr. Paul Ehrlich. Inspired by the content of this interview, Tony and Lesley decided to give four years to establishing a new political party based on environmental principles. An informal group formed at the Napton Bridge Inn which grew and moved its meeting place. On 13 November 1972, together with Michael Benfield and Freda Sanders, they formed PEOPLE a new political party to field 600 candidates at the next general election, anticipated to be 4 years away. In February 1972 they organised the first public meeting in Coventry. Whittaker served as the party's Chair, and was election agent for Lesley's candidacies in the February and October 1974 UK general elections.

Within the party, Whittaker championed the idea of a basic income and zero growth, and was a vocal opponent of socialism. When Lesley, the first National Secretary, found that the media did not associate the party name with its ideals, a move was proposed to change the name in 1975 to the Ecology Party. However, by this point, the 4 years they had promised to the party were running out. They moved to Exmoor to pursue self-sufficiency farming and reduced their involvement.

At the 1979 general election, Whittaker stood for the Ecology Party in North Devon, a seat held by former leader of the Liberal Party Jeremy Thorpe. He took fourth place with 1.2% of the vote, and gained much publicity for the party. Tony continued to attend party conferences, and to support local party candidates. His wife was involved in the Liberal Democrats as a Devon County councillor and as an election agent in 1994 European and 1997 general elections.

In later years, Whittaker spent his spare time sailing his yacht and developing computer programmes. He was for a time, manager of the sub post office in Hennock.

Party political offices
Preceded by New position	Leader of PEOPLE; 1973 – 1975	Succeeded by Jonathan Tyler
