= Green Party (UK) =

Defunct political party

- Chairperson: Tom A. Wood
- Co-Chairperson: Paul Ekins
- Founded: January 1973; 53 years ago (as PEOPLE); 1975; 51 years ago (as the Ecology Party); June 1985; 41 years ago (as the Green Party)
- Dissolved: 1990
- Preceded by: The Ecology Party
- Succeeded by: Green Party of England and Wales; Green Party Northern Ireland; Scottish Greens
- Headquarters: London
- Ideology: Green politics
- Colours: Green

The Green Party, also known as the Green Party UK, was a Green political party in the United Kingdom.

Prior to 1985, it was called the Ecology Party; before that, it was also named PEOPLE. In 1990, it separated into three regional political parties within the United Kingdom, those being the Green Party of England and Wales, the Scottish Greens, and the Green Party Northern Ireland.

Despite the UK Green Party no longer existing as a unified entity, "Green Party" (singular) is still used colloquially to refer collectively to the three separate parties; for example, in the reporting of opinion polls and election results.

== History ==
=== PEOPLE, 1972–1975 ===
The Green Party's origins go back to PEOPLE, a political party founded in Coventry in November 1972. An interview with overpopulation expert Paul R. Ehrlich in Playboy magazine in August 1970 inspired Tony and Lesley Whittaker, solicitors in Coventry, to give 4 years to establishing a new political party. They met a small group of professional and business people at the Napton Bridge pub in Napton-on-the-Hill near Daventry. Asked to move on because they were overwhelming the pub, they formed the 'Thirteen Club', so named because 13 people first met on 13 September 1972 .This included surveyors and property agents Freda Sanders and Michael Benfield. Tony Whittaker was a former Kenilworth councillor for the Conservative Party. Out of the original 'club' these four individuals founded PEOPLE on 13th November 1972 as a new political party to challenge the UK political establishment. They called its first public meeting on 22 February 1973 at Michael Benfield's estate agency office in Broadgate, in Coventry. Its policy concerns published in 1973 included economics, employment, defence, energy and fuel supplies, land tenure, pollution and social security, all set within an ecological perspective. "Zero growth" (or "steady state") economics were a strong feature in the party's philosophical basis. They planned to field 600 candidates at the next due general election, then 4 years away.

Later recognised as the first Green party in the United Kingdom and Europe as a whole, the party published the 'Manifesto for Survival' in June 1974, between the two general elections of that year. The manifesto was inspired by A Blueprint for Survival published in 1972 by The Ecologist magazine. 'A Manifesto for a Sustainable Society' was an expanded statement of policies published in 1975 published under the newly changed name of the Ecology Party. The editor of The Ecologist, Edward 'Teddy' Goldsmith, merged his 'Movement for Survival' with PEOPLE in 1974. Goldsmith became one of the leading members of the new party during the 1970s.

Membership rose and the party contested both 1974 general elections. In the February 1974 general election, PEOPLE received 4,576 votes in 7 seats. In later years, an influx of left-wing activists took PEOPLE in a more left-wing direction, causing something of a split. In the October 1974 general election, where PEOPLE's average vote fell to just 0.7%; much of the difference was made by Liberal candidates entering the fray.

=== 1975 conference ===
After much debate, the party's 1975 conference adopted a proposal to change its name to the Ecology Party to gain more recognition as the party of environmental concern.

Derek Wall, in his history of the Green Party, contends that the new political movement focused initially on the theme of survival, which shaped the "bleak evolution" of the nascent ecological party during the 1970s. Furthermore, the effect of the "revolution of values" during the 1960s would come later. In Wall's eyes, the party suffered from a lack of media attention and "opposition from many environmentalists", which contrasted the experience of other emerging Green parties, such as Germany's Die Grünen. Nonetheless, PEOPLE invested much of its resources in engaging with the indifferent environmental movement, which Wall calls a "tactical mistake".

=== The Ecology Party, 1975–1985 ===
Ecology Party logo

The party won its first representation in 1976, when John Luck took a seat on Rother District Council in East Sussex, and party Campaign Secretary John Davenport won a parish council seat in Kempsey.

Jonathan Tyler was elected Chairman of the party in 1976, and Jonathon Porritt became a member. At the 1977 Party Conference in Birmingham, the party's first constitution was ratified and Jonathon Porritt was elected to the Ecology Party National Executive Committee (NEC).

In 1979, with Porritt gaining increasing prominence and an election manifesto called The Real Alternative, a decision was taken by the party to field 50 candidates in the forthcoming general election. Fielding 50 candidates would entitle the Ecology Party to election broadcasts on radio and television and this, it was hoped, would considerably raise the party’s public profile. There was some risk attached to this strategy. Each of the fifty candidates standing for election would need to be supported by a £1,000 deposit and it was anticipated that none of the candidates would gain sufficient share of the vote to retain that deposit.

Encouraged by Porritt, The Ecology Party went ahead with the more risky strategy and put forward 53 candidates in the 1979 General Election. The plan worked. The party received 39,918 votes (an average of 1.5%) and membership jumped tenfold from around 500 to 5,000 or more. With this improved membership, a higher public profile and increased public donations, the risk of financial insolvency was avoided.

Following this electoral success, the party introduced annual Spring Conferences to accompany Autumn Conferences, and a process of building up a large compendium of policies began, culminated in today's Policies for a Sustainable Society (which encompasses around 125,000 words). At the same time, according to Wall, "the Post-1968 generation" began to join the party, advocating non-violent direct action as an important element of the Ecology Party vision outside of electoral politics. This manifested itself in an apparent "decentralist faction" who gained ground within the party, leading to the Party Conference stripping the Executive of powers and rejecting the election of a single leader. The new generation was in evidence in the first 'Summer Green Gathering' in July 1980, the action of the Ecology Party CND (later Green CND), and the Greenham Common camp. The party also became increasingly feminist.

=== 1983 general election ===
Due to the recession causing the marginalisation of Green issues, Roy Jenkins leaving the Labour Party to form the Social Democratic Party in 1981, and the inability of the Party to absorb the rapid increase in membership, the early-1980s were extremely tough for the Ecology Party. Nonetheless, the Party prepared for the 1983 general election, inspired by the success of Die Grünen in Germany. At the 1983 general election, the Ecology Party stood over 100 candidates and gained 54,299 votes.

=== Name change and internal strife, 1985–1986 ===
First British 'Green Party' public meeting, Hackney 13 June 1985

The UK experienced a great deal of political change in 1985. After the formation of the Social Democratic Party (SDP), there were noises being made that the UK needed a "green" party. In response to the rumours that a group of Liberal Party activists were about to launch a UK 'Green Party', HELP (the Hackney Local Ecology Party) registered the name The Green Party, with a green circle, designed by Steve O’Brien, as its logo. The first public meeting, chaired by David Fitzpatrick (then an Ecology Party speaker), was 13 June 1985 in Hackney Town Hall. Paul Ekins (then co-chair of the Ecology Party) spoke on the subject of Green politics and the inner city. Hackney Green Party put a formal proposal to the Ecology Party Autumn Conference in Dover that year to change to the Green Party, which was supported by the majority of attendees, including John Abineri, formerly an actor in the BBC series Survivors who supported adding Green to the name to fall in line with other environmental parties in Europe.

The next year, an internal dispute arose within the party. A faction calling itself the Party Organisation Working Group (POWG) proposed constitutional amendments designed to create a streamlined, two-tier structure to govern the internal workings of the party. Decentralists voted these proposals down. Paul Ekins and Jonathan Tyler, prominent party activists and leading members of POWG, then formed a semi-covert group called Maingreen, whose private comments, upon becoming public knowledge, suggested to many that they wished to take control of the party. Tyler and Ekins resigned and left the party but Derek Wall describes how the "wounds" left by the 'Maingreen Affair' lingered on in the heated internal debates of the late 1980s.

=== 1987 general election ===
Meanwhile, the party gained ground electorally. The 1987 general election saw the 133 Greens standing for office take 89,753 votes (1.3% on average), an improvement on 1983. The next two years would see growing membership and increasing media attention. This coincided with greater concern over the environment following the Chernobyl disaster in 1986 and concern over CFCs.

=== Campaign success, 1989 ===
The party enjoyed further success. Its Campaign for Real Democracy' launched by the party allowed it to play a part in the Anti-Poll Tax Campaign. The party's biggest success came at the 1989 European elections, where the Green Party won 2,292,695 votes and received 15% of the overall vote. European elections in Great Britain were then run on a first-past-the-post basis, whilst the three seats in Northern Ireland were elected by single transferable vote, and the party failed to gain any seats.

According to Derek Wall, the party would have gained 12 seats if they had been running in other European countries who employed Proportional Representation. Wall explains this "breakthrough" as a combination of the declining popularity of Margaret Thatcher, the reaction to the Poll Tax, Conservative opposition to the European Union, ineffective Labour Party and Liberal Democrat campaigns and a well-prepared Green Party campaign. That environmental issues were very prominent in UK politics at the time should also be added to this list. At no time before or since have Green issues been so high on the minds of UK voters as a voting issue.

As a result of this success, Sara Parkin and David Icke rose to prominence in the UK media, soon becoming two of the four Principal Speakers, a position created in lieu of a leader. Parkin especially was in demand as a Green spokesperson. However, the new media attention was not always handled well by the party as a whole. In the run up to the 1989 party conference, it attracted criticism for advocating policies aiming to reduce the total population, proposals which were subsequently rejected. Further controversies included Derek Wall's rejection of possible alliances to establish PR. Icke too attracted criticism soon after writing his second book in 1989, an outline of his views on the environment.

Mainstream political parties were, however, alarmed by the Greens' electoral performance and adopted some 'Green policies' in an attempt to counter the threat. In this period, the Green Party had representation in the House of Lords in the person of George MacLeod, Baron MacLeod of Fuinary, who died in 1991. He was the first British Green parliamentarian.

=== The breakup of the party, 1990 ===
In 1990, the Scottish and Northern Ireland wings of the Green Party in the United Kingdom decided to separate amicably from the party in England and Wales, to form the Scottish Greens and the Green Party Northern Ireland. The Wales Green Party became an autonomous regional party and remained within the new Green Party of England and Wales.

== Leadership ==
Of the Ecology party:

1976: Jonathan Tyler
1979: Jonathon Porritt
1980: Gundula Dorey
1982: Jean Lambert, Alec Ponton and Jonathon Porritt
1983: Paul Ekins, Jean Lambert and Jonathon Porritt

Of the Green Party:

Year	Chairs			Principal Speakers					
1985	Jo Robins	Heather Swailes	Lindy Williams	Principal Speakers introduced 1987					
1986	Jo Robins	Jean Lambert	Brig Oubridge	Principal Speakers introduced 1987					
1987	Janet Alty	Tim Cooper	Brig Oubridge	Linda Hendry	Jean Lambert	Richard Lawson	3 Principal Speakers in 1987		
1988	Janet Alty	Liz Crosbie	Penny Kemp	Lindsay Cooke	Jean Lambert	David Icke	Sara Parkin	David Spaven	Frank Williamson
1989	Nick Anderson	Caroline Lucas	Jo Steranka	Janet Alty	Jean Lambert	David Icke	Sara Parkin	Liz Crosbie	Steve Rackett

== Electoral performance ==
=== General elections ===
Election	Votes	Vote share	Seats	Result
1974 (Feb.)	4,576	0.015%	0 / 635	Hung parliament (Lab. minority government)
1974 (Oct.)	1,996	0.007%	0 / 635	Labour victory
1979	39,918	0.1%	0 / 635	Conservative victory
1983	54,299	0.2%	0 / 650	Conservative victory
1987	89,753	0.3%	0 / 650	Conservative victory

=== February 1974 ===
The party stood six candidates in the February 1974 General Election. They received a total of 4,576. The party lost all of its deposits by failing to win 12.5% of the votes cast, namely a total of £900 (equivalent to £8,500 in 2025). (Note: Winning at least 12.5% of votes was required between 1918 and 1985 to obtain a refund of a candidate's deposit.) Lesley Whittaker and Edward Goldsmith were two of the six who stood in the election.

Constituency	Candidate	Votes	Percentage	Position
Coventry North East	Alan H Pickard	1,332	2.8	3
Coventry North West	Lesley Whittaker	1,542	3.9	3
Eye	Edward Goldsmith	395	0.7	4
Hornchurch	Benjamin Percy-Davies	619	1.3	4
Leeds North East	Clive Lord	300	0.7	4
Liverpool West Derby	D B Pascoe	388	0.9	4

=== October 1974 ===
Membership rose and the party stood five candidates in the October General Election; it cost the party £750. This affected preparations for that election, when PEOPLE's average vote fell to just 0.7%.

Constituency	Candidate	Votes	Percentage	Position
Birmingham Northfield	Elizabeth A. Davenport	359	0.7	4
Coventry North West	Lesley Whittaker	313	0.8	4
Hornchurch	Benjamin Percy-Davies	797	1.8	4
Leeds East	Norma Russell	327	0.7	4
Romford	L. H. C. Sampson	200	0.5	4

== See also ==
- History of the Green Party of England and Wales
- Values Party, considered the first national-level environmental party world-wide
