= Population Matters =

UK-based charity

- Founded: 1991; 35 years ago
- Founder: David Willey
- Type: Environmental charity; Sustainability organisation; Advocacy group
- Purpose: To address the negative consequences of ever more people using ever more of the planet’s resources and to inspire and engage with others to find, share and promote ways to make our vision a reality as quickly as possible.
- Location: United Kingdom
- Method: Campaigning, research and awareness-raising
- Key people: Jonathon Porritt (president); Sara Parkin (chair)
- Website: populationmatters.org
- Formerly called: Optimum Population Trust

Population Matters, formerly known as the Optimum Population Trust, is a UK-based charity that works at the intersection of population, environmental sustainability, and human rights, including women's empowerment and leadership, sexual and reproductive health and rights (SRHR), and international development. The group promotes human rights and ethical, choice-based solutions through research, campaigning and awareness-raising.

== History and background ==
Population Matters was launched as the Optimum Population Trust following a meeting on 24 July 1991 by the late David Willey and others concerned about population numbers and sustainability. They were impelled to act by the failure of United Kingdom governments to respond to population growth and threats to sustainability.

The Optimum Population Trust prepared analyses and lobbied on issues affected by population growth. It was granted charitable status on 9 May 2006. Population Matters was adopted as its new name in 2011.

== Views and aims ==
Population Matters highlights how rapid human population growth has fuelled the destruction of nature and natural resource depletion. The charity promotes positive, voluntary measures to achieve a sustainable human population size that enables everyone to have a decent quality of life while safeguarding our natural environment.

=== Vision ===
Population Matters' vision is of a world in which our human population lives fairly and sustainably with nature and each other.

=== Mission ===
Population Matters' mission is to address the negative consequences of ever more people using ever more of the planet’s resources and to inspire and engage with others to find, share and promote ways to make our vision a reality as quickly as possible.

=== Solutions ===
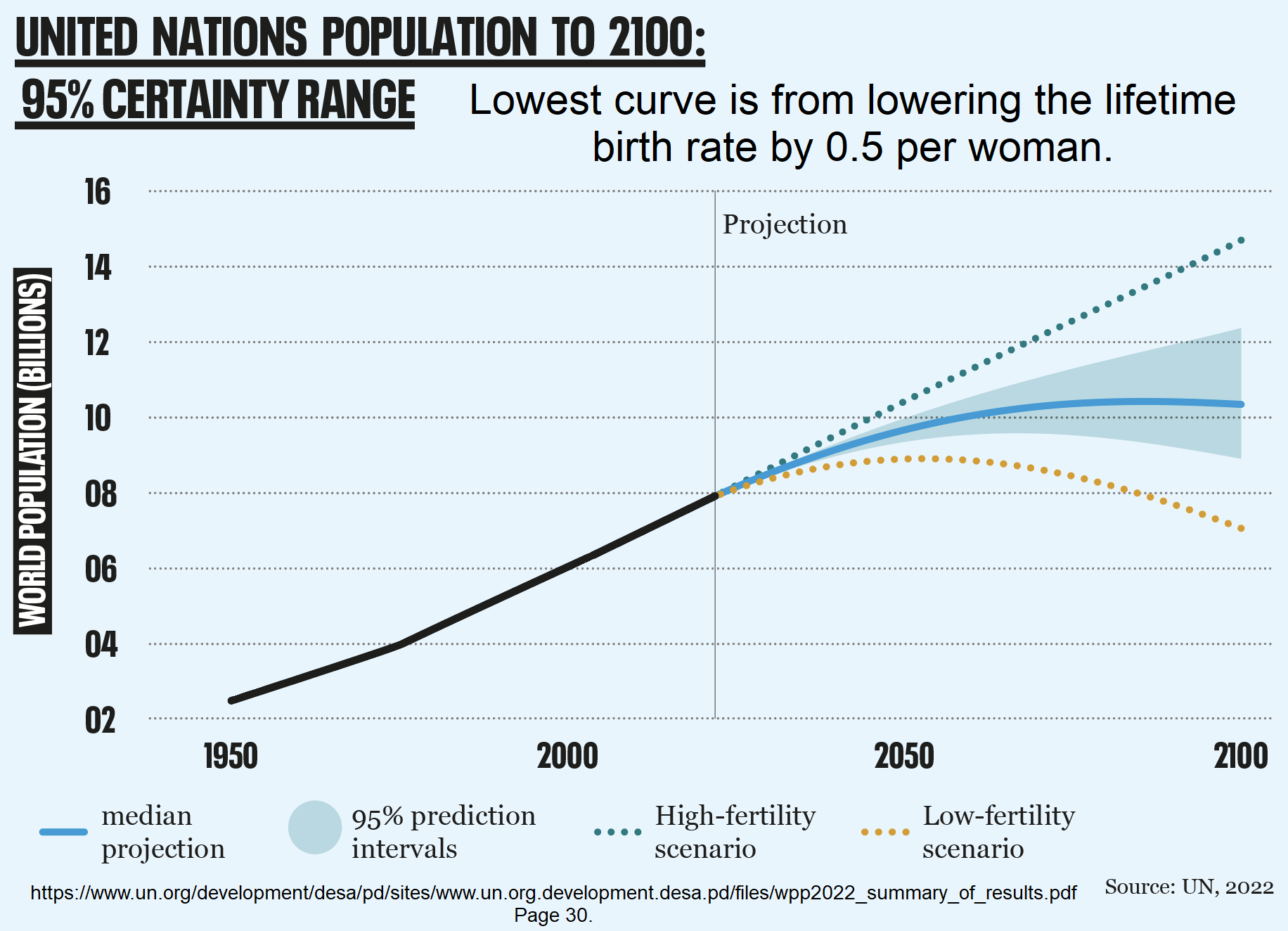
Projections of population growth.

Population Matters promotes various solutions to slow and ultimately reverse population growth:

- Achieve global gender equality
- Remove all barriers to voluntary modern family planning, contraceptives and safe abortion
- Quality and affordable education for all
- Global justice and sustainable economies

In addition, recognising the disproportionately large environmental footprint of wealthy nations, the charity calls for reducing consumption in high-income countries.

== Activities ==
In 2025, Population Matters launched a new five-year strategy (2025–2030), setting out a revised approach to addressing the environmental and social impacts of human population growth, reaffirming the message that "All Populations Matter".

The organisation commits to working “at the intersection of women’s empowerment and leadership, sexual and reproductive health and rights, the environment and population.” It aims to support local and global partners to address the causes and effects of population growth, such as poverty, gender inequality and environmental degradation.

Key initiatives include conducting original research, supporting grassroots projects through the Empower to Plan programme and engaging in advocacy to raise awareness of population dynamics. The strategy also emphasises normalising population discussions in policy and public discourse and affirms a commitment to voluntary, rights-based solutions.

Population Matters financially supports the editorially independent Journal of Population and Sustainability (JP&S) published by The White Horse Press. The JP&S is the only "diamond" open access, peer-reviewed, interdisciplinary journal exploring all aspects of the relationship between human numbers and environmental issues.

Population Matters is a member of the International Union for Conservation of Nature (IUCN), has consultative status at the United Nations Economic and Social Council (ECOSOC), and is a member of the Wellbeing Economy Alliance.

== Organisational structure ==
Population Matters consists of an operational team of staff and a board of trustees, who oversee the work and strategy. An Expert Advisory Group provides guidance on key issues and the organisation's patrons provide endorsement and support. The Chair of the Board is Sara Parkin OBE, and Jonathan Porritt is the organisation's President.

=== Patrons ===
Population Matters' patrons are prominent public figures who are concerned about the impacts of human population growth, including Sir David Attenborough, Chris Packham, Leilani Münter, Sir Partha Dasgupta, Professor Paul Ehrlich, Professor John Guillebaud and the late Dr. Jane Goodall,.

== Immigration ==
In 2015, Population Matters published a blog post disagreeing with an Amnesty International call on the UK and other EU countries to "significantly increase the number of resettlement and humanitarian admission places for refugees from Syria" while saying that these "countries should continue to support migrants from the Syrian civil war and other conflicts in the countries adjacent to those conflicts". The organization subsequently confirmed that this had never been official Population Matters policy and had been repudiated and withdrawn. The Optimum Population Trust had called for numerically balanced or "zero-net" migration to the UK, but did not continue to support this policy as Population Matters.

== Child Benefit Cap ==
In 2015, Population Matters advocated stopping child benefit and tax credits for third and subsequent children. In 2017, the organization stopped advocating for specific policy changes, replacing them with a call for a Sustainable Population Policy. In 2024, they reaffirmed their opposition to the policy.

== See also ==
- Overconsumption (economics)
- Population density
- Zero population growth
