= Sara Parkin =

British politician

Sara Parkin OBE

Personal details
- Born: Sara Lamb Parkin; April 9, 1946 (age 80) Aberdeen, Scotland
- Party: Green Party of England and Wales (1990–1992)
- Other political affiliations: Green Party UK (1976–1990)
- Spouse: Donald Parkin (m. 1969)
- Parents: George Lamb McEwan; Mairie Munro Rankin

Sara Parkin OBE (born 9 April 1946) is a Scottish nurse and political activist. She started her working life as a nurse in Edinburgh but rose to prominence as a green political activist during and after the 1989 European Parliament election, in which the UK Green Party gained 15% of the votes but no seats. She resigned from the party in 1992, at odds with the party's anti-leadership stance, and went on to found the Forum for the Future with Jonathon Porritt, Chris Baines and Paul Ekins. Her current campaigning focus is sustainability literacy as an essential outcome of formal education, especially in universities and colleges. She lives in Hackney, East London.

== Early life and education ==
Sara Parkin was born in Aberdeen to George Lamb McEwan and Mairie Munro Rankin. She was educated in Coventry at Green Lane Primary School and Barr's Hill Grammar School. She then trained as a nurse at Royal Infirmary of Edinburgh (1970–74).

== Career ==
Parkin worked there as a ward sister at the Royal Infirmary. There, she met her husband Max, and her children Colin and Douglas were born there. She tutored undergraduates in nursing at the University of Edinburgh (1972-3) and worked elsewhere in the health sector in the 1970s and 1980s before turning to politics.

=== Politics ===
On moving to Leeds in 1976, Parkin discovered the Ecology Party (as the UK Green Party was then known). She stood unsuccessfully against Keith Joseph in the 1979 general election and in several local elections. When her husband's work as a cancer epidemiologist took the family to live in Lyon France, she became involved with the international growth of green politics. This including leading on the establishment of the Coordination of (European) Green Parties (a grouping now known as the European Green Party for which she acted as Co-secretary and Spokesperson until 1991. With activists in other European Green Parties she provided support for green-oriented parties around the world, including dissident movements in east Europe.

Parkin emerged as one of the most articulate and telegenic Green Party spokespersons after 1989, credited with being committed to Green Party policy and practical in terms of political tactics. Caroline Lucas remembers being “exhausted in the office and she’d burst through the door and bring with her new thoughts and ideas” while journalist Walter Schwartz considered her “the party’s best all-rounder, the easiest of the Greens to imagine as a Cabinet Minister. She is a highly organised political animal. Most Greens are not.”

After an exploratory approach by the Labour Party, Parkin was defeated in her attempt at the 1989 Green Party conference to secure agreement to open negotiations with other parties on an alliance to bring in a proportional election system.

She was also associated with Green 2000, a group advocating constitutional changes to the Green Party, including the creation of an Executive Committee, with a Chair, a Regional Council, and only two principal speakers (Immediately after the 1989 election 32 speakers were offered to the press). The party voted to agree these changes, electing a Green 2000 supporter to every post, and Sara Parkin as Chair. This organisational structure is still in place.

The 1992 general election results were not good for the Green Party largely because of predictions of a hung parliament, but also because of the ongoing internal disarray of the Green Party. Parkin resigned before the 1992 Green Party Conference citing the party's refusal to sanction what was openly described as a campaign “to harry the (Green 2000) leadership at every opportunity until its members simply gave up in despair and quit.”

The harrying persisted at the conference itself, with the last straw proving the party's ‘open door’ to the controversial David Icke.

Green Parties: An international guide, which Parkin published early in 1989 is out of print, but remains a benchmark study of green politics at that time. Her 1994 biography of her friend, German Green Party leader Petra Kelly The life and death of Petra Kelly is published in several languages most recently in 2016 in Spanish. Parkin remains an advocate of Green Parties, arguing consistently for the need to organise for success and the importance to that of good leadership.

=== Life after politics ===
Frustration in the aftermath of the 1992 UN Earth Summit led many UK green movement activists to think about different ways of implementing more sustainable ways of living and working. Parkin joined up with other former Green Party activists Paul Ekins, Chris Baines and Jonathon Porritt to create in 1996 the Forum for the Future, a registered charity and non-profit with a mission to promote sustainable development through working in partnership with business, government and other organisations.

For the Forum Parkin designed a pioneering Masters course in Leadership for Sustainable Development and worked mainly with education sector, government and the professions, particularly engineering, over 20 years to promote sustainability literacy in universities and colleges. Her 2010 book Positive Deviant: Sustainability Leadership in a perverse world, based on this experience is a course book in several universities around the world. She stepped down from day to day involvement with the Forum in 2016, but remains a Trustee.

During this time, she also served on boards of the Environment Agency for England and Wales, the Natural Environment Research Council, the Leadership Foundation for Higher Education, the European Training Foundation and, at various times, NGOs such as Friends of the Earth, New Economics Foundation and Groundwork.

Parkin continues to work with in education through The Sustainability Literacy Project, for which she is a Principal Associate. She also advises the National Union of Students on sustainability, and sits on the Boards of the Higher Education Academy and the Carnegie Trust for the Universities of Scotland.

She is also chair of the board of trustees of Population Matters and a patron of The Museum of Islay Life, Chair of the Richard Sandbrook Trust and Trustee of the St Andrews Prize for the Environment.

== Awards and honours ==
Sara Parkin was appointed an OBE in 2000 for her services to education and sustainability, and holds honorary positions with several organisations, including the Institute of Energy, the Institution of Civil Engineers, the Engineering Council and the Society for the Environment. She has 11 honorary degrees.

== Selected works ==
- Parkin S (1989) Green Parties: An international guide London: Heretic Books
- Parkin S (ed) (1991) Green Light on Europe London: Heretic Books
- Parkin S (1991) Green Futures: Agenda for the 21st century London:Fount
- Parkin S (1994) The Life and Death of Petra Kelly London:Pandora
- Parkin S (2010) The Positive Deviant: Sustainability leadership in a perverse world London: Earthscan

Party political offices
Preceded by Mallen Baker, John Laker and Judy Maciejowska	Chair of the Green Party of England and Wales; 1991–1993; With: John Laker and John Norris (1991–1992)	Succeeded by John Norris
