= Association of Socialist Greens =

UK Green Party faction

The Association of Socialist Greens was a political ginger group, often called a faction, founded by Derek Wall and others following the Socialist Conference organised by Tony Benn in the year after the 1987 UK general election. It became involved in responses to attempts to organise the UK Green Party (now the Green Party of England and Wales) on more conventional lines in the 1980s. It ran a newsletter known as The Way Ahead (Green newsletter). It later became the Socialist Green Federation.

It is not affiliated with the more recently created Green Left, of which Wall is also a founding member.

== See also ==
- Eco-socialism
