= Jonathon Porritt =

British environmentalist (born 1950)

The Honourable Sir Jonathon Porritt Bt CBE
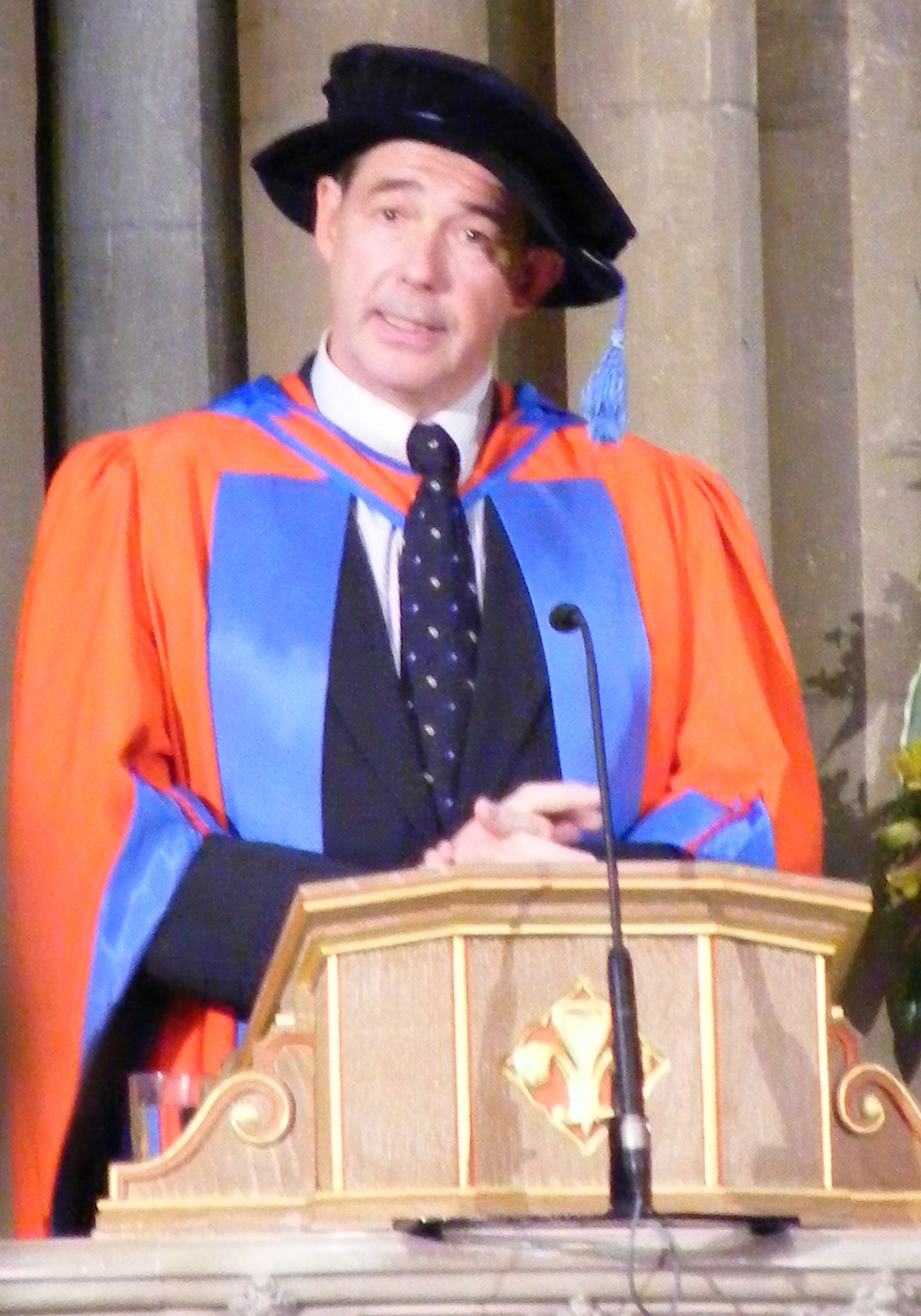
- Porritt receiving an honorary degree from the University of Exeter in 2008
- Born: 6 July 1950 (age 76); London, England
- Education: University of Oxford
- Occupation: Environmentalism
- Awards: CBE (2000)
- Website: jonathonporritt.com

Sir Jonathon Espie Porritt, 2nd Baronet, CBE (born 6 July 1950) is a British environmentalist and writer. He is known for his advocacy of the Green Party of England and Wales. Porritt frequently contributes to magazines, newspapers and books, and appears on radio and television.

== Early life ==
Jonathon Porritt was born in London, the son of Arthur Porritt, Baron Porritt, 11th Governor-General of New Zealand and his second wife, Kathleen Peck. Lord Porritt, who served as a senior officer in the Royal Army Medical Corps during World War II, was also the bronze medalist in the 1924 Summer Olympics "Chariots of Fire" 100 metres race. As well as receiving a life peerage, Lord Porritt had previously been awarded a baronetcy in 1963. Jonathon Porritt therefore became the 2nd Baronet on Lord Porritt's death on 1 January 1994.

Porritt was educated at Wellesley House School, Broadstairs, Kent; Eton College; and Magdalen College, University of Oxford, where he earned a first-class degree in modern languages.

Porritt started training as a barrister, but switched to teaching English at St Clement Danes Grammar School (later Burlington Danes School) in Shepherd's Bush, west London, in 1974. He taught there from 1974 to 1984, serving as Head of English from 1980 to 1984.

== Environmental and political involvement ==
External videos
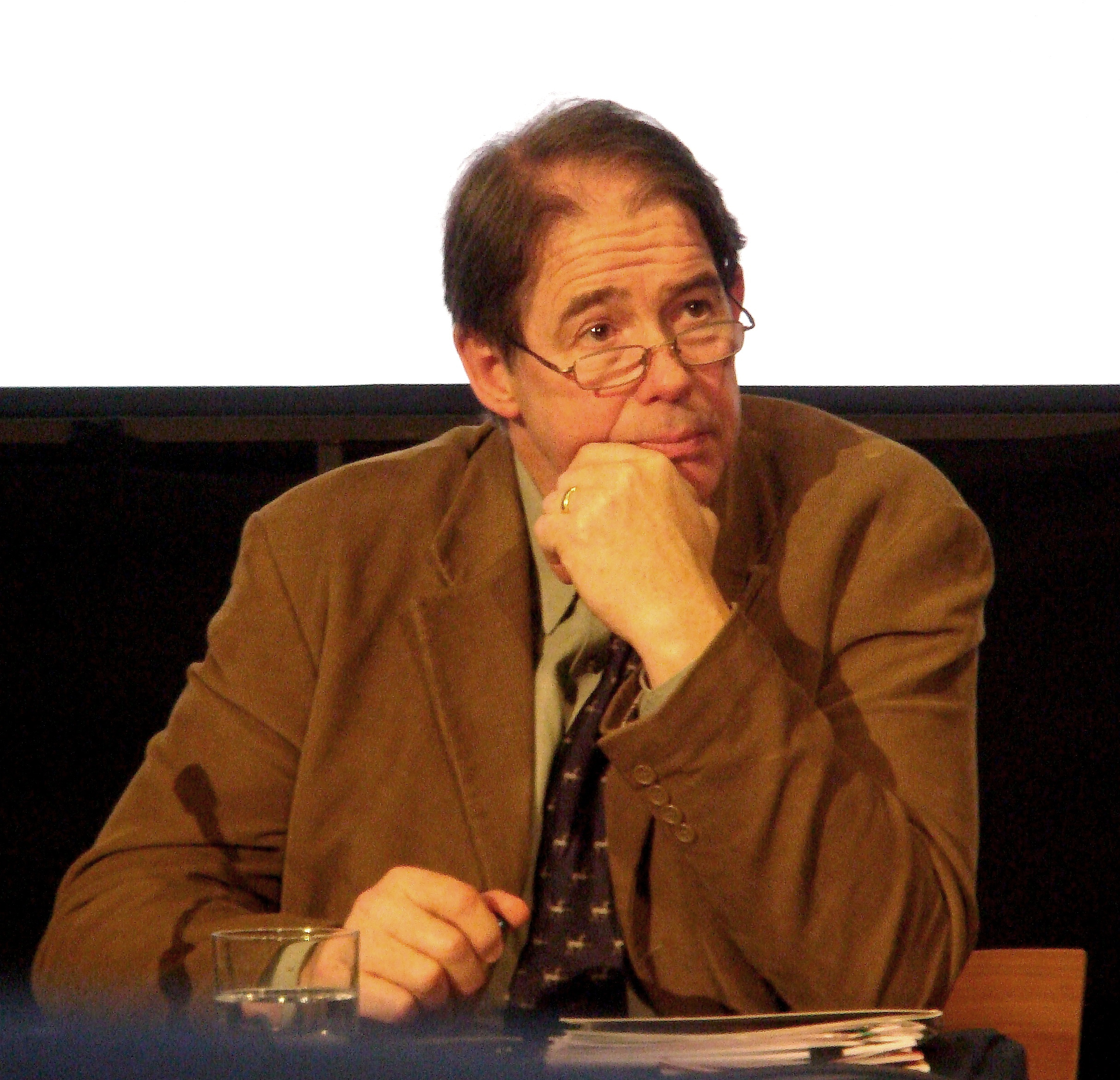
- Jonathon Porritt: video interview, The Guardian, 2012
- "Sustainability for All", Jonathon Porritt at TEDxExeter, 2013
- Jonathon Porritt on population, Population Matters, 2013

=== The Green Party ===
In the 1970s and early 1980s, Porritt was a prominent member of the Ecology Party (the predecessor to the Green Party of England and Wales). Porritt served as chair of The Ecology Party from 1979 to 1980, and from 1982 to 1984. He presided over changes that made the party much more prominent in elections, himself standing as a parliamentary candidate in general elections in 1979 and 1983. In 1979, he achieved 2.8% of the vote in St Marylebone, and in 1983, he achieved 2.1% in Kensington, receiving attention from national media. Under his stewardship, membership grew from a few hundred to around 3,000.

In 1984, Porritt published his first book, Seeing Green: Politics of Ecology Explained. It was written while he was policy director of the Ecology Party. As of 1999, it was still described as "the best general guide to the politics of ecology by an 'insider'". Reviewed nearly 30 years after its publication, it stands up as "prophetic in many respects", although somewhat off in the timing of its predictions, perhaps in part because Porritt did not anticipate the rise of indebtedness. Writing before the rise of the internet, Porritt even predicted the development of an "information-rich, knowledge-poor" age.

The Greens achieved 15% of the European Parliamentary vote in 1989, but were able to win only 1.2% of the vote in the 1992 general election, in which environmental issues were largely ignored. During this time, Porritt became a strong public advocate of change in the now Green Party of England and Wales. Along with Sara Parkin, he advocated for a more professional organisation with identifiable leaders, a change that was eventually approved.

In 1992, Porritt backed the election of Cynog Dafis, who was elected to Parliament as the joint Plaid Cymru-Green MP for Ceredigion. However, in 1994, the regional council of the Green Party suspended Porritt for supporting Dafis, and demanded that Dafis stop identifying himself as Green.

Between 1996 and 2009, Porritt largely withdrew from active party politics, concentrating instead on non-partisan and activist roles independent of the Green Party.

In March 2009, Porritt spoke at the launch of the South West Green Party European Election campaign in Bristol, stating that he had always remained a member of the Green Party and that it was the correct time to reaffirm his support. He noted that many of the policies in the Ecology Party's manifesto of 1979 were now accepted by mainstream political parties, and emphasized the importance of active support.

"Every single one of the issues that the Green Party has been campaigning on for the last 35 years is getting worse and worse, which means that people should no longer put off the day when they accept that the future is either Green or not at all." Porritt, 2009

Prior to the 2015 general election, he was one of several public figures who endorsed the parliamentary candidacy of the Green Party's Caroline Lucas.

=== Friends of the Earth ===
In 1984, Porritt gave up teaching to become Director of Friends of the Earth in Britain, a post he held until 1990. Although criticized initially as inexperienced, in the long term he has been seen as an important factor in the group's success in the late 1980s. He edited the Friends of the Earth Handbook (1987) and encouraged Friends of the Earth to promote practical solutions in its local environmental campaigns, as well as thinking more globally and internationally. During his time as director, the membership of the organization expanded from 12,700 to 226,300.

Looking back in 2012, Porritt stated that becoming director of Friends of the Earth "was probably the best decision of my life". However, his affection for the organization has not stopped him from harshly criticizing it, as he did in 2015, when the group's top ten priority issues list did not include nuclear power.

=== Beyond Agenda 21 ===
Porritt attended the United Nations Conference on Environment and Development (UNCED) in Rio de Janeiro in 1992, eventually writing an introduction for The way forward : beyond Agenda 21 (1997). From 1993 to 1996, he chaired Stakeholder Forum for a Sustainable Future, then known as United Nations Environment and Development UK (UNED UK). The organization encourages international stakeholders to engage in decision-making for sustainable development.

=== Forum for the Future ===
With Sara Parkin and Paul Ekins, Porritt founded Forum for the Future in 1996, a sustainable development charity. The nonprofit offers advice on sustainability planning to multinational companies, including Kellogg's and Unilever.

After founding Forum of the Future, Porritt largely withdrew from party politics to concentrate on non-partisan political work.

=== Sustainable Development Commission ===
In 2000, Porritt was appointed the inaugural chair of the incoming Labour government's Sustainable Development Commission (SDC), set up by prime minister Tony Blair. He was reappointed twice for three-year terms, the last of which began on 26 July 2006. From 2000 to 2009, Porritt chaired the SDC. He was, however, critical of the Labour government for its environmental record and its pro-nuclear stance, and has campaigned against nuclear power.

While at SDC, Porritt encouraged the work of economist Tim Jackson, whose SDC report Prosperity Without Growth was later published as a book under the same title. Since retiring from the SDC in September 2009, Porritt has publicly supported the report's analysis of economic growth as it relates to environmental and human well-being, and the potential for a sustainable economy.

The Sustainable Development Commission closed on 31 March 2011.

=== Population Matters ===
Porritt is a patron of the population concern charity Population Matters, formerly known as the Optimum Population Trust. Porritt has stated that population growth is a serious threat to the global environment and that family planning, including both birth control and abortion, is a part of the answer to global warming. He recommends that people should have no more than two children. Porritt has asserted that "promotion of reproductive health is one of the most progressive forms of intervention" that could be used to reduce carbon emissions.

Porritt's views are based in part on a 2009 report by Thomas Wire at the London School of Economics, commissioned by Optimum Population Trust. It compared the cost-effectiveness of access to family planning with other interventions such as low-carbon technologies, and concluded that access to family planning, by decreasing population and the subsequent human carbon footprint, could have a substantial impact on global warming. Similar views are supported by other researchers and international organizations.

Porritt's remarks on the subject in 2009 caused outrage among anti-abortionists and some religious leaders. Porritt was also criticized for praising China for its one-child family policy, which has reduced birth rates but is described as coercive, cruel and causing "immeasurable suffering". Although the Green Party, Population Matters and other organizations assert that they only support voluntary use of family planning, calls for population control raise fears that it will be coercively used in ways that infringe human rights. Porritt remained definite about his position.

"I am unapologetic about asking people to connect up their own responsibility for their total environmental footprint and how they decide to procreate and how many children they think are appropriate... I think we will work our way towards a position that says that having more than two children is irresponsible." Porritt, 2009

Environmental commentator George Monbiot, who also uses carbon emissions for ecological footprinting, has criticized Porritt's emphasis on family planning. He asserts that radical family planning will have little impact unless people limit their consumption. "People might populate less as they become richer, but they do not consume less; rather they consume more. That is, as the habits of the super-rich show, there are no limits to human extravagance." The carbon footprint of people in poorer countries has been shown to be much lower than that in wealthy countries. Increasing availability to contraceptive usage in poor countries, although it may have decrease population growth in those countries, may therefore do little to limit carbon impact. Porritt argues that this does not lessen the responsibility of wealthy countries to address population, asserting that population affects both the rich and poor worlds, and that "Every country needs a population strategy, including the US and the UK."

Porritt is also an advisor to Project Drawdown, which "maps, measures, models, and describes the 100 most substantive solutions to global warming". Among the top ten solutions, according to Project Drawdown, are the education of women and the availability of family planning services.

=== Other activities ===
Porritt served as chairman of Sustainability South-West, the South-West Round Table for Sustainable Development in England, from 1999 to 2001, and later as president.

Porritt served as a trustee of the World Wildlife Fund (UK) from 1991 to 2005. Porritt is on the advisory board of BBC Wildlife magazine and actively supports the efforts of experts promoting renewable energy and sustainable development such as Walt Patterson.

Porritt is an endorser of the Forests Now Declaration, presented at the United Nations Framework Convention on Climate Change (UNFCCC) meeting, held in Bali in December 2007. The Declaration calls for new market based carbon policies and reforms to prioritize the protection of tropical forests. Porritt has strongly criticized proposals by the UK government to sell off Britain's remaining 635,000 acres of public woodlands, and helped to form the organization Our Forests in 2012 to protect and expand public and private woodlands throughout England.

Porritt acts as advisor to many bodies on environmental matters, as well as to individuals including Prince Charles.

His best-selling book Capitalism: As if the World Matters was originally published in 2005, and revised and republished by Earthscan in September 2007. In it, he argues that capitalism must be controlled and redirected to create a sustainable world.

In line with this view, Porritt has worked to encourage businesses to move towards sustainability. As of 2004, Porritt became a Trustee of the Ashden Awards for Sustainable Energy. In 2005, he became a Non-Executive Director of Wessex Water, and in 2008, he became a non-executive director for the Willmott Dixon Group. Porritt also serves on the Sustainable Retail Advisory Board for Marks & Spencer, advising the company on its long-term sustainability strategy.

Porritt is a convenor of the cross-party political movement More United.

Porritt's book The World We Made (2013) is a futurist account of how the world will have changed by 2050, noted for both its comprehensiveness and optimism.

In August 2025, Porritt was arrested in Parliament Square, Westminster after displaying support for Palestine Action, which had recently been proscribed by the British government as a terrorist organisation; he was arrested again, in Bristol in November, under similar circumstances.

== Personal life ==
In 1985 he married Sarah Staniforth CBE, daughter of Malcolm Arthur Staniforth.

== Honours and awards ==
In 2000, Jonathon Porritt was appinted a Commander of the Most Excellent Order of the British Empire (CBE).

Porritt became an honorary Doctor of Laws of the University of Sussex in 2000. Porritt received an Honorary Doctorate from Heriot-Watt University in 2001. In July 2008, he became an honorary graduate of the University of Exeter. In 2009, he received an honorary degree of Doctor of Science from Loughborough University.

He was Chancellor of Keele University from 2012 to 2022.

== Arms ==
Coat of arms of Jonathon Porritt
Notes The arms of The Hon. Jonathon Porritt were originally granted to his father. They consist of: Crest On a wreath Or and Gules, a demi Heraldic Antelope Gules armed Azure collared Or, holding a Torch of the last enflamed proper between two Fern Fronds Vert Escutcheon Or, a serpent in bend vert between two lions' heads erased gules, on a chief of the last two swords points upwards in saltire of the first, between as many roses argent both surmounted by another gules barbed and seeded proper Motto Sapienter et fortiter ferre

== Bibliography ==
=== Books ===
- Porritt, Jonathon (1984), Seeing Green: Politics of Ecology Explained (Seeing green ed.), Oxford, UK: B. Blackwell, ISBN 978-0631138921
- Jonathon Porritt; David Winner (1988), The coming of the Greens, London: Fontana, ISBN 978-0006372448, OL 17962277M
- Jonathon Porritt (1990), Green alternatives in a troubled world, Salford: University of Salford, OL 19496395M
- Porritt, Jonathon (1990), Where on Earth Are We Going?, London: BBC Books, ISBN 978-0563208471, OCLC 24750762, OL 21710100M
- Porritt, Jonathon, Captain Eco and the Fate of the Earth, Dorling Kindersley Publishers Ltd, ISBN 978-0863187032
- Jonathon Porritt (1995), Liberty and Sustainability: Where One Person's Freedom is Another's Nuisance, John Stuart Mill Institute, ISBN 9781871952087, OCLC 45855524, OL 12076254M
- Jonathon Porritt (1 January 2000), Playing Safe: Science and the Environment, Thames & Hudson, Inc., ISBN 9780500280737
- Porritt, Jonathon (2005), Capitalism as if the world matters, Sterling, VA: Earthscan, ISBN 978-1844071920, OL 3405876M
- Porritt, Jonathon (2013), The World We Made, Phaidon, ISBN 9780714863610
- Porritt, Jonathon (2020), Hope in Hell, Simon & Schuster UK, ISBN 9781471193279

=== Articles ===
- Jonathon Porritt (1997), Competing against the environment, London: Lloyds TSB Group, OL 18079793M
- Hilton, Isabel, and Jonathon Porritt. "Sustainable-development-s-taboo-territory- Sustainable development's 'taboo territory'" chinadialogue. 2007-05-30.
- Perrement, Matt. "Interview with Jonathon Porritt: Sustainable development needs China." chinadialogue. 2006-09-19.
- Porritt, Jonathon. "China could lead the fight for a cooler climate." chinadialogue. 2007-11-13.
- Porritt, Jonathon. "China: the most important story in the world." chinadialogue. 2006-09-18.

== See also ==
- Forum for the Future
- Green Party of England and Wales
- Sustainable Development Commission
- Sustrans

Party political offices
Preceded by Jonathan Tyler	Chair of the Ecology Party; 1979 – 1980	Succeeded by Gundula Dorey
Preceded by Gundula Dorey	Co-Chair of the Ecology Party; 1982 – 1984; With: Jean Lambert; Alec Pontin (1982 – 1983); Paul Ekins (1983 – 1984)	Succeeded by Paul Ekins; Jean Lambert
Baronetage of the United Kingdom
Preceded by Arthur Porritt	Baronet (of Hampstead); 1994–present	Incumbent
Academic offices
Preceded by Professor Sir David Weatherall	Chancellor of Keele University; 2012–2022	Succeeded by James Timpson
