= Forum for the Future =

Forum for the Future is an international sustainability organisation that works in partnership with business, government and civil society to try to accelerate change toward a just and regenerative future. It works by catalysing change in key global systems (energy, food and business). It has an annual turnover of around £5.2 million and employs 66 staff. The current CEO is Hannah Pathak, Executive Director and Chief Acceleration Officer is Sally Uren OBE and the offices are based in the United Kingdom, United States, India and Singapore.

It runs partnerships with more than 100 organisations across business and the public sector to incorporate the principles of sustainable development.

From 1996 to 2016 the organisation ran a Masters course, 'Masters in Leadership for Sustainable Development'. This was run in partnership with the University of Middlesex and the Leadership Trust. Forum set up the School of System Change, a learning provider with offerings for mid-career professionals to learn how to become systems change-makers.

Forum for the Future was founded in 1996, by Paul Ekins, Sara Parkin and Jonathon Porritt. Its earliest members from 1996 to 1999 included Sir David Putnam, Richard Branson, Richard Rogers, John Selwyn Gummer, Dr Elaine Storkey, and Douglas Adams.

== Publications ==
From 2023 onwards:

- For a just and regenerative future – Forum for the Future’s 2023-2025 strategy, by Forum for the Future 2022
- Supply Chain Synergies – What is the appropriate role of supply chains in achieving responsible production at farm level?, by Forum for the Future, in partnership with the Oxford Farming Conference (OFC), Savills and WWF, commissioned by Oxford Farming Conference 2023
- Tackling Microfibres at Source: Investigating opportunities to reduce microfibre pollution from the fashion industry through textile design and manufacturing innovation, by Forum for the Future 2023
- Renewable Energy to Responsible Energy: A Call to Action by Forum for the Future 2023
- New pathways to a just and regenerative food system in Southeast Asia, by Forum for the Future 2023
- Scaling regenerative agriculture in the UK: Accelerating change through collaboration, by Forum for the Future 2023
- Integrating Social and Environmental Sustainability: A practical playbook to drive impact and unlock business benefit, by Forum for the Future 2023
- Cotton 2040 Impact Report, by Forum for the Future 2023
- Call to Action: Responsible Energy Initiative Philippines, by Forum for the Future 2024
- Agroecology, Southeast Asia's Protein Transition, and the Role of Finance, by Forum for the Future and GROW Accelerator 2024
- Business Guide to Advancing Climate Justice, by Forum for the Future and B Lab U.S. and Canada 2024
- Policy as a Route to Cleaner Air: Why a Systemic, Cross-Sector Approach Matters, by Forum for the Future 2024
- Powerful Futures: Practitioner Insights on the Just Transition to Renewable Energy, by Forum for the Future and JustRE, the Global South Alliance for a Just Transition to Renewable Energy 2024
- Future Food Trajectories, by Forum for the Future 2024
- Enabling Systemic Circularity in Fashion - Phase 1 report, by Forum for the Future 2025

Forum also has an annual campaign for the Future of Sustainability (FoS), by the Futures Centre. Its publications include:

- The Future of Sustainability 2024/25: Reimagining the Way the World Works
- The Future of Sustainability 2023: Courage to Transform
- The Future of Sustainability 2022: Looking Back to Go Forward
