= Antisemitism in the United Kingdom =

Antisemitism in the United Kingdom has existed throughout the history of the United Kingdom since its initial formation in 1707. Prior to that, Jews in England had experienced antisemitism – discrimination and persecution as Jews – since a Jewish community was first established in England in 1070. They experienced a series of massacres in the Medieval period, which culminated in their expulsion from England in 1290. They were later readmitted by Oliver Cromwell in 1655.

By the 1800s, an increasing toleration of religious minorities gradually helped to eliminate legal restrictions on public employment and political representation. However, Jewish financiers were seen by some as holding disproportionate influence on British government policy, particularly concerning the British Empire and foreign affairs.

Significant Jewish migration from Eastern Europe in the years prior to World War I saw some antisemitic opposition, which would result in increasingly restrictive immigration laws. An emerging fascist movement in the 1930s, which launched antisemitic campaigns, was accompanied by a government policy of restricting the inflow of Jewish refugees from Nazi controlled territories. Notwithstanding sympathy for the Jews following the Holocaust, immigration controls to Mandatory Palestine were maintained, while Zionist attacks on British forces in Palestine caused some resentment and would trigger anti-Jewish riots in 1947. In the second half of the 20th century, while the Jewish community became generally accepted, antisemitic sentiment persisted within British fascist and other far-right groups as well as Islamist groups.

== History ==
Prior to the creation of the United Kingdom, Scotland had no history of persecuting Jews - indeed the 1320 Declaration of Arbroath made reference to equality of Jews stating that "there is neither weighing nor distinction of Jew and Greek, Scotsman or Englishman" in the eyes of God. - whereas England had a long history of persecution, massacres and expulsion of Jews.

=== 11th to 13th centuries in England: Persecution and expulsion ===
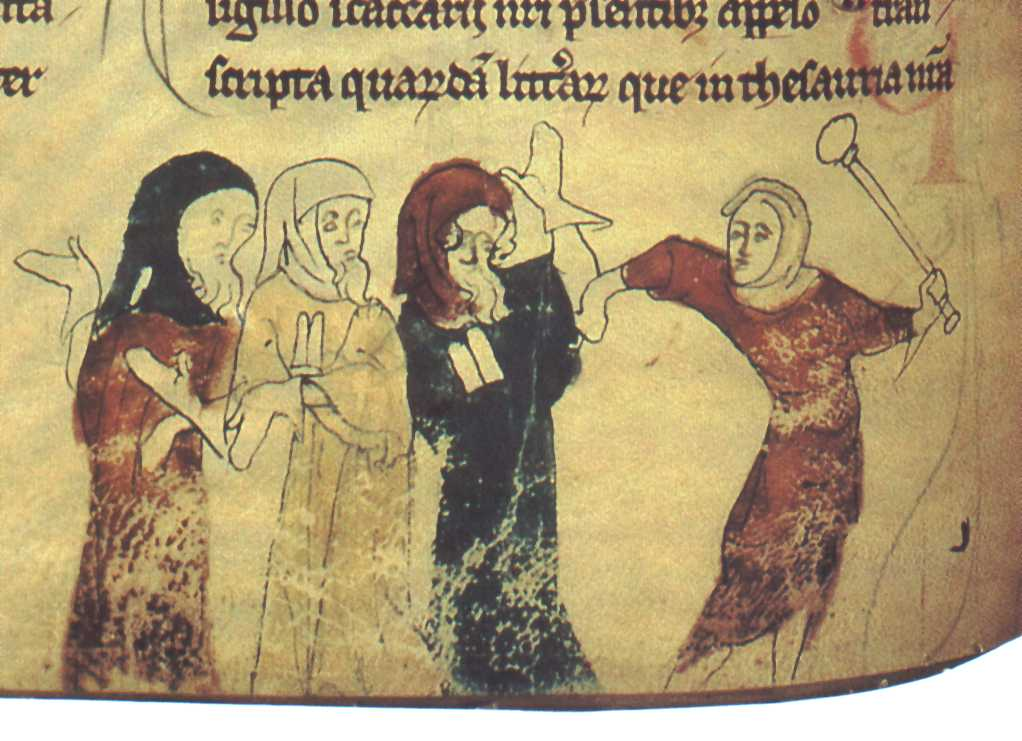
One of the earliest images of Jews being persecuted in Britain from the 13th century

Jews arrived in the Kingdom of England following the Norman Conquest in 1066. The earliest Jewish settlement was documented in about 1070. Jews living in England from around King Stephen's reign (reigned 1135–1154) experienced religious discrimination, while Jewish moneylending activity was strictly controlled and heavily taxed. It is thought that the blood libel which accused Jews of ritual murder originated in England in the 12th century: examples include Harold of Gloucester, Little Saint Hugh of Lincoln, Robert of Bury and William of Norwich. In 1181, the Assize of Arms forbade Jews from owning a hauberk or chain mail. The York Massacre of 1190, one of a series of massacres of Jews across England, resulted in an estimated 150 Jews taking their own lives or being immolated. The earliest recorded images of antisemitism are found in the Royal tax records from 1233.

In 1253, Henry III enacted the Statute of Jewry, placing a range of restrictions on Jews, including segregation and the wearing of a yellow badge. Its practical application is not recorded. In 1264–7, the Second Barons' War included a further series of massacres of Jews, with the objective of destroying the records of debts held by moneylenders. In 1275, Edward I enacted the similar Statute of the Jewry, which included the outlawing of usury. The first dated portrait of an English Jew is the 1277 antisemitic caricature Aaron, Son of the Devil, in which he wears the English yellow badge (two tablets) on his upper garments. After being expelled from a number of towns during previous decades, this early Jewish presence in England ended with King Edward I's Edict of Expulsion in 1290. Subsequently, converted Jews were allowed to live in the Domus Conversorum (house of the converted) with records up to at least 1551.

=== 17th century in England: Readmittance ===
Jews were readmitted to the Commonwealth of England by Oliver Cromwell in 1655, though it is believed that crypto-Jews lived in England prior to then. Jews were subjected to discrimination and humiliation, which waxed and waned over the centuries, gradually decreasing as Jews made commercial, philanthropic and sporting contributions to the country.

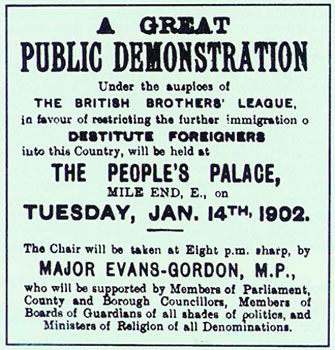
British Brothers' League poster, from 1902, aiming at stemming Jewish immigration to the East End of London

However, Jews were restricted by laws aimed primarily at Catholics and nonconformists, such as the Corporation Act 1661 and other Test Acts, which restricted public offices in England to members of the Church of England.

=== 18th and 19th centuries in the United Kingdom: emancipation ===
The Jewish Naturalisation Act, which allowed Jews to become naturalised by application to Parliament, received royal assent on 7 July 1753 but was repealed in 1754 due to widespread opposition to its provisions. For the purpose of Catholic emancipation, the test acts were repealed in 1828 but replaced by George IV with the Oath of Abjuration Act, which declared an oath of abjuration, containing the words "upon the faith of a Christian," to be necessary for all officers, civil or military, under the crown or in the universities, and for all lawyers, voters, and members of Parliament.

Despite these restrictions, it has been suggested by William D. Rubinstein that antisemitism was lower in the United Kingdom than in a number of other European countries and that this was so for a number of reasons: Protestants shared with Jews an emphasis on the Old Testament, a self-perception as a chosen people with a direct covenant with God, and a distrust of Catholicism; with fewer Jews in the UK, Jews had a lesser commercial and financial role than in some other countries, reducing both real and perceived conflicts, and; Britain's early adoption of constitutional government with liberal principles acted to promote individual and civil liberties. In 1846, at the insistence of Irish leader Daniel O'Connell, the obsolete 1275 law, "De Judaismo", was repealed. There continued to be opposition to emancipation from figures such as Thomas Carlyle who believed that all Jews should be expelled to Palestine, disliking what he perceived as Jews' materialism and archaic forms of religion. In 1858, the Jews Relief Act 1858 removed the restriction of the oath of office for the Parliament to Christians, allowing Jews to become MPs. In 1871, the Universities Tests Act abolished the requirement for university staff and students to be adherents of the Church of England. In 1890, under the Religious Disabilities Removal Bill, all restrictions for every position in the British Empire were removed being thrown open to every British subject without distinction of creed, except for that of monarch and the offices of Lord High Chancellor and of Lord Lieutenant of Ireland.

=== 1900s to 1920s: Finance and immigration ===
During the Second Boer War (1899–1902), some opposed to the war asserted that Jewish gold mining operators and financiers with their large stakes in South Africa were a driving force behind it, with Labour leader Keir Hardie asserting that Jews were part of a secretive "imperialist" cabal that promoted war. The Independent Labour Party, Robert Blatchford's newspaper The Clarion, and the Trades Union Congress all blamed "Jewish capitalists" as "being behind the war and imperialism in general". John Burns, a Liberal Party socialist, speaking in the House of Commons in 1900, asserted that the British Army itself had become "a janissary of the Jews". Henry Hyndman also argued that "Jewish bankers" and "imperialist Judaism" were the cause of the conflict. J. A. Hobson held similar views. According to one historian, "The Jew baiting at the time of the Boer War and the Marconi scandal was linked to a broader protest, mounted in the main by the Radical wing of the Liberal Party, against the growing visibility of successful businessmen in national life and the challenges. What were seen as traditional English values."

From 1882 to 1919, Jewish numbers in Britain increased fivefold, from 46,000 to 250,000, due to the exodus from Russian pogroms and discrimination, many of whom settled in the East End of London. By the turn of the century, a popular and media backlash had begun. The British Brothers' League was formed, with the support of prominent politicians, organising marches and petitions. At rallies, its speakers said that Britain should not become "the dumping ground for the scum of Europe". In 1905, an editorial in the Manchester Evening Chronicle wrote "that the dirty, destitute, diseased, verminous and criminal foreigner who dumps himself on our soil and rates simultaneously, shall be forbidden to land". Antisemitism broke out into violence in South Wales in 1902 and 1903 where Jews were assaulted. One of the main objectives of the Aliens Act in 1905 was to control such immigration. Restrictions were increased in the Aliens Restriction Act 1914 and the immigration laws of 1919.

In addition to anti-immigration campaigners, there were antisemitic groups, notably The Britons, launched in 1919, which called for British Jews to be deported en masse to Palestine. In 1920, the Morning Post published over 17 or 18 articles a translation of The Protocols of the Elders of Zion, which subsequently formed the basis of a book, The Cause of World Unrest, to which half the paper's staff contributed. Later exposed as a forgery, they were initially accepted, with a leader in The Times blaming Jews for World War I and the Bolshevik regime and calling them the greatest threat to the British Empire.

=== 1900s–1930s: "Civil" Antisemitism ===
During the first decades of the twentieth century, antisemitic discourse in Britain shifted to the mode of what scholars refer to as "civil antisemitism." "'Civil antisemitism' refers to the social and political pressures of the public sphere in which overt bigotry is seen as objectionable." British concerns with civility led to the development of techniques for disguising antisemitic rhetoric. Civil antisemitism because a recognized style of speech and mode of discourse, understood by listeners to have both overt and subtextual meaning. Antisemitic discourse was masked by rhetorical strategies. Antisemitic hatred was expressed through "polite" conversation; British sensibilities disdained more vulgar expressions of antisemitic attitudes but not the attitudes themselves. Parliamentary debates regarding the Aliens Acts of 1904 and 1905, for instance, displayed antisemitic rhetoric under the guise of concerns regarding immigration. The image of the "immigrant alien" stood in for that of "the Jew."

The practice of "civil antisemitism" incorporated antisemitic attitudes into mainstream discourse, masked by euphemisms and rhetorical strategies. This form of antisemitism is exemplified by British modernist writers, such as Virginia Woolf. "The Jew" became a figure used by modernist writers as a stylistic tool and technique. Woolf and her peers experimented with their writing through the lens of civil antisemitism. The shift to more subtle antisemitic expression thus impacted modernist British literature. Civil antisemitism was exemplified within parliamentary debates, fascist fiction and propaganda, modernist literature, and ethnographies. Notions of civility shaped British antisemitism in the first part of the twentieth-century. While "civil" manifestations of antisemitism appeared to display less overt hostility, they operated as hate rhetoric, albeit hate rhetoric that was submerged under "polite" conversation. Prejudices against Jews were simply "hidden." Civil behavior was considered key to British identity; concerns about Jewish immigration and assimilation thus intersected with notions of civility and Britishness.

=== 1930s ===
Popular sentiment against immigration was used by the Imperial Fascist League and the British Union of Fascists to incite hatred against Jews in the 1930s. However, a planned fascist march through the east end of London, with its large Jewish population, had to be abandoned due to the Battle of Cable Street in 1936, where police trying to ensure the march could proceed failed to clear barricades erected and defended by unionised dock workers, socialists, anarchists, communists, Jews and other anti-fascists. Other antisemitic organisations in the 1930s included the Militant Christian Patriots and the Right Club. The Évian Conference in 1938, attended by 32 countries, failed to reach agreement on accepting Jewish refugees from Nazi Germany. While Britain eventually accepted 70,000 up to the outbreak of World War II, in addition to the 10,000 children on the Kindertransport, there were, according to British Jewish associations, more than 500,000 case files of Jews who were not admitted. Louise London, author of Whitehall and the Jews, 1933–1948, stated that "The (British immigration) process...was designed to keep out large numbers of European Jews – perhaps 10 times as many as it let in."

It was difficult for the refugees to find work, regardless of their education, except as domestics. This also meant that Jewish refugees who were physicians could not practise medicine, even though there was a shortage of health care providers. Some of the concern was economic. During a period of high unemployment, the British were concerned about losing job opportunities due to the influx of refugees. German Jewish refugees were discouraged from speaking German and encouraged to assimilate into the culture, which was often accomplished at the expense of their personal history and identity. A law was enacted in the 1930s to ensure that no more than 5% of the total students in a school were Jewish, limiting the rate at which Jewish children could be admitted to state schools. The press, which was generally not supportive of refugees, incorrectly reported that there were more Jews in Britain than had been in Germany in the summer of 1938. Kushner and Katharine Knox state in their book Refugees in an Age of Genocide, "Of all the groups in the 20th century, refugees from Nazism are now widely and popularly perceived as 'genuine', but at the time German, Austrian and Czechoslovak Jews were treated with ambivalence and outright hostility as well as sympathy."

=== World War II and its aftermath ===
When war was declared, Britain no longer allowed immigration from Nazi-controlled countries. The Bermuda Conference of the Allies held in April 1943 held to consider the issue of European Jews, whether liberated or under Nazi rule, by which time it was known that the Nazi regime intended to exterminate them where it could, did not result in agreement on practical steps, with the overriding focus remaining on winning the war. Nevertheless, 10,000 Jews managed to find their way into Britain during the war. Britain did not allow Jews to immigrate to Palestine, though some did so illegally.

During the war, Ministry of Information intelligence reports found examples of prejudice against Jews, including refugees from Nazi-occupied Europe, in almost all parts of the country, with Jews being a "scapegoat as an outlet for emotional disturbances". Immediately following the war, a large number of refugees entered the UK, but few were Jewish Holocaust survivors as immigration policy barred Jews because it did not consider them easily assimilable. A cabinet minister argued in 1945 that "the admission of a further batch of refugees, many of whom would be Jews, might provoke strong reactions from certain sections of public opinion. There was a real risk of a wave of anti-semitic feeling in this country". Nevertheless, in the aftermath of the Holocaust, undisguised, racial hatred of Jews became unacceptable in British society.

=== Post-War ===
Anti-Jewish sentiments became widespread around 1947 in response to fighting between the British Army and Zionist groups in the British Mandate for Palestine. In August 1947, after the hanging of two abducted British sergeants by the Irgun, there was widespread anti-Jewish rioting across the United Kingdom. Antisemitic activity from fascist groups, Jeffrey Hamm's British League of Ex-Servicemen and, later, Oswald Mosley's new fascist party, the Union Movement, included antisemitic speeches in public places, and from the rank-and-file fascists, attacks on Jews and Jewish property. This resulted in the formation of the 43 Group, led by Jewish ex-servicemen, which, from 1945 to 1950, broke up far right meetings, infiltrated fascist groups, and attacked the fascists in street fighting. In the 1960s, groups such as the British National Party, founded in 1960, and the National Socialist Movement, founded in 1962, maintained a far right tradition.

After lobbying by the Board of Deputies of British Jews, Jews, along with other groups, received formal legal protection from the Race Relations Act 1965, which outlawed discrimination on the "grounds of colour, race, or ethnic or national origins" in public places in Great Britain, and from successor legislation. However, far right groups, such as the National Front, founded in 1967, and a new British National Party, founded in 1982, continued to express antisemitic views.

== 21st century ==
=== Analysis ===
==== Sources ====
Antisemitic attitudes in the UK are higher amongst those on the far-right, and religious Muslims. Contemporary antisemitism is also prevalent on the political left.

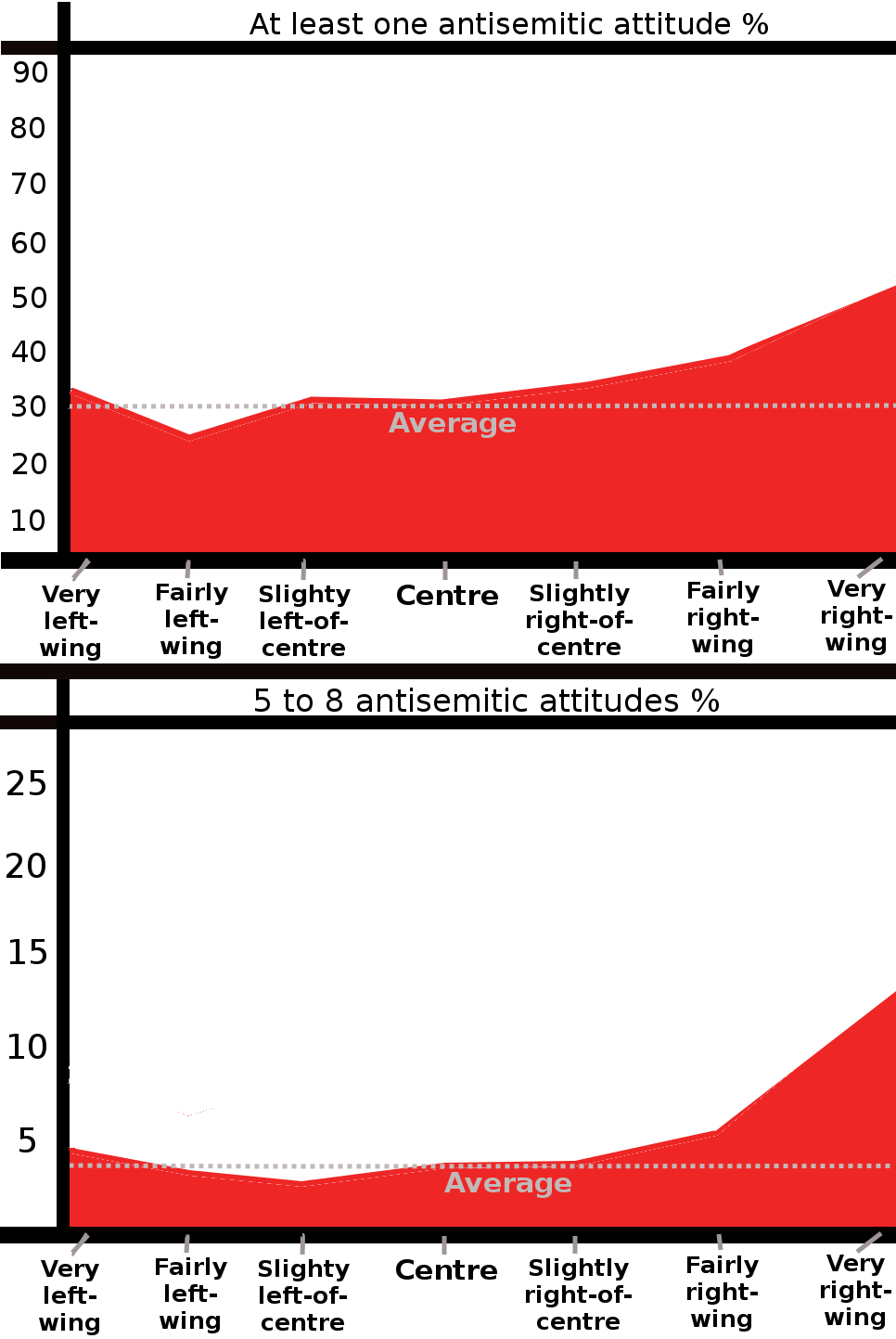
Antisemitic attitudes among the UK population by political position according to the 2017 JPR survey.

Holocaust denial and antisemitic conspiracy theories remain core elements of far-right ideology. A study into contemporary antisemitism in Britain by the Institute for Jewish Policy Research in September 2017 found that "The most antisemitic group on the political spectrum consists of those who identify as very right-wing: the presence of antisemitic attitudes in this group is 2 to 4 times higher compared to the general population." The study stated that in "surveys of attitudes towards ethnic and religious minorities... The most consistently found pattern across different surveys is heightened animosity towards Jews on the political right..." The Community Security Trust in 2018 found that far-right motivation or beliefs accounted for nearly one third of the 16% of incidents reported to them as antisemitic and with an identifiable political or ideological motivation. According to a European Union Fundamental Rights Agency survey in 2018, victims in the UK, in instances where they ascribed a political viewpoint, perceived 20% of the perpetrators of the most serious attack or threat they had experienced to be "someone with a right-wing political view". In 2016, research by the World Jewish Congress found that 90% of antisemitic posts on social media in the UK were made by white males under the age of 40 with affiliations to extreme right-wing groups.

Some British Muslims, particularly Islamists, significantly contribute to antisemitism. The underlying roots are complex and include historical attitudes, domestic and political tensions, the Israeli–Palestinian conflict, and globalisation of the Middle East conflict. A 2016 survey by the Institute for Jewish Policy Research found that the prevalence of antisemitic views among Muslims was two to four times higher than the rest of the population and that there was a positive correlation between Muslim religiosity and antisemitism. According to the Community Security Trust, in 2018 in incidents where a physical description of the perpetrator was provided, 9% were described as being of Arab or North African appearance and a further 13% of south Asian appearance. Very few incidents that year included Islamist expressions. According to a European Union Fundamental Rights Agency survey in 2018, victims in the UK, in instances where they ascribed a political viewpoint, perceived 38% of the perpetrators of the most serious attack or threat they had experienced to be "someone with a Muslim extremist view".

Contemporary antisemitism also manifests on the political left. Anti-Zionism, principally, though not exclusively, from the left as well as from Muslims, has been associated with antisemitic attitudes and incidents. The Community Security Trust in 2018 found that references to Israel accounted for nearly two-thirds of the 16% of antisemitic incidents with an identifiable political or ideological motivation. A study by the Institute for Jewish Policy Research in September 2017 found that "Levels of antisemitism among those on the left-wing of the political spectrum, including the far-left, are indistinguishable from those found in the general population. Yet, all parts of those on the left of the political spectrum exhibit higher levels of anti Israelism than average." The report found that "...anti-Israel attitudes are not, as a general rule, antisemitic; but the stronger a person's anti-Israel views, the more likely they are to hold antisemitic attitudes. A majority of those who hold anti-Israel attitudes do not espouse any antisemitic attitudes, but a significant minority of those who hold anti-Israel attitudes hold them alongside antisemitic attitudes. Therefore, antisemitism and anti-Israel attitudes exist both separately and together." The study stated that in "surveys of attitudes towards ethnic and religious minorities...The political left, captured by voting intention or actual voting for Labour, appears in these surveys as a more Jewish-friendly, or neutral, segment of the population." According to a European Union Fundamental Rights Agency survey in 2018, victims in the UK in instances where they ascribed a political viewpoint, perceived 43% of the perpetrators of the most serious attack or threat they had experienced to be "someone with a left-wing view".

In 2026, a London School of Economics study examined declining trust among British Jews towards major UK institutions, such as the police, education system, universities, media and legal system. Participants in six focus groups of adult, British Jews, reported concerns regarding institutional responses to antisemitism and a sense of being unsupported by public organs.

==== Incidents ====
In 2022, 17% of religious hate crimes were against Jews, who account for 0.5% of the British population. As well as hate crimes reported to the police, the Community Security Trust (CST) monitors incidents reported by members of the public. The majority of reports of antisemitic incidents are from areas where most Jews live: Metropolitan London, Greater Manchester and Hertfordshire. Over 2014–18, around one fifth of the reported incidents occurred on social media. The level typically rises following events related to Israel or the wider Middle East.

The CST reported a large rise in incidents after the 2014 Israel-Gaza conflict, 2021 Israel-Palestine crisis, and the ongoing Gaza war (2023–ongoing). For example, in 2021 a convoy of cars with Palestinian flags driving through East Finchley, an area of London with a sizeable Jewish community, and the driver of one of the cars being recorded yelling "fuck their [Jews] mothers, rape their daughters". The sharp rise in the number of reported incidents from 2016 onwards followed increased media coverage of antisemitism and may be an increase in actual incidents, or in reporting, or both. Around a quarter of reported incidents in 2018 took place on social media. The largest increases are in threats and abusive behaviour. The Trust believes that the total number of incidents is significantly higher than that reported.

Annual Incidents Figures by Category 1997–2018
Category	1997	1998	1999	2000	2001	2002	2003	2004	2005	2006	2007	2008	2009	2010	2011	2012	2013	2014	2015	2016	2017	2018
Extreme violence	4	0	0	2	1	5	0	4	2	4	1	1	3	0	2	2	0	1	4	0	0	1
Assault	19	17	33	51	40	42	54	79	80	108	116	87	121	114	93	67	69	80	83	109	149	122
Damage & desecration	58	31	25	73	90	55	72	53	48	70	65	76	89	83	64	53	49	81	65	81	93	78
Threats	19	16	31	39	37	18	22	93	25	27	24	28	45	32	30	39	38	91	79	107	98	109
Abusive behaviour	86	136	127	196	122	216	211	272	273	365	336	317	609	391	412	467	374	899	717	1059	1065	1300
Literature	33	36	54	44	20	14	16	31	27	20	19	37	62	25	7	12	5	30	12	19	15	42
Total	219	236	270	405	310	350	375	532	455	594	561	546	931	646	609	650	535	1182	960	1375	1420	1652

Annual Incidents Figures 2020-2024
2020	2021	2022	2023	2024
1,684	2,261	1,662	4,296	3,582

Total incidents by year:

In 2017–18 the police in England and Wales (excluding Lancashire) recorded 1191 antisemitic hate crimes, which excludes some behaviours recorded by the CST. Taking the Metropolitan Police data alone, the number rose by 15% in the following year, from 519 to 597. Comparisons with the Crime Survey for England and Wales suggest that less than half of hate crime is reported to the police. A 2018 survey by the European Union Agency for Fundamental Rights found that about a quarter of Jews in the UK had felt offended or threatened over the last year, increasing to one third over the last five years. In the same survey, 24% of British Jews had witnessed other Jews being verbally insulted or harassed and/or physically attacked in the past 12 months, of whom 18% were family members. Only about one fifth of incidents were reported.

Between the 2023 Gaza War's outbreak and March 2024, the police in England and Wales recorded 140,561 hate crimes, 70% of which were racially motivated, while the spike in hate crimes was caused by a bump in antisemitic offences. In England and Wale alone, 3,282 antisemitic offences have been recorded, more than doubled vis-à-vis the previous year, while allegedly anti-Muslim offences rose by 13%.

The CST recorded 4,103 antisemitic incidents in 2023 compared to 1,510 in 2022. The CST tallied 272 antisemitic incidents during the 2023–2024 school year, over five times the number in the previous year. In one example, the University of Leeds Jewish chaplain received threats to rape and kill his wife and murder his children. The surge mirrored the previous peak which was during the 2021 Israel-Hamas conflict. According to the CST, nearly 2,000 antisemitic incidents were recorded in the first half of 2024, marking the highest number ever documented in a six-month period.

CST incident figures remained elevated in the second half of 2024, with 3,528 incidents reported that year. In October 2024, a Swastika and antisemitic slogans were graffitied at a golf club in a Jewish area of London. London police are investigating the incident and a hate crime.

In the first half of 2025, according to a report by CST, 1,521 antisemitic incidents were recorded across the United Kingdom, amounting to more than 200 cases per month.

On 2 October 2025, a terrorist attack took place outside the Heaton Park Hebrew Congregation in Manchester during Yom Kippur. The attacker, Jihad al-Shamie, a 35-year-old Syrian—born British citizen, rammed a car into pedestrians and stabbed worshippers before being shot dead by police. Two people were killed (one by police firing on the attacker) and three were seriously injured.

As of October 2025, a memorial to the victims of the October 7 attacks in Brighton has been vandalized over fifty times and destroyed several times since its creation.

In 2025, the British Jewish communal security charity Community Security Trust (CST) recorded 3,700 antisemitic incidents across the United Kingdom, marking the second-highest annual total ever documented since systematic tracking began. The figure represented a 4% increase from the 3,556 incidents reported in 2024 and was surpassed only by the 2023 total. According to CST and subsequent media reporting, a significant spike occurred following a fatal terrorist attack on a synagogue in Manchester on Yom Kippur in October, which led to the highest daily total of incidents recorded that year. The incidents included assaults, vandalism, threats and online abuse, with more than half referencing international events, particularly developments related to the Israel–Palestine conflict.

In March 2026, Norfolk Police initiated a hate-crime investigation following an under-15 football match between Jewish Free School and Thorpe St Andrew School in Norwich during the quarterfinal round of a national tournament, in which antisemitic slurs such as "Dirty Jews" and "Go back to the gas chambers" were shouted from the stands at players by a crowd that consisted primarily of supporters of the Norwich school.

In March and April 2026, a series of attacks targeted London's Jewish community. The attacks have involved arson, explosive devices and chemicals, and targeted Jewish schools, synagogues and charities. Responsibility for the attacks was claimed by Harakat Ashab al-Yamin al-Islamia, which is believed to be a front group for Iran's Islamic Revolutionary Guard Corps, who had outsourced the acts to local criminals and used the group to create plausible deniability.

On 23 March 2026, London Police initiated a hate-crime investigation following an arson attack on four Hatzola emergency vehicles in Golders Green. Hatzola consists of volunteers providing emergency services in London. PM Starmer said: "This is a deeply shocking antisemitic arson attack. My thoughts are with the Jewish community who are waking up this morning to this horrific news... antisemitism has no place in our society. Anyone with any information must come forward to the police." Ephraim Mirvis, Chief Rabbi of the United Hebrew Congregations of the Commonwealth, called the attack a "particularly sickening assault" on an organization "whose sole mission is to protect life, Jewish and non-Jewish alike".

On 15 April 2026, two individuals threw a brick and bottles suspected to contain petrol towards the Finchley Reform Synagogue in north London in an attempted arson. As the devices did not blow up, no injuries or damage occurred. Police stated that the incident was being treated as an antisemitic hate crime. Following the incident, two suspects, a 46-year-old man and a 47-year-old woman, were arrested on suspicion of arson with intent to endanger life.

Antisemitic incidents in Britain increased by 21% in the first half of 2026 over the same time period in 2025, according to figures released in August 2026 by the Community Security Trust, British Jewry’s watchdog group. Nearly 2,000 incidents were reported during the time period — <the second most ever recorded for the first six months of a year, following only the first half of 2024. The Community Security Trust has tracked antisemitic incidents since 1984.

On 28 February 2026, Michael Brown, a 45 year old from Newhaven, East Sussex, wrote a Facebook post suggesting to "target local synagogues and Jewish businesses" with eggs, fruit and stink bombs. Signing the post with "does anyone has good recipe for roasted Synagogue?". He pleaded guilty to sending an offensive, indecent, obscene or menacing message over a public communications network and was sentenced, in September of the same year, at Westminster Magistrates' Court to eight weeks in prison, suspended for one year. According to the judge, the offence was aggravated by racial hostility.

On 29 April 2026, two Jewish men were stabbed in the street in the Golders Green area of North London, England. The suspect had earlier tried to murder his own friend, a Muslim man, in Southwark. The suspect was arrested by police and charged with attempted murder. The attacks on the two Jewish men were initially declared terrorist incidents by the Metropolitan Police. The Met later said it was treating the attacks as hate crimes rather than terrorist attacks. In May 2026, the United States Justice Department charged Iraqi national Mohammad Baqer Saad Dawood al-Saadi for his involvement in this and other incidents tied to his alleged role as an operative for the Iran-backed Iraqi paramilitary group Kata'ib Hezbollah and Iran’s Islamic Revolutionary Guard Corps (IRGC).

On 10 May 2026, Syeda Khatun, a 39 year old from Hackney, directed antisemitic abuse at children who were waiting outside their Jewish secondary school in Stamford Hill. After she was asked by the father of one of the children why she was targeting them, Khatun assaulted him whilst shouting further antisemitic slurs. She was convicted of several racially aggravated offences and sentenced on 27 August of the same year to 12 months' imprisonment, suspended for two years. According to Ragvesh Singh, Senior Crown Prosecutor in CPS London North, the sentence was increased to reflect the antisemitic motivation of the offences, as requested by the prosecution.

In August 2026, an Israeli television crew filming a documentary about antisemitism in Europe was attacked while interviewing people on the street in Belfast, Northern Ireland. Once the attacker, a 30 year old local man who was later arrested and charged, realised that its an Israeli crew, he confronted them, shouted 'fuck Israel' at them, attempted to take their camera and disrupt the recording, and threw a beer glass at a cameraman, injuring him in the head. The ADL called it "global antisemitism in action", while DUP leader Gavin Robinson said that if the attack was motivated by antisemitism it should be recognized and condemned.

==== Attitudes ====
Trends in Antisemitic Attitudes in United Kingdom.

2004 2005 2007 2009 2012

1. Jews are more loyal to Israel than to this country
2. Jews have too much power in the business world
3. Jews have too much power in international financial markets
4. Jews still talk too much about the Holocaust

Research published in June 2015 by the Pew Research Center showed that of, six countries participating, the population of the UK had almost the most favourable views of Jews. While 78% of these six European countries have a favourable opinion of Jewish people and 13% did not, 83% of the UK population hold positive views, and only 7% hold unfavourable opinions.

In 2017 the Institute for Jewish Policy Research conducted what it called "the largest and most detailed survey of attitudes towards Jews and Israel ever conducted in Great Britain." The survey found that the levels of antisemitism in Great Britain were among the lowest in the world, with 2.4% expressing multiple antisemitic attitudes, and about 70% having a favourable opinion of Jews. However, only 17% had a favourable opinion of Israel, with 33% holding an unfavourable view. A poll published in 2024 found that over half of young British people aged 18–24 believed that Israel is treating Palestinians the way Nazis treated Jews. 46% of British adults believe at least one statement viewed as antisemitic.

===== Age differences =====
Recent survey findings have suggested that certain attitudes which have been defined as antisemitic may be more common among younger generations in Britain than older ones. For instance, a poll conducted by the Campaign Against Antisemitism in 2023 indicated that, compared to the general population (one in twenty), double the proportion of 18–24 year olds in Britain (almost one in ten) do not believe that Jewish people are just as loyal to Britain as other British people. A year prior, in 2022, a survey conducted by Hope Not Hate reportedly indicated that, while only 12% of Brits aged 75+ agreed Jews have an 'unhealthy control over the world banking system', 34% of 18–24 year olds agreed this was 'probably' or 'definitely' true.

===== Regional attitudes =====
In his 2026 book Jews in the Welsh Imagination: Medieval Times to the Present, Nathan Abrams of Bangor University reported on attitudes towards Jews in Wales, a region that has had few Jewish residents for more than a thousand years and whose most recent numbers in census data accounted for less than one-tenth of one percent of the Welsh population. Abrams noted that "the absence of Jews hasn't meant the absence of antisemitism".

==== Discourse ====
Where a motivation was evident, incidents reported to the Community Security Trust split roughly between one third which are far-right and two-thirds which are anti-Israel. In other cases, the motivation is unclear because the perpetrator either did not communicate a clear rationale or used a combination of some or all of classic antisemitic canards, Nazi references and anti-Israel expressions. Some expressions criticising Israel are regarded by many as antisemitic. For some, criticism of Israel and anti-Zionism is itself a form of antisemitism.

=== Inquiries ===
In 2006, a group of British Members of Parliament held an inquiry into antisemitism at the time of the Second Intifada. Its report stated that "until recently, the prevailing opinion both within the Jewish community and beyond [had been] that antisemitism had receded to the point that it existed only on the margins of society." It found a reversal of this progress since 2000. The inquiry was reconstituted following a surge in antisemitic incidents in Britain during the summer of 2014, at the time of the 2014 Israel-Gaza conflict and published its report in 2015, making recommendations for reducing antisemitism.

In 2016, the Home Affairs Select Committee held an inquiry into antisemitism in the UK. The inquiry called party leaders and others to give evidence. Its report was critical of the Conservative Party, the Labour Party, the Chakrabarti Inquiry, the Liberal Democrats, the National Union of Students (particularly its then president Malia Bouattia), Twitter and police forces for variously exacerbating or failing to address antisemitism. The report made a series of recommendations, including the formal adoption by the UK government, with additional caveats (for example, on free speech), of the International Holocaust Remembrance Alliance (IHRA)'s Working Definition of Antisemitism.

=== Political parties ===
In 2015, 2016 and 2017, the Campaign Against Antisemitism (CAA) commissioned YouGov to survey British attitudes towards Jews. The 2017 survey found that 30% of supporters of the Liberal Democrats endorsed at least one "antisemitic attitude", as defined by the CAA, compared with 32% of Labour supporters, 39% of UK Independence Party (UKIP) supporters and 40% of Conservative Party supporters. The 2016 Select Committee enquiry found that, although the threat that the far right posed to Jews had fallen, "Holocaust denial and Jewish conspiracy theories remain core elements of far-right ideology" and the British National Party (BNP) continues to stir up trouble and damages societal cohesion. The report also provided evidence of antisemitism in the Conservative Party, including an alleged "toxic environment" in the UCL Conservative Society.

Complaints of antisemitism in the Labour Party have been made, especially in the period after its members elected Jeremy Corbyn as leader in 2015. In 2016 Labour commissioned the Chakrabarti Inquiry, which found "no evidence" of systemic antisemitism in Labour, though there was an "occasionally toxic atmosphere". The Select Committee in 2016 concluded that "...there exists no reliable, empirical evidence to support the notion that there is a higher prevalence of antisemitic attitudes within the Labour Party than any other political party". It also found that Jeremy Corbyn had shown a "lack of consistent leadership", which "has created what some have referred to as a 'safe space' for those with vile attitudes towards Jewish people" and that "The failure of the Labour Party to deal consistently and effectively with anti-Semitic incidents in recent years risks lending force to allegations that elements of the Labour movement are institutionally anti-Semitic." The party introduced new rules to tackle antisemitism in 2017.

There have also been complaints of antisemitism in the Conservative and Liberal Democrat parties. For example, since the start in July 2019 of Boris Johnson's leadership of the Conservative party, senior Conservative politicians have been accused of antisemitism – including Priti Patel, Crispin Blunt, Michael Gove, James Cleverly, and Johnson's advisor Dominic Cummings, as have Liberal Democrat parliamentary candidates. In an interview with the Sunday Times in January 2020, former House of Commons speaker John Bercow said that, while he had never faced antisemitic abuse from Labour Party members, "I did experience antisemitism from members of the Conservative Party."

In April 2024, Mick Greenhough, who was set to stand as a parliamentary candidate for Reform UK in the constituency of Orpington, was dismissed by the party when it emerged that he had tweeted in 2019, "Most Jews are reasonable people. Their problem is the Ashkenazi Jews who have caused the world massive misery." Greenhough had also alleged that Justin Welby, the Archbishop of Canterbury, was "a Jew and closer to Cultural Marxism than Christianity. Is his aim to destroy Christianity?". A spokesman for Reform said that, while the party defended its "candidates' right to freedom of speech", they "act fast when we find that individuals' statements' fall beneath our standards." In August 2024, Jewish members of the Labour Party sent a letter to Prime Minister Keir Starmer, accusing him and his party of actions worsening antisemitism.

=== Responses ===
==== Government ====
The Home Office has provided 'The Jewish Community Protective Security Grant' for the security of synagogues, schools and other Jewish centres, with the Community Security Trust as the Grant Recipient. It was introduced in 2015 and Home Secretary, Sajid Javid pledged to increase funding, bringing the total amount allocated from 2015 to 2019 to £65.2 million.

The Holocaust is the only compulsory subject in the national history curriculum in secondary schools. The Department for Education provides significant funding to the Holocaust Educational Trust, including programmes for schools and universities. The Government also funds the Holocaust Memorial Day Trust. The Heritage Lottery Fund in 2018 and 2019 provided significant funding for conservation and a religious, educational and cultural centre for Bevis Marks Synagogue, to open Willesden Jewish Cemetery as a place of heritage for the public, to open a Holocaust Education and Learning Centre in Huddersfield and to refresh and expand the Beth Shalom Holocaust Centre in Nottinghamshire. In August 2019, the Imperial War Museum announced plans to spend over £30m on a new set of galleries over two floors at its London site covering the Holocaust and its importance in World War II. The galleries are set to open in 2021 and will replace the existing permanent Holocaust exhibition. The government is contributing £75m to the planned UK Holocaust Memorial.

The government is funding the anti-prejudice charities, the Anne Frank Trust and Kick it Out and has provided significant funding via the Office for Students to tackle religious-based hate crime in higher education. In September 2019, the government announced a grant of £100,000 to the Antisemitism Policy Trust to produce videos to combat antisemitism online. In September 2019, Robert Jenrick, the newly appointed Secretary of State for Housing, Communities and Local Government said "I will use my position as Secretary of State to write to all universities and local authorities to insist that they adopt the IHRA definition at the earliest opportunity...and use it when considering matters such as disciplinary procedures. Failure to act in this regard is unacceptable."

According to a survey conducted by the Campaign Against Antisemitism in June 2024, 84% of British Jews believe that authorities are not doing enough to address antisemitic incidents and to penalize those responsible. In September 2024, UK Prime Minister Keir Starmer announced a mandatory Holocaust education program. In October 2024, the UK Department for Education announced it was allocating £7 million to fighting antisemitism in schools and universities.

In March 2026, the UK government made public that it plans to conduct an independent review into antisemitism in England's schools and colleges. According to an official statement, the review will examine how educational institutions prevent and respond to antisemitic incidents, taking into account testimonies of Jewish pupils and staff.

£250m of additional government funding, spread over three years, was announced by the Home Office in July 2026.

==== Migration ====
According to surveys conducted by the Institute for Jewish Policy Research, the proportion of British Jews who had contemplated emigration due to antisemitism at some point in the previous five years was 18% in 2012, and 29% five years later in 2017. In the latter survey, three-quarters of those who had contemplated leaving said that they were considering moving to Israel. However, emigration to Israel fell by 11% between the two five-year periods and was much lower than the contemplated level, at 2,899 people in total during 2008–2012 and 2,579 in total during 2013–2017, or about 1% of the community during each five-year period. In December 2023, a poll conducted by the Campaign Against Antisemitism showed that nearly half of British Jews had considered leaving the UK in response to increased antisemitism following the October 7 Hamas-led attack on Israel. A survey conducted by the Campaign Against Antisemitism in June 2024 found that only a third of British Jews believed they had a long-term future in the country, and just 48% felt welcome in the UK.

== See also ==
- Racism in the United Kingdom

== Bibliography ==
- Billig, Michael (1978). Fascists: A Social Psychological View of the National Front. London: Academic Press. ISBN 978-0150040040.
- Cardaun, Sarah K. (2015). Countering Contemporary Antisemitism in Britain. BRILL. p. 37. ISBN 978-9004300880.
- Goodwin, Matthew (2011). New British Fascism: Rise of the British National Party. Routledge. ISBN 978-0415465014.
- Hirshfield, Claire. "The British Left and the" Jewish Conspiracy": A Case Study of Modern Antisemitism." Jewish Social Studies 43.2 (1981): 95–112. nline
- Judd, Denis; Surridge, Keith (2013). The Boer War: A History. I.B.Tauris. ISBN 978-0-857-73316-0.
- Lavezzo, Kathy (2016). The Accommodated Jew: English Antisemitism from Bede to Milton. Cornell University Press. p. 392. ISBN 978-1-5017-0315-7.
- Mundill, Robin R. (2010), The King's Jews, London: Continuum, ISBN 978-1847251862, LCCN 2010282921, OCLC 466343661, OL 24816680M
- Rosenberg, David (2011). Battle for the East End. Five Leaves Publications. ISBN 978-1-907869-18-1.
- Stacey, Robert C. (2003). "The English Jews Under Henry III: Historical, Literary and Archaeological Perspectives". In Skinner, Patricia (ed.). Jews in Medieval Britain. Woodbridge, UK: Boydell Press. pp. 41–54. ISBN 978-1-84383-733-6.
- Staetsky, L. Daniel (12 September 2017). Antisemitism in contemporary Great Britain: A study of attitudes towards Jews and Israel (PDF). Institute for Jewish Policy Research. pp. 1–82.
- Toczek, Nick (2016). Haters, Baiters and Would-be Dictators: Anti-Semitism and the UK Far Right (Abingdon: Routledge).
- Weaver, Matthew; Elgot, Jessica (26 September 2017). "Labour fringe speaker's Holocaust remarks spark new antisemitism row". The Guardian.
- Wheatcroft, Geoffrey (28 June 2018). "Bad Company". New York Review of Books.
- Wistrich, Robert S. (2012). "Great Britain: A Suitable case for treatment?". From Ambivalence to Betrayal: The Left, the Jews, and Israel. University of Nebraska Press/Vidal Sassoon International Center for the Study of Antisemitism. ISBN 978-0-803-24083-4.
