= Antisemitism during the 2026 Iran war =

During the 2026 Iran war, which began on 28 February 2026, when the United States and Israel engaged in a war with Iran and its regional allies, antisemitic incidents occurred worldwide. Some advocacy groups, including the pro-Israel Combat Antisemitism Movement and Cyberwell, have suggested that the incidents form part of a broader trend of increased antisemitism. Others, including the Jewish Council of Australia, argue that this analysis improperly conflates criticism of Israel with antisemitism. Many of the incidents, including a number of attacks in London in March-April 2026, were claimed by Harakat Ashab al-Yamin al-Islamia, which some analysts believe to be a front group for Iran's Islamic Revolutionary Guard Corps, who those analysts believe had outsourced the acts to local criminals, thereby creating plausible deniability as a form of hybrid warfare.

Commonly cited incidents have included attacks against synagogues and other Jewish institutions in Belgium, the Netherlands, the United Kingdom, Canada, and the United States. Also frequently included in discussions of the supposed trend is the 2026 stabbing of three men (2 Jewish, 1 Muslim) in London. Some observers have noted an increase in the spread of online antisemitism.

== See also ==
- Timeline of antisemitism in the 21st century
- Antisemitism during the Gaza war
- IHRA definition
