= 2026 London antisemitic attacks =

Series of antisemitic attacks in London, England

- Location: London, England
- Date: 23 March 2026 – present
- Target: Jewish community in London
- Attack type: Arson; mass stabbing
- Injuries: 4
- Perpetrator: Harakat Ashab al-Yamin al-Islamia (claimed)
- Accused: 80

Beginning in March 2026, the Jewish community in London, United Kingdom, became the target of a wave of antisemitic attacks, primarily involving arson directed at synagogues, community charities, and residential buildings. The campaign's most prominent incidents include the Hatzola ambulance arson and the Golders Green stabbings.

Responsibility for many of the incidents was claimed online by Harakat Ashab al-Yamin al-Islamia (HAYI), identified by investigators as a front group for Iran's Islamic Revolutionary Guard Corps (IRGC). According to authorities, the IRGC outsourced the operations to local criminals to maintain plausible deniability. Kata'ib Hezbollah, an Iran-backed Iraqi paramilitary group, was implicated when its commander, Mohammad Baqer Saad Dawood al-Saadi, was charged by U.S. prosecutors for directing the network.

The attacks prompted a major counter-terrorism investigation, leading to over 80 arrests and increased security for the Jewish community in northwest London. The wave of attacks also saw a significant response from political leaders and community figures. Counter-terrorism investigators also examined related incidents involving Israeli and Iranian-opposition interests.

== Background ==
The Iranian state has a longstanding record of sponsoring terrorism and hybrid warfare in the United Kingdom. Between 2022 and 2024, MI5 disrupted 20 Iran-linked plots. In May 2025, Counter Terrorism Policing arrested eight men across England on suspicion of preparing a terrorist act, which was suspected to target synagogues and other Jewish community sites, according to The Daily Telegraph. In March 2026, two men – dual Iranian‑British national Nematollah Shahsavani, 40, and Iranian national Alireza Farasati, 22 – were charged under section three of the National Security Act 2023 for engaging in conduct likely to assist a foreign intelligence service, following surveillance of Jewish individuals and locations.

During the 2026 Iran war, which began on 28 February 2026, when the United States and Israel engaged in a war with Iran and its regional allies, antisemitic incidents increased worldwide.

== Incidents ==
=== March 2026 ===
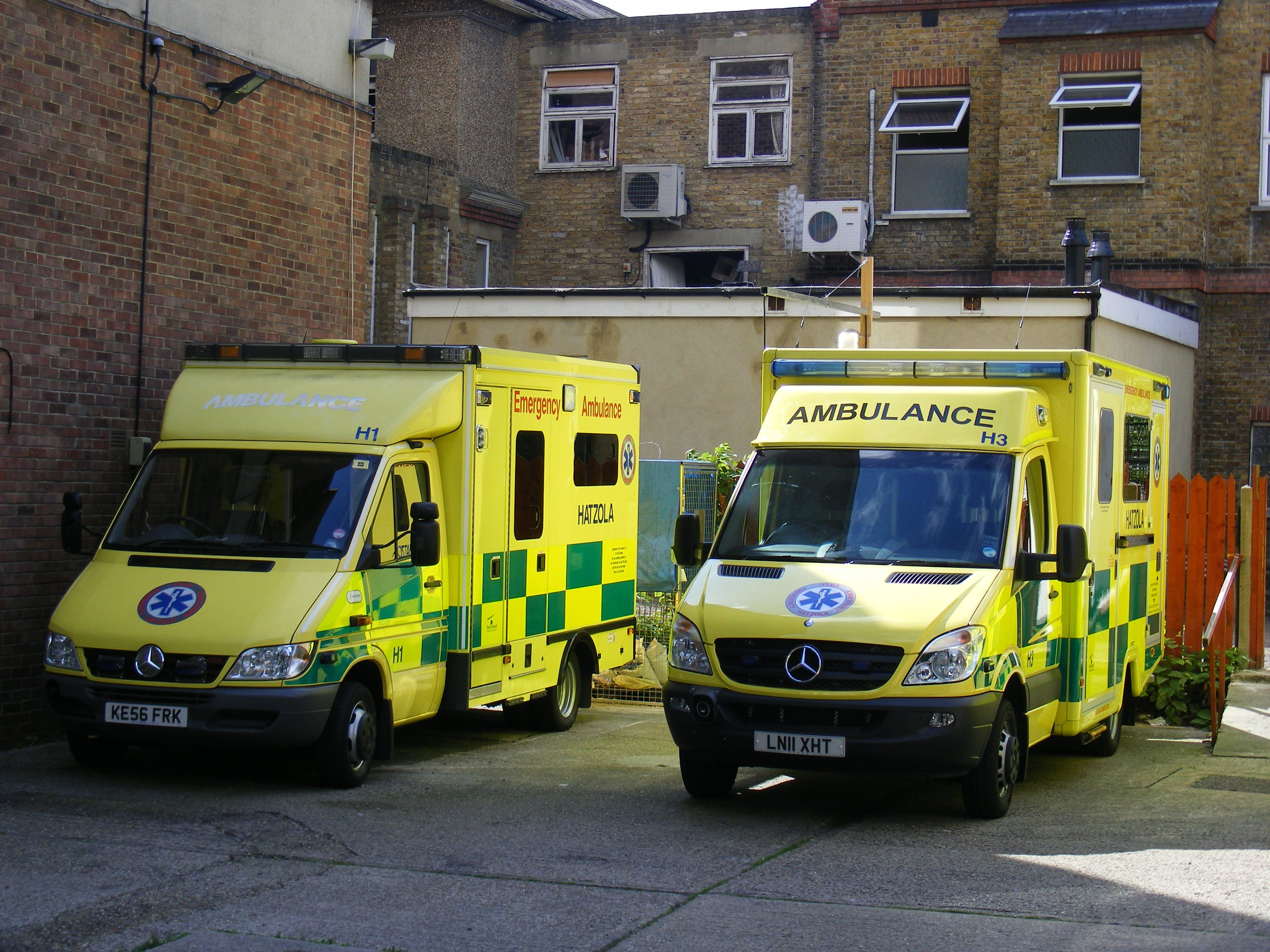
Four Hatzola ambulances were destroyed by arson at Machzike Hadath synagogue (pictured in 2011).

- Hatzola arson attack: On 23 March, four ambulances belonging to Hatzola – a community-funded volunteer ambulance service – were destroyed by arson in the car park of Machzike Hadath synagogue, Golders Green. CCTV footage showed three hooded individuals pouring accelerant on the vehicles before fleeing, leading to explosions of onboard oxygen cylinders. The blasts damaged stained‑glass windows, caused smoke and roof damage to the synagogue, and shattered windows in a nearby block of flats.

=== April 2026 ===
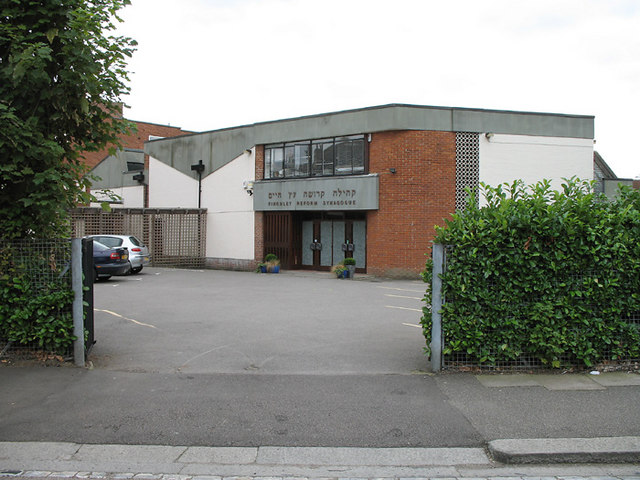
Finchley Reform Synagogue was the target of an attempted firebombing attack.

- Finchley synagogue firebombing: On 15 April, a brick and two petrol-filled bottles were thrown at Finchley Reform Synagogue. Neither bottle ignited, no damage occurred, and no injuries were reported.
- Hendon charity arson attack: Late on 17 April, a man attempted to ignite a bag containing three bottles of fluid at the doorway of a building in Hendon formerly occupied by the charity Jewish Futures. The bottles failed to ignite fully, causing only minor scorch marks. No injuries were reported.
- Kenton synagogue arson attack: On 18 April, a bottle containing an accelerant was thrown through a window of Kenton United Synagogue, damaging the synagogue's medical room.
- Watford shop attack: On 19 April, a Jewish-owned shop in Watford was set on fire and targeted with antisemitic graffiti. Hertfordshire Police described the incident as a "religiously aggravated" and stated that, at that point in time, it was believed to be an isolated incident.
- Finchley residential arson: Early on 19 April, an arson attack was directed at a residential building in Finchley opposite a synagogue.
- Golders Green stabbings: On 29 April, two Jewish men, aged 34 and 76, were stabbed in Golders Green. They were treated at the scene by Hatzola and taken to hospital. Prime Minister Keir Starmer described the attack as "utterly appalling". The 45‑year‑old assailant was detained by Shomrim volunteers before being tasered and arrested by police. According to the Community Security Trust, 71 antisemitic incidents were recorded across the UK in the three days following the stabbings, 16 of which directly referred to the attack.

=== May–June 2026 ===
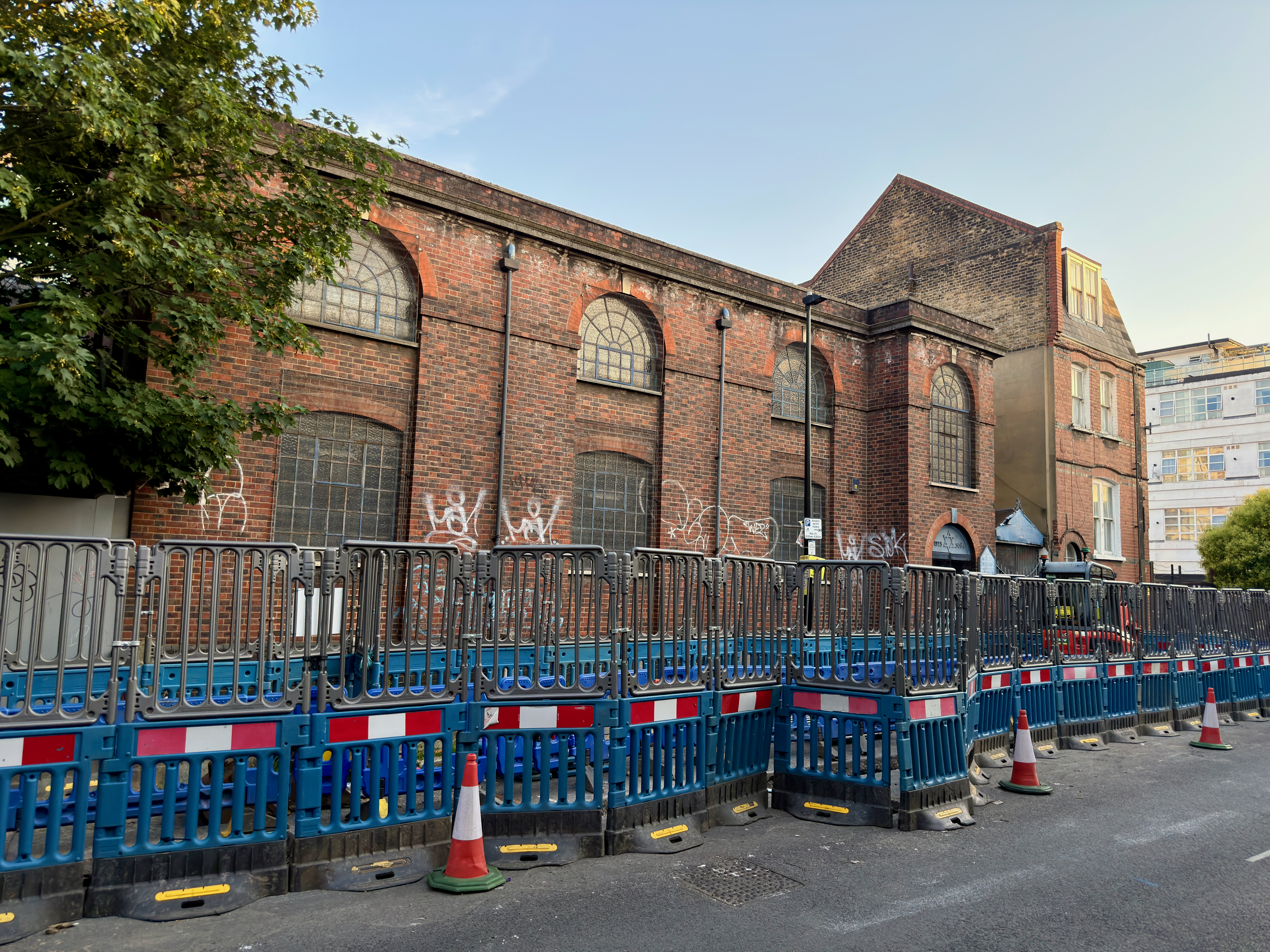
- The East London Central Synagogue building was the target of an arson attack.
  Former East London Central Synagogue arson attack: The building of the former East London Central Synagogue in Tower Hamlets sustained an arson attack by two men on the early morning of 5 May. The synagogue had closed in 2020 and was in the process of being purchased by a mosque. It had been targeted with graffiti saying "free Palestine" and "kill the zionists [sic]" the previous year.
- Attempted Golders Green arson attack: On 2 June, a suspected arson occurred in the communal stairwell of an apartment building on Bridge Lane, Golders Green, where an empty pram was set alight. Residents confronted the suspect, who fled the scene, and extinguished the blaze before emergency services arrived. The Jewish community patrol group Shomrim stated that witnesses saw the suspect deliberately start the fire and noted that the majority of the building's residents are Jewish families.

=== Related incidents and foiled plots ===
- Persian media organisation arson attempt: On 15 April, an ignited container was thrown towards the office of Iran International, a Persian language media organisation in Park Royal, north-west London, with three men subsequently arrested and Harakat Ashab al-Yamin al-Islamia (HAYI) claiming responsibility.
- Israeli embassy chemical threat: On 17 April, HAYI claimed it was planning an attack on the Embassy of Israel using "dangerous substances". No attack took place, and no injuries or damage were reported. Discarded items, including two jars containing a powdered substance, were found in Kensington Gardens near the embassy. The items were later confirmed to contain no harmful substances.
- Foiled arson attack: On 19 and 20 April, seven people were arrested for planning an arson attack on a Jewish community site. The Metropolitan Police said that the specific target or venue within the Jewish community was unknown.
- Memorial wall arson attack: On 28 April, a suspected arson attack occurred at a memorial wall in Golders Green. The wall is situated outside a Jewish synagogue and serves as a tribute to protesters killed by the Iranian government during an anti-government crackdown and victims of the Nova music festival attack in Israel.

== Investigation ==
Responsibility for many of the antisemitic attacks was claimed online by HAYI, a newly formed organization believed to be a front group for Iran's Islamic Revolutionary Guard Corps (IRGC), which outsources attacks to local criminals and uses the group's branding to create plausible deniability. On 13 July, the UK government proscribed and imposed financial sanctions on HAYI, which Foreign Secretary Yvette Cooper said was part of the government's "commitment to protect the Jewish community" and "stamp out vile antisemitism from our streets".

National Counter Terrorism Policing led the investigation into the attacks, although some of the events were not treated as terror incidents. The Metropolitan Police publicly stated that they were investigating most of the events as antisemitic attacks, including the ambulance arson attack, Finchley synagogue firebombing, Hendon charity attack, Kenton synagogue attack, Golders Green stabbings, and Tower Hamlets synagogue attack. For the memorial wall and apartment building attacks in Golders Green, the police said they were keeping an open mind about the motive; for the former, a source told ITV News that it was not currently being considered as antisemitic.

By 6 May, authorities had arrested over 80 individuals in the UK for planning and carrying out the antisemitic attacks. In connection with the Hatzola attack, four people—British nationals Hamza Iqbal, 20, Rehan Khan, 19, and Judex Atshatshi, 18, and dual British-Pakistani national Saif Ali, 18—were charged with arson with intent to damage property and being reckless as to whether life would be endangered. On 28 August, the men pleaded guilty at the Old Bailey. Subhan Ahmed, 18, who is alleged to have helped to get rid of the car used in the attack, pleaded not guilty to a charge of assisting an offender.

On the same day as the Finchley Reform Synagogue firebombing, two people—a 47-year-old woman and a 46-year-old man—were arrested in connection with the attack. Mayor of London Sadiq Khan said: "I'm grateful to the Met Police for their swift response to the appalling attempted arson attack at Finchley Reform Synagogue overnight. The incident is being treated as an antisemitic hate crime, and there is an increased police presence in place in the local area." Following the embassy attack, a 39-year-old man was arrested under the Terrorism Act 2000. In the days following the Hendon charity attack, a man was arrested in connection to the incident. The night after the Kenton synagogue attack, a 17-year-old boy and 19-year-old man were arrested in connection with the incident. Nine additional people were arrested between 19 and 22 April for planning to commit arson attacks targeting the Jewish community in London. The 26th arrest was a 37-year-old man from Devon, arrested on suspicion of preparing terrorist acts against the Jewish community in London. For the Golders Green knife attack, a 45-year-old man was arrested on suspicion of attempted murder, with specialist officers from Counter Terrorism Policing leading the investigation, with all possible motives being considered.

On 15 May, the US justice department charged Iraq national Mohammad Baqer Saad Dawood al-Saadi for his involvement in this and other incidents tied to his alleged role as an operative for the Iran-backed Iraqi paramilitary group Kata'ib Hezbollah and Iran’s IRGC. In June, two men, Dominic Charles-Turner and Moses Edwards, were charged with the arson attack on the former East London Central Synagogue building. The same month, a dual British and Iranian national from Ilford was charged with the arson attack on the memorial wall.

== Response ==
=== Policing ===
In response to the attacks, police resources were significantly stepped up in the Jewish community in northwest London in a large, multi-pronged campaign called Operation Compertum. Several hundreds of additional uniformed and plain-clothed officers were placed in areas with large Jewish populations, including specialist teams employing firearms, the mounted branch, and drones. Extra stop and search powers were introduced in Barnet. Armed response vehicles and Counter Terrorism Policing resources were deployed to the area to support the increased local policing plan. Officers from Project Servator were also deployed, who are trained in behavioural detection to spot that someone is acting suspiciously such as gathering information or preparing for an attack.

Jonathan Hall KC, the Independent Reviewer of Terrorism Legislation, described the London antisemitic attacks as "the biggest national security emergency" in almost a decade. He described London as being "under attack" by Iran, with Iran intending to "sow fear, division and tie up resources". Hall recommended the Government to pass legislation to proscribe the IRGC. After the Golders Green attack, the UK threat level was raised from substantial to severe, which the head of counterterrorism policing attributed to increasing Islamist and right-wing threats to the public and an elevated threat to Jewish and Israeli individuals and institutions. The government also declared antisemitism as an emergency.

On 6 May, the Metropolitan Police announced a dedicated Community Protection Team of initially 100 additional officers, combining neighbourhood policing with specialist protection and counter-terrorism capabilities. The team was focused on protecting London's Jewish community in response to heightened hate-crime, terrorism and hostile-state threats. The police were also deploying an additional 1,000 officer shifts per week, while £18 million in additional government funding for protective policing was ringfenced for the force. Mayor of London Sadiq Khan welcomed the development of the Community Protection Team, which would help tackle the "series of antisemitic acts of violence that have targeted Jewish people, synagogues, homes and charities".

On 24 August, the London Assembly launched a review of the response to what it described as a series of antisemitic arson and terror attacks that targeted London's Jewish community.

=== Politics ===
On 21 April 2026, Prime Minister Keir Starmer said that the government will do "everything in our power to keep British Jews safe", including "a fundamental reset of how we counter extremism" and additional funding to deploy specialist officers. Starmer added "We won't relent in our fight against antisemitism and terror. Any perpetrators will feel the full force of the law." Starmer visited Golders Green on 30 April, where he was heckled by protestors, who criticized a lack of action against the antisemitic attacks. The same day, Starmer delivered an address to the nation from 10 Downing Street, in which he recognised the London Jewish community's fear to show their identity and practise their religion, and committed to strengthen the visible police presence in Jewish communities and to fast-track powers to tackle threats.

The Conservative Party leader Kemi Badenoch described the attacks as an "epidemic of violence against Jewish people", with the Jewish community being "under constant attack". Badenoch concluded: "It is now a national emergency and needs to be treated as such by the government and public authorities." Reform UK leader Nigel Farage described the incidents as a "national disgrace", criticising the government for not addressing the "root causes", including incitement, religious indoctrination, media bias, and tolerance of antisemitic and anti-Zionist discrimination. The party's home affairs spokesman Zia Yusuf linked the attacks to illegal migrant crossings on the English Channel, stating that it is clear that some of the military-aged Iranian men crossing the Channel on small boats are "almost certainly IRGC operatives".

The leader of the Green Party, Zack Polanski, who is Jewish, expressed concern over the arson attacks, but added: "Now, there's a conversation to be had about whether it's a perception of unsafety or whether it's actual unsafety, but neither are acceptable." Polanski's comments received significant backlash from some within the Jewish community. Starmer described it as "disgraceful" to suggest fears of attacks on Jews were merely "a perception of reality", while the Liberal Democrats leader Ed Davey said he was "shocked" by Polanski's "outrageous" comment, adding: "How dare he say it's perception. It's a reality." Polanski refused to apologise for his comment.

=== Community ===
Following the Hatzola ambulance arson attack, an online fundraiser raised more than £3.2 million for the charity. Chief Rabbi Sir Ephraim Mirvis said that "a sustained campaign of violence and intimidation against the Jewish community of the UK is gathering momentum", stressing that we cannot wait for fatalities "before we understand just how dangerous this moment is for all of our society." Archbishop of Canterbury Dame Sarah Mullally sent the Jewish community her "wholehearted support, solidarity and prayers", adding: "An attack on Jewish people is an attack on us all—we must stand together against the virulence of antisemitism that brings only violence, fear and hatred."

Following the Finchley synagogue attack, over 20 community groups came together to show support for the synagogue. This included the local Somali Bravanese community, many of whom arrived in the area as refugees, and whose own centre was destroyed in an arson attack in 2013, after which the synagogue offered their space for the community to use for prayers during Ramadan for four years.

== See also ==
- Antisemitism in the United Kingdom
- Iranian external operations
- 2025 Manchester synagogue attack
- 2026 RAF Fairford arrests
