= Harakat Ashab al-Yamin al-Islamia =

Militant group

- حركة أصحاب اليمين الإسلامية
- Logo of the group
- Other name: Ashab al-Yamin
- Founded: 2024; 2 years ago
- Dates active: March 2026 – present
- Allegiance: (Iran) Islamic Revolutionary Guard Corps (alleged)
- Ideology: Khomeinism; Anti-Zionism

Harakat Ashab al-Yamin al-Islamia (Arabic: حركة أصحاب اليمين الإسلامية, lit. 'Islamic Movement of the People of the Right Hand'), commonly known as Ashab al-Yamin or HAYI, is a pro-Iranian Islamist group that has claimed to have been responsible for attacks against Jewish schools, synagogues and charities in Europe, and American, Israeli and Iranian opposition targets, since March 2026. The group's activities have primarily focused on attacks on London's Jewish community, with additional attacks across Europe.

The attacks have been investigated by counter-terrorism police, with 37 arrests made; the UK proscribed HAYI as a national security threat. Analysts from the International Centre for Counter-Terrorism (ICCT) and European authorities have questioned the group's being an independent terrorist organization, suggesting it may be a front group for the Islamic Revolutionary Guard Corps (IRGC), who outsource the attacks to local criminals and use the group to create plausible deniability.

== History and operations ==
HAYI's Telegram account was established in 2024 but lay dormant until early March 2026, following US-Israeli strikes on Iran on February 28, after which Europol warned of elevated risk of attacks in Europe targeting Jewish and US-linked sites. It became known through videos posted on the Telegram channels of Iran-allied militant groups. It claims to be a Khomeneist group in that it embraces the beliefs of Ruhollah Khomeini, the first supreme leader of Iran. Its name refers to the depiction of Judgement Day in Islam, where the people of the right hand will go to Paradise. The group's logo, with a hand holding a rifle against a globe, invokes similar logos of Iran-backed Shia militias in Lebanon and Iraq. The organization claims operations by distributing "proof-of-crime" videos via Telegram channels.

== Claimed activities ==
HAYI has claimed to have been responsible for attacks across Europe that have targeted Jewish schools, synagogues and charities, and American, Israeli and Iranian opposition establishments. The attacks have generally utilized arson, explosive devices and chemicals, with the incidents taking place at night and with buildings as targets. HAYI has claimed responsibility for some incidents, while others were successfully foiled by authorities. Incidents include the following:

- On March 9, a makeshift bomb was used to target a synagogue in Liège, Belgium, causing material damage but no injuries. Prime minister Bart De Wever described it as "an attack on our values and our society", and interior minister Bernard Quintin called it a "despicable antisemitic act".
- On March 13, an arson attack targeted a synagogue in Rotterdam, Netherlands. Dutch police subsequently arrested five suspects, aged 17–19, from Tilburg, whom prosecutors alleged acted with "terrorist intent". Justice Minister David van Weel said the possibility that Iran was involved in the attack was being investigated.
- On March 14, an bomb exploded outside a Jewish school in Amsterdam, Netherlands. Prime minister Rob Jetten called the incidents "shocking and unacceptable", adding that "these cowardly acts have an impact on the entire Jewish community in the Netherlands".
- On March 15, an improvised explosive device was detonated at the Atrium office complex in Amsterdam’s Zuidas business district. The explosion targeted a branch of the Bank of New York Mellon, causing property damage but no fatalities.
- On March 23, four ambulances belonging to the Jewish charity Hatzola were destroyed by arson in Golders Green, London. CCTV footage of the incident captured three hooded individuals pouring an accelerant onto the vehicles, which led to the explosion of onboard oxygen cylinders. Four people—Hamza Iqbal, 20, Rehan Khan, 19, Judex Atshatshi, 18, and an unnamed 17-year-old boy—were charged with arson with intent to damage property and being reckless as to whether life would be endangered.
- On March 24, a car was set on fire in Antwerp's Jewish quarter in what Belgian authorities suspected was an antisemitic attack. Two minors were arrested in connection with the incident.
- On March 28, French police foiled a plot against a Bank of America office in Paris, France, as one suspect was attempting to light a bomb. Four people were arrested, with the National Terrorism Prosecution Office saying it planned to charge them with criminal conspiracy to commit terrorist acts, as well as manufacturing an explosive device in connection with a terrorist enterprise.
- HAYI claimed responsibility for an attack on a synagogue in Skopje, North Macedonia, on 12 April, saying it was because it was a "symbol of the historical and cultural identity of Jews of this region" and had a "deep connection with the Zionist regime." Security services made two arrests at the end of the month and linked it to Islamic State. In May, the US Justice Department alleged that an Iraqi national they had in custody, Mohammad Al-Saadi, had posted a video four days after the attack showing the site of the attack with a red target symbol and surveillance footage of the synagogue on fire, with the logo of Harakat Ashab al-Yamin al-Islamiya in the upper right corner of the images.
- On April 15, the London Metropolitan Police opened investigations into two more London incidents claimed by HAYI: an attempted arson outside a Persian-language media organization in Park Royal and a petrol bomb attack on Finchley Reform Synagogue, with arrests the following day.
- On April 17, HAYI claimed it was planning an attack on the Israeli Embassy in London using "dangerous substances". Discarded items—including two jars containing a powdered substance—were discovered in Kensington Gardens near the embassy building, but no attack took place and no injuries or damage were reported. The items were found to not contain any harmful or hazardous substances. A 39-year-old man was arrested under the Terrorism Act for the incident.
- On April 17, a bag containing bottles of fluid was lit in the doorway of a building in Hendon, London formerly occupied by the charity Jewish Futures. The bottles failed to fully ignite and only caused minor scorch marks.
- On April 19, a bottle containing an accelerant was thrown through a window of Kenton United Synagogue, London, causing damage to the synagogue's medical room. Overnight, a 17-year-old boy and 19-year-old man were arrested for the attack.
- On April 29, two Jewish people—one in his 70s and one in his 30s—were stabbed and injured on Golders Green Road by a British national from Somalia. Harakat Ashab al-Yamin al-Islamia claimed responsibility for the attack an hour after it happened, putting out footage of the attack 40 minutes later, but investigators said the claim was likely opportunistic. Tech Against Terrorism said that if the claim was genuine, it would signal "significant escalation": "By claiming an incident involving physical casualties, HAYI is signalling willingness to associate its brand with direct violence, even if the group did not direct, enable, or have prior knowledge of the attack."

== Organization and structure ==
Western security services, European authorities, and specialist bodies such as the International Centre for Counter-Terrorism (ICCT) and Tech Against Terrorism believe HAYI to be a front group for the Islamic Revolutionary Guard Corps (IRGC), who outsource attacks to local 'thugs-for-hire' and use the group to create plausible deniability. In that regard, HAYI can be seen as an astroturfed brand rather than a grassroots organization. According to the ICCT, four channels—"two linked to Iraqi militias including Asaib Ahl al-Haq, which maintains ties to the IRGC's Quds Force, and two pro-Iranian content aggregators with links to sanctioned pro-Russian networks"—anchor every dissemination cycle. The establishment of HAYI sits within a larger pattern of Iranian state-sponsored terrorism and hybrid warfare.

The individuals who carried out the attacks are described as potentially amateurs, disaffected teenagers and petty criminals, who have been recruited to conduct the acts for small fees. Arrests in London and Rotterdam have largely been of minors, and in France have been three minors and one adult, all recruited via social media. A researcher at the ICCT said "There is a controller, a multilayered system, a cell leader who is supposed to carry something out but is being guided. He is on the phone with someone—we still don't know who—and receives materials almost ready for the attack". Although some of these perpetrators may not be ideologically motivated terrorists, they may still face severe prosecution under the UK National Security Act, according to terrorism expert Roger Macmillan.

The Israeli Ministry of Diaspora Affairs and Combating Antisemitism noted that the group's name shares nomenclature with an Iraqi militia previously designated as a terrorist organization by the United States. Israeli officials suggested that the timing of the group's activation may be linked to reports of the death of a high-ranking pro-Iranian militia leader in Iraq, raising the possibility that the European attacks were intended as retaliation. Experts have highlighted several "unsophisticated" errors that deviate from standard Islamist rhetoric and indicate involvement from individuals outside of Iran. The group's Arabic logo misspells the word "Islamic" (al-Islamia), and its imagery features a Soviet SVD Dragunov sniper rifle instead of the AK-47 motifs standard among Iran-backed proxies. Analysts also noted a total absence of Persian in the group's communications.

Following the arrest of Mohammad Baqer Saad Dawood al-Saadi, a commander of the Iran-backed Iraqi paramilitary group Kata'ib Hezbollah, court documents showed that al-Saadi coordinated the HAYI attacks from Baghdad, Iraq. Messages were initially posted on Telegram and Snapchat to send secret activation instructions to terrorist networks in Europe. Al-Saadi was seen on video calls with the individuals carrying out attacks for HAYI. Julian Lanchès of the ICCT said that al-Saadi was likely not running the social media channels himself or coordinating the attacks alone.

== Investigation and response ==
In the United Kingdom, by 27 April a total of 26 individuals had been arrested for planning and conducting a series of attacks, most linked to HAYI. In response to the attacks, police resources were significantly stepped up in northwest London: additional uniformed and plain-clothed officers were deployed in areas with Jewish populations, and extra stop and search powers were introduced in Barnet. Additionally, armed response vehicles and counter-terrorism policing resources were deployed to the area.

On 15 May, the US Justice Department charged Iraqi national Mohammad Baqer Saad Dawood al-Saadi for his involvement in several of the incidents, tied to his alleged role as an operative for the Iran-backed Iraqi paramilitary group Kata'ib Hezbollah and Iran's Islamic Revolutionary Guard Corps (IRGC). They linked him to 18 European attacks (particularly the 15 March Amsterdam incident and the 12 April Skopje attack) and two in Canada, and planned incidents targeting synagogues in the US.

In June 2026, a group of Western and allied states, including Albania, Australia, Belgium, Bulgaria, Canada, Czech Republic, Denmark, Estonia, France, Finland, Germany, Ireland, Latvia, Lithuania, the Netherlands, New Zealand, North Macedonia, Norway, Portugal, Sweden, United Kingdom and the United States, issued a joint statement condemning Iran's usage of international and local criminal networks to carry out attacks across North America, Australia and Europe, such as the recent HAYI-claimed-attacks in Europe. In July 2026, the British government designated the organization under the National Security (State Threats) Act 2026.

=== Reactions ===
- Israel: Diaspora Affairs Minister Amichai Chikli stated that the group represents a "new face" of Iranian efforts to export terrorism to European soil and called for increased security cooperation.
- Netherlands: Justice Minister David van Weel confirmed an Iranian link is being "explicitly investigated," but noted that no conclusive connection has yet been proven.
- United Kingdom: Prime Minister Keir Starmer and the Metropolitan Police characterized the 23 March London arson as a "shocking antisemitic hate crime." On 5 May, after the knife attack, he called for a "whole of society" approach to antisemitism, and noted that one of the lines of inquiry was "whether a foreign state has been behind some of these incidents": "Our message to Iran, or to any other country that might seek to foment violence, hatred or division in society, is that it will not be tolerated."

== See also ==
- Front for the Liberation of Lebanon from Foreigners
