= Son of the Devil =

Son of the Devil may refer to:

== People ==
- Şeytanoğlu ("Son of the Devil") (1510–1578), Ottoman Greek magnate
- El Hijo del Diablo ("The Son of the Devil") (born 1962), Mexican professional wrestler

== See also ==
- Aaron, Son of the Devil, a 1277 English antisemitic caricature
- Sons of the Devil, an American comic book series
