= 2026 Golders Green stabbings =

Knife attacks in London

- Part of 2026 London antisemitic attacks
- Location: London, England
- Date: 29 April 2026; 11:15–11:20 BST (UTC+1)
- Attack type: Mass stabbing, terrorist attack, attempted murder
- Weapon: Knife
- Deaths: 0
- Injuries: 4

On 29 April 2026, two Jewish men were stabbed in the street in the Golders Green area of North London, England. The suspect had earlier tried to murder his own friend, a Muslim man, in Southwark. The suspect, a 45-year-old born in Somalia, was arrested by police and charged with attempted murder.

The attacks on the two Jewish men were initially declared terrorist incidents by the Metropolitan Police. The Met later said it was treating the attacks as suspected hate crimes rather than terrorist attacks. In May 2026, the United States Justice Department charged Iraqi national Mohammad Baqer Saad Dawood al-Saadi for his involvement in this and other incidents tied to his alleged role as an operative for the Iran-backed Iraqi paramilitary group Kata'ib Hezbollah and Iran’s Islamic Revolutionary Guard Corps (IRGC).

== Background ==
According to the Community Security Trust charity, antisemitic attacks soared in the UK since the October 7 attacks and the advent of the Gaza war in October 2023. In October 2025, two worshippers were killed in an antisemitic terror attack at Heaton Park synagogue. A series of antisemitic attacks were committed against Jewish institutions in the UK in March and April 2026. On 23 March, ambulances operated by Hatzolah were destroyed by arson in Golders Green. Subsequently, a series of arson attacks were launched against several synagogues and Jewish community institutions in London.

Responsibility for many of the attacks was claimed by Harakat Ashab al-Yamin al-Islamia, which is believed to be a front group for Iran's Islamic Revolutionary Guard Corps (IRGC). The IRGC allegedly outsourced the acts to local criminals to maintain plausible deniability.

On 27 April, there was an arson attack on a memorial in Golders Green to protesters killed during the 2025–2026 Iranian protests and to victims of the 7 October Nova music festival massacre in Israel. Two people from Romford were arrested in early May.

== Attacks ==
The attacker was in the care of South London and Maudsley NHS Foundation Trust and had been staying in supported accommodation in south-east London for people leaving secure hospital.

=== Southwark ===
On the morning of 29 April 2026 the attacker visited a long-term friend's home in Southwark and tried to stab him in the upper body with a knife; the friend fended off the attack, sustaining minor injuries. The attacker then took public transport to Brent Cross tube station.

=== Golders Green ===
The attacker arrived in Golders Green in north-west London shortly after 11 AM. At 11:15 BST, a man was attacked and chased in Highfield Avenue. Shortly after, at 11:20 BST, another man was repeatedly attacked at the bus stop. The two injured men were treated at the scene by Hatzola and taken to hospital. Both men were Jewish; one was a US-UK dual national.

The attacker was followed into a greengrocer's shop by a bystander, who barricaded him inside for a short time while police were called. A 45‑year‑old man was arrested after being tasered and detained by police, who were assisted by Shomrim volunteers. He then fled, but was blocked by a Shomrim volunteer's car. He attempted to stab police officers before being tasered, and was then tackled to the ground by a second Shomrim volunteer.

Police announced hours after the attack that they were treating the stabbings as terrorism, as the suspect allegedly went out with the intention of stabbing "visibly Jewish" looking people.

The Iran-linked group Harakat Ashab al-Yamin al-Islamia claimed responsibility for the attack, but a link has not been confirmed.

== Investigation and charges ==
Commissioner Mark Rowley stated that the suspect had a "history of serious violence and mental health issues". It was later confirmed that the suspect was a 45-year-old British national, born in Somalia, who came to the United Kingdom as a child in the early 1990s. He had previously been referred to the government's Prevent counter-terrorism programme in 2020, although that referral was closed the same year.

Following his arrest, the suspect was treated briefly in hospital and held in police custody under the Police and Criminal Evidence Act while officers continued their investigation, including searches at an address in south-east London. The suspect was charged with the attempted murder of three people.

On 5 May, prime minister Keir Starmer said one of the lines of inquiry was "whether a foreign state has been behind some of these incidents".

On 15 May, the United States Justice Department charged Iraqi national Mohammad Baqer Saad Dawood al-Saadi for his involvement in this and other incidents tied to his alleged role as an operative for the Iran-backed Iraqi paramilitary group Kata'ib Hezbollah and Iran’s Islamic Revolutionary Guard Corps (IRGC).

On 28 September, the Metropolitan police said that the Crown Prosecution Service (CPS) would not pursue a terrorist connection in relation to the stabbing of the two Jewish men. The CPS stated there was sufficient evidence for Suleiman’s actions to be treated as a hate crime, which could be presented as an aggravating factor in the sentence.

== Reporting criticised ==
Barry Malone, writing in Middle East Eye, said that Associated Press and BBC News published articles that mentioned only the two Jewish men of the three victims, and not the Muslim man. The New Arab said that much of the media reporting concentrated more on the stabbings of two Jewish men in north London, giving less attention to the earlier attack on the Muslim man, including BBC News. It also said that the police were accused of glossing over the attack on the Muslim man. Journalist Mehdi Hasan questioned why the Metropolitan Police had initially reported the attacks as having only two victims, which he described as "airbrushing" over the Muslim man's stabbing. Media coverage of the stabbings was criticised by member of parliament Ayoub Khan and columnist Owen Jones.

== Reactions ==
=== Domestic ===
The UK government held a Cabinet Office Briefing Rooms (COBR) meeting to organise its response to the attack. Prime minister Keir Starmer described the attack as "deeply concerning" and "utterly appalling". King Charles III said he was "deeply concerned" about the attack, expressing particular concern for its impact on the Jewish community and offering his thoughts and prayers to the victims, and thanking those who assisted at the scene. London mayor Sadiq Khan said he was "angry," "appalled", and "disgusted" that Jewish people were "living their lives frightened". On the day after the attack, Starmer visited the scene of the incidents and was heckled by a group of protesters who were holding signs and shouting "Keir Starmer, Jew Harmer".

British Muslim leaders, including the British Muslim Trust, made strong statements of solidarity the same day. Muslim and Jewish women interfaith activists joined in a solidarity march in the area of the attack.

Conservative Party leader Kemi Badenoch and Liberal Democrats leader Ed Davey additionally called for increased police presence and more protective security measures for the Jewish community, respectively. Reform UK leader Nigel Farage said "this is not just an attack on Jewish people. This is much bigger, much broader, much more fundamental, and if you're the group currently being targeted, well, who's next?"

Zack Polanski, leader of the Green Party of England and Wales, condemned the attack as "horrendous". He also retweeted a post on X accusing the police of "repeatedly and violently kicking a mentally ill man in the head" after he had been tasered. Metropolitan Police Commissioner Mark Rowley defended how officers arrested the attacker and said he was "disappointed" at the way Polanski had promoted "inaccurate and misinformed commentary", also stating that Polanski was interfering with operational policing. Polanski's comments were also condemned by Starmer, prompting Polanski to apologise for "sharing a tweet in haste".

After the attack, the UK threat level was raised from substantial to severe. The UK Government said that the increase in the threat level was not only because of the Golders Green attack, but had also been influenced by an increase in Islamist and extreme right-wing threats to the public. However, the government also announced a day after the attack that they are facing an antisemitism emergency.

In response to the attack, Starmer, Chief Rabbi Ephraim Mirvis, and Jonathan Hall, the Independent Reviewer of Terrorism Legislation, called for a ban on pro-Palestinian marches.

On 5 May, Starmer made a speech calling for a "whole of society" approach to tackling antisemitism.

On 14 May, King Charles III visited the victims of the attack.

=== International ===
Israeli prime minister Benjamin Netanyahu criticised Starmer's response, saying "words are not enough to confront this scourge". Foreign minister Gideon Sa'ar condemned Starmer's response, saying that the UK "can no longer claim this is under control" and that "decisive and urgent" action is needed against antisemitism. Israeli president Isaac Herzog said he was "horrified by yet another violent attack on Jews in broad daylight on the streets of London", and called on the British Government to "take urgent and immediate action before the next antisemitic attack occurs".

== See also ==
- 2026 Edinburgh attacks
