= Bell Review =

The Bell Review is an ongoing independent review into antisemitism in schools and colleges in England, led by Sir David Bell.

The review found that antisemitism toward pupils has reached record levels.

The National Education Union opposed the adoption of the IHRA definition of antisemitism.
