= East London Central Synagogue =

Synagogue building in Tower Hamlets, London

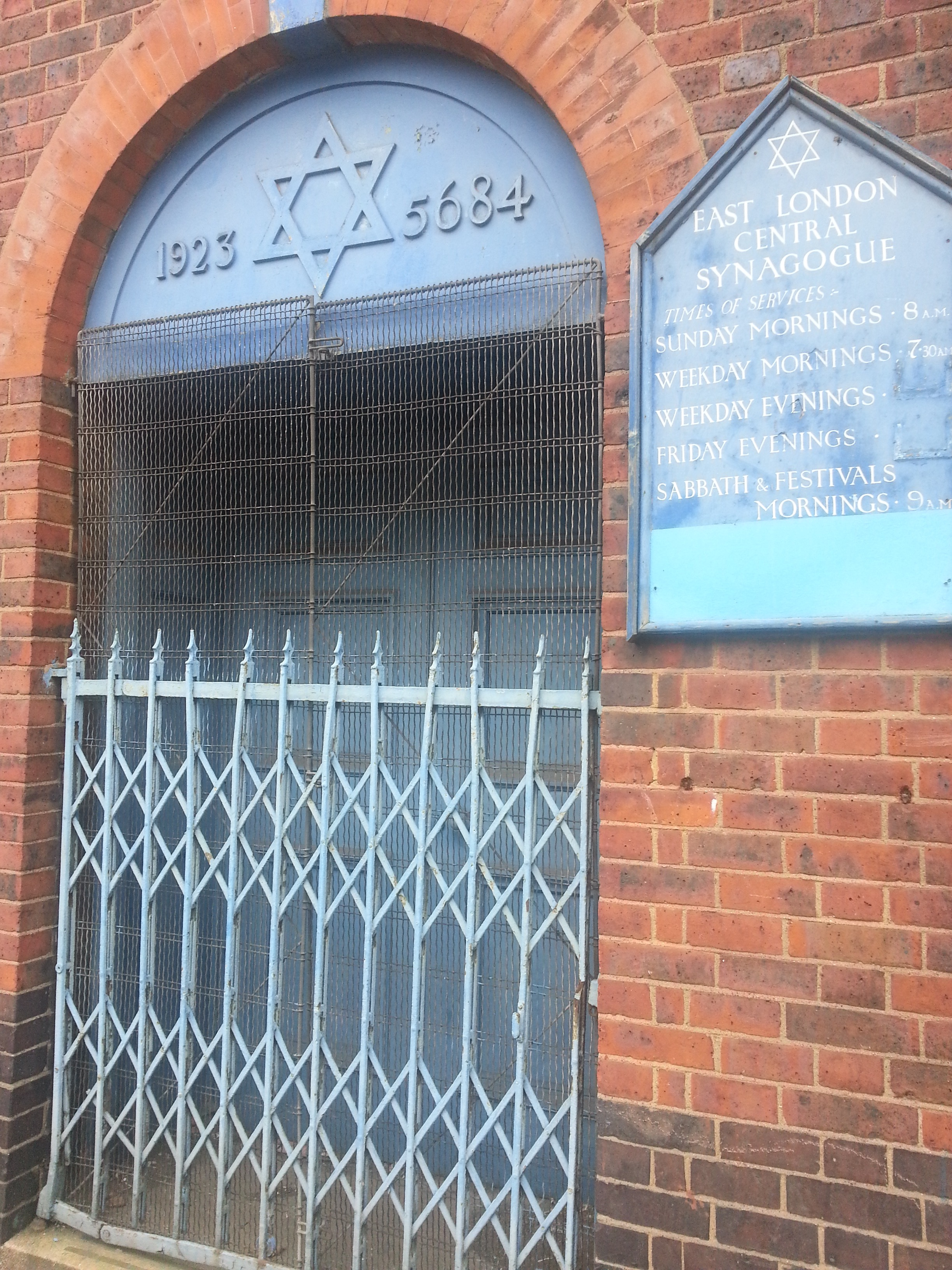
- The synagogue entrance in 2013

- Location of the synagogue in Greater London

Religion
- Affiliation: Orthodox Judaism
- Rite: Nusach Ashkenaz
- Ecclesiastical or organisational status: Synagogue
- Status: Inactive

Location
- Location: 40 Nelson Street, East End of London, England E1 2DE
- Country: United Kingdom
- Coordinates: 51°30′55″N 0°03′36″W

Architecture
- Architect: Lewis Solomon
- Established: 1923 (as a congregation)
- Completed: 1923
- Materials: Brick

The East London Central Synagogue is a former Orthodox Jewish congregation synagogue, located on Nelson Street in the London Borough of Tower Hamlets, England, in the United Kingdom. When founded in 1923, its name was the Nelson Street Sfardish Synagogue. It has "an unassuming exterior and a stunningly beautiful interior". The congregation worshipped in the Ashkenazi rite. The synagogue's building, on Nelson Street, ceased functioning in 2020 and was put up for sale in 2026.

== History ==
In the early twentieth century, the East End was a new centre of Jewish life in England: in the compact area there was a population of around 250,000 Jews. Mostly they were Yiddish-speaking first-generation immigrants from Eastern Europe, unlike the established Ashkenazi and Sephardi communities in Britain, which in the main had come from the Low Countries. Serving this community were about 150 synagogues. As a consequence of the Second World War, which saw the East End heavily bombed, this population moved on to new Jewish centres in North and North-west London such as those in Stamford Hill, Golders Green and Hendon, and the congregations of the East End synagogues consolidated. About twenty neighbouring synagogues were amalgamated with it over the years, including: Belz, Berditchever, Buross Street, Cannon Street Road, Chevra Shas, Commercial Road Great, Grove Street, Jubilee Street, Mile End, New Road, Philpot Street Great, Philpot Street Sphardish, Rumanian Sidney Street, and Sons of Britchan (B'nai Brichtan). As a consequence of these amalgamations the shul had a large collection of Torah scrolls, some dating back to the 18th century, many of now unknown origin.

== Architecture ==
In his second volume on London, published in 1951, the architectural historian Sir Nikolaus Pevsner recorded that the synagogue was built by Lewis Solomon and Son, and described it thus: "Discreet brick exterior with two tiers of windows beneath round-headed arches with stone keystones. Fine classical interior. Galleries with iron railings between Ionic columns; coved steps, framed by a Venetian arch on Doric columns. Above the Ark, scrolled pediment with tablets of the law and Lions of Judah. Panelled pews and Bimah".

Lewis Solomon (1848–1928) had built several synagogues, and served as both the Federation of Synagogues' Honorary Architect and also the United Synagogue's Architect and Surveyor. By 1923 his practice was being run by his son Digby Lewis Solomon (1884–1962). Lewis Solomon and Son had, two years earlier, redesigned the premises occupied by the neighbouring Congregation of Jacob synagogue on Commercial Road, which also still survives.

== Modern existence ==
The shul belonged to the Orthodox Federation of Synagogues. The term "Sfardish" in the original name indicates that the shul, while Ashkenazi, follows Nusach Sefard, a prayer liturgy influenced by the Rabbi Isaac Luria's attempts to reconcile the Ashkenazi and Sephardi liturgies.

The East End now has a very considerable Muslim population, with which the shul actively maintained interfaith relations through the Tower Hamlets Inter Faith Forum, of which the large East London Mosque on Whitechapel Road is also a member. The building was also regularly visited by historical societies and walking tours, and has in the past participated in Open House London.

The architect Maxwell Hutchinson had drawn up a plan for adding museum and library space, so that the shul could increase its standing as a tourist destination and allow it to become a historic Jewish centre.

In January 2018 there was a march to the synagogue from Aldgate to commemorate the East End's Jewish heritage, followed by a multi-faith service of remembrance in which the Deputy Mayor of Tower Hamlets took part. In 2020 it was reported that the synagogue ceiling had collapsed, resulting in the cancellation of services.

In February 2026, a Muslim group announced that it had put down a deposit on the building, with the goal of eventually turning it into a mosque.

On 5 May 2026 a fire broke out at the building. It was quickly extinguished and only caused light damage, but evidence suggests that the incident was an attempted arson, one of several made on synagogues during the 2026 London antisemitic attacks in April and May 2026.

== See also ==
- History of the Jews in England
- List of Jewish communities in the United Kingdom
- List of synagogues in the United Kingdom
