= Yellow badge =

Badge forced to be worn by Jews

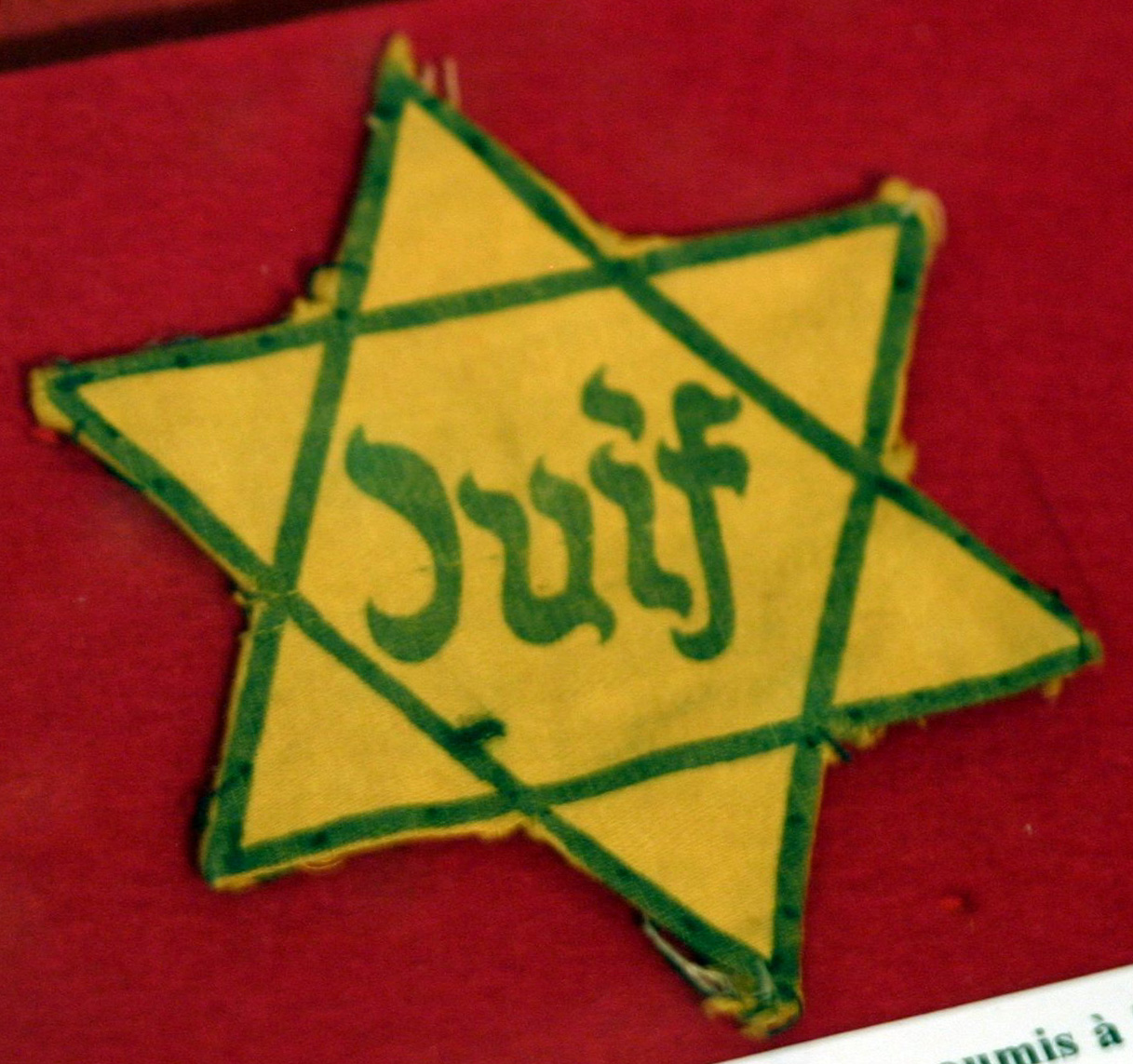
Yellow star labeled Juif, the French term for Jew, that was worn during the Nazi occupation of France

The yellow badge, also known as the yellow patch, the Jewish badge, or the yellow star (German: Judenstern, lit. 'Jew's star'), was an accessory that Jews were required to wear in certain non-Jewish societies throughout history. A Jew's ethno-religious identity, which would be denoted by the badge, would help to mark them as an outsider. Legislation that mandated Jewish subjects wear such items has been documented in some Middle Eastern caliphates and in some European kingdoms during the medieval period and the early modern period. The most recent usage of yellow badges was during World War II, when Jews living in Nazi Germany and German-occupied Europe were ordered to wear a yellow Star of David to keep their Jewish identity disclosed to the public in the years leading up to the Holocaust.

== History ==
=== Muslim world ===
The practice of wearing special clothing or markings to distinguish Jews and other non-Muslims (dhimmis) in Muslim-dominated countries seems to have been introduced in the Umayyad Caliphate by Caliph Umar II in the early 8th century. In the 9th century, Islamic authorities began to harden their attitude on ghiyār (غيار), differentiating non-Muslims from Muslims. The Abbasid caliph al-Mutawakkil issued a decree in 850 that ordered Jews and Christians to wear the zunnar (زنار), honey-coloured outer garments and badge-like patches on their clothing and their servants' clothing. This began the long tradition of differentiation by colour, though the colour and badges would change with time and place.

The clothing was also enforced outside of the Islamic heartlands. In Aghlabid Northern Africa and Sicily dhimmis were required to wear a patch (Arabic: رقعة, ruq'a) of white fabric on the shoulder of their outer garment, with the patch for Jews being in the image of an ape and for Christians in the image of a pig. It is not clear how long this humiliating decree remained in force, but it is clear that in the Maghrebi case, the purpose of the patch was not merely ghiyār 'differentiation' but also dhull (ذل, 'humiliation'), in keeping with the qoranic injunction (Sura 9:29) that non-Muslims should be humbled. A genizah document from 1121 gives the following description of decrees issued in Baghdad:

Two yellow badges [are to be displayed], one on the headgear and one on the neck. Furthermore, each Jew must hang round his neck a piece of lead weighing [3 grams] with the word dhimmi on it. He also has to wear a belt around his waist. The women have to wear one red and one black shoe and have a small bell on their necks or shoes.

The Jews of Egypt were forced in 1005 to wear the zunnar on their garments and a wooden calf to remind them of the golden one. In the late 12th century, the Almohads forced the Jews of North Africa to wear yellow cloaks and turbans, a practice the subsequent Hafsid dynasty continued to follow. In 1250, under Hafsid caliph al-Mustansir, Jews had to wear some sort of distinguishing badge (Arabic: شكيلة, shikla), though it is not exactly known how it looked and may have referred to both a special patch and an overall attire unique to Jews. At the same time, the Ayyubid Sultan decreed that the life and property of any Jew or Christian found in the street without a distinguishing badge (Arabic: علامة, 'alāma) or zunnar would be forfeit. In 1301, Jews were required to wear a yellow turban.

Mid-15th century reports describe the shikla as a piece of yellow cloth worn on the outer clothing that Tunisian Jews were obliged to wear. The shikla ceased to be used in Morocco from the 16th century, but it continued to be such a regular defining mark of Tunisian Jews up to the 19th century that they were commonly referred to as shikliyyūn ('those who wear the sign').

=== Medieval and early modern Europe ===
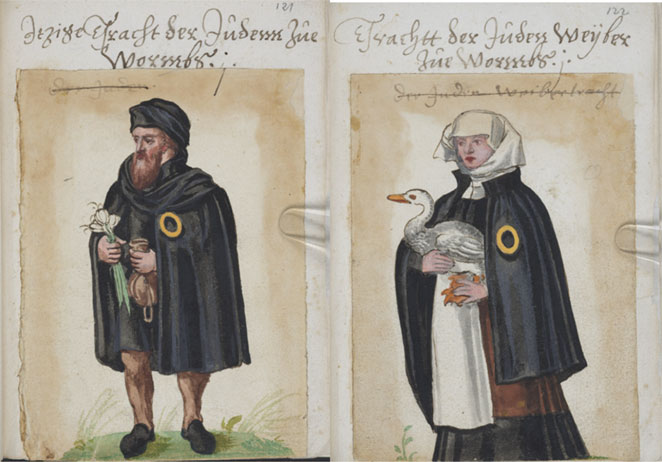
A 16th-century depiction of a Jewish couple from Worms, Germany, wearing the obligatory yellow badge; the man holds a moneybag and bulbs of garlic (often used in artistic portrayals of Jews in medieval Europe).

From the thirteenth century onwards, secular authorities in Medieval Europe started to distinguish different people, affecting both Christians and non-Christians, and occupations by distinguishing clothing. With the Fourth Council of the Lateran in 1215 headed by Pope Innocent III it was for the first time specifically declared that Jews and Muslims must wear distinguishing garb (Latin habitus). These measures were not seen as being inconsistent with the papal bulls Sicut Judaeis. While some historians argue that the reason was to keep Jews out of Christian society, many clothing restrictions also applied to Christians and the stated and likely reason was to prevent intermarriage and thus proselytisation. This wording of the council decree may have been influenced indirectly by the Muslim requirements for Jews.

Innocent III had in 1199 confirmed Sicut Judaeis, which was also confirmed by Pope Honorius III in 1216. In 1219, Honorius III issued a dispensation to the Jews of Castile, the largest Jewish population in Europe. Spanish Jews normally wore turbans, which presumably met the requirement to be distinctive. Elsewhere, local laws were introduced to bring the canon into effect. The identifying mark varied from one country to another, and from period to period.

In 1227, the Synod of Narbonne ruled:

That Jews may be distinguished from others, we decree and emphatically command that in the center of the breast (of their garments) they shall wear an oval badge, the measure of one finger in width and one half a palm in height.

However, these ecclesiastic pronouncements required legal sanctions of a temporal authority. In 1228, James I of Aragon ordered Jews of Aragon to wear the badge; and in 1265, the Siete Partidas, a legal code enacted in Castile by Alfonso X but not implemented until many years later, included a requirement for Jews to wear distinguishing marks. On 19 June 1269, Louis IX of France imposed a fine of ten livres (one livre was equivalent to a pound of silver) on Jews found in public without a badge (Latin: rota, lit. 'wheel', French: rouelle or roue). The enforcement of wearing the badge is repeated by local councils, with varying degrees of fines, at Arles 1234 and 1260, Béziers 1246, Albi 1254, Nîmes 1284 and 1365, Avignon 1326 and 1337, Rodez 1336, and Vanves 1368. The "rota" looked like a ring of white or yellow. The shape and colour of the patch also varied, although the colour was usually white or yellow. Married women were often required to wear two bands of blue on their veil or head-scarf.

In 1274, Edward I of England enacted the Statute of Jewry, which also included a requirement:

Each Jew, after he is seven years old, shall wear a distinguishing mark on his outer garment, that is to say, in the form of two Tables joined, of yellow felt of the length of six inches [150 mm] and of the breadth of three inches [75 mm].

In Europe, Jews were required to wear the Judenhut or pileum cornutum, a cone-shaped hat, in most cases yellow. In 1267, the Vienna city council ordered Jews to wear this type of hat rather than a badge. There is a reference from a dispensation to the badge in Erfurt on 16 October 1294, the earliest in Germany. There were also attempts to enforce the wearing of full-length robes, which in late 14th-century Rome were supposed to be red. In Portugal, a red Star of David was used.

Enforcement of the rules was variable; in Marseille the magistrates ignored accusations of breaches, and in some places individuals or communities could buy exemption. Cathars who were considered "first time offenders" by the Catholic Church and the Inquisition were also forced to wear yellow badges, albeit in the form of crosses, about their person.

The yellow badge remained the key distinguishing mark of Jewish dress in the Middle Ages. From the 16th century, the use of the Judenhut declined, but the badge survived into the 18th century in places.

=== Axis powers ===
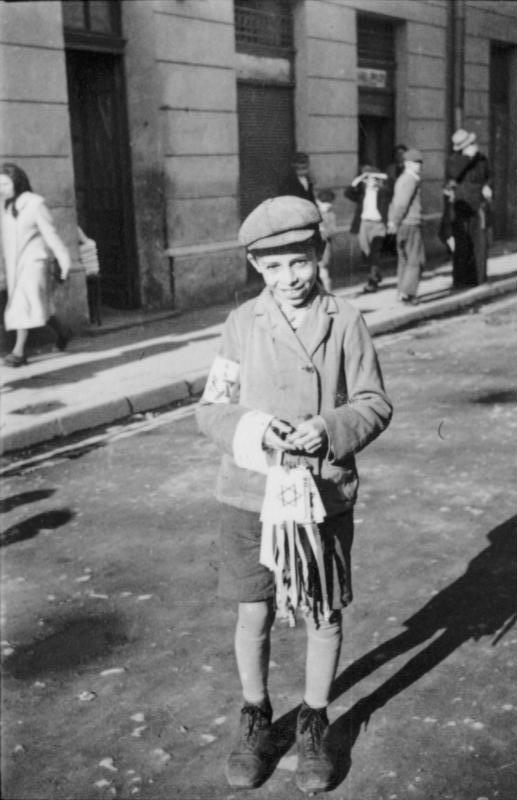
A Jewish boy in Radom with a Star of David armband

A crowd of Jews wearing white armbands with a blue Star of David, discrimination patches on a street in the Warsaw Ghetto in February 1941.

Jewish workers wearing yellow armbands with a black Star of David in Serbia in 1944.

After Nazi Germany's invasion of Poland in 1939, there were different local decrees requiring Jews to wear a distinctive sign under the General Government. The sign was a white armband with a blue Star of David on it; in the Warthegau a yellow badge in the form of a Star of David on the left side of the breast and on the back. The requirement to wear the Star of David with the word Jude (German for "Jew") – inscribed in faux Hebrew letters – was then extended to all Jews over the age of six in the Reich and the Protectorate of Bohemia and Moravia (by a decree issued on 1 September 1941, signed by Reinhard Heydrich) and was gradually introduced in other German-occupied areas, where local words were used (e.g. Juif in French, Jood in Dutch).

One observer reported that the star increased German non-Nazi sympathy for Jews as the impoverished citizens who wore them were, contrary to Nazi propaganda, obviously not the cause of German failure on the Eastern Front. In the Protectorate of Bohemia and Moravia, government had to ban hat tipping towards Jews and other courtesies that became popular as protests against the German occupation. A whispering campaign that claimed that the action was in response to the United States government requiring German Americans to wear swastikas was unsuccessful.

=== Post–World War II ===
In May 2001, the Taliban government in Afghanistan ruled that Hindus in the country must wear a yellow badge, causing international outcry.

In May 2021, in response to the anti-vaccine movement in the United States, hatWRKS, a hat store in Nashville, Tennessee, sold badges that resembled the yellow stars with the words "Not vaccinated" on them. Protestors rallied outside the store, and Stetson announced they would no longer sell hats to the store. The practice of wearing yellow stars in protests against responses to the COVID-19 pandemic spread to Montreal, London, Amsterdam and Paris, and was condemned by various Jewish advocacy groups and Holocaust survivors.

On 31 October 2023, Permanent Representative of Israel to the United Nations Gilad Erdan, as well as other Israeli delegates, began wearing yellow star badges with the words "Never Again" written on them, in protest to criticism of Israel's conduct during the Gaza war. Erdan claimed that the UN Security Council was "silent" about the October 7 attacks, and said that he would wear the star "as a symbol of pride". However, this decision was immediately condemned by Yad Vashem chairman Dani Dayan, calling it a "[disgrace to] the victims of the Holocaust as well as the state of Israel", pointing out that "the slaughter of Jews by Hamas" differs from the Holocaust in that "Jews have today a state and an army. We are not defenseless and at the mercy of others." According to Ynet, unnamed officials from Israel's Ministry of Foreign Affairs were also highly critical of the decision, with one calling it a "cheap gimmick that doesn't serve our goal", and others describing it as an attempt to appeal to Likud party members.

== Timeline ==
=== Caliphates ===
717–720
Caliph Umar II orders non-Muslims (dhimmi) to wear vestimentary distinctions (called giyār, غيار, 'distinguishing marks').
847–861
Caliph al-Mutawakkil reinforces and reissues the edict. Christians are required to wear patches. One of the patches was to be worn in front of the breast and the other on the back. They were required to be honey-coloured.
888
Ibrahim ibn Ahmad, the Aghlabid ruler of North Africa and Sicily, proclaims an order according to which Jews have to wear a patch depicting a monkey and Christians one depicting a pig.
1005
The Fatimid caliph al-Hakim forces Jews to wear black robes and a wooden image of a calf in public and a bell around their neck when in public baths (the same applies for Christians who have to wear a wooden cross around their neck in the baths).
1184–1199
The Almohad Yaqub al-Mansur orders that Jews must dress in Muslim fashion of mourning (dark blue or black). His successor requires Jews to wear yellow cloaks and turbans.
1249
The Ayyubid Sultan issues an order according to which the property and life of Jews or Christians which are found on the streets without a distinguishing badge is forfeit.
1450
The Algerian qadi Muhammad al-Uqbani and the Flemish traveller Anselm Adornes report that Tunisian Jews are obliged to wear a distinctive piece of yellow cloth on their clothing.

=== Medieval and early modern Europe ===
1215
The Fourth Council of the Lateran headed by Pope Innocent III declares: "Jews and Saracens of both sexes in every Christian province and at all times shall be marked off in the eyes of the public from other peoples through the character of their dress."
1219
Pope Honorius III issues a dispensation to the Jews of Castile. Spanish Jews normally wore turbans in any case, which presumably met the requirement to be distinctive.
1222
Archbishop of Canterbury Stephen Langton orders English Jews to wear a white band two fingers broad and four fingers long.
1227
The Synod of Narbonne rules: "That Jews may be distinguished from others, we decree and emphatically command that in the center of the breast (of their garments) they shall wear an oval badge, the measure of one finger in width and one half a palm in height."
1228
James I orders Jews of Aragon to wear the badge.

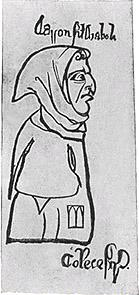
In the 1277 caricature Aaron, Son of the Devil, Aaron wears a badge with the Tablets of the Law.

1265
The Siete Partidas, a legal code enacted in Castile by Alfonso X but not implemented until many years later, includes a requirement for Jews to wear distinguishing marks.
1267
In a special session, the Vienna city council forces Jews to wear pileum cornutum (a cone-shaped head dress, common in medieval illustrations of Jews); a badge does not seem to have been worn in Austria.
1269
France. (Saint) Louis IX of France orders all Jews found in public without a badge (French: rouelle or roue, Latin: rota) to be fined ten livres of silver. The enforcement of wearing the badge is repeated by local councils, with varying degrees of fines, at Arles 1234 and 1260, Béziers 1246, Albi 1254, Nîmes 1284 and 1365, Avignon 1326 and 1337, Rodez 1336, and Vanves 1368.
1274
The Statute of Jewry in England, enacted by King Edward I, enforces the regulations. "Each Jew, after he is seven years old, shall wear a distinguishing mark on his outer garment, that is to say, in the form of two Tables joined, of yellow felt of the length of six inches [150 mm] and of the breadth of three inches [75 mm]."
1294
Erfurt. The earliest mention of the badge in Germany.
1315–1326
Emir Ismail Abu-I-Walid forces the Jews of Granada to wear the yellow badge.
1321
Henry II of Castile forces the Jews to wear the yellow badge.

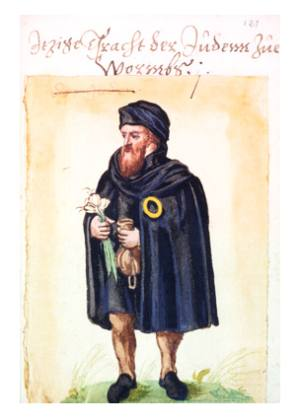
16th-century watercolour of a Jew from Worms, Germany. The rota or Jewish ring on the cloak, moneybag, and garlic bulb are symbols of antisemitic ethnic stereotypes.

1415
A bull of the Antipope Benedict XIII orders the Jews to wear a yellow and red badge; the men on their breast, the women on their forehead.
1434
Emperor Sigismund reintroduces the badge at Augsburg.
1528
The Council of Ten of Venice allows the newly arrived famous physician and professor Jacob Mantino ben Samuel to wear the regular black doctors' cap instead of Jewish yellow hat for several months (subsequently made permanent), upon the recommendation of the French and English ambassadors, the papal legate, and other dignitaries numbered among his patients.
1555
Pope Paul IV decrees, in his Cum nimis absurdum, that the Jews should wear yellow hats.
1710
Frederick William I abolished the mandatory Jewish yellow patch in Prussia in return for a payment of 8,000 thaler (about $75,000 worth of silver at 2007 prices) each.

=== Axis powers ===
==== 1939 ====
Local German occupation commanders ordered Jewish Poles to wear an identifying mark under the threat of death. There were no consistent requirements as to its colour and shape: it varies from a white armband, a yellow hat to a yellow Star of David badge. Hans Frank ordered all Jewish Poles over the age of 11 years in German-occupied Poland to wear white armbands with a blue Star of David.

==== 1940 ====
A popular legend portrays king Christian X of Denmark wearing the yellow badge on his daily morning horseback ride through the streets of Copenhagen, followed by non-Jewish Danes responding to their king's example, thus preventing the Germans from identifying Jewish citizens. Queen Margrethe II of Denmark has explained that the story was not true. No order requiring Jews to wear identifying marks was ever introduced in Denmark.

==== 1941 ====
Jews in the Independent State of Croatia, a puppet state of Nazi Germany, were ordered to wear "Jewish insignia". Jewish Poles in German-occupied Soviet-annexed Poland, Jewish Lithuanians, Latvians and Estonians as well as Soviet Jews in German-occupied areas were obliged to wear white armbands or yellow badges. All Romanian Jews were ordered to wear the yellow badge. The yellow badge was the only standardised identifying mark in the German-occupied East; other signs were forbidden. Jewish Germans and Jews with citizenship of annexed states (Austrians, Czechs, Danzigers) from the age of six years were ordered to wear the yellow badge from 19 September when in public. In Luxembourg, the German occupation authorities introduce the Nuremberg Laws, followed by several other anti-Jewish ordinances including an order for all Jews to wear a yellow star with the word Jude. The Slovak Republic ordered its Jews to wear yellow badges.

==== 1941/1942 ====
Romania started to force Jews in newly annexed territories, denied Romanian citizenship, to wear the yellow badge.

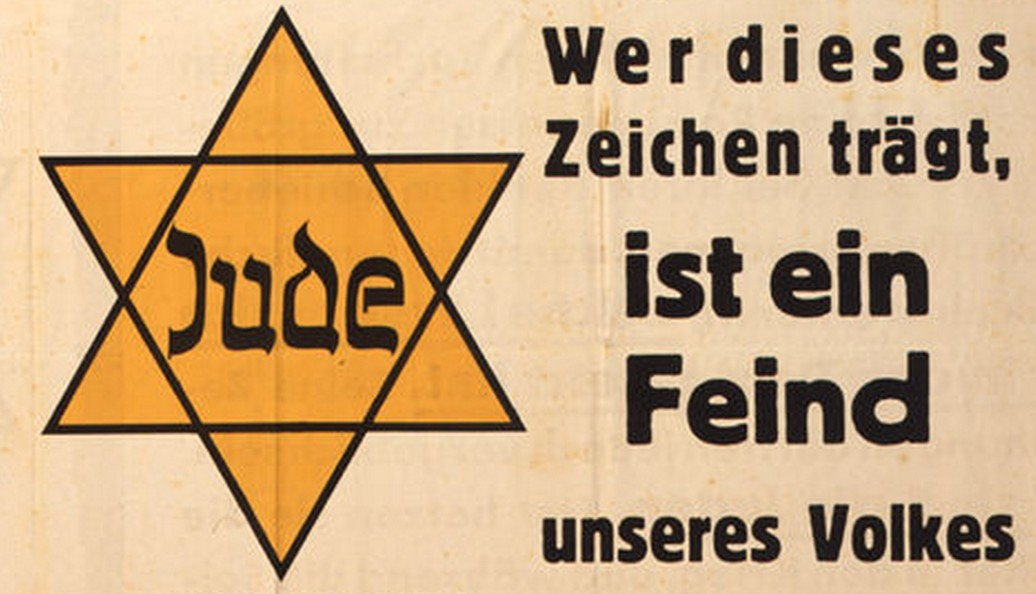
"Whoever wears this sign is an enemy of our people" – Parole der Woche, 1 July 1942

==== 1942 ====
The Gestapo ordered Jewish Germans and Jews with citizenship of annexed states to mark their apartments or houses at the front door with a white badge. Jewish Dutch people were ordered to wear the yellow badge. Jewish Belgians were ordered to wear the yellow badge. Jews in occupied France, covering the northern and western half of the country, were ordered to wear a yellow star by the German authorities. Bulgaria ordered its Jewish citizens to wear small yellow buttons. German forces invaded and occupied the zone libre, i.e. the south-eastern half of France, but did not enforce the yellow star directive there.

==== 1944 ====
After the occupation of Hungary, the Nazi occupiers ordered Jewish Hungarians and Jews with defunct other citizenships (Czechoslovak, Romanian, Yugoslav) in Hungarian-annexed areas to wear the yellow badge.

== See also ==
- Antisemitism in Christianity
- Antisemitism in Islam
- Cathar yellow cross
- History of antisemitism
- Jewish visibility
- Nazi concentration camp badge
- P (Nazi symbol)
