= 2026 Hatzola arson attack =

Multi-vehicle arson attack in London, England

- Date: 23 March 2026
- Time: c. 1:40 a.m. (GMT)
- Location: Highfield Road, Golders Green, North London, England
- Type: Arson
- Target: Four Hatzola ambulances
- Perpetrator: Harakat Ashab al-Yamin al-Islamia (claimed)
- Deaths: 0
- Injuries: 0

In the early hours of 23 March 2026, four Hatzola ambulances were set on fire in Golders Green, North London. There were no injuries, though damage caused by the attack was estimated at £1 million. Four men have been convicted of involvement in the crime. The Metropolitan Police has not confirmed or denied any motive or identity of groups behind the attack. The attack was part of a wave of attacks on Jewish targets in London.

== Incident ==
On 23 March 2026, at around 1:40am GMT, four Hatzola ambulances on Highfield Road, Golders Green, North London were set on fire. There were no injuries and the fire was put out at 3:06 am GMT. An accelerant had been poured on the ambulances parked on the property of Machzike Hadath, an Orthodox Jewish synagogue, and the vehicles were set ablaze by a group of three hooded arsonists, destroying three of the vehicles and seriously damaging a fourth. Windows were broken in a nearby apartment block due to explosions from oxygen cylinders within the ambulances. Six fire engines and 40 firefighters tackled the blaze.

The ambulances were part of a fleet consisting of five ambulances and an unknown number of fast response cars belonging to Hatzola Northwest Trust, a non-profit established in 1994 and run by Jewish volunteers that provide emergency medical treatment to area residents. The arson was estimated to have caused £1 million in damages.

== Investigation ==
The Islamic Movement of the People of the Right Hand (Harakat Ashab al-Yamin al-Islamiya), a group has which previously claimed involvement in attacks against Jewish sites throughout Europe, claimed responsibility for the London attack. SITE Intelligence Group has called the group an "Iran-aligned multinational militant collective". The Metropolitan Police indicated that they could not confirm the authenticity of the claim or verify that the arson was indeed a terrorist attack, but said that the incident was being investigated by Counter Terrorism Policing. On 25 March, The Wall Street Journal reported that investigators believe the Islamic Movement of the Righteous Companions is a fictitious organisation created by Iran to give it plausible deniability and confuse investigators.

On 25 March, two men aged 45 and 47, who are UK nationals, were arrested by the Metropolitan Police. Their homes in Kilburn and King's Cross were searched, along with two additional properties in North London. They were released on bail the next day. Early on 1 April, three more arrests were made at separate addresses: a 17-year-old British-Pakistani dual national, and 19- and 20-year-old British nationals. On 4 April at Westminster Magistrates' Court, a 19-year-old, Rehan Khan, a 20-year-old from Leyton, Hamza Iqbal and a 17-year-old boy from Walthamstow (later identified as Saif Ali) were charged with arson and remanded. A further suspect, an 18-year-old man Judex Atshatshi, was arrested at the court. A fifth individual, Subhan Ahmed, was charged in June with assisting an offender, as prosecutors alleged he had helped dispose of the car used by the attackers to prevent it from being traced.

On 28 August 2026, Khan, Iqbal, Ali and Atshatshi pleaded guilty at the Old Bailey to "destroying or damaging property being reckless whether life would be endangered". The judge, Bobbie Cheema-Grubb, ruled that they would not be sentenced until Ahmed's trial had concluded in 2027.

The Metropolitan Police later announced a wider crackdown on antisemitic hate crime across London, making more than 20 arrests. Police also increased patrols to protect sites connected to the local Jewish community.

== Reaction ==
The attack was condemned by British political leaders. The Prime Minister of the United Kingdom, Keir Starmer, said that the attack was "a horrific antisemitic attack" and that he had been in contact with Jewish community leaders. The Leader of the Opposition, Kemi Badenoch, said that "all of us need to make it clear in our words and actions that Britain will not tolerate antisemitism". The Mayor of London, Sadiq Khan, described the attack as "cowardly" and said that "Londoners will never be cowed by this kind of hatred and intimidation". The Secretary of State for Health and Social Care, Wes Streeting, said that the government will fund four replacement ambulances, and will loan National Health Service ambulances to the charity while replacements are sought.

Ephraim Mirvis, Chief Rabbi of the United Hebrew Congregations of the Commonwealth, called the attack a "particularly sickening assault" on an organisation "whose sole mission is to protect life, Jewish and non-Jewish alike". The Jewish Leadership Council said that it was "particularly sickening that someone's hatred of Jews drives them to target vital ambulance services".

The council chair of the British Medical Association, Tom Dolphin, said that attacks on healthcare services were "reprehensible" and antisemitism was "abhorrent".

Al Jazeera journalists reporting from the scene on 23 March were angrily confronted by a group of Jews, including a Met Police special constable, who demanded they leave and insulted them in Arabic.

In March 2026, Bharat Pankhania resigned as the mayor of Bath and from the Liberal Democrat group following backlash related to a post he reshared on social media, suggesting the Hatzola arson attack was an 'Israeli false flag operation'. He was the first Bath mayor to resign since 1937.

== See also ==
- 2026 London antisemitic attacks
