= Aaron, Son of the Devil =

1277 English antisemitic caricature

Aaryn, Son of the Devil
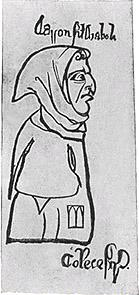

Aaron, Son of the Devil is the name given to an antisemitic caricature of an English Jew appearing on an Essex county document dated 1277. The document concerns fines imposed on some Jews and Christians who had pursued a doe after it had escaped from hounds chasing it near the city of Colchester, an offence against the forest laws of the time. One Jew, however, had supposedly evaded arrest and became the subject of the caricature.

The caricature is the earliest dated portrait of a Jew in England. He wears a yellow badge (with the Tablets of the Law) on his upper garments.
