= Machzike Hadath =

Jewish congregation in London

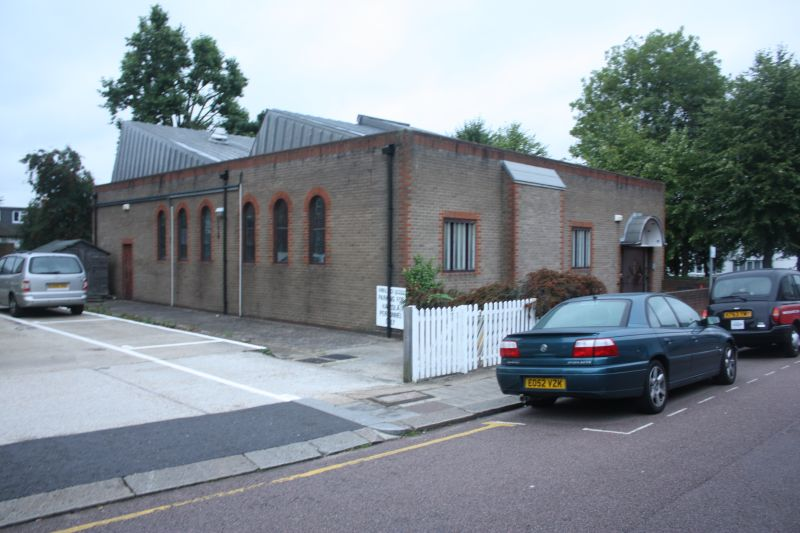
- The synagogue, in 2010

- Location of the synagogue in Greater London

Religion
- Affiliation: Orthodox Judaism
- Rite: Nusach Ashkenaz
- Ecclesiastical or organisational status: Synagogue
- Leadership: Rabbi Ilan Halberstadt
- Status: Active

Location
- Location: 1 Highfield Road, Golders Green, Borough of Barnet, London, England NW11 9LU
- Country: United Kingdom
- Coordinates: 51°34′46″N 0°12′28″W

Architecture
- Type: Protestant chapel
- Established: 1891 (as a congregation)
- Completed: 1898 (Brick Lane & Fournier St); 1983 (Highfield Road)

Website
- machzikehadath.com

The Machzike Hadath (lit. 'Upholders of Faith'), also known as the Spitalfields Great Synagogue, is an Orthodox Jewish congregation and synagogue, located on Highfield Road, Golders Green, in the Borough of Barnet, north-west London, England. The congregation was formed predominantly by Lithuanian Jews in 1891 and was initially located on Brick Lane. The congregation worships in the Ashkenazi rite.

== History ==
The congregation was founded in 1891 as Chevra Machzike Hadath (also spelled Chevrath Machzikei Hadath), a Hebrew name meaning "The Society of Upholders of the Faith". It was established by members of the North London Beth Hamedrash on Newington Green Road together with members of the Machzike Shomrei Shabbat Synagogue on Booth Street; the two groups later merged in 1983. The congregation's main purpose was to convince the Chief Rabbi and the wider community that serious breaches of the laws of kashrut were occurring.

In 1898 the congregation acquired premises in Spitalfields, at the corner of Fournier Street and Brick Lane, where they remained for 70 years. In 1905 the congregation affiliated with the Federation of Synagogues.

The Brick Lane, Spitalfields building, first established in 1743 as a Protestant chapel ("La Neuve Eglise") by London's French Huguenot community and later a Methodist chapel, was used by the congregation as a synagogue from 1898 to 1973, when it moved to Golders Green. The new synagogue was consecrated there in 1983. The former Brick Lane synagogue building is now the Brick Lane Mosque.

In the late 1920s the Machzike Hadath sponsored the publication of an edition of the Mishna Berura.

== Clergy ==
The following individuals have served as rabbi of the congregation:

Ordinal	Officeholder	Term started	Term ended	Time in office	Notes
1	Avraham Aba Werner	1891	1912	20–21 years	
2	Avraham Yitzchak HaKohen Kook	1912	1919	6–7 years	
3	Yechezkel Abramsky	1932	1935	2–3 years	
4	Simcha Lopian	1956	1983	26–27 years	
5	Dr. Ephraim Yehuda Wiesenberg	1983	1986	2–3 years	
6	Chaim Zundel Pearlman	1986	2018	31–32 years	Great grandson of Kamenitzer Maggid
7	Ilan Halberstadt	May 2018	incumbent	8 years, 178 days	

== See also ==
- History of the Jews in England
- List of Jewish communities in the United Kingdom
- List of synagogues in the United Kingdom
- Machzikei Hadas
