= Mohammad Baqer Saad Dawood al-Saadi =

Shia Iraqi militia group commander

- محمد باقر سعد داود السعدي
- Born: 1993 (age 32–33); Iran
- Organization: Kata'ib Hezbollah (alleged)
- Judicial status: Incarcerated
- Allegiance: Iran
- Criminal charges: Terrorism, Attempted murder

Details
- Imprisoned at: Metropolitan Detention Center, Brooklyn

Mohammad Baqer Saad Dawood al-Saadi (born 1993) is a commander of Kata'ib Hezbollah, a Shia Iraqi militia group backed by Iran's Islamic Revolutionary Guard Corps. After being arrested in Turkey in 2026, he was charged by the US for plotting or being involved in having a role in the 2026 London antisemitic attacks.

== Background ==
Al-Saadi was born in 1993 in Iran, to Iraqi Shia parents who left Iraq for exile in Iran during the Iran–Iraq War. His given name, Mohammad Baqer, is thought to be a reference to the martyr Grand Ayatollah Muhammad Baqir al-Sadr who was executed by Ba'athist Iraq in 1980.

One expert told The Guardian that al-Saadi had been recruited in his early 20s into a Shia militia created by the Iranian government after the US-led invasion of Iraq in 2003. Al-Saadi was deployed to Syria during the Syrian civil war when Shia militia forces were sent by Iran to bolster the regime of Bashar al-Assad. According to The Guardian, while in Syria he often exaggerated his combat experience.

== Arrest ==
On 15 May 2026, he was arrested in Turkey, extradited to New York City, and charged by the United States Justice Department for plotting or being involved in terrorist attacks in Europe and North America, including targeting a synagogue in New York City and other Jewish sites during the 2026 London antisemitic attacks, in retaliation to the 2026 Iran war. He was accused of involvement in the stabbing of two Jewish men in London, United Kingdom in April 2026. Additionally, the New York Post reported that he plotted to assassinate U.S. president Donald Trump's daughter Ivanka Trump in retaliation for the 2020 strike against former Quds Force commander Qasem Soleimani.

From within prison, he orchestrated an attempted attack on a U.S. base in Fairford, United Kingdom involving two men of Iranian and Iraqi nationality, which led to the announcement of eight new criminal charges against Al-Saadi.
