= Finchley Reform Synagogue =

Synagogue in Barnet, London

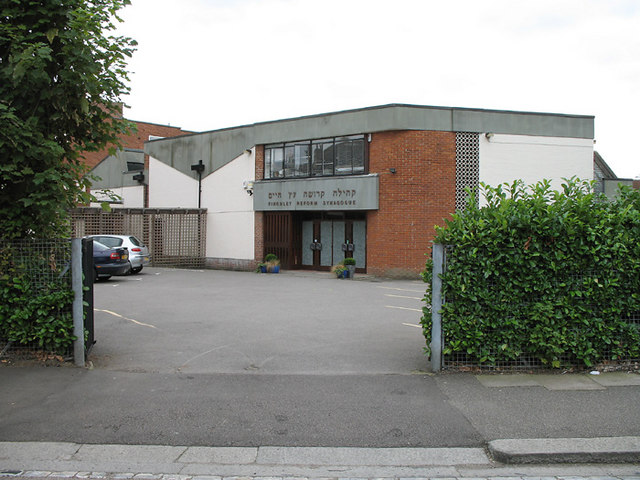
- The synagogue in 2006

- Location of the synagogue in Greater London

Religion
- Affiliation: Reform Judaism
- Ecclesiastical or organisational status: Synagogue
- Leadership: Cantor Zoe Jacobs, Rabbi Howard Cooper, Rabbi Deborah Blausten, Rabbi Jeffrey Newman
- Status: Active

Location
- Location: 101 Fallow Court Avenue, North Finchley, London, England N12 0BE
- Country: United Kingdom
- Coordinates: 51°36′28″N 0°10′52″W

Architecture
- Established: 1960 (as a congregation)
- Completed: 1961; 1974; and 2022
- Capacity: 220 worshippers

Website
- frs.org.uk

Finchley Reform Synagogue is a Reform Jewish congregation and synagogue, located at 101 Fallow Court Avenue, North Finchley, in the Borough of Barnet in London, England, in the United Kingdom.

The congregation is a member of the Movement for Progressive Judaism.

== Clergy ==
Its clergy are Rabbi Eleanor Davis, Cantor Zöe Jacobs, Rabbi Deborah Blausten, Rabbi Howard Cooper and emeritus Rabbi Jeffrey Newman.

== Overview ==
Finchley Reform Synagogue's new building completed in May 2022, replaced the previous 1974 structure, which itself had been built over the original 1961 synagogue. The new facility, costing approximately £4.7 million, addresses the needs of a growing community of around 2,000 members.

== Notable members ==
- John Bercow, former Speaker of the House of Commons
- Dame Melinda Simmons, former British diplomat, Ambassador of the United Kingdom in Ukraine

== See also ==
- List of Jewish communities in the United Kingdom
- List of synagogues in the United Kingdom
- Movement for Reform Judaism
