= Hatzalah =

Jewish volunteer emergency medical service

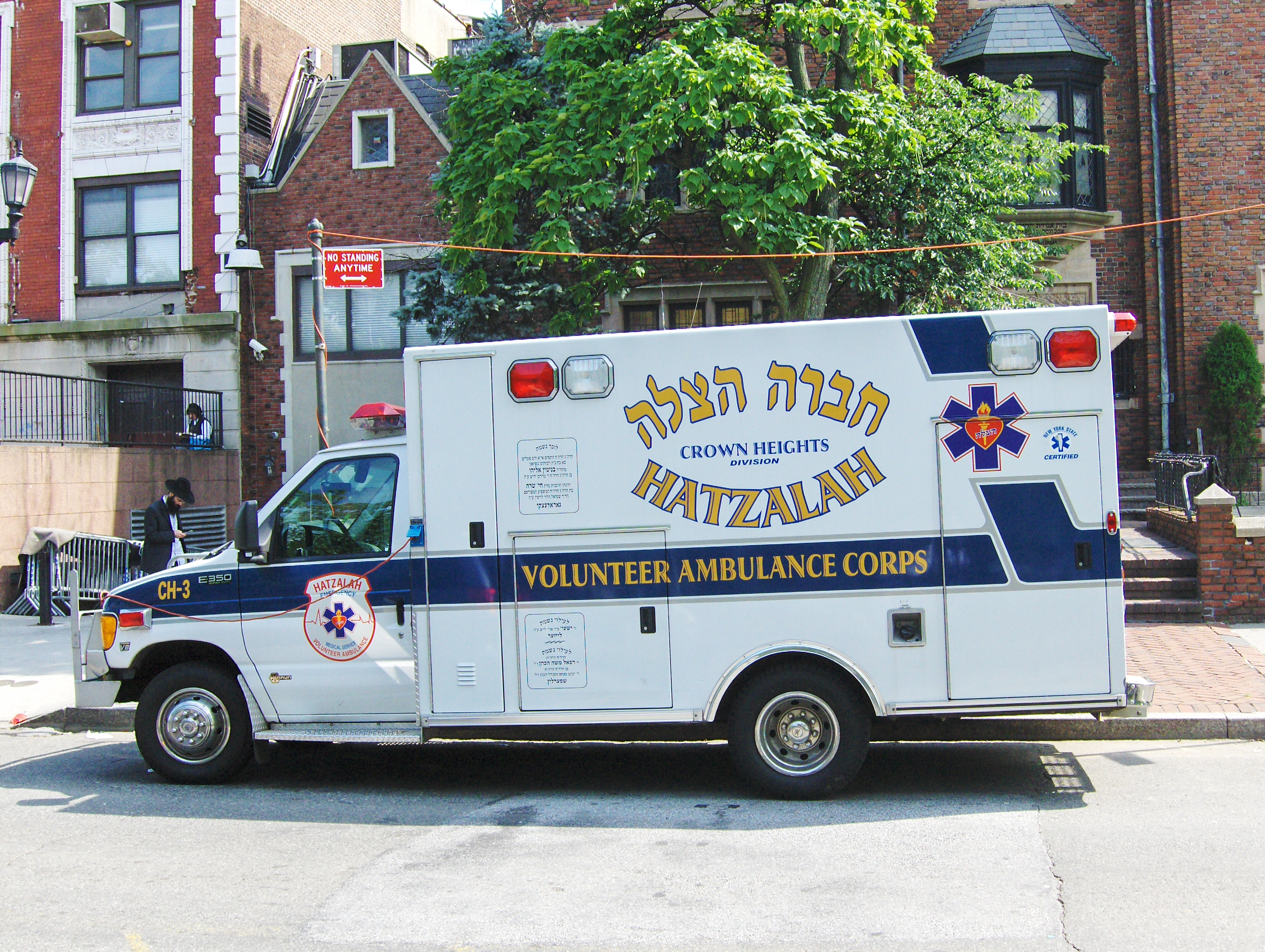
A Hatzalah ambulance in the Crown Heights neighborhood of Brooklyn in New York City

Hatzalah, also spelled Hatzolah or Hatzola (/hətˈsʌlə/; Hebrew: הַצָּלָה, lit. 'rescue' or 'relief', [hat͡saˈla]), is the title used by many Jewish volunteer emergency medical service (EMS) organizations serving mostly areas with Jewish communities around the world. Most local branches operate independently of each other, but use the common name.

== History ==
The original Hatzalah emergency medical services (EMS) was founded in Williamsburg, a neighborhood of Brooklyn, New York, by Hershel Weber in the late 1960s. His aim was to improve rapid emergency medical response in the community, and to mitigate cultural concerns of a Yiddish-speaking, Hasidic community. The idea spread to other Orthodox Jewish neighborhoods in the New York City area, and eventually to other regions, countries, and continents. Hatzalah is believed to be the largest volunteer ambulance service in the United States.

Hatzalah members were present at several operations such as the September 11 attacks and Surfside condominium collapse, and provided medical equipment to hospitals at the beginning of the COVID-19 pandemic. In March 2026, four Hatzola ambulances were set on fire in London in an apparent antisemitic hate crime.

== Operations ==
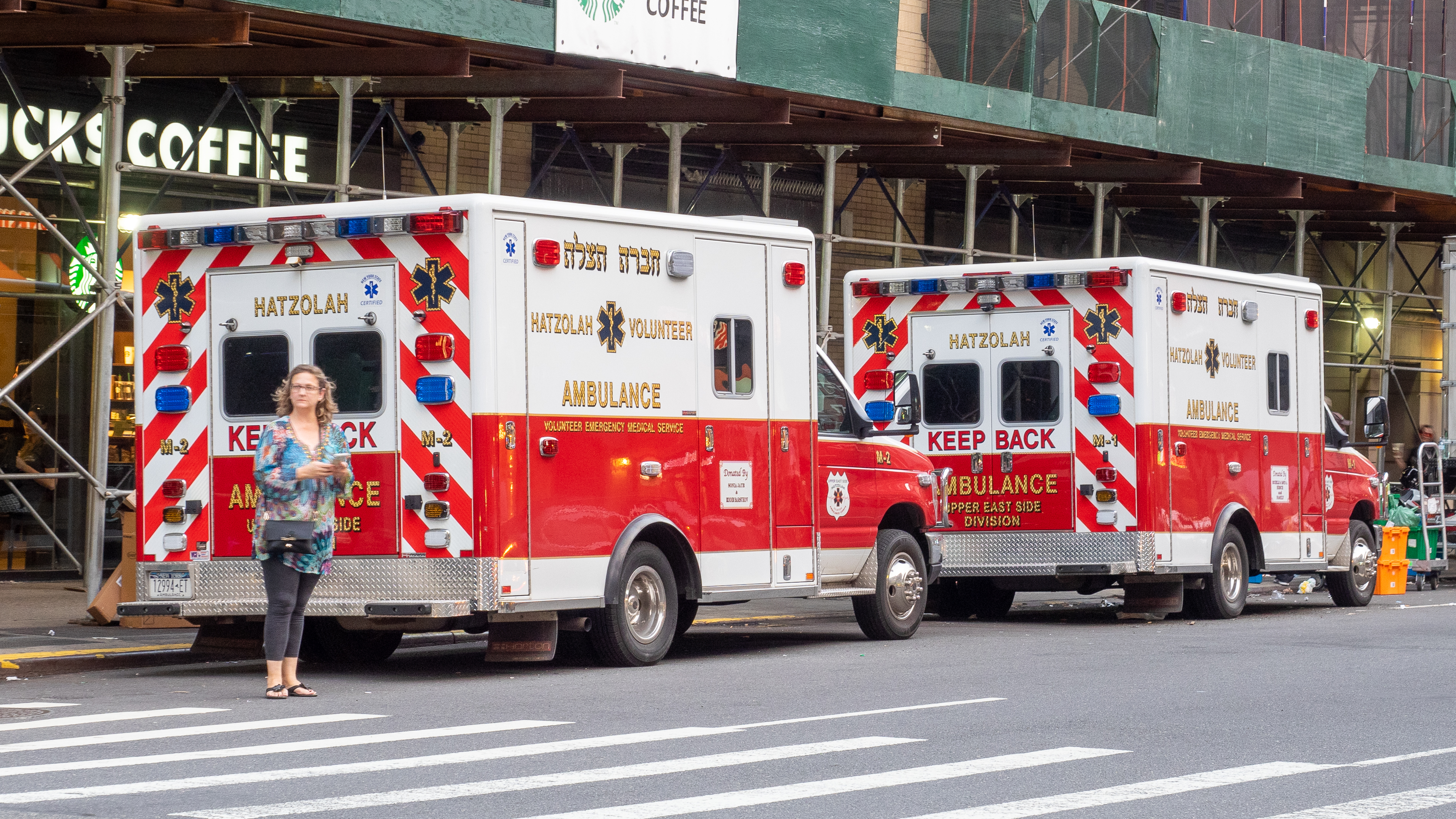
Two Hatzolah ambulances on stand-by on the Upper East Side

Each volunteer is called a unit (as in, a crew of one) and is assigned a unit number that starts with a neighborhood code, followed by a serial number for that neighborhood (e.g., "Q-120" means "Queens unit number 120").

In some areas there may be periods where coverage is not strong enough, for example on a summer weekend. When this happens, coordinators may assign an on-call rotation. The rotation may still respond from their houses, or they may stay at the garage through their shift. In such periods, Hatzalah functions closer to a typical EMS crew setup, though the dispatchers may still seek non-on-call members to respond, and there will still often be a non-ambulance responder as first dispatched, even if that responder starts from the base.

In Israel, United Hatzalah relies upon mobile phone technologies which include an SOS app and a special emergency phone number, 1221, with messages to news organizations distributed by WhatsApp.

=== Response times ===
Hatzalah's model provides for rapid first responder response times. Each Hatzalah neighborhood's response time varies. For example, in Borough Park, Brooklyn, daytime response in life-threatening emergency are between 1–2 minutes, and nighttime response times are 5–6 minutes. However, following implementation of Truck-1 (night on-call crews) the nighttime response in Borough Park was shortened significantly. In the Beverly-La Brea neighborhood of Los Angeles, response times average at 60–90 seconds. In Israel, the response time is under 3 minutes.

=== Organization ===
Hatzalah is not a single organization. Each chapter operates autonomously, or, in some cases, with varying levels of affiliation with neighboring Hatzalah chapters and under a central association.

In New York City, there are usually two or three members who are "coordinators", managing all operational aspects of the chapter. The New York City-area Hatzalah is formally called Chevra Hatzalah of New York. It combines dispatch and some other functions for over a dozen neighborhood chapters, which each have their own fund-raising, management, garages, ambulances, and assigned members. Together, the combined New York State branches have grown to become the largest all-volunteer ambulance system in the United States.

== Legal status ==
In New York, Hatzalah usually uses red and white lights and sirens, like normal unmarked emergency vehicles. In New Jersey, Hatzalah usually use blue lights. Since 2021, Florida law has permitted faith-based volunteer ambulance services to operate, allowing Hatzalah response vehicles to use emergency lights and sirens. In Toronto, Hatzalah uses green lights, having the same legal status as volunteer firefighters who also use green lights in their vehicles. In the United Kingdom, Hatzola organisations cannot legally use or install blue lights and sirens on their responders' private vehicles.

On 20 February 2013, the Federal Communications Commission granted Chevrah Hatzalah's request for a waiver to obtain calling party numbers (CPN), even when callers have caller ID blocking. In the United States, this type of CPN blocking waiver is normally only given to 911 call centers, but Chevrah Hatzalah does not receive calls through 911. Other Hatzalah dispatch numbers, including other New York State Hatzalah groups, do not have this waiver.

== Interaction with other agencies ==
=== Magen David Adom ===
United Hatzalah's relationship with Magen David Adom is strained, and MDA has banned its members and volunteers from also volunteering in other rescue organizations, including Hatzalah.

=== Ezras Nashim ===
Hatzalah was criticized by the New York Post and JEMS Magazine for its practice of not allowing women to join. A group of Orthodox women founded an organization called Ezras Nashim, an all-female Orthodox Jewish volunteer EMT ambulance service, citing the need for modesty and sensitivity to the needs of fellow Orthodox women, with the goal of preserving women's modesty in emergency medical situations, especially childbirth.

== See also ==
- List of Hatzalah chapters
- Shomrim
- Chaverim
- Chesed Shel Emes
- Misaskim
- ZAKA
