= Paulette Wilson =

British immigration activist (1956–2020)

- Born: 20 March 1956; Jamaica
- Died: 23 July 2020 (aged 64); Wolverhampton, England
- Occupation: British immigrant rights activist
- Known for: Bringing media attention to human rights violations of the Windrush scandal

Paulette Wilson (20 March 1956 – 23 July 2020) was a British immigrant rights activist who fought her own deportation to Jamaica and brought media attention to the human rights violations of the Windrush scandal.

== Biography ==
Wilson was born in the British Colony of Jamaica in 1956, and when she was 10 years old was sent by her mother to Britain. Raised by her grandparents, in Wellington, Telford, Wilson attended primary and secondary school in Britain. She worked as a cook, at one time in the House of Commons staff restaurant, raised a family, and paid British taxes for 34 years.

In 2015, Wilson received notification from the government that she was an illegal immigrant and was required to leave the UK. Her housing and health care benefits were stopped; she became homeless and was denied the right to seek work. By 2017, Wilson was facing deportation. She had not returned to Jamaica for 50 years but was arrested twice, detained in Yarl's Wood Detention Centre and then sent to the deportation centre at Heathrow Airport in October 2017. The Refugee and Migrant Centre of Wolverhampton persuaded her then-MP, Emma Reynolds, to stop the deportation at the last minute to allow Wilson more time to appeal to the Home Office.

Under the terms of the British Nationality Act 1948, Wilson and tens of thousands of migrants from the Caribbean and other British colonies had arrived in England as citizens of the British Empire. Children were admitted to the UK legally on their parents' passport, and no proof of their legal status was issued later. They were granted indefinite leave to remain in the UK in 1971, but changes made to immigration law in 2012 required proof of the right to live in the UK in order to work or obtain housing or access benefits including healthcare and housing benefits.

Media coverage of Wilson's situation and her fight with the Home Office to gain recognition of her legal status in the UK brought forward other victims and highlighted the 2012 policies implemented by Theresa May during her time as Home Secretary. The events became known as the Windrush scandal, which centred on the wrongful detention or deportation of approximately 164 people by the British government and the threatened deportation of many others.

Assisted by a caseworker from the Refugee and Migrant Centre, Wilson gathered documentation to prove that she had lived in England for 50 years and had been wrongly categorised by the Home Office. In 2018, she was officially granted leave to remain. Having settled her own case, Wilson campaigned for the rights of other immigrants facing similar situations. In 2019, a documentary produced by Shanida Scotland for The Guardian included Wilson's story, along with those of other victims of the Windrush scandal. In June 2020, Wilson, along with other activists, delivered to Downing Street a petition containing 130,000 signatures calling on the government to resolve the outstanding issues and compensate victims of the scandal.

Wilson died on 23 July 2020 in Wolverhampton, West Midlands, where she had settled in Heath Town. Her decision to go public with the issues she was facing with the Home Office was pivotal in the exposure of the Home Office failings in its implementation of the hostile environment policy.

Wilson's funeral was delayed while relatives unsuccessfully sought leave to themselves fill her grave in line with Jamaican custom, involving her brother writing to the Prime Minister Boris Johnson; the request was turned down as disallowed by COVID-19 restrictions. The funeral was eventually held on 4 September 2020 at New Testament Church, Wednesfield Road, Wolverhampton, followed by interment in Danescourt Cemetery nearby.

In 2021, a plaque was installed in her memory at the Wolverhampton Heritage Centre. The plaque was the result of a campaign led by Patrick Vernon and Claire Darke MBE as well as Wilson's family and the centre, which is a cornerstone of the local Caribbean community and was formerly the constituency office of Enoch Powell, where the infamous "Rivers of Blood" speech was written.

== See also ==
- Windrush generation – the common name for migrants who moved to Britain from the Caribbean in the years after World War II.
- Sitting in Limbo, BBC dramatisation of the story of Anthony Bryan who was caught up in the Home Office hostile environment policy.
- Dexter Bristol, who became destitute after losing his job as a result of the hostile environment policy and who died shortly thereafter.
