= Docs not Cops =

British campaign group opposing migrants' healthcare charges

Docs not Cops is a political organisation in the United Kingdom, set up to challenge the application of the Home Office hostile environment policy in the National Health Service that began in 2014.

The organisation opposes upfront charges for health care which, they claim, deter sick people in fragile, vulnerable circumstances from seeking medical treatment.

In October 2017 they set up an immigration checkpoint outside the Department of Health as a protest against the extension of charging rules.

In May 2018 the government agreed to amend the data sharing arrangements between the Home Office and the NHS which had been one of the organisation's protest targets after concerns raised by the House of Commons Health and Social Care Committee. This happened shortly after the Windrush scandal.

Shortly afterwards a pilot scheme in London hospitals which asked 8,894 people for two forms of identity prior to treatment showed that only 50 of them were not entitled to free NHS treatment. Dr Jessica Potter, of the organisation, said: "People who are most likely to be charged are the least able to pay. There is no evidence it saves the NHS an appreciable amount of money."
