= "Go Home" vans =

Controversial UK government policy

The "Go Home" vans were part of a controversial 2013 advertising campaign by the British Home Office during Theresa May's tenure as Home Secretary in which advertising vans with slogans recommending that illegal immigrants should "GO HOME OR FACE ARREST" were sent to tour areas with high immigrant populations. The hypothesis of the operation was that people who did not have leave to remain would voluntarily depart if "a near and present" danger, such as being arrested, was made apparent. The pilot programme, which had the internal codename 'Operation Vaken', ran in the six London boroughs of Barking and Dagenham, Barnet, Brent, Ealing, Hounslow, and Redbridge from 22 July to 22 August 2013, and was part of the Home Office hostile environment policy. In October 2013, the evaluation report stated that 60 voluntary departures were believed to be directly related to 'Operation Vaken' and 65 more cases were "currently being progressed to departure."

The posters on the vans depicted a person with a Home Office badge holding out a pair of handcuffs, under the message:

In the UK illegally? Go home or face arrest. Text HOME to 78070 for free advice, and help with travel documents. We can help you to return home voluntarily without fear of arrest or detention.

The campaign was cancelled after a public outcry against it.

An August 2013 Yougov poll found that 55% of British adults supported the scheme and 35% opposed it.

British politicians including Nick Clegg, Vince Cable and Eric Pickles expressed concerns about the campaign. Nigel Farage described the tone of the advertisements, which he saw as an attempt by the government to be seen to be "doing something" to appeal to UKIP voters, as "unpleasant". Yvette Cooper compared the slogans on the vans with slogans used by the National Front in the 1970s and the campaign was described by Diane Abbott as an example of dog-whistle politics, stating that "It is not so much dog-whistle politics as an entire brass band ... It is akin to scrawling 'Paki go home' on the side of buildings. I don't believe this policy is going to achieve anything besides stoking fear and resentment."

When questioned about the vans on The Rest is Politics in 2024 by Alastair Campbell, Theresa May who had held the ministerial responsibility, responded that "The vans were wrong. We should not have done the vans."

== See also ==
- Illegal immigration to the United Kingdom
- Racism in the UK Conservative Party
