= Illegal immigration to the United Kingdom =

Unauthorised entry or residence in the United Kingdom

Illegal immigration to the United Kingdom refers to the unauthorised entry, residence, or employment of foreign nationals in contravention of British laws and border protocols.

Pew Research Center, an American think tank, estimated in 2019 that in 2017 there were between 800,000 and 1,200,000 illegal immigrants in the UK, before the English Channel illegal immigrant crossings that proliferated from 2018 onwards. Pew Research Center later released a new estimate of between 700,000 and 900,000 illegal immigrants in the UK in 2017. This figure includes asylum seekers arriving in the UK illegally, who have a legal right to be resident in the UK until their case is decided. Between 2018 and 2025, over 190,000 illegal immigrants reached the UK via small boat Channel crossings. Again, these people usually claim asylum upon arrival and so are resident in the country legally.

Illegal immigrants enter the UK through a variety of clandestine and exploitative routes, by crossing the English Channel in small boats, stowing away in the back of heavy goods vehicles (HGVs) or on international trains or by utilising counterfeit or stolen identity documents to bypass airport security, or by legally arriving on short-term visas and subsequently overstaying their leave to remain.

The numbers of people who are illegally resident in the UK (undocumented migrants), as opposed to having arrived illegally but then claimed asylum, are difficult to establish, as by definition the government is not aware of their identities and locations.

== Definitions ==
According to the House of Commons Library, several definitions for a migrant exist in United Kingdom so that a migrant can be:

- Someone whose country of birth is different to their country of residence.
- Someone whose nationality is different to their country of residence.
- Someone who changes their country of usual residence for a period of at least a year, so that the country of destination effectively becomes the country of usual residence.

Illegal immigrants in the UK include those who have:

- entered the UK without authority
- entered with false documents
- overstayed their visas
- entered into fraudulent marriage

Those entering the UK illegally often claim asylum upon arrival, stating they are in danger in their country of origin. Those who do this are not illegally resident in the UK, whereas those entering through official channels with false documents, or who have overstayed their visas, are resident in the country illegally. This group is sometimes known as "undocumented migrants". According to the Joint Council for the Welfare of Immigrants, the vast majority of people who are resident in Britain without legal documentation arrived legally.

Of those claiming asylum in the UK, the Home Office finds that the majority have well-founded fears of persecution in their home country (39% of claims were accepted first time in 2025, with 66% of appeals successful). These individuals are granted refugee status.

== History ==
In February 2008, the government introduced new £10,000 fines for employers found to be employing illegal immigrants where there is negligence on the part of the employer, with unlimited fines or jail sentences for employers acting knowingly.

Organised efforts of illegal immigrants attempting to clandestinely enter the UK from Calais date back to at least the late 1990s, primarily by concealing themselves within freight lorries or cross-border trains before the illegal small boat channel crossings proliferated from 2018 onwards. The situation at Calais escalated significantly in 2015 with the establishment of a large-scale informal camp, the Calais Jungle.

In 2015, the newly-elected Conservative government announced it would be requiring landlords to confirm the immigration status of tenants. Those failing to do so, or knowingly or unknowingly housing illegal immigrants could face criminal prosecution. This policy is called "Right to Rent", part of the Home Office hostile environment policy.

The UK has long suffered from widespread student visa abuse; in 2024, 16,000 foreign students, after entering the UK on student visas, applied for asylum. "We've seen visa abuse in the case of legal routes, where people have gone legally and then sought to overstay when their visas weren't extended", said the UK's Indo-Pacific Minister in November 2025.

== Research ==
It is difficult to measure how many people reside in the UK without authorisation, although a Home Office study based on Census 2001 data released in March 2005 estimated a population of between 310,000 and 570,000. The methods used to arrive at a figure are also much debated. Problems arise in particular from the very nature of the target population, which is hidden and mostly wants to remain so. The different definitions of 'illegality' adopted in the studies also pose a significant challenge to the comparability of the data. However, despite the methodological difficulties of estimating the number of people living in the UK without authorisation, the residual method has been widely adopted. This method subtracts the known number of authorised migrants from the total migrant population to arrive at a residual number which represents the de facto number of illegal migrants.

Migration Watch UK, a think tank and campaign group opposed to a large scale of immigration, has criticised the Home Office figures for not including the UK-born dependent children of illegal migrants. They suggested in 2007 that the Home Office had underestimated the numbers of illegal migrants by between 15,000 and 85,000.

A study carried out by a research team at LSE for the Greater London Authority, published in 2009, estimated the illegal migrant population of the UK by updating the Home Office study. The LSE's study takes into account other factors not included in the previous estimate, namely the continued arrival of asylum seekers, the clearance of the asylum applications backlog, further illegal migrants entering and leaving the country, more migrants overstaying, and the regularisation of EU accession citizens.

The most significant change in this estimate is, however, the inclusion of children born in the UK to illegal immigrants. For the LSE team illegal migrants oscillate between 417,000 and 863,000, including a population of UK-born children ranging between 44,000 and 144,000. Drawing on this and taking stock of the outcome of the recent Case Resolution Programme, a University of Oxford study by Nando Sigona and Vanessa Hughes estimated at the end of 2011 a population of illegal migrant children of 120,000, with over half born in the UK to parents residing without legal immigration status. A Greater London Authority-funded study by researchers at the University of Wolverhampton's Institute for Community Research and Development updated these figures in 2020, and estimated that the figure in April 2017 was between 594,000 and 745,000 including between 191,000 and 241,000 children. A January 2025 study commissioned by Thames Water to identify "hidden" and "transient" users of water, suggested that London is home to as many as 585,000 illegal migrants, the equivalent to one in twelve of the city's population.

== Channel illegal immigrants ==
The illegal small boat crossings were first reported on in 2015 when a sporadic number of small boats arrived off the Kent coast from France.

In November and December 2018, there was a surge in illegal immigrant channel crossings. On 28 December 2018, the UK Home Secretary declared a "major incident" regarding illegal immigrants attempting to cross the channel.

The largest number of illegal immigrants to illegally enter the UK by crossing the English Channel on a single day in 2025 was 1,195 on 19 different boats on 31 May 2025.

As of 2 February 2026, the Home Office has detected 193,599 migrants who have crossed the English Channel in small boats since 2018. Crossing the Channel without permission is a criminal offence under UK law, as is to attempt to use a dangerous type of vessel or any unregistered craft under French law.

=== Deaths ===
Deaths have been reported in every year since the crossings began increasing in 2018.

In October 2019 in a single incident, 39 migrants from Vietnam suffocated together in a lorry trailer travelling from Belgium to Essex. The Vietnamese leader of the smuggling gang was jailed in Belgium while a Romanian smuggler of the ring was sentenced at the Old Bailey.

A report in 2020 found that almost 300 people had died crossing the English Channel on small boats in the twenty years prior. In November 2021 when 28 people drowned during one crossing attempt. 2024 saw a significant increase in channel crossing deaths, with 61 dead by the end of the year.

== See also ==
- "Go Home" vans
- Deportation
- Modern immigration to the United Kingdom
- Historical immigration to Great Britain
- Foreign-born population of the United Kingdom
- Demographics of the United Kingdom
- 2015 European migrant crisis
- Calais Jungle
- MigrationWatch UK
