= Home Office hostile environment policy =

UK government policy on immigration from October 2010

The UK Home Office hostile environment policy is a set of administrative and legislative measures designed to make staying in the United Kingdom as difficult as possible for people without leave to remain, in the hope that they may "voluntarily leave". The Home Office policy was first announced in 2012 under the Conservative–Liberal Democrat coalition. The policy was widely seen as being part of a strategy of reducing UK immigration figures to the levels promised in the 2010 Conservative Party Election Manifesto.

The policy has been cited as one of the harshest immigration policies in the history of the United Kingdom. It has been criticised as inhumane, ineffective, and unlawful. The United Nations Human Rights Council has stated that the policy has fostered xenophobia within the UK, while the Equality and Human Rights Commission has found that the policy broke equalities law.

It has notably led to significant issues with the Windrush generation and other Commonwealth citizens being deported after not being able to prove their right to remain in the UK, despite being guaranteed that right. The resulting Windrush scandal led to the resignation of Amber Rudd as Home Secretary, on 29 April 2018, and the appointment of Sajid Javid as her successor.

== Origin of the term ==
In 2012, Theresa May, who was the Conservative Home Secretary at the time, introduced the Hostile Environment Policy saying that: "The aim is to create, here in Britain, a really hostile environment for illegal immigrants". In May 2007, Liam Byrne, who was the Labour immigration minister at the time, had referred to a "hostile environment" in an announcement of a consultation document: "We are trying to create a much more hostile environment in this country if you are here illegally".

== Policy ==
In October 2013, May stated, "we will extend the number of non-suspensive appeals so that, where there is no risk of serious and irreversible harm, we can deport first and hear appeals later". As from August 2025, 'deport first' policies have been extended to apply to nationals from a total of 23 countries.

The policy included the removal of homeless citizens of other European Union countries. Additionally, through the implementation of the Immigration Act 2014 and Immigration Act 2016, the policy included requirements for landlords, the NHS, charities, community interest companies and banks to carry out ID checks.

The policy also implemented a more complicated application process to get 'leave to remain' based on the principle of 'deport first, appeal later', whilst encouraging voluntary deportation though strategies including "Go Home" vans as part of "Operation Vaken", as well as adverts in newspapers, shops, and charity and faith buildings used by ethnic minorities.

In 2018, the Home Office lost 75% of their appeals against applicants for refugee status who challenged rejections by the Home Office. Sonya Sceats, the chief executive of Freedom from Torture, said:

Long drawn-out legal processes are traumatic for anyone, let alone those who have fled persecution. Having an impartial judge accept that you are at risk of torture or death if you are forced back, only to have this challenged all over again by the Home Office before yet another appeal panel, can have devastating consequences ... important questions must be asked about the necessity for, and humanity of, these appeals.

A 2018 governmental review revealed that the Home Office had tried to deport at least 300 highly skilled migrants (including teachers, doctors, lawyers, engineers and IT professionals) under the 322(5) provision, at least 87 successfully. This mostly affected people who had lived in the UK for more than 10 years and had children born in the UK. Many were given only 14 days to leave the UK and were made ineligible to apply for visas to return. The review found that 65% of 322(5) decisions were overturned by an upper tribunal and 45% of applicants for judicial review were successful (28% of judicial reviews found in favour of the defendant). Additionally, the review found that 32% of "complex cases" were wrongly decided.

== Criticism ==
The policy has been criticised for being unclear, has led to many incorrect threats of deportation and has been called "Byzantine" by the England and Wales Court of Appeal for its complexity.

The immigration lawyer and campaigner Colin Yeo described the effect of the policy as: "the creation of an illegal underclass of foreign, mainly ethnic minority workers and families who are highly vulnerable to exploitation and who have no access to the social and welfare safety net."

In February 2018, Members of Parliament called for a review of the policy.

In December 2018, it emerged that enforcement of the "hostile environment" policy in one part of the UK government – the Home Office – was dooming to failure initiatives championed and funded by other parts of the UK government.

A September 2020 report on the Hostile Environment by the Institute for Public Policy Research found that the policy had "contributed to forcing many people into destitution, has helped to foster racism and discrimination, and has erroneously affected people with the legal right to live and work in the UK."

A Equality and Human Rights Commission report released in November 2020 found that the Home Office had broken its public sector equality duty with the Hostile Environment policy and that the Office, including its senior leadership, routinely ignored the negative consequences of the policy.

=== Police ===
Out of the 45 UK territorial police forces, over half acknowledged handing over the details of migrant victims and witnesses of crimes to the Home Office for immigration enforcement, while only 3 denied doing so.

Several cases of victims of serious crimes, including rape, being arrested upon reporting the crime have been uncovered. Step Up Migrant Women Campaign, a coalition of dozens of organisations working with migrant victims of domestic abuse, was formed in response to this trend.

Amid criticisms, the National Police Chiefs' Council issued a guidance in December 2018 which declares that "the fundamental principle must be for the police to first and foremost treat [the person reporting a crime] as a victim" and advises against systematic checking of victims' immigration status for the purpose of sharing that information with immigration enforcement. In addition, while the guidance states that, upon discovering irregular immigration status, "it is wholly appropriate that the officer in the case should contact immigration enforcement at the appropriate juncture", it does posit that no enforcement action beyond information-sharing should be taken by police outside of safeguarding concerns.

The practice is thought to lead to the under-reporting of crime against undocumented people in the UK due to a fear of arrest and deportation of the victims. Deeming the NPCC's guidance insufficient to provide protection to victims, various charities called for the implementation of a firewall, a complete ban on information-sharing, between police and immigration officials. In December 2018, a super-complaint against the police forces of England and Wales was lodged in response to the systemic information-sharing and its perverse consequences.

Immigration officials have been accused of using coercive tactics to enter and search homes and businesses without warrants under the policy, disproportionately targeting people from minority ethnic backgrounds.

=== Housing ===
Charities, campaigners, and landlords have criticised the hostile environment within the Right to Rent scheme, saying it is 'unlawful and discriminates against tenants on the basis of their race or nationality', and that it contributes to homelessness.

In January 2019, it emerged that tight restrictions on the right to rent (i.e. the right to become a tenant), under the "hostile environment" policy, had caused homelessness for some British citizens living in Britain.

In 2020, the Home Office used the Penally Training Camp barracks to house asylum seekers. The conditions in the camp were described as inadequate with some of the asylum seekers protesting that their human rights were being ignored and comparing the camp to a prison. The Welsh Government issued a statement: "The camp does not meet the basic human needs of people seeking a new life in the UK" and called for its use to end as quickly as possible.

=== NHS ===
Medical professionals have criticised the hostile environment policy, which charges migrants for NHS treatment at 150% of usual rates thus putting at risk people's health as it leads to individuals avoiding visiting doctors due to fears of having their details passed on to the Home Office, and concerns they will be unable to afford the medical bills. This has included refusal to perform a heart transplant and end-of-life care for a 38-year-old man. Even within its own regulations, the hostile environment has led to people being wrongly denied urgent healthcare, including cancer treatment. Research at the University of Manchester showed that the policy made health services difficult to navigate and negotiate. In October 2017 Docs not Cops set up an immigration checkpoint outside the Department of Health as a protest against the extension of charging rules. In April 2019, several UK medical professional organisations accused ministers of a cover-up for refusing to release three official reports commissioned by the Department of Health and Social Care (DHSC) in 2017 into its decision to force NHS trusts in England to implement up-front charging for services. In 2021, a 29 year-old asylum seeker in the UK was given a £100,000 hospital bill after suffering a stroke which left him in a coma and paralysed. He had stopped taking anti-stroke medication due to having been previously charged £6,000 for the treatment.

The policy has been accused of worsening the COVID-19 pandemic in the United Kingdom, as a result of hampering contact tracing and mass testing efforts. The policy has also been criticised for contributing to a shortage of critical healthcare staff during the pandemic.

=== Deaths in custody ===
Since the inception of the hostile environment policy, a number of detainees have died in immigration removal centres, including at least five at Morton Hall.

=== Deportation of people at risk of murder or torture ===
The Home Office has been strongly criticised for its deportation, under the hostile environment policy, of people to countries where they are known to be at particular risk of being tortured or killed, such as Afghanistan and Zimbabwe. This practice is prohibited by Article 3 of the European Convention on Human Rights, which forms part of UK law as part of the Human Rights Act 1998. In 2017, the Home Office under Amber Rudd deported a refugee back to Afghanistan in spite of a High Court order not to, was found in contempt of court and on review was ordered to return him. Kenneth Baker was found in contempt of court when his Home Office did the same thing in 1991. Another person was killed in Afghanistan following deportation from the UK.

=== Mistreatment of trafficking victims ===
In 2018, it emerged that under the "hostile environment" policy, victims of modern slavery and human trafficking in the U.K. had been jailed in breach of the Modern Slavery Act 2015, and that several had been deported by the Home Office.

In November 2018, the Home Office reduced financial support for victims of modern slavery, but was subsequently ordered by the High Court to reverse the cut. Approximately 1,200 victims were affected.

=== Government evaluations ===
In February 2023, the Conservative government published an assessment of the hostile environment policy's impact between 2014 and 2018. The report concluded that the five nationalities most impacted by the policy were of brown or black heritage and all five were visibly not white, while other nationalities such as Albanian and Brazilian people, despite being among the groups most commonly found to be illegally present in the UK, were less frequently affected by the measures. A December 2018 investigation by the National Audit Office found that the policy had not been implemented with sufficient care and did not provide value for money and a 2020 Institute for Public Policy Research report found that the hostile environment policy had fostered racism, pushed people into destitution, wrongly targeted people who were living in the UK legally, and had "severely harmed the reputation of the Home Office".

== Windrush scandal ==
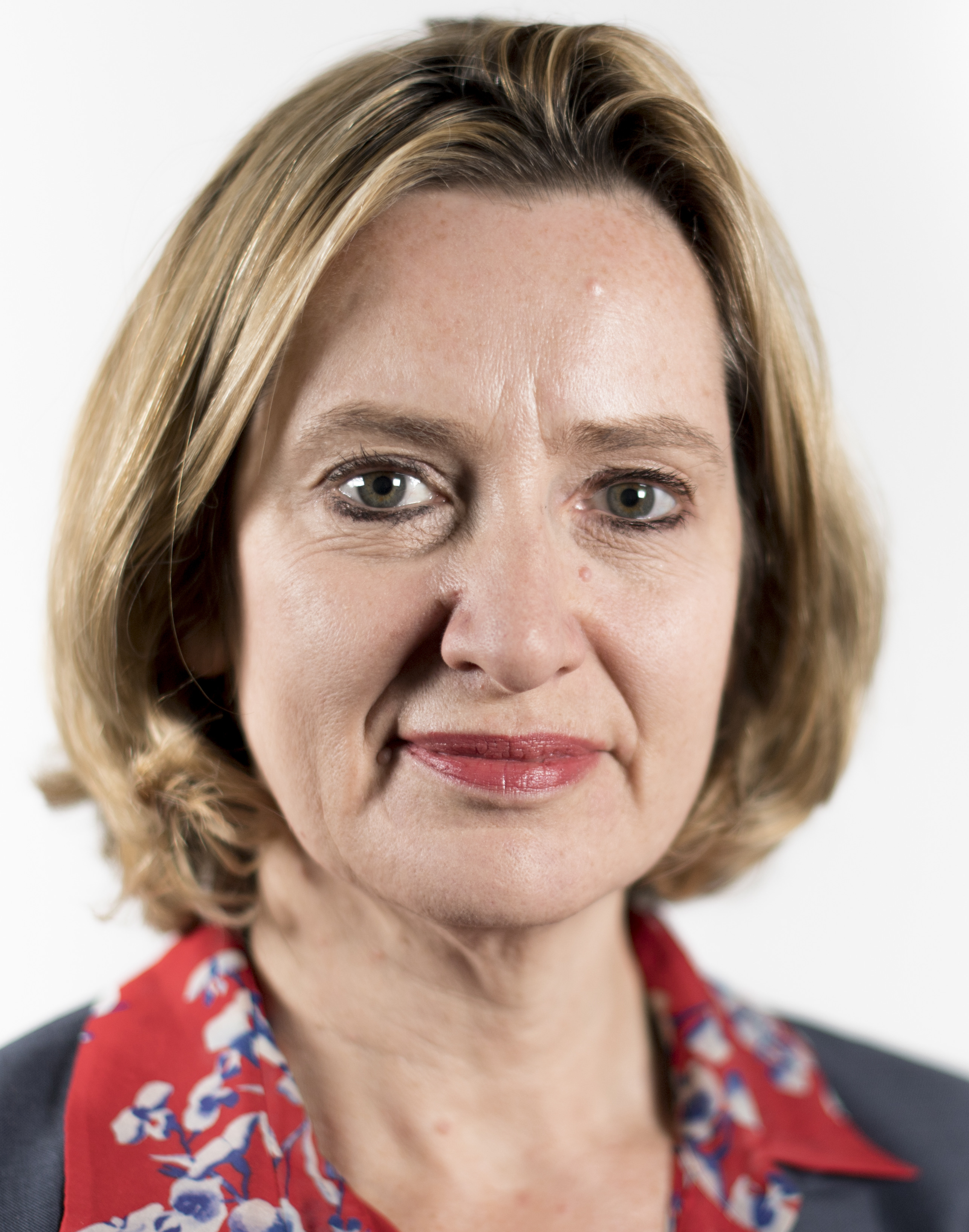
Amber Rudd

The policy led to issues with the Windrush generation and other Commonwealth citizens not being able to prove their right to remain in the UK. The resulting Windrush scandal led to the resignation of Amber Rudd as Home Secretary, on 29 April 2018, and the appointment of Sajid Javid as her successor.

In comments seen by the press as distancing himself from his predecessor as Home Secretary, Theresa May, Javid told Parliament that "I don't like the phrase hostile. So the terminology I think is incorrect and I think it is a phrase that is unhelpful and it doesn't represent our values as a country", preferring the term "compliant environment" instead. However, former officials from the Home Office have said that "She's (Theresa May) wedded to the hostile environment albeit with a different name. It's going to be difficult for any home secretary to put their own stamp on things." Javid "stopped short of rowing back from the meat of the hostile environment policy, insisting that tackling illegal immigration is vital".

On 19 March 2020, the Home Office released the Windrush Lessons Learned Review. This report resulted from an independent inquiry into the Windrush scandal, managed and conducted by Wendy Williams, an inspector of constabulary. The report was a scathing indictment of the Home Office's handling of Windrush individuals, and concluded that the Home Office showed an inexcusable "ignorance and thoughtlessness", and that what had happened had been "foreseeable and avoidable". It further found that immigration regulations were tightened "with complete disregard for the Windrush generation", and that officials had made irrational demands for multiple documents to establish residency rights. The report recommended a full review of the "hostile environment" immigration policy.

On 25 November 2020, a report from the Equality and Human Rights Commission said that the Home Office broke the law by failing to obey public-sector equality duties (a legal requirement under the Equality Act 2010) by not considering how its policies affected black members of the Windrush generation.

== Media coverage ==
In June 2020, BBC Television screened an 85-minute, one-off drama, Sitting in Limbo, starring Patrick Robinson as Anthony Bryan, who was caught up in the effects of the policy.

== See also ==
- Immigration Act 2014
- Illegal immigration to the United Kingdom
- History of UK immigration control
- Theresa May as Home Secretary
- Dexter Bristol
- Racism in the British Conservative Party
- Rwanda asylum plan
