= Theresa May as Home Secretary =

Theresa May
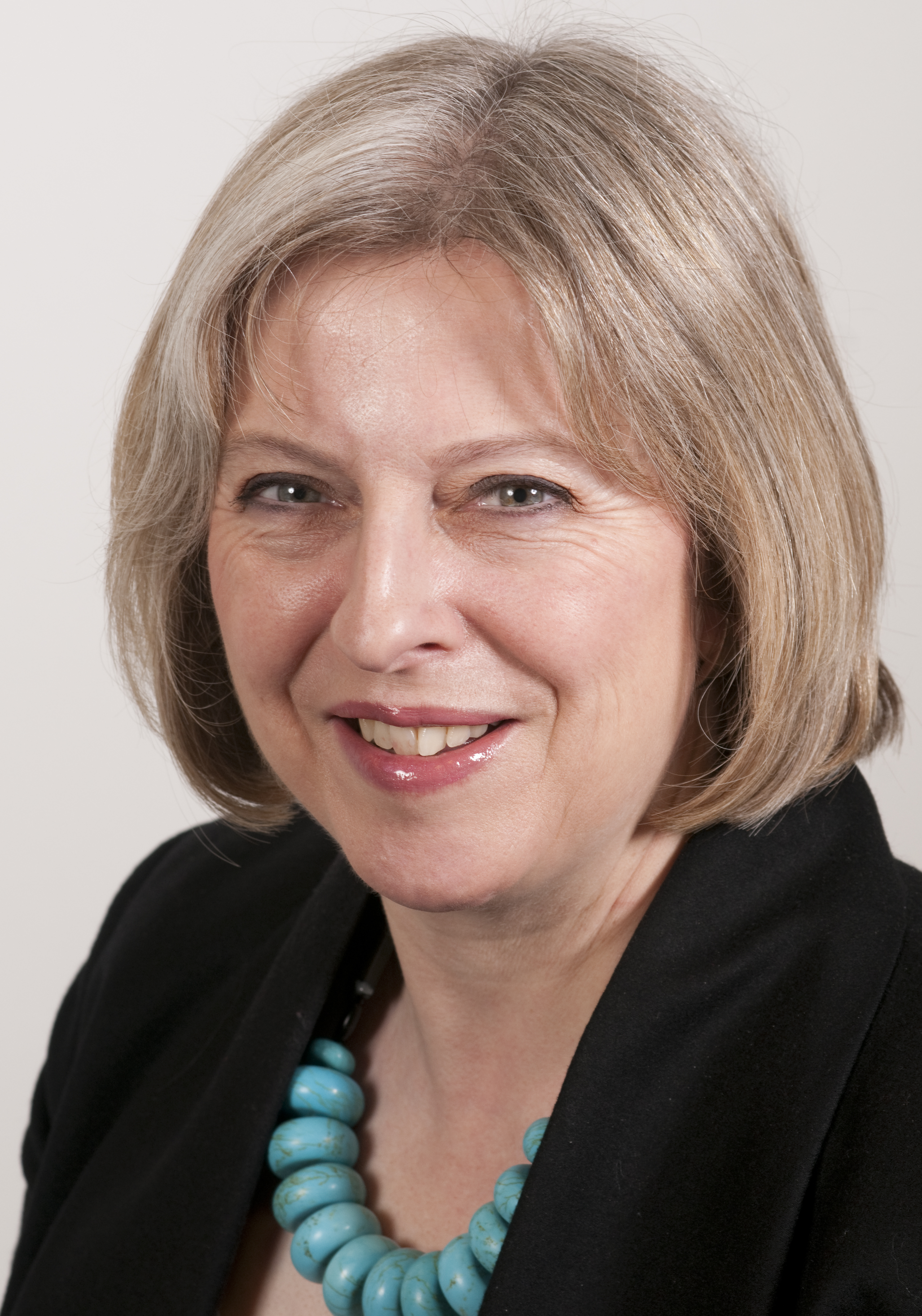

Home Secretary
- In office 12 May 2010 – 13 July 2016
- Prime Minister: David Cameron
- Preceded by: Alan Johnson
- Succeeded by: Amber Rudd

Theresa May served as home secretary from 2010 until 2016. As a member of David Cameron's first government May was appointed as home secretary on 12 May 2010, shortly after Cameron became prime minister, and continued in the post as part of the second Cameron government following the 2015 general election. She held the post until she succeeded Cameron as prime minister on 13 July 2016. May was the second woman to be appointed as home secretary (after Jacqui Smith), and the fourth woman to hold one of the Great Offices of State.

The longest-serving home secretary since James Chuter Ede over 60 years previously, May pursued reform of the Police Federation, implemented a harder line on drugs policy including banning khat and brought in further restrictions on immigration. She oversaw the introduction of elected police and crime commissioners, police investigations including Operation Yewtree, the deportation of Abu Qatada and the creation of the College of Policing and the National Crime Agency.

== Appointment ==
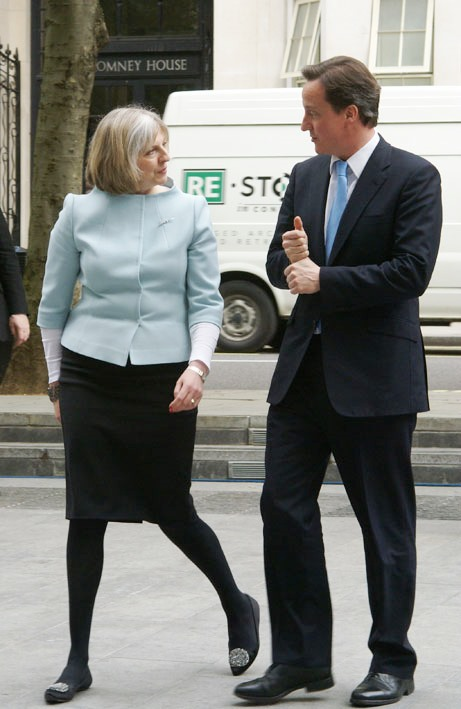
May with Prime Minister David Cameron, May 2010

On 12 May 2010, when Theresa May was appointed home secretary and minister for women and equality by Prime Minister David Cameron as part of his first Cabinet, she became the fourth woman to hold one of the British Great Offices of State, after (in order of seniority) Margaret Thatcher (prime minister), Margaret Beckett (foreign secretary) and Jacqui Smith (home secretary). As home secretary, May was also a member of the National Security Council. She is the longest-serving home secretary for over 60 years, since James Chuter Ede who served over six years and two months from 1945 until 1951. May's appointment as home secretary was unexpected, as Chris Grayling had served as shadow home secretary in opposition.

May's debut as home secretary involved overturning several of the previous Labour Government's measures on data collection and surveillance in England and Wales. By way of a Government Bill which became the Identity Documents Act 2010, she brought about the abolition of the Labour Government's National Identity Card and database scheme and reformed the regulations on the retention of DNA samples for suspects and controls on the use of CCTV cameras. On 20 May 2010, May announced the adjournment of the deportation to the United States of alleged computer hacker Gary McKinnon. She also suspended the registration scheme for carers of children and vulnerable people.

On 4 August 2010 it was reported that May was scrapping the former Labour Government's proposed "go orders" scheme to protect women from domestic violence by banning abusers from the victim's home. This was followed on 6 August 2010 by the closure of the previous government's "ContactPoint" database of 11 million under-18-year-olds designed to protect children in the wake of the Victoria Climbié child abuse scandal.

On 2 June 2010, May faced her first major national security incident as home secretary with the Cumbria shootings. She delivered her first major speech in the House of Commons as home secretary in a statement on this incident, later visiting the victims with the Prime Minister. Also in June 2010, May banned the Indian Muslim preacher Zakir Naik from entering the United Kingdom. In late June 2010, May announced plans for a temporary cap on UK visas for non-EU migrants. The move raised concerns about the impact on the UK economy.

Speaking at the Association of Chief Police Officers (ACPO) conference on 29 June 2010, May announced radical cuts to the Home Office budget, likely to lead to a reduction in police numbers. In July 2010, it was reported that May had corresponded with Kate and Gerry McCann, the parents of the missing child Madeleine McCann. In August 2010, May attended a private meeting with Mr and Mrs McCann to discuss their case.

In July 2010, May presented the House of Commons with proposals for a fundamental review of the previous Labour government's security and counter-terrorism legislation, including "stop and search" powers, and her intention to review the 28-day limit on detaining terrorist suspects without charge. In mid-July 2010, the second major gun incident during May's term took place in the north of England: a week-long police operation failed to capture and arrest Raoul Moat, an ex-convict who shot three people, killing one. The suspect later shot himself dead. During the incident, Moat was shot with a long-range taser. It later transpired that the firm supplying the taser, Pro-Tect, was in breach of its licence by supplying the police directly with the weapon. Its licence was revoked by the Home Office after the Moat shooting. On 1 October 2010 the BBC reported that the director of the company, Peter Boatman, had apparently killed himself over the incident.

In August 2010, May banned the English Defence League (EDL) from holding a march in Bradford, West Yorkshire, on 28 August. The EDL protested against the ban, claiming they planned a "peaceful demonstration". Around 2 pm on the day of the ban, violent disturbances in Bradford between EDL members and their opponents were reported, calling for intervention by riot police.

On 9 December 2010, in the wake of violent student demonstrations in central London against increases to higher-education tuition fees, May praised the actions of the police in controlling the demonstrations but was described by The Daily Telegraph as "under growing political pressure" due to her handling of the protests.

In December 2010, May declared that deployment of water cannon by police forces in mainland Britain was an operational decision which had been "resisted until now by senior police officers". She rejected their use following the widespread rioting in summer 2011 and said: "the way we police in Britain is not through use of water cannon. The way we police in Britain is through consent of communities." May said: "I condemn utterly the violence in Tottenham. ... Such disregard for public safety and property will not be tolerated, and the Metropolitan Police have my full support in restoring order." She returned to the UK from holiday to meet senior police officials on 8 August.

In the aftermath of the riots May urged the identification of as many as possible of the young criminals involved. She said: "when I was in Manchester last week, the issue was raised to me about the anonymity of juveniles who are found guilty of crimes of this sort. The Crown Prosecution Service is to order prosecutors to apply for anonymity to be lifted in any youth case they think is in the public interest. The law currently protects the identity of any suspect under the age of 18, even if they are convicted, but it also allows for an application to have such restrictions lifted, if deemed appropriate." May added that "what I've asked for is that CPS guidance should go to prosecutors to say that where possible, they should be asking for the anonymity of juveniles who are found guilty of criminal activity to be lifted."

May launched an inquiry into the phone-hacking scandal; tabloid paper journalists had been jailed in 2009 for intercepting the mobile phone messages of major public figures. The case involved a journalist employed by former News of the World editor Andy Coulson, who had later become director of communications for Prime Minister David Cameron. (Coulson was absolved of any role in the hacking incidents during a House of Commons enquiry in 2009.) Labour Party leadership candidate Ed Balls called on May to make a statement to the House on the matter. On 5 September, May told the BBC that there were "no grounds for a public enquiry". The Metropolitan Police said it might consider re-examining evidence on the allegations. On 6 September 2010, May faced parliamentary questions over the allegations following an intervention by the Speaker of the House of Commons, John Bercow.

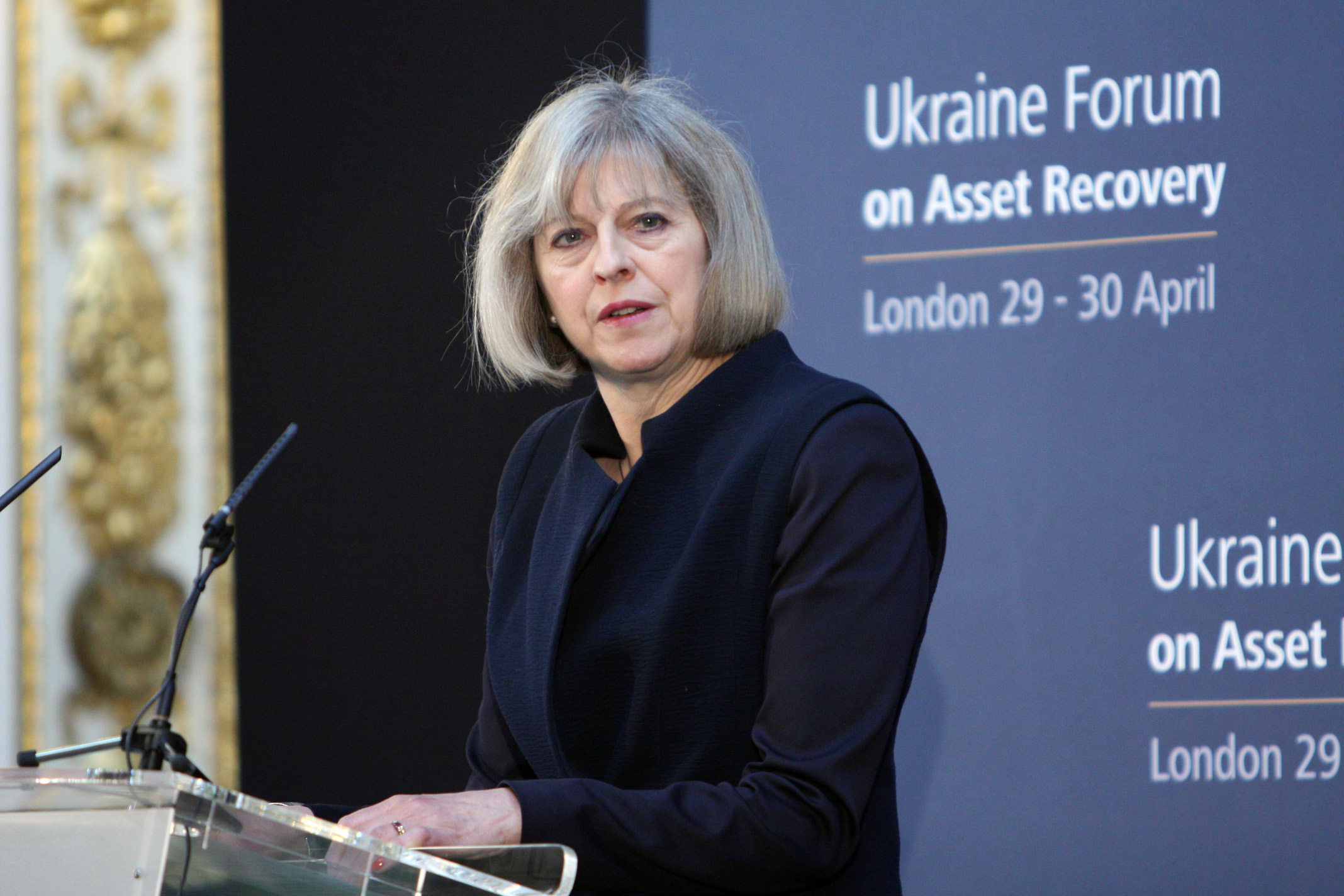
May speaking at the Ukraine Forum on Asset Recovery in 2014

At the Conservative Party Conference on 4 October 2011, while arguing that the Human Rights Act needed to be amended, May gave the example of a foreign national who the Courts ruled was allowed to remain in the UK, "because—and I am not making this up—he had a pet cat". In response, the Royal Courts of Justice issued a statement, denying that this was the reason for the tribunal's decision in that case, and stating that the real reason was that he was in a genuine relationship with a British partner, and owning a pet cat was simply one of many pieces of evidence given to show that the relationship was "genuine". The Home Office had failed to apply its own rules for dealing with unmarried partners of people settled in the UK. Amnesty International said May's comments only fuelled "myths and misconceptions" about the Human Rights Act and Justice Secretary Kenneth Clarke subsequently called May's comments "laughable and childlike".

In June 2013, May signed an order prohibiting Pamela Geller and Robert Spencer, two American bloggers who co-founded the anti-Muslim group Stop Islamization of America, from entering the United Kingdom on the basis that their presence would not be "conducive to the public good". The pair had been invited to attend an English Defence League march at Woolwich, where Drummer Lee Rigby had been killed earlier that year. The pressure group Hope not Hate led a campaign to exclude the pair, whom the Home Office described as "inflammatory speakers who promote hate".

May supported the Metropolitan Police's detention of David Miranda (partner of journalist Glenn Greenwald, who at the time of the detention worked for The Guardian) under the Terrorism Act 2000, saying that critics of the police action needed to "think about what they are condoning". Lib Dem peer and former Director of Public Prosecutions Ken Macdonald accused May of an "ugly and unhelpful" attempt to implicate those who were concerned about the police action of "condoning terrorism". The High Court subsequently acknowledged there were "indirect implications for press freedom" but ruled the detention lawful. A 2016 ruling by the Court of Appeal found that the provision of the Terrorism Act used for Miranda's detention was "incompatible with the European convention on human rights", but that the detention itself was lawful.

On 29 August 2014, the British government raised the terrorist threat level to "severe", as Prime Minister David Cameron and May warned a terrorist attack was "highly likely" following the coming to prominence of the Islamic State of Iraq and the Levant. May said that there was no intelligence warning of an imminent attack.

== Police and crime ==
On 26 July 2010, May announced a package of reforms to policing in England and Wales in the House of Commons. The previous Labour Government's central crime agency, SOCA (Serious Organised Crime Agency), was to be replaced by a new National Crime Agency. In common with the Conservative Party 2010 general election manifesto's flagship proposal for a "Big Society" based on voluntary action, May also proposed increasing the role of civilian "reservists" for crime control. The reforms were rejected by the opposition Labour Party.

Following the actions of a minority of black bloc in vandalising allegedly tax-avoiding shops and businesses on 26 March, the day of a march by the TUC, May unveiled reforms curbing the right to protest, including giving police extra powers to remove masked individuals and to police social networking sites to prevent illegal protest without police consent or notification.

In July 2013, May welcomed the fact that crime had fallen by more than ten percent under the coalition government, while still being able to make savings. She said that this was partly due to the government removing red tape and scrapping targets to allow the police to concentrate on crime fighting.

She also refused an inquiry into the poisoning of Alexander Litvinenko citing effect on international relations.

In 2014, May delivered a well-known speech to the Police Federation, in which she criticised many aspects of the culture of the police force. In the speech, she said:

When you remember the list of recent revelations about police misconduct, it is not enough to mouth platitudes about "a few bad apples". The problem might lie with a minority of officers, but it is still a significant problem, and a problem that needs to be addressed ... according to one survey carried out recently, only 42% of black people from a Caribbean background trust the police. That is simply not sustainable ... I will soon publish proposals to strengthen the protections available to whistleblowers in the police. I am creating a new criminal offence of police corruption. And I am determined that the use of stop and search must come down, become more targeted and lead to more arrests.

=== "Snooper's Charter" ===
May also championed the Investigatory Powers Act 2016, popularly dubbed the "Snooper's Charter", requiring internet and mobile service providers to keep records of internet usage, voice calls, messages and email for up to a year in case police requested access to the records whilst investigating a crime. The Liberal Democrats had blocked the first attempt, but after the Conservative Party obtained a majority in the 2015 general election May announced a new Draft Investigatory Powers Bill similar to the Draft Communications Data Bill, although with more limited powers and additional oversight.

=== Anti-social behaviour ===
On 28 July 2010, May proposed to review the previous Labour Government's anti-social behaviour legislation signalling the abolition of the "Anti-social behaviour order" (ASBO). She identified the policy's high level of failure with almost half of ASBOs breached between 2000 and 2008, leading to "fast-track" criminal convictions. May proposed a less punitive, community-based approach to tackling social disorder. May suggested that anti-social behaviour policy "must be turned on its head", reversing the ASBO's role as the flagship crime control policy legislation under Labour. Former Labour Home Secretaries David Blunkett (who introduced ASBOs) and Alan Johnson expressed their disapproval of the proposals.

=== Drug policy ===
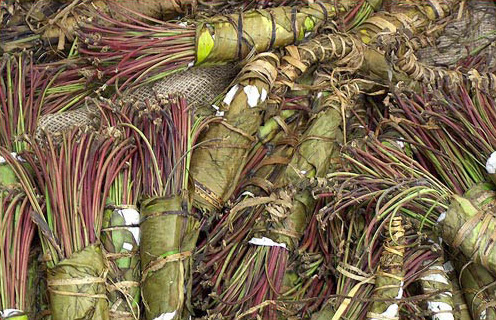
Khat bundles

In July 2013, May decided to ban the stimulant khat, against the advice of the Advisory Council on the Misuse of Drugs (ACMD). The council reached the conclusion that there was "insufficient evidence" it caused health problems.

Explaining the change in the classification, May said: "The decision to bring khat under control is finely balanced and takes into account the expert scientific advice and these broader concerns", and pointed out that the product had already been banned in the majority of other EU member states, as well as most of the G8 countries including Canada and the US.

A report on khat use by the ACMD published in January 2013 had noted the product had been associated with "acute psychotic episodes", "chronic liver disease" and family breakdown. However, it concluded that there is no risk of harm for most users, and recommended that khat remain uncontrolled due to lack of evidence for these associations.

Liberal Democrat minister Norman Baker accused May of suppressing proposals to treat rather than prosecute minor drug offenders from a report into drug policy commissioned by the Home Office. The Home Office denied that its officials had considered this as part of their strategy. Baker cited difficulties in working with May as the reason for his resignation from the Home Office in the run-up to the 2015 general election.

== Immigration ==
In 2010, May promised to bring the level of net migration down to less than 100,000. In February 2015, The Independent reported, "The Office for National Statistics (ONS) announced a net flow of 298,000 migrants to the UK in the 12 months to September 2014—up from 210,000 in the previous year." In total, 624,000 people migrated to the UK in the year ending September 2014 and 327,000 left in the same period. Statistics showed "significant increases in migration among both non-EU citizens – up 49,000 to 292,000 – and EU citizens, which rose by 43,000 to 251,000."

May rejected the European Union's proposal of compulsory refugee quotas. She said that it was important to help people living in war-zone regions and refugee camps but "not the ones who are strong and rich enough to come to Europe". In May 2016, The Daily Telegraph reported that she had tried to save £4m by rejecting an intelligence project to use aircraft surveillance to detect illegal immigrant boats.

=== Hostile environment policy ===
The Home Office's role in the Windrush scandal was highlighted in a 2019 parliamentary report. MPs sitting on the Public Accounts Committee accused the Home Office of "complacency" and a "lack of concern" over its handling of the cases of wrongly deported British citizens. The Public Accounts Committee report found that the Home Office had not acted on a report produced by the Legal Action Group in 2014, warning of the negative effects of hostile environment policies on Jamaican migrants who arrived in the UK before 1973. It had also not taken action in response to a 2016 diplomatic telegram sent by the Foreign Office to the Home Office that informed of warnings from Caribbean Commonwealth Ministers about Windrush migrants.

=== Family migration ===
European Economic Area members in blue and green

On 11 June 2012, May announced to Parliament that new restrictions would be introduced, intended to reduce the number of non-European Economic Area family migrants. The changes were mostly intended to apply to new applicants after 9 July 2012. The new rules came into effect from 9 July 2012 allowing only those British citizens earning more than £18,600 to bring their spouse or their child to live with them in the UK. This figure would rise significantly in cases where visa applications are also made for children. They also increased the current two-year probationary period for partners to five years. The rules also prevent any adult and elderly dependents from settling in the UK unless they can demonstrate that, as a result of age, illness or disability, they require a level of long-term personal care that can only be provided by a relative in the UK.

An MP who was concerned about this addressed May in Parliament as to whether she had examined the impact on communities and families on modest incomes, but he received no direct response. Liberty concluded that the new rules showed scant regard to the impact they would have on genuine families. The all-party parliamentary group on migration conducted an evidence based inquiry into the impact of the rules and concluded in their report that the rules were causing very young children to be separated from their parents and could exile British citizens from the UK.

==== Deportation decisions ====
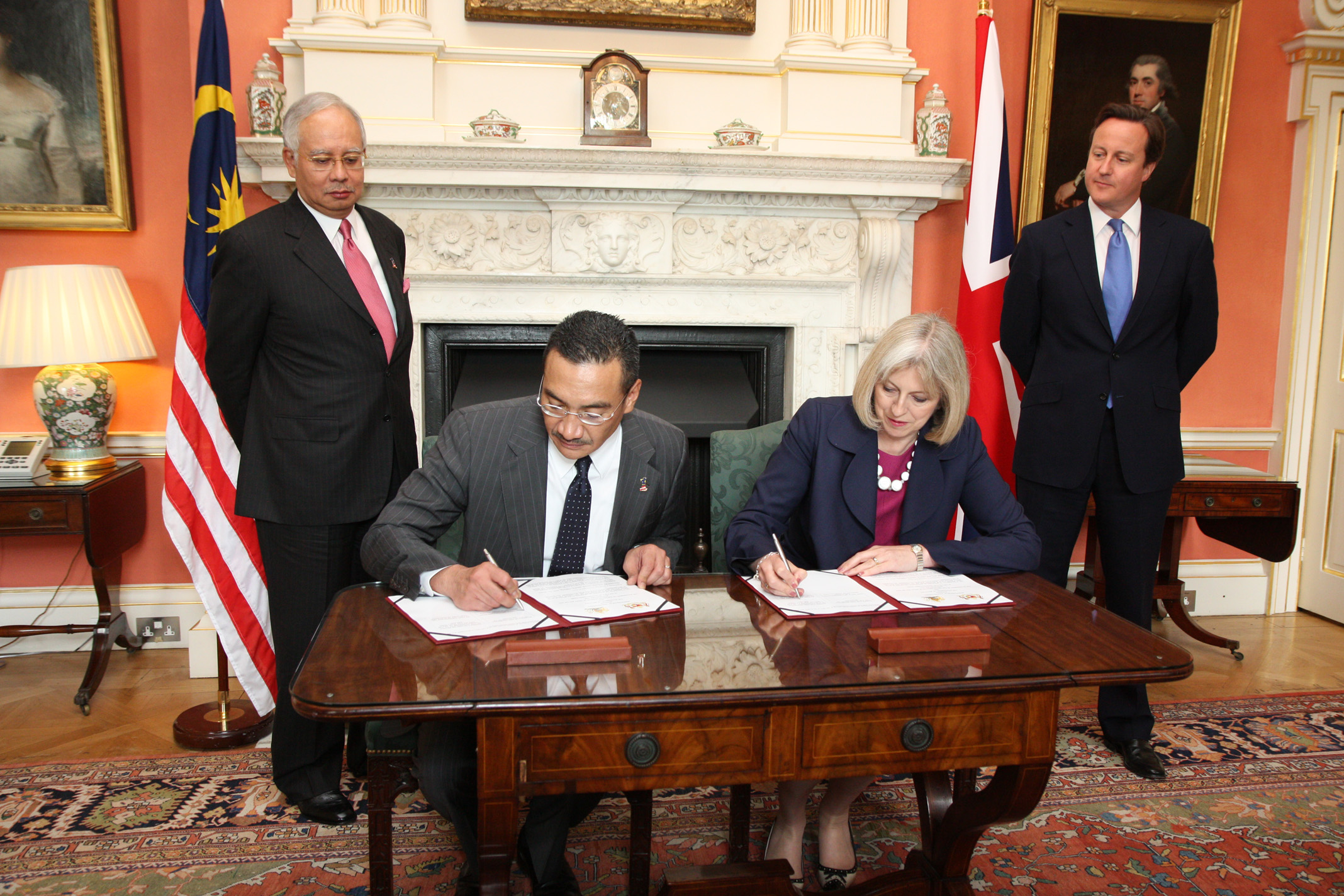
May, David Cameron and Malaysian Prime Minister Najib Razak, 14 July 2011

In June 2012, May was found in contempt of court by Judge Barry Cotter, and stood accused of "totally unacceptable and regrettable behaviour", being said to have shown complete disregard for a legal agreement to free an Algerian from a UK Immigration Detention Centre. As she eventually allowed the prisoner to be freed, May avoided further sanctions including fines or imprisonment.

May responded to a Supreme Court decision in November 2013 to overturn her predecessor Jacqui Smith's revocation of Iraqi-born terror suspect Al Jedda's British citizenship by ordering it to be revoked for a second time, making him the first person to be stripped of British citizenship twice.

May was accused by Lord Roberts, over the deportation of mentally ill Nigerian man Isa Muazu, of being willing to allow someone to die "to score a political point". According to Muazu's solicitor, May had arranged for the asylum seeker, who was said to be "near death" after a 100-day hunger strike, to be deported by a chartered private jet. To strengthen the Home Office's tough stance an "end of life" plan was reportedly offered to Muazu, who was one of a number of hunger strikers at the Harmondsworth Immigration Removal Centre.

=== Abu Qatada deportation ===
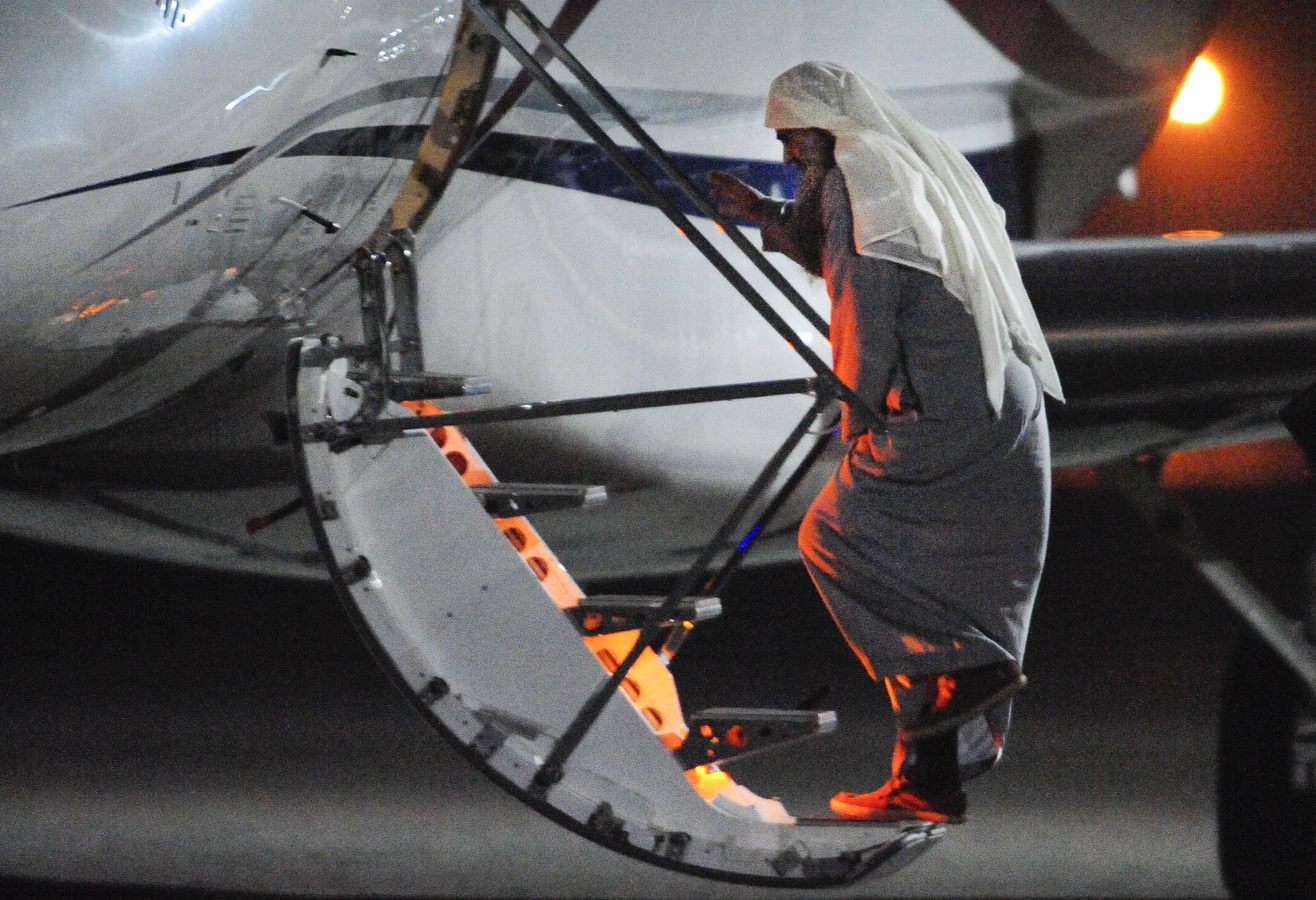
Abu Qatada boards a plane for deportation to Jordan

On 7 July 2013, Abu Qatada, a radical cleric arrested in 2002, was deported to Jordan after a decade-long battle that had cost the government £1.7 million in legal fees, and numerous prior home secretaries had been unable to resolve. The deportation was the result of a treaty negotiated by May in April 2013, under which Jordan agreed to give Qatada a fair trial, and to refrain from torturing him or using evidence obtained by torture.

May has frequently pointed to Qatada's deportation as a triumph, guaranteeing in September 2013 that "he will not be returning to the UK", and declaring in her 2016 leadership campaign announcement that she was told that she "couldn't deport Abu Qatada" but that she "flew to Jordan and negotiated the treaty that got him out of Britain for good". The Qatada deportation also shaped May's views on the European Convention on Human Rights and European Court of Human Rights, saying that they had "moved the goalposts" and had a "crazy interpretation of our human rights laws", as a result, May has since campaigned against the institutions, saying that British withdrawal from them should be considered.

=== Passport backlog ===
By mid 2014, American company 3M which makes the RFID microchips in new passports, and their client, the Passport Office, revealed allegations of a large backlog in developing processing passport applications appeared. David Cameron suggested that this had come about due to the Passport Office's receiving an "above normal" 300,000-rise in applications. It was revealed, however, that May had been warned the year before, in July 2013, that a surge of 350,000 extra applications could occur owing to the closure of processing overseas under Chancellor Osborne's programme of cuts. Around £674,000 was paid to staff who helped clear the backlog.

== Other issues ==
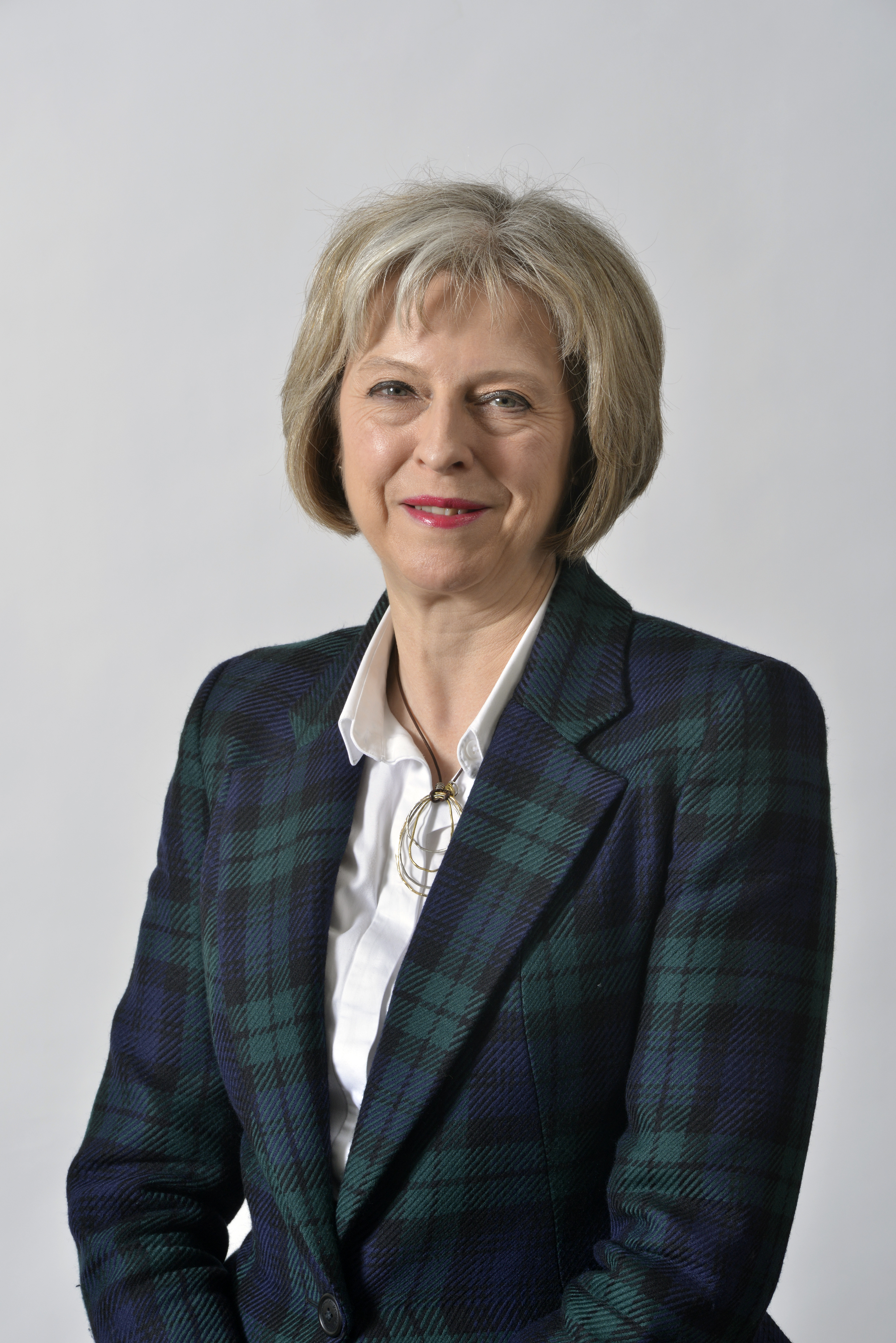
Second term official portrait, 2015

=== Birmingham schools row ===
In June 2014, an inflamed public argument arose between Home Office and Education Ministers about responsibility for alleged extremism in Birmingham schools. Prime Minister David Cameron's intervened to resolve the row, insisting that May sack her Special Advisor Fiona Cunningham for releasing on May's website a confidential letter to May's colleagues, and that Michael Gove, the Education Secretary, apologise to the Home Office's head of Security and Counter-Terrorism, Charles Farr, for uncomplimentary briefings of him appearing on the front page of The Times.

=== UK Border Agency ===
UK Border Agency had a chequered history. There were difficulties with the management of student visas under Tier 4 of the Points-Based System. The assessment of the Independent Chief Inspector, carried out between July and August 2010, found that there was an inconsistent response towards applications, with some cases given extra time to prepare and others dismissed for minor reasons.

In November 2011, the Home Affairs Select Committee issued a report that found that 124,000 deportation cases had been shelved by the UKBA. The report said the cases had been dumped in a "controlled archive", a term used to try to hide the fact from authorities and auditors that it was a list of lost applicants.

Following allegations that staff were told to relax some identity checks, in November 2011 the UK Home Office suspended Brodie Clark, the Head of the UK Border Agency; Carole Upshall, director of the Border Agency South and European Operation; Graham Kyle, director of operations at Heathrow Airport. The Home Office investigated allegations that Clark had agreed to "open up the borders" at certain times in ways ministers would "not have agreed with". The BBC reported that staff may have been told not to scan biometric passports at certain times. A biometric passport contains a digital image of the holder's face, which can be used to compare with the printed version and check the passport has not been forged. It is also believed that "warning index checks" at Heathrow and Calais were also suspended, which would have applied strict security checks against official watchlists of terrorists, criminals, and deported illegal immigrants. Clarke stated that May had agreed the plan and directed it, and that she was blaming a civil servant, rather than resigning as home secretary.

After Clark refused the offer to take early retirement, he was suspended and the investigation began. A two-week inquiry led by former Metropolitan Police detective Dave Wood, head of the agency's enforcement and crime group at the time, sought to discover to what extent checks were scaled down, and what the security implications might have been. A second investigation, led by former MI6 official Mike Anderson (the Director General of the Home Office's strategy, immigration and international group), sought to investigate wider issues relating to the performance of UKBA regarding racism. The issues relating to lost documents and case files was still going on at the same time, along with a backlog of cases.

It was then announced on 5 November by Theresa May that an independent inquiry would also be undertaken, led by the Chief Inspector of the UK Border Agency, John Vine. Following all these combined failings, UK Border Force became a separate organisation on 1 March 2012.

It later emerged that May had directed and agreed the plan with Clarke, but May states that these checks went further than she agreed.

=== Greville Janner abuse concerns ===
In April 2015, May said she was "very concerned" about the decision not to prosecute the Labour politician Lord Janner over allegations of historical child sex abuse. Alison Saunders, the Director of Public Prosecutions, said that although there was enough evidence to bring charges against Janner, he was unfit to stand trial.

=== Saudi Arabia ===
In March 2014, May signed a secret security pact with Saudi Arabia's Crown Prince Muhammad bin Nayef. Liberal Democrat MP Tim Farron told The Independent: "Deals with nations like Saudi Arabia should not be done in secret."

In 2015, May supported a £5.9 million contract to help run prisons in Saudi Arabia. It was supported by the then Justice Secretary, Chris Grayling. The contract was scrapped in October 2015, due to opposition from the new Justice Secretary, Michael Gove, despite resistance from Foreign Secretary Philip Hammond.

== See also ==
- Premiership of David Cameron
- TOEIC Visa scandal
- Windrush scandal
