= Racism in the British Conservative Party =

There have been incidents of racism in the Conservative Party since at least 1964. Conservative shadow defence minister Enoch Powell's "Rivers of Blood" speech in 1968 was both influential and widely regarded as anti-immigrant with racist overtones; the party's leader at the time, Edward Heath, condemned it, although some Conservative MPs defended Powell's speech. Since then, accusations have been made about several leading members of the party and its policies; these have related to prejudice against non-white people.

== History: 1950s–70s ==
=== Winston Churchill ===
In 1955, the then Leader of the Conservative Party Winston Churchill expressed his support for the slogan "Keep England White" with regard to immigration from the West Indies.

=== 1964 general election ===
In the constituency of Smethwick during the 1964 general election, supporters of Conservative candidate Peter Griffiths were reported to have used the slogan "if you want a nigger for a neighbour, vote Labour". The Conservatives always denied the slogan was theirs, saying it was the work of far-right activists; neo-Nazi British Movement leader Colin Jordan later claimed responsibility for originating the slogan. However, during the campaign, Griffiths did not condemn the phrase and was quoted in The Times as saying, "I should think that is a manifestation of popular feeling. I would not condemn anyone who said that", adding that the quote represented "exasperation, not fascism".

In 1964, a delegation of white residents of one Smethwick street successfully petitioned the Conservative council to compulsorily buy vacant houses to prevent people of colour from buying them. Richard Crossman, Labour housing minister, prevented this from happening by refusing to allow the council to borrow money to enact their policy.

Griffiths was a personal supporter of segregation. Of apartheid in South Africa, he said "Apartheid, if it could be separated from racialism, could well be an alternative to integration."

Tim Stanley of The Telegraph notes that while "there were pockets of racism on the Left as well as the Right ... there's no denying that the Tory fringes became a bastion of ugliness that the present-day party is still trying to distance itself from". He goes on to argue that this campaign had two legacies — initially, the degradation of race relations in the UK, which consequently "poisoned the debate over immigration" in the UK by "drag[ging] politics into the gutter".

=== Enoch Powell's "Rivers of Blood" speech ===
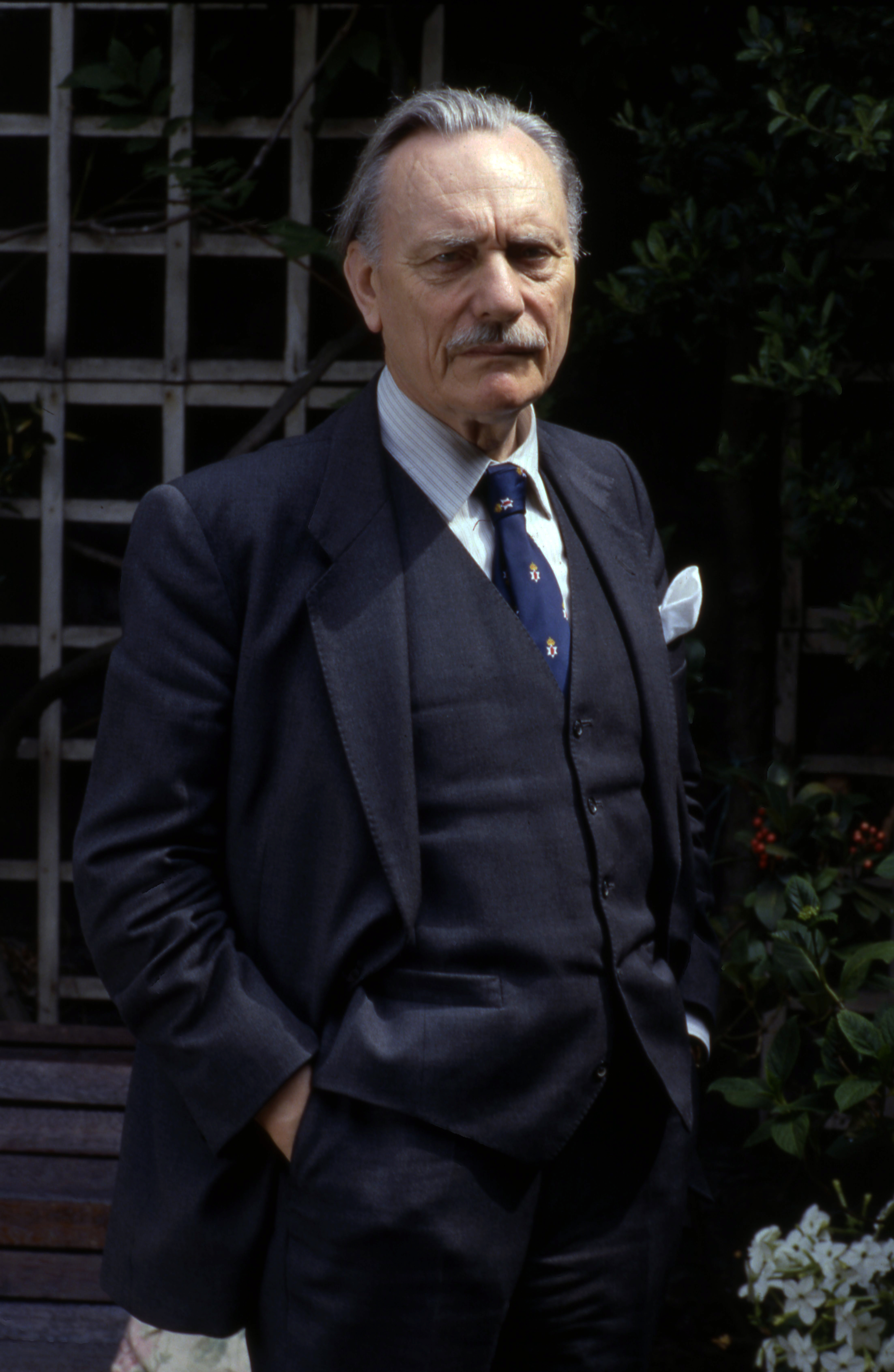
Enoch Powell

The racialised debate and discourse over immigration in British politics are said to have become popularised by Conservative MP Enoch Powell's "Rivers of Blood" speech in April 1968, and the clamping down on postwar "new Commonwealth" non-white immigration, while allowing concessions to the white-majority "old Commonwealth" (i.e. Australia, New Zealand, South Africa and Canada). Reactions to the 1968 Race Relations Bill, which Powell's speech was aimed against, were considered "a turning point from biological racist discourses to cultural racist discourses", with Powell being the chief articulator of this "new racism" in British politics.

When asked whether he was "a racialist" by journalist David Frost, Powell said:

[I]f, by being a racialist, you mean be conscious of differences between men and nations, some of which coincide with differences in race, then we're all racialist ... But if, by a racialist, you mean a man who despises a human being because he belongs to another race, or a man who believes that one race is inherently superior to another in civilisation or capability of civilisation, then the answer is emphatically no ... I do not talk about black and white.

However, it was seen as a racist speech by many commentators, both at the time and today. The Times said in April 1968, following the speech:

The language, the innuendoes, the constant appeals to self-pity, the anecdotes, all combine to make a deliberate appeal to racial prejudice. This is the first time a serious British politician has appealed to racial hatred, in this direct way, in our postwar history. It occurred within a couple of weeks of the murder of Martin Luther King and the burning in many American cities. It is almost unbelievable that any man should be so irresponsible as to promote hatred in the face of these examples of the results that can follow.

Edward Heath also said in 1968 that the speech was "racialist in tone and liable to exacerbate racial tensions", and The Times went on to record incidents of racial attacks in the immediate aftermath of Powell's speech. Despite this condemnation, according to most accounts, the speech was actually popular among a majority of the white British population at the time. The popularity of Powell's perspective on immigration may even have played a decisive factor in the Conservatives' victory in the 1970 general election.

An opinion poll commissioned by the BBC television programme Panorama in December 1968 found that eight per cent of immigrants believed they had been treated worse by white people since Powell's speech. Subsequent researchers have blamed the speech for leading to a rise in "Paki-bashing", i.e. violent attacks against British Pakistanis and other British Asians, which were unleashed shortly after the inflammatory speech. These attacks peaked during the 1970s and 1980s. However, there is "little agreement on the extent to which Powell was responsible for racial attacks", although Hillman notes that in his speech, Powell "foreshadowed this debate by declaring that 'people are disposed to mistake predicting troubles for causing troubles'." Powell, however, consistently refused to accept any blame for racial violence which occurred after his speech.

Some leading Conservatives in the Shadow Cabinet were outraged by the speech. Iain Macleod, Edward Boyle, Quintin Hogg and Robert Carr all threatened to resign from the front bench unless Powell was sacked. Macleod never spoke to Powell ever again. Consequently, Heath sacked Powell from his post as Shadow Defence Secretary. Some Conservative MPs on the right of the party, such as Duncan Sandys, Gerald Nabarro and Teddy Taylor, spoke out against his sacking and defended Powell's comments.

On 3 June 1970, Labour MP Tony Benn also criticised Powell, saying "the flag of racialism which is being hoisted over Wolverhampton is beginning to look like the one which "fluttered 25 years ago over Dachau and Belsen".

Powell later told a November 1995 BBC documentary that "racism is the basis of nationality". Later, Stuart Hall and Paul Foot both claimed that Powell was a racist, with Foot likening Powell's comments to the far-right arguments put forth by the British National Party and National Socialist Movement organisations of the 1960s. Margaret Thatcher denied that Powell was a racist, saying that the "Rivers of Blood" speech had been misquoted in the press. Simon Heffer and Patrick Cosgrave both absolve Powell of racial prejudice, with Cosgrave insisting that Powell was talking in terms of identity, not race.

The Conservative government acknowledged that the 1971 Immigration Act would be seen as disproportionately benefiting "the 'white' Commonwealth", but Home Secretary Reginald Maudling defended the partiality clause, saying it "recognised the family connection with the British diaspora abroad and was not a racial concept".

== 1980s–1990s ==
=== Margaret Thatcher ===
In 1978, while still leader of the opposition, Thatcher told ITV's World in Action that "People [in Britain] are rather afraid that this country might be swamped by people with a different culture", which was seen as politicising the issue of race in UK politics. In 2014, the then Defence Secretary Michael Fallon apologised for saying that British towns were being "swamped" and "under siege [with] large numbers of migrant workers and people claiming benefits"; these comments were likened by freelance writer Stuart Jeffries in The Guardian to Thatcher and Enoch Powell's rhetoric.

Matthew Parris argues that, as a clerk handling Thatcher's general correspondence at the time, he received 5,000 letters reacting to the interview, almost all of them positive. Fraser Nelson argued that Thatcher's speech was necessary to combat the rise of the National Front by using "plain-speaking" rhetoric to attract their voters. Parris also argues that Thatcher regretted the tone of her words in later years.

Race riots occurred in Thatcher's Britain, such as those in St. Paul's (1980), Brixton and Toxteth (1981) and Tottenham (1985), which brought heightened political saliency to the 'race issue' in British politics. It is commonly assumed that the Conservative Party under Thatcher had adopted a strong assimilationist stance and was hostile to the concept of multiculturalism.

==== Apartheid ====
Former Conservative PM Margaret Thatcher was warned by her Foreign Secretary, Geoffrey Howe, that she would be seen as a "friend of apartheid" due to her government's refusal to impose sanctions on apartheid South Africa in the run-up to the 1986 Commonwealth Games. They were boycotted by 32 of the 59 eligible countries due to Britain's refusal to sever sporting ties with South Africa. In his memoirs, he commented that "Margaret would quite rightly denounce the violence of ANC terrorism, but without ever acknowledging, even by the tone of voice, that the whole white-controlled repressive structure of the apartheid legal system was bound itself to provoke inter-racial conflict".

Thatcher also refused Howe's pleas to make a speech in the House of Commons condemning apartheid. Patrick Wright, former head of the Diplomatic Service, alleged that Thatcher wanted "a whites-only South Africa". Conservative MP Terry Dicks described Mandela as a "black terrorist"; at the same time, the Federation of Conservative Students had conferences "littered" with "Hang Nelson Mandela" posters, and Conservative MP Teddy Taylor argued that "Mandela should be shot".

Thatcher opposed sanctions imposed on South Africa by the Commonwealth and the European Economic Community (EEC). She attempted to preserve trade with South Africa, while persuading the government there to abandon apartheid. This included "[c]asting herself as President Botha's candid friend", and inviting him to visit the UK in 1984, in spite of the "inevitable demonstrations" against his government. Notes by Botha's foreign minister written on his 1984 trip to the UK claim that Thatcher told him that "apartheid had to be dismantled, Mandela and other prisoners released" as well as stopping the "forcible removal of urban blacks".

Alan Merrydew of the Canadian broadcaster BCTV News asked Thatcher what her response was "to a reported ANC statement that they will target British firms in South Africa?" She replied, "when the ANC says that they will target British companies. This shows what a typical terrorist organisation it is. I fought terrorism all my life and if more people fought it, and we were all more successful, we should not have it and I hope that everyone in this hall will think it is right to go on fighting terrorism."

Anti-apartheid activists saw Thatcher's comments as making excuses for the apartheid government while "placing the blame for government repression firmly on the side of the anti-government opposition"; however, Thatcher later acknowledged to a Conservative backbencher that:

The exclusion of blacks from the political process has inevitably led to increasing dissatisfaction. Although not to be condoned, this has been a powerful factor in impelling black political leaders to seek by violence what is denied them by the laws under which they live. The institutionalised discrimination and second-class status accorded to blacks in South Africa ... continues to be an affront to the rest of Africa and to those of us who live in a free society and uphold its values.

During his visit to Britain five months after his release from prison, Nelson Mandela praised Thatcher: "She is an enemy of apartheid ... We have much to thank her for", but noted that they were in disagreement on how to end the practise.

Anti-apartheid activist Reverend Desmond Tutu was highly critical of the attitude of the Conservative Party and Thatcher towards apartheid. In the 1980s, he also condemned Western political leaders, including Thatcher, for retaining links with the South African government, stipulating that "support of this racist policy is racist". He and his wife boycotted a lecture given at the Federal Theological Institute by former British prime minister Alec Douglas-Home in the 1960s; Tutu noted that they did so because the Conservative Party had "behaved abominably over issues which touched our hearts most nearly".

In 1989, future prime minister David Cameron went on a "sanctions-busting jolly" to South Africa with the anti-sanctions Conservative Research Department, for which he was criticised by veteran anti-apartheid campaigner and Labour MP Peter Hain.

=== John Major ministry ===
Major's ministry was marked to a greater effort to acknowledge Britain's cultural and ethnic diversity yet continue with a "dual interventionist strategy" of combining immigration controls with anti-discriminatory measures. Major's attempts to reconcile attitudes towards immigration within the party were sometimes opposed by the party's grassroots.

In December 1990, the Cheltenham Conservative Association tried to deselect John Taylor after he was selected by Central Office to become the Conservative candidate for Cheltenham in the 1992 general election. The campaign was seen as having been influenced by racism, with Taylor's Caribbean background reportedly causing concern to some members of the local Conservative constituency association. Bill Galbraith, an opponent of Taylor's candidacy, said that the Conservative Central Office should not have "foisted" a "bloody nigger" upon the people of Cheltenham. Central Office expelled Galbraith over the issue. Taylor's inability to win such a 'safe seat' for the Tories has "often been attributed to the alleged racial prejudice of the local Tory electorate and to the ambivalence, to say the least, of the local Conservative association".

Labour accused the Conservative Party of "playing the race card" in the 1991 Langbaurgh by-election, by needlessly emphasising the race and place of birth (Haridwar, Uttar Pradesh, India) of the local candidate, Ashok Kumar. The then Deputy Leader of the Labour Party Roy Hattersley called the campaign on race "the dirtiest campaign I have known since the Tories did very similar things in Smethwick, 27 years ago".

In 1994, African American civil rights minister Jesse Jackson garnered controversy by seemingly comparing the Conservative Party's policies to racism, fascism and apartheid, saying: "We must no longer allow the clock to be turned back on human rights or put up with political systems which are content to maintain the status quo. In South Africa the status quo was called racism. We rebelled against it. In Germany it was called fascism. Now in Britain and the US, it is called conservatism". Jackson's comments were condemned by Conservative MP Peter Bottomley as "stereotypical ignorance".

== Tories in opposition: 1997–2010 ==
In 2001 Edgar Griffin, father of Nick Griffin, was sacked from the party due to his support for his son's far-right British National Party. Griffin claimed to have rank and file Tory support for his views, which included financial subsidies for "the coloured folk" to leave the UK. This, combined with Conservative MP John Townend's claim that immigrants were "undermin[ing]" the purity of Britain's "homogeneous Anglo-Saxon society" and were causing a rise in crime rates across the UK led Conservative MP Andrew Lansley to say that there was "endemic racism in the Tory party".

In 2002, former Times journalist Anthony Browne authored "Do We Need Mass Immigration?", published by Civitas. This book accused British Muslims of having divided loyalties. Subsequent articles by Browne for The Spectator accused immigrants of spreading hepatitis and HIV/AIDS in the UK. Browne was elected as a Conservative MP at the 2019 general election.

In June 2008, then-London mayor Boris Johnson dismissed one of his most senior advisers after saying "let them go if they don't like it here" in response to older Black Caribbean immigrants leaving the capital because of Johnson's administration.

In July that year, Lord Dixon-Smith used the idiom "nigger in the woodpile" to refer to concerns over government housing legislation. During the debate, Conservative peer Lord Brook of Sutton Mandeville called for Dixon-Smith to apologise for the comment, which he did immediately; however, the racist origins of the phrase (referring to escaped slaves from the American Deep South) caused widespread criticism from all political parties. David Cameron, then the Leader of the Opposition, described Dixon-Smith's comments as "not appropriate" but refused to dismiss him.

In 2009, Conservative councillor Bob Allen put an image of a gorilla next to a blog about Asian Labour Councillor Dr Ebrahim Adia.

== Accusations against Boris Johnson ==
As editor of The Spectator, Boris Johnson was strongly criticised for allowing columnist Taki Theodoracopulos to publish racist and antisemitic language in the magazine, including Theodoracopulos' claim that black people have lower IQs than white people.

In 2002, Johnson described black people as "piccaninnies" with "watermelon smiles" in a Telegraph article about then-prime minister Tony Blair visiting West Africa. No disciplinary action was taken by the party. His 2006 comparison between the frequently changing leadership of the Conservatives to cannibalism in Papua New Guinea drew criticism from the country's high commission. In April 2016, in an article for The Sun, in response to a false accusation that Barack Obama had removed a bust of Winston Churchill from the Oval Office following Obama's inauguration, Johnson wrote that Obama was motivated by "the part-Kenyan president's ancestral dislike of the British Empire – of which Churchill had been such a fervent defender". The comments were described as "deeply offensive" by Churchill's grandson, Conservative MP Sir Nicholas Soames, who called the article "deplorable" and "completely idiotic". The Conservative party did not hold an investigation or take any disciplinary action. Obama called Johnson the British version of Donald Trump following the article, and was "taken aback" by the perceived racial connotations of Johnson's remarks.

== 2010–present ==
=== May and Rudd: "Hostile environment" and Windrush ===
The use of "Go Home" vans to deter illegal immigration to the UK was criticised as dog-whistle racism by Labour's Diane Abbott, as well as impractical. The Observer wrote that, "The government's hostile-environment policy, in which private citizens such as landlords are obliged to check people's papers, increases discrimination against people with foreign names and is ineffective at reducing illegal immigration. Yet it has pursued this policy to win support from voters it fears might otherwise back the far right."

Amber Rudd became Home Secretary following Theresa May's appointment as prime minister, serving for almost two years of May's premiership. Although Rudd was seen as having a more relaxed attitude towards race and immigration, her 2016 conference speech was criticised by the leader of the Labour Party, Jeremy Corbyn, as fanning "the flames of xenophobia and hatred" by forcing firms to declare the percentage of foreign workers they employ. LBC radio host James O'Brien likened the speech to Chapter 2 of Adolf Hitler's Mein Kampf; this analogy was criticised by Ed West in The Spectator.

As part of the "hostile environment" policy, many citizens of the Windrush generation — some who had lived in Britain for more than half a century — were wrongly deported in what became known as the "Windrush scandal".

Rudd, May and Conservative Party chairman Brandon Lewis were accused by some, such as Hugh Muir and Hannah Jane Parkinson in The Guardian, of institutional racism by defending a policy which disproportionately affected black Britons. British Afro-Caribbean academic Kehinde Andrews wrote for CNN: "Public and political pressure has forced Prime Minster [sic] Theresa May to apologize. But it was her Conservative Party's policies that created the scandal in the first place", adding that "The treatment of the Windrush generation is appalling, but unfortunately not surprising. Racism is as British as a cup of tea." Parkinson also accused the government of racist hypocrisy, in that it was forcing the Windrush generation of British nationals to prove their identity to stay in the UK, while lessening restrictions on foreign oligarchs.

In April 2018, it was revealed that the Home Office had come up with targets for removing illegal immigrants from the UK, a policy of which Home Secretary Rudd denied all knowledge, despite writing in a private letter to May of an "ambitious but deliverable" target for an increase in the enforced deportation of immigrants. The Shadow Home Secretary, Diane Abbott, said that "immigration officials may have been looking for soft targets in the shape of West Indian pensioners who don't have hot shot lawyers", and the Shadow Minister for Diverse Communities, Dawn Butler, accused Theresa May of "presiding over a government that has policies that are institutionally racist". Rudd resigned on 30 April 2018 in the aftermath of the scandal, saying that she had "inadvertently misled" MPs over targets for removing illegal immigrants.

=== Support for Viktor Orbán ===
In September 2018, as members of ACRE, Conservative MEPs supported the right-wing populist Hungarian Prime Minister, Viktor Orbán, against a motion to censure him in the European Parliament. Conservative sources told The Independent that the opposition to the vote was in order to gain "brownie points" from Orbán's administration in order to make him more amenable to a post-Brexit trade deal. The Conservatives were the only governing conservative party in western Europe to vote against the censure.

The Board of Deputies of British Jews accused the Conservative government of defending Hungary's "appalling track record" of "vivid antisemitism", saying: "we are very alarmed by the messages at the heart of Orbán's election campaign, including his comments about 'Muslim invaders', calling migrants poison, and the vivid antisemitism in the relentless campaign against Jewish philanthropist George Soros." Only one Conservative MEP voted in favour of the motion (Baroness Mobarik), with two abstentions (Charles Tannock and Sajjad Karim). The Muslim Council of Britain (MCB) said that the Conservative Party was giving "bigotry a free pass" and viewing the rights of minorities, including Muslims, Jews and immigrants as "expendable as support is sought for the government's Brexit position".

=== Accusations against Nadine Dorries ===
In February 2019, Nadine Dorries referred to political commentator Ash Sarkar as prospective Labour Party candidate Faiza Shaheen, an action which was subsequently criticised by Sayeeda Warsi and others. It emerged that Dorries had previously made allegedly racist remarks about Chuka Umunna in 2013, and Yasmin Alibhai-Brown and Sadiq Khan in 2018.

=== Other incidents ===
In 2010, Conservative councillor for Pendle Smith Benson said there were "too many Pakis" in the town, and in 2015, Bob Fahey, a Leicestershire councillor, allegedly referred to a fellow Conservative colleague as a "chink". Both were allowed to keep their elected positions following these controversies.

David Whittingham, Conservative councillor for Fareham in Portsmouth, was suspended in 2016 after a "racist rant" to senior officers, in which he expressed his disapproval of foreigners living on the same road as him.

In June 2017, Rosemary Carroll (Conservative councillor for – and former mayor of – Pendle) was suspended for three months after she compared Asian benefit claimants to dogs in a Facebook post. In June 2018, she regained the seat, allowing the party to gain control of the council that year; the Conservatives did not issue any further disciplinary measures for her actions.

In July 2017, Conservative MP Anne Marie Morris used the phrase "nigger in the woodpile" in reference to a "no-deal" Brexit at a meeting of Eurosceptics in central London. The Huffington Post leaked this audio, while noting that no other Conservative MPs on the panel reacted to the racist phraseology. She was suspended from the party on 10 July following her remarks. She was later restored to the party.

The Johnson ministry's breaking of precedent in refusing an automatic peerage to Britain's first black archbishop John Sentamu – which the government claimed was because of a pledge to reduce the number of peers in the House of Lords – during Black History Month was criticised by Operation Black Vote. Labour MP David Lammy tweeted "No 10 broke a precedent and snubbed Britain's first black archbishop for a peerage because it says the House of Lords is too large, but it made room for Ian Botham, Claire Fox and Theresa May's husband. Blatant institutional prejudice." (Theresa May's husband Philip May in fact received a knighthood, not a peerage.)

In 2021, Samuel Kasumu, the most senior Black advisor in the Prime Minister's Office, resigned after disagreements surrounding a government-commissioned report on racial issues.

== See also ==
- Antisemitism in the British Conservative Party
- Islamophobia in the British Conservative Party
- Antisemitism in the British Labour Party
- Racism in the United Kingdom
