= Self-deportation =

US and UK approach for illegal immigration

Self-deportation is an anti-immigration political policy, used mainly in the United States and the United Kingdom, that promotes the voluntary departure of immigrants from their host country. It is defined by domestic policies that make quality of life and access to jobs and public services difficult for non-citizens or illegal immigrants, and otherwise aggressive immigration policies that allow for an inadmissible person to permanently depart the host country on their own (or "self-deport") rather than face prosecution for immigration-related offenses. Self-deportation became associated with illegal immigration to the United States in the 1990s and later prominently became an official policy of the second presidency of Donald Trump in 2025.

== History in the United States ==
The term was used as early as 1984 in a People article about the European film director Roman Polanski, which referred to his "self-deporting" to escape prosecution for sexual abuse. The term gained its current association with illegal immigration in the 1990s, especially in California. In 1994, William Safire pejoratively used the term to describe California governor Pete Wilson's immigration strategy, exemplified by Proposition 187, which prevented illegal aliens from using a variety of state social services. Safire summarized the philosophy of the approach as holding that "the most cost-effective way to change behavior is to make life unbearable under present behavior." The same year, Lalo Alcaraz and Esteban Zul launched a satirical campaign involving a character named "Daniel D. Portado" (a pun on deportado, Spanish for deported), who facetiously promoted self-deportation.

As early as 2005, the far-right Center for Immigration Studies began explicitly promoting self-deportation as an immigration enforcement strategy, proposing that aggressive prosecution of border-crossing statutes and "virtual choke points" blocking non-citizen access to basic services could be used to "promote self-deportation." Ira Mehlman of the Federation for American Immigration Reform described the policy as a practical alternative to forcible mass deportation, defined by "removing incentives" like access to jobs and social services.

Republican presidential candidate Mitt Romney's argument for self-deportation during the campaign has been credited with introducing the term into mainstream political discourse. Although the policy was seen as novel or controversial by some, conservative immigration groups affirmed their support for the approach, which underpins restrictive anti-immigrant laws such as Arizona SB 1070 and Alabama HB 56. Romney's position has been credited to Kansas politician Kris Kobach, a former Romney advisor and partial author of the Arizona and Alabama bills. Kobach referred to it as a "more humane way" to force 5.5 million illegal immigrants out of the United States.

The Trump administration, particularly in its second term, has strongly encouraged the practice of self-deportation, offering $1,000, travel expenses and forgiveness of previous fines as an incentive to self-deport. Some migrants who have attempted to claim this "exit bonus" have reported difficulties including delayed, misdirected and missing payments and unresponsive contact information when attempting to resolve payment problems. Mother Jones reported that Salus Worldwide Solutions, the company awarded a US$917 million contract to manage the program, had no previous federal contract experience and was connected to a former US State Department official and one of his former colleagues, then the US Department of Homeland Security official in charge of awarding the contract. Critics have argued that the administration has used both fines and lawsuits as a "scare tactic" to encourage self-deportation.

== See also ==
- Immigration reduction in the United States
- Immigration reform
- Home Office hostile environment policy
