= Dexter Bristol =

Dexter Bristol (1960–31 March 2018) was a Grenadian citizen and member of the Windrush generation who emigrated to the United Kingdom in 1968 at the age of eight to join his mother Sentine Bristol, a Grenadian British subject passport holder who was working in the NHS as a nurse.

In 2016, Bristol was denied benefit payments due to lack of documentation. In 2017, he was dismissed from his job as a cleaner because he could not produce a British passport, rendering him destitute. Bristol collapsed and died on 31 March 2018 at the age of 57. His mother directly attributed his death to his struggle with the Home Office regarding his immigration status.

His treatment and death was described by his MP David Lammy as "a tragedy". Jeremy Corbyn, the Leader of the Opposition, said that "[Bristol's mother] argued, powerfully and convincingly, that this is racism. He was the victim of [British Government] policies." Grenadian Prime Minister Keith Mitchell said, regarding Bristol's death, that "no amount of compensation can deal with pain". The poet Benjamin Zephaniah was quoted as saying “I’d like to see heads roll, but how do you compensate somebody like the mother of Dexter Bristol?”

On 28 August 2018 an inquest at St Pancras Coroner's Court, concluded that Bristol had died of natural causes, namely "acute cardiac arrhythmia", though the coroner acknowledged that stress had been a factor in his death. Bristol's family walked out of the inquest following the coroner's refusal to allow that the UK Home Office should be named as an "interested party" to the inquest. The family had sought to have the Home Office's role in his death examined by the coroner's inquest. Bristol had not accessed NHS healthcare since August 2016, believing himself to be ineligible because of his immigration status.

== See also ==
- Home Office hostile environment policy
- Windrush scandal
