= Windrush scandal =

2018 British political scandal

The Windrush scandal was a British political scandal that began in 2018 concerning people who were wrongly detained, denied legal rights, threatened with deportation, and in at least 83 cases wrongly deported from the UK by the Home Office. Many of those affected had been born British subjects and had arrived in the UK before 1973, particularly from Caribbean countries, as members of the "Windrush generation" (so named after the Empire Windrush, the ship that brought one of the first groups of West Indian migrants to the UK in 1948).

As well as those who were deported, an unknown number were detained, lost their jobs or homes, or were denied benefits or medical care to which they were entitled. A number of long-term UK residents were refused re-entry to the UK; a larger number were threatened with immediate deportation by the Home Office. Linked by commentators to the "hostile environment policy" instituted by Theresa May during her time as Home Secretary, the scandal led to the resignation of Amber Rudd as Home Secretary in April 2018 and the appointment of Sajid Javid as her successor. The scandal also prompted a wider debate about British immigration policy and Home Office practice.

The March 2020 independent Windrush Lessons Learned Review, conducted by the inspector of constabulary Wendy Williams, concluded that the Home Office had shown "ignorance and thoughtlessness" and that what had happened had been "foreseeable and avoidable". It further found that immigration regulations were tightened "with complete disregard for the Windrush generation" and that officials had made "irrational" demands for multiple documents to establish residency rights.

Despite a compensation scheme being announced in December 2018, by November 2021, only an estimated 5 per cent of victims had received any compensation and 23 of those eligible had died before receiving payments. Three separate Parliamentary committees had issued reports during 2021 criticising Home Office slowness and ineffectiveness in providing redress to victims and calling for the scheme to be taken out of the hands of the Home Office.

== Background ==
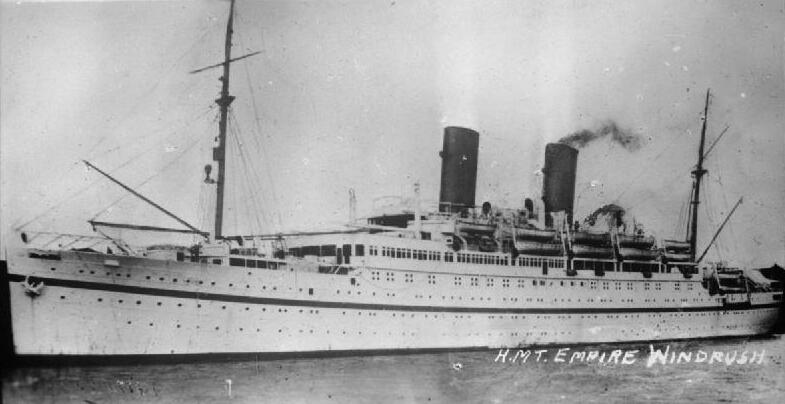
HMT Empire Windrush after which the Windrush generation is named

The British Nationality Act 1948 gave Citizen of the United Kingdom and Colonies (CUKC) status and the consequent right of settlement in the UK to everyone who was at that time a British subject by virtue of having been born in a British colony. The act and encouragement from British government campaigns in Caribbean countries led to a wave of immigration. Between 1948 and 1970, nearly half a million people moved from the Caribbean to Britain, which in 1948 faced severe labour shortages in the wake of the Second World War. Those who came to the UK around this time were later referred to as "the Windrush generation". Working age adults and many children travelled from the Caribbean to join parents or grandparents in the UK or travelled with their parents without their own passports.

Having a legal right to come to the UK, they neither needed nor were given any documents upon entry to the UK, nor following changes in immigration laws in the early 1970s. Many worked or attended schools in the UK without any official documentary record of their having done so, other than the same records as any UK-born citizen.

Many of the countries from which the migrants had come became independent of the UK after 1948, thereby making those migrants citizens of the countries they formerly resided in. Legislative measures in the 1960s and early 1970s limited the rights of citizens of these former colonies, now members of the Commonwealth, to come to or work in the UK. Anyone who had arrived in the UK from a Commonwealth country before 1973 was granted an automatic right permanently to remain, unless they left the UK for more than two years. Since the right was automatic, many people in this category were never given, or asked to provide, documentary evidence of their right to remain at the time or over the next forty years, during which many continued to live and work in the UK, believing themselves to be British.

The Immigration and Asylum Act 1999 specifically protected long-standing residents of the UK from Commonwealth countries from enforced removal. This provision was not transferred to 2014 immigration legislation because Commonwealth citizens living in the UK before 1 January 1973 were "adequately protected from removal", according to a Home Office spokesperson.

=== Hostile environment policy ===
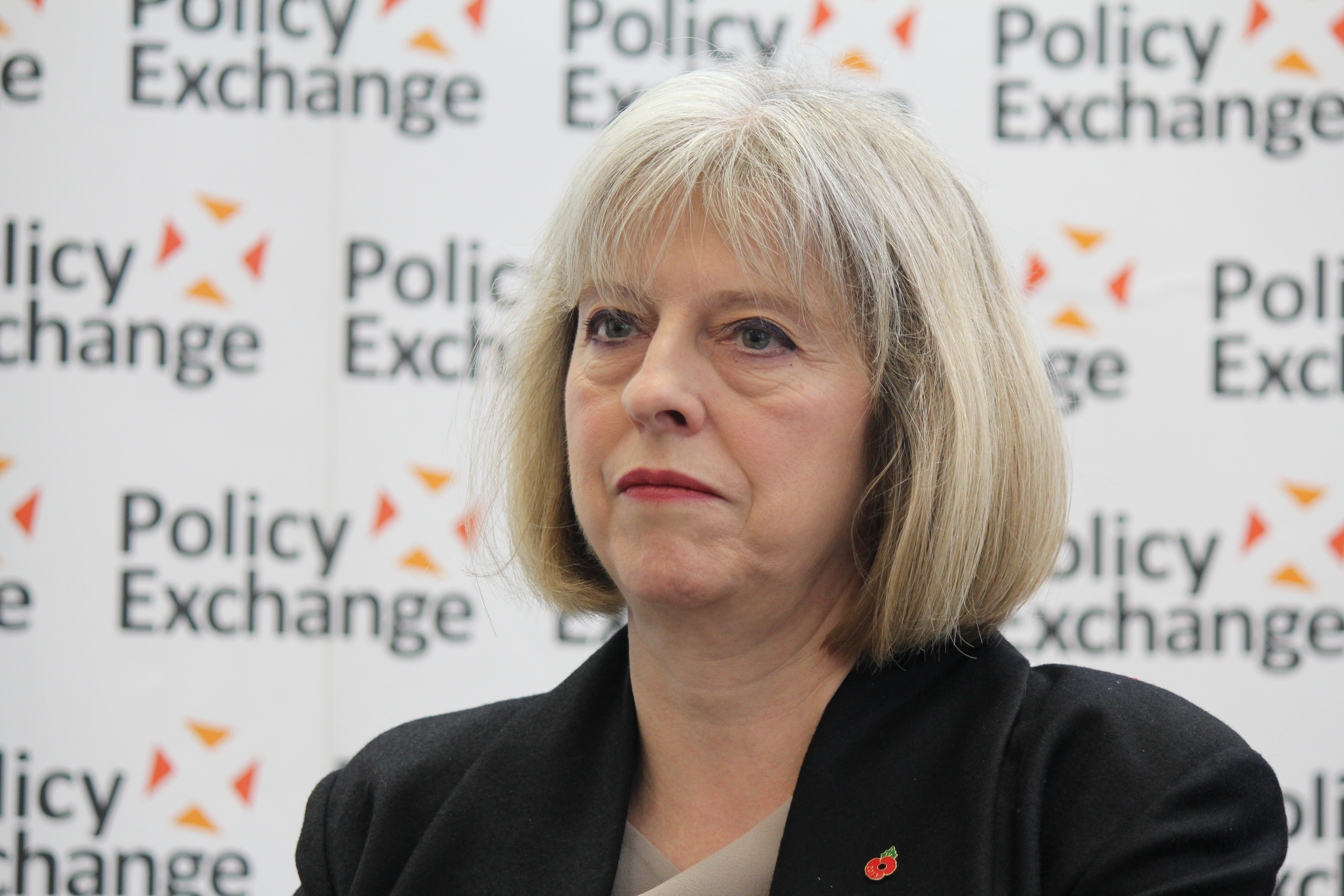
In 2012 (photo 2013), Home Secretary Theresa May introduced the hostile environment policy.

The hostile environment policy, which came into effect in October 2012, comprises administrative and legislative measures to make staying in the United Kingdom as difficult as possible for people without leave to remain in the hope that they may "voluntarily leave". In 2012, Home Secretary Theresa May said the aim was to create "a really hostile environment for illegal immigrants". The policy was widely seen as part of a strategy of reducing UK immigration to the levels promised in the 2010 Conservative Party Election Manifesto. It introduced measures including a legal requirement for landlords, employers, the NHS, charities, community interest companies and banks to carry out ID checks and to refuse services to individuals unable to prove legal residence in the UK. Landlords, employers and others are liable to fines of up to £10,000 if they fail to comply with these measures.

The policy led to a more complicated application process for "leave to remain" and encouraged voluntary deportation. The policy coincided with sharp increases in Home Office fees for processing leave to remain, naturalisation and registration of citizenship applications. The BBC reported that the Home Office had made a profit of more than £800 million from nationality services between 2011 and 2017.

The term "hostile environment" had first been used under the Brown Government. On 25 April 2018, in answer to questions in Parliament during the Windrush scandal, then Prime Minister Theresa May said the hostile-environment policy would remain government policy.

In June 2020, Britain's human rights watchdog, the Equality and Human Rights Commission (EHRC), launched a legal action to review the "hostile environment" immigration policy and to assess whether the Home Office had complied with its equality duties (as outlined in the Equality Act 2010). The EHRC planned to develop recommendations by September 2020. In November 2020, the EHRC said that the Home Office had broken the law by failing to obey public-sector equality duties by not considering how its policies affected black members of the Windrush generation.

In August 2023, May stated in her memoirs that she did regret using the term 'hostile environment' but laid the blame for the Windrush scandal itself on the failure of "successive governments".

== Initial warnings ==
The Home Office received warnings from 2013 onwards that many Windrush generation residents were being treated as illegal immigrants and that older Caribbean-born people were being targeted. The Refugee and Migrant Centre in Wolverhampton said their caseworkers were seeing hundreds of people receiving letters from Capita, the Home Office's contractor, telling them that they had no right to be in the UK, some of whom were told to arrange to leave the UK at once. Roughly half the letters went to people who already had leave to remain or were in the process of formalising their immigration status. Caseworkers had warned the Home Office directly and also through local MPs of these cases since 2013. People considered illegal were sometimes losing their jobs or homes as a consequence of having benefits cut off and some had been refused medical care under the National Health Service, some placed in detention centres as preparation for their deportation, some deported or refused the right to return to the UK from abroad.

In 2013 Caribbean leaders had put the deportations on the agenda at the Commonwealth meeting in Sri Lanka and in April 2016 Caribbean governments told Philip Hammond, the UK Foreign Secretary, that people who had spent most of their lives in the UK were facing deportation and their concerns were passed on at the time to the Home Office. Shortly before the Commonwealth Heads of Government Meeting in April 2018, twelve Caribbean countries made a formal request for a meeting with the British Prime Minister to discuss the issue, which was rejected by Downing Street.

=== Home Affairs Select Committee report ===
In January 2018, the Home Affairs Select Committee issued a report that said the hostile environment policies were "unclear" and had seen too many people threatened with deportation based on "inaccurate and untested" information. The report warned that the errors being made, in one instance 10 per cent, threatened to undermine the "credibility of the system". A major concern voiced in the report was that the Home Office did not have means to evaluate the effectiveness of its hostile environment provisions and commented that there had been a "failure" to understand the effects of the policy. The report also noted that a shortage of accurate data about the scale of illegal immigration had allowed public anxiety about the issue to "grow unchecked", which, the report said, showed government "indifference" towards an issue of "high public interest".

A month before the report was published, more than 60 MPs, academics and campaign groups wrote an open letter to Amber Rudd urging the Government to halt the "inhumane" policy, citing the Home Office's "poor track record" of dealing with complaints and appeals in a timely manner.

=== Press reports ===
From November 2017, newspapers reported that the British government had threatened to deport people from Commonwealth territories who had arrived in the UK before 1973 if they could not prove their right to remain in the UK. Although they were primarily identified as the "Windrush generation" and mainly from the Caribbean, it was estimated in April 2018 on figures provided by the Migration Observatory at the University of Oxford that up to 57,000 Commonwealth migrants could be affected, of whom 15,000 were from Jamaica. In addition to those from the Caribbean, cases of people affected who had been born in Kenya, Cyprus, Canada and Sierra Leone were identified in the press.

The press coverage accused Home Office agencies of operating a "guilty until proven innocent" and "deport first, appeal later" regime; of targeting the weakest groups, particularly those from the Caribbean; of inhumanely applying regulations by cutting off access to jobs, services and bank accounts while cases were still being investigated; of losing large numbers of original documents that proved right to remain; of making unreasonable demands for documentary proof – in some instances, elderly people had been asked for four documents for each year they had lived in the UK; and of leaving people stranded outside the UK because of British administrative errors or intransigence and denial of medical treatment. Other cases covered in the press involved adults born in the UK, whose parents were "Windrush" immigrants and who had been threatened with deportation and had their rights removed, because they were unable to prove that their parents were legally in the UK at the time of their birth.

The Home Office and British government were further accused of having known about the negative impacts that the "hostile environment policy" was having on Windrush immigrants since as early as 2013 and of having done nothing to remedy them.

Those highlighting the issue included journalists Amelia Gentleman and Gary Younge, Caribbean diplomats Kevin Isaac, Seth George Ramocan and Guy Hewitt, and British politicians Herman Ouseley and David Lammy MP. Amelia Gentleman of The Guardian was later awarded the 2018 Paul Foot Award for her coverage of what the judges described as "the catastrophic consequences for a group of elderly Commonwealth-born citizens who were told they were illegal immigrants, despite having lived in the UK for around 50 years".

== Parliament ==
In early March 2018, questions began to be asked in Parliament about individual cases that had been highlighted in the press. On 14 March, when Opposition Leader Jeremy Corbyn asked May about an individual who had been refused medical treatment under the NHS during Prime Minister's Questions in the House of Commons, May initially said she was "unaware of the case", but later agreed to "look into it". Parliament thereafter continued to be involved in what was increasingly being referred to as "the Windrush scandal".

On 16 April 2018, David Lammy MP challenged Amber Rudd in the House of Commons to give numbers as to how many had lost their jobs or homes, been denied medical care, or been detained or deported wrongly. Lammy called on Rudd to apologise for the threats of deportation and called it a "day of national shame", blaming the problems on the government's "hostile environment policy". Rudd replied that she did not know of any, but would attempt to verify that. In late April, Rudd faced increasing calls for her to resign and for the Government to abandon the "hostile environment policy". There were also calls for the Home Office to reduce fees for immigration services.

On 2 May 2018, the opposition Labour Party introduced a motion in the House of Commons seeking to force the government to release documents to the Home Affairs Select Committee concerning its handling of cases involving people who came to the UK from Commonwealth countries between 1948 and the 1970s. The motion was defeated by 316 votes to 221.

=== Targets ===
On 25 April, in answer to a question put to her by the Home Affairs Select Committee about deportation targets (i.e. specific numbers to meet), Rudd said she was unaware of such targets, saying "that's not how we operate", although another witness had discussed deportation targets. The following day, Rudd admitted in Parliament that targets had existed, but characterised them as "local targets for internal performance management" only, not "specific removal targets". She also claimed that she had been unaware of them and promised that they would be scrapped.

Two days later, The Guardian published a leaked memo that had been copied to Rudd's office. The memo said that the department had set "a target of achieving 12,800 enforced returns in 2017–18" and "we have exceeded our target of assisted returns". The memo added that progress had been made towards "the 10% increased performance on enforced returns, which we promised the Home Secretary earlier this year". Rudd responded by saying she had never seen the leaked memo, "although it was copied to my office, as many documents are".

The New Statesman said that the leaked memo gave "in specific detail the targets set by the Home Office for the number of people to be removed from the United Kingdom. It suggests that Rudd misled MPs on at least one occasion". Diane Abbott MP called for Rudd's resignation: "Amber Rudd either failed to read this memo and has no clear understanding of the policies in her own department, or she has misled Parliament and the British people." Abbott also said, "The danger is that [the] very broad target put pressure on Home Office officials to bundle Jamaican grandmothers into detention centres".

On 29 April 2018, The Guardian published a private letter from Rudd to Theresa May, dated January 2017, in which Rudd wrote of an "ambitious but deliverable" target for an increase in the enforced deportation of immigrants.

=== Change of Home Secretary ===
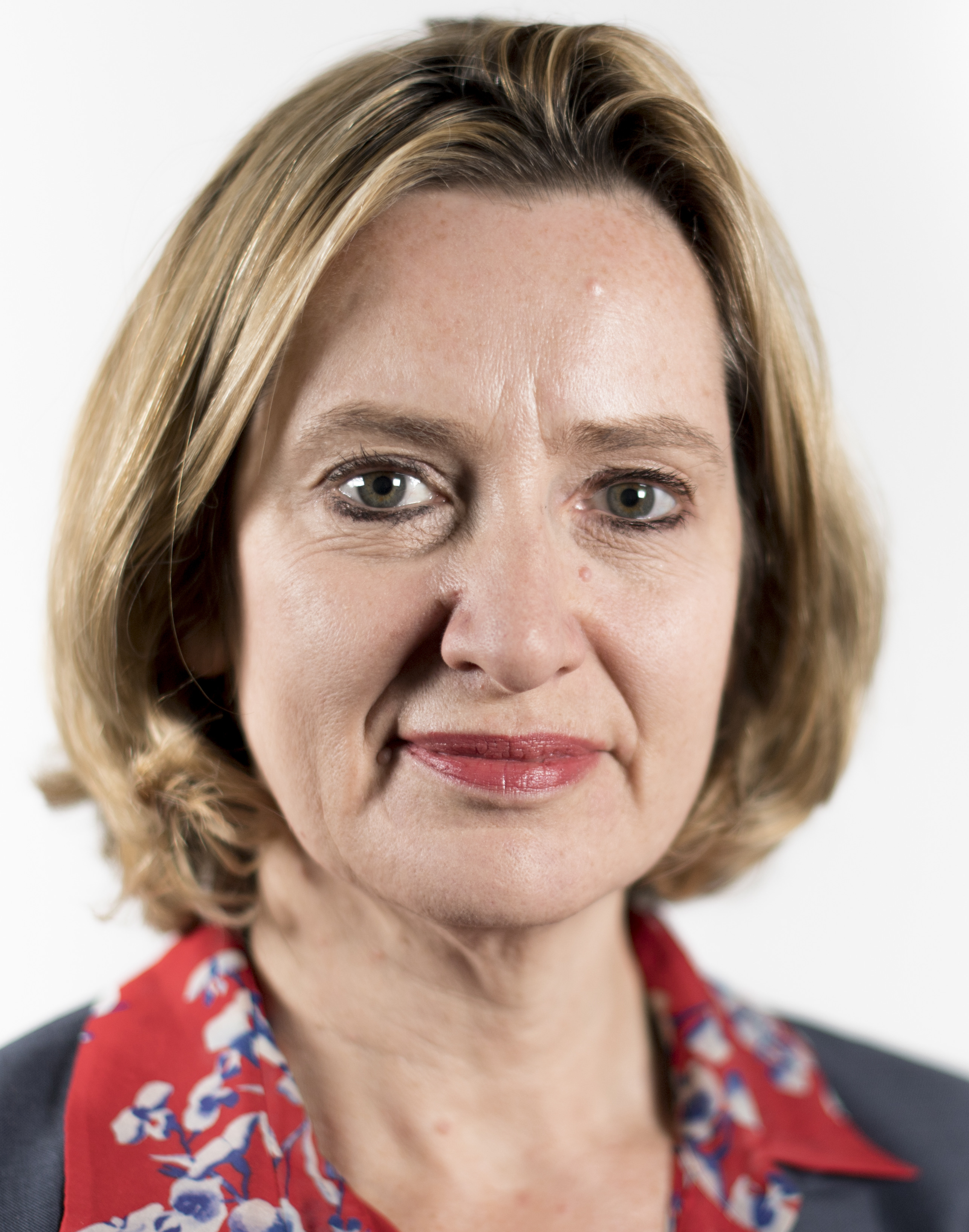
Amber Rudd resigned as Home Secretary in April 2018 in connection with the scandal.

Later the same day (29 April 2018), Rudd resigned as Home Secretary, saying in her resignation letter that she had "inadvertently misled the Home Affairs Select Committee ... on the issue of illegal immigration". Later that day, Sajid Javid was named as her successor.

Shortly before, Javid, while still Communities Secretary, had said in a Sunday Telegraph interview, "I was really concerned when I first started hearing and reading about some of the issues ... My parents came to this country ... just like the Windrush generation ... When I heard about the Windrush issue I thought, 'That could be my mum, it could be my dad, it could be my uncle... it could be me.'"

On 30 April, Javid made his first appearance before Parliament as Home Secretary. He promised legislation to ensure the rights of those affected and said that the government would "do right by the Windrush generation". In comments seen by the press as distancing himself from Theresa May, Javid told Parliament that "I don't like the phrase hostile ... I think it is a phrase that is unhelpful and it doesn't represent our values as a country".

On 15 May 2018, Javid told the Home Affairs Select Committee that 63 people had thus far been identified as having been possibly wrongly deported, though stating the figure was provisional and could rise. He also said that he had been unable to establish at that point how many Windrush cases had been wrongfully detained.

By late May 2018, the government had contacted three out of the 63 people possibly wrongly deported, and on 8 June, Seth George Ramocan, the Jamaican high commissioner in London said he had still not received either the numbers or the names of those people the Home Office believed they had wrongly deported to Jamaica, so that Jamaican records could be checked for contact details. By late June, long delays were being reported in processing "leave to remain" applications due to the large numbers of people contacting the Home Office. The Windrush hotline had recorded 19,000 calls up to that time, 6,800 of which were identified as potential Windrush cases. Sixteen hundred people had by then been issued documentation after having appointments with the Home Office.

Following complaints by ministers, the Home Office was reported in April 2018 to have set up an inquiry to investigate where the leaked documents that led to Rudd's departure came from.

=== Parliamentary committees ===
==== Human Rights committee report ====
On 29 June 2018, the parliamentary Human Rights Select committee published a "damning" report on the exercise of powers by immigration officials. MPs and peers concluded in the report that there had been "systemic failures" and rejected the Home Office description of "a series of mistakes" as not "credible or sufficient". The report concluded that the Home Office demonstrated a "wholly incorrect approach to case-handling and to depriving people of their liberty", and urged the Home Secretary to take action against the "human rights violations" occurring in his department. The committee had examined the cases of two people who had both twice been detained by the Home Office, whose detentions the report described as "simply unlawful" and whose treatment was described as "shocking". The committee sought to examine 60 other cases.

Harriet Harman MP, the chair of the committee, accused immigration officials of being "out of control", and the Home Office of being a "law unto itself". Harman commented that "protections and safeguards have been whittled away until what we can see now ... [is] that the Home Office is all powerful and human rights have been totally extinguished." Adding that "even when they're getting it wrong and even when all the evidence is there on their own files showing that they have no right to lock these people up, they go ahead and do it."

==== Home Affairs Select Committee report ====
On 3 July 2018, the HASC published a critical report which said that unless the Home Office was overhauled the scandal would "happen again, for another group of people". The report found that "a change in culture in the Home Office over recent years" had led to an environment in which applicants had been "forced to follow processes that appear designed to set them up to fail". The report questioned whether the hostile environment should continue in its current form, commenting that "rebranding it as the 'compliant' environment is a meaningless response to genuine concerns". (Sajid Javid had previously referred to the policy as the 'compliant' environment policy).

The report recommended that the Home Office should re-assess all hostile environment policies to evaluate their "efficacy, fairness, impact (both intended and unintended consequences) and value for money", as the policy placed "a huge administrative burden and cost on many parts of society, without any clear evidence of its effectiveness, but with numerous examples of mistakes made and significant distress caused".

The report made a series of recommendations designed to give the "Home Office a more human face". It also called for "passport fees to be abolished for Windrush citizens; for a return to face-to-face immigration interviews; for immigration appeal rights and legal aid to be reinstated; and for the net migration target to be dropped".

The report commented that they had hoped to uncover the extent of the impact on the Windrush generation, but that the government had "not been able to answer many of our questions ... and we have not had access to internal Home Office papers". It said that it was "unacceptable that the Home Office still cannot tell us the number of people who have been unlawfully detained, were told to report to Home Office centres, who lost their jobs, or were denied medical treatment or other services."

The report also recommended extending the government compensation scheme to recognise "emotional distress as well as financial harm" and that the scheme should be open to Windrush children and grandchildren who had been adversely affected. The report reiterated its call for an immediate hardship fund for those in acute financial difficulty. Committee chair Yvette Cooper said the decision to delay hardship payments was "very troubling" and victims "should not have to struggle with debts while they are waiting for the compensation scheme".

The report also said that Home Office officials should have been aware of, and addressed, the problem much earlier. Cross-party MPs on the committee noted that the Home Office had taken no action during the months in which the issue had been highlighted in the press.

The Labour Party responded to the report by saying that "many questions remained unanswered by the Home Office". Shadow Home Secretary Diane Abbott said it was a "disgrace" that the government had not yet published "a clear plan for compensation" for Windrush cases and that it had refused to institute a hardship fund, "even for people who have been made homeless or unemployed by their policies".

==== Home Office replies ====
In response to questions from Parliamentary select committees, and questions asked in Parliament, the Home Office issued a number of replies during the scandal.

On 28 June 2018, a letter to the HASC from the Home Office reported that it had "mistakenly detained" 850 people in the five years between 2012 and 2017. In the same five-year period, the Home Office had paid compensation of more than £21m for wrongful detention. Compensation payments varied between £1 and £120,000; an unknown number of these detentions were Windrush cases. The letter also acknowledged that 23 per cent of staff working within immigration enforcement had received performance bonuses, and that some staff had been set "personal objectives" "linked to targets to achieve enforced removals" on which bonus payments were made.

Figures released on 5 June by immigration minister Caroline Nokes revealed that in the 12 months prior to March 2018, 991 seats had been booked on commercial flights by the Home Office to remove people to the Caribbean who were suspected of being in the UK illegally. The 991 figure was not necessarily the number of deportations, as some removals may not have happened, and others may have involved multiple tickets for one person's flights. The figures did not say how many of the tickets booked were used for deportations. Nokes also said that in the two-year period from 2015 to 2017, the government had spent £52m on all deportation flights, including £17.7m on charter flights. Costs for the 12 months prior to March 2018 were not available.

In November 2018, in a monthly update to the Home Affairs Select Committee, Javid said there were 83 cases in which it had already been confirmed that people had been wrongfully deported, and officials feared there might be a further 81. At least 11 deportees had subsequently died.

== National Audit Office report ==
In a report published in December 2018, the UK's National Audit Office found that the Home Office "failed to protect [the] rights to live, work and access services" of the Windrush scandal victims, had ignored warnings of the impending scandal, which had been raised up to four years earlier, and had still not adequately addressed the scandal.

== Resumption of deportations ==
Public outcry against the deportations caused them to be paused in 2018. However, in February 2019 it emerged that the Home Office intended to resume deportations. The news led to renewed outcries against the Home Office.

On 5 February 2019, Javid claimed that all of the people due to be deported were guilty of "very serious crimes ... like rape and murder, firearms offences and drug-trafficking", but the claim was rebutted by the Home Office and was criticised by commentators as inaccurate and potentially detrimental to the futures of the deportees.

On 21 February 2019, the Jamaican High Commissioner to the UK called for a halt to deportations to Jamaica until the Home Office had published its investigation into the Windrush scandal.

== Redress for victims ==
Amber Rudd, while still Home Secretary, apologised for the "appalling" treatment of the Windrush generation. On 23 April 2018, Rudd announced that compensation would be given to those affected and fees and language tests for citizenship applicants would be waived for this group in the future. Theresa May also apologised for the "anxiety caused" at a meeting with 12 Caribbean leaders, though she was unable to tell them "definitively" whether anyone had been wrongly deported. May also promised that those affected would no longer need to rely on providing formal documents to prove their history of residency in the UK, nor would they incur costs in getting necessary papers.

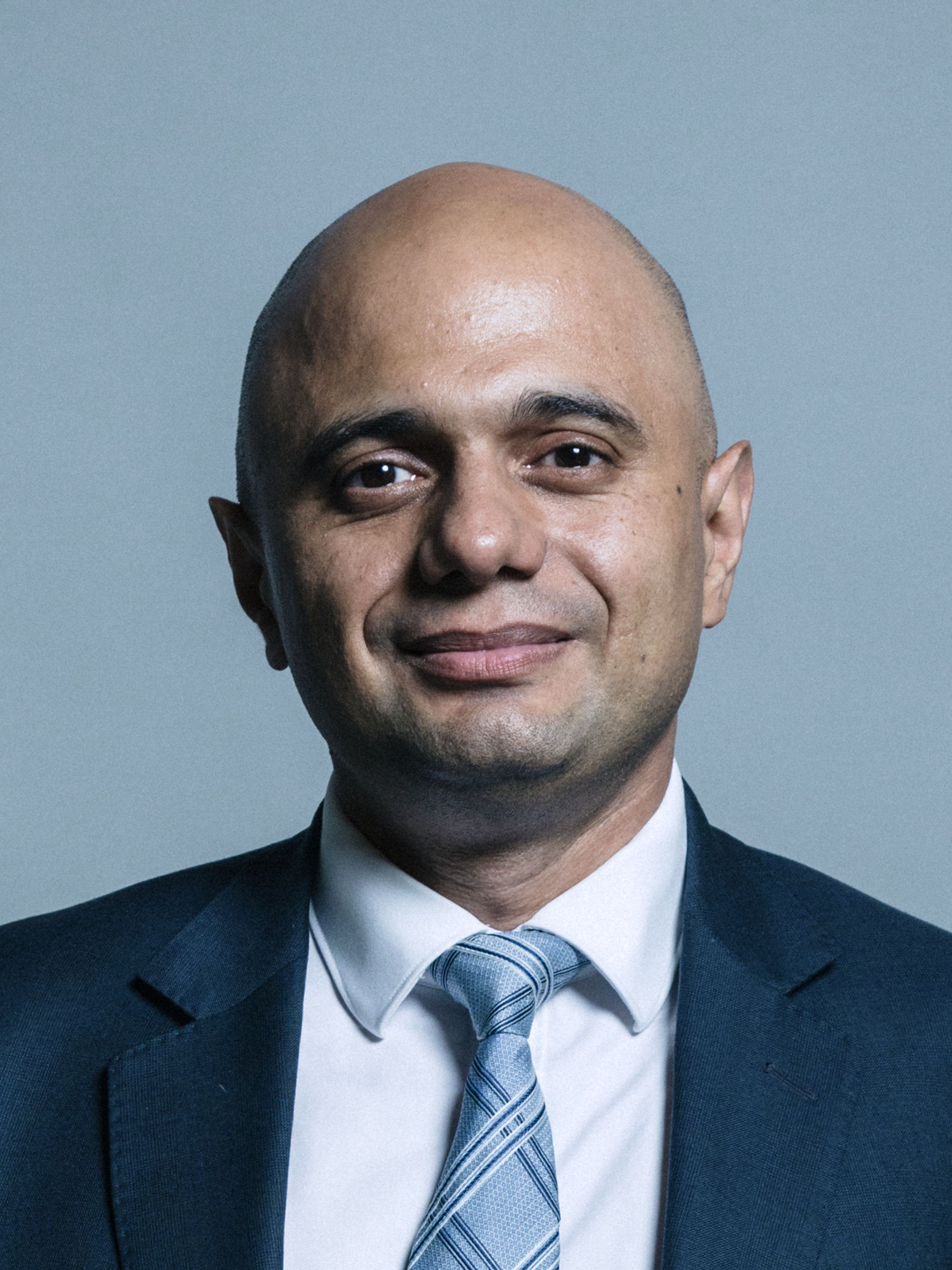
Sajid Javid replaced Amber Rudd as Home Secretary in May 2018, and aimed to address the injustices of the scandal.

On 24 May, Sajid Javid, the new Home Secretary, outlined a series of measures to process citizenship applications for people affected by the scandal. The measures included free citizenship applications for children who joined their parents in the UK when they were under 18 and for children born in the UK of Windrush parents, and free confirmation of right to remain for those entitled to it but currently outside the UK, subject to normal good character requirements. The measures were criticised by MPs, as they provided no right of appeal or review of decisions. Yvette Cooper, chair of the Commons Home Affairs Committee, said: "Given the history of this, how can anyone trust Home Office not to make further mistakes? If the Home Secretary is confident that senior caseworkers will be making good decisions in Windrush cases, he has nothing to fear about appeals and reviews." Javid also said that a Home Office team had identified 500 potential cases thus far. In subsequent weeks, Javid also promised to provide figures on how many people had been wrongly detained and indicated that he did not believe in quantified targets for removals.

On 21 May 2018, it was reported that many Windrush victims were still destitute, sleeping rough or on the sofas of friends and relatives while waiting for Home Office action. Many could not afford to travel to Home Office appointments if they got them. David Lammy MP described it as "yet another failure in a litany of abject failures that Windrush citizens are being left homeless and hungry on the streets." In late May and early June, there were calls from MPs for a hardship fund to be set up to meet urgent needs. By late June, it was reported that the government's two-week deadline for resolving cases had been repeatedly breached, and that many of the most serious cases still had not been addressed. Jamaican High Commissioner Seth George Ramocan said: "There has been an effort to correct the situation now that it has become so very open and public."

In August 2018 a compensation plan had still not been implemented. Examples cited included, a man who was still homeless while waiting for a decision; a former NHS nurse, Sharon, who told a caseworker, "I am not allowed to work, I have no benefits. I have a 12-year-old child." The caseworker replied, "Well I'm afraid these are the immigration rules, ... but obviously the Home Office point of view [is] if you don't have a legal status in the UK you're not entitled to work or study." Satbir Singh of the Joint Council for the Welfare of Immigrants stated: "It's appalling that the Home Office effectively told Sharon to go and beg for food, when there are laws requiring the state to act in the best interests of children, and provide financial support to children facing destitution." Also in August 2018, a caseworker for David Lammy, said: "We have referred 25 constituents to the Windrush taskforce in total. Only three have been granted their citizenship so far, and the others are left in a strange limbo ... We still have some people who have not even got biometric residence permits and we alerted the Home Office to these people months ago."

=== Hardship and compensation schemes ===
In February 2019, the Home Office admitted that, although it had set up a hardship scheme in December 2018 for victims of the scandal, only one of the applicants to the scheme had thus far received any assistance. Also, the compensation scheme promised by the Home Office in April 2018 was still not in place in February 2019.

In February 2020, government ministers were told that the number of people wrongly classified as illegal immigrants could be much greater than previously thought and that as many as 15,000 people could be eligible for compensation. Despite this, only 36 people's compensation claims had thus far been settled and only £62,198 has been paid out from a Home Office compensation pot that was expected to distribute between £200m and £570m.

By April 2020, the Windrush taskforce, which was set up to deal with applications from people who were wrongly categorised as illegal immigrants, still had 3,720 outstanding cases. Of these, 1,111 cases had yet to be considered, over 150 cases had waited for more than six months, and 35 had waited for longer than a year for a response. The Home Office revealed that it had thus far identified 164 people from Caribbean countries whom it had wrongly detained or deported. Twenty-four people who had been wrongly deported had died before the UK government had been able to contact them, 14 people who had been wrongly deported to the Caribbean, had thus far not been traced. Officials refused to attempt to trace people who had been wrongly deported to non-Caribbean Commonwealth countries. Up to that date, 35 people had been granted "urgent and exceptional support" payments, totalling £46,795.

By October 2020, nine victims had died without receiving their compensation; many others had yet to receive compensation.

In November 2021, a report from the cross-party Home Affairs Select Committee found that the number of victims who had died without receiving compensation was at least 23 and only an estimated 5 per cent of Windrush victims had received compensation. Despite initial Home Office estimates of about 15,000 people being eligible, as of the end of September 2021, only 864 people had received any compensation. The Home Affairs Committee report identified a "litany of flaws in the design and operation" of the compensation scheme, including an excessive burden on claimants to provide documentary evidence of the losses they suffered, long delays in processing applications and making payments, inadequate staffing of the scheme and a failure to provide urgent and exceptional payments to those in desperate need. It was "staggering" that the Home Office had failed to prepare for, resource and staff the Windrush compensation scheme before its launch, the report noted.

Other reports in 2021 from the National Audit Office, the Public Accounts Committee and the legal charity JUSTICE had all criticised the slowness and ineffectiveness of the compensation scheme and recommended that the scheme be taken out of the hands of the Home Office.

In June 2022, Home office figures showed that 7 per cent of its original anticipated 15,000 claimants, and 25 per cent of actual claimants had received any compensation up to that date. A further 25 per cent of claims had been processed and rejected.

In April 2023, Human Rights Watch reported that the compensation scheme was still failing victims, among whom HRW reported there was a strong consensus that the scheme “was designed to fail the people who were supposed to benefit from it.”

As of June 2024, the Home Office had paid out £88.6m in compensation to people affected and more than 17,100 people had been given documentation confirming their status or British citizenship.

At the 2025 Windrush National Organisation Conference held in Birmingham, Mike Tapp MP, Parliamentary Under-Secretary of State (Minister for Migration and Citizenship), announced an overhaul of the Windrush compensation scheme, including age-based prioritisation for those 75 and over, the inclusion of all immigration application fees and occupational & private pension losses, and a new advanced payment option of up to 75%.

== Denial of citizenship ==
In 2021, the UK High Court ruled that the Home Office had acted illegally when they had denied citizenship to people whose only reason for not fulfilling the continuous residency requirement for British citizenship, was that they had been wrongly deported or denied re-entry to Britain. In a test case brought by two Windrush victims, one of whom had lived in London for 43 years having arrived as a six-year-old in 1962, but was prevented from returning to the UK from a trip to Jamaica and had spent 13 years there destitute before being allowed to return to the UK as a result of the scandal becoming public. It was not known how many of the 11,000 Windrush citizenship refusals the ruling would affect.

== Landing cards ==
The only official records of the arrival of many "Windrush" immigrants in the 1950s through to the early 1970s were landing cards collected as they disembarked from ships in UK ports. In subsequent decades, these cards were routinely used by British immigration officials to verify dates of arrival for borderline immigration cases. In 2009, those landing cards were earmarked for destruction as part of a broader clean up of paper records. The decision to destroy was taken under the then-Labour government, but implemented in 2010 under the incoming coalition government. Whistleblowers and retired immigration officers claimed that they had warned managers in 2010 of the problems this would cause for some immigrants who had no other record of their arrival. During the scandal, there was discussion as to whether the destruction of the landing cards had negatively impacted Windrush immigrants.

== Broader immigration ==
The scandal drew attention to other issues relating to UK migration policy and practice, including treatment of other migrants, and of asylum seekers and what the status of EU nationals living in Britain would be after Brexit.

Stephen Hale of Refugee Action said, "All of the things those [Windrush] people have been through are also experiences that people are going through as result of asylum system". Some skilled workers had been threatened with deportation after living and working in the UK for over a decade because of minor irregularities in their tax returns; some were allowed to stay and fight deportation but prevented from working and denied access to the NHS while doing so. Sometimes the irregularities were due to the tax authorities, not the migrant.

In an interview with the BBC's Andrew Marr on 3 June 2018, Sajid Javid said that key parts of the UK's immigration policy would be reviewed and that changes had already been made to the "hostile environment" approach to illegal immigration in the wake of the Windrush scandal.

== Caribbean reactions ==
- Antigua and Barbuda: Prime Minister Gaston Browne told Sky News' All Out Politics that an apology from the British government over the Windrush issue "would be welcome". He said it had been a major concern, but that he was pleased the government had stepped in. "We have had at least one Antiguan who incidentally has a British passport, who was apparently identified for deportation on the basis that he had no original documents. He came here about 59-years ago as an infant with his parents, and would have been on his parents' passport. Many of these individuals do not have any connection with the country of their birth, would have lived in the UK their entire lives and worked very hard towards the advancement of the UK."
- Barbados: High Commissioner the Rev. Guy Hewitt said on 16 April the "Windrush Kids" who went to schools in Britain and paid their taxes were being "treated as illegal immigrants" and "shut out of the system", with some deported or sent to detention centres. Hewitt also advised people not to contact the Home Office unless they first notified their representative or lawyer, as too many people doing so had been detained. During interviews in March 2021, Hewitt referred to the scandal and said it was time to move away from an "oppressive and racist colonial past". In Hewitt's view, many believe that the "monarchy symbolizes part of that historic oppression" and the country was due for "a native born citizen as head of state".
- Grenada: Prime Minister Keith Mitchell said that those affected were owed "serious compensation".
- Jamaica: Prime Minister Andrew Holness said on 18 April: "my interest is to ensure that the Windrush generation and the children of the Windrush generation get justice. We have to call it out for what it is, but we also have to ensure that those who have been deported get access to a process that gets them back. They should get access to all the benefits that their citizenship will entitle them to. If there was an acceptance that a wrong was done, then there should be a process of restoration. I'm certain that the robust civil society and democracy that you have will come up with a process of compensation."
- Saint Kitts and Nevis: High Commissioner Kevin Isaac helped coordinate Caribbean high commissioners to speak in a single voice on the Windrush issue from 2014.

== Windrush Lessons Learned Review ==
On 19 March 2020, the Home Office released the Windrush Lessons Learned Review. This study, described by the Home Secretary as "long-awaited", was an independent inquiry managed and conducted by Wendy Williams, an inspector of constabulary. The report concluded that the Home Office showed an inexcusable "ignorance and thoughtlessnes", and that what had happened had been "foreseeable and avoidable". It further found that immigration regulations were tightened "with complete disregard for the Windrush generation", and that officials had made "irrational" demands for multiple documents to establish residency rights. The study recommended a full review of the "hostile environment" immigration policy.

In March 2022, a progress report on the Learned Review concluded that the Home Office has broken pledges to transform its culture after the Windrush inquiry, warning that the scandal could be repeated. The report was also critical of the failure to review the effectiveness of the hostile environment policies – now known as "compliant environment" policies and of the slowness of the compensation scheme. A small poll of applicants for compensation found that 97% did not trust the Home Office to deliver on its commitments.

== Sitting in Limbo ==
In June 2020, BBC Television screened an 85-minute, one-off drama, Sitting in Limbo, starring Patrick Robinson as Anthony Bryan, who was caught up in the effects of the hostile environment policy.

== See also ==
- Dexter Bristol, a Grenadian citizen who died while destitute as a result of losing his job because of the Home Office hostile environment policy
- Paulette Wilson, who was one of the first cases covered in British media, who went on to become an activist working for other victims of the scandal
- Windrush Day
- National Windrush Monument
