= Sitting in Limbo (2020 film) =

2020 British television drama film

- Written by: Stephen S. Thompson
- Directed by: Stella Corradi
- Starring: Patrick Robinson; Nadine Marshall; Pippa Bennett-Warner; Jay Simpson; Sarah Woodward
- Country of origin: United Kingdom
- Original language: English

Production
- Running time: 86 minutes
- Production company: Left Bank Pictures

Original release
- Network: BBC One
- Release: 8 June 2020

Sitting in Limbo is a 2020 British factual drama television film about the Windrush scandal. The story focuses on the real-life experiences of a Jamaican-born British man, Anthony Bryan, one of the victims of the UK Home Office hostile environment policy on immigration. Bryan had lived in the UK for 50 years when his life was upended as a result of the Home Office mistakenly classifying him as an illegal immigrant.

Sitting in Limbo was written by Bryan's half-brother, novelist Stephen S. Thompson, and stars Patrick Robinson, Nadine Marshall, Pippa Bennett-Warner, Jay Simpson and Sarah Woodward. The film was broadcast on 8 June 2020 on BBC One.

Jimmy Cliff's song "Sitting in Limbo", from his 1971 album Another Cycle, played over the closing credits.

As of October 2021, the film holds a 100% approval rating on Rotten Tomatoes, based on eight reviews with an average rating of 8/10.

The programme won the British Academy Television Award for Best Single Drama at the 2021 British Academy Television Awards.
