= Right to rent =

UK Government policy

Right to Rent is the name given to a UK Government policy contained in the Immigration Act 2016 whereby landlords in England are required to check the immigration status of tenants they rent properties to, and deny lodgings to those who cannot prove they are permitted to live in a rented home.

The policy makes it a crime in England for anyone to provide lodgings of a tenancy nature to individuals without the right to rent. Landlords must report prospective tenants to government authorities if documentation is inadequate, and must also monitor when a (legally permitted) tenant’s documentation expires while a tenancy is ongoing.

Right to Rent is widely described as one of several measures in the UK's Hostile Environment policy.

== Initial rollout ==
The pilot was responsible for finding 109 individuals who were in the United Kingdom illegally.

The scheme was subsequently extended to all of England.

== Court ruling against the policy ==
On 1 March 2019 the scheme was ruled to be incompatible with human rights by the High Court of Justice in a case brought by the Joint Council for the Welfare of Immigrants.

As a result of the High Court ruling, the restrictions have not been extended to Wales, Scotland or Northern Ireland as of March 2020. However they remain in effect throughout England.

The Court of Appeal partially upheld this ruling, finding that the Right to Rent scheme makes it harder for BME people and minorities to rent a home - perhaps taking twice as long for BME people and migrants to find a home to rent compared to a white British person. However, the Court stopped short of finding Right to Rent violated human rights law. They leave it to MPs and the Government to decide whether the racial discrimination is ‘greater than envisaged’.

Permission to appeal this decision at the Supreme Court was denied. An application to appeal the decision will be made to the European Court of Human Rights.

== Criticism ==
Right to Rent has been criticised for discrimination against ethnic minority groups. The trade publication Inside Housing published an article showing that the pilot of right to rent resulted in some landlords being more reluctant to rent to those from minority groups due to the possibility of being fined.

The UK government published a 21-page booklet 'A short guide on right to rent' for landlords in July 2019. The 2025 update reflects the most current rules, digital options, and clarifications to reduce the burden on landlords.

The Residential Landlords Association (RLA) are heavily critical of the above July 2019 guidance, maintaining that this "New guidance from the government on its Right to Rent scheme would see landlords breaking the law if they followed it".

== See also ==
- Property in the United Kingdom
- Home Office hostile environment policy
