= Zionism is Racism (motion) =

2026 Green Party of England and Wales policy motion

Green Party of England and Wales
- Passed by: Green Party of England and Wales
- Passed: 4 October 2026
- Introduced by: Lubna Speitan
- Voting summary: 1,022 voted for; 813 voted against

Zionism is Racism is a policy motion adopted by the Green Party of England and Wales on 4 October 2026 which designates Zionism as racism and calls for a one-state solution in the Israeli–Palestinian conflict.

The resolution was opposed by most Green members of Parliament. The party's leader, Zack Polanski, did not vote on the motion, as he was campaigning in the Holborn and St Pancras by-election, but has supported changes to the motion. The prime minister and leader of the Labour Party, Andy Burnham, called the motion "antisemitic" and said the Labour Party would not enter into any partnership with the Green Party. The accusation has been denied by the Green Party and Jewish groups from both inside and outside the party. A Green Party spokesperson criticised the Labour government for conflating criticism of Israel with antisemitism in response to Burnham.

== Background ==
In 1975 the United Nations General Assembly passed Resolution 3379, which stated that Zionism is a form of racism and racial discrimination. The resolution was revoked in 1991 after the United States applied political pressure. The first World Conference on Women, held in 1975, issued a declaration that characterised Zionism as a form of racial discrimination. Jewish Voice for Peace says that Zionism establishes a "racist hierarchy with European Jews at the top", and it rejects the "colonial ideology" of Zionism's founders.

A June-July 2025 poll by the Institute for Jewish Policy Research (JPR) found that 64% of British Jews identify as Zionist, 13% as non-Zionist and 12% as anti-Zionist, with Zionist identification having remained stable but anti-Zionist identification having grown from 8% polled in 2022 and rising to 24% among Jews aged 20–29. The JPR's report on the poll also noted that among British Jews, "significant minorities appear to be questioning foundational Zionist ideas." As of 2021, those who identified as Jewish made up 0.5% of the population of England and Wales.

A July 2026 poll by YouGov for the Council for Arab-British Understanding found that 50% of British people believed Israel was committing genocide in Gaza and only 17% said Israel was not committing genocide.

== Motion ==
On 4 October 2026 the Green Party annual conference at the Brighton Centre adopted a resolution calling for "the establishment of a single democratic Palestinian State in all of historic Palestine ... with equal rights for all", and defining Zionism as support for "an ethnonationalist Jewish State in historic Palestine to the exclusion and/or domination of the non-Jewish population". The motion concludes that "Zionism is racism" because it "privileges one ethnic group on the basis of the subjugation of others".

The motion passed by 1,022 votes to 813. The votes in favour equate to 0.4% of the total membership of the party. Conference attendees voted down an amendment that would have prevented party members from being pressured, proscribed or disciplined "based on affiliation with Jewish community institutions" that take a Zionist stance, including synagogues.

The motion was proposed by Lubna Speitan, a British-Palestinian artist. Speitan said that Zionism should be "treated as any other form of racism". Speitan said: "The whole point of this motion is for us to challenge and confront the establishment. It doesn't matter what the leadership thinks ... It's about us, the members, getting in and forcing their hand." Speitan had joined the Green Party within the prior year, having formerly been a member of Your Party. She has argued that Hamas should not be proscribed as a terror group.

As a result of the motion, the Greens became the first major UK party to regard Zionism as a form of racism and to support a one-state solution to the Israeli–Palestinian conflict.

An Opinium poll released on 10 October 2026 found that, out of 91 respondents who identified as supporting the Greens and who answered the question about their support for the anti-Zionist motion, 74 respondents approved its adoption and 17 opposed. However, they could not agree if this move by the Green party set the priorities right. Voters for other parties were much more sceptical. Labour voters were somewhat opposed to it on the balance (90 supports, 145 disapprovals); Liberal Democrat respondents rejected it at an over 2-to-1 ratio, while support among people preferring the Conservatives or Reform UK was marginal. Young voters (18–34 years old) were the only age group where favourable opinions outnumbered unfavourable ones; the support decreased drastically with age, and fell to just 6% among the old-age pensioners.

== Reception ==
=== Within the party ===
==== Before the vote ====
Before the conference debate, Green Party leader Zack Polanski called for the motion to be amended to safeguard Jewish members and to remove the call for a single state. Polanski was not at the conference when the motion was discussed as he was campaigning in the Holborn and St Pancras by-election in which he was the Green candidate. He did not vote on the motion, and the amendment on Jewish members was defeated. In an interview with Mehdi Hasan in September, Polanski said: "I think ultimately what [the motion] does is create a distraction and a conversation where both the party and pro-Palestinian activists and anyone who cares about peace and justice can be attacked."

Four of the five Green Party MPs (Adrian Ramsay, Ellie Chowns, Carla Denyer and Siân Berry) opposed the motion. The fifth, Hannah Spencer, abstained.

Speaking at conference, the party's former leader Caroline Lucas said: "I urge you not to support the over-simplification at the heart of this motion – a refusal to accept complexities which is leading to so many Jewish members feeling scared and unwelcome in our party."

The motion was endorsed by the prominent Holocaust survivor and activist Stephen Kapos, who said "Zionism both as an ideology and practice is harmful and has no legitimacy and must be rejected". The Jewish Greens group did not take a stance on the motion because its membership was divided on the issue. A member survey found strong support among Jewish Greens for the party's pro-Palestinian position, but concern about the effect the motion would have on the party overall.

Ashok Kumar, a member who supported the motion, said it was not possible to sit on the fence on the issue of Palestinian oppression and that he did not believe the motion would change any voting intentions, adding "I'd much rather us be a party with strong politics, a democratic tradition, polling between 10-14%."

==== After the vote ====
Ramsay, a former co-leader of the party, said he was "deeply upset" by the adoption of the motion, which he said "doesn't reflect long-standing Green principles". In a New Statesman op-ed, Lucas, who opposed the motion, wrote that "asking all Jewish people to deny the historical realities that might explain their own families' attachment to Israel as a sanctuary is not an ask our movement should or needs to make", and warned against the tendency to "deal only in zero-sum binaries". Lucas said the Green Party was vulnerable to political entryism.

Sandy Ruthven, the Green candidate for the 2021 Bristol mayoral election and chair of Amnesty International UK's charitable trust, resigned from the party following the vote, and accused the party of not fighting antisemitism. Eight Green councillors resigned from the party in protest against the resolution. (Note: Christina Coleman (Maresfield and Buxted, East Sussex County Council).; Daniel Potter (Orwell, Babergh District Council).; Danny Lee (Central Meon Valley, Winchester City Council).; Drew Creek (Trenance, Cornwall Council).; Kevin Foster (Hipswell and Colburn, North Yorkshire Council).; Kieran Dams (Waterloo, Sefton Council).; Liz Sahu (Castle, Leicester City Council).; Malcolm Wallace (Central Meon Valley, Winchester City Council).) After Polanski came second in the Holborn and St Pancras by-election on 8 October, Lucas told BBC Newsnight that he had failed to show leadership over the motion. The chair of the Jewish Greens, Vivien Lichtenstein, called for Polanski to resign, adding it was a "big mistake" for him to have dodged the debate at the party conference. However, while the Jewish Greens themselves were divided on the motion, the group made a statement after the vote stating that neither the policy nor the party are antisemitic and that the Green Party is a welcoming and safe place for Jews. Polanski said that he would have voted for the amended motion but not for the motion in its unamended form, and expressed a wish to revise the motion "at the earliest possible opportunity".

The Green Party launched an investigation into motion's proposer, Lubna Speitan, after it became known that she had a connection to convicted al-Qaeda member Minh Quang Pham, had suggested that Zionists should be "hunted in the same way as the Nazi aggressors were", and had said that she would be happy to be labelled an "antisemitic Hamas terrorist".

On 11 October, Polanski wrote in The Guardian that it was not right for the motion to reject a two-state solution, or for the British government or the Green Party to try to decide the future for Israelis and Palestinians. He stated that, as someone who grew up in a Zionist household, the substance of the motion was consistent with his understanding of Zionism as the ideology that "underpins the displacement and genocide of Palestinians". He wrote that "a narrow focus on definitions is neither desirable nor strategic", because Zionism is not easily defined, and that "for many Jewish people it is bound up with identity, safety and belonging".

=== Domestic ===
Prime Minister Andy Burnham condemned the motion as antisemitic. The Labour Party and the Liberal Democrats ruled out entering into any future coalition government with the Green Party, with the Labour Party withdrawing from power-sharing agreements in 11 councils.

Several Labour and Liberal Democrat MPs reported the Green Party to the Equality and Human Rights Commission (EHRC) regarding the motion. On 15 October, the EHRC wrote to the party seeking information about the motion and its practical effects. The regulator said "many Jewish people will be feeling vulnerable", but it needed more details to assess if any parts of it could be considered discriminatory under the Equality Act 2010.

The British Chief Rabbi, Ephraim Mirvis, condemned the motion as "poisonous antisemitism" and a "threat to British Jews and to Britain", and the Board of Deputies of British Jews said the Greens had become "an extremist party".

The Labour Party leader of Brighton & Hove City Council, Bella Sankey, told the BBC she was considering barring the Greens from holding future conferences in Brighton Centre as a result of the motion.

Jewish Voice for Liberation released a statement saying that they "reject the accusations that the resolution is antisemitic and are appalled but not surprised by the media pile up against both the Green Party and its Jewish leader, Zack Polanski". It said that the motion called for "a single multi-ethnic state".

A 7–10 October Opinium poll found that 35% of the public thought the Green Party was wrong to pass the motion, 16% that it was right, 16% that it was neither right nor wrong, and 33% did not know. Among 2024 Green voters, 37% thought it was right, 25% wrong, 17% neither, and 21% did not know.

=== International ===
The motion attracted an unusual level of international attention for a party conference motion.

The European Green Party released a statement distancing itself from the motion. It condemned "in the strongest terms the genocide against Palestinians", but said that the motion was incompatible with their position of a two-state solution.

The Israeli Foreign Ministry said that the Greens turned themselves into a body that supports terror. Israel's Foreign Ministry banned Polanski from entering Israel, although Polanski had not taken part in the vote.

Felix Banaszak, leader of the German party Alliance 90/The Greens, called the resolution "intolerable and unacceptable". A Green Party source said the stance of the German Green Party was not surprising given it had "support[ed] arming Israel, opposed a ceasefire to Israel's onslaught on Gaza, backed the suspension of funding to UNRWA and co-sponsored a Bundestag resolution describing the arguments and methods of the peaceful, Palestinian-led BDS campaign as antisemitic".

Academic and professor, Joseph Massad, who specialises in Middle Eastern studies, agreed that Zionism is racism, saying it is "simply stating historical fact".

== See also ==
- Antisemitism in the Green Party of England and Wales
- Greens for Palestine
