= Islamophobia in the British Conservative Party =

Allegations of Islamophobia in the UK Conservative Party have been made, including against senior politicians, such as Boris Johnson, Michael Gove and Zac Goldsmith. Baroness Warsi, former co-chair of the Conservative Party, said in 2018 that anti-Muslim prejudice had "poisoned" the party. Many Muslim party members welcomed Warsi's comments, saying that they felt the issue had been marginalised within the party.

In 2019, the prime minister Boris Johnson ordered a report into how the party dealt with accusations of Islamophobia and racism. The final report, released in May 2021, said that anti-Muslim views were seen at local association and individual levels, that comments made by Goldsmith and Johnson "give an impression to some of a party and leadership insensitive to Muslim communities" and that the Conservatives' complaints team was "in need of overhaul", but denied that the party was institutionally racist.

== Background ==
Islamophobia as a topic of specific analysis "first entered the British political space" following the publication of Islamophobia: A Challenge for us all by the Runnymede Trust on behalf of the Commission on British Muslims and Islamophobia, published in 1997 to coincide with the election of Tony Blair's New Labour government (1997–2010). Although the Human Rights Act 1998 and Equality and Human Rights Commission (both originating under New Labour) protected freedom of religion, Islamophobia was rarely discussed or called out as a specific area of concern in the New Labour years, especially following 9/11.

== Incidents ==
=== 2000s ===
In October 2001, former prime minister Lady Margaret Thatcher was accused of Islamophobia when she said "I have not heard enough condemnation [of 9/11] from Muslim priests". Zaki Badawi, then chairman of the Imams and Mosques Council said Thatcher "has always been detached from minority communities. That statement from a person of her stature will give encouragement to extremists to harass our community further". Baroness Pola Uddin said Thatcher was "completely out of touch with reality. Perhaps she's forgotten that when they were part of the mojahedin, she was one of the Taliban's best international champions" and Gurbux Singh, chairman of the Commission for Racial Equality, urged Thatcher to "speak with care and dignity", adding "Those who criticise the response of Muslim leaders are either unaware of the strength of their condemnation or have been misled by the media exposure given to one or two extremists."

Conservative politician Michael Gove's 2006 book on the supposed roots of Islamist extremism, Celsius 7/7, was criticised when it was published for "holding apparent hostile opinions towards Muslims", according to Richard Vaughan in the i.

=== 2010 election ===
Baroness Sayeeda Warsi (then co-chair of the Conservative Party) prioritised combating middle-class Islamophobia in her famous "dinner-table" speech, which said that Islamophobia has "passed the dinner table test" (i.e. that such prejudice was acceptable in polite company). This led the Coalition to support the creation of an All-Party Parliamentary Group on Islamophobia, and establish the Cross-Government Working Group on Anti-Muslim Hatred. However, the decision to use 'Anti-Muslim Hate', rather than 'Islamophobia' for the Working Group was in response to a report by the Quilliam Foundation, who said that Islamophobia had been exploited by "Islamists and Wahhabis", and using such a term would be a "propaganda coup" to these individuals. No evidence exists to substantiate Quilliam's claims.

=== Mayoral campaigns (2012–2016) ===
In 2012, Lynton Crosby was reported as saying that Boris Johnson's mayoral campaign should not get try to gain support from "fucking Muslims", instead focusing on wavering voters in the outer suburbs.

In 2016, the Conservative Party faced criticism for running a supposedly Islamophobic campaign promoting Zac Goldsmith for London mayor by smearing Labour's mayoral candidate, Sadiq Khan, also under the direction of Crosby as election strategist. Concerns were first raised that Goldsmith's campaign was attempting to divide communities after flyers targeting Hindu voters suggested Khan would implement a tax on jewellery. As the campaign progressed, Goldsmith questioned Khan's associations with alleged extremists before he became an MP. Prime Minister David Cameron used parliamentary privilege to link Khan to Suliman Gani, who Cameron alleged was a supporter of the terrorist Islamic State of Iraq and the Levant (ISIL) or the Islamic State. Gani was in fact a Conservative supporter who opposed the terror group and instead was a supporter of an Islamic state based on Islamic principles. Cameron later apologised for the slur, and former Defence Secretary Michael Fallon also apologised and paid compensation for making similar remarks about Gani.

Senior Conservatives, including Baroness Warsi, former chancellor Kenneth Clarke and Andrew Boff, the Conservative group leader of the Greater London assembly condemned Goldsmith for painting Khan as an extremist and a risk to UK security. Warsi said Goldsmith should receive "mandatory diversity training" following his comments, and the Muslim Council of Britain (MCB) said the campaign was an example of Tory "dog whistle anti-Muslim racism".

Shaun Bailey, the Conservative candidate for the 2020 London mayoral election, wrote a pamphlet in 2005 for the Centre for Policy Studies complaining that immigrants to the UK being allowed to "bring their culture, their country and any problems they might have with them" and observing non-Christian festivals has turned Britain into a "crime-ridden cesspool" and "robs Britain of its community". In September 2018, he shared a tweet referring to Labour's incumbent Mayor of London Sadiq Khan as "mad mullah Khan of Londonistan".

=== 2010s ===
In 2011 Prime Minister David Cameron made a speech criticising some British Muslim groups of "passive tolerance" of extremism, saying: "some organisations that seek to present themselves as a gateway to the Muslim community are showered with public money while doing little to combat extremism. This is like turning to a rightwing fascist party to fight a violent white supremacist movement." Anti-extremist groups such as Muslims4Uk criticised Cameron's remarks, calling them "ill-judged and deeply patronising. The overwhelming majority of UK Muslims are proud to be British and are appalled by the antics of a tiny group of extremists". Sadiq Khan, then the shadow justice secretary, said the speech was tantamount to "writing propaganda for the English Defence League". Patrick Wintour said in The Guardian that "it is clear one target [of Cameron's reproach] is the Muslim Council of Britain ... His remarks suggest that a Home Office-led review into the government Prevent programme, being overseen by Lord Carlile, is going to lead to major changes. It also suggests that he has sided unambiguously with figures such as Michael Gove inside his cabinet rather than his party chairman, Lady Warsi, who has complained of fashionable Islamophobia."

Baroness Warsi said in 2018 that she had joked that Gove's views "radicalised" Cameron into pursuing anti-Muslim terror policies. Additionally, Gove's 2014 accusation of a "Trojan Horse" Islamist conspiracy in Britain's schools was criticised by Tahir Alam (head of the Park View Educational Trust at the centre of the controversy), who said Gove had a "profound mistrust of Islam".

In 2018, Conservative MP Michael Fabricant apologised for tweeting a photoshopped image depicting a balloon caricature of Sadiq Khan (mimicking the Trump baby balloon during the president's visit to the UK) having sex with a pig. The image was condemned by Hope not Hate as well as Warsi. Labour MP Wes Streeting raised the issue with the government's chief whip. No action was taken against Fabricant.

In October 2018, recently selected London Mayoral candidate Shaun Bailey was accused of Islamophobia and Hinduphobia after it was reported that had written a pamphlet in 2005, entitled No Man's Land, for the Centre for Policy Studies. In it, Bailey argued that accommodating Muslims and Hindus is one factor which "[robs] Britain of its community" and that the collapse of community is turning country into a "crime riddled cess pool". He claimed that South Asians "bring their culture, their country and any problems they might have, with them" and that this was not a problem within the black community "because we've shared a religion and in many cases a language".

In March 2019, Warsi accused Home Secretary Sajid Javid of anti-Muslim "dog-whistle politics", and claimed that members of the Conservative Party opposed his leadership ambitions as he was perceived to be "too Muslim" by senior Conservatives. That same month, Andrea Leadsom, the leader of the House of Commons, was criticised from both sides of the aisle after suggesting that addressing abuse in Britain against British Muslims was a matter for the Foreign Office.

=== Boris Johnson ===
Former Prime Minister Boris Johnson was criticised for his comments in an appendix added to a later edition of his 2005 book about the Roman empire, The Dream of Rome, which said that Islam caused the Muslim world to be "literally centuries behind" the west. Writing in a column in The Daily Telegraph in August 2018, Johnson made comments about Islamic full-face coverings (i.e. the burqa and the niqab) while criticising Denmark's decision to ban anyone from wearing a "garment that hides the face" in public places. He said women wearing them look like "letterboxes" and "bank robbers". The Equality and Human Rights Commission and Prime Minister Theresa May criticised these remarks, which led to Johnson facing an investigation by the party to determine whether his remarks breached the Tory code of conduct on Islamophobia. The MCB accused Johnson of "pandering to the far right" saying the comments were "particularly regrettable in this current climate, where Islamophobia and anti-Muslim hatred is becoming worryingly pervasive". Johnson's comments led to a number of Islamophobic messages being left on his Facebook page by his followers. At the same time, The Times revealed that "Tory councillors, officials and agents" were also found to be members of anti-Islam Facebook groups. Writing for Vox, Jennifer Williams linked Johnson's comments with wider anti-Muslim sentiment across Europe, and research by Tell MAMA in 2019 revealed that Islamophobic incidents increased 375% following the article's publication. Four cabinet ministers backed Johnson's comments and criticised May and the party leadership for a "cack-handed" investigation into his comments. In December, an independent panel led by Naomi Ellenbogen QC found that Johnson's use of language could be considered provocative but was not contrary to the party rules, which did not "override an individual's right to freedom of expression". The panel said it would be "unwise to censor excessively the language of party representatives or the use of satire to emphasise a viewpoint, particularly a viewpoint that is not subject to criticism".

=== Rejecting motion of censure against Viktor Orban (2018) ===
In 2018, following Conservative MEPs support of the Hungarian leader Viktor Orbán against a motion to censure him in the European Parliament, the Muslim Council of Britain said the Conservative Party was giving "bigotry a free pass" and viewing the rights of minorities, including Muslims, as "expendable as support is sought for the government's Brexit position". Conservative sources told The Independent that the opposition to the vote was to gain "brownie points" from Orban's regime to make him more amenable to a post-Brexit trade deal. The Conservatives were the only governing conservative party in western Europe to vote against the censure.

The Board of Deputies of British Jews accused the Conservative government of defending Hungary's "appalling track record" of "vivid antisemitism" and Islamophobia, saying: "we are very alarmed by the messages at the heart of Orban's election campaign, including his comments about 'Muslim invaders', calling migrants poison, and the vivid antisemitism in the relentless campaign against Jewish philanthropist George Soros". Only one Conservative MEP voted in favour of the motion (Baroness Mobarik), with two abstentions (Charles Tannock and Sajjad Karim).

=== Appointment of Roger Scruton (2018) ===
In 2018, the government announced conservative philosopher Roger Scruton to be its housing adviser. Scruton described Islamophobia as a "propaganda word" in his 2017 book Conservatism: Ideas in Profile, saying "There has been in official circles a deliberate silencing of discussion, a refusal to describe things by their proper names, and the adoption of the propaganda word 'Islamophobia' to create a wholly imaginary enemy." The government issued a statement in support of the professor and denied all accusations of Islamophobia.

In April 2019 the government announced Scruton had been dismissed from this role, after an interview was released where he stated that Islamophobia was "invented by the Muslim Brotherhood in order to stop discussion of a major issue", as well as further comments relating to George Soros that the government described as "unacceptable". Scruton's colleague Douglas Murray obtained a full recording of the interview, which suggested that the article had omitted relevant context. Two months later, the New Statesman officially apologised and Scruton was re-appointed as co-chair of the commission.

=== Local level and membership (2016–2020) ===
In 2016, Ben Bradley (then a Conservative councillor in Nottinghamshire) defended Conservative councillor Michael Murphy – who had shared a string of anti-Muslim memes on Facebook one year previously – as an "honest" man who "says what he thinks". Bradley was suspended from the party in June 2018 and reinstated in March 2019.

Leader of the Conservative group in North Lanarkshire Council, Stephen Goldsack, was reported to a watchdog following alleged Islamophobia in his comments regarding a planning application for a mosque. He was subsequently expelled from the Conservative Party in May 2018 after it was revealed that he had previously been affiliated with the far-right British National Party prior to being a Conservative. In 2018, Conservative activist and former candidate Kishan Devani joined the Liberal Democrats in response to an "uncomfortable lurch to the right" in the party which caused the Islamophobia scandal.

In March 2019, it emerged that Martyn York, a Conservative councillor for Wellingborough, and Dorinda Bailey, a former Conservative Party council candidate, had facilitated or supported Islamophobic Facebook comments, including calls for mosques to be bombed. York was suspended from the party, and Bailey did not remain a member. In the same month, Peter Lamb (parliamentary candidate for the Staple Tye ward of Harlow District Council) left the party (despite being reinstated as a candidate) after it emerged that he had tweeted in 2015: "Islam [is] like alcoholism, the first step to recovery is admit you have a problem", "Turkey buys oil from ISIS. Muslims sticking together ... Do they want us to call ISIS Daesh now so that we don't associate them with Islam?" Also in March, 14 Conservative Party members were expelled after they were found to have posted Islamophobic comments in a pro-Jacob Rees-Mogg Facebook group; Conservative chairman Brandon Lewis was aware of offensive posts 5 months before the suspensions took place. 25 Conservative activists on the same group were suspended following anti-Muslim comments on Facebook: one activist posted a comment about committing mass murder against Muslims in a mosque; others had shared content from the far-right anti-Islam British National Party and called for the sinking of migrant ships. Len Milner and Chris Smith of the East Staffordshire council also quit the party in March after they liked a cartoon on Facebook which depicted a mock beheading of London mayor Sadiq Khan.

Lewis wrote to all officials in March 2019 on the issue of Islamophobia when it had emerged that Andrew Bowles (then leader of Swale Borough Council in Kent) was suspended following his sharing of a post describing far-right leader Tommy Robinson as a "patriot" following the latter's suspension from Instagram and Facebook for violating community guidelines. Later that month, 15 councillors suspended for Islamophobic or racist comments were reinstated.

In June 2020 a Conservative activist, Theordora Dickinson, was suspended from the party after telling a Muslim Labour MP to 'go back to Pakistan'. An LSE study released a few months later, in which was measured local government officials' responsiveness to email correspondence, Lee Crawfurd and Ukasha Ramli found that 'bias against both Muslim and Jewish names is greater from Conservative Party councillors than Labour Party councillors'.

=== Nus Ghani dismissal comments (2022) ===
In 2022, Nus Ghani said she was dismissed as a transport minister in 2020 because she was a Muslim. She said that a government whip had told her that, in the Downing Street meeting that decided her removal, her "Muslimness was raised as an issue" and that her "Muslim woman minister status was making colleagues feel uncomfortable". Chief whip, Mark Spencer, came forward as the person who spoke to Ghani and said the allegations are untrue. Justice Secretary and Deputy Prime Minister Dominic Raab said the allegations were serious and called on Ghani to make a formal complaint in order to allow an investigation to take place.

== 2021 Racism and Islamophobia inquiry ==
=== Calls for an independent inquiry ===
In May 2018, the Muslim Council of Britain (MCB) wrote to Conservative chairman Brandon Lewis, urging an independent inquiry into Islamophobia in the Conservative Party, the publication of a list of Islamophobic incidents and the adoption of "a programme of education and training" on anti-Muslim prejudices within the party. This MCB listed numerous examples of Conservative Islamophobia; most notable of these was by Tory MP Bob Blackman. He hosted events attended by Hindu nationalist Tapan Ghosh noted for what Labour MP Naz Shah refers to as "abhorrent views" on Muslims. The MCB also listed nine incidents and said there were "more than weekly incidents" of Conservative candidates and representatives displaying anti-Muslim prejudice. The MCB argued these were the "tip of the iceberg" of Islamophobia in the Tory party.

This call was supported by Baroness Sayeeda Warsi, Baron Mohamed Sheikh, Mohammed Amin (chairman of the Conservative Muslim Forum), and 350 mosques and 11 umbrella organisations across the UK.

The MCB said the level of prejudice within the party was "astonishing" and that "We've seen MPs, councillors and members engage in bigotry that should have no place in a modern Conservative Party. Yet the constructive call by Muslim communities for an independent inquiry into the issue has been ignored again and again. Instead we hear excuses, denials and the responses we would expect when there is an institutional problem." In response, Justice Secretary David Gauke said "Where there is evidence, we take action ... That is what the Conservative Party does and will continue to do. So I don't accept that criticism." Dismayed with the response of Lewis and May, in 2019 Warsi wrote to the party's chief executive, Mick Davis, urging him to "show leadership" on the issue.

In 2019, the prime minister Boris Johnson ordered a report into how the party dealt with accusations of Islamophobia and other accounts of internal racism, under pressure from Sajid Javid during the 2019 Conservative Party leadership election; this was broadened out from an initial commitment to an Islamophobia inquiry.

=== Report publication ===
The final report, released in May 2021, said that anti-Muslim views were seen at local association and individual levels; that two-thirds of all incidents reported to the Conservative Party's main complaints team related to Islamophobic incidents, and three-quarters of all incidents recorded in the Conservatives' complaints database involved social media; that comments made by Zac Goldsmith against Sadiq Khan during the London mayoral campaign, as well as those made by Johnson himself in 2018, "give an impression to some of a party and leadership insensitive to Muslim communities" and that the Conservatives' complaints team was "in need of overhaul" and non-transparent. However, the report said that issues of Islamophobia were not treated differently to other issues of discrimination, and denied that the party was institutionally racist.

The report was criticised by many victims of alleged racism and Islamophobia within the Conservative Party, who argued that the inquiry was too restrictive in its scope and focused too much on the handling of complaints, rather than address any underlying issues as to why Muslims may have felt uncomfortable in the party.

== Views of members ==
A 2019 poll of Conservative party members found 69% believed "there are areas in Britain that operate under Sharia law", 45% believed "there are areas in Britain in which non-Muslims are not able to enter" and that 39% believed "Islamist terrorists reflect a widespread hostility to Britain amongst the Muslim community". 76% thought the party was already doing everything it needed to combat Islamophobia, with only 15% thinking more action was required.

Another 2019 poll found 56% of members surveyed said Islam was "generally a threat" to the British way of life, and that 42% thought having people from a wide variety of racial and cultural backgrounds has damaged British society.

== Criticism and rebuttals ==
The allegations of Islamophobia within the Conservative Party have been met with some criticisms and rebuttals, with right-wing commentators in particular questioning the authority of the MCB and the term "Islamophobia" itself. Conservative Home Secretary Sajid Javid rejected calls from the MCB for an inquiry into the party and said "The Muslim Council of Britain (MCB) does not represent Muslims in this country" and added "we don't deal with the MCB". This view was echoed by Conservative MP Kemi Badenoch who stated that the MCB had a "political motive" in pressing allegations against the party.

Author Douglas Murray, a frequent critic of Islam, who has himself been accused of Islamophobia, has described comparisons of antisemitism with allegations of Islamophobia in the Conservatives as a "false equivalence". He stated "Clearly where people have called for violence against any group of people then such people have no place in a political party. But this shaving of a dozen or so people from the Conservative ranks has been described as a cleansing of 'Islamophobia' from the party" adding that "anti-Semitism is hatred or suspicion of Jews because they are Jews. It is an irrational prejudice built on centuries of stereotypes and hatreds which culminated in the worst crime in human history, on our continent, in the last century. 'Islamophobia', by contrast, is a term which can claim almost anything that the wielder claims it to mean."

In an article titled No, Islamophobia is not the new Anti-semitism journalist and Spiked Online editor Brendan O'Neill criticised the term "Islamophobia", highlighted the past practice of the MCB of boycotting Holocaust Memorial Day in Britain, and alleged the allegations of Islamophobia were a means of deflecting attention from Antisemitism in the British Labour Party. He concluded the article with "Anti-Muslim prejudice is out there, yes. But 'Islamophobia' is an elite invention, a top-down conceit, designed to chill open discussion about religion and values and to protect one particular religion from blasphemy. The war on Islamophobia is in essence a demand for censorship."

Physician and writer Qanta A. Ahmed defended the comments made by Boris Johnson regarding full-face veils. Writing in the right-wing magazine, The Spectator she stated "As a Muslim woman observing Islam, I am fully supportive of Boris Johnson's rejection of the niqab. And I wonder how many of the former Foreign Secretary's critics understand my religion, what this form of dress represents and the subjugation it implies ... When Boris Johnson mocks the niqab, he is emphatically not mocking Muslim women because – and this is a point that we Muslims seem to be unable to get across to non-Muslims – there is no basis in Islam for the niqab."

== Opposition ==
A number of Conservative Party figures have spoken against anti-Islamic sentiment in British society and politics. Maurice Cowling, a leading conservative intellectual of the Peterhouse School described Salman Rushdie's The Satanic Verses as "a nasty, sneering, free-thinking book ... I can understand why the book is offensive and it didn't seem to me to be anything but offensive when I read it. Some thinking Moslems take a view of the nature of religion, and the incompatibility between Islam and liberalism, which runs parallel to what I'm saying in Mill and Liberalism". During the aforementioned 2013 controversy surrounding Philip Hollobone and Gerald Howarth pressing then Home Secretary Theresa May to ban the wearing of the Islamic veil, Jacob Rees-Mogg wrote an article in The Daily Telegraph entitled "Ban the burka? No, Muslim women need our protection" arguing for free choice when it comes to dress and that it is "important to defend such a minority from the tyranny of the majority."

== See also ==
- Islamophobia in the British Labour Party
- Antisemitism in the British Labour Party
- Antisemitism in the British Conservative Party
- Racism in the British Conservative Party
- Racism in the United States

== Sources ==
- Attallah, Naim Singular Encounters (London: Quartet Books, 1990).
- Allen, Chris (2017). "Political Approaches to Tackling Islamophobia: An 'Insider/Outsider' Analysis of the British Coalition Government's Approach between 2010–15". Social Sciences. 6 (3): 77. doi:10.3390/socsci6030077. hdl:2381/45599.
- Awan, Imran (2014). "Operation 'Trojan Horse': Islamophobia or Extremism?". Political Insight. 5 (2): 38–39. doi:10.1111/2041-9066.12062. ISSN 2041-9066. S2CID 144275677.
- BBC News (6 August 2018). "Johnson burka 'letter box' jibe sparks anger". BBC.
- BBC News (5 March 2019). "PM's 'head in sand' over Tory Islamophobia". BBC.
- Champion, Matthew (23 June 2016). "Michael Fallon Is Paying Damages To The Imam He Wrongly Accused Of Backing ISIS". BuzzFeed News.
- Fisher, Lucy (31 May 2018). "Muslim Council of Britain demands inquiry into Tory 'Islamophobia'". The Times.
- Geddes, Duncan (6 June 2018). "Tory Muslim chief accuses party of failing to tackle Islamophobia". The Times.
- ITV (13 July 2018). "Fabricant sorry for London Mayor 'pig balloon sex act' tweet during Trump visit". ITV News.
- Johnston, Chris (2 June 2018). "Pressure grows on May to tackle Islamophobia in Conservative party". The Guardian.
- Khan, Shehab (4 June 2018). "More than 350 mosques urge Conservatives to launch internal inquiry into Islamophobia claims". The Independent.
- Lusher, Adam (12 August 2018). "Steve Bannon's praise for Boris Johnson fuels speculation he is masterminding bid to oust Theresa May". The Independent.
- Mason, Rowena (6 May 2016a). "Zac Goldsmith attacked by senior Tory over London mayoral election tactics". The Guardian.
- Mason, Rowena (7 May 2016b). "Top Conservatives condemn Zac Goldsmith's 'disgusting' mayoral campaign". The Guardian.
- "Splits Deepen Over British Ex-Minister Johnson's Burqa Comments". The New York Times. Thame, Oxfordshire. Reuters. 12 August 2018.
- Sabbagh, Dan (4 July 2018b). "Sayeeda Warsi calls for inquiry into Islamophobia within Tory party". The Guardian.
- Stewart, Heather (11 May 2016). "David Cameron apologises after saying ex-imam 'supported Islamic State'". The Guardian.
- Vaughan, Richard (11 June 2018). "Baroness Warsi: Conservative Party 'poisoned by Islamophobia at every level'". i.
- Walker, Peter; Slawson, Nicola (31 May 2018). "Conservatives under fire for failing to tackle party's Islamophobia". The Guardian.
- Watt, Nicholas; Taylor, Matthew (22 March 2015). "Tory candidate accused of EDL plot expected to be forced out within days". The Guardian.
- Wheeler, Caroline (12 August 2018). "Boris Johnson burqa row sparks cabinet war as Steve Bannon wades in". The Sunday Times.
- Wheeler, Caroline; Walters, Tommy; Forbes, Felix (19 August 2018). "Boris Johnson's Facebook page mobbed by racists after burqa furore". The Sunday Times.
- Williams, Jennifer (10 August 2018). "Boris Johnson's offensive comments about the burqa, explained". Vox.
