= Antisemitism in the British Conservative Party =

Antisemitism in the British Conservative Party refers to allegations and incidents of antisemitism involving members and affiliates of the Conservative Party in the United Kingdom. These incidents have spanned various periods and have involved diverse forms of antisemitic expression, including stereotypes, conspiracy theories, and offensive language. The party has faced scrutiny over its handling of such incidents, with criticisms focusing on the perceived inadequacy of disciplinary measures and the prevalence of certain antisemitic tropes within its ranks. The Conservative Party has publicly condemned antisemitism and taken steps to address concerns, but the issue remains a subject of ongoing debate and controversy.

== Nineteenth century ==
=== Robert Peel (1834–1846) ===
In 1830, Robert Peel spoke in Parliament in opposition to the Bill to remove civil disabilities from Jews. During this time, a Jew could not open a shop within the city of London, become a barrister, graduate from university, or be a member of Parliament. Peel opposed 'Dechristianising the Legislature', and commented:

The Jew is not a degraded subject of the state; he is rather regarded in the light of an alien – he is excluded because he will not amalgamate with us in any of his usages or habits – he is regarded as a foreigner. In the history of the Jews... we find enough to account for the prejudice which exists against them.

=== Edward Smith-Stanley (1846–1868) ===
Prior to 1858, Jews were not allowed to become Members of Parliament (MPs) unless they embraced Christianity, such as Benjamin Disraeli who was born Jewish but became an Anglican at the age of 12. This changed with the Jews Relief Act 1858, which removed legislative barriers to Jews entering Parliament. Conservative opposition to the Act included:

- Conservative MP Robert Gascoyne-Cecil (Lord Salisbury) opposed Jewish inclusion in Parliament because, he said, a Jew, due to his religious convictions, would be opposed to "all ... [present MPs] were there to uphold", and would take a "hostile" position towards Parliament.
- George Bankes "expressed his horror at the possibility of seeing a Jew Premier [prime minister] in Parliament".
- John Pemberton Plumptre "intended no insult to the Jews in asserting that they were unfit to legislate or interfere in the affairs of a Christian nation".
- Thomas Dyke Acland and Charles Law warned that every Jew in Parliament would "displace a Christian" and accused the Jews of the City of London of conspiring to get John Russell elected and, therefore, having John Russell under their control.
- Alexander Beresford Hope opposed the bill "on the ground that there was no pre-eminence or super-excellence in the Jewish race which would justify the house in relaxing" the rules about admittance.
- Charles Newdigate Newdegate claimed that "the wealth of one distinguished Jew had been liberally lavished to obtain petitions in favour of the Bill" and that behind the calls for Jewish emancipation was a "Talmudic conspiracy... to destroy the free constitution and religion of Protestant Englishmen".
- Alexander Baillie-Cochrane saw the "apathy with which this Bill had been received in the country as no source of congratulation, but as a very terrible sign of the corruption of the times".
- Philip Stanhope was of the opinion that "Jewish emancipation would lower the tone of religious opinion in England".
- Spencer Horatio Walpole said that the Jews were of a "separate creed and interest" and were "not a citizen of this country, but of the world".
- Archibald Douglas said that Jews "were unfortunately actuated by a love of money, which was highly discreditable".
- Robert Inglis argued that Jews were "a separate nation with a separate creed".
- Henry Ker Seymer, Richard Spooner, Frederic Thesiger, Alexander Raphael, Francis Scott, Henry Goulburn, Joseph Napier, Cropley Ashley-Cooper (Lord Ashley), and Henry Home-Drummond, also opposed the bill and the inclusion of Jews.

=== Benjamin Disraeli (1868–1881) ===
Benjamin Disraeli endured prejudice from some Conservatives throughout his political career. Disraeli was described by one backbench Conservative, Sir Rainald Knightley, as "that hellish Jew", and by some others simply as "the Jew". Edward Smith-Stanley (Earl of Derby) criticised Disraeli for holding beliefs he considered un-English. Another Conservative politician said of him, "he bears the mark of the Jew strongly about him... He is evidently clever but superlatively vulgar". Writing to his sister, Austen Chamberlain said Disraeli was an "English patriot [but] not an Englishman".

=== Robert Gascoyne-Cecil, 3rd Marquess of Salisbury (1885–1902) ===
Organized antisemitism in the United Kingdom can be traced to the proto-fascist paramilitary group, the British Brothers' League (BBL), which was founded in 1901 by members of the Conservative Party, including MPs Howard Vincent and William Evans-Gordon, and drew its membership from sections of the Conservative Party. The BBL, the "largest and best organised of all the anti-alien groups" of its time was "Conservative-led and... Conservative-dominated". It sought to pressure the government into stopping the arrival of poor Jews into Britain. It was successful in that its pressure was instrumental in persuading parliament to pass the 1905 Aliens Act.

William Evans-Gordon was elected to parliament in 1900 on an anti-alien platform and began campaigning for changes to the government's immigration policies in his first year of office. Within their parliamentary work, Evans-Gordon and other Conservative MPs obscured their antisemitism within advocacy for what might have been considered a reasonable immigration policy. Within their discourse, "immigrant" and "alien" often meant "Jew". With four Conservative MPs in support at its inaugural meeting, the BBL was founded on 9 May 1901. (Note: The BBL was formed on 25 February 1901.) The next month, Walter Murry Guthrie called a meeting of East London Conservative Associations and out of this initiative another group was formed with the aim of pressuring the government to restrict immigration: the Londoners' League. The Londoners' League worked with the BBL at a lower tier and had a number of Conservative MPs and councillors as speakers, including Evans-Gordon, Samuel Ridley, Harry Samuel, Thomas Herbert Robertson, David John Morgan and Arnold White. (Note: In 1899 White had written an antisemitic book, The Modern Jew.) The BBL stirred up widespread racism against Jewish immigrants who had moved to the city to find refuge because they had been displaced by pogroms in their home countries.

On the tier above the BBL was the Parliamentary Alien Immigration Committee. The committee was founded in August 1901 and comprised all the East End MPs (except the Liberal Party MP for Whitechapel, Stuart M. Samuel). Based on the same ideas as those of the BBL, Evans-Gordon formed the committee to work within Parliament. As a parliamentary pressure group, it urged the government to pass restrictive immigration controls.

== Arthur Balfour (1902–1911) ==
=== Progress towards the Aliens Act 1905 ===
In 1902, Evans-Gordon was instrumental in setting up a Royal Commission on Alien Immigration, of which he was the chair and a "key member", submitting reports to the commission. The Royal Commission was a "Parliamentary platform against Jewish migrants" and concerned itself almost entirely with Jews. Sympathies for the BBL "stretched into the secretaryship of the Royal Commission on Alien Immigration". In February 1903, the antisemitic Immigration Reform Association (IRA) was established with Richard Hely-Hutchinson (Earl of Donoughmore) as president – a group considered respectable within the anti-alien network; and MPs who had been involved with the BBL continued their work through the Association, which played a prominent role in putting pressure on the government to pass restrictive immigration controls. Working with Harry F. Smith, a Conservative Party agent, the IRA organised a major demonstration in November 1903, with the BBL providing a procession.

In 1903, Evans-Gordon wrote The Alien Immigrant (which was an expansion of the reports he had made to the Royal Commission) with the aim of influencing public opinion on immigration. In this, he addressed the so-called "Jewish question", asserting that "the settlement of large aggregations of Hebrews in a Christian land has never been successful", and that the "Hebrew colony ... unlike any other alien colony in [Great Britain], forms a solid and permanently distinct block – a race apart, as it were, in an enduring island of extraneous thought and custom", to the extent that "east of Aldgate one walks into a foreign town".

The Royal Commission on Alien Immigration reported its findings in August 1903, which would inform the Aliens Act 1905, recommending strong, restrictive laws against alien entry into Britain. In 1904, the Conservative Home Secretary Aretas Akers-Douglas brought a bill to Parliament that would "make provision with respect to the Immigration of Aliens, and other matters incidental thereto". Within the bill, "alien" was "an implicit reference to 'the Jew"'. Evans-Gordon was a primary author of the 1904 immigration bill.

In 1905, the revised bill passed into law. Evans-Gordon's speeches were "the primary catalyst for the final passage of the 1905 Act". He became known as the "father of the Aliens Bill". The 1905 Aliens Act, while not mentioning Jews outright, appealed to racial prejudice against the Jews and was designed to stop the arrival of Eastern European Jews into Britain. The BBL had succeeded: it largely was responsible, along with its supporting MPs, for the passing of the Aliens Act 1905.

=== William Joynson-Hicks ===
In a 1908 by-election, standing against Winston Churchill (a Liberal at the time), the Conservative candidate, William Joynson-Hicks, was elected to Parliament as MP for Manchester North West. During his election campaign he took a stance against the Jews, which continued throughout his political career, announcing that "he was not going to pander for the Jewish vote. He would treat those who were Englishmen as Englishmen, but as to those who put their Jewish or foreign nationality before their English nationality, let them vote for Mr Churchill". He threw aspersions on his opponent, publicly saying Churchill's supporters were "bogus deputations going to him from a few Jews who were not even on the register".

During World War I, Joynson-Hicks associated with the ultra-nationalistic British Empire Union (formerly called the Anti-German Union). In a "strongly antisemitic" campaign, in which Jewishness and German origin were conflated, the Union demanded the internment and repatriation of "enemy aliens", many of whom were Jews.

After World War I, Joynson-Hicks questioned the trustworthiness of Anglo-Jewish MPs and civil servants. He spoke out against Sir Herbert Samuel when he was appointed High Commissioner for Palestine. Joynson-Hicks also continued his involvement in extra-parliamentary antisemitic agitation. He was involved with groups composed of a "comprehensive cross-section of anti-Jews": for example, George Clarke (Lord Sydenham), G. K. Chesterton, Nesta Webster, Rosita Forbes and Arnold White. Sir Charles Yate, George Clarke (Lord Sydenham), Henry Percy (Duke of Northumberland) and several other anti-Zionist MPs produced the publication The Conspiracy Against the British Empire, a "boiled-down version" of The Protocols of the Elders of Zion. Joynson-Hicks was in favour of self-government by "the majority in Palestine" and proposal of a resolution to that effect, which was perhaps a result of his antisemitism. At some point in his career, he commented that the Jewish immigrants to Palestine were "the sweepings of the ghettos of Central Europe". He was also involved in the hunt for "aliens", which led to many Russian Jews being expelled from Britain.

== Bonar Law (1911–1923) ==
=== National League for Clean Government ===
The National League for Clean Government was a political reform movement, created partly in response to the Marconi scandal, that directed antisemitism towards the alleged "Jewish plutocracy", which it believed was conspiring to subvert British politics. A number of its members and supporters were antisemites, including Conservative MP Rowland Hunt. At a meeting of the group in 1913, Hunt spoke about the "influence" which controlled Britain and, in a "thinly disguised reference to Jewish financiers", said, "We are really in danger of being ruled by alien votes and foreign gold... The aliens and foreign plutocrats are driving out British blood". The cartoonist David Low commented on the meeting that the audience was left with the feeling of antisemitism.

=== The Die Hards ===
After World War I, an informal group known as the Die Hards, who were united "by their national chauvinism, verging on xenophobia, and anti-Bolshevism", emerged. People associated with the group – such as Henry Percy (Duke of Northumberland), George Clarke (Lord Sydenham), and the MP's Ronald McNeill, Charles Yate, Charles Taylor Foxcroft, Joynson-Hicks and Henry Page Croft – believed in the conspiracy theory of a Jewish world effort to subvert Britain and its Empire. Jew baiting was known among them. The Die Hard ousted Edwin Montagu, the Secretary of State for India.

=== Antisemitism towards Jewish "aliens" ===
In February 1923, Charles Crook, Conservative MP for East Ham North, brought a motion to the House of Commons that it was "the utmost importance that a strict control shall be maintained over alien immigration". Crook wished to maintain the "racial integrity of Britain" and was seconded by the Conservative MP for Manchester Hulme, Joseph Nall, who particularly wanted to exclude the "alien revolutionary agitator". Crook and Nall were supported by Herbert Nield, Conservative MP for Ealing, in whose opinion Stepney had been "positively ruined by the incursion of these aliens", evidenced by the presence of advertisements and notices in Yiddish.

=== Antisemitism towards Jewish MP ===
During the 1922 general election, the sitting MP for Putney, the Conservative Samuel Samuel, was challenged by an independent Conservative candidate, Prescott Decre. Samuel saw this opposition by Decre and his supporters as "purely anti-Semitic".

== Stanley Baldwin (1923–1937) ==
Stanley Baldwin had strong ties to Joynson-Hicks, which can be seen throughout their political careers together – each vouched for the other in election campaigns; Joynson-Hicks was instrumental in the "destruction of the coalition and the old Conservative leadership which opened the way to Bonar Law and then Baldwin" and supported Baldwin in the passing of policy; they worked together in the Treasury; Baldwin promoted Joynson-Hicks to Home Secretary; and Joynson-Hicks stood by Baldwin in defeat. According to David Cesarani, Baldwin and Joynson-Hicks "shared a discourse about England and Englishness" that included a definition of "Englishness" based around "a common language, heritage and racial character", and, on the other side of the coin, a dislike of other "races", seen as "less illustrious, ... other, and 'alien'."

Baldwin became prime minister in 1923 and gave Joynson-Hicks a place in the Cabinet as Financial Secretary to the Treasury. This was "noted by the Zionist press with anxiety". In August 1923 he became Health Minister. There were also causes for concern for Anglo-Jewry in the way Baldwin's government came to power again in the 1924 general election. That election saw an "exceptionally dirty campaign" (most notoriously known for the Zinoviev letter, a forgery purportedly written by the Jewish head of the Communist International in Moscow, published by the Daily Mail to turn the electorate against the Labour party), and the Conservative campaign had a stream of anti-Jewish, anti-alienism underlying it. Now and at other times in this period, "anti-Jewish feeling was mobilized under the guise of anti-alienism, anti-Zionism and anti-Bolshevism by mainstream political figures". During the campaign, Baldwin and other Conservatives used the threat of aliens as one of their platforms. In their campaigning, the term "aliens" was "used as a code for Jews".

In speeches like his party political broadcast on 16 October, Baldwin gave the all-clear to Joynson-Hicks and other extremists in the Conservative party who had been engaged in xenophobic campaigning for decades. He said, "we cannot afford the luxury of academic socialists or revolutionary agitation ... I think its high time somebody said to Russia "Hands off England" ... I want to examine the laws and regulations as to entry of aliens into this country, for in these days no alien should be substituted for one of our own people when we have not enough work at home to go around". Baldwin's allies could now exploit prejudices against foreigners, "aliens" and "agitators". For Joynson-Hicks, the concept of "alien" and "communist" blended, and throughout his political career his "anti-alienism, his anti-Zionism, [and] his anti-communism all brought him into conflict with the Jews".

=== Home Secretary Joynson-Hicks ===
After the Conservatives won the election, in November 1924, Baldwin made Joynson-Hicks Home Secretary (he was Home Secretary until 1929). David Cesarani ascribes this "sudden [and] unexpected" political ascent – which, "in the view of many at the time and since, [was] undeserved in terms of talent" – to the ideological affinity between Baldwin and Joynson-Hicks. Joynson-Hick's appointment worried the Jewish community, and not without reasons: his time as Home Secretary saw him in regular conflict with British Jews. Joynson-Hicks became known as "Mussolini Minor". His antisemitism caused him no harm during his time in office and he was emboldened in his antisemitism because he knew he had the general support of the Conservative party, "the large majority of whom are anti-alien in the sense of generally disliking foreigners, and despising anyone who does not happen to have been born in this country with a long English lineage to boot". More specifically, too, the Conservative party contained a "very noisy and active element" of antisemites. "[A]nti-Jewish currents were evident at the centre of politics, even present at the Cabinet table". Writing to a friend shortly after the 1924 election, Chaim Weizmann commented, "There is a new government ... the Cabinet contains two or three reactionaries, anti-Zionists and even antisemites". Within the government ranks, there was no "dissent against [Joynson-Hicks's] activity ... least of all from ... Baldwin". Cesarani says Baldwin chose the right-winger Joynson-Hicks for his government because he considered him "a desirable representative of elemental Toryism", a "representative figure" who would "enhance, rather than detract from, first, his electoral team, and second, his government".

Towards the start of his Home Secretary career Joynson-Hicks was visited by the right-wing organisation National Citizens Union. Joynson-Hicks told the group he would not allow a mass arrival of immigrants to Britain and that he would not hesitate to use his power to deport aliens. Under Joynson-Hicks, the Home Office became "the bane of the Jewish community" and "the situation of Jewish aliens had deteriorated seriously". Jews who had not become British citizens were deported for misdemeanors but, when they applied for citizenship, were met with long, unnecessary delays with kept them in the precarious position of alien. A group from the Board of Deputies of British Jews visited Joynson-Hicks at the Home Office in February 1925 to ask for an improvement to the regulations concerning aliens, "the establishment of immigration boards to judge cases of aliens forbidden to land by immigration officers, some modification of the Home Secretary's power of deportation [and an] to end the delays in naturalization". Joynson-Hicks dismissed their requests.

In November 1925, during parliamentary debates about the renewal of the Aliens Act, Joynson-Hicks was confronted about his actions by Labour MP John Scurr and Jewish Conservative MP Samuel Finburgh. Scurr said that the Aliens Act was being used "against one section of the community, and particularly against the poorer members of the Jewish community". Samuel Finburgh highlighted that Jews who "had been trying to get naturalized [were finding that] every possible obstruction was placed in their way". Joynson-Hicks responded by challenging Finburgh to give him a single example of when the Home Office had shown anti-Jewish bias, even though, Cesarani points out, Joynson-Hicks had entered and accepted a Home Office already discriminating against Jews in the applications for citizenship and, during his time in office, had received a memorandum on naturalization from John Pedder, the Home Office Principal Assistant Secretary, who regularly processed complaints from the Jewish community about Home Office action.

When asked by a Jewish journalist, Meir Grossman, about the "impression [that] has gain ground" that Joynson-Hicks was "in general antagonistic to the alien population" and, more particularly "in the exercising [of] his discretion as Home Secretary", was "discriminating against Jewish applicants" for citizenship, Joynson-Hicks replied that he was upset by the accusation of antisemitism, insisted that he was fair. However, his bias against the Jews was revealed when he went on to give the following example of the "chief test" which he would apply before granting citizenship:

The chief test ... is whether the applicant has, so far as can be judged, become an Englishman at heart and has completely identified himself with English interests. I will give you an example. If two brothers came to this country and one of them settles in a district where only aliens live, continues to speak his native language, marries a woman from his own country, sends his child to a school where only foreign children are kept, keeps his account in a foreign bank, employs only foreign labour, while the other marries and Englishwoman, sends his children to an English school, speaks English, employs British labour, keeps his accounts in a British bank, it is the second brother and not the first who will stand to obtain naturalization.

The anti-alien legislation, as described and used by Joynson-Hicks in this way, was antisemitic.

In the 1930s, the Conservative Home Secretary refused to meet a delegation from organisations combating antisemitism.

=== Winston Churchill's conspiracy theories ===
After the 1924 general election, Winston Churchill joined the ranks of the Conservatives (previously, he had been a Liberal but ran as a Constitutionalist during the election). Churchill was a Zionist and held both positive and antisemitic opinions of Jews; however, even some of his positive views were based on antisemitic stereotypes. For example, Churchill commented:

Some people like Jews and some do not. But no thoughtful man can deny the fact that they are beyond question the most formidable and the most remarkable race which has ever appeared in the world. (Note: About this type of comment, Anthony Julius writes: 'This is a view many anti-Semites embrace and ex-anti-Semites will often retain, however much else they might discard. ... The Jews are not collectively formidable. They are weak, divided, heterogeneous. They have constituted themselves as a nation only with great difficulty, and never such as to secure the consent of the entirety of Jewry. ... [T]here is something dubious about the making of any general statement about Jews - however favourable. It cannot but simplify and therefore misrepresent the diversity of actual Jews. In its denial of their diversity, it does each one of them a distinct diservice'.)

In 1914 and 1920 Churchill had been accused of Jew baiting. After World War I, Churchill believed communism to be under the control of "international Jewry", which was "a world-wide conspiracy" dedicated to "the overthrow of civilization and the reconstruction of society". He expressed this in a 1920 Illustrated Sunday Herald article entitled "Zionism versus Bolshevism: A struggle for the soul of the Jewish people", which pitted good, Zionist Jews against the evil of Jewish controlled Bolshevism. In the article he cited favourably Nesta Helen Webster, the right-wing, antisemitic conspiracy theorist and was "tainted heavily with imagery" from the antisemitic fabricated text The Protocols of the Elders of Zion. The Jewish Chronicle castigated Churchill for the article.

Churchill had also told Lloyd George that the Jews were "the main instigators of the ruin of the Empire", that they had played "a leading part in Bolshevik atrocities", that the presence of Jews in radical groups was due (in Lebzelter's summation of Churchill's view) "to inherent inclinations rooted in Jewish character and religion", and that a government should not have "too many" Jews in it. He said Britain need beware the "international Soviet of the Russian and Polish Jew" and that he had found evidence of a "very powerful" Jewish lobby in the country. His antisemitism was shared by his wife, Clementine, who wrote to him in 1931 that she could understand "American Anti-Semitic prejudice". It has been suggests that Churchill learned to keep his antisemitism quiet for political advantage.

=== Involvement with Oswald Mosley ===
Oswald Mosley founded the January Club, a social and dining club, in 1934 to attract Establishment support for his British Union of Fascists movement, which had increasing levels of antisemitism. Conservative MPs and peers who became members included John Erskine, William Montagu-Douglas-Scott, Stafford Northcote (4th Earl of Iddesleigh) and Edward Spears.

The Conservative led government of the 1930s responded with a lack of concern to Nazi Germany's persecution of Jews, looking on the "Nazi actions as an internal affair of a foreign country", even after the Nuremberg Laws were enacted in September 1935.

=== The Cliveden Set ===
The Cliveden Set was an upper class group of politically influential people who were "in favour of friendly relations with Nazi Germany". Prominent members included the Conservative MP Nancy Astor (Viscountess Astor), her husband Waldorf Astor (Viscount Astor), and Edward Wood (Lord Halifax). In 1936, the Set wrote to Prime Minister Baldwin in support of Hitler's invasion of the Rhineland. Nancy Astor was "fiercely" antisemitic and "chronically suspicious of Jews", believing in the "anti-Semitic fantasy of Jewish power". She discouraged her husband from employing Jews at his newspaper, The Observer and suspected Jews were behind what she saw as "appalling anti-German propaganda" in New York newspapers. Astor would mimic Jewish businessmen. She made "frequent outbursts against Jews". When speaking to fellow Conservative MP Alan Graham in 1938, Astor's used much antisemitic language, including informing Graham, "Only a Jew like you would dare to be rude to me". She said of Chaim Weizmann that he was "the only decent Jew I have ever met". Nancy Astor believed that Nazism would solve "problems associated with Communism and the Jews". Writing to US ambassador Joseph P. Kennedy, Astor advised that it would take more than Hitler giving "a rough time" to "the killers of Christ" before she would support launching "Armageddon to save them". According to David Feldman, director of the Pears Institute for the Study of Antisemitism at Birkbeck, University of London, the Viscountess blamed antisemitism on the Jews: at an event held by a wealthy Jewish family, she said, "Did I not after all believe there must be something in the Jews themselves that had bought them persecution throughout all the ages?" Lady Astor's son, Jakie Astor, said that "the Jews" were one of his mother's "dragons to slay".

== Neville Chamberlain (1937–1940) ==
=== Parliamentary level ===
In the run up to World War II, "within the ranks of the governing Conservative party and its allies in the press (especially the pro-Nazi Daily Mail) there was an at-times ill-disguised noxious mix of snobbery and anti-Semitism".

==== Chamberlain's antisemitism and Truth ====
Conservative leader and Prime Minister Neville Chamberlain had a dislike for the Jews. According to R. B. Cockett, "it is in the pages of Truth that Chamberlain's real political sympathies and prejudices can be found; political sympathies that were often in striking contrast to the official political postures adopted by his own government". The Conservative newspaper Truth, secretly bought and overseen by Chamberlain's friend and former MI5 officer Joseph Ball (now director of the Conservative Research Department), had been obtained as an attempt "by a caucus within [the] British government to influence events anonymously via the control of a newspaper". The paper was a "Conservative propaganda organ", pro-Chamberlain, antisemitic and racist. The paper praised Hitler and attacked Chamberlain's enemies, "a collection of persons and ideologies that would have closely resembled any hate-list that Hitler might have cared to draw up. Chief among these were the Bolsheviks/Communists and Jews". Both Truth and Chamberlain accused people who questioned Chamberlain's attempts at appeasement with Nazi Germany of being "unEnglish", "Jewish/Communist traitor[s] of the true English cause", or having been misled by "Jewish-Communist propaganda". The Daily Mirror, which was a critic of Chamberlain, was accused in Truth of being manipulated by a secret, subversive Jewish interest; and Fleet Street at large was said to be a "Jew-infested sink", led by the Jewish publisher Victor Gollancz.

Truth also attacked Jewish figures directly. George Strauss MP were accused of cowardice because they did not join the armed forces during World War I (Truth paid Strauss damages for this libel), and Truth carried out an antisemitic character assassination on Leslie Hore-Belisha after he resigned from office as Minister of War in 1940 at Chamberlain's request. The paper had been attacking Hore-Belisha since 1937.

Truth saw the potential war with Nazi Germany to be a "Jewish war", fought in Jewish interests, which it opposed. It became the voice of those of had argued with Chamberlain for appeasement with Nazi Germany. It employed Major-General J. F. C. Fuller (Oswald Mosley's former military adviser), who wrote against claims that the Germans were using concentration camps. The paper ignored the antisemitic pogroms carried out by the Germans in November 1938. In November 1938, after the Kristallnacht, Chamberlain wrote to his sister, saying, "No doubt the Jews aren't a lovable people; I don't care about them myself; but that is not sufficient to explain the Pogrom".

==== Churchill's Liberty article ====
In June 1937, Churchill was commissioned to write an article for the American magazine Liberty on the so-called Jewish problem. Churchill gave his ghostwriter Adam Marshall Diston some suggestions on what to write and then Diston ghostwrote the article. Churchill made some handwritten marks on the draft and the article was sent for typing without correction. The article repeated the popular idea that Jews brought antisemitism on themselves by remaining distanced and separate from the rest of society, and it repeated offensive stereotypes of Shylock and his "pound of flesh", Jewish usurers, and "Hebrew bloodsuckers". In part, the article, entitled "How the Jews can Combat Persecution", said:

The Jew in England is a representative of his race. Every Jewish money-lender recalls Shylock and the idea of the Jews as usurers. And you cannot reasonably expect a struggling clerk or shopkeeper, paying forty or fifty per cent interest on borrowed money to a "Hebrew bloodsucker" to reflect that, throughout long centuries, almost every other way of life was closed to the Jews; or that there are native English moneylenders who insist, just as implacably, upon their "pound of flesh".

In the end the article was not published, despite Churchill's repeated efforts to sell it. According to Richard Toye, "Churchill was entirely happy to put the article out in his own name and thus take responsibility for the views it expressed". In 1940, Churchill declined an offer to have the article published, his office stating that it would be "inadvisable to publish the article ... at the present time".

==== Archibald Maule Ramsay MP and the Right Club ====
On 13 January 1938, Archibald Maule Ramsay, the Unionist MP for Peebles and Southern Midlothian, gave a speech to the Arbroath Business Club in which he observed that Adolf Hitler's antipathy to Jews arose from his knowledge "that the real power behind the Third International is a group of revolutionary Jews". His United Christian Front (formed in 1937) aimed to combat attacks on Christianity from "the Red Menace" – he believed that Bolshevism was Jewish. Ramsey was influenced and made use of The Rulers of Russia by a Roman Catholic priest from Ireland, Father Denis Fahey, which contended that of 59 members of the Central Committee of the Communist Party of the Soviet Union in 1935, 56 were Jews, and the remaining three were married to Jews. Ramsay was sympathetic to Nazi Germany: in September, he wrote to The Times to defend the right of the pro-German Sudetenland to self-determination. On 15 November 1938, Ramsay was invited to a luncheon party at the German Embassy in London, where he met British sympathisers with Nazi Germany, including Barry Domvile. In December he introduced a Private Member's Bill called the "Companies Act (1929) Amendment Bill", which would require shares in news agencies and newspapers to be held openly and not through nominees. In his speech promoting the Bill, Ramsay said the press was being manipulated and controlled by "international financiers" based in New York City who wanted to "thrust this country into a war".

In December 1938, The Fascist (journal of the Imperial Fascist League) declared that Ramsay had "become Jew-wise". On 10 January 1939, Ismay Ramsay, Archibald's wife, gave another speech to the Arbroath Business Club, at which she claimed the national press was "largely under Jewish control", that "an international group of Jews ... were behind world revolution in every single country" and defended Hitler's antisemitism, saying he "must ... have had his reasons for what he did". The speech was reported in the local newspaper and attracted the attention of the rabbi of the Edinburgh Hebrew Congregation, Dr Salis Daiches, who wrote to The Scotsman challenging Mrs Ramsay to produce evidence. Ramsay wrote on her behalf citing Father Fahey's booklet, and the resulting correspondence lasted for nearly a month – including a letter from 11 Ministers of the Church of Scotland in the County of Peebles repudiating the views of their MP. Some members of Ramsay's local Conservative Association in Peebles were not pleased by what they considered negative publicity; however, the Peebles Conservative Association expressed its "solidarity and unanimity" with Ramsay and he received an "enthusiastic welcome" at local Conservative meetings. On 27 April he spoke to a branch of the (antisemitic) Nordic League (of which he was a member) in Kilburn, attacking Neville Chamberlain for introducing conscription "at the instigation of the Jews" and claiming that the Conservative Party "relies on ... Jew money".

In May 1939, Ramsay set up the Right Club, to fight so-called Judeo-Bolshevism. Ramsay said that "The main objective [of the Right Club] was to oppose and expose the activities of organised Jewry". Its first objective "was to clear the Conservative Party of Jewish influence. The logo of the Right Club, seen on its badge, was of an eagle killing a snake with the initials P.J. (which stood for "Perish Judah"). Members of the Right Club included well-known antisemites like William Joyce (AKA Lord Haw-Haw), Arnold Leese, A. K. Chesterton (who had left Mosley's BUF in 1933 because Mosley had not been antisemitic enough for him), along with Conservative peers and politicians, like James Graham (at the time, Marquess of Graham), William Forbes-Sempill (Lord Sempill), David Freeman-Mitford (Lord Redesdale), Gerard Wallop (Lord Lymington), and John Hamilton Mackie. At its early meetings, Arthur Wellesley (Duke of Wellington) (one of Churchill's friends) took the chair. The Right Club held closed meetings in the House of Commons. Ramsay distributed copies of the antisemitic periodical The Truth to MPs. The paper was a Conservative Party publication and was edited by an antisemite.

During the time Ramsay was launching the Right Club, he spoke at a meeting of the Nordic League at the Wigmore Hall at which a reporter from the Daily Worker was present and reported Ramsay as saying that they needed to end Jewish control, "and if we don't do it constitutionally, we'll do it with steel" – a statement greeted with wild applause. The popular magazine John Bull picked up on the report and challenged Ramsay to contradict it or explain himself. Ramsay's local constituency newspaper, the Peeblesshire Advertiser, made the same challenge and Ramsay responded by admitting he had made the speech, citing the fact that three halls had refused to host the meeting as evidence of Jewish control. On the second day of the Second World War, 4 September 1939, Ramsay sat in the library of the House of Commons and, on House of Commons headed notepaper, write a parody of Land of Hope and Glory, which contained the following lines:

Land of dope and Jewry
Land that once was free
All the Jew boys praise thee
While they plunder thee ...
Land of Jewish finance
Fooled by Jewish lies
In press and books and movies
While our birthright dies.

One 12 September 1939, Hugh Grosvenor (Duke of Westminster) read out an antisemitic anti-war statement at one of the Right Club's meetings. The statement said that the war (later known as the Second World War) was "part of a Jewish and Masonic plot to destroy Christian civilization". The statement was circulated to a number of Cabinet ministers, including Winston Churchill and Neville Chamberlain. The following day, after several ministers complained to Churchill about the Duke of Westminster's "indiscretion", Churchill wrote a note to the Duke, but did not address the antisemitic elements of speech; rather, Churchill's concern was with the Duke's opposition to the war. The Right Club spent the so-called Phoney War period at the start of the Second World War distributing propaganda in the form of leaflets and "sticky-backs" (adhesive labels containing slogans), with Ramsay later explaining that he wanted "to maintain the atmosphere in which the "Phoney War", as it was called, might be converted into an honourable negotiated peace". In addition to Ramsay's Land of dope and Jewry rhyme, the slogans included "War destroys workers" and "This is a Jews' War". Some of the leaflets asserted "the stark truth is that this war was plotted and engineered by the Jews for world-power and vengeance".

On 20 March 1940, Ramsay asked a question about a propaganda radio station set up by Germany which gave its precise wavelength, which was suspected by both his allies and opponents as a subtle way of advertising it. On 9 May he asked for an assurance from the Home Secretary "that he refuses to be stampeded ... by a ramp in our Jew-ridden press".

==== Ronald Nall-Cain ====
In April 1939, Ronald Nall-Cain (Baron Brocket), who joined various antisemitic organisations, attended Hitler's 50th birthday celebration.

==== Antisemitism towards Leslie Hore-Belisha ====
Around the start of 1940, senior Conservative parliamentarians, including Harold Macmillan and Robert Gascoyne-Cecil (Viscount Cranbourne), led an antisemitic attack on Secretary of State for War Leslie Hore-Belisha, the influence of which led Prime Minister Neville Chamberlain to remove him from office in January 1940. A week after Hore-Belisha was dismissed, Ramsay distributed in the House of Commons copies of Truth (a magazine connected to Neville Chamberlain) which made allegations about Hore-Belisha's financial activities. Ramsay also put down a motion which cited the regretful reactions of many newspapers to Hore-Belisha's sacking as evidence of Jewish control of the press. Subsequently, Hore-Belisha was blocked from taking office as Minister of Information because of antisemitic pressure led by the Foreign Secretary, Edward Wood. Edward Stanley (Lord Derby) commented to the French Ambassador, "I hope you and your people do not take M[onsieur] Hore-Belisha to be a true Englishman". Henry "Chips" Channon, a "great friend of Leslie Hore-Belisha", referred to Hore-Belisha as "the Jew boy" ("[but] I am fond of him", they added). Channon also described Hore-Belisha as "an oily man, half-Jew, an opportunist, with the Semitic flair for publicity". During this time there was antisemitism "in the corridors of power".

=== Grassroots level ===
==== Antisemitism towards Jewish election candidates ====
Daniel Lipson, Mayor of Cheltenham, was rejected by Cheltenham Conservative Association as their potential election candidate in the 1937 by-election because of antisemitism within the association.

== Winston Churchill (1940–1955) ==
According to Colin Shindler, during Winston Churchill's political life, there was "ingrained anti-Semitism in the Conservative Party".

=== 1945 general election and the Hampstead "anti-alien" petition ===
In August 1945 The Jewish Chronicle reported that "antisemitism on the part of [Conservative] party supporters had led many local political associations not to select Jewish candidates". During the election campaign of that year, Conservative candidate Wavell Wakefield said that Jewish refugees should be repatriated to solve London's housing crisis. During the campaign, too, the Daily Herald accused the Conservatives of making antisemitic remarks about Professor Harold Laski (political theorist of the London School of Economics and chair of the Labour Party's National Executive Committee). In 1945, the local Hampstead Conservative group began agitation against Jewish immigration.

In October 1945, an antisemitic petition was drawn up, with the help of Waldron Smithers's (Conservative MP for Orpington) Fighting Fund for Freedom, by residents of Hampstead, requesting "that aliens of Hampstead should be repatriated to assure men and women of the Forces should have accommodation upon their return" from World War II. The petition was signed by the antisemitic Conservative mayor of Hampstead Sydney A. Boyd and four of Hampstead's Conservative councillors, with the rest of the Conservative members of the council in favour of the petition. Hampstead's Conservative MP, Charles Challen, promised to give the petition his "unstinting support" and he asked a number of questions in the House of Commons on behalf of the petitioners over the following months. When the petition was complete, Conservative Councillor J. A. Hughes passed it to Challen who, "rather than repudiate the sponsors for their antisemitism", delivered it to Parliament.

=== Rural and urban antisemitism ===
Surveying the period from 1945, after the end of the Second World War, until 1988, Geoffrey Alderman says that "anti-Jewish prejudice was rampant in some Conservative associations in rural areas", and that "it was by no means confined to the countryside". At a civic reception held in 1945 to confer upon Sydney A. Boyd the status of Honorary Freeman of the Borough, the Conservative Mayor of Hampstead made a number of "cheap antisemitic gibes", including the suggestion that Swiss Cottage needed a "British Consul".

In 1946, Charles Challen led a protest against construction to turn a former Congregationalist church into a synagogue – it was "a thinly veiled anti-Semitic attack which effectively objected to appropriation of a formerly 'English' space by Jews". In October 1948, Douglas Peroni (former treasurer of the Hampstead branch of the British Union of Fascists and chair of the fascist Hampstead Literary Society, and leader of the Hampstead branch of Oswald Mosley's Union Movement) established "an active fascist group" within the local Hampstead parliament. The local Conservative group reached an accord with the fascists on the issue of Jewish immigration.

== Eden, Macmillan and Heath (1955–1975) ==
=== Anthony Eden (1955–1957) ===
In 1956, Keith Joseph was elected as an MP but he faced challenges from antisemitic forces within the Conservative party, which at the time had a "reputation for being unwelcoming to Jews". One of the people who interviewed him "for inclusion on the party's candidates list" commented, "As a Jew, I suppose he is not every constituency's man and, therefore, his placing would need care" and, indeed, Joseph faced "local mutterings against picking a Jew to represent the party". Within the parliamentary party, Joseph was considered "something of an outsider" and "lamentably exotic".

=== Harold Macmillan (1957–1963) ===
==== Macmillan's antisemitism ====
Macmillan wrote to a friend during the 1919 Paris peace talks that the government of Prime Minister Lloyd George was not "really popular, except with the International Jew". Macmillan's diaries were "spattered with abuse of other public figures, often tinged with antisemitism". Gerald Kaufman was someone Macmillan referred to antisemitically in his diaries. Macmillan "often made snide jokes about Jews and Jewish politicians". On another occasion, he called Leslie Hore-Belisha "Horeb Elisha", thereby highlighting his Jewish ancestry by referencing Mount Horeb and the prophet Elisha.

==== Involvement with antisemitic groups ====
In 1958, the Conservative Party Council of the Bournemouth constituency nominated James Friend to be the constituency's prospective parliamentary candidate. Jewish members of the council resigned because, they alleged, Friend had "close links with the antisemitic League of Empire Loyalists and has engaged in antisemitic activities". Friend had given the inaugural meeting of the League of Empire Loyalists' local branch. Douglas Hogg (Lord Hailsham), chairman of the British Conservative Party, reportedly made a personal inquiry into the matter.

==== Golf Club antisemitism ====
In 1957 "prominent Conservatives" who were in control of the Finchley Golf Club were barring Jews from joining. This, according to Alderman, was the "most blatant example" of "anti-Jewish prejudice ... rampant in some [parts of the] Conservative associations" in post-war Britain; it resulted in "an angry wave of Jewish anti-Tory protest" in the Finchley area.

=== Edward Heath (1965–1975) ===
==== "Zionist influence" investigation ====
In 1971, when Edward Heath was Prime Minister and the Foreign Office was headed by Alec Douglas-Home, the Foreign and Commonwealth Office launched a secret investigation to "evaluate Zionist influence in the US and Europe". The findings "echoed anti-Semitic notions of Jewish financial power, dual loyalty and undue political influence". The report was concerned with power and influence of "Jewish money" and the "Jewish lobby" and "appeared to treat the people and organizations involved in British Zionism not as British citizens exercising their democratic rights, but as agents of foreign pressure on the government", "reflected a belief that Diaspora Jewish interests were separate from, and even inimical to, those of the countries in which they lived".

==== Antisemitism towards Gerald Kaufman ====
The Labour MP Gerald Kaufman was critical of the arms delivery embargo the Conservative government imposed on Israel during the 1973 attack by Egypt on Israel. Foreign Secretary Alec Douglas-Home told Kaufman that his (Kaufman's) "loyalty appeared to be to Israel and not to Britain". To Kaufman, "It was a clear anti-Jewish insinuation". On another occasion, Charles Taylor told Kaufman to "Get back to Tel Aviv".

== Margaret Thatcher (1975–1990) ==
=== Parliamentary level ===
==== Alan Clark ====
In 1981, Alan Clark (Minister of State for Trade, 1986–1989; Minister for Defence Procurement, 1989–1992) told Frank Johnson that he, Clark, was a Nazi. He wrote in his diary that day (Tuesday 8 December) about the conversation: "Yes, I told him, I was a Nazi. I really believed it to be the ideal system, and that it was a disaster for the Anglo-Saxon races and for the world that it was extinguished". When Johnson questioned whether he was serious, Clark confirmed he was: "Oh yes, I told him, I was completely committed to the whole philosophy". Clark also told Christopher Hitchens that he, Clark, was a Nazi.

On 31 March 1982, Clark made the following diary entry:

Today I asked an offensive question about Jews. It is always thought to be rude to refer to "Jews", isn't it? I remember that slightly triste occasion, watched from the gallery, of my father being inaugurated into the Lords and my rage at Sidney Bernstein, who was being ennobled on the same afternoon and would not take the Christian oath. As loudly as I could I muttered and mumbled about "Jews" in order to discomfit his relations who were also clustered in the gallery.

I had hung it around the Foreign Secretary's visit to Israel ... It is always fun to see how far you can go with taboo subjects...

On 26 December 1986, while Minister of State for Trade, Clark described in his diary the colour of someone's gold Rolls-Royce as "Jewish racing yellow", adding that apparently that is what "the colour is termed in the Mess at Knightsbridge".

During a visit to Poland in 1989, Clark visited the Wolf's Lair at Rastenburg to celebrate Hitler's escape from the 20 July plot. He referred to Hitler by the intimate nickname Wolf, used by the Bayreuth Circle, and named his pets after Hitler's companions. He quoted approvingly from Mein Kampf and had signed photograph of Hitler, which he "would consult ... in moments of stress".

Recounting their school days at Eton College, fellow Conservative MP Marcus Kimball said Clark "was very unpopular ... because he was a Nazi; no question about it. He supported the Nazi party".

The Association of Jewish Refugees placed Clark in the middle of a continuum of Holocaust denial, between David Irving and John Charmley.

==== Hamilton's Nazi salute ====
On an August 1983 parliamentary trip to Berlin, Neil Hamilton allegedly made a Nazi salute "with two fingers to his nose to give the impression of a toothbrush moustache" when outside the Reichstag. The salute was reported on 30 January 1984 in a BBC Panorama programme, "Maggie's Militant Tendency". Hamilton sued the BBC for libel, claiming that he had no recollection of making the salute. The BBC pulled out of the case and Hamilton was awarded £20,000 in damages. However, after the case collapsed, Hamilton admitted in a Sunday Times article to having made the Nazi salute.

==== Antisemitism towards Jews in the cabinet ====
There were a number of Jews in Margaret Thatcher's cabinet, all of whom experienced antisemitism from their colleagues. The antisemitism may have played a role in the resignation of two Jewish cabinet members. Harold Macmillan commented that the Conservative cabinet "was more old Estonian than old Etonian", which was "a none-too-subtle way of putting Nigel Lawson, Leon Brittan or Michael Howard in their place". Leon Brittan resigned as Trade and Industry Secretary in January 1986 over the Westland affair. Jonathan Aitken wrote of Brittan's resignation: "Soon after a poisonous meeting of Tory backbenchers at the 1922 Committee he fell on his sword. It was a combination of a witch hunt and a search for a scapegoat – tainted by an undercurrent of anti-Semitism. [...] I believed what should have been obvious to anyone else, that he was being used as a lightning conductor to deflect the fire that the Prime Minister [Margaret Thatcher] had started and inflamed". In the discussion over who should replace Leon Brittan after he was removed from the cabinet, John Stokes commented that the "replacement should at least be a 'proper red-faced, red-blooded Englishman'". The Jewish Board of Deputies sensed an antisemitic slur in the words, as did Brittan's non-Jewish wife Diana Brittan. Other antisemitic comments were made about Brittan by his fellow Conservatives: "But these came from members who would make slighting remarks about almost anyone with a background different from their own", Conservative MPs commented.

Edwina Currie also received antisemitic comments from "certain red-faced, red-blooded Englishmen on the Tory backbenches". Former MP Anna McCurley reported that Currie, despite being a member of the Church of England (sic), was labelled a "pushy Jewess". An advisor to John Moore commented that the Conservative backbenches were "riddled with prejudice of every kind", with "anti-Semitism [being] secondary to the male chauvinism" in the case of Currie. John Marshall also said that there was antisemitism in the Conservative party at this time.

=== Grassroots level ===
==== Antisemitism towards Jewish election candidate ====
In 1982 Michael Howard finally became election candidate for Folkestone after having been rejected by about 40 constituency parties because of antisemitism within those parties.

==== Links to the NF ====
During the 1983 general election a Conservative Party candidate who had formerly been a member of the National Front ran for election in a marginal constituency, Stockton South. The Board of Deputies of British Jews distributed flyers in the constituency to inform people of this. The SDP won the seat, but only very narrowly.

== Major, Hague and Howard (1990–2005) ==
=== John Major (1990–1997) ===
In 1997, during the Conservative leadership election of William Hague, Shadow Foreign Secretary Ann Widdecombe spoke out against Michael Howard, under whom she had served when he was Home Secretary. She remarked in the House of Commons that there was "something of the night" about Howard, who is of Romanian Jewish descent. This remark was considered by some to be antisemitic.

=== William Hague (1997–2001) ===
In 2000, four Oxford University Conservative Association (OUCA) members were expelled for making Nazi salutes. The New Statesman reported that a member of the OUCA committee at the university's 2001 Freshers' Fair greeted new students by saying, "Welcome to OUCA – the biggest political group for young people since the Hitler Youth". Another prominent member was dismissed from the Oxford University Student Union's executive for "marching up and down doing a Nazi salute".

=== Michael Howard (2002–2005) ===
In October 2004, a Conservative frontbencher said, "The trouble is that the [Conservative] party is being run by Michael Howard, Maurice Saatchi, and Oliver Letwin – and none of them really knows what it is to be English". Another report said "a junior frontbencher ... was musing about how the party was now being led. Saatchi, Michael Howard and Oliver Letwin were in charge: could they know how Englishmen felt?"

== David Cameron (2005–2016) ==
=== Parliamentary level ===
==== Membership of European Conservatives and Reformists ====
In 2009, prominent Jewish community leaders – including chief rabbi of Poland Michael Schudrich, Rafał Pankowski of the Holocaust campaign group "Never Again", Rabbi Barry Marcus of the London Central Synagogue, the Parisian European Jewish Congress and others – expressed concern over Conservative Party membership of the European Conservatives and Reformists (ECR) group, to which the Conservative MEPs belonged. The chair of the group was Michał Kamiński of Poland's Law and Justice party, who was, in the words of a New Statesman writer, "widely seen on the Continent as anti-Semitic". Kaminski is a former member of the neo-Nazi National Revival of Poland party (NOP). Another leading ECR activist, Dr Roberts Zīle of Latvia's National Alliance party, caused concern due to his party's alleged role in commemorative events for Latvian Waffen SS units. The Conservative Party's "alliances with far-right, anti-semitic political parties on the continent" had become a concern for US politicians.

==== Burley's Nazi-themed stag do ====
In 2012, Conservative MP Aidan Burley was sacked from his role as ministerial aide because he organised a Nazi-themed stag do in 2011. Burley supplied an SS uniform and insignia to the groom, who was fined £1,500 by a French court for wearing the costume and ordered to pay €1,000 to an organisation representing families of those who had been sent to death camps during World War Two. A Conservative Party report on Burley's behaviour, authored by Conservative peer Lord Gold, released in 2014 said Burley was not racist or antisemitic but that he had acted in a "stupid and offensive way". Ian Austin and The Mail on Sunday accused Burley of providing misleading information to the inquiry. Prime Minister David Cameron and the Conservative leadership stood in support of Burley.

==== Cameron and the use of "yid" ====
During a 2013 row over Tottenham Hotspur fans' use of the slurs Yid and Yiddos, David Cameron defended the fans' use of the words, saying Spurs fans should not be prosecuted for using them. This was in opposition to newly released guidelines from the Football Association and contrary to the Crown Prosecution Service's and the Metropolitan Police's use and defence of the Public Order Act 1986. Journalist Stefan Fatsis wrote that Cameron was giving an excuse for people to "propagat[e] racial and ethnic slurs and stereotypes" and Cameron was criticised by lawyer Peter Herbert for condoning and legitimising antisemitism. In the following year, the Metropolitan Police stated that Tottenham fans would not be arrested for chanting the word, unless a complaint was received.

==== Rees-Mogg and the Traditional Britain Group ====
In 2013, a backbench MP, Jacob Rees-Mogg, was guest-of-honour and gave the keynote speech at a dinner of the racist Traditional Britain Group (TBG). The Antisemitism Policy Trust highlighted Rees-Mogg's attendance at this party in their Antisemitism and the Conservative Party dossier. Before the dinner date, the anti-fascist magazine Searchlight contacted Rees-Mogg "to try to dissuade him from speaking at the dinner", but it was "to no avail". At the time, the vice-president of the group, who sat next to Rees-Mogg at the dinner, was Gregory Lauder-Frost (TBG vice president), formerly political secretary of the Conservative Monday Club (when Lauder-Frost was a member, the Monday Club was "a pressure group within the Tory party" – it was "later banned by Iain Duncan Smith [in 2001] because of its views on race"). Speaking to an undercover Hope Not Hate researcher in 2017 about Vanessa Feltz, Lauder-Frost said, "She's a fat Jewish s**g, she's revolting, revolting. She lives with a negro. She's horrible". At the time Rees-Mogg spoke at the dinner, the TBG's president was Merlin Hanbury-Tracy (Lord Sudeley), a member of the Conservative Party, a Conservative peer, and former chairman of the Conservative Monday Club.

==== Mercer's "bloody Jew" comment ====
In May 2014, Conservative MP Patrick Mercer was recorded by journalist Daniel Foggo saying, during the course of an anecdote, that an Israeli soldier looked like a "bloody Jew". Mercer stepped down as MP after an investigation and report by the House of Commons standards committee into his links to lobbying and paid advocacy.

==== Bridgen's "Jewish lobby" ====
In October 2014, Conservative MP Andrew Bridgen said, in a speech in the House of Commons, that "the political system of the world's superpower and our great ally the United States is very susceptible to well-funded powerful lobbying groups and the power of the Jewish lobby in America". Following condemnation by organisations, Bridgen stood by his remarks.

==== Attacks on Ed Miliband ====
Conservative attacks on the Labour leader Ed Miliband in 2014 and 2015 have been criticised as coded antisemitism. Francis Beckett claimed that some attacks on Ed Miliband and his father, the academic Ralph Miliband, were antisemitic. Beckett concluded that "we have been conned into believing that anti-Semitism is now a disease of the left. In reality, it is still found mostly in racism's historic home: on the right."

=== Local level ===
In April 2015, Conservative Derby local council candidate Gulzabeen Afsar was suspended for saying she could never support "the Jew" Ed Miliband.

=== Grassroots level ===
In 2011, one officer of the Oxford University Conservative Association (OUCA) stated that some association members at weekly meetings sang a Nazi-themed song that included the lines "Dashing through the Reich / killing lots of Kike".

In October 2014 UCL Conservative Society was ordered by UCL's Student Union to apologise for creating a "toxic environment" in which discrimination, including antisemitism, was the culture. One accusation was that a member of the society said, "Jews own everything, we all know it's true. I wish I was Jewish, but my nose isn't long enough". The society denied the accusations. There is no evidence the Conservative party investigated the incidents.

== Theresa May (2016–2019) ==
=== Parliamentary level ===
==== Former aide for Theresa May ====
In February 2018, May's former aide, Nick Timothy, co-wrote a story for The Daily Telegraph which described Jewish philanthropist George Soros's funding of the anti-Brexit campaign as a "secret plot". This was criticised as antisemitic by journalists Hugo Rifkind and Dan Hodges, as well as former campaign director to Tony Blair Alastair Campbell, and American-British author and playwright Bonnie Greer. In response, Timothy tweeted: "Throughout my career I've campaigned against antisemitism, helped secure more funding for security at synagogues and Jewish schools".

==== Support of alleged European antisemitic political parties ====
At the start of April 2018, foreign secretary Boris Johnson was criticised by opposition politicians and campaign groups for congratulating Viktor Orbán on his re-election as Prime Minister of Hungary, in part because of concern about "anti-Semitic undertones" to Orban's campaign. Later that month, a number of Jewish organisations called on the Conservative government to confront European political parties that had fuelled antisemitism, particularly those the Conservatives were affiliated in the European Conservatives and Reformists group with, like Latvia's National Alliance, Poland's Law and Justice Party, and Hungary's Fidesz Party, with its leader Viktor Orbán. The organisations asked the Conservatives to withdraw their membership from the group until it is free of all racism, including antisemitism.

In September 2018, British Jewish leaders condemned the Conservatives because, in a vote to remove Hungary's voting rights at the European Council, the party defended Hungary's far-right Orbán government despite its "vivid antisemitism". Hungary was accused of corruption, "violating press freedoms, undermining judicial independence, and waging an antisemitic campaign against a leading Jewish businessman" (i.e., George Soros). The Conservatives, who were the only governing conservative party in western Europe to vote against the move, were accused by David Hirsh of "cosy[ing] up to an antisemitic and racist strong-man regime", "pandering to Jew-hate". They were seen, including by one of their own politicians, of defending Orbán "in a bid for backing in Brexit talks", of pretending not to recognise antisemitism "in the hope of gaining some advantage in return". According to The Jewish Chronicle, the vote "was truly shameful and a dark day for the party led by Mrs May". Later that month, Orbán wrote to the Conservative Party thanking them for their support in the vote.

Labour Party Chairperson Ian Lavery called on Theresa May to "explain and apologise for her Party's behaviour". After the vote, "a series of high-profile Conservatives" refused to condemn the vote, which, according to an editorial in The Jewish Chronicle, was "even worse" that the vote itself, adding that "it is vital that antisemitism is called out – wherever it is found". One of the Conservatives who refused to condemn the vote and Orbán's antisemitism was Michael Gove. When asked to condemn Orbán, Gove said he would not "go down that route, play that game". The following month, the Conservatives were condemned again by Jewish leaders because Conservative politicians continued to refuse to condemn Orbán. One of them was Brexit minister Martin Callanan. The Jewish Chronicle said that this was occurring at the same time that the Conservatives were criticising Jeremy Corbyn over antisemitism in the Labour Party.

==== Suella Braverman's "Cultural Marxism" comments ====
The Conservative MP Suella Braverman was criticised by the Board of Deputies, Hope Not Hate and others in 2019 for saying at a meeting of the Bruges Group that her party was "engaged in a fight against Cultural Marxism", with the phrase interpreted by commentators as referring to a conspiracy theory pushed by various far-right voices that Western culture has supposedly been undermined by mostly Jewish students of the Frankfurt School. When asked by journalist Dawn Foster why she was "pushing a far-right term used by Anders Breivik", Braverman said she was "only trying to prevent further attacks on "British genius"".

==== Jacob Rees-Mogg ====
In March 2019, Rees-Mogg retweeted a speech by the leader of the far-right German political party Alternative for Germany (AfD). The AfD marched with neo-Nazis the year before and had been condemned by members of the German Jewish community as "racist and antisemitic", "no party for Jews", and a "danger to Jewish life in Germany". Following criticism, Rees-Mogg defended his decision to promote the AfD leader's speech.

=== Local level ===
==== Candidates ====
In 2017 a Birmingham Conservative council candidate left the Party after abusive tweets from 2013 and 2014 came to light; they included the mentioning of "foreign Jew agents".

A few days before the 2018 local elections, three Conservative council candidates were revealed to have made antisemitic comments. The candidate for the Fen Ditton and Fulbourn ward, Cambridgeshire, had commented that he was "Sweating like a Jew in an attic". The candidate for Stevenage Borough Council referred to the Jewish symbol the Star of David as the "Mark of the Beast". The candidate for the Barnes ward of Sunderland City Council wrote, "I can honestly say that this morning was the first time I've had to scrub off a Hitler stash with a toothbrush after a night out". They were all suspended. After winning his seat, however, the candidate for Sunderland Council – Anthony Mullen – was reinstated.

In the spring of 2019, when on a parliamentary candidate short list for Hackney North & Stoke Newington and Hackney South & Shoreditch, Councillor Ben Seifert was told by a party member not to run because he is Jewish and "you can have too many Jews". Seifert left the Conservative party in September 2019.

=== Grassroots level ===
==== Activists ====
In March 2017, a Conservative activist tweeted that it was time for Europe-wide purge like the Spanish Inquisition. This caused concern for Jews because the Inquisition "consisted of a state-organised pogrom predominantly targeting Jews with torture and cruel murder, for example being burned at the stake. The Alhambra Decree of 1492, commanded all Jews in Spain to convert to Catholicism or leave the country". The Welsh Conservative Party released a statement distancing themselves from the activist, but took no further steps.

In November 2017 Hope not Hate reported that Conservative Party activists were members of a Facebook group called Young Right Society, which was "awash with antisemitic, Holocaust denying and racist material". One of the group's administrators, Jack Hadfield, was a member of the Warwick Conservative Association.

==== Conservative Future Scotland's and Bruges Group's conspiracy theories ====
The antisemitic conspiracy theory "Cultural Marxism" was evident in the Conservative Party during 2018. In Scotland in July, the chairperson for the youth wing of the Scottish Conservatives, Conservative Future Scotland, was accused of antisemitism after using the phrase. The Scottish Green Party MSP Ross Greer wrote to Scottish Conservative leader Ruth Davidson asking her to treat the issue seriously because, according to him, the "conspiracy theory [was] quite literally created by the Nazis to demonise Jews as the enemy within".

The idea of "Cultural Marxism" emerged again at the Conservative Party Conference in October. Copies of a booklet called Moralitis: A Cultural Virus, by Robert Oulds (director of the Bruges Group) and Niall McCrae, were available at a Bruges Group meeting. The booklet espoused right-wing conspiracy theories with antisemitic origins, including "Cultural Marxism" and the Great Replacement. Two Jewish organisations, the Campaign Against Antisemitism and the Jewish Council for Racial Equality, called for an investigation into the racist booklet.

==== University Conservative society ====
At a Plymouth University Conservatives party in October 2018, some society members were pictured, according to the Daily Mirror, wearing clothing with homemade slogans on them, such as "Jude" (German for Jew) with a Star of David, and wearing a Hitler-style moustache. Plymouth's Students' Union suspended the society pending an investigation; Conservative Campaign Headquarters launched an investigation and said it would suspend any party members involved.

== Boris Johnson (2019–2022) ==
A few months before the 2001 general election in which he first entered Parliament as a Conservative MP, Boris Johnson, then editor of The Spectator, published an article by Taki Theodoracopulos in which Theodoracopulos (usually known as Taki) wrote about the Jewish world conspiracy and declared himself to be a "soi-disant anti-Semite". Johnson did not sack Taki, despite protest by the magazine's owner, Conrad Black.

Boris Johnson wrote the novel Seventy-Two Virgins. Within the novel, Johnson depicts Jews as "controlling the media" and being able to "fiddle" elections, and describes a Jewish character, a businessman who "relied on immigrant labour", as having a "proud nose and curly hair" and eyes of an "unblinking snake". Johnson's work has been criticised as antisemitic by MPs, Jewish politicians (including Andrew Feinstein and Charlotte Nichols), academics (including Brian Klug and David Graeber), actors (including Jolyon Rubinstein and Miriam Margolyes), journalists, campaigners, community leaders, lawyers (including Daniel Machover) and a member of the Board of Deputies.

=== Boris Johnson ===
In January 2017, Johnson met with Steve Bannon. Johnson was accused by the Jewish Labour Movement of hypocrisy for meeting Bannon, someone who, according to the JLM, "enabled right wing antisemitism to seep into the mainstream", while also criticising Labour's approach to antisemitism.

=== Parliamentary level ===
During a parliamentary debate on Brexit on 3 September 2019, Jacob Rees-Mogg, who had been appointed to the Cabinet by Johnson, called two Jewish Conservative MPs, including Oliver Letwin, members of the Illuminati, which, according to Michael Berkowitz, professor of Modern Jewish History, who commented on the incident, is one of the "most poisonous antisemitic canards in all of history ... frequently used as justification for violence". Antony Lerman suggests that this is "dog-whistle antisemitism and at the same time a chase for votes to shamelessly exploit Jewish fears". Early the next month, Rees-Mogg was criticised for referring to Jewish financier and billionaire George Soros as "the remoaner funder-in-chief". This was seen by some as a perpetuation of an antisemitic conspiracy theory and was condemned by Lord Alf Dubs as a comment "straight from the far-right's antisemitic playbook".

In 2019, Crispin Blunt MP accused the Chief Rabbi of Manchester of demanding "special status" for Britain's Jews. Blunt was later rebuked by the Jewish Leadership Council, which stated he should "clarify if he supports the concept of freedom of religion, a cornerstone of liberal democracy".

In 2019, the Conservative MP for Hastings and Rye, Sally-Ann Hart, was under investigation by the Conservative Party for antisemitism and Islamophobia. Hart "liked" a Nazi phrase on Facebook, "shared" an antisemitic slur and an antisemitic video. In July of the following year, the Jewish Chronicle reported that there was growing concern from antiracism organisations and the Board of Deputies that the Conservative Party were inactive over the investigation. In August, Hart stated that the investigation into the allegations over her social media posts had concluded and that she was "not found to be anti-Semitic, Islamophobic or anything else", although she had attended social media training.

The MP for Ashfield, Lee Anderson, was reported to be under investigation by the Conservative party for antisemitism in December 2019. As with the investigation into Hart, there was growing concern that the Conservative Party were inactive over the investigation into Anderson. In January 2021, Anderson stated to the Jewish Chronicle that as "no evidence was provided to substantiate the claims made against [him] the Conservative Party investigation [had] concluded". Hart and Anderson received training on antisemitism. No official report was released about the investigations.

In February 2020, John Bercow, the Jewish former Speaker of the House of Commons and Conservative MP, claimed that he had experienced "subtle" antisemitism from members of his own Conservative Party, and had never experienced any antisemitism from Labour MPs. Bercow went on to join the Labour Party in 2021.

In November 2020, following an interim report on the connections between colonialism and properties now in the care of the National Trust, including links with historic slavery, a letter to The Telegraph signed by 28 Conservative Parliamentarians (Note: The Parliamentarians who signed the letter were: John Hayes; Peter Lilley; Edward Leigh; Sally-Ann Hart; Tom Hunt; Imran Ahmad Khan; Lee Anderson; Gareth Bacon; Scott Benton; Bob Blackman; Ben Bradley; Brendan Clarke-Smith; Philip Davies; Nick Fletcher; Jonathan Gullis; Andrew Lewer; Chris Loder; Marco Longhi; Craig Mackinlay; Karl McCartney; Pauline Latham; David Morris; Andrew Rosindell; James Sunderland; Martin Vickers; Giles Watling; William Wragg; Margaret Eaton.) as the "Common Sense Group" accused the National Trust of being "coloured by cultural Marxist dogma, colloquially known as the 'woke agenda'", terminology described by the All-Party Parliamentary Group Against Antisemitism, Jewish Council for Racial Equality, anti-racist charity Hope Not Hate and the Campaign Against Antisemitism as antisemitic. Two of the letter's signatories – Sally-Ann Hart and Lee Anderson – were already under investigation for antisemitism.

The Board of Deputies of British Jews called on the Conservatives to discipline Daniel Kawczynski after the MP spoke at a far-right conference alongside Hungary's prime minister Viktor Orbán, Giorgia Meloni from the Brothers of Italy party, closely associated with Mussolini's fascism, Ryszard Legutko, a Polish Law and Justice MEP, and Marion Maréchal of the Le Pen family, a politician in France's National Rally. At the conference, Kawczynski praised Orbán and Matteo Salvini. The Board of Deputies and the All-Party Parliamentary Group against Antisemitism asked the Conservative Party to investigate Kawczynski's appearance at the conference. Muslim Council of Britain spokesperson Miqdaad Versi said, "It is unacceptable that anyone holding the position of MP speaks at a nationalist conference alongside Islamophobes and antisemites," and said it was "disturbing" that the Conservative Party whip appeared to have known the MP was going to speak at the conference but chose to take no action. Kawczynski's plan to attend the conference had been reported on prior to the event, shadow communities secretary Andrew Gwynne commenting, "It's disgraceful that just days after Holocaust Memorial Day Daniel Kawczynski is planning to share a platform with antisemites, Islamophobes and homophobes". Jewish journalist Rivkah Brown said that "Kawczynski is a symptom of a disease endemic within British Conservatism," and The Scotsman columnist Euan McColm said the failure of the Conservative Party to discipline Kawczynski showed they were not serious about antisemitism.

In May 2021, the Board of Deputies raised concerns "regarding antisemitic rhetoric, Holocaust revisionism and a number of other issues with Downing Street" ahead of a meeting Boris Johnson hosted with Hungarian leader Viktor Orban. MP Alex Sobel said, "Viktor Orbán is a renowned antisemite, fuelled violence against the Roma, clamps down on the LGBT and Muslim Communities. He suppresses basic democratic norms and press freedom. However Boris Johnson is rolling out the red carpet. MPs of all parties should be calling this out."

In December 2021, the Board of Deputies criticised MP Marcus Fysh for comparing proposed COVID-19 regulations to Nazi policies. President of the Board Marie van der Zyl said, "It is completely unacceptable to compare the proposed vaccine passports with Nazi Germany. We urge people, particularly those in positions of authority, to avoid these highly inappropriate comparisons". Other MPs also criticised Fysh, including Jewish MP Margaret Hodge.

==== Nancy Astor statue ====
In the third week of the 2019 United Kingdom general election, a number of Conservative politicians – including Prime Minister Boris Johnson, former Prime Minister Theresa May, and Rebecca Smith, the Conservative candidate for Plymouth Sutton and Devonport – attended the unveiling of a statue of former Conservative MP and first woman to take their seat in the House of Commons Nancy Astor, with May unveiling the statue. This was controversial as Astor was an outspoken antisemite who suggested the Nazis were a solution to "the world problems" of Jewry and Communism.

=== Parliamentary candidates ===
In 2019 Ryan Houghton, who was standing in the Aberdeen North constituency for the 2019 general election, was suspended for alleged antisemitic comments made in 2012 online in a free speech debate. Houghton discussed freedom of speech and comments made by Holocaust denier David Irving. Houghton retained the Conservative candidacy for Aberdeen North after his suspension due to statutory rules regarding ballot papers. Houghton was subsequently cleared by an independent investigation commissioned by the Scottish Conservative Party and readmitted with no further sanction.

Amjad Bashir, who was standing in the Leeds North East constituency for the 2019 general election, was suspended from the Conservative Party after The Jewish Chronicle reported on his claim that British Jews who visited Israel were returning as "brainwashed extremists". Bashir retained the Conservative candidacy for Leeds North East after his suspension. Richard Short, candidate for St Helens South and Whiston, questioned on Twitter whether journalist Melanie Phillips, who appeared on the BBC's Question Time, was being more loyal to Israel or Britain.

=== Local level ===
Mohammad Aslam, councillor for the Bradley ward in Pendle, shared a post saying the "Gaza massacre is the price of a Jewish state". He further claimed in an article that the then Labour MP, Ruth Smeeth, was "funded by [the] Israel lobby". Another post Aslam shared – later deleted, included the image of a bloodied child and a description of the Israeli government's actions as "Radical Jewish Terrorism".

During the Borehamwood Kenilworth ward byelection in 2020, Conservative councillors ran a campaign against Dan Ozarow that led to antisemitic attacks on the Labour candidate and his family. Two years later, following an investigation by Conservative Campaign Headquarters, five Tory councillors were disciplined for a hate campaign against Ozarow. The councillors were sent on a training course. Ozarow stated that he did not believe the Conservative Party were taking antisemitism seriously, calling the sanctions on the councillors "risible", while the local Conservative Association claimed Ozarow's allegations against the councillors were "politically motivated".

In July 2020, Robert (Bob) Caserta, a Conservative councillor in Bury, remarked that there were "litter grot spots" in Sedgley ward, home to one of the largest Jewish communities in the UK, and said that "it would be difficult communicating with residents unless you are able to speak Hebrew". A complaint was made that Caserta had used discriminatory language, and the council's standards sub-committee ruled that he had used "disrespectful and wholly inappropriate" language. Caserta had the whip removed but was later reinstated.

Sharon Thomason, selected as Conservative candidate for Warrington Borough Council in the 2021 election, was removed from standing after publicity of antisemitic comments she made about Labour MP Charlotte Nichols. The chair of Warrington Conservatives, Wendy Maisey, who had previously stood against Nichols in Parliamentary elections, was also involved in some of the inflammatory comments. In a statement in early February 2021, MP Angela Rayner, Labour's deputy leader and party chair, said, "Given Sharon Thomason made these comments before she was selected as a candidate, and this statement was raised with the chair of the local Conservative Association in Warrington before she was selected, the Conservative Party must explain why the promotion of Nazi ideology almost a year ago does not prevent someone from being selected as a Tory candidate". A few months later, Maisey stood in the election for Warrington Borough Council and was elected.

Tim Wills, Conservative councillor in Worthing, was suspended from the party in October 2021 for his support of the antisemitic and Neo-Nazi organisation Patriotic Alternative.

Ahead of the 2022 local elections, the Jewish Representative Council (JRC) of Greater Manchester and Region asked the Bury Conservative Party Association to call out allegedly antisemitic social media comments made by their candidates and wrote to the chair of the Conservative Party demanding an investigation into the local Association for what it described as the "recurring issue [of] prospective councillors posting racist content directed at the Jewish community". The JRC also expressed concerns about the promotion of a councillor, Shahbaz Mahmood Arif, who shared an article claiming a "pro-Israel lobbyist" donated to Keir Starmer's Labour leadership bid. The Campaign Against Antisemitism also wrote to the Conservative Party about "urgent questions about the local association". The local Association suspended two of its candidates (Sham Raja Akhtar and Shafqat Mahmood) accused of antisemitism and stood by a third (Mazhar Aslam). Shadman Zaman, another prospective candidate, was suspended from the party after refusing to delete social media posts offering condolences to Israel following a terrorist attack. One of the suspended members, Sham Raja, was confirmed as deputy chair of the party in Manchester.

=== Bias against "Jewish names" ===
A 2020 LSE study, measured local government officials' responsiveness to email correspondence from constituents with "stereotypically Muslim or Jewish names". Lee Crawfurd and Ukasha Ramli found both "Labour and Conservative councillors showed equal bias towards the two".

== Truss and Sunak (2022–2024) ==
During the first 2022 Conservative Party leadership election, candidate Liz Truss made a speech in which she praised the Jewish community for holding values such as setting up businesses and protecting the family unit and accused the British civil service of "woke antisemitism", but the speech itself was accused of antisemitism by several commentators, including the president of the Union of Jewish Students, senior rabbi Laura Janner-Klausner and the Jewish Council for Racial Equality.

Following allegations from the anti-racist campaign organisation Hope Not Hate, Andy Weatherhead, Conservative councillor for Hythe West on Kent County Council, was suspended from the Party while under investigation for involvement as a senior officer in the fascist New British Union, in which role he allegedly "wrote an antisemitic blog attacking the 'Jewish-controlled, helped to formulate the avowedly fascist and anti-democracy policies of the NBU and attended a rally in support of the violent Golden Dawn movement". Weatherhead said his involvement with the NBU was "in the spirit of education and curiousity [sic]".

On 11 January 2023, Conservative MP for North West Leicestershire Andrew Bridgen made a tweet referring to the alleged lack of safety of COVID-19 vaccines as "the biggest crime against humanity since the Holocaust". Prime Minister Rishi Sunak called the comparison "utterly unacceptable" and said he was "determined that the scourge of antisemitism is eradicated". Bridgen was suspended from the Conservative Party later that day.

At the 2023 National Conservatism Conference, held in London, Conservative MP for Penistone and Stocksbridge, Miriam Cates, gave a speech about how low birthrate was "the one overarching threat to British conservatism, and to the whole of western society", in which she said, "cultural Marxism ... is systematically destroying our children's souls". The government's antisemitism advisor John Mann said the phrase was antisemitic and that it was "just not appropriate for a parliamentarian to be using a term such as this".

In 2024, the UK Conservative Party criticized Labour leader Keir Starmer for taking Friday evenings off to observe Shabbat with his Jewish wife, Victoria Starmer. Conservatives suggested this would make him a "part-time prime minister". The criticism was repeated by Claire Coutinho and Grant Shapps. Starmer clarified that he takes time off to be with his children, with exceptions. Jewish Labour supporters defended Starmer, condemning the Conservative attack as an affront to his respect for his family's traditions.

== Kemi Badenoch (2024–present) ==
Lawyer Philippe Sands, who has a Jewish background, accused the Conservative Party of antisemitism in February 2025 after Conservative Leader Kemi Badenoch said Prime Minister Keir Stammer had capitulated to "north London lawyers" over the Chagos islands negotiations. Sands said the phrase was "a trope of a most unfortunate kind" aimed at Jewish lawyers. The Conservative Party said Sands' remarks were an "absurd smear".

During a House of Lords debate in March 2025 about plans for a Holocaust memorial near Parliament, Conservative peer Lord Hamilton made remarks deemed antisemitic by, among others, the Antisemitism Policy Trust, Karen Pollock (chief executive of the Holocaust Educational Trust) and a spokesperson for his party. He apologized for the comments, saying they were "not intended to be antisemitic".

== See also ==
- Antisemitism in the British Labour Party
- Antisemitism in the Green Party of England and Wales
- Antisemitism in the United Kingdom
- Racism in the British Conservative Party
- Islamophobia in the British Conservative Party
