= Antisemitism in the Green Party of England and Wales =

Incidents, allegations and debate of antisemitism regarding members of the Green Party of England and Wales has received increased attention by the media during the 2020s, following the outbreak of the Gaza war in 2023, and the Middle Eastern crisis.

In response to complaints, party officials have stated that antisemitism has "no place in Green politics" and have taken action to tackle it, such as antisemitism training initiatives.

== Internal discussion on Antisemitism definition ==
In 2021, the party formally adopted new internal guidance on antisemitism for use in disciplinary cases. Unlike the Labour and the Conservative parties, which adopted the International Holocaust Remembrance Alliance (IHRA) definition of antisemitism, the Green party's guidance document, proposed by Joshua Alston, also includes other definitions such as the Jerusalem Declaration on Antisemitism, which was created in response to criticism that the IHRA definition conflates criticism of Israel with antisemitism.

Following concerns by party members that the IHRA definition could be problematic for members advocating for Boycott, Divestment and Sanctions (BDS) against Israel, the motion that adopted the IHRA definition alongside other definitions includes a statement that it would not conflict with BDS, freedom of speech, or prevent legitimate criticism of any state. The motion passed with an overwhelming majority of the members attending the fall conference, including then Green Party co-leader Carla Denyer, and sole Green Party MP Caroline Lucas.

== 2024 allegations and response ==
In 2024, the BBC reported that Lord Mann, the UK Government's Independent Advisor on Antisemitism, contacted the Green Party prior to the May local elections about social media posts made in October 2023 by Bristol candidates Abdul Malik and Mohamed Makawi, the former showing part of a Hamas press conference and the latter made false claims about the killing of Israeli citizens.

A Green Party spokesperson referred to the posts as "ill-judged and offensive communications", and stated that antisemitism is incompatible with Green politics and that complaints are investigated through internal disciplinary procedures. In June 2024, the party said that it had withdrew support for a "small number" of election candidates due to their online activity. Makawi later denied putting up the post and said he condemns the October 2023 attacks on Israel, and the Green Party said that he apologised and undertaken social media training. The party also said that Malik was "unwittingly" implicated by being tagged in the post and deleted it when he became aware of it.

Whereas Lord Mann criticised the party for taking three weeks to respond to initial inquiry, a subsequent joint statement published by him and the party's leadership later that month said that they will continue "working together to ensure that antisemitism, like all racism, has no place in Green politics and to better educate Green representatives about anti-Jewish racism". The statement also said that while the party had already taken steps to address the issue, it acknowledged that further long-term work is necessary.

Joe Belcher, a Walsall candidate, allegedly shared content on social media, suggesting that Hamas might have been paid by Israel to carry out the 7 October 2023 attack. He was suspended by the party when running in the 2024 local elections. Raja Ateeq, another Walsall candidate, referred to “Jewish cockroaches” and called former Prime Minister of Pakistan, anti-Zionist Imran Khan a “Yahoodi [Jewish] agent”. According to the party, the tweet was deleted.

== 2026 allegations and responses ==
In 2025, Bournemouth candidate, Feda Shahin, claimed that in the Soviet Union 'the Zionists killed 20 million Christians', and 'love genocide'. Speaking at an event of the Palestine Solidarity Movement in February 2026, Shahin referred to Jeffrey Epstein’s private island as "a symbol of the headquarters of the Zionists who are trying to control the world." Shahin remained an officially-endorsed candidate.

In March 2026, The Daily Telegraph reported that party activists referred to Jewish people as "an abomination to this planet" in 'Greens for Palestine' group chat on WhatsApp.

In April 2026, the party suspended Tony Greenstein, citing a "documented history of anti-Semitism". The party's council decided to expel him the following month. Greenstein has been expelled from the Labour Party in 2018 after he was found to have violated the party rules regarding "prejudicial" or "grossly detrimental" conduct, writing about "Zio idiots", "Zionist scum" and arguing that "Zionists collaborated with the Nazis".

Following the Golders Green stabbings in late April 2026, Waltham Forest candidate, Brian Capaloff, was investigated by the Party for allegedly using an anonymous X account to post incendiary comments. Also in April 2026, Blackheath party candidate Dr. Rebecca Jones repeatedly targeted 'Zios' a term popularised by the far-right and Ku Klux Klan's David Duke. She also called on people to 'burn Zionism to the ground', and posted that Bob Vylan's Glastonbury festival chant 'Death, death to the IDF' was 'amazing'. Listening to the will and testament of Yahya Sinwar, Hamas leader behind the October 7th attacks and massacres in Israel she said 'This is so beautiful'.

At the beginning of May 2026, during the 2026 local election campaign, The Times of Israel reported that the party was investigating over thirty council candidates for alleged antisemitism. During that time, comments on social media which were previously made by Stoke Newington Green Party council member Ifhat Shaheen resurfaced, including a response to a post alleging that Israel had harvested organs from a corpse in which she asked: "are they trying to use the organs to help alter DNA of Zionists to claim land, ancestory [sic]?". Following the Hatzola arson attack of ambulances in Golden Green, Shaheen posted "since Golders Green is now in the news, I want to take the opportunity to make people aware that the Jewish community in North London host IDF soldiers in their synagogues and raise funds for the IDF during a ‘family fun day’.’ Also following the Hatzola arson attack, Camden candidate, Aziz Hakimi, allegedly reposted content claiming that Israel was behind the attack. He was suspended from the party as a result. According to The Standard, in a post made in 2021 Hakimi described Keir Starmer as "Israeli poppet" [sic], and also shared a post encouraging Muslims not to smoke, claiming that doing so helps "funding the Jews to kill our brothers."

Also during May 2026, the party faced backlash after Tina Ion, a Newcastle candidate, made several hateful and antisemitic posts on social media from an Anne Frank parody account. Posts included "every single Zionist" should be killed, descriptions of "Zionists" as "vermin" and "rats", and an image of an industrial shredding machine, referred to by the candidate as a "Zionist juicer." In other posts, Ion referred to "Jewish Nazis" as "money grubbing thieves" who "have built mountains of money over centuries". Several lawmakers of the Green Party condemned Ion's comments in a joint statement saying "We are appalled by the racist material written and shared by Tina Ion ... We are anti-racists and are clear that antisemitism has no place in our party or society. We do not support her candidacy". In a Facebook post, Ion rejected accusations of antisemitism but also acknowledged her use of "dehumanising language".

Crystal Palace & Upper Norwood candidate, Mark Adderley, was suspended by the Party over sharing social media posts, comparing Israel to Nazi Germany, and for blaming Israel for carrying out terror attacks against Jews, such as the arson of Hatzola ambulances in Golders Green blamed on Israel's Prime Minister Benjamin Netanyahu. Adderley also called Israel "the biggest threat to the sovereignty of every nation on this planet", referred to Jewish people as "a cult" and speculated that Charlie Kirk was killed by Mossad or the CIA. Adderley denied promoting antisemitic tropes and conspiracy theories and condemned the party for suspending him. The party did not rescinded his membership and endorses him on Instagram despite the suspension in a comment later deleted. Adderley was elected as a councillor in May 2026.

Two other Lambeth borough (London) candidates, Sabine Mariey and Saiqa Ali, were arrested on suspicion of inciting racial hatred online over allegedly antisemitic posts. In 2001 Ali's posted "Israel creates false flag attack on US soil". In an Instagram account now made private, Ali posted an image of an armed man wearing a Hamas headband with the slogan: "Resistance is freedom", shared a poster arguing that American President Donald Trump is "owned by Jews" and a caricature of a crying Jewish Israeli with the text: "Don’t you know the rules?? We went through the Holocaust and now we get to kill everyone, forever!!" Ali also posted a picture of the world squeezed by a snake with the Israeli flag, to which Ali added: "It’s time to cut the head of [sic] this snake." Ali also posted that "Today England has a government overrepresented with Zionists Jews [sic] and it appears they care more for Israel than England". Ali also shared a caricature of a little girl asking her mom why won't American politicians end the 'Gaza Holocaust' to this her mom responded 'Because Israel is blackmailing them with the Epstein files'. Ali was suspended by the party following the arrest. Ali issued an apology and her name was removed from the Green party's website's list of candidates.

Mairey shared a post with the text "Ramming a synagogue isn’t antisemitism. It’s revenge" and a post comparing Israel to Nazi Germany, saying "the Israeli society enjoying the annihilation and displacement of Gazans by watching and blocking food trucks, whilst the Nazis had to hide what they were doing." Mairey was not mentioned on the party's website and was unsuccessful in the May 2026 election.

Havering candidate Tope Olawoyin withdrew from the May 2026 council elections after sharing a social media conspiracy theory post. In her now private X account, she suggested that Jews were behind the 2026 Hatzola arson attack.

=== Party response ===
In April 2026, in an interview to Haaretz, party leader Zack Polanski stated he was concerned about rising antisemitism, saying of the 2026 London antisemitic attacks "I'm concerned about rising antisemitic attacks. We saw arson attacks on ambulances for instance and we know that increasingly Jewish communities are feeling unsafe. There’s a conversation to be had about whether it’s a perception of unsafety or whether it’s actual unsafety, but neither are acceptable". The comments were criticised as downplaying the rise of antisemitism in the UK. Polanski said that people who see his comments as downplaying antisemitism are "taking me out of context and doing it for their own particular political reasons". In subsequent interviews, Polanski said that while antisemitism exists, pro-Palestinian or "legitimate criticism of an Israeli government which is committing war crimes" are sometimes mistakingly identified as antisemitic speech and that "Where you have 4,500 candidates, to have a handful of cases I would say is not some kind of big scandal".

Former Green leader Caroline Lucas called those statements "totally unacceptable and require immediate action", and that there was "no place for antisemitism or any hate speech in the party".

In late April 2026, The Guardian reported that several individuals affiliated with the Green Party have came forward with concerns regarding "what they say is the recent arrival of members who are vehemently anti-Israel to an extent that crosses into antisemitism, and the difficulties of countering this in a highly decentralised party".

In early May, Polanski said an interview with The Guardian that the party would strengthen candidate vetting procedures and introduce compulsory antisemitism training for candidates. In a BBC interview from around the same time, Polanski condemned antisemitic comments saying "As a Jewish person, those comments disgust me. It’s important that we let the disciplinary process take its place, and that’s exactly what we have" and added, relating to repeated allegations of antisemitism among people affiliated with the Green Party, that "I don’t believe we have a particular problem compared [with] wider society and other political parties."

Deputy leader of the party Mothin Ali recommend members of Greens for Palestine take legal action against the party. Ali advised suspended candidates on how to continue campaigning whilst suspended. A Green Party spokesman said: "The comments were an appeal for people to stay in the party and continue to participate in its internal democracy, seeking legal advice about their individual circumstances, if they wished to."

In May 2026, the party announced plans to strengthen candidate vetting procedures and provide additional training concerning antisemitism and hate speech.

=== Zionism is racism motion ===
At the Green party's 2026 conference, members passed a motion equating Zionism with racism and calling for Israel to be replaced by a single multi-ethnic Palestinian state where both Israelis and Palestinians had equal polical rights. Members rejected an amendment to prevent the motion being used to "pressure, proscribe or discipline members based on affiliation with Jewish community institutions". After the motion was passed, Israel and some UK Jewish groups accused the Green party of racism and antisemitism, while others such as the Jewish Voice for Liberation (JVL) defended the motion and rejected accusations of it being antisemitic, stating, "to call this position antisemitic is an abuse of both Palestinians and Jews". The motion was supported by the prominent Holocaust survivor and activist Stephen Kapos, who said "Zionism both as an ideology and practice is harmful and has no legitimacy and must be rejected". More than a dozen Labour MPs reported the party to Sussex Police and the Equality and Human Rights Commission, and the affiliated European Green Party condemned the motion. Prime Minister and Labour leader Andy Burnham condemned the motion as antisemitic and ruled out a partnership with the Green party as long as it maintains it as policy. A party spokesperson criticised the Labour government for conflating criticism of Israel with antisemitism. Academic and professor, Joseph Massad, who specialises in Middle Eastern studies, agreed that Zionism is racism, saying it is "simply stating historical fact".

While the Jewish Greens were divided on the motion, the group made a statement after the vote stating that neither the policy nor the party are antisemitic and that the Green Party is a welcoming and safe place for Jews.

== Support for the party by Jewish groups ==
In November 2025, The Guardian reported that support for the Green Party and Reform UK by Jews had been rising since the 2024 General Election, with Jewish support for the Tories and Labour historically low, reporting that support for the Green Party has risen by 9% among British Jews.

In 2026, the group Jewish Voice for Liberation stated it supports the Green Party and Zack Polanski against allegations of antisemitism, saying "Zack Polanski is, as JVL always has been, emphatic in separating Jews from responsibility for the actions of the Israeli State"

== Public opinion ==
A May 2026 poll by YouGov found that 63% of Britons considered antisemitism a “major or significant problem” in British society, the highest of 11 groups asked in the survey. Among 2024 Green Party voters, 68% considered antisemitism a major or significant problem in Britain. When asked which parties had an antisemitism problem, 33% of all Britons polled pointed to Reform UK and the Labour Party each, while the Green party received 25%.

== See also ==
- Antisemitism in the British Conservative Party
- Antisemitism in the British Labour Party
- Antisemitism in the United Kingdom
- Islamophobia in the British Conservative Party
- Islamophobia in the British Labour Party
- Islamophobia in the United Kingdom
