= Celsius 7/7 =

2006 book by Michael Gove

- Author: Michael Gove
- Language: English
- Subject: Islamic terrorism
- Published: June 29, 2006
- Publisher: Weidenfeld & Nicolson
- Publication place: United Kingdom
- Pages: 153
- ISBN: 0-297-85146-2

Celsius 7/7 is a book by British Conservative politician Michael Gove about the roots of Islamic terrorism. It was published by Weidenfeld & Nicolson, a subdivision of the Orion Publishing Group, on 29 June 2006.

== Summary ==
In this study, Gove discusses both the emergence of Islamism and the West's response. It distinguishes between "the great historical faith" of Islam which he writes has "brought spiritual nourishment to millions", and Islamism, a "totalitarian ideolog[y]" which turns to "hellish violence and oppression" in a similar way to the 20th century ideologies of Nazism and Communism.

He discusses the factors that led to the development of large-scale Muslim terrorism and how the West has failed to stand up for its liberal values in the face of this pressure, including his analysis of the alliance between Muslim fundamentalists and the Western left.

== Response ==
According to Andrew Pierce, writing for The Daily Telegraph in December 2006, this book has been studied by leading members of the British Government, who have adopted a number of his suggestions. It was positively received by journals like The Times Literary Supplement and Literary Review from terrorism experts Walter Laqueur and Michael Burleigh. Steven Poole in The Guardian called it "remarkably trite" and asked "what universe is Gove living in?" Damian Thompson in The Daily Telegraph wrote that Gove's analysis is rooted in an "essentially Manichaean" world view, which over simplifies the complexities of Islamist terrorism. Although, according to Thompson, Celsius 7/7 provides a useful analysis of Western 'appeasers' of militant Islam, by and large comparing the war on terror to a war against a totalitarian ideology is "misleading, and even dangerous".

Since the book was published, Gove has been accused of harbouring a hostile attitude towards Islam and Muslims. The author William Dalrymple has attacked the book as a "confused epic of simplistic incomprehension" and pointed out that contrary to claims on the book's jacket that Gove was an authority on Islamist terror, he had in fact never lived or travelled in any Islamic country, knew little about Islamic history or theology, and showed no sign of having met or talked to any Muslims. Dalrymple wrote that the book was "riddled with more factual errors and misconceptions than any other text I have come across in two decades of reviewing books on this subject".

Gove was vigorously defended by British authors Melanie Phillips and Stephen Pollard, who rejected Dalrymple's analysis, and Gove himself has replied in The Times.

== See also ==
- Fahrenheit 9/11
- Islamophobia in the UK Conservative Party
