= Greens for Palestine =

British political group

- Abbreviation: Greens4Palestine; G4P
- Formation: January 2024 (2 years ago)
- Region served: England and Wales
- Members: 800+
- Leader: Jo Dowbor; Halima Brewer
- Affiliations: Green Party of England and Wales
- Website: greens4palestine.uk

Greens for Palestine, often shortened to Greens4Palestine, is a British anti-Zionist political organisation formed by members of the Green Party of England and Wales. It first gained prominence in 2024, founded by Halima Brewer and Jo Dowbor, who currently serves as a chair of Young Greens. The pressure group, which holds no formal status in the party or internal elections, is most notable for their introduction of the motion "Zionism is Racism" to two Green Party Conferences in 2026. Their membership includes Green Party co-deputy leader Mothin Ali.

== Ideology ==
Greens for Palestine is a pro-Palestinian group that describes itself as "proudly anti-Zionist". The group believes that Zionism is a form of racism, and supports a one-state solution to the Israeli–Palestinian conflict. Greens for Palestine rejects the existence of Israel as a recognised state, considering the entire nation, not just the Palestinian Occupied Territories, a "settler colony".

Greens for Palestine also considers Cultural Zionism a racist, state-building effort, seemingly due to comments made by founder Ahad Ha'am about a wish for a future state - contrary to the fact that Cultural Zionism as an ideology rejects the idea of a state. Specifically, they suggest the existence of a Jewish cultural centre in Palestine should be rejected as it would have to be imposed on the indigenous population.

== History ==
Greens for Palestine was founded in January 2024 by pro-Palestinian activists including Jo Dowber and Halima Brewer, originally under the name "Green Party BDS group". At this point, the group was responsible for organising marches for Palestine, alongside the Climate Justice Bloc.

By 2025, the group organised, supported and (through leading member Lubna Speitan) proposed the motion "Zionism is Racism", which called for the Green Party to:

1. Declare itself an Anti-Zionist party.
2. Declare support for a one-state solution as official party policy.
3. Identify Zionism as a form of racism that directly led to the Gaza genocide.

The motion was controversial within the party - drawing both support and opposition. The Jewish Greens group were divided on the motion. After the vote the Jewish Greens rejected allegations that the policy makes the Green Party an antisemitic party, maintaining that the party is a welcoming and safe place for Jews and stated that the motion is not antisemitic.

Greens for Palestine rejected the criticisms, saying the motion clearly separated Judaism and Zionism, and would not conflate the two. However, they did not reject the idea that Jewish members could be disciplined for synagogue attendance, responding that "Disciplining the advocacy of a political ideology that mandates ethnic supremacy is a core function of any anti-racist organisation". A later-released booklet by Greens for Palestine suggested that the motion could not be used in its form to enact disciplinary actions, although again it did not reject the suggestion that they should.

In the Green Party of England and Wales's Spring Conference 2026, the motion was raised but was not voted on, due to the debate running out of time. The motion saw much discussion and promotion by Greens for Palestine over the following six months, before it was raised again as the most popular item for the Autumn Conference 2026. The motion passed on 4 October, with 56% of the vote. An alternate motion, Consensus for Palestinian Liberation, which Greens for Palestine had instructed its supporters to vote against, was subsequently not heard. The result caused much public discussion, and resulted in the resignation of several Jewish members and councillors, as well as the Chair of Amnesty International UK's Charity Trust and their former 2021 Bristol mayoral candidate, Sandy Ruthven.

== Controversies ==
In March 2026, Green Party councillor Saiqa Ali was suspended from the party and arrested for inciting racial hatred for social media posts. Her posts included an image of a Hamas fighter with the slogan "Resistance is freedom", noting the Jewish ethnicity of those named in the Epstein Files, claiming that Donald Trump is "owned by Jews" and that the British government is controlled by Zionist Jews, and blaming the 9/11 attacks on Israel. Green candidate Sabine Mairey was also arrested for claiming that "Ramming a synagogue isn't antisemitism. It's revenge". Greens for Palestine posted soon afterwards about this suspension and others, calling them "Zionist smears", and other posts asserting antisemitism-based suspensions were driven by the UK's Israel lobby. Ali spoke at a Greens for Palestine meeting in April about her disciplining. Another candidate who spoke at the meeting was Ifhat Shaheen, whose social media comments included the conspiracy theory that Israel harvests organs from Palestinians, writing “are they trying to use the organs to help alter DNA of Zionists to claim land, ancestory”?

Leaked WhatsApp messages from Greens for Palestine, reported by The Daily Telegraph, showed members describing Jewish people as "an abomination to this planet" and saying Jews "murder, bomb and starve" children.

In April, Greens for Palestine publicly opposed the disciplining of candidate Mark Adderley, who was briefly suspended due to accusations of antisemitism regarding claims of "false flag" attacks on British Jews, and speculation that Mossad was responsible for Charlie Kirk's assassination.

In May, the group's Instagram account reposted a clip of conspiracy-theorist David Icke talking about "Rothchild Zionism". Icke is famous for his endorsement of "The Protocols of the Elders of Zion", a notorious antisemitic text alleging a Jewish plot for world domination.

After the delesection of Green Party candidate for the 2026 Makerfield by-election Chris Kennedy, it was revealed that he had claimed that the 2026 Hatzola arson attack were a "false flag" attack Greens for Palestine responded with a post calling the revelation "smears" and suggesting Green Party leadership had betrayed Kennedy "at the whim of the Zionist lobby". It also questioned whether "the lobby" was in charge of candidate selections, and offered their support for Kennedy.

Greens for Palestine, with support from Mothin Ali, created a support group for those accused of antisemitism. Ali said these — including Kennedy and Ali — that they were "making the right kind of noise". In August, a groupchat created and run by Greens for Palestine senior member Sophus Magill, was criticised for remarks calling British Jews a "brilliant weapon for the Israeli state", and saying that if they were a Palestinian "I might want to plough into a group of [Jewish people] too". Ashley Tubb, senior member of Greens for Palestine, also referred to the Islamic Revolutionary Guard Corps, a proscribed terror group in the UK, as a "part of a national liberation movement" and claiming that Mossad instigated the 2025–2026 Iranian protests.

In September, Greens for Palestine member Eleanora Folan, better known as "Stats for Lefties" online, was suspended for violating the code of conduct in her remarks about fellow party members, and remarks seen to be supportive of the Iranian government.
