= Suliman Gani =

English imam

Suliman Gani is a Muslim community leader, television presenter, and imam from South London.

Gani grew up in South Africa.

In 2010 Gani organised and led a boycott of Ahmadiyya-owned businesses in London. Referring to Ahmadis as Qadianis, Gani stated that because they are "routinely deceptive", Sunni Muslims should boycott businesses owned or operated by them.

In 2016, Gani was said to "oppos[e] homosexuality and believ[e] women should be subservient to men."

In June 2016, Defence secretary Michael Fallon accused Sulaiman Gani as being an ISIS supporter. He was sued for defamation by Gani, who stated he supported Islamic states such as Saudi Arabia, not the terrorist group of that name. Fallon later apologised to Sulaiman Gani and paid him compensation.
