= The Dream of Rome =

2006 non-fiction book by Boris Johnson

The Dream Of Rome
- Author: Boris Johnson
- Language: English
- Genre: Nonfiction
- Publisher: HarperCollins
- Publication date: 28 January 2006
- Publication place: United Kingdom
- Pages: 288 pages
- ISBN: 0-00-722441-9
- OCLC: 67865987

The Dream Of Rome is a 2006 book by Boris Johnson, in which he wrote about the Roman Empire achieving political and cultural unity in Europe, and compares it to what he said is the failure of the European Union to do the same. It was aired as a BBC television documentary prior to its release as a book in the same year.

Johnson said: "How did the Romans manage to bring centuries of stability to so much of Europe while the European Union remains an unloved and divided mess?"

Johnson’s Euroscepticism and deep analysis of the Roman Empire drew an overall positive reception. Critics praised Johnson’s ability to engage the reader with both entertaining jargon and desired information. Controversy surrounding The Dream of Rome was related to Johnson’s comparison of early Christian martyrs to 21st century suicide bombers.

== Synopsis ==
In The Dream of Rome, Johnson compares Ancient Rome to the modern-day European Union, showing that Rome was lightly taxed and free of harsh regulation whereas the EU is bound by bureaucracy and heavily taxed. Johnson explores why such a strong united Roman identity was able to form within the Empire while the EU severely lacks a common identity, opting for strong individual national identities instead. The Guardian focuses on big ideas such as “Harmonisation without regulation," implying that the Roman Empire had a harmony to it, a firm belief of Johnson. One similarity between the Roman Empire and the EU is the existence of “freeloaders,” states Johnson. They are “unlikely to bite the hand that feeds them.” In Rome, these freeloaders were the elites of a newly overpowered society - those that were “seduced” by promises of wealth and glory. Johnson compares this group of people to today’s EU freeloaders and writes that the difference lies within the charisma of the European leader in command. Roman emperors, especially Augustus, formed cult-like followings that galvanized and rallied a population in contrast to today’s mundane European figureheads.

Johnson writes of an innate European desire to recreate the ideals and culture of Ancient Rome. Included within the novel are statements from Johnson describing the success Romans had with assimilating new groups of people (immigrants and those of a conquered separate nation-state) with Roman culture and values. Johnson emphasizes the difference between Rome and the EU in terms of assimilation. The Roman way was to welcome and provide opportunity to any foreigner who desired to adopt the Roman lifestyle. The EU meanwhile, has had, in the eyes of Johnson, no real success in united Europeans. He cites the lack of a common language, literature, and general inclination from many citizens to form closer ties to their neighbors of differing nationalities.

The 2021 French journal, French Victorian and Edwardian Journal (Cahiers Victoriens et Édouardiens), highlights Johnson's opinion of the current EU. Johnson writes emphatically for the implementation of a powerful central force to lead the continent of Europe and unite its nation states. Repeatedly he harkens back to the days of the Empire under the hand of Julius Caesar, the historical leader who assumes the role of Johnson’s hero as the book progresses.

In 2020, Dr. Abelardo Rodriguez of the Universidad Iberoamericana and the San Jose Journal of Strategic Security came to the conclusion that Johnson’s biggest gripe about the current EU at the time of writing was the absence of a strong head of state. A harsh contrast to Roman figureheads.

== Background ==
The book, The Dream of Rome was preceded by a BBC television documentary. The documentary was a fast-paced, two-part series officially named “Boris Johnson and The Dream of Rome.” The documentary featured several interviews conducted by Johnson, including a personal one-on-one with King's College London professor, Charlotte Roueché. Following the airing of the documentary on television, the book was released by Johnson and HarperCollins shortly thereafter.

== Reception ==
Toby Young of the New Statesman said "As an introduction to the history of the Roman empire, this book is hugely stimulating. I read it in two sittings, completely gripped." Craig Brown of The Mail on Sunday said "History comes alive only when written from the heart and Johnson’s is full of swashbuckling japes, bloodthirsty yells and energetic sideswipes." In a 2006 issue of The Daily Telegraph, Tom Holland said "Johnson has not been intimidated by dry classics masters: his style is bright, breezy, populist and pacy." Helen Macdonald of The Times said "Described with his special combination of sharp-eyed intelligence and golly-gosh exclamation…the sublime and the bizarre are richly represented in this portrayal of ancient Rome…a splendid romp through the Roman world."

Other scholars have connected the book to the United Kingdom's 2020 withdrawal from the European Union.

Controversy

Johnson made highly controversial comparisons of early Christians willing to die for their beliefs and today’s suicide bombers, creating dissension within Christian communities.

Seen within his writing, Johnson frequently constructs convincing arguments for Turkey to join the EU, in aspiration of recreating the idealistic vision of a united Euro-centric empire and including the “Rome of the East.” According to The Independent, this argument became problematic when juxtaposed with Johnson’s more recent stance in favor of the British leaving the EU due to the inabilities and limitations of big bureaucracy.
