= HIAS+JCORE =

Jewish organisation

- Founded: 1976
- Type: Non-profit; Charitable organisation
- Purpose: Racial equality, asylum seekers & refugees, education
- Headquarters: London
- Executive Director: David Mason
- Website: hiasjcore.org

HIAS+JCORE (formerly the Jewish Council for Racial Equality, JCORE) is a Jewish organisation which provides a Jewish voice on refugee and asylum issues in the UK.

HIAS+JCORE campaigns on refugee and asylum issues, including drawing connections between racism and the experiences of displaced people, runs projects directly supporting refugees and asylum seekers and works to engage the Jewish community with these issues.

It works with organizations like the CCJO René Cassin, Mitzvah Day International, Refugee Action, The Baobab Centre for Young Survivors, The Children's Society, The Refugee Council and World Jewish Relief.

== History ==
The Jewish Council for Racial Equality was founded in 1976 by Dr. Edie Friedman. Originally named the Jewish Social Responsibility Council (JSRC), it was renamed in 1994, becoming The Jewish Council for Racial Equality (JCORE). Dr. Friedman wanted to create an organization that would give “full expression to the concern, as Jews, for justice both in the UK and in the Third World." As the JSRC developed, it began to focus on specific areas such as education of the Jewish community, developing black-Jewish dialogue, and working with refugees.

In December 2022, Rabbi David Mason of Muswell Hill Synagogue was appointed as executive director of HIAS+JCORE, a partnership combining the work of the Hebrew Immigrant Aid Society or HIAS and the Jewish Council for Racial Equality in the UK. The new combined entity was launched at an event in March 2023 and celebrated its first anniversary in 2024.

== Mission ==
HIAS+JCORE states that its mission is to support refugees and asylum seekers and to oppose xenophobia and racism. The organization also advocates for communities in which refugees are safe and welcomed.

== Work ==
=== Campaigning ===
HIAS+JCORE advocates for a fairer, more compassionate asylum policy. It shares a Jewish valued-led approach to politicians and policy makers, and also brings Jewish representation to campaign coalitions like Families Together, Lift the Ban, and Together With Refugees. The organisation also works to challenge the racism and xenophobia asylum seekers and refugees face and is a member of the Alliance for Racial Justice.

=== Practical support ===
The charity works directly to support refugees and asylum seekers in the United Kingdom. This is primarily done through its JUMP befriending project, which was launched in 2007.

=== Community engagement ===
HIAS+JCORE works across the Jewish community, seeking to encourage engagement with refugee and asylum issues. This includes education sessions, facilitating volunteering opportunities, and encouraging activism.
