= Green Party of England and Wales =

Political party

Green Party of England and Wales Plaid Werdd Lloegr a Chymru
- Abbreviation: GPEW
- Leader: Zack Polanski
- Deputy Leaders: Rachel Millward; Mothin Ali
- House of Commons Leader: Ellie Chowns
- Founded: July 1990; 36 years ago (Note: November 1972 (as PEOPLE); 1975 (as Ecology Party); June 1985 (as Green Party); July 1990 (as Green Party of England and Wales))
- Preceded by: Green Party (UK)
- Headquarters: PO Box 78066, London SE16 9GQ
- Youth wing: Young Greens of England and Wales
- LGBT wing: LGBTIQA+ Greens
- Membership (October 2026): 213,000
- Ideology: Green politics; Progressivism; Factions: Anti-capitalism; Eco-socialism
- Political position: Left-wing
- European affiliation: European Green Party
- International affiliation: Global Greens
- Colours: Green
- Devolved branches: Wales Green Party; London Green Party
- House of Commons: 5 / 575 (England and Wales)
- House of Lords: 2 / 796
- Senedd: 2 / 96
- London Assembly: 3 / 25
- Strategic authority mayors: 0 / 14
- Directly elected local authority mayors: 2 / 13
- Councillors: 1,300 / 17,403 (England and Wales)
- Councils led: 21 / 338 (England and Wales)

Election symbol

Website
- greenparty.org.uk

The Green Party of England and Wales (GPEW; Welsh: Plaid Werdd Lloegr a Chymru), often known simply as the Greens, is a green and left-wing political party in England and Wales. Led by Zack Polanski since 2025, the party has five MPs in the House of Commons, two members of the House of Lords, around 1,300 councillors at the local government level and three members of the London Assembly.

The party's ideology combines environmentalism with left-wing economic policies, including well-funded and locally controlled public services. It supports proportional representation, LGBTQ rights, drug policy reform, and public ownership. It is split into various regional divisions, including the semi-autonomous Wales Green Party and is internationally affiliated with the Global Greens and the European Green Party.

In 1990, what was then the UK-wide Green Party – which had initially been established as the PEOPLE Party in 1973 – divided into the Green Party of England and Wales, the Scottish Greens and the Green Party Northern Ireland. Since 1990, they have been three completely separate and unique political parties, with their own separate leaders, memberships and policies. The Green Party of England and Wales went through centralising reforms spearheaded by the Green 2000 group in early 1991; they also sought to emphasise growth in local governance, doing so throughout 1990. In 2010, the party gained its first member of Parliament in its then leader Caroline Lucas, although Plaid Cymru's Cynog Dafis was elected as a joint Plaid Cymru–Green Party candidate in 1992. As the party's support is spread out across England and Wales and has rarely been found in electorally significant clusters, the party held only one seat in the House of Commons from 2010 to 2019, before reaching four seats in 2024. The Green Party supports replacing the UK's first-past-the-post voting system with proportional representation, which would grant all parties a share of seats in Parliament based on their national vote share.

== History ==
=== Origins (1972–1990) ===
The Green Party of England and Wales has its origins in the PEOPLE Party, which was founded in Coventry in November 1972. It was renamed the Ecology Party in 1975; in 1985, the party changed its name to the Green Party. In 1989, the party's Scottish branch evolved to establish the independent Scottish Green Party, while the Green Party in Northern Ireland is a northern branch of the Green Party of the Republic of Ireland, leaving the branches in England and Wales to form their own party. The Green Party of England and Wales is registered with the Electoral Commission, only as "Green Party". In the 1989 European Parliament elections, the Green Party received 15% of the vote with 2.3 million votes, the best performance of a "green" party in a nationwide election. This election gave the Green Party the third-largest share of the vote after the Conservative and Labour parties; because of the first-past-the-post voting system, however, it failed to gain a seat. Many say the success of the party is due to increased respect for environmentalism and the effects of the development boom in southern England in the late 1980s.

=== Early years (1990–2008) ===
Seeking to capitalise on the Greens' success in the European Parliament elections, a group named Green 2000 was established in July 1990, arguing for an internal reorganisation of the party to develop it into an active electoral force capable of securing seats in the House of Commons. Its proposed reforms included a more centralised structure, the replacement of the existing party council with a smaller party executive, and the establishment of delegate voting at party conferences. Many party members opposed the reforms, believing that they would undermine the party's internal democracy and, amid the arguments, some members left the party. Although Green 2000 proposals were defeated at the party's 1990 conference, they were overwhelmingly carried at their 1991 conference, resulting in an internal restructuring of the party.

Between the end of 1990 and mid-1992, the party lost over half its members, with surveys indicating that frustration over a lack of clear and effective party leadership was a significant reason in their decision. The party fielded more candidates than it had ever done before in the 1992 general election but performed poorly, although it did win its first seat with the election of Cynog Dafis in Ceredigion and Pembroke North, who stood on a joint ticket with Plaid Cymru. In 1993, the party adopted its "Basis for Renewal" program in an attempt to bring together conflicting factions and thus saved the party from bankruptcy and potential demise. The party sought to escape its reputation as an environmentalist single-issue party by placing greater emphasis on social policies.

Recognising their poor performance in the 1992 national election, the party decided to focus on gaining support in local elections, targeting wards where there was a pre-existing support base of Green activists. In 1993, future party leader and MP Caroline Lucas gained a seat in Oxfordshire County Council, with other gains following in the 1995 and 1996 local elections. The Greens sought to build alliances with other parties in the hope of gaining representation at the parliamentary level. In Wales, the Greens endorsed Plaid Cymru candidate Cynog Dafis in the 1992 general election, having worked with him on several environmental initiatives. and he was duly elected on a joint ticket. For the 1997 general election, the Ceredigion branch of the Greens endorsed Dafis as a joint Plaid Cymru/Green candidate, but this generated controversy with the party, with critics believing it improper to build an alliance with a party that did not share all of the Greens' views. In April 1995, the Green National Executive ruled that the party should withdraw from this alliance due to ideological differences.

As the Labour Party shifted to the political centre under the leadership of Tony Blair and his New Labour project, the Greens sought to gain the support of the party's disaffected leftists. During the 1999 European Parliament elections, the first to be held in the UK using proportional representation, the Greens gained their first Members of the European Parliament (MEPs), Caroline Lucas (South East England) and Jean Lambert (London). At the inaugural London Assembly elections in 2000, the party gained 11% of the vote and returned three Assembly Members (AMs). Although this dropped to two following the 2004 London Assembly elections, the Green AMs proved vital in passing the annual budget of former Mayor Ken Livingstone. At the 2001 general election, they received 0.7% of the vote and gained no seats. At the 2004 European Parliamentary elections, the party returned two MEPs the same as in 1999; overall, the party received 1,033,093 votes. In the 2005 general election, the party received more than 1% of the vote for the first time and more than 10% in the constituencies of Brighton Pavilion and Lewisham Deptford. This growth was due in part to the increasing public visibility of the party as well as growth in support for smaller parties in the UK.

=== Caroline Lucas (2008–2012) ===
Lucas speaking as the first Leader of the Green Party at its autumn conference in 2008

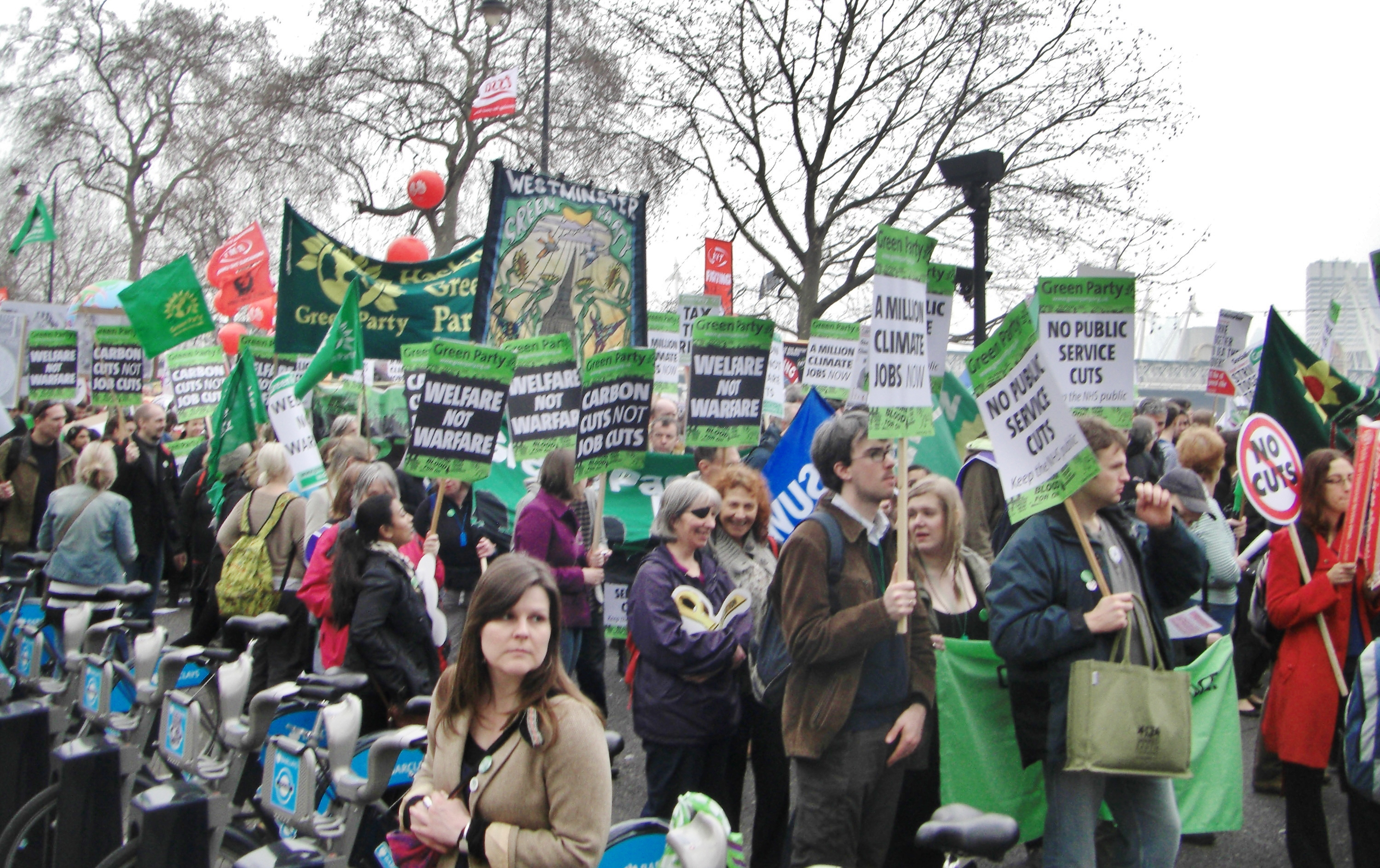
Green Party protestors marching against government cuts in 2011

In November 2007, the party held an internal referendum to decide on whether it should replace its use of two "principal speakers", one male and the other female, with the more conventional roles of "leader" and "deputy leader"; the motion passed with 73% of the vote. In September 2008, the party then elected its first leader, Caroline Lucas, with Adrian Ramsay elected deputy leader. In the party's first election with Lucas as leader, it retained both its MEPs in the 2009 European elections.

In the 2010 general election, the party returned its first MP. Lucas was returned as MP for the seat of Brighton Pavilion. Following the election, Keith Taylor succeeded her as MEP for South East England. They also saved their deposit in Hove, and Brighton Kemptown. In the 2011 local government elections in England and Wales, the Green Party in Brighton and Hove took minority control of the City Council by winning 23 seats, five short of an overall majority. At the 2012 local government elections, the Green Party gained five seats and retained both AMs at the 2012 London Assembly election. At the 2012 London mayoral election, the party's candidate Jenny Jones finished third; she lost her deposit.

=== Natalie Bennett (2012–2016) ===
In May 2012, Lucas announced that she would not seek re-election to the post of party leader. In September, Australian-born former journalist Natalie Bennett was elected party leader and Will Duckworth deputy leader in the leadership election took place. Bennett would take the party further to the left, aiming to make it an anti-austerity party to the left of the Labour Party. The 2013 local government elections saw overall gains of five seats. The party returned representation for the first time on the councils of Cornwall, Devon, and Essex. At the local government elections the following year, the Greens gained 18 seats overall. In London, the party won four seats, a gain of two. It held seats in Camden and Lewisham, and gaining seats in Islington and Lambeth. In 2013, there were allegations of factionalism and infighting in the party between liberal, socialist, and eco-anarchist factions.

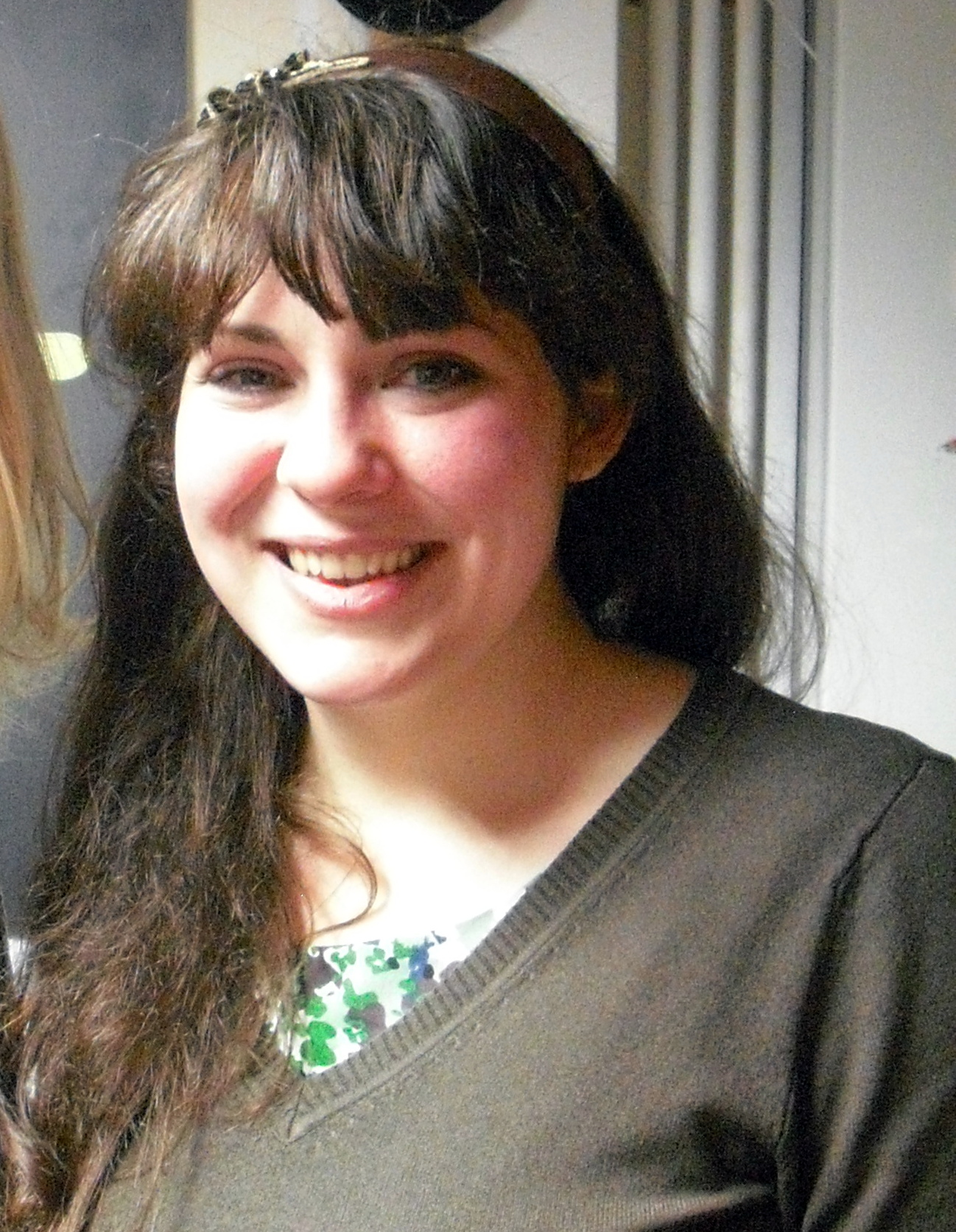
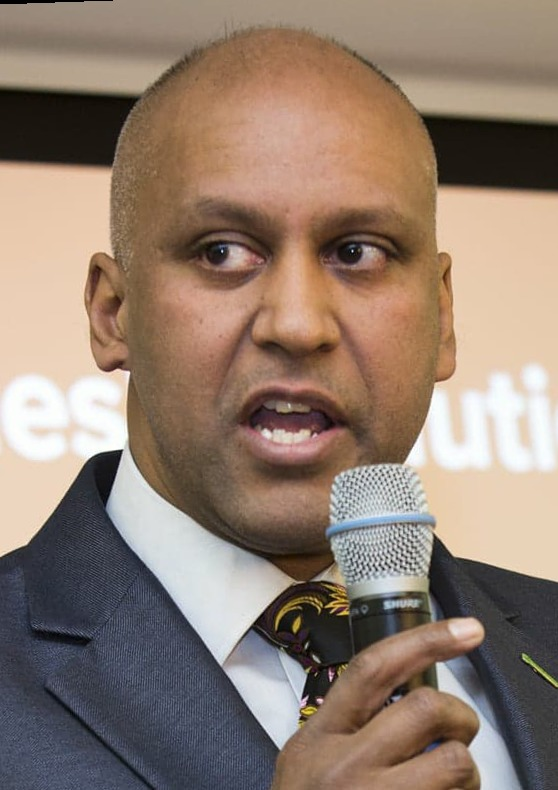
Womack and Ali were voted deputy leaders in 2014. Ali served as a deputy leader until 2016 and Womack until 2022.

At the 2014 European elections, the Green Party finished fourth, above the Liberal Democrats, winning more than 1.2 million votes. The party also increased its European Parliament representation, gaining one seat in the South West England region. In September 2014, the Green Party held its 2014 leadership elections. Incumbent leader Bennett ran uncontested and retained her status as a party leader. The election also saw a change in the elective format for the position of deputy leader. The party opted to elect two, gender-balanced deputy leaders, instead of one. Amelia Womack and Shahrar Ali won the two positions, succeeding former deputy leader Duckworth.

In the 2010 general election, the Green Party contested roughly 50% of seats. The party announced in October 2014 that Green candidates would be standing for parliament in at least 75% of constituencies in the 2015 general election. Following its rapid increase in membership and support, the Green Party also announced it was targeting twelve key seats for the 2015 general election: its one current seat, Brighton Pavilion, held by Lucas since 2010, Norwich South, a Liberal Democrat seat where June 2014 polling put the Greens in second place behind Labour, Bristol West, another Liberal Democrat seat, where they targeted the student vote, St. Ives, where they received an average of 18% of the vote in county elections, Sheffield Central, Liverpool Riverside, Oxford East, Solihull, Reading East, and three more seats with high student populations – York Central, Cambridge, and Holborn and St. Pancras, where leader Bennett stood as the candidate.

In December 2014, the Green Party announced that it had more than doubled its overall membership from 1 January that year to 30,809. This reflected the increase seen in opinion polls in 2014, with Green Party voting intentions trebling from 2–3% at the start of the year, to 7–8% at the end of the year, on many occasions, coming in fourth place with YouGov's national polls, ahead of the Liberal Democrats, and gaining more than 25% of the vote among 18-to-24-year-olds. This rapid increase in support for the party was referred to by media as the "Green Surge". The hashtag "#GreenSurge" also became popular on social media (such as Twitter) from Green Party members and supporters and, as of 15 January 2015, the combined Green Party membership in the UK stood at 44,713; greater than the number of members of UKIP (at 41,943), and the Liberal Democrats (at 44,576).

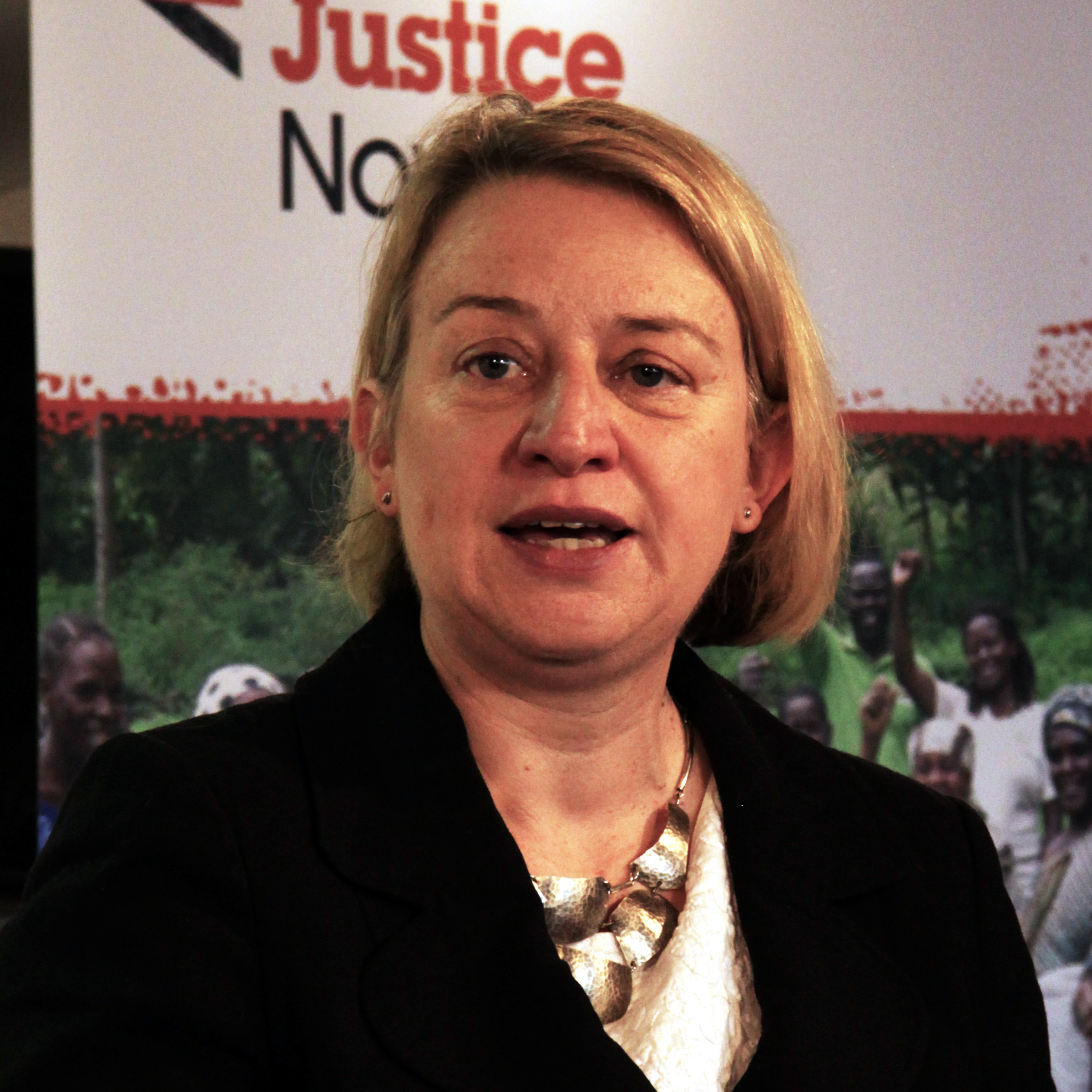
Natalie Bennett in 2015

Views subsequently fell back as the 2015 general election opinion polls arrived: a Press Association poll of polls on 3 April, for example, put the Greens fifth with 5.4%. Membership statistics continued to surge, with the party attaining 60,000 in England and Wales that April. At the 2015 general election, Lucas was re-elected in Brighton Pavilion with an increased majority, but the party did not win any other seats. In part due to the greatly increased the number of contested seats of 538 from the 310 at the 2010 election, the Greens received their highest-ever vote share (more than 1.1 million votes), and increased their national share of the vote from 1% to 3.8%. Overnight, the membership numbers increased to more than 63,000. At the local government elections the party lost 9 out of their 20 seats on the Brighton and Hove council, losing minority control. Nationwide, the Greens increased their share of councillors, gaining an additional 10 council seats while failing to gain overall control of any individual council.

=== Lucas and Bartley (2016–2018) ===
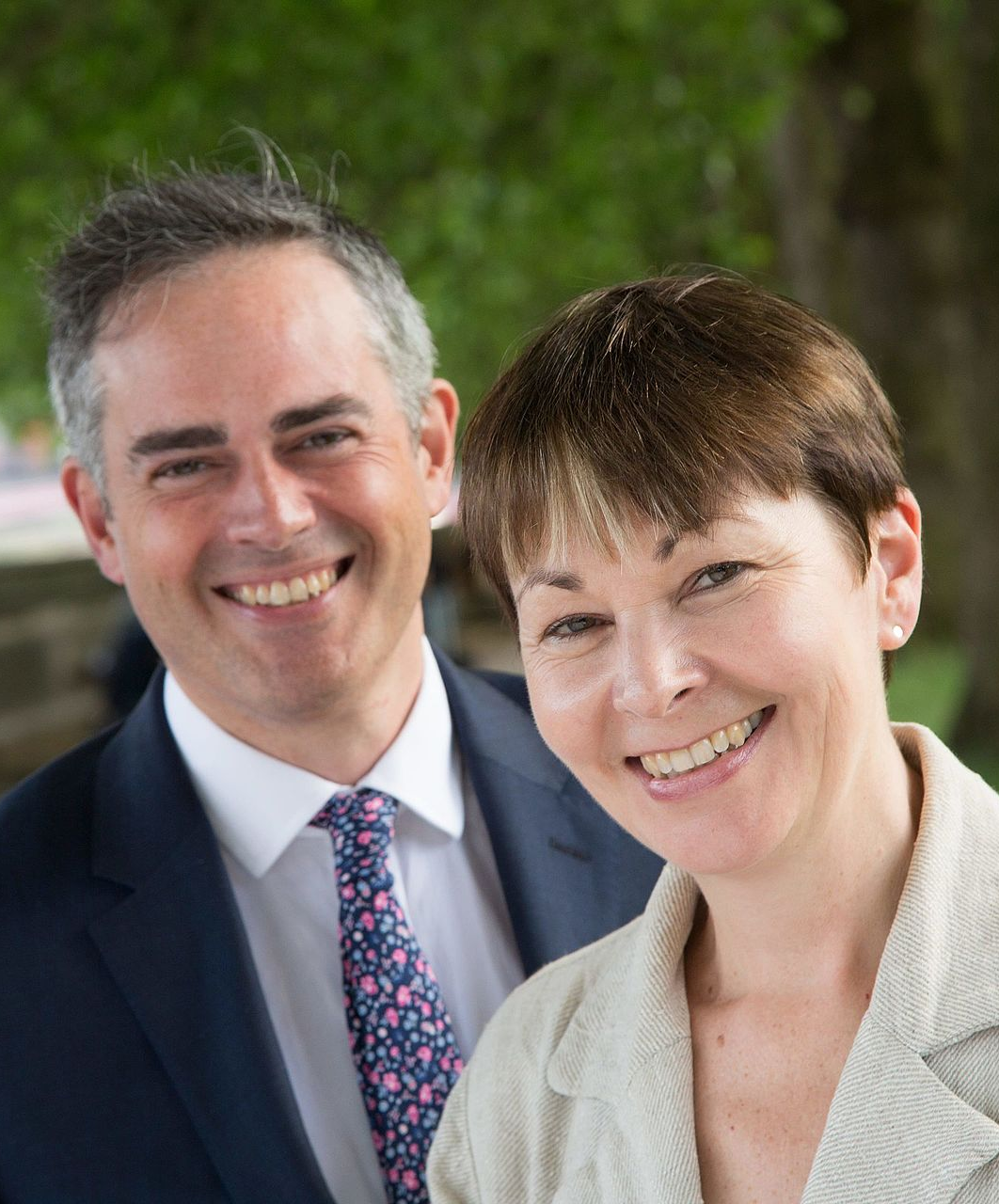
Caroline Lucas and Jonathan Bartley in 2017

On 15 May 2016, Bennett announced she would not be standing for re-election in the party's biennial leadership election due to take place in the summer. Former leader Lucas and Jonathan Bartley announced two weeks later that they intended to stand for leadership in a job-share arrangement. Nominations closed at the end of June, with the campaign period taking place in July and voting period in August and the results announced at the party's Autumn Conference in Birmingham from 2–4 September. It was announced on 4 September that Lucas and Bartley would become the party's leaders in a job share.

Lucas first suggested "progressive pacts" to work on a number of issues including combating climate change and for electoral reform, following the results of the 2015 general election. She then reiterated the call alongside Bartley as they announced their plan to share the leadership of the party. Following the vote to leave the European Union in June 2016, Bennett published an open letter, calling for an "anti-Brexit alliance" potentially comprising Labour, the Liberal Democrats and Plaid Cymru to stand in a future snap election in English and Welsh seats.

The Green Party stood in 457 seats in the 2017 general election, securing 1.6% of the overall vote, and an average of 2.2% in seats it stood in. While it was a disappointing result after the 2015 success, this was still the second-best Green result in a general election, and Brighton Pavilion remained Green with an increased majority. On 30 May 2018, Lucas announced she would not seek re-election in the 2018 Green Party of England and Wales leadership election and would stand down as co-leader. On 1 June 2018, Bartley announced a co-leadership bid alongside Siân Berry, former candidate for the Mayor of London in 2008 and 2016.

=== Bartley and Berry (2018–2021) ===
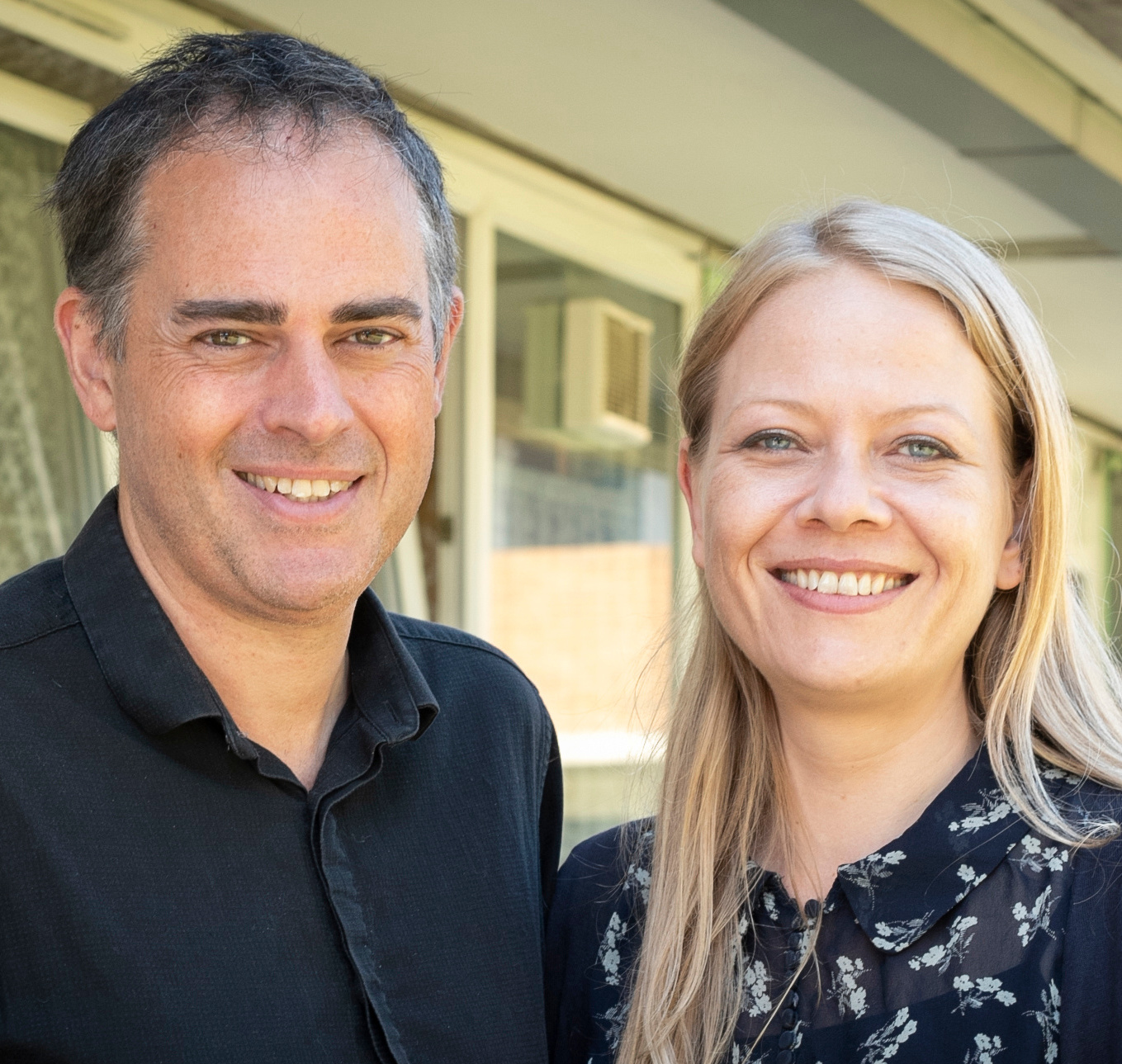
Siân Berry and Jonathan Bartley in 2018

Bartley and Berry were elected as co-leaders in September 2018, winning 6,279 of 8,329 votes. In the 2019 local elections, the Green Party secured their best ever local election result, more than doubling their number of council seats from 178 to 372 councillors. This success was followed by a similarly successful European election where Greens won (including Scottish Greens and the Green Party in Northern Ireland) more than two million votes for the first time since 1989, securing 7 MEPs, up from 3. This included winning seats for the first time in the East of England, North West England, West Midlands and Yorkshire & the Humber. The membership also saw another climb in 2019, returning to 50,000 members in September.

In September 2020, it was announced that Bartley and Berry had won re-election for another two-year term. In the 2021 local elections, the Green Party gained their first ever councillors in Northumberland and Stockport, as well as making significant gains in Suffolk and Sheffield. In total 88 seats were gained, challenging the Liberal Democrats to become England's third-largest party. In July 2021, Bartley announced that he would stand down at the end of the month to give the party time to choose new leadership before the next general election. This triggered the 2021 Green Party of England and Wales leadership election. Berry remained as acting leader, but said she would not stand in the leadership election following disagreements within the party.

=== Denyer and Ramsay (2021–2025) ===
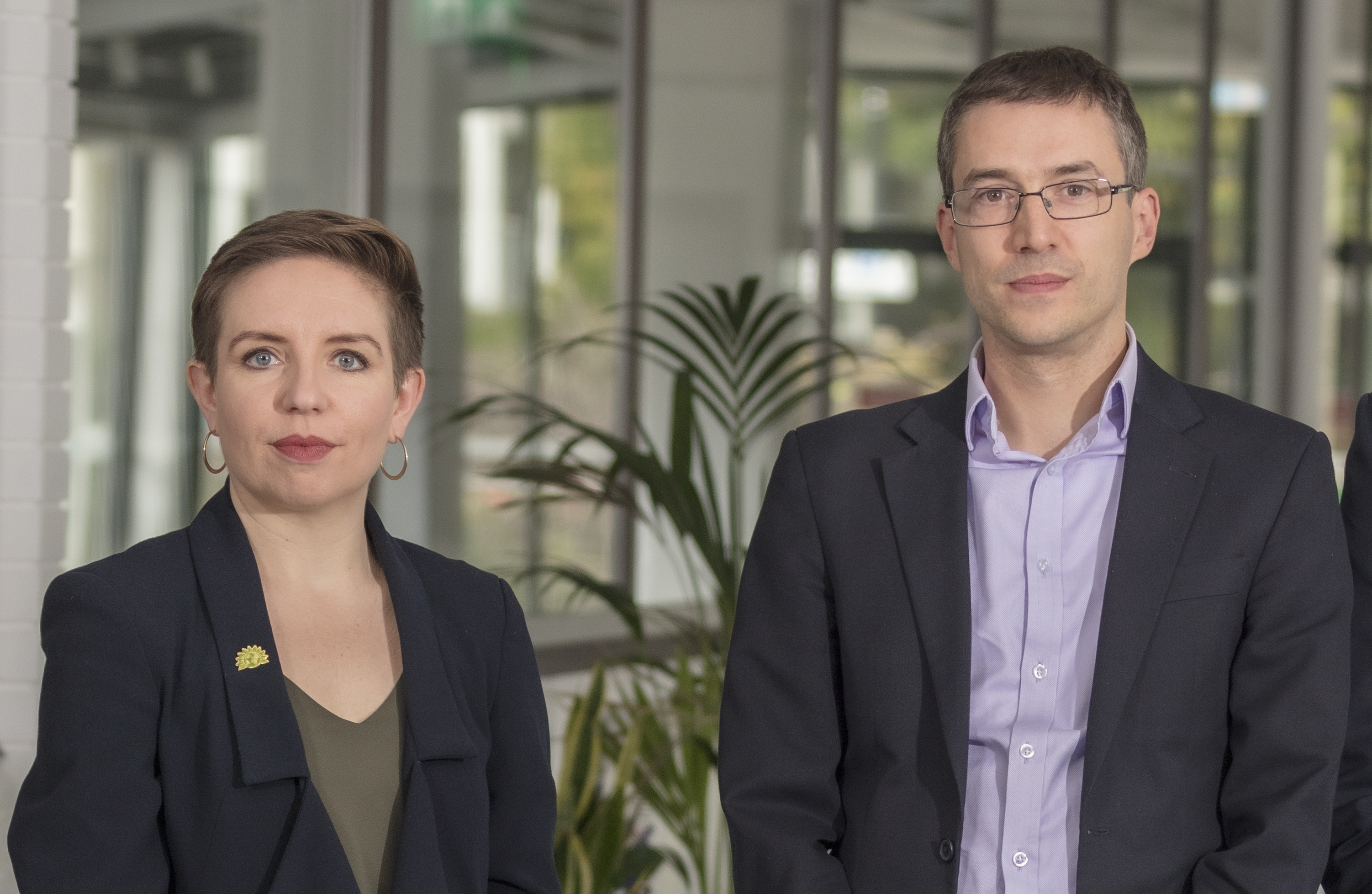
Carla Denyer and Adrian Ramsay in October 2022

The Bristol councillor Carla Denyer and the former deputy leader Adrian Ramsay were elected as co-leaders on 1 October 2021. Ramsay stated that "People are looking for a positive alternative to the establishment parties, and finding it in the Greens"; in the first national electoral test of the new leadership in the 2022 local elections the Green Party made a net gain of 71 seats – including in both Conservative and Labour "safe seats". On 7 September 2022, it was announced that Zack Polanski had been elected as the party's new deputy leader, defeating three election opponents and replacing Amelia Womack, who chose not to re-stand for the position in the election.

In October 2022, at the national conference of the Scottish Greens, that party voted to suspend ties with the Green Party of England and Wales, partly over the issue of transphobia. In response, the Green Party of England and Wales said that trans rights are human rights, that it has strong policies of trans inclusion and that a goal of the party is to be welcoming, inclusive and promote diversity. The party also said it would continue to support the rights of trans people, women and oppressed groups. The LGBTIQA+ Greens also responded by saying it would "continue to fight transphobia".

At the 2023 local elections, the Green Party gained more than 200 councillors across England, and won majority control of Mid Suffolk District Council, the party's first ever council majority. Despite losing control of Brighton and Hove City Council, the Greens became the largest party on East Hertfordshire District Council, Warwick District Council, and Lewes District Council. 2023 saw the party's best ever results in a local election.

In the 2024 local elections, the Greens aimed to make gains in Stroud, Hastings and Worcester. In the south west the Greens became the largest party on Bristol City Council failing to win an outright majority by a single seat. They made a breakthrough in Northern England by winning their first ever seats on Newcastle City Council and Sefton Council. It was noted that the Greens benefited from anger at Labour over the Israel–Gaza war when they won their first seat on Bolton Council. After gaining 74 seats across England and increasing their total to 812, the Greens hailed 2024 as their best ever local election result.

On 8 June 2023, the Green Party's only MP, Caroline Lucas, announced she would not be standing for re-election at the 2024 general election. Former party co-leader Siân Berry stood as the Green candidate in Brighton Pavilion. Along with Brighton Pavilion, the Greens targeted three other seats in the general election: Bristol Central, Waveney Valley and North Herefordshire. In what became the Greens' best general election to date, Berry held Brighton Pavilion, while Denyer gained Bristol Central, defeating Labour incumbent and Shadow Culture Secretary Thangam Debbonaire; Ramsay won Waveney Valley, a notional gain from the Conservatives, and Ellie Chowns won North Herefordshire, defeating Conservative incumbent Bill Wiggin.

=== Zack Polanski (2025–present) ===
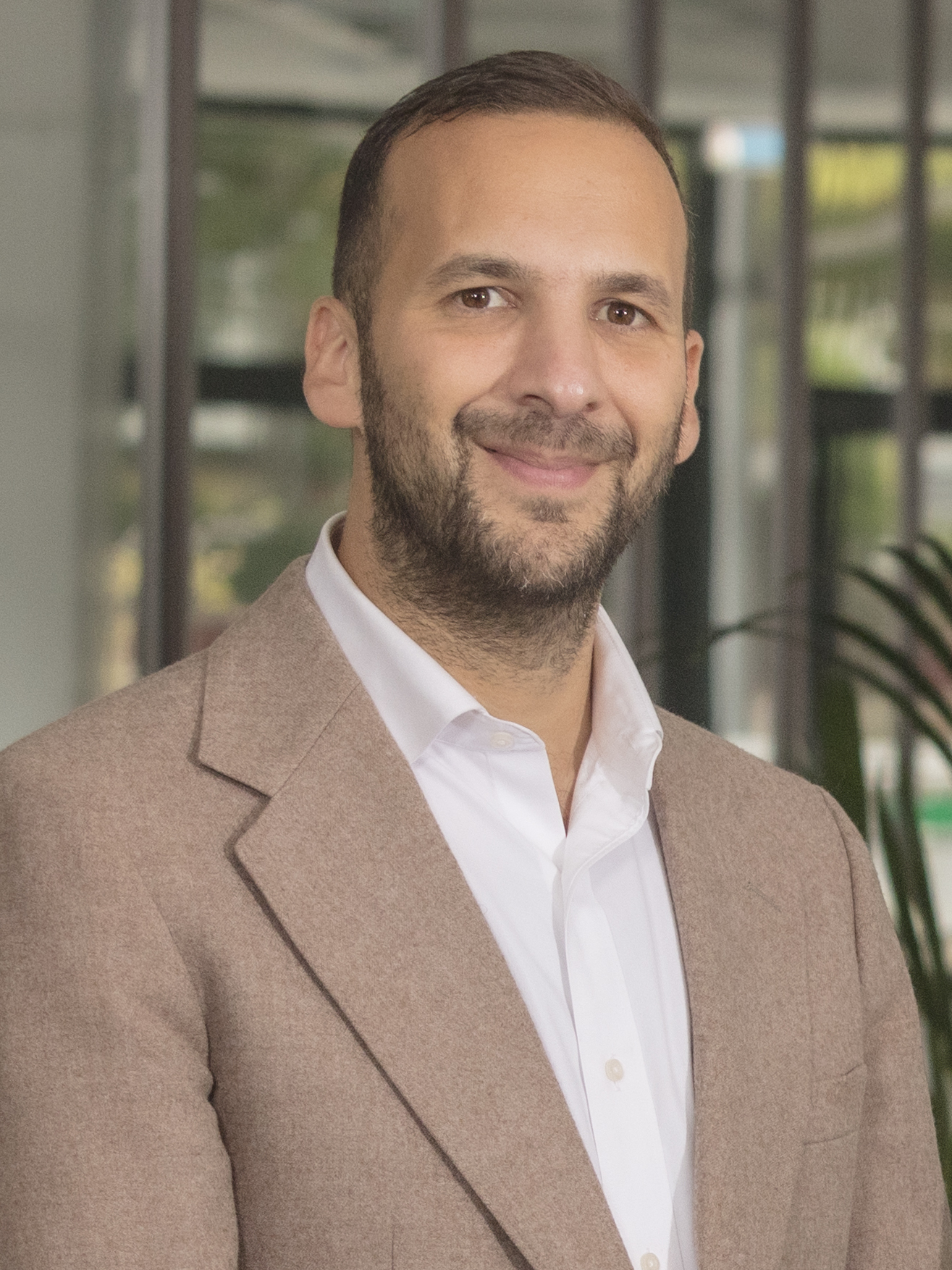
Zack Polanski in 2023

Carla Denyer stepped down as Green Party co-leader to focus on her MP role, as leadership nominations opened on 2 June 2025 with voting running through August 2025. Deputy leader Zack Polanski launched his bid, calling for a bolder party approach. The results were announced on 2 September 2025, with Polanski winning the leadership by a landslide, with 84.1% of the vote, and marking the first time an incumbent leader of the Green Party was defeated in a leadership election. On the same day, the membership of the Green Party was announced to have grown to 68,500 members, its highest on record.

On 15 October, the New Statesman reported that the party had grown to 110,000 members, with its membership having grown by 55% since Polanski's election as leader. Four days later, membership hit 130,000, taking the Greens ahead of the Conservatives. On 9 December, membership was at 180,000 members. As of 17 December, membership stood at 184,000 members. Under Polanski's leadership, there have been multiple defections of Labour councillors to the Greens, the largest of which being the defection of 5 Labour councillors from Brent London Borough Council, including the chief whip and a former cabinet member, in December 2025. The party also earned defections from prominent former Labour politicians, including former Brighton Kemptown MP Lloyd Russell-Moyle and former Mayor of the North of Tyne Jamie Driscoll. In December 2025, a poll found Polanski was the most popular party leader in the UK, holding an approval rating of −1, compared to Nigel Farage's rating of −12 and Keir Starmer's rating of −43.

On 26 February 2026, the party won its first by-election in Gorton and Denton, with Hannah Spencer being elected with 41% of the vote and a majority of over 4,000. The Green Party had previously never won more than 10% of the vote at a parliamentary by-election. The week after the by-election, a poll by YouGov showed the Green Party on 21%, second place and two points behind Reform. This was the highest polling ever recorded for the party.

In 2026, allegations of antisemitism in the Green Party were reported and became a focus of controversy within the party. More than 30 candidates in the 2026 United Kingdom local elections were accused of sharing antisemitic content online, of whom almost a dozen were suspended during the campaign. Two candidates were arrested and charged with inciting racial hatred over their social media posts. The allegations generated conflicting responses within the party, with former leader Caroline Lucas calling for immediate action against candidates whose antisemitic social media posts had come to light, while deputy leader Mothin Ali called for legal action against the party over candidates' suspensions.

Zack Polanski's response to the allegations, and to antisemitic attacks in the run-up to the local election became a focus of media attention. Polanski's questioning of "whether it's a perception of unsafety or whether it's actual unsafety", and his criticism of police use of force in arresting the perpetrator of the Golders Green stabbings, led to backlash.

In the 2026 local elections, the Greens won 587 council seats, an increase of 441 and the single largest increase in councillors the party has ever had. This election saw the party take control of several councils in London, as well as Norwich and Hastings, and also winning its first mayoralties in Hackney and Lewisham. At the 2026 Senedd election, held on the same day, the Welsh Green Party had its first two members of the Senedd. Following this, the BBC projected that the party would win 18% of the vote in a general election.

At the party conference in October 2026, the Greens adopted a policy motion entitled "Zionism is Racism". The motion designates Zionism as a racist ideology, arguing that it "privileges one ethnic group on the basis of the subjugation of others". The motion calls for Israel to be replaced by a single, democratic Palestinian state "with equal rights for all". The members who voted on the motion turned down an amendment that would have prevented party members from being pressured, proscribed or disciplined "based on affiliation with Jewish community institutions" taking a Zionist stance, including synagogues. Some British Jewish groups, Israeli officials, Prime Minister Andy Burnham, and the leaders of the Conservative Party, Kemi Badenoch and Liberal Democrats, Ed Davey accused the Green Party of antisemitism after the motion was passed. Four of the five Green MPs opposed the motion. A party spokesperson criticised the Labour government for conflating criticism of Israel with antisemitism. The motion was endorsed by the prominent Holocaust survivor and activist Stephen Kapos, who said "Zionism both as an ideology and practice is harmful and has no legitimacy and must be rejected". The Jewish Voice for Liberation (JVL) also defended the motion and rejected accusations of it being antisemitic, stating, "to call this position antisemitic is an abuse of both Palestinians and Jews". Academic and professor, Joseph Massad, who specialises in Middle Eastern studies, agreed that Zionism is racism, saying it is "simply stating historical fact". After the vote Polanski said he will not accept anyone being excluded from the party because of their background or religious affiliation and said that "antisemitism and criticism of the Israeli state are, and must always be, completely distinct".

After the resignation of Keir Starmer from the House of Commons, Polanski stood as a candidate in the resulting Holborn and St Pancras by-election. He received the support of Andrew Feinstein, who had finished second there as an independent candidate in the 2024 general election, when the Greens had come third. Polanski finished second with 32.8% of the vote, to Labour candidate Sagal Abdi-Wali who won with 45.2%.

Due to the "Zionism is racism" motion, Burnham ruled out cooperation between his Labour Party and the Greens. Labour head office issued an ultimatum that power-sharing agreements between Labour and the Greens in local councils would be ended unless the local Green councillors disowned the motion. In November 2026, Labour announced that it would cease cooperation with the Greens in 11 out of the 18 coalition or power-sharing deals it had made with them. In six councils and the West of England mayoralty, cooperation would continue after Labour said the local Greens had condemned the motion. Polanski said Labour wanted to "interrupt your local services and impose genocide support from its local councils".

== Ideology and policy ==
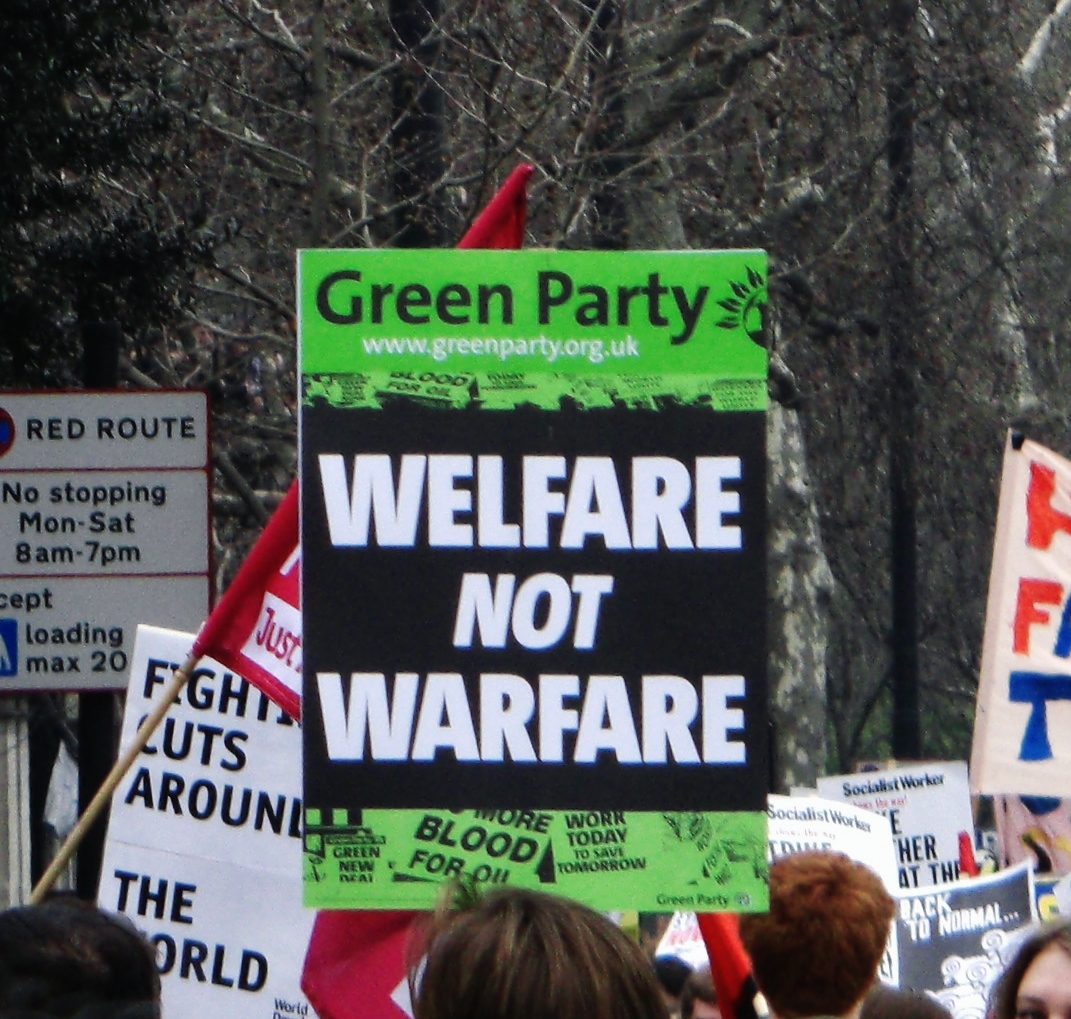
"Welfare not Warfare" sign, indicating the Green Party's policy towards social justice and non-violence

The Green Party is a green and left-wing party, combining environmentalism with left-wing economic policies, including well-funded and locally controlled public services. It advocates a steady-state economy with the regulation of capitalism, and supports proportional representation. It takes a progressive approach to social policies such as civil liberties, LGBTQ rights, drug policy reform and opposition to austerity. The Green Party highlights issues such as the cost-of-living, the climate crisis, inequality and affordability, seeking to tackle them via measures including, but not limited to, lowering bills, rent controls, bringing water companies into public ownership and free bus travel for under-22s, as well as extending measures to tax fossil fuel companies. The party advocates for the public ownership of energy and transport to bring down bills. The party supports a universal basic income, a living wage and participatory democracy. The party has an eco-socialist wing, sometimes called "Red Greens".

Sociologist Chris Rootes stated in 1995 that the Green Party took "the left-libertarian" vote, and James Dennison characterised it in 2016 as reflecting "libertarian-universalistic values". Neil Carter wrote in 2008 that following the demise of Green 2000, the party embraced a "broader left-libertarian agenda", with fellow political scientist Lynn Bennie stating in 2016 that it positioned itself as "left, libertarian and green", documenting its move "from [an] ecological party to a distinctly left libertarian position".

The party also wishes to limit the power of big business, which, it argues, upholds the unsustainable trend of globalisation, and is detrimental to local trade and economies. The Green Party publishes a party platform: a full set of its policies, as approved by successive party conferences, collectively entitled Policies for a Sustainable Society (originally The Manifesto for a Sustainable Society before February 2010).

=== Manifestos ===
The party publishes a manifesto for each of its election campaigns. Separate from this, the Greens have a set of Core Values, a Philosophical Basis and a series of Long-term Goals. For the 2015 general election, the party's manifesto outlined many new policies, including a Robin Hood tax on banks, renationalisation of the railways, reversing privatisation in the NHS, abolishing the bedroom tax and raising the minimum wage.

For the 2019 general election, the party's manifesto had four key sections: "remain and transform", which advocated for the UK to reverse its decision to leave the EU and increase cross-border co-operation with the EU; "grow democracy", which aimed to overhaul the UK's current voting system and rebalance government power by lowering the voting age from 18 to 16 and redefining the jurisdiction of local governments; the "green quality of life guarantee", which addressed social issues such as housing, the NHS, education, countryside conservation, discrimination, crime, drug reform, animal rights, and the implementation of a universal basic income; and the "new deal for tax and spend", which outlined the party's economic policies such as simplifying income tax, increasing corporation tax to make big businesses pay their fair share, supporting small businesses, and ending wasteful spending.

For the 2024 general election, the party's manifesto followed the slogan "Real hope. Real change". Their manifesto focused on providing a "secure future", solving the climate crisis, major investment into the NHS, raising tax on those earning more than £50,270 a year, nationalising Britain's railways, water companies and largest energy companies, expanding renewable power, campaigning for councils to be given the right to set rent controls and ban no-fault evictions.

=== Economic policy ===
The Green Party believes in "an economy that works for all". This includes steps to eliminate poverty with social policies such as increasing the minimum wage in line with the living wage. In October 2021, the party stated its support for a £15 an hour minimum wage. The party supports moving towards a four-day work week; which it is claimed would boost productivity and growth, with Mondays and Fridays being the least productive days in the week.

In November 2019, the Greens pledged to introduce a universal basic income by 2025, which would have given every adult in the United Kingdom (unemployed or not) at least £89 a week (with additional payments to those facing barriers to work, including disabled people and single parents). This aimed to tackle poverty, give people financial security, give people more freedom of choice to cut their working hours, start a green new business, take part in the community, or improve their own well-being. The policy also aimed to tackle the rising levels of automation that threatens to put millions out of work and fundamentally change British industry.

The Green Party wanted to raise corporation tax from 19% to a higher level; this is designed to generate more government revenue and ensure large corporations do not become too powerful. The party wants to end subsidies for fossil fuels and replace them with subsidies for renewable energy sources such as wind, solar power and tidal power. Investment in green energy could potentially create more jobs and boost the economy. The environmental economic policy also includes a Green deal that the Green Party say will generate new jobs and reduce Britain's energy costs. The Green Party wants to increase Britain's development and its position on the Human Development Index and free time index. They believe that uncontrolled economic growth has contributed to pollution and global warming and that more steps should be taken to ensure that growth is sustainable and keeps environmental damage to a minimum.

The party also supports the implementation of a nationwide retrofit insulation programme (for both homeowners and renters). This would be to reduce energy consumption, provide warm homes and lower people's energy bills. The party supports bringing energy and water companies, public transport including buses and railways, as well as Royal Mail into public ownership. They have also called for social care to be free at the point of use.

In the party's 2024 manifesto it proposed an annual wealth tax of 1% on assets above £10 million and 2% on assets above £1 billion.

=== Environmental policy ===
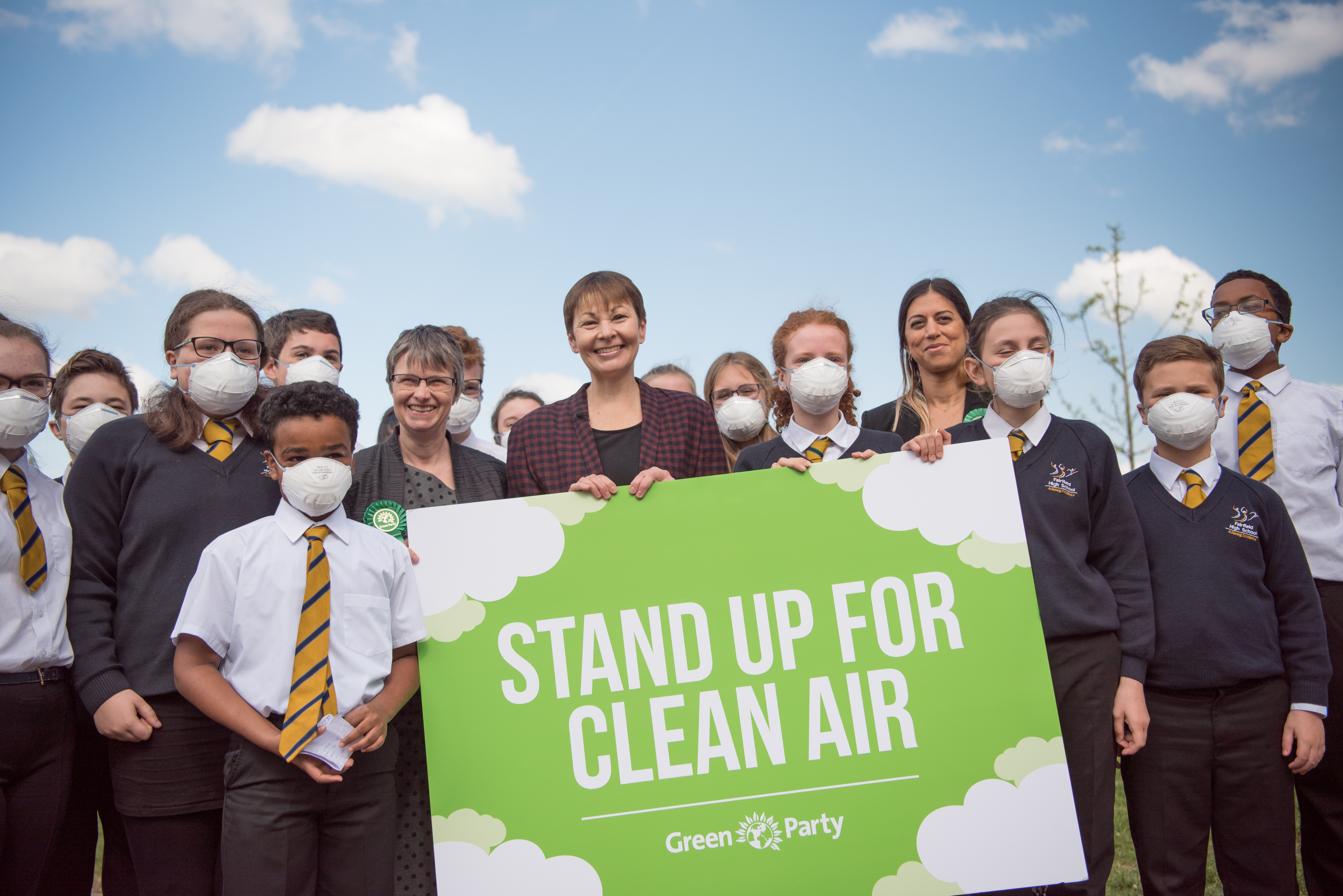
Caroline Lucas campaigning on air quality in 2017

The Green Party supports bringing water companies into public ownership to lower water bills and so that the money that would go to shareholders is instead spent on mending leaks, rebuilding infrastructure and maintaining clean water. The party also wants to set new air quality standards, increase the number of forests and woodlands in England and Wales and extend people's access to green space.

The party states that it would end industry tax breaks and subsidies for fossil fuel–based power generation. Instead it would invest in renewable energy sources, including wind power, solar power and hydropower, as well as new and emerging renewable technologies, such as tidal power and wave power. The party also supports the use of marine energy and geothermal energy. This would coincide with an aim to cut energy use through methods such as home insulation. The party aims for the UK to become carbon neutral. The Green Party Manifesto for the 2019 UK general election stated:

The UK should base its future emissions budgets on the principles of science and equity and the aim of keeping global warming below 1.5 C. These principles entail the UK reducing its own emissions to net-zero by 2030 and seeking to reduce the emissions embedded in its imports to zero as soon as possible. The urgency of these objectives requires the UK to make overcoming the technological, political and social obstacles a national priority.

The Green Party wants to set up an environmental protection committee to ensure the protection of habitats and to enhance biodiversity. The party also wants to ban trophy hunting and trail hunting. Furthermore, the party wants to "extend people’s access to green space and waterways close to where they live with a new English Right to Roam Act."

=== Foreign policy and defence ===
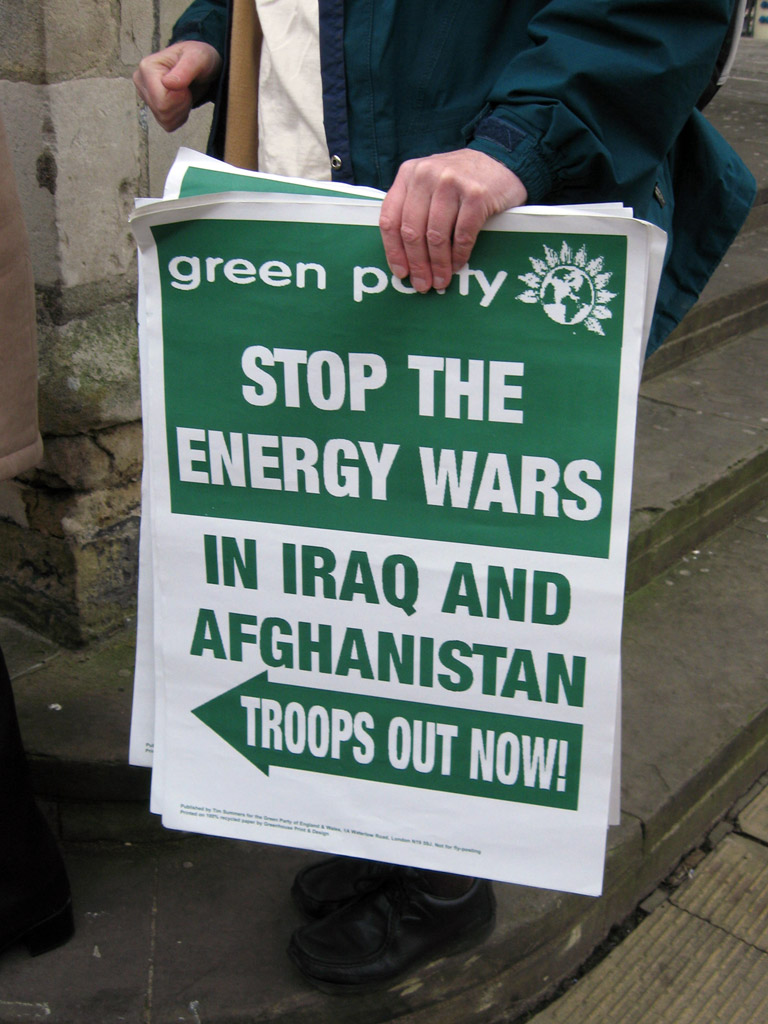
Green Party poster from 2009 calling for the withdrawal of troops from Iraq and Afghanistan

Since at least 1992, the party has emphasised unilateral nuclear disarmament and called for rejection of the UK's Trident nuclear missile programme. To campaign for the latter, in 2015 it teamed up with the organisation, Campaign for Nuclear Disarmament (CND), and the political parties, Plaid Cymru, and the Scottish National Party (SNP). Former Leader Natalie Bennett has advocated replacing the British Army with a "home defence force", according to The Telegraph.

As of 2014, Green Party policy formerly stated that "in the long term, it would take the UK out of NATO". In 2014, Natalie Bennett led an anti-NATO march in Newport, Wales. In 2022, the party formally supported withdrawal from NATO, but not before the end of the Russo-Ukrainian War. This changed in March 2023, when the party abandoned its opposition to NATO; nevertheless, the party said it supports "crucial reforms to the way NATO operates" such as guaranteeing a "no first use" policy on nuclear weapons, that NATO commits to upholding human rights, and that the organisation acts "solely in defence of member states".

The party opposed the UK's involvement in the War in Afghanistan, the invasion of Iraq, military intervention in Libya and opposes British involvement in the Saudi Arabian–led intervention in Yemen. The party campaigns for the rights of indigenous people around the world and argues for greater autonomy for these individuals. Furthermore, they support the granting of compensation and justice for historical wrongs, and that the re-appropriation of lands and resources should be granted to certain nations and peoples. The party also believes that the cancelling of international debt should take place immediately and any financial assistance should be in the form of grants and not loans, limiting debt service payments to 10% of export earnings per year.

The Green Party advocate for a less "bully boy culture" from the Western world and more self-sustainability in terms of food and energy policy on a global level, with aid only being given to countries as a last resort to prevent them from being indebted to their donors. Amid the toughening rhetoric surrounding immigration at the 2015 general election, the Greens issued mugs emblazoned with the slogan "Standing Up For Immigrants". They said they offered a "genuine alternative" to the views of the mainstream parties by promoting the removal of restrictions on the number of foreign students, abolishing rules on family migration, and promoting further rights for asylum seekers. The party states that in government it would "implement a fair and humane system of managed immigration".

=== Drug policy ===
The Green Party has an official drugs group for drugs policy and research. The party wants to end the prohibition of drugs and create a system of legal regulation to minimise the harm associated with drug use as well as the harm associated with its production and supply. The party's view is that people have always used drugs and there will always be people that will use them, and therefore focus should be on minimising the harm associated with drug use and tackling the causes of why people take drugs (e.g. poverty, isolation, mental illness, physical illness, and psychological trauma). This sits alongside the party's belief that adults should be free to make informed decisions about their own drug consumption, while this freedom is also balanced with the government's responsibility to protect individuals and society from harm. The party considers the drugs issue to be a health issue, rather than a criminal one.

The Green Party's 2024 election manifesto states its support for, "A National Commission to agree an evidenced based approach to reform of the UK's counterproductive drug laws. This will allow the UK to move towards a legally regulated market that stops criminal supply and profiteering, and that reduces harm including by preventing children accessing drugs." It goes on to state that, "Neither prohibition nor the policing of low-level drug offences, especially cannabis possession, have reduced use and consequently have had no impact on the size of the criminal market or the profits made by organised crime." The party favours the decriminalisation of the personal possession of drugs, support for diverting people to relevant services such as addiction, housing, employment and health support instead of the criminal justice system and supports harm reduction. The party states this would "free up hundreds of thousands of hours of police time, which could instead be invested in tackling other priorities which benefit wider society."

The party also supports opening overdose prevention centres in towns and cities to prevent fatal overdoses, the transmission of HIV, hepatitis C and other illnesses, as well as offering a place for drug users to access health and treatment services. The party supports devolving the decision-making on whether to open these sites to police, health services and local authorities. Ian Barnett from the Green Party says that: "The Policy of 'War on Drugs' has clearly failed. We need a different approach to the control and misuse of drugs." The party does aim to minimise drug use due to the negative effects on the individual and society at large.

=== Sexual orientation and gender identity ===
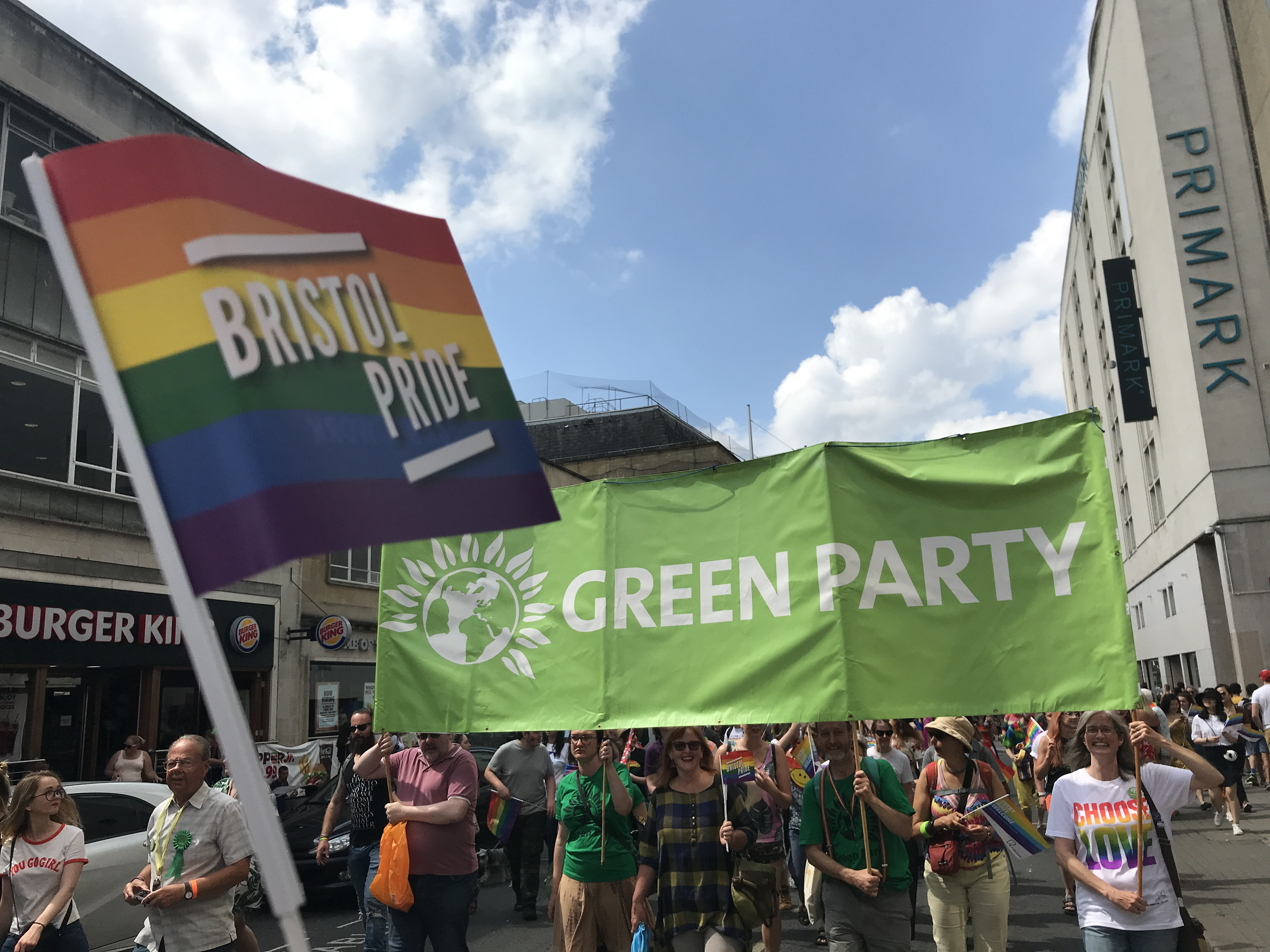
A Green Party banner at Bristol Pride in 2018

The stated aim of the sexual orientation and gender identity group within the party, known as LGBTIQA+ Greens, is to raise awareness on LGBTIQA+ rights and issues affecting the broader LGBTIQA+ community, as well as broader Green politics. The LGBTIQA+ Greens are a special interest group of the party, colloquially known as a Liberation Group. As of January 2025, the co-chairs of the group are Matt Rogan and Kat Bristow.

The 2015 and 2017 general election manifestos contained policies on all teachers to be trained on LGBTIQA+ issues (such as "providing mandatory HIV, sex, and relationships education – age appropriate and LGBTIQA+-inclusive – in all schools from primary level onwards"), on reforming the system of pensions, on ending the "spousal veto" (a provision of the Gender Recognition Act that requires applications for a Gender Recognition Certificate to include written consent from an applicant's spouse) and on "mak[ing] equal marriage truly equal" by amending pension inheritance rights. Bennett has also voiced support for polyamorous relationships.

The Green Party supports same-sex marriage and, on Brighton and Hove City Council, expelled Christina Summers in 2012 due to opposition to same-sex marriage legislation on religious grounds. Some issues of trans rights have caused divisions in the Green Party, such as when Siân Berry cited opposition to her support for trans rights as a reason for stepping down as co-leader. In the subsequent leadership election, candidate Shahrar Ali's comments on trans rights led to the Young Greens to call for his expulsion. After being removed as Speaker for the party, Ali successfully sued the Green Party for unlawful discrimination against someone with views on gender that are protected under the Equality Act 2010. In February 2024, the Mayor's and City County Court ruled that the Greens had breached procedural fairness and awarded him £9,100, but upheld that political parties may dismiss spokespersons for views not in line with their party's values.

At the 2021 Conference, the Green Party voted in favour of gender self-identification and voted down a motion that women were discriminated against "solely upon their biological sex", which opponents claimed excluded trans women. The Scottish Greens suspended their cooperation with the Green Party of England and Wales in October 2022 due to "transphobic rhetoric and conduct" and "lethargic, ineffective, and inconsistent" disciplinary action against "an unelected legislator [who had] insulted [the Scottish Greens] and sought to damage [the Scottish party's] reputation regarding LGBT+ rights, women's rights, and child protection issues". In response, the English and Welsh party replied that "the Green Party of England and Wales is clear that trans rights are human rights and we are proud of our strong policies on trans inclusion".

=== Transport ===
The Green Party has called for "A People's Transport System" to help deal with the issues not just to the planet but to local communities as well. The Green Party has an official transport working group, aimed at helping to draw up policies to be voted on at the conference. The party also aims to prioritise accessibility to transport and create equal access irrespective of age, wealth or disability. The party also wants to reduce the total distance people travel and travel journey lengths by encouraging the development and retention of local facilities. It also seeks to reduce the environmental impacts of transport, partly through encouraging transport that makes use of sustainable and replaceable resources. The party would also implement a green transport hierarchy of transport that would need to be followed by all levels of government:

Similar green transport hierarchy (Green Party Canada, Bradshaw, 1992)

1. Walking and disabled access.
2. Cycling.
3. Public transport (trains, light rail/trams, buses and ferries) and rail and water-borne freight.
4. Light goods vehicles, taxis and low powered motorcycles.
5. Private motorised transport (cars & high powered motorcycles).
6. Heavy goods vehicles.
7. Aeroplanes.

One of the flagship and long-standing policies in this field is returning the railways to public ownership along with renationalising other forms of transport. In September 2024, party members voted to reverse its historical opposition to High Speed 2, passing a motion that called for the rail project to be funded and built in full beyond Birmingham, including the Eastern leg to Leeds and an underground station at Manchester Piccadilly. The party has called for free bus passes for under-22s in England, matching an existing scheme in Scotland.

=== Tuition fees ===
The party supports scrapping university and further education fees. It supports all courses in further education being provided free at the point of use. According to the Green Party:

Under a green government all currently outstanding debts – yet to be paid – held by an individual, for undergraduate tuition fees and maintenance loans, and any resulting interest would be written off. Specifically, those issued by the Student Loans Company (SLC) and currently held by the UK government.

=== Governance ===
==== Global governance ====
The party campaigns for greater accountability in global governance, with the United Nations made up of elected representatives and more regional representation, as opposed to the current nation-based setup. They want democratic control of the global economy with the World Trade Organization, International Monetary Fund and World Bank reformed, democratised or even replaced. The party also wishes to prioritise social and environmental sustainability as a global policy.

==== National governance ====
The party advocates ending the first-past-the-post voting system for UK parliamentary elections and replacing it with a form of proportional representation. The party has also advocated for the inclusion of a Re-open Nominations (RON) option on UK ballot papers. The Green Party states that they believe there is "no place in government for the hereditary principle". In their long-term goals, they advocate that "The monarchy shall cease to be an office of government. The legislative, executive and judicial roles of the monarch shall cease." The party supports the separation of church and state. It advocates that the Church of England be disestablished from the British state and become self-governing. The party supported Scottish independence in the 2014 Scottish independence referendum.

In February 2021, the Green Party announced that it supported a referendum on Welsh independence and would campaign in favour of independence if a referendum were to be held, following a 2020 conference vote. For the 2024 election, the Welsh branch backed Welsh independence in their manifesto. The party's general policy is to support the self-determination of Scotland, Wales and Northern Ireland, should they wish to secede from the United Kingdom. Unlike the UK's other prominent political parties, the Green Party regularly fields candidates against the Speaker of the House of Commons in general elections and they typically receive the largest vote share after the Speaker.

==== European Union ====
In their manifesto for the 1987 United Kingdom general election the Green Party opposed the European Economic Community due to their concerns about large scale corporate and governmental power, as well as objecting to the Common Agricultural Policy. The Green Party remained Eurosceptic for the 1989 European Parliament election and during the 1990s. Their first two Members of the European Parliament were elected in 1999 due to the adoption of proportional representation, and during the 21st century EU policies developed to include more environmental protection and sustainability. Green Party policy changed to advocating EU reform, arguing in particular for increased democracy and reduced corporate lobbying.

The party supported the 2016 United Kingdom European Union membership referendum, calling it "a vital opportunity to create a more democratic and accountable Europe, with a clearer purpose for the future". The party has criticised the Common Fisheries Policy and the "excessive influence" of the European Commission in comparison to the European Council and European Parliament, describing it as "undemocratic and unaccountable". The party favoured a "three yeses" approach to Europe: "yes to a referendum, yes to major EU reform and yes to staying in a reformed Europe". In 2013, the then party leader Natalie Bennett added:

'Yes to the EU' does not mean we are content with the union continuing to operate as it has in the past. There is a huge democratic deficit in its functioning, a serious bias towards the interests of neoliberalism and 'the market', and central institutions have been overbuilt. But to achieve those reforms we need to work with fellow EU members, not try to dictate high handedly to them, as David Cameron has done.

The party came out in favour of the UK remaining in the EU in February 2016, prior to the EU referendum in June 2016. Reasons the party cited for supporting remaining in the EU included the protection of workers rights and environmental standards.

== Organisation and structure ==
The party has two governing bodies: the Green Party Executive (GPEx) and the Green Party Council.

=== Green Party Executive (GPEx) ===
Day-to-day management of party affairs, as well as party finances and employment of staff are handled by the GPEx.

=== Green Party Council (GPC) ===
The Green Party Regional Council (GPRC) was the main policy body between Green Party Conferences, as well as handling broader political strategy, and responsibility as the ultimate disciplinary body of the party, consisting of two members elected from each region (20 total).

In October 2025, the party's conference voted for constitutional reform that abolishes the GPRC and created a new Green Party Council (GPC). It will consist of 36 ordinary members elected at-large for three-year terms, with 12 elected in staggered elections each year, while allowing for caps on representation from each party region as well as the creation of two additional seats if fewer than 4 people from the global majority are elected as ordinary members to the Council. Members of this new body will be elected for the first time in 2026, with previous members of the GPRC continuing until then.

=== Member groups ===
There are a number of member groups affiliated to the Green Party. The youth wing of the Green Party, the Young Greens of England and Wales, has developed independently from around 2002; it is for all Green Party members aged up to 30 years old or in full or part-time education. There is no lower age limit. The Young Greens have their own constitution, national committee, campaigns and meetings, and have become an active presence at Green Party Conferences and election campaigns. There are now many Young Greens groups on UK university, college and higher-education institution campuses. Many Green Party councillors are Young Greens, as are some members of GPEx and other internal party organs. Special interest groups include:

- Association of Green Councillors
- Disabled Greens
- Feminist Greens
- Global Majority Greens
- Green Humanists
- Green Left
- Green Party Trade Union Group
- Green Party Women
- Green Seniors
- Greens for Animal Protection
- Jewish Greens
- LGBTIQA+ Greens
- Muslim Greens
- Vegan Greens
- Young Greens

Unofficial organisations affiliated with the party include:

- Greens Organise
- Greens for Palestine
- Greens For Nuclear

== Membership and finances ==
Number of registered members

The Green Party relies more on membership income than other parties. In 2014, membership income made up 23% of Green Party income (compared to just 2% of Conservative Party and 9% of Liberal Democrat incomes). As Catherine Rowett explained, "Money pays for leaflets, campaigns, staff time. Big parties have huge donors who want a reward in the form of corrupt access to government. We run a clean campaign with money from our members. Little bits of money, whatever you can afford."

Membership increased rapidly in 2014, more than doubling in that year. On 15 January 2015, the Green Party said that the combined membership of the UK Green Parties (Green Party of England and Wales, Scottish Greens, and Green Party Northern Ireland) had risen to 43,829 members, surpassing UKIP's membership of 41,966, and making it the third-largest UK-wide political party in the UK in terms of membership. On 14 January 2015, The Guardian reported that membership of the combined UK Green Parties was closing on those of UKIP and the Liberal Democrats, but noted that it lagged behind that of the Scottish National Party (SNP), which at the time had 92,187 members but is not a UK-wide party. Membership of the party peaked at more than 67,000 members in the summer of 2015 after the general election, but later declined subsequent to Jeremy Corbyn becoming leader of the Labour Party.

Following the election of Zack Polanski as party leader, membership of the party increased significantly, overtaking membership figures for both the Liberal Democrats and the Conservative Party. On 27 October, the party's membership was over 150,000, having doubled since Polanski became leader. On 9 December, the party had reached 180,000 members. On 1 March 2026, the party had reached 200,000 members, a tripling in membership since Polanski became leader in September 2025. In May 2026, the party had 230,000 members. In October 2026, Ellie Chowns stated the party had 240,000 members. Later that month, leaked internal figures suggested that the party had fallen to 213,000 members. For the year ending 31 December 2024, Green Party income was £5,217,767 and expenditure was £4,985,310.

=== Support base ===
"Green voters have tended to be younger and better educated than the electorate at large, and they are known to be more likely than most voters to work in the public sector. In terms of values, Green voters have been found to be more often than not on the left of the political spectrum, and they have been more likely than the average voter to hold post-materialist values, including support for environmental protection."

— Sarah Birch, 2009

According to political scientist Sarah Birch, the Green Party draws support from "a wide spectrum of the population". In 1995, sociologist Chris Rootes stated that the Green Party "appeals disproportionately to younger, highly educated professional people"; he said that this support base was "not predominantly urban". In 2009, Birch noted that the Greens' strongest areas of support were Labour-held seats in university towns or urban areas with relatively large student populations. She noted that there were also strong correlations between areas of high Green support and high percentages of people who define themselves as having no religion. Birch noted that sociological polling found a "strong relationship" between individuals having voted for the Liberal Democrats in the past and holding favourable views of the Green Party, noting that the two groups were competing for "similar sorts of voters".

The Green party has seen some success in more rural areas, evident in Adrian Ramsay's election victory in 2024 in the Waveney Valley constituency, which Electoral Calculus described as having right-wing social and economic attitudes and which is primarily rural. The outlet, Bright Green, stated in June 2024 that the Green Party appealed to rural voters due to the failure of Conservative administrations to ensure economic prosperity and a view that the Labour Party primarily focuses on urban voters.

A February 2024 poll showed that 14% of Muslim voters voted for the Green Party, and 38% of them believed Labour had "become more unfavourable". In September 2024, Sky News reported that the Green Party's anti-Gaza war stance had attracted a significant amount of Muslim voters who had previously voted for the Labour Party. When Green Party politician Mothin Ali was elected as a Leeds City Council member, The Daily Telegraph noted that he called his victory a "win for the people of Gaza" and chanted takbir. In October 2025, unnamed Green Party members told Hyphen that the party has seen an increase in Muslim voters since Mothin Ali was elected to be its deputy leader. Faaiz Hasan, a member of "Muslim Greens" group within the party, said the party is becoming popular in communities with high amount of Muslims, like Barking and Dagenham.

== Election results ==
The party has five members of Parliament, two members of the House of Lords, three members of the London Assembly, and more than 1,300 councillors who have been elected at the local level.

=== House of Commons ===
The first MP elected as a representative of the Green Party was Cynog Dafis, who was elected on a joint ticket with Plaid Cymru for the seat of Ceredigion and Pembroke North in the 1992 general election. The first MP to represent the Green Party alone was Caroline Lucas, who won the seat of Brighton Pavilion at the 2010 general election, which was then held by the Greens at each subsequent election in 2015, 2017, 2019 and 2024. A further three seats were won in 2024 – Bristol Central, North Herefordshire, and Waveney Valley. As with other small parties, representation at the House of Commons has been hindered by the first-past-the-post voting system, meaning the party is highly under-represented. In 2019, it received 835,589 votes accounting for 2.7% of total votes, but only 0.2%, or one, of the seats.

The party won its first by-election in Gorton and Denton in February 2026, with Hannah Spencer being elected.

Election	Leader(s) (Note: This post was known as Principal Speaker(s) until 2008.)		Votes			Seats		Government
Election	Leader(s)		#	%	±	#	±	Government
1992	Jean Lambert	Richard Lawson	170,047	0.5	▼0.2	0 / 650	Steady	Conservative
1997	Peg Alexander	David Taylor	61,731	0.3	▼0.2	0 / 659	Steady	Labour
2001	Margaret Wright	Mike Woodin	166,477	0.6	▲0.3	0 / 659	Steady	Labour
2005	Caroline Lucas	Keith Taylor	257,758	1.0	▲0.4	0 / 646	Steady	Labour
2010	Caroline Lucas		265,247	0.9	▼0.1	1 / 650	▲1	Conservative–Liberal Democrats
2015	Natalie Bennett		1,111,603	3.8	▲2.9	1 / 650	Steady	Conservative
2017	Caroline Lucas	Jonathan Bartley	512,327	1.6	▼2.2	1 / 650	Steady	Conservative minority with DUP confidence & supply
2019	Siân Berry	Jonathan Bartley	835,589	2.6	▲1.0	1 / 650	Steady	Conservative
2024	Carla Denyer	Adrian Ramsay	1,841,888	6.4	▲3.8	4 / 650	▲3	Labour

=== House of Lords ===
The party's first life peer was Baron Beaumont of Whitley, who defected from the Liberal Democrat group of peers in 1999, spoke frequently in the house and died in 2008. Baroness Jones of Moulsecoomb became the next peer in 2013. Former party leader Baroness Bennett of Manor Castle joined her in 2019. She was appointed on the back of continued strong election results for the party, through Theresa May's resignation honours list.

=== European Parliament ===
The Green Party of England and Wales had representation in the European Parliament from June 1999, the first UK election to the European Parliament with proportional representation. From 1999 to 2010, the two MEPs were Jean Lambert (London) and Caroline Lucas (South East England). In 2010, on election to the House of Commons, Lucas resigned her seat and was succeeded by Keith Taylor. In May 2014, Taylor and Lambert held their seats, and were joined by Molly Scott Cato who was elected in the South West region, increasing the number of Green Party Members of the European Parliament to three for the first time. In May 2019, this number rose to seven: Scott Ainslie (London), Ellie Chowns (West Midlands), Gina Dowding (North West England), Magid Magid (Yorkshire and the Humber), Alexandra Phillips (South East England), Catherine Rowett (East of England), and the re-elected Scott Cato.

Election	Leader(s)		Votes			Seats		Position
Election	Leader(s)		#	%	±	#	±	Position
1994	John Cornford	Jan Clark	471,257	3.0	▼11.9	0 / 87	Steady	▼5th
1999	Mike Woodin	Jean Lambert	568,236	5.3	▲2.3	2 / 87	▲2	5th
2004	Mike Woodin	Caroline Lucas	948,588	5.6	▲0.3	2 / 78	Steady	5th
2009	Caroline Lucas		1,223,303	7.8	▲2.2	2 / 72	Steady	5th
2014	Natalie Bennett		1,136,670	6.9	▼0.9	3 / 73	▲1	▲4th
2019	Jonathan Bartley	Siân Berry	1,881,306	11.8	▲4.9	7 / 73	▲4	4th

=== Local government ===
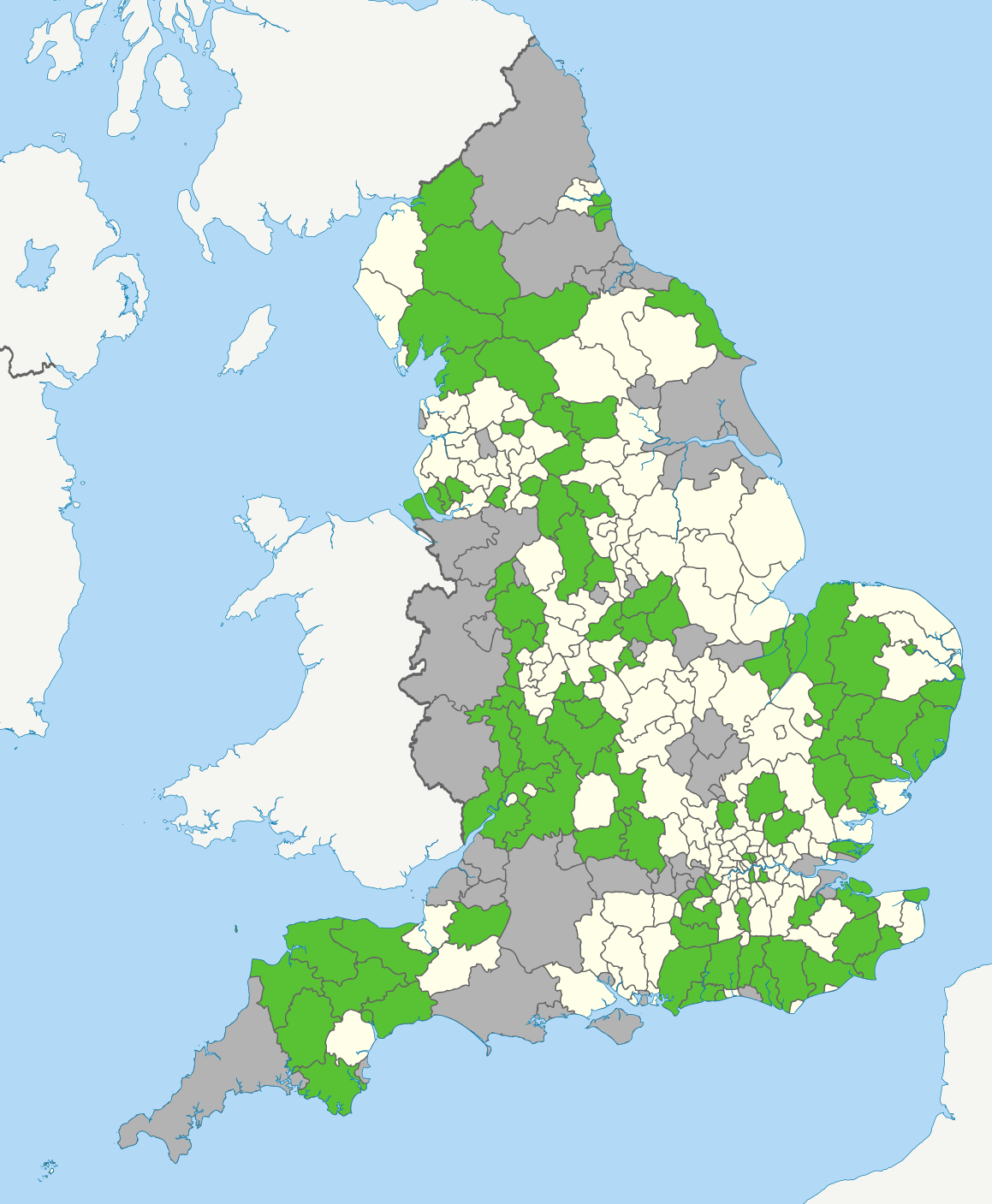
A map showing the representation of the Green Party of England and Wales at the district level of government in England following the 2019 English local elections, excluding unitary authorities (grey)

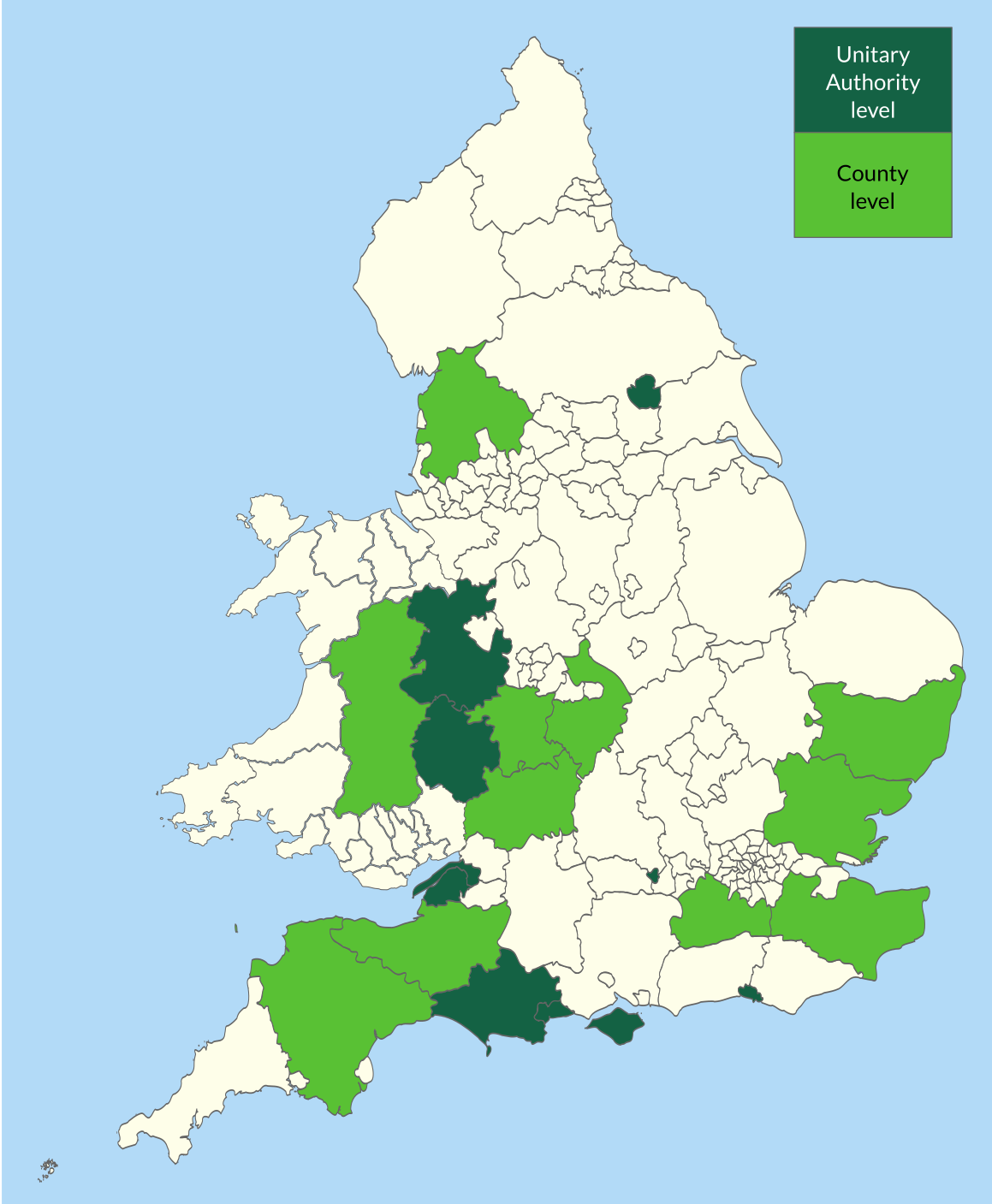
A map showing the representation of the Green Party of England and Wales at the county/unitary authority level of government in England and Wales after the 2019 English local elections

The party has representation at the local government level in England and Wales. The party had its first local mayor, Peter Christie, in 1985 in Bideford. From the early 1990s until 2009, the number of Green local councillors rose from none to more than 100.

In 2011, the party led a council for the first time, when they took minority control of Brighton and Hove City Council following the 2011 Brighton and Hove City Council election. In July 2020, the Green Party again took minority control of Brighton, following the collapse of the Labour Party's minority administration.

In 2021, the Green Party and Plaid Cymru announced the Common Ground Alliance, in which they would field join candidates for the 2022 Cardiff Council election. The Alliance won 17.3% of the vote in third place, but only 2 out of the 79 seats.

The 2023 United Kingdom local elections saw the Greens' winning an overall council majority for the first time on Mid Suffolk District Council. Following the 2024 United Kingdom local elections Greens led coalitions on Babergh, Bristol, East Hertfordshire, East Suffolk, Folkestone & Hythe, Forest of Dean, Hastings, Lancaster, Lewes, Maidstone, Stroud and Warwick councils and were part of coalitions running more than two dozen more.

Since 2017, the party has increased its number of councillors at every election, which after the 2025 local elections had reached an all-time high of 859 seats on 181 different councils.

In the 2026 local elections, the party gained control of five new councils, including its first two directly elected mayors in London, as well as becoming the largest party in several councils with no overall control. For example, Waltham Forest Green Party won 31 of 60 seats, gaining overall control of Waltham Forest Council for the first time and becoming the first Green-controlled council in London.

=== Senedd ===
Since 2026, the party has had members of the Welsh Senedd, gaining its first two seats in the 2026 Senedd election.

== Current and former representatives ==
=== House of Commons ===
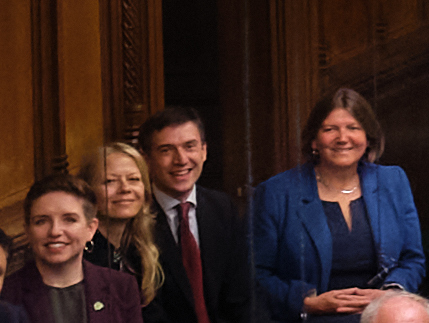
Four of the Green Party MPs, cropped from the 2024 new Member group photograph

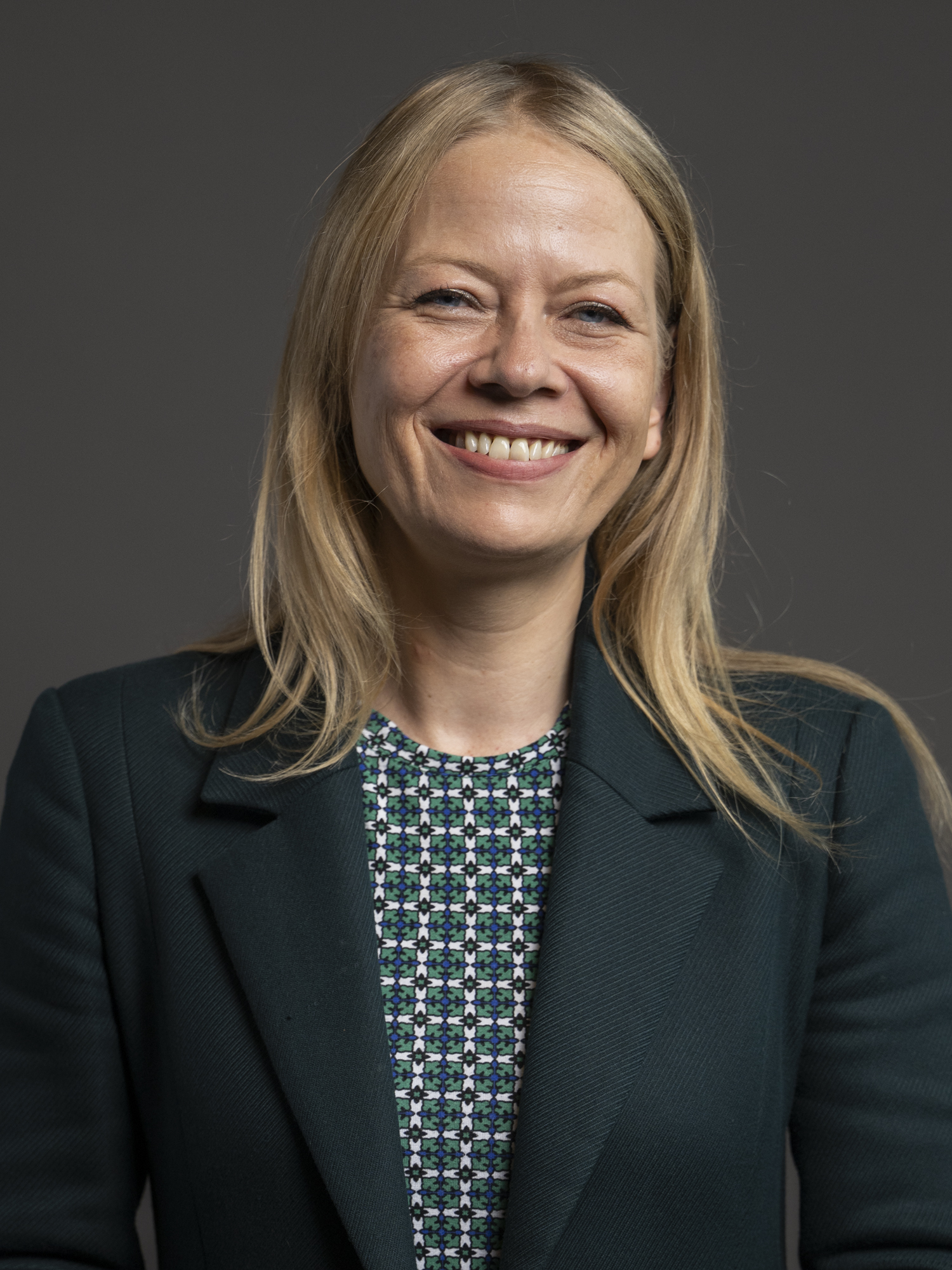
Siân Berry MP (Brighton Pavilion), 2024–present

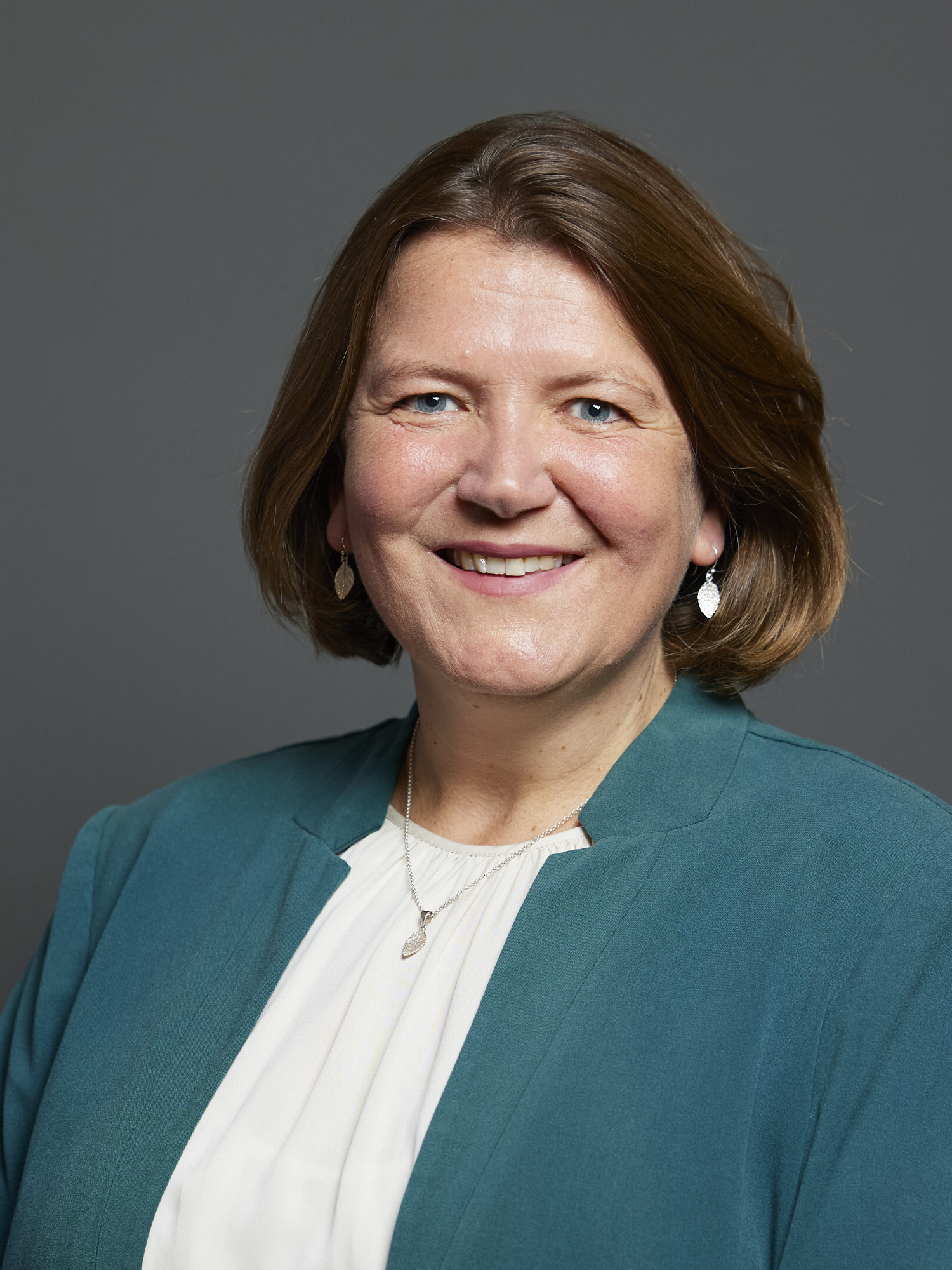
Ellie Chowns MP (North Herefordshire), 2024–present

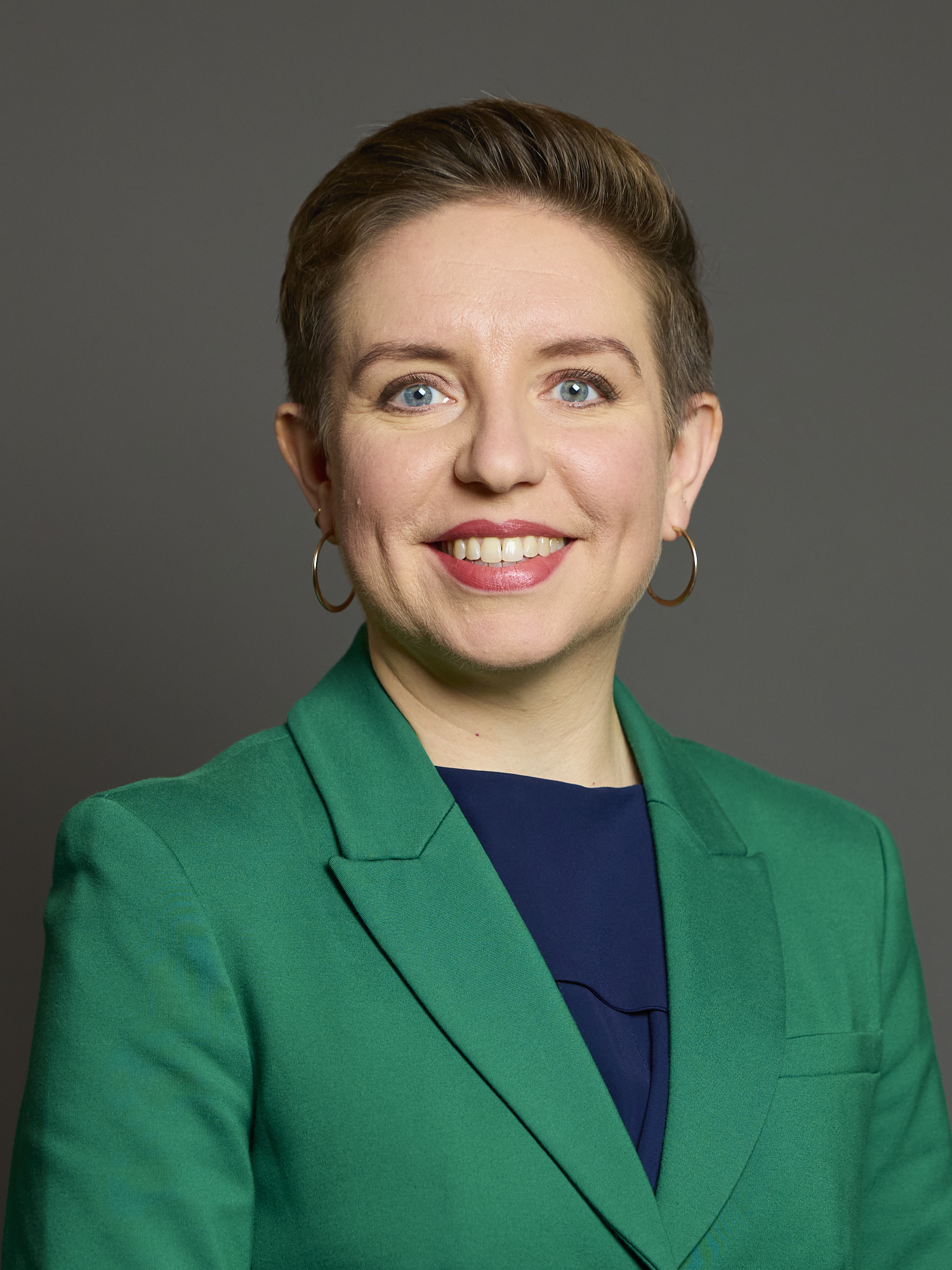
Carla Denyer MP (Bristol Central), 2024–present

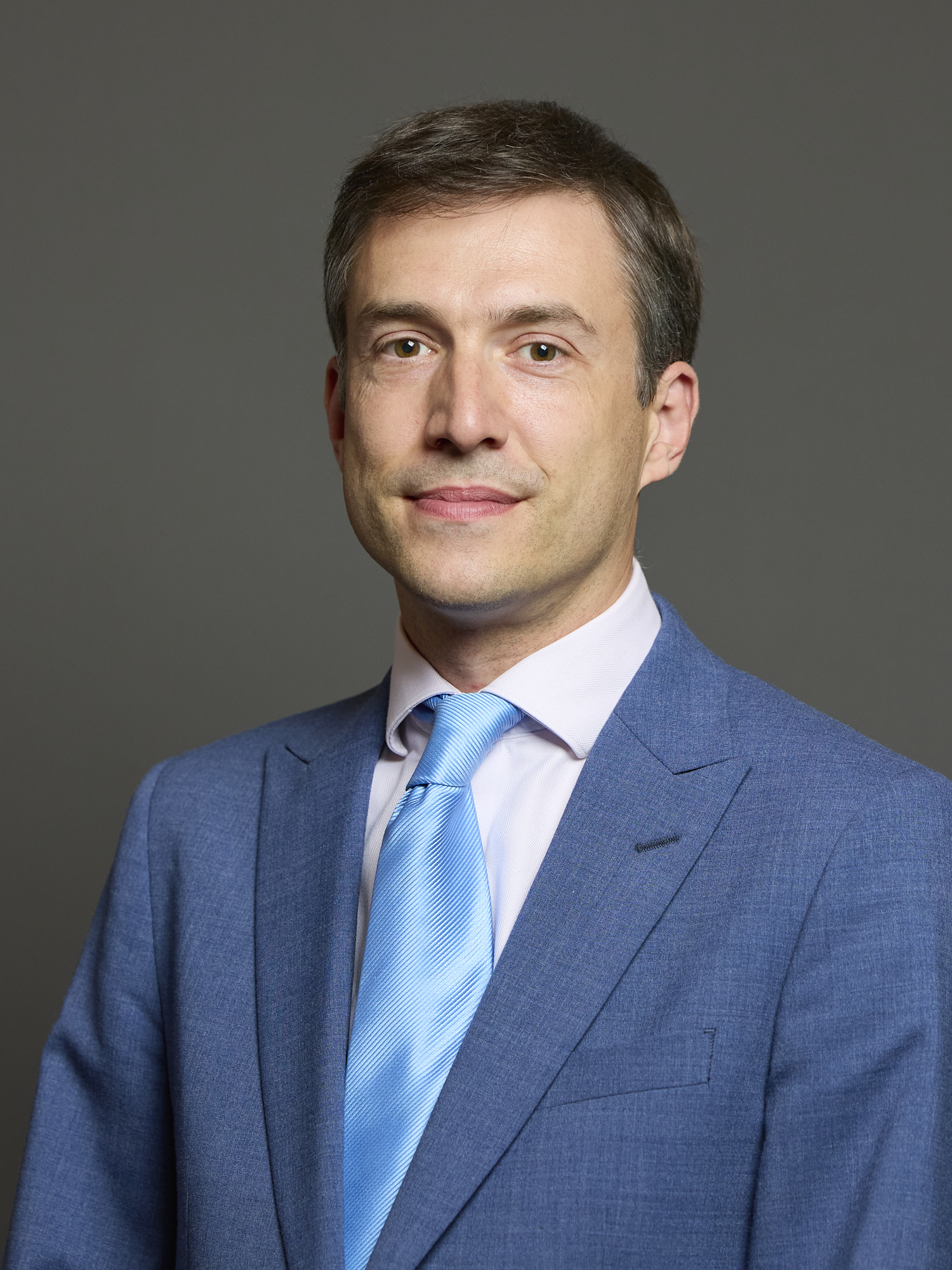
Adrian Ramsay MP (Waveney Valley), 2024–present

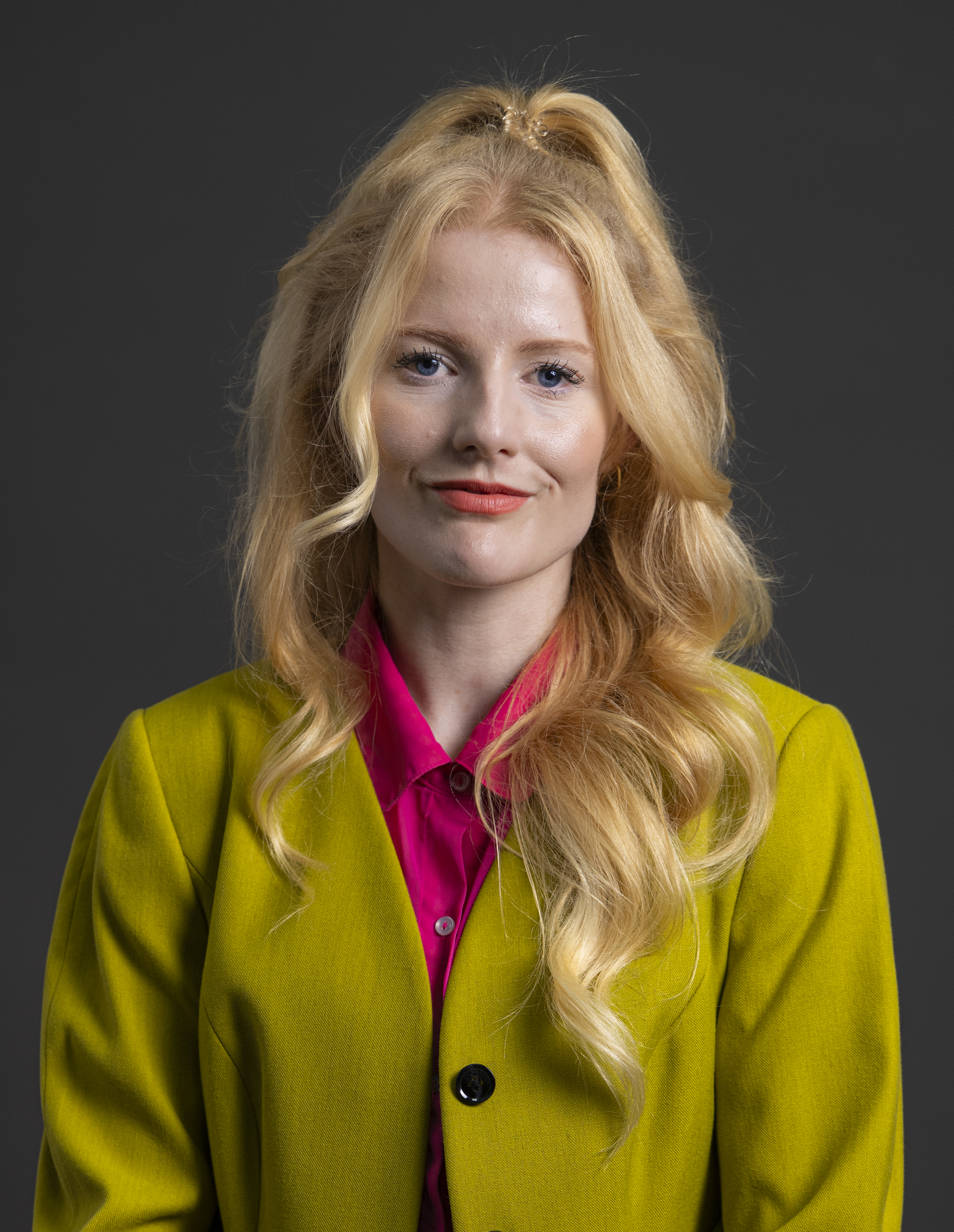
Hannah Spencer MP (Gorton and Denton), 2026–present

=== House of Lords ===
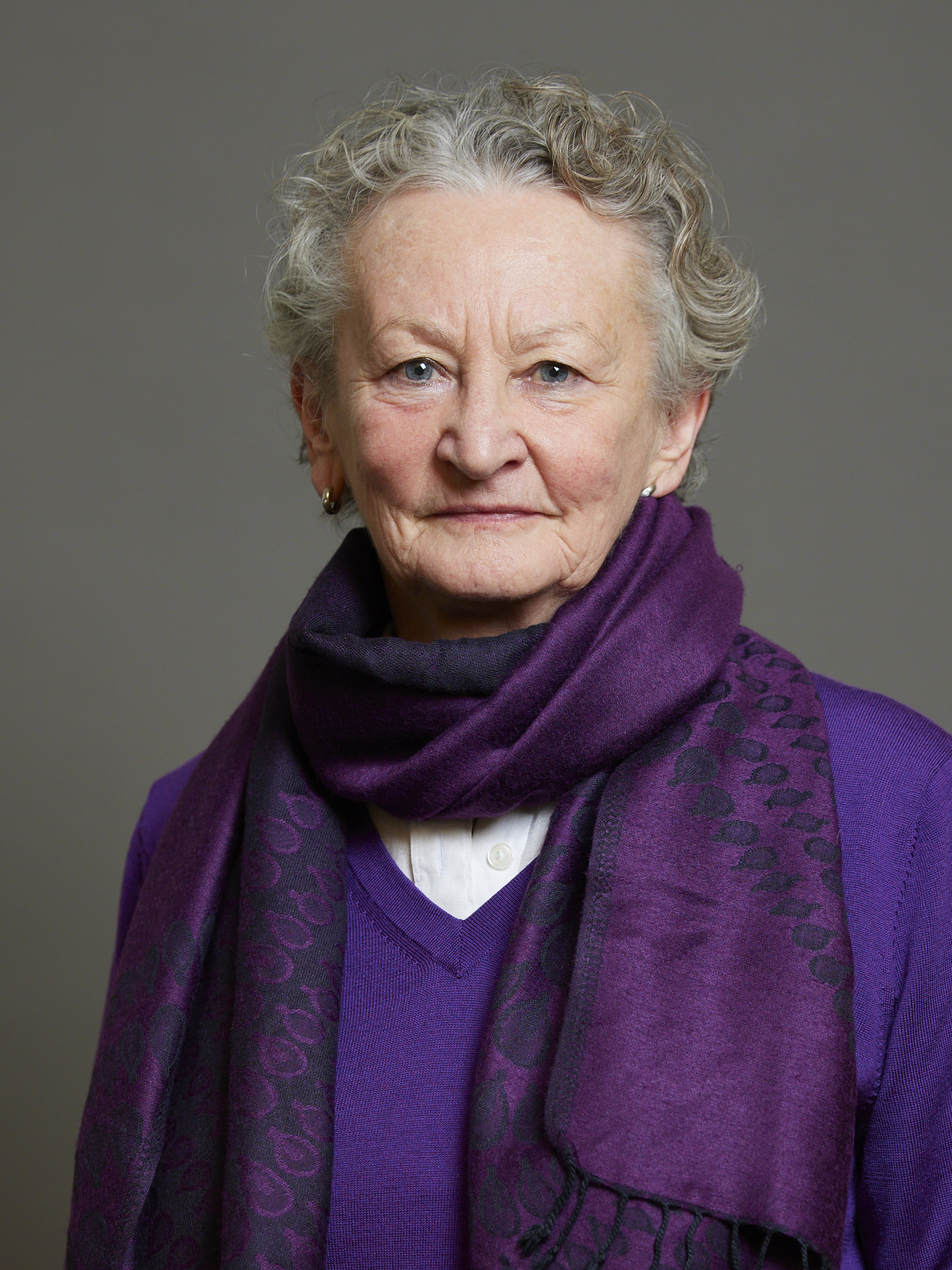
Baroness Jones of Moulsecoomb, 2013–present

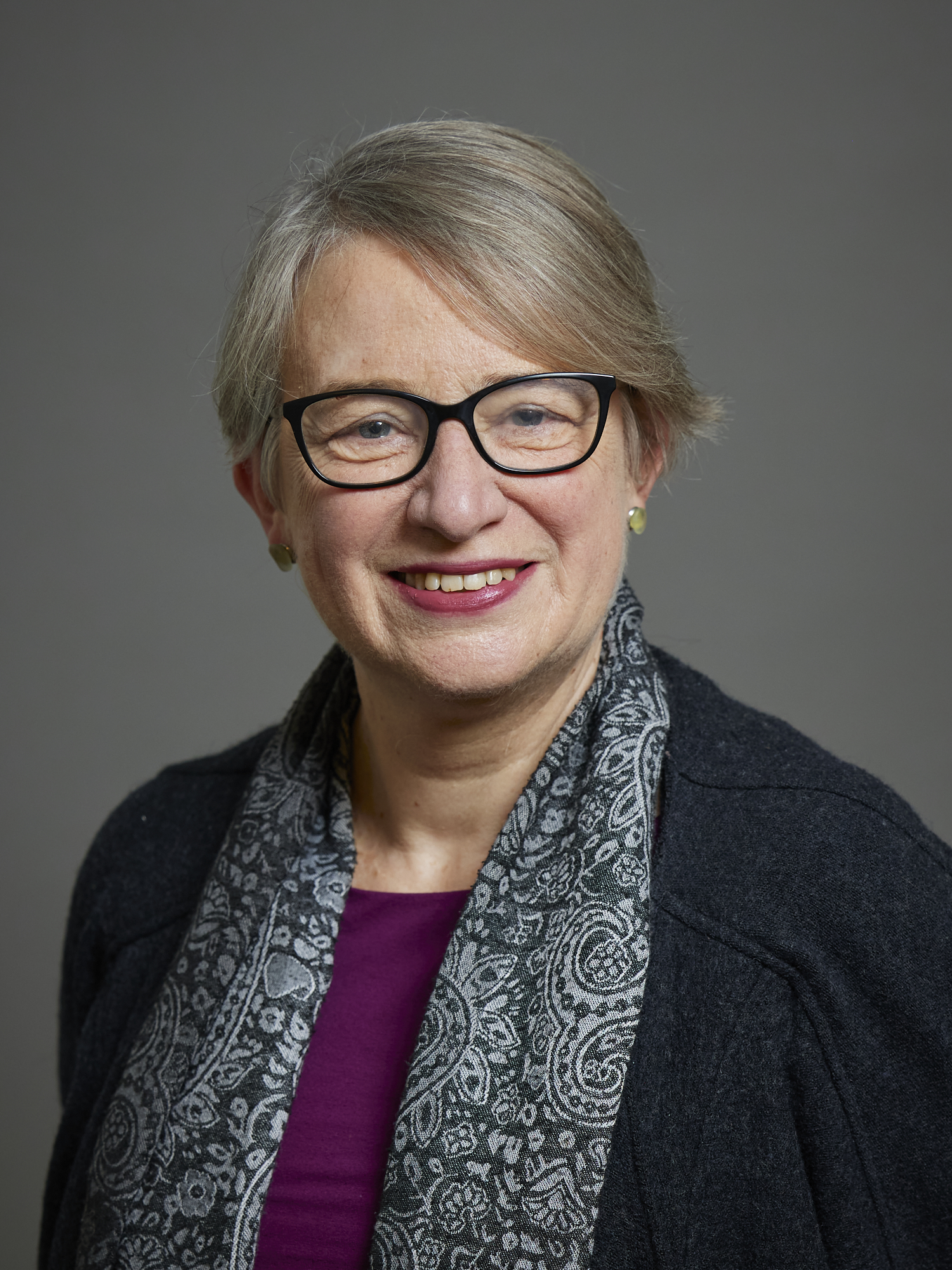
Baroness Bennett of Manor Castle, 2019–present

=== Former ===
==== House of Commons ====
- Cynog Dafis MP (Ceredigion), 1992–2000 (ran on a Joint Ticket with Plaid Cymru and was a member of the Green Party until 1997. Caroline Lucas is usually considered the first Green MP for this reason)
- Caroline Lucas MP (Brighton Pavilion), 2010–2024

==== House of Lords ====
- George MacLeod, Baron MacLeod of Fuinary, 1980s–1991
- Baron Beaumont of Whitley, 1999–2008 (originally a peer for Liberals between 1967 and 1988 and Lib Dems between 1988 and 1999)

== See also ==
- Bright Green
- Libertarianism in the United Kingdom
- List of British republicans
