= Libertarianism in the United Kingdom =

Political ideology

Libertarianism in the United Kingdom can either refer to political movements synonymous with anarchism, left-libertarianism or libertarian socialism, or to a political movement concerned with the pursuit of propertarian right-libertarian ideals in the United Kingdom which emerged and became more prominent in British politics after the 1980s neoliberalism and the economic liberalism of the premiership of Margaret Thatcher, albeit not as prominent as libertarianism in the United States in the 1970s and under the presidency of Republican Ronald Reagan during the 1980s.

UK voters have tended to vote more in line with their position along the traditional 'left-right' division rather than along libertarian-authoritarian lines, and thus libertarians in the United Kingdom have supported parties across the political spectrum. As of 2026, the Conservative Party and Green Party of England and Wales are currently the only two major political parties that have active libertarian factions, which are right-wing and left-wing, respectively.

== Political parties ==
=== Conservative Party ===
Libertarianism, and particularly right-libertarianism, became more prominent in British politics after the promotion of neoliberalism and economic liberalism under the premiership of Margaret Thatcher. Since the 1980s, a number of Conservative MPs have been considered to have libertarian leanings, and libertarian groups have been perceived to exert considerable influence over the Party. There has also been a long-standing right-libertarian faction of the mainstream Conservative Party that espouses Thatcherism.

However, in her first Conservative Party conference speech as leader, Theresa May attacked the "libertarian right" and argued for a more pro-state communitarian conservatism. In recent years, Conservative Party policy has appeared to move further away from libertarianism, and a smaller proportion of their support has come from voters with libertarian attitudes.

=== Green Party of England and Wales ===
Sociologist Chris Rootes stated in 1995 that the Green Party took "the left-libertarian" vote, and James Dennison characterised it in 2016 as reflecting "libertarian-universalistic values". Neil Carter wrote in 2008 that following the demise of Green 2000 the party embraced a "broader left-libertarian agenda", with fellow political scientist Lynn Bennie stating in 2016 that they positioned themselves as "left, libertarian and green" documenting their move "from [an] ecological party to a distinctly left libertarian position".

The party wants an end to big government – which they see as hindering open and transparent democracy – and want to limit the power of big business – which, they argue, upholds the unsustainable trend of globalisation, and is detrimental to local trade and economies. There have been allegations of factionalism and infighting in the Green Party between liberal, socialist, and eco-anarchist factions.

=== UK Independence Party ===
As leader of the Eurosceptic UK Independence Party (UKIP), Nigel Farage sought to broaden the public perception of the UKIP beyond being a party solely seeking to withdraw the United Kingdom from the European Union to one of being a party broadly standing for libertarian values and reductions in government bureaucracy. The party describes itself as a "libertarian, non-racist Eurosceptic party".

==== Criticism ====
UKIP's original activist base was largely "libertarian", supporting an economically liberal approach. Its "economic libertarian" views have been influenced by classical liberalism and Thatcherism, with Thatcher representing a key influence on UKIP's thought. Farage has characterised UKIP as "the true inheritors" of Thatcher, claiming that the party never would have formed had Thatcher remained Prime Minister of the UK throughout the 1990s. Winlow, Hall, and Treadwell suggested that a UKIP government would pursue "hard-core Thatcherism" on economic policy. UKIP presents itself as a "libertarian party", and the political scientists David Deacon and Dominic Wring described it as articulating "a potent brand of libertarian populism". However, commentators writing in The Spectator, The Independent, and the New Statesman have all challenged the description of UKIP as libertarian, highlighting its socially conservative and economically protectionist policies as being contrary to a libertarian ethos.

In 2010, the UKIP's call to ban the burkha in public places was criticised by Shami Chakrabarti as contrary to libertarianism.

=== Other parties ===
The Libertarian Party describes itself as being a "Classically Liberal, Regionalist and Minarchist organisation". The Liberal Party was formed in 1989 from those opposed to the merger between the Liberal Party and the Social Democratic Party; it follows classical liberalism. The Scottish Libertarian Party was formed as a separate party in 2012 and officially registered in 2014. It was statutorily deregistered on 11 November 2022 for failing to meet Electoral Commission requirements

== Prominent libertarians ==
Prominent British libertarians have included:

- Bill Etheridge (born 1970) defected from the UK Independence Party to the Libertarian Party in 2018, becoming Deputy Chair, before defecting to the Brexit Party in 2019
- Sean Gabb (born 1960) director of the Libertarian Alliance from 2006 to 2017
- Peter Thomas Bauer (1915–2002), developmental economist and 2002 winner of the Cato Institute's Milton Friedman Prize
- Alan Duncan (born 1957), Conservative politician
- Andrew Marr (born 1959), journalist and political commentator
- Friedrich Hayek (1899–1992), economist and author
- Herbert Spencer (1820–1903), philosopher
- Chris Tame (1949–2006), co-founder of the Libertarian Alliance
- Douglas Carswell (born 1971), UK Independence Party politician
- David Davis (born 1948), Brexit Secretary and Conservative politician

== See also ==
- Anarchism in the United Kingdom
- Assisted suicide in the United Kingdom
- Censorship in the United Kingdom
- Classical liberalism
- Diggers
- Drug policy of the United Kingdom
- Euthanasia in the United Kingdom
- Levellers
- Libertarianism in the United States
- Radicalism (historical)

== Bibliography ==
- Robinson, Chris (2010). Electoral Systems and Voting in United Kingdom. Politics Study Guides. Edinburgh University Press. ISBN 978-0748627509.
- Woodward, Will (11 April 2007). "UKIP trebles candidates for local elections". The Guardian. London.
- Ruddick, Siân (13 June 2009). "What lies behind UKIP's success?". Socialist Worker. No. 2155. Archived from the original on 13 April 2015.
- Rootes, Chris (1995). "Britain: Greens in a Cold Climate". The Green Challenge: The Development of Green Parties in Europe. Dick Richardson and Chris Rootes. London and New York: Routledge. pp. 66–90.
- Dennison, James; Goodwin, Matthew (2015). "Immigration, Issue Ownership and the Rise of UKIP". Parliamentary Affairs. 68: 168–187. doi:10.1093/pa/gsv034.
- Tournier-Sol, Karine (2015). "Reworking the Eurosceptic and Conservative Traditions into a Populist Narrative: UKIP's Winning Formula?". Journal of Common Market Studies. 53 (1): 140–156. doi:10.1111/jcms.12208. S2CID 142738345.
- Lynch, Philip; Whitaker, Richard (2013). "Rivalry on the Right: The Conservatives, the UK Independence Party (UKIP) and the EU Issue". British Politics. 8 (3): 285–312. doi:10.1057/bp.2012.29. hdl:2381/31946. S2CID 154926119.
- Winlow, Simon; Hall, Steve; Treadwell, James (2017). The Rise of the Right: English Nationalism and the Transformation of Working-Class Politics. Bristol: Policy Press. ISBN 978-1447328483.
- Deacon, David; Wring, Dominic (2016). "The UK Independence Party, Populism and the British News Media: Competition, Collaboration or Containment?". European Journal of Communication (Submitted manuscript). 31 (2): 169–184. doi:10.1177/0267323115612215. S2CID 147206873.
- Ford, Robert; Goodwin, Matthew (2014). Revolt on the Right: Explaining Support for the Radical Right in Britain. London: Routledge. ISBN 978-0415661508.
- Carter, Neil (1 June 2008). "The Green Party: Emerging from the Political Wilderness?" (PDF). British Politics. 3 (2). London: Palgrave Macmillan: 223–240. doi:10.1057/bp.2008.5.
- Bennie, Lynn (28 April 2016). "9 - Greens in the United Kingdom and Ireland: Weak but persistent". In van Haute, Emilie (ed.). Green Parties in Europe (1st ed.). Abingdon: Routledge. pp. 196–216. ISBN 978-1-317-12454-2.
