= Greens Organise =

UK left-wing campaigning organisation

- Abbreviation: GO
- Formation: 7 September 2024 (2 years ago)
- Headquarters: Brighton, England, BN1 3PB
- Region served: England and Wales
- Affiliations: Green Party of England and Wales
- Website: greensorganise.uk

Greens Organise is a British left-wing political organisation formed by members of the Green Party of England and Wales. It was founded in September 2024 by around 150 party members including Zoë Garbett AM, and endorsed by Siân Berry MP.

== Ideology ==
One concern of its members is ensuring the Green Party doesn't shift rightwards towards establishment centrist politics as some green parties in Europe have, and that the party instead strengthens ties to the labour movement. The organisation describes itself as supporting internationalism, anti-capitalism, eco-socialism and ecological transformation.

== Organisation ==
Following its foundation, six working groups were established with specific intents:

1. Organise GO internally, in part to increase ties between left-wing elements within the party.
2. Further democratise and reform the party.
3. Educate members about broader societal issues, such as class consciousness.
4. Improve the party's public communications.
5. Improve ties to workers and community organisations.
6. Improve the culture of the party.

While reporting on the 2025 Green leadership election, news site PoliticsHome reported that the campaign for Zack Polanski to lead the party shares many organisers with GO.

GO has been compared to Momentum, a left-wing group associated with Jeremy Corbyn's leadership of the Labour party.

In August 2025, the first steering committee of Greens Organise was elected.
