= Neil Carter (political scientist) =

British political scientist

- Education: Durham University; University of Bath
- Occupation: Political Scientist

Neil Carter is a British political scientist based at the University of York.

Carter graduated in Politics from Durham University and completed his postgraduate studies at the University of Bath.

His main research and teaching interests have focused on environmental politics and policy, and on British party politics. His most popular book is The Politics of the Environment. This was originally published in 2001 by Cambridge University Press, with a third, revised edition, released in 2018. He is associate editor of the journal Environmental Politics, published by Routledge.

== Publications ==
His publications include

- (2004) 'Politics As If Nature Mattered' in A. Leftwich (ed.) What is Politics? (Cambridge: Polity).
- (2002) 'Environmental Challenges' in P. Heywood, E. Jones and M. Rhodes (eds.) Developments in West European Politics 2, (Basingstoke: Palgrave), pp. 221–240.
- (2002) (with Keith Alderman) 'The Conservative Party Leadership Election of 2001', Parliamentary Affairs 55, 3, 569–585.
- (2001) The Politics of the Environment (Cambridge University Press).
- (2001) 'One Step Forward? Greens and the Environment in the 2001 British General Election', Environmental Politics, 10, 4, pp. 103–108.
