= Bold Politics with Zack Polanski =

British political podcast

- Genre: Political podcast
- Country of origin: United Kingdom
- Language: English

Cast and voices
- Hosted by: Zack Polanski

Technical specifications
- Video format: YouTube
- Audio format: Spotify; Apple Podcasts

Publication
- No. of episodes: 47
- Original release: 3 September 2025
- Provider: Acast

Related

YouTube information
- Channel: Bold Politics with Zack Polanski
- Years active: 2025–present
- Subscribers: 55,100
- Views: 4,655,808
- Last updated: 27 May 2026

Bold Politics with Zack Polanski is a weekly political podcast hosted by Zack Polanski, Leader of the Green Party of England and Wales. First released on 3 September 2025, a day after Polanski's victory in the 2025 Green Party leadership election, it is the first podcast to be hosted by a leader of a British political party. Bold Politics takes on a conversational format, featuring guests including Ash Sarkar, Gary Stevenson and Owen Jones. It is usually recorded at Acast Studios in central London.

== Background ==
Prior to his election as leader, Polanski has stated that too much time was being spent "complaining about media coverage for the Green party, and I still think that's legitimate. But I also think at some point you've just got to step up, and you've got to go even if all the odds are stacked against us. The Green Party's role is to cut through and to be able to tell an alternative story." On 2 September 2025, Polanski won the 2025 Green Party of England and Wales leadership election by a landslide.

== History ==
The first 35-minute episode of the podcast was released on 3 September 2025, during Polanski's "media blitz" following his victory. The New Statesman has argued that the podcast is "clearly intended as a left-wing counter to Nigel Farage’s prime-time daily GB News show, and the right-wing drift of so many 'podcast bros'."

The first episode featured Polanski talking to journalist and activist Ash Sarkar on the topics of wealth taxes, the future of the Green Party, and why they believed UK Prime Minister “Keir Starmer is spectacularly shit at politics." They also discussed their agreement on transgender rights and the Israeli–Palestinian conflict, including the proscription of Palestine Action, as well as Zohran Mamdani.

Guests Gary Stevenson and Zoe Gardner followed in subsequent episodes. At the Green Party's annual conference, Polanski was scheduled to record a live episode of Bold Politics with journalist Owen Jones.

As of 3 September 2025, future guests billed for the podcast included actor-director Jolyon Rubinstein. In December 2025, ex-Match of the Day presenter Gary Lineker appeared on the podcast. Lineker stated that there was "too much political influence from the very top" of the BBC, which he said had "tied itself up in knots” on the issue of impartiality; "what we really need is truth in reporting, in that sense. It’s impossible to be impartial on everything." Polanski also interviewed Lineker on his outspoken views on empathy for immigrants and his want for "proper peace" in Gaza.

== Reception ==
By 8 September, Bold Politics had reached fourth place in the UK news podcast charts.

Conservative papers The Times and The Telegraph rated the first episode of the podcast negatively, both giving it 2 out of 5 stars. The Times called it "nauseating left-wing populism", comparing it to the California governor Gavin Newsom's This Is Gavin Newsom podcast. The Telegraph noted that Ash Sarkar's inclusion may have been a "courtship of Sarkar's base, and therefore anyone considering joining [Jeremy] Corbyn and Zarah Sultana's Your Party." Both papers criticised the podcast for not sticking to conversation about the environment.

The Guardian noted the podcast in a weekly review of the best podcasts of the week, describing it as part of Polanski's "impressive media blitz".

== Episodes ==
No.	Episode title	Guest(s)	Running time	Original release date	Link
1	The Future Of Left Politics	Ash Sarkar	39 mins	3 September 2025	link at Apple Podcasts
2	How To Beat The Anti-Immigration Playbook	Zoe Gardner	25 mins	10 September 2025	link at Apple Podcasts
3	How To Confront The Radicalisation Of Young Men	Jimmy The Giant	44 mins	17 September 2025	link at Apple Podcasts
4	Why Rachel Reeves Is Obsessed With Growth At Any Cost	Grace Blakeley	33 mins	24 September 2025	link at Apple Podcasts
5	How Labour Sold Their Souls To Billionaires	Gary Stevenson	52 mins	1 October 2025	link at Apple Podcasts
6	The Death Of Two Party Politics	Owen Jones	34 mins	8 October 2025	link at Apple Podcasts
7	Why We Should Want Our Politicians To Be Flawed	Chlöe Swarbrick	33 mins	15 October 2025	link at Apple Podcasts
8	Should We Return To The EU?	Mike Galsworthy	33 mins	17 October 2025	link at Apple Podcasts
9	Are We Looking At The Economy All Wrong?	Richard Murphy	39 mins	22 October 2025	link at Apple Podcasts
10	How Can We All Be Better Allies?	Tia Kofi	27 mins	24 October 2025	link at Apple Podcasts
11	How Grass Roots Can Turn Into Global Movements	Mikaela Loach	45 mins	31 October 2025	link at Apple Podcasts
12	How A Mamdani Win Will Send Shockwaves Around The World	Hasan Piker	54 mins	31 October 2025	link at Apple Podcasts
13	Are We Failing The Next Generation?	Jordan Stephens	65 mins	5 November 2025	link at Apple Podcasts
14	How An Education System Became A Mental Health Crisis	Natasha Devon	42 mins	11 November 2025	link at Apple Podcasts
15	How To Platform Socialist Ideas Through Billionaire Owned Channels	George Monbiot	40 mins	19 November 2025	link at Apple Podcasts
16	How The Left Can Come Together To Beat Reform	Yanis Varoufakis	64 mins	26 November 2025	link at Apple Podcasts
17	How Can The Left Be Louder Than The Right?	NoJusticeMTG	30 mins	28 November 2025	link at Apple Podcasts
18	Why We Deserve Better Than Reeves And Starmer	Marina Purkiss and Jemma Forte	48 mins	3 December 2025	link at Apple Podcasts
19	Why There's No Such Thing As A 'Perfect Green'	Femi Oluwole	42 mins	5 December 2025	link at Apple Podcasts
20	How Rising Inequality Impacted The Trans Experience	Shon Faye	55 mins	10 December 2025	link at Apple Podcasts
21	Are Voters Losing Faith In Democracy?	Lewis Goodall	40 mins	12 December 2025	link at Apple Podcasts
22	Why The Media Is Looking At Economics All Wrong	James Meadway	44 mins	17 December 2025	link at Apple Podcasts
23	We Deserve Better In 2026	Gary Lineker	35 mins	31 December 2025	link at Apple Podcasts
24	How Antisemitism Is Used To Excuse War Crimes	Rachel Shabi	36 mins	7 January 2026	link at Apple Podcasts
25	Why A Vote For Reform UK Is A Vote For Russia	Carole Cadwalladr	50 mins	14 January 2026	link at Apple Podcasts
26	Why The System Just Isn’t Working	Nadia Sawalha and Mark Adderley	61 mins	21 January 2026	link at Apple Podcasts
27	Why Did Starmer Really Block Burnham From Running In Gorton and Denton?	Paul Holden	34 mins	28 January 2026	link at Apple Podcasts
28	Why The Left Can’t Agree On Everything	Kieran Andrieu	49 mins	29 January 2026	link at Apple Podcasts
29	What Happens When You Underfund Education	Daniel Kebede	36 mins	3 February 2026	link at Apple Podcasts
30	Everyone Deserves Equal Rights	Doris (UVW member)	18 mins	6 February 2026	link at Apple Podcasts
31	The Battle For The Soul Of The Nation	Hannah Spencer	62 mins	11 February 2026	link at Apple Podcasts
32	Why The Rich Get Richer	Faiza Shaheen	41 mins	18 February 2026	link at Apple Podcasts
33	What The F*** Is Going On?!	Mark Steel	43 mins	20 February 2026	link at Apple Podcasts
34	The Green Future	Caroline Lucas	46 mins	25 February 2026	link at Apple Podcasts
35	We Need Water Nationalisation Now	Feargal Sharkey	48 mins	4 March 2026	link at Apple Podcasts
36	The Science Of Prejudice	Keon West	41 mins	11 March 2026	link at Apple Podcasts
37	How Austerity Made Us Sicker	Dr Amir Khan	69 mins	18 March 2026	link at Apple Podcasts
38	Hope Is Here, It's All Of Us	Ross Hanson-Lowe	45 mins	25 March 2026	link at Apple Podcasts
39	Why we stopped trusting politicians	Cody Dahler	29 mins	3 April 2026	link at Apple Podcasts
40	The UK Prison Crisis	Shanice McBean and Janey Starling	34 mins	8 April 2026	link at Apple Podcasts
41	Why British History Needs A Retelling	Zakia Sewell	31 mins	15 April 2026	link at Apple Podcasts
42	The Online World is SO Unregulated	Sharon Gaffka	34 mins	22 April 2026	link at Apple Podcasts
43	The British Housing System Is Broken	Kwajo Tweneboa	57 mins	6 May 2026	link at Apple Podcasts
44	We Need To Democratise The UK Economy	Dhananjayan Sriskandarajah	37 mins	13 May 2026	link at Apple Podcasts
45	It’s Time to Decriminalise Sex Work	Audrey (Decrim Now organiser)	54 mins	20 May 2026	link at Apple Podcasts
46	What Does A Green Coalition Look Like?	Ernest Urtasun	35 mins	27 May 2026	link at Apple Podcasts
47	How Billionaires Avoid Tax	Gabriel Zucman	39 mins	3 June 2026	link at Apple Podcasts
