= Acast =

Swedish podcasting company

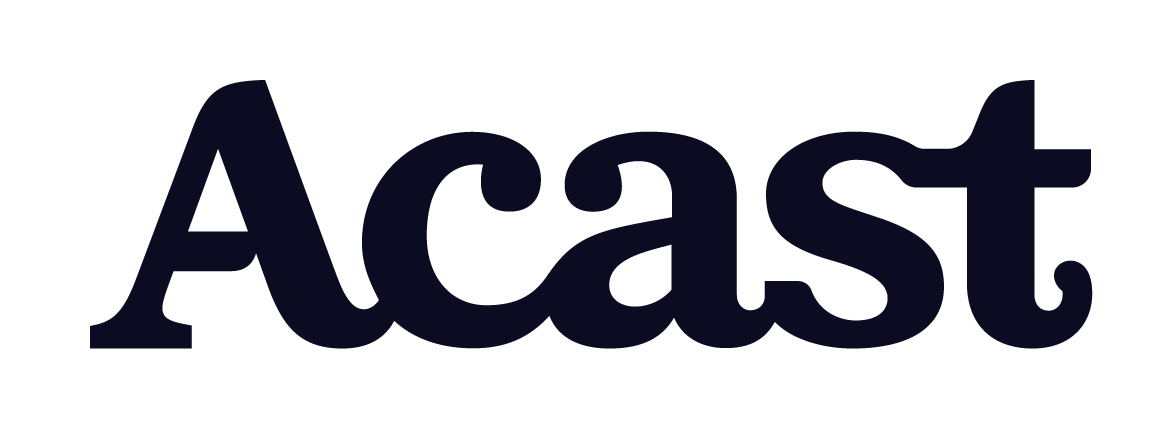
- Type: Public
- Traded as: First North: ACAST
- Industry: Podcasting; Advertising
- Founded: 2013; 13 years ago
- Founder: Karl Rosander; Måns Ulvestam
- Headquarters: Stockholm, Sweden
- Area served: Worldwide
- Services: media; data and insights; production
- Number of employees: 386
- Subsidiaries: Podchaser
- Website: acast.com

Acast is a Swedish-founded company that provides podcast hosting services and advertising-based revenue tools, and podcast advertising solutions for brands and media agencies. Launched in 2014, it developed dynamic insertion technology which can target advertising within podcasts based on location, time, and personal data, which has become the standard of the modern podcasting industry. The company champions an independent and open ecosystem for podcasting, where podcasts hosted with Acast are available on all podcast listening apps. Acast was founded by Karl Rosander and Måns Ulvestam in 2013; together with Johan Billgren as co-founder. Acast hosts over 140,000 podcasts, with over 330 million listens every month. The company operates worldwide with a physical presence in 15 countries, and has its headquarters in Stockholm.

In addition to the founders, Bonnier has also invested in the company. In 2018, additional investors stepped in with more than $67 million. In 2019, the European Investment Bank invested 25 million euros in Acast, and on 17 June 2021, Acast was listed on the Nasdaq First North Premier Market at a valuation of approximately SEK 7 billion.

Acast enables digital publishers to insert ads targeting defined audiences. The platform distributes, monetizes and markets podcasts including Giggly Squad, My Dad Wrote A Porno, The Adam Buxton Podcast and Toni and Ryan as well as publishers including The Guardian, The Economist, The Athletic, The Times and the Financial Times.

== History ==
In 2014, four months after launch, Acast was named Start-up of the Year by IDG magazine, Internetworld, and ‘Most innovative media service’ at the mobile industry awards Mobilgalan.

In May 2015, Acast closed a $5m Series A funding round, led by Bonnier Growth Media. This was supplemented by an undisclosed follow-on investment from early-stage venture capital firm MOOR, owned by Kaj Hed, majority owner of Rovio Entertainment.

In 2016, Acast launched a paid subscription service called Acast+.

In December 2018 the company raised $35 million from AP1 and Swedbank Robur (sv) funds Ny Teknik and Microcap in Series C funding. This has brought total funding to more than $67 million. In 2019, Acast acquired Pippa, another podcast hosting platform.

Since 2019, Acast has offered a free hosting tier for podcasts. The European Investment Bank invested €25 million in Acast in 2019.

In early 2021, Acast announced the acquisition of RadioPublic, a Boston-based startup founded by the public radio organization PRX.

In April 2021, rumours about an IPO on Nasdaq Stockholm surfaced. Founders Rosander and Ulvestam sold their last shares earlier in 2021, to fund their new startup Sesamy.

In March 2022, Acast announced that they would discontinue their podcast client app. The company cited its decreased importance as a source of user data and their preference for platform-independence in the decision.

In July 2022, Acast signed an agreement to acquire Podchaser, a platform-agnostic podcast database with user reviews, for $27 million by August 2022.

In August 2022, Acast was ranked #2 in Podtrac's ranking of ad sales networks for podcasts in the US.

In November 2022, Acast entered into a partnership with Amazon. Through the agreement Amazon Music bought all advertising space for thousands of Acast's podcasts, allowing Amazon customers to listen to those shows ad-free.

In February 2024, RadioPublic announced their app would close permanently at the end of March. After that date, RadioPublic show links began redirecting to the same shows on Podchaser.

In December 2024, Acast acquired creative production house Wonder Media Network.

In December 2025, it was announced that Acast had acquired Wake Word Studios, a Munich and Berlin-based creative audio and video studio and podcast producer. The acquisition expanded Acast’s operations in Germany, adding Wake Word Studios’ podcast catalogue to the Acast network and including its media planning platform, Podius, which continues to operate independently. Following completion of the transaction, Wake Word Studios was rebranded as Acast Creative Studios and became a wholly owned subsidiary of Acast.

== Notable podcasts hosted by Acast ==
=== Present ===
- The Adam Buxton Podcast
- Aunty Donna Podcast
- Bold Politics with Zack Polanski
- Distraction Pieces Podcast
- Dungeons & Daddies
- The Football Ramble
- Off Menu
- Political Currency
- Richard Herring's Leicester Square Theatre Podcast
- The Magnus Archives
- We're Alive
- WTF with Marc Maron

=== Past ===
- My Dad Wrote a Porno
