= Preferred prime minister opinion polling for the next United Kingdom general election =

In advance of the next United Kingdom general election various organisations continually conduct opinion polls asking voters which of the party leaders they would prefer as prime minister of the United Kingdom. Most of the polling companies listed are members of the British Polling Council (BPC) and abide by its disclosure rules. The dates of the polls range from the previous general election, held on 4 July 2024, to the present. In the tables below, total figures may not add up to 100%, due to rounding.

== Current party leaders ==
=== Burnham against others ===
Including hypothetical polls conducted prior to Andy Burnham's election as leader of the Labour Party on 17 July 2026 and subsequent appointment as Prime Minister.

==== Burnham vs Badenoch ====
Date(s) conducted	Pollster	Sample size	Andy Burnham	Kemi Badenoch	None	Don't know	Lead
18–20 Nov 2026	Opinium	2,007	40%	22%	27%	12%	18
4–6 Nov 2026	Opinium	2,003	41%	22%	26%	11%	19
1–2 Nov 2026	YouGov	2,355	40%	28%	6%	26%	12
29 Oct – 2 Nov 2026	Lord Ashcroft Polls (Note: Pollster is not a member of the British Polling Council.) (Note: Respondents were asked who they would rather have as prime minister.)	5,253	60%	40%	–	–	20
29 Oct – 2 Nov 2026	Lord Ashcroft Polls (Note: Respondents were asked who would make the best prime minister.)	5,253	45%	27%	–	28%	18
30 Oct – 1 Nov 2026	Freshwater Strategy	1,219	52%	35%	9%	4%	17
28–30 Oct 2026	Opinium	2,000	41%	21%	25%	12%	20
21–23 Oct 2026	Opinium	2,050	40%	21%	24%	14%	19
16–19 Oct 2026	More in Common	3,069	58%	42%	–	–	16
9–11 Oct 2026	Freshwater Strategy	1,235	47%	37%	13%	5%	10
7–9 Oct 2026	Opinium	2,050	40%	21%	25%	15%	19
30 Sep – 2 Oct 2026	Opinium	2,050	41%	20%	27%	12%	21
24–28 Sep 2026	Lord Ashcroft Polls	5,039	61%	39%	–	–	22
24–28 Sep 2026	Lord Ashcroft Polls	5,039	45%	27%	–	28%	18
23–25 Sep 2026	Opinium	2,050	40%	19%	27%	14%	20
16–18 Sep 2026	Opinium	2,050	38%	19%	29%	14%	19
9–11 Sep 2026	Opinium	2,050	38%	20%	28%	15%	18
4–6 Sep 2026	Freshwater Strategy	1,249	51%	33%	12%	4%	18
2–4 Sep 2026	Opinium	2,050	40%	19%	26%	15%	22
27 Aug – 1 Sep 2026	Lord Ashcroft Polls	5,063	62%	38%	–	–	24
27 Aug – 1 Sep 2026	Lord Ashcroft Polls	5,063	44%	25%	–	31%	19
26–28 Aug 2026	Opinium	2,003	37%	19%	27%	16%	18
26–27 Aug 2026	YouGov	2,114	42%	26%	5%	27%	16
12–14 Aug 2026	Opinium	2,050	38%	18%	27%	17%	20
7–10 Aug 2026	Freshwater Strategy	1,248	52%	34%	10%	5%	18
5–7 Aug 2026	Opinium	2,050	40%	18%	25%	17%	22
30 Jul – 3 Aug 2026	Lord Ashcroft Polls	5,303	63%	37%	–	–	26
30 Jul – 3 Aug 2026	Lord Ashcroft Polls	5,303	44%	25%	–	31%	19
29–31 Jul 2026	Opinium	2,050	39%	19%	24%	18%	20
23–24 Jul 2026	YouGov	2,111	38%	26%	6%	31%	12
17–20 Jul 2026	Andy Burnham is elected leader of the Labour Party and appointed Prime Minister three days later						
15–17 Jul 2026	Opinium	2,050	30%	25%	28%	17%	5
7–10 Jul 2026	Opinium	2,050	28%	24%	32%	16%	4
25–29 Jun 2026	Lord Ashcroft Polls	5,064	56%	44%	–	–	12
25–29 Jun 2026	Lord Ashcroft Polls	5,064	37%	29%	–	33%	8
23–24 Jun 2026	YouGov	2,381	32%	28%	6%	34%	4
19–22 Jun 2026	More in Common	2,993	54%	46%	–	–	8
28–29 Sep 2025	YouGov	2,353	31%	18%	9%	43%	13

==== Burnham vs Farage ====
Date(s) conducted	Pollster	Sample size	Andy Burnham	Nigel Farage	None	Don't know	Lead
18–20 Nov 2026	Opinium	2,007	47%	23%	23%	8%	24
4–6 Nov 2026	Opinium	2,003	47%	22%	23%	9%	25
1–2 Nov 2026	YouGov	2,355	50%	22%	6%	23%	28
29 Oct – 2 Nov 2026	Lord Ashcroft Polls	5,253	69%	31%	–	–	38
29 Oct – 2 Nov 2026	Lord Ashcroft Polls	5,253	56%	22%	–	22%	34
30 Oct – 1 Nov 2026	Freshwater Strategy	1,219	62%	30%	6%	2%	32
28–30 Oct 2026	Opinium	2,000	46%	23%	22%	9%	23
21–23 Oct 2026	Opinium	2,050	46%	21%	22%	11%	25
16–19 Oct 2026	More in Common	3,069	64%	36%	–	–	28
9–11 Oct 2026	Freshwater Strategy	1,235	52%	29%	15%	4%	23
7–9 Oct 2026	Opinium	2,050	45%	24%	21%	11%	21
30 Sep – 2 Oct 2026	Opinium	2,050	45%	24%	20%	11%	21
24–28 Sep 2026	Lord Ashcroft Polls	5,039	68%	32%	–	–	36
24–28 Sep 2026	Lord Ashcroft Polls	5,039	56%	22%	–	22%	34
23–25 Sep 2026	Opinium	2,050	44%	23%	22%	11%	21
16–18 Sep 2026	Opinium	2,050	43%	24%	23%	10%	19
9–11 Sep 2026	Opinium	2,050	43%	24%	22%	11%	19
4–6 Sep 2026	Freshwater Strategy	1,249	57%	30%	9%	4%	28
2–4 Sep 2026	Opinium	2,050	46%	23%	21%	10%	22
26–28 Aug 2026	Opinium	2,003	43%	24%	22%	11%	19
27 Aug – 1 Sep 2026	Lord Ashcroft Polls	5,063	66%	34%	–	–	32
27 Aug – 1 Sep 2026	Lord Ashcroft Polls	5,063	53%	22%	–	25%	31
26–27 Aug 2026	YouGov	2,114	52%	22%	5%	22%	30
12–14 Aug 2026	Opinium	2,050	45%	23%	22%	11%	22
7–10 Aug 2026	Freshwater Strategy	1,248	57%	32%	8%	3%	25
5–7 Aug 2026	Opinium	2,050	46%	23%	20%	12%	23
1–3 Aug 2026	JL Partners	2,048	53%	24%	–	23%	29
30 Jul – 3 Aug 2026	Lord Ashcroft Polls	5,303	71%	29%	–	–	42
30 Jul – 3 Aug 2026	Lord Ashcroft Polls	5,303	57%	19%	–	23%	38
29–31 Jul 2026	Opinium	2,050	45%	23%	21%	12%	22
23–24 Jul 2026	YouGov	2,111	48%	22%	5%	25%	26
17–20 Jul 2026	Andy Burnham is elected leader of the Labour Party and appointed Prime Minister three days later						
15–17 Jul 2026	Opinium	2,050	38%	25%	26%	12%	13
7–10 Jul 2026	Opinium	2,050	35%	25%	29%	11%	10
25–29 Jun 2026	Lord Ashcroft Polls	5,064	66%	34%	–	–	32
25–29 Jun 2026	Lord Ashcroft Polls	5,064	51%	25%	–	25%	26
23–24 Jun 2026	YouGov	2,381	43%	23%	6%	29%	20
19–22 Jun 2026	More in Common	2,993	62%	38%	–	–	24
6–10 Feb 2026	Ipsos	1,119	34%	28%	25%	13%	6
23–25 Jan 2026	More in Common	2,016	35%	30%	–	36%	5
9–12 Jan 2026	Ipsos	1,136	27%	29%	31%	–	2
28 Nov – 2 Dec 2025	Ipsos	1,124	33%	29%	27%	–	4
1–3 Oct 2025	Opinium	2,050	23%	32%	31%	14%	9
28–29 Sep 2025	YouGov	2,353	35%	25%	10%	30%	10
24–26 Sep 2025	Opinium	2,050	24%	31%	32%	13%	7
5–9 Sep 2025	Ipsos	2,272	27%	30%	28%	–	3

==== Burnham vs Davey ====
Date(s) conducted	Pollster	Sample size	Andy Burnham	Ed Davey	None	Don't know	Lead
1–2 Nov 2026	YouGov	2,355	47%	7%	6%	40%	40
16–19 Oct 2026	More in Common	3,069	70%	30%	–	–	40
26–27 Aug 2026	YouGov	2,114	44%	9%	5%	42%	35
23–24 Jul 2026	YouGov	2,111	41%	8%	5%	46%	33
23–24 Jun 2026	YouGov	2,381	32%	11%	7%	51%	21

==== Burnham vs Polanski ====
Date(s) conducted	Pollster	Sample size	Andy Burnham	Zack Polanski	None	Don't know	Lead
1–2 Nov 2026	YouGov	2,355	49%	7%	6%	38%	42
16–19 Oct 2026	More in Common	3,069	80%	20%	–	–	60
26–27 Aug 2026	YouGov	2,114	50%	8%	5%	37%	42
23–24 Jul 2026	YouGov	2,111	45%	9%	6%	40%	36
23–24 Jun 2026	YouGov	2,381	38%	11%	6%	45%	27

==== Burnham vs Lowe ====
Date(s) conducted	Pollster	Sample size	Andy Burnham	Rupert Lowe	None	Don't know	Lead
16–19 Oct 2026	More in Common	3,069	72%	28%	–	–	42

==== Burnham vs Badenoch vs Farage ====
Date(s) conducted	Pollster	Sample size	Andy Burnham	Kemi Badenoch	Nigel Farage	Others	None	Don't know	Lead
29 Oct – 2 Nov 2026	Lord Ashcroft Polls	5,253	45%	19%	14%	–	–	22%	27
30 Oct – 1 Nov 2026	Freshwater Strategy	1,219	47%	23%	21%	–	5%	4%	24
9–11 Oct 2026	Freshwater Strategy	1,235	41%	24%	24%	–	8%	3%	17
2–5 Oct 2026	Survation	1,974	42%	18%	21%	–	–	19%	21
24–28 Sep 2026	Lord Ashcroft Polls	5,039	45%	18%	15%	–	–	22%	27
22–23 Sep 2026	Survation	1,224	37%	21%	21%	–	–	21%	16
10–15 Sep 2026	Ipsos	1,031	35%	15%	14%	6%	10%	7%	20
9–10 Sep 2026	Survation	2,043	38%	20%	21%	–	–	21%	18
4–6 Sep 2026	Freshwater Strategy	1,249	45%	21%	21%	–	8%	6%	23
27 Aug – 1 Sep 2026	Lord Ashcroft Polls	5,063	44%	17%	15%	–	–	24%	27
30 Jul – 4 Aug 2026	Ipsos	1,033	36%	13%	15%	7%	20%	9%	21
30 Jul – 3 Aug 2026	Lord Ashcroft Polls	5,303	44%	17%	15%	–	–	25%	27
25–27 Jul 2026	Survation	1,012	34%	19%	22%	–	–	24%	12
22–24 Jul 2026	Survation	1,021	33%	19%	21%	–	–	27%	12
17–20 Jul 2026	Andy Burnham is elected leader of the Labour Party and appointed Prime Minister three days later								
25–30 Jun 2026	Ipsos	1,045	30%	13%	16%	8%	24%	8%	14
25–29 Jun 2026	Lord Ashcroft Polls	5,064	38%	20%	17%	–	–	26%	18
29–31 May 2026	Freshwater Strategy	1,237	29%	27%	27%	–	11%	6%	2
21–26 May 2026	Lord Ashcroft Polls	5,263	32%	19%	17%	–	–	32%	13

==== Burnham vs Badenoch vs Farage vs Polanski ====
Date(s) conducted	Pollster	Sample size	Andy Burnham	Kemi Badenoch	Nigel Farage	Zack Polanski	Others	None	Don't know	Lead
29–30 Apr 2026	BMG Research	1,521	12%	17%	23%	16%	4%	13%	15%	6

==== Burnham vs Badenoch vs Farage vs Davey vs Polanski ====
Date(s) conducted	Pollster	Sample size	Andy Burnham	Kemi Badenoch	Nigel Farage	Ed Davey	Zack Polanski	None	Don't know	Lead
30 Sep 2026	Convergent Opinion (Note: Respondents were shown a video of Burnham's Labour Party Conference speech. It's not clear whether these responses were before or after viewing the video.)	3,464	41%	14%	15%	4%	3%	13%	11%	26
5–6 Aug 2026	YouGov	2,108	30%	15%	18%	4%	7%		27%	12
17–20 Jul 2026	Andy Burnham is elected leader of the Labour Party and appointed Prime Minister three days later									
27 Jun 2026	Find Out Now	1,049	15%	11%	15%	5%	10%	25%	18%	Tie
19–22 Jun 2026	More in Common	2,993	19%	18%	18%	7%	7%	31%	–	1

==== Burnham vs Badenoch vs Farage vs Davey vs Polanski vs Lowe ====
Date(s) conducted	Pollster	Sample size	Andy Burnham	Kemi Badenoch	Nigel Farage	Ed Davey	Zack Polanski	Rupert Lowe	Others	None	Don't know	Lead
13–15 Nov 2026	More in Common	2,134	32%	18%	13%	4%	4%	5%	–	24%	–	14
6–9 Nov 2026	More in Common	2,013	32%	16%	13%	3%	4%	5%	–	26%	–	16
31 Oct – 1 Nov 2026	More in Common	2,602	31%	18%	14%	4%	4%	5%	–	24%	–	13
16–19 Oct 2026	More in Common	3,069	30%	16%	15%	4%	5%	5%	–	25%	–	14
9–12 Oct 2026	More in Common	2,101	32%	17%	13%	4%	4%	6%	–	24%	–	15
3–5 Oct 2026	More in Common	2,088	30%	15%	14%	5%	6%	7%	–	22%	–	15
11–15 Sep 2026	More in Common	2,038	29%	15%	15%	5%	5%	6%	–	25%	–	14

==== Burnham vs Badenoch vs Farage vs Davey vs Polanski vs Lowe vs Corbyn ====
Date(s) conducted	Pollster	Sample size	Andy Burnham	Kemi Badenoch	Nigel Farage	Ed Davey	Zack Polanski	Rupert Lowe	Jeremy Corbyn (Note: Jeremy Corbyn is the parliamentary leader of Your Party, which has a collective leadership.)	Others	None	Don't know	Lead
13 Aug 2026	Find Out Now	2,150	20%	11%	12%	3%	6%	8%	3%	2%	36%	–	8

=== Other Badenoch ===
==== Badenoch vs Farage ====
Date(s) conducted	Pollster	Sample size	Kemi Badenoch	Nigel Farage	None	Don't know	Lead
1–2 Nov 2026	YouGov	2,355	43%	15%	6%	36%	28
29 Oct – 2 Nov 2026	Lord Ashcroft Polls	5,253	75%	25%	–	–	50
30 Oct – 1 Nov 2026	Freshwater Strategy	1,219	54%	29%	14%	2%	25
16–19 Oct 2026	More in Common	3,069	67%	33%	–	–	34
9–11 Oct 2026	Freshwater Strategy	1,235	52%	29%	15%	4%	23
24–28 Sep 2026	Lord Ashcroft Polls	5,039	75%	25%	–	–	50
4–6 Sep 2026	Freshwater Strategy	1,249	52%	27%	16%	5%	25
27 Aug – 1 Sep 2026	Lord Ashcroft Polls	5,063	73%	27%	–	–	46
26–27 Aug 2026	YouGov	2,114	45%	16%	4%	35%	29
7–10 Aug 2026	Freshwater Strategy	1,248	53%	30%	14%	3%	22
30 Jul – 3 Aug 2026	Lord Ashcroft Polls	5,303	74%	26%	–	–	48
23–24 Jul 2026	YouGov	2,111	41%	17%	5%	37%	24
3–5 Jul 2026	Freshwater Strategy	1,240	49%	34%	15%	3%	15
25–29 Jun 2026	Lord Ashcroft Polls	5,064	73%	27%	–	–	46
23–24 Jun 2026	YouGov	2,381	38%	17%	7%	38%	21
21–26 May 2026	Lord Ashcroft Polls	5,263	73%	27%	–	–	46
9–11 May 2026	Freshwater Strategy	1,243	47%	35%	14%	4%	12
23–27 Apr 2026	Lord Ashcroft Polls	5,094	71%	29%	–	–	42
10–12 Apr 2026	Freshwater Strategy	1,250	43%	33%	23%		10
26–30 Mar 2026	Lord Ashcroft Polls	5,447	69%	31%	–	–	38
27 Feb – 1 Mar 2026	Freshwater Strategy	1,221	46%	34%	16%	4%	12
19–23 Feb 2026	Lord Ashcroft Polls	5,576	69%	31%	–	–	38
6–10 Feb 2026	Ipsos	1,119	23%	26%	39%	11%	3
6–10 Feb 2026	More in Common	2,035	64%	36%	–	–	28
30 Jan – 1 Feb 2026	Freshwater Strategy	1,250	43%	35%	18%	4%	8
15–19 Jan 2026	Lord Ashcroft Polls	5,448	66%	34%	–	–	32
15–18 Jan 2026	Opinium	2,047	20%	25%	41%	13%	5
9–12 Jan 2026	Ipsos	1,136	22%	24%	42%	–	2
9–11 Jan 2026	Freshwater Strategy	1,250	42%	36%	17%	5%	6
6–7 Jan 2026	YouGov	2,111	31%	21%	6%	41%	10
11–15 Dec 2025	Lord Ashcroft Polls	5,195	67%	33%	–	–	34
28 Nov – 2 Dec 2025	Ipsos	1,124	24%	25%	41%	–	1
28–30 Nov 2025	Freshwater Strategy	1,558	40%	36%	19%	5%	4
13–17 Nov 2025	Lord Ashcroft Polls	5,178	64%	36%	–	–	28
7–9 Nov 2025	Freshwater Strategy	1,250	39%	39%	18%	4%	Tie
16–20 Oct 2025	Lord Ashcroft Polls	5,038	64%	36%	–	–	28
8–10 Oct 2025	Opinium	2,015	19%	27%	42%	12%	8
3–5 Oct 2025	Freshwater Strategy	1,251	37%	41%	19%	3%	4
11–15 Sep 2025	Lord Ashcroft Polls	5,082	61%	39%	–	–	22
29–31 Aug 2025	Freshwater Strategy	1,251	34%	43%	19%	5%	9
14–18 Aug 2025	Lord Ashcroft Polls	5,029	61%	39%	–	–	22
3–4 Aug 2025	YouGov	2,216	21%	23%	4%	49%	2
1–3 Aug 2025	Freshwater Strategy	1,259	36%	41%	19%	5%	5
25–28 Jul 2025	Ipsos	1,150	19%	24%	48%	–	5
4–6 Jul 2025	Freshwater Strategy	1,259	33%	39%	23%	6%	6
26–30 Jun 2025	Lord Ashcroft Polls	5,018	60%	40%	–	–	20
6–8 Jun 2025	Freshwater Strategy	1,260	38%	40%	17%	5%	2
29 May – 2 Jun 2025	Lord Ashcroft Polls	5,147	60%	40%	–	–	20
18–19 May 2025	YouGov	2,212	29%	25%	4%	41%	4
10–14 Apr 2025	Lord Ashcroft Polls	5,263	64%	36%	–	–	28
13–17 Mar 2025	Lord Ashcroft Polls	5,111	64%	36%	–	–	28
6–9 Mar 2025	JL Partners	2,012	32%	34%	–	34%	2
13–17 Feb 2025	Lord Ashcroft Polls	5,099	63%	37%	–	–	26
6–7 Feb 2025	YouGov	2,275	22%	22%	11%	46%	Tie
16–20 Jan 2025	Lord Ashcroft Polls	5,231	64%	36%	–	–	28
13–17 Dec 2024	Ipsos	1,137	16%	23%	40%	–	7

==== Badenoch vs Davey ====
Date(s) conducted	Pollster	Sample size	Kemi Badenoch	Ed Davey	None	Don't know	Lead
1–2 Nov 2026	YouGov	2,355	36%	22%	6%	36%	14
16–19 Oct 2026	More in Common	3,069	62%	38%	–	–	24
26–27 Aug 2026	YouGov	2,114	33%	24%	5%	38%	9
23–24 Jul 2026	YouGov	2,111	32%	23%	6%	39%	9
6–10 Feb 2026	More in Common	2,035	60%	40%	–	–	20
6–7 Jan 2026	YouGov	2,111	27%	25%	7%	42%	2
3–4 Aug 2025	YouGov	2,216	18%	26%	8%	48%	8
18–19 May 2025	YouGov	2,212	21%	33%	4%	41%	12
6–7 Feb 2025	YouGov	2,275	17%	26%	11%	46%	9

==== Badenoch vs Polanski ====
Date(s) conducted	Pollster	Sample size	Kemi Badenoch	Zack Polanski	None	Don't know	Lead
1–2 Nov 2026	YouGov	2,355	40%	18%	6%	35%	22
16–19 Oct 2026	More in Common	3,069	70%	30%	–	–	40
26–27 Aug 2026	YouGov	2,114	39%	20%	5%	36%	19
23–24 Jul 2026	YouGov	2,111	36%	20%	6%	38%	16
6–10 Feb 2026	More in Common	2,035	65%	35%	–	–	30
6–7 Jan 2026	YouGov	2,111	28%	22%	7%	43%	6

==== Badenoch vs Lowe ====
Date(s) conducted	Pollster	Sample size	Kemi Badenoch	Rupert Lowe	None	Don't know	Lead
16–19 Oct 2026	More in Common	3,069	71%	29%	–	–	40

=== Other Farage ===
==== Farage vs Davey ====
Date(s) conducted	Pollster	Sample size	Nigel Farage	Ed Davey	None	Don't know	Lead
1–2 Nov 2026	YouGov	2,355	24%	34%	6%	36%	10
16–19 Oct 2026	More in Common	3,069	44%	56%	–	–	12
26–27 Aug 2026	YouGov	2,114	24%	38%	4%	34%	14
23–24 Jul 2026	YouGov	2,111	24%	35%	5%	35%	11
6–10 Feb 2026	More in Common	2,035	49%	51%	–	–	2
6–7 Jan 2026	YouGov	2,111	27%	33%	6%	33%	6
3–4 Aug 2025	YouGov	2,216	27%	31%	8%	35%	4
18–19 May 2025	YouGov	2,212	27%	41%	4%	27%	14
6–7 Feb 2025	YouGov	2,275	25%	30%	9%	36%	5

==== Farage vs Polanski ====
Date(s) conducted	Pollster	Sample size	Nigel Farage	Zack Polanski	None	Don't know	Lead
1–2 Nov 2026	YouGov	2,355	27%	26%	6%	52%	1
16–19 Oct 2026	More in Common	3,069	52%	48%	–	–	4
26–27 Aug 2026	YouGov	2,114	27%	31%	5%	37%	4
23–24 Jul 2026	YouGov	2,111	27%	29%	6%	38%	2
6–10 Feb 2026	Ipsos	1,119	32%	25%	30%	13%	7
6–10 Feb 2026	More in Common	2,035	54%	46%	–	–	8
9–12 Jan 2026	Ipsos	1,136	31%	21%	34%	–	10
6–7 Jan 2026	YouGov	2,111	27%	28%	7%	38%	1
28 Nov – 2 Dec 2025	Ipsos	1,124	31%	23%	32%	–	8

==== Farage vs Lowe ====
Date(s) conducted	Pollster	Sample size	Nigel Farage	Rupert Lowe	None	Don't know	Lead
16–19 Oct 2026	More in Common	3,069	48%	52%	–	–	4

=== Others ===
==== Davey vs Polanski ====
Date(s) conducted	Pollster	Sample size	Ed Davey	Zack Polanski	None	Don't know	Lead
1–2 Nov 2026	YouGov	2,355	29%	13%	6%	52%	16
16–19 Oct 2026	More in Common	3,069	71%	29%	–	–	42
26–27 Aug 2026	YouGov	2,114	28%	14%	5%	53%	14
23–24 Jul 2026	YouGov	2,111	27%	13%	6%	54%	14
6–7 Jan 2026	YouGov	2,111	20%	15%	8%	57%	5

==== Davey vs Lowe ====
Date(s) conducted	Pollster	Sample size	Ed Davey	Rupert Lowe	None	Don't know	Lead
16–19 Oct 2026	More in Common	3,069	65%	35%	–	–	30

==== Polanski vs Lowe ====
Date(s) conducted	Pollster	Sample size	Zack Polanski	Rupert Lowe	None	Don't know	Lead
16–19 Oct 2026	More in Common	3,069	45%	55%	–	–	10

== Former leaders ==
=== Starmer vs Badenoch ===
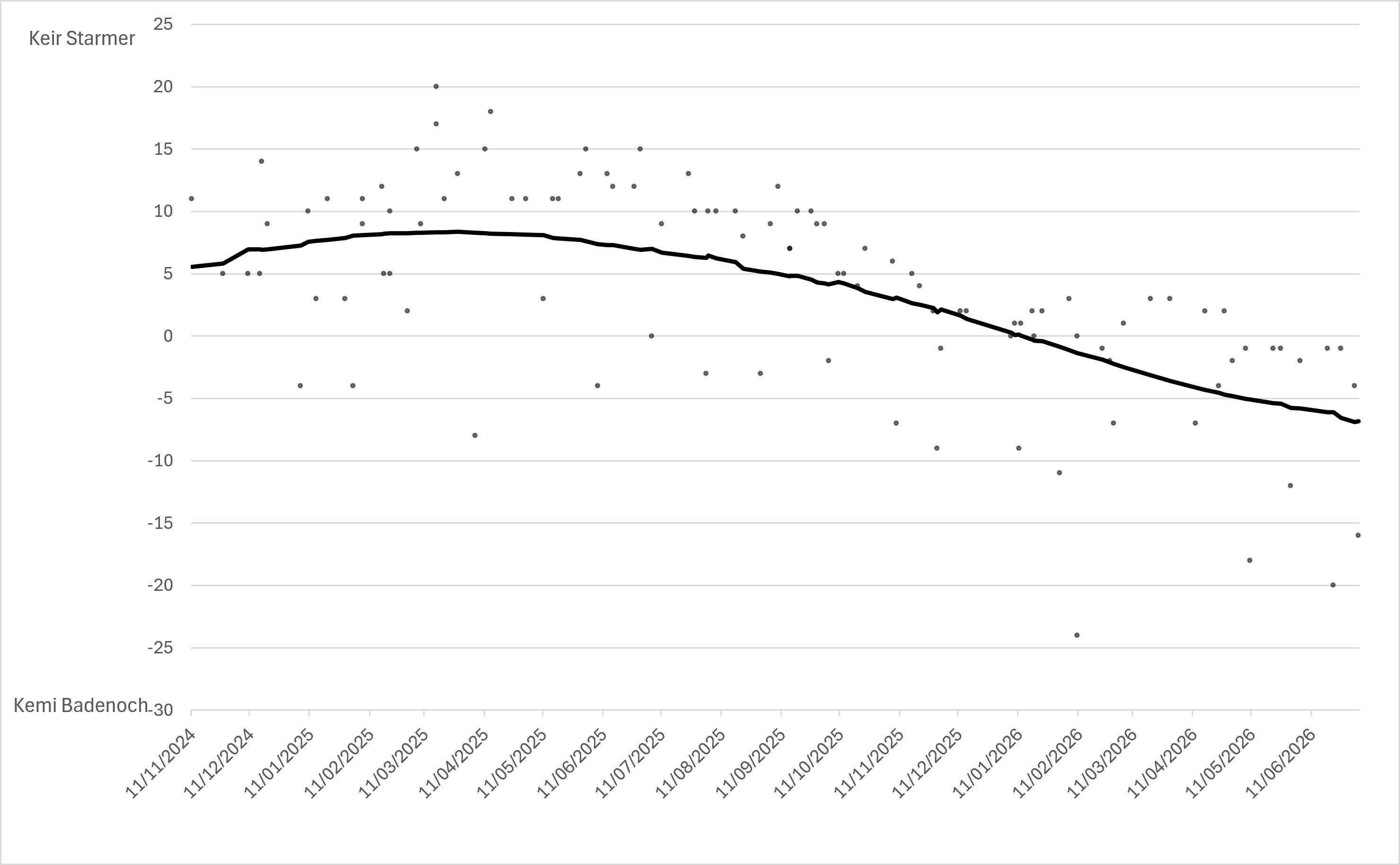

Date(s) conducted	Pollster	Sample size	Keir Starmer	Kemi Badenoch	None	Don't know	Lead
3–5 Jul 2026	Freshwater Strategy	1,240	32%	48%	17%	3%	16
1–3 Jul 2026	Opinium	2,050	20%	24%	44%	12%	4
24–26 Jun 2026	Opinium	2,050	21%	22%	46%	11%	1
19–22 Jun 2026	More in Common	2,993	40%	60%	–	–	20
17–19 Jun 2026	Opinium	2,050	22%	23%	44%	12%	1
3–5 Jun 2026	Opinium	2,050	21%	23%	43%	13%	2
29–31 May 2026	Freshwater Strategy	1,237	34%	46%	16%	3%	12
21–26 May 2026	Lord Ashcroft Polls	5,263	47%	53%	–	–	6
21–26 May 2026	Lord Ashcroft Polls	5,263	31%	32%	–	37%	1
20–22 May 2026	Opinium	2,050	22%	23%	45%	11%	1
9–11 May 2026	Freshwater Strategy	1,243	31%	49%	16%	4%	18
6–8 May 2026	Opinium	2,050	22%	23%	44%	11%	1
29 Apr – 1 May 2026	Opinium	2,051	22%	24%	43%	11%	2
23–27 Apr 2026	Lord Ashcroft Polls	5,094	49%	51%	–	–	2
23–27 Apr 2026	Lord Ashcroft Polls	5,094	32%	30%	–	37%	2
22–24 Apr 2026	Opinium	2,050	20%	24%	43%	13%	4
15–17 Apr 2026	Opinium	2,014	23%	21%	43%	14%	2
10–12 Apr 2026	Freshwater Strategy	1,250	33%	40%	27%		7
26–30 Mar 2026	Lord Ashcroft Polls	5,447	51%	49%	–	–	2
26–30 Mar 2026	Lord Ashcroft Polls	5,447	32%	29%	–	39%	3
18–20 Mar 2026	Opinium	2,050	23%	20%	45%	12%	3
4–6 Mar 2026	Opinium	2,050	21%	20%	45%	14%	1
27 Feb – 1 Mar 2026	Freshwater Strategy	1,221	34%	41%	20%	4%	7
25–27 Feb 2026	Opinium	2,050	20%	22%	45%	13%	2
19–23 Feb 2026	Lord Ashcroft Polls	5,576	48%	52%	–	–	4
19–23 Feb 2026	Lord Ashcroft Polls	5,576	32%	33%	–	35%	1
6–10 Feb 2026	Ipsos	1,119	27%	27%	35%	12%	Tie
6–10 Feb 2026	More in Common	2,035	38%	62%	–	–	24
4–6 Feb 2026	Opinium	2,054	22%	19%	46%	13%	3
30 Jan – 1 Feb 2026	Freshwater Strategy	1,250	31%	42%	25%	3%	11
21–23 Jan 2026	Opinium	2,050	22%	20%	45%	13%	2
15–19 Jan 2026	Lord Ashcroft Polls	5,448	48%	52%	–	–	4
15–19 Jan 2026	Lord Ashcroft Polls	5,448	29%	29%	–	42%	Tie
15–18 Jan 2026	Opinium	2,047	20%	18%	49%	14%	2
9–12 Jan 2026	Ipsos	1,136	26%	25%	38%	–	1
9–11 Jan 2026	Freshwater Strategy	1,250	31%	40%	22%	6%	9
7–9 Jan 2026	Opinium	2,050	21%	20%	48%	11%	1
6–7 Jan 2026	YouGov	2,111	28%	28%	7%	37%	Tie
11–15 Dec 2025	Lord Ashcroft Polls	5,195	48%	52%	–	–	4
11–15 Dec 2025	Lord Ashcroft Polls	5,195	30%	28%	–	41%	2
10–12 Dec 2025	Opinium	2,053	22%	20%	45%	13%	2
28 Nov – 2 Dec 2025	Ipsos	1,124	25%	26%	37%	–	1
28–30 Nov 2025	Freshwater Strategy	1,558	32%	41%	22%	5%	9
26–28 Nov 2025	Opinium	2,050	21%	19%	48%	11%	2
19–21 Nov 2025	Opinium	2,050	22%	18%	47%	13%	4
13–17 Nov 2025	Lord Ashcroft Polls	5,178	49%	51%	–	–	2
13–17 Nov 2025	Lord Ashcroft Polls	5,178	31%	26%	–	43%	5
7–9 Nov 2025	Freshwater Strategy	1,250	33%	40%	23%	5%	7
5–7 Nov 2025	Opinium	2,050	22%	16%	49%	13%	6
22–24 Oct 2025	Opinium	2,030	22%	15%	51%	13%	7
16–20 Oct 2025	Lord Ashcroft Polls	5,038	50%	50%	–	–	Tie
16–20 Oct 2025	Lord Ashcroft Polls	5,038	30%	26%	–	45%	4
10–13 Oct 2025	Ipsos	1,141	27%	22%	41%	–	5
8–10 Oct 2025	Opinium	2,015	23%	18%	47%	12%	5
3–5 Oct 2025	Freshwater Strategy	1,251	34%	36%	25%	4%	2
1–3 Oct 2025	Opinium	2,050	23%	14%	51%	13%	9
28–29 Sep 2025	YouGov	2,353	30%	21%	10%	39%	9
24–26 Sep 2025	Opinium	2,050	24%	14%	50%	13%	10
17–19 Sep 2025	Opinium	2,050	23%	13%	52%	13%	10
11–15 Sep 2025	Lord Ashcroft Polls	5,082	50%	50%	–	–	Tie
11–15 Sep 2025	Lord Ashcroft Polls	5,082	30%	23%	–	47%	7
11–15 Sep 2025	Opinium	2,011	21%	14%	51%	14%	7
5–9 Sep 2025	Ipsos	2,272	27%	15%	43%	–	12
3–5 Sep 2025	Opinium	2,050	24%	15%	48%	13%	9
29–31 Aug 2025	Freshwater Strategy	1,251	34%	37%	25%	4%	3
20–22 Aug 2025	Opinium	2,050	23%	15%	49%	14%	8
14–18 Aug 2025	Lord Ashcroft Polls	5,029	53%	47%	–	–	6
14–18 Aug 2025	Lord Ashcroft Polls	5,029	31%	21%	–	48%	10
6–8 Aug 2025	Opinium	2,050	24%	14%	50%	11%	10
3–4 Aug 2025	YouGov	2,216	30%	20%	8%	42%	10
1–3 Aug 2025	Freshwater Strategy	1,259	34%	37%	24%	5%	3
25–28 Jul 2025	Ipsos	1,150	29%	19%	43%	–	10
23–25 Jul 2025	Opinium	2,050	25%	12%	49%	14%	13
9–11 Jul 2025	Opinium	2,052	23%	14%	49%	14%	9
4–6 Jul 2025	Freshwater Strategy	1,259	36%	36%	23%	5%	Tie
26–30 Jun 2025	Lord Ashcroft Polls	5,018	55%	45%	–	–	10
26–30 Jun 2025	Lord Ashcroft Polls	5,018	30%	15%	–	55%	15
25–27 Jun 2025	Opinium	2,050	24%	12%	49%	14%	12
13–16 Jun 2025	Ipsos	1,135	28%	16%	46%	–	12
11–13 Jun 2025	Opinium	2,050	25%	12%	49%	14%	13
6–8 Jun 2025	Freshwater Strategy	1,260	34%	38%	21%	7%	4
29 May – 2 Jun 2025	Lord Ashcroft Polls	5,147	56%	44%	–	–	12
29 May – 2 Jun 2025	Lord Ashcroft Polls	5,147	31%	16%	–	53%	15
28–30 May 2025	Opinium	2,050	24%	11%	48%	17%	13
18–19 May 2025	YouGov	2,212	36%	25%	4%	35%	11
14–16 May 2025	Opinium	2,050	24%	13%	50%	13%	11
9–11 May 2025	Freshwater Strategy	1,250	36%	33%	25%	7%	3
30 Apr – 2 May 2025	Opinium	2,050	25%	14%	45%	15%	11
23–25 Apr 2025	Opinium	2,050	25%	14%	45%	16%	11
10–14 Apr 2025	Lord Ashcroft Polls	5,263	55%	45%	–	–	10
10–14 Apr 2025	Lord Ashcroft Polls	5,263	33%	15%	–	52%	18
9–11 Apr 2025	Opinium	2,050	28%	13%	43%	15%	15
4–6 Apr 2025	Freshwater Strategy	1,250	32%	40%	24%	5%	8
26–28 Mar 2025	Opinium	2,050	26%	13%	45%	16%	13
19–21 Mar 2025	Opinium	2,078	25%	14%	45%	15%	11
14–17 Mar 2025	Ipsos	1,132	33%	16%	43%	–	17
13–17 Mar 2025	Lord Ashcroft Polls	5,111	57%	43%	–	–	14
13–17 Mar 2025	Lord Ashcroft Polls	5,111	34%	14%	–	52%	20
6–9 Mar 2025	JL Partners	2,012	35%	24%	–	40%	9
5–7 Mar 2025	Opinium	2,050	28%	13%	42%	17%	15
1–2 Mar 2025	Freshwater Strategy	1,215	36%	34%	22%	8%	2
19–21 Feb 2025	Opinium	2,050	25%	15%	45%	15%	10
13–21 Feb 2025	JL Partners	6,049	35%	30%	–	35%	5
18 Feb 2025	Redfield & Wilton Strategies (Note: As of August 2026, Redfield & Wilton Strategies is no longer listed as a member of the British Polling Council. Its research archive of polling data is available only by subscription. All links to polling results are redirected to the company's website home page and are effectively dead links.)	1,500	32%	27%	–	41%	5
13–17 Feb 2025	Lord Ashcroft Polls	5,099	53%	47%	–	–	6
13–17 Feb 2025	Lord Ashcroft Polls	5,099	29%	17%	–	54%	12
6–7 Feb 2025	YouGov	2,275	31%	20%	10%	39%	11
5–7 Feb 2025	Opinium	2,050	24%	15%	46%	15%	9
31 Jan – 2 Feb 2025	Freshwater Strategy	1,200	33%	37%	24%	6%	4
28–29 Jan 2025	Survation	2,010	34%	31%	–	44%	3
16–20 Jan 2025	Lord Ashcroft Polls	5,231	52%	48%	–	–	4
16–20 Jan 2025	Lord Ashcroft Polls	5,231	29%	18%	–	53%	11
10–14 Jan 2025	JL Partners	2,007	29%	26%	–	44%	3
8–10 Jan 2025	Opinium	2,050	26%	16%	42%	16%	10
4–6 Jan 2025	Freshwater Strategy	1,207	34%	38%	21%	7%	4
18–20 Dec 2024	Opinium	2,010	25%	16%	41%	17%	9
13–17 Dec 2024	Ipsos	1,137	32%	18%	27%	–	14
12–16 Dec 2024	Survation	2,030	35%	30%	–	35%	5
6–10 Dec 2024	More in Common	2,432	28%	23%	49%	–	5
26–27 Nov 2024	YouGov	2,203	27%	22%	4%	47%	5
8–11 Nov 2024	Ipsos	1,139	30%	19%	38%	–	11
2 Nov 2024	Kemi Badenoch is elected leader of the Conservative Party						

=== Starmer vs Farage ===
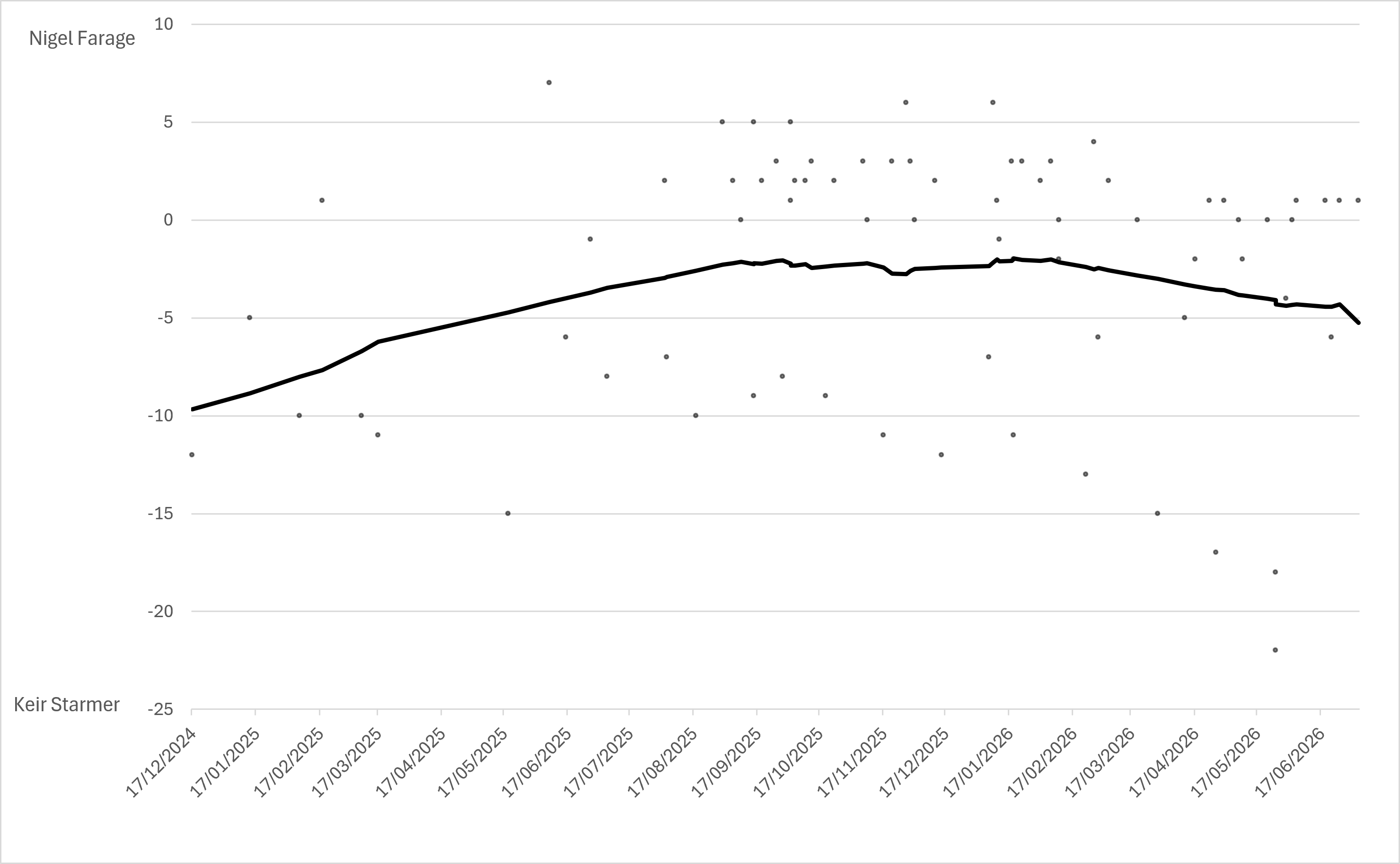

Date(s) conducted	Pollster	Sample size	Keir Starmer	Nigel Farage	None	Don't know	Lead
3–5 Jul 2026	Freshwater Strategy	1,240	41%	42%	14%	3%	1
1–3 Jul 2026	Opinium	2,050	27%	27%	37%	10%	Tie
24–26 Jun 2026	Opinium	2,050	26%	27%	40%	7%	1
19–22 Jun 2026	More in Common	2,993	53%	47%	–	–	6
17–19 Jun 2026	Opinium	2,050	26%	27%	38%	9%	1
3–5 Jun 2026	Opinium	2,050	26%	27%	37%	10%	1
29–31 May 2026	Freshwater Strategy	1,237	44%	40%	14%	2%	4
21–26 May 2026	Lord Ashcroft Polls	5,263	61%	39%	–	–	22
21–26 May 2026	Lord Ashcroft Polls	5,263	45%	27%	–	28%	18
20–22 May 2026	Opinium	2,050	27%	27%	37%	9%	Tie
9–11 May 2026	Freshwater Strategy	1,243	43%	41%	14%	3%	2
6–8 May 2026	Opinium	2,050	28%	28%	35%	9%	Tie
29 Apr – 1 May 2026	Opinium	2,051	27%	28%	37%	9%	1
23–27 Apr 2026	Lord Ashcroft Polls	5,094	60%	40%	–	–	20
23–27 Apr 2026	Lord Ashcroft Polls	5,094	44%	27%	–	29%	17
22–24 Apr 2026	Opinium	2,050	26%	27%	37%	10%	1
15–17 Apr 2026	Opinium	2,014	28%	26%	36%	10%	2
10–12 Apr 2026	Freshwater Strategy	1,250	42%	37%	22%		5
26–30 Mar 2026	Lord Ashcroft Polls	5,447	60%	40%	–	–	20
26–30 Mar 2026	Lord Ashcroft Polls	5,447	43%	28%	–	29%	15
18–20 Mar 2026	Opinium	2,050	27%	27%	36%	10%	Tie
4–6 Mar 2026	Opinium	2,050	26%	28%	37%	10%	2
27 Feb – 1 Mar 2026	Freshwater Strategy	1,221	44%	38%	15%	3%	6
25–27 Feb 2026	Opinium	2,050	25%	29%	35%	10%	4
19–23 Feb 2026	Lord Ashcroft Polls	5,576	58%	42%	–	–	16
19–23 Feb 2026	Lord Ashcroft Polls	5,576	42%	29%	–	28%	13
6–10 Feb 2026	Ipsos	1,119	32%	32%	28%	8%	Tie
6–10 Feb 2026	More in Common	2,035	51%	49%	–	–	2
4–6 Feb 2026	Opinium	2,054	26%	29%	34%	11%	3
30 Jan – 1 Feb 2026	Freshwater Strategy	1,250	40%	42%	17%	2%	2
21–23 Jan 2026	Opinium	2,050	27%	30%	33%	11%	3
15–19 Jan 2026	Lord Ashcroft Polls	5,448	58%	42%	–	–	16
15–19 Jan 2026	Lord Ashcroft Polls	5,448	40%	29%	–	32%	11
15–18 Jan 2026	Opinium	2,047	24%	27%	38%	11%	3
9–12 Jan 2026	Ipsos	1,136	32%	31%	29%	–	1
9–11 Jan 2026	Freshwater Strategy	1,250	41%	42%	14%	4%	1
7–9 Jan 2026	Opinium	2,050	24%	30%	37%	9%	6
6–7 Jan 2026	YouGov	2,111	36%	29%	7%	28%	7
11–15 Dec 2025	Lord Ashcroft Polls	5,195	57%	43%	–	–	14
11–15 Dec 2025	Lord Ashcroft Polls	5,195	41%	29%	–	30%	12
10–12 Dec 2025	Opinium	2,053	26%	28%	35%	11%	2
28 Nov – 2 Dec 2025	Ipsos	1,124	31%	31%	31%	–	Tie
28–30 Nov 2025	Freshwater Strategy	1,558	39%	42%	15%	4%	3
26–28 Nov 2025	Opinium	2,050	24%	30%	37%	9%	6
19–21 Nov 2025	Opinium	2,050	26%	29%	34%	10%	3
13–17 Nov 2025	Lord Ashcroft Polls	5,178	56%	44%	–	–	12
13–17 Nov 2025	Lord Ashcroft Polls	5,178	41%	30%	–	29%	11
7–9 Nov 2025	Freshwater Strategy	1,250	40%	40%	17%	4%	Tie
5–7 Nov 2025	Opinium	2,050	26%	29%	35%	10%	3
22–24 Oct 2025	Opinium	2,030	26%	28%	36%	10%	2
16–20 Oct 2025	Lord Ashcroft Polls	5,038	57%	43%	–	–	14
16–20 Oct 2025	Lord Ashcroft Polls	5,038	40%	31%	–	30%	9
10–13 Oct 2025	Ipsos	1,141	30%	33%	29%	–	3
8–10 Oct 2025	Opinium	2,015	27%	29%	33%	10%	2
3–5 Oct 2025	Freshwater Strategy	1,251	40%	42%	15%	3%	2
1–3 Oct 2025	Opinium	2,050	26%	31%	33%	10%	5
26 Sep – 3 Oct 2025	JL Partners	6,083	34%	35%	–	31%	1
28–29 Sep 2025	YouGov	2,353	36%	28%	10%	26%	8
24–26 Sep 2025	Opinium	2,050	27%	29%	34%	10%	2
17–19 Sep 2025	Opinium	2,050	26%	29%	35%	10%	3
11–15 Sep 2025	Lord Ashcroft Polls	5,082	55%	45%	–	–	10
11–15 Sep 2025	Lord Ashcroft Polls	5,082	39%	30%	–	31%	9
11–15 Sep 2025	Opinium	2,011	24%	29%	35%	11%	5
5–9 Sep 2025	Ipsos	2,272	30%	30%	30%	–	Tie
3–5 Sep 2025	Opinium	2,050	27%	29%	33%	11%	2
29–31 Aug 2025	Freshwater Strategy	1,251	38%	43%	16%	3%	5
14–18 Aug 2025	Lord Ashcroft Polls	5,029	57%	43%	–	–	14
14–18 Aug 2025	Lord Ashcroft Polls	5,029	40%	30%	–	30%	10
3–4 Aug 2025	YouGov	2,216	35%	28%	8%	29%	7
1–3 Aug 2025	Freshwater Strategy	1,259	40%	42%	15%	4%	2
25–28 Jul 2025	Ipsos	1,150	33%	25%	33%	–	8
4–6 Jul 2025	Freshwater Strategy	1,259	40%	39%	17%	4%	1
26–30 Jun 2025	Lord Ashcroft Polls	5,018	58%	42%	–	–	16
13–16 Jun 2025	Ipsos	1,135	32%	26%	35%	–	6
6–8 Jun 2025	Freshwater Strategy	1,260	38%	45%	13%	4%	7
29 May – 2 Jun 2025	Lord Ashcroft Polls	5,147	58%	42%	–	–	16
18–19 May 2025	YouGov	2,212	44%	29%	4%	23%	15
10–14 Apr 2025	Lord Ashcroft Polls	5,263	61%	39%	–	–	22
14–17 Mar 2025	Ipsos	1,132	36%	25%	32%	–	11
13–17 Mar 2025	Lord Ashcroft Polls	5,111	62%	38%	–	–	24
6–9 Mar 2025	JL Partners	2,012	43%	33%	–	25%	10
18 Feb 2025	Redfield & Wilton Strategies	1,500	36%	37%	–	26%	1
13–17 Feb 2025	Lord Ashcroft Polls	5,099	58%	42%	–	–	16
6–7 Feb 2025	YouGov	2,275	36%	26%	9%	28%	10
16–20 Jan 2025	Lord Ashcroft Polls	5,231	58%	42%	–	–	16
10–14 Jan 2025	JL Partners	2,007	38%	33%	–	29%	5
13–17 Dec 2024	Ipsos	1,137	37%	25%	21%	–	12

=== Starmer vs Davey ===
Date(s) conducted	Pollster	Sample size	Keir Starmer	Ed Davey	None	Don't know	Lead
6–10 Feb 2026	More in Common	2,035	40%	60%	–	–	20
6–7 Jan 2026	YouGov	2,111	19%	23%	8%	51%	4
3–4 Aug 2025	YouGov	2,216	20%	20%	9%	52%	Tie
18–19 May 2025	YouGov	2,212	27%	25%	5%	44%	2
6–7 Feb 2025	YouGov	2,275	24%	16%	11%	49%	8

=== Starmer vs Polanski ===
Date(s) conducted	Pollster	Sample size	Keir Starmer	Zack Polanski	None	Don't know	Lead
6–10 Feb 2026	Ipsos	1,119	21%	16%	48%	14%	5
6–10 Feb 2026	More in Common	2,035	51%	49%	–	–	2
9–12 Jan 2026	Ipsos	1,136	22%	12%	50%	–	10
6–7 Jan 2026	YouGov	2,111	21%	19%	9%	51%	2
28 Nov – 2 Dec 2025	Ipsos	1,124	22%	16%	48%	–	6

=== Starmer vs Badenoch vs Farage ===
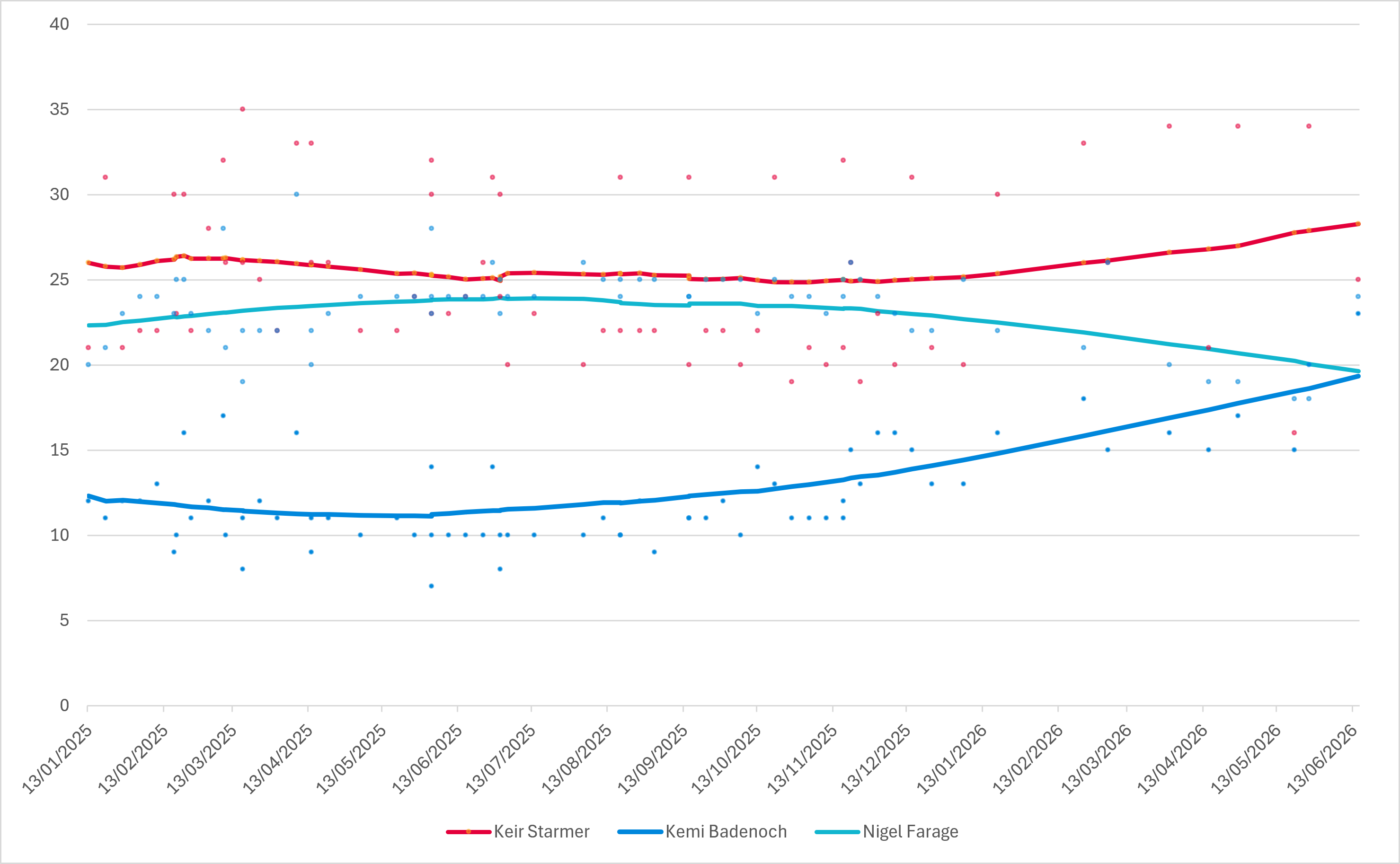

Date(s) conducted	Pollster	Sample size	Keir Starmer	Kemi Badenoch	Nigel Farage	Others	None	Don't know	Lead
11–15 Jun 2026	Survation	1,003	25%	23%	24%	–	–	28%	1
21–26 May 2026	Lord Ashcroft Polls	5,263	34%	20%	18%	–	–	28%	14
13–20 May 2026	Ipsos	1,137	16%	15%	18%	11%	31%	8%	2
23–27 Apr 2026	Lord Ashcroft Polls	5,094	34%	17%	19%	–	–	29%	15
9–15 Apr 2026	Ipsos	1,044	21%	15%	19%	11%	27%	7%	2
26–30 Mar 2026	Lord Ashcroft Polls	5,447	34%	16%	20%	–	–	30%	14
5–11 Mar 2026	Ipsos	1,062	22%	11%	19%	10%	29%	8%	3
5 Mar 2026	Survation	1,045	26%	15%	26%	–	–	33%	Tie
19–23 Feb 2026	Lord Ashcroft Polls	5,576	33%	18%	21%	–	–	28%	12
22–27 Jan 2026	Ipsos	1,104	18%	12%	21%	10%	31%	9%	3
15–19 Jan 2026	Lord Ashcroft Polls	5,448	30%	16%	22%	–	–	32%	8
2–5 Jan 2026	More in Common	2,021	20%	13%	25%	–	42%	–	5
19–23 Dec 2025	More in Common	2,026	21%	13%	22%	–	43%	–	1
11–15 Dec 2025	Lord Ashcroft Polls	5,195	31%	15%	22%	–	–	32%	9
4–8 Dec 2025	More in Common	2,009	20%	16%	23%	–	41%	–	3
28 Nov – 1 Dec 2025	More in Common	2,114	23%	16%	24%	–	37%	–	1
22–24 Nov 2025	More in Common	2,062	19%	13%	25%	–	43%	–	6
16–20 Nov 2025	Survation	2,082	26%	15%	26%	–	–	33%	Tie
14–17 Nov 2025	More in Common	2,052	21%	11%	25%	–	44%	–	4
13–17 Nov 2025	Lord Ashcroft Polls	5,178	32%	12%	24%	–	–	31%	8
7–10 Nov 2025	More in Common	2,011	20%	11%	23%	–	46%	–	3
30 Oct – 5 Nov 2025	Ipsos	1,148	17%	9%	25%	9%	32%	9%	8
31 Oct – 3 Nov 2025	More in Common	2,031	21%	11%	24%	–	43%	–	3
24–27 Oct 2025	More in Common	2,030	19%	11%	24%	–	46%	–	5
16–20 Oct 2025	Lord Ashcroft Polls	5,038	31%	13%	25%	–	–	32%	6
10–13 Oct 2025	More in Common	2,004	22%	14%	23%	–	41%	–	1
3–6 Oct 2025	More in Common	2,003	20%	10%	25%	–	46%	–	5
26–29 Sep 2025	More in Common	2,012	22%	12%	25%	–	41%	–	3
19–22 Sep 2025	More in Common	2,055	22%	11%	25%	–	42%	–	3
11–17 Sep 2025	Ipsos	1,157	19%	9%	25%	8%	31%	8%	6
12–15 Sep 2025	More in Common	2,037	20%	11%	24%	–	44%	–	4
11–15 Sep 2025	Lord Ashcroft Polls	5,082	31%	11%	24%	–	–	32%	7
29 Aug – 1 Sep 2025	More in Common	2,042	22%	9%	25%	–	43%	–	3
22–26 Aug 2025	More in Common	2,032	22%	12%	25%	–	40%	–	3
15–18 Aug 2025	More in Common	2,000	22%	10%	24%	–	43%	–	2
14–18 Aug 2025	Lord Ashcroft Polls	5,029	31%	10%	25%	–	–	34%	6
8–11 Aug 2025	More in Common	2,015	22%	11%	25%	–	41%	–	3
1–3 Aug 2025	More in Common	2,042	20%	10%	26%	–	43%	–	6
18–20 Jul 2025	More in Common	2,153	22%	10%	27%	–	41%	–	5
11–14 Jul 2025	More in Common	3,026	23%	10%	24%	–	43%	–	1
2–3 Jul 2025	More in Common	1,855	20%	10%	24%	–	46%	–	4
27–30 Jun 2025	More in Common	2,532	24%	10%	25%	–	42%	–	1
26–30 Jun 2025	Lord Ashcroft Polls	5,018	30%	8%	23%	–	–	39%	7
25–27 Jun 2025	Survation	2,002	31%	14%	26%	–	–	29%	5
20–23 Jun 2025	More in Common	2,004	26%	10%	24%	–	40%	–	2
13–16 Jun 2025	More in Common	2,032	24%	10%	24%	–	42%	–	Tie
6–9 Jun 2025	More in Common	2,073	23%	10%	24%	–	43%	–	1
30 May – 2 Jun 2025	Survation	1,096	32%	14%	28%	–	–	26%	4
30 May – 2 Jun 2025	More in Common	2,016	23%	10%	24%	–	43%	–	1
29 May – 2 Jun 2025	Lord Ashcroft Polls	5,147	30%	7%	23%	–	–	39%	7
23–26 May 2025	More in Common	2,000	24%	10%	24%	–	42%	–	Tie
16–19 May 2025	More in Common	2,090	22%	11%	24%	–	43%	–	2
3–4 May 2025	More in Common	2,212	22%	10%	24%	–	44%	–	2
17–21 Apr 2025	More in Common	2,004	26%	11%	23%	–	40%	–	3
11–14 Apr 2025	More in Common	2,277	26%	11%	22%	–	41%	–	4
10–14 Apr 2025	Lord Ashcroft Polls	5,263	33%	9%	20%	–	–	37%	13
2–8 Apr 2025	JL Partners	2,086	33%	16%	30%	–	–	21%	3
28–31 Mar 2025	More in Common	2,081	22%	11%	22%	–	45%	–	Tie
22–24 Mar 2025	More in Common	2,077	25%	12%	22%	–	41%	–	3
14–17 Mar 2025	More in Common	2,432	26%	11%	22%	–	41%	–	4
13–17 Mar 2025	Lord Ashcroft Polls	5,111	35%	8%	19%	–	–	38%	16
7–10 Mar 2025	More in Common	2,041	26%	10%	21%	–	43%	–	5
6–9 Mar 2025	JL Partners	2,012	32%	17%	28%	–	–	23%	4
28 Feb – 3 Mar 2025	More in Common	2,010	28%	12%	22%	–	38%	–	6
21–24 Feb 2025	More in Common	2,013	22%	11%	23%	–	44%	–	1
13–21 Feb 2025	JL Partners	6,049	30%	16%	25%	–	–	30%	5
14–18 Feb 2025	More in Common	4,101	23%	10%	25%	–	43%	–	2
13–17 Feb 2025	Lord Ashcroft Polls	5,099	30%	9%	23%	–	–	38%	7
7–10 Feb 2025	More in Common	2,005	22%	13%	24%	–	41%	–	2
31 Jan – 3 Feb 2025	More in Common	2,044	22%	12%	24%	–	42%	–	2
24–27 Jan 2025	More in Common	2,009	21%	12%	23%	–	44%	–	2
16–20 Jan 2025	Lord Ashcroft Polls	5,231	31%	11%	21%	–	–	37%	10
10–13 Jan 2025	More in Common	2,005	21%	12%	20%	–	47%	–	1

=== Starmer vs Badenoch vs Farage vs Davey ===
Date(s) conducted	Pollster	Sample size	Keir Starmer	Kemi Badenoch	Nigel Farage	Ed Davey	None	Don't know	Lead
10–11 Jun 2025	Survation	2,010	23%	13%	25%	9%	22%	9%	2
6–7 Apr 2025	YouGov	2,178	21%	5%	16%	7%	37%	13%	5
17 Jan 2025	YouGov	2,266	19%	9%	20%	8%	34%	–	1

=== Starmer vs Badenoch vs Farage vs Polanski ===
Date(s) conducted	Pollster	Sample size	Keir Starmer	Kemi Badenoch	Nigel Farage	Zack Polanski	Others	None	Don't know	Lead
29–30 Apr 2026	BMG Research	1,521	16%	15%	22%	14%	6%	13%	13%	6

=== Starmer vs Badenoch vs Farage vs Davey vs Polanski ===
Date(s) conducted	Pollster	Sample size	Keir Starmer	Kemi Badenoch	Nigel Farage	Ed Davey	Zack Polanski	None	Don't know	Lead
19–22 Jun 2026	More in Common	2,993	15%	18%	18%	6%	8%	34%	–	Tie
29 May – 1 Jun 2026	More in Common	2,211	16%	15%	19%	6%	6%	37%	–	3
1–4 May 2026	More in Common	2,016	17%	16%	19%	6%	6%	36%	–	2
10–13 Apr 2026	More in Common	2,011	17%	15%	19%	6%	8%	36%	–	2
2–7 Apr 2026	More in Common	2,009	16%	14%	20%	6%	6%	37%	–	4
28–30 Mar 2026	More in Common	2,003	16%	14%	22%	6%	7%	36%	–	6
20–22 Mar 2026	More in Common	2,408	16%	15%	20%	6%	8%	34%	–	4
6–10 Feb 2026	More in Common	2,035	15%	15%	21%	7%	5%	37%	–	6

=== Starmer vs Badenoch vs Farage vs Davey vs Polanski vs Lowe ===
Date(s) conducted	Pollster	Sample size	Keir Starmer	Kemi Badenoch	Nigel Farage	Ed Davey	Zack Polanski	Rupert Lowe	None	Don't know	Lead
18 Mar 2026	Find Out Now	1,000	9%	8%	15%	5%	12%	7%	–	44%	3

=== Starmer vs Sunak ===
Date(s) conducted	Pollster	Sample size	Keir Starmer	Rishi Sunak	None	Don't know	Lead
18–20 Oct 2024	Savanta	2,135	39%	32%	45%	11%	7
2–4 Oct 2024	Opinium	2,003	25%	19%	45%	–	6
25–27 Sep 2024	Opinium	2,049	27%	18%	46%	10%	9
24–25 Sep 2024	More in Common	2,080	54%	46%	–	–	8
18–20 Sep 2024	Opinium	2,050	28%	18%	44%	10%	10
28–30 Aug 2024	Opinium	2,040	34%	15%	40%	11%	19
14–16 Aug 2024	Opinium	1,996	36%	16%	37%	12%	20
31 Jul – 2 Aug 2024	Opinium	2,063	38%	14%	37%	11%	24
17–19 Jul 2024	Opinium	2,010	37%	14%	34%	15%	23

=== Starmer vs Sunak vs Farage vs Davey vs Denyer vs Ramsay ===
Date(s) conducted	Pollster	Sample size	Keir Starmer	Rishi Sunak	Nigel Farage	Ed Davey	Carla Denyer	Adrian Ramsay	None	Don't know	Lead
7–8 Aug 2024	We Think	1,278	26%	10%	20%	5%	2%	2%	20%	15%	6
25–26 Jul 2024	We Think	2,012	30%	11%	18%	4%	3%	1%	18%	15%	12
11–12 Jul 2024	We Think	2,005	30%	11%	14%	5%	4%	1%	20%	13%	16

== Hypothetical leaders ==
=== Different Conservative leaders ===
These polls were conducted prior to Kemi Badenoch's election as leader of the Conservative Party on 2 November 2024.

==== Starmer vs Badenoch ====
Date(s) conducted	Pollster	Sample size	Keir Starmer	Kemi Badenoch	None	Don't know	Lead
30–31 Oct 2024	YouGov	2,234	27%	20%	47%	6%	7
18–20 Oct 2024	Savanta	2,135	41%	23%	–	35%	18

==== Starmer vs Jenrick ====
Date(s) conducted	Pollster	Sample size	Keir Starmer	Robert Jenrick	None	Don't know	Lead
30–31 Oct 2024	YouGov	2,234	29%	21%	45%	5%	8
18–20 Oct 2024	Savanta	2,135	41%	25%	–	35%	16

=== Different Labour leaders ===
These polls were conducted prior to Keir Starmer's announcement on 22 June 2026 that he would resign as leader of the Labour Party and Prime Minister, and prior to Andy Burnham's election as leader of the Labour Party on 17 July 2026.

==== Starmer vs Burnham ====
Date(s) conducted	Pollster	Sample size	Keir Starmer	Andy Burnham	None	Don't know	Lead
19–22 Jun 2026	More in Common	2,993	33%	67%	–	–	34
5–9 Jun 2026	Ipsos	2,247	12%	25%	50%	13%	13
12–21 May 2026	JL Partners	3,003	26%	36%	–	38%	22
15–19 May 2026	Ipsos	1,169	15%	27%	39%	19%	12
6–10 Feb 2026	Ipsos	1,119	16%	30%	41%	14%	14
23–25 Jan 2026	More in Common	2,016	21%	30%	–	49%	9
9–12 Jan 2026	Ipsos	1,136	17%	24%	45%	–	7
28 Nov – 2 Dec 2025	Ipsos	1,124	15%	28%	42%	–	13
10–13 Oct 2025	Ipsos	1,141	17%	26%	43%	–	9
1–3 Oct 2025	Opinium	2,050	18%	21%	45%	16%	3
28–29 Sep 2025	YouGov	2,353	16%	28%	11%	45%	12
5–9 Sep 2025	Ipsos	2,272	20%	25%	38%	–	5

==== Starmer vs Streeting ====
Date(s) conducted	Pollster	Sample size	Keir Starmer	Wes Streeting	None	Don't know	Lead
12–21 May 2026	JL Partners	3,003	32%	24%	–	44%	8
15–19 May 2026	Ipsos	1,169	19%	12%	51%	18%	7
6–10 Feb 2026	Ipsos	1,119	22%	13%	49%	16%	9
9–12 Jan 2026	Ipsos	1,136	20%	13%	52%	–	7
28 Nov – 2 Dec 2025	Ipsos	1,124	19%	13%	54%	–	6
5–9 Sep 2025	Ipsos	2,272	23%	10%	49%	–	13

==== Starmer vs Miliband ====
Date(s) conducted	Pollster	Sample size	Keir Starmer	Ed Miliband	None	Don't know	Lead
12–21 May 2026	JL Partners	3,003	35%	21%	–	44%	14
15–19 May 2026	Ipsos	1,169	20%	11%	52%	18%	9
28 Nov – 2 Dec 2025	Ipsos	1,124	20%	12%	55%	–	8

==== Starmer vs Rayner ====
Date(s) conducted	Pollster	Sample size	Keir Starmer	Angela Rayner	None	Don't know	Lead
12–21 May 2026	JL Partners	3,003	34%	21%	–	45%	13
15–19 May 2026	Ipsos	1,169	20%	12%	52%	17%	8
6–10 Feb 2026	Ipsos	1,119	21%	12%	57%	11%	9
9–12 Jan 2026	Ipsos	1,136	22%	9%	56%	–	13

==== Starmer vs Mahmood ====
Date(s) conducted	Pollster	Sample size	Keir Starmer	Shabana Mahmood	None	Don't know	Lead
12–21 May 2026	JL Partners	3,003	35%	18%	–	46%	17

==== Streeting vs Burnham ====
Date(s) conducted	Pollster	Sample size	Wes Streeting	Andy Burnham	None	Don't know	Lead
15–19 May 2026	Ipsos	1,169	9%	31%	40%	20%	22

==== Streeting vs Rayner ====
Date(s) conducted	Pollster	Sample size	Wes Streeting	Angela Rayner	None	Don't know	Lead
15–19 May 2026	Ipsos	1,169	17%	15%	49%	18%	2

==== Streeting vs Miliband ====
Date(s) conducted	Pollster	Sample size	Wes Streeting	Ed Miliband	None	Don't know	Lead
15–19 May 2026	Ipsos	1,169	17%	15%	50%	19%	2

==== Rayner vs Streeting vs Miliband vs Burnham ====
Date(s) conducted	Pollster	Sample size	Angela Rayner	Wes Streeting	Ed Miliband	Andy Burnham	None	Don't know	Lead
19–23 Feb 2026	Lord Ashcroft Polls	5,576	6%	6%	8%	27%	–	54%	19

==== Starmer vs Streeting vs Mahmood vs Rayner vs Miliband ====
Date(s) conducted	Pollster	Sample size	Keir Starmer	Wes Streeting	Shabana Mahmood	Angela Rayner	Ed Miliband	None	Don't know	Lead
13–17 Nov 2025	Lord Ashcroft Polls	5,178	11%	10%	2%	6%	8%	–	62%	1

=== Different Labour leaders against other party leaders ===
==== Streeting ====
===== Streeting vs Farage =====
Date(s) conducted	Pollster	Sample size	Wes Streeting	Nigel Farage	None	Don't know	Lead
6–10 Feb 2026	Ipsos	1,119	25%	31%	32%	13%	6
9–12 Jan 2026	Ipsos	1,136	23%	29%	34%	–	6
28 Nov – 2 Dec 2025	Ipsos	1,124	24%	31%	32%	–	7
5–9 Sep 2025	Ipsos	2,272	18%	32%	33%	–	14

===== Streeting vs Badenoch vs Farage =====
Date(s) conducted	Pollster	Sample size	Wes Streeting	Kemi Badenoch	Nigel Farage	None	Don't know	Lead
21–26 May 2026	Lord Ashcroft Polls	5,263	18%	22%	19%	–	41%	4

===== Streeting vs Badenoch vs Farage vs Polanski =====
Date(s) conducted	Pollster	Sample size	Wes Streeting	Kemi Badenoch	Nigel Farage	Zack Polanski	Others	None	Don't know	Lead
29–30 Apr 2026	BMG Research	1,521	6%	18%	23%	19%	5%	14%	15%	4

==== Miliband ====
===== Miliband vs Farage =====
Date(s) conducted	Pollster	Sample size	Ed Miliband	Nigel Farage	None	Don't know	Lead
28 Nov – 2 Dec 2025	Ipsos	1,124	25%	31%	35%	–	6

===== Miliband vs Badenoch vs Farage =====
Date(s) conducted	Pollster	Sample size	Ed Miliband	Kemi Badenoch	Nigel Farage	None	Don't know	Lead
21–26 May 2026	Lord Ashcroft Polls	5,263	23%	22%	19%	–	36%	1

===== Miliband vs Badenoch vs Farage vs Polanski =====
Date(s) conducted	Pollster	Sample size	Ed Miliband	Kemi Badenoch	Nigel Farage	Zack Polanski	Others	None	Don't know	Lead
29–30 Apr 2026	BMG Research	1,521	8%	17%	23%	18%	4%	14%	15%	5

==== Rayner ====
===== Rayner vs Farage =====
Date(s) conducted	Pollster	Sample size	Angela Rayner	Nigel Farage	None	Don't know	Lead
6–10 Feb 2026	Ipsos	1,119	25%	34%	31%	10%	9
9–12 Jan 2026	Ipsos	1,136	22%	32%	36%	–	10

===== Rayner vs Badenoch vs Farage =====
Date(s) conducted	Pollster	Sample size	Angela Rayner	Kemi Badenoch	Nigel Farage	None	Don't know	Lead
21–26 May 2026	Lord Ashcroft Polls	5,263	21%	23%	19%	–	37%	2

===== Rayner vs Badenoch vs Farage vs Polanski =====
Date(s) conducted	Pollster	Sample size	Angela Rayner	Kemi Badenoch	Nigel Farage	Zack Polanski	Others	None	Don't know	Lead
29–30 Apr 2026	BMG Research	1,521	9%	17%	24%	17%	5%	13%	15%	7

==== Mahmood ====
===== Mahmood vs Badenoch vs Farage vs Polanski =====
Date(s) conducted	Pollster	Sample size	Shabana Mahmood	Kemi Badenoch	Nigel Farage	Zack Polanski	Others	None	Don't know	Lead
29–30 Apr 2026	BMG Research	1,521	3%	18%	24%	20%	5%	15%	15%	4

=== With Your Party leaders prior to formation ===
In July 2025, Jeremy Corbyn and Zarah Sultana founded a new political party, called Your Party. At its founding conference in November 2025, the party adopted a collective leadership model. Prior to that and the party's registration in September 2025, YouGov conducted a poll for voters' preferred Prime Minister, including Corbyn head-to-head with each of four established party leaders.

==== Starmer vs Corbyn ====
Date(s) conducted	Pollster	Sample size	Keir Starmer	Jeremy Corbyn	None	Don't know	Lead
3–4 Aug 2025	YouGov	2,216	27%	22%	7%	44%	5

==== Badenoch vs Corbyn ====
Date(s) conducted	Pollster	Sample size	Kemi Badenoch	Jeremy Corbyn	None	Don't know	Lead
3–4 Aug 2025	YouGov	2,216	24%	27%	7%	44%	3

==== Farage vs Corbyn ====
Date(s) conducted	Pollster	Sample size	Nigel Farage	Jeremy Corbyn	None	Don't know	Lead
3–4 Aug 2025	YouGov	2,216	30%	29%	7%	34%	1

==== Davey vs Corbyn ====
Date(s) conducted	Pollster	Sample size	Ed Davey	Jeremy Corbyn	None	Don't know	Lead
3–4 Aug 2025	YouGov	2,216	25%	20%	8%	47%	5

== See also ==
- Leadership approval opinion polling for the next United Kingdom general election
- Leadership approval opinion polling for the 2024 United Kingdom general election
- Opinion polling for the next United Kingdom general election
