= Zack Polanski =

British politician (born 1982)

Zack Polanski AM
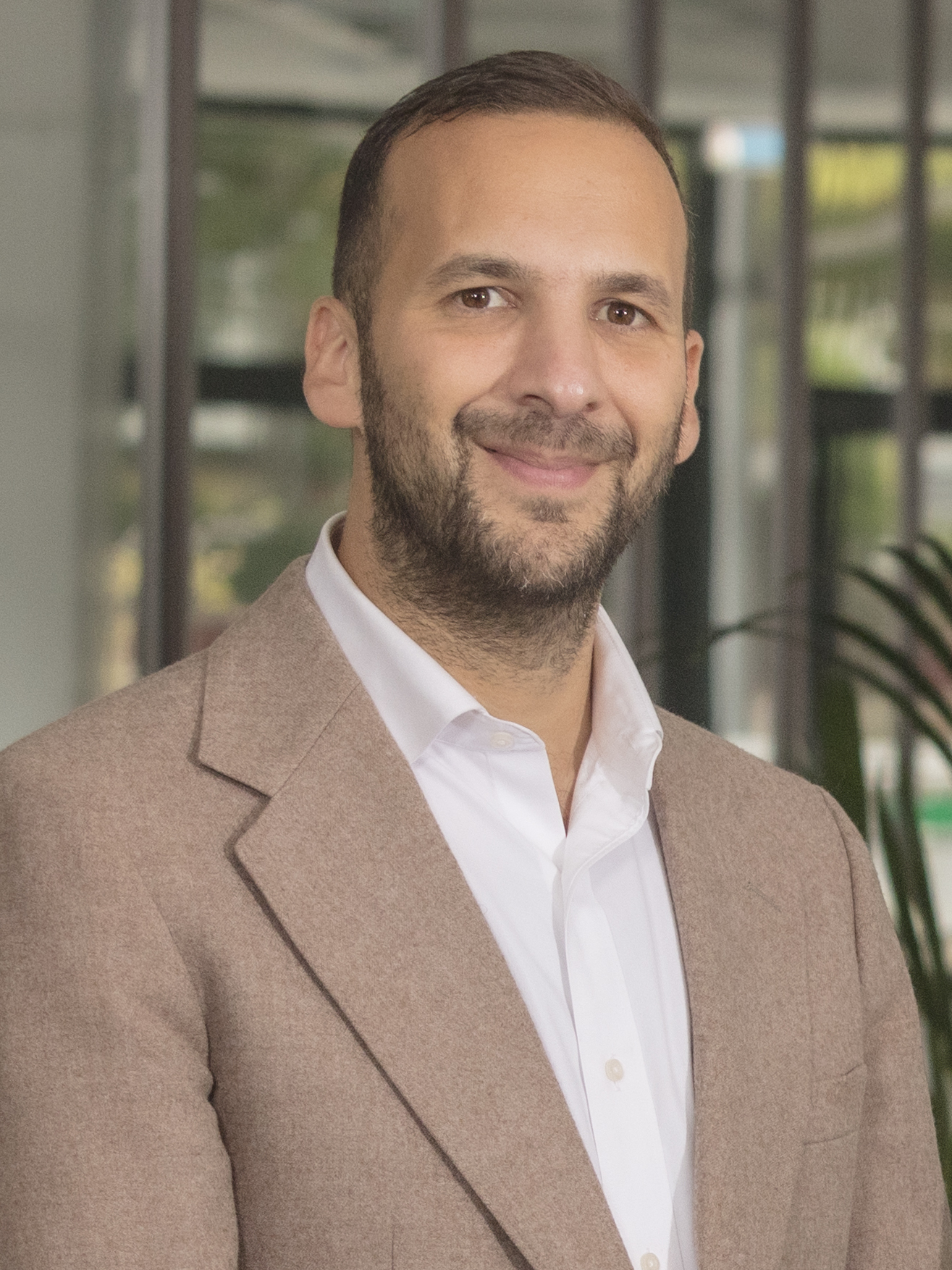
- Polanski in 2022

Leader of the Green Party of England and Wales
- Incumbent
- Assumed office 2 September 2025
- Deputy: Mothin Ali; Rachel Millward
- Preceded by: Adrian Ramsay; Carla Denyer

Deputy Leader of the Green Party of England and Wales
- In office 7 September 2022 – 2 September 2025
- Leader: Adrian Ramsay; Carla Denyer
- Preceded by: Amelia Womack
- Succeeded by: Rachel Millward; Mothin Ali

Member of the London Assembly as an additional member
- Incumbent
- Assumed office 6 May 2021

Personal details
- Born: David Paulden; 2 November 1982 (age 44) Salford, Greater Manchester, England
- Party: Green Party of England and Wales (since 2017)
- Other political affiliations: Liberal Democrats (2015–2017)
- Domestic partner: Richie Bryan (2019–present)
- Education: Aberystwyth University (BA)

Zack Polanski (born David Paulden; 2 November 1982) is a British politician who has been the leader of the Green Party of England and Wales since September 2025 and a member of the London Assembly (AM) since May 2021. He was the deputy leader of the Greens from 2022 to 2025.

Born and raised in Salford, Greater Manchester, Polanski studied sociology and drama at Aberystwyth University from 2003 to 2006 and attended an acting school in Atlanta, Georgia, in the United States. He has worked as an actor, school activity provider and hypnotherapist.

Polanski joined the Liberal Democrats in 2015, and stood unsuccessfully as a candidate for the St Pancras and Somers Town by-election to Camden London Borough Council that year. In the 2016 London Assembly election, he stood for the Barnet and Camden constituency but failed to be elected.

Polanski joined the Greens in 2017, and stood as the Green candidate for the Lancaster Gate by-election to Westminster City Council in November 2018, finishing in last place. In 2019, he stood unsuccessfully for the Cities of London and Westminster parliamentary constituency. In 2021, Polanski was elected a Member of the London Assembly. He also stood for the West Central constituency, and the Churchill by-election to Westminster City Council, losing both elections. In 2022, Polanski was elected deputy leader of the Greens and, in 2024, he was re-elected to the London Assembly.

In 2025, Polanski was elected his party's leader, succeeding the joint leaders Carla Denyer and Adrian Ramsay. In his first year of leadership the Greens made significant gains, including Hannah Spencer's election to Parliament in the 2026 Gorton and Denton by-election, shortly after which the party membership exceeded 220,000—a threefold increase since the start of his term. He led the party into the 2026 local elections, in which the party achieved the best results in their history. Polanski had discussed his intention to run for MP in a seat in North London in the next general election, and was selected as the Green candidate for the 2026 Holborn and St Pancras by-election, following the resignation of Keir Starmer as MP. He lost the by-election to Labour candidate Sagal Abdi-Wali.

Polanski describes his political views as "eco-populist", linking issues such as the high cost of living with climate change, and supporting a tax on the wealthiest in society in an effort to reduce wealth inequality.

== Early life ==
David Paulden was born on 2 November 1982 in Salford, Greater Manchester. His Jewish ancestors immigrated to the UK from Eastern Europe in the early twentieth century. The family adopted the surname Paulden, hoping to avoid antisemitism. At age 18, he changed his name, restoring his familial name of Polanski, later saying it was important for him to take pride in his identity. He also changed his first name, selecting Zack in homage to the Jewish character of the same name from the Michelle Magorian novel Goodnight Mister Tom (1981), and to differentiate himself from his stepfather, also named David, whom Polanski states that he "did not get on with".

Polanski grew up in Salford and Stockport, attending the Jewish King David High School, and later Stockport Grammar School on a scholarship before moving to Ridge Danyers College. His parents divorced when he was 11. He has said that he was bullied at school as a teenager for being Jewish and gay. During his teens, he was connected with the Labour Zionist youth-movement Habonim Dror. He studied sociology and drama at Aberystwyth University from 2003 to 2006 and later attended an acting school in Atlanta, Georgia. He moved to London in the mid-2000s after graduation.

== Early career ==
Polanski worked with the theatre company DifferencENGINE as an immersive theatre actor, including appearances in The Hollow Hotel and The People's Revolt (in the Tower of London). During his twenties, while working as an actor, he "worked in nightclubs and as a waiter, a charity fundraiser and promotional marketeer", and around 2012 his work also included providing wellbeing counselling to acting students. He taught at the Academy of Live and Recorded Arts and the National Centre for Circus Arts.

Polanski also worked as a hypnotherapist at a clinic on Harley Street. In 2013, a journalist for The Sun requested a hypnotherapy session from him to increase her breast size and body image self-confidence for an article in the paper. Polanski featured in the published article, in which the journalist claimed that her breast size had increased. Later, when Polanski was deputy leader of the Greens, he apologised for his involvement in the article, saying that the idea came from the client, that he did not charge for the session, and that he had spoken to the BBC the day after the release article to apologise. The BBC was unable to produce such an interview, but did produce another interview, conducted six days after the release of the Sun article, in which Polanski defended the claims, telling the radio station that there was "starting to become anecdotal evidence, at least, of a growth in breast size". Polanski has continued to apologise for the incident, saying that the therapy was meant to help with bodily self-image rather than physical enlargement, and that the article did not accurately reflect the situation.

In 2022, Polanski said he was a "spokesperson" for the British Red Cross on crowdfunding pages for his campaign for the Deputy Leadership of the Green Party. In 2026, the British Red Cross said he had not been a spokesperson for them. Polanski said that he had hosted fundraisers for the organisation, and that he had used the wrong word. Campaigning to be the Green candidate for Mayor of London in 2019, Polanski said he had been a spokesperson for the campaign group Axe the Housing Act. When asked in 2026, his representative told the Financial Times that he had spoken at Axe the Housing Act events and had not been a spokesperson.

Polanski has stated that he was not interested in politics until he reached his 30s, and was politicised by his time in theatre: he worked in a school of drama known as the "Theatre of the Oppressed", which involved meeting people who had suffered injustice, and then playing them on stage.

== Political career ==
=== 2011 AV Referendum ===
Polanski appeared in a YES! To Fairer Votes election broadcast. The actors in the video were all activists for the campaign.

=== Liberal Democrats ===
Polanski was active in the Liberal Democrats, which he joined in 2015. He stood as a Liberal Democrat council candidate for St Pancras and Somers Town in a 2015 by-election to Camden London Borough Council, he won 96 votes and lost to Paul Edward Tomlinson of the Labour Party. He stood in the Barnet and Camden constituency and was fifth on the London-wide list for the party in the 2016 London Assembly election. In June 2016, he heckled Jeremy Corbyn at a Momentum rally, criticising him for being insufficiently supportive of the European Union.

Polanski has stated that he joined the Liberal Democrats principally because they were famous for their policy of changing the first-past-the-post voting system to proportional representation, which he had come to believe was stopping people from getting the political outcomes they wanted. He only later realised that the Green Party had the same policy. A 2015 article from the Liberal Democrat Voice describes him as being "ambitious, but with a true liberal soul".

In discussing his interest in the 2015 Lib Dem leadership contest, Polanski said: "I want a leader who is proud of our Government record, who doesn't have blinkers about where we failed to communicate effectively with the electorate whilst still being immensely proud of what Nick and our colleagues achieved in office."

Polanski put his name forward in the Richmond Park by-election held in December 2016 but the selection list was restricted to local residents. On Lib Dem Voice, it was announced in October 2016 that Sarah Olney was to be the candidate for Richmond Park to which Polanski commented about being blocked stating that there were eight candidates but only one was shortlisted. He was dismayed at the decision and requested it be reviewed, feeling that the party was not interested in what he could contribute as a gay Jewish renter.

According to Private Eye, Polanski had courted both the left, alongside the centre-left Social Liberal Forum associate of the party as well as the dominant Conservative-Lib Dem coalition governing faction, and the centrist Liberal Reform associate group, which stood in contrast as the right of the party.

=== Joining the Green Party ===
Polanski left the Liberal Democrats and joined the Green Party in 2017 after interacting with former leader Natalie Bennett. He told Left Foot Forward in 2019 that he joined the Green Party as he was unhappy with the Lib Dems support for air strikes in Syria, and that he thought the Green Party had been a positive force in London.

In 2018, when Jeremy Corbyn was the leader of the Labour Party, Polanski tweeted that as "a pro-European Jew" he had "two reasons [he] couldn't vote for Labour under Jeremy Corbyn". He has since said that he regrets this remark and has apologised privately to Corbyn. He stated in 2026 that he was "lost in the propaganda" and now believes that accusations of antisemitism were weaponised to damage Corbyn. He has also stated that he would have backed Corbyn if he "knew what [he] knew now".

In November 2018, he was the Green candidate for the Lancaster Gate by-election to Westminster City Council. He stood as the Green candidate in the Cities of London and Westminster parliamentary constituency at the 2019 general election and finished in fourth place of six candidates, with 1.7%. Before his election to the London Assembly, he became treasurer of the Jewish Greens. In 2018, Polanski wrote on Twitter about an alleged conversation that he overheard in a restaurant, involving the then chief secretary to the Treasury, Liz Truss. According to Polanski, Truss criticised several of her colleagues, saying "this is a public conversation of a very senior figure who says one thing on TV and clearly believes differently". He took part in Extinction Rebellion protests and was arrested at a protest in April 2019.

==== Member of the London Assembly ====
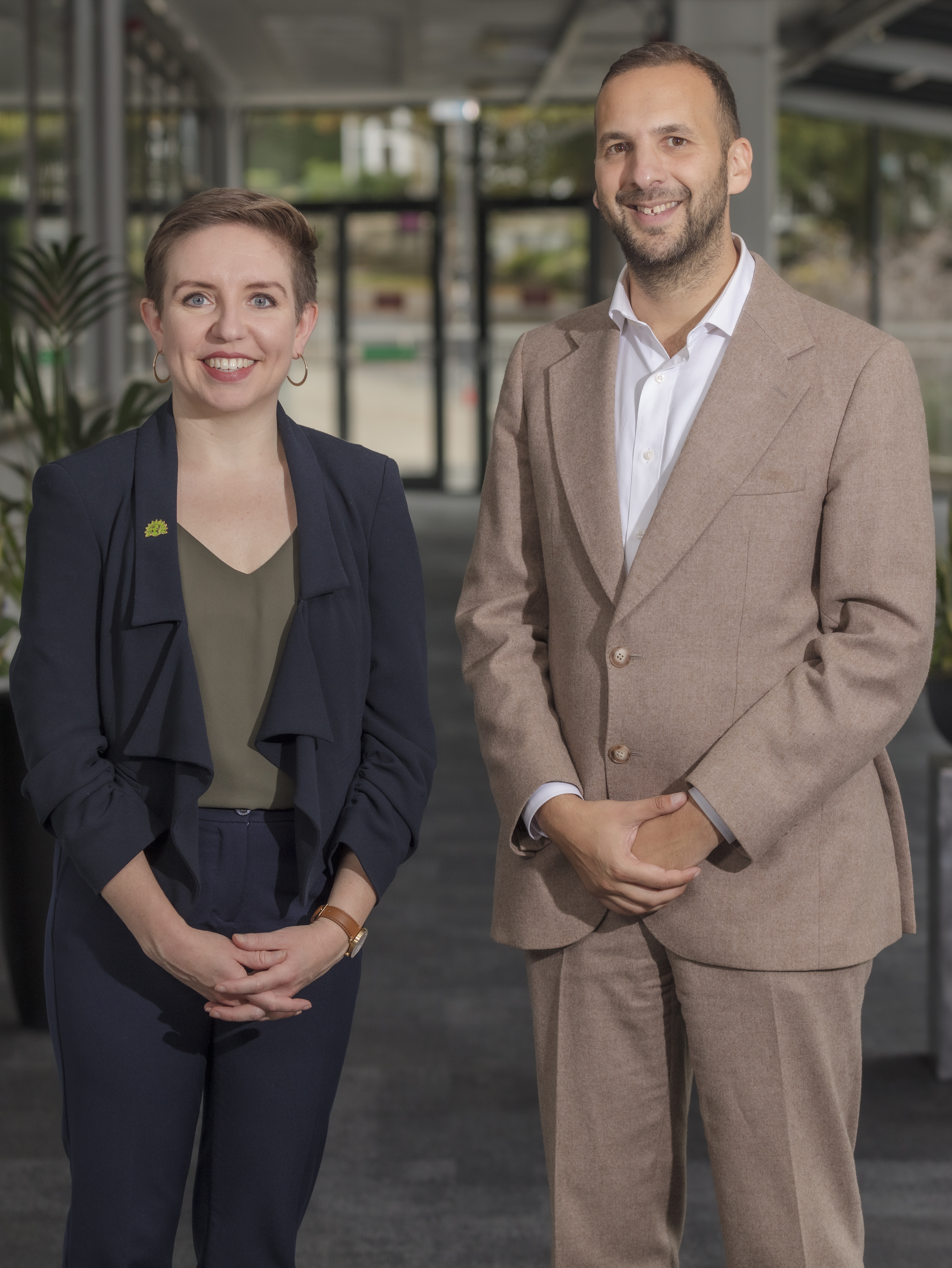
Polanski with then party co-leader Carla Denyer in 2022

On 6 May 2021, Polanski was elected a Member of the London Assembly, having been third on the Green Party's London-wide list. He also stood in the West Central constituency, where he came third, and for the Churchill by-election to Westminster City Council, where he came fourth on the same day. In the new Assembly, Polanski was elected to be the chair of the Environment committee and to be on the Committee for Fire, Resilience and Emergency Planning and the Economy Committee.

In December 2021, Polanski proposed a successful motion in the London Assembly backing the Climate and Ecological Emergency Bill. It was a cross-party motion with Labour and Liberal Democrat support. In 2021, he was also the Green Party's national spokesperson for democracy and citizen engagement.

==== Deputy Leader of the Green Party ====
On 6 June 2022, Polanski announced his candidacy in the 2022 Green Party of England and Wales deputy leadership election. The Wales Green Party gave their endorsement of his candidacy for deputy leader. On 7 September 2022, he was elected Deputy Leader, succeeding Amelia Womack.

Polanski linked the cost-of-living crisis and the climate crisis, putting workers' rights at the heart of his platform. Polanski stated, "A higher wage economy is a green economy, and the Green party will always stand side by side with people who face economic, social and environmental struggles."

In May 2024, Polanski was re-elected to the London Assembly and, in June 2024, re-elected as Chair of the London Assembly Environment Committee. During the 2024 general election campaign, The Guardian praised Polanski for being a "fluent media performer". In January 2025, Polanski refused to have an all-male panel in London's Environment Committee and insisted on a diversity of speakers. The Conservatives walked out of the meeting, calling Polanski's actions "left-wing wokery".

In May 2025, Polanski announced his candidacy for the 2025 Green Party of England and Wales leadership election. In his announcement, he said that the Greens needed to be able to challenge Reform UK's political narrative and to take advantage of political disillusionment with the Labour Party. Later that week, Owen Jones endorsed Polanski in The Guardian. Senior members of the Green Party, including Caroline Lucas, endorsed Polanski's opponents. Polanski has stated that, under his leadership, the party will focus on "redistributing wealth, funding public services, and calling out the genocide in Gaza". Polanski repeatedly linked environmental, social, racial and economic justice.

=== Leader of the Green Party ===
Number of registered members of the Green Party, showing the spike in membership after Polanski was elected

On 2 September 2025, Polanski was elected as leader of the Green Party in a landslide, with 85% of the vote, succeeding Carla Denyer and Adrian Ramsay in that position and beating a rival bid from MPs Ramsay and Ellie Chowns. The Green Party saw its membership rise by at least 8% from May to July 2025, when Polanski launched his leadership bid, in what some have described as a "Polanski surge". Novara Media reported that the party had at least 65,000 members, slightly behind its peak of 67,000 in 2015. The party confirmed its membership figures to be 68,500 following the announcement of leadership election results. Membership rose to over 75,000 by 19 September, following the emergence of in-fighting within the recently announced Your Party and to 100,000 by 12 October, putting it above the Liberal Democrats. On 19 October, the party announced that their membership numbers had overtaken those of the Conservative Party.

In his first speech as leader, Polanski said the Green Party aims to replace the Labour Party, and expressed enthusiasm for working with others who were critical both of the Labour Party and fascism. Polanski also said he could not imagine supporting a coalition government led by Keir Starmer. He has said his top priority is the Wales Green Party winning its first member of the Senedd in the 2026 Senedd election. In his first days as leader, he released the first episode of his weekly podcast Bold Politics with Zack Polanski, which reached fourth place in the UK news podcast charts by 8 September, and visited Nigel Farage's parliamentary seat in Clacton to speak to the Reform UK seat's constituents.

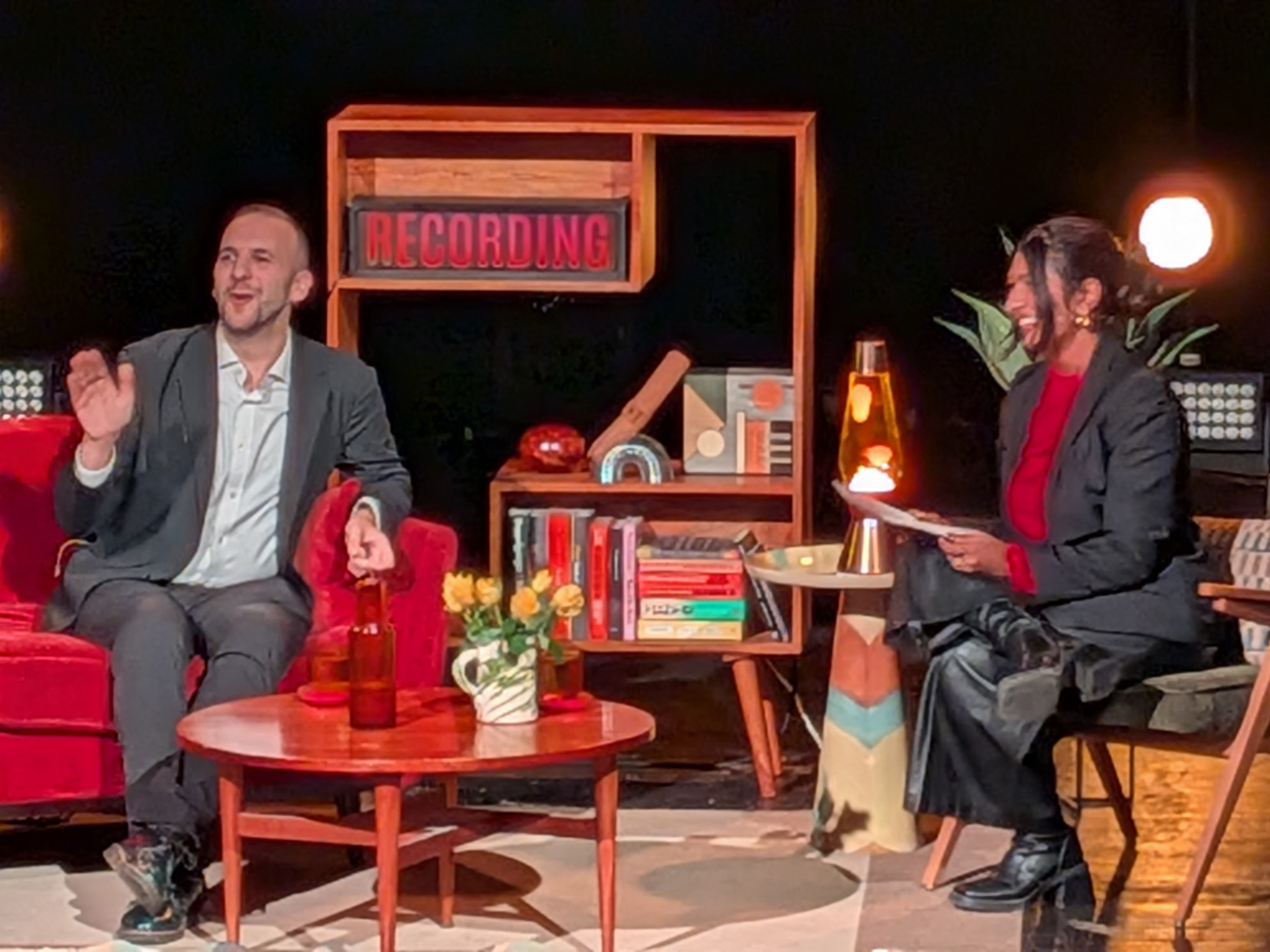
Polanski (left) with Ash Sarkar at EartH theatre in 2025

On 30 September, Polanski was listed in Time Magazine's 2025 100 Next: the world's 100 most influential rising stars. On 3 October, he addressed his first annual party conference in Bournemouth, in which he called for a wealth tax on the wealthiest in Britain, an end to the sale of arms to Israel, and criticised other parties for attacking civil liberties and immigrants. In a subsequent interview with the Byline Times, he stated his intention to run for parliament in the next general election.

In December, Polanski visited Calais, where he witnessed the French police slashing tents, and seizing firewood from sheltering migrants. He then released an alternative Christmas message on 25 December at the same time as the King's broadcast, declaring the current migration system "cruel", encouraging greater empathy towards migrants, and suggesting that it be replaced with a more humane system.

==== Gorton and Denton by-election ====
On 27 January, Polanski formally launched the Green Party campaign for the 2026 Gorton and Denton by-election, his first by-election as party leader, at an event in which he framed the Green campaign to the economic left of Labour and denied that the Greens would split the progressive vote, citing the government's proposed cuts to disability benefits to suggest that Labour is no longer a "left-wing party". The war in Gaza was also mentioned at the event. The Green Party described the by-election as a "Reform–Green battle", and began canvassing in the seat on 25 January. The Green candidate, Hannah Spencer, stated that she would seek Starmer's resignation if she won the race. The Green Party aimed to attract left-leaning voters disgruntled by Labour's handling of the Gaza war, in particular from the constituency's Muslim population. Spencer won the by-election with a majority of 4,402 votes, defeating both Reform UK and the Labour Party to become the Green Party's fifth MP and first in the North of England. This was also the first ever parliamentary by-election win for the Greens, and was described as a significant blow to the Prime Minister, Keir Starmer. A few days after the by-election, the Green Party announced having passed 200,000 members, a threefold increase from the 68,000 figure at the start of Polanski's leadership.

In February 2026, Polanski said that he wants to stand at the next general election in a constituency near his home in North London, and told The Times that he would consider running in Hackney (which includes Hackney North & Stoke Newington and Hackney South & Shoreditch), Walthamstow, or Tottenham, although he later stated he would not stand against Hackney North MP Diane Abbott.

==== 2026 local and Senedd elections campaign ====
On 31 March, Polanski and Anthony Slaughter launched the Wales Green Party's campaign for the 2026 Senedd election.

In response to a series of antisemitic attacks in London in March and April, Polanski stated he was concerned about rising antisemitism, while also questioning the scale of problem, saying "there's a conversation to be had about whether it's a perception of unsafety or whether it's actual unsafety, but neither are acceptable". After an attack in Golders Green, Polanski retweeted criticism of police use of force while apprehending the assailant. Polanski's commentary received some support on social media, but was criticised by the Commissioner of the Metropolitan Police, Mark Rowley, and by the Prime Minister. Polanski later apologised, saying social media had been an inappropriate forum to raise concerns.

In May, Polanski criticised The Times for publishing a caricature of him with a hooked nose, describing it as antisemitic. He also said that two people had been arrested for antisemitic incidents against him.

In the 2026 local elections, the Greens won 587 council seats, an increase of 441 and the single largest increase in councillors the party has ever had. This election saw the party take control of several councils in London, as well as Norwich and Hastings, and also winning its first mayoralties in Hackney and Lewisham. At the 2026 Senedd election, held on the same day, the Welsh Green Party secured its first two members of the Senedd. Following this, the BBC projected that their equivalent national vote share would have been 18%.

After allegations of antisemitism involving some Green Party candidates prior to the elections emerged, Polanski condemned antisemitism and announced stronger vetting procedures and compulsory antisemitism training, while also saying that criticism of Israel was sometimes wrongly labelled antisemitic.

==== Holborn and St Pancras by-election ====
On 3 September 2026, Polanski declared that he intended to stand in the Holborn and St Pancras by-election after former Prime Minister Sir Keir Starmer resigned his parliamentary seat. On 11 September, he was officially announced as the Green Party candidate. He released campaign videos in Urdu, French and Bengali. He lost the by-election to Labour candidate Sagal Abdi-Wali.

== Political views ==
=== Domestic affairs ===
Polanski has labelled his political views as eco-populist, combining environmental politics and populism. Additionally, Politico Europe and the New Statesman have described his approach to leading the Green Party as representing a populist left form of politics. Polanski argues that people are unable to consider the climate crisis if they are struggling with day-to-day material concerns such as high rent burden, and high costs of food or heating. In addition to green politics, Polanski has advocated for increasing taxes on billionaires, renationalising water companies, challenging lack of government subsidy on net-zero policies, and increasing regulations on private corporations. He has also supported the introduction of a wealth tax on the wealthiest, believing that tax on wealth is fairer than one focused on work-based income and that it would reduce inequality. Polanski has also voiced support for Modern Monetary Theory, with him calling three lead proponents of the theory, Richard Murphy, Grace Blakeley, and Gary Stevenson, his 'three favourite economists'.

Polanski supports replacing the first-past-the-post electoral system in the UK with a proportional representation system, and the abolition of the House of Lords. He has also campaigned against the role of Palantir in keeping data for the National Health Service (NHS), saying that Palantir "has absolutely no place in the NHS". Polanski has described the For Women Scotland v The Scottish Ministers ruling and subsequent EHRC guidance changes as "thinly veiled transphobia".

In April 2026, Polanski said he would back Scottish independence if he were Scottish, stating that Scotland had been "screwed over by Westminster governments". He has also spoken in favour of Welsh independence.

Polanski believes that criticism of the Israeli government and the Gaza genocide have been deliberately conflated with and weaponised as being antisemitic in the press, while also describing antisemitism as a genuine issue. He has also stated his aim to make sure that the Greens "push back against false allegations of anti-Semitism, but also make sure that actual anti-Semitism is also being dealt with".

Polanski has spoken in favour of abolishing the monarchy, stating his belief that "the monarchy is a clear symbol of the inequality that exists in our society", although he has said that its abolition would not be a priority.

Polanski has advocated for the legalisation and regulation of recreational drug use, arguing that a "public health approach" to drug use would prevent deaths. He has described the war on drugs as "not working" and making drugs more dangerous.

Polanski has called mass privatisation of UK industry a "failed experiment", stating that it has been "one of the key drivers of the cost-of-living crisis and growing inequality".

=== Foreign affairs ===
Polanski is critical of the UK's relationship with the United States and NATO, and advocates the UK's eventual withdrawal from NATO. Polanski has said he believes that the UK's membership of NATO was untenable in the long-term, in part due to Donald Trump's threats to annex Greenland, as well as NATO prioritising militarism before diplomacy. Polanski has suggested that establishing organisations that prioritise European defence, democracy, diplomacy and international peace would allow the UK to eventually leave NATO. Polanski is opposed to the US-Israel war on Iran, describing it as an illegal war and advocating against the UK's involvement in it. In response to the war, Polanski said that the UK needed to prohibit American access to British bases and decouple from the United States, describing it as a rogue state that threatened genocide against Iranians, and argued for building a stronger security arrangement with other European countries instead.

Polanski considers the UK government to be active participants in the Gaza genocide. He states that the British government conflates Jewish people with Israel, and that this "makes [him] feel less safe as a Jewish person". Polanski has said that he was raised Zionist but changed his stance when he was older, partly influenced by talking to a group of Israeli veterans who are members of Breaking the Silence. During the 2026 Israeli invasion of Lebanon, Polanski said that Israel should be sanctioned for its actions.

In October 2026, after the "Zionism is Racism" motion was adopted by members at the Green Party Conference, Israel's foreign ministry banned Polanski from entering Israel. Polanski had not taken part in the vote. He said it was racist for Zionism to displace Palestinians. He wanted the reference to a one-state solution removed from the motion since he believed it was not appropriate for the Greens to decide on the form of a settlement.

== YouTube channel ==
Zack Polanski

YouTube information
- Channel: Bold Politics with Zack Polanski
- Years active: 2025–present
- Subscribers: 59.8k
- Views: 5.7 million
- Last updated: 11 November 2026

Since 2025 Polanski has run a YouTube channel, Bold Politics with Zack Polanski which as of November 2026 had 59,800 subscribers and 5.7 million views.

== Personal life ==
Polanski is Jewish, gay, and vegan. He has been in a relationship with palliative care worker Richie Bryan since 2019.

In May 2026, Polanski admitted that he may not have paid the correct amount of council tax while the couple lived on a houseboat in Waltham Forest. LBC and The Times reported that Polanski was staying in Hackney at the time. A spokesperson for The Green Party described the situation as an "unintentional mistake" and said Polanski had "immediately taken steps" to pay any tax owed. The Greater London Authority ruled that Polanski's living arrangements were not within their scope and cleared him of having breached the London Assembly's code of conduct. Waltham Forest are investigating whether any additional council tax is owed.

Polanski has also discussed his abstention from alcohol and other drugs. He enjoys theatre, supports the Forest Green Rovers football team, and has sung in the London International Gospel Choir.

== Filmography ==
Polanski was an actor in his youth before going into politics.

Year	Title	Role	Notes	Ref.
2007	Art of Suicide	Joel Mallon	Actor	
2008	Seven Crosses	Ash	Actor	
2010	The Gallon Challenge	Travis Carter	Lead Role	
2011	Bashment	Eggy's Cellmate	Extra	

== See also ==
- London Green Party
- List of Green Party of England and Wales politicians
- List of people from the City of Salford

Party political offices
Preceded by Carla Denyer and Adrian Ramsay	Leader of the Green Party of England and Wales; 2025–present	Incumbent
Preceded by Amelia Womack	Deputy Leader of the Green Party of England and Wales; 2022–2025	Succeeded by Mothin Ali and Rachel Millward
