= 2022 Green Party of England and Wales deputy leadership election =

Green Party of England and Wales Party deputy leadership election

- 1 July – 7 September 2022
- Turnout: 6,266 (12.5%)
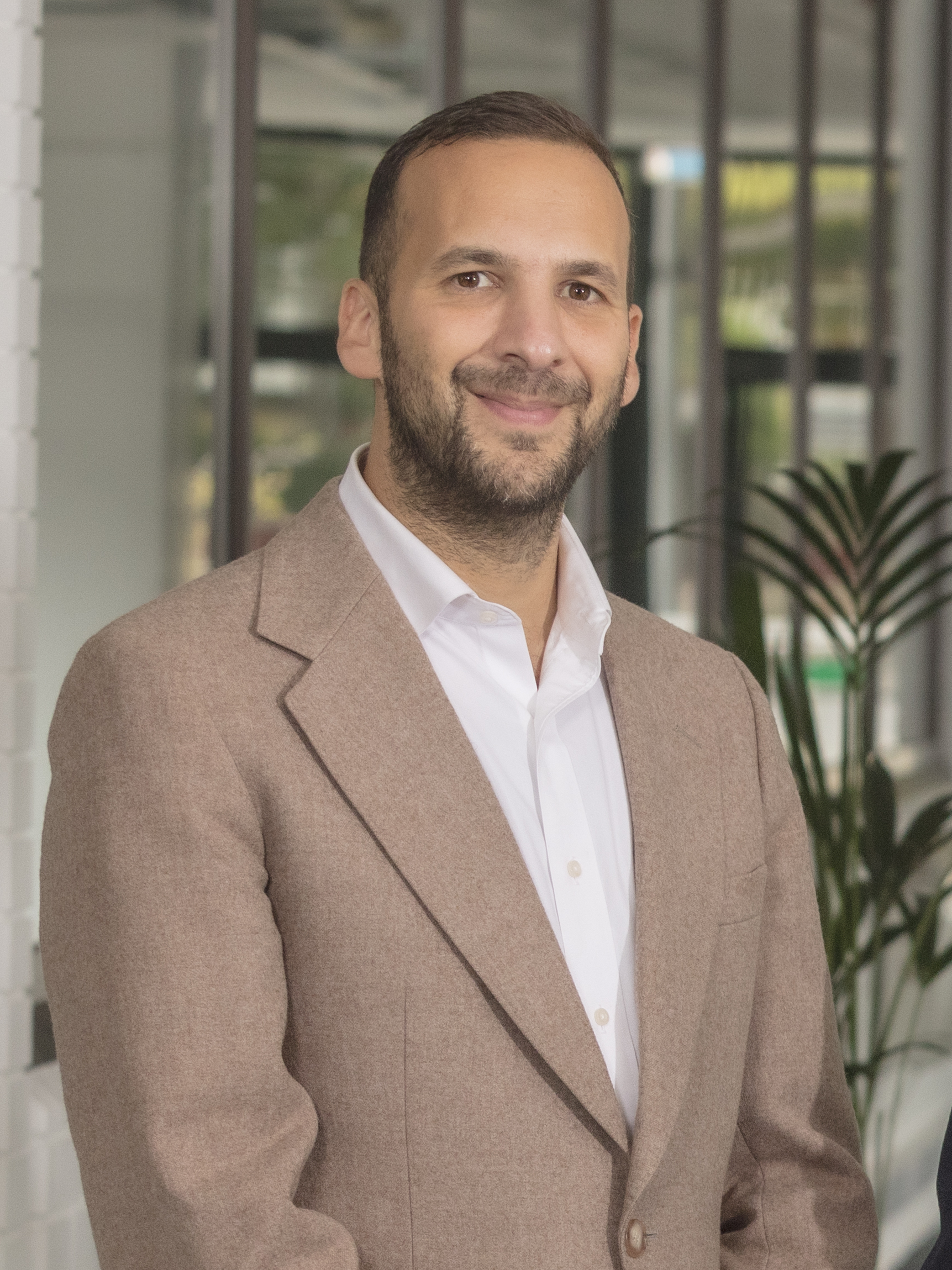

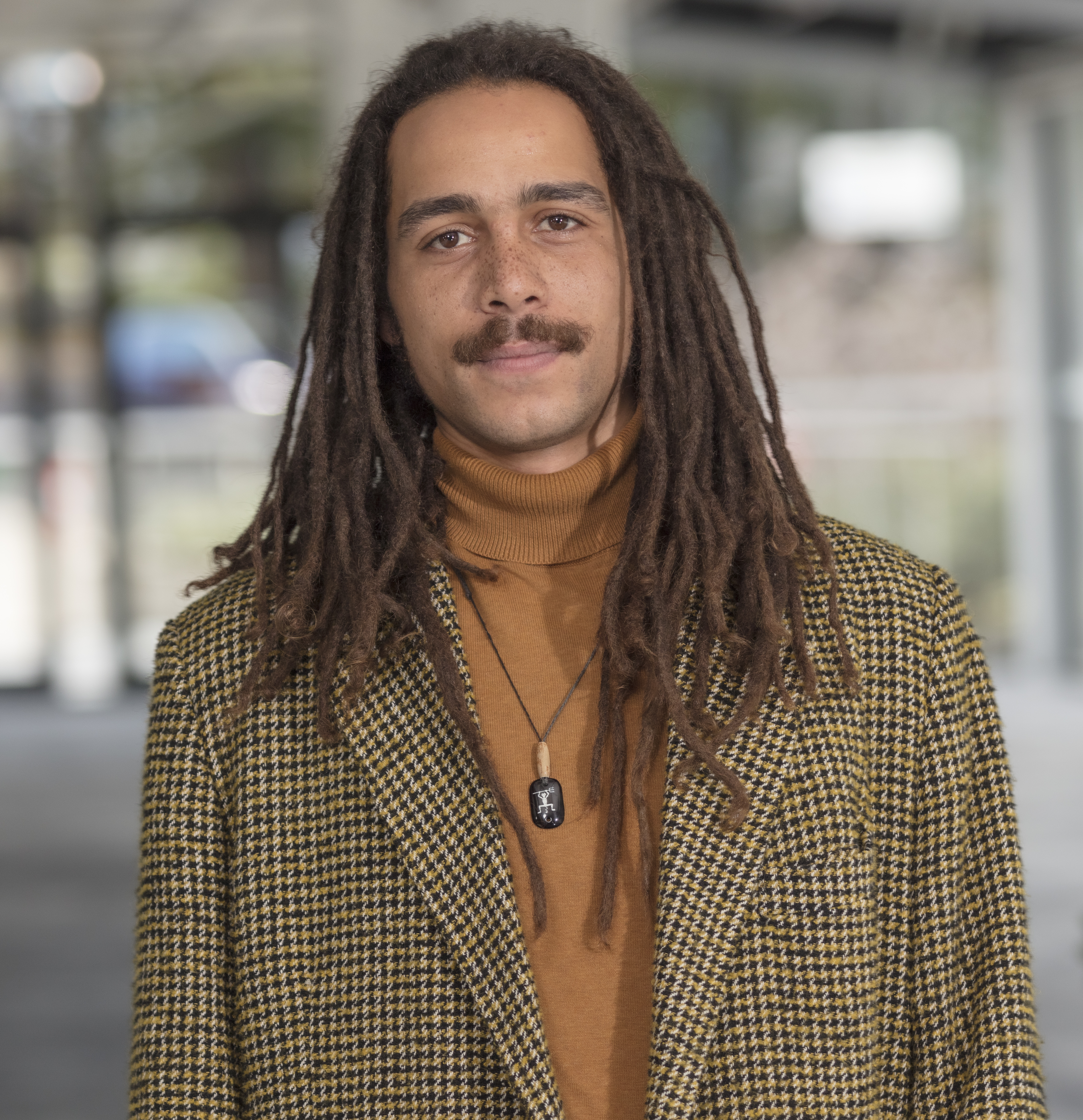

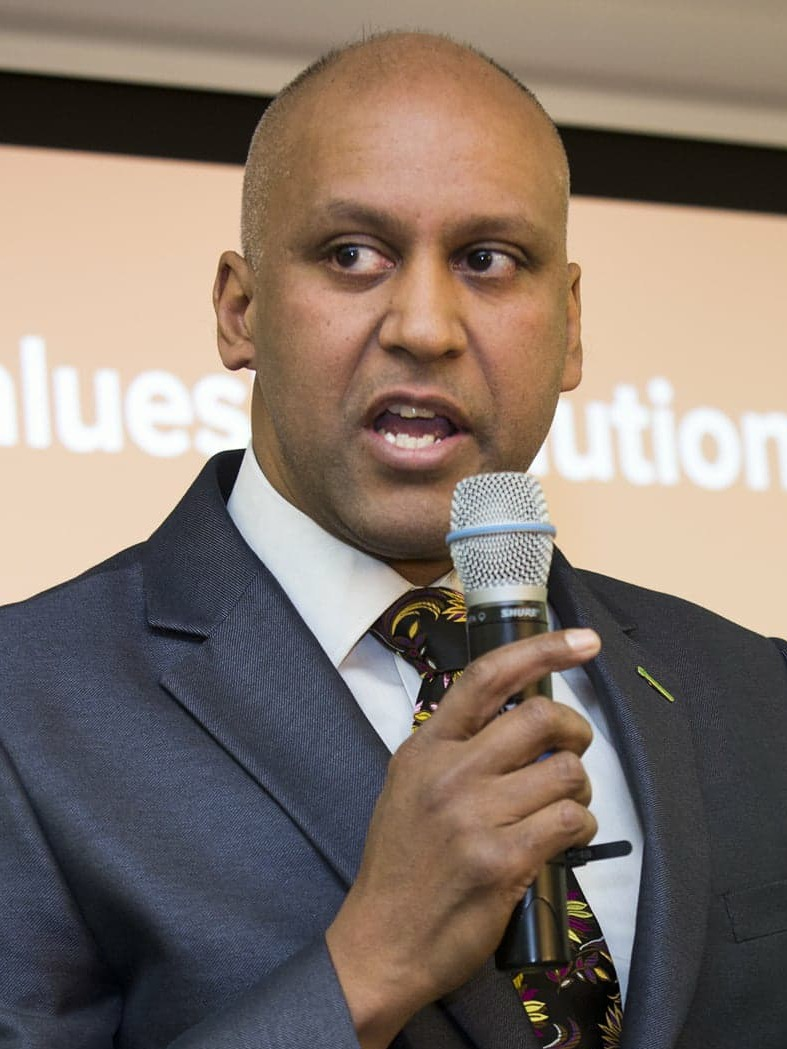

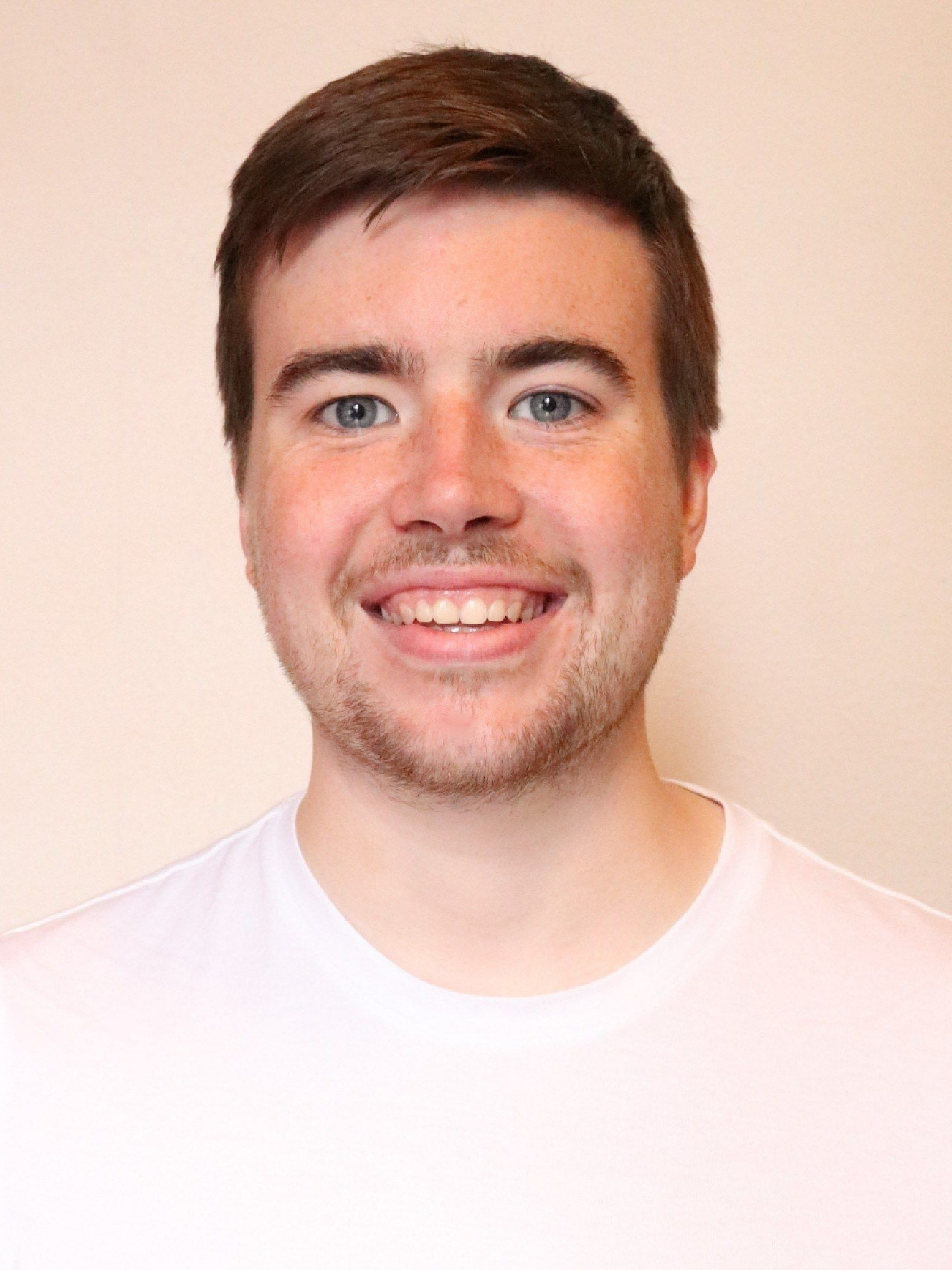
Candidate	Zack Polanski	Tyrone Scott
First pref.	42%	28%
Final round	51%	42%
Candidate	Shahrar Ali	Nick Humberstone
First pref.	24%	6%
Final round	Eliminated	Eliminated
Deputy leader before election
Amelia Womack
Elected deputy leader
Zack Polanski

The 2022 Green Party of England and Wales Party deputy leadership election throughout the summer of 2022 to determine the next deputy leader of the Green Party of England and Wales. Zack Polanski won the election received over 50% of the final vote.

== Background ==
On 5 March 2022, the party's then deputy leader, Amelia Womack, announced she would not be seeking re-elected in the party's 2022 deputy leadership election. She had been the party's deputy leader for eight years, having first been elected to the role in 2014, and subsequently re-elected three times since (in 2016, 2018 and 2020).

The first to announce their candidacy was London Assembly member Zack Polanski, followed by Tyrone Scott, who announced his candidacy during Glastonbury Festival, and former Deputy leader Shahrar Ali. Nick Humberstone was the final to announce his campaign. Transgender activist and former party chairwoman Kathryn Bristow considered a run but ultimately decided against it citing health and transphobia within the Green Party.

In an interview with Bright Green, Humberstone stated that if elected he would have a "bold" and "ambitious" leadership style.

== Results ==
The results were announced on 7 September 2022. In the first round no candidate received 50% or more of the vote. Zack Polanski placed highest with 42% of the vote in the first round, followed by Tyrone Scott with 28%, while Shahrar Ali received 24% and Nick Humberstone, 6%. Zack Polanski was elected for the role after several rounds of counting second and third preferences with 51% of the vote.

Turnout was low, with 6,266 of more than 50,000 members eligible to vote casting votes (12.5%).

== See also ==
- 2021 Green Party of England and Wales leadership election
- 2020 Green Party of England and Wales leadership election
