= Millionaires for Humanity =

Campaign organisation

- Website: millionairesforhumanity.org

Millionaires for Humanity (MFH) is an international organisation of wealthy people who campaign for a wealth tax which is a part of Human Act, an independent foundation based in Copenhagen, Denmark and founded by Djaffar Shalchi. It is supported by a number of organisations, including Oxfam, Patriotic Millionaires and Tax Justice UK. Notable signatories include Abigail Disney, Jerry Greenfield, Richard Curtis and Gary Stevenson.

== History ==
Many of the members of Millionaires for Humanity had signed an open letter to the World Economic Forum in January 2020, under the name Millionaires Against Pitchforks, arguing that if a higher wealth tax were not instituted, people would revolt to take the money off them.

In July 2020 MFH signed a letter asking their governments to make the wealthy pay more tax, stating that "as Covid-19 strikes, millionaires like us have a crucial role to play in healing the world", and that issues of inequalty in the world cannot be solved through charity "no matter how generous".

MFH endorsed an open letter named "The Cost of Extreme Wealth" by Patriotic Millionaires in January 2023, which called on the WEF to "tax the ultra rich and do it now".

In September 2023, MFH worked with Patriotic Millionaires, the Institute for Policy Studies, Earth4All and Oxfam to pen another open letter to the G20 before its 2023 G20 New Delhi summit. The letter argued that urgent action would be needed to prevent extreme wealth "corroding our collective future" and that a wealth tax would decrease "dangerous levels of inequality." In 2024, it joined Patriotic Millionaires, TaxMeNow and Oxfam in forming a coalition called Proud to Pay More; this coalition sent a letter to global leaders during the World Economic Forum. It said that "We all know that 'trickle down economics' has not translated into reality. Instead it has given us stagnating wages, crumbling infrastructure, failing public services, and destabilized the very institution of democracy.” It finished by asking its recipients "to take this necessary and inevitable step before it’s too late. Make your countries proud. Tax extreme wealth."
