= Internetworld =

Swedish magazine

Internetworld was a Swedish magazine focusing on the Internet and business surrounding it.

== History and profile ==
Internetworld was started in 1996. The magazine was owned and published by IDG.

In 1997, Internetworld started an annual ranking of Sweden's 100 best websites, the Topp100. In 2005, it arranged the first Webbdagarna conference. Internetworld ceased publication in 2013, but IDG Sweden has kept the annual Topp100 ranking and Webbdagarna conferences.
