= Gary Stevenson (campaigner) =

British YouTuber (born 1986)

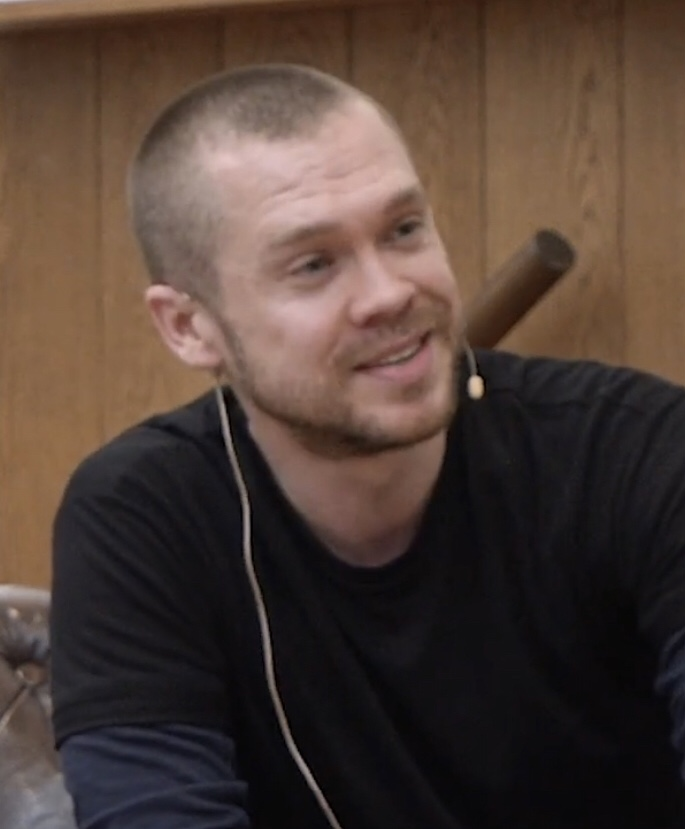
- Stevenson in 2024
- Born: Gary Walter Stevenson; 1986 (age 39–40); Ilford, London, England
- Education: London School of Economics (BSc); Keble College, Oxford (MPhil)
- Years active: 2008–present
- Known for: Economic activism

YouTube information
- Channel: Garys Economics
- Years active: 2020–present
- Subscribers: 1.66 million
- Views: 249.2 million
- Last updated: 11 October 2026
- Website: garyseconomics.org

Gary Walter Stevenson (born 1986) is a British YouTuber, author, and former financial trader known for his economic commentary and activism against economic inequality.

Born in Ilford, London, Stevenson studied economics and mathematics at the London School of Economics, before becoming a financial trader at Citibank in 2008 at age 21. Stevenson became a millionaire at Citibank, where he claims to have been the most profitable trader globally in 2011. This has been disputed by former colleagues.

In 2014, Stevenson retired from financial trading to study for an MPhil in economics at the University of Oxford. In 2020, he started the YouTube-channel GarysEconomics, where he campaigns against economic inequality and explains economic concepts to a wider audience.

Stevenson is a contributor to policy debates on inequality in Britain, including The Guardian, BBC, LBC, Novara Media, and Piers Morgan Uncensored. In 2024, Penguin Books published The Trading Game, Stevenson's memoir about his years working in the finance industry.

== Early life and education ==
Stevenson was born to Mormon parents, and grew up in a low-income household in Ilford, London. His English father was a post office worker in Ilford and his mother is of Italian heritage. He was the middle child of three siblings. As a child, Stevenson worked as a paperboy, and attended Ilford County High School until 2003 when he was expelled at age 16 due to a "drug-related transgression". He then completed his A-Levels at Valentines High School, where he achieved four A grades. As a teenager, he spent a brief time as a grime MC. He worked for DFS, earning £40 a day.

His academic achievement earned him a scholarship to the London School of Economics (LSE), where he enrolled in 2005 to study mathematics and economics. Here he completed a BSc degree in economics in 2008. In 2017, he began postgraduate study at Keble College, Oxford, earning an MPhil in economics from the University of Oxford in 2019. He later wrote in his memoir that his university experience led him to conclude that "a lot of rich people expect poor people to be stupid".

== Career ==
=== Interest rate trader ===
Stevenson began his career as an interest rate trader in 2008 at age 21 after winning a card game based on trading, initially being hired by Citibank as an intern and then as a full employee. He took advantage of the 2008 financial crisis, receiving his first bonus in early 2009 of £13,000, and earned just under £400,000 in his first year, followed by his first million pounds by 2010. He also bet on the Greek government-debt crisis in 2011.

Stevenson has since said that he became "Citibank's most profitable trader, in the whole world" in 2011 with a peak $35 million profit achieved for the bank that year. Stevenson states that he generated this profit by trading based on the prediction that interest rates would not rise due to the impact of wealth inequality upon demand. He believed the wealthy tended to save their money rather than spend it, instead investing it in property. However, his "most profitable trader" claim was disputed by eight of his former Citibank colleagues in a 2024 Financial Times article. Former colleagues stated that Stevenson could not have known his global ranking because Citibank did not maintain an official record of trader profitability. Stevenson has responded to the article by stating that "I stand by what I've said in the book, I have nothing further to add."

After becoming disillusioned with his life at the time, Stevenson was moved by Citibank to a job in Tokyo. While there he has said he attempted to leave Citibank through a "charity clause" in which he would work for a charitable organisation for a year, but was denied this. One of his colleagues has stated that the "charity clause" was "essentially gone" by the time Stevenson tried to use it. Stevenson then states that he was signed off work for six months by a doctor, which was followed by work in an administrative job at the bank for a year, before he was allowed to leave the bank with his deferred stock of around £1.5 million to £2 million. Stevenson retired from trading in 2014 when he was 27, after burning out.

=== Campaigning ===
Stevenson enrolled at Keble College, Oxford to study for a Master of Philosophy in economics, writing a thesis titled "The Impact of Inequality on Asset Prices When Households Care About Wealth". "Depressed and disillusioned" with the education he was receiving, and annoyed that "change isn't going to come from there," he read the work of Thomas Piketty, Emmanuel Saez, Gabriel Zucman, Atif Mian, Amir Sufi, and Ludwig Straub.

When the COVID-19 pandemic began, he predicted a rise in house prices and in the cost of shopping, and that inequality would increase. He joined the Patriotic Millionaires and Millionaires for Humanity to campaign for wealth tax, and set up the YouTube channel GarysEconomics with the mission of explaining economics to the wider public. In 2021, he signed an open letter to Rishi Sunak alongside 29 other UK millionaires, calling on the then chancellor to introduce a wealth tax and stating that "instead of raising national insurance and taking £1,000 a year away from families on universal credit, the chancellor, who is a multimillionaire, should be taxing himself and people like me – people with wealth." He has also proposed limiting the length of time for which people can keep their wealth. He has said that he does not want wealth taxes for people with £1 million, but for those with family offices and over £10 million.

In 2022, Stevenson appeared in the Channel 4 documentary Cryptocurrency: Has the Bubble Burst? In 2023, he featured in Steffan Roe Griffiths' short film, Gary Stevenson – Life Out of Balance, and appeared on BBC Politics Live. He wrote a memoir, The Trading Game, named after the event held by Citibank which allowed him to obtain an internship there. It was acquired by Penguin Books in a six-figure deal, and released in March 2024. Joris Luyendijk of The Guardian wrote that it was "a well written and often darkly funny book that makes a convincing case that high finance is as toxic, reckless and deeply cynical as ever." Spotify's Audiobook Wrapped campaign in November 2025 listed The Trading Game as its most popular audiobook among Premium users in the UK.

In 2025, Stevenson appeared on Steven Bartlett's The Diary of a CEO podcast and on Piers Morgan Uncensored. He was approached by the Labour Growth Group for advice on marketing their ideas, prompting him to release a 15-minute video named "Labour want to come on Gary's Economics, should I let them?"

In July 2026, Channel 4 released the documentary How to Get Filthy Rich with Gary Stevenson written and presented by Stevenson. The documentary examines wealth inequality in the United Kingdom by interviewing people across the economic spectrum while arguing for a wealth tax on the super-rich. Critical response to the documentary included The Telegraph describing his ideas for a wealth tax as "impossibly naïve" and The Guardian describing his approach in the show as "just a faintly embarrassing waste of time".

Later in July 2026 he announced that he was stepping back from doing weekly YouTube videos, citing health concerns, however he stated that after a break, he might make a return to public life, possibly doing broadcasts in a podcast format, or doing videos on a monthly basis.

== Book ==
- The Trading Game, Penguin Books, 2024, ISBN 9780241636602

== Recognition ==
In 2025, Stevenson received the Human Act Award, annually presented to a change maker who advances the United Nations’ 17 Sustainable Development Goals. The Human Act foundation cited his contributions to SDG 1 (No Poverty) and SDG 10 (Reduced Inequalities), as well as his public advocacy for fairer tax systems and his involvement in the Millionaires for Humanity campaign.

That same year, he was awarded an honorary degree of Doctor of Social Sciences (Hon DSocSci) by SOAS University of London, this in recognition for his "work, public communication, and campaigning on issues related to economic inequality".
