= Clifton Down (ward) =

Electoral ward in Bristol, England

Coordinates: 51.4646°N 2.6109°W

- ward Bristol City Council
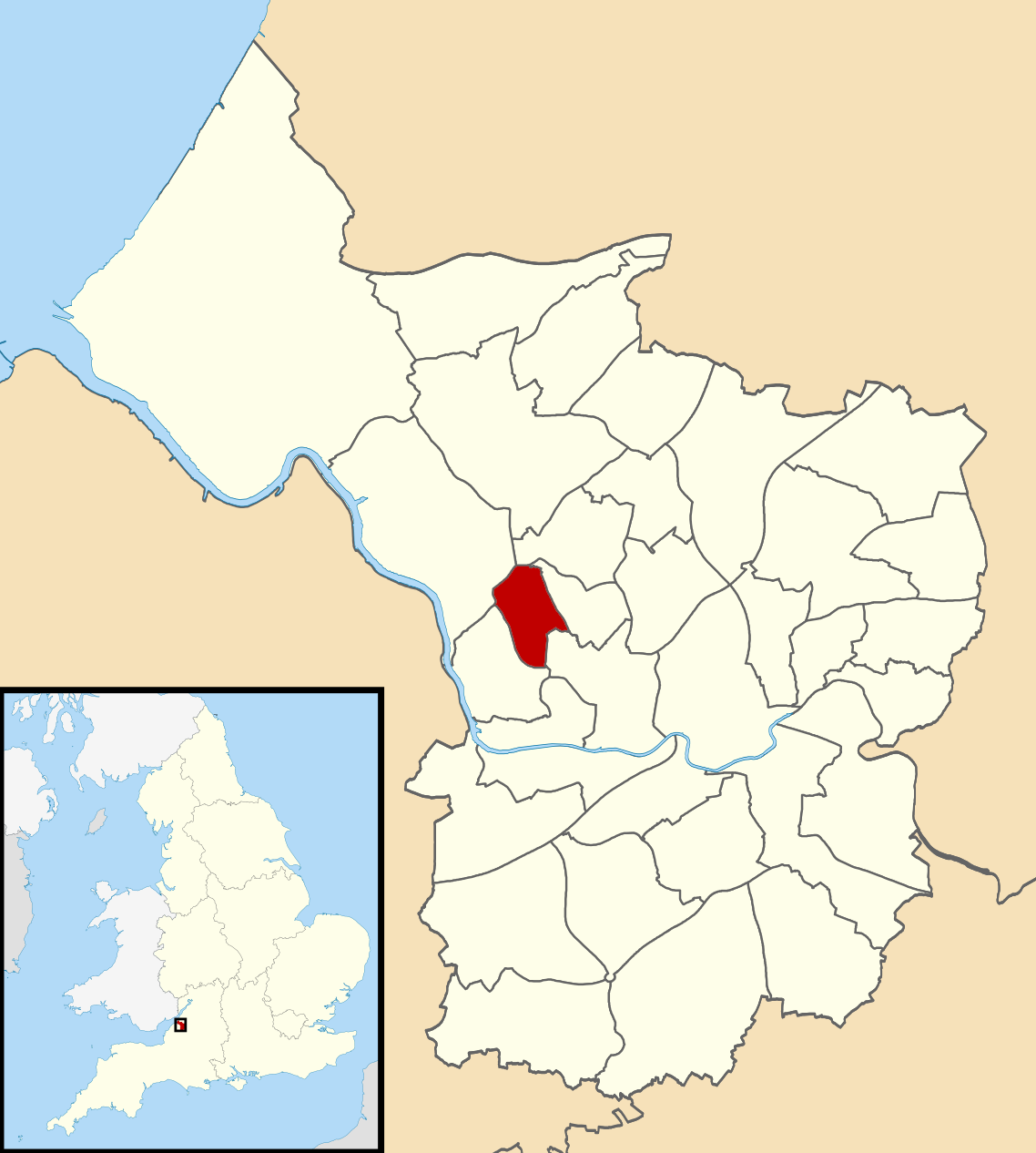
- Ward boundaries since 2016.
- County: Bristol
- Population: 11,429
- Electorate: 7,695

Current ward
- Created: 2016
- Councillor: George Calascione (Green)
- Councillor: Serena Ralston (Green)
- Created from: Clifton East, Cotham
- UK Parliament constituency: Bristol Central

Clifton Down is one of the thirty-four electoral wards in the city of Bristol in the southwest of England, United Kingdom. It is represented by two members on Bristol City Council, which as of 2024 are George Calascione and Serena Ralston of the Green Party of England and Wales.

Clifton Down ward was created in May 2016 following a boundary review. It incorporates areas that were previously part of Clifton East and Cotham wards. From 2016-2024, it was represented by Carla Denyer, who stood down to successfully campaign as Member of Parliament for the Bristol Central constituency.

== Area profile ==
The ward covers the area between the Downs, Pembroke Road, Hampton Road and Queens Road, with Whiteladies Road running down the middle. The ward includes parts of the neighbourhoods of Clifton, Redland, and Cotham, although these are primarily in neighbouring council wards. Notable places in the Clifton Down ward include Clifton Down railway station, Clifton Down Shopping Centre, Whiteladies Picture House, The Bristol Improv Theatre and Bristol Lido.

Many students live in Clifton Down. Over 30% of the population is aged 20–24, significantly higher than the national average.

For elections to the Parliament of the United Kingdom, Clifton Down is part of the Bristol Central constituency. Before the 2024 constituency boundary changes it was in Bristol West.

== Local elections ==
=== 2024 election ===
Clifton Down (2 seats)
Party	Candidate	Votes	%	±%
Green	Serena Ralston	1,813	56.96	−3.30
Green	George Calascione	1,705	53.57	+10.61
Labour	Tristran Harris	903	28.37	+6.80
Labour	Nick Smith	803	25.23	+9.19
Conservative	Michael Abbott	294	9.24	−1.77
Conservative	Harry Lucas	250	7.85	−1.88
Liberal Democrats	Elizabeth Badman	186	5.84	−5.07
Liberal Democrats	Merche Clark	166	5.22	−5.28
TUSC	Suzanne Muna	78	2.45	+2.45
Turnout		3,183	41.36	−3.24
Green hold				
Green hold				

=== 2021 election ===
Clifton Down (2 seats)
Party	Candidate	Votes	%	±%
Green	Carla Suzanne Denyer	2,458	60.26	+26.83
Green	Tom Hathway	1,752	42.95	+16.29
Labour	Elliott Jacob Callender	880	21.57	−4.83
Labour	Teresa Ann Stratford	654	16.03	−4.37
Conservative	Jude Fabio D'Alesio	449	11.01	−9.63
Liberal Democrats	Merche Clark	445	10.91	−7.02
Liberal Democrats	Laura Kirsten Barry	428	10.49	−5.65
Conservative	Edward Alexander De'Mayene Gibson	397	9.73	−7.98
Turnout		4,079	46.09	−1.40
Green hold				
Green hold				

=== 2016 election ===
Clifton Down (2 seats)
Party	Candidate	Votes	%	±%
Green	Carla Denyer	1,255	33.43	
Green	Clive Stevens	1,001	26.66	
Labour	Philip Jardine	991	26.40	
Conservative	Sarah Cleave	775	20.64	
Labour	Satnam Singh*	766	20.40	
Liberal Democrats	Tom Stubbs	673	17.93	
Conservative	Steve Smith	665	17.71	
Liberal Democrats	Joshua Warwick-Smith	606	16.14	
Independent	Dawn Parry	273	7.27	
Turnout		3,754	47.49	
Green win (new seat)				
Green win (new seat)				

*On 22 April 2016, it was announced that Satnam Singh had been suspended from the Labour Party for failing to disclose prior convictions for selling illegal tobacco and drugs. As the nominations process had already been completed, it was too late for Labour to nominate a new candidate or withdraw Mr Singh from the ballot.

== See also ==
- Clifton Down public open space
- Clifton Down railway station
