= Clifton East (former ward) =

Former electoral ward in Bristol, England

Coordinates: 51.4646°N 2.6109°W

- Location within Bristol
- Population: 10,581
- OS grid reference: ST571737
- Unitary authority: Bristol
- Ceremonial county: Bristol
- Region: South West
- Country: England
- Sovereign state: United Kingdom
- Post town: BRISTOL
- Postcode district: BS8
- Dialling code: 0117
- Police: Avon and Somerset
- Fire: Avon
- Ambulance: South Western
- UK Parliament: Bristol West

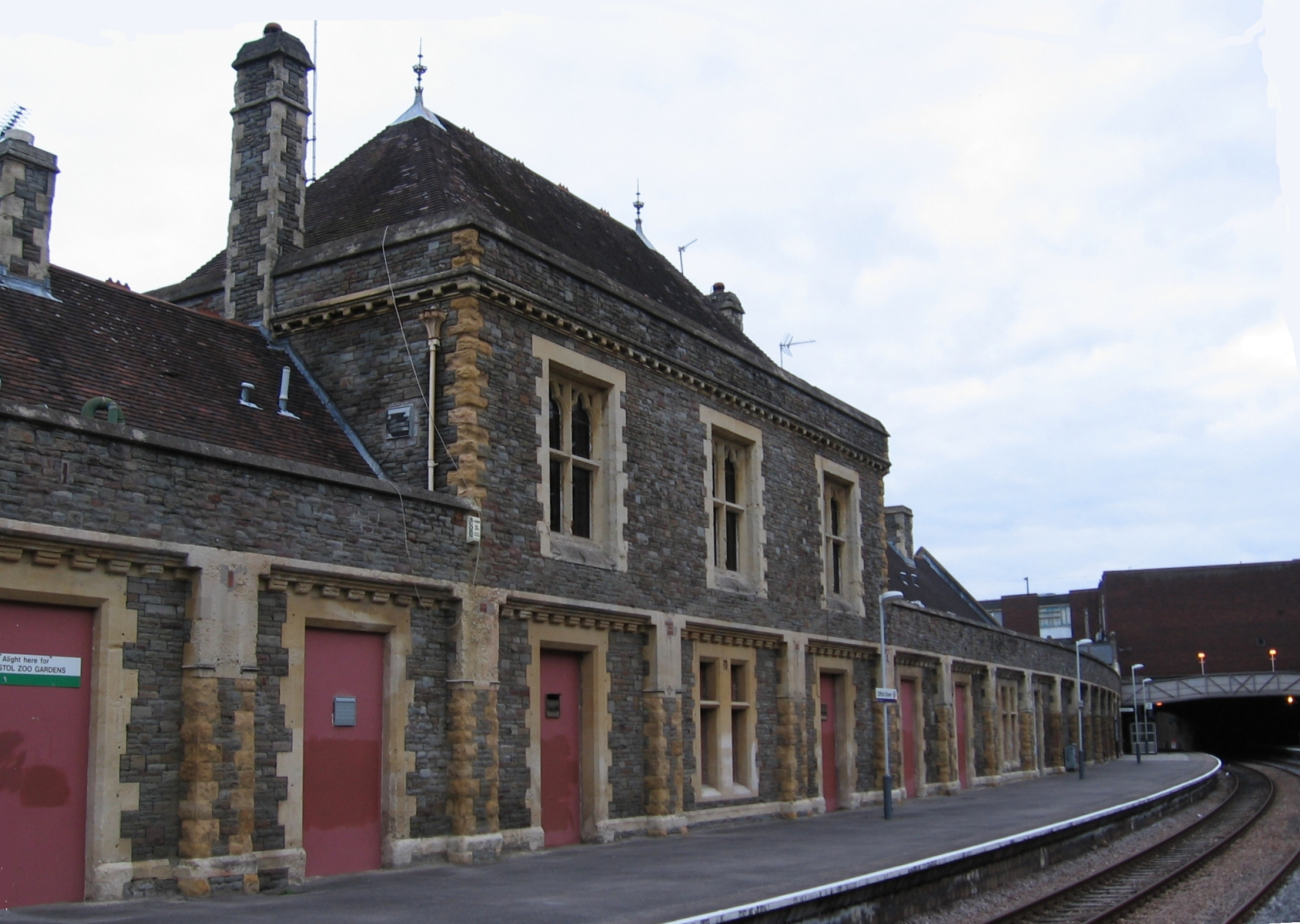
Clifton Down railway station, which is located in the Clifton East ward.

Clifton East was one of the thirty-five council wards in Bristol, England. As the name suggests, the ward covered the eastern part of the Clifton area of Bristol. The ward ceased to exist in May 2016 following a boundary review. It was mostly replaced by a new ward called Clifton Down, with the south-west corner of Clifton East being moved into the neighbouring ward of Clifton.”

Many students lived in Clifton East. 30% of the population is aged 20–24, compared with a national average of 9%.

Notable places in the Clifton East ward include Clifton Down railway station, Clifton Pool and The Victoria Public House and the Bristol Improv Theatre, first improvised theatre in the South West.

Running down the length of the ward is Whiteladies Road, which includes many shops and offices, as well as some houses. The property numbering is unusual in that even numbers are on the left, and odds on the right, heading out from the city centre, contrary to usual practice. The ABC Cinema on Whiteladies Road was converted into offices and gymnasium in the 1990s but there are now plans to re-open it as a cinema. Just off Whiteladies Road, the Clifton Lido was built in 1850 but closed to the public in 1990; it was redeveloped and opened again to the public in November 2008.

Bristol City Council changed the layout of Whiteladies Road in 2011–12, affecting traffic and pedestrians and causing controversy amongst local campaigners.
