= Clifton, Bristol =

Suburb of Bristol, England

Coordinates: 51.46°N 2.62°W

Clifton
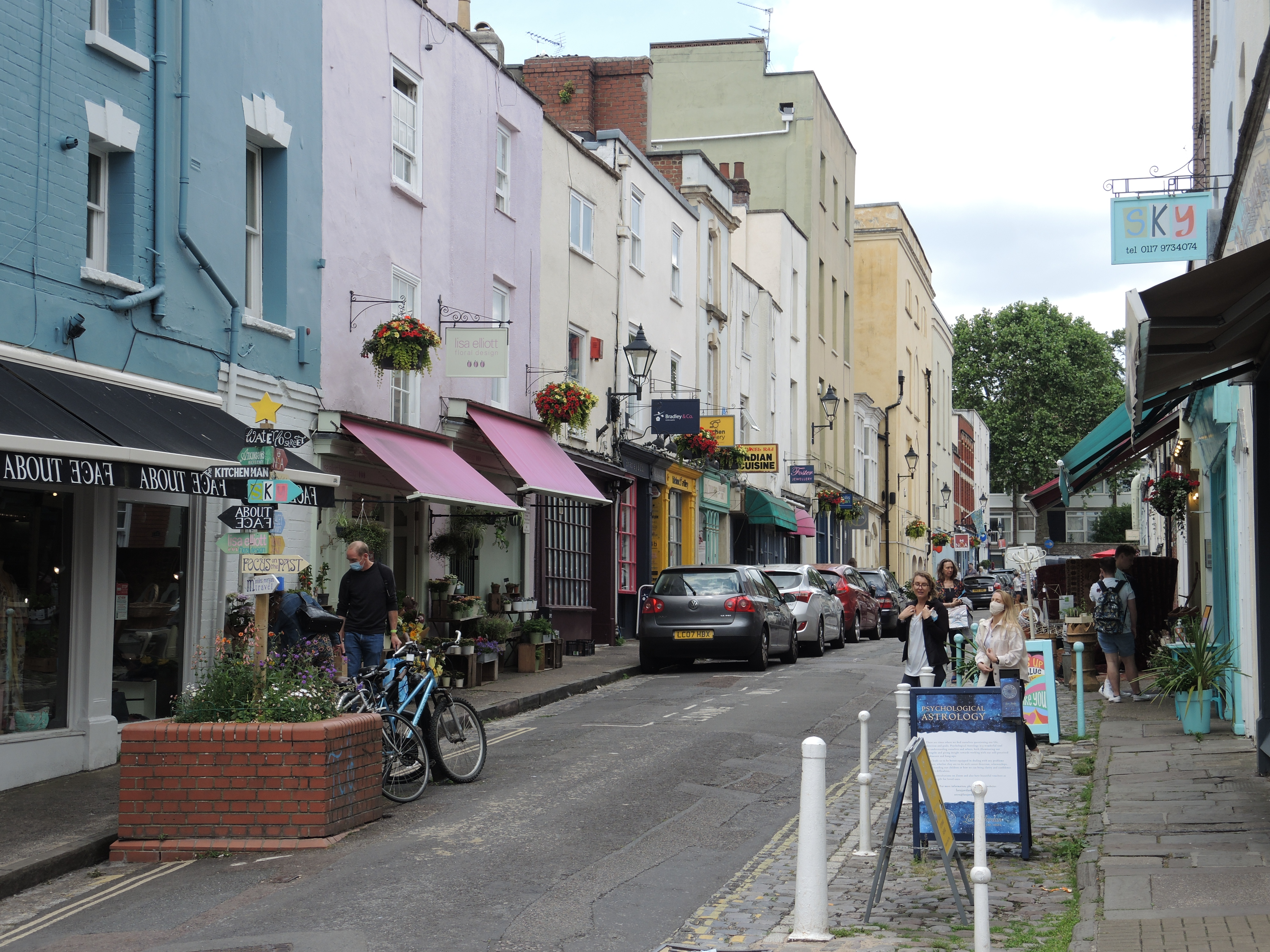
- Clifton, Bristol

- Location within Bristol
- Population: 21,818 Both wards (2011)
- OS grid reference: ST571737
- Unitary authority: Bristol
- Ceremonial county: Bristol
- Region: South West
- Country: England
- Sovereign state: United Kingdom
- Post town: BRISTOL
- Postcode district: BS8
- Dialling code: 0117
- Police: Avon and Somerset
- Fire: Avon
- Ambulance: South Western
- UK Parliament: Bristol Central

Clifton is an inner suburb of Bristol, England, and the name of one of the city's thirty-five electoral wards. The Clifton ward also includes the areas of Cliftonwood and Hotwells. The eastern part of the suburb lies within the ward of Clifton Down.

Clifton is home to Isambard Kingdom Brunel's Clifton Suspension Bridge; many buildings of the University of Bristol, including Goldney Hall; the Roman Catholic Clifton Cathedral; Christ Church, Clifton Down; Clifton College; Clifton High School; the former Amberley House preparatory school; Queen Elizabeth's Hospital School and The Clifton Club. It is also noted for the Downs, a large, open park.

== Geography ==
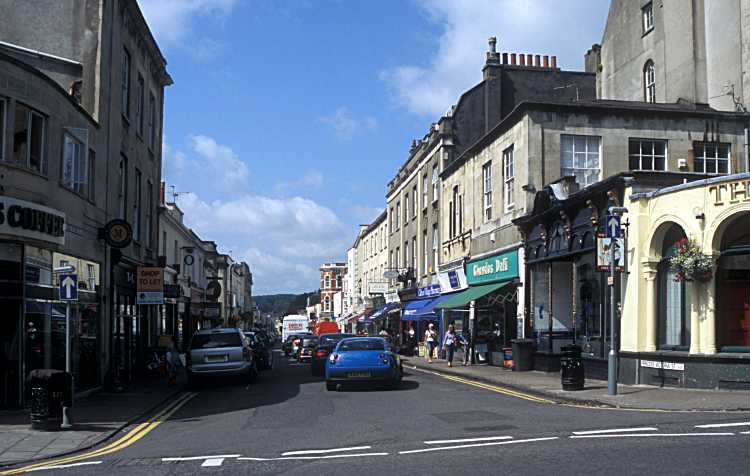
Princess Victoria Street lies at the heart of Clifton Village

Although the suburb has no formal boundaries, the name Clifton is generally applied to the high ground stretching from Whiteladies Road in the east to the rim of the Avon Gorge in the west, and from Clifton Down and Durdham Down in the north to Cornwallis Crescent in the south. This area corresponds roughly with the Bristol City Council electoral wards of Clifton and Clifton Down, albeit with some discrepancies. The southern boundary of Clifton ward is Hotwells Road, encompassing the hillside areas that might typically be considered to be the Cliftonwood and Hotwells neighbourhoods rather than Clifton. The eastern boundary of Clifton Down ward encompasses Redland Park and Cotham Hill, which might typically be considered to be in the Redland and Cotham neighbourhoods.

Clifton has several neighbourhood focal points, including Whiteladies Road, an important shopping district to the east, and Clifton Village, a smaller shopping area near the Avon Gorge to the west.

== History ==
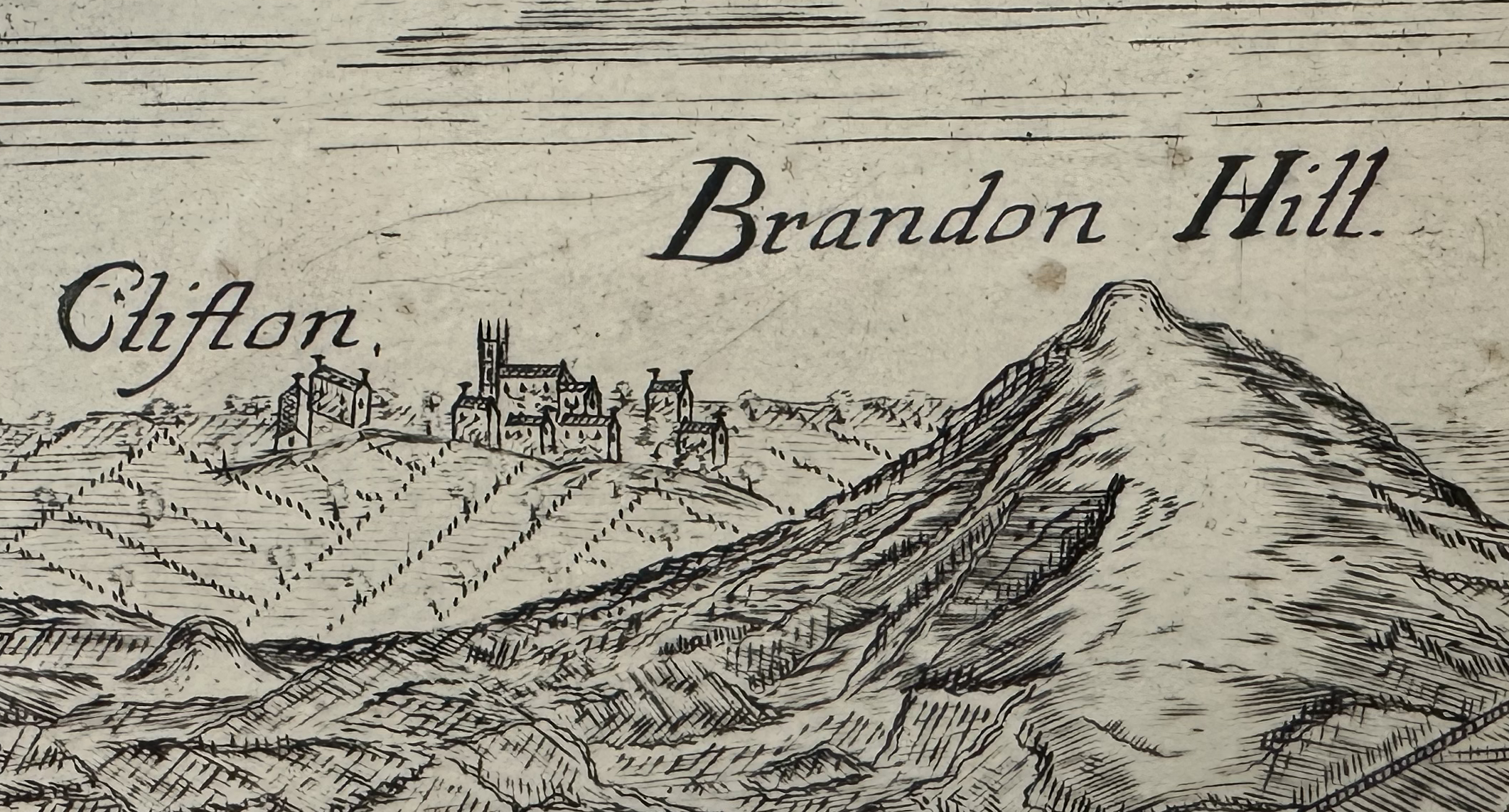
Clifton in Millerd's 1673 prospect of Bristol

Clifton was recorded in the Domesday Book as Clistone, the name of the village denoting a 'hillside settlement' and referring to its position on a steep hill. Situated to the west of Bristol city centre, it was at one time a separate settlement. The earliest depiction of the village is as a detail in James Millerd's 1673 prospect of Bristol.

The village became attached to Bristol by continuous development during the Georgian era and was formally incorporated into the city in the 1830s. Until 1898, Clifton St Andrew was a separate civil parish within the Municipal Borough of Bristol. In 1891 the parish had a population of 29,345. On 30 September 1896, the parish was abolished to form North Bristol.

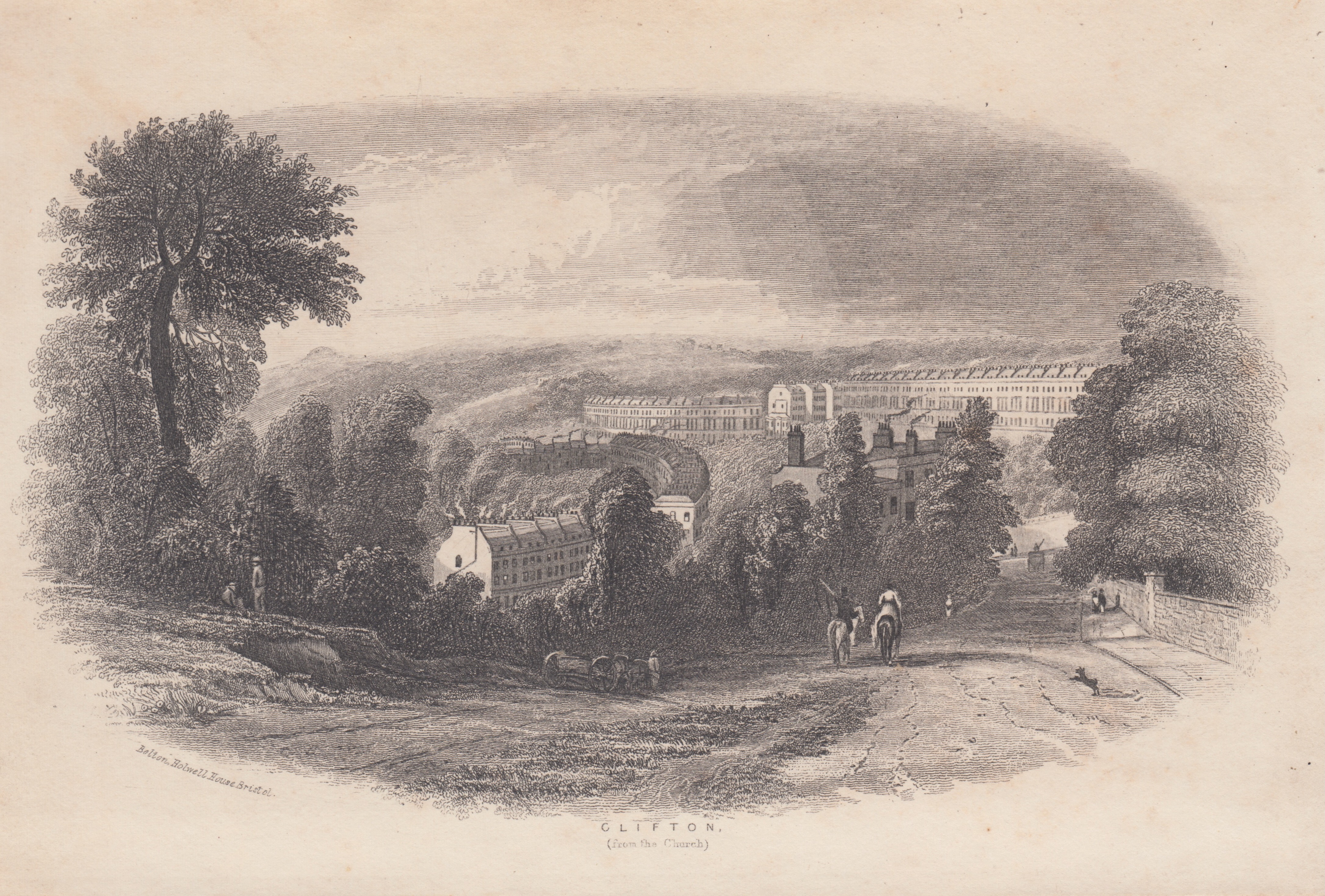
A print c. 1840 of Clifton seen from St Andrew's Church, which was destroyed by bombs during World War Two

Clifton is one of the oldest and most affluent areas of the city, much of it having been built with profits from tobacco and the slave trade. Grand houses that required many servants were built in the area. Although some were detached or semi-detached properties, the bulk were built as terraces, many with three or more floors. One famous terrace is the majestic Royal York Crescent, visible from the Avon Gorge below and looking across the Bristol docks. Berkeley Square and Berkeley Crescent, which were built around 1790, are examples of Georgian architecture. Secluded squares include the triangular Canynge Square. The Whiteladies Picture House on Whiteladies Road was converted into offices and a gymnasium in 2001 but it was re-opened as a cinema by Everyman Cinemas in 2016. Clifton Lido was built in 1850 but closed to the public in 1990, it was redeveloped and opened again to the public in November 2008.

On 17 December 1978 a bomb on Queen's Road in Clifton detonated, injuring at least seven people. The Provisional IRA was responsible.

== Transport ==
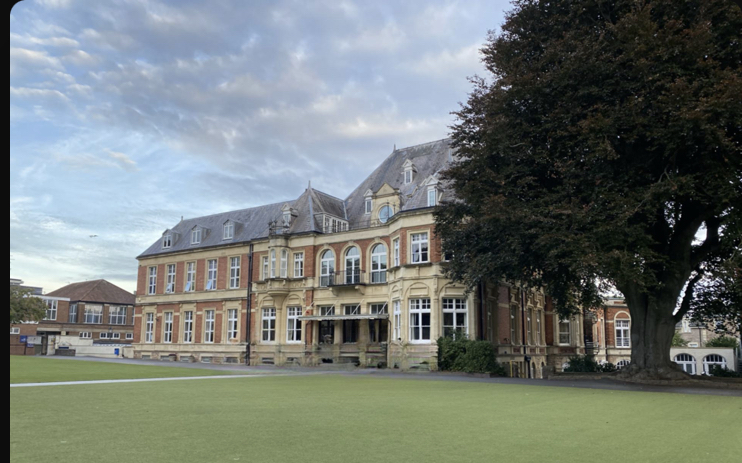
Clifton High school, in Clifton

Clifton is served by Clifton Down railway station on the local Severn Beach railway line, and by frequent bus services from central Bristol. It has road links to the city centre and outer western suburbs, and across the Clifton Suspension Bridge to Leigh Woods in North Somerset. Between 1893 and 1934, it was connected to Hotwells by the Clifton Rocks Railway.

== Natural history ==
Clifton has a long history of natural history television programming and global conservation, due to the presence of the former Bristol Zoo in the north of the neighbourhood, and the BBC Natural History Unit on Whiteladies Road, which means that more than 25% of the world's wildlife programmes are made in Bristol. Animal Magic with Johnny Morris was filmed at Bristol Zoo for the duration of the programme (1963–1983).

The UK arm of the conservation charity Ape Action Africa, which rescues and rehabilitates chimpanzees and gorillas in Cameroon, West Africa, operates out of Clifton.

== Clifton electoral ward ==
Clifton
- ward Bristol City Council
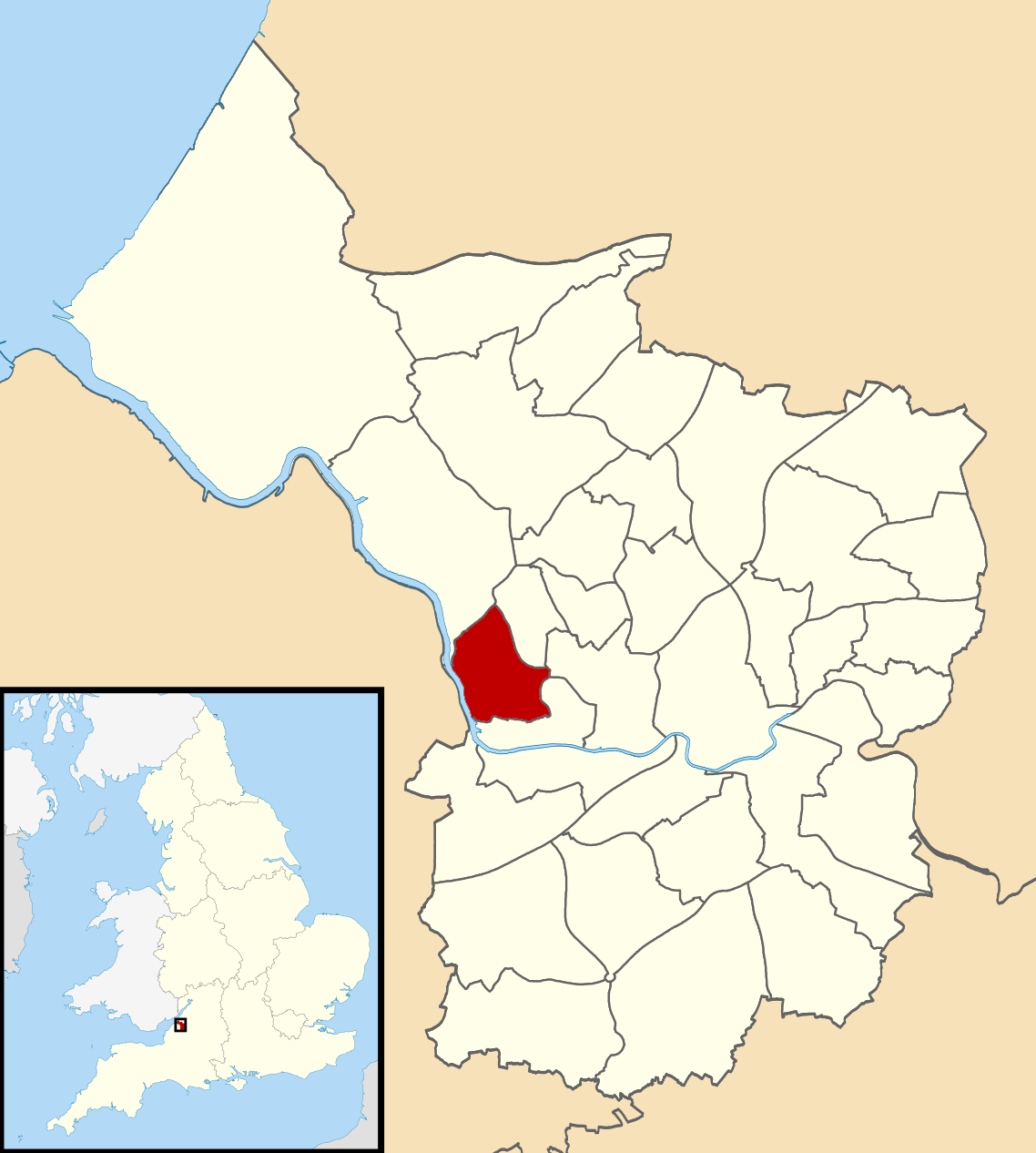
- Ward boundaries since 2016.
- County: Bristol
- Population: 13,022
- Electorate: 8,883

Current ward
- Created: 1974
- Councillor: Paula O'Rourke (Green)
- Councillor: Jerome Thomas (Green)
- UK Parliament constituency: Bristol Central

Clifton electoral ward covers the central and southwestern parts of Clifton, plus Cliftonwood and the hillside areas of Hotwells as far south as Hotwells Road. The ward is represented by two members on Bristol City Council, which as of 2024 are Paula O'Rourke and Jerome Thomas, both of the Green Party of England and Wales.

Clifton was first created as an electoral ward at the time that the County of Avon was created in 1974, electing 1 member to Avon County Council and 3 members to Bristol City Council. The boundaries were revised in 1980 and 2016.

Councillors representing Clifton ward since 2016
Elected	Councillor	Party	Electorate	Turnout
2024	Paula O'Rourke	Green	8,883	39%
2024	Jerome Thomas	Green	8,883	39%
2021	Katy Grant	Green	9,845	48.57%
2021	Paula O'Rourke	Green	9,845	48.57%
2016	Paula O'Rourke	Green		
2016	Jerome Thomas	Green		

Before 2016, Bristol City Council used a system of elections by thirds, in which councillors sat for four year terms, but elections took place in three out of every four years, with roughly one third of seats up for election at any one time. Clifton ward therefore elected one of its two councillors at a time, in elections taking place every second year.

Councillors representing Clifton ward before 2016
Elected	Councillor	Party
2015	Jerome Thomas	Green
2013	Charles Lucas	Conservative
2011	Barbara Janke	Liberal Democrats
2009	Trevor Blythe	Liberal Democrats
2007	Barbara Janke	Liberal Democrats

== Famous and notable residents ==
- Svetlana Alliluyeva (1926–2011) – later known as Lana Peters, Stalin's daughter
- David Anderson – vicar of Clifton Church (1864–1881)
- Eveline Dew Blacker – early woman architect (1884–1956)
- Angela Carter – author (whilst studying at the University of Bristol)
- Carla Denyer – councillor for Clifton (2015–2024), MP for Bristol Central (2024-present), and former Green Party co-leader (2021–2025).
- Eliza Walker Dunbar – early woman doctor
- Eugénie de Montijo – later Empress Eugenie of France, wife of Napoleon III, was a student in Royal York Crescent where she was known as "Carrots"
- James Fisher 1912–1970), author, editor, broadcaster, naturalist and ornithologist
- Keith Floyd – restaurateur and TV personality
- W. G. Grace (1848–1915) – cricketer and surgeon
- Francis Greenway – renowned Australian architect and designer of The Clifton Club
- John Grimshaw – founder of Sustrans and a voice for cyclists in the UK.
- Sarah Guppy – inventor and collaborator with Isambard Kingdom Brunel
- Charles Hansom – architect of Clifton College
- Henry Selby Hele-Shaw – engineer and inventor of the Hele-Shaw clutch, Professor at the University of Bristol
- Victoria Hughes – carer for prostitutes whilst cleaning the public toilets on Clifton Down
- John James - businessman and philanthropist
- Annie Kenney – leading suffragette
- Thomas Babington MacAulay (1800–1859) – historian
- Charles Miles – cricketer and soldier
- Peter Nichols – actor and playwright at the Bristol Old Vic
- Frank Norman – novelist and playwright
- Peter O'Toole (1932–2013) – actor starting his career at the Bristol Old Vic
- Edward Innes Pocock – Scottish rugby player, member of Cecil Rhodes' Pioneer Column, born in Clifton in 1855
- Reginald Innes Pocock (1863–1947) – British zoologist, Edward's younger brother
- Charles Ross – Medieval English historian, lectured at the University of Bristol
- J. D. Sedding – English church architect
- Ellen Sharples and Rolinda Sharples – artist family
- Tom Stoppard (1937–2025) – playwright
- John Addington Symonds – poet and essayist
- Paule Vézelay – artist
- Richmond Waller – English cricketer and decorated Royal Marines officer
- Fabian Ware – Founder of the Commonwealth War Graves Commission. Born Clifton 17 June 1869
- Sir Lawrence Weaver – influential editor of Country Life, architectural writer and organiser of the British Empire Exhibition in Wembley in 1924
- William West – artist and builder of Clifton Observatory

== In popular culture ==
In Frances Burney's novel Evelina (1778), young gentlemen are racing their phaetons on the public highways of Clifton (then still outside Bristol), and not without incident.

Clifton also features briefly in Tobias Smollett's epistolary novel The Expedition of Humphry Clinker (1771).

Part of the background to Philippa Gregory's historical novel A Respectable Trade – dealing mainly with the slave trade in late 18th-century Bristol – is the start of construction at Clifton, then a far area outside the city limits as they were at the time. In some passages characters debate whether Clifton could ever become viable and whether investment in real estate there would not be too risky – questions which were evidently quite relevant at the time though to the modern reader the answers are obvious.

Helen Dunmore's final novel, Birdcage Walk, is set in Clifton. The title refers to the walk that runs through St Andrew's cemetery, formerly the graveyard of now-demolished St Andrew's church. The novel's protagonist is the second wife of a terrace architect who loses investor support following the French Revolution.

The song "Clifton in the Rain" by Al Stewart appears on his first album Bed-Sitter Images.

The song "32 West Mall", which appeared on the 1971 album Stackridge was named after the communal flat that the band shared as their headquarters at 32 West Mall in 1970.

The 1978 children's paranormal drama "The Clifton House Mystery" – produced by HTV; was set in the Clifton area. The plot revolved around a family moving into an old house; and subsequently finding a skeleton of a long-dead person in a hidden room. After some unexplained incidents, they become convinced that a ghost connected in some way with the Bristol Riots of 1831 is haunting the house. The plot is based on the story of the real-life Thomas Brereton, a Dragoon commander who committed suicide after being court-martialled for his lenient approach to suppressing the rioters; although the ghost is named "George Bretherton" in the TV series.

Clifton has been featured in many television sitcoms, including the late 1970s and early 1980s TV series Shoestring, which was set in Bristol and starred Trevor Eve as a radio reporter and part-time sleuth. Much of the BBC series Mistresses was set there, including the 2008, 2009 and 2010 seasons. The TV series Teachers was partly filmed in Clifton, as was teen drama Skins and Being Human. Costume drama The House of Eliott was also largely filmed in Clifton, including at Goldney Hall and Berkeley Square.

The long-running hospital drama Casualty also drew on Clifton for many scenes between 1986 and 2009, when it was filmed in Bristol.

In a 2017 episode of the American historical adventure television series Black Sails, Blackbeard played by Ray Stevenson mentions Clifton as being the home of his mother.

A number of films have also been set in Clifton, including The Truth About Love (2005) starring Dougray Scott and Jennifer Love Hewitt, The Foolish Things (2005), starring Lauren Bacall and Anjelica Huston, and Starter for 10 (2006), starring James McAvoy and produced by Tom Hanks, which was filmed largely on Royal York Crescent. The 1962 film about delinquent teenagers, Some People, starring Kenneth More and Ray Brooks was filmed in and around Clifton.

== Cliftonwood ==
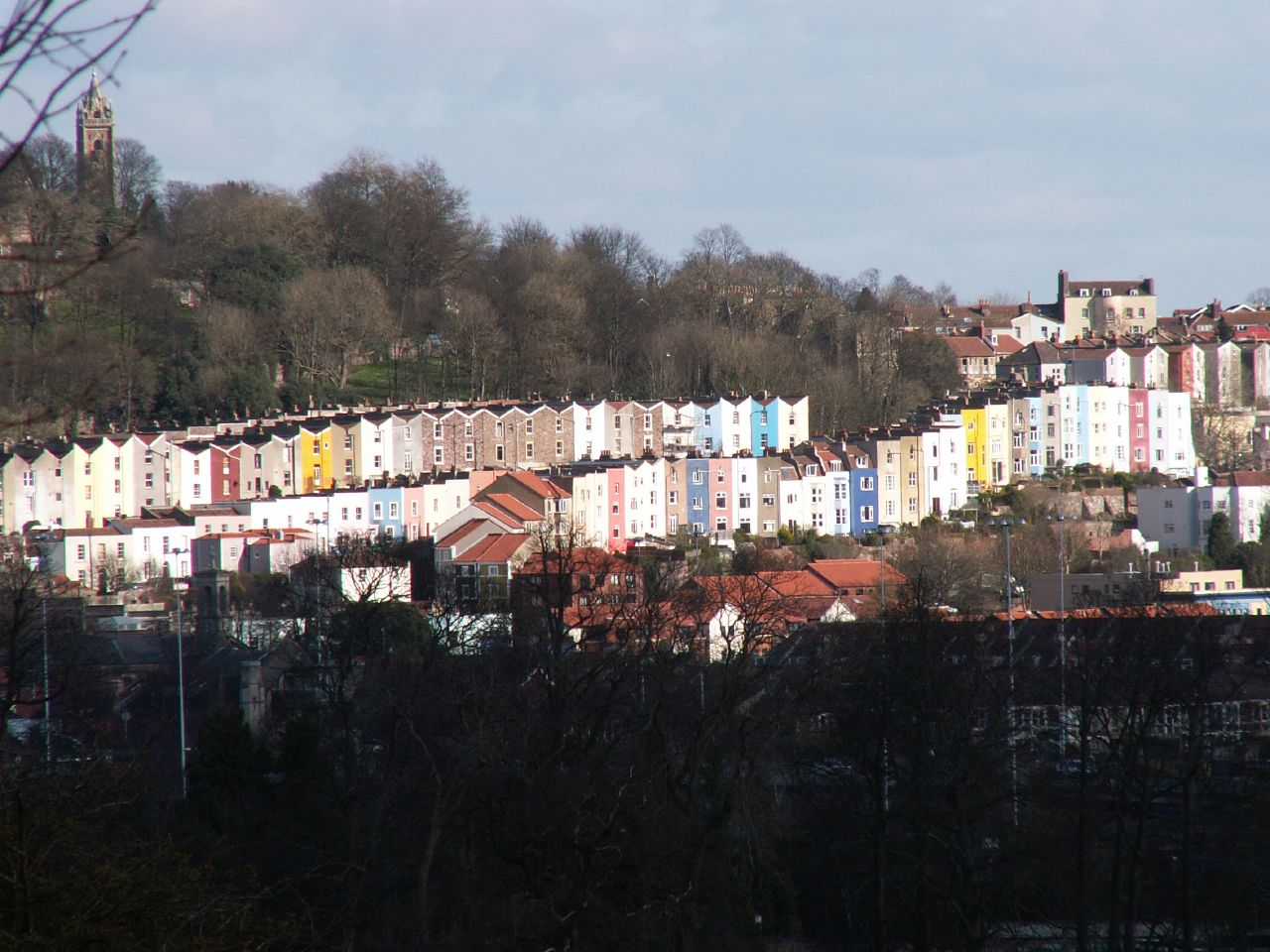
Houses in Cliftonwood and Hotwells, with Brandon Hill and Cabot Tower visible in the background.

Cliftonwood is a small suburb of Bristol, bounded approximately by the Hotwells Road to the south, Jacob's Wells Road and Constitution Hill to the East and North East, Clifton Vale to the West, and by the gardens of Goldney Hall, a University of Bristol hall of residence, to the north. Due to the geography of the area, there are only two roads in and out: Ambra Vale in the south-west corner, and Clifton Wood Road in the north-east, though there are many footpaths. On some sources the area is spelled Cliftonwood (one word), and in some Clifton Wood (two words). For elections to Bristol City Council, Cliftonwood is part of Clifton ward.

The suburb is primarily a residential area, with the only commercial premises being the Lion pub. Housing is largely large Victorian terraces, which are often painted bright colours – the coloured houses one can see when standing on Bristol's harbourside and looking up at Cliftonwood are the backs of houses on Ambrose Road and Clifton Wood Terrace.

A medieval Jewish ritual bath known as a mikveh was discovered in 1987 in the former Hotwells Police Station bicycle shed by the Temple Local History group. This is believed to be the origin of the name Jacob's Well, also given to the adjoining road.
