= Murder of Jody Dobrowski =

Homophobic hate crime in 2005

Jody Dobrowski
- Born: 27 June 1981; Stroud, Gloucestershire, England
- Died: 15 October 2005 (aged 24); Clapham Common, London, England
- Cause of death: Beating
- Occupations: Assistant bar manager at Jongleurs comedy club in Camden Town, London

Jody Dobrowski (27 June 1981 – 15 October 2005) was an English 24-year-old assistant bar manager who was murdered on Clapham Common in south London. On 14 October, at around midnight, he was beaten to death with punches and kicks by two men who believed him to be gay, and pronounced dead in the early hours of 15 October. Tests carried out at St. George's Hospital in Tooting, South London revealed Dobrowski had a swollen brain, broken nose and extensive bruising to his neck, spine and groin. His family was unable to identify him due to his face being so badly disfigured and he had to be identified by fingerprints.

His two assailants, Thomas Pickford and Scott Walker, pleaded guilty to the murder of Dobrowski at the Old Bailey criminal court on 12 May 2006 and were sentenced to life imprisonment on 16 June 2006 with a minimum of 28 years to be served. Both men had been involved in an attack against a gay man two weeks prior to the murder of Dobrowski. Walker had been out on licence due to threats against his mother but the licence had expired the day before the murder; however, it had not expired at the time of the previous homophobic assault.

This was a landmark case in Britain, where Section 146 of the Criminal Justice Act 2003 was utilised in sentencing the killers. This Act empowers courts to impose tougher sentences for offences motivated or aggravated by the victim's sexual orientation in England and Wales. The trial judge was Brian Barker QC.

== Background ==
Dobrowski was born on 27 June 1981 in Stroud, Gloucestershire, England. He studied Biomedical Sciences with Toxicology at the University of Wales Institute, Cardiff, and moved to London in 2001. There he got a job as show manager at the Battersea Jongleurs/Bar Risa club, the flagship venue of the famous stand-up comedy club chain. A few weeks prior to his murder, Dobrowski was offered an assistant manager position at the Camden Lock branch of the club.

In an interview with The Times, the bouncer for the club that Dobrowski worked at said, "if you had met this gentleman, you would know him to be a fresh-faced young man who never said a nasty word to anyone, even to the drunks who came in off the street. That was his way: a kind, sweet guy." After the sentencing of Pickford and Walker, Dobrowski's family made a joint statement describing him as, "an intelligent, funny, hardworking and beautiful man, whose life was brutally and mercilessly punched and kicked from him."

== The attack ==
The last hours of Dobrowski's life are not totally clear. On Friday 14 October 2005 it is reported that he visited friends in Clapham where he had worked prior to moving clubs for his promotion. He left friends at around 10.15pm and was a ten-minute walk from Clapham Common. His killers had been roaming Clapham Common after a night of drinking. The judge, Brian Barker, said that the pair had gone to Clapham Common specifically to commit acts of "homophobic thuggery". Dobrowski crossed paths with the two men who automatically assumed he was gay, as Clapham Common is a well known cruising site for gay men.

Police say there was a short exchange of words before Pickford started to throw punches at Dobrowski. Walker then joined in the attack. One witness who intervened was warned off and told, "We don't like poofters here and that's why we can kill him if we want." They then continued their attack for an unknown length of time whilst, according to witnesses, continually throwing homophobic insults. The injuries that were left were so severe a pathologist was unable to identify how many times he had been hit but did identify 33 areas of injury to the head, face, ears and neck. Dobrowski had to be identified by fingerprints. A police officer who arrived at the scene of the crime described him as, "a bloody swollen pulp." He was unconscious when found in the early hours of Saturday 15 October and died from his injuries later in hospital.

There was a lot of media attention on the attack due to its brutality, Dobrowski's sexuality, and this being considered a hate crime. Police eventually tracked down the murderers who were arrested one week after the crime and eventually confessed on 12 May 2006. In January 2006, they denied committing the offence but later recanted.

== Film Clapham Junction ==
In 2007, UK's Channel 4 released Clapham Junction, a TV drama partially based on the murder. The film, written by Kevin Elyot and directed by Adrian Shergold, was shown for the first time on 22 July 2007, on Channel 4, almost two years after the murder. It features David Leon as Alfie Cartwright, a gay man who is subjected to a beating on Clapham Common and dies of his injuries. It was screened to mark the 40th anniversary of the decriminalisation of homosexuality in England and Wales, and highlighted violence against gays and hate crimes based on sexual orientation. It was shown a second time on More4 on 30 July 2007.

== See also ==
- Homophobia
- Violence against LGBT people
- Clapham Junction, the 2007 Channel 4 TV drama
