= Polar Bears (play) =

2010 play by Mark Haddon

- Written by: Mark Haddon
- Characters: Sandy, John, Kay, Margaret, Jesus, Girl
- Original language: English
- Subject: Bipolar disorder
- Genre: Drama

Premiere
- Date premiered: April 1, 2010
- Place premiered: Donmar Warehouse, London

Polar Bears is a play by British writer Mark Haddon, first produced by the Donmar Warehouse in London. Following previews from 1 April 2010, the play opened on 6 April 2010 where it ran until 22 May. The world premiere production was directed by Jamie Lloyd. The German Oldenburgisches Staatstheater staged the play in 2012 under direction of K.D. Schmidt.

== Original Cast ==
- Sandy – Paul Hilton
- John – Richard Coyle
- Kay – Jodhi May
- Margaret – Celia Imrie
- Jesus – David Leon
- Girl – Skye Bennett/Alice Sykes
