= Richmond Waller =

English cricketer and Royal Marines officer

Richmond Campbell Shakespear Waller
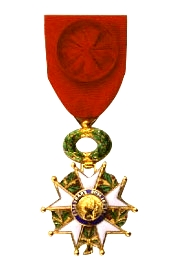
- Born: 26 July 1879; Clifton, Bristol
- Died: 28 June 1950 (aged 70); Colchester, Essex
- Military career
- Allegiance: United Kingdom
- Branch: Royal Marines
- Rank: Lieutenant colonel
- Conflicts: Battle of Jutland; World War I
- Awards: Légion d'honneur Croix de Guerre (France)

Richmond Campbell Shakespear Waller (26 July 1879 – 28 June 1950) was an English cricketer and decorated Royal Marines officer. He was born in Clifton, Bristol. He was educated at Haileybury and Imperial Service College from 1893 to 1897.

== Cricket career ==
Waller made his debut for Devon in the 1909 Minor Counties Championship against Cornwall. From 1909 to 1910, he represented the county in five Championship matches, the last of which came against Berkshire.

Waller played a single first-class match for Army and Navy against a combined Oxford and Cambridge Universities team in 1910. In his only first-class innings he scored a single run before being dismissed by Frank Tuff, and bowled 9 wicket-less overs.

== Military service ==
Waller served in the Royal Marines. He was first mentioned in the London Gazette in 1899, detailing his promotion to lieutenant. In 1909, he was mentioned once more, this time detailing his promotion to captain. Waller served in World War I, where he was present during the Battle of Jutland in 1916. He was mentioned in dispatches by Vice-Admiral Sir Doveton Sturdee:

"This officer [Waller] has served continuously in the Home and Grand Fleet from April, 1913, and has been in charge of the wireless organisation of a Battle Squadron since the commencement of hostilities. This squadron was composed of new ships of various types which had been hurriedly completed and the work entailed in bringing the wireless installations of ships designed for foreign powers' into effective working order was carried out entirely satisfactorily. Is unceasing in his endeavours to improve the wireless of the squadron, and has been of valuable assistance since I have been in command; an excellent Marine Officer."

His praise earned him promotion to brevet major. He later reached the rank of lieutenant colonel and was awarded the Légion d'honneur by France and with it the Croix de Guerre, for his service during the war. He died on 28 June 1950 in Colchester, Essex.
