= Clapham Junction (film) =

2007 British television film

- DVD cover
- Written by: Kevin Elyot
- Directed by: Adrian Shergold
- Starring: David Leon; Stuart Bunce; Joseph Mawle; Luke Treadaway; Richard Lintern
- Music by: Martin Phipps
- Country of origin: United Kingdom
- Original language: English

Production
- Cinematography: Tony Slater-Ling
- Editor: Tim Murrell
- Running time: 99 minutes

Original release
- Network: Channel 4
- Release: 2007

Clapham Junction is a 2007 British television film, written by Kevin Elyot. Directed by Adrian Shergold, the film centres on the experiences of several gay men during a 36-hour period in the Clapham area of London and the consequences when their lives collide. It was first broadcast on Channel 4 on 22 July 2007, repeated on 1 September 2009, and later released on DVD on Region 1.

== Plot ==
From a civil partnership ceremony to a heated dinner party, five stories are woven into London from school and work, to bars and clubs, during one hot summer's night. The film opens with the audio of a weather report highlighting a current heatwave (something referred to intermittently in later dialogue), while the main characters and storylines are briefly introduced; Danny (Jared Thomas) is shown walking down a deserted tunnel in school uniform, Robin (Rupert Graves) is heading into the Channel 4 studios, 14-year-old Theo (Luke Treadaway) takes books from his locker at school and Terry (Paul Nicholls) is at work, driving while listening to headphones. We then see Danny practising the violin before the first scene opens with Robin trying to sell a script he's just finished. The script is rejected because "the whole gay thing...has been done". This sets a general narrative for the whole film, questioning the idea that legal equality and general media acceptance makes being gay no longer an issue.

This is interspersed with scenes from Will (Richard Lintern) and Gavin's (Stuart Bunce) civil partnership, as the two tie the knot and Alfie prepares to act as a waiter for the event. We are briefly introduced to Danny's mother, Dolly (Claire Perkins), who praises her son's prowess to her boss, and see Theo heading to the library, before returning to Terry who returns home to his nan. He is depicted as a doting grandson but clear tensions exist between him and his mother, an apparent alcoholic. Meanwhile, Danny is shown being subjected to homosexual taunts on his way home, and Theo is cruising 29-year-old Tim (Joseph Mawle) in the library, picking up Tim's pen which he has left behind.

Back at the civil partnership, Will clearly takes a shine to the young waiter, Alfie (David Leon). It is soon clear that he has no intention of remaining faithful to Gavin and he makes a move on Alfie as they snort cocaine in the pantry. Will tries to have sex with him, but Alfie refuses, believing Will should remain faithful to Gavin. We then see Terry preparing to go out, and both he and Alfie end up at a gay night club in Vauxhall. They make eyes at each other and eventually start a conversation, only for this to be interrupted when a friend of Alfie's turns up and Terry disappears home with someone else.

Robin goes cruising in the public toilets where he meets Julian (James Wilby). They both exchange knowing glances and are intending to enter one of the cubicles together, when they are interrupted. Robin leaves. He waits outside briefly but doesn't see Julian come out. He heads to a dinner party being held by Roger (Tom Beard) and Belinda (Rachael Blake), where Roger makes it clear that he's unhappy in his marriage and wants to be able to "play the field again".

Alfie leaves the night club alone and finds Will's ring in his pocket along with a note containing his phone number. Terry is at the home of the guy he met at the club (Johnny Harris). It is not a usual hook-up; instead of getting naked, they are awkwardly talking in the living room. The guy mentions that his mother has recently died, and Terry claims his mother is also dead, having been run over by a mail van. The guy then makes a pass at Terry who jumps away, making an excuse about wanting the music turned up. As the guy goes to turn the music up, Terry suddenly and brutally smashes him over the head with an ashtray. As the guy begs for mercy, Terry repeatedly kicks him, forces cigarette butts in his mouth, verbally abuses him, and urinates on him.

Theo's parents arrive at the dinner party and he is left home alone. He goes to his bedroom window, where he can see across into Tim's flat. Seeing Tim appear shirtless by the window in just his boxers, Theo proceeds to kneel beside the window, light a cigarette, drop his shorts and masturbate while looking at Tim.

Back in the public toilets, Julian is still there, spying through a glory hole in one of the cubicles. He attracts a guy in the neighbouring cubicle. Alfie enters the toilets and hears the sound of the two men having sex as he tries to urinate. The guy leaves and Alfie briefly sees Julian with his trousers down inside the cubicle, before he shuts the door. Alfie is then approached by two guys, who chase him out of the toilets and onto Clapham Common. Julian arrives at the dinner party, where Robin recognises him as the guy he saw in the toilets.

Meanwhile, Theo heads over to Tim's flat to return his pen. He tries desperately to enter against Tim's wishes, getting his foot hurt in the process as he tries to hold the door open. Eventually, as others are heard entering the flats, Tim suddenly pulls Theo inside. Once inside, Theo continually makes up reasons to stay, wanting to chat about history and asking for glasses of water. Theo notices that Tim's kitchen has been damaged by a fire, and he tries to bond with Tim over a mutual dislike of others who live in the neighbourhood. It is clear that both are sexually interested in each other, but Tim doesn't want to get involved with someone underage who should be "home for your mum and dad" and continues to try to get rid of him.

At the dinner party, Robin makes several comments intended to remind Julian of the fact that he saw him earlier, leading to him making an angry outburst at the dinner table. Terry is out on Clapham Common where he meets a guy (Tim Woodward) sitting on a bench and sits next to him. The guy is clearly terrified of him, shaking when he offers him a match to light his cigarette. Terry engages him in small talk, with the underlying motive of working out whether the guy is gay or not. They are interrupted by cries from Alfie in the bushes and the guy escapes. Terry finds Alfie badly beaten up, but instead of helping him, he takes Will's ring and puts it on his own finger abandoning Alfie to his sad fate.

The dinner party is disturbed by an ambulance arriving, someone else having found Alfie's heavily bruised body on Clapham Common. Belinda is clearly distressed by this, running outside to see what has happened. Meanwhile, Will and Gavin are sitting on a bench, presumably in another part of Clapham Common given the title of the film (but actually miles away in the park on Primrose Hill in north London), with Will having fallen asleep on Gavin's shoulder. Gavin cuddles up to Will and looks out over London. Terry returns home to his nan who is asleep in bed, while the dinner party discussion turns to gay men and sex in public places. The conversation clearly makes Robin uncomfortable, as Marion rants on about a perceived tendency to "push it [homosexuality] in your face". Belinda, clearly still upset by the beating that has occurred outside, breaks up the argument, making the point that "no one deserves to be treated like that", regardless of whether he was a straight man walking through the park or "sniffing around and fucking like a dog in the bushes".

Back in Tim's flat, Theo confesses to him how he watches him at night and masturbates over his sight. Theo gets upset when Tim laughs at this admission, but they then bond as Tim reassures him that "people are...scared of being different" and "you'll be happy enough". He admits to watching Theo too, and, although he continues to protest, Theo seduces him and they passionately kiss. Theo is the one in control of the situation; he undresses Tim, gives him a blowjob and then penetrates him on the floor. It is even implied that he is rather well sexually experienced, as Tim asks the young teen "Where'd you learn this?".

This scene is intercut with scenes of the dinner party, where Theo's parents discuss a neighbour who they believe is a paedophile. When it is mentioned that the neighbour was recently petrol-bombed, it becomes clear that they are actually discussing Tim. Following this discussion, Natasha (Phoebe Nicholls) demands to go home to "see how my baby is". Returning home, she finds Theo missing from his room and catches sight of him, now dressed again, in Tim's flat. She heads over there, chased by her husband and eventually finds the flat. Theo is notably calm, maintaining the excuse that he came over to give Tim back his pen. Natasha clearly doesn't believe him saying "I can smell it" and threatens Tim before leaving not to "lay eyes on my son".

The next morning, we find that Alfie has died as a result of his injuries. Robin repeatedly insists, both on leaving the dinner party the night before and again the next morning, that Julian should report anything he saw in the toilets to the police. He refuses, and, as far as we know, does nothing. Terry meets another guy in the park with the apparent intention of again trying to teach gay men a lesson, but he is instead the one being taught as he is lured in the woods and beaten up by Merv (Ross O'Hennessey), a much larger guy, who wants to "teach a lesson" to Terry, suspecting Terry of being a gay man. Terry is treated in hospital by Gavin, who discovers the ring on his finger and asks Will about it. The latter claims to have taken the ring to the jeweller's. Will then turns on the television and discovers that Alfie has been murdered.

We again see Theo watching and wanking to the sight of Tim in his flat. Their eyes meet and Theo stands up, appearing fully naked before Tim. In response, Tim closes the curtains. At Danny's music lesson, his teacher observes kids taunting him through the window. She asks him about it, but he claims that nothing's bothering him. He is chased again on the way home, and the closing scene shows his violin lying smashed in the rain-soaked entrance to the tunnel.

== Cast ==
(in alphabetical order)

- Tom Beard as Roger Hopkirk
- James Bellamy as Black youth
- Robin Berry as Man in toilet
- Rachel Blake as Belinda Hopkirk
- Samantha Bond as Marion Rowan
- Stuart Bunce as Gavin
- Philip Childs as Newscaster
- Jason Frederick as Black youth
- Richard Freeman as Registrar
- Rupert Graves as Robin Cape
- Johnny Harris as Gay man in the bar
- Francis Lee as Murray
- David Leon as Alfie
- Richard Lintern as Will
- Joseph Mawle as Tim
- Lewis Morton as Man in toilet
- Paul Nicholls as Terry
- Phoebe Nicholls as Natasha
- Ross O'Hennessy as Large man / Merv
- Neil Pearson as Frank Winterton
- Claire Perkins as Dolly
- Adrian Rawlins as Peter
- Liam Reilly as Yob
- Lucy Russell as Miss Richards
- David Ryall as Vicar
- Jared Thomas as Danny
- Luke Treadaway as Theo
- June Watson as Nan
- James Wilby as Julian Rowan
- Tim Woodward as Man on bench
- Jefferson Hall as postman

== Background and reception ==
The drama was shown as part of a short season by Channel 4 to mark the 40th anniversary of the decriminalisation of homosexuality in England and Wales. The drama caused controversy and received a mixed reaction – particularly from gay viewers who felt it a negative portrayal of gay men, though some found it intelligent and thought-provoking. Producer Elinor Day stated in The Independent that the intention was to raise awareness of homophobia. Interviewed in The Telegraph, writer Kevin Elyot said he did not intend a drama that lectured viewers: "This film is absolutely not that,...I never, ever – I hope – point the finger."

Leigh Holmwood of The Guardian wrote that after having high expectations for the film, he found it to be "a clichéd, relentlessly negative piece that portrayed gay men as selfish, morally bankrupt human beings." In Charlie Brooker's Screenwipe Review of the Year 2007, Brooker describes Clapham Junction as an example of a Channel 4 drama that "set out to be a thought-provoking look at gay issues, but ended up being a little heavy-handed." Variety magazine's Dennis Harvey wrote that "Clapham Junction is an intelligent and engrossing ensemble drama...", but added that it was "...marred just a bit by narrative over-rigging in Kevin Elyot's otherwise sharp, deft script."

Clapham Junction attracted 1.1 million viewers when first broadcast on 22 July 2007, and held a 9% share over two hours from 10pm.

Clapham Junction was inspired by the murder of Jody Dobrowski, which occurred on 14 October 2005 on Clapham Common (the character Alfie, played by David Leon, is based on the events).

== Soundtrack edits ==
In the drama's first screening on 22 July 2007, "I'm With Stupid" by musical duo the Pet Shop Boys was used as background music in the scene featuring Terry's homophobic assault on the man from the club. The assailant, Terry, played by Paul Nicholls, tells his victim he hates the Pet Shop Boys as he assaults him. However, when the programme was repeated on Channel 4's digital channel More4 a few days later, on 30 July 2007, the scene had been altered and the Pet Shop Boys track replaced. The character's dialogue was also dubbed to remove references to the Pet Shop Boys. This was done at the request of the Pet Shop Boys.

In addition to the deletion of the Pet Shop Boys track on the DVD release, the two Dusty Springfield songs featured in the original broadcast, "Some of Your Lovin'" and "The Look of Love" were replaced.

== See also ==
- Murder of Jody Dobrowski
