= Carla Denyer =

British politician (born 1985)

Carla Denyer MP
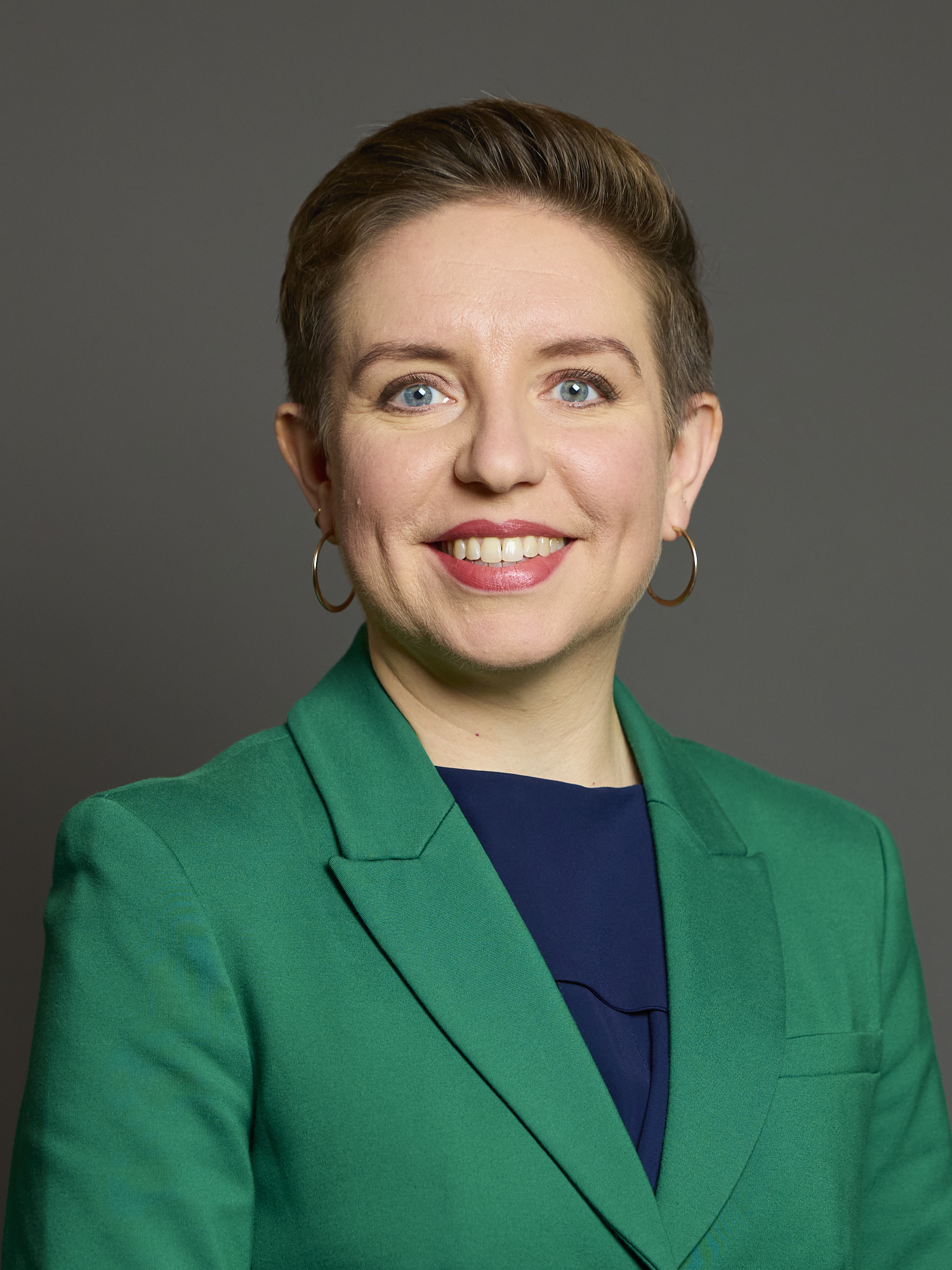
- Official portrait, 2024

Co-leader of the Green Party of England and Wales
- In office 1 October 2021 – 2 September 2025 Serving with Adrian Ramsay
- Deputy: Amelia Womack; Zack Polanski
- Preceded by: Siân Berry
- Succeeded by: Zack Polanski

Member of Parliament for Bristol Central
- Incumbent
- Assumed office 4 July 2024
- Preceded by: Constituency established
- Majority: 10,407 (24.0%)

Bristol City Councillor for Clifton Down Clifton East (2015–2016)
- In office 7 May 2015 – May 2024

Personal details
- Born: Carla Suzanne Denyer; 24 September 1985 (age 41)
- Party: Green Party of England and Wales
- Education: Calthorpe Park Secondary School; The Sixth Form College Farnborough; St Chad's College, Durham (MEng)
- Website: carladenyer.co.uk

Carla Suzanne Denyer (born 24 September 1985) is a British politician who has served as the Member of Parliament for Bristol Central since 2024. She was the co-leader of the Green Party of England and Wales alongside Adrian Ramsay from 1 October 2021 to 2 September 2025.

Denyer was a city councillor in Bristol from 2015 to 2024 (initially for Clifton East ward, and following the 2016 boundary changes, for Clifton Down). She spearheaded Bristol City Council's declaration of a climate emergency in 2018, which was the first in Europe.

== Early life and education ==
Denyer was born in 1985 to John Denyer and Margaret Cooksley; the couple divorced ten years later. Her mother was a scientist, while her father worked in the aerospace industry, for the Ministry of Defence, and for QinetiQ, a defence firm.

Denyer attended Calthorpe Park Secondary School in the Hampshire town of Fleet. She completed A-levels in maths, further maths, physics, and philosophy at The Sixth Form College Farnborough. Alongside extra-curricular participation in debating and public speaking and the Explorer Scouts, she began political campaigning in sixth form by promoting fair trade and campaigning in opposition to the Iraq War.

From 2005 to 2009, Denyer studied mechanical engineering at St Chad's College, Durham, continuing her environmental activism as an environmental representative at her college.

She went on to work in the wind energy sector, moving to Bristol and working for a Bristol-based renewable energy consultancy, GL Garrad Hassan, from 2009 until shifting her career to politics. According to an interview in Vogue, this shift came as Denyer realised that "actually, the technology needed to get to net zero is pretty much there. That's not the problem. The problem is those in power. [...] She realised she needed to get into politics and change the system".

== Political career ==
=== Early career ===
Denyer joined the Green Party in 2011. From 2012 she developed an interest in ethical investment and specifically fossil-fuel divestment through participation in the Quakers and the UK Fossil Free campaign. She participated in bringing about British Quakers' divestment from fossil fuels.

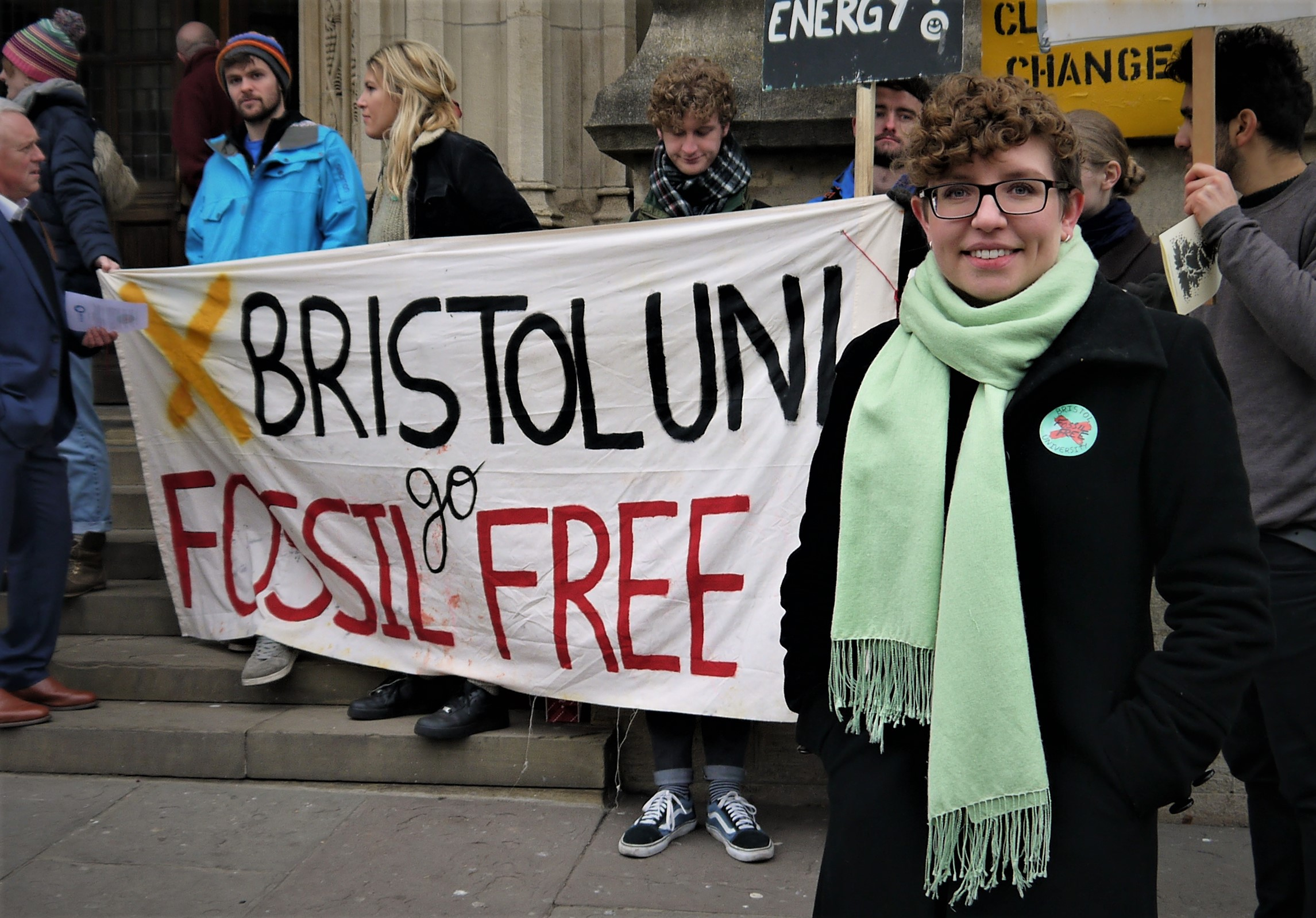
Carla Denyer with Fossil Free divestment campaign, December 2016

Following her work on the Quakers' divestment, Denyer became a leading figure in the campaign for the University of Bristol to divest from fossil fuels, first tabling a motion in her capacity as a city councillor sitting on one of the university's governance bodies in November 2015. Despite initial defeats, the campaign succeeded in March 2017. Denyer has also been active since at least 2015 in the ongoing campaign calling on Avon Pension Fund to divest from fossil fuels.

=== Bristol councillor ===
Denyer was first elected to Bristol City Council as a Green Party councillor for Clifton East in 2015. After boundary changes, she was elected as councillor for Clifton Down in 2016. She was re-elected as a councillor in 2021 with an increased majority, in the context of growing support for the Green Party in Bristol. In June 2021, Denyer was appointed as the Green Party's housing and communities spokesperson, and in July 2021, she took on the role of shadowing Bristol's Labour cabinet on climate and ecology, holding the position jointly with Lily Fitzgibbon.

In November 2023, Denyer announced that she would not seek re-election as councillor in the 2024 Bristol City Council election in order to focus on her campaign for election as member of parliament for Bristol Central constituency.

==== Activities ====
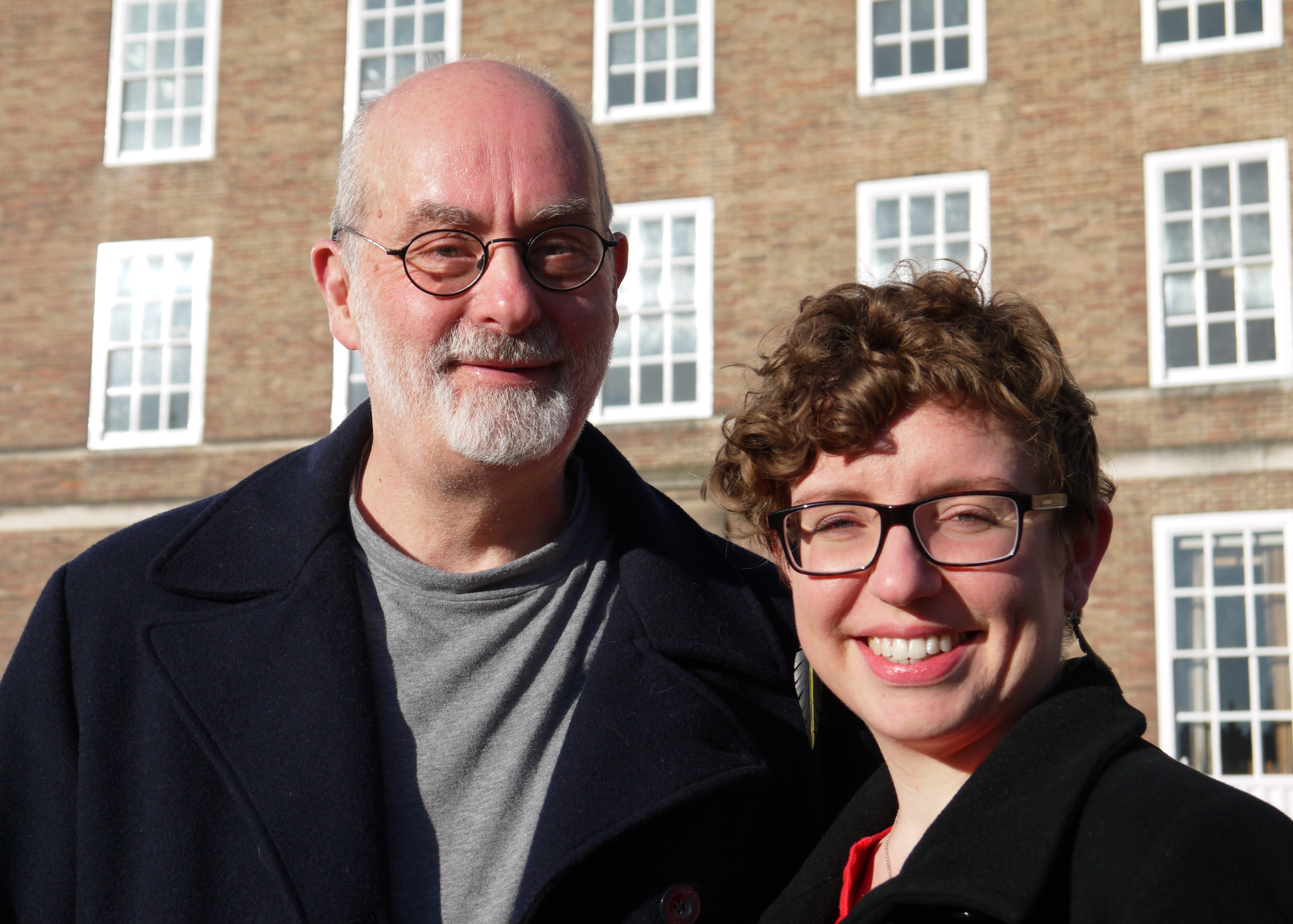
Denyer with fellow Green councillor Clive Stevens in 2016

In 2018, Denyer proposed a successful motion to bring about Bristol City Council's declaration of a climate emergency. This was the first such declaration by a UK council, and one of the first in the world. Denyer has been seen as a key figure in launching a movement of government climate-emergency declarations. BBC news credited Denyer with the idea of first putting forward 'the idea of a local area declaring a climate emergency'. Denyer's motion was described in The Independent as "the historic first motion" which by July 2019 had been "copied by more than 400 local authorities and parliament".

As of 2019, Denyer remained critical of Bristol's progress towards achieving its goal, and particularly of the planned expansion of Bristol Airport. She criticised the UK government's lack of support for environmental policies, noting that the political will existed in local government. In 2020, she welcomed Bristol's declaration of an ecological emergency due to loss of wildlife.

Denyer also campaigned extensively on transport; work included trying to introduce congestion charging to Bristol and seeking 'a major upgrade of Bristol's transport, with safe connected cycling routes, a joined up and efficient bus network and a levy on corporate parking to raise funds for more improvements'. In June 2021, she criticised Bristol Airport for claiming to be on course to be carbon neutral without taking emissions from flights, travel to and from the airport, or car parking into account. In 2020, she helped institute a Green Party policy to ban advertisements for polluting products such as SUVs and flights, and pushed for a similar policy in advertising controlled by Bristol City Council.

Her other campaigning has included improving conditions for people renting their homes, and opposing council tax increases for poorer taxpayers while seeking what Denyer has described as "more ambition from the mayor's office in tackling austerity" by calling for the city to raise the top band of council tax.

=== European and UK Parliament candidacies ===
In May 2019, Denyer unsuccessfully stood as one of the Green candidates for South West England in the European Parliament Election. The elections saw her refusing to share a platform with the UKIP candidate Carl Benjamin regarding a hustings planned to be held at the University of Bristol, arguing that "while the protection of free speech is important, we have to guard against the far-right taking advantage of it".

In November 2019, she stood as the Green candidate for Bristol West in the 2019 UK general election. The seat was seen as a target for the Green Party. The Greens participated in the Unite to Remain campaign, leading to discussion as to whether she or the standing Labour MP Thangam Debbonaire was the more convincing candidate for pro-EU voters. Denyer argued that polls predicting that Debbonaire would receive 60% of the vote didn't take into account the Liberal Democrats standing down in favour of the Greens. In the event, Denyer came second, with 24.9% of the vote to Debbonaire's 62.3%.

In June 2022, Denyer announced her intention to run for MP for Bristol West in the 2024 general election. In June 2023, Denyer began her campaign to become MP for Bristol Central, the successor constituency to Bristol West created from the 2023 Periodic Review of Westminster constituencies.

=== Co-leader of the Green Party ===
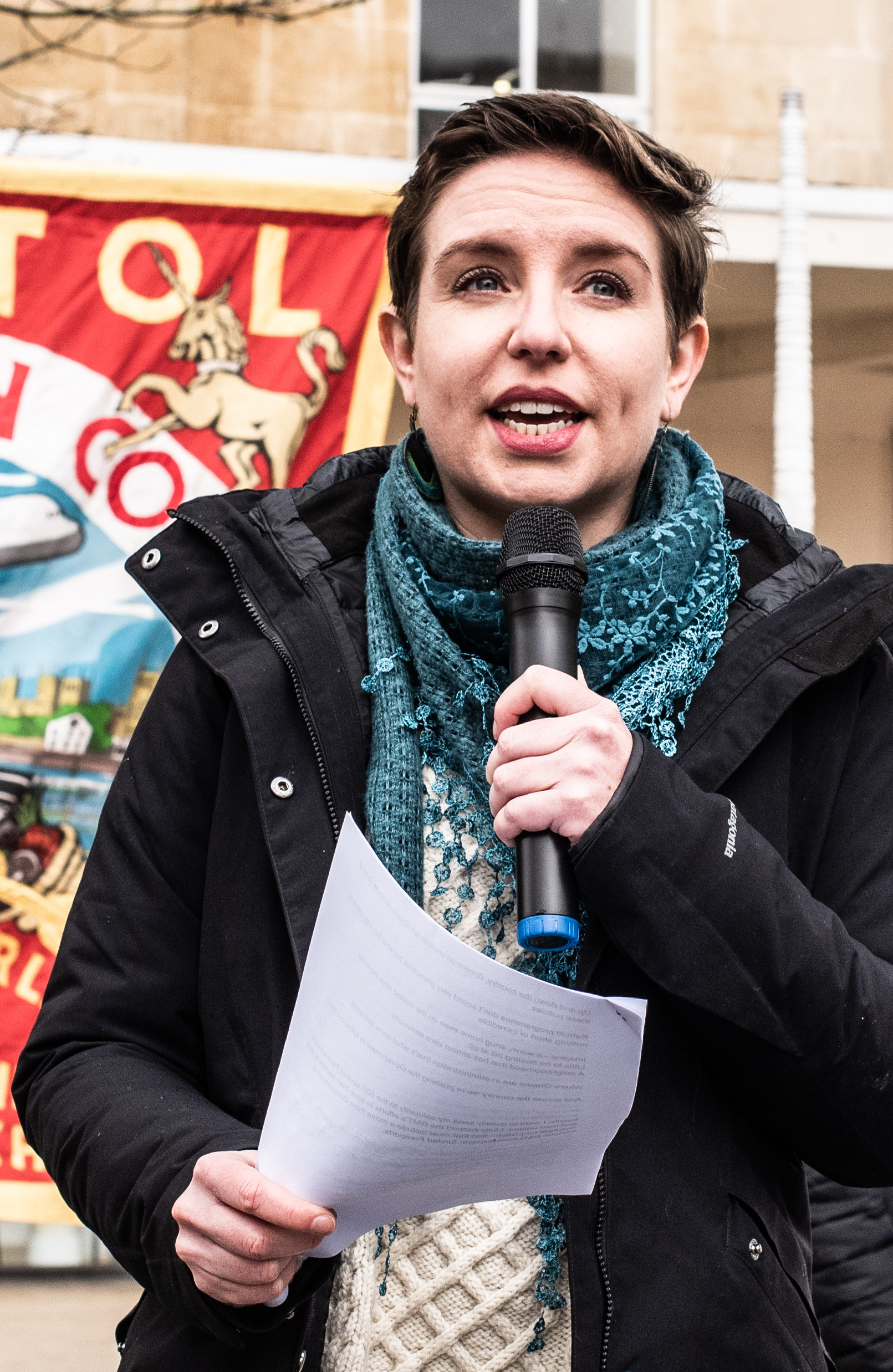
Denyer in 2022 speaking at a demonstration on the cost-of-living crisis

On 16 August 2021, Denyer announced her joint candidacy for leader of the Green Party alongside former deputy leader Adrian Ramsay on a co-leadership platform. They were both elected on 1 October 2021. Denyer became the first openly bisexual leader of a major political party in England.

Midway through the 2024 United Kingdom general election campaign, in a poll from YouGov, 53% of Green supporters did not recognise a photograph of Denyer.

In May 2025, Denyer announced her decision to not seek re-election as co-leader in the 2025 Green Party Leadership election and focus on her job as an MP.

=== Member of Parliament ===
In the 2024 general election, Denyer was elected as the Member of Parliament for Bristol Central with 24,539 votes (56.6%) and a majority of 10,407. She defeated former Labour MP for Bristol West Thangam Debbonaire. Denyer was one of four Green Party MPs elected at the 2024 general election, alongside Siân Berry, Ellie Chowns and Adrian Ramsay. It was the first general election at which the party won more than one Commons seat.

Denyer made her maiden speech on 18 July 2024 during a debate on Foreign Affairs and Defence; she opened her maiden speech by stating her preferred pronouns, in what she believed to be a parliamentary first.

Denyer was criticised in July 2024 for owning a gas boiler in her home, despite the Green Party’s strong support and lobbying for heat pumps. Denyer noted that she was in the process of installing heat pumps.

In October 2024, Denyer was appointed to the Public Bill Committee scrutinising the proposed Renter's Rights Bill.

On 22 May 2026, Denyer announced that she would be taking a leave of absence from her parliamentary responsibilities, after revealing that she had been suffering from occupational burnout.

== Awards ==
In the 2013 Travelwest Sustainable Business Travel Awards, Denyer was involved in her employer's achievement of the Best Promotional Incentive Award for encouraging staff car-sharing.

In 2019, Denyer received the UK Local Government Association's 2018–2019 Clarence Barrett Award for outstanding achievement "for her work on the Climate Emergency motion which has been carried forward by councils everywhere"; she also received a "special mention" in the Local Government Information Unit's Councillor Achievement Awards in the category "Environment and Sustainability Pioneer" and was nominated for the Bristol Diversity Awards in the politician category.

In 2020, Denyer was named in the sustainability category by the Women's Engineering Society as one of the UK's top fifty women in engineering, with the commendation focusing on her climate emergency motion, and in Bristol Live's "Pink List" of the most influential LGBT+ people in Bristol.

In 2024, the New Statesman named Denyer 50th in The Left Power List 2024, the magazine's "guide to the 50 most influential people in progressive politics".

== Personal life ==
In December 2015, Denyer stated that she is a nontheist Quaker. She is bisexual and a vegan.

Denyer captained the Durham University alumni team that won both the Christmas 2024 and 2025 Celebrity University Challenge quiz specials.

Denyer has spoken openly about her mental health, including her experience suffering from occupational burnout.

== Electoral performance ==
=== European Parliament ===
Date	Constituency	List position	List votes	% votes	Result
2019	South West England	3rd	302,364	18.1	Not elected

=== House of Commons ===
2024 general election: Bristol Central
Party	Candidate	Votes	%	±%
Green	Carla Denyer	24,539	56.6	+30.6
Labour	Thangam Debbonaire	14,132	32.6	−25.9
Conservative	Samuel Williams	1,998	4.6	−9.7
Reform	Robert Clarke	1,338	3.1	+1.9
Liberal Democrats	Nicholas Coombes	1,162	2.7	New
Party of Women	Kellie-Jay Keen	196	0.5	New
Majority		10,407	24.0	N/A
Turnout		43,365	69.1	–4.1
Registered electors		62,735		
Green gain from Labour		Swing	+28.2	

2019 general election: Bristol West
Party	Candidate	Votes	%	±%
Labour	Thangam Debbonaire	47,028	62.3	–3.6
Green	Carla Denyer	18,809	24.9	+12.0
Conservative	Suria Aujla	8,822	11.7	–2.1
Brexit Party	Neil Hipkiss	869	1.2	New
Majority		28,219	37.4	–14.7
Turnout		75,528	76.1	–1.0
Labour hold		Swing		

=== Bristol City Council ===
==== Clifton East ====
2015 Bristol City Council election: Clifton East Ward 2015
Party	Candidate	Votes	%	±%
Green	Carla Suzanne Denyer	1,945	32.16	+16.63
Conservative	Sarah Helen Cleave	1,684	27.84	–5.81
Liberal Democrats	Christian Adam Martin	1,243	20.55	–14.13
Labour	Kerry Barker	1,019	16.85	+0.72
Independents for Bristol	Christine Townsend	122	2.02	N/A
TUSC	Ian Quick	35	0.58	N/A
Majority		261	4.32	+3.29
Green gain from Liberal Democrats		Swing	+11.22	

==== Clifton Down ====
2016 Bristol City Council election: Clifton Down (2 seats)
Party	Candidate	Votes	%	±%
Green	Carla Denyer	1,255	33.43	
Green	Clive Stevens	1,001	26.66	
Labour	Philip Jardine	991	26.40	
Conservative	Sarah Cleave	775	20.64	
Labour	Satnam Singh*	766	20.40	
Liberal Democrats	Tom Stubbs	673	17.93	
Conservative	Steve Smith	665	17.71	
Liberal Democrats	Joshua Warwick-Smith	606	16.14	
Independent	Dawn Parry	273	7.27	
Turnout		3,754	47.49	
Green win (new seat)				
Green win (new seat)				

2021 Bristol City Council election: Clifton Down (2 seats)
Party	Candidate	Votes	%	±%
Green	Carla Suzanne Denyer	2,458	60.26	+26.83
Green	Tom Hathway	1,752	42.95	+16.29
Labour	Elliott Jacob Callender	880	21.57	–4.83
Labour	Teresa Ann Stratford	654	16.03	–4.37
Conservative	Jude Fabio D'Alesio	449	11.01	–9.63
Liberal Democrats	Merche Clark	445	10.91	–7.02
Liberal Democrats	Laura Kirsten Barry	428	10.49	–5.65
Conservative	Edward Alexander De'Mayene Gibson	397	9.73	–7.98
Turnout		4,079	46.09	–1.40
Green hold				
Green hold				

=== Co-leader of the Green Party ===
Date	Votes	% votes	Place
2021	6,274 (second round)	61.7 (second round)	Elected (stood on a joint co-leadership ticket with Adrian Ramsay)

Party political offices
Preceded by Siân Berry; Jonathan Bartley	Leader of the Green Party of England and Wales; 2021–2025; With: Adrian Ramsay (2021–2025)	Succeeded by Zack Polanski
Parliament of the United Kingdom
New constituency	Member of Parliament for Bristol Central; 2024–present	Incumbent
