= The Lido, Bristol =

Outdoor swimming pool in Bristol, England

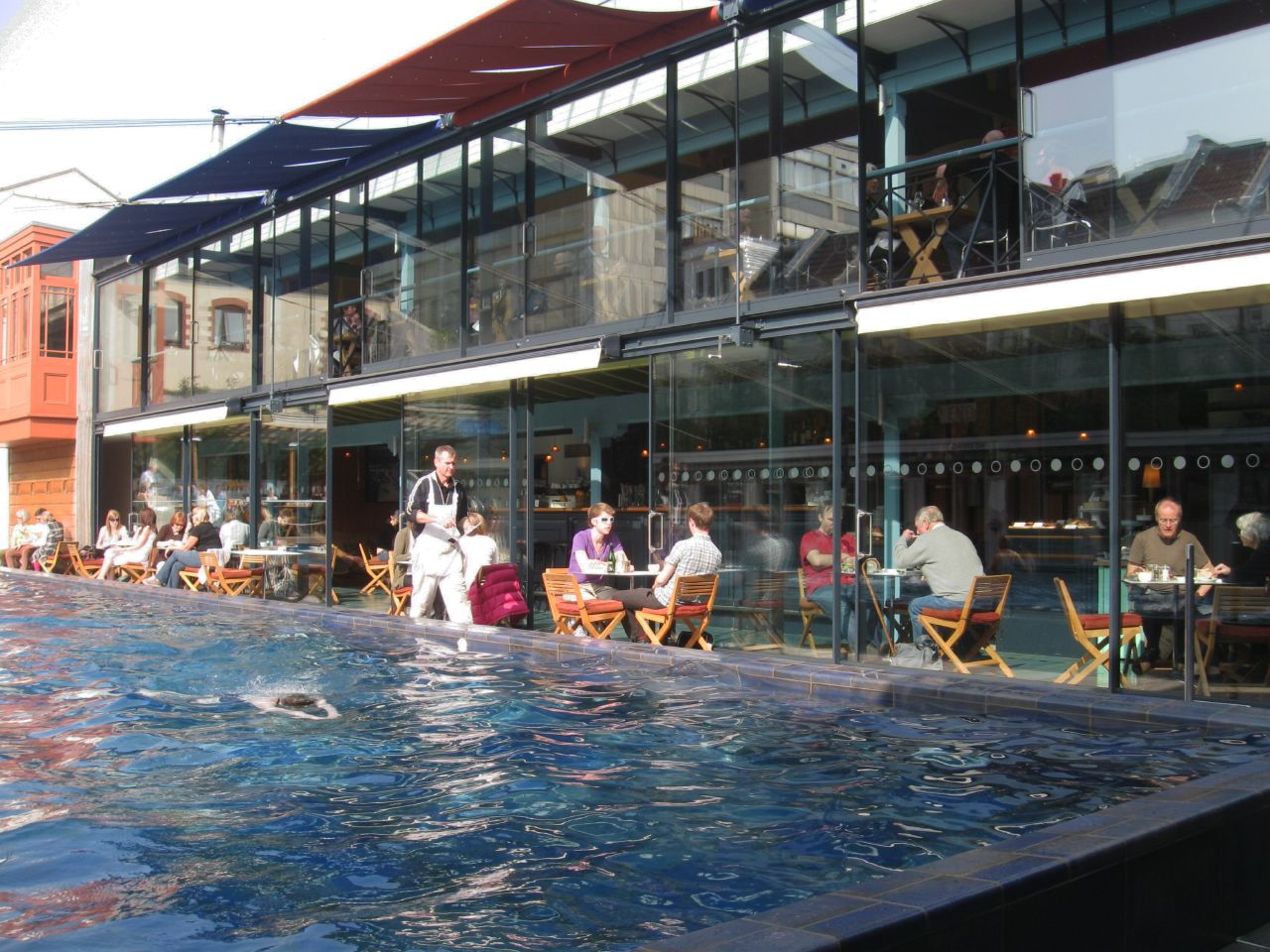
- The Lido in 2011

- Location within Bristol

General information
- Location: Whiteladies Road, Clifton, Bristol, England
- Coordinates: 51.45889°N 2.61168°W
- Year built: 1849
- Opened: 29 July 1850

Listed Building – Grade II*
- Official name: The Clifton Pool and The Victoria Public House
- Designated: 12 June 1998
- Reference no.: 1323692

The Lido, Bristol (grid reference ST576735) is a historic lido situated in Oakfield Place in the Whiteladies Road area of Clifton, Bristol, England. Originally opened in 1850, the pool eventually fell into disrepair and was closed in 1990. Despite being considered for demolition, the building was given Grade II* listed building status in 1998. It was purchased by the Bristol Glass Boat Company who restored the pool, for its reopening in November 2008.

== History ==
The Lido was originally built in 1849 and opened on 29 July 1850 under the name Clifton Victoria Baths. The building frontage is in a classical style, originally housing the medicinal baths, offices and the boiler room. Behind the main building is a rectangular 250-square-metre (2,700 sq ft) swimming pool, with the entire site covering a total of 885 square metres (9,530 sq ft).

The central doorway is in an Egyptian style, with an additional doorway added in 1867 for The Victoria public house, which occupies part of the site. The pool has galleries on two sides, built in cast iron over two floors. On the third side there is a row of cubicles, canopied and with wooden panelled fronts. The pool itself is heated, the oldest surviving heated pool in the country.

== Closure and restoration ==
The pool had fallen into significant disrepair by 1990 when it was closed to the public, and was considered for demolition. However, the Lido and accompanying public house were designated Grade II* listed building status on 12 June 1998 and are set in a conservation area.

In 2005 it was acquired by the Bristol Glass Boat Company, who restored the pool with the addition of substantial spa facilities with saunas and other treatment rooms and built a restaurant and café. It reopened in November 2008 as The Lido, Bristol. The pool is kept at 24 °C, and the building offers spa treatments and massages. Priority is given to members, meaning day visitors are turned away at busy times.

== Gallery ==
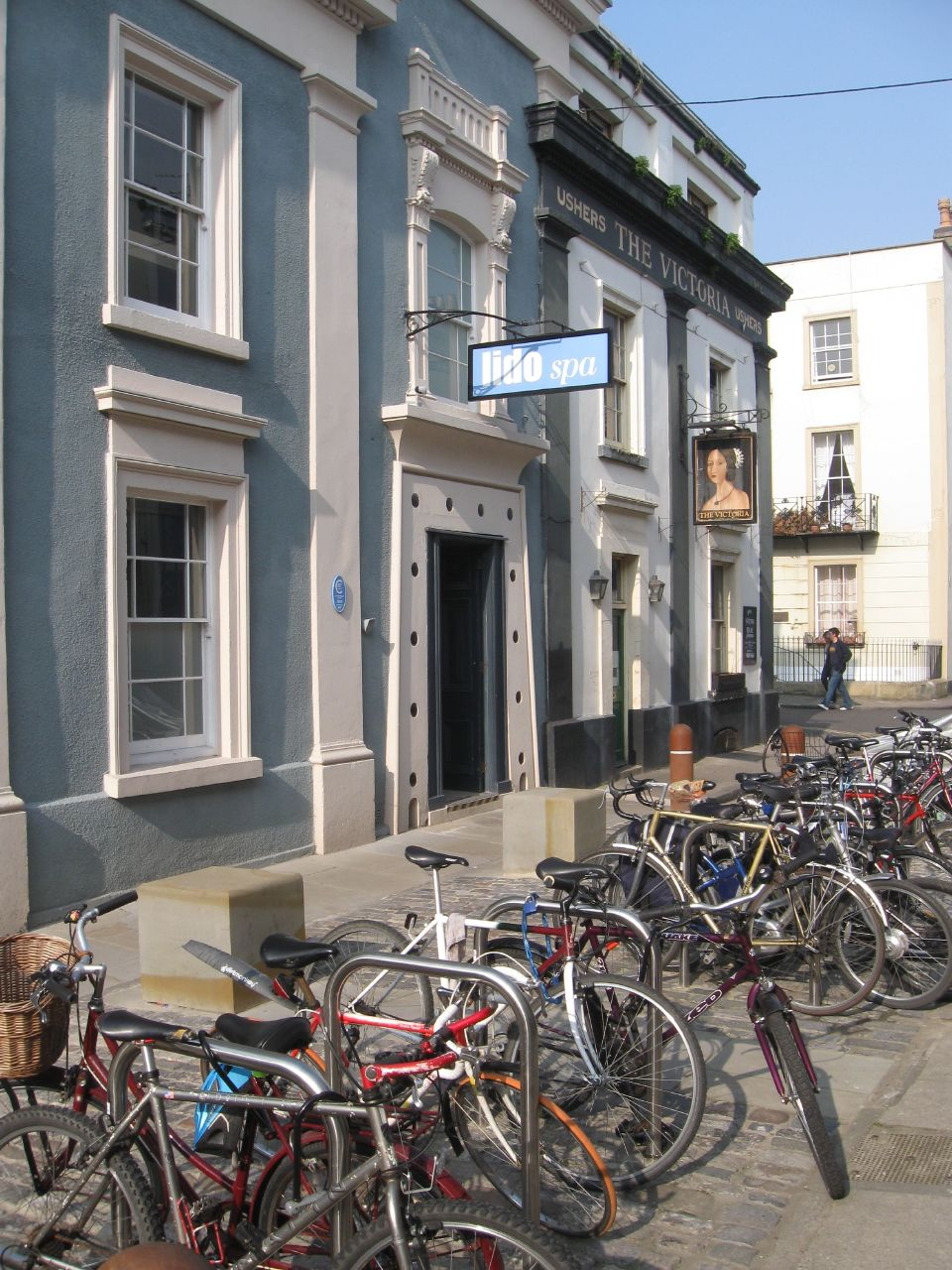
Exterior

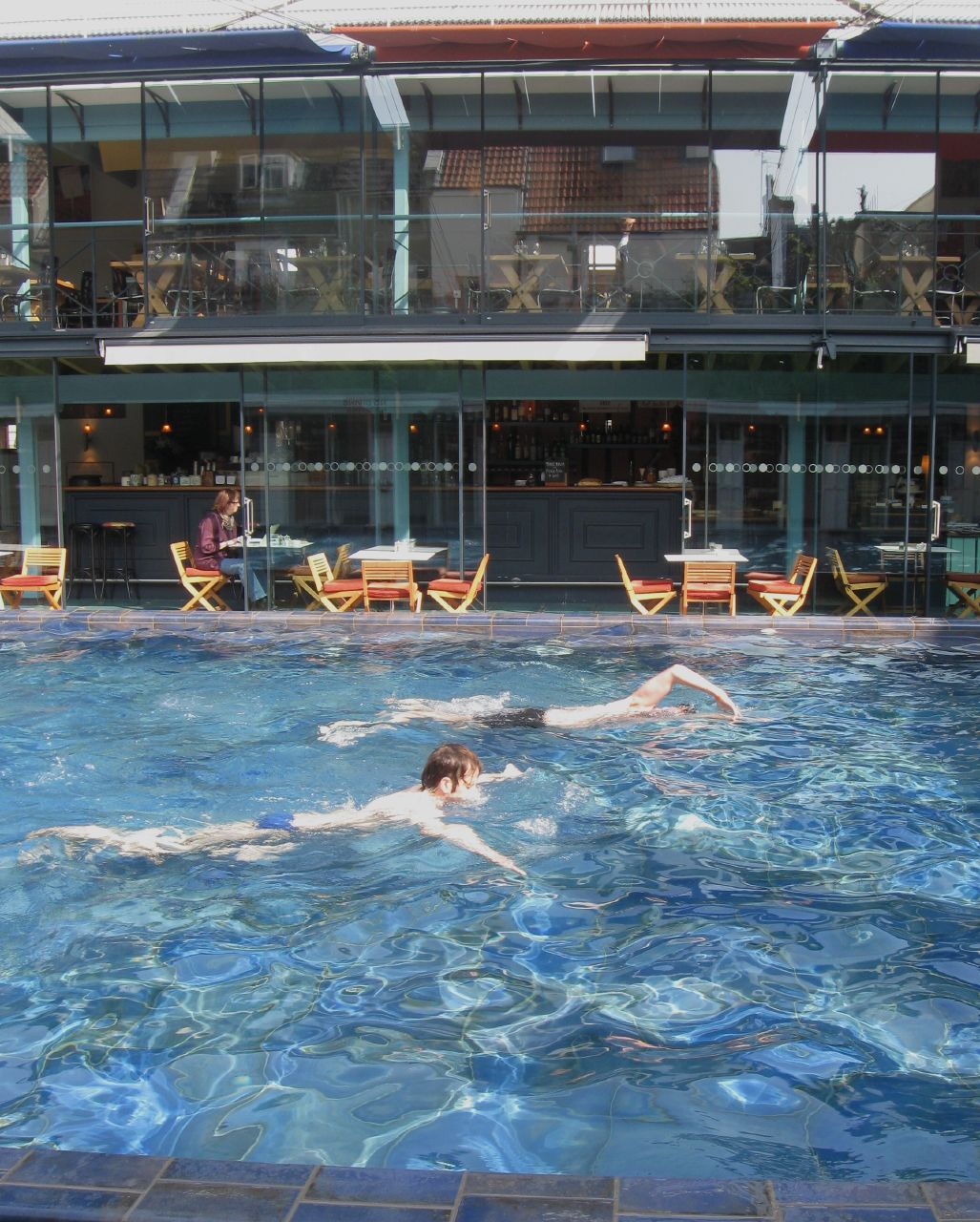
Pool sideways

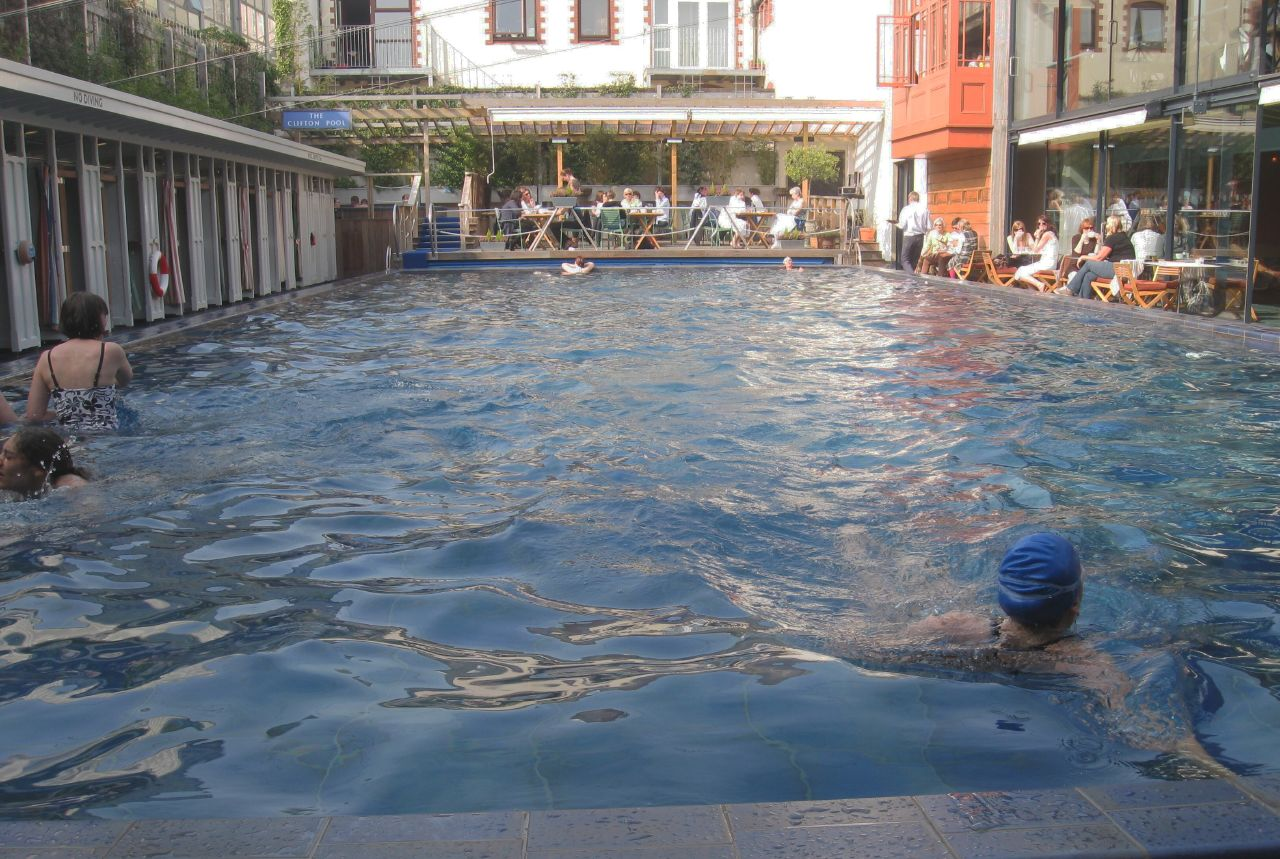
Pool lengthways

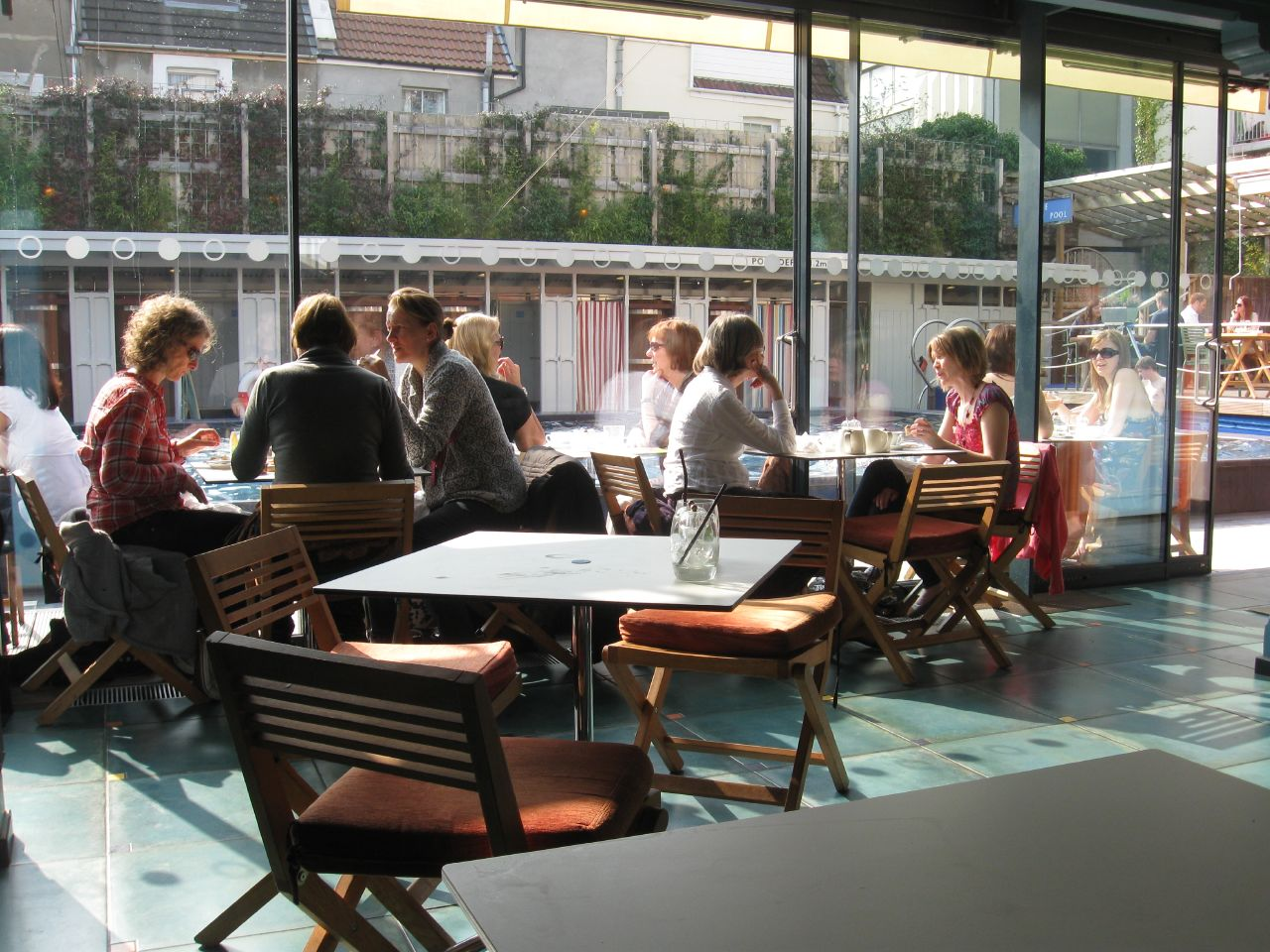
Cafe

== See also ==
- Grade II* listed buildings in Bristol
