= These Foolish Things (film) =

- Directed by: Julia Taylor-Stanley
- Written by: Julia Taylor-Stanley
- Based on: There's a Porpoise Close Behind Us by Noel Langley
- Produced by: Paul Sarony; Julia Taylor-Stanley
- Starring: Zoë Tapper; David Leon; Lauren Bacall; Anjelica Huston; Terence Stamp; Andrew Lincoln; Eve Myles; Jamie Glover; Julia McKenzie
- Cinematography: Gavin Finney
- Edited by: David Martin
- Music by: Ian Lynn
- Distributed by: Swipe Films
- Release date: 10 March 2006
- Running time: 107 minutes
- Country: United Kingdom
- Language: English

These Foolish Things is a 2006 British romantic drama film directed by Julia Taylor-Stanley and starring Zoë Tapper, David Leon, Lauren Bacall, Anjelica Huston, Terence Stamp, Andrew Lincoln, Eve Myles, Jamie Glover and Julia McKenzie. It is based on Noel Langley's 1936 novel There's a Porpoise Close Behind Us.

== Premise ==
Set in 1930s England, a struggling young actress, a fledgling director and an ambitious playwright become embroiled in an emotional love triangle as they strive for recognition, fame and fortune in a world on the brink of World War II.

== Cast ==
- Zoë Tapper as Diana Shaw
- Anjelica Huston as Lottie Osgood
- David Leon as Robin Gardner
- Lauren Bacall as Dame Lydia
- Terence Stamp as Baker
- Andrew Lincoln as Christopher Lovell
- Eve Myles as Dolly Nightingale
- Jamie Glover as Everard
- Julia McKenzie as Miss Abernethy

== Production ==
The drama was largely filmed on location in Bristol, Cheltenham and surrounding areas of Gloucestershire.

== Reception ==
The film received generally poor ratings. In a 2006 review for The Guardian Philip French called the movie "a turgid romantic comedy" and an "embarrassing affair". A review for the BBC called it "A romance so old-fashioned that audiences will be checking not just their watches but their calendars, These Foolish Things is a well made but achingly square drama."
