= David Leon =

English actor (born 1980)

- Born: David Jeremy Leon; 24 July 1980 (age 46); Newcastle upon Tyne, England
- Occupations: Actor, director, writer, producer
- Years active: 2004–present

David Jeremy Leon (born 24 July 1980) is an English actor, director, writer and producer. As an actor, he is known for appearing in Rankin and Chris Cottam's 2002 feature film, Lives of the Saints (as the character Othello), and director Guy Ritchie's 2008 feature, RocknRolla, as Malcolm. From 2011 to 2014, Leon co-starred with Brenda Blethyn in the ITV detective series Vera. He returned to the series in 2024.

Leon's directorial debut, the 2010 short, Man and Boy, co-directed with Marcus McSweeney, won the award for best narrative short at the Tribeca Film Festival. His next short film, the 2012 Orthodox, an entry in the 58th BFI's London Film Festival, led to his first feature-length film of the same name, which was released in 2015.

== Early life and education ==
Leon was born on 24 July 1980 in Newcastle upon Tyne, England, where his mother, Ann J. Brown, was a secretary and his father, Anthony N. Leon, worked in a power station. He is Jewish on his father's side and describes himself as half-Jewish. He briefly played for Blackburn Rovers. He is a graduate of the National Youth Theatre. He was educated at Dame Allan's School.

== Career ==
=== Acting and presenting ===
In 2002, Leon worked as a presenter on CITV. He dropped out of drama school in 2004 to shoot the film Alexander with Oliver Stone in Morocco. From 2004–2005, he acted in 12 episodes of the TV series, Cutting It, playing the character Troy Gillespie. In 2006, Leon's acting roles included the film These Foolish Things, which also starred Lauren Bacall, Anjelica Huston, Terence Stamp, and Zoë Tapper, and in 2007 he played Billy the Kid in the BBC's mini series The Wild West. In 2010 he played the theatrical role of Jesus in Mark Haddon's play Polar Bears at the Donmar Warehouse.

From 2011 to 2014, he played DS Joe Ashworth in the ITV detective series Vera alongside Brenda Blethyn. On 30 March 2023, it was confirmed that Leon would reprise his role as Joe Ashworth after a decade away from the series. He returned as the character, promoted to DI, in the first episode of series 13, called Fast Love.

=== Writing and directing ===
Leon wrote and co-directed the short film, Father, with Marcus McSweeney, premiering in 2009. The next year, the same team premiered the short, Man and Boy, which was entered in film festivals, including the Tribeca.

Orthodox, Leon's third short film as writer/director, was accepted into several international festivals including the 58th BFI London Film Festival. The feature-length version of Orthodox was completed in 2015.

== Awards and recognition ==
Leon's and McSweeney's 2010 Man and Boy won the award for the best narrative short at that year's Tribeca Film Festival.

== Filmography ==
=== As actor in film and television ===
- 2004: Alexander as Hermolaous
- 2004–2005: Cutting It as Troy Gillespie (TV series) - 12 episodes
- 2005: Boy Eats Girl as Nathan
- 2006: These Foolish Things as Robin Gardner
- 2006: The Wild West as Billy the Kid (TV mini-series)
- 2006: The Lives of the Saints as Othello
- 2006: Strictly Confidential as Jeff (TV series) - 1 episode
- 2007: Clapham Junction as Alfie Cartwright (TV one-off Drama)
- 2008: Love Me Still as Freddie
- 2008: RocknRolla as Malcolm
- 2010: Coming Up as Dan (TV series) - 1 episode
- 2011–2014, 2024-2025: Vera as DS/DI Joe Ashworth (TV series) - 21 episodes (Series 1-4, 13-14)
- 2012: The Glass House as Lajos
- 2013: Walking with the Enemy
- 2013: Grace and Danger as Cifaretto
- 2014: The Refugees as Álex
- 2017: In The Dark BBC TV Drama as DI Adam Perrin
- 2019: Gold Digger as Kieran

=== As actor in theatre ===
- 2010: Polar Bears as Jesus

=== As director ===
- 2009: Father (short) (co-director with Marcus McSweeney)
- 2010: Man and Boy (short) (co-director with Marcus McSweeney)
- 2012: Orthodox (short)
- 2016: Orthodox (feature)
- 2017: Vera

=== As producer ===
- 2009: Father (short)
- 2010: Man and Boy (short)
- 2012: Orthodox (short)
- 2016: Orthodox (feature)
