= Whiteladies Picture House =

Cinema in Clifton, Bristol, England

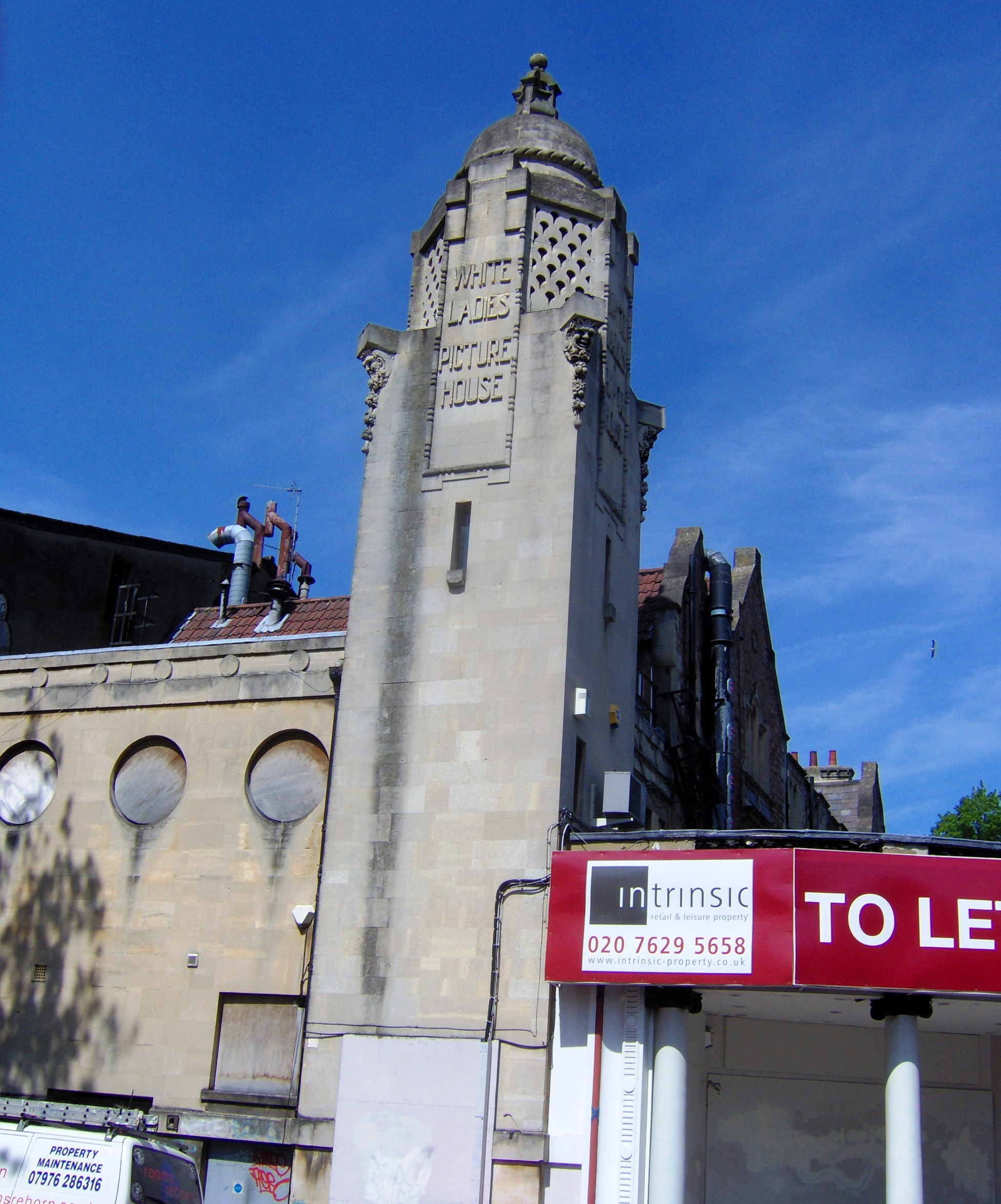
- Whiteladies Picture House

- Location within Bristol
- Former names: ABC Cinemas; Cannon Cinemas; MGM Cinemas
- Location: Bristol, England
- Coordinates: 51.4652°N 2.6117°W
- Operator: Everyman Cinemas
- Type: Cinema

Construction
- Groundbreaking: 1920
- Built: 1921
- Opened: 29 November 1921
- Architects: James Henry LaTrobe and Thomas Henry Weston

The Whiteladies Picture House (grid reference ST576742) is a cinema on Whiteladies Road in Clifton, Bristol, England.

It was built in 1920–1921 by James Henry LaTrobe and Thomas Harry Weston (1870–1923) and opened by the Duchess of Beaufort on 29 November 1921. It formerly had a ballroom, billiard room and restaurant but in 1978, it became a three-screen cinema rather than having a single screen.

As part of the ABC chain, the cinema was eventually absorbed by Odeon, in a merger undertaken by the private equity firm Cinven. With another Odeon nearby on Broadmead's Union Street, the decision was taken to close down and sell the Whiteladies in 2001 with a restrictive covenant forbidding its future use as a cinema.

The cinema has been designated by English Heritage as a grade II listed building. While the front section of the building has been divided off to create a restaurant, the majority of the building, including the main auditorium, balcony and ballroom, remained empty since its closure in 2001 until its reopening in 2016.

The building was allowed to deteriorate and was on Bristol City Council's "at Risk" register, deeming it to be in danger of being lost due to lack of use, under-use, disrepair, or dereliction. Several plans were put forward to redevelop the building. The most recent planning application to convert the building into a gym and flats was rejected by Bristol City Council, went to appeal and was finally defeated in March 2013.

In November 2010 a not-for-profit company, Whiteladies Picture House Ltd, was set up by Alan Mandel Butler and David Fells (manager of the local Redgrave Theatre) to raise awareness of the building and its history and to begin the journey of raising the necessary capital to reopen the Picture House as a mixed-use venue with a 450-seat theatre and a 200-seat cinema.

The company reached out to the local community to aid in its campaign and were instrumental in blocking the planning application to convert the building into a gym and flats and bringing the building back into the public eye. In 2013, Alan Mandel Butler left the company to pursue other projects and David Fells began working with Jonathan Lees Architects to develop plans to preserve the existing historic fabric of the building, including the original Art Deco auditorium.

It is currently operated by Everyman Cinemas. It is the company's first branch in Bristol and it opened on 20 May 2016. The redevelopment also includes five new flats on the upper floor, where the ballroom and billiards room used to be.

In May 2022, the cinema closed for expansion into the former restaurant next door. It reopened in June with a larger foyer and a fourth, 37-seat screen.

== Equipment ==
Prior to 1956 the cinema was equipped with Ross 35mm Projectors. These projectors were originally designed as silent with add-on sound units that were located between the projector and the lower spool-box, added later. Two types were available at the time of the talkies, Westrex and RCA models.

The auditorium and projection room were modified to accommodate the arrival of the 70mm Todd_AO film format in time for the screening of Oklahoma, released in December 1956. The modifications to the projection room included enlarging the area into the rear of the circle so as to accommodate the new Phillips DP70- AAII projectors, the accompanying Mole-Richardson arclamps, Westinghouse Rectifiers and Phillips surround sound per-amplifiers. The MR arclamps only being used for 70mm presentations due to the need for greater light coverage on the larger screen area. For 35mm presentations, on a smaller area of the screen, the MR arclamps were swapped to the more reliable, more efficient Peerless Magnarcs.

Besides the alterations to the rear of the circle for the enlargement of the projection room, the circle was also extended toward the screen to increase audience capacity. The proscenium arch was also moved into the auditorium to increase the backstage area to house the 5 surround sound loudspeakers and the 43feet wide screen. Also housed backstage were the motors to drive the adjustable black cloth screen-masking and the Phillips surround sound main-amplifiers. Some other alterations were made to improve access and exits in line with changes to increased seating.

The projection equipment removed prior to the installation of the Phillips DP70 was reinstalled at the Associated British Cinema ‘The Kings’ in Old Market St. In 1966 the Phillips DP70 projectors and the Mole-Richardson arclamps were removed and reinstalled at the Associated British Cinema at New Bristol Centre cinema Frogmore St. New 35mm only Phillips FP20 projectors equipped with both optical and magnetic soundtrack capabilities replaced the dual 70mm / 35mm equipment that had been moved to Frogmore St.
