= Whiteladies Road =

Road in Bristol

Coordinates: 51.466°N 2.611°W

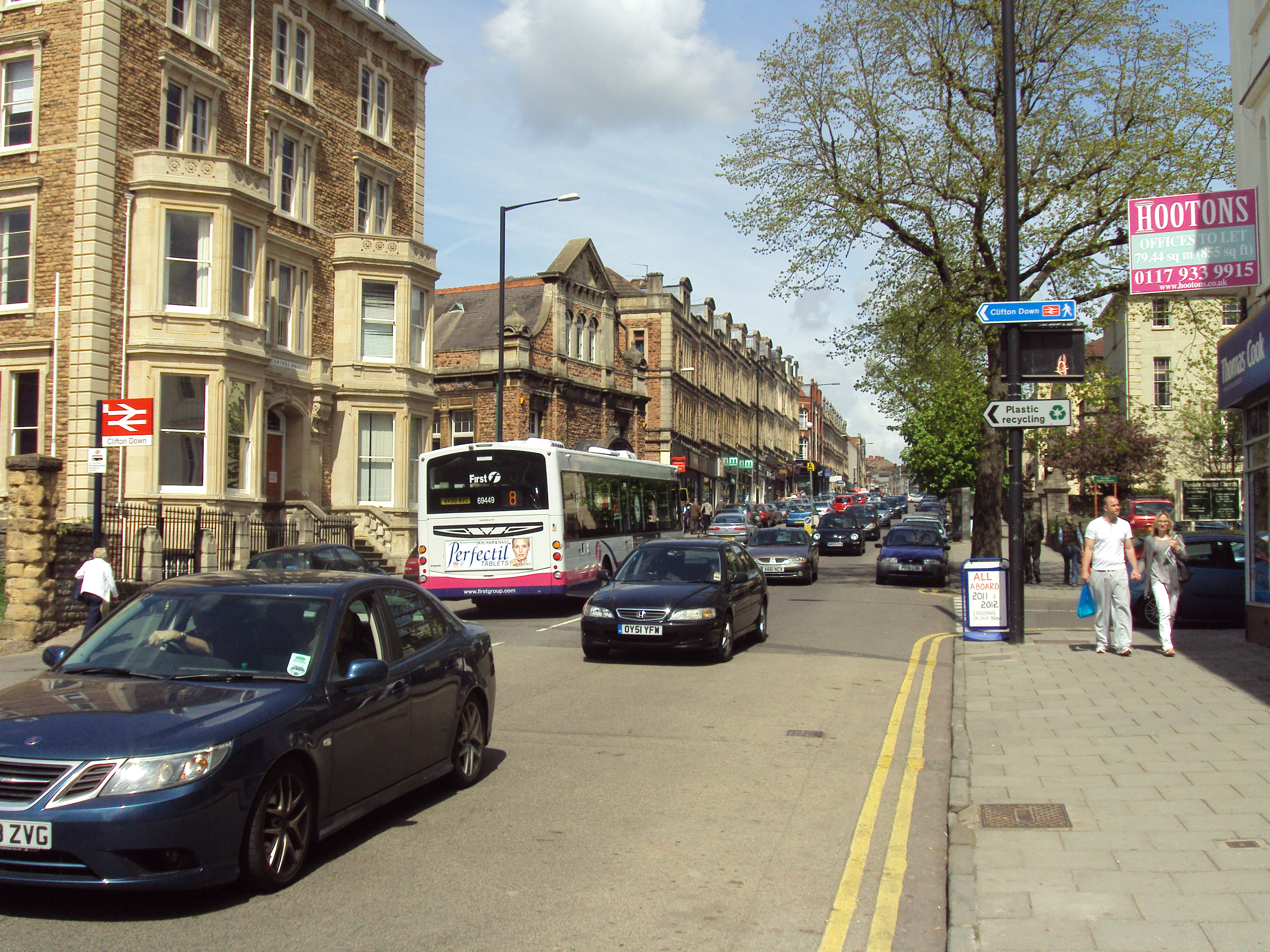
Typical traffic and buildings along Whiteladies Road

Whiteladies Road is a main road in Bristol, England. It runs north from the Victoria Rooms to Durdham Down, and separates Clifton on the west side from Redland and Cotham on the east. It forms part of the A4018.

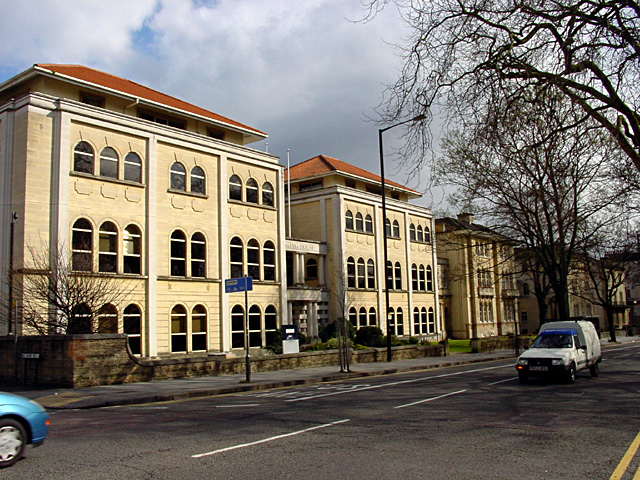
Broadcasting House

Significant buildings on Whiteladies Road include (from south to north):

- Broadcasting House, offices and studios of the British Broadcasting Corporation;
- the Whiteladies Picture House;
- Clifton Down railway station;
- Tyndale Baptist Church.

Historically, the part of the road north of Whiteladies Gate (at the junction with Cotham Hill) was the main route from the north west into Bristol, including the through route towards London and Bath from New Passage where there was a ferry from Wales. Later it was also the route into Bristol and onwards from the Port at Avonmouth. The road was extended in the early 1800s with the building of the road south of Whiteladies Gate, and the route continued down Park Street. The main route from Avonmouth was superseded by the building of The Portway in the 1920s. Most of the traffic from Wales was removed after the building of the Severn Crossing and M4 in the 1960s, and traffic was further reduced later by the M32; however the modern A4018 still goes along much of the same route through Bristol, and now meets the M5 at Cribbs Causeway and is today still one of the important routes into west Bristol from the motorway.

Blackboy Hill in 1912

A shopping centre has been built around Clifton Down station, and to the north of the station Whiteladies Road has long been an important shopping area and zone for restaurants and bars including Italian restaurants, Pazzo, Tapas bars Bravas, Muino and Condesa as well as health food shops and delis (Better Food, Wild Oats, Papadeli). Its proximity to Bristol University creates a vibrant student scene.

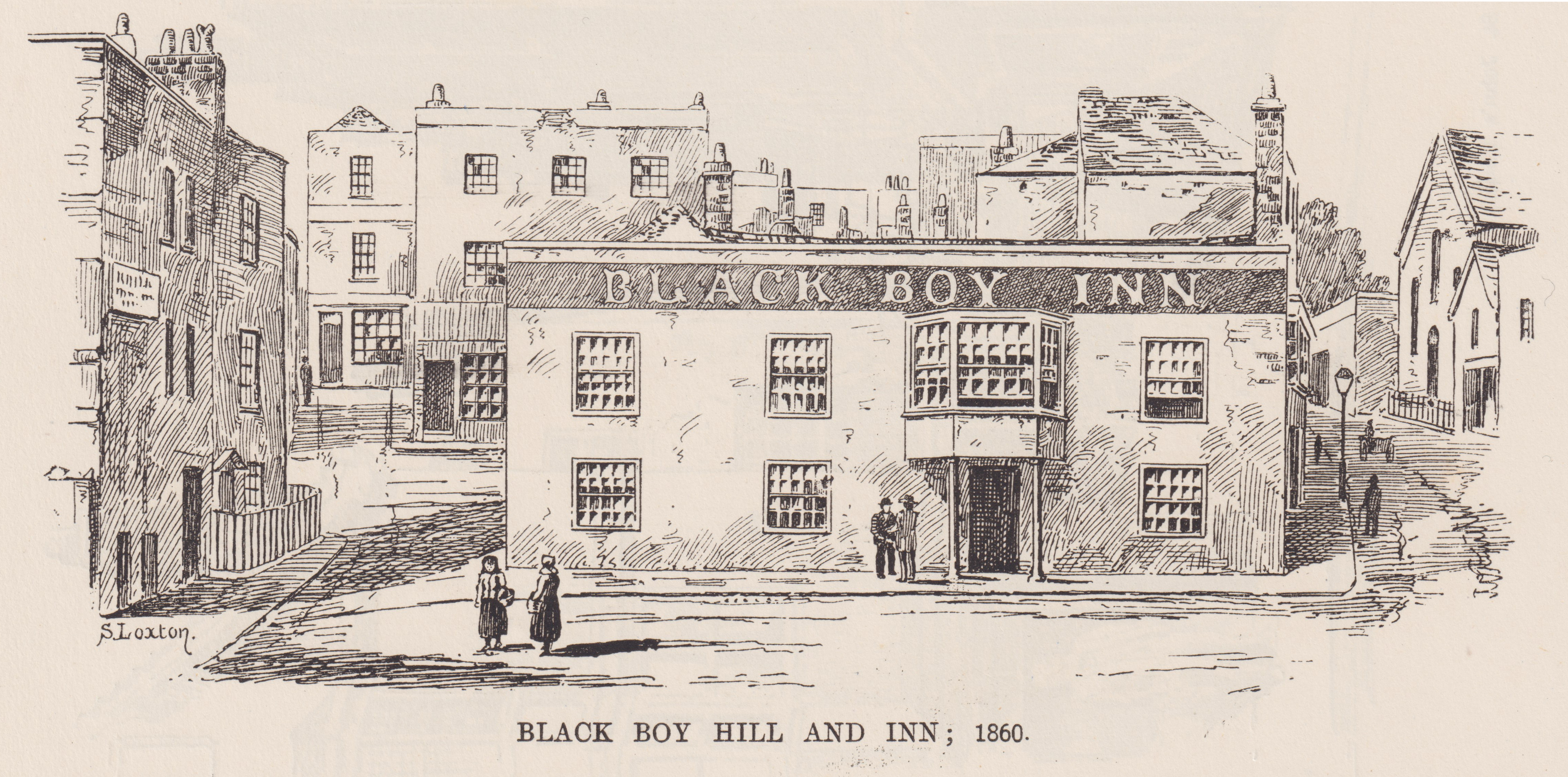
Blackboy Inn, 1860

The upper part of the road is commonly known as Blackboy Hill, named after the Black Boy Inn which stood on the hill until 1874. "Black Boy" was a common name for pubs after the Restoration. Charles II was commonly known as "the black boy" due to his black hair and the pub sign on Blackboy Hill had, until very recently, a portrait of Charles II on it. The previous name of the pub in the early 18th century, The Blackamoor's Head, does however refer to ethnicity (as a common word for black people in English at the time), and may have influenced any subsequent renaming.

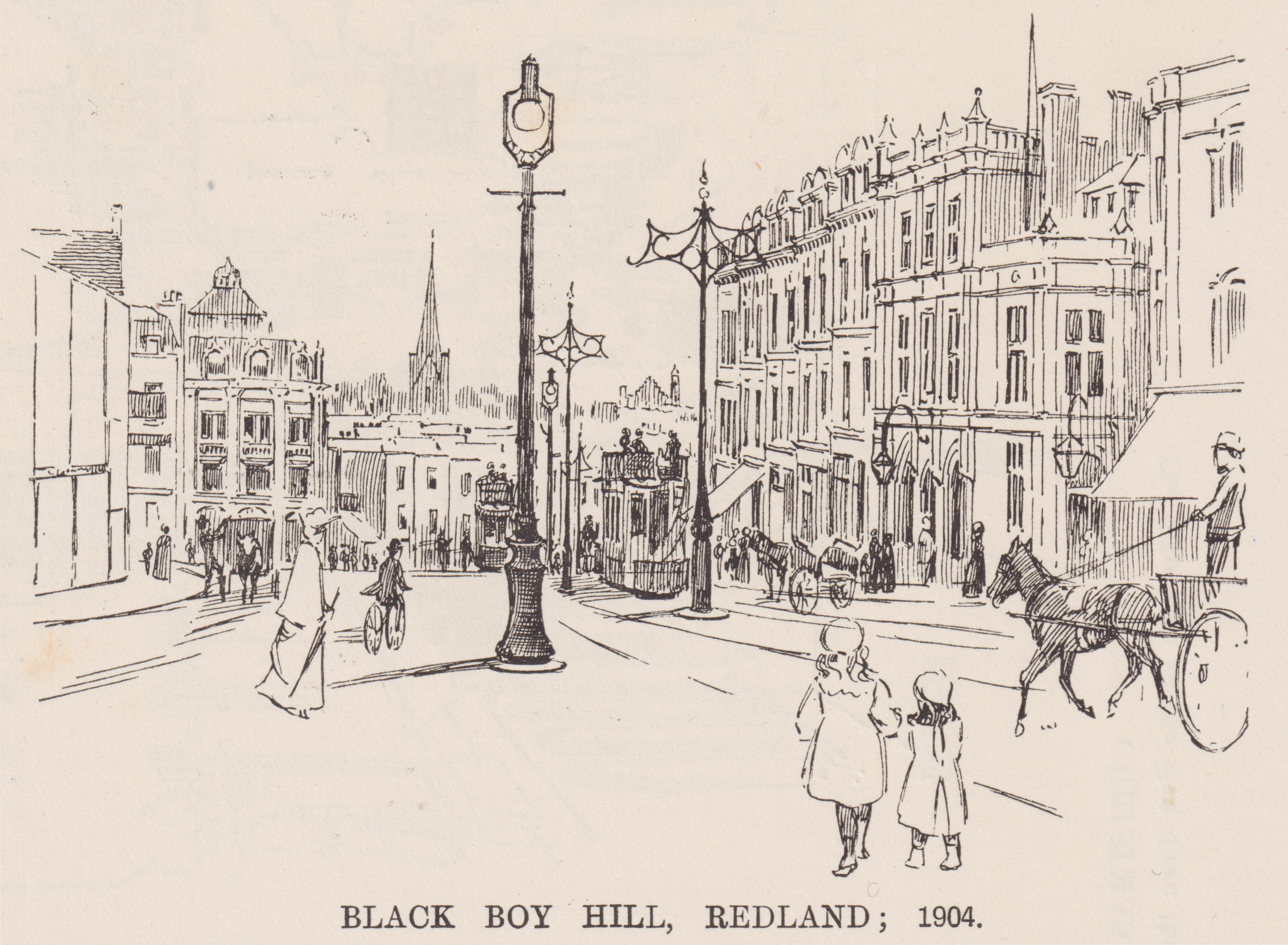
Blackboy Hill, 1904

The origin of the name of Whiteladies Road appears to be a pub, known as the White Ladies Inn, shown on maps in 1746 and 1804. There is a popular belief in Bristol that the naming of both Whiteladies Road and Blackboy Hill had connections with the slave trade. However, both names appear to be derived from pubs. A map of 1826 shows a house called White Ladies, and the road at least as far as Whiteladies Gate (near the present site of Clifton Down station) had been given its name by that time. At that time the road north of Whiteladies Gate was a turnpike leading to New Passage.
