= 2027 Green Party of England and Wales leadership election =

- TBA
Candidate	Zack Polanski
Incumbent Leader
Zack Polanski

An election for the leader of the Green Party of England and Wales will be held sometime during the summer in 2027, due to a rule in the party’s constitution that says a leadership election must be held every 2 years. The incumbent leader Zack Polanski is running for reelection.

== Background ==
According to the constitution of the Green Party of England and Wales, leadership elections take place every two years. Candidates can either put themselves forward as individuals or as a co-leadership team of two people. In the event of a single leader, the party will have two deputy leaders.

On 3 September 2026, incumbent leader Zack Polanski said he would stand in the 2026 Holborn and St Pancras by-election, triggered by the resignation of former prime minister Keir Starmer and was formally selected as the party’s candidate a week later. Polanski lost the by-election to Labour candidate Sagal Abdi-Wali, but he has said that he will not resign as leader following the loss.

== Electoral system ==
Candidates for the leader of the party may run either solo or as joint tickets of two candidates; candidates for the deputy leader position must run solo. Members running on a joint-leadership ticket must not be of the same gender.

== Candidates ==
=== Declared ===
Candidate(s)	Slogan	Political office	Announced	Campaign	Source(s)
Zack Polanski	TBA	Leader of the Green Party (2025-present) Deputy Leader of the Green Party (2022–2025) Member of the London Assembly (2021–present)	9 October 2026	TBA	

==== Zack Polanski ====
Zack Polanski has served as the leader of the Green Party since being elected to the role in 2025. He has served as a additional member of the London Assembly since 2021. Before running for leader, Polanski served as the party's deputy leader from 2022 to 2025.

In October 2026, Polanski stood in the 2026 Holborn and St Pancras by-election, he came in 2nd losing to Labour candidate Sagal Abdi-Wali. Polanski skipped a motion that would have added "Zionism is racism" in to the party policy. This was criticized by the Green leader in the House of Commons Ellie Chowns and former co-leader Adrian Ramsay. However, Polanski said he wouldn't have voted in the motion if he attended, because of how it was written. He later stated "No state has a right to exist". After the loss, multiple groups called for Polanski to resign as leader, however he said he will not.

=== Potential ===
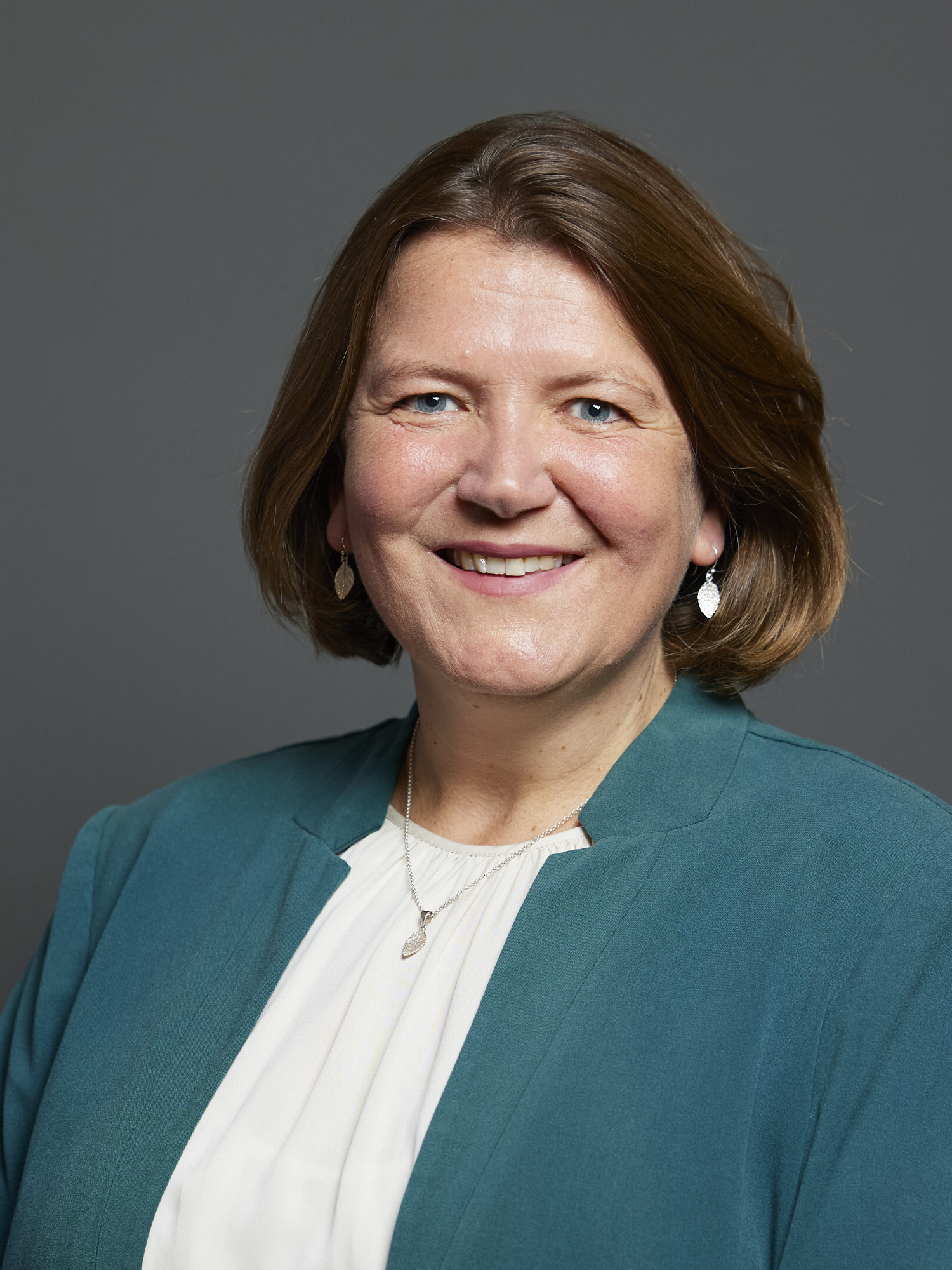
Parliamentary Leader
Ellie Chowns
MP from North Herefordshire

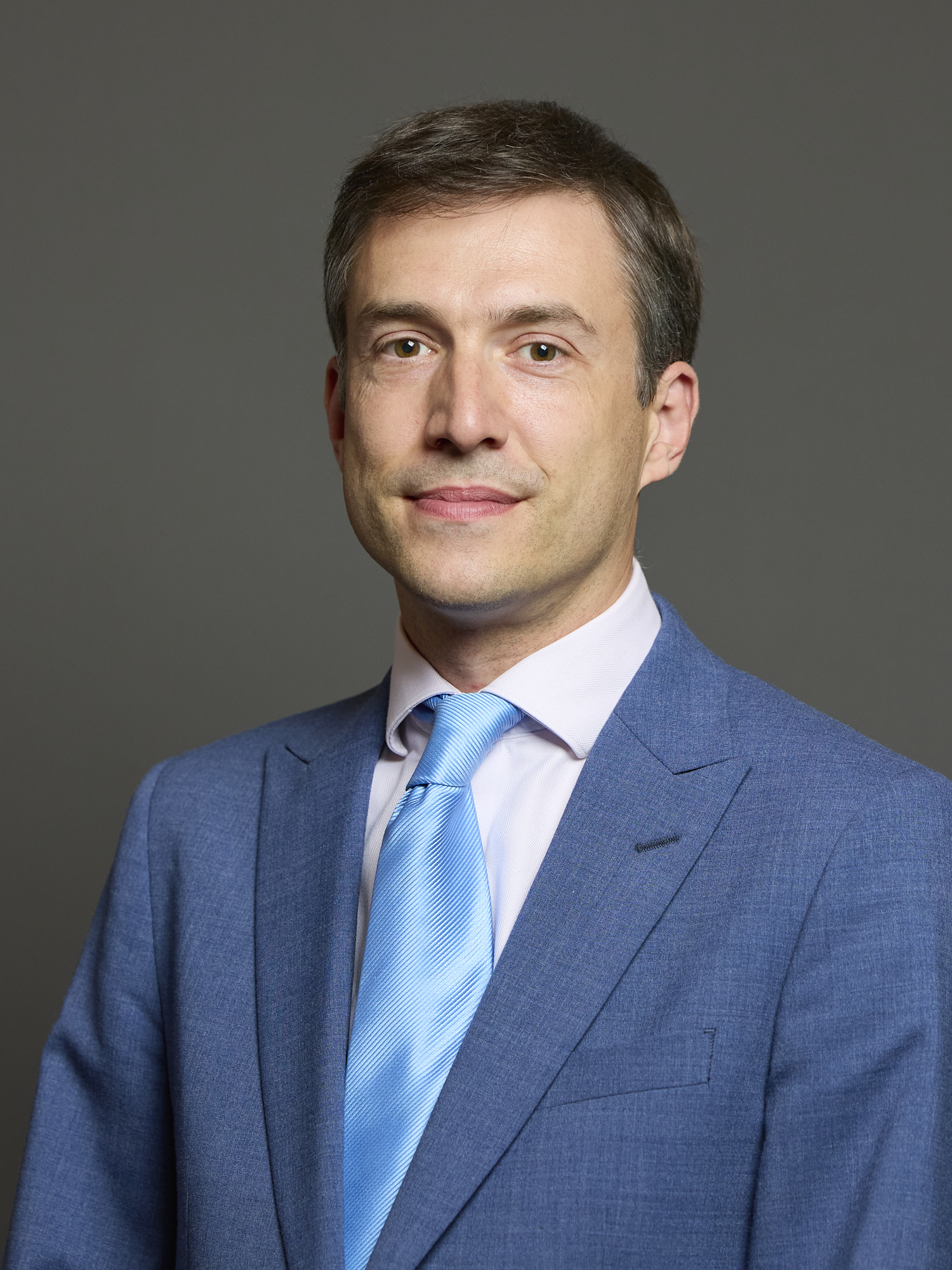
Former Co-Leader
Adrian Ramsay
MP from Waveney Valley

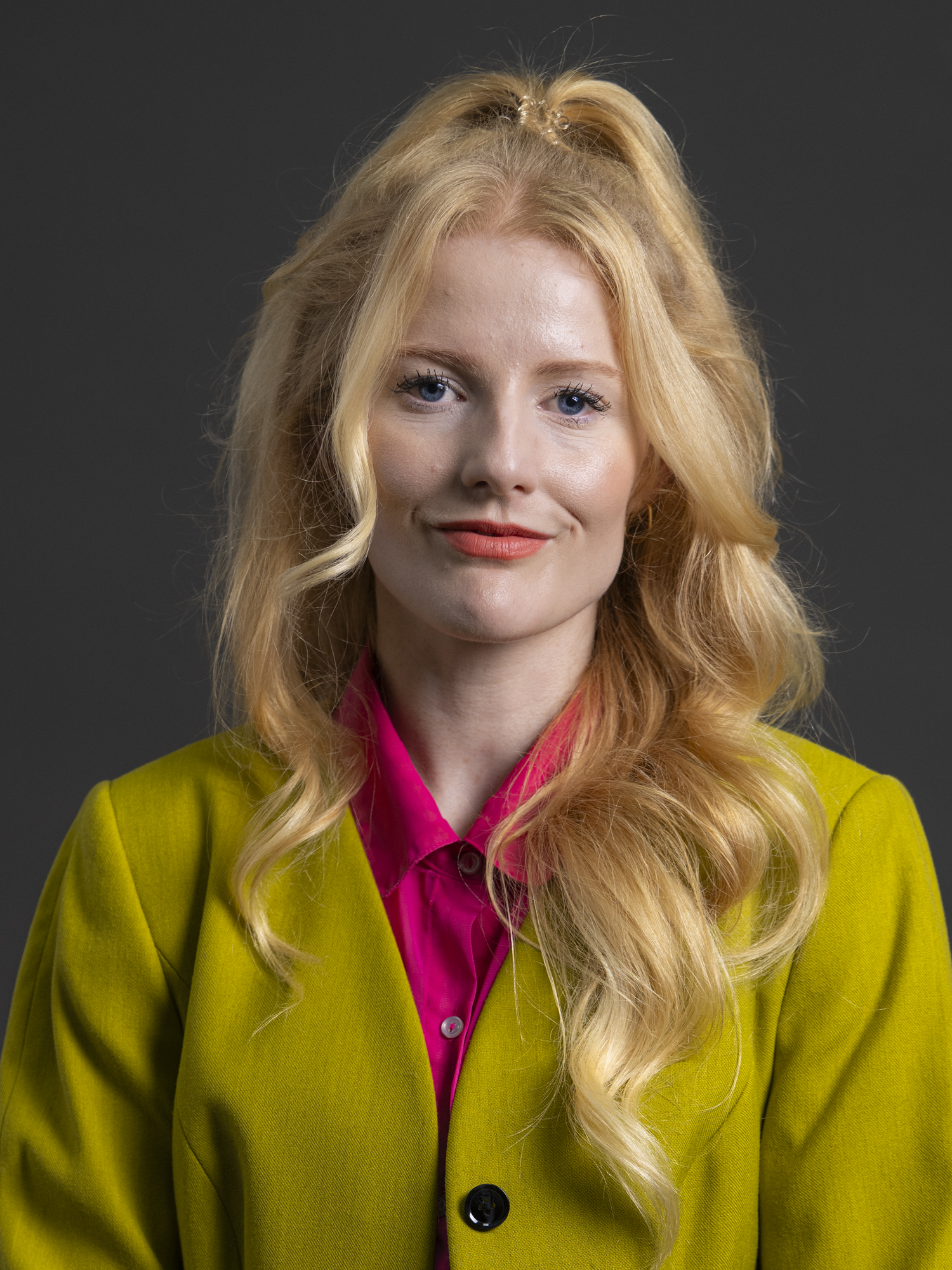
Spokesperson
Hannah Spencer
MP from Gorton and Denton

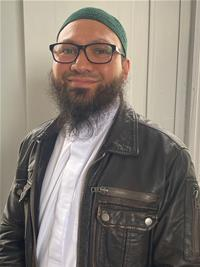
Deputy Leader
Mothin Ali
Councilor from Gipton and Harehills

==== Ellie Chowns ====
Ellie Chowns has served as the leader of the Green Party in the House of Commons following her election to the role in 2025, after Adrian Ramsay and herself lost to then-deputy leader Zack Polanski in the 2025 Green Party of England and Wales leadership election. Chowns has been serving as a Member of Parliament (MP) from North Herefordshire since 2024.

On 8 May 2025, incumbent co-leader Carla Denyer announced she would not be seeking re-election as leader in 2025 to focus on her role as a constituency MP. 3 days later on 11 May 2025, it was announced that Chowns would be running to be co-leader with the other incumbent co-leader Adrian Ramsay. On 30 August 2025, it was announced that Polanski had been elected the sole leader of the party, Chowns took role as Parliamentary leader 5 days later. Chowns has been a heavy critic about Polanski's choice to skip the motion that would have added "Zionism is racism" in to the party’s policy, saying the move was "disappointing", and that the party shouldn't be "vulnerable to capture by extremists and racists". She has been reported to be the favorite to replace Polanski.

==== Adrian Ramsay ====
Adrian Ramsay previously served as co-leader of the Green Party with Carla Denyer from 2021 to 2025. Ramsay has been serving as a Member of Parliament (MP) from Waveney Valley since 2024.

On 8 May 2025, incumbent co-leader Carla Denyer announced she would not be seeking re-election as leader in 2025 to focus on her role as a constituency MP. 3 days later on 11 May 2025, Ramsay said he would be running for re-election as co-leader, this time with Ellie Chowns, an MP from North Herefordshire. On 30 August 2025, it was announced that Polanski had been elected the sole leader of the party. On 8 October 2026, Ramsay has criticized Polanski's choice to skip the motion to put "Zionism is racism" in to the party policy, and suggested he could quit the party. However, he clarified that he is "not ruling anything in or out".

==== Hannah Spencer ====
Hannah Spencer is currently serving as a Member of Parliament (MP) from Gorton and Denton since 2026.

Spencer, is described as an ally to leader Zack Polanski, and held a joint conference with him after her victory in Gorton and Denton. On 9 October 2026, Spencer said that Polanski had her "full support" as leader after he lost the 2026 Holborn and St Pancras by-election to Labour candidate Sagal Abdi-Wali. It is unlikely she will run since Polanski is running considering this. However, with recent controversies involving Polanski following his by-election loss, some sources have speculated she might still run. She is listed as a potential successor to Polanski but has been listed behind fellow MP Ellie Chowns.

==== Mothin Ali ====
Mothin Ali is currently serving as one of the deputy leaders serving with Rachel Millward since 2025. Ali has been serving on the Leeds City Council from Gipton and Harehills since 2024.

On 17 October 2026, it was reported that the police launched in an investigation into Ali over a smashed phone call claim. 2 days later, Ali won a lawsuit about his involvement in the 2024 Harehill Riots. On 20 October 2026, Ali was listed as a potential successor to Polanski if he resigns or choses not to run for re-election, but is listed behind MPs Ellie Chowns and Hannah Spencer.
