= Deputy leader =

Second-in-command of a political party

A deputy leader (in Scottish English, sometimes depute leader) in the Westminster system is the second-in-command of a political party, behind the party leader. Deputy leaders often become Deputy prime minister when their parties are elected to government. The deputy leader may take on the role of the leader if the current leader is, for some reason, unable to perform their role as leader. For example, the deputy leader often takes the place of the party leader at question time sessions in their absence. They also often have other responsibilities of party management.

== Current Deputy leaders ==
=== Australia ===
- Ted O'Brien, Deputy leader of the Liberal Party of Australia
- Richard Marles, Deputy leader of the Australian Labor Party
- Kevin Hogan, Deputy leader of the National Party of Australia
- Mehreen Faruqi, Deputy leader of the Australian Greens

=== Canada ===
- Vacant, Deputy leader of the Liberal Party of Canada
- Mike Morrice, Deputy leader of the Green Party of Canada
- Melissa Lantsman and Tim Uppal, Deputy leaders of the Conservative Party of Canada
- Vacant, Deputy leader of the New Democratic Party

==== Ontario ====
- Sol Mamakwa, Deputy leader of the Ontario New Democratic Party

=== Ireland ===
- Helen McEntee, Deputy leader of Fine Gael
- Jack Chambers, Deputy leader of Fianna Fáil
- Michelle O'Neill, Vice president of Sinn Féin
- Cian O'Callaghan, Deputy leader of the Social Democrats
- Róisín Garvey, Deputy leader of the Green Party
- Gemma Brolly, Deputy leader of Aontú

=== New Zealand ===
- Nicola Willis, Deputy leader of the National Party of New Zealand
- Carmel Sepuloni, Deputy leader of the New Zealand Labour Party
- Shane Jones, Deputy leader of New Zealand First
- Brooke van Velden, Deputy leader of ACT New Zealand

=== United Kingdom ===
- Lucy Powell, Deputy leader of the Labour Party
- Daisy Cooper, Deputy leader of the Liberal Democrats
- Richard Tice, Deputy Leader of Reform UK
- Mothin Ali and Rachel Millward, Deputy leaders of the Green Party of England and Wales
- Vacant since 2 November 2024, Conservative Party

==== Scotland ====
- Keith Brown, Depute leader of the Scottish National Party
- Jackie Baillie, Deputy leader of the Scottish Labour Party
- Wendy Chamberlain, Deputy leader of the Scottish Liberal Democrats

==== Wales ====
- Carolyn Harris, Deputy leader of the Welsh Labour Party
- Delyth Jewell, Deputy leader of Plaid Cymru
- David Chadwick, Deputy leader of the Welsh Liberal Democrats
- Phil Davies and Linda Rogers, Deputy leaders of the Wales Green Party

==== Northern Ireland ====
- Michelle McIlveen, Deputy leader of the Democratic Unionist Party
- Vacant, Deputy leader of the Social Democratic and Labour Party
- Eóin Tennyson, Deputy leader of the Alliance Party of Northern Ireland
- Lesley Veronica, Deputy leader of the Green Party in Northern Ireland
