= 2025 United Kingdom electoral calendar =

2025 elections in the United Kingdom
- England: Local elections
- Northern Ireland: No elections held
- Scotland: No elections held
- Wales: No elections held
- Other: Falkland Islands general election; Other by-elections and party elections

This is a list of elections in the United Kingdom that were held in 2025. Included are local elections, by-elections, referendums and internal party elections.

== By month ==
=== May ===
- 1 May – 2025 United Kingdom local elections
- 1 May – 2025 Runcorn and Helsby by-election

=== August ===
- 2025 Green Party of England and Wales deputy leadership election

=== September ===
- 2025 Green Party of England and Wales leadership election
- 2025 Scottish Greens co-leadership election

=== October ===
- 2025 Labour Party deputy leadership election

=== December ===
- 2025 Falkland Islands general election

== See also ==
- 2025 in the United Kingdom
