= 2023 Wealden District Council election =

2023 English local election

- 4 May 2023

All 45 seats to Wealden District Council 23 seats needed for a majority

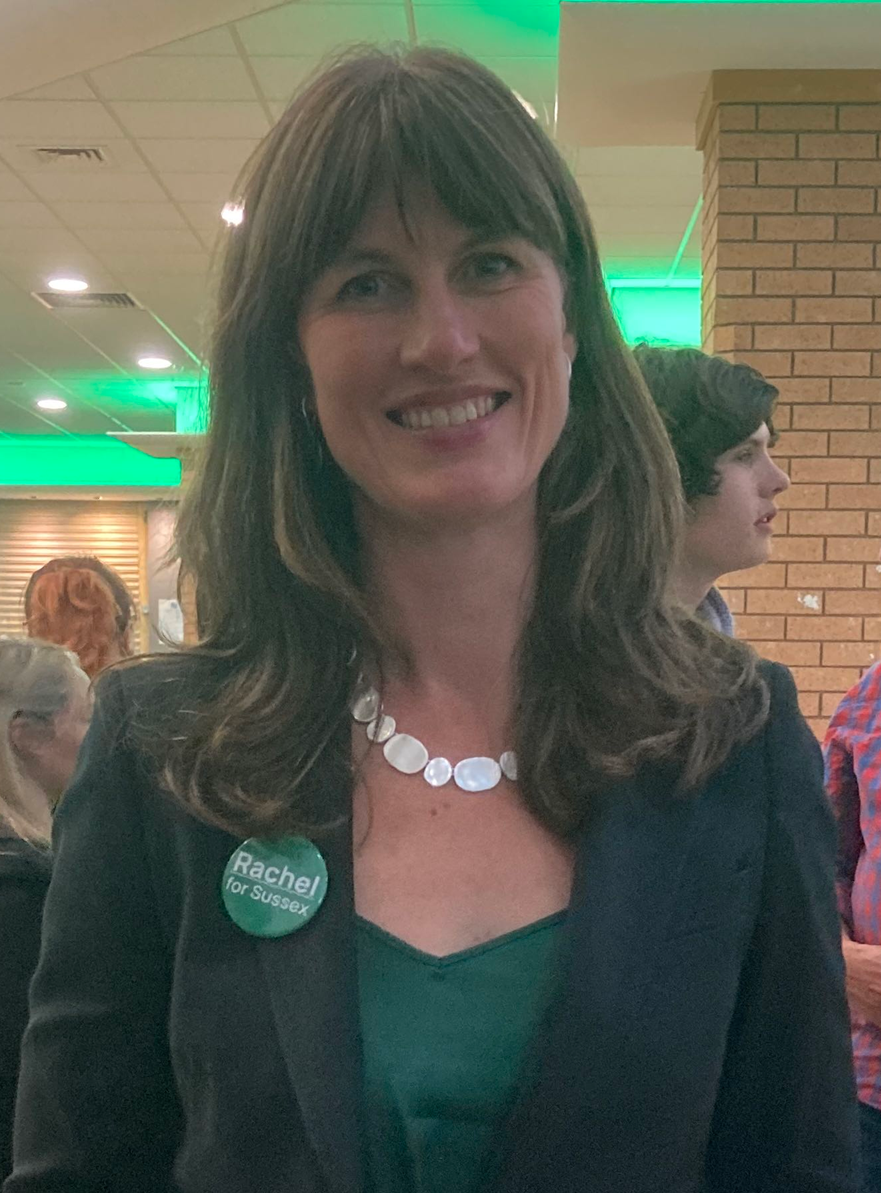

	First party	Second party	Third party
Leader	James Partridge	Rachel Millward	Ann Newton
Party	Liberal Democrats	Green	Conservative
Leader since	May 2023	May 2023	May 2022
Leader's seat	Crowborough North	Hartfield	Framfield & Cross-in-Hand
Last election	4 seats, 13.7%	2 seats, 19.2%	34 seats, 45.2%
Seats before	6	4	28
Seats after	13	11	9
Seat change	▲9	▲9	▼25
Popular vote	9,839	11,476	18,601
Percentage	18.5%	21.6%	35.0%
Swing	▲4.8%	▲2.4%	▼10.2%
	Fourth party	Fifth party	Sixth party
Leader	David White	Stephen Shing	Daniel Manvell
Party	Independent	Independent Democrat Group	Labour
Leader since	May 2021	May 2007	May 2023
Leader's seat	Hellingly	Lower Willingdon	Uckfield North
Last election	1 seat	4 seats	0 seats, 8.9%
Seats before	3	4	0
Seats after	6	4	2
Seat change	▲5	0	▲2
Popular vote			4,570
Percentage			8.6%
Swing			▼0.3%
- Winner of each seat at the 2023 Wealden District Council election
Council control before election
Conservative
Council control after election
Liberal Democrat/Green
coalition

The 2023 Wealden District Council election was held on 4 May 2023 to elect all 45 members of Wealden District Council. This was on the same day as other local elections across England.

At the first meeting of the Council on 24 May 2023, the first ever non-Conservative administration was elected in the Council's 50-year history. The Liberal Democrat Leader James Partridge was elected as Leader of the Council and the Greens' Leader Rachel Millward was elected as Deputy Leader of the Council, with leadership to rotate annually. The new leadership appointed 4 Liberal Democrats and 3 Greens to the Cabinet.

== Results summary ==
The Conservatives lost the council to no overall control for the first time in 25 years. The election also returned the first Labour councillors in the council's history, with two elected in Uckfield.

2023 Wealden District Council election
Party	Candidates	Seats	Gains	Losses	Net gain/loss	Seats %	Votes %	Votes	+/−
Liberal Democrats	22	13	9	0	▲9	28.9	18.5	9,839	+4.8
Green	14	11	9	0	▲9	24.4	21.6	11,476	+2.4
Independent	22	10	5	0	▲5	22.2	15.4	8,193	+3.8
Conservative	44	9	0	25	▼25	20.0	35.0	18,601	–10.2
Labour	11	2	2	0	▲2	4.4	8.6	4,570	–0.3
UKIP	2	0	0	0	Steady	0.0	0.7	346	–0.7
Reform	1	0	0	0	Steady	0.0	0.2	121	N/A
SDP	1	0	0	0	Steady	0.0	0.1	34	N/A

== Ward results ==
Wealden District Council results.

Sitting councillors are marked with an asterisk (*).

=== Arlington ===
Arlington
Party	Candidate	Votes	%	±%
Green	Alison Wilson	668	54.6	+24.5
Conservative	Russell Watts	446	36.5	−12.3
Liberal Democrats	Catherine Hall	109	8.9	−12.2
Majority		222	18.1	N/A
Turnout		1,223	49.96	+8.02
Registered electors		2,418		
Green gain from Conservative		Swing	18.4	

=== Buxted ===
Buxted
Party	Candidate	Votes	%	±%
Green	Graham Shaw	671	60.2	+27.5
Conservative	Laura Stevens-Smith	444	39.8	−19.5
Majority		227	20.4	N/A
Turnout		1,115	39.01	+0.67
Registered electors		2,858		
Green gain from Conservative		Swing	23.5	

=== Chiddingly, East Hoathly & Waldron ===
Chiddingly, East Hoathly & Waldron
Party	Candidate	Votes	%	±%
Conservative	Geoffrey Draper*	578	61.2	+6.2
Labour	Tony Fielding	367	38.8	+28.0
Majority		211	22.4	−12.1
Turnout		945	34.92	−6.42
Registered electors		2,706		
Conservative hold		Swing	-10.9	

=== Crowborough Central ===
Crowborough Central
Party	Candidate	Votes	%	±%
Liberal Democrats	Carolyn Clark	576	54.8	New
Conservative	Ronald Reed*	410	39.0	−12.0
Independent	Peter Bucklitsch	65	6.2	−21.9
Majority		166	15.8	N/A
Turnout		1,051	34.68	+5.93
Registered electors		3,031		
Liberal Democrats gain from Conservative		Swing	N/A	

=== Crowborough Jarvis Brook ===
Crowborough Jarvis Brook
Party	Candidate	Votes	%	±%
Liberal Democrats	Gareth Owen-Williams*	648	75.3	+37.6
Conservative	Craig Edwards	212	24.7	−0.2
Majority		436	50.6	+37.8
Turnout		860	28.61	−2.00
Registered electors		3,006		
Liberal Democrats hold		Swing	18.9	

=== Crowborough North ===
Crowborough North
Party	Candidate	Votes	%	±%
Liberal Democrats	Walter Partridge	605	54.4	New
Independent	Kay Moss*	265	23.8	New
Conservative	James Turgoose	243	21.8	−30.1
Majority		340	30.6	N/A
Turnout		1,113	39.85	+6.22
Registered electors		2,793		
Liberal Democrats gain from Conservative		Swing	N/A	

=== Crowborough South East ===
Crowborough South East
Party	Candidate	Votes	%	±%
Liberal Democrats	Andrew Wilson	732	73.9	+35.8
Conservative	Philip Lunn*	258	26.1	−20.3
Majority		474	47.8	N/A
Turnout		990	31.61	−0.39
Registered electors		3,122		
Liberal Democrats gain from Conservative		Swing	28.0	

=== Crowborough South West ===
Crowborough South West
Party	Candidate	Votes	%	±%
Liberal Democrats	Alison Arthur	454	58.5	+35.5
Conservative	Neil Waller*	322	41.5	−10.0
Majority		132	17.0	N/A
Turnout		776	31.38	+4.60
Registered electors		2,482		
Liberal Democrats gain from Conservative		Swing	22.7	

=== Crowborough St Johns ===
Crowborough St Johns
Party	Candidate	Votes	%	±%
Green	Martyn Everitt	572	49.5	+12.9
Conservative	Richard Hallett*	501	43.4	−20.0
Labour	Sarah Bammann	82	7.1	New
Majority		71	6.1	N/A
Turnout		1,155	42.33	+5.79
Registered electors		2,733		
Green gain from Conservative		Swing	16.4	

=== Danehill & Fletching ===
Danehill & Fletching
Party	Candidate	Votes	%	±%
Green	Christina Coleman	1,107	64.2	+23.1
Conservative	Roy Galley*	545	31.6	−27.3
Independent	Wes Constantinou	73	4.2	New
Majority		562	32.6	N/A
Turnout		1,725	53.08	+13.04
Registered electors		3,250		
Green gain from Conservative		Swing	25.2	

=== Forest Row ===
Forest Row
Party	Candidate	Votes	%	±%
Green	Diana Patterson-Vanegas*	937	78.0	−1.1
Independent	Rowena Moore	265	22.0	New
Majority		672	56.0	−2.2
Turnout		1,202	42.58	−10.68
Registered electors		2,823		
Green hold		Swing	N/A	

=== Framfield & Cross-in-Hand ===
Framfield & Cross-in-Hand
Party	Candidate	Votes	%	±%
Conservative	Ann Newton*	571	57.5	−0.7
Labour	Peter Ullmann	422	42.5	+34.5
Majority		149	15.0	−17.9
Turnout		993	37.37	−1.60
Registered electors		2,657		
Conservative hold		Swing	17.6	

=== Frant & Wadhurst ===
Frant & Wadhurst (2 seats)
Party	Candidate	Votes	%	±%
Green	Sarah Glynn-Ives	882	46.4	N/A
Conservative	Johanna Howell	865	45.5	N/A
Conservative	Gill Weavers	766	40.3	N/A
Independent	Serena Gadd	655	34.4	N/A
Labour	James Walker	635	33.4	N/A
Majority		N/A	N/A	N/A
Turnout		2,137	39.09	+2.52
Registered electors		5,467		
Green gain from Conservative		Swing	N/A	
Conservative hold		Swing	N/A	

=== Hadlow Down & Rotherfield ===
Hadlow Down & Rotherfield
Party	Candidate	Votes	%	±%
Conservative	Michael Lunn*	Unopposed		
Registered electors		2,657		
Conservative hold				

=== Hailsham Central ===
Hailsham Central
Party	Candidate	Votes	%	±%
Liberal Democrats	Neil Cleaver	432	66.0	+33.8
Conservative	Doina Rusu	222	34.0	−6.3
Majority		210	32.0	N/A
Turnout		654	26.14	−4.05
Registered electors		2,502		
Liberal Democrats gain from Conservative		Swing	20.0	

=== Hailsham East ===
Hailsham East
Party	Candidate	Votes	%	±%
Liberal Democrats	Gavin Blake-Coggins*	520	71.1	+12.1
Conservative	James Cottenham	211	28.9	−12.1
Majority		309	42.2	+24.2
Turnout		731	21.75	−8.44
Registered electors		3,361		
Liberal Democrats hold		Swing	12.1	

=== Hailsham North ===
Hailsham North
Party	Candidate	Votes	%	±%
Liberal Democrats	Paul Holbrook*	583	74.6	+46.6
Conservative	James Hayes	199	25.4	−7.9
Majority		384	49.2	N/A
Turnout		782	30.35	+0.90
Registered electors		2,577		
Liberal Democrats gain from Conservative		Swing	27.2	

=== Hailsham North West ===
Hailsham North West
Party	Candidate	Votes	%	±%
Liberal Democrats	Glynn White	412	52.4	−1.7
Conservative	Steven Keogh	375	47.6	+1.7
Majority		37	4.8	−3.4
Turnout		787	29.25	−0.75
Registered electors		2,691		
Liberal Democrats hold		Swing	-1.7	

=== Hailsham South ===
Hailsham South
Party	Candidate	Votes	%	±%
Liberal Democrats	Anne Blake-Coggins*	381	47.0	+18.2
Conservative	Stephen Coltman	309	38.1	−8.5
Reform	Rob Stevens	121	14.9	New
Majority		72	8.9	N/A
Turnout		811	28.37	+2.55
Registered electors		2,859		
Liberal Democrats gain from Conservative		Swing	13.3	

=== Hailsham West ===
Hailsham West
Party	Candidate	Votes	%	±%
Conservative	Richard Grocock*	293	36.9	−8.7
Liberal Democrats	Alexa Clarke	255	32.2	−4.1
Independent	David Radtke	211	26.6	New
SDP	Stephen Gander	34	4.3	New
Majority		38	4.7	−4.6
Turnout		793	27.00	−1.56
Registered electors		2,937		
Conservative hold		Swing	-2.3	

=== Hartfield ===
Hartfield
Party	Candidate	Votes	%	±%
Green	Rachel Millward*	774	62.9	+19.8
Conservative	Janie Robinson	456	37.1	−19.8
Majority		318	25.8	N/A
Turnout		1,239	43.57	+7.69
Registered electors		2,844		
Green gain from Conservative		Swing	19.8	

=== Heathfield North ===
Heathfield North
Party	Candidate	Votes	%	±%
Independent	Mike Gadd	523	46.8	New
Conservative	Ray Cade*	376	33.7	−26.2
Labour	David Newman	204	18.3	+3.4
Independent	Naz Mian	14	1.3	New
Majority		147	13.1	N/A
Turnout		1,117	33.27	+2.51
Registered electors		3,351		
Independent gain from Conservative		Swing	N/A	

=== Heathfield South ===
Heathfield South
Party	Candidate	Votes	%	±%
Independent	Kevin Benton	716	66.0	New
Conservative	Tom Guyton-Day*	369	34.0	−34.4
Majority		347	32.0	N/A
Turnout		1,085	36.11	+6.92
Registered electors		3,005		
Independent gain from Conservative		Swing	N/A	

=== Hellingly ===
Hellingly
Party	Candidate	Votes	%	±%
Independent	David White*	690	64.0	+1.1
Conservative	Chris Bryant	311	23.8	−2.1
Independent	David Younge	77	7.1	New
Majority		379	40.2	+3.2
Turnout		1,078	25.29	−6.29
Registered electors		4,263		
Independent hold		Swing	1.6	

=== Herstmonceux & Pevensey Levels ===
Herstmonceux & Pevensey Levels (2 seats)
Party	Candidate	Votes	%	±%
Liberal Democrats	Paul Coleshill	1,012	52.1	+28.3
Liberal Democrats	Mark Fairweather	1,000	51.4	N/A
Conservative	Pam Doodes*	737	37.9	−1.1
Conservative	Nuala Geary	620	31.9	−0.2
UKIP	Laurence Keeley	183	9.4	−10.8
UKIP	Mike Pursglove	163	8.4	N/A
Majority		N/A	N/A	N/A
Turnout		1,954	34.87	−4.16
Registered electors		5,603		
Liberal Democrats gain from Conservative		Swing	N/A	
Liberal Democrats gain from Conservative		Swing	N/A	

=== Horam & Punnetts Town ===
Horam & Punnetts Town (2 seats)
Party	Candidate	Votes	%	±%
Green	Cornelie Usborne	1,720	64.8	+31.2
Green	Greg Collins	1,697	63.9	N/A
Conservative	Bob Bowdler*	933	35.2	−12.3
Conservative	Susan Steadman*	812	30.6	−13.3
Majority		N/A	N/A	N/A
Turnout		2,678	44.64	+6.54
Registered electors		5,999		
Green gain from Conservative		Swing	N/A	
Green gain from Conservative		Swing	N/A	

=== Lower Willingdon ===
Lower Willingdon
Party	Candidate	Votes	%	±%
Independent	Stephen Shing*	602	54.7	−14.5
Conservative	Douglas Murray	342	31.1	+10.8
Liberal Democrats	Sarah Whitehead	156	14.2	+3.7
Majority		260	23.6	−25.3
Turnout		1,111	41.72	−2.50
Registered electors		2,663		
Independent hold		Swing	12.6	

=== Maresfield ===
Maresfield
Party	Candidate	Votes	%	±%
Green	Ian Tysh*	950	69.1	−38.2
Conservative	Margaret Galley	424	30.9	−31.1
Majority		526	38.2	N/A
Turnout		1,374	45.36	+8.05
Registered electors		3,039		
Green gain from Conservative		Swing	34.6	

=== Mayfield & Five Ashes ===
Mayfield & Five Ashes
Party	Candidate	Votes	%	±%
Conservative	Brian Redman	716	55.4	−2.2
Green	Simon Darlington-Cramond	344	26.6	−6.7
Labour	Jason Scott-Taggart	233	18.0	+9.0
Majority		372	28.8	+4.5
Turnout		1,293	47.99	+12.30
Registered electors		2,694		
Conservative hold		Swing	2.2	

=== Pevensey Bay ===
Pevensey Bay
Party	Candidate	Votes	%	±%
Independent	Daniel Brookbank	524	64.9	+42.3
Conservative	Di Dear	283	35.1	+4.6
Majority		241	29.8	N/A
Turnout		807	31.85	−9.18
Registered electors		2,533		
Independent gain from Conservative		Swing	18.8	

=== Polegate Central ===
Polegate Central
Party	Candidate	Votes	%	±%
Conservative	Chris Primett	394	37.8	N/A
Liberal Democrats	Andy O'Kane	260	25.0	New
Independent	Malcolm Cunningham	197	18.9	New
Labour	Paul Hunt	190	18.3	New
Majority		134	12.8	N/A
Turnout		1,041	29.12	N/A
Registered electors		3,575		
Conservative hold		Swing	N/A	

=== Polegate North ===
Polegate North
Party	Candidate	Votes	%	±%
Independent	Lin Shing*	351	34.4	−15.4
Conservative	James Heward	310	30.4	+13.2
Independent	Nathan Dunbar	241	23.7	New
Liberal Democrats	Kate Edmonds	117	11.5	+0.1
Majority		41	4.00	−28.7
Turnout		1,019	32.08	−0.10
Registered electors		3,176		
Independent hold		Swing	-14.3	

=== Polegate South & Willingdon Watermill ===
Polegate South & Willingdon Watermill
Party	Candidate	Votes	%	±%
Independent	Daniel Shing*	554	54.1	−18.5
Conservative	Cherie Berry	311	30.4	+14.0
Liberal Democrats	Andy Watkins	159	15.5	New
Majority		243	23.7	−32.5
Turnout		1,024	36.09	+0.31
Registered electors		2,837		
Independent hold		Swing	-16.2	

=== South Downs ===
South Downs
Party	Candidate	Votes	%	±%
Conservative	David Greaves	660	47.9	+3.1
Liberal Democrats	Katrina Best	555	40.3	+2.4
Green	Tom Harrison	163	11.8	−5.4
Majority		105	7.6	+0.7
Turnout		1,378	52.48	+5.85
Registered electors		2,626		
Conservative hold		Swing	0.3	

=== Stone Cross ===
Stone Cross
Party	Candidate	Votes	%	±%
Conservative	Daniel Upton	335	46.5	−5.7
Liberal Democrats	Caroline Adcock	244	33.9	New
Green	Nick Mawdsley	141	19.6	−28.2
Majority		91	12.6	+8.2
Turnout		720	23.46	−0.73
Registered electors		3,069		
Conservative hold		Swing	N/A	

=== Uckfield East ===
Uckfield East
Party	Candidate	Votes	%	±%
Liberal Democrats	Kelvin Williams	429	46.6	+9.5
Independent	Duncan Bennett	298	32.4	New
Conservative	Petrina Voelcker	193	21.0	−7.5
Majority		131	14.2	−13.4
Turnout		920	35.49	+0.16
Registered electors		2,592		
Liberal Democrats hold		Swing	N/A	

=== Uckfield New Town ===
Uckfield New Town (2 seats)
Party	Candidate	Votes	%	±%
Labour	Ben Cox	1,078	53.2	+18.0
Independent	Spike Mayhew	727	35.9	N/A
Labour	Keith Wilson	706	34.8	N/A
Conservative	Helen Firth*	634	31.3	−4.9
Conservative	Ginny Heard	471	23.2	−14.4
Majority		N/A	N/A	N/A
Turnout		2,036	41.21	+1.41
Registered electors		4,941		
Labour gain from Conservative		Swing	N/A	
Independent gain from Conservative		Swing	N/A	

=== Uckfield North ===
Uckfield North
Party	Candidate	Votes	%	±%
Labour	Daniel Manvell	444	51.6	+33.6
Independent	Jackie Love	223	25.9	New
Conservative	Peter Waldock*	194	22.5	−17.8
Majority		221	25.7	N/A
Turnout		861	35.62	+6.58
Registered electors		2,417		
Labour gain from Conservative		Swing	N/A	

=== Uckfield Ridgewood & Little Horsted ===
Uckfield Ridgewood & Little Horsted
Party	Candidate	Votes	%	±%
Independent	Ben Reed	306	41.3	New
Conservative	Adrian Marshall	226	30.5	−13.5
Labour	Christopher Field	209	28.2	+17.3
Majority		80	10.8	N/A
Turnout		741	34.15	−2.51
Registered electors		2,170		
Independent gain from Conservative		Swing	N/A	

=== Upper Willingdon ===
Upper Willingdon
Party	Candidate	Votes	%	±%
Independent	Raymond Shing*	616	55.3	−0.9
Conservative	Robert Findon	299	26.8	−5.2
Liberal Democrats	Dionne Daniel	200	17.9	+6.1
Majority		317	28.5	+4.3
Turnout		1,115	36.25	−5.62
Registered electors		3,076		
Independent hold		Swing	2.1	

=== Withyham ===
Withyham
Party	Candidate	Votes	%	±%
Green	Jessika Hulbert	850	72.3	+19.6
Conservative	Stephen Banham	325	27.7	−19.6
Majority		525	44.6	+39.2
Turnout		1,175	47.49	+8.06
Registered electors		2,474		
Green hold		Swing	19.6	

== Changes 2023–2027 ==
On 15 May 2024 Liberal Democrat councillor for Hailsham Central Ward, Cllr Neil Cleaver, resigned from his party and the 'Alliance for Wealden' (the coalition agreement between the Liberal Democrats and Green Party), therefore becoming an independent citing the Green Party’s left wing ideology and influence on the alliance. On 22 May 2024 it was announced Cllr Cleaver had joined the Conservative Party.

On 24 May 2024, Andrew Wilson, the councillor for Crowborough South East, also left the Liberal Democrats and became an independent also citing the Green Party’s left wing influence on the alliance. As of 2026, Cllr Wilson has since joined the Conservatives.

On 26 March 2026, Conservative councillors David Greaves, representing South Downs, and Neil Cleaver, representing Hailsham Central, defected to Reform UK, becoming the party's first councillors on the council.

On 23 October 2026, the Wealden Green Group released an open letter clarifying they do not support the recently passed ‘Zionism is racism’ motion at the Green Party conference and that they were ‘saddened’ by Labour’s ultimatum to its local councillors. Despite this, on 29 October 2026 Green councillor for Danehill & Fletching ward Christina Coleman announced her defection to the Liberal Democrats, remaining a part of the ‘Alliance for Wealden’, citing the recent ‘Zionism is racism’ motion for her departure. On 02 November 2026, following direction from the national Labour Party, the two Labour councillors: Daniel Manvell (Uckfield North) and Ben Cox (Uckfield New Town), departed from the ‘Alliance for Wealden’ due to the ‘Zionism is racism’ motion.This leaves the administration with a reduced but intact majority with one independent part of the alliance (Daniel Brookbank, Pevensey Bay ward).

== By-elections ==
=== Uckfield New Town ===
Uckfield New Town by-election, 4 April 2024
Party	Candidate	Votes	%	±%
Independent	Donna Rachel French	582	37.0	N/A
Labour	George Robert Keith Wilson	578	36.7	−16.4
Conservative	Helen Firth	413	26.3	−5.0
Majority		4	0.3	
Turnout		1,573	30.99	−10.22
Registered electors		5,088		
Independent hold				

The Uckfield New Town by-election was triggered by the disqualification of independent councillor Spike Mayhew for non-attendance.

=== Horam & Punnetts Town ===
Horam & Punnetts Town by-election, 10 July 2025
Party	Candidate	Votes	%	±%
Green	Diane Gould	611	36.0	−28.8
Reform	Stephen Potts	561	33.1	N/A
Conservative	Susan Stedman	336	19.8	−15.3
Independent	Barry Carpenter	188	11.1	N/A
Majority		50	2.9	
Turnout		1,696	28.01	−16.63
Registered electors		6,083		
Green hold				

The Horam & Punnetts Town by-election was triggered by the resignation of councillor Cornelie Usborne.
