= 2025 Green Party of England and Wales leadership election =

- 1–30 August 2025
- Registered: 64,581
- Turnout: 24,265 37.6% (▲15.9 pp)
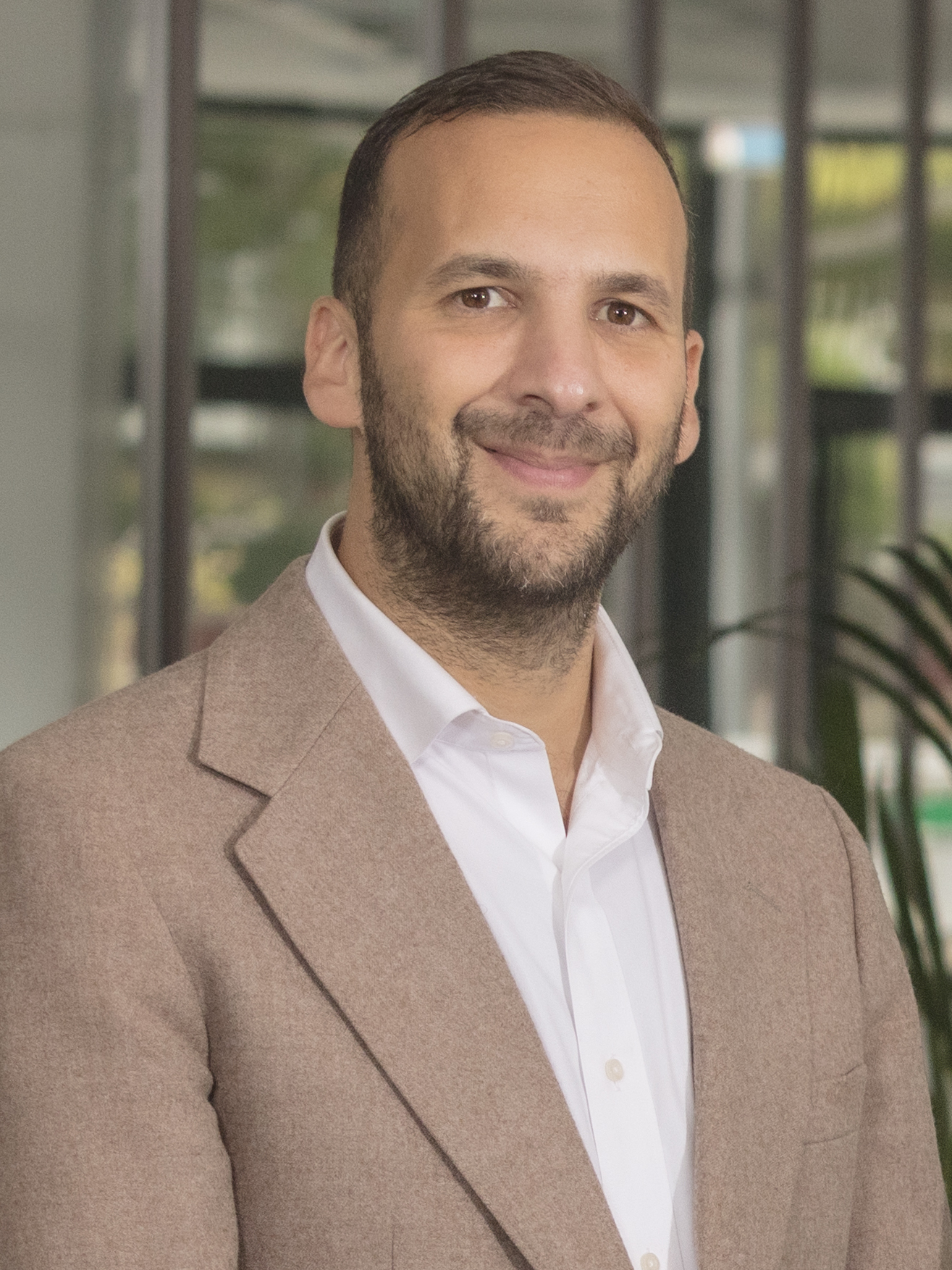

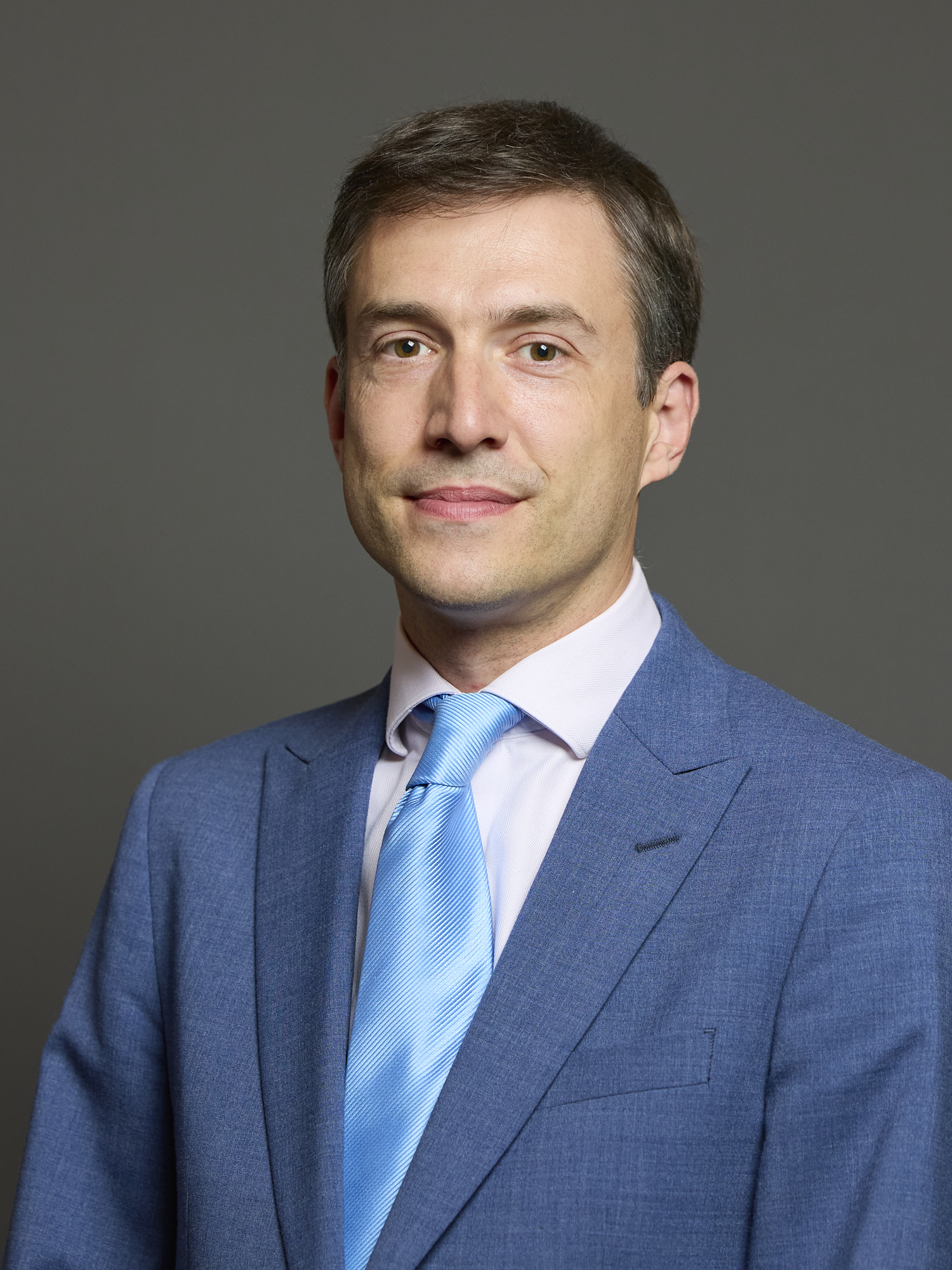

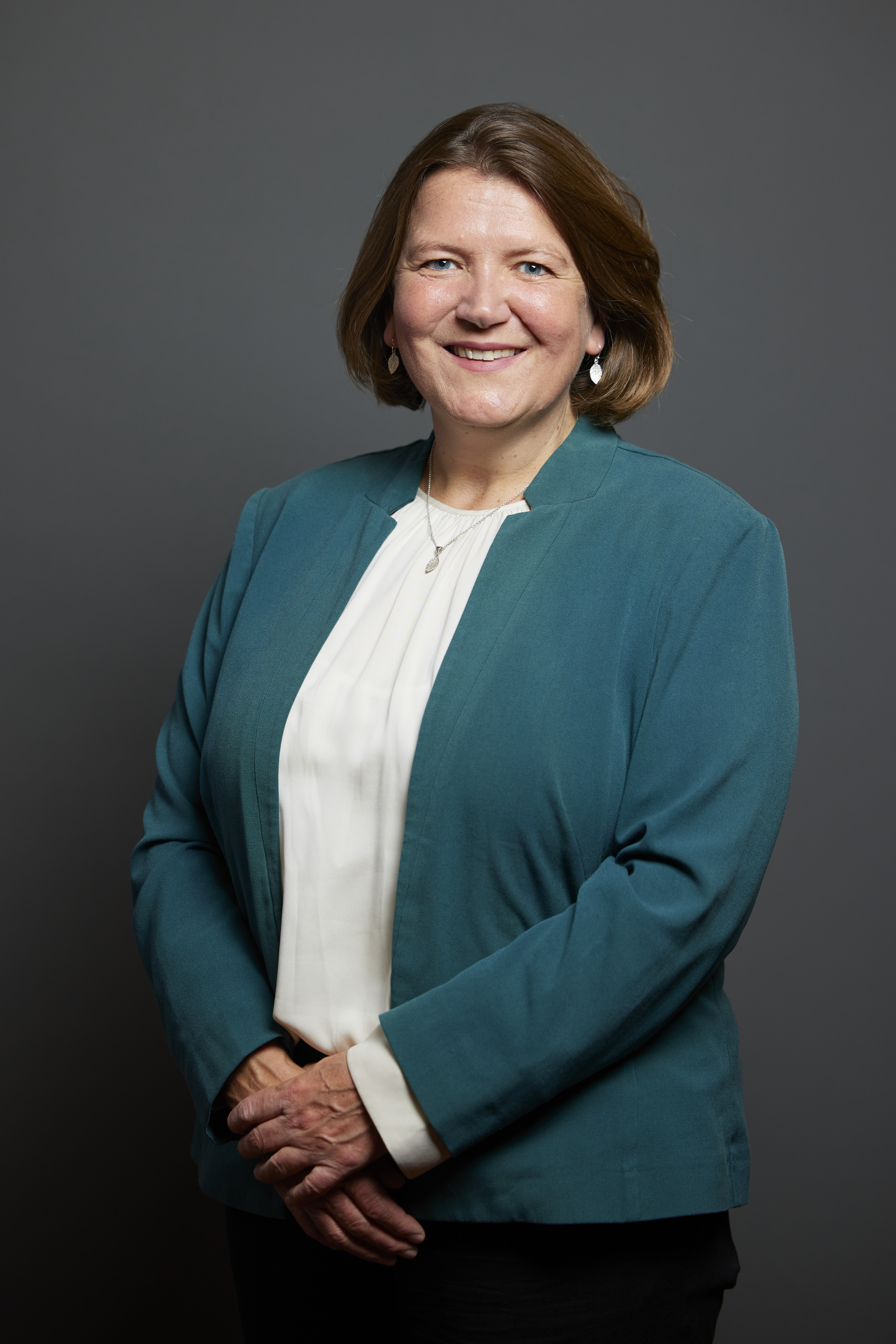
Candidate	Zack Polanski	Adrian Ramsay & Ellie Chowns
Popular vote	20,411	3,705
Percentage	84.1%	15.3%
Leaders before election
Carla Denyer &
Adrian Ramsay
Elected Leader
Zack Polanski

An election for the leader of the Green Party of England and Wales was held between 1–30 August 2025 in line with the party's constitution. It was held concurrently with the party's deputy leadership election and other elections to the executive of the party. There were two candidacies for the leadership: a joint ticket of Adrian Ramsay and Ellie Chowns running to be co-leaders, and Zack Polanski running to be solo leader. Polanski won the vote, gaining 84.1% of the votes.

== Background ==
According to the constitution of the Green Party of England and Wales, leadership elections take place every two years. Candidates can either put themselves forward as individuals or as a co-leadership team of two people. In the event of a single leader, the party will have two deputy leaders. The election due to take place in 2024 was postponed due to the UK general election following a motion passed at the party's 2023 Autumn Conference. Because of this, the term of the leader will only be for one year.

In May 2025, Carla Denyer announced her decision to not seek re-election as co-leader and focus on being an MP.

== Electoral system ==
Candidates for the leader of the party may run either solo or as joint tickets of two candidates; candidates for the deputy leader position must run solo. Members running on a joint-leadership ticket must not be of the same gender.

The elections are held under a single transferable vote system. There is an option to reopen nominations on the ballot. The spending limit for all leadership candidate bids (solo or joint) is £1,000, and £500 for all other candidates.

== Timetable ==
2025 GPEW leadership election timetable
Date(s)	Relevant deadline/period
3 May	Notice of election published
2 June	Nominations open (10 am BST)
30 June	Nominations close (12 noon)
2 July	Statement of Persons Nominated published
3 July	Campaign period begins
1 August	Ballots open
30 August	Ballots close (12 noon)
1 September	Deadline for postal ballots
2 September	Results announced

== Campaign ==
Two slates were nominated: a joint ticket by incumbent co-leader Adrian Ramsay alongside Ellie Chowns, and a separate ticket of Zack Polanski standing as a single candidate. The senior political correspondent of The Guardian, Peter Walker, said that the election has presented Green members with a choice similar to that in the last election in 2021: either "election-focused professionals" or "insurgent activists". He also made the point that the joint Ramsay/Chowns ticket was expected to be the favourites, but suggested that any side could win.

Before nominations closed, the Green-focused political blog, Bright Green, published an article suggesting that the race would be between the two high-profile tickets, and that it was unlikely any third ticket could garner enough support to win. Polanski was variously described as the 'favourite' (New Statesman, 8 July) and the 'frontrunner' (Huffington Post, 26 July; Financial Times, 6 August). Summarising commentator opinion, The Guardian suggested that those expressing a view thought that Polanski would win, 'perhaps quite easily'; in the same live blog covering a hustings, they claimed there was 'nothing' that suggested the commentator consensus was wrong.

On the day voting opened, on 1 August, Channel 4 suggested that the leadership race was one focused on "style over substance" and what groups the Greens should appeal to. They said that "there isn't much difference in the two sides' offerings".

On 17 August, The Guardian reported that senior figures in the party believed that Polanski was starting to 'pull away' from Ramsay/Chowns, with a growing expectation he would win. Allies of Ramsay disputed this, claiming the race was much closer.

=== Zack Polanski ===
On 5 May 2025, Zack Polanski, the incumbent deputy leader of the party, announced his campaign to become party leader. To The Guardian, Polanski suggested he wanted to make the party more visible and take a more eco-populist direction. In the campaign he has advocated for the Green Party to be less timid, saying that they needed to become a bold mass-membership political force capable of challenging Reform UK and Nigel Farage. He has also said that the party should "learn" from Farage, especially from his communication skills.

Polanski has said that the Green Party having a single leader instead of a co-leader would allow the party to more effectively convey its message in the media, and has argued that leftist candidates are best placed to grow the party in parliament. He has also indicated that he would welcome into the Green Party both Labour left MPs and left-wing independent MPs disaffected with the current Labour government. During the leadership election campaign, former Labour MP Zarah Sultana announced the founding of a new left-wing party with Jeremy Corbyn on 5 July, with the project finalised on 24 July. Polanski responded, saying he would be open to cooperating with this new party.

Polanski has criticised the Labour government's approach to net-zero, arguing that the wealthy and big business should pay via a wealth tax for the green transition, rather than individuals. Polanski has taken a more critical position on NATO, telling the Byline Times on 8 May that he believed the UK's membership of NATO was untenable, in part due to Donald Trump's threats to annex Greenland. He instead advocated for "international alliances based on peace".

Polanski has faced scrutiny for having been a member of the Green Party only since 2017, having defected from the Liberal Democrats, and for his former career in hypnotherapy, including involvement in an article in The Sun where he provided hypnotherapy (without charge) for breast enlargement to a journalist, for which he subsequently apologised.

Polanski formally launched his campaign online on 11 May, with more than 300 people in attendance. On 5 June, Polanski released an open letter, in which 107 Green councillors had signed to support him. On 6 June, the Bright Green blog published an article saying that Polanski had generated higher media coverage for his leadership campaign.

The Guardian reported that Polanski's campaign and communications were bringing in an 'influx' of new left-leaning members, which was likened to a 'hostile takeover' by a senior figure in the party.

=== Adrian Ramsay and Ellie Chowns ===
As Carla Denyer announced on 8 May she would not seek re-election so as to focus on work as an MP, this meant that incumbent co-leader Adrian Ramsay would either have to seek another co-candidate, or stand as a single lone candidate. On 11 May, Ramsay launched a joint leadership bid with fellow MP Ellie Chowns. Both MPs were first elected in rural, formerly Conservative-voting seats, which they pointed to as evidence that they would win over new supporters, rather than appealing to their base. As such, the pair hoped to be able to appeal to a wide coalition of voters, including former conservatives. Chowns said the two would make a "really well-matched pair". Ramsay also suggested that it would be difficult for Polanski to lead the party without a seat in Parliament.

Ramsay faced criticism for his refusal to give a firm answer on whether he believed trans women are women, and for stating that people with transphobic views should not be expelled from the Green Party. He has also faced criticism for opposing the construction of electric pylons in his constituency.

The duo formally launched their campaign online on 20 May, with over 150 people in attendance. On 6 June, the Bright Green blog published an article saying that the Ramsay–Chowns joint bid was emphasising its professionalism.

Chowns rejected the idea of an alliance with Corbyn and Sultana's new party. Ramsay later argued that the new party "blows Zack Polanski's leadership pitch out of the water".

== Candidates ==
The candidate lists were released on 2 July. There were 2 candidacies (solo or joint) for the leadership, 9 candidates for the deputy leadership, and several other candidates for other internal positions. Two roles were contested by only one candidacy and would only face 'reopen nominations'.

Candidate(s)	Slogan	Political office	Announced	Campaign	Source(s)
Zack Polanski	Bold Leadership. Now.	Deputy Leader of the Green Party (2022–2025) Member of the London Assembly (2021–present)	5 May 2025	backzack.com	
Adrian Ramsay	Together We Win	Incumbent Co-leader of the Green Party (2021–2025) MP for Waveney Valley (2024–present)	11 May 2025	www.ellie-adrian-2025.org	
Ellie Chowns	Together We Win	MP for North Herefordshire (2024–present) Spokesperson for Housing and Communities (2024–present)	11 May 2025	www.ellie-adrian-2025.org	

=== Explored ===
- Shahrar Ali, former deputy leader of the party. (Note: Shahrar Ali was suspended from the GPEW following complaints in 2022, but has been attempting to have his membership reinstated through a legal process.)

=== Declined ===
- Mothin Ali, Leeds City councillor (endorsed Polanski, successfully ran for deputy leader).
- Carla Denyer, incumbent co-leader of the party.
- Amanda Onwuemene, Wirral councillor, Chair of Global Majority Greens, and incumbent spokesperson for policing and domestic safety (endorsed Ramsay/Chowns).

== Hustings and debates ==
The debates that took place for the leadership were as follows:

Date	Title	Host	Participants		Link	Wider coverage
Date	Title	Host	Polanski	Ramsay/Chowns	Link	Wider coverage
13 July	Green Party: Leader debate	The New Statesman podcast	Present	Present (Ramsay)	YouTube	
17 July	Pod Save the UK's Green Party debate	Pod Save the UK	Present	Present (Chowns)	YouTube	
23 July	Green Party leadership debate	LBC (Iain Dale)	Present	Present (Ramsay)	YouTube	

There were also a number of hustings across the country for the leadership, and for other Green Party Executive roles, both those organised by the party, and ones at events like Glastonbury festival.

== Endorsements ==
=== Zack Polanski ===
==== Former or incumbent elected officials ====
- Zoe Garbett, member of the London Assembly and candidate in the 2024 London mayoral election.
- Ross Greer, Member of the Scottish Parliament for West Scotland and candidate in the 2025 Scottish Greens co-leadership election
- Glenn Haffenden, Hastings Borough Council leader.
- Stuart Jeffery, Maidstone Borough Council leader.
- Gillian Mackay, Member of the Scottish Parliament for Central Scotland and candidate in the 2025 Scottish Greens co-leadership election
- Rachel Millward, Wealden District Council co-leader and candidate in the 2025 Green Party of England and Wales deputy leadership election.
- Catherine Rowett, former MEP, incumbent work and social security spokesperson.
- Caroline Russell, leader of the Green Party in the London Assembly.
- Larry Sanders, former health spokesperson, former Oxfordshire County councillor.
- Ani Townsend, Bristol councillor and candidate in the 2025 Green Party of England and Wales deputy leadership election.
- Thelma Walker, former Labour MP.

==== Others ====
- Grace Blakeley, economics and politics commentator, columnist, journalist and author.
- Owen Jones, journalist and activist.
- Rosi Sexton, candidate in the 2020 Green leadership election.
- Anthony Slaughter, leader of the Wales Green Party.
- Phil Davies, deputy leader of the Wales Green Party.

==== Publications ====
- The Canary

=== Adrian Ramsay and Ellie Chowns ===
==== Former or incumbent elected officials ====
- Ian Davison, Warwick District Council leader.
- Tony Dyer, Bristol City Council leader.
- Caroline Jackson, Lancaster City Council leader.
- Jenny Jones, peer and former member of the London Assembly.
- Caroline Lucas, former MP and leader.
- Jim Martin, Folkestone and Hythe District Council leader.
- Andy Mellen, Mid Suffolk District Council leader.
- Zoe Nicholson, Lewes District Council leader.
- Rupert Read, academic and former Norwich City councillor.
- Molly Scott Cato, former MEP and external communications coordinator on the Green Party Executive.
- Caroline Topping, East Suffolk District Council leader.
- Chloe Turner, Stroud District Council leader.
- Bob Gledhill, Chair Broxbourne Green Party and former councillor on Norwich City Council https://x.com/AdrianRamsay/status/1950218008632152104

==== Others ====
- Hugh Fearnley-Whittingstall, chef and broadcaster.
- Helen Geake, Internal Communications Coordinator on the Green Party Executive.
- Jonathon Porritt, author, campaigner and former chair of the Ecology Party.
- Owen Brett, Broxbourne Green Party and 2024 Parliamentary candidate for the Broxbourne (constituency) constituency.

== Polls ==
=== All GB voters ===
FocalData conducted a poll in which they asked members of the public to choose which ticket they supported, after watching one campaign video from each candidacy.

Dates conducted	Pollster	Client	Sample size	Zack Polanski	Chowns and Ramsay	Don't know	Would not vote	Lead
15–19 Aug 2025	FocalData	N/A	1,500	38%	20%	11%	31%	18

=== Green Party members ===
FindOutNow conducted a poll of Green Party of England and Wales members to choose which ticket they supported.

Dates conducted	Pollster	Client	Sample size	Zack Polanski	Chowns and Ramsay	Lead
30 Aug 2025	Election result			84.6%	15.4%	69.2
21 Aug – 1 Sep 2025	FindOutNow	N/A	228	65%	35%	30

== Results ==
Zack Polanski won with 20,411 votes, the Ramsay–Chowns ticket won 3,705 votes, with re-opening nominations receiving 149 votes.

2025 Green Party leadership election
Candidate	Votes	%
Zack Polanski	20,411	84.1%
Adrian Ramsay and Ellie Chowns	3,705	15.3%
Re-open nominations	149	0.6%
Turnout: 24,265

== See also ==
- 2025 Scottish Greens co-leadership election
- 2025 Green Party of England and Wales deputy leadership election
