= Ellie Chowns =

British politician (born 1975)

Ellie Chowns MP
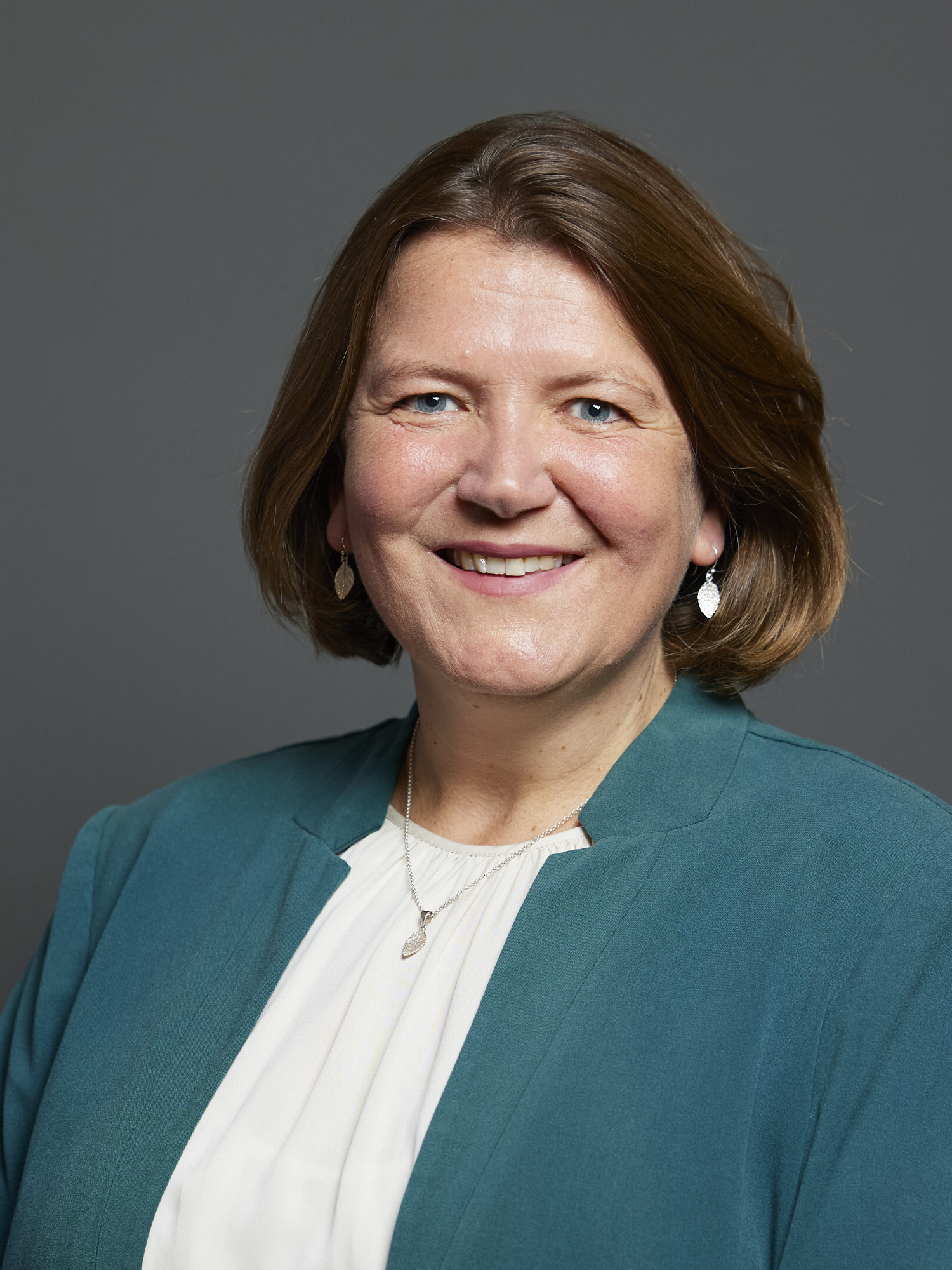
- Official portrait, 2024

Leader of the Green Party of England and Wales in the House of Commons
- Incumbent
- Assumed office 4 September 2025
- Party Leader: Zack Polanski
- Preceded by: Carla Denyer (Note: as Party Co-Leader); Adrian Ramsay

Member of Parliament for North Herefordshire
- Incumbent
- Assumed office 4 July 2024
- Preceded by: Bill Wiggin
- Majority: 5,894 (11.7%)

Member of the European Parliament for West Midlands
- In office 2 July 2019 – 31 January 2020
- Preceded by: Siôn Simon
- Succeeded by: Constituency abolished

Member of Herefordshire Council for Bishops Frome & Cradley
- In office 3 May 2019 – 20 September 2024

Personal details
- Born: Eleanor Elizabeth Chowns; 7 March 1975 (age 51) Chertsey, Surrey, England
- Party: Green Party of England and Wales
- Education: University of Sussex (BA); Middlesex University (MProf); University of Birmingham (PGCert, MA, PhD)
- Website: elliechowns.org.uk

Eleanor Elizabeth Chowns (born 7 March 1975) is a British Green Party politician and academic, serving as the Member of Parliament for North Herefordshire since 2024. Since September 2025, she has served as the group leader of the party in the House of Commons, and previously served as a Member of the European Parliament (MEP) for the West Midlands for the party from 2019 to 2020.

In 2025, Chowns ran for co-leader of the Green Party in a joint bid with incumbent co-leader Adrian Ramsay, losing to Zack Polanski. Despite her loss, she was subsequently chosen by her fellow Green MPs as the party's parliamentary leader. She was formerly a councillor on Herefordshire Council and leader of the council's Green group until stepping down following her election to parliament.

== Early life and education ==
Chowns was born on 7 March 1975 in Chertsey. She is the daughter of Gillian and Stephen Chowns, who is a Methodist local preacher and worked as a lecturer in human resource management. The couple moved to Ledbury, Herefordshire, in Ellie Chowns's constituency, in 2013, and in 2024 Stephen Chowns was elected mayor of Ledbury Town Council. Ellie Chowns has a brother, Jonathan.

She studied geography, environmental studies, and development studies at the University of Sussex, graduating with a Bachelor of Arts (BA) degree in 1997. She then undertook a one-year Master of Professional Studies (MProf) degree in sustainable development at the University of Middlesex, graduating in 1998. She later undertook doctoral research in international development at the University of Birmingham. She completed her Doctor of Philosophy (PhD) degree in 2014, with a doctoral thesis titled "The political economy of community management: a study of factors influencing sustainability in Malawi's rural water supply sector".

== Career ==
Chowns is a specialist in international development, having worked for charities such as Voluntary Service Overseas and Christian Aid and as a lecturer at the University of Birmingham.

== Political career ==
Chowns got involved in politics in 2015. In 2017 she was elected as a councillor on Herefordshire Council, and became the leader of the Green group. In the May 2019 Herefordshire Council elections, Chowns was re-elected onto Herefordshire Council with 78.6% of the vote.

=== European parliament ===
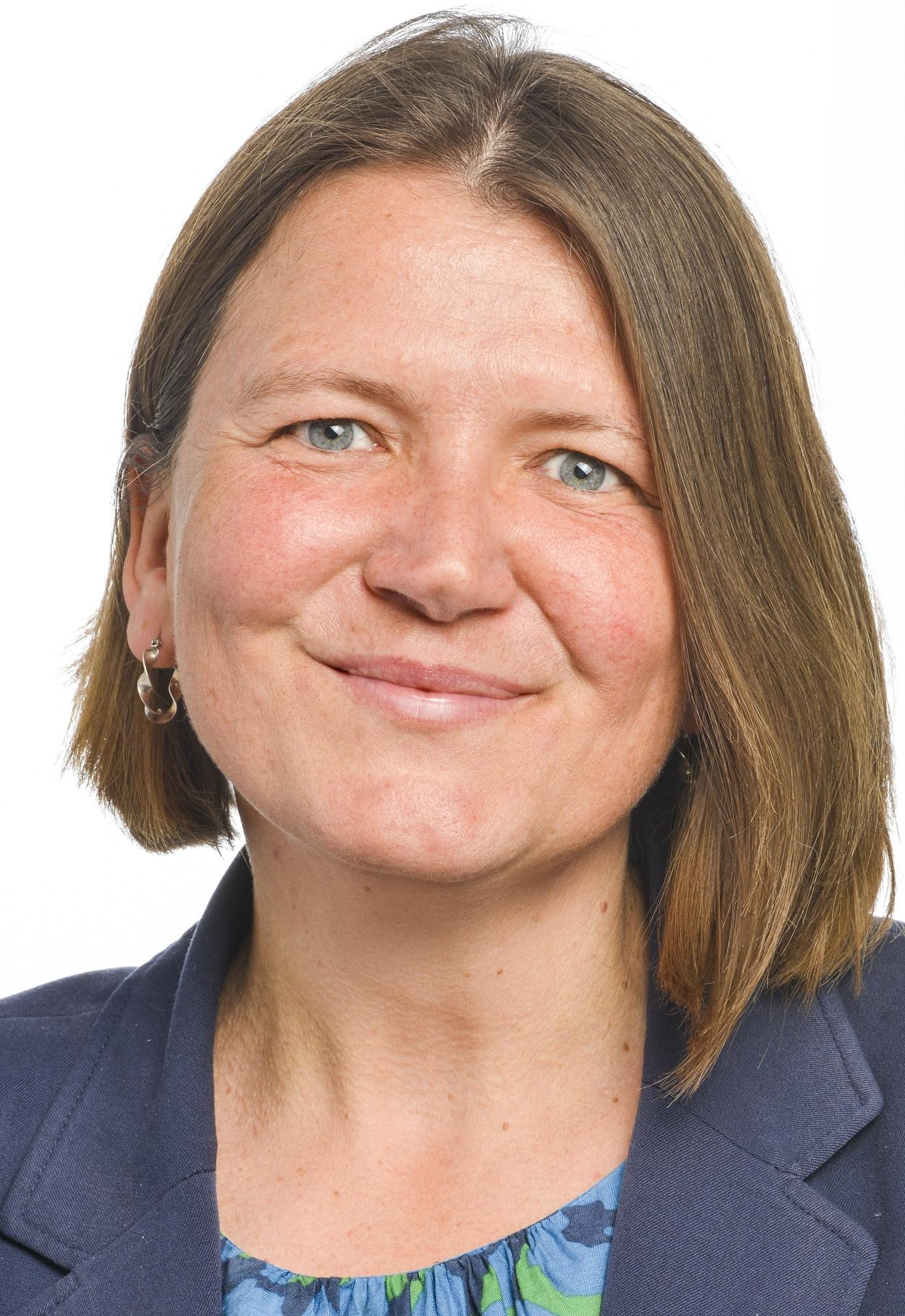
Chowns as an MEP in 2019

Chowns was elected as an MEP in the 2019 European elections, winning 10.66% of the vote share. In the same election, the Green Party won 7 MEPs, up from 3.

=== Extinction Rebellion ===
Chowns was arrested on 14 October 2019 in Trafalgar Square defending the rights of Extinction Rebellion protesters to continue. She was released pending investigation, and later was one of the claimants to challenge the legality of the Section 14 order under which she was arrested. On 6 November 2019 the High Court ruled this blanket use of Section 14 by the Metropolitan Police was unlawful. Chowns declined to sue the Metropolitan Police for unlawful arrest, but declared the ruling to be a "victory for the right to peaceful assembly and protest, two cornerstones of our democracy".

=== House of Commons ===
Chowns stood as the Green candidate for North Herefordshire, a safe seat for the Conservatives, in the 2017 general election, securing 5.5% of the vote. In the 2019 general election, she won 9.3% of the vote share, the sixth-highest Green vote share in the country and the highest of any seat where there was no Unite to Remain alliance.

In the 2024 general election, Chowns was elected Member of Parliament (MP) for North Herefordshire with 21,736 votes (43.2%) and a majority of 5,894 over the second-placed Conservative candidate, Sir Bill Wiggin. She overturned a significant Conservative majority and unseated the incumbent Wiggin with a swing of +34.4% as compared to the 2019 election. Alongside Siân Berry and Green co-leaders Carla Denyer and Adrian Ramsay, she was one of the first five Green MPs in UK history; the first, Caroline Lucas, retired from the Commons in 2024.

On 18 July 2024, Chowns made her maiden speech in the House of Commons during a debate on foreign affairs and defence.

On 11 May, incumbent co-leader Adrian Ramsay launched a joint leadership bid alongside Chowns for the 2025 party leadership election. The results of the leadership were announced on 2 September 2025, with Chowns and Ramsay being defeated by Zack Polanski. On 4 September, Ellie Chowns was elected by Green MPs to lead the Greens within the House of Commons.

== Personal life ==
Chowns has two adult sons.

She is a member of Giving What We Can, a community of people who have pledged to give at least 10% of their income to effective charities.

== Selected works ==
- Chowns, Ellie (October 2015). "Is Community Management an Efficient and Effective Model of Public Service Delivery? Lessons from the Rural Water Supply Sector in Malawi" (PDF). Public Administration and Development. 35 (4): 263–276. doi:10.1002/pad.1737.

== Notes ==
Parliament of the United Kingdom
Preceded by Bill Wiggin	Member of Parliament for North Herefordshire; 2024–present	Incumbent
