= Reform UK election results =

This article lists the election results of the Reform UK in UK parliamentary elections, elections to devolved parliaments, and local elections.

== By-elections, 2021–2026 ==
=== UK Parliament ===
Date of election	Constituency	Candidate	Votes	%	Elected MP	Ref
6 May 2021	Hartlepool, County Durham	John Prescott	368	1.2	Jill Mortimer (Conservative)	
13 May 2021	Airdrie and Shotts, North Lanarkshire	Martyn Greene	45	0.2	Anum Qaisar (SNP)	
17 June 2021	Chesham and Amersham, Buckinghamshire	Alex Wilson	414	1.1	Sarah Green (Liberal Democrat)	
2 December 2021	Old Bexley and Sidcup, London	Richard Tice	1,432	6.6	Louie French (Conservative)	
16 December 2021	North Shropshire, Shropshire	Kirsty Walmsley	1,427	3.7	Helen Morgan (Liberal Democrat)	
3 March 2022	Birmingham Erdington, West Midlands	Jack Brookes	293	1.7	Paulette Hamilton (Labour)	
23 June 2022	Wakefield, West Yorkshire	Chris Walsh	513	1.9	Simon Lightwood (Labour)	
23 June 2022	Tiverton and Honiton, Devon	Andy Foan	481	1.1	Richard Foord (Liberal Democrat)	
1 December 2022	City of Chester, Cheshire	Jeanie Barton	773	2.7	Samantha Dixon (Labour)	
15 December 2022	Stretford and Urmston, Greater Manchester	Paul Swansborough	650	3.5	Andrew Western (Labour)	
9 February 2023	West Lancashire, Lancashire	Jonathan Kay	994	4.4	Ashley Dalton (Labour)	
20 July 2023	Selby and Ainsty, North Yorkshire	David Kent	1,332	3.7	Keir Mather (Labour)	
20 July 2023	Somerton and Frome, Somerset	Bruce Evans	1,303	3.4	Sarah Dyke (Liberal Democrat)	
5 October 2023	Rutherglen and Hamilton West, South Lanarkshire	David Stark	403	1.3	Michael Shanks (Labour)	
19 October 2023	Mid Bedfordshire, Bedfordshire	Dave Holland	1,487	3.7	Alistair Strathern (Labour)	
19 October 2023	Tamworth, Staffordshire	Ian Cooper	1,376	5.4	Sarah Edwards (Labour)	
15 February 2024	Wellingborough, Northamptonshire	Ben Habib	3,919	13.0	Gen Kitchen (Labour)	
15 February 2024	Kingswood, Gloucestershire	Rupert Lowe	2,578	10.8	Damien Egan (Labour)	
29 February 2024	Rochdale, Greater Manchester	Simon Danczuk	1,968	6.3	George Galloway (Workers Party)	
2 May 2024	Blackpool South, Lancashire	Mark Butcher	3,101	16.8	Chris Webb (Labour)	
1 May 2025	Runcorn and Helsby, Cheshire	Sarah Pochin	12,645	38.7	Sarah Pochin	
26 February 2026	Gorton and Denton, Greater Manchester	Matt Goodwin	10,578	28.7	Hannah Spencer (Green)	
18 June 2026	Aberdeen South, Aberdeen City	Jo Hart	2,478	8.6	Douglas Lumsden (Conservative)	
18 June 2026	Arbroath and Broughty Ferry, Angus	Bill Reid	4,341	18.2	Lara Bird (SNP)	
18 June 2026	Makerfield, Greater Manchester	Robert Kenyon	15,696	34.5	Andy Burnham (Labour Co-op)	
13 August 2026	Clacton, Essex	Nigel Farage	22,239	63.3	Nigel Farage	

=== Scottish Parliament ===
Date of election	Constituency	Candidate	Votes	%	Elected MSP	Ref
5 June 2025	Hamilton, Larkhall and Stonehouse, North Lanarkshire	Ross Lambie	7,088	26.1	Davy Russell	

=== Senedd ===
Date of election	Constituency	Candidate	Votes	%	Elected MS	Ref
23 October 2025	Caerphilly, South Wales	Llŷr Powell	12,113	36.0	Lindsay Whittle (Plaid Cymru)	

== Mayoral elections ==
=== 2021 ===
Reform UK endorsed Laurence Fox in the 2021 London mayoral election.

Candidate	Mayoralty	Votes	%
Nick Buckley	2021 Greater Manchester mayoral election	18,910	2.7
Waj Ali	2021 West Yorkshire mayoral election	14,983	2.5
Pete Durnell	2021 West Midlands mayoral election	13,568	2.2
Surjit Singh Duhre	2021 Doncaster mayoral election	1,012	1.6
Robert Clarke	2021 Bristol mayoral election	806	0.6

=== 2024 ===
Candidate	Mayoralty	Votes	%
Dan Barker	2024 Greater Manchester mayoral election	49,532 #4	7.5
Elaine Williams	2024 West Midlands mayoral election	34,471 #4	5.8
Howard Cox	2024 London mayoral election	78,865 #5	3.1

== Police and Crime commissioner elections, 2021 ==
Reform UK stood candidates in 12 police and crime commissioner elections and one subsequent re-run election in Wiltshire.

Candidate	Police area	Votes	%
Peter Jewell	West Mercia	16,419	5.1
Mark James Barker	Lancashire	17,926	4.8
Henry Lu	Warwickshire	6,692	4.1
Mark Hearn	Northamptonshire	7,715	4.0
Tim Prosser	Derbyshire	10,721	3.8
Malcolm James Webster	Merseyside	11,662	3.7
Nick Goulding	Cheshire	8,258	3.7
Peter Escreet	Lincolnshire	6,101	3.6
Sue Morris	Avon and Somerset	8,031	3.5
Mark Hoath	West Midlands	18,002	3.0
Michael Riley	Staffordshire	5,504	2.3
Julian Malins	Wiltshire	4,348	2.1

=== By-elections ===
Candidate	Election	Votes	%
Julian Malins	2021 Wiltshire Police and Crime Commissioner by-election	1,859	2.1
Colin Sutton	2026 Norfolk Police and Crime Commissioner by-election	32,647	26.7

== Local elections ==
- Reform Derby won six seats in the 2023 Derby City Council election.
- Reform won two seats in the 2024 Havant Borough Council election.
- The 2025 local elections in England were described as a sweeping victory for Reform. The party placed first, winning the most seats and took control of a number of local authorities. The party also won the 2025 Runcorn and Helsby by-election. The party won control of Durham County Council. However, one new councillor stepped down within days as it transpired he was ineligible to stand, leading to a by-election in Benfieldside ward, in which Reform came third.
- At the 2026 local elections in England the party's success continued winning 1,454 councillors across the country and multiple councils.

== 2024 general election ==
In the 2024 United Kingdom general election, Reform UK won 5 parliamentary constituencies, Ashfield, Boston and Skegness, Clacton, Great Yarmouth, and South Basildon and East Thurrock. The result marked the first time that Reform UK elected Members of Parliament in a General Election, having won 0 seats on a 2.0 percent vote share at the 2019 General Election. Reform finished second in 98 constituencies. Reform's 3rd place finish on 14.3 percent of the vote led to a 0.8 percent share of the seats won in Parliament, with the Liberal Democrats' 4th place finish on 12.2 percent of the vote resulting in an 11.1 percent share of the seats won in Parliament. The result was widely attributed to the characteristics of the UK's FPTP system, which rewarded parties with high concentrations of voters in specific geographic areas, and penalised parties such as Reform UK, which despite receiving relatively high levels of support across the country as a whole, had broad but shallow support in hundreds of constituencies, with insufficient local support for a 1st place finish. Many Conservative seat losses were attributed to Reform and the Conservatives directly competing in hundreds of constituencies, causing vote-splitting on the right-of-centre.

Election	Leader	Votes		Seats		Outcome
Election	Leader	No.	Share	Seats won	±	Outcome
2024	Nigel Farage	4,117,620	14.3%	5 / 650	▲5	Opposition
