= 2025 Green Party of England and Wales deputy leadership election =

Green Party of England and Wales deputy leadership election

- 1–30 August 2025
- Registered: 64,581
- Turnout: 16,013; 24.8% (▲12.3 pp)
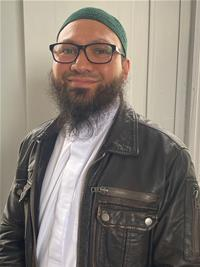

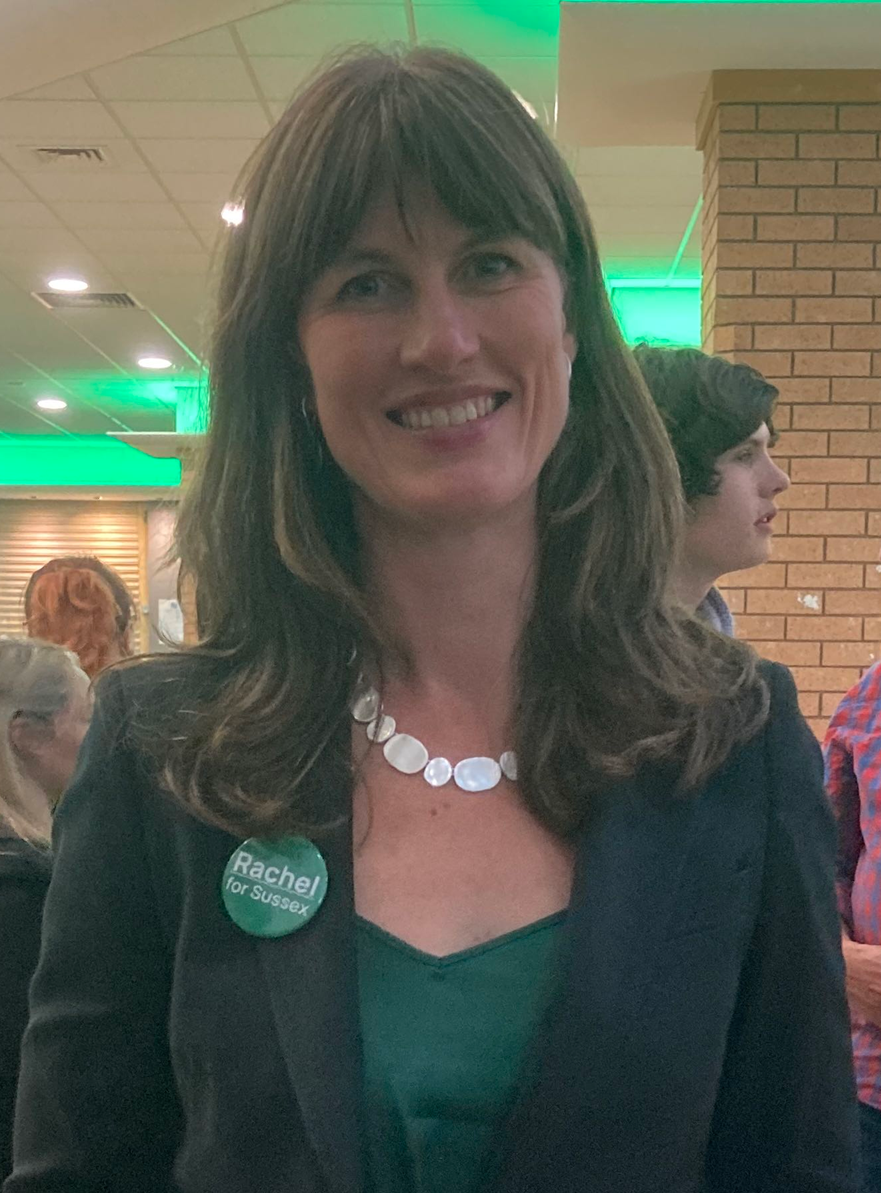

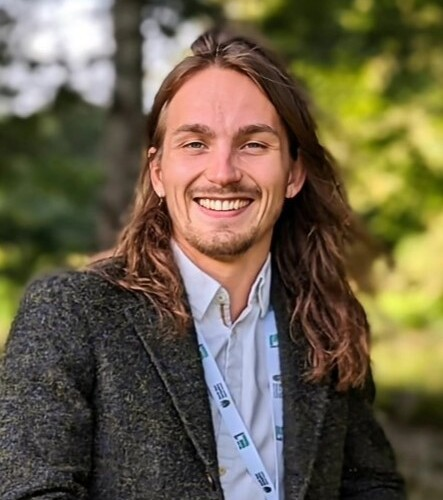

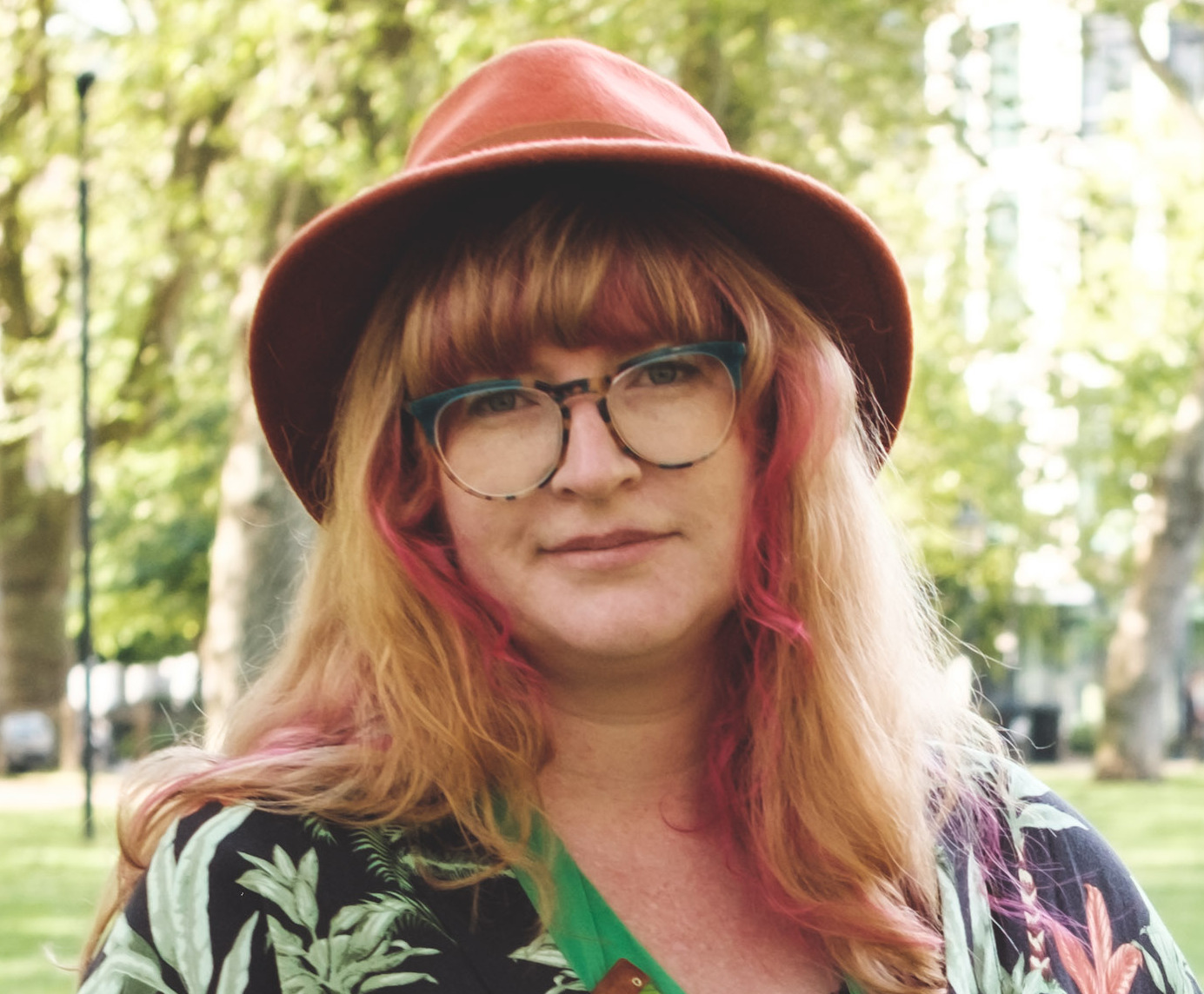

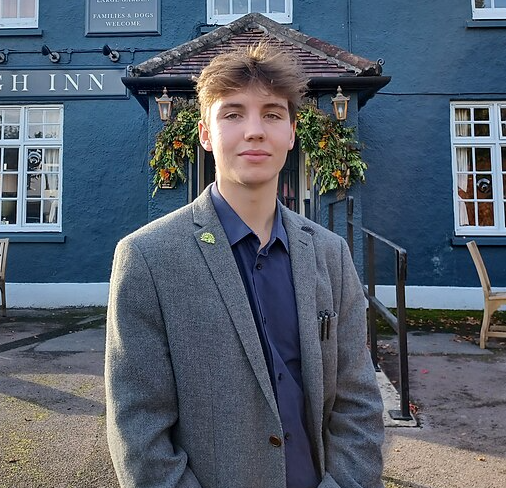

Candidate	Mothin Ali	Rachel Millward	Frank Adlington-Stringer
Percentage	33.51%	22.83%	16.03%
First round	5,366	3,656	2,567
Candidate	Antoinette Fernandez	Ani Townsend	Alex Mace
Percentage	9.09%	8.46%	3.43%
First round	1,455	1,355	549
Candidate	Ash Routh	Thomas Daw	Chas Warlow
Percentage	3.28%	1.52%	1.00%
First round	526	243	160
Deputy Leader before election
Zack Polanski
Elected Deputy Leaders
- Mothin Ali
- Rachel Millward

An internal Green Party of England of Wales election was held in August 2025 to elect either one or two deputy leaders of the party, in line with the party's constitution. It was held at the same time as the 2025 Green Party of England and Wales leadership election.

The incumbent deputy leader Zack Polanski, who had been in office since 2022, declined to run, instead running for the leadership position.

== Background ==
According to the constitution of the Green Party of England and Wales, deputy leader(s) of the party are elected every two years, at the same time as the leader(s). The election due to take place in 2024 was postponed due to the UK general election following a motion passed at the party's 2023 Autumn Conference. This election was held concurrently with other elections to the executive of the party, including the leadership.

== Electoral system ==
Candidates put themselves forward as individuals. The leader and deputy leader team must consist of three individuals in total: either two joint leaders and one deputy leader, or one leader and two joint deputy leaders. As a result, the number of deputy leaders to be elected depends on the outcome of the concurrent leadership election: if two individuals are elected as leader then only one deputy will be elected, but if only one individual is elected as leader then two deputies will be elected. In the latter scenario, the two deputy leaders must not be the same gender as each other.

The election is held under an instant-runoff voting system. In the event that two deputy leaders are required to be elected, a form of single transferable vote is used. After the election of the first deputy leader, all candidates of the same gender as the first-elected deputy leader are eliminated and their vote preferences redistributed, thereby ensuring that the second-elected deputy leader is of a different gender to the first. There is also an option to reopen nominations on the ballot.

The spending limit for candidates was £500.

== Timetable ==
2025 GPEW leadership election timetable
Date(s)	Relevant deadline/period
3 May	Notice of election published
2 June	Nominations opened (10 am BST)
30 June	Nominations closed (12 noon)
2 July	Statement of Persons Nominated published
3 July	Campaign period began
1 August	Ballots opened
30 August	Ballots closed (12 noon)
1 September	Deadline for postal ballots
2 September	Results announced

== Candidates ==
The candidate list, published 2 July, included the following 9 candidates:

Candidate	Slogan	Political office	Date announced	Campaign website	Source(s)
Frank Adlington-Stringer	Open. Honest. Direct.	Councillor for Wingerworth ward, North East Derbyshire	30 June 2025	rankfrank1st.green	
Mothin Ali	For Deputy, For You	Councillor for Gipton and Harehills, Leeds	4 June 2025	www.mothinali.com	
Thomas Daw	Building a Better Green Party	Councillor for Wrington, North Somerset	7 May 2025	www.thomasdaw4deputy.com	
Antoinette Fernandez	Antoinette for All	Candidate for Hackney North and Stoke Newington (2024); Candidate for 2024 London Assembly election, North East	6 May 2025	antoinette-fernandez	
Alex Mace	Radical hope can win	Councillor for St Stephen ward, Worcester	29 June 2025		
Rachel Millward	Hope can win	Deputy leader of Wealden District Council	10 June 2025	www.rach4deputy.com	
Ash Routh		Standing order committee member Candidate for Wakefield and Rothwell (2024)	N/A	ashrouth.com	
Ani Townsend		Councillor for Central ward, Bristol; Candidate for Bristol East (2024)	9 June 2025	anitownsend.com	
Chas Warlow		Councillor for South Richmond, Richmond upon Thames	27 June 2025		

=== Declined ===
- Zack Polanski, incumbent Deputy Leader since 2022 (ran for Leader)

== Hustings and debates ==
The debates that took place for the leadership were as follows:

Date	Title	Host	Participants									Link	Wider coverage/ source(s)
Date	Title	Host	Adlington-Stringer	Ali	Daw	Fernandez	Mace	Millward	Routh	Townsend	Warlow	Link	Wider coverage/ source(s)
24 July	Green Party Deputy Leadership Hustings 2025	Greens Organise	Present	Present	Present	Present	Present	Present	Absent	Present	Present	YouTube	

== Results ==
With Polanski elected as a single leader, two deputy leaders were to be elected. Mothin Ali was elected first after 7 rounds of vote transfers from other candidates; a second count was then calculated with all male candidates removed to ensure the second deputy leader being of a different gender to the first, in which Rachel Millward was elected. 16,013 ballots were cast.

First deputy leader position
Party	Candidate	FPv%	Count						
Party	Candidate	FPv%	1	2	3	4	5	6	7
Green	Mothin Ali	33.51%	5,366	5,379	5,402	5,575	5,865	6,344	7,151
Green	Rachel Millward	22.83%	3,656	3,676	3,701	3,820	4,138	4,654	5,988
Green	Frank Adlington-Stringer	16.03%	2,567	2,579	2,610	2,792	3,148	3,380	
Green	Antoinette Fernandez	9.09%	1,455	1,469	1,502	1,622	1,875		
Green	Ani Townsend	8.46%	1,355	1,364	1,390	1,620			
Green	Alex Mace	3.43%	549	556	571				
Green	Ashley Routh	3.28%	526	533	543				
Green	Thomas Daw	1.52%	243	250					
Green	Chas Warlow	1.00%	160						
	Re-open nominations	0.86%	136	143	143	159	199	233	356
	Exhausted votes		0	64	151	425	788	1,402	2,518
Electorate: 64,581 Valid: 16,013 Quota: 8,006.5 Turnout: 16,013

Second deputy leader position
Party	Candidate	FPv%	Count		
Party	Candidate	FPv%	1	2	3
Green	Rachel Millward	22.83%	3,656	5,842	6,022
Green	Antoinette Fernandez	9.09%	1,455	2,765	2,983
Green	Ani Townsend	8.46%	1,355	2,236	2,576
Green	Ashley Routh	3.28%	526	1,008	
Green	Mothin Ali	33.51%	5,366		
Green	Frank Adlington-Stringer	16.03%	2,567		
Green	Alex Mace	3.43%	549		
Green	Thomas Daw	1.52%	243		
Green	Chas Warlow	1.00%	160		
	Re-open nominations	0.86%	136	419	450
	Exhausted votes		0	3,743	3,982
Electorate: 64,581 Valid: 16,013 Quota: 8,006.5 Turnout: 16,013

== See also ==
- 2025 Green Party of England and Wales leadership election
- 2025 Scottish Greens co-leadership election
