= Deputy Leader of the Green Party of England and Wales =

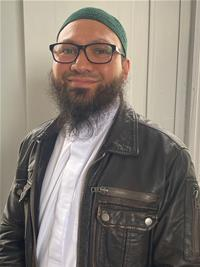

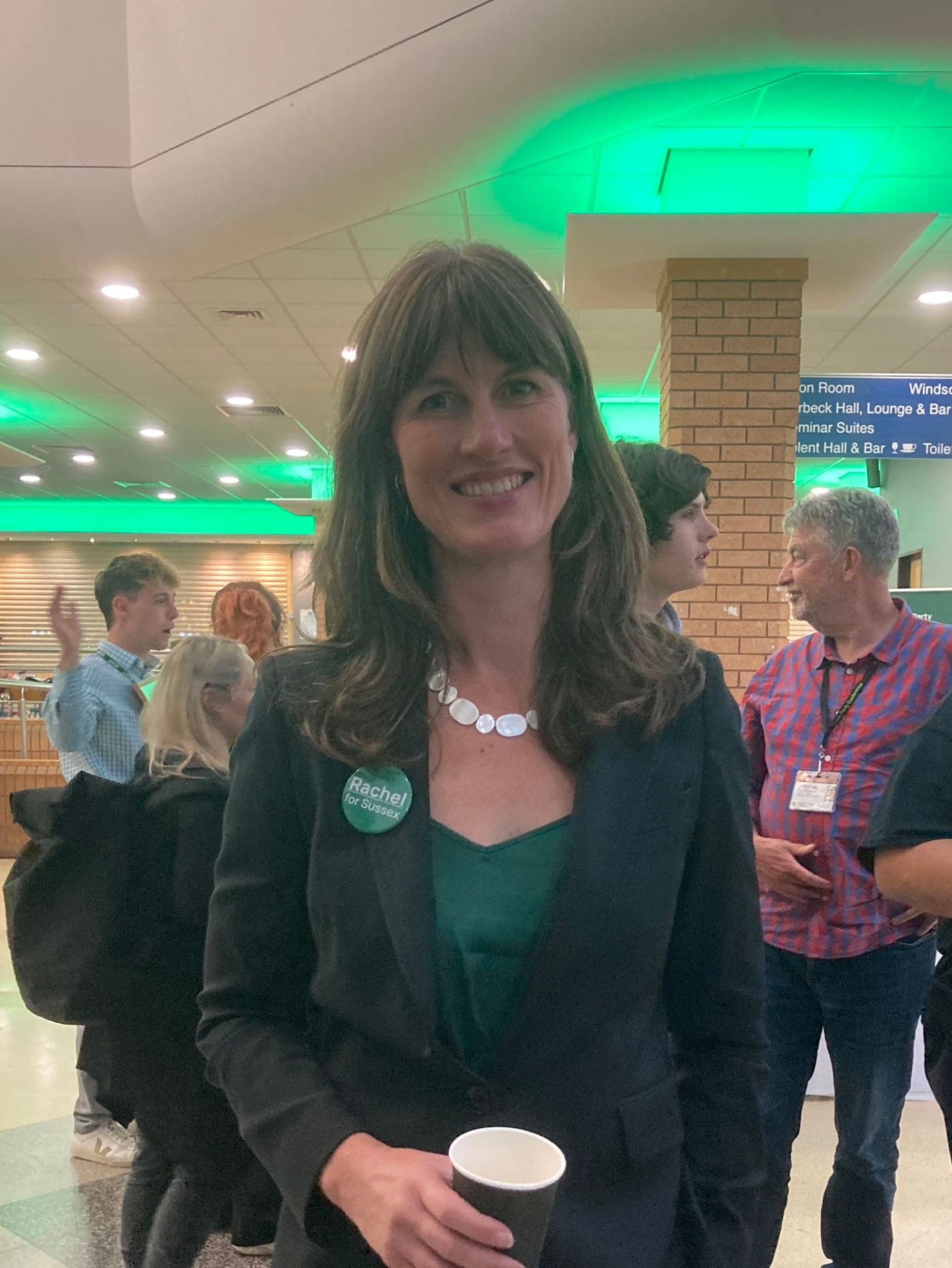
Incumbent
Mothin Ali and Rachel Millward
since 2 September 2025
- Appointer: Members of the Green Party of England and Wales; through leadership elections held biennially
- Term length: 2 years
- Precursor: Principal Speakers

The Deputy Leader of the Green Party of England and Wales is the second most senior position in the Green Party of England and Wales. Under the rules of the Green Party of England and Wales, if there are two co-leaders of the party, then there is to be a single deputy leader. If there is a single leader of the party, then there must be 2 deputy leaders of the party. Unlike the position of Leader of the Greens, individuals can not stand on joint tickets.

The deputy leader’s core purpose is to provide high-level political and organisational support across the party, including helping election candidates and local parties, representing the party in media and national forums, communicating campaigns and priorities to members, and shaping political strategy. The role sits within the party's Executive Committee (GPEx), works closely with staff (particularly press and office teams), and builds relationships both across regional and local party bodies and with external organisations. The deputy leader also plays a morale-building and ambassadorial role, is expected to model good governance and public trust, and may act as Acting Leader if required.

== History ==
Adrian Ramsay was elected unopposed as the first deputy leader of the Green Party of England and Wales on 5 September 2008. He was re-elected as Deputy Leader in the 2010 leadership election with 73.4% of the vote. He was speculated as a possible successor to the party's first leader, Caroline Lucas, but did not stand in the 2012 leadership election nor seek re-election as deputy leader.

In 2012, Will Duckworth stood for Deputy Leader in the 2012 leadership election, on a joint platform with Romayne Phoenix, who contested the party leadership. Although Phoenix was not elected, Duckworth beat Richard Mallender to become Deputy Leader.

Amelia Womack was elected deputy leader of the Green Party in September 2014, delivering her first speech in the role at the party's conference on 6 September. Having been elected at the age of 29, Womack is the youngest deputy leader of any political party in the UK.

In the 2014 leadership election, Amelia Womack and Shahrar Ali were elected as the deputy leaders, defeating Will Duckworth, and two other male candidates. Having been elected at the age of 29, Womack is the youngest deputy leader of any political party in the UK.

Amelia Womack was re-elected in the 2016 leadership election to serve a second two-year term. Sharar Ali was defeated, losing his position and coming in third place. Womack was re-elected Deputy Leader in the 2018 leadership election, and again in the 2020 leadership election.

Amelia Womack declined to stand again, and in the 2022 deputy leadership election, Zack Polanski was elected deputy leader.

In 2025, incumbent deputy leader Zack Polanski announced he was standing for leader in the 2025 leadership election. In the concurrent deputy leadership election, Mothin Ali and Rachel Millward were elected co-deputy leaders on 2 September 2025.

== List of Deputy Leaders of the Greens ==
Deputy Leaders		Took office	Left office	Elected
Adrian Ramsay		5 September 2008	3 September 2012	2008; 2010
Will Duckworth		3 September 2012	1 September 2014	2012
Amelia Womack	Shahrar Ali	7 September 2014	31 August 2016	2014
Amelia Womack		4 September 2018	7 September 2022	2016; 2018; 2020
Zack Polanski		7 September 2022	2 September 2025	2022
Mothin Ali	Rachel Millward	2 September 2025	Incumbent	2025

== See also ==
- 2022 Green Party of England and Wales deputy leadership election
- 2025 Green Party of England and Wales deputy leadership election
- Deputy Leader of the Conservative Party (UK)
- Deputy Leader of the Labour Party (UK)
- Deputy Leader of the Liberal Democrats
- Leader of the Green Party of England and Wales
