= Gipton and Harehills (ward) =

Electoral ward in Leeds, England

- Gipton and Harehills highlighted within Leeds
- Population: 17,961 (2023 electorate)
- Metropolitan borough: City of Leeds
- Metropolitan county: West Yorkshire
- Region: Yorkshire and the Humber
- Country: England
- Sovereign state: United Kingdom
- UK Parliament: Leeds East
- Councillors: Asghar Ali (Labour); Mothin Ali (Green); Salma Arif (Labour)

Gipton and Harehills is an electoral ward of Leeds City Council in east Leeds, West Yorkshire, covering the inner-city area of Harehills and residential suburb of Gipton.

== Councillors ==
Election	Councillor	Councillor	Councillor
2004	Alan Taylor (LD) (Note: Taylor had been a councillor for Harehills ward since 1999.)	Javaid Akhtar (LD) (Note: Akhtar had been a Harehills ward councillor since winning a by-election in April 2000.)	Roger Harington (Lab) (Note: Harington had been a councillor for Harehills ward since 2002.)
2006	Alan Taylor (LD)	Javaid Akhtar (LD) (Note: Akhtar lost the next election in 2007 and, after switching parties, was later elected as a Labour councillor for Hyde Park and Woodhouse ward in 2010. He went on to be elected for Little London and Woodhouse ward in 2018.)	Roger Harington (Lab)
2007	Alan Taylor (LD)	Arif Hussain (Lab)	Roger Harington (Lab)
2008	Alan Taylor (LD)	Arif Hussain (Lab)	Roger Harington (Lab)
2010	Alan Taylor (LD)	Arif Hussain (Lab)	Kamila Maqsood (Lab)
2011	Alan Taylor (LD)	Arif Hussain (Lab)	Kamila Maqsood (Lab)
2012	Roger Harington (Lab)	Arif Hussain (Lab)	Kamila Maqsood (Lab)
2014	Roger Harington (Lab)	Arif Hussain (Lab)	Kamila Maqsood (Lab)
2015	Roger Harington (Lab)	Arif Hussain (Lab)	Kamila Maqsood (Lab)
2016	Salma Arif (Lab)	Arif Hussain (Lab)	Kamila Maqsood (Lab)
2018	Salma Arif (Lab)	Arif Hussain (Lab)	Kamila Maqsood (Lab)
2019	Salma Arif (Lab)	Arif Hussain (Lab)	Kamila Maqsood (Lab)
2021	Salma Arif (Lab)	Arif Hussain (Lab)	Kamila Maqsood (Lab)
2022	Salma Arif (Lab)	Arif Hussain (Lab)	Kamila Maqsood (Lab)
2023	Salma Arif (Lab)	Arif Hussain (Lab)	Asghar Ali (Lab)
2024	Salma Arif (Lab)	Mothin Ali (GPEW)	Asghar Ali (Lab)
2026	Salma Arif* (Lab)	Mothin Ali* (GPEW)	Asghar Ali* (Lab)

indicates seat up for re-election. * indicates incumbent councillor.

== Elections since 2010 ==
=== May 2026 ===
2026
Party	Candidate	Votes	%	±%
Labour Co-op	Salma Arif*	2,345	36.9	−2.1
Green	Khizer Qayyum	1,936	30.5	−21.1
Independent	Arif Hussain	1,108	17.4	New
Reform	Callum Bushrod	612	9.6	New
Conservative	Patricia Jones	174	2.7	−2.1
Liberal Democrats	Jack Glover	104	1.6	−1.0
TUSC	Iain Dalton	30	0.5	−1.5
SDP	Andrew Martin	29	0.5	New
UKIP	Andy Nix	17	0.3	New
Majority		409	6.4	−6.2
Turnout		6,382	36.3	+3.2
Labour hold		Swing	+9.5	

=== May 2024 ===
2024
Party	Candidate	Votes	%	±%
Green	Mothin Ali	3,070	51.6	+20.4
Labour	Arif Hussain*	2,323	39.0	−16.9
Conservative	Liam Roberts	285	4.8	−2.1
Liberal Democrats	Thomas Race	156	2.6	−0.7
TUSC	Iain Dalton	120	2.0	−0.5
Majority		747	12.6	−12.0
Turnout		5,954	33.1	+6.6
Green gain from Labour		Swing	+18.7	

=== May 2023 ===
2023
Party	Candidate	Votes	%	±%
Labour	Asghar Ali	2,655	55.9	−4.6
Green	Mothin Ali	1,484	31.2	+8.9
Conservative	Robert Harris	310	6.9	−3.2
Liberal Democrats	Mark Twitchett	156	3.3	−1.3
TUSC	Iain Dalton	121	2.5	+0.7
Majority		1,171	24.6	−13.7
Turnout		4,751	26.5	+1.2
Labour hold		Swing		

=== May 2022 ===
2022
Party	Candidate	Votes	%	±%
Labour	Salma Arif*	2,722	60.5	−12.9
Green	Mothin Ali	1,001	22.3	+16.2
Conservative	Robert Harris	454	10.1	−1.6
Liberal Democrats	Aqila Choudhry	206	4.6	+0.5
TUSC	Tanis Belsham-Wray	82	1.8	−0.8
Majority		1,721	38.3	−23.3
Turnout		4,498	25.3	−4.6
Labour hold		Swing		

=== May 2021 ===
2021
Party	Candidate	Votes	%	±%
Labour	Arif Hussain*	3,854	73.4	−4.2
Conservative	Sandy Goodall	616	11.7	+5.4
Green	Alaric Hall	318	6.1	−0.4
Liberal Democrats	Darren Finlay	214	4.1	−0.5
TUSC	Iain Dalton	139	2.6	+0.0
SDP	Shaff Sheikh	113	2.2	−0.2
Majority		3,238	61.6	−9.6
Turnout		5,254	29.9	+3.3
Labour hold		Swing		

=== May 2019 ===
2019
Party	Candidate	Votes	%	±%
Labour	Kamila Maqsood*	3,426	77.6	+8.1
Green	Lynne Caulfield	286	6.5	−0.3
Conservative	Robert Harris	276	6.3	−0.8
Liberal Democrats	Ashley Mark Cresswell	206	4.7	−1.7
Socialist	Iain Dalton	113	2.6	−3.5
SDP	Shaff Sheikh	108	2.4	+2.4
Majority		3,140	71.1	+8.7
Turnout		4,475	26.6	−4.7
Labour hold		Swing	+4.2	

=== May 2018 ===
2018
Party	Candidate	Votes	%	±%
Labour	Salma Arif*	4,020	69.5	−9.5
Labour	Arif Hussain*	3,797		
Labour	Kamila Maqsood*	3,524		
Conservative	Robert Harris	411	7.1	+1.9
Green	Colin Noble	394	6.8	+4.2
Liberal Democrats	Heidi Farrar	370	6.4	+1.5
TUSC	Iain Dalton	357	6.1	+4.9
Conservative	Matthew Labbee	323		
Independent	Shaff Sheikh	269	4.6	N/A
Conservative	Vajinder Singh	218		
Majority		3,609	62.4	−9.4
Turnout		16,564	31.3	−1.3
Labour hold		Swing		
Labour hold		Swing		
Labour hold		Swing		

=== May 2016 ===
2016
Party	Candidate	Votes	%	±%
Labour	Salma Arif	3,972	79.0	+5.1
UKIP	Khalil Mohammed Kungulilo	360	7.2	−3.6
Conservative	Beatrice Greenwood	263	5.2	−1.4
Liberal Democrats	Margaret Sandra Tait	245	4.9	+0.0
Green	Rhian Margaret Williams	130	2.6	−1.2
TUSC	Tanis Izabelle Belsham-Wray	60	1.2	+1.2
Majority		3,612	71.8	+8.7
Turnout		5,030	32.6	
Labour hold		Swing		

=== May 2015 ===
2015
Party	Candidate	Votes	%	±%
Labour	Arif Hussain*	6,187	73.9	−6.3
UKIP	Marvin Kushman	904	10.8	+10.8
Conservative	Joshua Harvey	554	6.6	−1.1
Liberal Democrats	Adam Douglas	413	4.9	−3.5
Green	Peter Phizacklea	319	3.8	+3.8
Majority		5,283	63.1	−8.6
Turnout		8,377	51.5	
Labour hold		Swing	-8.6	

=== May 2014 ===
2014
Party	Candidate	Votes	%	±%
Labour	Kamila Maqsood*	3,756	76.1	
Liberal Democrats	Adam Douglas	403	8.2	
Conservative	Beatrice Greenwood	393	8.0	
Green	Neil Seepujak	381	7.7	
Majority		3,353		
Turnout		4933	31.55	
Labour hold		Swing		

=== May 2012 ===
2012
Party	Candidate	Votes	%	±%
Labour	Roger Harington	3,900	71.7	−8.5
Liberal Democrats	Abdul Abedin	997	18.3	+9.9
Conservative	Beatrice Greenwood	325	6.0	−1.7
Alliance for Green Socialism	Azar Iqbal	217	4.0	+0.3
Majority		2,903	53.4	−18.3
Turnout		5,439		
Labour gain from Liberal Democrats		Swing	-9.2	

=== May 2011 ===
2011
Party	Candidate	Votes	%	±%
Labour	Arif Hussain*	4,805	80.2	+19.8
Liberal Democrats	Qadeer Khan	506	8.4	−16.1
Conservative	Beatrice Greenwood	462	7.7	+0.2
Alliance for Green Socialism	Azar Iqbal	220	3.7	+1.9
Majority		4,299	71.7	+35.9
Turnout		5,993	38	
Labour hold		Swing	+17.9	

=== May 2010 ===
2010
Party	Candidate	Votes	%	±%
Labour	Kamila Maqsood	5,179	60.3	+18.0
Liberal Democrats	Tasadaq Hussain	2,105	24.5	−18.3
Conservative	Beatrice Greenwood	642	7.5	+3.9
BNP	Anthony Wall	503	5.9	−0.6
Alliance for Green Socialism	Azar Iqbal	153	1.8	+0.4
Majority		3,074	35.8	+35.3
Turnout		8,582	57.5	+19.3
Labour hold		Swing	+18.1	

== See also ==
- Listed buildings in Leeds (Gipton and Harehills Ward)
