= Rachel Millward =

British politician (born 1977)

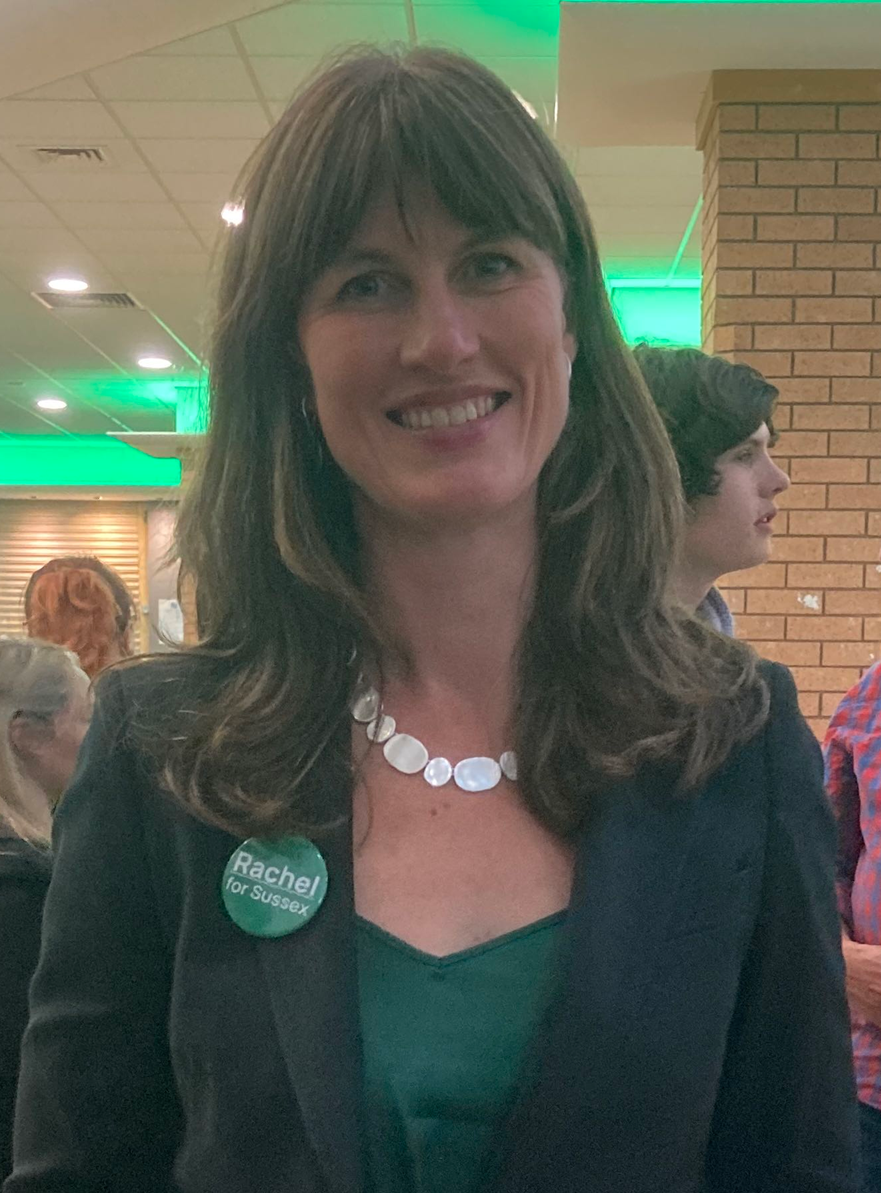
- Millward in 2025

Deputy Leader of the Green Party of England and Wales
- Incumbent
- Assumed office 2 September 2025 Serving with Mothin Ali
- Leader: Zack Polanski
- Preceded by: Zack Polanski

Leader of Wealden District Council (Note: The Liberal Democrats, Green Party and Labour run the council in a coalition, in which Millward and the Liberal Democrat James Partridge swap leader and deputy roles every year in a de facto co-leadership.)
- Incumbent
- Assumed office 14 May 2026
- Preceded by: James Partridge
- In office 15 May 2024 – 14 May 2025 Serving with James Partridge
- Preceded by: Ann Newton
- Succeeded by: James Partridge

Deputy Leader of Wealden District Council
- In office 14 May 2025 – 14 May 2026 Serving with James Partridge
- Preceded by: James Partridge
- Succeeded by: James Partridge
- In office 24 May 2023 – 15 May 2024 Serving with James Partridge
- Preceded by: Philip Lunn
- Succeeded by: James Partridge

Wealden District Councillor for Hartfield
- Incumbent
- Assumed office 2 December 2021
- Preceded by: Chris Hardy
- Majority: 318 (25.8%)

Personal details
- Born: Rachel Hannah Millward; 11 January 1977 (age 49) West Midlands, England
- Party: Green Party of England and Wales
- Children: 2
- Education: University of Oxford (BA); University of Cape Town (MA)
- Website: https://rachelforsussex.co.uk/

Rachel Hannah Millward (born 11 January 1977) is a British politician currently serving as Deputy Leader of the Green Party of England and Wales since September 2025, alongside Mothin Ali. She has also served as the Wealden District Councillor for Hartfield since 2021 and co-leader of the council since 2023. Millward is the Green Party candidate for Mayor of Sussex and Brighton in the 2028 mayoral election.

== Early life and education ==
Millward was born on 11 January 1977 in the West Midlands to Maurice and Sheila Millward. She has two sisters and two brothers. Millward attended King Henry VIII School, a private school in Coventry. She then graduated with a bachelor's degree in theology from the University of Oxford in 1999 before completing a master's programme in gender and development from the African Gender Institute at the University of Cape Town in 2001.

== Media career ==
Millward initially worked as a researcher for independent film and television productions. She then founded the Birds Eye View film festival with Pinny Grylls in 2002 to showcase films made by women. Millward served as the festival's director until 2014, and the festival has since evolved into the charity Reclaim the Frame. In August 2006, Millward was nominated as a "world changing woman" by The Guardian for her work with Birds Eye View.

In 2009, she was awarded a fellowship by the Clore Duffield Foundation as part of their leadership programme and was nominated in the media category at the Women of the Future awards. From 2014 to 2016, Millward was the arts director at The Old Church in Stoke Newington. She then served as an executive director at Sam Lee's Nest Collective from 2016 to 2020.

== Political career ==
Millward ran as the Green Party candidate in the 2021 by-election for the Hartfield seat on Wealden District Council, following the death of councillor Chris Hardy. She won the seat by 122 votes against the Conservative Party candidate Bruce Rainbow, gaining the seat from the Conservatives. Millward retained her seat in the 2023 Wealden District Council election, with an increased majority of 318. She was appointed joint-leader of the council in May 2023 alongside the Liberal Democrat councillor James Partridge, as part of a coalition agreement between the two parties. As leader, she has focused on improving the district’s sport and leisure provision and ensured investment in nature restoration.

In July 2023, Millward was selected as the Green Party's prospective candidate for the constituency of Sussex Weald, but withdrew in May 2024 over concerns about being both a parliamentary candidate and leader of the council. In June 2025, Millward announced her candidacy for the Green Party deputy leadership election. Due to Zack Polanski winning the leadership election, Millward and Mothin Ali were elected as joint–deputy leaders, as the Green Party constitution stipulates that if there is a singular leader, there must be two deputy leaders.

In October 2025, Millward was selected as the Green Party candidate for Mayor of Sussex and Brighton for the 2028 mayoral election.

== Personal life ==
Millward lives in Hartfield with her husband and two children. Her elder daughter was born on the opening day of the 2010 Birds Eye View film festival.

== Electoral performance ==
=== Wealden District Council ===
2023 Wealden District Council election: Hartfield
Party	Candidate	Votes	%	±%
Green	Rachel Millward	774	62.9	+19.8
Conservative	Janie Robinson	456	37.1	−19.8
Majority		318	25.8	
Turnout		1,230	43.2	+7.4
Green hold		Swing	+19.8	

Hartfield by-election: 2 December 2021
Party	Candidate	Votes	%	±%
Green	Rachel Millward	589	55.8	+12.7
Conservative	Bruce Rainbow	467	44.2	−12.7
Majority		122	11.6	
Turnout		1,056		
Green gain from Conservative		Swing	+25.4	

=== Deputy leader of the Green Party of England and Wales ===
2025 Green Party of England and Wales deputy leadership election
Party	Candidate	FPv%	Count						
Party	Candidate	FPv%	1	2	3	4	5	6	7
Green	Mothin Ali	33.51%	5,366	5,337.67					
Green	Rachel Millward	22.83%	3,656	3,665.36	3,685.42	3,712.56	3,854.01	4,260.24	5,003.24
Green	Frank Adlington-Stringer	16.03%	2,567	2,570.82	2,583.84	2,618.02	2,839.60	3,274.42	3,642.42
Green	Antoinette Fernandez	9.09%	1,455	1,460.96	1,480.01	1,516.10	1,683.86	1,997.67	0
Green	Ani Townsend	8.46%	1,355	1,358.43	1,368.47	1,397.58	1,654.18	0	
Green	Alex Mace	3.43%	549	550.41	557.43	575.51	0		
Green	Ashley Routh	3.28%	526	527.70	535.73	549.80	0		
Green	Thomas Daw	1.52%	243	243.87	251.87	0			
Green	Chas Warlow	1.00%	160	160.30	0				
	Re-open nominations	0.86%	136	137.44	145.47	148.50	166.65	222.86	287.86
	Exhausted votes		0	0.99	67.05	157.21	476.99	920.12	1734.12
Valid: 16,013 Quota: 5,337.67 Turnout: 16,013

== Notes ==
Party political offices
Preceded by Zack Polanski	Deputy Leader of the Green Party of England and Wales; 2025–present With: Mothin Ali	Incumbent
