= Mothin Ali =

British politician

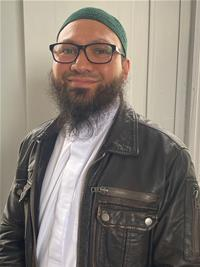
- Official portrait, 2024

Deputy Leader of the Green Party of England and Wales
- Incumbent
- Assumed office 2 September 2025 Serving with Rachel Millward
- Leader: Zack Polanski
- Preceded by: Zack Polanski

Leeds City Councillor for Gipton and Harehills
- Incumbent
- Assumed office 3 May 2024
- Preceded by: Arif Hussain

Personal details
- Born: Mothin Mohammed Ali; 12 January 1982 (age 44) Sheffield, South Yorkshire, England
- Party: Green Party of England and Wales (since 2020)
- Other political affiliations: Labour (2000–2020)
- Education: Leeds Beckett University (BSc)
- Occupation: Politician; Islamic teacher; accountant

YouTube information
- Channel: My Family Garden
- Years active: 2017–present
- Subscribers: 56,800
- Views: 4.7 million
- Last updated: 31 October 2026

Mothin Mohammed Ali (/ˈmɔːtiːn/ /ɑːˈliː/; born 12 January 1982) is a British politician serving as Deputy Leader of the Green Party of England and Wales, alongside Rachel Millward, since September 2025. He has also served as a member of Leeds City Council for Gipton and Harehills since 2024.

== Early life ==
Ali was born on 12 January 1982 in Sheffield, South Yorkshire and he is of Bangladeshi descent. His family moved to the UK in the 1960s, and his father worked as a unionised steelworker in Sheffield.

In 2000, Ali moved to the Gipton and Harehills area of Leeds.

== Political career ==
=== Move from Labour to Green Party (2020) ===
Ali joined the Labour Party at the age of eighteen, but left and joined the Green Party in 2020, following the beginning of Keir Starmer's leadership of the Labour Party.

=== Leeds City Council (2024–present) ===
Ali began campaigning for local election as the Green Party candidate for the Gipton and Harehills ward of Leeds City Council in 2022; this was one of the UK's poorest areas, 40% of whose population was Muslim, with over 65% coming from minority ethnic groups.

Ali was elected in the 2024 Leeds City Council election. Ali and political commentators said the win was a sign of local voters' dissatisfaction with the Labour Party's stance on the Gaza war. Ali said his local election victory was a win for the people of Gaza amidst the Israeli invasion stating: "We will not be silenced. We will raise the voice of Gaza. We will raise the voice of Palestine," before shouting the Takbir ("Allāhu ʾAkbar"). Following public criticism and subsequent investigation, Ali issued an apology for any distress caused and stated his intention to work jointly with Jewish Greens and Muslim Greens to discuss how to promote an end to the Gaza War. In later interviews, he noted that he had experienced extensive harassment following media coverage of the incident, including the puncturing of his car tyres, and 5Pillars reported that he had required police protection.

As a member of the Greens for Palestine group, Ali supported a party's policy to label the Israeli government's conduct in the Gaza war as apartheid and genocide and associated boycott, divestment and sanctions movement. Ali made a prominent speech promoting this policy at the Green Party's annual conference in September 2024, and the party accepted the proposed policy change.

As a local councillor, Ali campaigned against the planned council's policy to close a number of council-run nurseries and campaigned for improved public consultation regarding changes to road layouts in his ward.

In August 2026, a Private Eye investigation revealed that Ali received a council Special Responsibility Allowance (SRA) without any additional responsibilities attached. Some other Leeds Green Councillors called on Ali and Group Leader Penny Stables to have the party whip suspended.

=== Green Party Deputy Leader (2025–present) ===
Prior to his local election, Ali was also selected as the Green Party candidate for the deputy Mayor of West Yorkshire for 2024 West Yorkshire mayoral election in which the Greens came third.

In June 2025, Ali announced his candidacy in the 2025 Green Party of England and Wales deputy leadership election. He was subsequently got elected in September that year. During his campaign, party member raised questions regarding his stance and perceived lack of support for LGBTQ issues. Ali was the sole candidate who declined to sign a pro-LGBTQ pledge, stating that he chose not to sign any pledges from any special interest groups. Ali in an interview declined to state whether he believed that trans women are women, but has also stated that Muslims and LGBTQ people should "come together" as minority communities targeted by the far-right.

== Campaigns and activism ==
=== Harehills riot ===
During the 2024 Harehills riot, Ali formed what he called "a human shield" to stop violence escalating and appealed for calm. Ali was erroneously accused of taking part in the unrest by some far-right political commentators. A GB News presenter and a social media commentator later paid damages to Ali after he sued them for defamation. The Muslim Council of Britain commended Ali for his "bravery and service" during the unrest. Following the unrest, Ali organised community meetings, particularly developing his contacts with the local Roma community.

=== DigItOut campaign ===
Ali is an anti-racism campaigner. He started the DigItOut campaign, which aims to end racism in horticulture. This was a response to his own experiences of racism in the gardening world, including abuse he received on his YouTube channel, which worsened after the publication in 2021 of the findings of the Commission on Race and Ethnic Disparities. He is a long-standing critic of the UK government's Prevent counter-terrorism strategy, arguing that it embeds Islamophobia. In the wake of the 2024 United Kingdom riots, Ali criticised the racism of their perpetrators while also criticising what he saw as growing media and government encouragement of racist attitudes, and particularly Islamophobia, in the UK. As of 2024, he was campaigning to make Leeds what he called a "city of belonging", modelled on the concept of a City of Sanctuary.

== Personal life ==
Ali is a Muslim. As of 2022, he worked as an accountant during the day and taught Islamic studies in the evenings.

=== Horticulture ===
Ali has a YouTube channel, "My Family Garden", which in 2022 had 35,000 subscribers and 50,000 in 2024, where he documents his gardening. In 2022, he was featured on the BBC programmes Marcus Wareing's Tales from a Kitchen Garden and Blossom Trees and Burnt Out Cars; in the same year he began craft production of achar made from home-grown ingredients.

=== Business interests ===
Ali is the sole director of MA Holdings, a limited company which holds two buy-to-let properties in Leeds, although Ali does not appear to profit from either of them. The purchase of properties occurred before the Green Party's October 2025 policy of phasing out private landlord ownership. The Green party stated that he had acted in the interests of vulnerable family members but declined to disclose further details, citing family privacy

== Electoral performance ==
=== May 2024 ===
2024 Leeds City Council election, Gipton and Harehills
Party	Candidate	Votes	%	±%
Green	Mothin Ali	3,070	51.6	+20.4
Labour	Arif Hussain*	2,323	39.0	−16.9
Conservative	Liam Roberts	285	4.8	−2.1
Liberal Democrats	Thomas Race	156	2.6	−0.7
TUSC	Iain Dalton	120	2.0	−0.5
Majority		747	12.6	−12.0
Turnout		5,954	33.1	+6.6
Green gain from Labour		Swing	+18.7	

=== May 2023 ===
2023 Leeds City Council election, Gipton and Harehills
Party	Candidate	Votes	%	±%
Labour	Asghar Ali	2,655	55.9	−4.6
Green	Mothin Ali	1,484	31.2	+8.9
Conservative	Robert Harris	310	6.9	−3.2
Liberal Democrats	Mark Twitchett	156	3.3	−1.3
TUSC	Iain Dalton	121	2.5	+0.7
Majority		1,171	24.6	−13.7
Turnout		4,751	26.5	+1.2
Labour hold		Swing		

=== May 2022 ===
2022 Leeds City Council election, Gipton and Harehills
Party	Candidate	Votes	%	±%
Labour	Salma Arif*	2,722	60.5	−12.9
Green	Mothin Ali	1,001	22.3	+16.2
Conservative	Robert Harris	454	10.1	−1.6
Liberal Democrats	Aqila Choudhry	206	4.6	+0.5
TUSC	Tanis Belsham-Wray	82	1.8	−0.8
Majority		1,721	38.3	−23.3
Turnout		4,498	25.3	−4.6
Labour hold		Swing		

Party political offices
Preceded by Zack Polanski	Deputy Leader of the Green Party of England and Wales; 2025–present With: Rachel Millward	Incumbent
