= Herefordshire Council elections =

Local government elections in Herefordshire, England

Herefordshire Council elections are held every four years. Herefordshire Council is the local authority for the unitary authority and ceremonial county of Herefordshire in England. Since the last boundary changes in 2015, 53 councillors have been elected from 53 wards.

== Council elections ==
- 1997 Herefordshire Council election
- 2000 Herefordshire Council election
- 2003 Herefordshire Council election (new ward boundaries)
- 2007 Herefordshire Council election
- 2011 Herefordshire Council election
- 2015 Herefordshire Council election (new ward boundaries)
- 2019 Herefordshire Council election
- 2023 Herefordshire Council election

== Results maps ==
2003 results map

2007 results map

2011 results map

2015 results map

2019 results map

2023 results map

== By-election results ==
=== 1997–2000 ===
Weobley By-Election 26 March 1998
Party	Candidate	Votes	%	±%
Independent		333	35.5	
Liberal Democrats		284	30.3	
Conservative		234	24.9	
Labour		62	6.6	
Green		25	2.4	
Majority		49	5.2	
Turnout		938	38.5	
Independent gain from Liberal Democrats		Swing		

Holmer By-Election 11 February 1999
Party	Candidate	Votes	%	±%
Liberal Democrats		375	35.6	−22.1
Labour		349	33.2	+12.4
Conservative		220	20.9	+0.6
Independent		108	10.3	+10.3
Majority		26	2.4	
Turnout		1,052	19.4	
Liberal Democrats hold		Swing		

Hope End By-Election 20 May 1999
Party	Candidate	Votes	%	±%
Conservative		736	49.5	+24.0
Liberal Democrats		312	21.0	−5.9
Independent		221	14.9	−9.5
Green		148	10.0	−3.0
Labour		69	4.6	−5.6
Majority		424	28.5	
Turnout		1,486		
Conservative hold		Swing		

Three Elms By-Election 18 November 1999
Party	Candidate	Votes	%	±%
Conservative		517	53.1	+31.5
Liberal Democrats		283	29.1	−29.7
Labour		135	13.7	−5.9
Green		39	4.0	+4.0
Majority		234	24.0	
Turnout		974	21.7	
Conservative gain from Liberal Democrats		Swing		

=== 2000–2003 ===
St Martin's By-Election 7 June 2001
Party	Candidate	Votes	%	±%
Labour		743	42.5	+8.7
Liberal Democrats		566	32.3	−6.5
Conservative		296	16.9	+4.0
Independent		145	8.3	+8.3
Majority		177	10.2	
Turnout		1,750		
Labour gain from Liberal Democrats		Swing		

=== 2003–2007 ===
St Nicholas By-Election 22 January 2004
Party	Candidate	Votes	%	±%
Liberal Democrats	Fiona Short	936	37.0	−7.6
Conservative	John Ward	783	30.9	+9.4
Independent	Julie Woodward	524	20.7	−13.2
Labour	John Hitchin	288	11.4	+11.4
Majority		153	6.1	
Turnout		2,531	52.5	
Liberal Democrats hold		Swing		

Tupsley By-Election 1 December 2005
Party	Candidate	Votes	%	±%
Liberal Democrats	Elizabeth Taylor	831	44.0	+8.7
Conservative	John Perris	608	32.2	+8.4
Independent	Guy Griffiths	274	14.5	−15.4
Labour	John Oliver	118	6.3	+6.3
Independent	Richard Thomas	56	3.0	+3.0
Majority		223	11.8	
Turnout		1,887	27.0	
Liberal Democrats gain from Independent		Swing		

Kerne Bridge By-Election 1 June 2006
Party	Candidate	Votes	%	±%
Conservative	John Jarvis	482	41.6	+8.2
Liberal Democrats	Paul Truman	308	26.6	+26.6
Independent		249	21.5	−45.1
Independent		119	10.3	+10.3
Majority		174	15.0	
Turnout		1,158	47.2	
Conservative gain from Independent		Swing		

=== 2007–2011 ===
Old Gore By-Election 10 April 2008
Party	Candidate	Votes	%	±%
Conservative	Barry Durkin	422	37.9	−8.1
Independent	John Gartside	401	36.0	−1.8
Liberal Democrats	Josephine Lane	241	21.7	+5.4
Green	Adrian Worgan	49	4.4	+4.4
Majority		21	1.9	
Turnout		1,113	46.0	
Conservative hold		Swing		

Leominster South By-Election 2 October 2008
Party	Candidate	Votes	%	±%
Independent	Peter McCaull	515	41.4	+41.4
Conservative	Keith Miles	397	31.9	−12.2
Green	Joan Thwaites	200	16.1	−4.9
Liberal Democrats	Matt Lane	131	10.5	−3.7
Majority		118	9.5	
Turnout		1,243		
Independent gain from Conservative		Swing		

Hope End By-Election 6 May 2010
Party	Candidate	Votes	%	±%
Conservative	Tony Johnson	1,703	50.8	−0.6
Liberal Democrats	Barry Ashton	1,651	49.2	+25.2
Majority		52	1.6	
Turnout		3,354		
Conservative hold		Swing		

Ledbury By-Election 6 May 2010
Party	Candidate	Votes	%	±%
Conservative	Phil Bettington	2,438	49.6	+13.7
Liberal Democrats	Michael Gogan	1,769	36.0	+10.9
Independent	Robert Wilson	713	14.5	+14.5
Majority		669	13.6	
Turnout		4,920		
Conservative hold		Swing		

St Nicholas By-Election 14 October 2010
Party	Candidate	Votes	%	±%
It's Our County	Justin Lavender	589	45.2	+45.2
Liberal Democrats	Anthony Murphy	385	29.5	+8.5
Independent	Colin Mears	173	13.3	+13.3
Conservative	Vivienne Jones	156	12.0	−7.2
Majority		204	15.7	
Turnout		1,303		
It's Our County gain from Independent		Swing		

=== 2011–2015 ===
St Nicholas By-Election 20 September 2012
Party	Candidate	Votes	%	±%
It's Our County	Anthony Powers	604	53.3	+8.6
Liberal Democrats	David Hurds	222	19.6	+2.2
Conservative	Mark McEvilly	204	18.0	−5.0
Labour	Stan Gyford	104	9.2	−5.7
Majority		382	33.7	
Turnout		1,134		
It's Our County hold		Swing		

Ross-on-Wye West By-Election 24 January 2013
Party	Candidate	Votes	%	±%
Conservative	Richard Mayo	695	54.4	+21.8
Independent	David Ravenscroft	312	24.4	+24.4
Liberal Democrats	Caroline Bennett	270	21.1	−12.6
Majority		383	30.0	
Turnout		1,277		
Conservative hold		Swing		

Tupsley By-Election 7 November 2013
Party	Candidate	Votes	%	±%
It's Our County	Cath North	987	61.3	+11.7
Conservative	Jason Kay	347	21.5	+0.7
Liberal Democrats	Duncan Fraser	277	17.2	−0.7
Majority		640	39.7	
Turnout		1,611		
It's Our County hold		Swing		

Pontrilas By-Election 21 November 2013
Party	Candidate	Votes	%	±%
It's Our County	Jon Norris	429	46.7	+25.4
Independent	Elaine Godding	261	28.4	−4.2
Conservative	Elissa Swinglehurst	229	24.9	−21.2
Majority		168	18.3	
Turnout		919		
It's Our County gain from Conservative		Swing		

Ledbury By-Election 17 July 2014
Party	Candidate	Votes	%	±%
It's Our County	Terry Widdows	835	51.6	+16.8
Conservative	Allen Conway	618	38.2	+0.3
UKIP	Paul Stanford	166	10.3	+10.3
Majority		217	13.4	
Turnout		1,619		
It's Our County gain from Conservative		Swing		

Leominster South By-Election 17 July 2014
Party	Candidate	Votes	%	±%
Green	Jennifer Bartlett	384	37.9	+24.2
Conservative	Wayne Rosser	222	21.9	−18.2
Independent	Angela Pendleton	198	19.5	+19.5
UKIP	Liz Portman-Lewis	111	10.9	+10.9
Labour	Emma Pardoe	99	9.8	−2.8
Majority		162	16.0	
Turnout		1,014		
Green gain from Conservative		Swing		

=== 2015–2019 ===
Leominster South By-Election 23 March 2017
Party	Candidate	Votes	%	±%
Green	Trish Marsh	318	40.8	+10.1
It's Our County	Jon Stannard	143	18.3	+18.3
Conservative	Connor Egan	139	17.8	−8.7
Independent	Mark Latimer	116	14.9	+14.9
Liberal Democrats	Clive Thomas	64	8.2	+8.2
Majority		175	22.4	
Turnout		780		
Green gain from Independent		Swing		

Golden Valley South By-Election 7 September 2017
Party	Candidate	Votes	%	±%
Independent	Peter Jinman	462	42.7	+42.7
Conservative	Simeon Cole	254	23.5	−42.3
Independent	Richard Baker	152	14.1	+14.1
Green	Jeremy Milln	109	10.1	−7.1
Labour	Anna Coda	104	9.6	+9.6
Majority		208	19.2	
Turnout		1,081		
Independent gain from Conservative		Swing		

Kings Acre By-Election 26 October 2017
Party	Candidate	Votes	%	±%
Conservative	Stuart Anderson	302	38.5	+38.5
Independent	Clare Fenton	162	20.6	+20.6
It's Our County	Matt Bushkes	156	19.9	−30.1
Liberal Democrats	Lucy Hurds	90	11.5	−21.9
Labour	David Lewer	75	9.6	+9.6
Majority		140	17.8	
Turnout		785		
Conservative gain from It's Our County		Swing		

Bishops Frome and Cradley By-Election 23 November 2017
Party	Candidate	Votes	%	±%
Green	Ellie Chowns	471	45.3	+13.9
Conservative	Robert Carter	299	28.8	−39.8
Liberal Democrats	Jeanie Falconer	251	24.1	+24.1
Labour	Roger Page	19	1.8	+1.8
Majority		172	16.5	
Turnout		1,040		
Green gain from Conservative		Swing		

=== 2019–2023 ===
Whitecross By-Election 11 July 2019
Party	Candidate	Votes	%	±%
It's Our County	Dave Boulter	304	60.7	+13.0
Liberal Democrats	Tricia Hales	141	28.1	+10.5
Conservative	Rob Williams	56	11.2	−3.4
Majority		163	32.5	
Turnout		501		
It's Our County hold		Swing		

Newton Farm By-Election 6 May 2021
Party	Candidate	Votes	%	±%
Conservative	Ann-Marie Probert	282	42.2	+34.4
Liberal Democrats	Jacqueline Carwardine	190	28.4	+1.9
Labour	Steve Horsfield	64	9.6	−8.6
Independent	Alan Jones	62	9.3	+9.3
Independent	Glenda Powell	45	6.7	+6.7
Independent	Des Woods	16	2.4	+2.4
TUSC	Amelia Washbourne	9	1.3	+1.3
Majority		92	13.8	
Turnout		668		
Conservative gain from Independent		Swing		

Bromyard West By-Election 10 March 2022
Party	Candidate	Votes	%	±%
Independent	Clare Davies	315	55.6	+55.6
Independent	Nick Ferguson	152	26.8	+26.8
Conservative	Mark Franklin	100	17.6	−22.3
Majority		163	28.7	
Turnout		567		
Independent gain from It's Our County		Swing		

=== 2023–2027 ===
Golden Valley South By-Election 26 October 2023
Party	Candidate	Votes	%	±%
Independent	Matthew Engel	548	61.2	+61.2
Conservative	Dave Greenow	249	27.8	−7.4
Labour	Sandy Grenar	34	3.8	+3.8
Independent	Mike Jones	34	3.8	+3.8
Liberal Democrats	Cat Hornsey	30	3.4	−9.1
Majority		299	33.4	
Turnout		895		
Independent hold		Swing		

This by-election was originally scheduled for 7 September 2023; however, it was postponed due to the death of independent candidate Toby Murcott.

Credenhill By-Election 26 September 2024
Party	Candidate	Votes	%	±%
Independent	Charlie Taylor	201	33.8	+20.7
Independent	Mike Jones	150	25.3	+25.3
Conservative	Gareth Johnston	108	18.2	−15.4
Reform	Brian Evans	89	15.0	+15.0
Liberal Democrats	Debbie Hobbs	27	4.5	−10.5
Labour	Mike Crofts	19	3.2	+3.2
Majority		51	8.6	
Turnout		594		
Independent hold		Swing		

Bishops Frome & Cradley By-Election 7 November 2024
Party	Candidate	Votes	%	±%
Green	Rebecca Tully	531	60.1	−8.9
Conservative	Mark Franklin	215	24.3	−2.9
Reform	David James	99	11.2	+11.2
Liberal Democrats	Nicki West	27	3.1	−0.8
Labour	Sandy Grenar	12	1.4	+1.4
Majority		316	35.8	
Turnout		884		
Green hold		Swing		
