= 2011 Herefordshire Council election =

Local election in Herefordshire, UK

Results of the 2011 Herefordshire Council election

Elections to Herefordshire Council were held on 5 May 2011, alongside other local elections across the United Kingdom. All 58 seats on the council were up for election. Following the election the council remained under Conservative control.

== Conduct ==
For the first time, Herefordshire Council used the social media platform Twitter to tweet the election results.

== Results ==
Results
Party	Seats Before	Change	Seats After
Conservative Party	32	▼2	30
Liberal Democrats	9	▼6	3
Labour Party	2	▼1	1
Green Party	1	Steady	1
Others	14	▲9	23

== See also ==
- Herefordshire Council elections
