= Newton Farm =

Newton Farm may refer to:

- A. Newton Farm, a historic home and farm in New York State, USA
- Edrom Newton Farm, an historic farm house in Edrom, Berwickshire, Scotland
- A housing development at Newton, South Lanarkshire, Scotland
- A ward in Herefordshire, West Midlands, England; see 2019 Herefordshire Council election

== See also ==
- Newton (disambiguation)
