= 2007 Herefordshire Council election =

2007 UK local government election

Results of the 2007 Herefordshire Council election

Elections to Herefordshire Council were held on 3 May 2007, along with the other local elections in England and Scotland. The entire council was up for election, with each successful candidate serving a four-year term of office, expiring in 2011. The Conservative Party gained a majority on the council, after seven years of the council being under no overall control.

== Council Composition ==
Prior to the election the composition of the council was:

↓
21	17	13	4	1
Conservative	Liberal Democrats	Independent	Labour	NL

NL - No description

== Ward results ==
Asterisks denote incumbent Councillors seeking re-election. All results are listed below:

=== Aylestone ===
Aylestone (2 Seats)
Party	Candidate	Votes	%	±%
Conservative	Nicholas Louis Vaughan	736	23.47	+10.04
Conservative	Denis Brian Wilcox*	658	20.98	+1.88
Liberal Democrats	Alan Lloyd Williams*	514	16.39	−2.71
Independent	Benjamin Timothy Francis Mason	481	15.34	N/A
Liberal Democrats	Owen Christopher Howell	341	10.87	−6.93
Green	Terry Hugh Oliver	209	6.67	+1.25
Green	Rebecca Roseff	197	6.28	2.28
Majority		144	4.59	
Turnout		3,136	36.29	−17.76
Conservative hold		Swing		
Conservative gain from Liberal Democrats		Swing		

=== Backbury ===
Backbury (1 Seat)
Party	Candidate	Votes	%	±%
Conservative	Josephine Elizabeth Pemberton*	638	57.37	+8.48
Liberal Democrats	Michael Clifford	275	24.73	−12.72
Green	Anthony Edward Winch	199	17.90	N/A
Majority		363	32.64	
Turnout		1,112	46.43	−14.09
Conservative hold		Swing		

=== Belmont ===
Belmont (3 Seats)
Party	Candidate	Votes	%	±%
Independent	Philip James Edwards*	845	18.13	−0.13
Independent	Glenda Ann Powell*	512	10.99	−1.98
Liberal Democrats	Heather Davies	464	9.96	−4.95
Liberal Democrats	David Samuel George Hughes	384	8.24	−3.36
Liberal Democrats	Peter John Cecchetto	341	7.32	−3.24
BNP	Elizabeth Ann Morris	311	7.10	N/A
Conservative	Allan Bright Lloyd	278	5.97	−0.15
Independent	Craig Rumball	270	5.79	N/A
Conservative	Richard John Croot	241	5.17	+2.06
Green	Celia Roberta Blackwell	234	5.02	N/A
Labour	James Harding	212	4.55	−0.17
Green	Aubrey Paget Baillie	209	4.48	N/A
Labour	Neil David Barrington	198	4.25	−0.21
Labour	Barbara Ann Evans	141	3.03	−0.36
Majority		80	1.72	
Turnout		4,660	27.91	−19.83
Independent hold		Swing		
Independent hold		Swing		
Liberal Democrats hold		Swing		

=== Bircher ===
Bircher (1 Seat)
Party	Candidate	Votes	%	±%
Independent	William Luis Sebastian Bowen	904	70.85	+5.05
Conservative	Michael Colin Dowding	372	29.15	−5.08
Majority		532	41.70	
Turnout		1,276	57.07	−15.44
Independent hold		Swing		

=== Bringsty ===
Bringsty (1 Seat)
Party	Candidate	Votes	%	±%
Conservative	Thomas William Hunt	465	45.54	+2.18
Independent	Christopher John Grover	419	41.04	N/A
Green	Kevin Abraham	137	13.42	N/A
Majority		46	4.50	
Turnout		1,021	44.93	−19.75
Conservative hold		Swing		

=== Bromyard ===
Bromyard (2 Seats)
Party	Candidate	Votes	%	±%
Independent	Alan Seldon	649	23.27	N/A
Independent	Bernard Hunt*	604	21.66	−0.08
Conservative	Caroline Audrey Donnelly	550	19.72	+0.08
Conservative	Justin Guy McBarnet	466	16.71	+4.08
Green	Barbara Konig	368	13.19	N/A
	William Albert Gibbard	152	5.45	N/A
Majority		54	1.94	
Turnout		2,789	36.45	
Independent hold		Swing		
Independent gain from Liberal Democrats		Swing		

=== Burghill, Holmer & Lyde ===
Burghill, Holmer & Lyde (1 Seat)
Party	Candidate	Votes	%	±%
Independent	Sally Jane Robertson*	969	90.90	+32.36
Green	Julia Parker-Harris	97	9.10	N/A
Majority		872	81.80	
Turnout		1,066	41.60	+5.58
Independent hold		Swing		

=== Castle ===
Castle (1 Seat)
Party	Candidate	Votes	%	±%
Conservative	John William Hope*	924	66.00	+6.58
Independent	Roger Dudley Prout	293	20.93	N/A
Green	Leslie Earl Hardy	183	13.07	N/A
Majority		631	45.07	
Turnout		1,400	57.42	−12.38
Conservative hold		Swing		

=== Central ===
Central (1 Seat)
Party	Candidate	Votes	%	±%
Independent	Mark Arthur Fortescue Hubbard	413	63.83	N/A
Liberal Democrats	David John Fleet*	234	36.17	−1.20
Majority		179	27.66	
Turnout		647	33.07	−20.67
Independent gain from Liberal Democrats		Swing		

=== Credenhill ===
Credenhill (1 Seat)
Party	Candidate	Votes	%	±%
Independent	Robert Ivor Matthews	424	42.53	−12.87
Liberal Democrats	Mary Ida Short	254	25.48	−5.58
Conservative	Elizabeth Barbara Newman	245	24.57	+11.03
Green	Brian Ralph Lunt	74	7.42	N/A
Majority		170	17.05	
Turnout		997	40.46	−21.32
Independent hold		Swing		

=== Frome ===
Frome (1 Seat)
Party	Candidate	Votes	%	±%
Conservative	Patricia Mary Morgan	842	56.36	+9.69
Green	Guy Harry Morgan Woodford	604	40.43	−4.77
Independent	Robert Peter Wilson Nock	48	3.21	N/A
Majority		238	15.93	
Turnout		1,494	58.16	−12.30
Conservative hold		Swing		

=== Golden Cross with Weobley ===
Golden Cross with Weobley (1 Seat)
Party	Candidate	Votes	%	±%
Conservative	John Hutcheson Ruell Goodwin*	621	48.82	−1.87
Independent	Martin Christopher Woodhouse Peacock	297	23.35	N/A
Liberal Democrats	Lucy Ann Hurds	241	18.95	−20.65
Green	Jan Hardy	113	8.88	N/A
Majority		324	25.47	
Turnout		1,272	54.07	−14.71
Conservative hold		Swing		

=== Golden Valley North ===
Golden Valley North (1 Seat)
Party	Candidate	Votes	%	±%
Conservative	Philip David Price	568	47.18	+10.85
Independent	Brendan Charles Treanor	370	30.73	−1.52
Green	Edwina Jane Hamilton	135	11.21	N/A
Liberal Democrats	Ernest Douglas Lawson	131	10.88	−20.54
Majority		198	16.45	
Turnout		1,204	50.44	−15.54
Conservative hold		Swing		

=== Golden Valley South ===
Golden Valley South (1 Seat)
Party	Candidate	Votes	%	±%
Independent	John Berisford Williams*	422	33.76	−8.02
Liberal Democrats	Ann-Maria Impey	408	32.64	−0.89
Conservative	Richard Nicholas Gildart Jackson	333	26.64	+1.95
Green	Anita Louisa Sancha	87	6.96	N/A
Majority		14	1.12	
Turnout		1,250	52.85	−14.95
Independent hold		Swing		

=== Hagley ===
Hagley (1 Seat)
Party	Candidate	Votes	%	±%
Conservative	David William Greenow	426	37.08	+2.49
Independent	Robert Michael Wilson*	399	34.72	−7.03
Liberal Democrats	Martin Russell Wyness	324	28.20	+4.54
Majority		27	2.36	
Turnout		1,149	41.82	−16.49
Conservative gain from Independent		Swing		

=== Hampton Court ===
Hampton Court (1 Seat)
Party	Candidate	Votes	%	±%
Conservative	Keith Gordon Grumbley	803	74.77	+28.29
Green	Christine Ann Oxley	96	8.94	N/A
Liberal Democrats	Roland Charles Summers	94	8.75	−25.40
Independent	Karen Marie Harmer	81	7.54	N/A
Majority		707	65.83	
Turnout		1,074	49.25	−18.73
Conservative hold		Swing		

=== Hollington ===
Hollington (1 Seat)
Party	Candidate	Votes	%	±%
Green	Gerald Dawe	223	27.10	N/A
Independent	Gillian Emily Thomas	204	24.79	N/A
Liberal Democrats	William John Thomas*	203	24.66	−10.62
Conservative	Barry Alan Durkin	193	23.45	+9.58
Majority		19	2.31	
Turnout		823	51.49	−16.28
Green gain from Liberal Democrats		Swing		

Cllr Dawe previously stood as an Independent candidate in 2003.

=== Hope End ===
Hope End (2 Seats)
Party	Candidate	Votes	%	±%
Conservative	Roy Vincent Stockton*	1,030	31.44	+0.73
Conservative	Rees Mills	944	28.81	−0.22
Green	Michael Leigh Abbott	487	14.87	+1.41
Liberal Democrats	Terence Leonard Kimberley White	480	14.65	−0.87
Liberal Democrats	Anthony Joseph Vincent Geraghty	335	10.23	N/A
Majority		457	13.94	
Turnout		3,276	43.28	−21.19
Conservative hold		Swing		
Conservative hold		Swing		

=== Kerne Bridge ===
Kerne Bridge (1 Seat)
Party	Candidate	Votes	%	±%
Conservative	John Gilchrist Jarvis	507	41.46	+6.25
Independent	Simon Wood Cole	485	39.66	N/A
Liberal Democrats	Mars Jason Thomas	127	10.38	N/A
Green	Adrian James Worgan	104	8.50	N/A
Majority		22	1.80	
Turnout		1,223	48.66	−6.94
Conservative gain from Independent		Swing		

=== Kington Town ===
Kington Town (1 Seat)
Party	Candidate	Votes	%	±%
Liberal Democrats	Terence Morgan James	578	48.09	+9.99
Independent	Allan William Lloyd	373	31.03	−5.34
Conservative	Robert Noel David Pritchard	251	20.88	−4.65
Majority		205	17.06	
Turnout		1,202	50.38	−16.81
Liberal Democrats hold		Swing		

=== Ledbury ===
Ledbury (3 Seats)
Party	Candidate	Votes	%	±%
Conservative	Jacqueline Kay Swinburne	1,393	18.52	−0.33
Conservative	Peter John Watts	1,331	17.69	5.00
Conservative	Mary Edna Cooper	1,255	16.68	+7.49
Liberal Democrats	Barry Frank Ashton*	976	12.98	−3.02
Independent	Phillip Leslie Bettington	820	10.90	N/A
Liberal Democrats	Turi Benjamin Munthe	799	10.62	N/A
Green	Stephen Edwin Betts	693	9.22	N/A
	Anthony Roland Bradford	255	3.39	N/A
Majority		279	3.70	
Turnout		7,522	39.61	−17.93
Conservative gain from Independent		Swing		
Conservative hold		Swing		
Conservative gain from Liberal Democrats		Swing		

=== Leominster North ===
Leominster North (2 Seats)
Party	Candidate	Votes	%	±%
Conservative	Peter Jones*	666	28.93	+2.30
Conservative	June Patricia French*	607	26.37	−0.28
Green	Felicity Mary Norman	438	19.03	N/A
Liberal Democrats	David Anthony Hurds	216	9.38	N/A
Labour	Edward Henry Clark	197	8.56	−5.54
Independent	David Athelstan Romilly Martin	178	7.73	−2.30
Majority		169	7.34	
Turnout		2,302	30.39	−18.90
Conservative hold		Swing		
Conservative hold		Swing		

=== Leominster South ===
Leominster South (2 Seats)
Party	Candidate	Votes	%	±%
Conservative	Roger Charles Hunt	827	32.97	+16.99
Conservative	Dick Burke*	634	25.28	−0.41
Green	Joan Thwaites	393	15.67	+8.76
Independent	Aubrey Basil Greene	387	15.43	N/A
Liberal Democrats	Linda Craig Forbes	267	10.65	+3.43
Majority		241	9.61	
Turnout		2,508	32.82	−20.91
Conservative hold		Swing		
Conservative gain from Labour		Swing		

=== Llangarron ===
Llangarron (1 Seat)
Party	Candidate	Votes	%	±%
Conservative	Jennifer Ann Hyde*	699	61.32	+9.99
Independent	Bryan John Stockley	248	21.75	N/A
Liberal Democrats	Hazel Rebecca Roberts	193	16.93	−1.42
Majority		451	39.57	
Turnout		1,140	44.30	−16.53
Conservative hold		Swing		

=== Mortimer ===
The single seat in this ward was uncontested. The incumbent Conservative Party candidate Lillian Olwyn Barnett remained as the councillor for this ward.

=== Old Gore ===
Old Gore (1 Seat)
Party	Candidate	Votes	%	±%
Conservative	Theresa Margaret Ruth McLean	545	45.95	6.10
Independent	John William Edwards*	448	37.78	−22.37
Liberal Democrats	Anna Rachel Roberts	193	16.27	N/A
Majority		97	8.17	
Turnout		1,186	49.81	−14.37
Conservative gain from Independent		Swing		
