= 2019 Herefordshire Council election =

2019 UK local government election

- 2 May 2019

All 53 to Herefordshire Council 27 seats needed for a majority

	First party	Second party	Third party
Party	Independent	Conservative	It's Our County
Last election	8 seats, 18.7%	29 seats, 41.4%	12 seats, 26.5%
Seats won	18	13	8
Seat change	▲10	▼16	▼4
Popular vote	14,784	17,334	4,425
Percentage	29.0%	34.0%	8.7%
Swing	▲10.3%	▼7.4%	▼17.8%
	Fourth party	Fifth party
Party	Green	Liberal Democrats
Last election	2 seats, 4.4%	2 seats, 7.1%
Seats won	7	7
Seat change	▲5	▲5
Popular vote	6,652	5,041
Percentage	13.0%	9.9%
Swing	▲8.6%	▲2.8%
- Map of the results of the election. Colours denote the winning party, as shown in the main table of results.
Council control before election
Conservative
Council control after election
No overall control
(Ind/IOC/Green coalition)

The 2019 Herefordshire Council election took place on 2 May 2019 to elect 52 of 53 members of Herefordshire Council in England. The election in Ross North ward was deferred until 6 June 2019 following the death of the UKIP candidate.

== Summary ==
=== Election result ===
The election resulted in the Conservative Party losing its majority on the council for the first time since 2007, winning 13 seats. Independents made gains and became the largest group on the council after winning 18 seats, 9 seats short of a majority. The Liberal Democrats and Greens also made gains at the expense of the Conservatives, winning 7 seats each. Two non-party groupings, the 'Herefordshire Independents' (comprising 15 of the 18 Independents elected) and the localist It's Our County, formed a coalition with the Greens to govern the council.

2019 Herefordshire Council election
Party	Candidates	Seats	Gains	Losses	Net gain/loss	Seats %	Votes %	Votes	+/−
Independent	32	18	13	3	▲10	34.0	29.0	14,784	+10.3
Conservative	53	13	1	17	▼16	24.5	34.2	17,334	–7.2
It's Our County	11	8	2	6	▼4	15.1	8.7	4,425	–17.8
Green	12	7	5	0	▲5	13.2	13.1	6,652	+8.7
Liberal Democrats	18	7	5	0	▲5	13.2	9.9	5,041	+2.8
Labour	10	0	0	0	Steady	0.0	3.5	1,773	+3.2
UKIP	7	0	0	0	Steady	0.0	1.9	961	+0.4
Democrats and Veterans	1	0	0	0	Steady	0.0	0.2	92	New

== Ward results ==
=== Arrow ===
Arrow
Party	Candidate	Votes	%	±%
Conservative	Roger Phillips	931	79.8	▲7.6
Labour	Liz Lever	236	20.2	N/A
Turnout		1,167	40.2	
Conservative hold		Swing		

=== Aylestone Hill ===
Aylestone Hill
Party	Candidate	Votes	%	±%
Independent	Ange Tyler	746	74.2	▲30.3
Conservative	Frank Cornthwaite	260	25.8	▼1.1
Turnout		1,006	40.6	
Independent gain from It's Our County		Swing		

=== Backbury ===
Backbury
Party	Candidate	Votes	%	±%
Independent	John Hardwick	788	70.5	▲26.2
Conservative	Barclay Rogers	329	29.5	▼5.3
Turnout		1,117	41.3	
Independent hold		Swing		

=== Belmont Rural ===
Belmont Rural
Party	Candidate	Votes	%	±%
It's Our County	Tracy Bowes	624	79.6	▲45.0
Conservative	Jamie Price	160	20.4	▼12.6
Turnout		784	28.3	
It's Our County hold		Swing		

=== Birch ===
Birch
Party	Candidate	Votes	%	±%
Green	Toni Fagan	779	64.5	N/A
Conservative	David Atkinson	429	35.5	▼10.9
Turnout		1,208	49.3	
Green gain from Conservative		Swing		

=== Bircher ===
Bircher
Party	Candidate	Votes	%	±%
Independent	Sebastian Bowen	1,330	94.3	▲33.3
Conservative	Rachael Fitzgerald Finch	80	5.7	▼22.6
Turnout		1,410	45.6	
Independent hold		Swing		

=== Bishops Frome & Cradley ===
Bishops Frome & Cradley
Party	Candidate	Votes	%	±%
Green	Ellie Chowns	974	78.6	▲47.2
Conservative	Peter Hamblin	265	21.4	▼47.2
Turnout		1,239	48.0	
Green gain from Conservative		Swing		

=== Bobblestock ===
Bobblestock
Party	Candidate	Votes	%	±%
Independent	Tim Price	326	49.2	N/A
Conservative	Clive Butler	179	27.0	▼5.6
UKIP	Gwyn Price	157	23.7	▲2.3
Turnout		662	25.9	
Independent gain from Conservative		Swing		

=== Bromyard Bringsty ===
Bromyard Bringsty
Party	Candidate	Votes	%	±%
Conservative	Nigel Shaw	540	53.0	▲15.1
Independent	Roger Page	479	47.0	N/A
Turnout		1,019	37.4	
Conservative hold		Swing		

=== Bromyard West ===
Bromyard West
Party	Candidate	Votes	%	±%
It's Our County	Alan Seldon	395	60.1	▲5.4
Conservative	Andrew Jones	262	39.9	▼5.4
Turnout		657	27.1	
It's Our County hold		Swing		

=== Castle ===
Castle
Party	Candidate	Votes	%	±%
Independent	Graham Jones	752	62.6	N/A
Conservative	Alan Watkins	449	37.4	▼6.7
Turnout		1,201	47.7	
Independent gain from Conservative		Swing		

=== Central ===
Central
Party	Candidate	Votes	%	±%
Green	Jeremy Milln	471	53.9	N/A
Liberal Democrats	Rob Owens	192	22.0	▼0.1
Conservative	Allan Drew	121	13.8	▼13.4
Independent	Jonathan Jones	90	10.3	N/A
Turnout		874	36.1	
Green gain from It's Our County		Swing		

=== College ===
College
Party	Candidate	Votes	%	±%
It's Our County	Kath Hey	374	46.2	▲19.0
Conservative	Brian Wilcox	297	36.7	▲1.6
UKIP	Stephen Cooke	139	17.2	N/A
Turnout		810	30.4	
It's Our County gain from Conservative		Swing		

=== Credenhill ===
Credenhill
Party	Candidate	Votes	%	±%
Independent	Bob Matthews	717	80.9	▲32.6
Conservative	Phil Marsh	169	19.1	▼7.3
Turnout		886	36.6	
Independent hold		Swing		

=== Dinedor Hill ===
Dinedor Hill
Party	Candidate	Votes	%	±%
It's Our County	David Summers	498	51.8	▲0.6
Conservative	Esther Rudge	463	48.2	▼0.6
Turnout		961	35.0	
It's Our County hold		Swing		

=== Eign Hill ===
Eign Hill
Party	Candidate	Votes	%	±%
It's Our County	Elizabeth Foxton	476	45.6	▲7.0
Conservative	Kieran Phillips	125	12.0	▼9.0
Liberal Democrats	David Hurds	114	10.9	▲2.0
Independent	Catherine North	329	31.5	N/A
Turnout		1,044	38.8	
It's Our County hold		Swing		

=== Golden Valley North ===
Golden Valley North
Party	Candidate	Votes	%	±%
Independent	Jennie Hewitt	697	52.7	N/A
Conservative	Philip Price	485	36.7	▼8.5
Labour	Anna-Maria Coda	141	10.7	N/A
Turnout		1,323	55.1	
Independent gain from Conservative		Swing		

=== Golden Valley South ===
Golden Valley South
Party	Candidate	Votes	%	±%
Independent	Peter Jinman	805	73.4	N/A
Conservative	Nicholas Savage	149	13.6	▼52.2
Labour	Isabelle Watkins	142	13.0	N/A
Turnout		1,096	41.8	
Independent gain from Conservative		Swing		

=== Greyfriars ===
Greyfriars
Party	Candidate	Votes	%	±%
Green	Diana Toynbee	531	52.9	N/A
Independent	Sharon Michael	270	26.9	N/A
Conservative	Anil Kuttikrishnan Nair	116	11.6	▼14.7
Liberal Democrats	Stephen Williams	86	8.6	▼4.9
Turnout		1,003	36.0	
Green gain from It's Our County		Swing		

=== Hagley ===
Hagley
Party	Candidate	Votes	%	±%
Independent	Paul Andrews	541	54.6	N/A
Conservative	Dave Greenow	449	45.4	▲8.3
Turnout		990	33.8	
Independent gain from Conservative		Swing		

=== Hampton ===
Hampton
Party	Candidate	Votes	%	±%
It's Our County	John Harrington	611	56.6	▲19.2
Conservative	Bruce Baker	468	43.4	▼13.1
Turnout		1,079	38.4	
It's Our County gain from Conservative		Swing		

=== Hinton & Hunderton ===
Hinton & Hunderton
Party	Candidate	Votes	%	±%
Liberal Democrats	Kevin Tillett	251	34.3	▲19.2
Independent	Chris Chappell	192	26.2	▼12.9
UKIP	Nigel Ely	172	23.5	N/A
Conservative	Peter Harries	63	8.6	N/A
Independent	Ashley Winter	54	7.4	N/A
Turnout		732	25.6	
Liberal Democrats gain from Independent		Swing		

=== Holmer ===
Holmer
Party	Candidate	Votes	%	±%
Conservative	Mark Millmore	347	36.5	▲3.5
Independent	John Phipps	312	32.8	N/A
Independent	Stephen Tannatt Nash	291	30.6	N/A
Turnout		950	32.3	
Conservative gain from Independent		Swing		

=== Hope End ===
Hope End
Party	Candidate	Votes	%	±%
Conservative	Tony Johnson	690	58.1	▼1.0
Labour	Phil Probert	498	41.9	N/A
Turnout		1,188	41.8	
Conservative hold		Swing		

=== Kerne Bridge ===
Kerne Bridge
Party	Candidate	Votes	%	±%
Independent	Yolande Watson	588	53.5	N/A
Conservative	Paul Newman	511	46.5	▼3.3
Turnout		1,099	44.3	
Independent gain from Conservative		Swing		

=== Kings Acre ===
Kings Acre
Party	Candidate	Votes	%	±%
Independent	Graham Andrews	534	70.5	N/A
Conservative	Rob Williams	223	29.5	N/A
Turnout		757	28.6	
Independent gain from It's Our County		Swing		

=== Kington ===
Kington
Party	Candidate	Votes	%	±%
Liberal Democrats	Terry James	736	81.2	▲81.2
Conservative	Roger Pendleton	170	18.8	N/A
Turnout		906	36.0	
Liberal Democrats hold		Swing		

=== Ledbury North ===
Ledbury North
Party	Candidate	Votes	%	±%
It's Our County	Liz Harvey	451	54.5	▼5.6
Conservative	Karl Bufton	376	45.5	▲5.6
Turnout		827	32.7	
It's Our County hold		Swing		

=== Ledbury South ===
Ledbury South
Party	Candidate	Votes	%	±%
Conservative	Helen I'Anson	285	38.6	▼9.9
Liberal Democrats	Matthew Eakin	245	33.2	▲17.5
Labour	Maria Mackness	150	20.3	N/A
Independent	Emma Holton	59	8.0	N/A
Turnout		739	29.5	
Conservative hold		Swing		

=== Ledbury West ===
Ledbury West
Party	Candidate	Votes	%	±%
Liberal Democrats	Phillip Howells	312	47.5	N/A
Independent	Phill Bettington	194	29.5	N/A
Conservative	Debbie Baker	151	23.0	▼23.4
Turnout		657	24.3	
Liberal Democrats gain from It's Our County		Swing		

=== Leominster East ===
Leominster East
Party	Candidate	Votes	%	±%
Green	Jenny Bartlett	654	72.3	▲25.5
Conservative	Wayne Rosser	250	27.7	▼9.0
Turnout		904	30.8	
Green hold		Swing		

=== Leominster North & Rural ===
Leominster North & Rural
Party	Candidate	Votes	%	±%
Conservative	John Stone	601	63.7	▼3.6
Green	Tessa Smith-Winnard	342	36.3	▲3.6
Turnout		943	31.1	
Conservative hold		Swing		

=== Leominster South ===
Leominster South
Party	Candidate	Votes	%	±%
Green	Trish Marsh	527	72.7	▲42.0
Conservative	Angela Pendleton	198	27.3	▲0.8
Turnout		725	28.2	
Green gain from Independent		Swing		

=== Leominster West ===
Leominster West
Party	Candidate	Votes	%	±%
Green	Felicity Norman	515	72.6	▲21.8
Conservative	Thomas Mangnall	104	14.7	▼21.5
Liberal Democrats	Clive Thomas	90	12.7	▼0.3
Turnout		709	32.3	
Green hold		Swing		

=== Llangarron ===
Llangarron
Party	Candidate	Votes	%	±%
Conservative	Elissa Swinglehurst	653	54.2	▼2.1
Green	Maggie Setterfield	552	45.8	N/A
Turnout		1,205	44.4	
Conservative hold		Swing		

=== Mortimer ===
Mortimer
Party	Candidate	Votes	%	±%
Conservative	Carole Gandy	603	53.6	▲12.6
It's Our County	Michael Guest	276	24.6	▼16.2
Liberal Democrats	Jonathan Catling	245	21.8	N/A
Turnout		1,124	42.4	
Conservative hold		Swing		

=== Newton Farm ===
Newton Farm
Party	Candidate	Votes	%	±%
Independent	Bernard Hunt	171	30.9	N/A
Liberal Democrats	Jacqui Carwardine	147	26.5	▲14.7
Labour	Margy Whalley	101	18.2	N/A
Democrats and Veterans	Glen Powell	92	16.6	N/A
Conservative	Jeremy Chapman	43	7.8	▼8.6
Turnout		554	18.6	
Independent hold		Swing		

=== Old Gore ===
Old Gore
Party	Candidate	Votes	%	±%
Conservative	Barry Durkin	629	58.3	▲4.1
Green	Robert Palgrave	449	41.7	N/A
Turnout		1,078	43.0	
Conservative hold		Swing		

=== Penyard ===
Penyard
Party	Candidate	Votes	%	±%
Independent	William Wilding	573	47.7	N/A
Conservative	Harry Bramer	524	43.6	▼20.4
UKIP	David Howle	104	8.7	N/A
Turnout		1,201	43.6	
Independent gain from Conservative		Swing		

=== Queenswood ===
Queenswood
Party	Candidate	Votes	%	±%
Independent	Pauline Crockett	834	80.8	▲39.4
Conservative	Matthew Kirby	198	19.2	▼14.2
Turnout		1,032	38.7	
Independent hold		Swing		

=== Red Hill ===
Red Hill
Party	Candidate	Votes	%	±%
Conservative	Paul Rone	308	39.8	▼4.7
Liberal Democrats	Daniel Powell	284	36.7	▲25.3
Independent	Amanda Martin	181	23.4	N/A
Turnout		773	26.6	
Conservative hold		Swing		

=== Ross East ===
Ross East
Party	Candidate	Votes	%	±%
Liberal Democrats	Paul Symonds	536	46.0	▲29.5
Conservative	Phillip Cutter	316	27.1	▼9.2
It's Our County	Andrew Hotston	129	11.1	N/A
UKIP	Clive Hamilton	93	8.0	▼6.9
Labour	Terry Prince	92	7.9	N/A
Turnout		1,166	39.6	
Liberal Democrats gain from Conservative		Swing		

=== Ross North ===
The election in Ross North ward was deferred until 6 June 2019 following the death of the UKIP candidate, Gareth Williams. The Liberal Democrats won the postponed election.

Ross North
Party	Candidate	Votes	%	±%
Liberal Democrats	Christopher Bartrum	547	75.1	
Conservative	Nigel Gibbs	136	18.7	
Labour	Melvin Hodges	45	6.2	
Turnout		728	26	
Liberal Democrats gain from Conservative		Swing		

=== Ross West ===
Ross West
Party	Candidate	Votes	%	±%
Liberal Democrats	Louis Stark	469	47.2	▲10.7
Conservative	Simeon Cole	309	31.1	▼18.5
Independent	Robert Taylor	216	21.7	N/A
Turnout		994	37.1	
Liberal Democrats gain from Conservative		Swing		

=== Saxon Gate ===
Saxon Gate
Party	Candidate	Votes	%	±%
Independent	Gemma Dean	352	53.0	N/A
Liberal Democrats	Aubrey Oliver	187	28.2	▲5.2
Conservative	Mark McEvilly	125	18.8	▼17.2
Turnout		664	23.9	
Independent gain from Conservative		Swing		

=== Stoney Street ===
Stoney Street
Party	Candidate	Votes	%	±%
Independent	David Hitchiner	602	55.5	N/A
Conservative	Stephen Williams	284	26.2	▼5.4
Liberal Democrats	David Howerski	199	18.3	N/A
Turnout		1,085	41.1	
Independent gain from Conservative		Swing		

=== Sutton Walls ===
Sutton Walls
Party	Candidate	Votes	%	±%
Conservative	Kema Gaster	505	50.7	▲6.6
Independent	Steve Williams	492	49.3	N/A
Turnout		997	39.9	
Conservative hold		Swing		

=== Three Crosses ===
Three Crosses
Party	Candidate	Votes	%	±%
Conservative	Jonathan Lester	699	61.6	▼1.0
Green	Rebecca Tully	436	38.4	N/A
Turnout		1,135	40.7	
Conservative hold		Swing		

=== Tupsley ===
Tupsley
Party	Candidate	Votes	%	±%
Independent	Jim Kenyon	776	79.9	N/A
Conservative	Thomas Small	195	20.1	▲2.1
Turnout		971	39.8	
Independent gain from It's Our County		Swing		

=== Weobley ===
Weobley
Party	Candidate	Votes	%	±%
Independent	Michael Jones	493	43.7	▼5.7
Conservative	Mark Cooper	371	32.9	▼17.7
Labour	Heather Morison	265	23.5	N/A
Turnout		1,129	39.0	
Independent gain from Conservative		Swing		

=== Whitecross ===
Whitecross
Party	Candidate	Votes	%	±%
It's Our County	Sue Boulter	400	47.7	▲18.7
UKIP	Richard Smith	169	20.1	▼0.7
Liberal Democrats	Tricia Hales	148	17.6	▼1.4
Conservative	Keith Farmer	122	14.5	▼8.9
Turnout		839	32.2	
It's Our County hold		Swing		

=== Widemarsh ===
Widemarsh
Party	Candidate	Votes	%	±%
Liberal Democrats	Polly Andrews	253	39.5	▲0.7
It's Our County	Paul Stevens	191	29.8	▼6.8
UKIP	Mick Gunner	127	19.8	N/A
Conservative	Michael Agyeman	70	10.9	▼13.7
Turnout		641	28.8	
Liberal Democrats hold		Swing		

=== Wormside ===
Wormside
Party	Candidate	Votes	%	±%
Conservative	Christy Bolderson	549	51.1	▲10.9
Green	Carole Protherough	422	39.3	N/A
Labour	Stephen Hancorn	103	9.6	N/A
Turnout		1,074	39.7	
Conservative hold		Swing		

== Changes 2019–2023 ==
Following negotiations, a three-way coalition between 'Herefordshire Independents', 'It's Our County' and the Green Party was formed. Herefordshire Independents took four cabinet positions, and the Leader of the Council, the Greens took two cabinet positions and Deputy Leader of the Council and It's Our County took the remaining two cabinet positions.

Date	Herefordshire Independents	Conservative	It's Our County	Greens	Lib Dems	Independent	Vacant	Coalition Majority
3 May 2019	15	13	8	7	6	3	1	+7

- 5 June 2019: Following disagreements about a new by-pass road in the Herefordshire Independents group, five councillors left to form a new group, 'True Independents'.
- 14 September 2019: Former Hereford city mayor Jim Kenyon had temporarily joined the Herefordshire Independents to bolster their numbers, and since left again to sit as the last remaining standalone independent, as the other two previously unaligned independents had joined the ruling coalition of Herefordshire Independents, taking Herefordshire Independents to 12 seats.
- In May 2021, the Herefordshire Independents and It's Our County groups merged to form a single group, 'Independents for Herefordshire', chaired by John Harrington.
- Paul Symonds, elected as a Liberal Democrat for Ross East in 2019, left the party to sit as an independent.
- 17 February 2023: Kath Hey, elected for It's Our County in 2019 and by then sitting within the Independents for Herefordshire group, joined the Labour Party.

=== By-elections ===
==== Ross North ====
Ross North by-election: 6 June 2019
Party	Candidate	Votes	%	±%
Liberal Democrats	Christopher Bartrum	547	75.1	N/A
Conservative	Nigel Gibbs	136	18.7	N/A
Labour	Melvin Hodges	45	6.2	N/A
Majority		411	56.5	N/A
Turnout		728	26.0	N/A
Liberal Democrats gain from Conservative		Swing	N/A	

The poll was postponed following the death of UKIP candidate Gareth Williams; the Liberal Democrats won the rescheduled election.

==== Whitecross ====
Whitecross by-election: 11 July 2019
Party	Candidate	Votes	%	±%
It's Our County	Dave Boulter	304	60.7	N/A
Liberal Democrats	Tricia Hales	141	28.1	N/A
Conservative	Rob Williams	56	11.2	N/A
Majority		163	32.5	N/A
Turnout		501	19.0	N/A
It's Our County hold				

The by-election was triggered by Sue Boulter's resignation shortly after her election as an It's Our County councillor; her husband Dave Boulter retained the seat for the party.

==== Newton Farm ====
Newton Farm by-election: 6 May 2021
Party	Candidate	Votes	%	±%
Conservative	Ann-Marie Probert	282	42.2	+34.4
Liberal Democrats	Jacqui Carwardine	190	28.4	+1.9
Labour	Steve Horsfield	64	9.6	−8.6
Independent	Alan John Jones	62	9.3	N/A
Independent	Glenda Powell	45	6.7	N/A
Independent	Des Woods	16	2.4	N/A
TUSC	Amelia Washbourne	9	1.3	New
Majority		92	13.8	N/A
Turnout		672	22.0	
Rejected ballots		4	0.6	
Conservative gain from True Independents		Swing	N/A	

The by-election was triggered by the death of the sitting True Independents councillor, Bernard Hunt, in October 2020; the poll was delayed to the May 2021 elections, held nationally after the postponement of the previous year's local elections due to the COVID-19 pandemic.

==== Bromyard West ====
Bromyard West by-election: 10 March 2022
Party	Candidate	Votes	%	±%
Independent	Clare Davies	315	55.6	New
Independent	Nick Ferguson	152	26.8	New
Conservative	Mark Franklin	100	17.6	−22.2
Majority		163	28.7	N/A
Turnout		567	23.5	−3.6
Independent gain from It's Our County		Swing	N/A	

The by-election followed the resignation of It's Our County councillor Alan Seldon after 14.5 years on the council.

Date	Herefordshire Independents	Conservative	It's Our County	Greens	Lib Dems	True Independents	Labour	Independent	Coalition Majority
Going into the 2023 election	12	14	6	7	6	6	1	1	-3
