= 2023 Herefordshire Council election =

2023 UK local government election

- 4 May 2023

All 53 seats to Herefordshire Council 27 seats needed for a majority
- Turnout: 37.3%

	First party	Second party	Third party
Leader	Jonathan Lester	Terry James	Ellie Chowns
Party	Conservative	Liberal Democrats	Green
Last election	13 seats, 34.2%	7 seats, 9.9%	7 seats, 13.1%
Seats before	14	6	7
Seats won	21	12	9
Seat change	▲8	▲5	▲2
Popular vote	18,940	13,257	7,299
Percentage	34.6%	24.2%	13.3%
Swing	▲0.4%	▲14.3%	▲0.2%
	Fourth party	Fifth party	Sixth party
Party	Independent	It's Our County	Labour
Last election	18 seats, 28.5%	8 seats, 8.7%	0 seats, 3.5%
Seats before	25 (Note: Of the 25 councillors prior to the election who did not belong to a registered political party, 18 formed the "Independents for Herefordshire" group led by David Hitchiner, 6 formed the "True Independents" group led by Bob Matthews, and 1 (Jim Kenyon) did not belong to any group.)	(Note: There were six councillors prior to the election who had been elected as It's Our County candidates, but all sat in the "Independents for Herefordshire" group. Of those six, three stood again for It's Our County in 2023 (Dave Boulter, Liz Harvey and David Summers), two stood as independent candidates (Elizabeth Foxton and John Harrington), and one did not stand for re-election (Tracy Bowes).)	1
Seats won	8	2	1
Seat change	▼10	▼6	▲1
Popular vote	11,834	896	2,235
Percentage	21.6%	1.6%	4.1%
Swing	▼6.9%	▼7.1%	▲0.6%
- Winner of each seat at the 2023 Herefordshire Council election
Leader before election
David Hitchiner
Independents for Herefordshire
No overall control
Leader after election
Jonathan Lester
Conservative
No overall control

The 2023 Herefordshire Council election took place on 4 May 2023 to elect members of Herefordshire Council in Herefordshire, England. This was on the same day as other local elections in the UK.

Prior to the election the council was under no overall control, being led by David Hitchiner of the Independents for Herefordshire group. After the election the council remained under no overall control, but the Conservatives gained seats and managed to form a minority administration led by Jonathan Lester.

== Summary ==
=== Election result ===
2023 Herefordshire Council election
Party	Candidates	Seats	Gains	Losses	Net gain/loss	Seats %	Votes %	Votes	+/−
Conservative	53	21	11	3	▲8	39.6	34.6	18,940	▲0.4
Liberal Democrats	53	12	6	1	▲5	22.6	24.2	13,257	▲14.3
Independent	45	8	3	13	▼10	15.1	21.6	11,834	▼6.9
Green	19	9	3	1	▲2	17.0	13.3	7,299	▲0.2
Labour	14	1	1	0	▲1	1.9	4.1	2,235	▲0.6
It's Our County	3	2	0	6	▼6	3.8	1.6	896	▼7.1
Reform	6	0	0	0	Steady	0.0	0.6	317	New

== Ward results ==
The Statement of Persons Nominated, which details the candidates standing in each ward, was released by Herefordshire Council following the close of nominations on 4 April 2023. The results were:

=== Arrow ===
Arrow
Party	Candidate	Votes	%	±%
Conservative	Roger Phillips*	950	72.8	▼7.0
Liberal Democrats	Dan Ciolte	181	13.9	N/A
Green	John Whitelegg	174	13.3	N/A
Majority		769	58.9	▼0.7
Turnout		1305	44.4	
Conservative hold				

=== Aylestone Hill ===
Aylestone Hill
Party	Candidate	Votes	%	±%
Labour	Adam Spencer	379	37.9	N/A
Independent	Ange Tyler*	256	25.6	▼48.6
Liberal Democrats	Anna Davey	177	17.7	N/A
Conservative	Alexander Walsh	160	16.0	▼9.8
Reform	Fiona Stokes	28	2.8	N/A
Majority		123	12.3	▼36.1
Turnout		1007	40.3	
Labour gain from Independent				

=== Backbury ===
Backbury
Party	Candidate	Votes	%	±%
Conservative	Graham Biggs	394	35.2	▲5.7
Liberal Democrats	James Vidler	385	34.4	N/A
Independent	John Hardwick*	341	30.4	▼40.1
Majority		9	0.8	▼40.2
Turnout		1120	43.4	
Conservative gain from Independent				

=== Belmont Rural ===
Belmont Rural
Party	Candidate	Votes	%	±%
Liberal Democrats	Mark Dykes	315	35.8	N/A
Conservative	Andy Cooper	207	23.4	▲3.0
Independent	Alan Jones	199	22.6	N/A
Independent	Rachael Percival	93	10.6	N/A
Reform	Nigel Ely	67	7.6	N/A
Majority		108	12.4	▼46.8
Turnout		883	31.1	
Liberal Democrats gain from It's Our County				

=== Birch ===
Birch
Party	Candidate	Votes	%	±%
Green	Toni Fagan*	562	45.1	▼19.4
Conservative	Michael Agyeman	533	42.8	▲7.3
Liberal Democrats	Alex Griffiths	151	12.1	N/A
Majority		29	2.3	▼26.7
Turnout		1246	48.3	
Green hold				

=== Bircher ===
Bircher
Party	Candidate	Votes	%	±%
Conservative	Dan Hurcomb	754	49.2	▲43.5
Independent	Sebastian Bowen*	516	33.7	▼60.6
Green	Tessa Smith-Winnard	137	8.9	N/A
Liberal Democrats	Angharad Pope	126	8.2	N/A
Majority		258	15.5	▼73.1
Turnout		1535	47.3	
Conservative gain from Independent				

=== Bishops Frome and Cradley ===
Bishops Frome and Cradley
Party	Candidate	Votes	%	±%
Green	Ellie Chowns*	801	68.9	▼9.7
Conservative	Mark Franklin	316	27.2	▲5.8
Liberal Democrats	Robert Turner	45	3.9	N/A
Majority		515	41.7	▼15.5
Turnout		1166	43.72	
Green hold				

=== Bobblestock ===
Bobblestock
Party	Candidate	Votes	%	±%
Liberal Democrats	Rob Owens	244	29.4	N/A
Conservative	Clive Butler	241	29.0	▲2.0
Independent	Tim Price*	202	24.3	▼24.9
Labour	Anna Coda	143	17.3	N/A
Majority		3	0.4	−21.8
Turnout		836	31.93	
Liberal Democrats gain from Independent				

=== Bromyard Bringsty ===
Bromyard Bringsty
Party	Candidate	Votes	%	±%
Conservative	Peter Stoddart	562	47.4	▼5.6
Green	Karen Rock	370	31.2	N/A
Independent	Roger Page	139	11.7	▼35.3
Liberal Democrats	Clare Hobbs	115	9.7	N/A
Majority		198	16.2	▲10.2
Turnout		1191	27.35	
Conservative hold				

=== Bromyard West ===
Bromyard West
Party	Candidate	Votes	%	±%
Independent	Clare Davies*	412	62.2	N/A
Conservative	Paul Harper	116	17.5	▼22.4
Labour	Liam Holman	86	13.0	N/A
Liberal Democrats	Clare West	48	7.3	N/A
Majority		296	44.7	▲24.5
Turnout		664	27.35	
Independent gain from It's Our County				

=== Castle ===
Castle
Party	Candidate	Votes	%	±%
Conservative	Robert Highfield	346	28.6	▼8.8
Independent	Alan Watkins	345	28.5	N/A
Independent	Rob Rimmer	316	26.1	N/A
Liberal Democrats	Scott Shaw	203	16.8	N/A
Majority		1	0.1	▼25.1
Turnout		1117	43.34	
Conservative gain from Independent				

=== Central ===
Central
Party	Candidate	Votes	%	±%
Green	Catherine Gennard	413	46.4	▼7.5
Liberal Democrats	Mal Williams	268	30.0	▲8.0
Conservative	Michael Gray	210	23.6	▲9.8
Majority		145	16.4	15.5
Turnout		900	35.3	
Green hold				

=== College ===
College
Party	Candidate	Votes	%	±%
Liberal Democrats	Ben Proctor	230	29.5	N/A
Labour	Kath Hey*	222	28.5	N/A
Conservative	Rachel Taylor	209	26.8	▼9.9
Independent	Ian Skyrme	73	9.4	N/A
Independent	Amanda Yilmaz	46	5.8	N/A
Majority		8	1.0	▼8.5
Turnout		785	28.6	
Liberal Democrats gain from It's Our County				

=== Credenhill ===
Credenhill
Party	Candidate	Votes	%	±%
Independent	Bob Matthews*	351	38.3	▼42.6
Conservative	Gareth Johnston	308	33.6	▲14.5
Liberal Democrats	Paula Chambers	137	15.0	N/A
Independent	Charlie Taylor	120	13.1	N/A
Majority		43	4.7	−57.1
Turnout		917	36.0	
Independent hold				

=== Dinedor Hill ===
Dinedor Hill
Party	Candidate	Votes	%	±%
Conservative	David Davies	401	38.9	▼9.3
Liberal Democrats	Cat Hornsey	370	35.9	N/A
It's Our County	David Summers*	260	25.2	▼26.6
Majority		31	3.0	▼0.6
Turnout		1042	36.8	
Conservative gain from It's Our County				

=== Eign Hill ===
Eign Hill
Party	Candidate	Votes	%	±%
Independent	Elizabeth Foxton*	440	38.4	N/A
Liberal Democrats	Sam Potts	261	22.8	▲6.9
Labour	Steven Woolley	238	20.8	N/A
Conservative	Anthony Thompson	207	18.0	▲0.5
Majority		179	15.6	▼33.5
Turnout		1151	41.5	
Independent gain from It's Our County				

=== Golden Valley North ===
Golden Valley North
Party	Candidate	Votes	%	±%
Conservative	Philip Price	584	46.6	▲9.9
Independent	Jennie Hewitt*	492	39.2	▼13.5
Liberal Democrats	Brett Jenkins	178	14.2	N/A
Majority		92	7.4	▼8.6
Turnout		1261	50.4	
Conservative gain from Independent				

=== Golden Valley South ===
Golden Valley South
Party	Candidate	Votes	%	±%
Independent	Peter Jinman*	594	52.3	▼21.1
Conservative	Dave Greenow	400	35.2	▲21.6
Liberal Democrats	Duncan Starling	142	12.5	N/A
Majority		194	17.1	▼42.7
Turnout		1147	43.2	
Independent hold				

=== Greyfriars ===
Greyfriars
Party	Candidate	Votes	%	±%
Green	Diana Toynbee*	398	41.3	▼11.6
Liberal Democrats	Matt Lane	261	27.0	▲18.4
Conservative	Keith Farmer	214	22.2	▲10,6
Independent	Neil Clark	92	9.5	N/A
Majority		137	11.7	▼11.7
Turnout		1147	43.2	
Green hold				

=== Hagley ===
Hagley
Party	Candidate	Votes	%	±%
Independent	Ivan Powell	407	33.0	N/A
Conservative	Josh Smith	381	30.8	▼14.6
Liberal Democrats	Stephen Williams	224	18.1	N/A
Independent	Paul Andrews*	223	18.1	▼36.5
Majority		26	2.2	▼7.0
Turnout		1245	38.2	
Independent gain from Independent				

=== Hampton ===
Hampton
Party	Candidate	Votes	%	±%
Conservative	Bruce Baker	545	44.2	▲0.8
Independent	John Harrington*	420	34.1	N/A
Liberal Democrats	William Motley	268	21.7	N/A
Majority		125	10.1	▼3.1
Turnout		1238	42.7	
Conservative gain from It's Our County				

=== Hinton & Hunderton ===
Hinton & Hunderton
Party	Candidate	Votes	%	±%
Liberal Democrats	Kevin Tillett*	417	66.9	▲32.7
Conservative	Jeremy Chapman	126	20.2	▲11.6
Independent	Amanda Martin	80	12.8	N/A
Majority		191	46.7	▲38.7
Turnout		625	20.8	
Liberal Democrats hold				

=== Holmer ===
Holmer
Party	Candidate	Votes	%	±%
Conservative	Frank Cornthwaite	366	33.4	▼3.1
Liberal Democrats	Paul Stevens	315	28.7	N/A
Independent	Stephen Tannatt Nash	205	18.7	▼11.9
Independent	John Phipps	159	14.5	▼18.3
Independent	Mark Weaden	51	4.7	N/A
Majority		41	4.7	▲1.0
Turnout		1104	32.8	
Conservative hold				

=== Hope End ===
Hope End
Party	Candidate	Votes	%	±%
Green	Helen Heathfield	856	59.5	N/A
Conservative	Keith Pieri	461	32.0	▼26.1
Liberal Democrats	Kim James	122	8.5	N/A
Majority		395	27.5	▲15.9
Turnout		1447	48.8	
Green gain from Conservative		Swing		

=== Kerne Bridge ===
Kerne Bridge
Party	Candidate	Votes	%	±%
Conservative	Simeon Cole	442	39.9	▼6.6
Liberal Democrats	Sarah Freer	300	27.1	N/A
Independent	Katie Fowler	280	25.3	N/A
Independent	Andrew Terry	85	7.7	N/A
Majority		142	12.8	▲5.8
Turnout		1124	43.1	
Conservative gain from Independent				

=== Kings Acre ===
Kings Acre
Party	Candidate	Votes	%	±%
Conservative	Robert Williams	270	32.2	▲2.7
Independent	Graham Andrews*	240	28.6	▼41.5
Liberal Democrats	Debbie Hobbs	236	28.1	N/A
Independent	James Murphy	93	11.1	N/A
Majority		30	3.6	▼37.4
Turnout		847	32	
Conservative gain from Independent				

=== Kington ===
Kington
Party	Candidate	Votes	%	±%
Liberal Democrats	Terry James*	487	48.5	▼32.7
Green	Helen Hamilton	304	30.2	N/A
Independent	Fred Hawkins	115	11.5	N/A
Conservative	Natasha Saunders	98	9.8	▼9.0
Majority		83	18.3	▼44.1
Turnout		1005	39.1	
Liberal Democrats hold				

=== Ledbury North ===
Ledbury North
Party	Candidate	Votes	%	±%
It's Our County	Liz Harvey*	424	44.0	▼10.5
Independent	Ewan Sinclair	231	24.0	N/A
Liberal Democrats	Gem Murray	172	17.9	N/A
Conservative	Cole Fellows	136	14.1	▼31.4
Majority		293	20	▲11.0
Turnout		969	36.8	
It's Our County hold				

=== Ledbury South ===
Ledbury South
Party	Candidate	Votes	%	±%
Green	Stef Simmons	424	38.6	N/A
Conservative	Helen l'Anson*	352	32.0	▼6.6
Liberal Democrats	Matthew Eakin	241	21.9	▼11.3
Labour	Will Hopkins	82	7.5	▼12.8
Majority		72	6.6	▲1.2
Turnout		1101	38.3	
Green gain from Conservative				

=== Ledbury West ===
Ledbury West
Party	Candidate	Votes	%	±%
Green	Justine Peberdy	431	46.1	N/A
Conservative	Rachel F. Finch	218	23.3	▲0.3
Liberal Democrats	Phillip Howells*	194	20.8	▼8.7
Labour	Jonathan Browning	91	9.8	N/A
Majority		213	15.2	▼29.4
Turnout		936	34.5	
Green gain from Liberal Democrats				

=== Leominster East ===
Leominster East
Party	Candidate	Votes	%	±%
Green	Jenny Bartlett*	452	50.0	▼22.3
Conservative	Simon Donegan	315	34.8	▲7.1
Liberal Democrats	Marcus Murray	137	15.2	N/A
Majority		137	15.2	▼29.4
Turnout		908	30.5	
Green hold				

=== Leominster North and Rural ===
Leominster North and Rural
Party	Candidate	Votes	%	±%
Conservative	John Stone*	524	49.0	▼14.7
Green	Bryony John	456	42.7	▲6.4
Liberal Democrats	Mary Springer	89	8.3	N/A
Majority		68	6.3	▼21.1
Turnout		1075	34.8	
Conservative hold				

=== Leominster South ===
Leominster South
Party	Candidate	Votes	%	±%
Green	Mark Woodall	379	45.0	▼27.7
Conservative	Angeline Logan	262	31.1	▲3.8
Liberal Democrats	Lorraine Chatwin	104	12.3	N/A
Labour Co-op	Nick Comley	98	11.6	N/A
Majority		117	13.9	▼31.5
Turnout		851	32.0	
Green hold				

=== Leominster West ===
Leominster West
Party	Candidate	Votes	%	±%
Conservative	Allan Williams	371	49.7	▲35.0
Green	Jill Hanna	267	35.7	▼36.9
Liberal Democrats	Clive Thomas	109	14.6	▲1.9
Majority		104	14.0	▼43.9
Turnout		754	34.9	
Conservative gain from Green				

=== Llangarron ===
Llangarron
Party	Candidate	Votes	%	±%
Conservative	Elissa Swinglehurst*	652	54.2	Steady
Liberal Democrats	Michelle Stetchfield	551	45.8	N/A
Majority		101	8.4	Steady
Turnout		1217	56.4	
Conservative hold				

=== Mortimer ===
Mortimer
Party	Candidate	Votes	%	±%
Conservative	Carole Gandy*	562	54.8	▲1.2
Liberal Democrats	Susan Roberts	246	24.0	▲2.2
Green	Callum Coomber	217	21.2	N/A
Majority		316	30.8	1.8
Turnout		1036	38.8	
Conservative hold				

=== Newton Farm ===
Newton Farm
Party	Candidate	Votes	%	±%
Liberal Democrats	Jacqui Carwardine	277	44.7	▲18.2
Labour	Joe Emmett	201	32.4	▲14.2
Conservative	John Jones	142	22.9	▲15.1
Majority		76	12.3	▲7.9
Turnout		19.9	622	
Liberal Democrats gain from Independent				

=== Old Gore ===
Old Gore
Party	Candidate	Votes	%	±%
Conservative	Barry Durkin*	524	44.4	▼13.9
Independent	Gemma Davies	372	31.5	N/A
Liberal Democrats	Linden Delves	285	24.1	N/A
Majority		152	13.2	▼3.4
Turnout		1188	47.2	
Conservative hold				

=== Penyard ===
Penyard
Party	Candidate	Votes	%	±%
Conservative	Harry Bramer	738	57.4	▲13.8
Liberal Democrats	John Winder	547	42.6	N/A
Majority		191	14.8	▲10.7
Turnout		1297	41.9	
Conservative gain from Independent				

=== Queenswood ===
Queenswood
Party	Candidate	Votes	%	±%
Independent	Pauline Crockett*	346	31.2	▼49.6
Conservative	Nicholas Entwisle	290	26.1	▲6.9
Independent	Colin Williams	277	25.0	N/A
Liberal Democrats	Tim Fry	196	17.7	N/A
Majority		56	5.1	▼56.5
Turnout		1113	40.1	
Independent hold				

=== Red Hill ===
Red Hill
Party	Candidate	Votes	%	±%
Liberal Democrats	Dan Powell	539	64.1	▲27.4
Conservative	Steve Williams	302	35.9	▼3.9
Majority		247	28.2	▼8.0
Turnout		844	28.8	
Liberal Democrats gain from Conservative				

=== Ross East ===
Ross East
Party	Candidate	Votes	%	±%
Liberal Democrats	Ed O'Driscoll	417	36.5	▼9.5
Conservative	Becky Walsh	293	25.6	▼1.5
Independent	Milly Boylan	258	22.6	N/A
Labour	Nick Richmond	152	13.3	▲5.4
Independent	Adam Fielding	24	2.1	N/A
Majority		124	10.9	▼8.0
Turnout		1148	38.7	
Liberal Democrats hold				

=== Ross North ===
Ross North
Party	Candidate	Votes	%	±%
Liberal Democrats	Chris Bartrum*	350	37.7	▼37.4
Independent	Daniel Lister	313	33.8	N/A
Conservative	Valerie Coker	153	16.5	▼2.2
Labour	Melvin Hodges	111	12.0	▲5.2
Majority		37	3.9	▼52.5
Turnout		933	30.8	
Liberal Democrats hold				

=== Ross West ===
Ross West
Party	Candidate	Votes	%	±%
Liberal Democrats	Louis Stark*	423	43.3	▼4.0
Conservative	Nigel Gibbs	240	24.6	▼6.5
Independent	Rob Taylor	207	21.2	▼0.5
Labour	Edward Philpott	106	10.9	N/A
Majority		183	18.7	▲2.6
Turnout		982	36.4	
Liberal Democrats hold				

=== Saxon Gate ===
Saxon Gate
Party	Candidate	Votes	%	±%
Liberal Democrats	Aubrey Oliver	363	54.1	▲25.9
Conservative	William Norman	135	20.1	▲1.3
Independent	John Jones	123	18.3	N/A
Reform	Daniel Coughlin	50	7.5	N/A
Majority		228	34.0	▲9.2
Turnout		675	23.4	
Liberal Democrats gain from Independent				

=== Stoney Street ===
Stoney Street
Party	Candidate	Votes	%	±%
Independent	David Hitchiner	406	35.3	▼20.2
Conservative	Phillip Cutter	374	32.5	▲6.3
Liberal Democrats	David Howerski	371	32.2	▲13.9
Majority		32	2.8	▼26.5
Turnout		1155	40.0	
Independent hold				

=== Sutton Walls ===
Sutton Walls
Party	Candidate	Votes	%	±%
Conservative	Peter Hamblin	483	45.8	▼4.9
Green	Taylor Whitchurch	197	18.7	N/A
Liberal Democrats	Scott Richardson	192	18.2	N/A
Independent	Steve Williams	183	17.3	▼32.0
Majority		186	27.1	▲25.7
Turnout		1060	40.3	
Conservative hold				

=== Three Crosses ===
Three Crosses
Party	Candidate	Votes	%	±%
Conservative	Jonathan Lester*	763	55.6	▼6.0
Green	Rebecca Tully	461	33.7	▲4.7
Liberal Democrats	Duncan Cooper	142	10.4	N/A
Majority		302	21.9	▼1.3
Turnout		1372	47.0	
Conservative hold				

=== Tupsley ===
Tupsley
Party	Candidate	Votes	%	±%
Independent	Jim Kenyon*	556	48.0	▼31.9
Independent	Liz Board	335	28.9	N/A
Liberal Democrats	Hugh Brooks	142	12.3	N/A
Conservative	Patrick Pytka	125	10.8	▼9.3
Majority		221	19.1	▼31.7
Turnout		1159	46.7	
Independent hold				

=== Weobley ===
Weobley
Party	Candidate	Votes	%	±%
Conservative	Nicholas Mason	450	38.9	▲6.0
Independent	Mike Jones*	404	34.9	▼8.8
Liberal Democrats	Barry Ashton	304	26.3	N/A
Majority		46	4.0	▼6.8
Turnout		1171	39.3	
Conservative gain from Independent				

=== Whitecross ===
Whitecross
Party	Candidate	Votes	%	±%
It's Our County	Dave Boulter	212	29.8	▼17.9
Liberal Democrats	Emma Mayes	185	26.0	▲8.4
Conservative	Marsha Barnsley	143	20.1	▲5.6
Labour	Billie Kupeli	122	17.1	N/A
Reform	Richard Smith	50	7.0	N/A
Majority		27	3.8	▼23.8
Turnout		714	27.5	
It's Our County hold				

=== Widemarsh ===
Widemarsh
Party	Candidate	Votes	%	±%
Liberal Democrats	Polly Andrews*	233	38.9	▼0.6
Labour	Neil Barrington	204	34.1	N/A
Conservative	Kathy Handby	113	18.9	▲8.0
Reform	Mick Gunner	49	8.2	N/A
Majority		19	4.8	▼4.9
Turnout		604	25.4	
Liberal Democrats hold				

=== Wormside ===
Wormside
Party	Candidate	Votes	%	±%
Conservative	Richard Thomas	481	41.5	▼9.6
Independent	Simon Davies	362	31.3	N/A
Liberal Democrats	Edward Hickie	242	20.9	N/A
Reform	Robert Cribb	73	6.3	N/A
Majority		119	10.2	▼1.6
Turnout		1168	39.0	
Conservative hold				

== Changes 2023–2027 ==
- On 25 May 2023, Golden Valley South councillor Peter Jinman died. No by-election was held as the vacancy occurred within six months of the 2023 election.
- Following her election as Member of Parliament for North Herefordshire on 4 July 2024, Bishops Frome and Cradley councillor Ellie Chowns resigned from the council. Leadership of the Green group passed to Diana Toynbee.
- In late November 2025, Greyfriars councillor Diana Toynbee was suspended from the Green Party and joined the Independents for Herefordshire group.

=== By-elections ===
==== Credenhill ====
Credenhill by-election, 26 September 2024
Party	Candidate	Votes	%	±%
Independent	Charlie Taylor	201	33.8	N/A
Independent	Mike Jones	150	25.3	N/A
Conservative	Gareth Johnston	108	18.2	▼15.4
Reform	Brian Evans	89	15.0	N/A
Liberal Democrats	Debbie Hobbs	27	4.5	▼10.5
Labour	Mike Crofts	19	3.2	N/A
Majority		51	8.5	
Turnout		594	22.2	
Independent gain from Independent				

The Credenhill by-election was triggered by the death of independent councillor Bob Matthews on 20 June 2024. Matthews had been leader of the True Independents group and one of the longest-serving councillors on Herefordshire Council.

==== Bishops Frome and Cradley ====
Bishops Frome and Cradley by-election, 7 November 2024
Party	Candidate	Votes	%	±%
Green	Rebecca Tully	531	60.1	▼8.9
Conservative	Mark Franklin	215	24.3	▼2.9
Reform	Dave James	99	11.2	N/A
Liberal Democrats	Nicki West	27	3.1	▼0.8
Labour	Sandy Grenar	12	1.4	N/A
Majority		316	35.8	▼5.9
Turnout		884	33.2	
Green hold				

The Bishops Frome and Cradley by-election followed the resignation of Green councillor Ellie Chowns, who had been elected as the Member of Parliament for North Herefordshire on 4 July 2024.
