= Herefordshire Council =

Unitary local government authority for the county of Herefordshire in England

Coordinates: 52.053°N 2.694°W

Type
- Type: Unitary authority

History
- Founded: 1 April 1998
- Preceded by: Hereford and Worcester County Council

Leadership
- Chair: Roger Phillips, Conservative since 19 May 2023
- Leader: Jonathan Lester, Conservative since 19 May 2023
- Chief Executive: Paul Satoor since 26 June 2026

Structure
- Seats: 53 councillors
- Political groups: Administration (20) Conservative (20) Supported by (4) True Independents (2) Independent (2) Other parties (29) Liberal Democrat (12) Independents for Herefordshire (8) Green (8) Labour (1)

Elections
- Voting system: First past the post
- Last election: 4 May 2023
- Next election: 6 May 2027

Meeting place
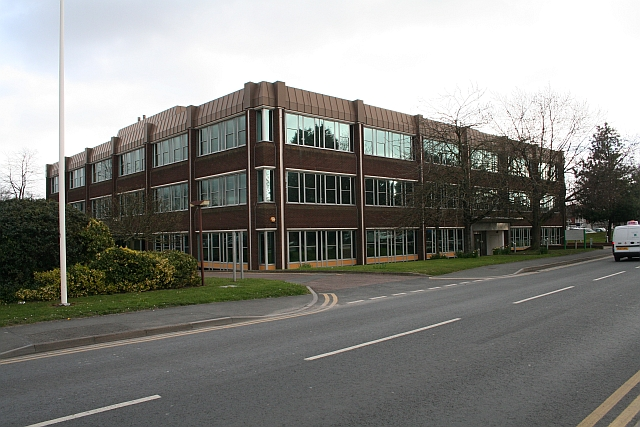
- Council Offices, Plough Lane, Hereford, HR4 0LE

Website
- www.herefordshire.gov.uk

Herefordshire Council is the local authority for the county of Herefordshire in England. It is a unitary authority, combining the powers of a district and county council. The council is based in Hereford. It has been under no overall control since 2019, and has been run by a minority Conservative administration since 2023.

== History ==
Herefordshire was one of the historic counties of England. Elected county councils were created in 1889 under the Local Government Act 1888, taking over the administrative functions of the quarter sessions. Herefordshire County Council existed until 1974 when the county was merged with neighbouring Worcestershire to form a new county of Hereford and Worcester.

Hereford and Worcester was abolished and Herefordshire re-established as a county on 1 April 1998. Formally the area is both a non-metropolitan county called "Herefordshire" and a non-metropolitan district called "County of Herefordshire", and it has a district council that also performs the functions of a county council. The council's formal name is therefore "County of Herefordshire District Council", but it styles itself "Herefordshire Council". The council created in 1998 was granted the right to use the coat of arms of the earlier county council which had been abolished in 1974.

== Governance ==
As a unitary authority, Herefordshire Council performs the functions of both a county council and a district council. The whole county is also covered by civil parishes, which form a lower tier of local government.

=== Political control ===
The council has been under no overall control since 2019. Following the 2023 election a minority Conservative administration took control of the council.

The first elections to the new Herefordshire Council were held in 1997, initially operating as a shadow authority alongside the outgoing authorities until the new arrangements came into effect on 1 April 1998. Political control of the council since 1998 has been as follows:

| Party in control | Years |
|---|---|
| Liberal Democrats | 1998–2000 |
| No overall control | 2000–2007 |
| Conservative | 2007–2019 |
| No overall control | 2019–present |

=== Leadership ===
The leaders of the council since 1998 have been:

| Councillor | Party | From | To |
|---|---|---|---|
| Terry James | Liberal Democrats | 1 Apr 1998 | May 2003 |
| Roger Phillips | Conservative | 23 May 2003 | May 2011 |
| John Jarvis | Conservative | 27 May 2011 | 24 May 2013 |
| Tony Johnson | Conservative | 24 May 2013 | 9 Mar 2018 |
| Jonathan Lester | Conservative | 9 Mar 2018 | May 2019 |
| David Hitchiner | Independent | 24 May 2019 | May 2023 |
| Jonathan Lester | Conservative | 19 May 2023 | |

=== Composition ===
Following the 2023 election, and subsequent by-elections and changes of allegiance up to January 2026, the composition of the council was:

| Party | Councillors |
|---|---|
| Conservative | 20 |
| Liberal Democrats | 12 |
| Independents for Herefordshire | 8 |
| Green | 8 |
| True Independents | 2 |
| Independent | 2 |
| Labour | 1 |
| Total | 53 |

Of the twelve independent councillors, eight sit as the "Independents for Herefordshire" group, two form the "True Independents" group, and the other two do not belong to any group. The next election is due in 2027.

== Elections ==
Since the last full review of boundaries in 2015 Herefordshire has comprised 53 wards, each of which elects one councillor. Elections are held every four years.

== Premises ==
The council has its headquarters at the Council Offices on Plough Lane in Hereford. The building was formerly the headquarters of H. P. Bulmer and was bought by the council in 2009 to use as offices. Council meetings also transferred there in 2022.

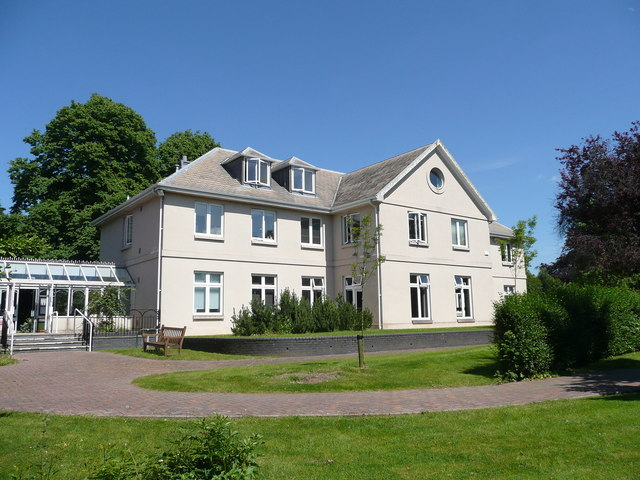
Brockington: Council's headquarters 1998–2014

When the council was created in 1998 it had its headquarters at Brockington, 35 Hafod Road, Hereford. Brockington had been built as a house in 1909 before serving as the headquarters of Herefordshire Constabulary from 1946 and then as the offices of South Herefordshire District Council from 1977 until 1998, in which time it was substantially extended.

The council continued to meet at Brockington until 2014, after which it was sold and the site redeveloped. Office functions moved to other buildings the council owned, notably the former Bulmers offices on Plough Lane. Council meetings were generally held at the Shirehall in Hereford between 2014 and 2020, when the ceiling there collapsed. Following the resumption of in-person meetings following the COVID-19 pandemic a conference room for meetings was established at the Council Offices on Plough Lane, first used for a full council meeting in May 2022.

== Outsourced services ==
Herefordshire Council has outsourced the following services:

- Human Resources and Finance – outsourced to a limited company named "Hoople", which is wholly owned by the Council and Wye Valley NHS Trust
- Leisure – Halo Leisure (a not-for-profit trust which operates all leisure services)
- Social Housing – Herefordshire Housing (a not-for-profit trust which operates all housing and accommodation services)
- Commercial Services – Amey Wye Valley Services (a commercial venture which maintains roads, grounds, street lighting, etc.)
- Waste Management – Severn Waste Management (responsible for refuse collection, sorting and recycling).
