= Dental education throughout the world =

Dentistry throughout the world is practiced differently, and training in dentistry varies as well.

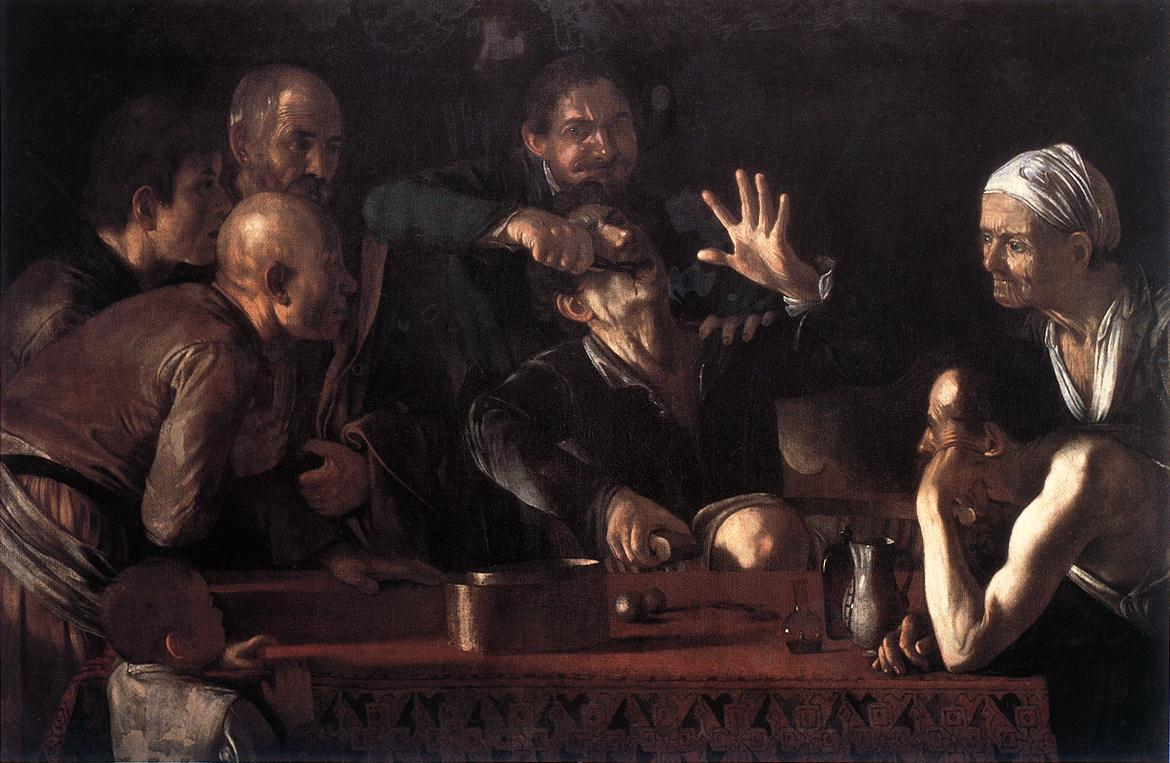
"The Toothpuller" —ascribed to Caravaggio (1571–1610)

== Africa and Middle East ==
=== Egypt ===
Dentistry in Egypt has a long history, with the dentist occupation first appearing as early as 3000 BC.

There is a syndicate for all dentists which regulate the work in dental clinics in association with the Ministry of Health. For dental clinicians to practise, they should be enrolled in the dental syndicate. Dentists complete a 5-year-study course plus 1 year of practice in their dental school or general hospitals in the country. Most governmental dental schools give degrees of Bachelor, Master's degree & PhD in all dental fields. However, obtaining a chance for postgraduate studies in the field of orthodontics is somehow difficult according to many of Egypt general dental practitioners.

=== Iran ===
In Iran dentists require six years of post-secondary education. The whole program is one single degree of D.D.S. (Doctor of Dental Surgery). After this, those wishing to specialize in a particular field may pursue higher education. Upon graduation, a dentist may need to fulfill two years of military service (as a dentist in uniform for males) or governmental service (both males and females) in order to collect enough scores to start in private practice. The current universities offering Dentistry are:

- Tehran University of Medical Sciences خانه
- Shahid Beheshti University of Medical Sciences
- Isfahan University of Medical Sciences
- Mashhad University of Medical Sciences
- Shiraz University of Medical Sciences
- Ahvaz Jundishapur University of Medical Sciences
- Kermanshah University
- Ghazvin University
- Zahedan University
- Tabriz University of Medical Sciences
- Babol University
- Rasht University
- Yazd University
- Kerman University
- Hamedan University
- Azad (Khorasgan-Isfahan) University
- Azad (Tehran) University
- Qom University of Medical Sciences (Dentistry school of MUQ)

=== Israel ===
In Israel there are two dental schools, The Hebrew University-Hadassah School of Dental Medicine in Jerusalem, founded by the Alpha Omega dental fraternity, and The Tel Aviv University School of Dental Medicine in Tel Aviv. The two schools provide Doctor of Dental Medicine (DMD) degrees. In addition, there are several post-graduation training centers such as Rambam Health Care Campus in Haifa and Barzilai Medical Center in Ashkelon. The post-graduation programs in the Sheba Medical Center in Tel Hashomer are held by the Medical Corps of the Israel Defense Forces.

== Americas ==
=== Brazil ===
The first step to becoming a dentist in Brazil is to take a 10-subject examination (Biology, Physics, Chemistry, Mathematics, Literature, Foreign Language, Portuguese, History, Geography and an Essay) which might be compared to the SAT exam in the US. These examinations vary from institution to institution; however, dentistry is one of the hardest courses to get in and most students come from upper classes due to the level of difficulty and steep tuition prices. Students must complete the 4 or 5-year Bachelor of Dental Surgery (B.D.S.). Skills capacitation courses after graduation are required in different dental areas, which take between 2 and 3 years (D.D.S). Universities of dental care are provided by both the private and public sector. The course's conclusion must be registered and licensed by the nationalized Dental Board of Brazil so that the students obtain the Dentistry Diploma. However, private clinics are the most common place a person would go if a dentist is needed. Today, the private market is dominated by large companies that hire mostly recently graduated dentists. Nevertheless, there are thousands of small clinics spread throughout the country. The practice of dentistry in Brazil is overseen by CFO Conselho Federal de Odontologia, a federal entity that coordinates the 26 state bodies plus Federal District. This institution has 340,000 registered dentists and 191 dental schools in Brazil. Brazil has become a leading country at the international level in areas such as Dentistry International Research, Implantology, Periodontics, Endodontics, Phrosthodontics, Aesthetics Dentistry, Pedodontics, Orthodontics, and Oral & Maxillofacial Surgery. Brazilian Dentistry Department develops, all over the country, many innovative techniques and conducts dentistry research related to different aspects. Dentists in the Mercosur are eligible to work in Argentina, Chile, Paraguay, Uruguay and Peru.

=== Canada ===
The practice of dentistry in Canada is overseen by the National Dental Association Examination Board of Canada (NDAEB), while specialization is overseen by the Royal College of Dentists. Today, Canada has about 16,000 dentists. Canadian dentistry is not publicly run (see Medicare (Canada)); however, some provinces provide for free dental care for children and the elderly. Other Canadians are mostly covered by workplace dental plans, but many have to pay out-of-pocket.

For most of the early colonial period dentistry was a rare and unusual practice in Canada. In severe situations, barbers or blacksmiths would pull a tooth, but for many years Canada lagged behind European advances. The first dentists in Canada were United Empire Loyalists who fled the American Revolution. The first recorded dentist in Canada was a Mr. Hume who advertised in a Halifax newspaper in 1814.

During the first half of the 19th century, dentistry expanded rapidly. In 1867 the Ontario Dental Association was formed and in 1868 they founded Canada's first dental school in Toronto, the Royal College of Dental Surgeons of Ontario. The University of Toronto agreed to be affiliated with the dental school. As time passed, other Canadian universities also created dentistry programmes. However, the University of Toronto still has the largest dental school in Canada that features the most postgraduate research opportunities as well as certifications for all the dental specialties. The UBC Faculty of Dentistry supports five specialty programs being Prosthodontics, Endodontics, Orthodontics, Pedodontics and Periodontics.

Dental care is not covered by the Canadian health care system, as it is in many other countries with public health care, although public dental services have long been provided to certain categories of the population. Nevertheless, studies have estimated that at least 6 million Canadians avoid going to a dentist because of the cost.

Canadian dental schools

- University of Toronto (1868)
- McGill University (1905)
- Université de Montréal (1905)
- Dalhousie University (1908)
- University of Alberta (1923)
- University of Manitoba (1958)
- University of British Columbia (1964)
- University of Western Ontario (1966)
- University of Saskatchewan (1968)
- Université Laval (1971)

Dental schools in the USA, Ireland, Australia and New Zealand are also recognized as accredited in Canada.

=== Chile ===
In Chile, dentists require six years of post secondary education which, after 2 years dedicated to fundamental scientific and medical knowledge (chemistry, physics, biology, morphology, anatomy, histology, etc.) puts a particular emphasis on practice and the accountability to patients in the last 4 years. Specialization programs of 3–4 years (admission by competition) are possible after a minimum of 3 years' working experience has been completed. The first dental school was established at the Universidad de Chile in the year 1888. Other institutions providing professional dental education in Chile are Universidad Austral de Chile since 2004, Universidad de Concepción since 1919, Pontificia Universidad Católica de Chile (since 2009), Universidad de Valparaíso since 1952, Universidad de la Frontera (since 1992), Universidad de Talca, which are public universities, and the following private universities: Universidad Finis Terrae, Universidad Nacional Andrés Bello, Universidad Mayor, Universidad de los Andes, Universidad Diego Portales, Universidad del Desarrollo, Universidad San Sebastián and Universidad de Antofagasta. After having been influenced for decades by both the European (especially from German-speaking countries) and North American dentistry, Chilean education and practice in dentistry have now reached a self-sufficient level and benefits from a range of top-level institutes, professors and practitioners. Research has developed at a fast pace and many articles find their path to international publications.

=== Costa Rica ===
Dentistry is overseen by the Colegio de Cirujanos Dentistas de Costa Rica. Dentists complete 6-year courses from the University of Costa Rica in D.D.S. (Doctor of Dental Surgery), or similar courses from various private universities. Costa Rica is often cited as being one of the top ten countries in the world for medical tourism, including dentistry.

=== Peru ===
In Peru, dentists require five years of post secondary education in a university. There are several universities that provides dental education. The three first study years are similar education to the Human Medicine schools, then fourth and fifth years are dental studies and practices in the school clinic. In the last year, students have to complete evaluated and paid services in a public hospital and in a rural medical post (where there are no hospitals or doctors nearby, they will frequently have to deal with general medicine cases). The students obtain their degree in Dentistry (Bachelor's in Dentistry), if they want to practice in Peru the students have to prepare and defend a thesis to obtain the Cirujano Dentista (C.D.) degree (Dental Surgeon). Dentistry is overseen by the Colegio Odontológico del Perú (COP).

Peruvian dental schools

Lima

- Universidad Nacional Mayor de San Marcos.
- Universidad Nacional Federico Villarreal.
- Universidad Peruana Cayetano Heredia.
- Universidad de San Martín de Porres.
- Universidad Alas Peruanas.
- Universidad Privada San Juan Bautista.
- Universidad Científica del Sur.
- Universidad Peruana de Ciencias Aplicadas.

Chimbote

- Universidad Los Ángeles de Chimbote – ULADECH.

Tacna

- Universidad Nacional Jorge Basadre Grohmann.

Trujillo

- Universidad Nacional de Trujillo.
- Universidad Privada Antenor Orrego.

Iquitos

- Universidad Nacional de la Amazonía Peruana – UNAP.

Puno

- Universidad Nacional del Altiplano.

=== United States ===
In the United States dentistry is generally practiced by dentists who have completed a post-graduate course of professional education. This has resulted in a high quality of care. Government-sponsored health care programs Medicare does not cover routine dental treatment. Medicaid does provide extensive dental coverage and benefits for beneficiaries under the age of 21 under the early periodic screening diagnosis and treatment (EPSDT) and a growing number of states also offer comprehensive dental services for adult Medicaid members as well.

==== Dental education in the United States ====
In the United States, dentists earn either a D.D.S. (Doctor of Dental Surgery) or D.M.D. (Doctor of Dental Medicine) degree. There is no difference in the training for either degree. The degrees are equivalent, and recognized equally by all state boards of dentistry. There are 56 accredited dental schools in the United States requiring 4 years of post graduate study (except for one unique 3-year program at the University of the Pacific). Most applicants to dental school have attained at least a B.S. or B.A. degree, but a small percentage are admitted after only fulfilling specific prerequisite courses. So unlike many other countries (other than US, Canada, and Australia), it usually takes more than 8 years to become a dentist. The difference relates to the history involved in the division of medicine and surgery in medical practice.

There are limited opportunities for dental education in the United States with little growth in graduation rate from approximately 6700 ADA 2022 Number of Graduates, up from 5,750 in 1982. Due to the hands-on training required, dental education is expensive and is limited on subsidized funding towards dental education by the federal and most state governments. According to the American Dental Education Association, "average educational debt for all indebted dental school graduates in the Class of 2019 was $292,169."

Licensure is organized on three levels in most areas. Many dentists must pass National Boards, Regional Boards, and then take a jurisprudence exam accepted by their state to fulfill their requirements to get a state license. Not all states require or even accept regional boards. Although a state license is only valid in the issuing state, because of the regional boards a dentist may be able to apply for licensure in any other state within the jurisdiction of their regional board. There are many cooperative agreements between states that allow recognition of another state's license so as to procure a license either via "licensure by credentials" or "licensure by reciprocity." Although a national licensure exam has yet to be made, the American Dental Association (ADA) has worked with education and examining groups to form such an exam.

A dentist may go on for further training in a dental specialty which requires an additional 1 to 7 years of post-doctoral training. There are 9 recognized dental specialties. These include Endodontics (root canal treatment), Oral and Maxillofacial Pathology, Oral and Maxillofacial Radiology, Pediatric Dentistry, Periodontics (gums), Prosthodontics (complicated dental reconstruction), Orthodontics (moving teeth), Oral and Maxillofacial Surgery (surgery of the mouth and face), and Dental Public Health. There is no specialty in esthetic dentistry or implantology, and no additional training is required for a dentist to make the claim of being an esthetic or cosmetic dentist. Dentists are forbidden to claim that they are specialists in areas of practice in which there is no recognized specialty. They may limit their practices to a single area of dentistry, and claim that their practice is limited to that area.

Any general dentist may perform those procedures designated within the enumerated specialties if they deem themselves competent. Many general dentists train in certain aspects of the above specialties such as the placement and restoration of dental implants, advanced prosthodontics and endodontics, and have limited or heavily focused their practices to these areas. When a general dentist performs any procedure that falls within the realm of a specialty, they are expected to perform with the same level of expertise as a certified specialist and are legally held to such standards with respect to any issues of malpractice.

== Asia and the Pacific ==
=== Australia ===
Australian dentistry is overseen by the Australian Dental Council and the Dental Board of Australia. The professional body for dentists is the Australian Dental Association. Dentists trained in Australia must meet the entry requirements of one of the Australian institutions offering dental courses, and then complete the required full-time academic training leading to a dental degree. If dentists wish to specialize, they must complete extra study after having had clinical experience.

As of July 2010, in order to practice dentistry in Australia you must obtain registration and licensing from the nationalized Dental Board of Australia. Generally, the only persons immediately entitled to apply to be registered as dentists are persons holding the qualifications of DDS, BDS, BDSc, BDent, BDentSc, DMD, MDent, or GradDipDent from an accredited Australian and New Zealand university. Usually registration will not be granted to a foreign graduate until he or she has passed the ADC examinations and/or completed a 2-year advance standing program in order to obtain a locally accredited dental qualification

The Universities of Queensland, Adelaide, Western Australia, Griffith, James Cook, Charles Sturt and Latrobe all offer undergraduate dental degree courses of 5 years in length. Sydney University offers a graduate entry program which is 4 years duration and requires a previous bachelor's degree for admission. Melbourne University also has a 4-year graduate entry dental program starting in 2011. The qualifications awarded by these schools satisfy the formal academic requirements for registration.

Australian dental schools include but are not limited to:

- University of Adelaide
- University of Melbourne
- University of Queensland
- University of Sydney
- University of Western Australia
- La Trobe University
- Griffith University
- James Cook University
- Charles Sturt University

=== Hong Kong ===
To become a dentist in Hong Kong, one must complete the 6-year Bachelor of Dental Surgery (B.D.S.) course in The University of Hong Kong. Students learn basic health sciences, dental sciences under a problem-based learning curriculum. Besides, formal training and supervised practice are prescribed. It is accepted that only after 5 years of such training would the trainees achieve a superior level of professional competence.

Graduates can enter general practice or pursue a specialist M.D.S. degree after gaining one to two years of working experience.

Before the dental school was established in the University of Hong Kong (in 1980), most of the practicing dentists obtained their dental degree from the Philippines.

=== India ===
In India, dentistry is through the BDS (Bachelor of Dental Surgery) degree, which includes 4 years of study and 1-year of compulsory internship. As of 2010, there were a total of 291 colleges (39 run by the government and 252 in the private sector) offering dental education. This amounts to an annual intake of 23,690 graduates. Dental education in India is regulated by the Dental Council of India.

In most states, 15% of seats in state run Dental Colleges are filled through a national examination conducted by the CBSE (Central Board for Secondary Education). The remaining seats are filled up by the respective state's designated authority. Some autonomous universities conduct their own selection tests. Selection to privately run Dental Colleges vary and usually require payment of higher fees.

Post graduate training is for three years in the concerned specialty. Master of Dental Surgery (MDS) is offered in the following subjects -

- Prosthodontics
- Periodontics
- Oral and Maxillofacial Surgery
- Conservative Dentistry & Endodontics
- Orthodontics & Dentofacial Orthopaedics
- Oral Pathology & Microbiology
- Public Health Dentistry
- Pedodontics and Preventive Dentistry
- Oral Medicine Diagnosis and Radiology.

Since 2016, NEET (National Eligibility cum Entrance Test) has started for all aspirants – Indian & Foreign. No Autonomous University can conduct its own exam anymore.

Selection to postgraduate courses are through national / state entrance examinations (NEET) and are very competitive. There are several short term Hands on courses available in India now as of 2025 for fresh beginners. In addition, certificate courses of 2 years duration are offered in Dental Mechanics and Dental Hygiene.

List of dental colleges in India – (lisi of dental colleges)

=== Malaysia ===
The first dental degree program in Malaysia was offered by University of Malaya. The qualification was moderated and recognised by the Malaysian Dental Council and one of the leading associations representing dental surgeons of Malaysia is the Malaysian Dental Association.

Dental surgeries (or better known as dental clinics) in Malaysia are required to be registered and approved by the Ministry of Health Malaysia under the Healthcare Facilities And Services Act 1998. It is a requirement that all dental surgeons hold a valid Annual Practising Certificate. Foreign dentists, that is, qualified dentists from other countries are not allowed to hold an annual practising certificate unless they are studying or lecturing at a higher-learning institute.

=== New Zealand ===
New Zealand dentistry is overseen by the Dental Council, while specialization is also overseen by the Royal Australasian College of Dental Surgeons.

The Faculty of Dentistry at the University of Otago is New Zealand's only dental school that offers the required academic training. Entry into New Zealand's only dental school requires the student to compete into the second year dentistry course via the Health Sciences First Year course. Once in the course, students will start their dental education in their second year of university study. The total time to complete the course, including the first-year competitive course, is 5 years of full-time academic study.

=== Pakistan ===
The history of dentistry in Pakistan started before the country's independence. Pakistan's premier and oldest dental institution De'Montmorency College of Dentistry was established in 1934 at Lahore by then Governor of Punjab Sir Jeff Fitz Harway de' Montmorency. Later in 1974, Nishtar Institute of Dentistry joined the list. De'Montmorency College of Dentistry has a very rich heritage of academic and clinical excellence both before and after independence. The history of dentistry in Pakistan is in fact the story of progress of de'Montmorency College of Dentistry. At present there are 32 dental schools (public & private) throughout Pakistan, according to the Pakistan Medical and Dental Council the state regulatory body has upwards of 11500 registered dentists. The four-year training culminates in achieving a Bachelor of Dental Surgery (BDS) degree, which requires a further one year compulsory internship to be a registered dentist in Pakistan. As per recent stats, According to the Pakistan Medical Commission, there are almost 28,561 registered BDS doctors in January 2021.

=== Philippines ===
Most Filipino Dentists must earn a total of 6 years of dental school (2 years preparatory; 4 years proper) to obtain the degree Doctor of Dental Medicine (D.M.D.). Presently, the country has a total of 25 dental schools, in which the board licensing is administered and regulated by the Board of Dentistry of the Professional Regulation Commission.

- Adventist University of the Philippines
- Cebu Doctors' University
- Centro Escolar University
- Emilio Aguinaldo College
- Iloilo Doctors' College
- Our Lady of Fatima University
- Lyceum-Northwestern University
- Lyceum of the Philippines University, Batangas
- Manila Central University
- Medina College Pagadian City
- Mindanao Medical Foundation College
- Misamis University
- National University (Philippines)
- Negros Oriental State University
- Southwestern University PHINMA (Philippines)
- University of Baguio
- University of the East College of Dentistry
- University of Perpetual Help System
- University of the Philippines
- University of the Visayas

=== Taiwan ===
All the dental schools are undergraduate entry in Taiwan. After graduating from high school, students are required to take a 6-year dental program to complete their DDS/DMD degree. Dental school admissions are competitive in Taiwan. Only students obtain top 3% of academic results in the Taiwan Joint College Entrance Exam for admission in Taiwan will be admitted. The tuition for dental schools are around TWD 70,000-75,000 (~USD 2,200-2,400) per semester. Students are also required to pay additional fees for tools and other materials most of time. Students should complete 5 years of medical basic and dental professional courses at their own universities, followed by a year of internships before graduation. During summer vacation, clerkship is recommended for students to acquire experience for the future. The first dental school in Taiwan belonged to the School of Dentistry at National Taiwan University which was founded in 1953. Dental schools in Taiwan include:

- China Medical University
- Chung Shan Medical University
- Kaohsiung Medical University
- National Defense Medical Center
- National Taiwan University
- National Yang Ming Chiao Tung University
- Taipei Medical University

=== Thailand ===
The Thai Dental Council, established in 1994, is the premier governing body of dental practice, and now on formulating uniform competency requirements for dental practitioners, thus directly influencing the teaching programs at the dental schools. The Ministry of Public Health plays an important role in dental manpower planning for the dental public health services. The Thai Dental Council, the Ministry of Public Health and the Consortium of the Dental Schools work together to promote scientifically based dental education. In addition, the Thai government is placing more importance on the dental public health of its citizens.

In 2007 the number of Thai Dentists in the workforce was 7175,2093,1400 and 76 for dentists, dental nurses, chairside assistants, and laboratory technicians. In 2009, the number of dentists in public sector was 3,892 and in private practice 4,551. There were 849 and 218 dentists in the university and military.

== Europe ==
In all European countries, there exist public dental services and/or subsidies that ensure that most (if not all) citizens have access to the dental services they require, regardless of their ability to pay. Information regarding the various levels of dental care provision throughout Europe can be found in the Manual of Dental Practice, published by the Council of European Dentists.

=== Finland ===
In Finland, education in dentistry is through a 5.5 year Licenciate of Dental Medicine (DMD or DDS) course, which is offered after high school graduation. Application is by a national combined dental and medical school entry examination. As of 2011, dentistry is provided by Faculties of Medicine in 4 universities:

- University of Helsinki
- University of Turku
- University of Oulu
- University of Eastern Finland, Kuopio Campus

1st phase of training begins with a unified 2-year pre-clinical training for dentists and physicians. Problem-based learning (PBL) is employed depending on the university. 3rd year autumn consists of clinico-theoretical phase in pathology, genetics, radiology and public health and is partially combined with physicians' 2nd phase. 3rd phase clinical training lasts for the remaining 3 years and includes periods of being on call at University Central Hospital Trauma Centre, Clinic of Oral and Maxillofacial Diseases and at the Children's clinic. Candidates who successfully complete the 4th year of training qualify for a paid summer rotation in a Community health center of their choice. Annual intake of dentists into Faculties of Medicine is a national total 160 students.

Ph.D. research is strongly encouraged and is mandatory alongside post graduate training. Post graduate training is available in all 4 universities and lasts an additional 4–6 years.

=== Italy ===
==== Organization ====
In Italy dentists complete 6 years of undergraduate study to earn a degree. Nevertheless, it is possible to agree on certain basic clinical competences common to all member states of the European Union.

Admission to Dentistry school is regulated by an entrance test, also used for Medical schools, composed of 80 questions about five subjects: biology, chemistry, mathematics, physics and general knowledge.

=== Malta ===
The first course leading to a degree in Dental Surgery, at the University of Malta, commenced in 1933. The qualification was recognized by the Medical Council of the United Kingdom in 1936.

Dental Surgery was established as a separate Faculty in 1954, previous to which the course was under the direction of a Board of Studies within the Faculty of Medicine and Surgery. The faculty caters for an undergraduate intake of 8 students annually. A B.Ch.D Degree is awarded at the completion of the 5-year course.

=== Netherlands ===
==== Organization ====
All practicing dentists must be subscribed in the national medical register called the BIG-register. The registry can be freely consulted through the internet, if one wants to check if his or her dentist has got the right credentials.

==== Education ====
The dental curriculum was just changed from 5 years study to 6 years. There are three dental schools in the Netherlands:

- Amsterdam (ACTA): a joint venture between the University of Amsterdam (UvA) and Vrije Universiteit Amsterdam (VU)
- Groningen University
- Nijmegen University

The oldest dental education in the Netherlands used to be taught at the University of Utrecht. The faculty of dentistry in Utrecht was closed because of governmental economizing.

=== Norway ===
The 5-year dental education is offered at three universities:

- University of Oslo
- University of Bergen
- University of Tromsø

All dentists in Norway are organized through "Tannlegeforeningen". Dental services are free for children. Some complicated procedures such as the fitting of new prosthesis and some oral surgeries are partially covered by the national health service, usually at the rate of 50%.

=== Poland ===
NFZ (National Health Fund) in Poland provides 100% cover only for basic dental health services.

=== Portugal ===
All the dental schools are undergraduate entry in Portugal. After graduating from high school, students are required to take a 5-year dental program to complete their DDS/DMD degree. There are 7 dental schools with 3 being public.

=== Slovakia ===
In Slovakia, dentists complete 6 years of undergraduate study to earn a MDDr. (lat. Medicinae Dentalis Doctor) degree. A MDDr. graduate can perform the therapeutic interventions in area of restorative dentistry, prosthodontics and endodontics. For performing orthodontics a post graduate course is required in length of 3 years and for dentoalveolar surgery the post graduate course in length of at least 6 months is required. For oral and maxillofacial surgery the length of 4 years of post graduate course is required. Also the absolvent of general medicine (titled as MUDr.) can run course for oral and maxillofacial surgery, but the attestation course takes five years. Dental education is offered at three universities: Comenius University in Bratislava, Slovak Medical University in Bratislava and University of Pavol Jozef Safarik in Košice. Part of dental service is paid from health insurance but mostly treatment (fillings, prosthodontics) is paid cash by patients.

=== Sweden ===
The 5-year dental education is offered at four universities:

- Malmö University
- Karolinska Institutet, at Huddinge Hospital

Most dentists in Sweden are organized through "Tandläkarförbundet" which also issues the scientific 'Swedish Dental Journal'.

Dental care is provided at public and private dental offices. Dental services are free for everyone up to 20 years of age. From the age of 20 and upwards there is a fixed state refund which usually is, depending on the dentist's fee and what type of dentistry performed, around 10% – 15% of the total cost. For more expensive dental work above the age of 65 the patients only pay 7800 SEK (~ $1,000) plus the cost of the dental material that was used.

The English title given to dental graduates in Sweden is D.D.S (University Degree in Dental Surgery) until 2013. Due to the implementation of Bologna the dental high schools changed the title D.D.S to Degree of Master of Science in Dental Surgery and also awarding a purely academic title of Master of Science (120 credits) in Dental Science.

All dentists in the European Union/EES are eligible to work in Sweden. Dentists with an exam outside EES are required to take a one-year course at Karolinska in Stockholm. From April 15, 2016, fluent Swedish language is required also for Dentists with exam from EES.

=== United Kingdom ===
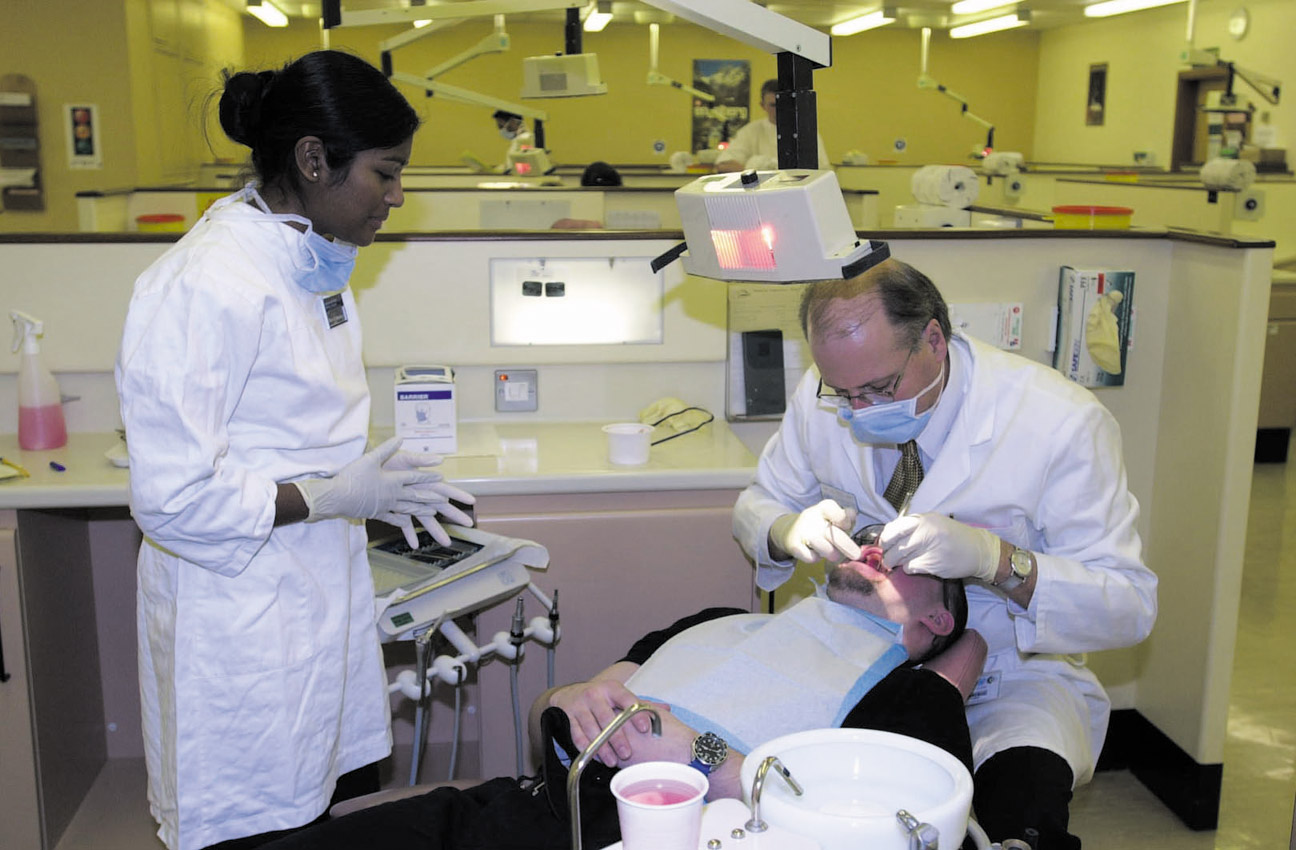
An NHS dentist performing an examination

==== Education and registration ====
In the United Kingdom, dentists complete 5 years of undergraduate study to earn a B.D.S. or BChD degree. After graduating most dentists will enter a V.T. (vocational training) scheme, of either 1 or 2 years length, to receive their full National Health Service registration. Dentists must register with the G.D.C. (General Dental Council), and meet their requirements as the governing body of the profession, before being allowed to practice. The Dentists Act 1957 defines dentistry with the intention of confining the practice of dentistry to those on the Dental Register. It provided the following definition: "For the purposes of this Act, the practice of dentistry shall be deemed to include the performance of any such operation and the giving of any such treatment, advice or attendance as is usually performed or given by dentists."

There are sixteen dental schools in the UK, five of which are graduate entry programmes, only admitting applicants with at least an upper 2.1 in a classified undergraduate degree with a significant component of biomedical sciences. Thus the competition for places is fierce (approximately 1 successful candidate admitted in every 41 applicants in 2018). Because of the low numbers of dental schools, funding for building and service developments in the schools can be very high. Well known UK universities providing dental courses are the universities of Leeds, Liverpool, Glasgow, Cardiff, Queen's Belfast, Birmingham, Bristol, Dundee, Manchester, Plymouth, Sheffield, Queen Mary, London and King's College London. As of 2013, the only UK universities offering a 4-year graduate-entry BDS programme are Liverpool, King's College London, BLSMD, UCLan and Aberdeen.

==== Dental practice ====
Dentists may undertake work under the National Health Service or privately. The may opt for either of these alternatives, or both.

== See also ==
- Dental degree
