= Healthsouk =

Health plan

HealthSouk
- Website type: Technology
- Headquarters: Mountain View, California, United States
- Key people: Neilesh Patel DDS (CEO, co-founder),
- Website: www.healthsouk.com

HealthSouk is the United States' first health plan without monthly fees. It is a real-time pricing model for health services where fees update every 60 seconds. It allows medical providers to list their prices for different procedures as well as available appointment times.

== Business model ==
Unlike discount plans or medical insurance, the patient does not pay any upfront cost to participate. In addition, the healthcare provider is never charged a monthly fee.

== Company history ==
HealthSouk was founded as The Smart Alternative to Dental Insurance and also trademarked as The Smart Dental Insurance Alternative. Both have been actively used by HealthSouk in commerce since its founding in 2011. In 2011, Dr. Neilesh Patel founded Healthsouk in Mountain View, California. He is credited as being the inventor of real-time pricing model of health services. Before starting HealthSouk, Dr. Patel founded Healthcare Volunteer. The first market for HealthSouk was Las Vegas, followed by Los Angeles, Orange County, and the San Francisco Bay Area. Patel started HealthSouk after seeing Las Vegas patients struggle to access basic and cosmetic dental care during the aftermath of the U.S. housing crisis and stock market crash. The name HealthSouk was named when Patel was visiting the souks (or marketplaces) of Morocco.
