= 2004 Norwich City Council election =

2004 city council election for Norwich, England

← 2003	10 June 2004	2006 →

All 39 seats to Norwich City Council 20 seats needed for a majority
	First party	Second party
Party	Liberal Democrats	Labour
Seats before	30	14
Seats won	18	15
Seat change	▼12	▲1
Popular vote	12,023	10,084
Percentage	32.4%	27.1%
	Third party	Fourth party
Party	Green	Conservative
Seats before	2	1
Seats won	5	1
Seat change	▲3	Steady
Popular vote	6,438	6,612
Percentage	17.3%	17.8%
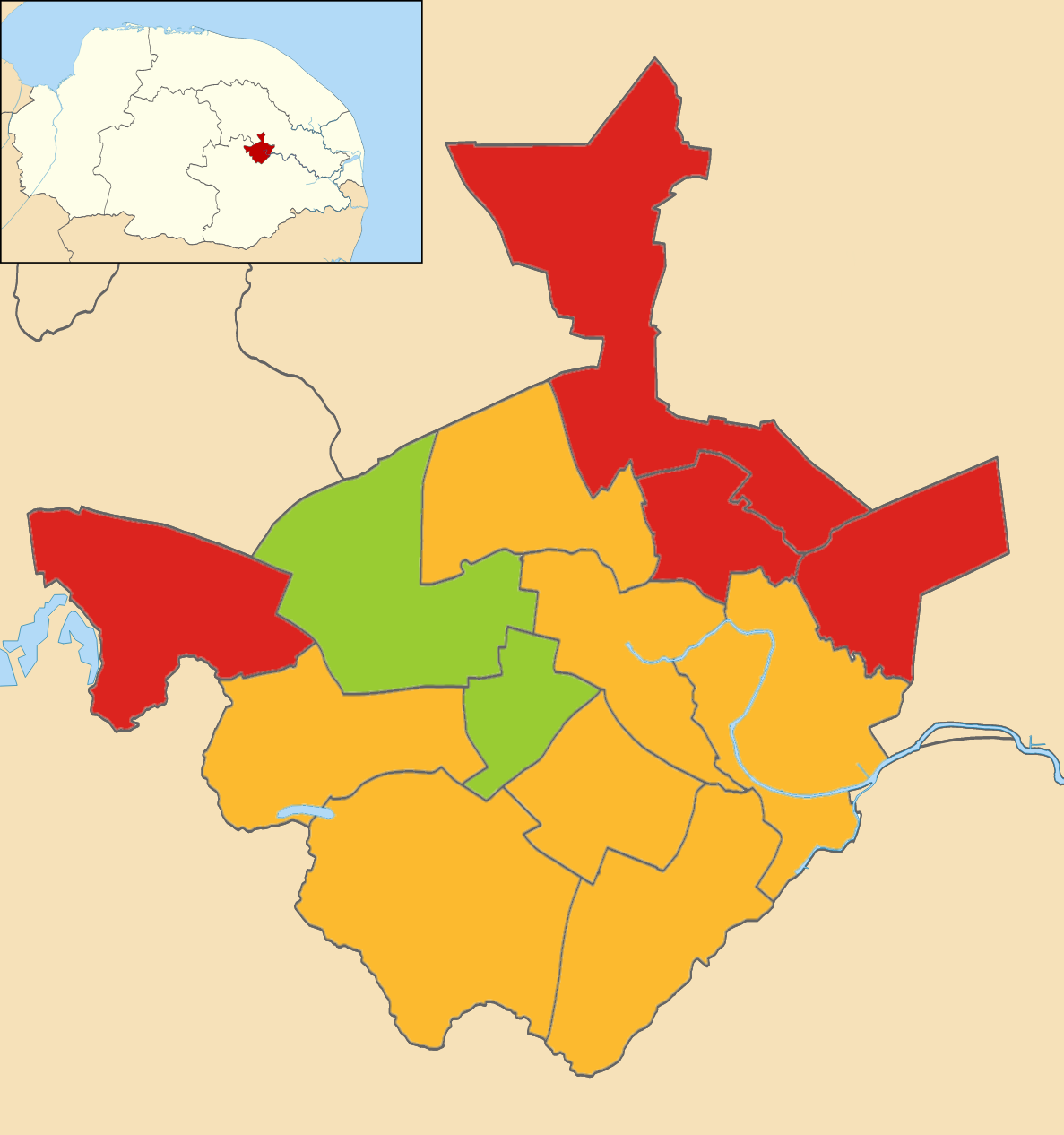
- Map showing the 2004 local election results in Norwich.
Council control before election
Liberal Democrats
Council control after election
No Overall Control

The 2004 Norwich City Council election took place on 10 June 2004 to elect members of Norwich City Council in England. This was on the same day as other local elections. This was the first election to be held under new ward boundaries, which reduced the number of seats from 48 to 39. As a result, all seats were up for election. The Liberal Democrats lost overall control of the council, which fell under no overall control.

== Results summary ==
2004 Norwich City Council election
Party	This election			Full council			This election		
Party	Seats	Net	Seats %	Other	Total	Total %	Votes	Votes %	+/−
Liberal Democrats	18	▼12	46.2	0	18	46.2	33,459	33.2	-5.8
Labour	15	▲1	38.5	0	15	38.5	28,282	28.1	-4.0
Green	5	▲3	12.8	0	5	12.8	17,558	17.4	+1.5
Conservative	1	Steady	2.6	0	1	2.6	18,422	18.3	+5.6
NOTW	0	Steady	0.0	0	0	0.0	1,484	1.5	N/A
Legalise Cannabis	0	Steady	0.0	0	0	0.0	1,283	1.3	N/A
Independent	0	Steady	0.0	0	0	0.0	143	0.1	-1.3

== Ward results ==
=== Bowthorpe ===
Bowthorpe
Party	Candidate	Votes	%	±%
Labour	Brenda Ferris	1,473	37.5	−6.1
Labour	Christine Rumsby	1,441		
Labour	Ronald Borrett	1,400		
Conservative	Antony Little	1,386	35.3	+11.5
Conservative	Louise Little	1,278		
Conservative	Roger Wills	1,228		
Liberal Democrats	Helen Arundell	598	15.2	−9.2
Liberal Democrats	Andrew Higson	552		
Liberal Democrats	Graham Hopkins	518		
Green	Beth Brockett	397	10.1	+1.9
Green	Robin Chittenden	332		
Green	Andrew Knighton	318		
Legalise Cannabis	Mark Palmer	70	1.8	N/A
Turnout			49.0	+19.9
Labour hold				
Labour hold				
Labour hold				

=== Catton Grove ===
Catton Grove
Party	Candidate	Votes	%	±%
Labour	Julie Westmacott	713	31.7	−6.6
Conservative	Evelyn Collishaw	682	30.3	+0.4
Labour	Brian Morrey	680		
Conservative	Colin Barker	670		
Labour	Bernard Smith	646		
Conservative	Trevor Ivory	602		
Liberal Democrats	Roberic Beale	429	19.0	−1.5
Liberal Democrats	Patricia Meacock	400		
Liberal Democrats	Alan Strong	362		
Green	Janet Bearman	330	14.7	+3.4
Green	Wayne McCarthy	233		
Green	Christopher Eley	206		
Legalise Cannabis	Jack Girling	98	4.4	N/A
Turnout			27.0	−1.9
Labour hold				
Conservative gain from Labour				
Labour hold				

=== Crome ===
Crome
Party	Candidate	Votes	%	±%
Labour	David Bradford	1,025	41.7	−9.0
Labour	Alan Waters	927		
Labour	Jennifer Lay	825		
Conservative	John Fisher	567	23.0	−0.4
Liberal Democrats	Malcolm Comer	505	20.5	−0.2
Liberal Democrats	Esther Harris	480		
Conservative	Angus Mackay	479		
Liberal Democrats	Roger Smith	475		
Conservative	Edwin Williams	465		
Green	Beverley Jenkins	284	11.5	+6.3
Green	Fiona Dowson	241		
Green	Ronald Luton-Brown	208		
Legalise Cannabis	Paul Fowler	79	3.2	N/A
Turnout			30.0	−5.8
Labour hold				
Labour hold				
Labour gain from Conservative				

=== Eaton ===
Eaton
Party	Candidate	Votes	%	±%
Liberal Democrats	Judith Lubbock	2,073	53.4	−9.5
Liberal Democrats	Ian Couzens	2,013		
Liberal Democrats	Brian Watkins	1,843		
Conservative	Ian Mackie	1,035	26.7	+4.0
Conservative	Judith Virgo	1,032		
Conservative	Bernard Wells	909		
Labour	Ronald Round	412	10.6	+0.8
Labour	Josephine Smith	386		
Labour	Nicholas Waters	369		
Green	John Peacock	292	7.5	+2.9
Green	Neville Bartlett	288		
Green	Christine Schwabe	254		
Legalise Cannabis	Sally Mittuch	69	1.8	N/A
Turnout			51.0	−4.2
Liberal Democrats hold				
Liberal Democrats hold				
Liberal Democrats hold				

=== Lakenham ===
Lakenham
Party	Candidate	Votes	%	±%
Liberal Democrats	Hereward Cooke	1,074	39.7	−8.5
Labour	Keith Driver	1,014	37.5	+3.8
Liberal Democrats	Colin Harper	983		
Labour	Mary Cannell	969		
Liberal Democrats	Linda Harper	965		
Labour	Charles Sanderson	879		
Conservative	Thomas Holland	300	11.1	−0.4
Conservative	Leslie Richards	289		
Conservative	Eileen Wyatt	277		
Green	Stephen Little	236	8.7	+2.1
Green	Karen Groom	228		
Green	Lester Peters	221		
Legalise Cannabis	John Wakelin	83	3.1	N/A
Turnout			34.0	−2.4
Liberal Democrats hold				
Labour gain from Liberal Democrats				
Liberal Democrats hold				

=== Mancroft ===
Mancroft
Party	Candidate	Votes	%	±%
Liberal Democrats	Diane Lowe	837	34.6	−5.9
Liberal Democrats	Dawn Castle-Green	829		
Liberal Democrats	Nasar Ali	767		
Labour	Daniel Douglas	680	28.1	−5.6
Labour	Penelope Ross	663		
Labour	Christopher Jones	643		
Green	Andrew Boswell	467	19.3	+8.3
Green	Neil Davey	385		
Conservative	Nathan Bennett	310	12.8	−2.0
Conservative	Nicholas Stimpson	278		
Green	Gesine Oppitz-Trotman	274		
Legalise Cannabis	Michael Pryce	123	5.1	N/A
Conservative	Richard Wells	68		
Turnout			29.0	−9.3
Liberal Democrats hold				
Liberal Democrats hold				
Liberal Democrats hold				

=== Mile Cross ===
Mile Cross
Party	Candidate	Votes	%	±%
Liberal Democrats	Victor Elvin	936	38.4	−11.1
Labour	Stephen Morphew	897	36.8	−7.1
Labour	Linda Blakeway	862		
Labour	Robin Taylor	785		
Liberal Democrats	Jack Barton	656		
Liberal Democrats	Simon Richardson	642		
Conservative	David Mackie	250	10.2	N/A
Green	Jennifer Parkhouse	249	10.2	+3.8
Conservative	Clive Smith	236		
Conservative	Joanne Williams	205		
Green	Sean Creaser	190		
Green	George Oppitz-Trotman	159		
Legalise Cannabis	Patrick Cadman	108	4.4	N/A
Turnout			28.0	−1.9
Liberal Democrats hold				
Labour hold				
Labour hold				

=== Nelson ===
Nelson
Party	Candidate	Votes	%	±%
Green	Robert Gledhill	1,691	44.8	+9.2
Green	Adrian Ramsay	1,643		
Green	Jessica Goldfinch	1,624		
Liberal Democrats	Gordon Dean	1,128	29.9	−12.8
Liberal Democrats	April Pond	1,047		
Liberal Democrats	Thomas Wells	823		
Labour	Peter Bartram	416	11.0	−3.7
Labour	Stephen Cook	405		
Labour	Christine Hanny-Saville	366		
Conservative	Lisa Ivory	241	6.4	−0.6
Conservative	Rachel McGurk	232		
Conservative	Victor Hopes	223		
Legalise Cannabis	Derek Williams	158	4.2	N/A
Independent	Steven Land	143	3.8	N/A
Turnout			46.0	+3.6
Green gain from Liberal Democrats				
Green gain from Liberal Democrats				
Green gain from Liberal Democrats				

=== Sewell ===
NOTW = Norwich Over The Water

Sewell
Party	Candidate	Votes	%
Labour	Michael Banham	748	30.1
Labour	Julie Brociek-Coulton	693	
Labour	Nicholas Williams	639	
NOTW	Paul Scruton	561	22.6
NOTW	David Bethell	499	
NOTW	Christopher Simmons	424	
Liberal Democrats	Billy Boulton	405	16.3
Liberal Democrats	Alisdair Gordon	369	
Liberal Democrats	Paul Kendrick	366	
Conservative	Jeremy Carver	350	14.1
Conservative	Ernest Horth	332	
Green	Kevin Boynton	328	13.2
Green	Richard Edwards	313	
Conservative	Diane Roberts	294	
Green	Colin Hynson	278	
Legalise Cannabis	Trevor Smith	94	3.8
Turnout			30.0
Labour win (new seat)			
Labour win (new seat)			
Labour win (new seat)			

=== Thorpe Hamlet ===
Thorpe Hamlet
Party	Candidate	Votes	%	±%
Liberal Democrats	Jill Surridge	983	40.5	−16.8
Liberal Democrats	Samantha Allison	967		
Liberal Democrats	Joyce Divers	963		
Labour	Thomas Gordon	500	20.6	+0.7
Labour	Amanda Sheridan	439		
Conservative	Christopher Coupland	435	17.9	+5.8
Conservative	Barbara Kettel	422		
Labour	John Sheridan	398		
Green	Penelope Lawrence	395	16.3	+5.6
Conservative	Mary Le Winton	385		
Green	Andrew Pearmain	339		
Green	Trevor Luton-Brown	321		
Legalise Cannabis	Farooque Ahmed	115	4.7	N/A
Turnout			30.0	−0.7
Liberal Democrats hold				
Liberal Democrats hold				
Liberal Democrats hold				

=== Town Close ===
Town Close
Party	Candidate	Votes	%	±%
Liberal Democrats	Felicity Hartley	1,340	41.1	−6.2
Liberal Democrats	Adrian Thomas	1,180		
Liberal Democrats	Derek Wood	1,058		
Green	Christopher Webb	634	19.4	+10.3
Labour	Patricia Garner	631	19.3	−13.2
Conservative	Christine Munroe	571	17.5	+6.5
Labour	Roderick Quinn	564		
Conservative	Thomas Jarrett	561		
Labour	Paula Skelton	519		
Conservative	John Wyatt	516		
Green	Anna Orridge	492		
Green	Peter Anderson	464		
Legalise Cannabis	John Paston	87	2.7	N/A
Turnout			36.0	−5.0
Liberal Democrats hold				
Liberal Democrats hold				
Liberal Democrats hold				

=== University ===
University
Party	Candidate	Votes	%	±%
Liberal Democrats	Diane Hume	915	37.2	
Labour	Roy Blower	912	37.1	
Liberal Democrats	Jane Rooza	877		
Liberal Democrats	Ian Williams	834		
Labour	Bert Bremner	822		
Labour	Carol Morrey	685		
Green	Rhys Howell	302	12.3	
Green	Katharine Willett	275		
Green	Ritva Ryynanen	260		
Conservative	Simon Down	224	9.1	
Conservative	Christine Page	222		
Conservative	Dipesh Palana	179		
Legalise Cannabis	Alun Buffry	107	4.3	
Turnout			32.0	
Liberal Democrats hold				
Labour gain from Liberal Democrats				
Liberal Democrats hold				

=== Wensum ===
Wensum
Party	Candidate	Votes	%
Green	Adrian Holmes	833	31.4
Green	Rupert Read	803	
Liberal Democrats	Andrew Aalders-Dunthorne	800	30.2
Green	Tom Llewellyn	771	
Liberal Democrats	Phillip Bazley	765	
Liberal Democrats	Anne Stairs	702	
Labour	Benjamin Hathway	663	25.0
Labour	Freda Sheehy	612	
Labour	Peter Medhurst	581	
Conservative	Christine Mackie	261	9.9
Conservative	Christopher Taylor	216	
Conservative	Philip Saunders	212	
Legalise Cannabis	Richard Lehmann	92	3.5
Turnout			33.0
Green win (new seat)			
Green win (new seat)			
Liberal Democrats win (new seat)			
