= Adrian Ramsay =

British politician (born 1981)

Adrian Ramsay MP
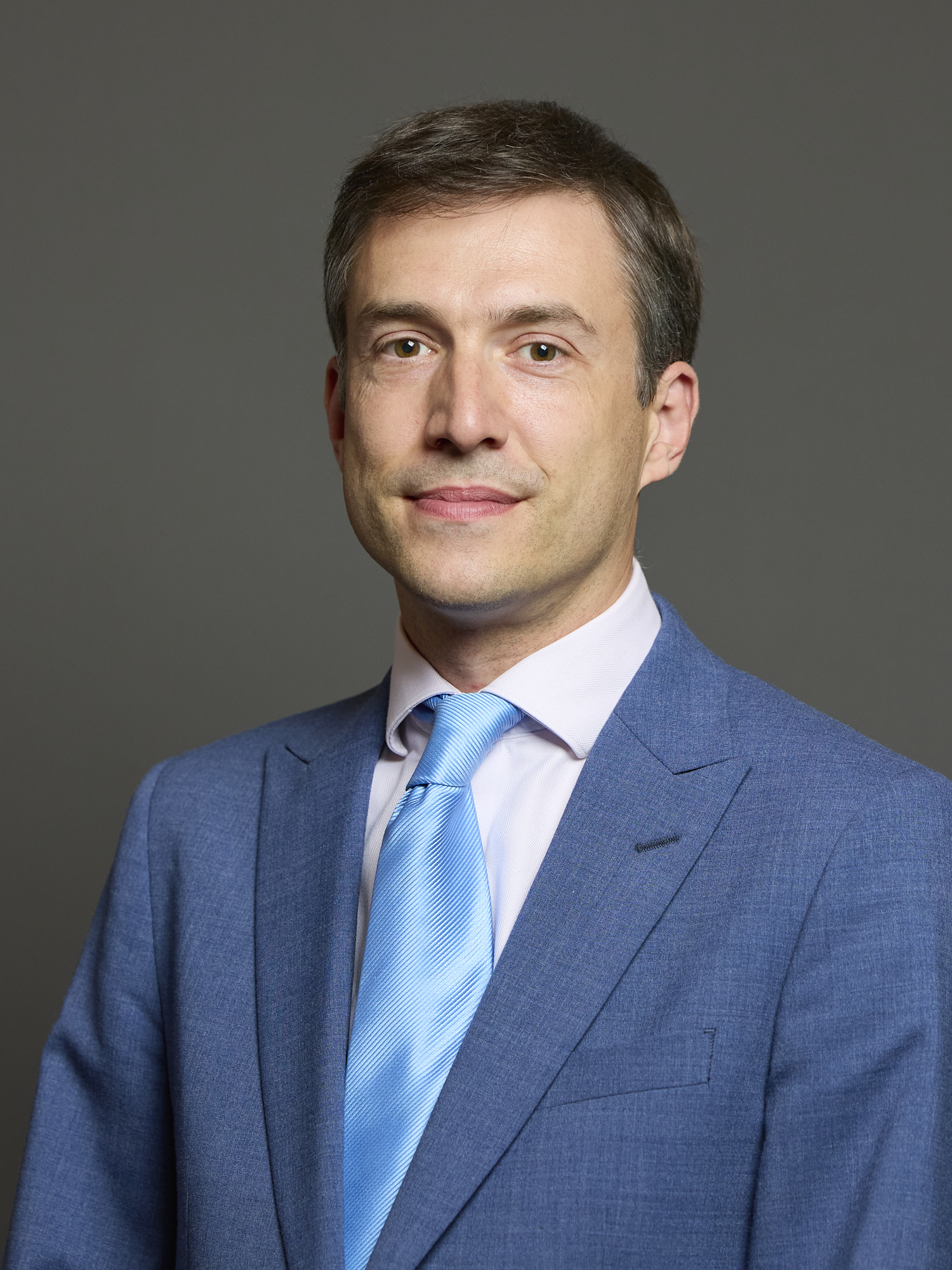
- Official portrait, 2024

Co-leader of the Green Party of England and Wales
- In office 1 October 2021 – 2 September 2025 Serving with Carla Denyer
- Deputy: Amelia Womack; Zack Polanski
- Preceded by: Siân Berry
- Succeeded by: Zack Polanski

Deputy Leader of the Green Party of England and Wales
- In office 5 September 2008 – 3 September 2012
- Leader: Caroline Lucas
- Preceded by: Office established
- Succeeded by: Will Duckworth

Member of Parliament for Waveney Valley
- Incumbent
- Assumed office 4 July 2024
- Preceded by: Constituency established
- Majority: 5,593 (11.4%)

Member of Norwich City Council
- In office 1 May 2003 – 5 May 2011
- Succeeded by: Denise Carlo
- Constituency: Henderson Ward (2003–2004); Nelson Ward (2004–2011)

Personal details
- Born: Adrian Philip Ramsay; August 1981 (age 45) Norwich, Norfolk, England
- Party: Green Party of England and Wales
- Children: 2
- Education: University of East Anglia (BA, MA)
- Website: adrianramsay.org.uk

Adrian Philip Ramsay (born 1981) is a British politician who has served as the Member of Parliament for Waveney Valley since 2024. He was a co-leader of the Green Party of England and Wales from 1 October 2021 to 2 September 2025. He was previously the deputy leader of the Green Party of England and Wales from 2008 to 2012. He served as a Norwich City councillor from 2003 to 2011. He was chief executive of the Centre for Alternative Technology from 2014 to 2019, and from 2019 to 2024 was CEO of MCS Charitable Foundation.

Ramsay was the successful Green parliamentary candidate for Waveney Valley at the 2024 general election and became the first Green MP for a seat in the East of England. This marked the first time that both Green Party co-leaders were elected to Parliament, and he also became the first ever male MP for a Green party in the United Kingdom.

In 2025, Adrian Ramsay stood for re-election as the Co-leader of the Green Party along with Ellie Chowns, but they lost to Zack Polanski.

== Early life and education ==
Ramsay was born and brought up in Norwich. He was educated at City of Norwich School, graduated from the University of East Anglia with a first class degree in politics and sociology in 2002, and went on to study for a master's degree in politics.

== Early political career ==
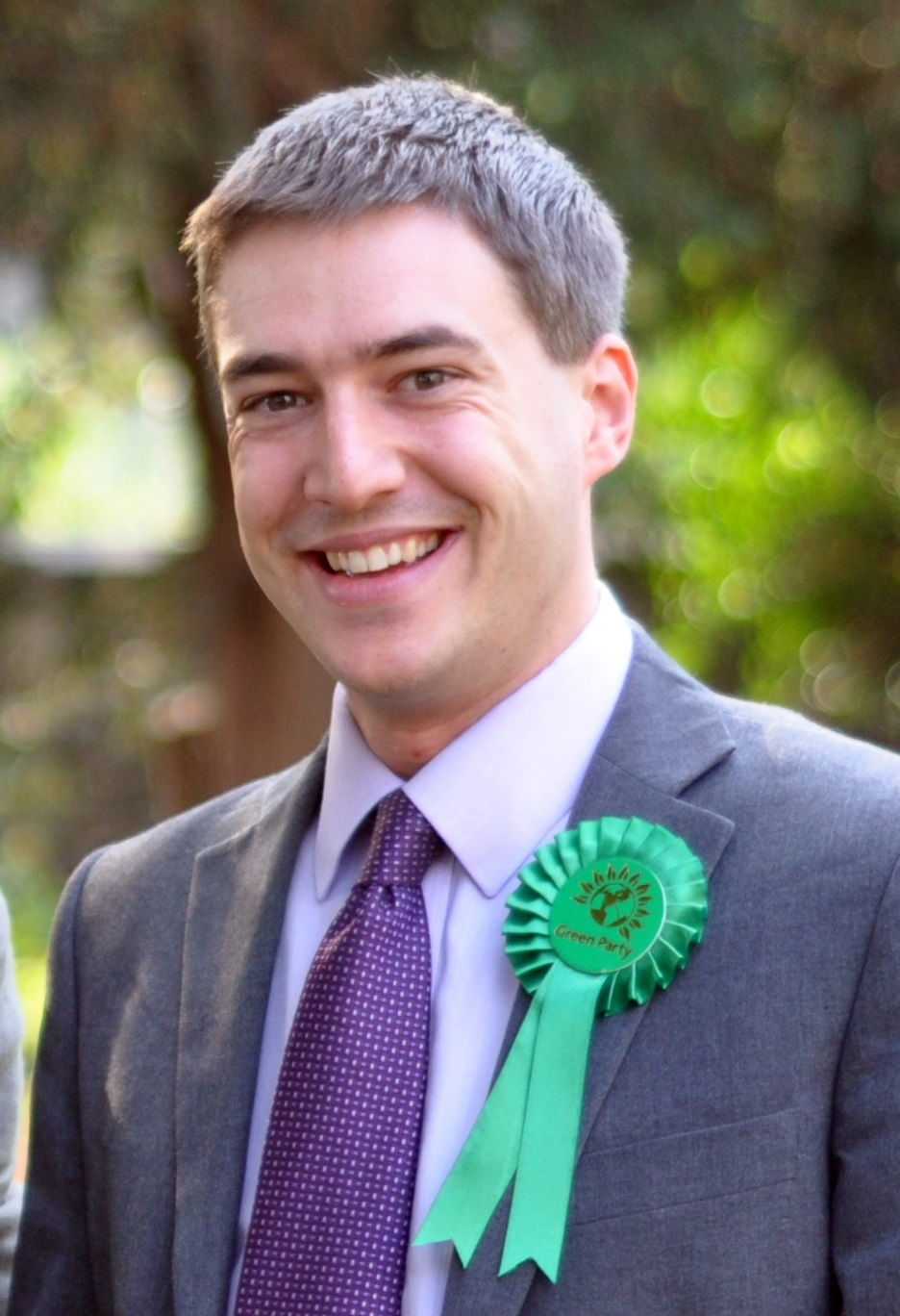
Ramsay in 2010

Ramsay joined the Green Party at the age of 16 in 1998, choosing it as the only party concerned with environmental issues and animal cruelty. He was first elected to Norwich City Council representing Henderson ward in May 2003, representing the Green Party. Aged 21, he was one of the youngest councillors in the UK. Later that year, he spoke at a demonstration against tuition fees in the UK. Ramsay was re-elected in June 2004 for Nelson ward.

In a BBC article from May 2006, Ramsay was described as "pursuing a full-time career through his council work on a £9,500 annual allowance". In 2007, he was elected for a third time. In 2010, he was serving as the leader of the opposition to the Labour council. At the 2011 local elections, he did not seek re-election to Norwich City Council.

Ramsay stood as parliamentary candidate in the Norwich South constituency in the 2005 general election. He came fourth, with 7.4% of the vote (3,101 votes). He stood for Norwich South again in the 2010 general election; the party's leader, Caroline Lucas, cited him as one of the Green candidates with the greatest chance of winning. Ramsay came in fourth place with 14.9% of the vote (7,095 votes). He co-organised Lucas's campaign in Brighton Pavilion which saw her elected as the UK's first Green MP.

Ramsay was elected unopposed as the first Deputy Leader of the Green Party of England and Wales on 5 September 2008. In 2009 he made a speech at the party's conference calling for the end of private finance initiative agreements in the NHS. He was re-elected as Deputy Leader in the 2010 leadership election with 73.4% of the vote. He was speculated as a possible successor to the party's first leader, Caroline Lucas, but did not stand in the 2012 leadership election nor seek re-election as deputy leader.

== Career outside politics ==
Ramsay was chief executive of the Centre for Alternative Technology from 2014 to 2019, working in Powys, Wales. He returned to Norfolk in 2019 and took up the post of chief executive of the MCS Charitable Foundation, a charity working towards carbon-free UK homes, from which he resigned on election to Parliament in July 2024.

== Return to politics ==
On 16 August 2021, Ramsay announced his candidacy for co-leader of the Green Party alongside the Bristol councillor Carla Denyer. He said that the IPCC Sixth Assessment Report had motivated him to return to politics. The pair's joint candidacy emphasised professionalising the party and winning a second Green MP and a first Green Member of the Senedd (MS). The announcement that the pair had been elected was made on 1 October 2021.

In 2023, he defended local Green Party politicians who block solar farms, saying that while the Green Party sees "an important role for solar farms as part of the mix", solar application has to be "considered on [their] merits".

== Parliamentary career ==
At the 2024 general election, Ramsay was elected MP for Waveney Valley with 20,467 votes (41.7%) and a majority of 5,593 over the second-placed Conservative candidate. There were six candidates and a 69% turnout. He became the first Green MP for a seat in the East of England. This marked the first time that both Green Party co-leaders were elected to Parliament. He became the first ever male MP for a Green party in the UK. He was also one of the first five Green Party MPs overall: Lucas retired after fourteen years as an MP, with successful Green candidates Siân Berry, Ellie Chowns, and Ramsay's co-leader Carla Denyer joining him as first-time MPs. Nationally, Labour formed a majority government with Keir Starmer taking office as Prime Minister.

Shortly after assuming office, Ramsay voiced opposition to plans by the new government to build a 100-mile corridor of pylons to connect his Suffolk constituency to offshore wind power. Ramsay said he was in favour of considering other options, including an offshore grid. This led to allegations of NIMBYism, including from the Secretary of State for Energy Security and Net Zero, Ed Miliband. Responding to the allegations in an interview on LBC, Ramsay claimed he was representing concerns of his constituents.

Since 4 July 2024, Ramsay has served as the Green Party's spokesperson for health, dentistry, and environment, food and rural affairs in the House of Commons. He has also been a member of the Environmental Audit Committee since 8 June 2026. On 21 October 2024, Ramsay introduced the Nature-based Solutions (Water and Flooding) Bill, a private member's bill that would require water companies and relevant public bodies to use nature-based solutions to improve water and flood risk management.

Following the Supreme Court ruling on For Women Scotland Ltd v The Scottish Ministers, Ramsay said he supported the ruling. Asked if he believed trans women are women, he did not explicitly agree or disagree. He also said that he believed members of the Green Party should not be expelled from the party for anti-trans views. In response to this, the Young Greens published a statement with their disappointment in Ramsay's comments.

On 8 May 2025, Greens co-leader Carla Denyer announced she would not seek re-election in the 2025 party leadership election so as to focus on her work as an MP. This meant that Ramsay would either have to seek another co-candidate, or stand as a single lone candidate. Three days later, he launched a joint leadership bid alongside fellow Green Party MP Ellie Chowns. The results of the leadership were announced on 2 September 2025, with Chowns and Ramsay being defeated by Zack Polanski, who won with over 84% of the vote.

Ramsay voted against the proscription of Palestine Action. He called for the postponement of the 2026 Norfolk Police and Crime Commissioner by-election.

== Elections contested ==
=== European Parliament ===
Date	Constituency	List position	List votes	% votes
2004	East of England	2nd	84,068	5.6

=== House of Commons ===
Date	Constituency	Votes	% votes	Place
2005	Norwich South	3,101	7.4	4th
2010	Norwich South	7,095	14.9	4th
2024	Waveney Valley	20,467	41.7	Elected

=== Norwich City Council ===
Date	Council	Ward	Votes	Place
2003	Norwich City Council	Henderson	991	Elected
2004	Norwich City Council	Nelson	1,643	Elected
2007	Norwich City Council	Nelson	1,899	Elected

=== Co-Leader of the Green Party ===
Date	Votes	% votes	Place
2021	6,274 (second round)	61.7 (second round)	Elected (on a joint ticket with Carla Denyer)
2025	3,705	15.4	2nd (on a joint ticket with Ellie Chowns)

=== Deputy Leader of the Green Party ===
Date	Votes	% votes	Place
2008	Elected unopposed		
2010	2,386	73.4	Elected

Party political offices
Preceded by Siân Berry; Jonathan Bartley	Leader of the Green Party of England and Wales; 2021–2025; With: Carla Denyer	Succeeded by Zack Polanski
New post	Deputy Leader of the Green Party of England and Wales; 2008–2012	Succeeded by Will Duckworth
Parliament of the United Kingdom
New constituency	Member of Parliament for Waveney Valley; 2024–present	Incumbent
