= Neilesh Patel =

- Born: Boston, Massachusetts, U.S.
- Education: Johns Hopkins University University of California Los Angeles
- Occupations: American humanitarian and social entrepreneur

Neilesh Patel is a social entrepreneur and American humanitarian who serves as Founder and CEO of HealthCare Volunteer, an online global health non-profit organization, and Healthsouk, a dental insurance alternative with no monthly fee. Patel won the 2013 Jefferson Awards for Public Service for Greatest Public Service by an Individual Under Age 35 in June 2013 for his service in facilitating healthcare to over 1 million people worldwide. The Jefferson Award's previous winners include Steve Jobs, Bobby Jindal, Peyton Manning and Lance Armstrong. He is also credited with starting Healthsouk, America's first free dental plan and is credited with being the inventor of real-time pricing for health services. He launched it in 2011 in response to the lack to dental coverage provided in the Affordable Care Act. Other companies were forced to follow suit on creating a free dental plan after HealthSouk started to disrupt the dental discount plan subscription model.

== Early life ==
He graduated with a degree in Biomedical Engineering from the Johns Hopkins University, and a Doctorate in Dental Surgery from UCLA School of Dentistry. Neilesh spent two summers working at Netscape, focusing on Y2K date change development. For his hard work and determination, he was bestowed with a Netscape jacket.

== Work ==
Before working on HealthCare Volunteer, Patel worked on other social enterprises such as StudentsHelp.org Consulting starting at age 17. Patel was awarded the 2013 National Jefferson Award for Greatest Public Service by a Citizen Under Age 35 Patel was awarded the UCLA CEY Humanitarian Award in 2008 and an honorary certificate in Global Health from UCLA School of Public Health for his work in global health volunteering. Patel was also awarded as a 2007 International Youth Foundation Global Laureate YouthActionNet Fellow and a semi-finalist in the Echoing Green Competition.

== Politics ==
Neilesh Patel holds multiple government appointments an including a previous stint as the Public Services Representative on the Children's Policy Council for the State of Texas, Public health consultant for the FDA Dental Devices Panel and Dental Consultant for the Tulare County Office of Education Early Childhood Program.
