= Dentistry in the United Kingdom =

Dentists in the UK may undertake work under the National Health Service or privately. They may opt for either of these alternatives, or both. A small number of dentists are employed by the NHS but the vast majority are in private practice. UK dentists are regulated by the General Dental Council and the Care Quality Commission.

== Payment systems ==
Dentists who work for the NHS are paid by Units of Dentistry Activity, which are bands of treatment. This system was established in England and Wales in 2006. Before that payment was for activity, which encouraged treatment but did not incentivise preventative work.

=== Dental costs ===
Dental costs in the United Kingdom vary depending on whether treatment is provided privately or under the National Health Service (NHS). NHS dental charges in England are divided into three bands, ranging from basic examinations to complex procedures. Private fees are not regulated and can differ considerably between regions and practices. Independent price comparisons suggest that private check-ups typically cost between £40 and £80, while treatments such as fillings and crowns may range from £90 to over £500.

=== England ===
NHS England began procurement for 363 orthodontics contracts in 2017. In December 2019 the British Dental Association and the Association of Dental Groups asked for the contracting process to be stopped. Some had already been abandoned.

=== Wales ===
The Welsh Government launched the Designed to Smile scheme in 2009. This is a preventative programme where new parents are provided with toothpaste and toothbrushes and encouraged to take their child for a dental appointment before their first birthday. Older children are encouraged to brush their teeth in school and free fluoride varnish treatment is made available.

The Welsh National Assembly’s Health, Social Care and Sport Committee published an inquiry into the system (which is not identical to the systems in the rest of the UK) in May 2019. They felt that there was a disincentive for dentists to take on patients who need extensive dental treatment.

=== Education and registration ===
In the United Kingdom, dentists complete 5 years of undergraduate study to earn a B.D.S. or BChD degree. After graduating most dentists will enter a V.T. (vocational training) scheme, of either 1 or 2 years length, to receive their full National Health Service registration. Dentists must register with the G.D.C. (General Dental Council), and meet their requirements as the governing body of the profession, before being allowed to practise. The Dentists Act 1957 defines dentistry with the intention of confining the practice of dentistry to those on the Dental Register. It provided the following definition: "For the purposes of this Act, the practice of dentistry shall be deemed to include the performance of any such operation and the giving of any such treatment, advice or attendance as is usually performed or given by dentists."

There are sixteen dental schools in the UK, five of which are graduate entry programmes, only admitting applicants with at least an upper 2.1 in a classified undergraduate degree with a significant component of biomedical sciences. Thus the competition for places is fierce (approximately 1 successful candidate was admitted in every 26 applicants in 2013). Because of the low number of dental schools, funding for building and service developments in the schools can be very high. Well-known UK universities providing dental courses are the Universities of Leeds, Liverpool, Glasgow, Cardiff, Queen's Belfast, Birmingham, Bristol, Dundee, Manchester, Plymouth, Sheffield, Queen Mary, London and King's College London. As of 2013, the only UK universities offering a 4-year graduate-entry BDS programme are Liverpool, King's College London, BLSMD, UCLan and Aberdeen. There is a shortage of dentists in the UK and over 2 million people cannot get an NHS dentist.

== See also ==
- Dentistry throughout the world
- NHS dentistry
