= 2006 Norwich City Council election =

2006 city council election for Norwich, England

← 2004	3 May 2006	2007 →

13 of 39 seats (One Third) to Norwich City Council 20 seats needed for a majority
	First party	Second party
Party	Labour	Liberal Democrats
Seats before	15	18
Seats won	6	3
Seats after	16	12
Seat change	▲1	▼6
Popular vote	9,331	9,029
Percentage	27.8%	26.9%
	Third party	Fourth party
Party	Green	Conservative
Seats before	5	1
Seats won	5	1
Seats after	9	2
Seat change	▲4	▲1
Popular vote	8,231	6,408
Percentage	24.5%	19.1%
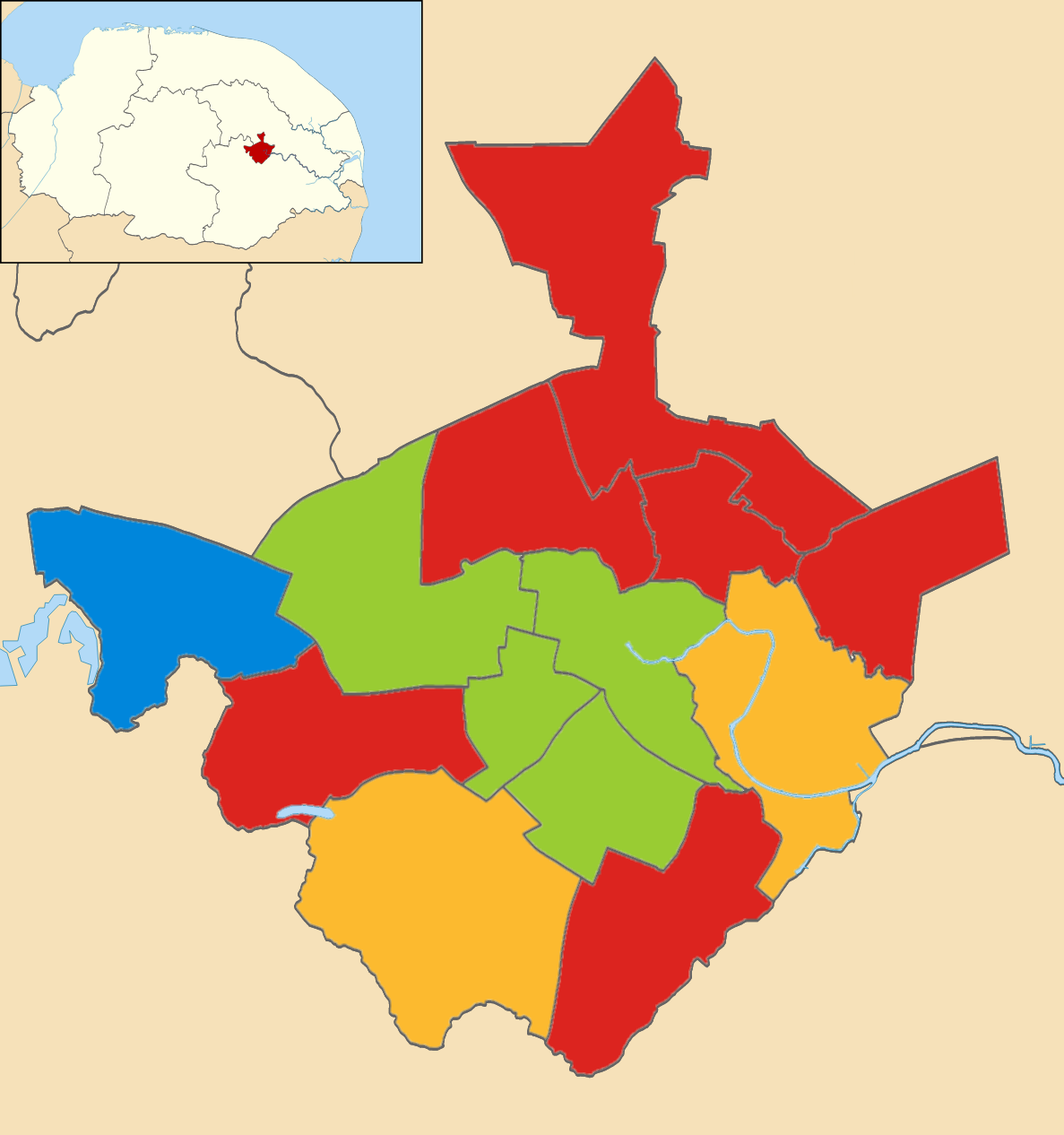
- Map showing the 2006 local election results in Norwich.
Council control before election
No Overall Control
Council control after election
No Overall Control

The 2006 Norwich City Council election took place on 6 May 2006 to elect members of Norwich City Council in England. This was on the same day as other local elections. One third of the council seats were up for election. The council remained under no overall control, with the Labour Party overtaking the Liberal Democrats as the largest party.

== Results summary ==
2006 Norwich City Council election
Party	This election			Full council			This election		
Party	Seats	Net	Seats %	Other	Total	Total %	Votes	Votes %	+/−
Labour	6	▲1	40.0	10	16	41.0	10,523	27.7	-0.4
Liberal Democrats	3	▼6	20.0	9	12	30.8	10,448	27.5	-5.7
Green	5	▲4	33.3	4	9	23.1	9,356	24.6	+7.2
Conservative	1	▲1	6.7	1	2	5.1	7,074	18.6	+0.3
NOTW	0	Steady	0.0	0	0	0.0	463	1.2	-0.3
UKIP	0	Steady	0.0	0	0	0.0	98	0.3	N/A

== Ward results ==
=== Bowthorpe ===
Bowthorpe
Party	Candidate	Votes	%	±%
Conservative	Antony Little	1,055	41.7	+6.4
Labour	Ronald Borrett	916	36.2	−1.3
Green	Nicholas Bishop	290	11.5	+1.4
Liberal Democrats	Simon Richardson	268	10.6	−4.6
Majority		139	5.5	—
Turnout		2,529	33.0	−16.0
Conservative gain from Labour		Swing	▲3.9	

=== Catton Grove ===
Catton Grove
Party	Candidate	Votes	%	±%
Labour	Brian Morrey	823	38.0	+6.3
Conservative	Ian Mackie	677	31.3	+1.0
Liberal Democrats	Paul Kendrick	357	16.5	−2.5
Green	Fiona Dawson	306	14.1	−0.6
Majority		146	6.7	—
Turnout		2,163	29.4	+2.4
Labour hold		Swing	▲2.7	

=== Crome ===
Crome
Party	Candidate	Votes	%	±%
Labour	Jennifer Lay	1,058	44.9	+3.2
Conservative	John Fisher	645	27.4	+4.4
Liberal Democrats	Esther Harris	357	15.2	−5.3
Green	Christopher Webb	296	12.6	+1.1
Majority		413	17.5	—
Turnout		2,356	32.9	+2.9
Labour hold		Swing	▼0.6	

=== Eaton ===
Eaton
Party	Candidate	Votes	%	±%
Liberal Democrats	Brian Watkins	1,757	47.0	−6.4
Conservative	Victor Hopes	1,138	30.4	+3.7
Labour	Josephine Smith	424	11.3	+0.7
Green	Neville Bartlett	419	11.2	+3.7
Majority		619	16.6	—
Turnout		3,738	52.6	+1.6
Liberal Democrats hold		Swing	▼5.1	

=== Lakenham ===
Lakenham
Party	Candidate	Votes	%	±%
Labour	Mary Cannell	1,015	37.8	+0.3
Liberal Democrats	Brian Clark	1,000	37.2	−2.5
Conservative	Eileen Wyatt	336	12.5	+1.4
Green	Stephen Little	334	12.4	+3.7
Majority		15	0.6	—
Turnout		2,685	38.4	+4.4
Labour gain from Liberal Democrats		Swing	▲1.4	

=== Mancroft ===
Mancroft (2 seats due to by-election)
Party	Candidate	Votes	%	±%
Green	Howard Jago	849	35.1	+15.8
Green	Steven Altman	747		
Labour	David Fullman	687	28.4	+0.3
Labour	Daniel Douglas	686		
Liberal Democrats	April Pond	563	23.3	−11.3
Liberal Democrats	Nesar Ahmed	550		
Conservative	George Richards	321	13.3	+0.5
Conservative	Giovanna Maurizio	294		
Turnout			38.5	+9.5
Green gain from Liberal Democrats				
Green gain from Liberal Democrats				

=== Mile Cross ===
Mile Cross
Party	Candidate	Votes	%	±%
Labour	Linda Blakeway	849	41.7	+4.9
Liberal Democrats	Carl Mayhew	700	34.4	−4.0
Green	Susan Curran	250	12.3	+2.1
Conservative	David Mackie	235	11.6	+1.4
Majority		149	7.3	—
Turnout		2,034	29.4	+1.4
Labour hold		Swing	▲4.5	

=== Nelson ===
Nelson
Party	Candidate	Votes	%	±%
Green	Claire Stephenson	1,805	61.3	+16.5
Liberal Democrats	David Fairbairn	523	17.8	−12.1
Labour	Peter Bartram	353	12.0	+1.0
Conservative	Lisa Ivory	264	9.0	+2.6
Majority		1,282	43.5	—
Turnout		2,945	43.3	−2.7
Green hold		Swing	▲14.3	

=== Sewell ===
NOTW = Norwich Over The Water

Sewell
Party	Candidate	Votes	%	±%
Labour	Susan Sands	674	29.7	−0.4
NOTW	Paul Scruton	463	20.4	−2.2
Liberal Democrats	Simon Nobbs	416	18.3	+2.0
Green	Richard Edwards	401	17.7	+4.5
Conservative	Matthew Brice	317	14.0	−0.1
Majority		211	9.3	—
Turnout		2,271	32.5	+2.5
Labour hold		Swing	▲0.9	

=== Thorpe Hamlet ===
Thorpe Hamlet (2 seats due to by-election)
Party	Candidate	Votes	%	±%
Liberal Democrats	Joyce Divers	1,004	41.0	+0.5
Liberal Democrats	Jeremy Hooke	869		
Labour	Thomas Gordon	542	22.1	+1.5
Labour	Robin Taylor	506		
Green	James Conway	497	20.3	+4.0
Conservative	Trevor Ivory	408	16.6	−1.3
Green	Penelope Lawrence	378		
Conservative	Christine Page	372		
Turnout			33.5	+3.5
Liberal Democrats hold				
Liberal Democrats hold				

=== Town Close ===
Town Close
Party	Candidate	Votes	%	±%
Green	Janet Bearman	1,319	39.8	+20.4
Liberal Democrats	Billy Boulton	923	27.9	−13.2
Conservative	John Wyatt	582	17.6	+0.1
Labour	Paula Skelton	487	14.7	−4.6
Majority		396	11.9	—
Turnout		3,311	42.7	+6.7
Green gain from Liberal Democrats		Swing	▲16.8	

=== University ===
University
Party	Candidate	Votes	%	±%
Labour	James Bremner	893	41.5	+4.4
Liberal Democrats	Jane Rooza	658	30.6	−6.6
Green	Jack Guest	301	14.0	+1.7
Conservative	Rachael Howarth	201	9.3	+0.2
UKIP	Vandra Ahlstrom	98	4.6	N/A
Majority		235	10.9	—
Turnout		2,151	31.1	−0.9
Labour gain from Liberal Democrats		Swing	▲5.5	

=== Wensum ===
Wensum
Party	Candidate	Votes	%	±%
Green	Tom Llewellyn	1,164	46.4	+15.0
Labour	Benjamin Hathway	610	24.3	−0.7
Liberal Democrats	Andrew Aalders-Dunthorne	503	20.1	−10.1
Conservative	Louise Little	229	9.1	−0.8
Majority		554	22.1	—
Turnout		2,505	35.0	+2.0
Green gain from Liberal Democrats		Swing	▲7.9	

== By-elections ==
=== Mile Cross ===
Mile Cross: 27 July 2006
Party	Candidate	Votes	%	±%
Liberal Democrats	Carl Mayhew	789	46.1	+11.7
Labour	Barbara James	702	41.0	−0.7
Green	Susan Curran	115	6.7	−5.6
Conservative	David Mackie	106	6.2	−5.4
Majority		87	5.1	
Turnout		1,712	24.4	
Liberal Democrats hold		Swing	▲6.2	
