= Dental discount plan =

Type of health insurance plan

A dental discount plan, also known as a referral plan, is a membership-based discount plan for dental health maintenance and intervention. In it, the patient pays the entire cost of a rate negotiated between the dentist and the referring company, usually between 10 and 60% of normal cost.

These plans emerged as an alternative to dental insurance in response to the rising healthcare costs and dissatisfaction with the waiting period, yearly caps, and limited reimbursement of standard insurance plans. The typical plan comes without annual limits, and shorter waiting periods to activation. Some plans cover cosmetic dental procedures as well, although this is less common. A standard dental discount plan has a limited roster of dentists within its approved network, similar to dental insurance.

== See also ==
- Dental insurance
- Dentistry
- List of dental organizations
