= 2007 Norwich City Council election =

2007 city council election for Norwich, England

← 2006	3 May 2007	2008 →

13 of 39 seats (One Third) to Norwich City Council 20 seats needed for a majority
	First party	Second party
Party	Labour	Liberal Democrats
Seats before	16	12
Seats won	5	2
Seats after	15	11
Seat change	▼1	▼1
Popular vote	10,309	8,216
Percentage	28.9%	23.1%
	Third party	Fourth party
Party	Green	Conservative
Seats before	9	2
Seats won	4	2
Seats after	10	3
Seat change	▲1	▲1
Popular vote	9,528	7,238
Percentage	26.8%	20.3%
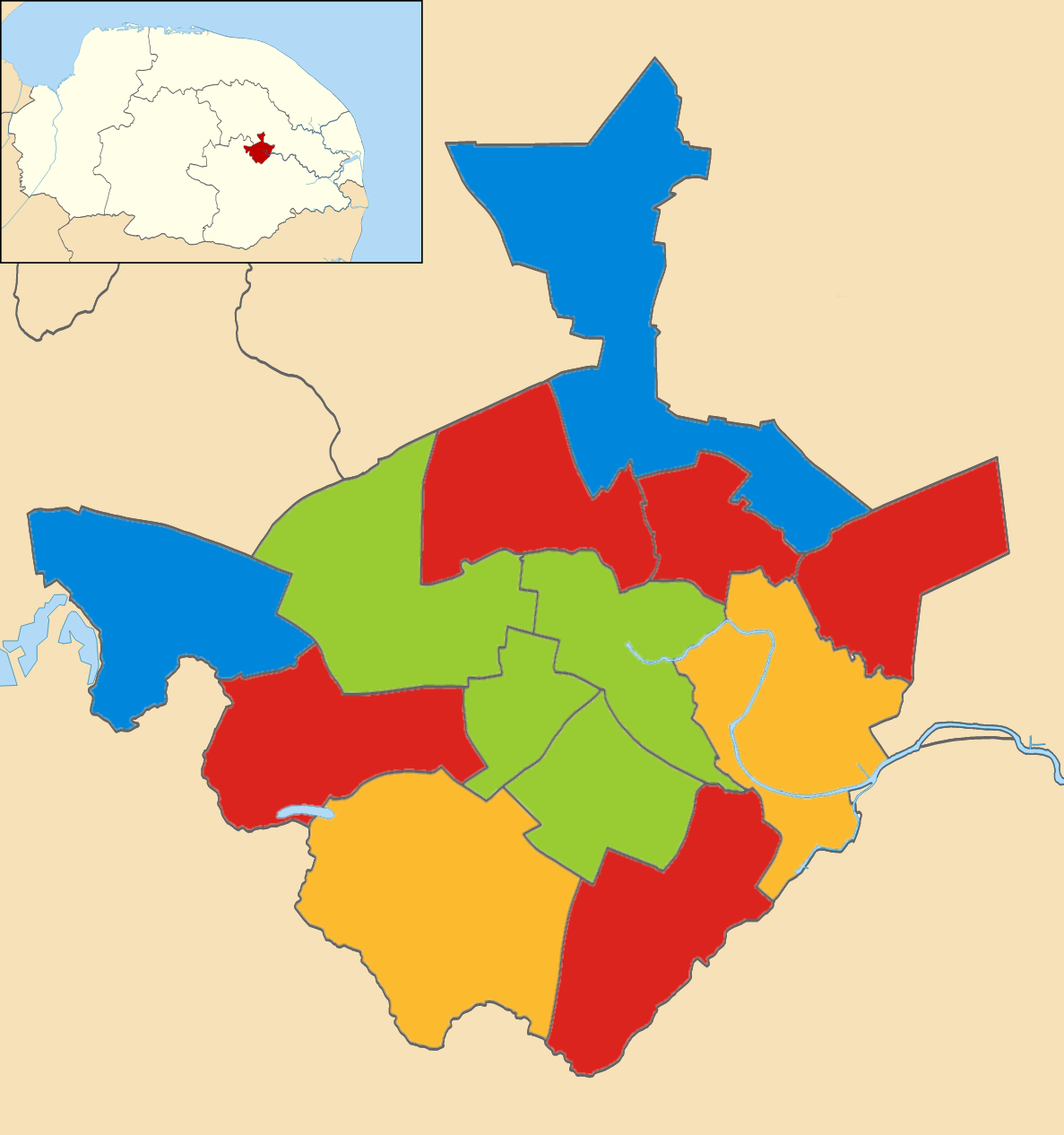
- Map showing the 2007 local election results in Norwich.
Council control before election
No overall control
Council control after election
No overall control

The 2007 Norwich City Council election took place on 3 May 2007 to elect members of Norwich City Council in England. One third of seats (13) were up for election. This was on the same day as other local elections.

== Election result ==
After the election, the new makeup of the City Council was:

- Labour 15 (-1)
- Liberal Democrat 11 (-1)
- Green 10 (+1)
- Conservative 3 (+1)

Norwich Council Election Result 2007
Party	Seats	Gains	Losses	Net gain/loss	Seats %	Votes %	Votes	+/−
Labour	5			–1	38.5	28.9	10,309	
Green	4			+1	30.8	26.8	9,528	
Liberal Democrats	2			–1	15.4	23.1	8,216	
Conservative	2			+1	15.4	20.3	7,238	
UKIP	0			±0	0.0	0.9	327	
Turnout								

== Ward results ==
=== Bowthorpe ===
Bowthorpe
Party	Candidate	Votes	%	±%
Conservative	John Graham Wyatt	975	38.1	−3.6
Labour	Chrissie Rumsby	966	37.7	+1.5
Green	Blair Andrew Campbell	337	13.2	+1.7
Liberal Democrats	Francis John McInvor	282	11.0	+0.4
Majority		9	0.4	−5.1
Turnout		2,560	31.1	−1.9
Conservative gain from Labour		Swing	▼2.6	

=== Catton Grove ===
Catton Grove
Party	Candidate	Votes	%	±%
Conservative	Evelyn Jean Collishaw	1,003	42.0	+10.7
Labour	Martin Alexander Booth	877	36.7	−1.3
Green	Penny Edwards	313	13.1	−1.0
Liberal Democrats	Nesar Ahmed	194	8.1	−8.4
Majority		126	5.3	—
Turnout		2,387	31.3	+1.9
Conservative hold		Swing	▲6.0	

=== Crome ===
Crome
Party	Candidate	Votes	%	±%
Labour	Alan Waters	1,110	44.4	−0.5
Conservative	Kay Frances Mason	684	27.4	±0.0
Liberal Democrats	Irene Patricia Bowling	402	16.1	+0.9
Green	Christopher Webb	303	12.1	−0.5
Majority		426	17.0	−0.5
Turnout		2,499	34.9	+2.0
Labour hold		Swing	▼0.3	

=== Eaton ===
Eaton
Party	Candidate	Votes	%	±%
Liberal Democrats	Rosalind Mary Wright	1,607	40.7	−6.3
Conservative	Vic Hopes	1,303	33.0	+2.6
Labour	Ron Borrett	467	11.8	+0.5
Green	Richard Andrew Bearman	454	11.5	+0.3
UKIP	John Frederick Wilder	117	3.0	N/A
Majority		304	7.7	−8.9
Turnout		3,948	54.8	+2.2
Liberal Democrats hold		Swing	▼4.5	

=== Lakenham ===
Lakenham
Party	Candidate	Votes	%	±%
Labour	Keith Malcom Driver	1,159	39.5	+1.7
Liberal Democrats	Gordon Richard Dean	1,060	36.2	−1.0
Green	Jacqui McCarney	293	10.0	−2.4
Conservative	Carrie Chandler	290	9.9	−2.6
UKIP	Steve Emmens	130	4.4	N/A
Majority		99	3.3	+2.7
Turnout		2,932	40.4	+2.0
Labour hold		Swing	▲1.4	

=== Mancroft ===
Mancroft
Party	Candidate	Votes	%	±%
Green	Tom Dylan	1,027	39.6	+4.5
Labour	David Fullman	687	26.5	−1.9
Liberal Democrats	Alan David Oliver	481	18.5	−4.8
Conservative	Niki William George	398	15.3	+2.0
Majority		340	13.1	—
Turnout		2,593	32.4	−6.1
Green hold		Swing	▲3.2	

=== Mile Cross ===
Mile Cross
Party	Candidate	Votes	%	±%
Labour	Steve Morphew	1,013	43.6	+1.9
Liberal Democrats	Simon Richard Nobbs	707	30.4	−4.0
Conservative	David John Mackie	305	13.1	+1.5
Green	Christine Patricia Way	298	12.8	+0.5
Majority		306	13.2	+4.9
Turnout		2,323	31.6	+2.2
Labour hold		Swing	▲3.0	

=== Nelson ===
Nelson
Party	Candidate	Votes	%	±%
Green	Adrian Philip Ramsay	1,899	61.6	+0.3
Liberal Democrats	David Angus Fairbairn	518	16.8	−1.0
Labour	Peter Bartram	397	12.9	+0.9
Conservative	Malcolm Andrew Chamberlin	271	8.8	−0.2
Majority		1,381	44.8	+1.3
Turnout		3,085	42.0	−1.3
Green hold		Swing	▲0.7	

=== Sewell ===
Sewell
Party	Candidate	Votes	%	±%
Labour	Julie Brociek-Coulton	931	39.0	+9.3
Green	Penny Killingbeck	573	24.0	+6.3
Conservative	Tony William Landamore	453	19.0	+5.0
Liberal Democrats	Ian Robert Williams	428	17.9	−0.4
Majority		358	15.0	+5.7
Turnout		2,385	31.9	−0.6
Labour hold		Swing	▲1.5	

=== Thorpe Hamlet ===
Thorpe Hamlet
Party	Candidate	Votes	%	±%
Liberal Democrats	Jeremy Nigel Hooke	953	34.5	−6.5
Green	James Patrick Conway	952	34.5	+14.2
Conservative	George Richards	429	15.5	−1.1
Labour	John Holdcroft	428	15.5	−6.6
Majority		1	<0.1	—
Turnout		2,762	35.4	+1.9
Liberal Democrats hold		Swing	▼10.4	

=== Town Close ===
Town Close
Party	Candidate	Votes	%	±%
Green	Stephen Ralph Little	1,474	44.3	+4.5
Liberal Democrats	Chris Thomas	734	22.1	−5.8
Conservative	Eileen Olive Wyatt	620	18.6	+1.0
Labour	Bob Sanderson	497	14.9	+0.2
Majority		740	22.2	+10.3
Turnout		3,325	41.1	−1.6
Green gain from Liberal Democrats		Swing	▲5.2	

=== University ===
University
Party	Candidate	Votes	%	±%
Labour	Roy George Blower	1,155	50.2	+8.7
Liberal Democrats	James William Wright	472	20.5	−10.1
Green	Ruth Alexandra Makoff	368	16.0	+2.0
Conservative	Niall Graham Baxter	227	9.9	+0.6
UKIP	Vandra Susan Ahlstrom	80	3.5	−1.1
Majority		683	29.7	+18.8
Turnout		2,302	33.1	+2.0
Labour hold		Swing	▲9.4	

=== Wensum ===
Wensum
Party	Candidate	Votes	%	±%
Green	Rupert Jefferson Read	1,237	49.1	+2.7
Labour	Ben Hathway	622	24.7	+0.4
Liberal Democrats	Brian Ralph Clark	378	15.0	−5.1
Conservative	Paul Anthony George Wells	280	11.1	+2.0
Majority		615	24.4	+2.3
Turnout		2,517	29.8	−5.2
Green hold		Swing	▲1.2	
