= NHS dentistry =

Oral healthcare in the United Kingdom

In the United Kingdom, dentistry that is provided by the four National Health Services of the country, is supposed to ensure that dental treatment is available to the whole population. Most dentistry is provided by private practitioners, most of whom also provide, on a commercial basis, services which the NHS does not provide, largely cosmetic. Most adult patients have to pay some NHS charges, although these are often significantly cheaper than the cost of private dentistry. The majority of people choose NHS dental care rather than private care: as of 2005, the national average proportion of people forced to use private care was 23%. NHS dentistry is not always available and is not managed in the way that other NHS services are managed.

== Scope of the service ==
According to NHS Choices "All the treatment that your dentist believes is necessary to achieve and maintain good oral health is available on the NHS. This means that the NHS provides any treatment you need to keep your mouth, teeth and gums healthy and free of pain". This includes if clinically necessary: dentures, crowns and bridges, orthodontics (under the age of 16/18), root canal treatment, scaling and polishing, white fillings, Emergency Dental Treatments, Children Treatments.

Many dentists who provide NHS services also offer additional services, such as hygienists, for payment. A dentist is not allowed to refuse to provide necessary treatment under the NHS and then offer to perform the same treatment privately.

== Availability ==
NHS dentistry has often struggled to even see 55% of the population in a one-year period.

Following the government's introduction of a new contract in April 2006, NHS dentistry is not as widely available as it once was, with 900,000 fewer patients seeing an NHS dentist in 2008 and 300,000 losing their NHS dentist in a single month. This has forced many patients to pay much higher sums for private treatment, and has been criticised by the British Dental Association as having "failed to improve access to care for patients and failed to allow dentists to provide the modern, preventive care they want to deliver".

Ben Bradshaw, then Minister for Health, was questioned on Radio 4 in 2007 about the shortfall in NHS dentistry leading to patients unable to access NHS dentists and even resorting to pulling their own teeth out. He suggested that those needing urgent treatment should go to see their GP, prompting the British Medical Association to observe that a General Practitioner was no substitute for a qualified dentist.

There are repeated stories of shortage of NHS dental services, especially in remote areas such as Skye and Cornwall. Lack of access to emergency dentistry is often seen as contributing to overcrowding in hospital accident & emergency departments. In May 2007, there was a backlog of 14,000 people unable to register with an NHS dentist in Cornwall. Waiting times for routine appointments were up to eighteen months.

In October 2018 the chairman of general dental practice at the British Dental Association claimed that there was a hostile environment for dental patients. 380,000 patients a year with dental problems were approaching general practitioners, who were not equipped to help. Accessible public-facing information on where to seek care for dental problems was required.

In England in 2019 over 2 million people were missing out on dental treatment. It is estimated that 1.45 million have tried and were unable to get an NHS appointment, others are on waiting lists (0.13 million) or cost discourages them (0.73 million). A further 2 million believe they cannot get a dentist where they live, making it likely that almost one in ten people cannot get a dentist. Dave Cottam of the British Dental Association said there was a, "perfect storm" of failed contracts, recruitment problems and underfunding. Cottam added, "These access problems are no longer affecting a few 'hotspots', but are now the reality for millions across every English region. The public are entitled to access care, but the system is stacked against them. Those losing out are the patients who need us most." The British Dental Association maintains there are serious problems over access to dental treatment in Wales, and similar problems exist on a smaller scale in Northern Ireland and Scotland.

As of April 2026, directory data aggregated by AllDentists across 20,712 UK dental practices showed an overall NHS acceptance rate of 12.4%, with only 2,577 practices accepting new NHS patients. In England, where the data is most complete, 2,563 of 17,484 tracked practices (14.7%) were accepting new NHS patients, with significant variation between cities—ranging from over 30% in Manchester to under 5% in Bristol.

== Charges ==
Initially NHS dentistry was free at the time of use but charges to patients were introduced in 1951 and have been increased, normally every April. Charges vary in different countries of the UK.

As of July 2025 there were three standard charges for all NHS dental treatments in England and Wales:

- Band 1 course of treatment – £27.40 in England, £20 in Wales; covers an examination, diagnosis (including X-rays), advice on how to prevent future problems, a scale and polish if needed, and application of fluoride varnish or fissure sealant. Band 1 also covers emergency care such as stopping bleeding, trauma, teeth knocked out, severe pain or swelling, even if more than one visit is required.
- Band 2 course of treatment – £75.30 in England, £60 in Wales; covers everything listed in Band 1, plus fillings, root canal work or removal of teeth.
- Band 3 course of treatment – £326.70 in England, £260 in Wales; covers everything listed in Bands 1 and 2, plus crowns, dentures and bridges.

=== Exemptions ===
Some groups of people are exempt for charges for dental treatment. The exempted groups in England are:

- children under 18,
- people under 19 and in full-time education,
- people who get certain means-tested benefits, together with their partners, and dependents under 20
- women who are pregnant or have had a baby in the previous 12 months and have a valid maternity exemption certificate (MatEx) when they start a course of treatment
- patients receiving dental treatment in an NHS hospital from a hospital dentist
- people receiving War Pension Scheme payments, or Armed Forces Compensation Scheme payments where the treatment is for the patient's accepted disability
- people in custody
- people who qualify for either a full or partial exemption under the NHS Low Income Scheme:
  - a HC2 full help certificate entitles the holder to free dental and other NHS treatment
  - a HC3 limited help certificate reduces any payment required, without providing a full exemption. A patient is only required to pay three times the amount their income exceeds the free treatment level. All charges paid within a three-week period are added together and count as one charge.

Exemptions in Wales are broadly similar, but with a small number of extra qualifying groups:

- people entitled to, or named on, a valid NHS tax credit exemption certificate
- people who are an NHS Hospital Dental Service out-patient

In addition, the £20 Band 1 charge for a dental examination is waived if a person is aged under 25 or over 59.

==== Exemption administration issues ====
From 2013 to 2015, 632 patients in Oldham who were in receipt of Universal Credit and therefore entitled to free prescriptions were issued with penalty charge notices, totalling £71,000, because the NHS forms had not been updated to reflect the introduction of Universal Credit. Patients with learning difficulties and with dementia have been issued with penalties because they made honest mistakes ticking the wrong box in complex forms. This has caused stress for the patients and extra work for the dentists trying to sort out the problem. 90% of fines are overturned on appeal. People on low incomes are deterred from seeking dental care that they need because they fear being fined. Dental visits by people on low incomes fell 23% during the four years to 2018.

== History ==
School dental services provided by local authorities developed slowly after 1907 when the first service of this kind was set up in Cambridge.

When the NHS was established in July 1948 dental treatment was free. Demand on the service was enormous. About a quarter of the dentists joined the NHS and by November 1948 83% had joined. Dental health in the UK was worse than that of Germany. In the first nine months of the NHS 4.5 million teeth were removed and 4.2 million teeth were filled. In 1950-1951 65.5 million artificial teeth were fitted.

At the inception of the NHS in 1948 there were three branches of dental service, and these 3 branches still exist today, although the organisation of services in England has changed much more than in the rest of the UK:

- A local health authority dental service which provided dental inspection and treatment to school children, pre-school children and to pregnant women and mothers of infants under one year old, but is now chiefly special needs dentistry. These were transferred to the NHS in the 1974 reorganisation. These services employed the whole-time equivalent of about 1,980 dental officers, assisted by 370 dental auxiliaries, 2,900 dental surgery assistants, 70 hygienists and 140 dental technicians in the UK in 1977. They were repeatedly reorganised, like other community services. Most were run by primary care trusts until they were abolished in April 2013.
- A general practitioner service. Proposals for whole-time salaried service at health centres came to nothing and almost all general dental practitioners are in private practice. Contracts were originally held by local executive councils, and then by their successors family practitioner committees, family health services authorities and primary care trusts. They are now held by NHS England
- A hospital dental service, with access to specialist maxillo-facial and oral surgeons. Managed originally by regional health authorities they became part of NHS trusts, mostly in teaching hospitals.

Charges were first introduced in 1951, for dentures and in 1952 for other treatments.

The Royal Commission on the National Health Service in 1979 reported that local authorities had a statutory duty to make comprehensive dental treatment available to pupils since 1953, but understaffing had prevented the school dental service from delivering it. In 1968 37% of the population of England and Wales over the age of 16 had no natural teeth. In Scotland 44% of the population over 15 in 1972 had none.

There were about 14,000 general dental practitioners doing NHS work in the UK in 1977, employing about 20,000 dental surgery assistants, and 1145 dental hygienists. 46% of adults with some of their own teeth in England and Wales regularly attended a dentist in 1978 compared with 40% in 1968. In 1979 there were about 400 dental consultants in hospital services, mostly based in the 17 undergraduate dental hospitals and one post-graduate institute.

In 1948 only 19% of twelve-year-olds had no significant dental decay but in 2003 this had risen to 62%. In 2015 only 6% of the population had no natural teeth.

== Contract ==
Dentists are private contractors to the NHS, which means the dentists buy the building and equip the surgery, hire all the staff and pay all of the running costs including wages, materials and insurances, to provide an NHS dental service.

The contract between the NHS and dentists determines what work is provided for under the NHS, payments to dentists, and charges to patients. The contract is regularly revised. From 1947 dentists were paid for each filling, extraction or other work. In the first two years of the NHS the rates of item of service payments were cut three times. By 2006 there were over 400 items listed. This incentivised fillings and extractions, but not preventative work. In 1990 a new contract introduced capitation payments for treating children up to the age of 16 and registration for adult patients. In 1991-92 the dental budget was overspent by £190 million and the amount paid for each item of treatment was reduced by 7%. This encouraged dentists to move into private work.

The contract introduced in 2006 was said by the British Dental Association in 2016 to be not fit for purpose, rewarding dentists for meeting government targets for treatment and repair, but not for improving patients' oral health. In contrast to general practice, patients in England do not register with a dental practice. Under the 2006 contract they are examined, treated then discharged with a recommendation of when further examination is appropriate. However that is not how patients experience it, nor how practices operate, although it is legally correct. Practices in reality operate a list system and are regularly reported as closed to NHS patients, though open to those who pay privately.

In England providers (the contract holders) are paid in "Units of Dental Activity". Typical values for units are £20-35, and they are paid 1 unit for a band 1 course of treatment, 3 for a band 2 course of treatment, and 12 for a band 3 course of treatment. Patient charges are deducted from these values. The performers (dentists) providing the treatment get a proportion of the payment, usually below 40%, and have to pay laboratory bills such as for the construction of dentures and crowns out of their cut. For many treatments, the rate of pay is below the cost of providing the treatment to a modern standard, and as a result, many dentists will refer patients for complex treatments. In 2008 the Parliamentary Health Select Committee investigation found the UDAs were unfit for purpose.

A revised contract was under discussion in 2013 with greater emphasis on oral health and quality indicators. The British Dental Association is keen to see reform, having campaigned vigorously against the "flawed, target-driven arrangements" introduced in 2006 that are currently in place. In 2022, NHS England proposed a number of changes to the contract to reflect the increasing number of high need patients caused by the COVID-19 pandemic.

In Scotland and Northern Ireland, the system works differently and relies upon a mix of capitation payments alongside Item of Service charges. An examination in Scotland is free of charge to the patient, but pays the dentist £8.10. For most other items of treatment, the patient charge is set at 80% of the total fee. The fees paid are approximately one third to one half of what they were in 1948, once adjusted for inflation.

== Performance ==
In June 2015 The consumer group Which? contacted 500 dental surgeries listed on the official NHS Choices website and found that 31% of them were refusing to take on any new NHS patients. They called for the Competition and Markets Authority to intervene to ensure dentists were complying with rules. The British Dental Health Foundation. HealthWatch England said that in some parts of England only a fifth of surgeries were accepting new NHS patients. The chair of the British Dental Association, said the “byzantine system” had failed dentists and patients.

The BDA said that the 2006 contract did not meet its purpose of improving access to NHS dentistry and concentrating on prevention, and had been criticised by patient groups, government, the Health Select Committee and the Chief Dental Officers for England and Wales.

In January 2016, more than 400 dentists signed a letter arguing that the NHS dental system in England is unfit for purpose and are whistleblowing publicly, to warn and expose the centralised failings to develop a proper national dental health and prevention strategy.

In May 2022 the Association of Dental Groups, a trade association. published a report on the gaps in NHS dental provision (or “dental deserts”) in England. It indicated that the number of dentists conducting NHS work in January 2022 was the lowest for a decade. It highlighted the areas of England with the lowest number of NHS dentists per 100,000 population and expressed the need for a levelling up of access. A lack of access to NHS dentistry presents risks not only for oral health, but also in relation to early detection of mouth cancers and type two diabetes.

In July 2022 the British Dental Association released an article that the proposed changes to the NHS contract would do little to stop the exodus of dentists from providing NHS treatment, due to the high displeasure in the system.

== See also ==
- Special needs dentistry
- Dental discount plan
- Dental insurance
- Dentistry in the United Kingdom
