= HealthCare Volunteer =

HealthCareVolunteer.com
- Founded: December 27, 2005
- Founder: Neilesh Patel DDS and Elliot Mendelsohn MD
- Type: 501(c)(3)
- Purpose: Healthcare
- Region served: GLOBAL
- Members: Over 2+ million people served with 7.2 million volunteer hours
- CEO: Patrick R. Callico
- Key people: Dr. Neilesh Patel (Founder & Board Member); Patrick R. Callico (Chief Executive Officer); Ravi Raghavan (Chief Operating Officer)
- Employees: 58 volunteers/employees
- Volunteers: Over 300,000 website users
- Website: www.healthcarevolunteer.com

HealthCareVolunteer.com is a non-profit organization that connects volunteers with a health-related volunteering opportunity. The organization provides medical, dental, and surgical services to needy patients and impoverished people worldwide, through indirect and direct patient-care programs.

The company also provides a social networking application that allows health volunteers to connect and create new volunteer teams. The organization has matched over 290,000 volunteers to nearly 3,300 organizations worldwide. In total, over 1.5 million patients have received health care as a result of its indirect and direct patient care programs.

== History ==
In 2005, during his first year at UCLA Dental School, Patel decided to travel to Brazil to provide dental services to underserved communities. However, he encountered difficulties in finding volunteer opportunities, having contacted more than 15 Brazilian organizations and receiving no response. He found that other dental and medical students had experienced similar problems. To address this problem, Patel created the Dental Volunteer and later HealthCare Volunteer to help connect students with volunteer opportunities.

During Dental school, Neilesh Patel said he spent many "pizza nights" – subsisting on pizza and pulling all-nighters teaching himself how to program and build a Web site, which became the backbone of HealthCare Volunteer. He said he was driven by the belief that all qualified applicants should have the opportunity to volunteer. Soon, now-orthopedic surgeon Elliot Mendelssohn, also a biomedical engineering major in his undergraduate days, joined Patel to help build HealthCare Volunteer.

Founded by Neilesh Patel DDS and Elliot Mendelsohn MD in November 2005, HealthCare Volunteer has a large listing of health-related volunteering opportunities serving the non-profit sector. Volunteers include physicians, dentists, medical students, and dental assistants, who donate their time to provide services, including free surgery and dental care. The organization has direct patient care programs in over 10 countries, including India, Ecuador, Kenya, Tanzania, Liberia, Cameroon, and Paraguay.

In 2007, Patel was selected as a YouthActionNet Fellow in recognition of the organization's efforts, which was awarded at the Embassy of Finland in Washington DC. In 2008, Patel was awarded the UCLA Charles E Young Humanitarian Award for his work in global health. Patel reportedly dropped out of the UCLA MBA Program in 2007 after starting classes in his first quarter as the first-ever student in the integrated DDS/MBA program to focus on HV's growth.

Patel and Mendelsohn have also established HealthCare Tourism International, the first non-profit medical tourism accreditation service. Patel started his first non-profit StudentsHelp.org (www.studentshelp.org) at age 17, which helped provide computer services and technical support to needy people around the world.

In 2013, Patel received the Samuel S. Beard Award for Greatest Public Service by an Individual 35 Years or Under, an award given out annually by Jefferson Awards.

== Volunteer networking ==
One of the unique features of the HealthCare Volunteer website is its ability to allow volunteers to create online profiles and connect with other volunteers. Once volunteers have signed up and created their profiles, they can form volunteering teams for service at home or abroad.

== 'Free volunteering' philosophy ==
HealthCare Volunteer has sought to reduce the financial burdens for both volunteers and organizations. First, volunteers pay no money to search HealthCare Volunteer for volunteering opportunities nor must organizations pay any money to post their volunteering opportunities on HealthCare Volunteer. Secondly, HealthCare Volunteer strives to exclusively partner with organizations that do not charge their volunteers additional money beyond accommodation and other essential services to volunteer. HealthCare Volunteer believes that volunteers are already volunteering their time and effort, and should not be required to pay additional fees above the basic costs (travel, accommodation, and basic services).

== Organizational awards ==
In 2007, HealthCare Volunteer began awarding volunteers who helped advance the mission of HealthCare Volunteer.

2007 Awards:

Award	Recipient	Comments
Leadership	Ravi Raghavan	Awarded for exceptional leadership in fundraising, recruiting, public relations, and establishing new partnerships.
Medical Field Excellence - Tanzania	Dr. Samuel Feinstein	Recognizes outstanding contributions to medical care, particularly in under-served areas.
Dental Field Excellence - Tanzania	Dr. Jason Ehtessabian	Honors remarkable service in providing dental care to communities in need.
Innovation Award	Dr. Tara Athan, PhD	Given for creative solutions enhancing healthcare volunteerism, such as new platforms or technologies.
Opportunity Expansion Award - Tanzania	Erick Mlanga	Acknowledges efforts in creating new volunteering opportunities, expanding the organization's reach.
Organizational Award	Carolina Myans	Awarded to individuals or teams significantly advancing the organization's mission through operational contributions.
Student Volunteer Award	Colin Casault	Recognizes students who overcome challenges to provide volunteer healthcare services, exemplifying dedication and commitment.

2008 Awards:

Award	Chapter	Recipient	Comments
Leadership	INDIA	Ravi Raghavan	This award acknowledges the establishment of the India chapter of HealthCareVolunteer.
Medical Field Excellence - Galapagos Islands		Dr. Seth Podolsky	For public health medical work in Galapagos Islands
Dental Field Excellence		Andi Michels	For dental work in Tanzania
Innovation Award		Adil Shafique	For world's first health-related NGO and volunteer interactive, online map
Opportunity Expansion Award		Catherine Matthys	For creating volunteering opportunities in Tanzania
Student Volunteer Award		Sarah Richardson	For overcoming numerous obstacles to perform volunteer work in rural Tanzania

2023 Awards:

Award	Recipient	Comments
Leadership	Patrick R. Callico	With the launch of the Guatemala Chapter of HealthCareVolunteer.com and the establishment of a new team, we were able to bring aid and assistance to over 4,000 indigenous people.

== See also ==
- List of awards for volunteerism and community service
