= 2010 Green Party of England and Wales leadership election =

British party leadership election

- 14 September 2010
- Turnout: 3,279 (25.5%) ▼12.4 pp
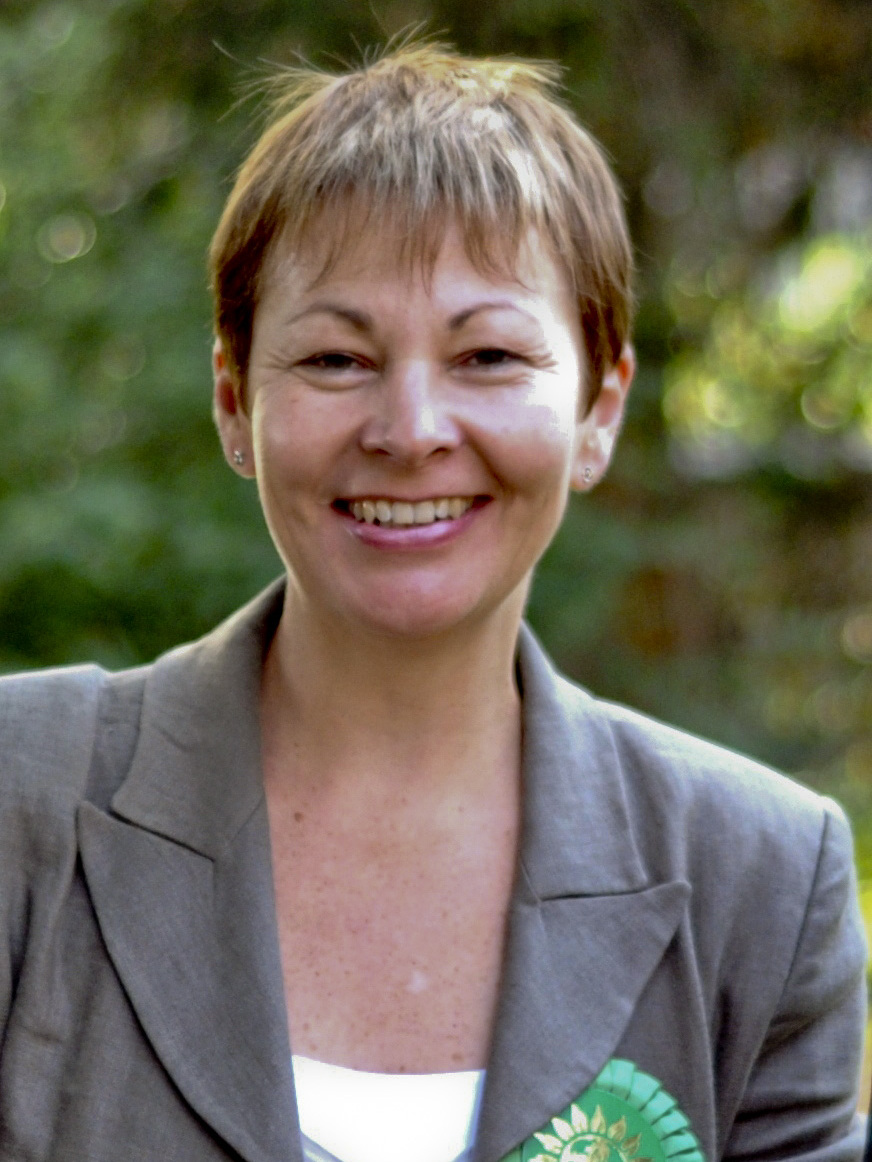
Candidate	Caroline Lucas
Popular vote	3,190
Percentage	97.9%
Leader before election
Caroline Lucas
Elected leader
Caroline Lucas

The 2010 Green Party of England and Wales leadership election took place in September 2010 to determine the leader of the Green Party of England and Wales. It was won unopposed by the incumbent leader, Caroline Lucas.

At the same time, Adrian Ramsay won re-election as deputy leader after defeating a challenge from the former principal speaker Derek Wall.

All members of the party were sent ballot papers in the post with their copy of the party's magazine, Green World and voting ended shortly after hustings were held at the party's autumn conference in Birmingham where members who had not already posted their ballot papers could vote in person at conference.

== Background ==
Prior to 2008, the party had used a system of principal speakers instead of leaders. Following an internal vote in 2007, the party elected individual leaders. Caroline Lucas, who had previously been elected as principal speaker, was chosen in 2008 as the first leader of the Green Party, beating Ashley Gunstock to win with more than 90% of the vote.

== Campaign ==
Caroline Lucas and Adrian Ramsay campaigned for re-election together and shared materials such as a website and leaflets promoting them both together.

Derek Wall campaigned with the support of internal group Green Left which he has been an active member of since its formation.

== Result ==
A total of 3,279 votes were cast in the postal ballot.

The results were as follows:

=== Leader ===
Candidate	Votes	%
Caroline Lucas	3,190	97.9%
Re-open nominations	68	2.1%
Turnout	3,258	25.5%

=== Deputy leader ===
Candidate	Votes	%
Adrian Ramsay	2,386	73.4%
Derek Wall	826	25.4%
Re-open nominations	39	1.2%
Turnout	3,251	25.5%
