= 2003 Norwich City Council election =

2003 UK local government election

The 2003 Norwich City Council election took place on 1 May 2003 to elect members of Norwich City Council in England. This was on the same day as other local elections. 16 of 48 seats (one-third) were up for election, with an additional seat up in Henderson ward due to a by-election.

== Result summary ==
2003 Norwich City Council election
Party	This election			Full council			This election		
Party	Seats	Net	Seats %	Other	Total	Total %	Votes	Votes %	+/−
Liberal Democrats	10	▲4	58.8	20	30	62.5	13,978	39.0	-5.1
Labour	5	▼4	29.4	10	15	31.3	11,176	31.2	-2.0
Green	2	Steady	11.8	0	2	4.1	5,689	15.9	+6.5
Conservative	0	Steady	0.0	1	1	2.0	4,539	12.7	+0.1
Independent	0	Steady	0.0	0	0	0.0	488	1.4	+0.9

== Ward results ==
=== Bowthorpe ===
Bowthorpe
Party	Candidate	Votes	%	±%
Labour	Ronald Borrett	1,102	43.6	−5.1
Liberal Democrats	Helen Arundell	617	24.4	−7.1
Conservative	Antony Little	603	23.8	+8.8
Green	Beth Brockett	208	8.2	+3.3
Majority		485	19.2	+1.9
Turnout		2,530	29.1	+2.5
Labour hold		Swing	▲1.0	

=== Catton Grove ===
Catton Grove
Party	Candidate	Votes	%	±%
Labour	Bernard Smith	630	38.3	−4.5
Conservative	Colin Barker	491	29.9	+1.2
Liberal Democrats	Paul Kendrick	337	20.5	−3.0
Green	Janet Bearman	186	11.3	+6.3
Majority		139	8.5	−5.6
Turnout		1,644	28.9	−1.1
Labour hold		Swing	▼2.9	

=== Coslany ===
Coslany
Party	Candidate	Votes	%	±%
Labour	H. Watson	846	42.9	+0.7
Liberal Democrats	Alan Strong	434	22.0	−8.7
Conservative	Ernest Horth	331	16.8	−3.1
Green	Adrian Holmes	231	11.7	+3.5
Independent	David Bethell	131	6.6	N/A
Majority		412	27.3	+15.8
Turnout		1,973	35.8	+3.3
Labour hold		Swing	▲4.7	

=== Crome ===
Crome
Party	Candidate	Votes	%	±%
Labour	Alan Waters	920	50.7	−0.3
Conservative	D. Lovewell	425	23.4	−1.7
Liberal Democrats	Roger Smith	375	20.7	−0.9
Green	Fiona Dowson	94	5.2	+2.9
Majority		495	27.3	+1.5
Turnout		1,814	35.8	+0.4
Labour hold		Swing	▲0.7	

=== Eaton ===
Eaton
Party	Candidate	Votes	%	±%
Liberal Democrats	Judith Lubbock	2,164	62.9	+0.3
Conservative	Ian Mackie	782	22.7	−2.3
Labour	J. Bremner	338	9.8	−0.4
Green	Neville Bartlett	159	4.6	+2.4
Majority		1,382	40.1	+2.5
Turnout		3,443	55.2	+1.3
Liberal Democrats hold		Swing	▲1.3	

=== Heigham ===
Heigham
Party	Candidate	Votes	%	±%
Liberal Democrats	M. Verran	860	45.6	−5.2
Labour	Carol Morrey	644	34.1	−1.0
Green	Rupert Read	382	20.3	+14.9
Majority		216	11.5	−4.2
Turnout		1,886	33.7	−2.2
Liberal Democrats hold		Swing	▼2.1	

=== Henderson ===
Henderson (2 seats due to by-election)
Party	Candidate	Votes	%	±%
Green	Jessica Goldfinch	1,011	47.5	+6.1
Green	Adrian Ramsay	991		
Labour	H. Panting	638	30.0	−0.4
Labour	John Sheridan	473		
Liberal Democrats	Phillip Bazley	355	16.7	−5.7
Liberal Democrats	Anne Stairs	305		
Conservative	C. Page	124	5.8	±0.0
Conservative	F. Leatherdale	112		
Turnout			35.7	−1.3
Green hold				
Green hold				

=== Lakenham ===
Lakenham
Party	Candidate	Votes	%	±%
Liberal Democrats	Linda Harper	938	48.2	−0.9
Labour	Charles Sanderson	657	33.7	−4.4
Conservative	Christine Munroe	224	11.5	+2.3
Green	Andrew Knighton	129	6.6	+2.9
Majority		281	14.4	+3.4
Turnout		1,948	36.4	−0.6
Liberal Democrats gain from Labour		Swing	▲1.8	

=== Mancroft ===
Mancroft
Party	Candidate	Votes	%	±%
Liberal Democrats	Diane Lowe	1,058	40.5	−1.2
Labour	P. Harris	882	33.7	−5.6
Conservative	Trevor Ivory	388	14.8	+2.4
Green	R. House	287	11.0	+4.4
Majority		176	6.7	+4.3
Turnout		2,615	38.3	+4.6
Liberal Democrats gain from Labour		Swing	▲2.2	

=== Mile Cross ===
Mile Cross
Party	Candidate	Votes	%	±%
Liberal Democrats	Victor Elvin	802	49.5	+2.3
Labour	B. Simpson	710	43.9	−4.6
Green	Jennifer Parkhouse	104	6.4	+2.2
Majority		92	5.7	—
Turnout		1,616	29.9	−2.0
Liberal Democrats gain from Labour		Swing	▲3.5	

=== Mousehold ===
Mousehold
Party	Candidate	Votes	%	±%
Labour	Nicholas Williams	778	41.3	+2.2
Liberal Democrats	Graham Hopkins	579	30.7	−8.7
Independent	Paul Scruton	357	18.9	+9.4
Green	L. Freaney	171	9.1	+5.7
Majority		199	10.6	—
Turnout		1,885	30.8	−1.9
Labour hold		Swing	▲5.5	

=== Nelson ===
Nelson
Party	Candidate	Votes	%	±%
Liberal Democrats	P. McAlenan	1,000	42.7	−9.4
Green	Robert Gledhill	835	35.6	+21.2
Labour	Stephen Cook	345	14.7	−12.2
Conservative	Victor Hopes	164	7.0	+0.3
Majority		165	7.0	−18.2
Turnout		2,344	42.4	+4.4
Liberal Democrats hold		Swing	▼15.3	

=== St. Stephen ===
St. Stephen
Party	Candidate	Votes	%	±%
Liberal Democrats	Thomas Wells	1,082	49.1	−2.3
Labour	S. Wright	534	24.2	−5.6
Green	Stephen Little	302	13.7	+7.5
Conservative	Richard Wells	287	13.0	+0.5
Majority		548	24.9	+3.3
Turnout		2,205	39.5	−2.5
Liberal Democrats gain from Labour		Swing	▲1.7	

=== Thorpe Hamlet ===
Thorpe Hamlet
Party	Candidate	Votes	%	±%
Liberal Democrats	Joyce Divers	1,106	57.3	−3.8
Labour	Julie Westmacott	384	19.9	−2.6
Conservative	M. Ivory	233	12.1	+3.4
Green	R. Farrington	206	10.7	+2.9
Majority		722	37.4	−1.2
Turnout		1,929	30.7	+3.0
Liberal Democrats hold		Swing	▼0.6	

=== Town Close ===
Town Close
Party	Candidate	Votes	%	±%
Liberal Democrats	Derek Wood	1,031	47.3	−13.1
Labour	Keith Driver	709	32.5	+6.8
Conservative	John Wyatt	240	11.0	+1.3
Green	Christopher Webb	199	9.1	+4.9
Majority		322	14.8	−19.8
Turnout		2,179	41.0	+1.8
Liberal Democrats hold		Swing	▼10.0	

=== University ===
University
Party	Candidate	Votes	%	±%
Liberal Democrats	Ian Williams	935	50.5	−12.2
Labour	Roy Blower	586	31.7	+8.0
Green	Katharine Willett	194	10.5	+5.0
Conservative	Dipesh Palana	135	7.3	−0.8
Majority		349	18.9	−20.1
Turnout		1,850	35.0	−0.8
Liberal Democrats hold		Swing	▼10.1	
