= BIG-register =

National registry for health care providers

The BIG-register (acronym: beroepen in de individuele gezondheidszorg; Dutch: professions in the individual healthcare) is a Dutch online registry for healthcare professionals. Healthcare professionals, such as physicians and 12 other professions, are required by law to register in the BIG-register before they can practise their profession or use their protected professional titles. The registry is freely accessible online, creating a method for the public to review whether or not their healthcare provider is registered.

== History ==
The registry was introduced on 1 December 1997 when the 1993 law on professions in the individual healthcare came into effect (Dutch: Wet op de beroepen in de individuele gezondheidszorg), replacing the 1865 law on exercising healthcare (Dutch: Wet Uitoefening Geneeskunst).

== Professions ==
The following professions are required to register in the BIG-register:

- allied medical care professional (temporary BIG registration; Dutch: bachelor medisch hulpverlener)
- clinical technologist (Dutch: klinisch technoloog)
- dentist (Dutch: tandarts)
- physician (Dutch: arts)
- health psychologist (Dutch: gezondheidszorgpsycholoog)
- midwife (Dutch: verloskundige)
- nurse (Dutch: verpleegkundige)
- pharmacist (Dutch: apotheker)
- psychotherapist (Dutch: psychotherapeut)
- physician assistant
- physiotherapist (Dutch: fysiotherapeut)
- registered dental hygienist (temporary BIG registration; Dutch: geregistreerd-mondhygiënist)
- remedial educationalist (Dutch: orthopedagoog-generalist)

== Protected professional title, registration, disciplinary law ==
Anyone who is not registered is not allowed to refer themselves by the name of the profession, even if they have the right education or practised in the past.
