= Universidad Privada San Juan Bautista =

Peruvian university

- Universidad Privada San Juan Bautista
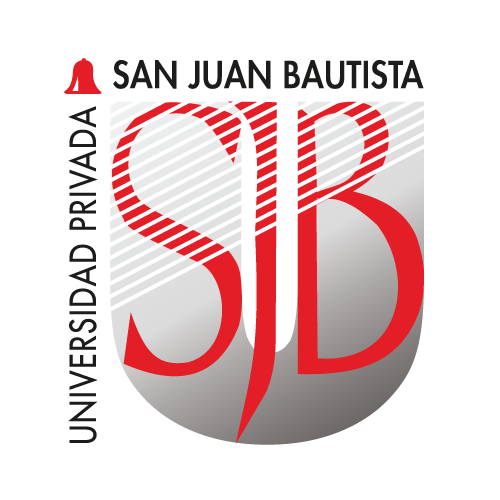
- Other names: UPSJB
- Motto: Preparando el Camino...
- Motto in English: Preparing the way...
- Type: Private
- Established: April 8, 1997
- Founders: Dr. José Luis Elías Avalos
- Rector: Dr. Rafael Urrelo Guerra
- Students: 15,000 (2017)
- Location: Av. José Antonio Lavalle s/n, Chorrillos, Lima, Peru; 12°11′47″S 77°0′27″W
- Campus: Urban
- Website: www.upsjb.edu.pe

Universidad Privada San Juan Bautista is a private university in the city of Lima, Peru. It offers 16 career programs categorized in 4 schools.
