= Shahid Sadoughi University of Medical Sciences =

Public university in Yazd, Iran

- دانشگاه علوم پزشكي و خدمات بهداشتي درماني شهيد صدوقي يزد
- Other name: Yazd University of Medical Sciences
- Type: Public
- Established: 1983
- Accreditation: Ministry of Health and Medical Education, MOHME
- President: Mahmoud Nourishadkam
- Faculty: 548
- Students: ~6000
- Location: Central Administration, Bahonar Sq. Yazd, Iran, Yazd, 8916978477, Iran
- Language: English, Persian
- Website: en.ssu.ac.ir ssu.ac.ir

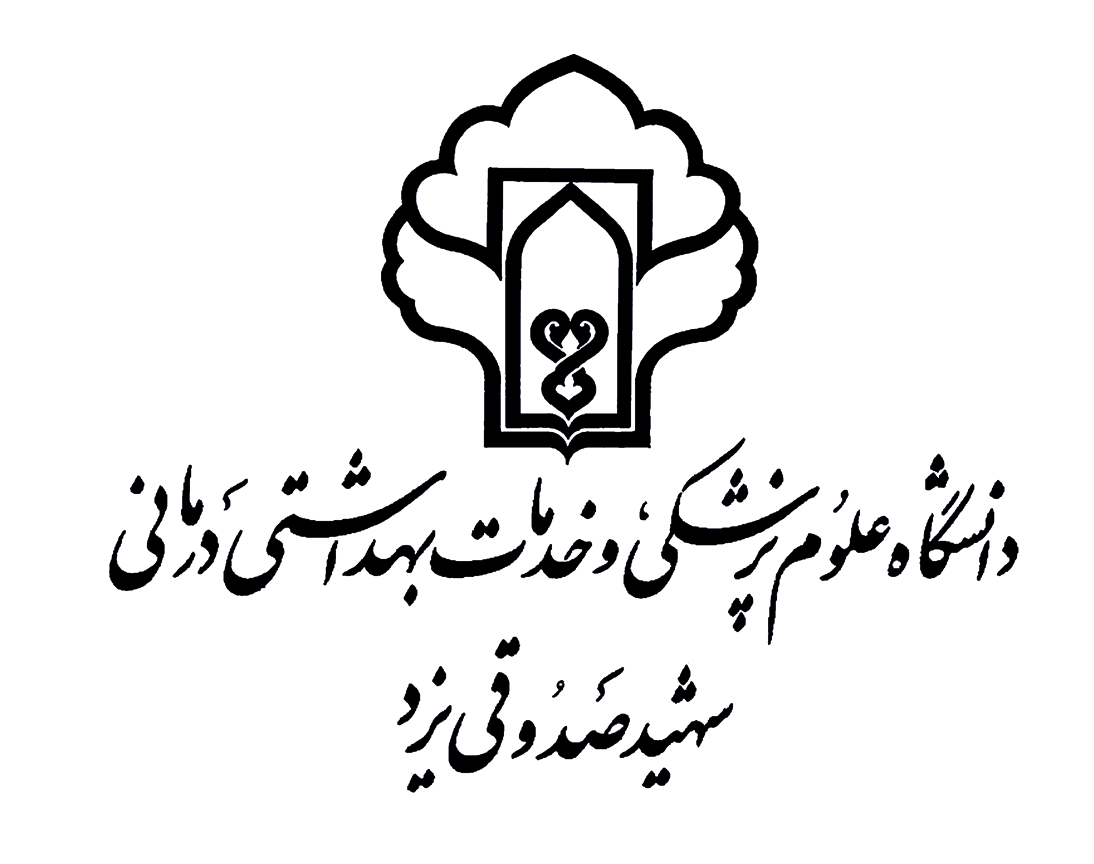
Shahid Sadoughi University of Medical Sciences

Shahid Sadoughi University of Medical Sciences is a public university located in the center of Iran in the city of Yazd. The university offers 115 degree programs in medicine, dentistry, public health, pharmacy, nursing, midwifery, paramedical sciences, and advanced medical technologies, ranging from bachelor's degrees to sub-specialties and fellowships.

== History ==
Shahid Sadoughi University of Medical Sciences and Health Services is the first medical university founded after the Islamic Revolution in 1983. This was followed by the establishment of the Schools of Nursing and Midwifery and Paramedical Sciences. In 1994, following the national plan of merging medical schools into the Ministry of Health and Medical Education, the School of Medicine was officially transformed into Shahid Sadoughi University of Medical Sciences.

As the University continued to expand, the Schools of Public Health and Dentistry were also established. Today, the University comprises seven vice-presidencies, 11 schools, 18 nationally recognized research centers, 13 university hospitals, and 10 district health networks. It serves approximately 6,000 students, of whom 12% are enrolled in postgraduate programs (M.Sc. and Ph.D.), while 6% are clinical residents and fellows pursuing specialty, subspecialty, and fellowship training programs.

== Overview ==
According to Iran's health care system, the president of medical sciences university in each province is in charge of the whole health care system and related educational affairs of that province.

== Academic Programs ==
Title	Degree title	Duration	Department
Anatomical Sciences	Master of Science (MSc)	2 years	Anatomical Sciences
Andrology	Fellowship		Urology
Anesthesia	Bachelor of Science (BS)	4 years	Anesthesia
Anesthesiology	Specialty	4 years	Anesthesiology
Bachelor of Medicine, Bachelor of Surgery	MBBS	5.5 years	International Campus
Biostatistics	Master of Science (MSc)	2 years	Biostatistics and Epidemiology
Biostatistics	Ph.D.	4 years	Biostatistics and Epidemiology
Cardiology	Specialty	4 years	Cardiology
Cardiovascular Diseases	Ph.D. by Research	4 years	Cardiology
Clinical Biochemistry	Master of Science (MSc)	2 years	Biochemistry
Clinical Biochemistry	Ph.D.	4 years	Biochemistry
Clinical Biochemistry	Ph.D. by Research	4 years	Biochemistry
Counseling in Midwifery	Master of Science (MSc)	2 years	Midwifery
Critical Care Nursing	Master of Science (MSc)	2 years	Critical Care Nursing
Dentistry	Professional Doctorate	6 years	School of Dentistry
Elderly Health	Master of Science (MSc)	2 years	Elderly Health
Emergency Medical Technology	Bachelor of Science (BS)	4 years	Emergency Medical Technology
Emergency Medical Technology	Discontinuous Bachelor's	2 years	Emergency Medical Technology
Emergency Medicine	Specialty	4 years	Emergency Medicine
Emergency Nursing	Master of Science (MSc)	2 years	Emergency Nursing
Endocrinology and Metabolism	Subspecialty	2 years	Endocrinology
Endodontics	Dental Specialty	3 years	Endodontics
Environmental Health	Ph.D.	4 years	Environmental Health
Environmental Health Engineering	Bachelor of Science (BS)	4 years	Environmental Health
Environmental Health Engineering	Master of Science (MSc)	2 years	Environmental Health
Epidemiology	Master of Science (MSc)	2 years	Biostatistics and Epidemiology
Epidemiology	Ph.D.	4 years	Biostatistics and Epidemiology
Ergonomics	Master of Science (MSc)	2 years	Ergonomics
Food Safety and Hygiene	Master of Science (MSc)	2 years	Food Safety and Hygiene
Food Science and Technology (Food Quality Control and Hygiene)	Master of Science (MSc)	2 years	Food Science and Technology
General Medicine	Professional Doctorate	7 years	School of Medicine
General Surgery	Specialty	4 years	General Surgery
Geriatric Nursing	Master of Science (MSc)	2 years	Geriatric Nursing
Health Care Management	Bachelor of Science (BS)	4 years	Health Management and Economics
Health Care Management	Master of Science (MSc)	2 years	Health Management and Economics
Health Economics	Master of Science (MSc)	2 years	Health Management and Economics
Health Education & Health Promotion	Ph.D.	4 years	Health Education and Promotion
Health Education and Promotion	Master of Science (MSc)	2 years	Health Education and Promotion
Health in Accidents and Disasters	Master of Science (MSc)	2 years	Health in Disaster and Emergencies
Health in Disaster and Emergencies	Ph.D.	4 years	Health in Disaster and Emergencies
Health Information Technology	Master of Science (MSc)	2 years	Health Information Technology and Management
Health Information Technology and Management	Bachelor of Science (BS)	4 years	Health Information Technology and Management
Health Policy	Ph.D. by Research	4 years	Health Management and Economics
Health Sciences in Nutrition	Master of Science (MSc)	2 years	Nutritional Sciences
Health Technology Assessment (HTA)	Master of Science (MSc)	2 years	Health Technology Assessment
Health, Safety, and Environment Management (HSE)	Master of Science (MSc)	2 years	Health, Safety, and Environment Management (HSE)
Human Ecology	Master of Science (MSc)	2 years	Environmental Health
Human Genetics	Master of Science (MSc)	2 years	Genetics
Immunology	Master of Science (MSc)	2 years	Immunology
Infectious Diseases & Tropical Medicine	Specialty	4 years	Infectious Diseases
Infertility	Fellowship		Obstetrics and Gynecology
Internal Medicine	Specialty	4 years	Internal Medicine
Master of Public Health (MPH)	Master of Science (MSc)	2 years	Social Medicine
Medical Biotechnology	Master of Science (MSc)	2 years	Medical Biotechnology
Medical Genetics	Ph.D.	4 years	Genetics
Medical Journalism	Master of Science (MSc)	2 years	Medical Journalism
Medical Laboratory Sciences (MLS)	Bachelor of Science (BS)	4 years	Medical Laboratory Sciences (MLS)
Medical Laboratory Sciences (MLS)	Discontinuous Bachelor's	2 years	Medical Laboratory Sciences (MLS)
Medical Nanotechnology	Master of Science (MSc)	2 years	Advanced Medical Technologies
Medical Parasitology	Master of Science (MSc)	2 years	Parasitology and Mycology
Medical Physics	Master of Science (MSc)	2 years	Medical Physics
Medical-Surgical Nursing	Master of Science (MSc)	2 years	Medical-Surgical Nursing
Microbiology	Master of Science (MSc)	2 years	Microbiology
Midwifery	Bachelor of Science (BS)	4 years	Midwifery
Midwifery	Discontinuous Bachelor's	2 years	Midwifery
Molecular Medicine	Ph.D.	4 years	Genetics
Neonatal Intensive Care Nursing	Master of Science (MSc)	2 years	Neonatal Intensive Care Nursing
Neonatal-Perinatal Medicine	Subspecialty	2 years	Neonatal-Perinatal Medicine
Neurosurgery	Specialty	4 years	Neurosurgery
Nursing	Bachelor of Science (BS)	4 years	Nursing
Nutritional Sciences	Bachelor of Science (BS)	4 years	Nutritional Sciences
Nutritional Sciences	Ph.D.	4 years	Nutritional Sciences
Nutritional Sciences	Ph.D. by Research	4 years	Nutritional Sciences
Obstetrics and Gynecology	Specialty	4 years	Obstetrics and Gynecology
Occupational Health Engineering	Bachelor of Science (BS)	4 years	Occupational Health
Occupational Health Engineering	Master of Science (MSc)	2 years	Occupational Health
Occupational Medicine	Specialty	4 years	Occupational Medicine
Operating Room	Master of Science (MSc)	2 years	Operating Room
Operating Room Technology	Bachelor of Science (BS)	4 years	Operating Room
Ophthalmology	Specialty	4 years	Ophthalmology
Oral & Maxillofacial Medicine	Dental Specialty	3 years	Oral & Maxillofacial Medicine
Oral and Maxillofacial Pathology	Dental Specialty	3 years	Oral and Maxillofacial Pathology
Oral and Maxillofacial Radiology	Dental Specialty	3 years	Oral and Maxillofacial Radiology
Oral and Maxillofacial Surgery	Dental Specialty	3 years	Oral and Maxillofacial Surgery
Orthodontics	Dental Specialty	3 years	Orthodontics
Orthopedics	Specialty	4 years	Orthopedics
Otorhinolaryngology Head & Neck Surgery (ENT)	Specialty	4 years	Otorhinolaryngology Head & Neck Surgery (ENT)
Pathology	Specialty	4 years	Pathology
Pediatric Dentistry	Dental Specialty	3 years	Pediatric Dentistry
Pediatric Nursing	Master of Science (MSc)	2 years	Nursing
Pediatrics	Specialty	4 years	Pediatrics
Perfusion Technology	Master of Science (MSc)	2 years	Physiology
Periodontics	Dental Specialty	3 years	Periodontics
Pharmacy	Professional Doctorate	6 years	
Physical and Rehabilitation Medicine (PRM)	Specialty	4 years	Physical and Rehabilitation Medicine
Physiology	Master of Science (MSc)	2 years	Physiology
Physiology	Ph.D. by Research	4 years	Physiology
Physiotherapy	Bachelor of Science (BS)	4 years	
Prevention and Control of Nosocomial Infections	Fellowship		Infectious Diseases
Prosthodontics	Dental Specialty	3 years	Prosthodontics
Psychiatry	Specialty	4 years	Psychiatry
Public Health	Bachelor of Science (BS)	4 years	Health Education and Promotion
Public Health	Discontinuous Bachelor's	2 years	Health Education and Promotion
Radiation Health	Master of Science (MSc)	2 years	Environmental Health
Radiology	Specialty	4 years	Radiology
Radiology Technology	Bachelor of Science (BS)	4 years	Radiology
Reproductive Biology	Ph.D.	4 years	
Reproductive Biology	Ph.D. by Research	2 years	
Restorative Dentistry	Dental Specialty	3 years	Restorative Dentistry
Rheumatology	Subspecialty	2 years	Rheumatology
Rhinology	Fellowship		Otorhinolaryngology Head & Neck Surgery (ENT)
Sexual and Reproductive Health	Ph.D.	4 years	Midwifery
Traditional Persian Medicine	Ph.D.	4 years	Persian Medicine
Urology	Specialty	4 years	Urology
Waste Management	Master of Science (MSc)	2 years	Environmental Health

== Schools ==
1. International Campus; 2. Medicine; 3. Public Health; 4. Dentistry; 5. Nursing and Midwifery; 6. Pharmacy	1. Paramedical Sciences; 2. Advanced Medical Technologies; 3. Persian Medicine (Ardakan); 4. Nursing (Meybod); 5. Paramedical Sciences (Abarkooh)

== Admission ==
Application process	Visa Process	Registration	Foreigners ID and Insurance

== Research ==
=== Research Institutes ===
==== Yazd Reproductive Sciences Institute ====
Affiliated research centers:

- Research and Clinical Center for Infertility
- Stem Cell Biology Research Center
- Abortion Research Center
- Biotechnology Research Center

==== Yazd Non‑Communicable Diseases Research Institute ====
Affiliated research centers:

- Yazd Cardiovascular Research Center
- Yazd Diabetes Research Center
- Hematology and Oncology Research Center
- Social Determinants of Health Research Center
- Addiction and Behavioral Sciences Research Center

=== Nationally recognized research centers ===
- Abortion Research Center
- Biotechnology Research Center
- Children Growth Disorder Research Center
- Environmental Science and Technology Research Center
- Hemotology & Oncology Research Center
- Industrial Diseases Research Center
- Infectious Diseases Research Center
- Mother and Newborn Health Research Center
- Otorhinolaryngology Research Center
- Reproductive Immunology Research Center
- Research and Clinical Center for Infertility
- Research Center for Nursing and Midwifery Care
- Research Center of Food Hygiene and Safety
- Social Determinants of Health Research Center
- Stem Cell Biology Research Center
- Trauma Research Center
- Yazd Cardiovascular Research Center
- Yazd Diabetes Research Center

== University hospitals ==
- Shahid Sadoughi Hospital
- Shahid Rahnemoon Hospital
- Afshar Hospital
- Shohadaye Mehrab Hospital
- Psychiatric Hospital
- Taft Shahid Beheshti Hospital
- Meybod Imam Jafar Sadegh Hospital
- Fatemeh Al-Zahra Hospital
- Ardakan Ziaei Hospital
- Abarkooh Khatam Alanbia Hospital
- Bahabad Hakim Hospital
- Bafq Valiasr Hospital
- Khatam Ayatollah Khatami Hospital

== See also ==
- Higher Education in Iran
