= Dental insurance =

Health insurance for dental care

Dental insurance is a form of health insurance designed to pay a portion of the costs associated with dental care.

== American dental insurance ==
The American Dental Association has lobbied against the US government providing dental insurance coverage for all Medicare recipients.

In the US, two-thirds of dentists do not accept dental insurance through Medicaid.

=== Types of dental plans ===
==== Preferred Provider Organizations (PPO) ====
With dental PPO plans, the patient pays a monthly premium that entitles them to receive coverage for certain dental services. The patient normally is obligated to pay a deductible and co-insurance. Patients may choose dentists from within a network of preferred providers for a lower out-of-pocket cost. Patients may choose dentists outside of the preferred network but often pay a higher co-insurance rate.

==== Indemnity plans ====
With indemnity dental plans, the insurance company generally pays the dentist a percentage of the cost of services. Restrictions may include the co-payment requirements, waiting period, stated deductible, annual limitations, graduated percentage scales based on the type of procedure, and the length of time that the policy has been owned.

==== Dental Health Maintenance Organizations (DHMO) ====
Dental Health Maintenance Organization plans entail dentists contracting with a dental insurance company that dentists agree to accept an insurance fee schedule and give their customers a reduced cost for services as an In-Network Provider. Many DHMO insurance plans have little or no waiting periods and no annual maximum benefit limitations, while covering major the United States, Participating Provider Network or PPO, also referred to as a Preferred Provider Organization, is an organization that contracts with healthcare providers to offer services at negotiated rates. The Preferred Provider Organization (PPO) model allows patients to receive care from both in-network and out-of-network providers. This organization has an agreement with an insurer or the third party administrator to provide health insurance to the people associated with their client at reduced or low rates. Participating Provider Network plan may work similar to a DHMO while using an In-Network facility. However, a PPO allows Out-of-Network or Non-Participating Providers to be used for service. Any difference of fees will become the financial responsibility of the patient, unless otherwise specified.

==== Other ====
Other plans include direct reimbursement, point of service plans, discount or referral plans, exclusive provider organizations, and table or schedule of allowances plans.

=== Payouts ===
Dental insurance companies divide benefits, services, or procedures into categories and refer to them with American Dental Association (ADA) 3-4 digit code. As an example, Preventive and Diagnostic procedures often include exams (ADA code 0120), x-rays (ADA code 0210), and basic cleanings or prophylaxis (ADA code 1110). Basic procedures often include fillings, periodontics, endodontics, and oral surgery. Major procedures often are crowns, dentures, and implants. Procedures such as periodontics, endodontics, and oral surgery may be considered major, depending on the policy.

Some dental insurance plans may have an annual maximum benefit limit. Once the annual maximum benefit is exhausted any additional treatments may become the patient's responsibility. Each year, the annual maximum is reissued. The reissue date may vary as a calendar year, company fiscal year, or date of enrollment based on the specific plan.

== See also ==
- NHS dentistry
