= Norwich City Council elections =

Elections for Norwich City councillors

One third of the Norwich City Council in Norfolk, England is elected each year. Since the last boundary changes in 2019, 39 councillors have been elected from 13 wards.

== Council history ==
For the majority of its history, the council has been under Labour control, with the party having held a majority of seats from 1973-2000, and again from 2012-2023. Between the 2023 and 2024 election, 3 Labour councillors resigned from the party to sit as independents, citing the direction of the party under the leadership of Keir Starmer. While remaining the largest party, this caused Labour to lose its majority for the first time since 2011, pushing the council to no overall control.

The Liberal Party (a predecessor party to the Liberal Democrats) first gained representation on the council following the 1980 election, with a single seat. After the Liberal Party and SDP merged to form the Liberal Democrats (then SLD) in 1988, the party made steady gains in both seats and vote share, culminating in them winning a majority of seats at the 2002 and 2003 elections.

However, the ascendancy of the Liberal Democrats was cut short, as the Green Party began winning seats on the council at the 2002 election. Rapid growth over the next decade increased the number of Green councillors from 2 in 2002, to 15 in 2012. This was primarily at the expense of the Liberal Democrats, whose seat numbers collapsed, and ultimately led to the Greens replacing them as a leading party on the council.

The Conservative Party won representation on the council from the inaugural 1973 election, providing the principal opposition to Labour from 1973-1986. However, their seat count began to decline from the 1983 election, and they were eventually usurped by the Liberal Democrats. They lost representation on the council at the 1996 election. Regaining seats in the 2000 election, they were again represented on the council until the 2012 election, when they lost all their seats. Since then, they have failed to win any seats and remain an extra-parliamentary opposition.

== Council elections ==
- 1973 Norwich City Council election
- 1976 Norwich City Council election
- 1979 Norwich City Council election (New ward boundaries)
- 1980 Norwich City Council election
- 1982 Norwich City Council election
- 1983 Norwich City Council election
- 1984 Norwich City Council election
- 1986 Norwich City Council election
- 1987 Norwich City Council election
- 1988 Norwich City Council election
- 1990 Norwich City Council election
- 1991 Norwich City Council election
- 1992 Norwich City Council election
- 1994 Norwich City Council election
- 1995 Norwich City Council election
- 1996 Norwich City Council election
- 1998 Norwich City Council election
- 1999 Norwich City Council election
- 2000 Norwich City Council election
- 2002 Norwich City Council election
- 2003 Norwich City Council election
- 2004 Norwich City Council election (New ward boundaries reduced the number of seats by 9)
- 2006 Norwich City Council election
- 2007 Norwich City Council election
- 2008 Norwich City Council election
- 2010 Norwich City Council election (By-elections in all 13 wards were held in September following a High Court ruling)
- 2011 Norwich City Council election
- 2012 Norwich City Council election
- 2014 Norwich City Council election
- 2015 Norwich City Council election
- 2016 Norwich City Council election
- 2018 Norwich City Council election
- 2019 Norwich City Council election (New ward boundaries)
- 2021 Norwich City Council election
- 2022 Norwich City Council election
- 2023 Norwich City Council election
- 2024 Norwich City Council election

== Council composition ==
Year	Labour	Liberal Democrats (Note: Includes totals for the predecessors of the Liberal Democrats, the Liberal Party and SDP (both of which participated in the Alliance).)	Green	Conservative	Independents & Others	Reform UK	Council control after election
Local government reorganisation; council established (48 seats)
1973	37	0	–	11	0		Labour
1976	36	0	0	12	0		Labour
New ward boundaries
1979	39	0	0	9	0		Labour
1980	37	1	0	9	1		Labour
1982	38	1	0	9	0		Labour
1983	37	2	0	9	0		Labour
1984	39	2	0	7	0		Labour
1986	38	2	0	4	0		Labour
1987	36	9	0	3	0		Labour
1988	37	9	0	2	0		Labour
1990	37	9	0	2	0		Labour
1991	38	7	0	3	0		Labour
1992	36	9	0	3	0		Labour
1994	36	10	0	2	0		Labour
1995	37	10	0	1	0		Labour
1996	37	11	0	0	0		Labour
1998	35	13	0	0	0		Labour
1999	33	15	0	0	0		Labour
2000	26	21	0	1	0		Labour
2002	19	26	2	1	0		Liberal Democrats
2003	15	30	2	1	0		Liberal Democrats
New ward boundaries; seats reduced from 48 to 39
2004	15	18	5	1	0		No overall control
2006	16	12	9	2	0		No overall control
2007	15	11	10	3	0		No overall control
2008	15	6	13	5	0		No overall control
2010	16	5	14	4	0		No overall control
2011	18	4	15	2	0		No overall control
2012	21	3	15	0	0		Labour
2014	21	3	15	0	0		Labour
2015	22	3	14	0	0		Labour
2016	26	3	10	0	0		Labour
2018	31	3	5	0	0		Labour
New ward boundaries
2019	27	3	9	0	0		Labour
2021	26	3	10	0	0		Labour
2022	25	3	11	0	0		Labour
2023	23	3	13	0	0		Labour
2024	19	3	15	0	2	0	No overall control
2026	12	3	21	0	2	2	Green

== Result maps ==
1980 results map

1982 results map

1983 results map

1984 results map

1986 results map

1987 results map

1988 results map

1990 results map

1991 results map

1992 results map

1994 results map

1995 results map

1996 results map

1998 results map

1999 results map

2000 results map

2002 results map

2003 results map

2004 results map

2006 results map

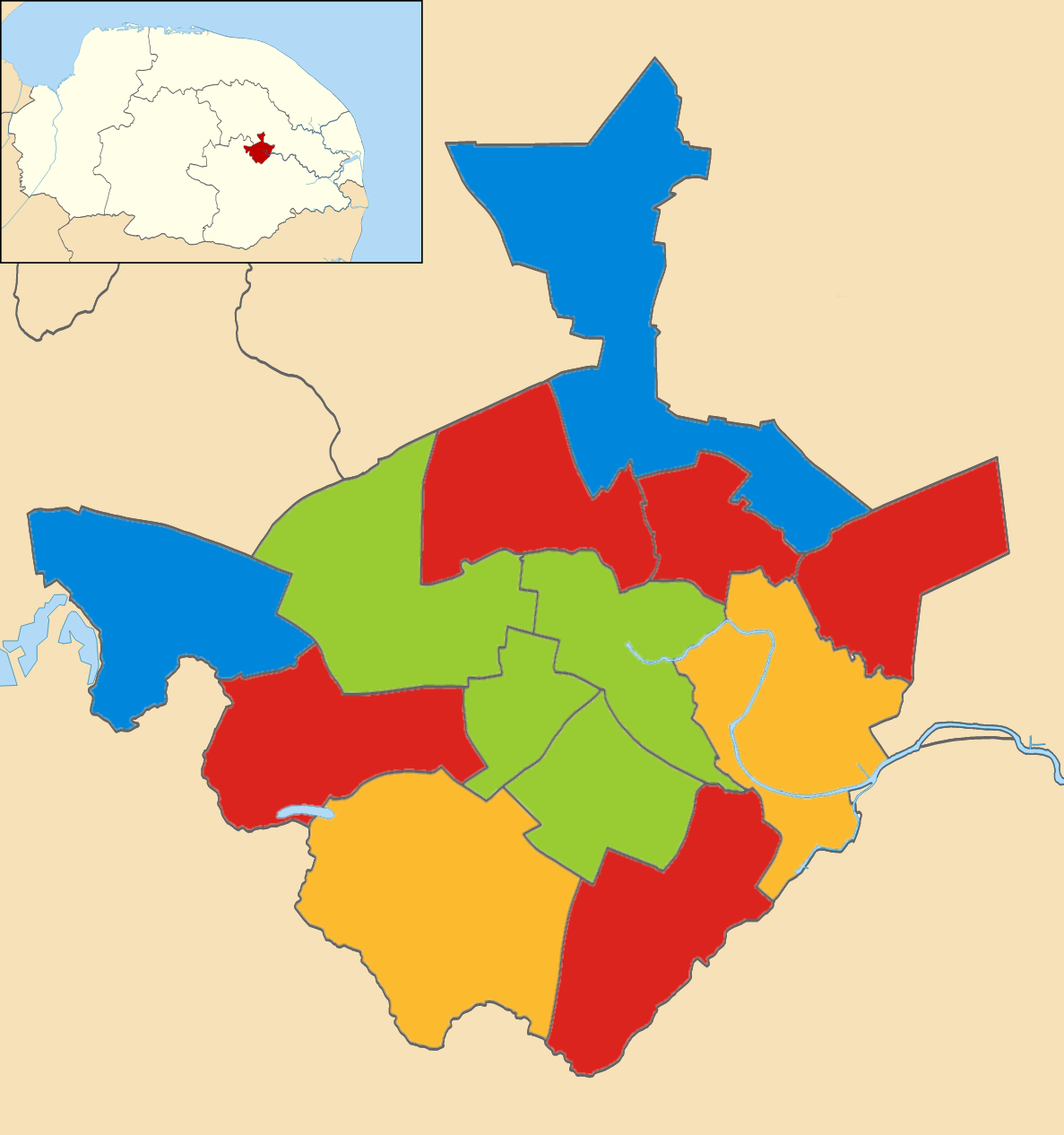
2007 results map

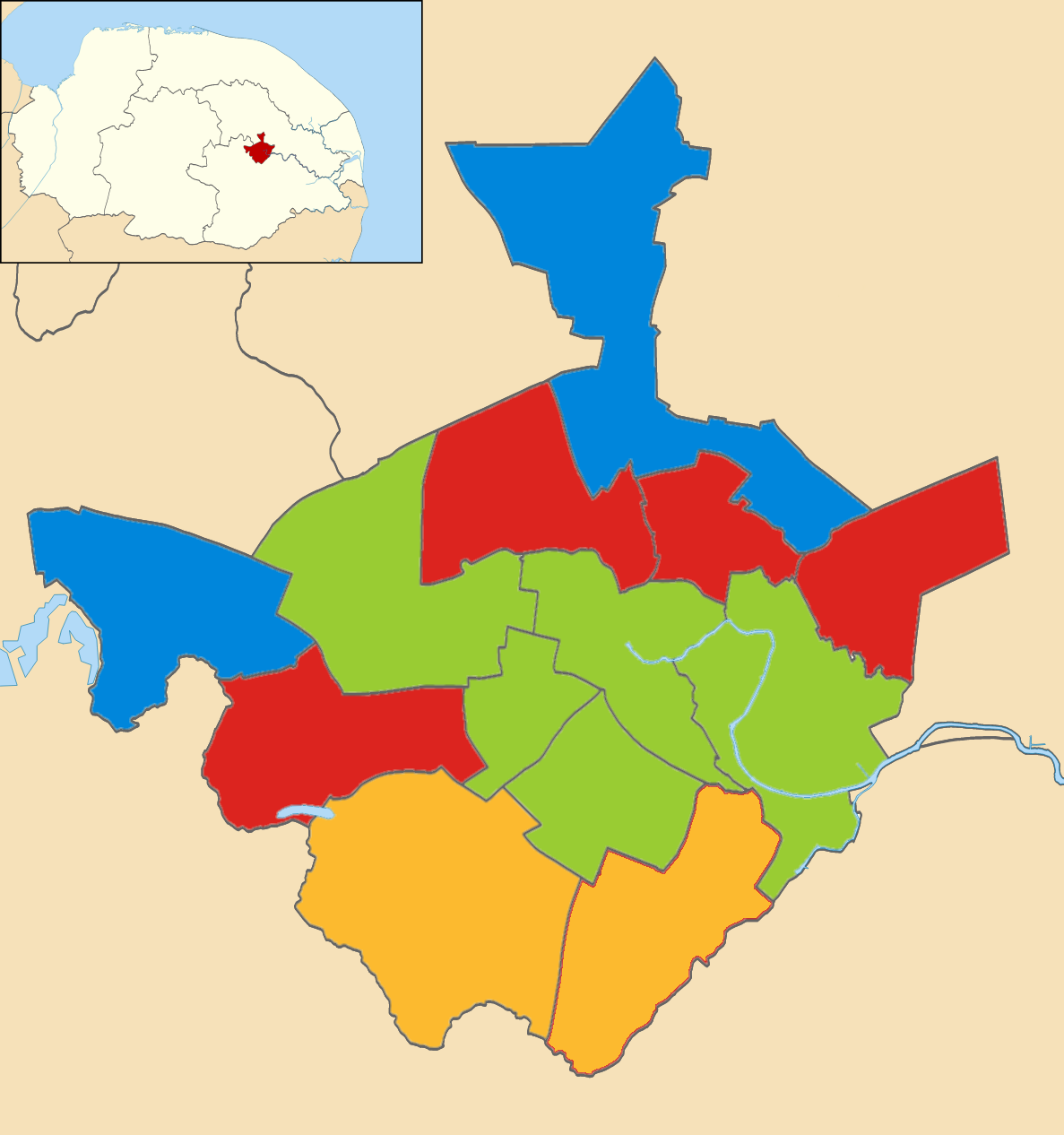
2008 results map

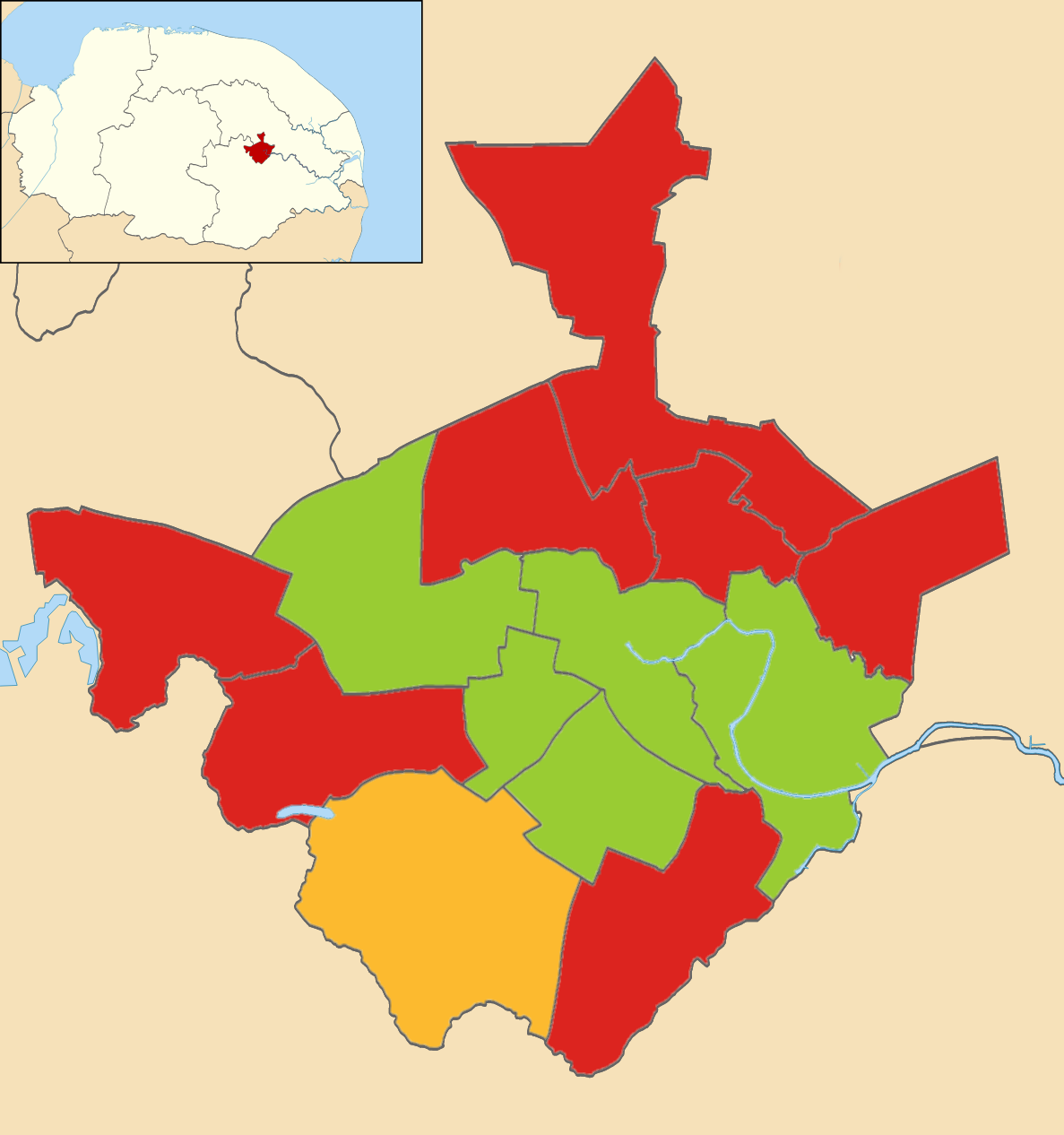
2010 results map

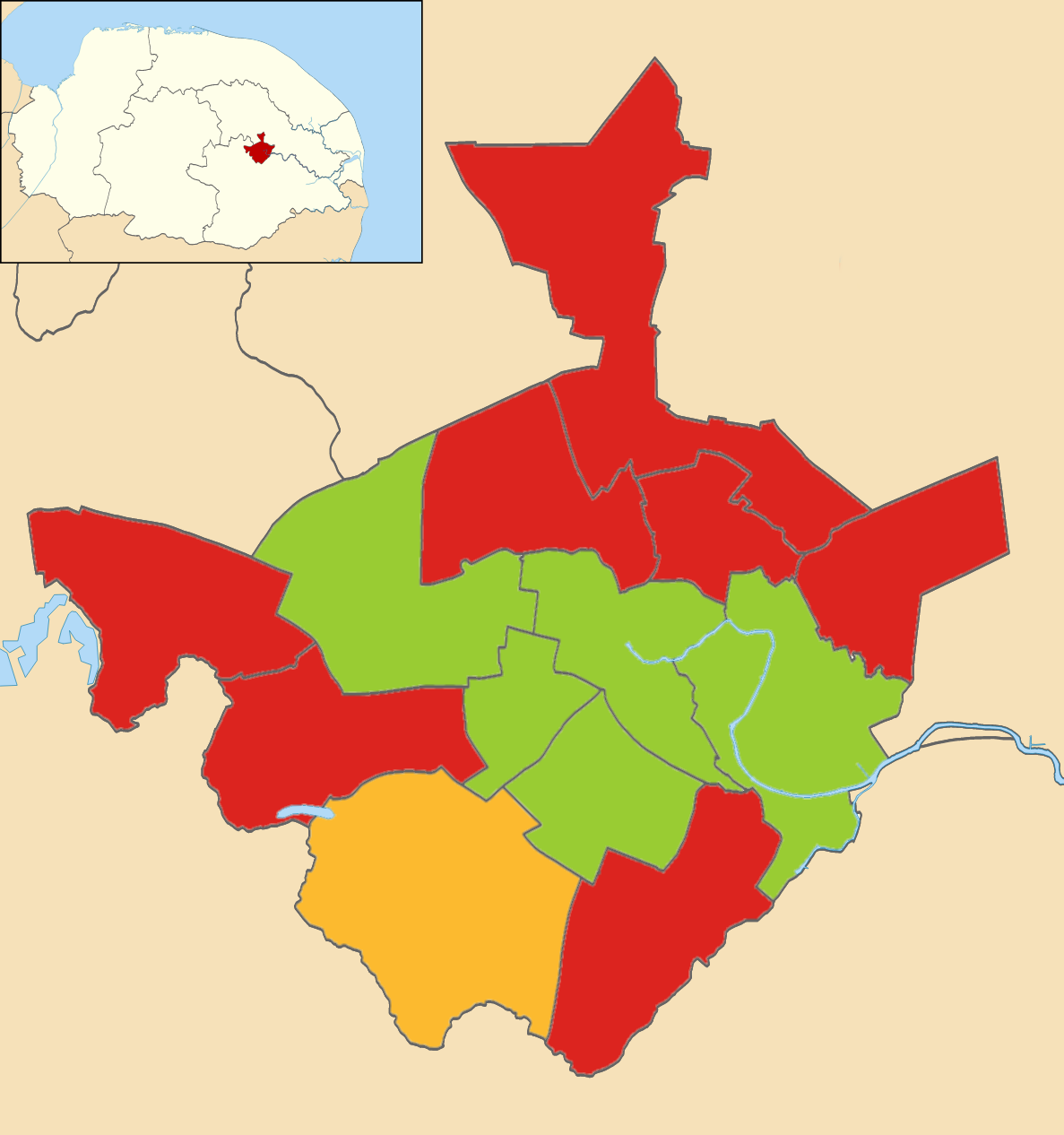
2011 results map

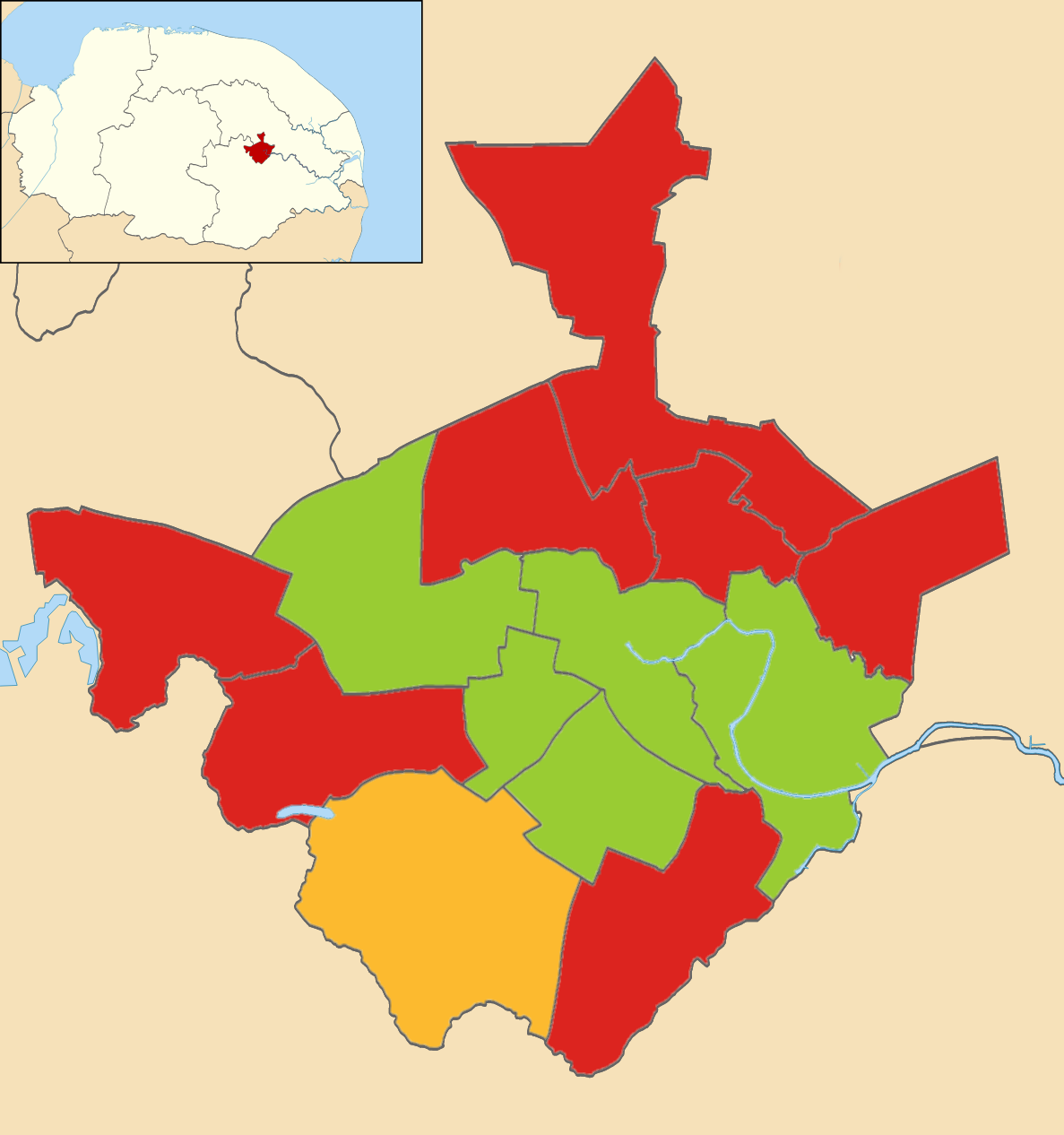
2012 results map

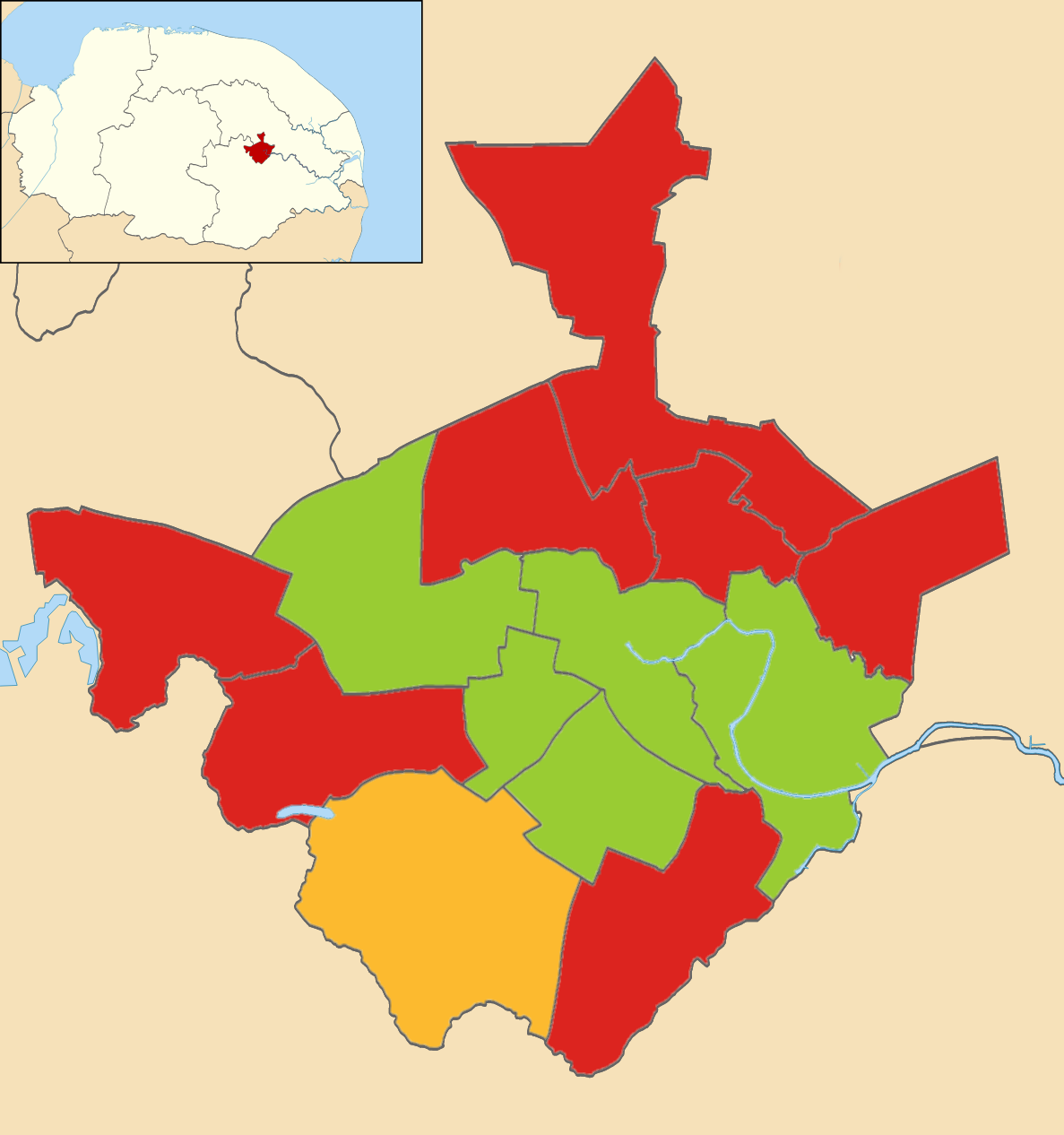
2014 results map

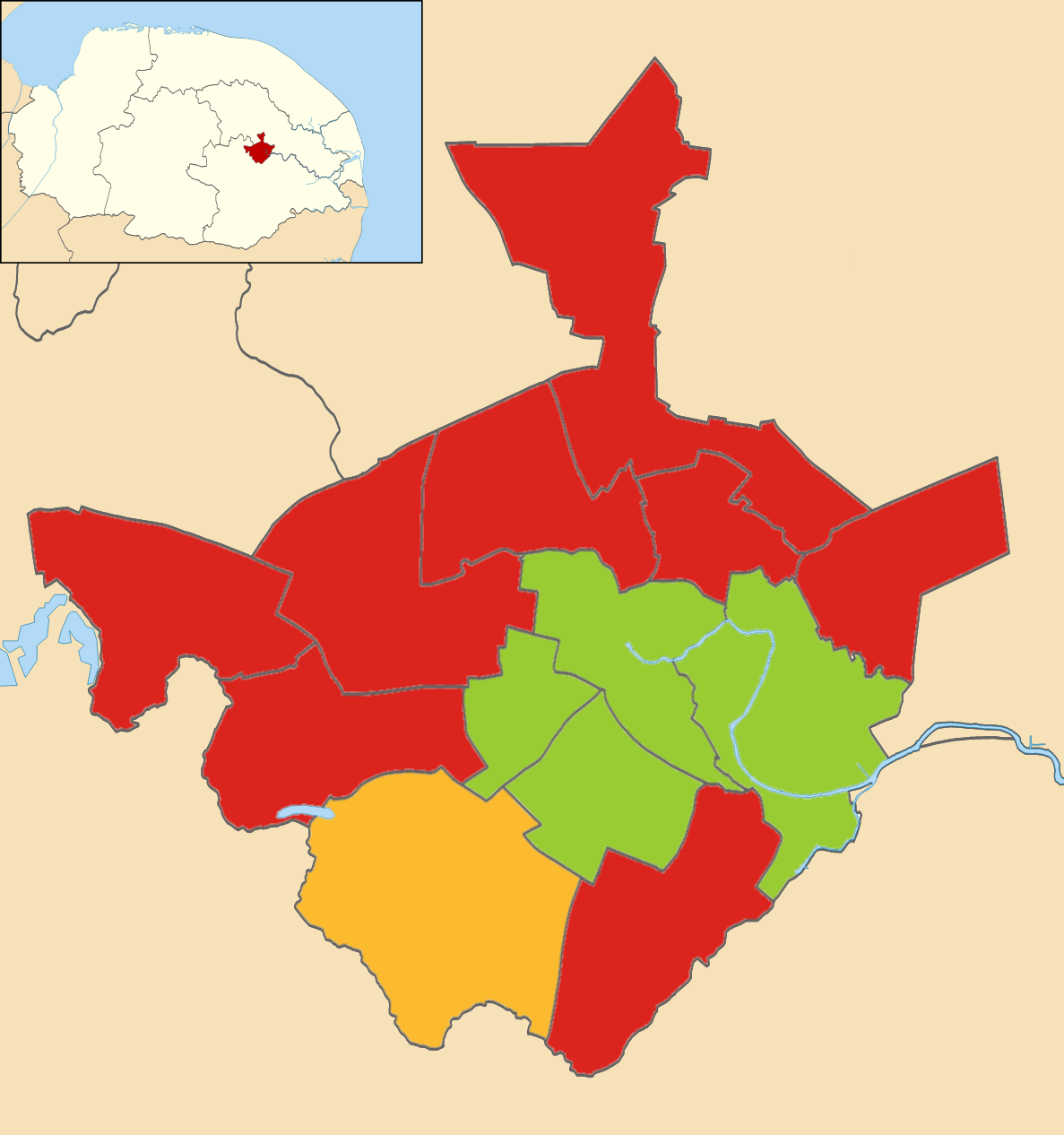
2015 results map

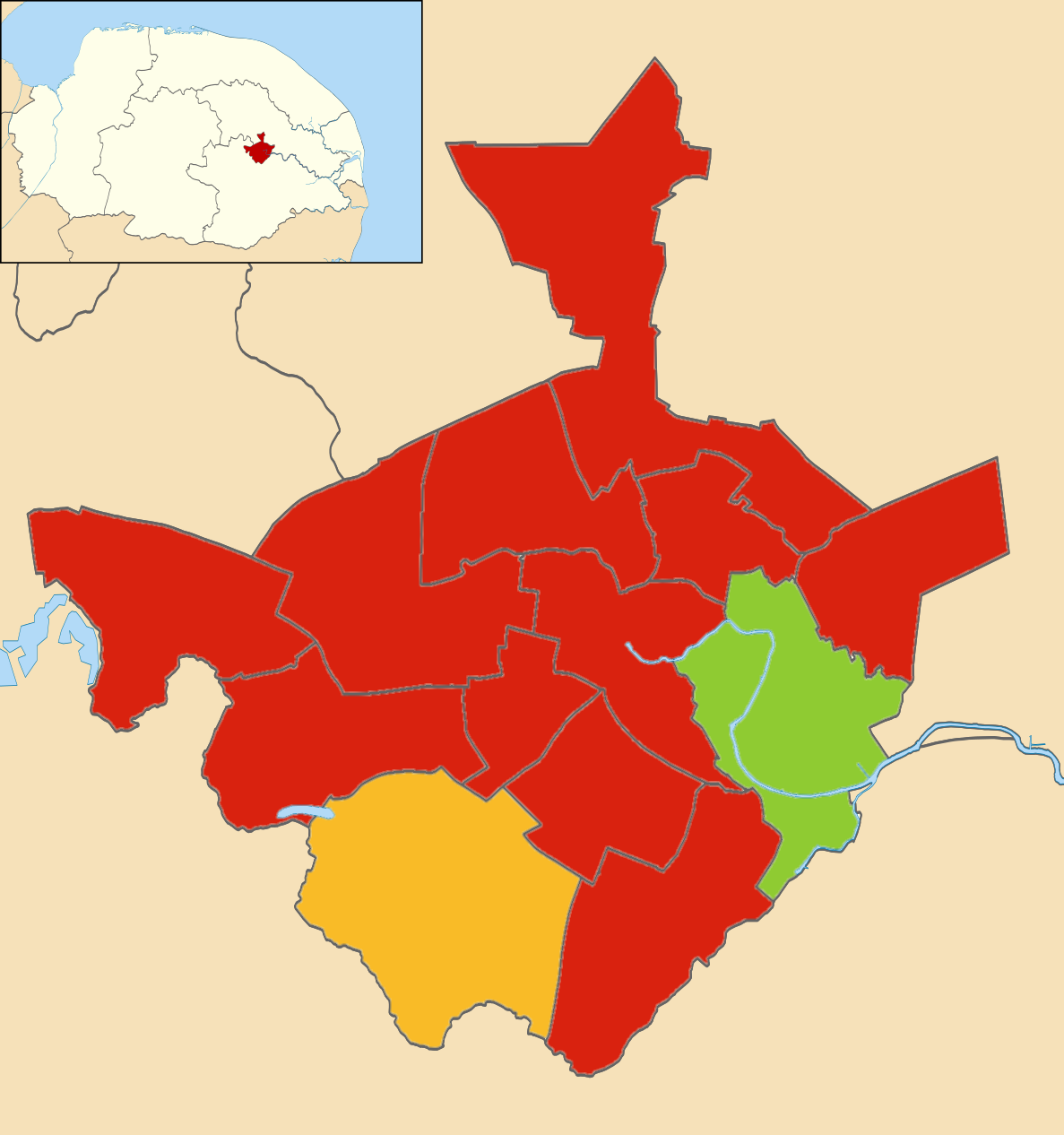
2016 results map

2018 results map

2019 results map

2021 results map

2022 results map

2023 results map

2024 results map

2026 results map

== By-election results ==
=== 1994-1998 ===
Lakenham By-Election 3 October 1996
Party	Candidate	Votes	%	±%
Labour		956	52.7	
Liberal Democrats		637	35.1	
Conservative		220	12.1	
Majority		319	17.6	
Turnout		1,813	32.6	
Labour hold		Swing		

Henderson By-Election 1 May 1997
Party	Candidate	Votes	%	±%
Labour		2,088	56.0	−8.1
Liberal Democrats		1,226	32.9	+15.9
Green		413	11.0	+1.1
Majority		862	13.1	
Turnout		3,727		
Labour hold		Swing		

=== 1998-2002 ===
Thorpe Hamlet By-Election 9 April 2001 (2)
Party	Candidate	Votes	%	±%
Liberal Democrats		755		
Liberal Democrats		738		
Labour		431		
Labour		407		
Conservative		144		
Conservative		142		
Green		81		
Green		74		
Turnout		2,772	22.0	
Liberal Democrats hold		Swing		

=== 2006-2010 ===
Mile Cross By-Election 27 July 2006
Party	Candidate	Votes	%	±%
Liberal Democrats	Carl Mayhew	789	46.1	+11.7
Labour	Barbara James	702	41.0	−0.7
Green	Susan Curran	115	6.7	−5.6
Conservative	David Mackie	106	6.2	−5.4
Majority		87	5.1	
Turnout		1,712	24.4	
Liberal Democrats hold		Swing		

Bowthorpe By-Election 12 March 2009
Party	Candidate	Votes	%	±%
Conservative	Andrew Wiltshire	915	35.8	−10.2
Labour	Jo Storie	761	29.8	−5.7
Liberal Democrats	Dave Thomas	686	26.8	+19.8
Green	Christine Way	193	7.6	−3.9
Majority		154	6.0	
Turnout		2,555	31.0	
Conservative hold		Swing		

=== 2010-2014 ===
Crome By-Election 19 December 2012
Party	Candidate	Votes	%	±%
Labour	Marion Frances Maxwell	884	59.3	−2.5
Conservative	Evelyn Jean Collishaw	259	17.4	−1.5
UKIP	Glenn Stuart Tingle	232	15.6	+15.6
Green	Judith Ford	73	4.9	−8.4
Liberal Democrats	Michael Anthony Sutton-Croft	42	2.8	−3.3
Majority		625		
Turnout				
Labour hold		Swing		

Nelson By-Election 19 December 2012
Party	Candidate	Votes	%	±%
Green	Andrew Boswell	1,121	56.0	−3.5
Labour	Layla Dickerson	599	29.9	+4.7
Liberal Democrats	Helen Anne Whitworth	174	8.7	+2.4
Conservative	Alexandra Rhiannon Davies	108	5.4	−3.6
Majority		522		
Turnout				
Green hold		Swing		

Mancroft By-Election 7 May 2013
Party	Candidate	Votes	%	±%
Green	Simeon Jackson	1,152	46.1	+3.3
Labour	Tony Waring	861	34.5	−3.0
Conservative	Samuel Stringer	308	12.3	+0.8
Liberal Democrats	Jeremy Hooke	177	7.1	−1.1
Majority		291	11.6	
Turnout		2,498		
Green hold		Swing		

Bowthorpe By-Election 1 May 2025
Party	Candidate	Votes	%	±%
Labour	Richard Lawes	689	31.5	−30.4
Reform	Nick Taylor	688	31.4	New
Green	Tony Arthur Park	430	19.6	+8.0
Conservative	Anthony Daniel Little	281	12.8	−4.8
Liberal Democrats	Sean Timothy Bennett	102	4.7	−4.2
Majority		1	0.1	
Turnout		2,190		
Labour hold		Swing	▼31.0	

Mancroft By-Election 1 May 2025
Party	Candidate	Votes	%	±%
Green	Ian Clifford Stutely	1,087	54.6	−7.3
Reform	Craig Barker	381	19.1	New
Labour	George Andrew Heaney	312	15.7	−10.8
Conservative	Edith Jones	106	5.3	−2.9
Liberal Democrats	Gordon Richard Dean	105	5.3	+1.8
Majority		706	35.5	
Turnout		1,991		
Green hold		Swing	▼13.2	

Sewell By-Election 1 May 2025
Party	Candidate	Votes	%	±%
Green	Jenny Knight	1,280	54.0	−4.4
Labour	Paul Guille	525	22.2	−8.6
Reform	Valerie Brind	367	15.5	+11.8
Liberal Democrats	Marlowe North	99	4.2	+1.6
Conservative	Simon Mark Jones	85	3.6	−0.9
Independent	His Excellency Freeman	13	0.5	New
Majority		755	31.8	
Turnout		2,369		
Green hold		Swing	▲6.5	

=== 2022-2026 ===
Bowthorpe By-Election 1 May 2025
Party	Candidate	Votes	%	±%
Labour	Richard Lawes	689	31.5	−30.4
Reform	Nick Taylor	688	31.4	+31.4
Green	Tony Park	430	19.6	+8.0
Conservative	Antony Little	281	12.8	−4.8
Liberal Democrats	Sean Bennett	102	4.7	−4.2
Majority		1	0.1	
Turnout		2,190		
Labour hold		Swing		

Mancroft By-Election 1 May 2025
Party	Candidate	Votes	%	±%
Green	Ian Stutely	1,087	54.6	−7.2
Reform	Craig Barker	381	19.1	+19.1
Labour	George Heaney	312	15.7	−10.7
Conservative	Edith Jones	106	5.3	−3.0
Liberal Democrats	Gordon Dean	105	5.3	+1.9
Majority		706	35.5	
Turnout		1,991		
Green hold		Swing		

Sewell By-Election 1 May 2025
Party	Candidate	Votes	%	±%
Green	Jenny Knight	1,280	54.0	−4.4
Labour	Paul Guille	525	22.2	−8.6
Reform	Valerie Brind	367	15.5	+11.8
Liberal Democrats	Marlowe North	99	4.2	+1.6
Conservative	Simon Jones	85	3.6	−0.9
Independent	His Excellency Freeman	13	0.5	+0.5
Majority		755	31.9	
Turnout		2,369		
Green hold		Swing		
