= 2008 Norwich City Council election =

2008 city council election for Norwich, England

← 2007	1 May 2008	2010 →

13 of 39 seats (One Third) to Norwich City Council 20 seats needed for a majority
	First party	Second party
Party	Labour	Green
Seats before	15	10
Seats won	4	5
Seats after	15	13
Seat change	Steady	▲3
Popular vote	8,738	10,140
Percentage	24.9%	28.9%
Swing	▼2.2%	▲11.6%
	Third party	Fourth party
Party	Liberal Democrats	Conservative
Seats before	11	3
Seats won	2	2
Seats after	6	5
Seat change	▼5	▲2
Popular vote	7,509	8,076
Percentage	21.4%	23.0%
Swing	▼11.0%	▲5.2%
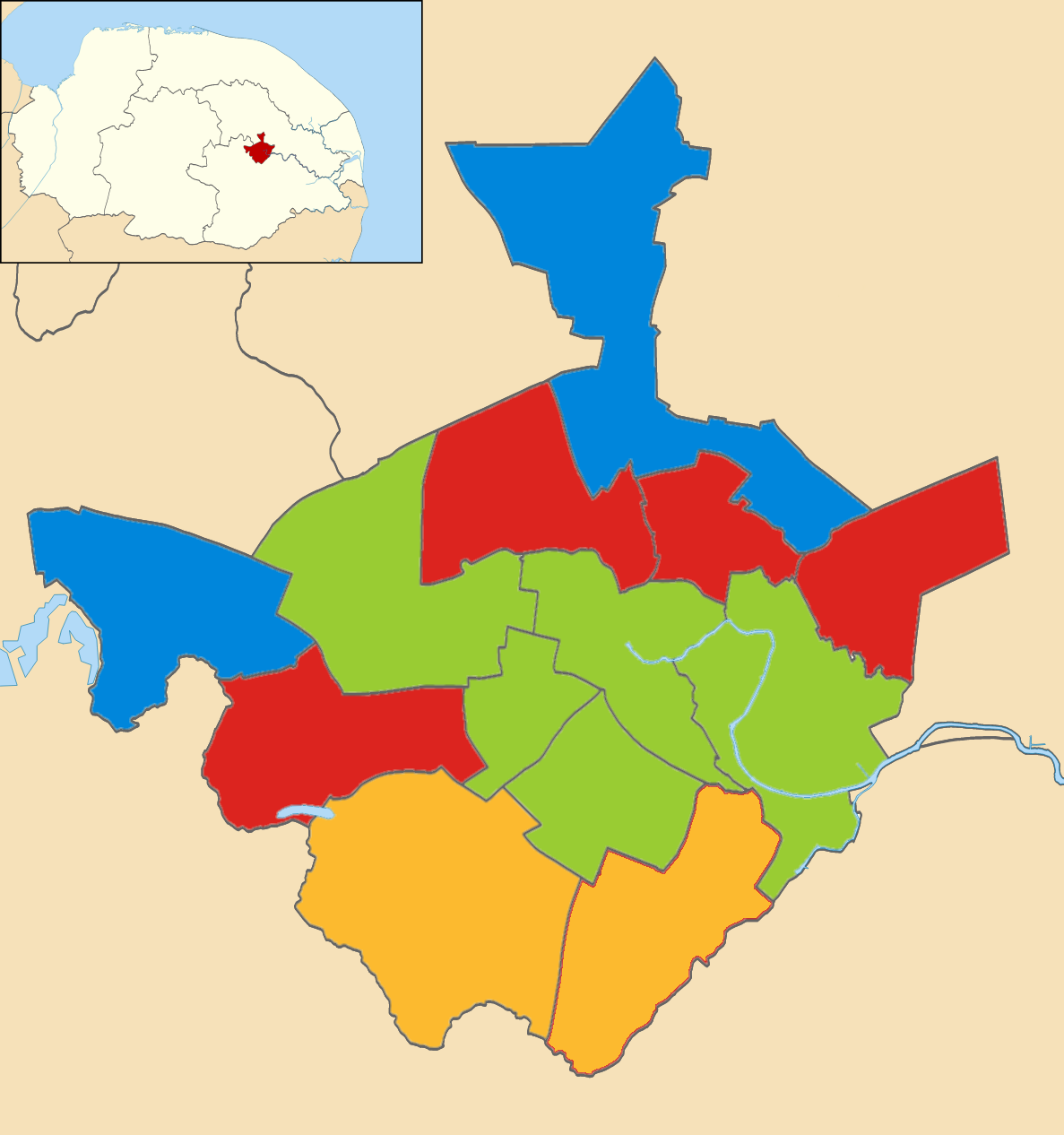
- Map showing the 2008 local election results in Norwich.
Council control before election
No Overall Control
Council control after election
No Overall Control

The 2008 Norwich City Council election took place on 1 May 2008 to elect members of Norwich City Council in England. One third of seats were up for election. This was on the same day as other local elections.

The Green Party won the most votes across Norwich for the first time, and won a plurality of the seats up for election. This marked the first time that the Greens had won a plurality of the votes and seats in a local authority election. It is also, as of 2024, the last time that the Greens won the most seats or votes in a Norwich City Council election.

However, as only 13 of 39 council seats were up for election, Labour remained the largest party.

As of 2024, the 2008 election is the last election to see any member of the Conservative Party elected to Norwich City Council.

All changes in vote share are calculated with reference to the 2004 election, the last time these seats were contested.

== Election result ==
Norwich Council Election Result 2008
Party	Seats	Gains	Losses	Net gain/loss	Seats %	Votes %	Votes	+/−
Green	5	3	0	+3	38.5	28.9	10,140	+11.6
Labour	4	2	2	±0	30.8	24.9	8,738	-2.2
Conservative	2	2	0	+2	15.4	23.0	8,076	+5.2
Liberal Democrats	2	0	5	–5	15.4	21.4	7,509	-11.0
Norwich Over The Water	0	0	0	±0	0.0	1.0	354	-0.5
UKIP	0	0	0	±0	0.0	0.7	240	N/A
Turnout						35.5	35,057	

Changes in vote share are relative to the last time these seats were contested in 2004.

== Council Composition ==
Prior to the election the composition of the council was:

↓
15	11	10	3
Labour	Lib Dem	Green	Con

After the election, the composition of the council was:

↓
15	13	6	5
Labour	Green	Lib Dem	Con

== Ward results ==
=== Bowthorpe ===
Bowthorpe
Party	Candidate	Votes	%	±%
Conservative	Niki George	1,268	46.0	+7.9
Labour	Brenda April Ferris	979	35.5	−2.2
Green	Jennifer Susan Toms	315	11.4	−1.8
Liberal Democrats	Haydn Perrett	195	7.1	−3.9
Majority		289	10.5	+10.1
Turnout		2,757	33.4	+2.3
Conservative gain from Labour		Swing	▲5.1	

=== Catton Grove ===
Catton Grove
Party	Candidate	Votes	%	±%
Conservative	John Frederick Fisher	917	40.0	−2.0
Labour	Julie Westmacott	797	34.8	−1.9
Green	Colin Hynson	321	14.0	+0.9
Liberal Democrats	Gordon Dean	255	11.1	+3.0
Majority		120	5.2	−0.1
Turnout		2,290	29.2	−2.1
Conservative gain from Labour		Swing	▼0.1	

=== Crome ===
Crome
Party	Candidate	Votes	%	±%
Labour	David Charles Bradford	954	41.9	−2.5
Conservative	Ernie Horth	704	30.9	+3.5
Green	Penelope Jane Edwards	348	15.3	+3.2
Liberal Democrats	Colin Douglas Penning	273	12.0	−4.1
Majority		250	11.0	−6.0
Turnout		2,279	31.8	−3.1
Labour hold		Swing	▼3.0	

=== Eaton ===
Eaton
Party	Candidate	Votes	%	±%
Liberal Democrats	Judith Elizabeth Lubbock	1,950	46.7	+6.0
Conservative	Niall Baxter	1,523	36.5	+3.5
Green	Richard Andrew Bearman	375	9.0	−2.5
Labour	Philip Martin David Taylor	324	7.8	−4.0
Majority		427	10.2	+2.5
Turnout		4,172	57.8	+3.0
Liberal Democrats hold		Swing	▲1.3	

=== Lakenham ===
Lakenham
Party	Candidate	Votes	%	±%
Liberal Democrats	David Angus Fairbairn	1,197	41.8	+5.6
Labour	Bob Sanderson	833	29.1	−10.4
Conservative	Eileen Olive Wyatt	327	11.4	+1.5
Green	Martine Jane Beattie	268	9.4	−0.6
UKIP	Steve Emmens	240	8.4	+4.0
Majority		364	12.7	—
Turnout		2,865	40.2	−0.2
Liberal Democrats hold		Swing	▲8.0	

=== Mancroft ===
Mancroft
Party	Candidate	Votes	%	±%
Green	Adrian St. John Holmes	1,099	43.1	+3.5
Labour	David Fullman	598	23.5	−3.0
Conservative	Andrew Wiltshire	491	19.3	+4.0
Liberal Democrats	Simon Richard Nobbs	360	14.1	−4.4
Majority		501	19.7	+6.6
Turnout		2,548	34.0	+1.6
Green gain from Liberal Democrats		Swing	▲3.3	

=== Mile Cross ===
Mile Cross
Party	Candidate	Votes	%	±%
Labour	Deborah Giwahi	778	39.2	−4.4
Conservative	Clive George Smith	443	22.3	+9.2
Liberal Democrats	Chris Thomas	439	22.1	−8.3
Green	Christine Patricia Way	325	16.4	+3.6
Majority		335	16.9	+3.7
Turnout		1,985	26.6	−5.0
Labour gain from Liberal Democrats		Swing	▼6.8	

=== Nelson ===
Nelson
Party	Candidate	Votes	%	±%
Green	Bob Gledhill	1,906	65.3	+3.7
Labour	Peter William Bartram	359	12.3	−0.6
Liberal Democrats	Gavin Andrew Holmes	356	12.2	−4.6
Conservative	Malcom Andrew Chamberlin	283	9.7	+0.9
Majority		1,547	53.0	+8.2
Turnout		2,919	39.7	−2.3
Green hold		Swing	▲2.2	

=== Sewell ===
Sewell
Party	Candidate	Votes	%	±%
Labour	Michael John Banham	687	29.4	−9.6
Green	Penelope Mary Killingbeck	579	24.8	+0.8
Conservative	David John Mackie	425	18.2	−0.8
Norwich Over The Water	Paul Scruton	354	15.2	N/A
Liberal Democrats	Ian Robert Williams	290	12.4	−5.5
Majority		108	4.6	−10.4
Turnout		2,335	31.1	−0.8
Labour hold		Swing	▼5.2	

=== Thorpe Hamlet ===
Thorpe Hamlet
Party	Candidate	Votes	%	±%
Green	Peter Offord	1,360	46.1	+11.6
Liberal Democrats	Jacky Sutton	859	29.1	−5.4
Conservative	Matthew Simon Davison	425	14.4	−1.1
Labour	Eamonn Burgess	305	10.3	−5.2
Majority		501	17.0	—
Turnout		2,949	37.0	+1.6
Green gain from Liberal Democrats		Swing	▲8.5	

=== Town Close ===
Town Close
Party	Candidate	Votes	%	±%
Green	Samir Abbas Jeraj	1,317	41.9	−2.4
Liberal Democrats	David John Munday	750	23.9	+1.8
Conservative	Tak-Man Li	591	18.8	+0.2
Labour	Andreas Kevin Paterson	483	15.4	+0.5
Majority		567	18.1	−4.1
Turnout		3,141	38.5	−2.6
Green gain from Liberal Democrats		Swing	▼2.1	

=== University ===
University
Party	Candidate	Votes	%	±%
Labour	Brenda Arthur	1,052	43.4	−6.8
Green	Armandine Jacqueline Blanche Stone	708	29.2	+13.2
Conservative	Paul Anthony George Wells	333	13.7	+3.8
Liberal Democrats	Andrew Norris Wright	332	13.7	−6.8
Majority		344	14.2	−15.5
Turnout		2,425	33.2	+0.1
Labour gain from Liberal Democrats		Swing	▼10.0	

=== Wensum ===
Wensum
Party	Candidate	Votes	%	±%
Green	Ruth Alexandra Makoff	1,219	50.6	+1.5
Labour	Stephanie Bridget Clark	589	24.5	−0.2
Conservative	Mike Gillespie	346	14.4	+3.3
Liberal Democrats	Brian Ralph Clark	253	10.5	−4.5
Majority		630	26.2	+1.8
Turnout		2,407	30.5	+0.7
Green hold		Swing	▲0.9	
