= 2022 Norwich City Council election =

2022 UK local government election

← 2021	5 May 2022	2023 →

13 out of 39 seats to Norwich City Council 20 seats needed for a majority

	First party	Second party	Third party
Party	Labour	Green	Liberal Democrats
Seats before	26	10	3
Seats won	8	4	1
Seats after	25	11	3
Seat change	▼1	▲1	Steady
Popular vote	16,336	10,540	3,711
Percentage	45.2%	29.2%	10.3%
Swing	▲7.2pp	▼1.2pp	▼4.5pp
- Winner of each seat at the 2022 Norwich City Council election
Council control before election
Labour
Council control after election
Labour

The 2022 Norwich City Council election took place on 5 May 2022 to elect members of Norwich City Council in England. This was on the same day as other local elections. 13 of 39 seats (one-third) were up for election.

== Results summary ==
2022 Norwich City Council election
Party	This election			Full council			This election		
Party	Seats	Net	Seats %	Other	Total	Total %	Votes	Votes %	+/−
Labour	8	▼1	61.5	17	25	64.1	16,336	45.2	▲7.2
Green	4	▲1	30.8	7	11	28.2	10,540	29.2	▼1.2
Conservative	0	Steady	0.0	0	0	0.0	5,521	15.3	▲1.3
Liberal Democrats	1	Steady	7.7	2	3	7.7	3,711	10.3	▼4.5
Independent	0	Steady	0.0	0	0	0.0	41	0.1	▼1.8

Changes in vote share are relative to the last time these seats were contested in 2019.

== Ward results ==
=== Bowthorpe ===
Bowthorpe
Party	Candidate	Votes	%	±%
Labour	Mike Sands	1,170	59.0	+7.1
Conservative	Oscar Houseago	409	20.6	−8.7
Green	Maddie Lyall	221	11.1	N/A
Liberal Democrats	Sean Bennett	184	9.3	+3.5
Majority		761	38.4	
Turnout			29.1	
Labour hold		Swing	▲7.9	

=== Catton Grove ===
Catton Grove
Party	Candidate	Votes	%	±%
Labour	Paul Kendrick	1,236	53.8	+6.3
Conservative	Hassan Iqbal	563	24.5	−11.2
Green	Tony Park	355	15.5	+2.4
Liberal Democrats	Ian Williams	143	6.2	+2.4
Majority		673	29.3	
Turnout		2,297	29.5	
Labour hold		Swing	▲8.8	

=== Crome ===
Crome
Party	Candidate	Votes	%	±%
Labour	Claire Kidman	1,360	52.4	+7.8
Conservative	Steve Barber	828	31.9	−7.1
Green	James Killbery	294	11.3	−1.8
Liberal Democrats	Nigel Lubbock	115	4.4	+1.2
Majority		532	20.5	
Turnout		2,597	31.7	
Labour hold		Swing	▲7.5	

=== Eaton ===
Eaton
Party	Candidate	Votes	%	±%
Liberal Democrats	Caroline Ackroyd	2,069	48.4	+4.1
Labour	Peter Prinsley	1,310	30.6	+8.0
Conservative	John Ward	560	13.1	−9.5
Green	Jane Saunders	336	7.9	−2.5
Majority		759	17.8	
Turnout		4,275	55.3	
Liberal Democrats hold		Swing	▼2.0	

=== Lakenham ===
Lakenham
Party	Candidate	Votes	%	±%
Labour	Gurpreet Padda	1,391	56.7	+9.2
Conservative	Robert Hammond	464	18.9	−9.0
Green	Sabine Virani	363	14.8	−0.8
Liberal Democrats	Paul Davies	237	9.7	+0.6
Majority		927	37.8	
Turnout		2,455	32.1	
Labour hold		Swing	▲9.1	

=== Mancroft ===
Mancroft
Party	Candidate	Votes	%	±%
Green	Jamie Osborn	1,606	61.9	+7.5
Labour Co-op	Jess Carrington	691	26.6	−3.4
Conservative	Iain Gwynn	243	9.4	−4.0
Liberal Democrats	Gordon Dean	55	2.1	−0.1
Majority		915	35.3	
Turnout		2,595	35.3	
Green hold		Swing	▲5.5	

=== Mile Cross ===
Mile Cross
Party	Candidate	Votes	%	±%
Labour	Vivien Thomas	1,135	59.1	+7.5
Conservative	Eric Masters	382	19.9	−7.3
Green	Gunnar Eigener	318	16.5	−0.1
Liberal Democrats	Desmond Fulcher	87	4.5	−0.1
Majority		753	39.2	
Turnout		1,922	25.2	
Labour hold		Swing	▲7.4	

=== Nelson ===
Nelson
Party	Candidate	Votes	%	±%
Green	Julie Young	2,138	53.3	−0.2
Labour	Lynda Groves	1,476	36.8	+0.6
Conservative	John Fisher	226	5.6	−2.1
Liberal Democrats	David Fairbairn	132	3.3	+0.8
Independent	Simon Redding	41	1.0	N/A
Majority		662	16.5	
Turnout		4,013	49.4	
Green hold		Swing	▼0.4	

=== Sewell ===
Sewell
Party	Candidate	Votes	%	±%
Green	Alex Catt	1,580	51.4	+5.3
Labour	Matt Packer	1,182	38.5	−1.2
Conservative	Anthony Little	238	7.7	−4.9
Liberal Democrats	Helen Arundell	71	2.3	+0.7
Majority		398	12.9	
Turnout		3,071	40.7	
Green gain from Labour		Swing	▲3.3	

=== Thorpe Hamlet ===
Thorpe Hamlet
Party	Candidate	Votes	%	±%
Green	Ben Price	1,450	51.3	+10.0
Labour	Cavan Stewart	852	30.1	−3.9
Conservative	Simon Jones	413	14.6	−4.4
Liberal Democrats	Jeremy Hooke	114	4.0	±0.0
Majority		598	21.2	
Turnout		2,829	37.7	
Green hold		Swing	▲7.0	

=== Town Close ===
Town Close
Party	Candidate	Votes	%	±%
Labour	Cate Oliver	1,968	57.7	+6.1
Green	Willem Buttinger	661	19.4	−1.2
Conservative	Mary Chacksfied	534	15.7	−5.3
Liberal Democrats	Carol Chilton	246	7.2	+0.4
Majority		1,307	38.3	
Turnout		3,409	43.4	
Labour hold		Swing	▲3.7	

=== University ===
University
Party	Candidate	Votes	%	±%
Labour Co-op	Matthew Fulton-McAlister	1,170	55.9	+2.1
Green	Tom Holloway	483	23.1	+2.4
Conservative	Jane Fisher	293	14.0	−5.7
Liberal Democrats	James Hawketts	148	7.1	+1.3
Majority		687	32.8	
Turnout		2,094	29.8	
Labour hold		Swing	▼0.2	

=== Wensum ===
Wensum
Party	Candidate	Votes	%	±%
Labour Co-op	Kevin Maguire	1,395	53.5	+6.4
Green	Liam Calvert	735	28.2	±0.0
Conservative	David King	368	14.1	−7.1
Liberal Democrats	Alex Atkins	110	4.2	+0.7
Majority		660	25.3	
Turnout		2,608	32.2	
Labour hold		Swing	▲3.2	
