= 1996 Norwich City Council election =

1996 UK local government election

The 1996 Norwich City Council election took place on 2 May 1996 to elect members of Norwich City Council in England. This was on the same day as other local elections. 16 of 48 seats (one-third) were up for election, with three additional seats up due to by-elections in Coslany, St. Stephen and Thorpe Hamlet wards.

== Results summary ==
1996 Norwich City Council election
Party	This election			Full council			This election		
Party	Seats	Net	Seats %	Other	Total	Total %	Votes	Votes %	+/−
Labour	14	Steady	73.7	23	37	77.1	20,131	53.3	-3.9
Liberal Democrats	5	▲1	26.3	6	11	22.9	10,916	28.9	+2.4
Conservative	0	▼1	0.0	0	0	0.0	5,681	15.0	+0.6
Green	0	Steady	0.0	0	0	0.0	870	2.3	+0.9
Independent	0	Steady	0.0	0	0	0.0	186	0.5	+0.2

== Ward results ==
=== Bowthorpe ===
Bowthorpe
Party	Candidate	Votes	%	±%
Labour	B. Ferris	1,399	69.4	−0.9
Liberal Democrats	N. Lubbock	272	13.5	−0.2
Conservative	M. Gant	234	11.6	−0.8
Green	S. Pollard	112	5.6	+2.1
Majority		1,127	55.9	−0.7
Turnout		2,017	24.3	−6.0
Labour hold		Swing	▼0.4	

=== Catton Grove ===
Catton Grove
Party	Candidate	Votes	%	±%
Labour	B. Morrey	885	63.0	−1.0
Conservative	M. Wilkinson	299	21.3	+2.9
Liberal Democrats	S. Richardson	220	15.7	+0.5
Majority		586	41.7	−3.9
Turnout		1,334	25.7	−5.0
Labour hold		Swing	▼2.0	

=== Coslany ===
Coslany (2 seats due to by-election)
Party	Candidate	Votes	%	±%
Labour	C. Coath	1,174	62.6	−2.2
Labour	M. Pendred	1,037		
Liberal Democrats	I. Williams	384	20.5	+5.0
Liberal Democrats	P. Young	323		
Conservative	E. Horth	317	16.9	+1.4
Conservative	E. Collishaw	314		
Turnout			29.9	
Labour hold				
Labour hold				

=== Crome ===
Crome
Party	Candidate	Votes	%	±%
Labour	A. Waters	1,170	60.0	−5.5
Conservative	J. Fisher	462	23.7	+7.5
Liberal Democrats	E. Maxfield	318	16.3	−1.9
Majority		708	36.3	−11.0
Turnout		1,950	35.5	−4.6
Labour hold		Swing	▼6.5	

=== Eaton ===
Eaton
Party	Candidate	Votes	%	±%
Liberal Democrats	A. Aalders-Dunthorne	1,527	44.6	+3.6
Conservative	J. Virgo	1,135	33.1	+0.1
Labour	C. Slorach	764	22.3	−3.7
Majority		392	11.4	+3.4
Turnout		3,426	52.6	−4.3
Liberal Democrats gain from Conservative		Swing	▲1.8	

=== Heigham ===
Heigham
Party	Candidate	Votes	%	±%
Labour	C. Morrey	1,166	68.7	+0.2
Liberal Democrats	N. Park	338	19.9	−2.5
Conservative	V. Rayna	193	11.4	+2.2
Majority		828	48.8	+2.7
Turnout		1,697	30.4	−8.7
Labour hold		Swing	▲1.4	

=== Henderson ===
Henderson
Party	Candidate	Votes	%	±%
Labour	J. Sillett	1,069	64.1	−8.7
Liberal Democrats	P. Meacock	283	17.0	+4.7
Green	J. Button	165	9.9	+3.4
Conservative	S. Collier	150	9.0	+0.6
Majority		786	47.2	−13.3
Turnout		1,667	28.9	−3.5
Labour hold		Swing	▼6.7	

=== Lakenham ===
Lakenham
Party	Candidate	Votes	%	±%
Labour	K. Brown	1,266	67.8	−0.1
Conservative	M. Dewings	302	16.2	+0.3
Liberal Democrats	B. Banks	299	16.0	−0.3
Majority		964	51.6	±0.0
Turnout		1,867	33.7	−3.8
Labour hold		Swing	▼0.2	

=== Mancroft ===
Mancroft
Party	Candidate	Votes	%	±%
Labour	J. Lay	1,130	57.4	−7.4
Conservative	J. Knight	406	20.6	±0.0
Liberal Democrats	C. Risebrook	266	13.5	−1.1
Green	A. St. John Holmes	165	8.4	N/A
Majority		724	36.8	−7.4
Turnout		1,967	31.1	−4.5
Labour hold		Swing	▼3.7	

=== Mile Cross ===
Mile Cross
Party	Candidate	Votes	%	±%
Labour	S. Betts	982	79.1	+0.8
Liberal Democrats	D. Hicketts	160	12.9	±0.0
Conservative	J. Fisher	99	8.0	−0.7
Majority		822	66.2	+0.8
Turnout		1,241	23.6	−7.0
Labour hold		Swing	▲0.4	

=== Mousehold ===
Mousehold
Party	Candidate	Votes	%	±%
Labour	C. Sanderson	1,113	65.8	−3.5
Liberal Democrats	J. Lloyd	278	16.4	+3.4
Conservative	E. Kirton	205	12.1	−1.3
Green	L. Moore	96	5.7	+1.3
Majority		835	49.3	−6.6
Turnout		1,692	28.1	−4.4
Labour hold		Swing	▼3.5	

=== Nelson ===
Nelson
Party	Candidate	Votes	%	±%
Labour	D. Pardey	1,253	48.2	−0.9
Liberal Democrats	D. Munday	900	34.6	−6.4
Independent	C. Davis	161	6.2	N/A
Conservative	G. Drake	160	6.2	+0.4
Green	K. McNulty	125	4.8	+1.2
Majority		353	13.6	+5.5
Turnout		2,599	50.5	−3.1
Labour gain from Liberal Democrats		Swing	▲2.8	

=== St. Stephen ===
St. Stephen
Party	Candidate	Votes	%	±%
Labour	S. Gale	1,186	55.3	−7.7
Labour	J. Swainson	1,127		
Conservative	M. Dean	442	20.6	+0.5
Conservative	T. Wright	366		
Liberal Democrats	C. Turner	310	14.5	+3.2
Liberal Democrats	M. Verran	224		
Green	S. Pennington	207	9.7	N/A
Turnout			35.9	
Labour hold				
Labour hold				

=== Thorpe Hamlet ===
Thorpe Hamlet
Party	Candidate	Votes	%	±%
Liberal Democrats	I. Bowling	981	55.2	+3.5
Liberal Democrats	M. Shopland	931		
Labour	J. Dunbar	588	33.1	−5.1
Labour	G. Cossey	554		
Conservative	R. Sumner	208	11.7	+1.6
Turnout			28.5	
Liberal Democrats hold				
Liberal Democrats hold				

=== Town Close ===
Town Close
Party	Candidate	Votes	%	±%
Liberal Democrats	A. Thomas	1,530	53.2	+5.7
Labour	W. Carpenter	1,112	38.7	−4.8
Conservative	J. Wyatt	207	7.2	−0.6
Independent	D. Mills	25	0.9	N/A
Majority		418	14.5	+10.5
Turnout		2,874	52.4	−2.9
Liberal Democrats hold		Swing	▲5.3	

=== University ===
University
Party	Candidate	Votes	%	±%
Liberal Democrats	D. Hume	1,372	50.6	+5.6
Labour	P. Harris	1,156	42.7	−5.2
Conservative	C. Page	182	6.7	−0.4
Majority		216	7.9	N/A
Turnout		2,710	48.0	−2.1
Liberal Democrats gain from Labour		Swing	▲5.4	
