= 1995 Norwich City Council election =

1995 UK local government election

The 1995 Norwich City Council election took place on 4 May 1995 to elect members of Norwich City Council in England. This was on the same day as other local elections. 16 of 48 seats (one-third) were up for election.

== Results summary ==
1995 Norwich City Council election
Party	This election			Full council			This election		
Party	Seats	Net	Seats %	Other	Total	Total %	Votes	Votes %	+/−
Labour	13	▲1	81.3	24	37	77.1	21,561	57.2	+1.8
Liberal Democrats	3	Steady	18.8	7	10	20.8	10,002	26.5	-3.7
Conservative	0	▼1	0.0	1	1	2.1	5,424	14.4	+1.1
Green	0	Steady	0.0	0	0	0.0	521	1.4	+0.3
Independent	0	Steady	0.0	0	0	0.0	131	0.3	N/A
Natural Law	0	Steady	0.0	0	0	0.0	47	0.1	New

== Ward results ==
=== Bowthorpe ===
Bowthorpe
Party	Candidate	Votes	%	±%
Labour	R. Borrett	1,740	70.3	+0.1
Liberal Democrats	N. Lubbock	340	13.7	−1.4
Conservative	H. Collins	307	12.4	+1.0
Green	S. Pollard	87	3.5	+0.2
Majority		1,400	56.6	+1.5
Turnout		2,474	30.3	−5.0
Labour hold		Swing	▲0.8	

=== Catton Grove ===
Catton Grove
Party	Candidate	Votes	%	±%
Labour	D. Hook	1,101	64.0	−4.8
Conservative	M. Wilkinson	316	18.4	+4.5
Liberal Democrats	A. Moore	262	15.2	−2.2
Green	B. Brodskis	42	2.4	N/A
Majority		785	45.6	−5.8
Turnout		1,721	30.7	−2.5
Labour hold		Swing	▼4.7	

=== Coslany ===
Coslany
Party	Candidate	Votes	%	±%
Labour	H. Watson	1,518	64.8	−1.4
Conservative	E. Horth	363	15.5	−0.3
Liberal Democrats	I. Williams	362	15.5	+1.1
Green	A. Holmes	82	3.5	−0.1
Natural Law	J. Crampton	17	0.7	N/A
Majority		1,155	49.3	−1.0
Turnout		2,342	39.0	−0.4
Labour hold		Swing	▼0.6	

=== Crome ===
Crome
Party	Candidate	Votes	%	±%
Labour	B. Simpson	1,452	65.5	−3.1
Liberal Democrats	M. Martins	404	18.2	±0.0
Conservative	E. Collishaw	360	16.2	+3.0
Majority		1,048	47.3	−3.1
Turnout		2,216	40.1	−1.2
Labour hold		Swing	▼1.6	

=== Eaton ===
Eaton
Party	Candidate	Votes	%	±%
Liberal Democrats	J. Lubbock	1,514	41.0	+0.9
Conservative	J. Virgo	1,218	33.0	−0.3
Labour	P. Cross	962	26.0	−0.6
Majority		296	8.0	+1.2
Turnout		3,694	56.9	+2.2
Liberal Democrats gain from Conservative		Swing	▲0.6	

=== Heigham ===
Heigham
Party	Candidate	Votes	%	±%
Labour	C. Semmens	1,500	68.5	+18.1
Liberal Democrats	N. Park	490	22.4	−22.8
Conservative	V. Rayna	201	9.2	+4.8
Majority		1,010	46.1	+40.9
Turnout		2,191	39.1	−10.5
Labour hold		Swing	▲20.5	

=== Henderson ===
Henderson
Party	Candidate	Votes	%	±%
Labour	H. Panting	1,359	72.8	+1.4
Liberal Democrats	D. Munday	229	12.3	−8.4
Conservative	S. Collier	157	8.4	+0.5
Green	J. Button	122	6.5	N/A
Majority		1,130	60.5	+9.8
Turnout		1,867	32.4	−2.5
Labour hold		Swing	▲4.9	

=== Lakenham ===
Lakenham
Party	Candidate	Votes	%	±%
Labour	A. Brown	1,423	67.9	+0.3
Liberal Democrats	B. Banks	341	16.3	−1.5
Conservative	E. Cooper	333	15.9	+1.2
Majority		1,082	51.6	—
Turnout		2,097	37.5	+1.1
Labour hold		Swing	▲0.9	

=== Mancroft ===
Mancroft
Party	Candidate	Votes	%	±%
Labour	E. Burgess	1,461	64.8	+2.7
Conservative	J. Knight	464	20.6	+2.1
Liberal Democrats	C. Risebrook	329	14.6	−0.8
Majority		997	44.2	+0.6
Turnout		2,254	35.6	−1.9
Labour hold		Swing	▲0.3	

=== Mile Cross ===
Mile Cross
Party	Candidate	Votes	%	±%
Labour	J. Bunker	1,301	78.3	+0.9
Liberal Democrats	D. Hicketts	215	12.9	−0.6
Conservative	M. Windscheffel	145	8.7	−0.3
Majority		1,086	65.4	+1.5
Turnout		1,661	30.6	−1.7
Labour hold		Swing	▲0.7	

=== Mousehold ===
Mousehold
Party	Candidate	Votes	%	±%
Labour	T. Gordon	1,385	69.3	+16.8
Conservative	I. Evans	267	13.4	+5.2
Liberal Democrats	E. Maxfield	259	13.0	−22.9
Green	L. Moore	88	4.4	+1.0
Majority		1,118	55.9	+39.2
Turnout		1,999	32.5	−6.0
Labour hold		Swing	▲5.8	

=== Nelson ===
Nelson
Party	Candidate	Votes	%	±%
Labour	S. Morphew	1,374	49.1	+5.5
Liberal Democrats	A. High	1,148	41.0	−8.4
Conservative	G. Drake	162	5.8	−0.1
Green	S. Pennington	100	3.6	N/A
Natural Law	B. Parsons	13	0.5	N/A
Majority		226	8.1	—
Turnout		2,797	53.6	−2.0
Labour gain from Liberal Democrats		Swing	▲7.0	

=== St. Stephen ===
St. Stephen
Party	Candidate	Votes	%	±%
Labour	R. Round	1,484	63.0	+0.1
Conservative	M. Dean	473	20.1	−0.5
Liberal Democrats	M. Verran	267	11.3	−5.2
Independent	J. Phillips	131	5.6	N/A
Majority		1,011	42.9	+0.6
Turnout		2,355	43.6	−2.1
Labour hold		Swing	▲0.3	

=== Thorpe Hamlet ===
Thorpe Hamlet
Party	Candidate	Votes	%	±%
Liberal Democrats	D. Wood	1,139	51.7	−1.2
Labour	J. Lay	842	38.2	+5.5
Conservative	S. Butler	222	10.1	−6.4
Majority		297	13.5	−6.7
Turnout		2,203	37.7	−3.3
Liberal Democrats hold		Swing	▼3.4	

=== Town Close ===
Town Close
Party	Candidate	Votes	%	±%
Liberal Democrats	D. Wood	1,458	47.5	−2.4
Labour	M. Taskis	1,335	43.5	+2.5
Conservative	J. Wyatt	240	7.8	−1.4
Natural Law	D. Milis	34	1.1	N/A
Majority		123	4.0	−4.9
Turnout		3,067	55.3	−1.4
Liberal Democrats hold		Swing	▼2.5	

=== University ===
University
Party	Candidate	Votes	%	±%
Labour	A. Cains	1,324	47.9	+2.3
Liberal Democrats	D. Hume	1,245	45.0	±0.0
Conservative	C. Page	196	7.1	−2.3
Majority		79	2.9	+2.3
Turnout		2,765	50.1	−3.5
Labour hold		Swing	▲1.2	
