= 1973 Norwich City Council election =

1973 city council election for Norwich, England

The 1973 Norwich City Council election took place on 7 June 1973 to elect members of Norwich City Council in England. This was on the same day as other local elections. Voting took place across 16 wards, each electing 3 Councillors. Following the Local Government Act 1972, this was the first election to the new non-metropolitan district council for Norwich, which came into being on 1 April the following year. Labour took control of the Council after winning a comfortable majority of seats.

== Summary ==
=== Election result ===
1973 Norwich City Council election
Party	Seats	Gains	Losses	Net gain/loss	Seats %	Votes %	Votes	+/−
Labour	37	N/A	N/A	N/A	77.1	59.0	53,809	N/A
Conservative	11	N/A	N/A	N/A	22.9	34.2	31,202	N/A
Liberal	0	N/A	N/A	N/A	0.0	5.8	5,303	N/A
Democratic Labour	0	N/A	N/A	N/A	0.0	0.5	426	N/A
Independent	0	N/A	N/A	N/A	0.0	0.3	300	N/A
National Front	0	N/A	N/A	N/A	0.0	0.2	170	N/A
