= 2024 Norwich City Council election =

- 2 May 2024

13 out of 39 seats to Norwich City Council 20 seats needed for a majority

	First party	Second party
Leader	Mike Stonard	Lucy Galvin
Party	Labour	Green
Last election	23 seats, 42.7%	13 seats, 33.0%
Seats before	19	13
Seats won	6	6
Seats after	19	15
Seat change	Steady	▲2
Popular vote	14,588	11,600
Percentage	40.0%	31.8%
Swing	▼2.7%	▼1.2%
	Third party	Fourth party
Leader	James Wright	None
Party	Liberal Democrats	Independent
Last election	3 seats, 12.2%	0 seats, 0.0%
Seats before	3	4
Seats won	1	0
Seats after	3	2
Seat change	Steady	▼2
Popular vote	4,154	1,598
Percentage	11.4%	4.4%
Swing	▼0.8%	▲4.2%
- Winner of each seat at the 2024 Norwich City Council election
Leader before election
Mike Stonard
Labour
No overall control
Leader after election
Mike Stonard
Labour
No overall control

The 2024 Norwich City Council election took place on 2 May 2024 to elect members of Norwich City Council in Norfolk, England. This was on the same day as other local elections in England.

== Background ==
At the previous local elections in 2023, Labour retained its overall majority despite losing two seats to the Green Party. However, in November of that year four councillors resigned from the ruling Labour group, depriving the party of their majority for the first time in more than eleven years. As a result, the council fell into no overall control. Labour continued to run the council as a minority administration after the defections in November 2023.

== Summary ==
=== Changes in council composition ===
After the previous election in 2023 the composition of the council was:

↓
23	13	3
Lab	Grn	LD

Following changes of allegiance, prior to the 2024 election the composition of the council was:

↓
19	13	4	3
Lab	Grn	Ind	LD

Changes 2023–2024:

- November 2023: Karen Davis, Rachel Everett, Cate Oliver, and Ian Stutely leave Labour to sit as independents (Note: Sit as part of the Independent Norwich Group, which is not registered as a political party.)

=== Election result ===
The election saw the council remain under no overall control. Labour regained some of the seats it had lost to defections during the previous year, but lost seats to the Greens, leaving Labour's overall number of seats unchanged. The Labour minority administration continued to run the council after the election.

2024 Norwich City Council election
Party	This election			Full council			This election		
Party	Seats	Net	Seats %	Other	Total	Total %	Votes	Votes %	+/−
Labour	6	Steady	46.2	13	19	48.7	14,588	40.0	–2.7
Green	6	▲2	46.2	9	15	38.5	11,600	31.8	–1.2
Liberal Democrats	1	Steady	7.7	2	3	7.7	4,154	11.4	–0.8
Independent	0	▼2	0.0	2	2	5.1	1,598	4.4	+4.2
Conservative	0	Steady	0.0	0	0	0.0	3,754	10.3	–1.6
Reform	0	Steady	0.0	0	0	0.0	655	1.8	N/A
Communist	0	Steady	0.0	0	0	0.0	122	0.3	N/A

== Ward results ==
The Statement of Persons Nominated, which details the candidates standing in each ward, was released by Norwich City Council following the close of nominations on 8 April 2024.

=== Bowthorpe ===
Bowthorpe
Party	Candidate	Votes	%	±%
Labour	Sue Sands*	1,201	61.9	+1.3
Conservative	Rebeka Jones	342	17.6	+2.5
Green	Oliver Springate-Baginski	226	11.6	–0.5
Liberal Democrats	Sean Bennett	172	8.9	–3.3
Majority		859	44.3	–1.2
Turnout		1,941		
Labour hold		Swing	▼0.6	

=== Catton Grove ===
Catton Grove
Party	Candidate	Votes	%	±%
Labour Co-op	Mike Stonard*	1,178	53.5	–3.2
Conservative	Simon Jones	470	21.4	–0.3
Green	Tony Park	423	19.2	+4.0
Liberal Democrats	Ian Williams	129	5.9	–0.5
Majority		708	32.1	–2.9
Turnout		2,200		
Labour hold		Swing	▼1.5	

=== Crome ===
Crome
Party	Candidate	Votes	%	±%
Labour	Adam Giles*	1,260	53.3	–0.8
Conservative	Tod James	396	16.7	–6.3
Green	James Killbery	344	14.5	–2.1
Reform	Nick Taylor	260	11.0	N/A
Liberal Democrats	Nigel Lubbock	105	4.4	–1.9
Majority		864	36.6	+5.5
Turnout		2,365		
Labour hold		Swing	▲2.8	

=== Eaton ===
Eaton
Party	Candidate	Votes	%	±%
Liberal Democrats	James Wright*	2,207	54.1	±0.0
Labour	George Heaney	860	21.1	–1.2
Green	Jane Saunders	518	12.7	+0.5
Conservative	Iain Gwynn	496	12.2	+0.9
Majority		1,347	33.0	+1.2
Turnout		4,081		
Liberal Democrats hold		Swing	▼0.6	

=== Lakenham ===
Lakenham
Party	Candidate	Votes	%	±%
Labour	Carli Harper	1,433	58.2	+1.3
Green	Ell Folan	452	18.4	–1.4
Conservative	Robert Hammond	302	12.3	–1.6
Liberal Democrats	Carol Chilton	151	6.1	–3.3
Independent	Nicola Aldous	124	5.0	N/A
Majority		981	39.8	+2.7
Turnout		2,462		
Labour gain from Independent		Swing	▲1.4	

=== Mancroft ===
Mancroft
Party	Candidate	Votes	%	±%
Green	Martin Schmierer*	1,579	61.8	+0.5
Labour	Stuart McLaren	675	26.4	±0.0
Conservative	Jane Fisher	211	8.3	–0.9
Liberal Democrats	Alan Wright	88	3.4	+0.3
Majority		904	35.4	+0.5
Turnout		2,553		
Green hold		Swing	▲0.3	

=== Mile Cross ===
Mile Cross
Party	Candidate	Votes	%	±%
Green	Charlie Caine	1,016	42.7	+11.6
Labour	Jasper Haywood	948	39.9	–8.0
Reform	Stephen Bailey	153	6.4	N/A
Conservative	Edita Szabo	145	6.1	–6.5
Liberal Democrats	Neil Hardman	74	3.1	–2.7
Independent	Matty Watson	42	1.8	N/A
Majority		68	2.8	N/A
Turnout		2,378		
Green gain from Labour		Swing	▲9.8	

=== Nelson ===
Nelson
Party	Candidate	Votes	%	±%
Green	Lucy Galvin*	2,205	57.0	–0.3
Labour	Michael Howard	1,260	32.5	–0.7
Conservative	John Fisher	159	4.1	–1.2
Liberal Democrats	Philip Jimenez	125	3.2	–0.9
Communist	Ben Clarke	122	3.2	N/A
Majority		945	24.5	+0.4
Turnout		3,871		
Green hold		Swing	▲0.2	

=== Sewell ===
Sewell
Party	Candidate	Votes	%	±%
Green	Gary Champion*	1,667	58.4	+3.2
Labour	Paul Guille	878	30.8	–5.3
Conservative	Georgi Dimitrov	128	4.5	–1.8
Reform	Carl Hicks	105	3.7	N/A
Liberal Democrats	Helen Arundell	75	2.6	+0.2
Majority		789	27.6	+8.5
Turnout		2,853	36.6	−2.6
Registered electors		7,799		
Green hold		Swing	▲4.3	

=== Thorpe Hamlet ===
Thorpe Hamlet
Party	Candidate	Votes	%	±%
Green	Ash Haynes*	1,288	44.7	–4.1
Labour	Jane Overhill	1,142	39.6	+5.4
Conservative	Alice Burt	332	11.5	±0.0
Liberal Democrats	Jeremy Hooke	121	4.2	–1.2
Majority		146	5.1	–9.5
Turnout		2,883	35.8	–1.5
Registered electors		8,042		
Green hold		Swing	▼4.8	

=== Town Close ===
Town Close
Party	Candidate	Votes	%	±%
Labour	Chris Smith	1,481	41.8	–13.5
Independent	Ian Stutely*	1,432	40.4	N/A
Conservative	Mary Chacksfield	445	12.5	–3.9
Liberal Democrats	David Fairbairn	188	5.3	–2.0
Majority		49	1.4	–32.9
Turnout		3,546		
Labour gain from Independent				

=== University ===
University
Party	Candidate	Votes	%	±%
Labour Co-op	Emma Hampton*	1,212	48.4	–2.2
Liberal Democrats	James Hawketts	637	25.4	+3.9
Green	Sean Gough	487	19.4	–1.2
Conservative	Cody Butler	170	6.8	–0.5
Majority		575	23.0	–6.1
Turnout		2,506		
Labour Co-op hold		Swing	▼3.1	

=== Wensum ===
Wensum
Party	Candidate	Votes	%	±%
Green	Toby Bolton	1,395	49.3	+4.3
Labour Co-op	Martin Peek*	1,060	37.4	–6.8
Conservative	John Ward	158	5.6	–2.4
Reform	Eric Masters	137	4.8	N/A
Liberal Democrats	Gordon Dean	82	2.9	+0.1
Majority		335	11.9	+11.1
Turnout		2,832		
Green gain from Labour Co-op		Swing	▲5.6	

== By-elections ==
=== Bowthorpe ===
Bowthorpe by-election: 1 May 2025
Party	Candidate	Votes	%	±%
Labour	Richard Lawes	689	31.5	–30.4
Reform	Nick Taylor	688	31.4	N/A
Green	Tony Park	430	19.6	+8.0
Conservative	Anthony Little	281	12.8	–4.8
Liberal Democrats	Sean Bennett	102	4.7	–4.2
Majority		1	0.1	–44.2
Turnout		2,190		
Labour hold				

=== Mancroft ===
Mancroft by-election: 1 May 2025
Party	Candidate	Votes	%	±%
Green	Ian Stutely	1,087	54.6	–7.2
Reform	Craig Baker	381	19.1	N/A
Labour	George Heaney	312	15.7	–10.7
Conservative	Edith Jones	106	5.3	–3.0
Liberal Democrats	Gordon Dean	105	5.3	+1.9
Majority		706	35.5	+0.1
Turnout		1,991		
Green hold				

=== Sewell ===
Sewell by-election: 1 May 2025
Party	Candidate	Votes	%	±%
Green	Jenny Knight	1,280	54.0	–4.4
Labour	Paul Guille	525	22.2	–8.6
Reform	Valerie Brind	367	15.5	+11.8
Liberal Democrats	Marlowe North	99	4.2	+1.6
Conservative	Simon Jones	85	3.6	–0.9
Independent	His Excellency Freeman	13	0.5	N/A
Majority		755	31.8	+4.2
Turnout		2,369		
Green hold		Swing	▲2.1	
