= 2002 Norwich City Council election =

2002 UK local government election

The 2002 Norwich City Council election took place on 2 May 2002 to elect members of Norwich City Council in England. This was on the same day as other local elections. 16 of 48 seats (one-third) were up for election, with an additional seat up in Henderson ward due to a by-election.

== Results summary ==
2002 Norwich City Council election
Party	This election			Full council			This election		
Party	Seats	Net	Seats %	Other	Total	Total %	Votes	Votes %	+/−
Liberal Democrats	10	▲5	58.8	15	26	54.2	15,786	44.1	+1.8
Labour	5	▼7	29.4	16	19	39.6	11,900	33.2	+3.0
Green	2	▲2	11.8	0	2	4.1	3,365	9.4	+4.1
Conservative	0	Steady	0.0	1	1	2.0	4,503	12.6	-8.4
Independent	0	Steady	0.0	0	0	0.0	192	0.5	-0.6
Socialist Alternative	0	Steady	0.0	0	0	0.0	56	0.2	N/A

== Ward results ==
=== Bowthorpe ===
Bowthorpe
Party	Candidate	Votes	%	±%
Labour	J. Garrett	1,132	48.7	+10.4
Liberal Democrats	H. Arundell	731	31.5	−1.4
Conservative	J. Virgo	348	15.0	−5.5
Green	R. Chittenden	113	4.9	+0.4
Majority		401	17.3	+11.9
Turnout		2,324	26.6	−4.4
Labour hold		Swing	▲5.9	

=== Catton Grove ===
Catton Grove
Party	Candidate	Votes	%	±%
Labour	R. Quinn	706	42.8	+5.1
Conservative	C. Barker	473	28.7	−2.0
Liberal Democrats	N. Langham	387	23.5	+1.0
Green	J. Bearman	82	5.0	+0.4
Majority		233	14.1	+7.1
Turnout		1,648	30.0	−1.8
Labour hold		Swing	▲3.6	

=== Coslany ===
Coslany
Party	Candidate	Votes	%	±%
Labour	M. Banham	819	42.2	−0.8
Liberal Democrats	P. Kendrick	596	30.7	+12.3
Conservative	E. Horth	385	19.9	−11.8
Green	Adrian Holmes	139	7.2	+0.3
Majority		223	11.5	+0.2
Turnout		1,939	32.5	+8.3
Labour hold		Swing	▼6.6	

=== Crome ===
Crome
Party	Candidate	Votes	%	±%
Labour	D. Bradford	955	51.0	+11.5
Conservative	A. Lovewell	471	25.1	−14.6
Liberal Democrats	A. Strong	404	21.6	+2.7
Green	R. House	43	2.3	+0.4
Majority		484	25.8	—
Turnout		1,873	35.4	+7.6
Labour hold		Swing	▲13.1	

=== Eaton ===
Eaton
Party	Candidate	Votes	%	±%
Liberal Democrats	I. Couzens	2,143	62.6	+4.6
Conservative	I. Mackie	855	25.0	−7.2
Labour	C. Slorach	350	10.2	+2.2
Green	N. Bartlett	77	2.2	+0.4
Majority		1,288	37.6	+11.8
Turnout		3,425	53.9	+4.0
Liberal Democrats hold		Swing	▲5.9	

=== Heigham ===
Heigham
Party	Candidate	Votes	%	±%
Liberal Democrats	D. Castle-Green	1,042	50.8	−4.2
Labour	M. Graham	720	35.1	+4.5
Conservative	A. Holt	149	7.3	−1.9
Green	M. Farrington	110	5.4	+0.2
Socialist Alternative	A. Cairns	29	1.4	N/A
Majority		322	15.7	−8.7
Turnout		2,050	35.9	+6.5
Liberal Democrats gain from Labour		Swing	▼4.4	

=== Henderson ===
Henderson
Party	Candidate	Votes	%	±%
Green	S. Land	857	41.4	+25.9
Green	S. Ronneke	778		
Labour	R. Blower	630	30.4	−11.1
Labour	J. Westmacott	535		
Liberal Democrats	J. Toomey	464	22.4	−0.3
Liberal Democrats	A. Stairs	446		
Conservative	F. Leatherdale	120	5.8	−14.6
Conservative	C. Page	108		
Turnout			37.0	+17.3
Green gain from Labour				
Green gain from Labour				

=== Lakenham ===
Lakenham
Party	Candidate	Votes	%	±%
Liberal Democrats	C. Harper	1,017	49.1	+1.0
Labour	K. Ratcliffe	789	38.1	+0.7
Conservative	R. Wells	298	9.2	−3.0
Green	M. Milner	76	3.7	+1.3
Majority		228	11.0	+0.3
Turnout		2,180	37.0	+7.1
Liberal Democrats gain from Labour		Swing	▲0.2	

=== Mancroft ===
Mancroft
Party	Candidate	Votes	%	±%
Liberal Democrats	S. Nobbs	1,005	41.7	+2.7
Labour	D. Fullman	948	39.3	+7.2
Conservative	R. Wells	298	12.4	−10.8
Green	J. Cox	159	6.6	+2.5
Majority		57	2.4	−4.6
Turnout		2,410	33.7	+5.8
Liberal Democrats gain from Labour		Swing	▼2.3	

=== Mile Cross ===
Mile Cross
Party	Candidate	Votes	%	±%
Labour	R. Taylor	835	48.5	+3.8
Liberal Democrats	V. Elvin	813	47.2	+14.7
Green	J. Parkhouse	73	4.2	+0.9
Majority		22	1.3	−10.9
Turnout		1,721	31.9	+15.8
Labour hold		Swing	▼5.5	

=== Mousehold ===
Mousehold
Party	Candidate	Votes	%	±%
Liberal Democrats	V. Hopkins	798	39.4	−7.7
Labour	N. Williams	791	39.1	+9.1
Independent	P. Scruton	192	9.5	N/A
Conservative	D. Roberts	147	7.3	−7.9
Green	L. Freaney	69	3.4	−1.4
Socialist Alternative	E. Manningham	27	1.3	N/A
Majority		7	0.3	−16.8
Turnout		2,024	32.7	+9.9
Liberal Democrats gain from Labour		Swing	▼8.4	

=== Nelson ===
Nelson
Party	Candidate	Votes	%	±%
Liberal Democrats	G. Dean	1,115	52.1	+3.7
Labour	J. Lay	575	26.9	−5.7
Green	Rupert Read	308	14.4	+4.2
Conservative	V. Hopes	143	6.7	−2.1
Majority		540	25.2	+9.4
Turnout		2,141	38.0	+4.6
Liberal Democrats hold		Swing	▲4.7	

=== St. Stephen ===
St. Stephen
Party	Candidate	Votes	%	±%
Liberal Democrats	A. Pond	1,229	51.4	+10.0
Labour	C. Morrey	713	29.8	−1.5
Conservative	T. Ivory	300	12.5	−9.0
Green	S. Little	149	6.2	+2.4
Majority		516	21.6	+11.5
Turnout		2,391	42.0	+3.9
Liberal Democrats gain from Labour		Swing	▲5.8	

=== Thorpe Hamlet ===
Thorpe Hamlet
Party	Candidate	Votes	%	±%
Liberal Democrats	J. Surridge	1,072	61.1	+8.1
Labour	J. Martin	394	22.5	−0.2
Conservative	L. Batchelor	152	8.7	−6.3
Green	M. Charnley	137	7.8	−1.4
Majority		678	38.6	+8.3
Turnout		1,755	27.7	+5.9
Liberal Democrats hold		Swing	▲4.2	

=== Town Close ===
Town Close
Party	Candidate	Votes	%	±%
Liberal Democrats	F. Hartley	1,276	60.4	+4.5
Labour	K. Brown	544	25.7	+3.5
Conservative	J. Wyatt	206	9.7	−7.2
Green	C. Webb	88	4.2	−0.3
Majority		732	34.6	+0.9
Turnout		2,114	39.2	+7.6
Liberal Democrats hold		Swing	▲0.5	

=== University ===
University
Party	Candidate	Votes	%	±%
Liberal Democrats	J. Rooza	1,228	62.7	+3.3
Labour	J. Bremner	464	23.7	+3.7
Conservative	T. Matthews	158	8.1	−2.7
Green	J. Todd	107	5.5	−4.3
Majority		764	39.0	−0.4
Turnout		1,957	35.8	+5.2
Liberal Democrats hold		Swing	▼0.2	
