= 1998 Norwich City Council election =

1998 UK local government election

The 1998 Norwich City Council Election took place on 7 May 1998 to elect members of Norwich City Council in England. This was on the same day as other local elections. 16 of 48 seats (one-third) were up for election, with two additional seats up in Catton Grove and University wards due to by-elections.

== Results summary ==
1998 Norwich City Council election
Party	This election			Full council			This election		
Party	Seats	Net	Seats %	Other	Total	Total %	Votes	Votes %	+/−
Labour	12	▼2	66.7	23	35	72.9	12,774	44.0	-9.3
Liberal Democrats	6	▲2	33.3	7	13	27.1	10,837	37.3	+8.4
Conservative	0	Steady	0.0	0	0	0.0	5,040	17.4	+2.4
Independent Labour	0	Steady	0.0	0	0	0.0	181	0.6	New
Green	0	Steady	0.0	0	0	0.0	118	0.4	-1.9
Independent	0	Steady	0.0	0	0	0.0	71	0.2	-0.3

== Ward results ==
=== Bowthorpe ===
Bowthorpe
Party	Candidate	Votes	%	±%
Labour	D. Underwood	976	62.8	−6.6
Liberal Democrats	N. Lubbock	330	21.2	+7.7
Conservative	L. Bagshaw	248	16.0	+4.4
Majority		646	41.6	−14.3
Turnout		1,554	18.6	−5.7
Labour hold		Swing	▼7.2	

=== Catton Grove ===
Catton Grove (2 seats due to by-election)
Party	Candidate	Votes	%	±%
Labour	R. Quinn	595	51.1	−11.9
Labour	B. Smith	486		
Conservative	P. Kearney	264	22.7	+1.4
Liberal Democrats	S. Richardson	234	20.1	+4.4
Liberal Democrats	J. Kendrick	218		
Independent	D. Tungate	71	6.1	N/A
Turnout			34.8	
Labour hold				
Labour hold				

=== Coslany ===
Coslany
Party	Candidate	Votes	%	±%
Labour	M. Pendred	854	58.9	−3.7
Conservative	E. Horth	304	21.0	+4.1
Liberal Democrats	P. Young	293	20.2	−0.3
Majority		550	37.9	—
Turnout		1,451	24.7	−5.2
Labour hold		Swing	▼3.9	

=== Crome ===
Crome
Party	Candidate	Votes	%	±%
Labour	D. Bradford	879	59.9	−0.1
Conservative	J. Fisher	322	21.9	−1.8
Liberal Democrats	P. Kendrick	266	18.1	+1.8
Majority		557	38.0	+1.7
Turnout		1,467	27.1	−8.4
Labour hold		Swing	▲0.9	

=== Eaton ===
Eaton
Party	Candidate	Votes	%	±%
Liberal Democrats	I. Couzens	1,605	48.8	+4.2
Conservative	J. Virgo	1,292	39.2	+6.1
Labour	C. Slorach	395	12.0	−10.3
Majority		313	9.6	−1.9
Turnout		2,392	51.3	−1.3
Liberal Democrats hold		Swing	▼1.9	

=== Heigham ===
Heigham
Party	Candidate	Votes	%	±%
Labour	M. Graham	726	50.6	−18.1
Liberal Democrats	M. Verran	462	32.2	+12.3
Conservative	B. Orme	130	9.1	−2.3
Green	I. Harris	118	8.2	N/A
Majority		264	18.4	−30.4
Turnout		1,436	25.9	−4.5
Labour hold		Swing	▼15.2	

=== Henderson ===
Henderson
Party	Candidate	Votes	%	±%
Labour	A. Jones	712	62.4	−1.7
Liberal Democrats	P. Meacock	292	25.6	+8.6
Conservative	G. Drake	137	12.0	+3.0
Majority		357	36.8	−10.4
Turnout		1,141	20.4	−8.5
Labour hold		Swing	▼5.2	

=== Lakenham ===
Lakenham
Party	Candidate	Votes	%	±%
Labour	K. Ratcliffe	822	56.8	−11.0
Liberal Democrats	Y. Barnes	391	27.0	+11.0
Conservative	S. Collier	233	16.1	−0.1
Majority		431	29.8	−21.8
Turnout		1,446	26.7	−7.0
Labour hold		Swing	▼11.0	

=== Mancroft ===
Mancroft
Party	Candidate	Votes	%	±%
Labour	D. Fullman	845	55.4	−2.0
Conservative	J. Knight	351	23.0	+2.4
Liberal Democrats	C. Risebrook	330	21.6	+8.1
Majority		494	32.4	−4.4
Turnout		1,526	23.7	−7.4
Labour hold		Swing	▼2.2	

=== Mile Cross ===
Mile Cross
Party	Candidate	Votes	%	±%
Labour	M. Reilly	515	55.7	−23.4
Independent Labour	K. Wyer	181	19.6	N/A
Liberal Democrats	I. Kendrick	114	12.3	−0.6
Conservative	G. Smith	114	12.3	+4.3
Majority		334	36.1	−30.1
Turnout		924	17.7	−5.9
Labour hold		Swing	▼21.5	

=== Mousehold ===
Mousehold
Party	Candidate	Votes	%	±%
Labour	N. Williams	780	63.4	−2.4
Liberal Democrats	J. Lloyd	253	20.6	+4.2
Conservative	E. Collishaw	198	16.1	+4.0
Majority		527	42.8	−6.5
Turnout		1,231	20.8	−7.3
Labour hold		Swing	▼3.3	

=== Nelson ===
Nelson
Party	Candidate	Votes	%	±%
Liberal Democrats	P. Boulton	993	53.3	+18.7
Labour	J. Verran	732	39.3	−8.9
Conservative	J. Turner	138	7.4	+1.2
Majority		261	14.0	—
Turnout		1,863	34.9	−15.6
Liberal Democrats hold		Swing	▲13.8	

=== St. Stephen ===
St. Stephen
Party	Candidate	Votes	%	±%
Labour	J. Swainson	914	48.7	−6.6
Conservative	G. Russell	623	33.2	+12.6
Liberal Democrats	D. Woolterton	341	18.2	+3.7
Majority		291	15.5	—
Turnout		1,878	34.4	−1.5
Labour hold		Swing	▼9.6	

=== Thorpe Hamlet ===
Thorpe Hamlet
Party	Candidate	Votes	%	±%
Liberal Democrats	J. Edwards	936	50.9	−4.3
Labour	A. Pearmain	728	39.6	+6.5
Conservative	M. Dewings	175	9.5	−2.2
Majority		208	11.3	—
Turnout		1,839	32.0	+3.5
Liberal Democrats hold		Swing	▼5.4	

=== Town Close ===
Town Close
Party	Candidate	Votes	%	±%
Liberal Democrats	F. Hartley	1,241	59.6	+6.4
Labour	J. Fowler	637	30.6	−8.1
Conservative	J .Wyatt	204	9.8	+2.6
Majority		604	29.0	+14.5
Turnout		2,082	38.8	−13.6
Liberal Democrats hold		Swing	▲7.3	

=== University ===
University (2 seats up due to by-election)
Party	Candidate	Votes	%	±%
Liberal Democrats	J. Rooza	1,313	63.6	+13.0
Liberal Democrats	I. Williams	1,225		
Labour	A. Thorpe	593	28.7	−14.0
Labour	S. Salih	585		
Conservative	C. Page	157	7.6	+0.9
Conservative	L. Foster	150		
Turnout			36.6	−11.4
Liberal Democrats gain from Labour				
Liberal Democrats gain from Labour				
