= 1991 Norwich City Council election =

UK local election

The 1991 Norwich City Council election took place on 2 May 1991 to elect members of Norwich City Council in England. This was on the same day as other local elections. 16 of 48 seats (one-third) were up for election, with one additional seat up due to a by-election in Catton Grove ward.

== Result summary ==
1991 Norwich City Council election
Party	This election			Full council			This election		
Party	Seats	Net	Seats %	Other	Total	Total %	Votes	Votes %	+/−
Labour	13	0	75.0	23	38	79.2	21,143	47.2	-7.9
Liberal Democrats	3	0	18.8	4	7	14.6	12,718	28.4	+8.4
Conservative	1	0	6.3	2	3	6.3	9,136	20.4	+3.2
Green	0	0	0.0	0	0	0.0	1,836	4.1	-3.3

== Ward results ==
=== Bowthorpe ===
Bowthorpe
Party	Candidate	Votes	%	±%
Labour	T. Gordon	1,661	58.6	
Conservative	J. Knight	676	23.0	
Liberal Democrats	N. Lubbock	597	20.3	
Majority		985	33.6	
Turnout		2,934	39.5	
Labour hold		Swing		

=== Catton Grove ===
Catton Grove (2 seats due to by-election)
Party	Candidate	Votes	%	±%
Labour	D. Hook	1,208	50.1	
Labour	R. Quinn	1,143		
Conservative	P. Kearney	776	32.2	
Conservative	M. Slattery	630		
Liberal Democrats	R. Richardson	425	17.6	
Turnout			39.0	
Labour hold				
Labour hold				

=== Coslany ===
Coslany
Party	Candidate	Votes	%	±%
Labour	H. Watson	1,493	54.9	
Liberal Democrats	H. Tidman	563	20.7	
Conservative	R. Knowles	533	19.6	
Green	J. Crampton	130	4.8	
Majority		930	34.2	
Turnout		2,719	44.2	
Labour hold		Swing		

=== Crome ===
Crome
Party	Candidate	Votes	%	±%
Labour	B. Simpson	1,410	57.9	
Liberal Democrats	D. Williment	559	22.9	
Conservative	A. Lumbard	468	19.2	
Majority		851	34.9	
Turnout		2,437	42.7	
Labour hold		Swing		

=== Eaton ===
Eaton
Party	Candidate	Votes	%	±%
Conservative	J. Virgo	2,063	54.8	
Labour	N. Romeril	839	22.3	
Liberal Democrats	J. Lubbock	721	19.2	
Green	J. Peacock	140	3.7	
Majority		1,224	32.5	
Turnout		3,763	57.3	
Conservative hold		Swing		

=== Heigham ===
Heigham
Party	Candidate	Votes	%	±%
Labour	C. Semmens	1,204	49.4	
Liberal Democrats	A. Dunthorne	768	31.5	
Conservative	P. Hipwell	367	15.1	
Green	J. White	97	4.0	
Majority		436	17.9	
Turnout		2,436	42.5	
Labour hold		Swing		

=== Henderson ===
Henderson
Party	Candidate	Votes	%	±%
Labour	J. Newman	1,248	53.1	
Liberal Democrats	D. Elgood	464	19.7	
Conservative	A. Daws	358	15.2	
Green	D. Carlo	282	12.0	
Majority		784	33.3	
Turnout		2,352	44.2	
Labour hold		Swing		

=== Lakenham ===
Lakenham
Party	Candidate	Votes	%	±%
Labour	M. Chapman	1,474	57.7	
Conservative	E. Cooper	532	20.8	
Liberal Democrats	A. Thomas	405	15.8	
Green	L. Bleach	145	5.7	
Majority		942	36.9	
Turnout		2,556	44.2	
Labour hold		Swing		

=== Mancroft ===
Mancroft
Party	Candidate	Votes	%	±%
Labour	E. Burgess	1,249	50.5	
Conservative	E. Horth	686	27.7	
Liberal Democrats	C. Scrivener	426	17.2	
Green	T. Tigger	112	4.5	
Majority		563	22.8	
Turnout		2,473	39.8	
Labour hold		Swing		

=== Mile Cross ===
Mile Cross
Party	Candidate	Votes	%	±%
Labour	J. Bunker	1,468	69.4	
Conservative	D. Roberts	309	14.6	
Liberal Democrats	K. Moss	265	12.5	
Green	D. Mackellar	74	3.5	
Majority		1,159	54.8	
Turnout		2,116	37.8	
Labour hold		Swing		

=== Mousehold ===
Mousehold
Party	Candidate	Votes	%	±%
Labour	V. Morton	1,424	59.6	
Conservative	I. Evans	436	18.3	
Liberal Democrats	M. Quinn	386	16.2	
Green	M. Simon	142	5.9	
Majority		988	41.4	
Turnout		2,388	37.9	
Labour hold		Swing		

=== Nelson ===
Nelson
Party	Candidate	Votes	%	±%
Liberal Democrats	N. Butt	1,280	43.4	
Labour	C. Francis	1,173	39.8	
Conservative	S. Mogford	340	11.5	
Green	R. Eris	155	5.3	
Majority		107	3.6	
Turnout		2,948	58.8	
Liberal Democrats hold		Swing		

=== St. Stephen ===
St. Stephen
Party	Candidate	Votes	%	±%
Labour	R. Round	1,368	54.1	
Liberal Democrats	A. De Findlow	925	36.6	
Green	J. Yarrow	236	9.3	
Majority		443	17.5	
Turnout		2,529	47.0	
Labour hold		Swing		

=== Thorpe Hamlet ===
Thorpe Hamlet
Party	Candidate	Votes	%	±%
Liberal Democrats	C. Moore	1,602	59.9	
Labour	A. Birmingham	605	22.6	
Conservative	C. Page	318	11.9	
Green	L. Betts	151	5.6	
Majority		997	37.3	
Turnout		2,676	46.6	
Liberal Democrats hold		Swing		

=== Town Close ===
Town Close
Party	Candidate	Votes	%	±%
Liberal Democrats	B. Watkins	1,974	57.0	
Labour	F. Mellow	1,070	30.9	
Conservative	R. Larner	339	9.8	
Green	A. Holmes	81	2.3	
Majority		904	26.1	
Turnout		3,464	61.8	
Liberal Democrats hold		Swing		

=== University ===
University
Party	Candidate	Votes	%	±%
Liberal Democrats	D. Hume	1,358	47.5	
Labour	G. Gee	1,106	38.7	
Conservative	J. Chitsiga	305	10.7	
Green	J. Green	91	3.2	
Majority		252	8.8	
Turnout		2,860	57.4	
Liberal Democrats hold		Swing		
