= 1999 Norwich City Council election =

UK local election

The 1999 Norwich City Council election took place on 6 May 1999 to elect members of Norwich City Council in England. This was on the same day as other local elections. 16 of 48 seats (one-third) were up for election, with an additional seat up in Coslany ward due to a by-election.

== Results summary ==
1999 Norwich City Council election
Party	This election			Full council			This election		
Party	Seats	Net	Seats %	Other	Total	Total %	Votes	Votes %	+/−
Labour	11	▼2	64.7	22	33	68.8	11,206	39.3	-4.7
Liberal Democrats	6	▲2	35.3	9	15	31.3	10,665	37.4	+0.1
Conservative	0	Steady	0.0	0	0	0.0	5,489	19.3	+1.9
Green	0	Steady	0.0	0	0	0.0	756	2.7	+2.3
Independent	0	Steady	0.0	0	0	0.0	344	1.2	+1.0
Natural Law	0	Steady	0.0	0	0	0.0	21	0.1	New

== Ward results ==
=== Bowthorpe ===
Bowthorpe
Party	Candidate	Votes	%	±%
Labour	R. Borrett	890	57.8	−5.0
Liberal Democrats	N. Lubbock	375	24.4	+3.2
Conservative	G. Drake	274	17.8	+1.8
Majority		515	33.4	−8.2
Turnout		1,539	18.3	−0.3
Labour hold		Swing	▼4.1	

=== Catton Grove ===
Catton Grove
Party	Candidate	Votes	%	±%
Labour	B. Smith	565	50.4	−0.7
Conservative	P. Kearney	276	24.6	+1.9
Liberal Democrats	S. Richardson	200	17.8	−2.3
Green	B. Matthews	42	3.7	N/A
Independent	D. Tungate	38	3.4	−2.7
Majority		289	25.8	—
Turnout		1,121	21.1	−13.7
Labour hold		Swing	▼1.3	

=== Coslany ===
Coslany (2 seats due to by-election)
Party	Candidate	Votes	%	±%
Labour	H. Watson	780	46.0	−12.9
Labour	R. Britt	746		
Conservative	E. Collishaw	746	24.1	+3.1
Conservative	E. Horth	398		
Liberal Democrats	P. Kendrick	253	14.9	−5.3
Liberal Democrats	T. Wells	247		
Green	A. Holmes	172	10.1	N/A
Independent	M. Pryce	83	4.9	N/A
Turnout			28.8	+4.1
Labour hold				
Labour hold				

=== Crome ===
Crome
Party	Candidate	Votes	%	±%
Labour	B. Simpson	767	49.1	−10.8
Conservative	I. Lovewell	483	30.9	+9.0
Liberal Democrats	N. Langham	313	20.0	+1.9
Majority		284	18.2	−19.8
Turnout		1,563	29.1	+2.0
Labour hold		Swing	▼9.9	

=== Eaton ===
Eaton
Party	Candidate	Votes	%	±%
Liberal Democrats	J. Lubbock	1,904	55.4	+6.6
Conservative	J. Virgo	1,169	34.0	−5.2
Labour	C. Knapp	361	10.5	−1.5
Majority		735	21.4	+11.9
Turnout		3,434	53.7	+2.4
Liberal Democrats hold		Swing	▲5.9	

=== Heigham ===
Heigham
Party	Candidate	Votes	%	±%
Liberal Democrats	M. Verran	827	48.6	+16.4
Labour	C. Semmens	660	38.8	−11.8
Conservative	B. Wells	129	7.6	−1.5
Green	I. Harris	84	4.9	−3.3
Majority		167	9.8	N/A
Turnout		1,700	30.7	+4.8
Liberal Democrats gain from Labour		Swing	▲14.1	

=== Henderson ===
Henderson
Party	Candidate	Votes	%	±%
Labour	J. Cummins	620	54.0	−8.4
Liberal Democrats	P. Meacock	221	19.2	−6.4
Green	M. Valentine	158	13.8	N/A
Conservative	V. Hopes	150	13.1	+1.1
Majority		399	34.8	−2.0
Turnout		1,149	20.4	±0.0
Labour hold		Swing	▼1.0	

=== Lakenham ===
Lakenham
Party	Candidate	Votes	%	±%
Labour	A. Pearmain	724	49.0	−7.8
Liberal Democrats	L. Harper	391	26.5	−0.5
Conservative	R. Wells	297	20.1	+4.0
Independent	J. Crome	65	4.4	N/A
Majority		333	22.5	−7.3
Turnout		1,477	27.9	+1.2
Labour hold		Swing	▼3.7	

=== Mancroft ===
Mancroft
Party	Candidate	Votes	%	±%
Labour	E. Burgess	716	43.9	−11.5
Conservative	J. Knight	445	27.3	+4.3
Liberal Democrats	C. Risebrook	331	20.3	−1.3
Green	T. Tigger	77	4.7	N/A
Independent	J. Girling	63	3.9	N/A
Majority		271	16.6	−15.8
Turnout		1,632	25.6	+1.9
Labour hold		Swing	▲7.9	

=== Mile Cross ===
Mile Cross
Party	Candidate	Votes	%	±%
Labour	J. Bunker	543	59.0	+3.3
Liberal Democrats	I. Kendrick	197	21.4	+9.1
Conservative	G. Smith	180	19.6	+7.3
Majority		346	37.6	+5.2
Turnout		920	17.7	±0.0
Labour hold		Swing	▼2.9	

=== Mousehold ===
Mousehold
Party	Candidate	Votes	%	±%
Labour	T. Gordon	620	45.6	−17.8
Liberal Democrats	P. Young	465	34.2	+13.6
Conservative	J. Fisher	199	14.6	−1.5
Green	L. Moore	75	5.5	N/A
Majority		155	11.4	−31.4
Turnout		1,359	22.6	+1.8
Labour hold		Swing	▼15.7	

=== Nelson ===
Nelson
Party	Candidate	Votes	%	±%
Liberal Democrats	P. McAlenan	1,217	55.9	+2.6
Labour	S. Morphew	846	38.8	−0.5
Conservative	S. Turner	115	5.3	−2.1
Majority		371	17.1	+3.1
Turnout		2,178	39.5	+4.6
Liberal Democrats gain from Labour		Swing	▲1.6	

=== St. Stephen ===
St. Stephen
Party	Candidate	Votes	%	±%
Labour	R. Round	819	46.2	−2.5
Conservative	G. Williams	453	25.6	−7.6
Liberal Democrats	C. Southgate	346	19.5	+1.3
Green	N. Bartlett	86	4.9	N/A
Independent	T. Smith	53	3.0	N/A
Independent	T. Day	15	0.8	N/A
Majority		366	20.7	+5.2
Turnout		1,772	32.7	−1.7
Labour hold		Swing	▲2.6	

=== Thorpe Hamlet ===
Thorpe Hamlet
Party	Candidate	Votes	%	±%
Liberal Democrats	T. Turner	878	58.6	+7.7
Labour	R. Taylor	463	30.9	−8.7
Conservative	M. Dewings	157	10.5	+1.0
Majority		415	27.7	+12.2
Turnout		1,498	26.4	−5.6
Liberal Democrats hold		Swing	▲8.2	

=== Town Close ===
Town Close
Party	Candidate	Votes	%	±%
Liberal Democrats	D. Wood	1,277	62.4	+2.8
Labour	M. Taskis	504	24.6	−6.0
Conservative	J. Wyatt	216	10.6	+0.8
Independent	J. Coats	27	1.3	N/A
Natural Law	D. Mills	21	1.0	N/A
Majority		773	37.8	+8.8
Turnout		2,045	36.8	−2.0
Liberal Democrats hold		Swing	▲4.4	

=== University ===
University
Party	Candidate	Votes	%	±%
Liberal Democrats	I. Williams	1,223	61.0	−2.6
Labour	I. Woodall	582	29.0	+0.3
Conservative	C. Page	139	6.9	−0.7
Green	V. Bartlett	62	3.1	N/A
Majority		641	32.0	—
Turnout		2,006	36.8	+0.2
Liberal Democrats hold		Swing	▼1.5	
