= 2000 Norwich City Council election =

2000 UK local government election

The 2000 Norwich City Council election took place on 4 May 2000 to elect members of Norwich City Council in England. This was on the same day as other local elections. 16 of 48 seats (one-third) were up for election.

== Results summary ==
2000 Norwich City Council election
Party	This election			Full council			This election		
Party	Seats	Net	Seats %	Other	Total	Total %	Votes	Votes %	+/−
Labour	5	▼7	31.3	21	26	54.2	8,322	30.2	-9.1
Liberal Democrats	10	▲6	62.5	11	21	43.8	11,638	42.3	+4.9
Conservative	1	▲1	6.3	0	1	2.1	5,787	21.0	+1.7
Green	0	Steady	0.0	0	0	0.0	1,472	5.3	+2.6
Independent	0	Steady	0.0	0	0	0.0	290	1.1	-0.1
Natural Law	0	Steady	0.0	0	0	0.0	9	<0.1	-0.1

== Ward results ==
=== Bowthorpe ===
Bowthorpe
Party	Candidate	Votes	%	±%
Labour	B. Ferris	1,009	38.3	−19.5
Liberal Democrats	A. Barber	867	32.9	+8.5
Conservative	K. Howlett	539	20.5	+2.7
Green	S. Ronneke	119	4.5	N/A
Independent	H. Robertson	100	3.8	N/A
Majority		142	5.4	−28.1
Turnout		2,634	31.0	+12.7
Labour hold		Swing	▼14.0	

=== Catton Grove ===
Catton Grove
Party	Candidate	Votes	%	±%
Labour	B. Morrey	643	37.7	−12.7
Conservative	P. Kearney	524	30.7	+6.1
Liberal Democrats	P. Kendrick	383	22.5	+4.7
Green	B. Matthews	78	4.6	+0.9
Independent	T. Smith	78	4.6	N/A
Majority		119	7.0	−18.8
Turnout		1,706	31.8	+10.7
Labour hold		Swing	▼9.4	

=== Coslany ===
Coslany
Party	Candidate	Votes	%	±%
Labour	R. Britt	606	43.0	−3.0
Conservative	E. Collishaw	447	31.7	+7.6
Liberal Democrats	C. Risebrook	260	18.4	+3.5
Green	Rupert Read	97	6.9	−3.2
Majority		159	11.3	—
Turnout		1,410	24.2	−4.6
Labour hold		Swing	▼5.3	

=== Crome ===
Crome
Party	Candidate	Votes	%	±%
Conservative	I. Lovewell	592	39.7	+8.8
Labour	A. Waters	588	39.5	−9.6
Liberal Democrats	I. Kendrick	281	18.9	−1.1
Green	R. Boyd	29	1.9	N/A
Majority		4	0.2	−18.0
Turnout		1,490	27.8	−1.3
Conservative gain from Labour		Swing	▲9.2	

=== Eaton ===
Eaton
Party	Candidate	Votes	%	±%
Liberal Democrats	Brian Watkins	1,861	58.0	+2.6
Conservative	Antony Little	1,032	32.2	−1.8
Labour	C. Slorach	258	8.0	−2.5
Green	John Peacock	57	1.8	N/A
Majority		829	25.8	+4.4
Turnout		3,208	49.9	−3.8
Liberal Democrats hold		Swing	▲2.2	

=== Heigham ===
Heigham
Party	Candidate	Votes	%	±%
Liberal Democrats	A. Aalders-Dunthorne	904	55.0	+6.4
Labour	C. Morrey	503	30.6	−8.2
Conservative	R. Wells	151	9.2	+1.6
Green	I. Harris	86	5.2	+0.3
Majority		401	24.4	+14.6
Turnout		1,644	29.4	−1.3
Liberal Democrats gain from Labour		Swing	▲7.3	

=== Henderson ===
Henderson
Party	Candidate	Votes	%	±%
Labour	D. Roper	456	41.5	−12.5
Liberal Democrats	G. Dean	250	22.7	+3.5
Conservative	C. Page	224	20.4	+7.3
Green	M. Valentine	170	15.5	+1.7
Majority		206	18.7	−16.0
Turnout		1,100	19.7	−0.7
Labour hold		Swing	▼8.0	

=== Lakenham ===
Lakenham
Party	Candidate	Votes	%	±%
Liberal Democrats	H. Cooke	796	48.1	+21.6
Labour	K. Brown	619	37.4	−11.6
Conservative	S. Daryanani	202	12.2	−7.9
Green	Z. Zelter	39	2.4	N/A
Majority		177	10.7	—
Turnout		1,656	29.9	+2.0
Liberal Democrats gain from Labour		Swing	▲16.6	

=== Mancroft ===
Mancroft
Party	Candidate	Votes	%	±%
Liberal Democrats	N. Ali	716	39.0	+18.7
Labour	J. Lay	588	32.1	−11.8
Conservative	J. Knight	425	23.2	−4.1
Green	T. Tigger	75	4.1	−0.6
Independent	M. Pryce	30	1.6	N/A
Majority		128	7.0	—
Turnout		1,834	27.9	+2.3
Liberal Democrats gain from Labour		Swing	▲15.3	

=== Mile Cross ===
Mile Cross
Party	Candidate	Votes	%	±%
Labour	S. Morphew	385	44.7	−14.3
Liberal Democrats	N. Langham	280	32.5	+11.1
Conservative	G. Smith	168	19.5	−0.1
Green	S. Land	28	3.3	N/A
Majority		105	12.2	−25.4
Turnout		861	16.1	−1.6
Labour hold		Swing	▼12.7	

=== Mousehold ===
Mousehold
Party	Candidate	Votes	%	±%
Liberal Democrats	S. Richardson	630	47.1	+12.9
Labour	C. Sanderson	401	30.0	−15.6
Conservative	J. Fisher	204	15.2	+0.6
Green	Adrian Holmes	64	4.8	−0.7
Independent	T. Smith	39	2.9	N/A
Majority		229	17.1	—
Turnout		1,338	22.8	+0.2
Liberal Democrats gain from Labour		Swing	▲14.3	

=== Nelson ===
Nelson
Party	Candidate	Votes	%	±%
Liberal Democrats	S. Mitchell	892	48.4	−7.5
Labour	B. Nierop-Reading	601	32.6	−6.2
Green	D. Williams	189	10.2	N/A
Conservative	N. Horwood	162	8.8	+3.5
Majority		291	15.8	−1.2
Turnout		1,844	33.4	−6.1
Liberal Democrats gain from Labour		Swing	▼0.7	

=== St. Stephen ===
St. Stephen
Party	Candidate	Votes	%	±%
Liberal Democrats	C. Southgate	861	41.4	+21.9
Labour	S. Gale	650	31.3	−14.9
Conservative	G. Williams	448	21.5	−4.1
Green	N. Bartlett	78	3.8	−1.1
Independent	S. Homes	43	2.1	N/A
Majority		211	10.1	—
Turnout		2,080	38.1	+5.4
Liberal Democrats gain from Labour		Swing	▲18.4	

=== Thorpe Hamlet ===
Thorpe Hamlet
Party	Candidate	Votes	%	±%
Liberal Democrats	S. Allison	684	53.0	−5.6
Labour	R. Taylor	293	22.7	−8.2
Conservative	V. Hopes	194	15.0	+4.5
Green	I. Wagenknecht	119	9.2	N/A
Majority		391	30.3	+2.6
Turnout		1,290	21.8	−4.6
Liberal Democrats hold		Swing	▲1.3	

=== Town Close ===
Town Close
Party	Candidate	Votes	%	±%
Liberal Democrats	A. Thomas	965	55.9	−6.5
Labour	G. Colk	383	22.2	−2.4
Conservative	I. Mackie	292	16.9	+6.3
Green	M. Charnley	78	4.5	N/A
Natural Law	D. Mills	9	0.5	−0.5
Majority		582	33.7	−4.1
Turnout		1,727	31.6	−5.2
Liberal Democrats hold		Swing	▼2.1	

=== University ===
University
Party	Candidate	Votes	%	±%
Liberal Democrats	D. Hume	1,008	59.4	−1.3
Labour	K. Lay	339	20.0	−9.0
Conservative	G. Nicholson	183	10.8	+3.9
Green	R. Tinch	166	9.8	+6.7
Majority		669	39.4	+7.4
Turnout		1,696	30.6	−6.2
Liberal Democrats hold		Swing	▲3.9	
