= 1992 Norwich City Council election =

UK local election

The 1992 Norwich City Council election took place on 7 May 1992 to elect members of Norwich City Council in England. This was on the same day as other local elections. 16 of 48 seats (one-third) were up for election, with one additional seat up due to the by-elections in Henderson ward.

== Results summary ==
1992 Norwich City Council election
Party	This election			Full council			This election		
Party	Seats	Net	Seats %	Other	Total	Total %	Votes	Votes %	+/−
Labour	13	▼2	76.5	23	36	75.0	18,763	47.8	+0.6
Liberal Democrats	3	▲2	17.6	6	9	18.8	9,254	23.6	-4.8
Conservative	1	0	5.9	2	3	6.3	10,505	26.8	+6.4
Green	0	0	0.0	0	0	0.0	712	1.8	-2.3

== Ward results ==
=== Bowthorpe ===
Bowthorpe
Party	Candidate	Votes	%	±%
Labour	B. Ferris	1,287	58.4	−0.2
Conservative	J. Knight	617	28.0	+4.0
Liberal Democrats	N. Lubbock	243	11.0	−9.2
Green	J. White	55	2.5	N/A
Majority		670	30.4	−3.2
Turnout		2,202	29.6	−9.9
Labour hold		Swing	▼2.1	

=== Catton Grove ===
Catton Grove
Party	Candidate	Votes	%	±%
Labour	G. Cox	959	51.3	+1.2
Conservative	M. Slattery	666	35.6	+3.4
Liberal Democrats	R. Richardson	174	9.3	−8.3
Green	A. Darley	70	3.7	N/A
Majority		293	15.7	—
Turnout		2,065	30.3	−8.7
Labour hold		Swing	▼1.1	

=== Coslany ===
Coslany
Party	Candidate	Votes	%	±%
Labour	P. Watson	1,367	55.8	+0.9
Conservative	E. Horth	737	30.1	+10.5
Liberal Democrats	H. Tidman	266	10.8	−9.9
Green	L. Moore	82	3.3	−1.5
Majority		630	25.7	−8.5
Turnout		2,452	39.9	−4.3
Labour hold		Swing	▼4.8	

=== Crome ===
Crome
Party	Candidate	Votes	%	±%
Labour	A. Waters	1,146	51.8	−6.1
Conservative	C. Cushing	823	37.2	+18.0
Liberal Democrats	D. Williment	242	10.9	−12.0
Majority		323	14.6	−20.3
Turnout		2,211	39.0	−3.7
Labour hold		Swing	▼12.1	

=== Eaton ===
Eaton
Party	Candidate	Votes	%	±%
Conservative	L. Cooper	1,954	57.8	+3.0
Labour	J. Clissold	866	25.8	+3.5
Liberal Democrats	S. Oakley	558	16.5	−2.7
Majority		1,088	32.0	−0.5
Turnout		3,378	51.8	−5.5
Conservative hold		Swing	▼0.3	

=== Heigham ===
Heigham
Party	Candidate	Votes	%	±%
Labour	C. Morrey	1,100	49.8	+0.4
Liberal Democrats	A. Dunthorne	783	35.4	+3.9
Conservative	V. Rayna	326	14.8	−0.3
Majority		317	32.2	−1.1
Turnout		2,209	38.5	−4.0
Labour hold		Swing	▼1.8	

=== Henderson ===
Henderson (2 seats due to by-election)
Party	Candidate	Votes	%	±%
Labour	J. Sillett	984	51.3	−1.8
Labour	A. Jones	934		
Conservative	P. Munday	393	20.5	−0.3
Liberal Democrats	L. Dunthorne	271	14.1	−1.7
Green	J. Yarrow	270	14.1	+2.1
Liberal Democrats	R. Holloway	219		
Turnout			31.2	−13.0
Labour hold				
Labour hold				

=== Lakenham ===
Lakenham
Party	Candidate	Votes	%	±%
Labour	K. Brown	1,229	57.7	±0.0
Conservative	C. Barry	651	30.6	+9.8
Liberal Democrats	J. Robinson	249	11.7	−4.1
Majority		578	27.1	−9.8
Turnout		2,129	36.7	−7.5
Labour hold		Swing	▼4.9	

=== Mancroft ===
Mancroft
Party	Candidate	Votes	%	±%
Labour	G. Gee	1,205	50.2	−0.3
Conservative	R. Essex	943	39.3	+11.6
Liberal Democrats	C. Risebrook	252	10.5	−6.7
Majority		262	10.9	−11.9
Turnout		2,400	37.8	−2.0
Labour hold		Swing	▼6.0	

=== Mile Cross ===
Mile Cross
Party	Candidate	Votes	%	±%
Labour	S. Betts	937	65.8	−3.6
Conservative	D. Roberts	357	25.1	+10.5
Liberal Democrats	J. Heaviside	98	6.9	−5.6
Green	D. Mackellar	33	2.3	−1.2
Majority		580	40.7	−14.1
Turnout		1,425	25.5	−12.3
Labour hold		Swing	▼7.1	

=== Mousehold ===
Mousehold
Party	Candidate	Votes	%	±%
Labour	D. Machin	1,252	61.7	+2.1
Conservative	I. Evans	540	26.6	+8.3
Liberal Democrats	P. Denington	237	11.7	−4.5
Majority		712	35.1	−6.3
Turnout		2,029	33.1	−4.8
Labour hold		Swing	▼3.1	

=== Nelson ===
Nelson
Party	Candidate	Votes	%	±%
Liberal Democrats	A. De Findlow	1,246	43.6	+0.2
Labour	W. Chapman	1,073	37.5	−2.3
Conservative	E. Martin	339	11.9	+0.4
Green	D. Carlo	202	7.1	+1.8
Majority		173	6.0	+2.4
Turnout		2,860	57.0	−1.8
Liberal Democrats gain from Labour		Swing	▲1.3	

=== St. Stephen ===
St. Stephen
Party	Candidate	Votes	%	±%
Labour	J. Swainson	1,306	47.5	−6.6
Conservative	A. Daws	861	31.3	N/A
Liberal Democrats	A. Leeder	582	21.2	−15.4
Majority		445	16.2	−1.3
Turnout		2,749	39.8	−7.2
Labour hold		Swing	▼19.0	

=== Thorpe Hamlet ===
Thorpe Hamlet
Party	Candidate	Votes	%	±%
Liberal Democrats	J. Benwell	1,321	56.1	−3.8
Labour	M. Pendred	642	27.2	+4.6
Conservative	J. Rush	393	16.7	+4.8
Majority		679	28.8	−8.5
Turnout		2,356	39.8	−6.8
Liberal Democrats hold		Swing	▼4.2	

=== Town Close ===
Town Close
Party	Candidate	Votes	%	±%
Liberal Democrats	A. Thomas	1,606	48.7	−8.7
Labour	B. Smith	1,202	36.5	+5.6
Conservative	S. Collier	487	14.8	+5.0
Majority		404	12.3	−13.8
Turnout		3,295	58.7	−3.1
Liberal Democrats gain from Labour		Swing	▼7.2	

=== University ===
University
Party	Candidate	Votes	%	±%
Labour	P. Harris	1,274	49.0	+10.3
Liberal Democrats	T. Davie	907	34.9	−12.6
Conservative	C. Page	418	16.1	+5.4
Majority		367	14.1	—
Turnout		2,599	51.7	−5.7
Labour hold		Swing	▲11.5	
