= 1994 Norwich City Council election =

1994 UK local government election

The 1994 Norwich City Council election took place on 5 May 1994 to elect members of Norwich City Council in England. This was on the same day as other local elections. 16 of 48 seats (one-third) were up for election, with one additional seat up due to a by-election in Lakenham ward.

== Results summary ==
1994 Norwich City Council election
Party	This election			Full council			This election		
Party	Seats	Net	Seats %	Other	Total	Total %	Votes	Votes %	+/−
Labour	13	Steady	76.5	23	36	75.0	23,466	55.4	+7.6
Liberal Democrats	4	▲1	23.5	6	10	20.8	12,794	30.2	+6.6
Conservative	0	▼1	0.0	1	2	4.2	5,657	13.3	-13.5
Green	0	Steady	0.0	0	0	0.0	474	1.1	-0.7

== Ward results ==
=== Bowthorpe ===
Bowthorpe
Party	Candidate	Votes	%	±%
Labour	D. Underwood	1,863	70.2	+11.8
Liberal Democrats	N. Lubbock	401	15.1	+4.1
Conservative	H. Collins	302	11.4	−16.6
Green	S. Pollard	88	3.3	+0.8
Majority		1,462	55.1	+24.7
Turnout		2,654	35.3	5.7
Labour hold		Swing	▲3.9	

=== Catton Grove ===
Catton Grove
Party	Candidate	Votes	%	±%
Labour	R. Quinn	1,419	68.8	+17.5
Liberal Democrats	A. Moore	358	17.4	+8.1
Conservative	P. Kearney	286	13.9	−21.7
Majority		1,061	51.4	+35.7
Turnout		2,063	33.2	+2.9
Labour hold		Swing	▲4.7	

=== Coslany ===
Coslany
Party	Candidate	Votes	%	±%
Labour	S. Curran	1,583	66.2	+10.4
Conservative	E. Horth	379	15.8	−14.3
Liberal Democrats	L. Maxfield	344	14.4	+3.5
Green	A. Holmes	86	3.6	+0.3
Majority		1,204	50.4	24.6
Turnout		2,394	39.4	−0.5
Labour hold		Swing	▲12.4	

=== Crome ===
Crome
Party	Candidate	Votes	%	±%
Labour	D. Bradford	1,584	68.6	+16.8
Liberal Democrats	D. Mackellar	420	18.2	+7.3
Conservative	M. Windscheffel	305	13.2	−24.0
Majority		1,164	50.4	+35.8
Turnout		2,309	41.3	+2.3
Labour hold		Swing	▲9.5	

=== Eaton ===
Eaton
Party	Candidate	Votes	%	±%
Liberal Democrats	I. Couzens	1,423	40.1	+23.6
Conservative	W. Knight	1,181	33.3	−24.5
Labour	A. Dawson	942	26.6	+0.8
Majority		242	6.8	N/A
Turnout		3,546	54.7	+2.9
Liberal Democrats gain from Conservative		Swing	▲24.1	

=== Heigham ===
Heigham
Party	Candidate	Votes	%	±%
Labour	R. Durrant	1,429	50.4	+0.6
Liberal Democrats	A. Dunthorne	1,282	45.2	+9.8
Conservative	M. Gant	125	4.4	−10.4
Majority		147	5.2	−27.0
Turnout		2,836	49.6	+11.1
Labour hold		Swing	▼4.6	

=== Henderson ===
Henderson
Party	Candidate	Votes	%	±%
Labour	A. Jones	1,414	71.4	+20.1
Liberal Democrats	E. Maxfield	410	20.7	+6.6
Conservative	A. Hillard	156	7.9	−12.6
Majority		1,004	50.7	—
Turnout		1,980	34.9	+3.7
Labour hold		Swing	▲6.8	

=== Lakenham ===
Lakenham (2 seats due to by-election)
Party	Candidate	Votes	%	±%
Labour	A. Clare	1,419	67.6	+9.9
Labour	A. Brown	1,408		
Liberal Democrats	Y. Barnes	373	17.8	+7.3
Liberal Democrats	D. Elgood	320		
Conservative	E. Cooper	308	14.7	−15.9
Conservative	G. Drake	299		
Turnout			36.4	
Labour hold				
Labour hold				

=== Mancroft ===
Mancroft
Party	Candidate	Votes	%	±%
Labour	D. Fullman	1,509	62.1	+11.9
Conservative	J. Knight	450	18.5	−20.8
Liberal Democrats	C. Risebrook	375	15.4	+4.9
Green	K. Greenwood	95	3.9	N/A
Majority		1,059	43.6	+32.7
Turnout		2,429	37.5	−0.3
Labour hold		Swing	▲24.0	

=== Mile Cross ===
Mile Cross
Party	Candidate	Votes	%	±%
Labour	S. Fry	1,408	77.4	+11.6
Liberal Democrats	J. Wilkes	246	13.5	+6.6
Conservative	L. Quayle	164	9.0	−16.1
Majority		1,162	63.9	+23.2
Turnout		1,818	32.3	+6.8
Labour hold		Swing	▲2.5	

=== Mousehold ===
Mousehold
Party	Candidate	Votes	%	±%
Labour	N. Williams	1,261	52.5	−9.2
Liberal Democrats	C. Freestone	861	35.9	+24.2
Conservative	I. Evans	196	8.2	−18.4
Green	L. Moore	82	3.4	N/A
Majority		400	16.7	−18.4
Turnout		2,400	38.5	+5.4
Labour hold		Swing	▲16.7	

=== Nelson ===
Nelson
Party	Candidate	Votes	%	±%
Liberal Democrats	L. Jennings	1,384	49.4	+5.8
Labour	M. Pendred	1,220	43.6	+6.1
Conservative	A. Radford	196	7.0	−4.9
Majority		164	5.8	−0.2
Turnout		2,800	55.6	−1.4
Liberal Democrats hold		Swing	▼0.2	

=== St. Stephen ===
St. Stephen
Party	Candidate	Votes	%	±%
Labour	C. Wright	1,578	62.9	+15.4
Conservative	A. Mann	516	20.6	−10.7
Liberal Democrats	A. Dann	414	16.5	−4.7
Majority		1,062	42.3	+26.1
Turnout		2,508	45.7	+5.9
Labour hold		Swing	▲13.1	

=== Thorpe Hamlet ===
Thorpe Hamlet
Party	Candidate	Votes	%	±%
Liberal Democrats	R. Anthony	1,285	52.9	−3.2
Labour	D. Joseph	794	32.7	+5.5
Conservative	M. Dean	229	9.4	−7.3
Green	K. Stubbs	123	5.1	N/A
Majority		491	20.2	−8.6
Turnout		2,431	41.0	+1.2
Liberal Democrats hold		Swing	▼4.4	

=== Town Close ===
Town Close
Party	Candidate	Votes	%	±%
Liberal Democrats	T. Stickle	1,574	49.9	+1.2
Labour	B. Smith	1,292	41.0	+4.5
Conservative	S. Collier	289	9.2	−5.6
Majority		282	8.9	−3.4
Turnout		3,155	56.7	−2.0
Liberal Democrats hold		Swing	▼1.7	

=== University ===
University
Party	Candidate	Votes	%	±%
Labour	E. Stock	1,343	45.6	−3.4
Liberal Democrats	S. Fearnley	1,324	45.0	+10.1
Conservative	W. Spencer	276	9.4	−6.7
Majority		19	0.6	−13.5
Turnout		2,943	53.6	+1.9
Labour hold		Swing	▼6.8	
