= 2023 Norwich City Council election =

- 4 May 2023

13 out of 39 seats to Norwich City Council 20 seats needed for a majority
- Turnout: 35.8%
	First party	Second party	Third party
Leader	Alan Waters	Lucy Galvin	James Wright
Party	Labour	Green	Liberal Democrats
Seats before	25	11	3
Seats won	7	5	1
Seats after	23	13	3
Seat change	▼2	▲2	Steady
Popular vote	15,497	11,983	4,410
Percentage	42.7%	33.0%	12.2%
Swing	▲4.7pp	▲2.6pp	▼2.6pp
- Winner of each seat at the 2023 Norwich City Council election.
Leader before election
Alan Waters
Labour
Leader after election
Mike Stonard
Labour

The 2023 Norwich City Council election took place on 4 May 2023 to elect members of Norwich City Council in Norfolk, England. This was on the same day as other local elections in England.

== Overview ==
The council was under Labour majority control prior to the election. The leader of the council was Alan Waters, who had led the council since 2015. He chose not to stand for re-election.

The Greens made two gains from Labour at the election, but Labour retained a majority of the seats on the council. At the subsequent annual council meeting on 23 May 2023, Labour councillor Mike Stonard was appointed the new leader of the council.

== Summary ==
=== Election result ===
2023 Norwich City Council election
Party	This election				Full council			This election		
Party	Candidates	Seats	Net	Seats %	Other	Total	Total %	Votes	Votes %	+/−
Labour	{{{candidates}}}	7	▼2	53.8	16	23	59.0	15,497	42.7	▲4.7
Green	{{{candidates}}}	5	▲2	38.5	8	13	33.3	11,983	33.0	▲2.6
Liberal Democrats	{{{candidates}}}	1	Steady	7.7	2	3	7.7	4,410	12.2	▼2.6
Conservative	{{{candidates}}}	0	Steady	0.0	0	0	0.0	4,328	11.9	▼2.1
Independent	{{{candidates}}}	0	Steady	0.0	0	0	0.0	56	0.2	▼0.1

Changes in vote share are relative to the last time these seats were contested in 2019.

== Ward results ==
The Statement of Persons Nominated, which details the candidates standing in each ward, was released by Norwich City Council following the close of nominations on 5 April 2023.

=== Bowthorpe ===
Bowthorpe
Party	Candidate	Votes	%	±%
Labour	Peter Richard Prinsley	1,185	60.6	+1.6
Conservative	Tala Houseago	295	15.1	–5.5
Liberal Democrats	Timothy Bennett	238	12.2	+2.9
Green	Maria Rampley	236	12.1	+1.0
Majority		890	45.5	+7.1
Turnout		1,954	28.1	–1.0
Registered electors		6,963		
Labour hold		Swing	▲3.6	

=== Catton Grove ===
Catton Grove
Party	Candidate	Votes	%	±%
Labour Co-op	Jess Carrington	1,309	56.7	+2.9
Conservative	Edward Potter	500	21.7	–2.8
Green	Tony Park	350	15.2	–0.3
Liberal Democrats	Ian Williams	148	6.4	+0.2
Majority		809	35.0	+5.7
Turnout		2,307	29.2	–0.3
Registered electors		7,939		
Labour Co-op hold		Swing	▲2.9	

=== Crome ===
Crome
Party	Candidate	Votes	%	±%
Labour	Matthew Packer	1,299	54.1	+1.7
Conservative	Simon Jones	552	23.0	–8.0
Green	James Killbery	399	16.6	+5.3
Liberal Democrats	Clifford Lubbock	152	6.3	+1.9
Majority		747	31.1	+10.6
Turnout		2,402	28.8	–2.9
Registered electors		8,353		
Labour hold		Swing	▲4.9	

=== Eaton ===
Eaton
Party	Candidate	Votes	%	±%
Liberal Democrats	Judith Lubbock*	2,215	54.1	+5.7
Labour	Carli Harper	913	22.3	–8.3
Green	Jane Saunders	501	12.2	+4.3
Conservative	Morgan Gwynn	463	11.3	–1.8
Majority		1,302	31.8	+14.0
Turnout		4,092	52.3	–3.0
Registered electors		7,855		
Liberal Democrats hold		Swing	▲7.0	

=== Lakenham ===
Lakenham
Party	Candidate	Votes	%	±%
Labour	Keith Driver*	1,399	56.9	+0.2
Green	Mark Finbow	486	19.8	+5.0
Conservative	Eric Masters	341	13.9	–5.0
Liberal Democrats	Arthur Wu	231	9.4	–0.3
Majority		913	37.1	–0.7
Turnout		2,457	31.9	–0.2
Registered electors		7,776		
Labour hold		Swing	▼2.4	

=== Mancroft ===
Mancroft
Party	Candidate	Votes	%	±%
Green	Amanda Fox	1,491	61.3	–0.6
Labour	Jasper Haywood	642	26.4	–0.2
Conservative	Thomas Cornish	225	9.2	–0.2
Liberal Democrats	Alan Wright	75	3.1	+1.0
Majority		849	34.9	–0.4
Turnout		2,433	32.5	–2.8
Registered electors		7,519		
Green hold		Swing	▼0.2	

=== Mile Cross ===
Mile Cross
Party	Candidate	Votes	%	±%
Labour	Jacob Huntley*	1,016	47.9	–11.2
Green	Tom Holloway	660	31.1	+14.6
Conservative	Jane Fisher	267	12.6	–7.3
Liberal Democrats	Desmond Fulcher	122	5.8	+1.3
Independent	Abby Hoffman	56	2.6	N/A
Majority		356	16.8	–22.4
Turnout		2,121	27.4	+2.2
Registered electors		7,777		
Labour hold		Swing	▼12.9	

=== Nelson ===
Nelson
Party	Candidate	Votes	%	±%
Green	Hannah Hoechner	2,281	57.3	+4.0
Labour	Michael Howard	1,322	33.2	–3.6
Conservative	John Fisher	212	5.3	–0.3
Liberal Democrats	David Fairbairn	164	4.1	+0.8
Majority		959	24.1	+7.6
Turnout		3,979	49.0	–0.4
Registered electors		8,172		
Green hold		Swing	▲3.8	

=== Sewell ===
Sewell
Party	Candidate	Votes	%	±%
Green	Gillian Francis	1,666	55.2	+3.8
Labour	Julie Brociek-Coulton*	1,091	36.1	–2.4
Conservative	Stephen Bailey	189	6.3	–1.4
Liberal Democrats	Helen Arundell	72	2.4	+0.1
Majority		575	19.1	+6.2
Turnout		3,018	39.2	–1.5
Registered electors		7,708		
Green gain from Labour		Swing	▲3.1	

=== Thorpe Hamlet ===
Thorpe Hamlet
Party	Candidate	Votes	%	±%
Green	Josh Worley	1,420	48.8	–2.5
Labour	Jane Overhill	997	34.2	+4.1
Conservative	Victoria Saunders	336	11.5	–3.1
Liberal Democrats	Jeremy Hooke	158	5.4	+1.4
Majority		423	14.6	–6.6
Turnout		2,911	37.3	–0.4
Registered electors		7,841		
Green hold		Swing	▼3.3	

=== Town Close ===
Town Close
Party	Candidate	Votes	%	±%
Labour	Karen Davis*	1,835	55.3	–2.4
Green	Iolo Jones	696	21.0	+1.6
Conservative	Mary Chacksfield	543	16.4	+0.7
Liberal Democrats	Carol Chilton	243	7.3	+0.1
Majority		1,139	34.3	–4.0
Turnout		3,317	41.9	–1.5
Registered electors		7,980		
Labour hold		Swing	▼2.0	

=== University ===
University
Party	Candidate	Votes	%	±%
Labour	Beth Jones*	1,206	50.6	–5.3
Liberal Democrats	James Hawketts	512	21.5	+14.4
Green	Sean Gough	492	20.6	–2.5
Conservative	Hassan Iqbal	173	7.3	–6.7
Majority		694	29.1	–3.7
Turnout		2,383	31.0	+1.2
Registered electors		7,766		
Labour hold		Swing	▼9.9	

=== Wensum ===
Wensum
Party	Candidate	Votes	%	±%
Green	Liam Calvert	1,305	45.0	+16.8
Labour	Laura McCartney-Gray	1,283	44.2	–9.3
Conservative	Benedict Baldwin	232	8.0	–6.1
Liberal Democrats	Gordon Dean	80	2.8	–1.4
Majority		22	0.8	N/A
Turnout		2,900	35.2	+3.0
Registered electors		8,280		
Green gain from Labour		Swing	▲13.1	
