= 2016 Norwich City Council election =

2016 city council election for Norwich, England

← 2015	5 May 2016	2018 →

13 of 39 seats (One Third) to Norwich City Council 20 seats needed for a majority

	First party	Second party	Third party
Party	Labour	Green	Liberal Democrats
Seats before	22	14	3
Seats won	11	1	1
Seats after	26	10	3
Seat change	▲4	▼4	Steady
Popular vote	15,542	7,391	3,743
Percentage	44.3%	21.1%	10.7%
Swing	▲4.6pp	▼9.3pp	▼2.3pp
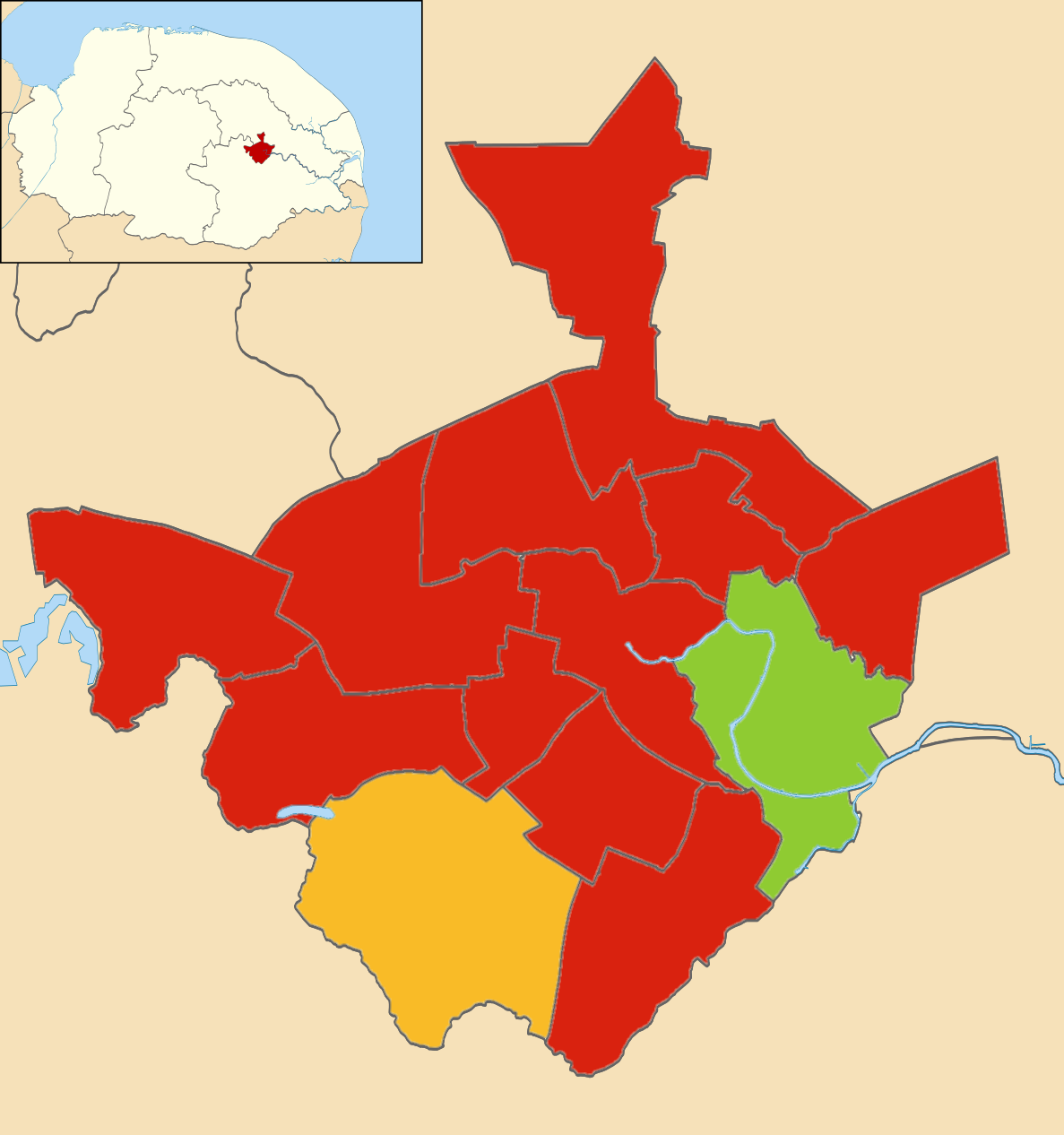
- Map showing the 2016 local election results in Norwich.
Council control before election
Labour Party (UK)
Council control after election
Labour Party (UK)

The 2016 Norwich City Council election took place on 5 May 2016 to elect members of Norwich City Council in England. This was on the same day as other local elections. The Labour Party increased their majority at the expense of the Green Party, capturing 4 previously Green-held seats; the Greens retained only Thorpe Hamlet ward, by a margin of 31 votes.

The Labour Party achieved its best result in the city since 1998, winning 44% of the vote and 11 of 13 seats up for election, with the Greens dropping to their worst percentage result since 2005. UKIP achieved its best-ever result in the city, at 10.5%.

The scale of the Labour victory was reported to have surprised both Labour and the Green Party and was partly attributed to Jeremy Corbyn's leadership of the Labour Party bringing "some voters who had previously switched to the Greens back to Labour".

All changes in vote share are calculated with reference to the 2012 election, the last time these seats were contested.

== Overall result ==
Norwich City Council Election, 2016
Party	Seats	Gains	Losses	Net gain/loss	Seats %	Votes %	Votes	+/−
Labour	11	4	0	+4	84.6	44.3	15,542	+4.6
Green	1	0	4	-4	7.7	21.1	7,391	-9.3
Conservative	0	−	−	−	−	13.4	4,709	-2.9
Liberal Democrats	1	−	−	−	7.7	10.7	3,743	-2.3
UKIP	0	−	−	−	−	10.5	3,697	+9.8
Total	13	Turnout				36.25	35,082	

Changes in vote share are relative to the last time these seats were contested in 2012.

== Council composition ==
Prior to the election the composition of the council was:

↓
22	14	3
Labour	Green	Lib Dem

After the election, the composition of the council was:

↓
26	10	3
Labour	Green	Lib Dem

== Ward results ==
=== Bowthorpe ===
Bowthorpe ward
Party	Candidate	Votes	%	±%
Labour	Sally Ann Button	1,218	53.5	+1.2
Conservative	James Edward Burgess	387	17.0	−8.2
UKIP	Michelle Newton	371	16.3	‘‘N/A’’
Green	Helen Carter	213	9.4	−5.7
Liberal Democrats	Yan Leon Malinowski	89	3.9	−1.1
Majority		831	36.5	
Turnout		2,278	26.0	
Labour hold		Swing		

=== Catton Grove ===
Catton Grove ward
Party	Candidate	Votes	%	±%
Labour	Gail Paula Harris	1,150	47.4	+0.2
Conservative	Daniel Edward Elmer	607	25.0	−7.0
UKIP	Michelle Ho	372	15.3	‘‘N/A’’
Green	Tony Park	175	7.2	−7.9
Liberal Democrats	Leigh Tooke	123	5.1	−0.6
Majority		543	22.4	
Turnout		2.427		
Labour hold		Swing		

=== Crome ===
Crome ward
Party	Candidate	Votes	%	±%
Labour	David Charles Bradford	1,201	54.1	−7.7
UKIP	Ann Williams	396	17.8	‘‘N/A’’
Conservative	Stephen Mark Barber	375	16.9	−2.0
Green	Judith Marianne Ford	163	7.3	−6.0
Liberal Democrats	Samuel Neal	85	3.8	−2.3
Majority		805	36.3	
Turnout		2,220		
Labour hold		Swing		

=== Eaton ===
Eaton ward
Party	Candidate	Votes	%	±%
Liberal Democrats	Judith Lubbock	1,956	53.7	+3.4
Conservative	William Robb	725	19.9	−5.9
Labour	Chris Elderton	689	18.9	+0.3
Green	Jane Saunders	274	7.5	−2.8
UKIP	Gordon Cullingworth	194	5.3	‘‘N/A’’
Majority		1,231	33.8	
Turnout		3,644		
Liberal Democrats hold		Swing		

=== Lakenham ===
Lakenham ward
Party	Candidate	Votes	%	±%
Labour	Patrick Manning	1,279	53.1	+7.5
UKIP	Steve Emmens	393	16.3	+7.8
Green	Christopher Hull	280	11.6	−2.7
Conservative	Andrew Roy Wiltshire	234	9.7	+4.3
Liberal Democrats	Emily Rachel Cutler	223	9.3	−16.8
Majority		886	36.8	
Turnout		2,409		
Labour hold		Swing		

=== Mancroft ===
Mancroft ward
Party	Candidate	Votes	%	±%
Labour	David Fullman	1,232	43.8	+6.3
Green	Amanda Chapman	877	31.2	−11.6
UKIP	Michael Ball	287	10.2	‘‘N/A’’
Conservative	Joshua Waller	271	9.6	−1.9
Liberal Democrats	Thomas Crisp	144	5.1	−3.1
Majority		355	12.6	
Turnout		2,811		
Labour gain from Green		Swing		

=== Mile Cross ===
Mile Cross ward
Party	Candidate	Votes	%	±%
Labour	Vivien Thomas	1,024	52.4	−2.4
UKIP	David Rowell	338	17.3	‘‘N/A’’
Green	Lisa Jayne Shaw	264	13.5	−8.5
Conservative	John Fisher	239	12.2	−3.8
Liberal Democrats	Thomas Dymoke	89	4.6	−2.6
Majority		686	35.1	
Turnout		1,954		
Labour hold		Swing		

=== Nelson ===
Nelson ward
Party	Candidate	Votes	%	±%
Labour	Hugo Malik	1,718	50.6	+25.4
Green	Roland Pascoe	1,217	35.8	−23.7
Liberal Democrats	David Fairbairn	208	6.1	−0.2
Conservative	Alexander Haines	176	5.2	−3.8
UKIP	Steven Bradley	79	2.3	New
Majority		501	14.8	
Turnout		3,398	43.93	
Labour gain from Green		Swing		

=== Sewell ===
Sewell ward
Party	Candidate	Votes	%	±%
Labour	Ed Coleshill	1,257	52.5	+6.3
Green	Gunnar Eigener	402	16.8	−15.8
Conservative	Mary Chacksfield	321	13.4	−2.1
UKIP	Glenn Tingle	254	10.6	New
Liberal Democrats	Richard Smith	160	6.7	+1.0
Majority		855	35.7	
Turnout		2,394		
Labour hold		Swing		

=== Thorpe Hamlet ===
Thorpe Hamlet ward
Party	Candidate	Votes	%	±%
Green	Benjamin Price	1,123	36.3	−6.4
Labour	Eamonn Burgess	1,092	35.3	+4.8
Conservative	Michael Gillespie	458	14.8	−2.0
UKIP	Nicholas Landsdell	230	7.4	‘‘N/A’’
Liberal Democrats	Melvyn Elias	188	6.1	−3.9
Majority		31	1.0	
Turnout		3,091	33.3	
Green hold		Swing		

=== Town Close ===
Town Close ward
Party	Candidate	Votes	%	±%
Labour	Karen Davis	1,420	38.9	+10.6
Green	Paul Neale	1,233	33.7	−12.4
Conservative	Jonathan Gillespie	509	13.9	−2.8
Liberal Democrats	James Anthony	276	7.6	−1.2
UKIP	Tania Emmens	215	5.9	‘‘N/A’’
Majority		188	5.2	
Turnout		3,652		
Labour gain from Green		Swing		

=== University ===
University ward
Party	Candidate	Votes	%	±%
Labour	Beth Jones	1,152	58.8	+1.8
Green	Phil Di Palma	315	16.1	−8.3
UKIP	Drew Collins	189	9.6	‘‘N/A’’
Conservative	Henry Newton	179	9.1	−3.1
Liberal Democrats	Adam Stokes	125	6.4	±0.0
Majority		837	42.7	
Turnout		1,960	28.9	
Labour hold		Swing		

=== Wensum ===
Wensum ward
Party	Candidate	Votes	%	±%
Labour	Kevin Maguire	1,110	41.9	+3.6
Green	Richard Edwards	855	32.3	−18.8
UKIP	Paul Harley	379	14.3	‘‘N/A’’
Conservative	William Richardson	228	8.6	+1.4
Liberal Democrats	Jack Spoor	77	2.9	−0.5
Majority		255	9.6	
Turnout		2,649		
Labour gain from Green		Swing		
