= 2015 Norwich City Council election =

2015 city council election for Norwich, England

← 2014	7 May 2015	2016 →

15 of 39 seats to Norwich City Council 20 seats needed for a majority

	First party	Second party	Third party
Party	Labour	Green	Liberal Democrats
Seats before	21	15	3
Seats won	10	4	1
Seats after	22	14	3
Seat change	▲1	▼1	Steady
Popular vote	22,755	16,106	6,932
Percentage	34.9%	24.7%	10.9%
Swing	▼1.7pp	▼3.3pp	▼1.6pp
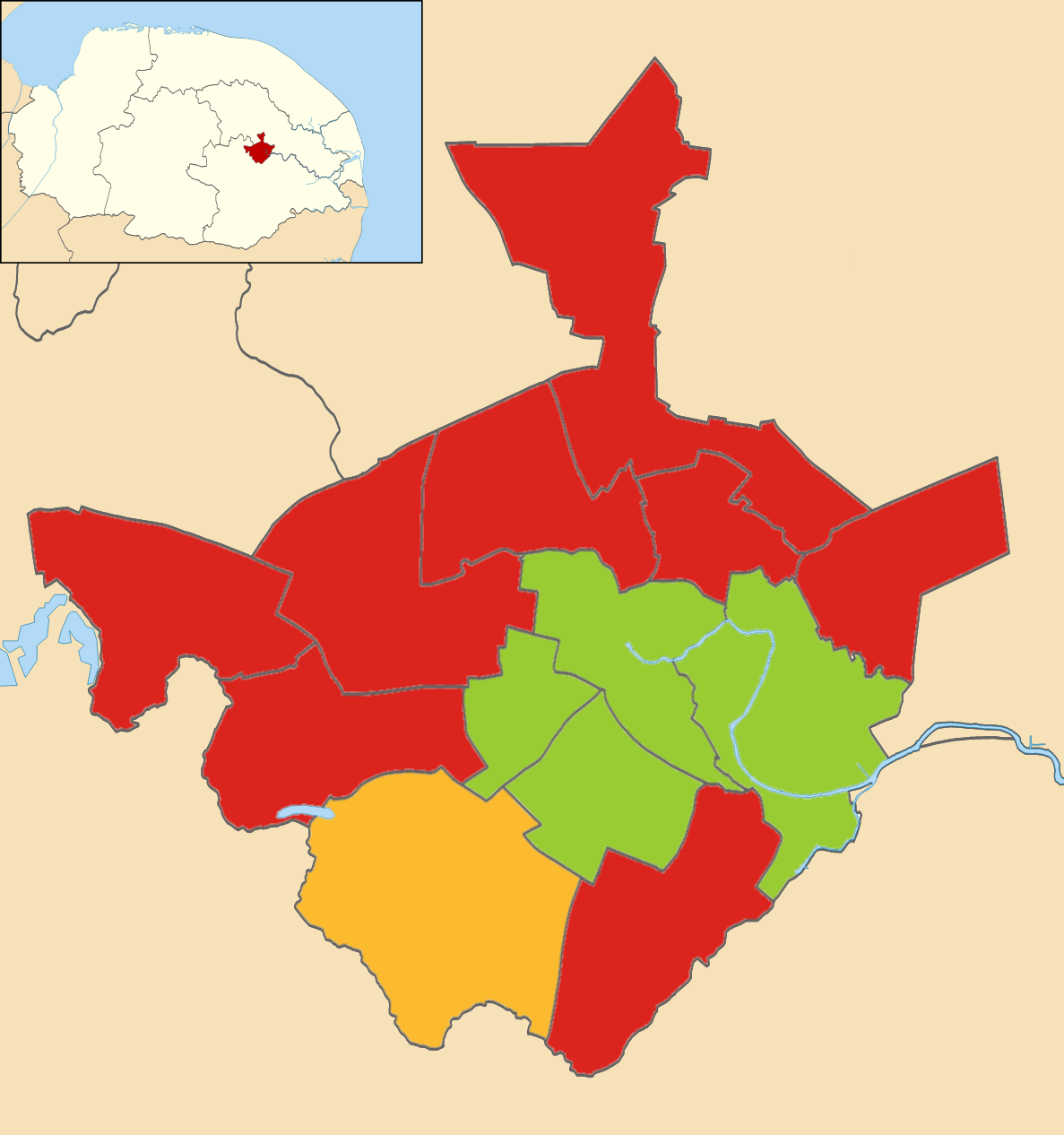
- Map showing the 2015 local election results in Norwich.
Council control before election
Labour Party (UK)
Council control after election
Labour Party (UK)

The 2015 Norwich City Council election took place on 7 May 2015 to elect approximately one third of the members of Norwich City Council in England. This was on the same day as other local elections and the UK general election. Thirteen seats were due to be contested, with a further two seats up for election where casual vacancies had arisen. Labour won ten of the available seats, the Green Party won four, and the Liberal Democrats one. The Conservatives gained their highest ever vote in many city wards including Town Close and Thorpe Hamlet, and across Norwich came within almost 2000 votes of the Green Party, however failed to gain any seats. Just one seat changed hands - Wensum - which Labour gained from the Greens. Labour retained overall control of the council with 22 seats out of 39, the Greens continue to form the main opposition with 14 seats, and the Liberal Democrats have 3.

All changes in vote share are calculated with reference to the 2011 election, the last time these seats were contested.

== Overall result ==
Norwich City Council Election, 2015
Party	Seats	Gains	Losses	Net gain/loss	Seats %	Votes %	Votes	+/−
Labour	10	1	0	+1	66.7	34.9	22,755	-1.7
Green	4	0	1	-1	26.7	24.7	16,302	-3.3
Conservative	0	0	0	0	0	21.3	13,933	+0.6
Liberal Democrats	1	0	0	0	6.7	10.6	6,932	-1.6
UKIP	0	0	0	0	0	8.1	5,304	+5.9
Left Unity	0	0	0	0	0	0.1	37	N/A
Total	15	Turnout				62.0	65,263	

Changes in vote share are relative to the last time these seats were contested in 2011.

== Ward results ==
Below are the ward results for Norwich's 13 wards. All the ward are elected one councillor apart from Sewell and Mile Cross ward, who both elected two councillors. Changes in vote share shown are changes from the result for these seats in the 2011 City Council election.

=== Bowthorpe ===
Bowthorpe
Party	Candidate	Votes	%	±%
Labour	Mike Sands	1,955	40.0	−5.8
Conservative	Daniel Elmer	1,087	22.2	−12.7
UKIP	Eric Masters	743	15.2	n/a
Green	Jean Bishop	710	14.5	+1.0
Liberal Democrats	Thomas Johnston	395	8.1	+2.4
Majority		868	17.8	
Turnout		4,890	55.8	
Labour hold		Swing		

=== Catton Grove ===
Catton Grove ward
Party	Candidate	Votes	%	±%
Labour	Paul Kendrick	1,702	36.5	−5.0
Conservative	Will Holmes	1,411	30.3	−2.0
UKIP	Michelle Ho	799	17.1	+9.1
Green	Tony Park	483	10.4	+0.2
Liberal Democrats	Leigh Tooke	269	5.8	−1.3
Majority		291	6.2	
Turnout		4,464	56.9	
Labour hold		Swing		

=== Crome ===
Crome ward
Party	Candidate	Votes	%	±%
Labour	Alan Walters	1,821	42.3	−10.1
Conservative	David Mackie	1,132	26.3	+1.6
UKIP	Ann Williams	793	18.4	+10.6
Green	Judith Ford	350	8.1	−1.6
Liberal Democrats	Chris Thomas	175	4.1	−1.3
Left Unity	Anthony Sweeney	37	0.9	n/a
Majority		689	16.0	
Turnout		4,308	59.0	
Labour hold		Swing		

=== Eaton ===
Eaton ward
Party	Candidate	Votes	%	±%
Liberal Democrats	Caroline Ackroyd	2,176	37.1	+2.9
Conservative	William Robb	1,598	27.2	−4.0
Labour	Chris Elderton	1,226	20.9	−0.9
Green	Jane Saunders	869	14.8	+2.0
Majority		578	9.9	
Turnout		5,866	77.6	
Liberal Democrats hold		Swing		

=== Lakenham ===
Lakenham ward
Party	Candidate	Votes	%	±%
Labour	Keith Driver	1,700	37.8	+3.8
UKIP	Steve Emmens	733	16.3	+9.6
Green	Laura Middleton	718	16.0	−2.5
Liberal Democrats	David Fairbairn	674	15.0	−6.3
Conservative	Hannah Felton	669	14.9	+3.1
Majority		967	21.5	
Turnout		4,494	62.5	
Labour hold		Swing		

=== Mancroft ===
Mancroft ward
Party	Candidate	Votes	%	±%
Green	Martin Schmierer	1,805	37.0	−4.5
Labour	Beth Jones	1,730	35.4	+2.0
Conservative	Barry Cochrane	961	19.7	+4.7
Liberal Democrats	Melvyn Elias	386	7.9	−2.2
Majority		75	1.6	
Turnout		4,882	58.3	
Green hold		Swing		

=== Mile Cross ===
Mile Cross ward elected two seats in this election, with each voter casting up to two votes under the plurality-at-large voting system.

Mile Cross ward
Party	Candidate	Votes	%	±%
Labour	Vaughan Thomas	1,675	36.6	−14.4
Labour	Vivien Thomas	1,410	—	—
Conservative	Mary Chacksfield	921	20.1	+1.6
UKIP	Steven Bradley	905	19.8	+15.4
Green	Richard Edwards	802	17.5	+3.3
Conservative	Paul Holmes	653	—	—
Green	Gunnar Eigener	605	—	—
Liberal Democrats	Sarah Cunningham	272	5.9	−6.1
Liberal Democrats	Michael Sutton-Croft	204	—	—
Majority		754		
Majority		489		
Turnout		7,955	53.1	
Labour hold		Swing		
Labour hold		Swing		

=== Nelson ===
Nelson ward
Party	Candidate	Votes	%	±%
Green	Denise Carlo	2,750	50.2	−4.7
Labour	Hugo Malik	1,685	30.7	+4.5
Conservative	James Wight	656	12.0	+0.7
Liberal Democrats	Yan Malinowski	393	7.2	−0.5
Majority		1,065	19.5	
Turnout		5,484	70.9	
Green hold		Swing		

=== Sewell ===
Sewell ward elected two seats in this election, with each voter casting up to two votes under the plurality-at-large voting system.

Sewell ward
Party	Candidate	Votes	%	±%
Labour	Julie Brociek-Coulton	2,018	39.3	−1.9
Labour	Ed Coleshill	1,454	—	—
Green	Thomas Holloway	1,058	20.6	−4.4
Conservative	Anthony Barton	1,046	20.4	+0.5
Conservative	Evelyn Collishaw	1,031	—	—
Green	Matthew Townsend	1,015	—	—
UKIP	Glenn Tingle	628	12.2	+6.7
Liberal Democrats	Thomas Crisp	383	7.5	−0.9
Liberal Democrats	Neal Samuel	205	—	—
Majority		960		
Majority		396		
Turnout		4,852	61.0	
Labour hold		Swing		
Labour hold		Swing		

=== Thorpe Hamlet ===
Thorpe Hamlet ward
Party	Candidate	Votes	%	±%
Green	Jo Henderson	1,851	33.1	−7.9
Labour	Eamonn Burgess	1,640	29.3	+6.1
Conservative	Jonathan Gillespie	1,507	26.9	+5.5
Liberal Democrats	Simon Nobbs	602	10.8	−3.5
Majority		211	3.8	
Turnout		5,600	60.3	
Green hold		Swing		

=== Town Close ===
Town Close ward
Party	Candidate	Votes	%	±%
Green	David Raby	2,205	35.7	−10.5
Labour	Jamal Sealey	1,864	30.2	+6.2
Conservative	Antony Little	1,435	23.2	+4.8
Liberal Democrats	Kirsty Webber-Walton	671	10.9	−0.5
Majority		341	5.5	
Turnout		6,175	67.3	
Green hold		Swing		

=== University ===
University ward
Party	Candidate	Votes	%	±%
Labour	Roger Ryan	2,068	48.5	−8.8
Green	Spinoza Pitman	1,130	26.5	+6.8
Conservative	Jessica Lancod-Frost	758	17.8	+4.2
Liberal Democrats	Peter Callf	304	7.1	−2.3
Majority		938	22.0	
Turnout		4,260	62.9	
Labour hold		Swing		

=== Wensum ===
Wensum ward
Party	Candidate	Votes	%	±%
Labour	Martin Peek	1,671	34.0	−4.4
Green	Ben Walker	1,555	31.7	−12.0
Conservative	Michael Lach	752	15.3	+3.0
UKIP	Dave King	703	14.3	n/a
Liberal Democrats	John Beale	232	4.7	−0.9
Majority		116	2.3	
Turnout		4,913	56.7	
Labour gain from Green		Swing		
