= 2018 Norwich City Council election =

2018 city council election for Norwich, England

← 2016	3 May 2018	2019 →

13 of 39 seats (One Third) to Norwich City Council 20 seats needed for a majority

	First party	Second party	Third party
Party	Labour	Green	Liberal Democrats
Seats before	26	10	3
Seats won	12	0	1
Seats after	31	5	3
Seat change	▲5	▼5	Steady
Popular vote	17,094	6,735	3,987
Percentage	49.2%	19.4%	11.5%
Swing	▲13.8pp	▼10.9pp	▲1.5pp
- Map showing the 2018 local election results in Norwich.^{†}As only one-third of seats were up for election, this figure indicates the total number of seats held by the party following the election to allow for year-on-year comparison.
Council control before election
Labour Party (UK)
Council control after election
Labour Party (UK)

The 2018 Norwich City Council election took place on 3 May 2018 to elect members of Norwich City Council in England. This was on the same day as other local elections. 13 of 39 seats (one-third) were up for election.

The Labour Party retained overall control of the council, winning 12 out of 13 seats up for election and 49% of the vote, their best result in over 20 years. The Greens lost every seat they were defending, whilst the Liberal Democrats retained their single seat in Eaton ward. The Conservatives once again failed to elect any councillors, although they did increase their share of the vote by 3 percentage points. As of the 2018 election, the Conservatives have not won a seat on Norwich City Council for over 10 years.

All changes in vote share are calculated with reference to the 2014 election, the last time these seats were contested.

== Background ==
In the 2016 election, the Labour Party achieved its best result in the city since 1998, winning 44% of the vote and 11 of 13 seats up for election, with the Greens dropping to their worst percentage result since 2005 (21%) and losing 4 of the 5 seats they were defending. The scale of the Labour victory was reported to have surprised both Labour and the Green Party and was partly attributed to Jeremy Corbyn's leadership of the Labour Party bringing "some voters who had previously switched to the Greens back to Labour".

The following year, in the Norfolk County Council election, Labour bucked its national trend of poor results and gained 4 seats in Norwich, all from the Green Party, leaving the Greens with no representation on the County Council for the first time since 2001. This was followed by a general election on 8 June, which saw Labour win Norwich South with 61% of the vote, with the Green Party candidate achieving a total of 3%. Labour also came within 507 votes of winning Norwich North from the Conservative Party.

== Overall result ==
Norwich City Council Election, 2018
Party	Seats	Gains	Losses	Net gain/loss	Seats %	Votes %	Votes	+/−
Labour	12	5	0	+5	92.3	49.2	17,094	+13.8
Conservative	0	0	0	0	0.0	19.7	6,841	+3.2
Green	0	0	5	-5	0.0	19.4	6,735	-10.9
Liberal Democrats	1	0	0	0	7.7	11.5	3,987	+1.5
Independent	0	0	0	0	0.0	0.3	116	New
Total	13						34,773	

Changes in vote share are relative to the last time these seats were contested in 2014.

== Council composition ==
Prior to the election the composition of the council was:

↓
26	10	3
Labour	Green	Lib Dem

After the election the composition of the council was:

↓
31	5	3
Labour	Green	Lib Dem

== Ward results ==
=== Bowthorpe ===
Bowthorpe ward
Party	Candidate	Votes	%	±%
Labour	Sue Sands	1,297	59.5	+11.6
Conservative	Andrew Roy Wiltshire	579	26.6	+2.4
Green	Jean Kathleen Bishop	173	7.9	−14.4
Liberal Democrats	Oliver Brian James Healey	131	6.0	+0.4
Majority		718	32.9	
Turnout		2,180	24.8	
Labour hold		Swing		

=== Catton Grove ===
Catton Grove ward
Party	Candidate	Votes	%	±%
Labour	Mike Stonard	1,220	51.3	+13.7
Conservative	Henry Charles Newton	809	34.0	+12.3
Green	Tony Arthur Park	196	8.2	−4.2
Liberal Democrats	Leigh John Tooke	153	6.4	+1.3
Majority		411	17.3	
Turnout		2,378		
Labour hold		Swing		

=== Crome ===
Crome ward
Party	Candidate	Votes	%	±%
Labour	Marion Frances Maxwell	1,219	58.0	+16.4
Conservative	Tom L. Sherman	592	28.2	+12.0
Green	Judith Marianne Ford	178	8.5	−1.5
Liberal Democrats	Samuel Neal	111	5.3	+2.0
Majority		627	29.8	
Turnout		2,100		
Labour hold		Swing		

=== Eaton ===
Eaton ward
Party	Candidate	Votes	%	±%
Liberal Democrats	James Wright	1,799	49.6	+12.8
Conservative	Samantha Louise England	888	24.5	−5.4
Labour	Ben Hardie	689	19.0	+0.9
Green	Jane Isobel Saunders	249	6.9	−8.3
Majority		911	25.1	
Turnout		3,625		
Liberal Democrats hold		Swing		

=== Lakenham ===
Lakenham ward
Party	Candidate	Votes	%	±%
Labour	Rachel Sarah Trevor	1,353	57.0	+22.3
Conservative	Eric Philip Ashwell Masters	475	20.0	+11.6
Liberal Democrats	Emily Rachel Cutler	307	12.9	−7.9
Green	Frederick Peter John Offord	238	10.0	−4.8
Majority		878	25.0	
Turnout		2373		
Labour hold		Swing		

=== Mancroft ===
Mancroft ward
Party	Candidate	Votes	%	±%
Labour	Jo Smith	1,248	42.6	+9.7
Green	Sandra Bogelein	1,171	40.0	−5.4
Conservative	Iain Michael Morgan Gwynn	373	12.7	−1.6
Liberal Democrats	Sarah Tustin	139	4.7	−2.7
Majority		77	2.6	
Turnout		2,931		
Labour gain from Green		Swing		

=== Mile Cross ===
Mile Cross ward
Party	Candidate	Votes	%	±%
Labour	Jacob Stephen Orlando Huntley	1,124	57.8	+17.4
Conservative	John Frederick Fisher	393	20.2	+8.2
Green	Adrian St.John Holmes	188	9.7	−10.0
Liberal Democrats	Adrian Christopher Thomas	125	6.4	+1.8
Independent	Richard Alan Edwards	116	6.0	New
Majority		731	37.6	
Turnout		1,946		
Labour hold		Swing		

=== Nelson ===
Nelson ward
Party	Candidate	Votes	%	±%
Labour	Emma Louise Hampton	1,643	47.2	+15.7
Green	Paul Vincent Neale	1,459	42.0	−11.0
Conservative	Reece Stanley Durrant	189	5.4	−2.2
Liberal Democrats	David Angus Fairbairn	185	5.3	−2.7
Majority		184	5.2	
Turnout		3,476		
Labour gain from Green		Swing		

=== Sewell ===
Sewell ward
Party	Candidate	Votes	%	±%
Labour	Matthew Robert Packer	1,652	64.5	+27.5
Conservative	Tessa Ann Jackson	431	16.8	+3.9
Green	Cami Ouzerdine	325	12.7	−14.1
Liberal Democrats	Neil Rober Hardman	155	6.0	+1.4
Majority		1,221	47.7	
Turnout		2563		
Labour hold		Swing		

=== Thorpe Hamlet ===
Thorpe Hamlet ward
Party	Candidate	Votes	%	±%
Labour	Cavan Stewart	1,277	39.7	+10.1
Green	Lesley Grahame	1,122	34.9	−7.3
Conservative	Alex Jackson-Dennis	587	18.3	−1.5
Liberal Democrats	Gordon Dean	229	7.1	−1.3
Majority		155	4.8	
Turnout		3,215		
Labour gain from Green		Swing		

=== Town Close ===
Town Close ward
Party	Candidate	Votes	%	±%
Labour	Ian Clifford Stutely	1,776	48.9	+15.5
Conservative	Mary Josephine Chacksfield	841	23.0	+4.5
Green	Nick Caistor	659	18.1	−24.0
Liberal Democrats	Silvia Schmidtova	373	10.2	+4.0
Majority		935	25.9	
Turnout				
Labour gain from Green		Swing		

=== University ===
University ward
Party	Candidate	Votes	%	±%
Labour	Matthew Fulton-McAlister	1,156	63.2	+11.4
Green	Claire Louise Stephenson	296	16.2	−13.2
Conservative	Ahmod Syed Zulkarnine	252	13.8	+1.7
Liberal Democrats	Connor Bell	125	6.8	+0.1
Majority		860	47.0	
Turnout				
Labour hold		Swing		

=== Wensum ===
Wensum ward
Party	Candidate	Votes	%	±%
Labour	Erin Victoria Fulton-McAlister	1,440	58.6	+23.0
Green	Thomas Edward Holloway	481	19.5	−28.2
Conservative	Thomas Simon Sheppard	432	17.5	+4.9
Liberal Democrats	David Thomas	113	4.6	+0.4
Majority		959	39.1	
Turnout				
Labour gain from Green		Swing		
