= 2021 Norwich City Council election =

2021 UK local government election

2021 Norwich City Council Election
← 2019	6 May 2021	2022 →

13 of the 39 seats to Norwich City Council 20 seats needed for a majority

	First party	Second party	Third party
Party	Labour	Green	Liberal Democrats
Seats before	27	9	3
Seats won	8	4	1
Seats after	26	10	3
Seat change	▼1	▲1	Steady
Popular vote	16,246	10,460	3,474
Percentage	41.6%	26.8%	8.9%
Swing	▲3.6pp	▼3.6pp	▼5.9pp
- Map showing the 2021 local election results in Norwich.
Council control before election
Labour Party (UK)
Council control after election
Labour Party (UK)

The 2021 Norwich City Council election took place on 6 May 2021 to elect members of Norwich City Council in England. This was on the same day as other local elections. 13 of 39 seats (one-third) were up for election.

== Results summary ==
2021 Norwich City Council election
Party	This election			Full council			This election		
Party	Seats	Net	Seats %	Other	Total	Total %	Votes	Votes %	+/−
Labour	8	▼1	61.5	18	26	66.7	16,246	41.6	▲3.6
Green	4	▲1	30.7	6	10	25.6	10,460	26.8	▼3.6
Conservative	0	Steady	0.0	0	0	0.0	8,559	21.9	▲7.9
Liberal Democrats	1	Steady	7.7	2	3	7.7	3,474	8.9	▼5.9
Independent	0	Steady	0.0	0	0	0.0	294	0.8	▼1.1

Changes in vote share are relative to the last time these seats were contested in 2019.

== Ward results ==
The ward results for Norwich City Council were released on 8 May 2021.

The election in Sewell ward was postponed to 17 June 2021 due to the death of a candidate standing in that ward.

=== Bowthorpe ===
Bowthorpe
Party	Candidate	Votes	%	±%
Labour	Sue Sands	1,173	51.9	+10.7
Conservative	Joshua Lowe	662	29.3	+8.6
Independent	Jonathan Watson	294	13.0	−1.8
Liberal Democrats	Sean Bennett	132	5.8	−2.1
Majority		511	22.6	—
Turnout		2,261	32.8	+4.6
Labour hold		Swing	▲1.1	

=== Catton Grove ===
Catton Grove
Party	Candidate	Votes	%	±%
Labour Co-op	Mike Stonard	1,253	47.5	+2.4
Conservative	Jonathan Gillespie	941	35.7	+9.0
Green	Tony Park	346	13.1	−5.6
Liberal Democrats	Nigel Lubbock	99	3.8	−5.7
Majority		312	11.8	—
Turnout		2,639	33.8	+6.6
Labour hold		Swing	▼3.3	

=== Crome ===
Crome
Party	Candidate	Votes	%	±%
Labour	Adam Giles	1,217	44.6	−3.9
Conservative	Steve Barber	1,065	39.0	+16.6
Green	Judith Ford	358	13.1	−8.6
Liberal Democrats	Samuel Neal	88	3.2	−4.1
Majority		152	5.6	—
Turnout		2,728	36.5	+7.9
Labour hold		Swing	▼10.3	

=== Eaton ===
Eaton
Party	Candidate	Votes	%	±%
Liberal Democrats	James Wright	1,963	44.3	−11.7
Labour	Chris Smith	1,004	22.6	+8.8
Conservative	John Ward	1,004	22.6	+4.8
Green	Jane Saunders	463	10.4	−2.0
Majority		959	21.7	—
Turnout		4,434	56.7	+6.3
Liberal Democrats hold		Swing	▼10.3	

=== Lakenham ===
Lakenham
Party	Candidate	Votes	%	±%
Labour Co-op	Rachel Everett	1,325	47.5	+11.2
Conservative	Robert Hammond	778	27.9	+16.4
Green	Sabine Virani	435	15.6	−7.4
Liberal Democrats	Paul Davies	254	9.1	−7.6
Majority		547	19.6	—
Turnout		2,792	36.4	+4.5
Labour Co-op hold		Swing	▼2.6	

=== Mancroft ===
Mancroft
Party	Candidate	Votes	%	±%
Green	Martin Schmierer	1,538	54.4	+3.6
Labour Co-op	Jo Smith	847	30.0	−2.3
Conservative	Craig Harvey	379	13.4	+3.5
Liberal Democrats	Alan Wright	62	2.2	−4.8
Majority		691	24.4	—
Turnout		2,826	40.0	+4.6
Green hold		Swing	▲3.0	

=== Mile Cross ===
Mile Cross
Party	Candidate	Votes	%	±%
Labour	Vaughan Thomas	1,124	51.6	+8.2
Conservative	Eric Masters	593	27.2	+15.8
Green	Fiona Dowson	362	16.6	−4.7
Liberal Democrats	Ian Williams	100	4.6	−4.9
Majority		531	24.4	—
Turnout		2,179	28.5	−6.9
Labour hold		Swing	▼3.8	

=== Nelson ===
Nelson
Party	Candidate	Votes	%	±%
Green	Lucy Galvin	2,434	53.5	−2.6
Labour	Lynda Groves	1,647	36.2	+4.9
Conservative	Iain Gwynn	352	7.7	+2.7
Liberal Democrats	Erlend Watson	114	2.5	−5.1
Majority		787	17.3	—
Turnout		4,547	54.1	+2.3
Green hold		Swing	▼3.8	

=== Sewell ===
The election for the Sewell ward was postponed until 17 June 2021 following the death of the Conservative candidate, Eve Collishaw.

Sewell
Party	Candidate	Votes	%	±%
Green	Gary Champion	1,154	46.1	+17.9
Labour	Laura McCartney-Gray	995	39.7	−12.9
Conservative	Simon Jones	316	12.6	+1.1
Liberal Democrats	Helen Arundell	39	1.6	−6.1
Majority		159	6.4	—
Turnout		2,504	—	—
Green gain from Labour		Swing	▲15.4	

=== Thorpe Hamlet ===
Thorpe Hamlet
Party	Candidate	Votes	%	±%
Green	Ash Haynes	1,281	41.3	−6.8
Labour	Claire Kidman	1,055	34.0	+7.7
Conservative	Simon Jones	588	19.0	+4.8
Liberal Democrats	Jeremy Hooke	124	4.0	−7.4
Independent	Ash Smith	51	1.6	New
Majority		226	7.3	—
Turnout		3,099	37.9	+0.4
Green hold		Swing	▼7.3	

=== Town Close ===
Town Close
Party	Candidate	Votes	%	±%
Labour	Ian Stutely	1,942	51.6	+6.9
Conservative	Mary Chacksfield	792	21.0	+6.3
Green	Nick Caistor	775	20.6	−4.4
Liberal Democrats	Jacob Hamilton	258	6.8	−8.8
Majority		1,150	30.6	—
Turnout		3,767	46.7	+3.2
Labour hold		Swing	▲0.3	

=== University ===
University
Party	Candidate	Votes	%	±%
Labour	Emma Hampton	1,315	53.8	+4.1
Green	Tom Holloway	506	20.7	−6.4
Conservative	Henry Lynn	483	19.7	+7.2
Liberal Democrats	Carol Chilton	142	5.8	−4.9
Majority		809	33.1	—
Turnout		2,446	32.0	+2.4
Labour hold		Swing	▲5.3	

=== Wensum ===
Wensum
Party	Candidate	Votes	%	±%
Labour Co-op	Martin Peek	1,349	47.1	−3.5
Green	Liam Calvert	808	28.2	−2.0
Conservative	David King	606	21.2	+8.6
Liberal Democrats	Gordon Dean	99	3.5	−3.1
Majority		541	18.9	—
Turnout		2,862	34.4	+4.5
Labour Co-op hold		Swing	▼1.3	
