= 2019 Norwich City Council election =

Elections in Norwhich

2019 Norwich City Council Election
← 2018	2 May 2019	2021 →

All 39 seats to Norwich City Council 20 seats needed for a majority

	First party	Second party	Third party
Party	Labour	Green	Liberal Democrats
Last election	31 seats	5 seats	3 seats
Seats won	27	9	3
Seat change	▼4	▲4	Steady
Popular vote	14,035	11,245	5,468
Percentage	38.0%	30.4%	14.8%
Swing	▼11.2pp	▲11.0pp	▲3.3pp
- Map showing the 2019 local election results in Norwich.
Council control before election
Labour Party (UK)
Council control after election
Labour Party (UK)

Elections to Norwich City Council were held on 2 May 2019. Following boundary changes, all 39 seats were put up for election, with three councillors being elected per ward using the block vote system. The election saw the Green Party reclaim five seats from the Labour Party, while losing one to Labour in Town Close. The Labour Party retained its majority on the council.

== Background ==
In the 2018 election, the Labour Party achieved its best result in the city since the 1990s, winning 49% of the vote and 12 of 13 seats up for election, with the Greens dropping to their worst percentage result since 2004 (19%) and losing all 5 seats they were defending. This followed a similar victory for Labour within Norwich in the 2017 Norfolk County Council election and the 2017 re-election of Norwich South Labour MP Clive Lewis with 61% of the vote. As a result of the 2018 election, Labour held 31 of the 39 seats - 79.5% of the total.

In late 2017, the Local Government Boundary Commission began a review of the Norwich City Council boundaries.

All councillors had to seek reelection in the 2019 Norwich City Council election, on changed boundaries, rather than the usual third of each ward.

== Summary ==
=== Results summary ===
Norwich City Council election, 2019
Party	Seats	Gains	Losses	Net gain/loss	Seats %	Votes %	Votes	+/−
Labour	27	1	5	-4	69.2	38.0	14,035	-11.2
Green	9	5	1	+4	23.1	30.4	11,245	+11.0
Liberal Democrats	3	0	0	0	7.7	14.8	5,468	+3.3
Conservative	0	0	0	0	0.0	14.0	5,162	-5.7
Independent	0	0	0	0	0.0	1.9	709	+1.6
UKIP	0	0	0	0	0.0	0.9	324	New

Changes in vote share are relative to 2018.

=== Council composition ===
Prior to the election the composition of the council was:

↓
31	5	3
Labour	Green	Lib Dem

After the election the results were as follows:

↓
27	9	3
Labour	Green	Lib Dem

== Ward results ==
=== Bowthorpe ===
Bowthorpe Ward
Party	Candidate	Votes	%	±%
Labour	Sally Ann Batton	860	45.9	
Labour	Mike Sands	838	44.7	
Labour	Sue Sands	775	41.4	
Conservative	Thomas Simon Sheppard	432	23.1	
Conservative	Anthony Daniel Little	399	21.3	
Conservative	Syed Ahmod	357	19.1	
Green	Tim Michael Jones	321	17.1	
Independent	Jon Watson	309	16.5	
Green	Jennifer Susan Ramsay	288	15.4	
Green	Sabine Virani	270	14.4	
Liberal Democrats	Danielle Engelbrecht	164	8.8	
Liberal Democrats	Samual Neal	152	8.1	
Turnout		1,874	28.2	
Labour hold				
Labour hold				
Labour hold				

=== Catton Grove ===
Catton Grove ward
Party	Candidate	Votes	%	±%
Labour	Gail Paula Harris	971	45.2	
Labour	Paul Kendrick	965	44.9	
Labour	Mike Stonard	890	41.4	
Conservative	Henry James Charles Lynn	575	26.8	
Conservative	John Elliot Tye	532	24.8	
Conservative	Roger Tubby	498	23.2	
Green	Tony Arthur Park	403	18.8	
Green	Christine Patricia Way	381	17.7	
Green	Ian Peter Chapman	334	15.5	
Liberal Democrats	Sean Timothy Bennett	205	9.5	
Liberal Democrats	Wendy Outwin	192	8.9	
Liberal Democrats	Christopher Morgan	178	8.3	
Turnout		2,149	27.2	
Labour hold				
Labour hold				
Labour hold				

=== Crome ===
Crome ward
Party	Candidate	Votes	%	±%
Labour	Alan Henry Waters	1,134	48.9	
Labour	Marion Frances Maxwell	1,105	47.6	
Labour	Adam Christopher Giles	1,052	45.3	
Conservative	Jane Mary Fisher	524	22.6	
Green	Olivia Margaret Hanks	508	21.9	
Conservative	John Hipperson	498	21.5	
Green	Judith Marianne Ford	466	20.1	
Conservative	Ethan Richard Harvey	451	19.4	
Green	Paul Meade	420	18.1	
Liberal Democrats	Alexander William Atkins	170	7.3	
Liberal Democrats	Nigel Clifford Lubbock	152	6.5	
Liberal Democrats	Joyce Pitty	137	5.9	
Turnout		2,321	28.6	
Labour hold				
Labour hold				
Labour hold				

=== Eaton ===
Eaton ward
Party	Candidate	Votes	%	±%
Liberal Democrats	Judith Lubbock	2,168	56.9	
Liberal Democrats	Caroline Sarah Ackroyd	2,129	55.8	
Liberal Democrats	James William Wright	1,963	51.5	
Conservative	Stephen Michael Edmond Bailey	690	18.1	
Conservative	Markus Andrew Eva	652	17.1	
Conservative	Mary Josephine Chacksfield	646	16.9	
Labour	Benjamin James Hardie	532	14.0	
Labour	Christopher Robin Elderton	518	13.6	
Green	Jane Isobel Saunders	479	12.6	
Labour	Christopher Douglas Smith	478	12.5	
Green	Hazel Patricia Davidson	439	11.5	
Green	David John Battye	436	11.4	
Turnout		3,812	50.4	−5.9
Liberal Democrats hold		Swing		
Liberal Democrats hold		Swing		
Liberal Democrats hold		Swing		

=== Lakenham ===
Lakenham ward
Party	Candidate	Votes	%	±%
Labour	Keith Muriel Driver	1,159	47.4	
Labour	Patrick Joan Pauline Manning	1,121	45.8	
Labour	Jane Sarmezey	1,032	42.2	
Green	Chris Hull	733	30.0	
Liberal Democrats	David Angus Fairbairn	532	21.7	
Liberal Democrats	Peter Callf	472	19.3	
Independent	Robert James Hammond	400	16.4	
Conservative	Christine Mackie	366	15.0	
Conservative	David John Mackie	315	12.9	
Conservative	Eric Phillip Ashwell Masters	303	12.4	
Turnout		2,446	31.9	−1.1
Labour hold		Swing		
Labour hold		Swing		
Labour hold		Swing		

=== Mancroft ===
Mancroft ward
Party	Candidate	Votes	%	±%
Green	Sandra Bogelein	1,308	55.1	
Green	Jamie Osborn	1,171	49.3	
Green	Martin Kenneth Albert Schmeirer	1,148	48.4	
Labour	Jo Smith	833	35.1	
Labour	David Fullman	803	33.8	
Labour	Matt Reilly	715	30.1	
Conservative	Anthony John Barton	256	10.8	
Conservative	Joanne Maria Grand	229	9.7	
Conservative	John Martyn Ward	200	8.4	
Liberal Democrats	Gordon Richard Dean	180	7.6	
Turnout		2,373	35.4	
Green gain from Labour				
Green gain from Labour				
Green hold				

=== Mile Cross ===
Mile Cross ward
Party	Candidate	Votes	%	±%
Labour	Jacob Stephen Orlando Huntley	978	49.2	
Labour	Vivien Thomas	939	47.2	
Labour	Vaughan Thomas	926	46.6	
Green	Susan Curran	480	24.1	
Green	Adrian St. John Holmes	391	19.7	
UKIP	Peter James Pyke	324	16.3	
Conservative	John Frederick Fisher	257	12.9	
Conservative	Guy Christopher James Owen	255	12.8	
Conservative	Carl Lamb	221	11.1	
Liberal Democrats	Adrian Christopher Thomas	214	10.8	
Liberal Democrats	Carol Taylor	170	8.6	
Liberal Democrats	Alistair Pitty	141	7.1	
Turnout		1,988	35.4	
Labour hold		Swing		
Labour hold		Swing		
Labour hold		Swing		

=== Nelson ===
Nelson ward
Party	Candidate	Votes	%	±%
Green	Denise Eileen Carlo	2,626	65.0	
Green	Nannette Youssef	2,316	57.3	
Green	Paul Vincent Neale	2,055	50.9	
Labour	Emma Hampton	1,464	36.2	
Labour	Hugo Malik	1,367	33.8	
Labour	Gary McGuinness	951	23.5	
Liberal Democrats	Connor Alex Bell	355	8.8	
Conservative	Richard James Gill	236	5.8	
Conservative	Danny Buck	205	5.1	
Conservative	Jo Copplestone	190	4.7	
Turnout		4,041	51.8	
Green gain from Labour		Swing		
Green gain from Labour		Swing		
Green hold		Swing		

=== Sewell ===
Sewell ward
Party	Candidate	Votes	%	±%
Labour	Julie Dawn Brociek-Coulton	1,451	56.5	
Labour	Matthew Robert Packer	1,152	44.9	
Labour	Laura Elizabeth McCartney-Gray	1,143	44.5	
Green	Simeon Jackson	779	30.4	
Green	Gary Champion	750	29.2	
Green	Aaron Stephen Fickling	581	22.6	
Conservative	Gillian Anna Ashenden	318	12.4	
Conservative	Charley Le Grice	276	10.8	
Conservative	Andrew Roy Wiltshire	252	9.8	
Liberal Democrats	Helen Arundell	212	8.3	
Liberal Democrats	Richard Smith	191	7.4	
Liberal Democrats	David Munday	139	5.4	
Turnout		2,566	33.8	
Labour hold		Swing		
Labour hold		Swing		
Labour hold		Swing		

=== Thorpe Hamlet ===
Thorpe Hamlet ward
Party	Candidate	Votes	%	±%
Green	Lesley Juliet Grahame	1,410	54.2	
Green	Ben Price	1,294	49.8	
Green	Nigel John Utton	1,096	42.1	
Labour	Rachel Charlotte Everett	770	29.6	
Labour	Cavan Stewart	753	29.0	
Labour	Deane Edward Money	650	25.0	
Conservative	Simon Mark Jones	417	16.0	
Conservative	Stephen Mark Barber	407	15.6	
Conservative	Jonathan Michael Hook	370	14.2	
Liberal Democrats	Jeremy Hooke	335	12.9	
Turnout		2,601	37.5	
Green gain from Labour		Swing		
Green hold		Swing		
Green hold		Swing		

=== Town Close ===
Town Close ward
Party	Candidate	Votes	%	±%
Labour	Karen Ann Davis	1,518	45.2	
Labour	Cate Oliver	1,415	42.1	
Labour	Ian Clifford Stutely	1,393	41.5	
Green	Nick Caistor	848	25.3	
Green	Phil Di Palma	832	24.8	
Green	Richard Andrew Bearman	789	23.5	
Liberal Democrats	Jacob Hamilton	530	15.8	
Liberal Democrats	Neil Robert Hardman	506	15.1	
Conservative	John Clarke Ward	500	14.9	
Conservative	Iain Michael Morgan Gwynn	495	14.7	
Conservative	Sarah Jane King	490	14.6	
Liberal Democrats	Silvia Schmidtova	485	14.4	
Turnout		3,358	43.5	
Labour gain from Green		Swing		
Labour hold		Swing		
Labour hold		Swing		

=== University ===
University ward
Party	Candidate	Votes	%	±%
Labour	Beth Jones	1,134	51.2	
Labour	Matthew Lewis Fulton-McAlister	1,064	48.0	
Labour	Roger John Ryan	1,036	46.8	
Green	Andrew Philip Boswell	617	27.9	
Green	Catherine Joanna Rowett	581	26.2	
Green	John Robert Greenaway	547	24.7	
Conservative	Craig Daniel James Harvey	285	12.9	
Conservative	Wini Dwebeng	262	11.8	
Liberal Democrats	Carol Chilton	244	11.0	
Conservative	Hassan Iqbal	235	10.6	
Liberal Democrats	Robert Parsons	227	10.2	
Liberal Democrats	Ian Williams	166	7.5	
Turnout		2,215	29.6	
Labour hold		Swing		
Labour hold		Swing		
Labour hold		Swing		

=== Wensum ===
Wensum ward
Party	Candidate	Votes	%	±%
Labour	Erin Fulton-McAlister	1,231	51.0	
Labour	Kevin Maguire	1,202	49.8	
Labour	Martin Peek	1,100	45.5	
Green	Liam Calvert	733	30.3	
Green	Lucy Galvin	733	30.3	
Green	Jonathan Lambert	650	26.9	
Conservative	Alice Saunders	306	12.7	
Conservative	Pete Freeman	294	12.2	
Conservative	William Oxley	273	11.3	
Liberal Democrats	Sean Laver-Vincent	161	6.7	
Liberal Democrats	Alan Wright	152	6.3	
Liberal Democrats	Nico Pili	227	9.4	
Turnout		2,416	29.9	
Labour hold		Swing		
Labour hold		Swing		
Labour hold		Swing		
