= 2014 Norwich City Council election =

2014 city council election for Norwich, England

← 2012	22 May 2014	2015 →

14 of 39 seats (One Third) to Norwich City Council 20 seats needed for a majority

	First party	Second party	Third party
Party	Labour	Green	Liberal Democrats
Seats before	21	15	3
Seats won	8	5	1
Seats after	21	15	3
Seat change	Steady	Steady	Steady
Popular vote	13,882	11,899	3,935
Percentage	35.4%	30.3%	10.0%
Swing	▲0.8pp	▲3.2pp	▼7.1pp
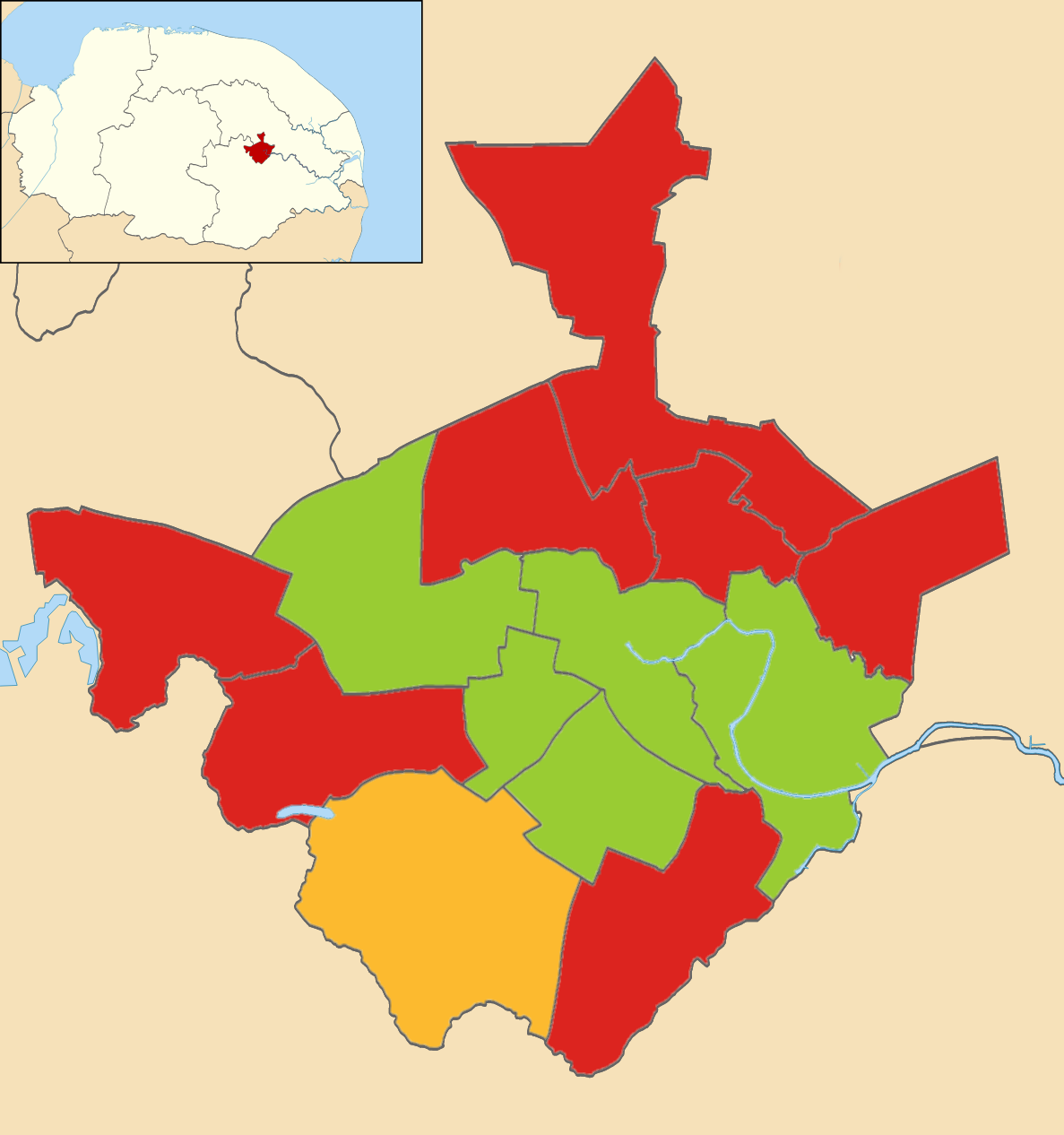
- Map showing the 2014 local election results in Norwich.
Council control before election
Labour Party (UK)
Council control after election
Labour Party (UK)

Council elections for the Norwich City Council were held on 22 May 2014 as part of the 2014 United Kingdom local elections. The elections were moved from earlier on in May to coincide with the East of England 2014 European Parliament election.

One third of the council's 39 seats were up for election in 2014, plus an extra seat in University ward, meaning a total of 14 seats in 13 wards. The other 25 seats were not contested in 2014.

The election saw no seats change hands, with the Council staying exactly as it had been in 2012. The Green Party had lost the County Council seat in Town Close ward to Labour in the 2013 election, but held their city council seat in these elections.

All changes in vote share are calculated with reference to the 2010 election, the last time these seats were contested.

== Previous composition ==
Before the election, Labour held all the seats in seven wards: Bowthorpe, Catton Grove, Chrome, Lakenham, Mile Cross, Sewell and University; the Green Party held all the seats in five wards: Mancroft, Nelson, Thorpe Hamlet, Town Close and Wensum; and the Liberal Democrats held all the seats in Eaton ward.

== Election result ==
Norwich City Council Election, 2014
Party	Seats	Gains	Losses	Net gain/loss	Seats %	Votes %	Votes	+/−
Labour	8	0	0	0	57.1	35.4	13,882	+0.8
Green	5	0	0	0	35.7	30.3	11,899	+3.2
Conservative	0	0	0	0		16.5	6,482	-2.8
Liberal Democrats	1	0	0	0	7.1	10.0	3,935	-7.1
UKIP	0	0	0	0		7.6	2,970	+5.8
Left Unity	0	0	0	0		0.2	96	N/A
Total	14	Turnout				38.1	41,378	

Changes in vote share are relative to the last time these seats were contested in 2010.

== Council composition ==
Prior to the election the composition of the council was:

↓
21	15	3
Labour	Green	Lib Dem

After the election, the composition of the council was:

↓
21	15	3
Labour	Green	Lib Dem

== Ward results ==
Below are the ward-by-ward results.

=== Bowthorpe ===
Bowthorpe
Party	Candidate	Votes	%	±%
Labour	Sue Sands	1,314	47.9	+6.6
Conservative	Paul Anthony George Wells	663	24.2	−14.9
Green	Jean Kathleen Bishop	613	22.3	+11.5
Liberal Democrats	Rod Beale	153	5.6	−3.2
Majority				
Turnout		2,743		
Labour hold		Swing		

=== Catton Grove ===
Catton Grove
Party	Candidate	Votes	%	±%
Labour Co-op	Michael John Stonard	1,026	37.6	−5.2
UKIP	Michelle Ho	664	24.3	+18.0
Conservative	Evelyn Jean Collishaw	592	21.7	−11.6
Green	Tony Arthur Park	339	12.4	+1.7
Liberal Democrats	Leigh John Tooke	107	3.9	−3.0
Majority				
Turnout		2,728		
Labour hold		Swing		

=== Crome ===
Crome
Party	Candidate	Votes	%	±%
Labour Co-op	Marion Frances Maxwell	1,071	41.6	−11.0
UKIP	Ann Doris Williams	697	27.1	n/a
Conservative	Natasha Allen	418	16.2	−10.1
Green	Judith Marianne Ford	257	10.0	+0.4
Liberal Democrats	Chris Thomas	86	3.3	−3.3
Left Unity	Julian Joseph Bell	44	1.7	n/a
Majority				
Turnout		2,573		
Labour hold		Swing		

=== Eaton ===
Eaton
Party	Candidate	Votes	%	±%
Liberal Democrats	James William Wright	1,444	36.8	−4.6
Conservative	Antony Daniel Little	1,176	29.9	+1.3
Labour	Chris Elderton	711	18.1	+1.3
Green	Jane Isobel Saunders	598	15.2	+2.0
Majority				
Turnout		3,929		
Liberal Democrats hold		Swing		

=== Lakenham ===
Lakenham
Party	Candidate	Votes	%	±%
Labour Co-op	Chris Herries	971	34.7	−1.0
UKIP	Steve Emmens	595	21.2	+16.7
Liberal Democrats	David Angus Fairbairn	584	20.8	−5.1
Green	Laura Jane Middleton	415	14.8	−9.4
Conservative	Jonathan Richard Gillespie	236	8.4	−1.3
Majority				
Turnout		2,801		
Labour hold		Swing		

=== Mancroft ===
Mancroft
Party	Candidate	Votes	%	±%
Green	Simeon Jackson	1,368	45.4	+7.8
Labour	Stephanie Ann Friend	990	32.9	+1.8
Conservative	Stefano Joseph Pollard	429	14.3	+0.2
Liberal Democrats	Caroline Elizabeth Aliwell	223	7.4	−9.8
Majority				
Turnout		3,010		
Green hold		Swing		

=== Mile Cross ===
Mile Cross
Party	Candidate	Votes	%	±%
Labour	Charmain Louise Woollard	986	40.4	−2.8
UKIP	Steven David Bradley	568	23.3	+18.4
Green	Richard Alan Edwards	481	19.7	+6.8
Conservative	Jessica Irene Victoria Lancod-Frost	292	12.0	−2.4
Liberal Democrats	Michael Anthony Sutton-Croft	112	4.6	−20.0
Majority				
Turnout				
Labour hold		Swing		

=== Nelson ===
Nelson
Party	Candidate	Votes	%	±%
Green	Tim Michael Jones	1,912	53.0	−5.5
Labour Co-op	Beth Jones	1,137	31.5	+7.4
Liberal Democrats	Ryan Jonathan Mercer	287	8.0	−0.9
Conservative	Robert Alexander Hansard	274	7.6	−0.8
Majority		775		
Turnout		3,610		
Green hold		Swing		

=== Sewell ===
Sewell
Party	Candidate	Votes	%	±%
Labour	Matthew Robert Packer	983	37.0	−2.6
Green	Matthew John Townsend	712	26.8	−3.4
UKIP	Glenn Stuart Tingle	446	16.8	+11.6
Conservative	Daniel Edward Elmer	343	12.9	−3.8
Liberal Democrats	Samuel Neal	121	4.6	−3.8
Left Unity	Karen Elaine Michael	52	2.0	n/a
Majority				
Turnout		2,657		
Labour hold		Swing		

=== Thorpe Hamlet ===
Thorpe Hamlet
Party	Candidate	Votes	%	±%
Green	Lesley Juliet Grahame	1,378	42.2	+0.9
Labour	Eamonn Patrick Burgess	968	29.6	+9.8
Conservative	Michael David Gillespie	645	19.8	+0.5
Liberal Democrats	Simon Richard Nobbs	274	8.4	−11.3
Majority				
Turnout		3,265		
Green hold		Swing		

=== Town Close ===
Town Close
Party	Candidate	Votes	%	±%
Green	Ash Haynes	1,632	42.1	+3.9
Labour Co-op	Jamal Sealey	1,289	33.2	+11.4
Conservative	Barry Cochrane	718	18.5	−0.1
Liberal Democrats	Steffan Aquarone	242	6.2	−15.2
Majority				
Turnout		3,881		
Green hold		Swing		

=== University ===
University ward elected two seats in this election, with each voter casting up to two votes under the plurality-at-large voting system.

University
Party	Candidate	Votes	%	±%
Labour	Bert Bremner	1,386	51.8	−11.6
Labour	Roger Ryan	1,016	—	—
Green	Phillip Anthony Di Palma	787	28.4	+6.1
Green	Spinoza Pitman	635	—	—
Conservative	Joe David Ferris	324	12.1	+4.5
Conservative	Hannah Emma Wiltshire	296	—	—
Liberal Democrats	Tom Crisp	179	6.7	±0.0
Liberal Democrats	Philip Jimenez	167	—	—
Majority				
Turnout		4,790		
Labour hold		Swing		
Labour hold		Swing		

=== Wensum ===
Wensum
Party	Candidate	Votes	%	±%
Green	Sandra Bogelein	1,407	47.7	+4.1
Labour	Martin Alan Peek	1,050	35.6	−0.9
Conservative	James Kenneth Wight	372	12.6	+1.2
Liberal Democrats	Helen Anne Whitworth	123	4.2	−4.3
Majority		357		
Turnout		2,952		
Green hold		Swing		
