= 2010 Norwich City Council election =

2010 city council election for Norwich, England

← 2008	9 September 2010	2011 →

13 of 39 seats (One Third) to Norwich City Council 20 seats needed for a majority

	First party	Second party
Party	Labour	Green
Seats before	15	13
Seats won	7	5
Seats after	16	14
Seat change	▲1	▲1
Popular vote	9,906	7,761
Percentage	34.6%	27.1%
Swing	▲6.8%	▲2.6%
	Third party	Fourth party
Party	Liberal Democrats	Conservative
Seats before	6	5
Seats won	1	0
Seats after	5	4
Seat change	▼1	▼1
Popular vote	4,910	5,532
Percentage	17.1%	19.3%
Swing	▼9.8%	▲0.2%
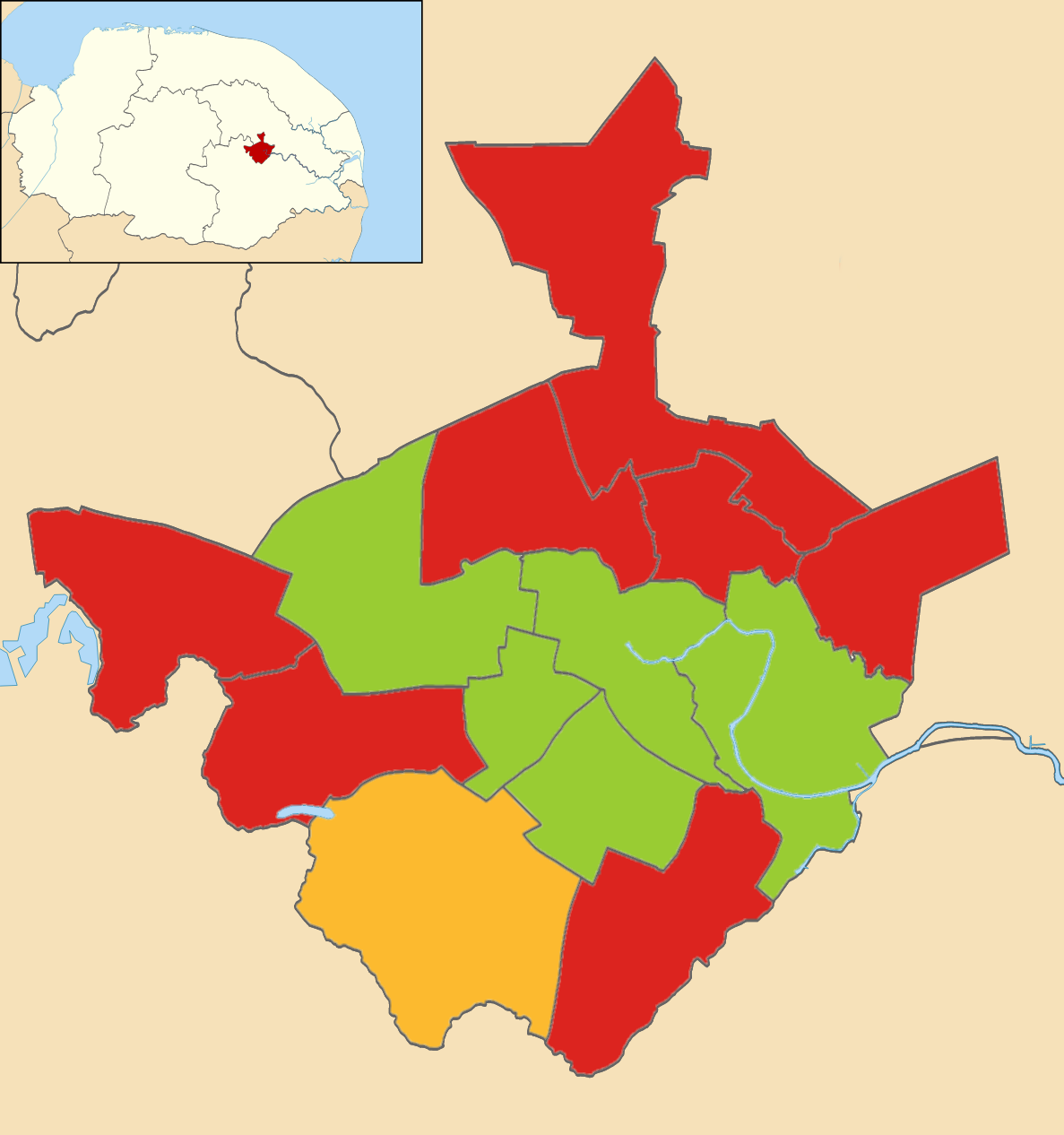
- Map showing the 2010 local election results in Norwich.
Council control before election
No Overall Control
Council control after election
No Overall Control

The 2010 Norwich City Council election took place on 9 September 2010 to elect members of Norwich City Council in England. One third of seats were up for election. The elections took place later in the year than other local elections. Norwich had previously been granted permission to become a unitary authority, with local elections postponed until 2011. When the Coalition Government won the general election earlier that year, Norwich's permission to form a unitary authority was overturned. Because of this, the High Court ruled that those councillors who had stayed on beyond their four-year term were no longer constitutionally elected, and would need to seek re-election. This resulted in there being an election in every ward in September to renew the mandate for the wards.

All changes in vote share are calculated with reference to the 2006 election, the last time these seats were contested.

== Election result ==
Norwich City Council election, 2010
Party	Seats	Gains	Losses	Net gain/loss	Seats %	Votes %	Votes	+/−
Labour	7	1	0	+1	53.8	34.6	9,906	+6.8
Green	5	1	0	+1	38.5	27.1	7,761	+2.6
Conservative	0	0	1	-1	−	19.3	5,532	+0.2
Liberal Democrats	1	0	1	-1	7.7	17.1	4,910	-9.8
UKIP	0	−	−	−	−	1.8	529	+1.5
Total	13	Turnout				28.1	28,638	

Changes in vote share are relative to the last time these seats were contested in 2006.

== Council Composition ==
Prior to the election the composition of the council was:

↓
15	13	6	5
Labour	Green	Lib Dem	Con

After the election, the composition of the council was:

↓
16	14	5	4
Labour	Green	Lib Dem	Con

== Ward results ==
=== Bowthorpe ===
Bowthorpe
Party	Candidate	Votes	%	±%
Labour	Jo Storie	862	41.3	+5.8
Conservative	Anthony Little	816	39.1	−6.9
Green	Jean Bishop	225	10.8	+0.6
Liberal Democrats	Peter Perrett	184	8.8	+1.7
Majority		46	2.2	—
Labour gain from Conservative		Swing	▲6.4	

=== Catton Grove ===
Catton Grove
Party	Candidate	Votes	%	±%
Labour	Julie Westmacott	835	42.8	+8.0
Conservative	Charlotte Casimir	650	33.3	−6.7
Green	Rebecca Smith	208	10.7	−3.3
Liberal Democrats	Christopher Thomas	135	6.9	−4.2
UKIP	Paul Williams	123	6.3	N/A
Majority		185	9.5	—
Labour hold		Swing	▲7.4	

=== Crome ===
Crome
Party	Candidate	Votes	%	±%
Labour	Jenny Lay	1,085	55.2	+13.3
Conservative	Christopher Baxter	543	27.6	−3.3
Green	Paul McAlenan	199	10.1	−5.2
Liberal Democrats	Alexander Findlow	137	7.0	−5.0
Majority		542	26.3	+15.3
Labour hold		Swing	▲8.3	

=== Eaton ===
Eaton
Party	Candidate	Votes	%	±%
Liberal Democrats	James Wright	1,356	41.4	−5.3
Conservative	Tak-Man Li	937	28.6	−7.9
Labour	Benjamin Dilks	549	16.8	+9.0
Green	Nicholas Clinch	431	13.2	+4.2
Majority		419	12.8	+2.6
Liberal Democrats hold		Swing	▲1.3	

=== Lakenham ===
Lakenham
Party	Candidate	Votes	%	±%
Labour	Victoria MacDonald	899	35.7	+6.6
Liberal Democrats	Howard Lee	652	25.9	−15.9
Green	Kit Jones	608	24.2	+14.8
Conservative	Christopher Benjamin	243	9.7	−1.7
UKIP	Steve Emmens	113	4.5	−3.9
Majority		247	9.8	—
Labour hold		Swing	▲11.3	

=== Mancroft ===
Mancroft
Party	Candidate	Votes	%	±%
Green	Graeme Gee	813	37.6	−5.5
Labour	Marion Maxwell	673	31.1	+7.6
Liberal Democrats	Simon Nobbs	371	17.2	+3.1
Conservative	Suzie Pulford	305	14.1	−5.2
Majority		140	6.5	−13.2
Green hold		Swing	▼6.6	

=== Mile Cross ===
Mile Cross
Party	Candidate	Votes	%	±%
Labour	Viv Thomas	797	43.2	+4.0
Liberal Democrats	Carl Mayhew	455	24.6	+2.5
Conservative	Oscar Pinnington	266	14.4	−7.9
Green	Jo Henderson	238	12.9	−3.5
UKIP	Richard Crooks	90	4.9	N/A
Majority		342	18.6	+1.7
Labour hold		Swing	▲0.8	

=== Nelson ===
Nelson
Party	Candidate	Votes	%	±%
Green	Claire Stephenson	1,297	58.5	−6.8
Labour	Marian Chapman	535	24.1	+11.8
Liberal Democrats	Mark Johnston	198	8.9	−3.3
Conservative	Stefan Rose	186	8.4	−1.3
Majority		762	34.4	−18.6
Green hold		Swing	▼9.3	

=== Sewell ===
Sewell
Party	Candidate	Votes	%	±%
Labour	Sue Sands	792	39.6	+10.2
Green	Jessica Goldfinch	604	30.2	+5.4
Conservative	David Mackie	333	16.7	−1.5
Liberal Democrats	Selwyn Taylor	168	8.4	−4.0
UKIP	Glenn Tingle	103	5.2	N/A
Majority		188	9.4	+4.8
Labour hold		Swing	▲2.4	

=== Thorpe Hamlet ===
Thorpe Hamlet
Party	Candidate	Votes	%	±%
Green	Lesley Grahame	859	41.3	−4.8
Labour	Shane Mann	412	19.8	+9.5
Liberal Democrats	Dave Thomas	409	19.7	−9.4
Conservative	Hannah Feiner	401	19.3	+9.0
Majority		447	21.5	+4.5
Green gain from Liberal Democrats		Swing	▼7.2	

=== Town Close ===
Town Close
Party	Candidate	Votes	%	±%
Green	Ash Haynes	983	38.2	−3.7
Labour	Gareth Hardy	560	21.8	+6.4
Liberal Democrats	Sam Bailey	550	21.4	−2.5
Conservative	Eileen Wyatt	479	18.6	−0.2
Majority		423	16.4	−1.7
Green hold		Swing	▼5.1	

=== University ===
University
Party	Candidate	Votes	%	±%
Labour	Bert Bremner	1,164	63.4	+20.0
Green	Sue Carpenter	409	22.3	−6.9
Conservative	Nicholas Hindley	140	7.6	−6.1
Liberal Democrats	James Ebelewicz	123	6.7	−7.0
Majority		755	41.1	+26.9
Labour hold		Swing	▲13.5	

=== Wensum ===
Wensum
Party	Candidate	Votes	%	±%
Green	Steven Altman	887	43.6	−7.0
Labour	Thomas Vaughan	743	36.5	+12.0
Conservative	Stephen Karanicholas	233	11.4	−3.0
Liberal Democrats	Clare Dennis	172	8.5	−2.0
Majority		144	7.1	−19.1
Green hold		Swing	▼9.5	
