= 2026 Norwich City Council election =

2026 English local government election

- 7 May 2026

14 out of 39 seats to Norwich City Council (including 1 by-election) 20 seats needed for a majority
	First party	Second party	Third party
Leader	Lucy Galvin	Mike Stonard	James Wright
Party	Green	Labour	Liberal Democrats
Last election	15 seats, 31.8%	19 seats, 40.0%	3 seats, 11.4%
Seats before	16	19	3
Seats won	11	0	1
Seats after	21	12	3
Seat change	▲5	▼7	Steady
Popular vote	21,981	10,145	4,415
Percentage	44.0%	20.3%	8.8%
Swing	▲12.2%	▼19.7%	▼2.6%
	Fourth party	Fifth party
Party	Reform	Independent
Last election	0 seats, 1.8%	2 seats, 1.8%
Seats before	0	1
Seats won	2	0
Seats after	2	1
Seat change	▲2	Steady
Popular vote	10,324	Did not stand
Percentage	20.7%	Did not stand
Swing	▲18.9%	▼4.4%
- Winner of each seat at the 2026 Norwich City Council election.
Leader before election
Mike Stonard
Labour
No overall control (Note: Labour minority.)
Leader after election
Lucy Galvin
Green

The 2026 Norwich City Council election took place on 7 May 2026 to elect members of Norwich City Council in Norfolk, England. This was on the same day as other local elections.

Prior to the election, the council was under no overall control, being run by a Labour minority administration. At the election, the Green Party won a majority, which was the first time the party had taken control of the council. Green councillor Lucy Galvin was formally appointed as the new leader of the council at the subsequent annual council meeting on 19 May 2026.

== Summary ==
=== Council composition ===
After 2024 election		Before 2026 election	
Party	Seats	Party	Seats
Labour	19	Labour	19
Green	15	Green	16
Liberal Democrats	3	Liberal Democrats	3
Independent	2	Independent	1

Changes 2024–2026:

- March 2025: Gillian Francis (Green), Jamie Osborn (Green), Peter Prinsley (Labour) resign – by-elections held May 2025
- May 2025: Jenny Knight (Green), Richard Lawes (Labour) and Ian Stutely (Green) win by-elections
- October 2025: Cate Oliver (Independent, elected as Labour) joins Greens

=== Election result ===
2026 Norwich City Council election
Party	This election				Full council			This election		
Party	Candidates	Seats	Net	Seats %	Other	Total	Total %	Votes	Votes %	+/−
Green	14	11	▲5	78.6	10	21	55.0	21,981	44.0	+12.2
Labour	14	0	▼7	0.0	12	12	30.0	10,145	20.3	–19.7
Liberal Democrats	14	1	Steady	7.1	2	3	7.5	4,415	8.8	–2.6
Reform	14	2	▲2	14.3	0	2	5.0	10,324	20.7	+18.9
Independent	0	0	Steady	0.0	1	1	2.5	N/A (Note: Did not stand candidatess.)	N/A	–4.4
Conservative	14	0	Steady	0.0	0	0	0.0	2,979	6.0	–4.3
British Democrats	1	0	Steady	0.0	0	0	0.0	77	0.2	N/A
Communist	1	0	Steady	0.0	0	0	0.0	45	0.1	–0.2

== Incumbents ==
Ward	Incumbent councillor	Party	Re-standing
Bowthorpe	Mike Sands	Labour	Yes
Catton Grove	Paul Kendrick	Labour	No
Crome	Claire Kidman	Labour	Yes
Eaton	Caroline Ackroyd	Liberal Democrats	Yes
Lakenham	Gurpreet Padda	Labour	Yes
Mancroft	Ian Stutely (Note: Elected at the 2025 Mancroft by-election.)	Green	Yes
Mile Cross	Vivien Thomas	Labour	No
Nelson	Julie Young	Green	No
Sewell	Alex Catt	Green	No
Thorpe Hamlet	Ben Price	Green	Yes (Note: Stood in Wensum ward.)
Town Close	Cate Oliver (Note: Originally elected as Labour, but later defected to the Green Party.)	Green	Yes
University	Matthew Fulton-McAlister	Labour	No
Wensum	Kevin Maguire	Labour	Yes

== Ward results ==
=== Bowthorpe ===
Bowthorpe
Party	Candidate	Votes	%	±%
Green	Amber Smith	980	34.6	▲23.0
Reform	Nick Taylor	898	31.7	N/A
Labour	Mike Sands	673	23.8	▼38.1
Conservative	Rebeka Jones	170	6.0	▼11.6
Liberal Democrats	Neil Hardman	110	3.9	▼5.0
Majority		82	2.9	N/A
Turnout		2,831		
Green gain from Labour				

=== Catton Grove ===
Catton Grove
Party	Candidate	Votes	%	±%
Reform	Mike Conroy	969	30.5	N/A
Green	Tony Park	910	28.6	+9.4
Labour Co-op	George Heaney	857	27.0	–26.5
Conservative	Samuel Walker	273	8.6	–12.8
Liberal Democrats	Nigel Lubbock	168	5.3	–0.6
Majority		59	1.9	N/A
Turnout		3,177		
Reform gain from Labour Co-op				

=== Crome ===
Crome
Party	Candidate	Votes	%	±%
Reform	Tim Day	1,143	33.9	+22.9
Labour	Claire Kidman	968	28.7	–24.6
Green	Richard Edwards	735	21.8	+7.3
Conservative	James Tod	285	8.5	–8.2
Liberal Democrats	Philip Jimenez	159	4.7	+0.3
British Democrats	Kai Stephens	77	2.3	N/A
Majority		175	5.2	N/A
Turnout		3,367		
Reform gain from Labour		Swing	▲23.8	

=== Eaton ===
Eaton
Party	Candidate	Votes	%	±%
Liberal Democrats	Caroline Ackroyd	2,169	45.9	–8.2
Green	Jane Saunders	896	19.0	+6.3
Reform	Thomas Waterhouse	723	15.3	N/A
Labour	Bert Bremner	568	12.0	–9.1
Conservative	Iain Gwynn	367	7.8	–4.4
Majority		1,273	26.9	–6.1
Turnout		4,723		
Liberal Democrats hold		Swing	▼7.3	

=== Lakenham ===
Lakenham
Party	Candidate	Votes	%	±%
Green	Ashlee Jones	1,304	39.2	▲20.8
Reform	Richard Eminson	840	25.2	N/A
Labour	Gurpreet Padda	826	24.8	▼33.4
Conservative	Robert Hammond	202	6.1	▼6.2
Liberal Democrats	Carol Chilton	158	4.7	▼1.4
Majority		464	14.0	N/A
Turnout		3,330		
Green gain from Labour				

=== Mancroft ===
Mancroft
Party	Candidate	Votes	%	±%
Green	Ian Stutely	1,784	58.3	▲3.5
Reform	Mark Tucker	575	18.8	N/A
Labour	Cavan Stewart	377	12.3	▼14.1
Conservative	Sing Lee	173	5.7	▼2.6
Liberal Democrats	Clara Lynch	150	4.9	▲1.5
Majority		1,209	39.5	▲4.1
Turnout		3,059		
Green hold				

=== Mile Cross ===
Mile Cross
Party	Candidate	Votes	%	±%
Green	Georgia Brumby	1,503	50.1	▲7.4
Reform	Craig Barker	878	29.3	▲22.9
Labour	Sevi Marshall	382	12.7	▼27.2
Conservative	Georgi Dimitrov	145	4.8	▼1.3
Liberal Democrats	Sean Bennett	90	3.0	▼0.1
Majority		625	20.8	▲18.0
Turnout		2,998		
Green gain from Labour		Swing	▼7.8	

=== Nelson ===
Nelson
Party	Candidate	Votes	%	±%
Green	Denise Carlo	3,138	65.7	▲8.7
Labour	Michael Howard	901	18.9	▼13.6
Reform	Richard Edmunds	343	7.2	N/A
Liberal Democrats	Marlowe North	189	4.0	▲0.8
Conservative	John Ward	159	3.3	▼0.8
Communist	James Nutman	45	0.9	▼2.3
Majority		2,237	46.8	▲22.3
Turnout		4,775		
Green hold		Swing	▲11.2	

=== Sewell ===
Sewell
Party	Candidate	Votes	%	±%
Green	Sophia Corte	2,405	63.4	▲5.0
Reform	Alexander Stevens	557	14.7	▲11.0
Labour	Michelle Gregory	542	14.3	▼16.5
Liberal Democrats	Helen Arundell	146	3.8	▲1.2
Conservative	Christine Mackie	146	3.8	▼0.7
Majority		1,848	48.7	▲21.1
Turnout		3,796		
Green hold		Swing	▼3.0	

=== Thorpe Hamlet ===
Thorpe Hamlet
Party	Candidate	Votes	%	±%
Green	Bliss Wylie	1,622	43.1	▼1.6
Labour	Jane Overhill	1,112	29.6	▼10.0
Reform	Stephen Bailey	590	15.7	N/A
Conservative	Simon Jones	281	7.5	▼4.0
Liberal Democrats	Jeremy Hooke	154	4.1	▼0.1
Majority		510	13.5	▲8.4
Turnout		3,759		
Green hold		Swing	▲4.2	

=== Town Close ===
Town Close
Party	Candidate	Votes	%	±%
Green	Cate Oliver	1,973	45.8	N/A
Labour Co-op	Lisa Alston	1,313	30.5	▼11.3
Reform	Mark Broome	526	12.2	N/A
Conservative	Mary Chacksfield	309	7.2	▼5.3
Liberal Democrats	David Fairbairn	185	4.3	▼1.0
Majority		660	15.3	▲13.9
Turnout		4,306		
Green hold				

=== University ===
University
Party	Candidate	Votes	%	±%
Green	Tammy Searle	1,384	43.0	▲23.6
Reform	Jenny Ashburn	672	20.9	N/A
Labour Co-op	Matthew Ainsley	578	17.9	▼30.5
Liberal Democrats	James Hawketts	455	14.1	▼11.3
Conservative	Patricia Menaul	132	4.1	▼2.7
Majority		712	22.1	▼0.9
Turnout		3,221		
Green gain from Labour Co-op				

=== Wensum ===
Wensum (2 seats due to by-election)
Party	Candidate	Votes	%	±%
Green	Tom Butterworth	1,706	51.5	▲2.2
Green	Ben Price	1,641	49.5	▲0.2
Reform	Joe Skipper	818	24.7	▲19.9
Reform	Kevin Spilling	792	23.9	▲19.1
Labour	Kevin Maguire*	534	16.1	▼21.3
Labour	Maggie Wheeler	514	15.5	▼21.9
Conservative	John Fisher	186	5.6	±0.0
Liberal Democrats	Gordon Dean	161	4.9	▲2.0
Conservative	Andrew Hadley	151	4.6	▼1.0
Liberal Democrats	Alan Wright	121	3.7	▲0.8
Turnout		~3,312		
Green hold				
Green gain from Labour				
