= 2012 Norwich City Council election =

2012 city council election for Norwich, England

← 2011	3 May 2012	2014 →

15 of 39 seats to Norwich City Council 20 seats needed for a majority

	First party	Second party	Third party
Party	Labour	Green	Liberal Democrats
Seats before	18	15	4
Seats won	8	6	1
Seats after	21	15	3
Seat change	▲3	Steady	▼1
Popular vote	12,854	9,847	4,215
Percentage	39.7%	30.4%	13.0%
Swing	▲14.8pp	▲1.4pp	▼6.7pp
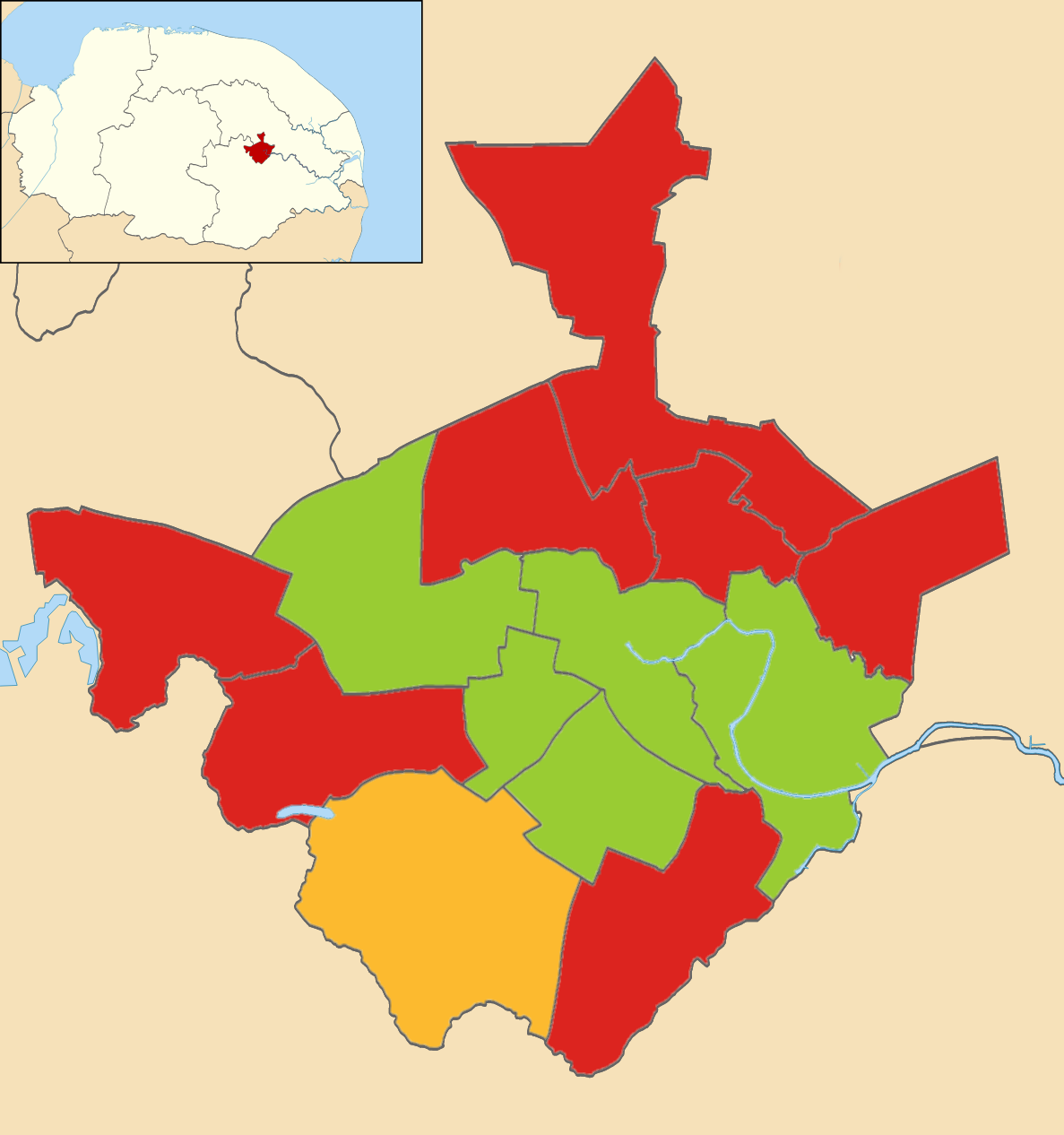
- Map showing the 2012 local election results in Norwich.
Council control before election
No Overall Control
Council control after election
Labour Party (UK)

Elections to Norwich City Council took place on 3 May 2012, the same day as other 2012 United Kingdom local elections. Fifteen out of thirty-nine council seats were up for election and the Labour Party gained control of the council from No Overall Control.

The Green Party held firm, while the Liberal Democrats and Conservatives suffered losses.

The Liberal Democrats lost their last seat in Lakenham to Labour, meaning that they now only held seats in the affluent Eaton ward. Former Liberal Democrat Group leader, Judith Lubbock held Eaton convincingly.

After the election, the composition of the council was as follows:

- Labour 21 (+3)
- Green 15 (no change)
- Liberal Democrat 3 (-1)
- Conservative 0 (-2)

All changes in vote share are calculated with reference to the 2008 election, the last time these seats were contested.

== Election result ==
Norwich City Council Election, 2012
Party	Seats	Gains	Losses	Net gain/loss	Seats %	Votes %	Votes	+/−
Labour	8	3	0	+3	53.3	39.7	12,854	+14.8
Green	6	−	−	−	40.0	30.3	9,847	+1.4
Conservative	0	0	2	-2	−	16.3	5,285	-6.7
Liberal Democrats	1	0	1	-1	6.7	13.0	4,215	-8.4
UKIP	0	−	−	−	−	0.7	215	±0.0
Total	15	Turnout				31.7%	32,416	

== Council composition ==
Prior to the election the composition of the council was:

↓
18	15	4	2
Labour	Green	Lib Dem	Con

After the election, the composition of the council was:

↓
21	15	3
Labour	Green	Lib Dem

== Ward results ==
=== Bowthorpe ===
Bowthorpe
Party	Candidate	Votes	%	±%
Labour	Sally Button	1,268	54.7	+8.9
Conservative	Stuart Taylor	585	25.2	−9.7
Green	Jean Bishop	350	15.1	+1.6
Liberal Democrats	Haydn Perrett	117	5.0	−0.7
Majority		683	29.5	+18.6
Turnout		2,320	27.7	−8.1
Labour gain from Conservative		Swing	▲9.3	

=== Catton Grove ===
Catton Grove (2 seats due to by-election)
Party	Candidate	Votes	%	±%
Labour	Gail Harris	1,036	47.2	+4.4
Labour	Mike Stonard	978		
Conservative	Evelyn Collishaw	703	32.0	−1.2
Conservative	Paul Holmes	629		
Green	Judith Ford	331	15.1	+4.9
Green	Tony Park	312		
Liberal Democrats	Leigh Tooke	124	5.7	−1.2
Liberal Democrats	Alexander Findlow	111		
Turnout			28.1	−7.2
Labour gain from Conservative				
Labour hold				

=== Crome ===
Crome
Party	Candidate	Votes	%	±%
Labour	David Bradford	1,272	61.8	+9.4
Conservative	Jessica Lancod-Frost	388	18.9	−5.8
Green	Christine Way	273	13.3	+3.6
Liberal Democrats	James Cross	125	6.1	+0.7
Majority		884	42.9	+15.2
Turnout		2,058	28.8	−9.4
Labour hold		Swing	▲7.6	

=== Eaton ===
Eaton
Party	Candidate	Votes	%	±%
Liberal Democrats	Judith Lubbock	1,820	47.6	+13.4
Conservative	Antony Little	947	24.8	−6.4
Labour	Geraldine Waring	677	17.7	−4.1
Green	Susan Curran	379	9.9	−2.9
Majority		873	22.8	+19.8
Turnout		3,823	52.4	−6.2
Liberal Democrats hold		Swing	▲9.9	

=== Lakenham ===
Lakenham
Party	Candidate	Votes	%	±%
Labour	Patrick Manning	1,149	45.6	+4.0
Liberal Democrats	David Fairbairn	658	26.1	+4.8
Green	Nick Bishop	361	14.3	−4.2
UKIP	Steve Emmens	215	8.5	+1.8
Conservative	Mathew Morris	135	5.4	−6.4
Majority		491	19.5	−0.8
Turnout		2,518	35.1	−6.5
Labour gain from Liberal Democrats		Swing	▼0.4	

=== Mancroft ===
Mancroft
Party	Candidate	Votes	%	±%
Green	Lucy Howard	1,077	42.8	+1.3
Labour	Marion Maxwell	943	37.5	+4.1
Conservative	Oliver Watson	288	11.5	−3.5
Liberal Democrats	Simon Nobbs	207	8.2	−1.9
Majority		134	5.3	−2.8
Turnout		2,515	31.3	−9.7
Green hold		Swing	▼1.4	

=== Mile Cross ===
Mile Cross
Party	Candidate	Votes	%	±%
Labour	Deborah Gihawi	1,019	54.8	+3.8
Green	Richard Edwards	409	22.0	+7.8
Conservative	Oscar Pinnington	267	16.0	−2.5
Liberal Democrats	Ian Williams	134	7.2	−4.8
Majority		610	32.8	+0.3
Turnout		1,829	24.2	−7.8
Labour hold		Swing	▼2.0	

=== Nelson ===
Nelson
Party	Candidate	Votes	%	±%
Green	David Rogers	1,644	59.5	+4.7
Labour	Stuart Goodman	697	25.2	−1.0
Conservative	Alexandra Davies	249	9.0	−2.3
Liberal Democrats	Katie Atkins	173	6.3	−1.4
Majority		947	34.3	+5.7
Turnout		2,763	36.8	−12.7
Green hold		Swing	▲2.9	

=== Sewell ===
Sewell
Party	Candidate	Votes	%	±%
Labour	Kevin Barker	990	46.2	+5.0
Green	Howard Jago	700	32.6	+7.6
Conservative	Anthony Barton	332	15.5	−4.4
Liberal Democrats	Chris Thomas	123	5.7	−2.7
Majority		290	13.6	−2.6
Turnout		2,145	28.0	−10.2
Labour hold		Swing	▼1.3	

=== Thorpe Hamlet ===
Thorpe Hamlet
Party	Candidate	Votes	%	±%
Green	Ben Price	1,111	42.7	+3.4
Labour	Tony Waring	793	30.5	+6.6
Conservative	Stefan Rose	437	16.8	−5.2
Liberal Democrats	Jeremy Hooke	260	10.0	−4.7
Majority		318	12.2	−3.2
Turnout		2,601	30.2	−7.7
Green hold		Swing	▼1.6	

=== Town Close ===
Town Close
Party	Candidate	Votes	%	±%
Green	Paul Neale	1,333	46.2	+2.0
Labour	John Sailing	818	28.3	+3.5
Conservative	Guy Owen	481	16.7	−2.4
Liberal Democrats	Mark Johnston	254	8.8	−2.8
Majority		515	17.9	−1.5
Turnout		2,886	33.9	−12.5
Green hold		Swing	▼0.8	

=== University ===
University
Party	Candidate	Votes	%	±%
Labour	Brenda Arthur	1,153	57.0	−0.2
Green	Robert Laird	493	24.4	+4.7
Conservative	Thomas Cannon	246	12.2	−1.4
Liberal Democrats	Andrew Wright	129	6.4	−3.0
Majority		660	32.6	−5.0
Turnout		2,021	26.5	−4.8
Labour hold		Swing	▼2.5	

=== Wensum ===
Wensum (2 seats due to by-election)
Party	Candidate	Votes	%	±%
Green	Neil Blunt	1,386	51.1	+7.4
Green	Caroline Brimblecombe	1,276		
Labour	Vaughan Thomas	1,039	38.3	−0.1
Labour	Samuel Earl	1,012		
Conservative	Hannah Gascoigne	196	7.2	−5.1
Conservative	Simon Harrison	189		
Liberal Democrats	Jess Hallybone	91	3.4	−2.2
Liberal Democrats	Helen Whitworth	78		
Turnout			33.2	−7.1
Green hold				
Green hold				
