= 2011 Norwich City Council election =

2011 city council election for Norwich, England

← 2010	5 May 2011	2012 →

13 of 39 seats (One Third) to Norwich City Council 20 seats needed for a majority
	First party	Second party
Party	Labour	Green
Seats before	16	14
Seats won	7	5
Seats after	18	15
Seat change	▲2	▲1
Popular vote	14,990	11,388
Percentage	36.8%	28.0%
Swing	▲7.9%	▲1.2%
	Third party	Fourth party
Party	Liberal Democrats	Conservative
Seats before	5	4
Seats won	1	0
Seats after	4	2
Seat change	▼1	▼2
Popular vote	5,101	8,345
Percentage	12.5%	20.5%
Swing	▼10.6%	▲0.2%
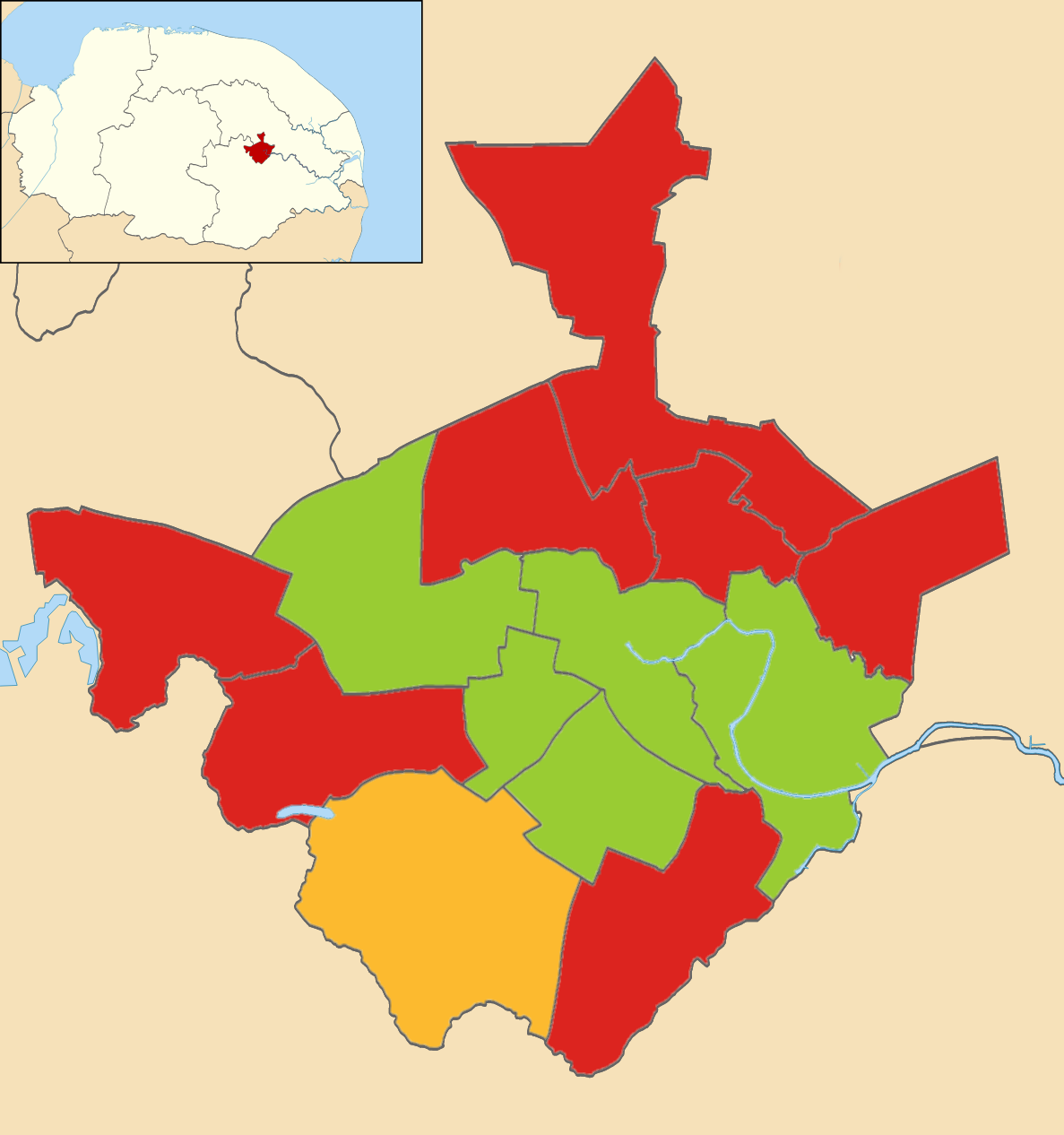
- Map showing the 2011 local election results in Norwich.
Council control before election
No Overall Control
Council control after election
No Overall Control

The 2011 Norwich City Council election took place on 5 May 2011 to elect members of Norwich City Council in England. One third of seats were up for election. This was on the same day as other local elections and the nationwide referendum on the Alternative Vote.

All changes in vote share are calculated with reference to the 2007 election, the last time these seats were contested.

== Summary ==
Labour gained Bowthorpe and Catton Grove from the Conservatives, while the Greens seized Thorpe Hamlet from the Liberal Democrats.

- Labour performed best against the Conservatives in their target seats, although they fell short in Wensum and Mancroft as the Green Party's support held up well. The one Green Party gain came in Thorpe Hamlets against the Liberal Democrats, where their triumph meant all three of the ward's seats were now held by them.
- Despite their vote increasing on the previous elections in September 2010, the Conservatives still lost the only two seats they were defending. Disappointing for them, their support rose in all but one of the seats they did not hold previously, while their support fell in the seats they were defending, Bowthorpe and Catton Grove.
- As in the previous election, the Liberal Democrats were relegated to Eaton, while their support across the rest of the city fell sharply.

In the affluent south west of the city, the Conservatives and Liberal Democrats had fought very hard to win Eaton following the decision of sitting Liberal Democrat Councillor, Ros Wright (wife of Norwich South MP Simon Wright), to stand down. The Liberal Democrats held on with Caroline Ackroyd securing a majority of 129, although there was a 4.9% swing to the Conservative candidate Chris Groves. Turnout was once again the highest in the city at 58.6%.

After the election, the new makeup of the City Council was:

- Labour 18 (+2)
- Greens 15 (+1)
- Liberal Democrats 4 (-1)
- Conservatives 2 (-2)

Turnout across the city was 40.2%, with the AV Referendum being seen as partly responsible for the marked rise.

== Election result ==
Norwich City Council Election, 2011
Party	Seats	Gains	Losses	Net gain/loss	Seats %	Votes %	Votes	+/−
Labour	7	2	0	+2	53.8	36.8	14,990	+7.9
Green	5	1	0	+1	38.5	28.0	11,388	+1.2
Conservative	0	0	2	-2	0.0	20.5	8,345	+0.2
Liberal Democrats	1	0	1	-1	7.7	12.5	5,101	-10.6
UKIP	0	0	0	0	0.0	2.2	904	+1.3

Changes in vote share are relative to the last time these seats were contested in 2007.

== Council composition ==
Prior to the election the composition of the council was:

↓
16	14	5	4
Labour	Green	Lib Dem	Con

After the election, the composition of the council was:

↓
18	15	4	2
Labour	Green	Lib Dem	Con

== Ward results ==
=== Bowthorpe ===
Bowthorpe
Party	Candidate	Votes	%	±%
Labour	Mike Sands	1,381	45.8	+8.1
Conservative	Andrew Wiltshire	1,053	34.9	−3.2
Green	Jean Kathleen Bishop	406	13.5	+0.3
Liberal Democrats	Haydn Perrett	173	5.7	−5.3
Majority		328	10.9	
Turnout		3,013	35.8	
Labour gain from Conservative		Swing	+5.7	

=== Catton Grove ===
Catton Grove
Party	Candidate	Votes	%	±%
Labour	Paul Kendrick	1,152	42.8	+6.1
Conservative	Evelyn Jean Collishaw	922	33.2	−8.8
Green	Lee Claire Cozens	284	10.2	−2.9
UKIP	Paul Williams	221	8.0	n/a
Liberal Democrats	Chris Thomas	196	6.9	−1.2
Majority		230	9.6	
Turnout		2775	35.3	
Labour gain from Conservative		Swing		

=== Crome ===
Crome
Party	Candidate	Votes	%	±%
Labour	Alan Henry Waters	1450	52.4	+8.0
Conservative	Christopher John Baxter	684	24.7	−2.7
Green	Christine Patricia Way	267	9.7	−2.4
UKIP	Wendy Jane Atkinson	217	7.8	n/a
Liberal Democrats	Alexander Lofgren Findlow	148	5.4	−10.7
Majority		766	27.7	
Turnout		2766	38.2	
Labour hold		Swing		

=== Eaton ===
Eaton
Party	Candidate	Votes	%	±%
Liberal Democrats	Caroline Sarah Ackroyd	1,467	34.2	−6.5
Conservative	Chris Groves	1,338	31.2	−1.8
Labour	Verity Jane Sinclair	937	21.8	+10.0
Green	Jeremy Bartlett	549	12.8	+1.3
Majority		129	3.0	
Turnout		4,291	58.6	
Liberal Democrats hold		Swing		

=== Lakenham ===
Lakenham
Party	Candidate	Votes	%	±%
Labour	Keith Malcolm Driver	1,244	41.6	+2.1
Liberal Democrats	Helen Anne Whitworth	637	21.3	−14.9
Green	Penny Edwards	554	18.5	+8.5
Conservative	Mathew John Morris	243	11.8	+1.9
UKIP	Steve Emmens	201	6.7	+2.3
Majority		607	20.3	
Turnout		2,989	41.6	
Labour hold		Swing		

=== Mancroft ===
Mancroft
Party	Candidate	Votes	%	±%
Green	Amy Grace Stammers	1,355	41.5	+1.9
Labour Co-op	Marion Frances Maxwell	1,092	33.4	+6.9
Conservative	Stefan Richard Rose	491	15.0	−0.3
Liberal Democrats	Simon Richard Nobbs	330	10.1	−8.4
Majority		263	8.1	+1.6
Turnout		3,268	41.0	
Green hold		Swing		

=== Miles Cross ===
Mile Cross
Party	Candidate	Votes	%	±%
Labour	Ralph Edward Gayton	1,227	51.0	+7.4
Conservative	Oscar Pinnington	445	18.5	+5.4
Green	Ben Francis Duffy	343	14.2	+1.4
Liberal Democrats	Carl Edward Mayhew	288	12.0	−18.4
UKIP	Richard Crooks	105	4.4	n/a
Majority		782	32.5	
Turnout		2,408	32.0	
Labour hold		Swing		

=== Nelson ===
Nelson
Party	Candidate	Votes	%	±%
Green	Denise Eileen Carlo	2,059	54.8	−6.8
Labour	Marian Chapman	986	26.2	+13.3
Conservative	Hannah Charley Feiner	425	11.3	+2.5
Liberal Democrats	Kate Hannah Atkins	288	7.7	−9.1
Majority		1,073	28.6	
Turnout		3,758	49.5	
Green hold		Swing		

=== Sewell ===
Sewell
Party	Candidate	Votes	%	±%
Labour	Julie Dawn Brociek-Coulton	1,187	41.2	+2.2
Green	Megan Susannah Lewis	720	25.0	+1.0
Conservative	Tony Barton	573	19.9	+0.9
Liberal Democrats	Ian Robert Williams	243	8.4	−9.5
UKIP	Glenn Stuart Tingle	160	5.5	n/a
Majority		467	16.2	
Turnout		2,883	38.2	
Labour hold		Swing		

=== Thorpe Hamlet ===
Thorpe Hamlet
Party	Candidate	Votes	%	±%
Green	Jo Henderson	1,238	39.3	+4.8
Labour Co-op	Michael John Stonard	753	23.9	+8.4
Conservative	William Samuel de Spretter	694	22.0	+6.5
Liberal Democrats	Jeremy Nigel Hooke	464	14.7	−19.8
Majority		585	15.4	
Turnout		3,149	37.9	
Green gain from Liberal Democrats		Swing		

=== Town Close ===
Town Close
Party	Candidate	Votes	%	±%
Green	Stephen Ralph Little	1763	44.2	−0.1
Labour Co-op	Chris Ovel	991	24.8	+9.9
Conservative	Christopher David Benjamin	762	19.1	+0.5
Liberal Democrats	Mark Johnston	464	11.6	−10.5
Majority		772	19.4	
Turnout		3980	46.4	
Green hold		Swing		

=== University ===
University
Party	Candidate	Votes	%	±%
Labour Co-op	Sarah Grenville	1,382	57.3	+7.1
Green	Robbie Laird	475	19.7	+3.7
Conservative	Tom Cannon	328	13.6	+3.7
Liberal Democrats	Andrew Norris Wright	228	9.4	−11.1
Majority		907	37.6	
Turnout		2,413	31.3	
Labour hold		Swing		

=== Wensum ===
Wensum
Party	Candidate	Votes	%	±%
Green	Lucy Frances Galvin	1,375	43.7	−5.4
Labour Co-op	Thomas Vaughan	1,208	38.4	+13.7
Conservative	Stephen Michael Karanicholas	387	12.3	+1.2
Liberal Democrats	Kathy Riviere	175	5.6	−9.4
Majority		167	5.3	
Turnout		3,145	40.3	
Green hold		Swing		
