= Norwich City Council =

City council for Norwich, England

Type
- Type: Non-metropolitan district

Leadership
- Lord Mayor: Karen Davis, Independent since 19 May 2026
- Leader: Lucy Galvin, Green since 19 May 2026
- Chief Executive: Louise Rawsthorne since 1 May 2023

Structure
- Seats: 39 councillors
- Political groups: Green (21) Labour (12) Liberal Democrat (3) Reform UK (2) Independent (1)

Elections
- Voting system: First past the post
- Last election: 7 May 2026
- Next election: N/A

Meeting place
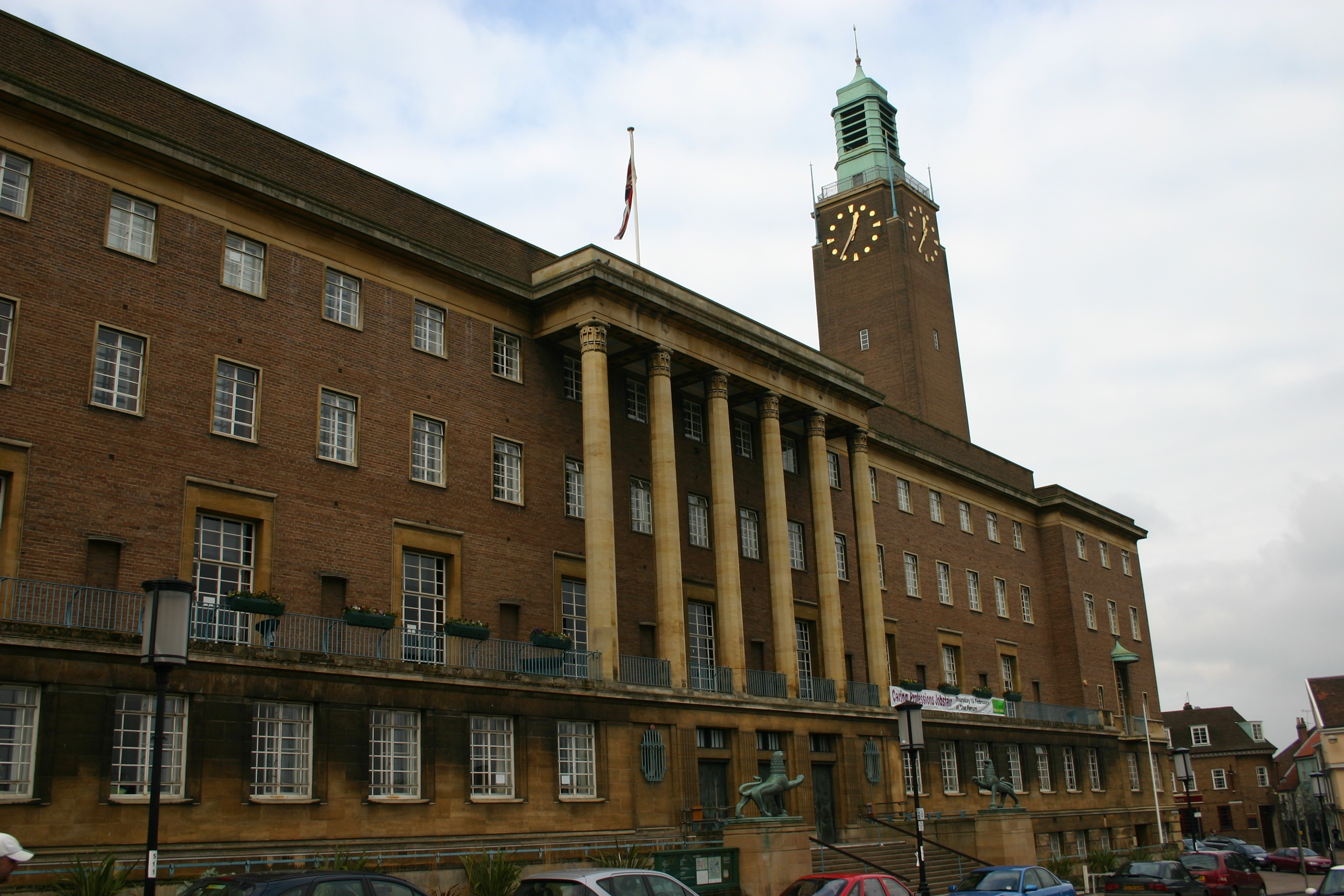
- City Hall, St Peter's Street, Norwich, NR2 1NH

Website
- www.norwich.gov.uk

Norwich City Council is the local authority for Norwich, a non-metropolitan district with city status in Norfolk, England. It consists of 39 councillors, elected to represent 13 wards, each with three councillors. It forms the lower tier of local government in Norwich, responsible for local services such as housing, planning, leisure and tourism.

== History ==
Norwich was an ancient borough and held city status from 1094 when the Bishop of the East Angles moved the seat of the diocese to Norwich. The city was governed by a corporation, also known as the city council. In 1404 the city was made a county corporate with its own sheriffs and quarter sessions, making it administratively separate from the surrounding county of Norfolk.

The city was reformed in 1836 to become a municipal borough under the Municipal Corporations Act 1835. When elected county councils were established in 1889 under the Local Government Act 1888, Norwich was considered large enough for the city council to provide county-level services, and so Norwich was made a county borough, independent from Norfolk County Council. In 1910 the city council was given the right to appoint a lord mayor.

The city was reconstituted as a non-metropolitan district on 1 April 1974 under the Local Government Act 1972, becoming a lower-tier district authority with Norfolk County Council providing county-level functions to the city for the first time. The city kept the same outer boundaries, but did gain an exclave from Norfolk containing the Shirehall. Norwich kept its borough and city statuses and its lord mayoralty.

In 2010 it was proposed to convert Norwich to a unitary authority, making it independent from Norfolk County Council. A structural change order was due to take effect on 1 April 2011. Following the 2010 general election, the coalition government came into office and passed the Local Government Act 2010 cancelling the changes.

In March 2026, the government announced plans to abolish the city council in 2028 as part of local government reorganisation across Norfolk. These proposals were withdrawn in September 2026.

== Governance ==
Norwich City Council provides district-level services, including housing, town planning, leisure and tourism. County-level services, including schools, social services and libraries and transport, are provided by Norfolk County Council. There are no civil parishes in Norwich, which has been an unparished area since the 1974 reforms.

The city's territory includes part of The Broads, where town planning is the responsibility of the Broads Authority. The city council appoints one of its councillors to sit on that authority.

=== Political control ===
The council has been under Green Party majority control since the 2026 election.

Political control of the council since the 1974 reforms took effect has been as follows:

| Party in control | Years |
|---|---|
| Labour | 1974–2002 |
| Liberal Democrats | 2002–2004 |
| No overall control | 2004–2012 |
| Labour | 2012–2023 |
| No overall control | 2023–2026 |
| Green | 2026– |

=== Leadership ===
The role of Lord Mayor of Norwich is largely ceremonial, and is generally held by a different person each year. Political leadership is provided instead by the leader of the council. The leaders since the 1974 reforms have been:

| Councillor | Party | From | To |
|---|---|---|---|
| Arthur South | Labour | 1974 | 1978 |
| Len Stevenson | Labour | 1978 | 1983 |
| Patricia Hollis | Labour | 1983 | 1988 |
| Janet Sillett | Labour | 1988 | 1993 |
| Alan Waters | Labour | 1993 | 1998 |
| Nick Williams | Labour | 1998 | 2002 |
| Ian Couzens | Liberal Democrats | 2002 | May 2006 |
| Steve Morphew | Labour | May 2006 | May 2011 |
| Brenda Arthur | Labour | 17 May 2011 | 26 May 2015 |
| Alan Waters | Labour | 26 May 2015 | May 2023 |
| Mike Stonard | Labour | 23 May 2023 | May 2026 |
| Lucy Galvin | Green | 19 May 2026 | |

=== Composition ===
Following the 2026 election, the composition of the council was:

| Party | Councillors |
|---|---|
| Green | 21 |
| Labour | 12 |
| Liberal Democrats | 3 |
| Reform | 2 |
| Independent | 1 |
| Total | 39 |

== Premises ==
The council is based at City Hall on St Peter's Street, overlooking Norwich Market in the city centre. The building was completed in 1938 and is a Grade II* listed building.

== Elections ==
Since the last boundary changes in 2019 the council has comprised 39 councillors representing 13 wards, with each ward electing three councillors. Elections are held three years out of every four, with a third of the council (one councillor for each ward) elected each time for a four-year term. Norfolk County Council elections are held in the fourth year of the cycle when there are no city council elections.

== Coat of arms ==
The city arms with unofficial angel supporters from a 1903 cigarette card

The city council's arms consist of a red shield featuring a silver-domed castle above a royal lion. The blazon of the arms is:

Gules, a castle triple-towered and domed Argent; in base a lion passant guardant Or.

The arms appeared on a 15th-century seal and were confirmed during a heraldic visitation in 1562 by William Harvey, Clarenceux King of Arms. According to Wilfrid Scott-Giles, the royal lion was said to have been granted by Edward III. By the 19th century the city corporation had added supporters to the arms—two angels—which were surmounted by a fur cap. These apparently originated in a carving of about 1534 outside Norwich Guildhall. A. C. Fox-Davies noted that "whether or not these figures were then intended for heraldic supporters is a matter for dispute. At any rate there is no official authority for their use". Following the abolition of the county borough of Norwich in 1974, an Order in Council transferred the ancient coat of arms (the shield alone) to the newly created city council. The city council has also received the grant of an heraldic badge, depicting the seal of 1404 encircled by the Lord Mayor's chain.

== Norwich City Services ==
Norwich City Services Ltd
- Type: Limited
- Industry: Municipal services
- Founded: 9 June 2020
- Founder: Norwich City Council
- Headquarters: Norwich, United Kingdom
- Area served: Norwich city and surrounding areas
- Services: Waste management, street cleaning, pest control, grounds maintenance
- Owner: Norwich City Council
- Website: Official website

Norwich City Services Limited also known as NCSL or Norwich Services Ltd is a municipal services company wholly owned by the council. Founded on 9 June 2020, the company aims to provide essential services to the residents and businesses of Norwich, England. The company offers a range of services beyond those provided on behalf of the City council, including environmental, cleaning, and grounds maintenance services for private businesses, organizations, and schools. Prices are available upon request. The current services available to book include:

- Pest control
- Tractor Services
- Cleaning Services
