= Bracknell Forest Borough Council elections =

English local elections

Bracknell Forest Borough Council is the local authority for Bracknell Forest, a unitary authority in Berkshire, England. Until 1 April 1998 it was a lower-tier district council.

== Council elections ==
Composition of the council
Year	Conservative	Labour	Liberal Democrats (Note: Includes totals for the predecessors of the Liberal Democrats, the Liberal Party and SDP (both of which participated in the Alliance).)	Green (Note: Includes totals for the predecessors of the Green Party of England and Wales, the Ecology Party and Green Party UK.)	Independents & Others	Council control after election
Local government reorganisation; council established (31 seats)
1973	9	17	1	–	4	Labour
1976	27	3	1	0	0	Conservative
New ward boundaries (40 seats)
1979	27	10	0	0	3	Conservative
1983	40	0	0	0	0	Conservative
1987	40	0	0	0	0	Conservative
1991	32	7	1	0	0	Conservative
1995	12	22	6	0	0	Labour
Bracknell Forest becomes a unitary authority
1997	23	17	0	0	0	Conservative
2000	30	10	0	0	0	Conservative
New ward boundaries (42 seats)
2003	35	6	1	0	0	Conservative
2007	39	3	0	0	0	Conservative
2011	40	2	0	0	0	Conservative
2015	41	1	0	0	0	Conservative
2019	38	3	1	0	0	Conservative
New ward boundaries (41 seats)
2023	10	22	7	2	0	Labour

== Results maps ==
2003 results map

2007 results map

2011 results map

2015 results map

2019 results map

2023 results map

== By-election results ==
=== 1997–2000 ===
Great Hollands South By-Election 12 November 1998
Party	Candidate	Votes	%	±%
Labour	John Piasecki	638	62.2	+18.9
Conservative	Diana Henfrey	329	32.1	−8.3
Liberal Democrats	David Maxwell	58	5.7	−10.6
Majority		309	30.1	
Turnout		1,025	29.0	
Labour gain from Conservative		Swing		

Harmans Water By-Election 25 February 1999
Party	Candidate	Votes	%	±%
Labour	Roy Bailey	876	50.2	+10.7
Conservative	Christopher Turrell	765	43.9	+8.9
Liberal Democrats	Alan Cocks	103	5.9	−10.6
Majority		111	6.3	
Turnout		1,744	28.0	
Labour hold		Swing		

=== 2000–2003 ===
Priestwood By-Election 8 November 2001
Party	Candidate	Votes	%	±%
Labour	David Fawcett	382	49.0	−10.8
Conservative	Tony Packham	312	40.1	−0.1
Liberal Democrats	Sarah Edwards	85	10.9	+10.9
Majority		70	8.9	
Turnout		779	29.0	
Labour hold		Swing		

Hanworth By-Election 14 November 2002
Party	Candidate	Votes	%	±%
Conservative	Charles Bailey	576	40.4	−2.9
Labour	Janet Keene	521	36.6	−0.9
Liberal Democrats	Lorraine De Laune	137	9.6	−1.6
Green	David Young	120	8.4	+0.4
UKIP	Lawrence Boxall	71	5.0	+5.0
Majority		55	3.8	
Turnout		1,425	22.0	
Conservative hold		Swing		

=== 2003–2007 ===
Binfield with Warfield By-Election 23 March 2006
Party	Candidate	Votes	%	±%
Conservative	Brenda Wilson	921	55.5	+16.4
Liberal Democrats	Michael Hawkins	444	26.8	+4.0
Labour	David Fawcett	174	10.5	−8.7
UKIP	Jeffrey Newbold	119	7.2	+7.2
Majority		477	28.7	
Turnout		1,658	28.4	
Conservative hold		Swing		

=== 2007–2011 ===
Hanworth By-Election 15 October 2009
Party	Candidate	Votes	%	±%
Conservative	Mark Phillips	640	42.4	−14.2
Labour	Janet Keene	377	25.0	−1.9
Liberal Democrats	Larraine De Laune	206	13.7	+13.7
UKIP	Jeff Newbold	139	9.2	+9.2
Green	Steven Gabb	77	5.1	−11.3
BNP	David Penson	70	4.6	+4.6
Majority		263	17.4	
Turnout		1,509	23.4	
Conservative hold		Swing		

Owlsmoor By-Election 25 February 2010
Party	Candidate	Votes	%	±%
Conservative	Norman Bowers	508	54.2	−1.9
Liberal Democrats	Mark Thompson	238	25.4	+25.4
Labour	Guy Gillbe	126	13.4	+13.4
Green	Peter Forbes	66	7.0	+7.0
Majority		270	28.8	
Turnout		938	24.0	
Conservative hold		Swing		

=== 2011-2015 ===
Winkfield & Cranbourne By-Election 28 November 2013
Party	Candidate	Votes	%	±%
Conservative	Susie Phillips	582	52.5	−18.9
UKIP	Ken La Garde	318	28.7	+28.7
Labour	Janet Hazel Keene	139	12.5	−1.4
Liberal Democrats	Paul Peter Birchall	69	6.2	+6.2
Majority		264	23.8	
Turnout		1108	27	−20
Conservative hold		Swing		

=== 2015-2019 ===
Central Sandhurst By-Election 20 October 2016
Party	Candidate	Votes	%	±%
Conservative	Gaby Kennedy	476	69.3	+6.3
Labour	Anne Brunton	211	30.7	+10.5
Majority		265	38.6	
Turnout		687	17	−52
Conservative hold		Swing		

=== 2019-2023 ===
Old Bracknell By-Election 9 December 2021
Party	Candidate	Votes	%	±%
Labour	Paul Bidwell	434	61.1	+23.2
Conservative	Iain McCracken	276	38.9	−9.3
Majority		158	22.2	
Turnout		710	17	−12
Labour gain from Conservative		Swing	16.3	

=== 2023-2027 ===
Caused by the resignation of Labour councillor Naheed Ejaz

Great Hollands By-Election 7 November 2024
Party	Candidate	Votes	%	±%
Labour	Donna Louise Pressland	681	44.6	−29.3
Conservative	Sue Housego	411	26.9	+0.8
Reform	Colin Wright	258	16.9	New
Independent	Michael Gbadebo	158	10.3	New
Heritage	Jason Peter Reardon	20	1.3	New
Turnout		1528	22.3	
Registered electors				
Labour hold		Swing	-15.1	
