= 2023 Bracknell Forest Borough Council election =

2023 election in England

- 4 May 2023

All 41 seats to Bracknell Forest Borough Council 21 seats needed for a majority
- Turnout: 28% (▼2pp)
	First party	Second party
Leader	Mary Temperton	Paul Bettison
Party	Labour	Conservative
Leader since	2011	1996
Leader's seat	Great Hollands	Ran in Sandhurst (lost)
Last election	3 seats, 26.7%	38 seats, 48.5%
Seats before	4	37
Seats won	22	10
Seat change	▲19	▼28
Popular vote	8,173	11,388
Percentage	30.4%	42.4%
Swing	▲3.7%	▼6.1%
	Third party	Fourth party
Leader	Thomas Parker (not standing)	N/A
Party	Liberal Democrats	Green
Leader since	2019	N/A
Leader's seat	Wildridings & Central	N/A
Last election	1 seats, 20.4%	0 seats, 1.9%
Seats before	1	0
Seats won	7	2
Seat change	▲6	▲2
Popular vote	4,563	2,258
Percentage	17.0%	8.4%
Swing	▼3.4%	▲6.5%
- Winner of each seat at the 2023 Bracknell Forest Borough Council election
Leader before election
Paul Bettison
Conservative
Leader after election
Mary Temperton
Labour

The 2023 Bracknell Forest Borough Council election took place on 4 May 2023, to elect all 41 members in 15 wards for Bracknell Forest Borough Council in England. The election took place on the same day as other local elections in England as part of the 2023 United Kingdom local elections. Due to a boundary review there had been a change in ward boundaries, along with a reduction in size from 42 members elected in 2019. This is the first election since 1971 (under the council's predecessor Easthampstead Rural District) where a majority of seats are outside Bracknell. The election was held alongside concurrent town and parish council elections in Binfield, Bracknell, Crowthorne, Sandhurst, Warfield, and Winkfield.

The Labour Party won an overall majority of 3, ending the 26-year Conservative Party administration, with both the Leader of the Council Paul Bettison and Deputy Leader Dale Birch losing re-election in the new ward of Sandhurst. By seat share, it is the worst result for the Conservatives in the history of Bracknell District and Bracknell Forest, eclipsing their defeat in 1973. Additionally, by measure of seats lost, it was the worst Conservative result in the country that electoral cycle. Conversely, it is the best performance for the Liberal Democrats and its antecedents, winning 7 seats. The Green Party gained victory for the first time in the council's history, winning 2 seats.

== Background ==
The council had been controlled by the Conservative Party since the unitary authority was created in 1998. The predecessor district council was controlled by the Conservatives, save for an initial period from 1973 to 1976 and later 1995 to 1997 when it was controlled by the Labour Party.

Paul Bettison was the Leader of the Council since 1997, having been elected leader of the Conservative group in 1996. Mary Temperton has been leader of the Labour group since 2011. Thomas Parker, the lone Liberal Democrat, announced he would not stand for re-election, having been first elected in 2019.

=== Pre-Election Composition ===
Graph of the party split among 42 seats.
Party	Seats
Conservatives	37
Labour	4
Liberal Democrats	1

== Campaign ==
The Conservatives nominated a full slate of 41 candidates, whilst Labour only put forward 24, the Liberal Democrats 12, and the Greens 7. However, in none of these contests were Labour and the Liberal Democrats standing against each other, and likewise between the Liberal Democrats and the Greens - in only 2 of the 15 wards were Labour and the Greens opposing each other. This was a significant reversal from 2019, when Labour put up a full slate, and led to accusations that an arrangement had been reached between the three parties as a form of progressive alliance - a fact denied by the local Labour and Liberal Democrats. Reform UK and the Heritage Party also stood 1 candidate each in Harmans Water & Crown Wood - their first entry at a Bracknell Forest election. Finally, two independents stood - one in Town Centre & The Parks and another in Whitegrove.

Soon after nominations closed, controversy emerged over the selection of one of the Conservative candidates for Bracknell Town Council on Priestwood ward, Andrew McBride. McBride was a former regional organiser of the far-right British National Party, having also stood as a BNP candidate for Priestwood & Garth at the 2007 election, as well as a former deputy leader of the far-right Britain First. The Bracknell Conservative Association subsequently suspended his membership and disavowed his candidacy - however, it was legally too late to withdraw McBride from the election, so he appeared on the ballot as a Conservative candidate. The association indicated it would deny him the Conservative whip should he be elected. Outgoing Conservative cabinet member, Marc Brunel-Walker, announced on 12 April that he had submitted a motion of no-confidence in the association's officers over its selection of McBride in the first place.

11 incumbent councillors (10 of them Conservative) announced they would be standing down.

== Results ==
2023 Bracknell Forest Borough Council election
Party	Seats	Gains	Losses	Net gain/loss	Seats %	Votes %	Votes	+/−
Labour	22	▲19	0	▲19	53.7	30.4	8,173	+383
Conservative	10	0	▼28	▼28	24.4	42.4	11,388	-2,795
Liberal Democrats	7	▲6	0	▲6	17.1	17.0	4,563	-1,393
Green	2	▲2	0	▲2	4.9	8.4	2,258	+1,708
Independent	0	0	0	0	0.0	0.8	221	+221
Heritage	0	0	0	0	0.0	0.6	155	+155
Reform	0	0	0	0	0.0	0.5	122	+122

== Ward results ==
=== Binfield North & Warfield West ===
Binfield North & Warfield West (3)
Party	Candidate	Votes	%	±%
Green	Sheila Collings	1,004	58.0	
Green	Adrian Michael Haffegee	901	52.1	
Conservative	John Bruce Harrison	807	46.6	
Conservative	Ian William Leake	790	45.7	
Conservative	Ankur Shiv Bhandari	643	37.2	
Turnout		1,730	28	
Registered electors		6,254		
Rejected ballots		20	1.1	
Green win (new seat)				
Green win (new seat)				
Conservative win (new seat)				

=== Binfield South & Jennett’s Park ===
Binfield South & Jennett’s Park (3)
Party	Candidate	Votes	%	±%
Labour	Kathryn Claire Neil	1,111	55.4	
Labour	Georgia Rose Pickering	1,025	51.1	
Labour	Steve O'Regan	1,007	50.2	
Conservative	Paul Vincent Byron	910	45.3	
Conservative	Kiran Kumar Meka	804	40.1	
Conservative	Rishi Bhandari	768	38.3	
Turnout		2,007	27	
Registered electors		7,597		
Rejected ballots		20	1.0	
Labour win (new seat)				
Labour win (new seat)				
Labour win (new seat)				

=== Bullbrook ===
Bullbrook (2)
Party	Candidate	Votes	%	±%
Labour	Caroline May Egglestone	574	55.1	
Labour	Kandy Jefferies	510	48.9	
Conservative	Henry Michael Norman Campbell-Ricketts	474	45.5	
Conservative	Sanjeev Prasad	461	44.2	
Turnout		1,042	25	
Registered electors		4,221		
Rejected ballots		17	1.6	
Labour win (new seat)				
Labour win (new seat)				

=== Crowthorne ===
Crowthorne (3)
Party	Candidate	Votes	%	±%
Conservative	Tina McKenzie-Boyle	907	52.2	
Liberal Democrats	Tina Eberle	829	47.8	
Conservative	Nicholas Ian Robertson	828	47.7	
Conservative	Bob Wade	799	46.0	
Liberal Democrats	Richard Montague Beaumont	792	45.6	
Liberal Democrats	Terry Enga	728	41.9	
Turnout		1,736	30	
Registered electors		5,755		
Rejected ballots		8	0.5	
Conservative win (new seat)				
Liberal Democrats win (new seat)				
Conservative win (new seat)				

=== Easthampstead & Wildridings ===
Easthampstead & Wildridings (3)
Party	Candidate	Votes	%	±%
Labour	Paul Steven Bidwell	908	57.5	
Labour	Guy Alexander Gillbe	906	57.3	
Labour	Helen Amelia Purnell	844	53.4	
Conservative	Dee Hamilton	535	33.9	
Conservative	Iain Alexander McCracken	512	32.4	
Conservative	Sabyasachi Chattaraj	481	30.4	
Green	Victor John Rones	261	16.5	
Turnout		1,580	25	
Registered electors		6,432		
Rejected ballots		7	0.4	
Labour win (new seat)				
Labour win (new seat)				
Labour win (new seat)				

=== Great Hollands ===
Great Hollands (3)
Party	Candidate	Votes	%	±%
Labour	Mary Louise Temperton	1,666	76.5	
Labour	Gerry Webb	1,323	60.7	
Labour	Naheed Ejaz	1,301	59.7	
Conservative	Michael Adeniyi Abayomi Gbadebo	588	27.0	
Conservative	Kevin Roy Buchler	545	25.0	
Conservative	Kenneth Paul Widdowson	470	21.6	
Turnout		2,178	33	
Registered electors		6,641		
Rejected ballots		12	0.5	
Labour win (new seat)				
Labour win (new seat)				
Labour win (new seat)				

=== Hanworth ===
Hanworth (3)
Party	Candidate	Votes	%	±%
Labour	Jenny Penfold	1,037	55.6	
Labour	Janet Gwendoline Cochrane	967	51.9	
Labour	Cath Thompson	936	50.2	
Conservative	Gill Birch	821	44.0	
Conservative	Mike Gibson	803	43.1	
Conservative	Michael John Skinner	736	39.5	
Turnout		1,864	30	
Registered electors		6,320		
Rejected ballots		27	1.4	
Labour win (new seat)				
Labour win (new seat)				
Labour win (new seat)				

=== Harmans Water & Crown Wood ===
Harmans Water & Crown Wood (3)
Party	Candidate	Votes	%	±%
Labour	Cherise April Welch	887	51.7	
Labour	Pete Frewer	885	51.5	
Labour	Jodie Christas Watts	882	51.4	
Conservative	Chris Franklin	671	39.1	
Conservative	Lizzy Gibson	637	37.1	
Conservative	Christopher Richard Martin Turrell	634	36.9	
Heritage	Jason Peter Reardon	155	9.0	
Reform	John Gallacher	122	7.1	
Turnout		1,717	27	
Registered electors		6,298		
Rejected ballots		14	0.8	
Labour win (new seat)				
Labour win (new seat)				
Labour win (new seat)				

=== Owlsmoor & College Town ===
Owlsmoor & College Town (3)
Party	Candidate	Votes	%	±%
Conservative	Nick Allen	1,093	54.8	
Conservative	Raymond Mossom	1,023	51.3	
Liberal Democrats	Philip Geoffrey Thompson	937	47.0	
Conservative	John Edwards	899	45.1	
Liberal Democrats	Ben Ian Jeffrey Hutchinson	811	40.7	
Liberal Democrats	Leigh Sharon Quigg	803	40.3	
Turnout		1,994	27	
Registered electors		7,451		
Rejected ballots		21	1.0	
Conservative win (new seat)				
Conservative win (new seat)				
Liberal Democrats win (new seat)				

=== Priestwood & Garth ===
Priestwood & Garth (3)
Party	Candidate	Votes	%	±%
Labour	Tricia Brown	980	60.7	
Labour	Ryan George Frost	914	56.6	
Labour	Michael Karim	829	51.4	
Conservative	Jennie Karen Green	656	40.6	
Conservative	Alvin Edwin Finch	621	38.5	
Conservative	Hazel Hill	574	35.6	
Turnout		1,614	24	
Registered electors		6,687		
Rejected ballots		19	1.2	
Labour win (new seat)				
Labour win (new seat)				
Labour win (new seat)				

=== Sandhurst ===
Sandhurst (3)
Party	Candidate	Votes	%	±%
Liberal Democrats	Mike Forster	1,325	56.2	
Liberal Democrats	Christoph Eberle	1,109	47.1	
Liberal Democrats	Mohammad Nazar Zahuruddin	1,030	43.7	
Conservative	Parm Panesar	1,024	43.5	
Conservative	Dale Philip Birch	1,008	42.8	
Conservative	Paul David Bettison	969	41.1	
Turnout		2,356	33	
Registered electors		7,291		
Rejected ballots		28	1.2	
Liberal Democrats win (new seat)				
Liberal Democrats win (new seat)				
Liberal Democrats win (new seat)				

=== Swinley Forest ===
Swinley Forest (2)
Party	Candidate	Votes	%	±%
Liberal Democrats	Sophie Louise Forster	748	57.0	
Liberal Democrats	Patrick Smith	698	53.2	
Conservative	Colin Reginald Dudley	544	41.4	
Conservative	Ash Merry	540	41.1	
Turnout		1,313	28	
Registered electors		4,780		
Rejected ballots		17	1.3	
Liberal Democrats win (new seat)				
Liberal Democrats win (new seat)				

=== Town Centre & The Parks ===
Town Centre & The Parks (2)
Party	Candidate	Votes	%	±%
Labour	Megan Ruth Wright	551	53.8	
Labour	Roy John Bailey	538	52.5	
Conservative	Suki Alanna Hayes	397	38.7	
Conservative	Peter Heydon	377	36.8	
Independent	Olivio Baretto	93	9.1	
Turnout		1,025	25	
Registered electors		4,207		
Rejected ballots		12	1.2	
Labour win (new seat)				
Labour win (new seat)				

=== Whitegrove ===
Whitegrove (2)
Party	Candidate	Votes	%	±%
Conservative	Gareth Michael Barnard	913	55.6	
Conservative	Robert Lauchlan McLean	789	48.1	
Labour	Grant David Strudley	459	28.0	
Labour	Graham William Firth	389	23.7	
Green	Rosaleen Melinda Donnan	274	16.7	
Green	Philip Vincent Marshall Pitt	211	12.9	
Independent	Colleen Dulieu	128	7.8	
Turnout		1,642	32	
Registered electors		5,152		
Rejected ballots		6	0.4	
Conservative win (new seat)				
Conservative win (new seat)				

=== Winkfield & Warfield East ===
Winkfield & Warfield East (3)
Party	Candidate	Votes	%	±%
Conservative	Moira Kathleen Gaw	1,048	55.0	
Conservative	Dorothy Andrea Susan Hayes	1,026	53.8	
Conservative	Tony Virgo	894	46.9	
Liberal Democrats	Simon Christopher Banks	724	38.0	
Green	Samantha Mary Gibbins	719	37.7	
Green	Mark Julien Harvey	621	32.6	
Turnout		1,907	27	
Registered electors		7,114		
Rejected ballots		10	0.5	
Conservative win (new seat)				
Conservative win (new seat)				
Conservative win (new seat)				

== Aftermath ==
The Labour takeover was considered one of the shocks of the 2023 United Kingdom local elections, with many pundits ascribing the defeat in part to the theorised deal between Labour and the Liberal Democrats - outgoing leader Paul Bettison himself identified this and the woes of the Conservative government nationally as the reasons for his party's defeat. Mary Temperton, the Labour Party group leader, continued to deny such a pact existed, but nevertheless the result fuelled calls for a progressive alliance. Over a year later at the 2024 general election, both of Bracknell Forest's parliamentary constituencies would flip from the Conservatives - Bracknell to Labour and Maidenhead to the Liberal Democrats.

== Councillors standing down ==
Councillor	Ward	First elected	Party	Date announced
Thomas Parker	Wildridings & Central	2019	Liberal Democrats	3 October 2022
Marc Brunel-Walker	Crown Wood	2003	Conservative Party	21 December 2022
Robert Angell	Bullbrook	1983	Conservative Party	4 May 2023
Nigel Atkinson	Ascot	2019	Conservative Party	4 May 2023
Michael Brossard	Central Sandhurst	2007	Conservative Party	4 May 2023
Sandra Ingham	Warfield Harvest Ride	2015	Conservative Party	4 May 2023
Gaby Kennedy	Central Sandhurst	2016	Conservative Party	4 May 2023
Ian Kirke	Bullbrook	2019	Conservative Party	4 May 2023
Isabel Mattick	Harmans Water	1987	Conservative Party	4 May 2023
Pauline McKenzie	College Town	2015	Conservative Party	4 May 2023
John Porter	Owlsmoor	2011	Conservative Party	4 May 2023

== Changes 2023–2027 ==
- October 2025: Caroline Egglestone (Bullbrook) and Cherise Welch (Harmans Water & Crown Wood) left the Labour Party to sit as independents, putting the council into no overall control with Labour continuing as a minority administration.
- March 2026: Council leader Mary Temperton (Great Hollands) stepped down and Cabinet member Roy Bailey (Town Centre & The Parks) resigned his cabinet post after both were suspended by the Labour Party pending a disciplinary investigation connected to a fundraiser for former mayor Naheed Ejaz; deputy leader Helen Purnell served as acting leader in the interim.
- July 2026: Temperton and Bailey were both cleared and readmitted to the Labour Party.

=== By-elections ===
==== Great Hollands ====
The by-election followed the resignation of Labour councillor Naheed Ejaz in September 2024, after her arrest in connection with a case for which she and her son were later convicted.

Great Hollands By-Election 7 November 2024
Party	Candidate	Votes	%	±%
Labour	Donna Louise Pressland	681	44.6	−29.3
Conservative	Sue Housego	411	26.9	+0.8
Reform	Colin Wright	258	16.9	New
Independent	Michael Gbadebo	158	10.3	New
Heritage	Jason Peter Reardon	20	1.3	New
Turnout		1528	22.3	
Registered electors		6,865		
Rejected ballots		4	0.3	
Labour hold		Swing	-15.1	
