= 1997 Bracknell Forest Borough Council election =

1997 local election in Bracknell Forest

← 1995	1 May 1997	2000 →

All 40 seats to Bracknell Forest Borough Council 21 seats needed for a majority
- Turnout: 75%
	First party	Second party	Third party
	Con	Lab	LD
Leader	Paul Bettison	Austin McCormack	David Neighbour
Party	Conservative	Labour	Liberal Democrats
Leader's seat	Little Sandhurst	Wildridings	College Town (lost re-election)
Last election	12	22	6
Seats won	23	17	0
Seat change	▲11	▼5	▼6
Popular vote	25,438	17,751	11,857
Percentage	44.7%	31.2%	20.8%
Swing	▲7.1%	▼7.6%	▼1.6%
Council control before election
Labour
Council control after election
Conservative

The 1997 Bracknell Forest Borough Council election took place on 1 May 1997, to elect all 40 members in 19 wards for Bracknell Forest Borough Council in England. The election was held on the same day as both the 1997 United Kingdom general election and other local elections in England as part of the 1997 United Kingdom local elections, resulting in a much higher turnout of 75% compared to 1995. With the planned abolition of Berkshire County Council, Bracknell Forest would see itself transition from a district council to a unitary authority a year into the new term. Despite the landslide victory of the Labour Party in the general election, Bracknell Forest emerged as the only council in the United Kingdom to switch from outright Labour control to outright Conservative control, with the Conservative Party gaining a majority of 6. The Liberal Democrats were wiped out.

Part of the reason for such a dramatic switch was ascribed to the presence of a 'New Labour' slate of candidates. Irrespective of its name, it was not connected to the New Labour movement, but was led by former Labour group leader John Tompkins. In two wards, where the Conservatives gained 3 councillors from Labour, the margin of victory was smaller than the vote share of the 'New Labour' candidates. The local Labour Party argued that the similarity of the 'New Labour' name amounted to an attempt at confusing voters and investigated legal action. Former Conservative council leader Alan Ward, who won re-election in Central Sandhurst, surmised that the national Labour Party - both euphoric and preoccupied by its win of government - was not interested in pursuing the case, and the election results were allowed to stand. This would be the start of a 26-year Conservative reign, headed by Paul Bettison, that would only end in 2023.

== Results summary ==
1997 Bracknell Forest Borough Council election
Party	Seats	Gains	Losses	Net gain/loss	Seats %	Votes %	Votes	+/−
Conservative	23	▲11	0	▲11	57.5	44.7	25,438	
Labour	17	0	▼5	▼5	42.5	31.2	17,751	
Liberal Democrats	0	0	▼6	▼6	0.0	20.8	11,857	
New Labour	0	0	0	0	0.0	2.2	1,251	
Independent	0	0	0	0	0.0	1.1	642	

== Ward results ==
An asterisk (*) denotes an incumbent councillor standing for re-election

=== Ascot ===
Ascot (3)
Party	Candidate	Votes	%	±%
Conservative	Anne Kay Haydon	2,955	51.3	+17.4
Conservative	Hilary Doyle*	2,928		
Conservative	Dorothy Andrea Susan Hayes*	2,893		
Liberal Democrats	Frances Sophia Farrelly	1,433	24.9	−8.1
Labour	Lucy Mary Norman	1,376	23.9	−9.2
Liberal Democrats	Susan Jane Simmonds	1,358		
Liberal Democrats	Anthony Francis Harradine	1,343		
Labour	John James Harding	1,295		
Labour	John Kenneth Wright	1,206		
Turnout			69.7	+38.7
Registered electors		8,267		
Conservative hold		Swing		
Conservative gain from Labour		Swing		
Conservative gain from Liberal Democrats		Swing		

=== Binfield ===
Binfield (2)
Party	Candidate	Votes	%	±%
Conservative	Terry Mills	2,059	50.7	+2.9
Conservative	John Bruce Harrison	1,996		
Labour	Robert Martin Woodrow	915	22.5	−9.8
Labour	Edwin Lloyd Glasson	877		
Liberal Democrats	Bernard Walter Yoxall	721	17.8	−2.1
Independent	Kenneth Charles Bennett	363	8.9	New
Independent	Geoffrey Howard Taylor* (Note: Taylor was elected as a Conservative Party candidate in 1995.)	281		
Turnout			76.3	+40.4
Registered electors		5,384		
Conservative hold		Swing		
Conservative hold		Swing		

=== Bullbrook ===
Bullbrook (3)
Party	Candidate	Votes	%	±%
Labour	Patrick Joseph Ryan*	1,267	36.1	−8.4
Conservative	Gareth Michael Barnard	1,233	35.1	+3.4
Conservative	James Michael Barry Egan*	1,225		
Labour	Robert Edward Draper*	1,214		
Labour	Michael John Salter	1,144		
Conservative	Jones A. Ms.	1,135		
Liberal Democrats	Lesley Marion Boyd	807	23.0	−0.8
Liberal Democrats	Stephen Hedley Barker	770		
Liberal Democrats	Ronald Henry Hanson	690		
New Labour	Carole Ann Hall	204	5.8	New
New Labour	Neil Albert Tomkins	170		
New Labour	Peter John Hall	166		
Turnout			72.6	+30.9
Registered electors		5,105		
Labour hold		Swing		
Conservative gain from Labour		Swing		
Conservative hold		Swing		

=== Central Sandhurst ===
Central Sandhurst (2)
Party	Candidate	Votes	%	±%
Conservative	Peter Laurie North*	1,368	56.5	+12.4
Conservative	Alan Frederick Ward*	1,245		
Liberal Democrats	Raymond William Earwicker	608	25.1	−16.5
Liberal Democrats	John Mark Nicholson	596		
Labour	Jillian Irene Ryan	348	14.4	+0.1
Labour	Edward Geary	286		
New Labour	Peter John Woodburn Darke	97	4.0	New
Turnout			76.8	+29.9
Registered electors		3,159		
Conservative hold		Swing		
Conservative hold		Swing		

=== College Town ===
College Town (2)
Party	Candidate	Votes	%	±%
Conservative	Andrew (Andy) Duncan Blatchford	1,219	46.7	+15.9
Conservative	Raymond Simonds	1,142		
Liberal Democrats	Veronica Anne Sullivan*	993	38.1	−14.6
Liberal Democrats	David Alan Neighbour*	982		
Labour	Ian Plested	397	15.2	−1.3
Labour	Alexandra Denise Tidd	381		
Turnout			69.7	+36.0
Registered electors		4,138		
Conservative gain from Liberal Democrats		Swing		
Conservative gain from Liberal Democrats		Swing		

=== Cranbourne ===
Cranbourne
Party	Candidate	Votes	%	±%
Conservative	Mary Patricia Ballin*	503	67.2	+8.7
Labour	Anthony Malcolm House	246	32.8	−8.7
Turnout			70.0	+35.3
Registered electors		1,089		
Conservative hold		Swing		

=== Crowthorne ===
Crowthorne (3)
Party	Candidate	Votes	%	±%
Conservative	James George Finnie*	1,461	46.8	+8.1
Conservative	Robert Hugh Wade	1,228		
Conservative	John (Cliff) Clifton Thompson	1,172		
Liberal Democrats	Stephen Pope*	949	30.4	−12.8
Liberal Democrats	Christopher Robin Sexton	908		
Liberal Democrats	David James Maxwell*	890		
Labour	Roy John Bailey	712	22.8	+4.7
Labour	Daphne Elizabeth Sandiford	647		
Labour	Sylvia Maria Ruth Trevis	588		
Turnout			75.6	+34.0
Registered electors		4,175		
Conservative gain from Liberal Democrats		Swing		
Conservative gain from Liberal Democrats		Swing		
Conservative hold		Swing		

=== Garth ===
Garth (2)
Party	Candidate	Votes	%	±%
Labour	Dennis Rueben Good*	1,027	47.1	−8.8
Labour	Steven Paul Taylor*	999		
Conservative	Jacqueline Doris Sylvia Ryder	786	36.1	+1.9
Conservative	Beatrice Helen Brown	683		
Liberal Democrats	Robert David Maxwell	269	12.3	+2.4
New Labour	Janette Mary Tompkins	97	4.5	New
New Labour	Jean Oxenbury	64		
Turnout			76.4	+25.7
Registered electors		2,929		
Labour hold		Swing		
Labour hold		Swing		

=== Great Hollands North ===
Great Hollands North (2)
Party	Candidate	Votes	%	±%
Labour	Jeananne Margaret Shillcock*	1,168	45.3	−17.2
Labour	Langdon Richard Jones*	1,160		
Conservative	Betty Anne Nicholls	961	37.2	−0.3
Conservative	Marilyn Denise Edmeades	910		
Liberal Democrats	Polly Martin	452	17.5	New
Turnout			73.8	+30.4
Registered electors		3,628		
Labour hold		Swing		
Labour hold		Swing		

=== Great Hollands South ===
Great Hollands South (2)
Party	Candidate	Votes	%	±%
Labour	Michael John Adams*	1,063	43.3	−3.1
Conservative	Robert Angell	991	40.4	+0.6
Labour	Stephen William King*	975		
Conservative	Janice Ann Angell	948		
Liberal Democrats	John Alexander Shepherd	399	16.3	+2.5
Turnout			69.9	+28.4
Registered electors		3,599		
Labour hold		Swing		
Conservative gain from Labour		Swing		

=== Hanworth ===
Hanworth (3)
Party	Candidate	Votes	%	±%
Labour	George William Bayle	1,953	44.9	−6.4
Labour	Janet Hazel Keene*	1,869		
Labour	Tom Wheaton*	1,853		
Conservative	Martin William Wallace	1,585	36.4	+3.8
Conservative	Alan Sydney Browne	1,581		
Conservative	Diana Simone Olivia Henfrey	1,524		
Liberal Democrats	Geoffrey Noel Le-Patourel	816	18.7	+2.7
Turnout			74.2	+32.2
Registered electors		6,168		
Labour hold		Swing		
Labour hold		Swing		
Labour hold		Swing		

=== Harmans Water ===
Harmans Water (3)
Party	Candidate	Votes	%	±%
Labour	William James Ernest Onions*	2,033	39.5	−11.8
Conservative	Shelagh Rosemary Pile	1,801	35.0	−0.3
Conservative	Jean Amy Sutcliffe	1,721		
Labour	Stanley Charles Simmonds*	1,667		
Conservative	Alexander John Wood	1,607		
Labour	Graham Edward Stuart Vertigen	1,584		
Liberal Democrats	Alan Edward Cocks	847	16.5	+3.1
New Labour	Deborah Rose Simmonds	461	9.0	New
New Labour	Kevin Anthony Philip Simmonds	367		
Turnout			72.9	+32.6
Registered electors		6,351		
Labour hold		Swing		
Conservative gain from Labour		Swing		
Conservative gain from Labour		Swing		

=== Little Sandhurst ===
Little Sandhurst (2)
Party	Candidate	Votes	%	±%
Conservative	Paul David Bettison*	1,291	55.0	+7.0
Conservative	Dale Philip Birch*	1,220		
Liberal Democrats	John Richard Score	618	26.3	−0.4
Liberal Democrats	Nicholas Beresford Taylor	574		
Labour	Clive Urquhart	439	18.7	−6.6
Labour	Susan Dorothy Gurran	415		
Turnout			77.8	+35.4
Registered electors		3,186		
Conservative hold		Swing		
Conservative hold		Swing		

=== Old Bracknell ===
Old Bracknell (3)
Party	Candidate	Votes	%	±%
Labour	Michael John Beadsley	1,368	43.9	−16.4
Labour	Hirst B. Ms.*	1,309		
Labour	Donald Anthony Veakins*	1,196		
Conservative	Elizabeth Regina Mary Ashcroft	1,055	33.8	+6.9
Conservative	Isabel Margaret Mattick	1,034		
Conservative	Christopher Richard Martin Turrell	950		
Liberal Democrats	John Edward Roffey	520	16.7	+3.9
New Labour	John Lewis	174	5.6	New
New Labour	Roderick Alan Lewis	170		
New Labour	Nicola Metcalfe	169		
Turnout			75.1	+29.6
Registered electors		4,055		
Labour hold		Swing		
Labour hold		Swing		
Labour hold		Swing		

=== Owlsmoor ===
Owlsmoor
Party	Candidate	Votes	%	±%
Conservative	David James Worrall	1,480	49.7	+12.2
Liberal Democrats	Reginald Peter John Hodge*	948	31.8	−14.5
Labour	Andrew Douglas Annette	551	18.5	+2.3
Turnout			73.6	+36.3
Registered electors		4,152		
Conservative gain from Liberal Democrats		Swing		

=== Priestwood ===
Priestwood (2)
Party	Candidate	Votes	%	±%
Labour	Juliet Mary Clifford*	930	43.9	+2.5
Labour	David John Fawcett*	798		
Conservative	Veronica Carol Lewin	544	25.7	−0.2
Conservative	Arthur George Thomson	469		
Independent	Raymond Frederick Ackary	279	13.2	New
Liberal Democrats	Stanley James Southgate	228	10.8	+3.5
New Labour	John William Tomkins	136	6.4	New
New Labour	John Joseph Oxenbury	98		
Turnout			76.4	+27.9
Registered electors		2,929		
Labour hold		Swing		
Labour hold		Swing		

=== St. Marys ===
St. Marys
Party	Candidate	Votes	%	±%
Conservative	Robert Anthony Flood*	962	70.5	+3.3
Liberal Democrats	Muriel Evelyn Holburn	252	18.5	New
Labour	Carol Ann Draper	151	11.1	−21.7
Turnout			79.4	+46.3
Registered electors		1,733		
Conservative hold		Swing		

=== Warfield ===
Warfield
Party	Candidate	Votes	%	±%
Conservative	Edward Michael Sargeant*	2,572	59.8	+4.1
Labour	Patricia Eira Brown	986	22.9	+2.6
Liberal Democrats	Martyn Jon Towle	744	17.3	−6.6
Turnout			77.4	+45.2
Registered electors		5,657		
Conservative hold		Swing		

=== Wildridings ===
Wildridings (2)
Party	Candidate	Votes	%	±%
Labour	Austin John McCormack*	821	46.4	−8.6
Labour	Philip Grayson*	754		
Conservative	Margaret Rose Wreglesworth	612	34.6	+1.1
Conservative	Noel William Wreglesworth	553		
Liberal Democrats	Laurence Gerard John Gallagher	253	14.3	+2.8
New Labour	Jonathan Paul Tompkins	82	4.6	New
New Labour	Simon Peter Brooks	52		
Turnout			77.9	+25.9
Registered electors		2,203		
Labour hold		Swing		
Labour hold		Swing		

== By-elections ==
=== Harmans Water ===
Harmans Water By-Election 25 February 1999
Party	Candidate	Votes	%	±%
Labour	Roy John Bailey	876	50.2	+10.7
Conservative	Christopher Richard Martin Turrell	765	43.9	+8.9
Liberal Democrats	Alan Edward Cocks	103	5.9	−10.6
Majority		111	6.3	
Turnout		1,744		
Registered electors				
Labour hold		Swing		

=== Great Hollands South ===
Great Hollands South By-Election 19 November 1998
Party	Candidate	Votes	%	±%
Labour	John Stefan Piasecki	638	62.2	+18.9
Conservative	Diana Simone Olivia Henfrey	329	32.1	−8.3
Liberal Democrats	David James Maxwell	58	5.7	−10.6
Majority		309	30.1	
Turnout		1,025		
Registered electors				
Labour gain from Conservative		Swing	+13.6	
