= 2000 Bracknell Forest Borough Council election =

2000 local election in Bracknell Forest

← 1997	4 May 2000	2003 →

All 40 seats to Bracknell Forest Borough Council 21 seats needed for a majority
- Turnout: 30% (▼45pp)
	First party	Second party
	Con	Lab
Leader	Paul Bettison	Austin McCormack
Party	Conservative	Labour
Leader's seat	Little Sandhurst	Wildridings
Last election	23 seats	17 seats
Seats won	30	10
Seat change	▲7	▼7
Popular vote	13,428	7,456
Percentage	55.2%	30.7%
Swing	▲10.5%	▼0.5%
Council control before election
Conservative
Council control after election
Conservative

The 2000 Bracknell Forest Borough Council election took place on 4 May 2000, to elect all 40 members in 19 wards for Bracknell Forest Borough Council in England. The election was held on the same day as other local elections in England as part of the 2000 United Kingdom local elections. The Conservative Party secured a second term in office, increasing its majority. As the last council election in 1997 was held alongside the general election, turnout was sharply down.

== Results summary ==
2000 Bracknell Forest Borough Council election
Party	Seats	Gains	Losses	Net gain/loss	Seats %	Votes %	Votes	+/−
Conservative	30	▲8	▼1	▲7	75.0	55.2	13,428	
Labour	10	▲1	▼8	▼7	25.0	30.7	7,456	
Liberal Democrats	0	0	0	0	0.0	10.2	2,490	
Green	0	0	0	0	0.0	2.3	553	
Ind. Conservative	0	0	0	0	0.0	1.6	390	

== Ward results ==
An asterisk (*) denotes an incumbent councillor standing for re-election

=== Ascot ===
Ascot (3)
Party	Candidate	Votes	%	±%
Conservative	Anne Kay Haydon*	1,189	56.4	+5.1
Conservative	Dorothy Andrea Susan Hayes*	1,178		
Conservative	Alan Harold Kendall	1,090		
Labour	Lucy Mary Norman	394	18.7	−5.2
Labour	Robert Edward Draper	363		
Labour	Graham William Firth	342		
Liberal Democrats	Winifred Joyce Booth	316	15.0	−9.9
Liberal Democrats	Ian Richard Campbell-Grant	276		
Liberal Democrats	Jonathan Peter Cross	273		
Green	Derek Norman Wall	210	10.0	New
Turnout			24.0	−45.7
Registered electors		8,152		
Conservative hold		Swing		
Conservative hold		Swing		
Conservative hold		Swing		

=== Binfield ===
Binfield (2)
Party	Candidate	Votes	%	±%
Conservative	Terry Mills*	1,045	54.3	+3.6
Conservative	John Bruce Harrison*	1,022		
Labour	David John Fawcett	488	25.4	+2.9
Ind. Conservative	Hilary Doyle	390	20.3	New
Labour	Robert Martin Woodrow	346		
Turnout			32.5	−43.8
Registered electors		5,280		
Conservative hold		Swing		
Conservative hold		Swing		

=== Bullbrook ===
Bullbrook (3)
Party	Candidate	Votes	%	±%
Conservative	Iain Alexander McCracken	921	50.5	+15.4
Conservative	James Michael Barry Egan*	920		
Conservative	Edward Michael Sargeant	917		
Labour	David George Excell	639	35.0	−1.1
Labour	James Victor Quinton	620		
Labour	John Kenneth Wright	603		
Liberal Democrats	Ronald Henry Hanson	264	14.5	−8.5
Turnout			34.2	−38.4
Registered electors		5,069		
Conservative gain from Labour		Swing		
Conservative hold		Swing		
Conservative hold		Swing		

=== Central Sandhurst ===
Central Sandhurst (2)
Party	Candidate	Votes	%	±%
Conservative	Alan Frederick Ward*	738	67.5	+11.0
Conservative	Peter Laurie North*	649		
Liberal Democrats	Paul Michael Massey	202	18.5	−6.6
Liberal Democrats	Yasmin Anita Mohammed	173		
Labour	Jillian Irene Ryan	111	10.1	−4.3
Green	Teresa Marie Burchnall-Wood	43	3.9	New
Turnout			31.1	−45.7
Registered electors		3,218		
Conservative hold		Swing		
Conservative hold		Swing		

=== College Town ===
College Town (2)
Party	Candidate	Votes	%	±%
Conservative	Robert Cecil Edger	593	56.5	+9.8
Conservative	Raymond Simonds*	539		
Liberal Democrats	Raymond William Earwicker	456	43.5	+5.4
Liberal Democrats	David Mohammed	410		
Turnout			25.6	−44.1
Registered electors		4,085		
Conservative hold		Swing		
Conservative hold		Swing		

=== Cranbourne ===
Cranbourne
Party	Candidate	Votes	%	±%
Conservative	Mary Patricia Ballin*	238	82.9	+15.7
Labour	Anthony Malcolm House	49	17.1	−15.7
Turnout			25.9	−44.1
Registered electors		1,112		
Conservative hold		Swing		

=== Crowthorne ===
Crowthorne (3)
Party	Candidate	Votes	%	±%
Conservative	James George Finnie*	970	72.5	+25.7
Conservative	Robert Hugh Wade*	901		
Conservative	John (Cliff) Clifton Thompson*	877		
Labour	Graham Edward Stuart Vertigen	368	27.5	+4.7
Labour	Sylvia Maria Ruth Trevis	348		
Labour	Susan Dorothy Gurran	346		
Turnout			30.5	−45.1
Registered electors		4,414		
Conservative hold		Swing		
Conservative hold		Swing		
Conservative hold		Swing		

=== Garth ===
Garth (2)
Party	Candidate	Votes	%	±%
Conservative	Jacqueline Doris Sylvia Ryder	558	50.7	+14.6
Labour	Patricia Eira Brown	542	49.3	+2.2
Conservative	Alvin Edwin Finch	533		
Labour	Amanda (Mandy) Jane Williams	495		
Turnout			40.1	−36.3
Registered electors		2,827		
Conservative gain from Labour		Swing		
Labour hold		Swing		

=== Great Hollands North ===
Great Hollands North (2)
Party	Candidate	Votes	%	±%
Labour	Jeananne Margaret Shillcock*	625	67.3	+22.0
Labour	Langdon Richard Jones*	624		
Conservative	Perry Benjamin	304	32.7	−4.5
Conservative	Jean Margaret Bettison	298		
Turnout			28.6	−45.2
Registered electors		3,487		
Labour hold		Swing		
Labour hold		Swing		

=== Great Hollands South ===
Great Hollands South (2)
Party	Candidate	Votes	%	±%
Labour	Michael John Adams*	593	55.2	+11.9
Labour	John Stefan Piasecki*	566		
Conservative	Ian William Leake	481	44.8	+4.4
Conservative	Robert Lauchlan McLean	476		
Turnout			31.5	−38.4
Registered electors		3,512		
Labour hold		Swing		
Labour gain from Conservative		Swing		

=== Hanworth ===
Hanworth (3)
Party	Candidate	Votes	%	±%
Conservative	Martin William Wallace	896	43.3	+6.9
Conservative	Alan Sydney Browne	894		
Conservative	Gillian (Gill) Margaret Birch	840		
Labour	George William Bayle*	775	37.5	−7.4
Labour	Janet Hazel Keene*	771		
Labour	Tom Wheaton*	728		
Liberal Democrats	Vincent Wood	231	11.2	−7.5
Green	John Stuart Fletcher	166	8.0	New
Turnout			29.4	−44.8
Registered electors				
Conservative gain from Labour		Swing		
Conservative gain from Labour		Swing		
Conservative gain from Labour		Swing		

=== Harmans Water ===
Harmans Water (3)
Party	Candidate	Votes	%	±%
Conservative	Shelagh Rosemary Pile*	1,187	57.3	+22.3
Conservative	Christopher Richard Martin Turrell	1,097		
Conservative	Diana Simone Olivia Henfrey	1,090		
Labour	Geoffrey Leslie Freeman	883	42.7	+3.2
Labour	Maureen Elizabeth Beadsley	875		
Labour	Roy John Bailey*	853		
Turnout			33.6	−39.3
Registered electors		6,390		
Conservative gain from Labour		Swing		
Conservative hold		Swing		
Conservative hold		Swing		

=== Little Sandhurst ===
Little Sandhurst (2)
Party	Candidate	Votes	%	±%
Conservative	Paul David Bettison*	649	68.2	+13.2
Conservative	Dale Philip Birch*	633		
Labour	John (Jack) Robert James Delbridge	156	16.4	−2.3
Labour	Clive Urquhart	153		
Liberal Democrats	Stephen Pope	146	15.4	−10.9
Liberal Democrats	Christopher Robin Sexton	130		
Turnout			31.8	−46.0
Registered electors		3,109		
Conservative hold		Swing		
Conservative hold		Swing		

=== Old Bracknell ===
Old Bracknell (3)
Party	Candidate	Votes	%	±%
Labour	Michael John Beadsley*	667	41.3	−2.6
Conservative	Isabel Margaret Mattick	615	38.1	+4.3
Conservative	Andrew (Andy) Duncan Blatchford	603		
Labour	Timothy Hanson	602		
Conservative	Lars Fredrick Arthur Swann	587		
Labour	Colin Terence Williams	581		
Liberal Democrats	David James Maxwell	199	12.3	−4.4
Green	Paul Charles Bennett	134	8.3	New
Turnout			35.6	−39.5
Registered electors		3,942		
Labour hold		Swing		
Conservative gain from Labour		Swing		
Conservative gain from Labour		Swing		

=== Owlsmoor ===
Owlsmoor
Party	Candidate	Votes	%	±%
Conservative	David James Worrall*	619	63.1	+13.4
Liberal Democrats	Reginald Peter John Hodge	362	36.9	+5.1
Turnout			24.2	−49.4
Registered electors		4,139		
Conservative hold		Swing		

=== Priestwood ===
Priestwood (2)
Party	Candidate	Votes	%	±%
Labour	Juliet Mary Clifford*	470	59.8	+15.9
Labour	Edwin Lloyd Glasson	417		
Conservative	Barry Kerslake Kingsbury	316	40.2	+14.5
Conservative	Amanda Colette McLean	311		
Turnout			29.6	−42.9
Registered electors				
Labour hold		Swing		
Labour hold		Swing		

=== St. Marys ===
St. Marys
Party	Candidate	Votes	%	±%
Conservative	Robert Anthony Flood*	462	83.8	+13.3
Liberal Democrats	Rosemary Anne O'Regan	89	16.2	−2.3
Turnout			34.0	−45.4
Registered electors		1,629		
Conservative hold		Swing		

=== Warfield ===
Warfield
Party	Candidate	Votes	%	±%
Conservative	Gareth Michael Barnard	1,275	73.7	+13.9
Labour	Marian Donald Langton	231	13.3	−9.6
Liberal Democrats	Debra Quinn	225	13.0	−4.3
Turnout			26.4	−51.0
Registered electors		6,580		
Conservative hold		Swing		

=== Wildridings ===
Wildridings (2)
Party	Candidate	Votes	%	±%
Labour	Philip Grayson*	465	55.6	+9.2
Labour	Austin John McCormack*	449		
Conservative	Noel William Wreglesworth	372	44.4	+9.8
Conservative	Nicholas Peter Skinner	343		
Turnout			39.0	−38.9
Registered electors		2,185		
Labour hold		Swing		
Labour hold		Swing		

== By-elections ==
=== Hanworth ===
Hanworth By-Election 14 November 2002
Party	Candidate	Votes	%	±%
Conservative	Charles (Chas) Walter Baily	576	40.4	−2.9
Labour	Janet Hazel Keene	521	36.6	−0.9
Liberal Democrats	Larraine Kerry De Laune	137	9.6	−1.6
Green	David Henry Young	120	8.4	+0.4
UKIP	Lawrence John Alan Boxall	71	5.0	New
Majority		55	3.8	
Turnout		1,425		
Registered electors				
Conservative hold		Swing		

=== Priestwood ===
Priestwood By-Election 8 November 2001
Party	Candidate	Votes	%	±%
Labour	David John Fawcett	382	49.0	−10.8
Conservative	Tony Packham	312	40.1	−0.1
Liberal Democrats	Sarah Edwards	85	10.9	New
Majority		70	8.9	
Turnout		779		
Registered electors				
Labour hold		Swing		
