= 1995 Bracknell Forest Borough Council election =

1995 local election in Bracknell Forest

← 1991	4 May 1995	1997 →

All 40 seats to Bracknell Forest Borough Council 21 seats needed for a majority
	First party	Second party	Third party
	Lab	Con	LD
Leader	Austin McCormack	Bob Angell
Party	Labour	Conservative	Liberal Democrats
Leader's seat	Wildridings	Great Hollands South (lost re-election)
Last election	7	32	1
Seats won	22	12	6
Seat change	▲15	▼20	▲5
Popular vote	11,559	11,180	6,682
Percentage	38.8%	37.6%	22.4%
Swing	▲7.7%	▼16.8%	▲7.9%
Council control before election
Conservative
Council control after election
Labour

The 1995 Bracknell Forest Borough Council election took place on 4 May 1995, to elect all 40 members in 19 wards for Bracknell Forest Borough Council in England. The election was held on the same day as other local elections in England & Wales as part of the 1995 United Kingdom local elections. For the first time since 1973, the Labour Party won control of the council, decimating the Conservative Party to less than half the seats it won in 1991, with the Conservative group leader losing his seat in Great Hollands South. This remains the last time the Conservatives have lost the popular vote in a Bracknell Forest Borough Council all-out election.

== Result summary ==
1995 Bracknell Forest Borough Council election
Party	Seats	Gains	Losses	Net gain/loss	Seats %	Votes %	Votes	+/−
Labour	22	▲16	▼1	▲15	55.0	38.8	11,559	
Conservative	12	▲1	▼21	▼20	30.0	37.6	11,180	
Liberal Democrats	6	▲5	0	▲5	15.0	22.4	6,682	
Independent Labour	0	0	0	0	0.0	1.2	347	

== Ward results ==
An asterisk (*) denotes an incumbent councillor standing for re-election

=== Ascot ===
Ascot (3)
Party	Candidate	Votes	%	±%
Conservative	Hayes D. Ms.*	887	33.9	−12.8
Labour	Miller D.	865	33.1	+10.2
Liberal Democrats	Blake J. Ms.	864	33.0	+2.7
Conservative	Herlingshaw L.*	849		
Labour	Norman L. Ms.	832		
Conservative	Thomas G.	810		
Liberal Democrats	Campbell-Grant I.	677		
Liberal Democrats	Harradine A.	616		
Turnout			31.0	−13.2
Registered electors		8,123		
Conservative hold		Swing		
Labour gain from Conservative		Swing		
Liberal Democrats gain from Conservative		Swing		

=== Binfield ===
Binfield (2)
Party	Candidate	Votes	%	±%
Conservative	Doyle H. Ms.*	884	47.8	−21.5
Conservative	Taylor G.*	805		
Labour	Harman J.	597	32.3	+1.6
Labour	Woodrow G. Ms.	541		
Liberal Democrats	Dickson C. Ms.	369	19.9	New
Turnout			35.9	−4.6
Registered electors		4,857		
Conservative hold		Swing		
Conservative hold		Swing		

=== Bullbrook ===
Bullbrook (3)
Party	Candidate	Votes	%	±%
Labour	Ryan P.	865	44.5	−5.0
Labour	Draper R.	798		
Conservative	Egan J.	617	31.7	−18.8
Labour	Darke P.*	589		
Conservative	Barnard G.	579		
Labour	Woodrow R.	563		
Liberal Democrats	Hanson R.	462	23.8	New
Liberal Democrats	Powell E. Ms.	434		
Liberal Democrats	Hughes E. Ms.	432		
Turnout			41.7	−1.4
Registered electors		5,134		
Labour gain from Conservative		Swing		
Labour gain from Conservative		Swing		
Conservative gain from Labour		Swing		

=== College Town ===
College Town (2)
Party	Candidate	Votes	%	±%
Liberal Democrats	Sullivan V. Ms.	720	52.7	+0.6
Liberal Democrats	Neighbour D.*	712		
Conservative	Blatchford A.	421	30.8	−17.1
Conservative	Simonds R.	379		
Labour	Plested I.	225	16.5	New
Turnout			33.7	−9.9
Registered electors		3,970		
Liberal Democrats hold		Swing		
Liberal Democrats gain from Conservative		Swing		

=== Cranbourne ===
Cranbourne
Party	Candidate	Votes	%	±%
Conservative	Ballin M. Ms.*	217	58.5	−10.2
Labour	Friar W.	154	41.5	+10.2
Turnout			34.7	−2.6
Registered electors		1,091		
Conservative hold		Swing		

=== Crowthorne ===
Crowthorne (3)
Party	Candidate	Votes	%	±%
Liberal Democrats	Pope S.	716	43.2	+6.8
Liberal Democrats	Maxwell D.	642		
Conservative	Finnie J.*	642	38.7	−24.9
Liberal Democrats	Scovell L.	635		
Conservative	Cheney A.*	611		
Conservative	Pierce-Jones M. Ms.	591		
Labour	Davies H.	301	18.1	New
Labour	Hammond B.	299		
Labour	Geary E.	297		
Turnout			41.6	−7.2
Registered electors		4,131		
Liberal Democrats gain from Conservative		Swing		
Liberal Democrats gain from Conservative		Swing		
Conservative hold		Swing		

=== Garth ===
Garth (2)
Party	Candidate	Votes	%	±%
Labour	Good D.*	828	55.9	+4.8
Labour	Taylor S.	780		
Conservative	Ryder J. Ms.	506	34.2	−14.7
Conservative	Harrison J.	440		
Liberal Democrats	Willians T.	146	9.9	New
Turnout			50.7	−2.3
Registered electors		2,931		
Labour hold		Swing		
Labour hold		Swing		

=== Great Hollands North ===
Great Hollands North (2)
Party	Candidate	Votes	%	±%
Labour	Jones L.	880	62.5	+15.1
Labour	Shillcock J. Ms.	869		
Conservative	Drury D.	529	37.5	−15.1
Conservative	Thomson A.	520		
Turnout			43.4	−1.5
Registered electors		3,617		
Labour gain from Conservative		Swing		
Labour gain from Conservative		Swing		

=== Great Hollands South ===
Great Hollands South (2)
Party	Candidate	Votes	%	±%
Labour	Adams M.	686	46.4	+14.4
Labour	King S.	667		
Conservative	Angell R.*	588	39.8	−9.8
Conservative	Angell J. Ms.	578		
Liberal Democrats	Shepherd J.	204	13.8	−4.6
Turnout			41.5	−8.2
Registered electors		3,547		
Labour gain from Conservative		Swing		
Labour gain from Conservative		Swing		

=== Hanworth ===
Hanworth (3)
Party	Candidate	Votes	%	±%
Labour	Keene J. Ms.	1,358	51.3	+2.1
Labour	Wheaton T.	1,297		
Labour	Vertigen G.	1,196		
Conservative	Henfrey D. Ms.	863	32.6	−18.2
Conservative	Browne A.*	861		
Conservative	Wallace M.*	834		
Liberal Democrats	Macmahon T.	424	16.0	New
Turnout			42.0	−4.5
Registered electors		6,117		
Labour gain from Conservative		Swing		
Labour gain from Conservative		Swing		
Labour gain from Conservative		Swing		

=== Harmanswater ===
Harmanswater (3)
Party	Candidate	Votes	%	±%
Labour	Jones S. Ms.	1,342	51.3	+7.1
Labour	Onions W.	1,309		
Labour	Simmonds S.	1,226		
Conservative	McCracken I.	923	35.3	−20.5
Conservative	Pile S. Ms.*	902		
Conservative	McCracken J. Ms.	870		
Liberal Democrats	Callan B.	349	13.4	New
Turnout			40.3	−4.3
Registered electors		6,356		
Labour gain from Conservative		Swing		
Labour gain from Conservative		Swing		
Labour gain from Conservative		Swing		

=== Little Sandhurst ===
Little Sandhurst (2)
Party	Candidate	Votes	%	±%
Conservative	Bettison P.*	657	48.0	−15.5
Conservative	Birch D.*	598		
Liberal Democrats	Bastone S. Ms.	366	26.7	−9.8
Labour	Urquhart C.	347	25.3	New
Labour	Hasemore K.	307		
Liberal Democrats	Nicholson J.	266		
Turnout			42.4	−9.5
Registered electors		3,140		
Conservative hold		Swing		
Conservative hold		Swing		

=== Old Bracknell ===
Old Bracknell (3)
Party	Candidate	Votes	%	±%
Labour	Bayle G.	1,077	60.3	+11.6
Labour	Hirst B. Ms.	1,048		
Labour	Veakins D.	1,026		
Conservative	Ashcroft E. Ms.	480	26.9	−24.4
Conservative	Mattick I. Ms.*	478		
Conservative	Brown B. Ms.	449		
Liberal Democrats	Cole L.	229	12.8	New
Liberal Democrats	Hayward J.	211		
Turnout			45.5	−3.1
Registered electors		3,908		
Labour gain from Conservative		Swing		
Labour gain from Conservative		Swing		
Labour gain from Conservative		Swing		

=== Owlsmoor ===
Owlsmoor
Party	Candidate	Votes	%	±%
Liberal Democrats	Hodge R.	694	46.3	+7.4
Conservative	Thomas R.*	562	37.5	−23.6
Labour	Smith R.	242	16.2	New
Turnout			37.3	+0.1
Registered electors		4,105		
Liberal Democrats gain from Conservative		Swing		

=== Priestwood ===
Priestwood (2)
Party	Candidate	Votes	%	±%
Labour	Clifford J. Ms.	567	41.4	−15.0
Labour	Fawcett D.	387		
Conservative	Kingsbury B.	354	25.9	−17.7
Independent Labour	Cooper P.* (Note: Cooper and Tompkins were elected as Labour Party candidates in 1991.)	347	25.4	New
Conservative	Zimehl J. Ms.	316		
Independent Labour	Tompkins J.*	316		
Liberal Democrats	Ford G.	100	7.3	New
Turnout			48.5	−3.9
Registered electors		2,712		
Labour hold		Swing		
Labour hold		Swing		

=== Sandhurst ===
Sandhurst (2)
Party	Candidate	Votes	%	±%
Conservative	Ward A.*	661	44.1	−20.6
Conservative	North P.	651		
Liberal Democrats	Score J.	623	41.6	+6.3
Liberal Democrats	Earwicker R.	550		
Labour	Trevis S. Ms.	215	14.3	New
Turnout			46.9	−2.0
Registered electors		3,144		
Conservative hold		Swing		
Conservative hold		Swing		

=== St. Marys ===
St. Marys
Party	Candidate	Votes	%	±%
Conservative	Flood R.	349	67.2	−32.8
Labour	Draper C. Ms.	170	32.8	New
Turnout			33.1	N/A
Registered electors		1,584		
Conservative hold		Swing		

=== Warfield ===
Warfield
Party	Candidate	Votes	%	±%
Conservative	Sargeant E.*	680	55.7	−27.6
Liberal Democrats	Boyd L. Ms.	292	23.9	New
Labour	Clifton L. Ms.	248	20.3	+3.6
Turnout			32.2	−12.1
Registered electors		3,841		
Conservative hold		Swing		

=== Wildridings ===
Wildridings (2)
Party	Candidate	Votes	%	±%
Labour	Grayson P.	592	55.0	+3.2
Labour	McCormack A.*	591		
Conservative	Wreglesworth M. Ms.	360	33.5	−14.7
Conservative	Wreglesworth N.	335		
Liberal Democrats	Carson C.	124	11.5	New
Labour	Dossett P.*	100		
Turnout			52.0	+0.9
Registered electors		2,208		
Labour hold		Swing		
Labour hold		Swing		
