= 1991 Bracknell Forest Borough Council election =

1991 local election in Bracknell Forest

← 1987	2 May 1991	1995 →

All 40 seats to Bracknell Forest Borough Council 21 seats needed for a majority
	First party	Second party	Third party
	Con	Lab	LD
Leader	Alan Ward	John Tompkins (Note: Tompkins became the lone Labour councillor after a by-election)
Party	Conservative	Labour	Liberal Democrats
Leader's seat	Sandhurst	Priestwood
Last election	40	0	0
Seats won	32	7	1
Seat change	▼8	▲7	▲1
Popular vote	16,301	9,309	4,332
Percentage	54.4%	31.1%	14.5%
Swing	▼0.4%	▲15.0%	▼13.7%
Council control before election
Conservative
Council control after election
Conservative

The 1991 Bracknell Forest Borough Council election took place on 2 May 1991, to elect all 40 members in 19 wards for Bracknell Forest Borough Council in England. The election was held on the same day as other local elections as part of the 1991 United Kingdom local elections. For the first time since 1979, opposition parties re-entered the council at an all-out council election, but the Conservative Party still managed to secure a landslide victory.

== Summary ==
Votes for the Liberal Democrats are compared against the SDP–Liberal Alliance in 1987.

1991 Bracknell Forest Borough Council election
Party	Seats	Gains	Losses	Net gain/loss	Seats %	Votes %	Votes	+/−
Conservative	32	0	▼8	▼8	80.0	54.4	16,301	
Labour	7	▲7	0	▲7	17.5	31.1	9,309	
Liberal Democrats	1	▲1	0	▲1	2.5	14.5	4,332	

== Ward results ==
An asterisk (*) denotes an incumbent councillor standing for re-election.

Votes for the Liberal Democrats are compared against the SDP–Liberal Alliance in 1987.

=== Ascot ===
Ascot (3)
Party	Candidate	Votes	%	±%
Conservative	Cahill S.	1,547	46.7	−10.8
Conservative	Herlingshaw L.	1,381		
Conservative	Drury D.*	1,329		
Liberal Democrats	Veakins D.	1,004	30.3	−2.4
Labour	Miller D.	759	22.9	+13.1
Labour	Draper R.	715		
Turnout			44.2	−3.6
Registered electors		7,483		
Conservative hold		Swing		
Conservative hold		Swing		
Conservative hold		Swing		

=== Binfield ===
Binfield (2)
Party	Candidate	Votes	%	±%
Conservative	Doyle H. Ms.	992	69.3	+11.1
Conservative	Taylor G.*	935		
Labour	Williams A. Ms.	439	30.7	+17.6
Labour	Harman J.	434		
Turnout			40.5	−14.9
Registered electors		3,463		
Conservative hold		Swing		
Conservative hold		Swing		

=== Bullbrook ===
Bullbrook (3)
Party	Candidate	Votes	%	±%
Conservative	Eason E.	1,094	50.5	−1.5
Conservative	Thompson E.*	1,071		
Labour	Darke P.	1,071	49.5	+30.6
Conservative	Albrecht R.*	1,059		
Labour	Firth G.	1,032		
Labour	Williams C.	989		
Turnout			43.1	+1.2
Registered electors		4,891		
Conservative hold		Swing		
Conservative hold		Swing		
Labour gain from Conservative		Swing		

=== College Town ===
College Town (2)
Party	Candidate	Votes	%	±%
Liberal Democrats	Murray A.	796	52.1	+14.0
Conservative	Edger R.	733	47.9	−4.5
Liberal Democrats	Earwicker R.	691		
Conservative	Simonds R.*	673		
Turnout			43.6	−5.1
Registered electors		3,319		
Liberal Democrats gain from Conservative		Swing		
Conservative hold		Swing		

=== Cranbourne ===
Cranbourne
Party	Candidate	Votes	%	±%
Conservative	Ballin M. Ms.*	252	68.7	−8.3
Labour	Simmonds S.	115	31.3	New
Turnout			37.3	−2.6
Registered electors		985		
Conservative hold		Swing		

=== Crowthorne ===
Crowthorne (3)
Party	Candidate	Votes	%	±%
Conservative	Finnie J.*	1,153	63.6	+6.7
Conservative	Cheney A.*	1,070		
Conservative	Thomas C. Ms.	907		
Liberal Democrats	Maxwell D.	661	36.4	+0.7
Turnout			48.8	−2.7
Registered electors		3,716		
Conservative hold		Swing		
Conservative hold		Swing		
Conservative hold		Swing		

=== Garth ===
Garth (2)
Party	Candidate	Votes	%	±%
Labour	Clifford J. Ms.	804	51.1	+24.2
Labour	Good D.	788		
Conservative	Ryder J. Ms.*	769	48.9	−1.5
Conservative	Wentzell P.	674		
Turnout			53.0	+0.6
Registered electors		2,865		
Labour gain from Conservative		Swing		
Labour gain from Conservative		Swing		

=== Great Hollands North ===
Great Hollands North (2)
Party	Candidate	Votes	%	±%
Conservative	Bouchard J. Ms.*	786	52.6	−0.1
Conservative	Edmeades M. Ms.	732		
Labour	Shillcock J. Ms.	709	47.4	+24.1
Labour	Adams M.	693		
Turnout			44.9	+5.2
Registered electors		3,255		
Conservative hold		Swing		
Conservative hold		Swing		

=== Great Hollands South ===
Great Hollands South (2)
Party	Candidate	Votes	%	±%
Conservative	Angell R.*	825	49.6	−13.4
Conservative	Price C. Ms.	765		
Labour	King S.	532	32.0	+16.4
Labour	Temperton C.	506		
Liberal Democrats	Baker C.	307	18.4	−2.9
Turnout			49.7	+6.0
Registered electors		3,346		
Conservative hold		Swing		
Conservative hold		Swing		

=== Hanworth ===
Hanworth (3)
Party	Candidate	Votes	%	±%
Conservative	Wallace M.*	1,381	50.8	+1.1
Conservative	Ince J.*	1,365		
Conservative	Browne A.	1,362		
Labour	Bayle M. Ms.	1,337	49.2	+28.4
Labour	Gray A.	1,257		
Labour	Wheaton T.	1,209		
Turnout			46.5	−1.6
Registered electors		5,666		
Conservative hold		Swing		
Conservative hold		Swing		
Conservative hold		Swing		

=== Harmanswater ===
Harmanswater (3)
Party	Candidate	Votes	%	±%
Conservative	Mills T.*	1,508	55.8	+2.8
Conservative	Ainscough T.*	1,497		
Conservative	Pile S. Ms.	1,438		
Labour	Holness W.	1,193	44.2	+24.0
Labour	Pitt K.	1,144		
Labour	Waddington A.	1,116		
Turnout			44.6	−2.0
Registered electors		5,895		
Conservative hold		Swing		
Conservative hold		Swing		
Conservative hold		Swing		

=== Little Sandhurst ===
Little Sandhurst (2)
Party	Candidate	Votes	%	±%
Conservative	Birch D.*	981	63.5	+9.1
Conservative	Cohen H.*	870		
Liberal Democrats	Cole L.	565	36.5	+2.8
Turnout			51.9	−5.2
Registered electors		2,979		
Conservative hold		Swing		
Conservative hold		Swing		

=== Old Bracknell ===
Old Bracknell (3)
Party	Candidate	Votes	%	±%
Conservative	Beasley C.	922	51.3	+3.6
Conservative	Mattick I. Ms.*	908		
Conservative	Mullins A.	895		
Labour	Snelgrove A. Ms.	877	48.7	+25.4
Labour	Waudby M. Ms.	861		
Labour	Smith R.	852		
Turnout			48.6	+5.7
Registered electors		3,642		
Conservative hold		Swing		
Conservative hold		Swing		
Conservative hold		Swing		

=== Owlsmoor ===
Owlsmoor
Party	Candidate	Votes	%	±%
Conservative	Thomas R.*	825	61.1	+2.4
Liberal Democrats	Longhurst L.	526	38.9	+2.1
Turnout			37.2	−8.5
Registered electors		3,633		
Conservative hold		Swing		

=== Priestwood ===
Priestwood (2)
Party	Candidate	Votes	%	±%
Labour	Cooper P.	778	56.4	+20.0
Labour	Tompkins J.	773		
Conservative	Blake L.*	602	43.6	+0.9
Conservative	Egan J.	578		
Turnout			52.4	−0.2
Registered electors		2,609		
Labour gain from Conservative		Swing		
Labour gain from Conservative		Swing		

=== Sandhurst ===
Sandhurst (2)
Party	Candidate	Votes	%	±%
Conservative	Marsden J.*	867	64.7	+1.7
Conservative	Ward A.*	846		
Liberal Democrats	Nicholson D. Ms.	473	35.3	+12.7
Liberal Democrats	Meller S.	447		
Turnout			44.9	−3.4
Registered electors		2,936		
Conservative hold		Swing		
Conservative hold		Swing		

=== St. Marys ===
St. Marys
Party	Candidate	Votes	%	±%
Conservative	Warren J.*	Unopposed		
Turnout			N/A	
Registered electors		1,260		
Conservative hold		Swing		

=== Warfield ===
Warfield
Party	Candidate	Votes	%	±%
Conservative	Sargeant E.	514	83.3	+6.3
Labour	Hirst W.	103	16.7	+10.0
Turnout			44.3	−1.3
Registered electors		1,392		
Conservative hold		Swing		

=== Wildridings ===
Wildridings (2)
Party	Candidate	Votes	%	±%
Labour	Dossett P.	592	51.8	+35.7
Labour	McCormack A.	563		
Conservative	Mattick J.*	550	48.2	+3.9
Conservative	Wreglesworth N.*	545		
Turnout			51.1	−3.2
Registered electors		2,202		
Labour gain from Conservative		Swing		
Labour gain from Conservative		Swing		
