= 2003 Bracknell Forest Borough Council election =

2003 local election in Bracknell Forest

← 2000	1 May 2003	2007 →

All 42 seats to Bracknell Forest Borough Council 22 seats needed for a majority
- Turnout: 31% (▲1pp)
	First party	Second party	Third party
	Con	Lab	LD
Leader	Paul Bettison	Austin McCormack	N/A
Party	Conservative	Labour	Liberal Democrats
Leader's seat	Little Sandhurst & Wellington	Ran in Wildridings & Central (lost)	N/A
Last election	30 seats	10 seats	0 seats
Seats won	35	6	1
Seat change	▲5	▼4	▲1
Popular vote	13,621	7,774	4,121
Percentage	50.1%	28.6%	15.2%
Swing	▼5.1%	▼2.1%	▲5.0%
- Results of the 2003 Bracknell Forest Borough Council election
Council control before election
Conservative
Council control after election
Conservative

The 2003 Bracknell Forest Borough Council election took place on 1 May 2003, to elect all 42 councillors in 18 wards for Bracknell Forest Borough Council in England. The election was held on the same day as other local elections in England as part of the 2003 United Kingdom local elections. Due to a boundary review there had been a change in ward boundaries, along with an increase in size from 40 members elected in 2000. The Conservative Party secured a third term in office, increasing its majority, whilst the opposition Labour Party lost its group leader. The Liberal Democrats re-entered the council for the first time at an all-out council election since 1995, and the first at which the eurosceptic UK Independence Party stood a candidate.

== Ward results ==
=== Ascot ===
Ascot (2)
Party	Candidate	Votes	%	±%
Conservative	Dorothy Andrea Susan Hayes	712	57.0	
Conservative	Anne Kay Haydon	708		
Labour	Robert Edward Draper	204	16.3	
Liberal Democrats	Jonathan Peter Cross	188	15.0	
Liberal Democrats	Ian Richard Campbell-Grant	149		
Green	Derek Norman Wall	146	11.7	
Turnout			29.4	
Registered electors		3,931		
Conservative win (new seat)				
Conservative win (new seat)				

=== Binfield with Warfield ===
Binfield with Warfield (3)
Party	Candidate	Votes	%	±%
Conservative	Terry Mills	1,159	39.1	
Conservative	John Bruce Harrison	1,127		
Conservative	Ian William Leake	1,055		
Liberal Democrats	Michael John Hawkins	676	22.8	
Labour	David John Fawcett	570	19.2	
Independent	Hilary Doyle	560	18.9	
Independent	Kevin Alan Harvey	417		
Turnout			34.4	
Registered electors		5,854		
Conservative win (new seat)				
Conservative win (new seat)				
Conservative win (new seat)				

=== Bullbrook ===
Bullbrook (2)
Party	Candidate	Votes	%	±%
Conservative	Iain Alexander McCracken	715	53.4	
Conservative	Edward Michael Sargeant	713		
Labour	David George Excell	450	29.5	
Labour	Allan Hylton Scorer	395		
Liberal Democrats	Ronald Henry Hanson	230	17.2	
Turnout			36.0	
Registered electors		3,718		
Conservative win (new seat)				
Conservative win (new seat)				

=== Central Sandhurst ===
Central Sandhurst (2)
Party	Candidate	Votes	%	±%
Conservative	Alan Frederick Ward	631	38.9	
Conservative	Peter Laurie North	548		
Liberal Democrats	Stephen Pope	355	21.9	
Labour	Sylvia Maria Ruth Trevis	270	16.6	
UKIP	Lawrence John Alan Boxall	190	11.7	
Green	Teresa Marie Burchnall-Wood	177	10.9	
Turnout			29.7	
Registered electors		4,011		
Conservative win (new seat)				
Conservative win (new seat)				

=== College Town ===
College Town (2)
Party	Candidate	Votes	%	±%
Conservative	Robert Cecil Edger	540	51.4	
Liberal Democrats	Raymond William Earwicker	510	48.6	
Conservative	Raymond Simonds	505		
Liberal Democrats	Reginald Peter John Hodge	472		
Turnout			29.3	
Registered electors		3,665		
Conservative win (new seat)				
Liberal Democrats win (new seat)				

=== Crown Wood ===
Crown Wood (3)
Party	Candidate	Votes	%	±%
Conservative	Marc Brunel-Walker	725	47.4	
Conservative	Colin Reginald Dudley	692		
Conservative	Robert Charles Osborne	648		
Labour	Wilford Theophilus Holness	612	40.0	
Labour	Roy John Bailey	563		
Labour	Joyce Edna Still	529		
Green	Paul Lynton Harper	194	12.7	
Turnout			25.4	
Registered electors		5,829		
Conservative win (new seat)				
Conservative win (new seat)				
Conservative win (new seat)				

=== Crowthorne ===
Crowthorne (2)
Party	Candidate	Votes	%	±%
Conservative	James George Finnie	744	53.6	
Conservative	Robert Hugh Wade	649		
Liberal Democrats	Anne Barbara Swann	382	27.5	
Liberal Democrats	James Jeffrey Retallic	322		
Labour	Graham Edward Stuart Vertigen	263	18.9	
Turnout			34.3	
Registered electors		3,679		
Conservative win (new seat)				
Conservative win (new seat)				

=== Great Hollands North ===
Great Hollands North (2)
Party	Candidate	Votes	%	±%
Labour	Jeananne Margaret Shillcock	498	66.6	
Labour	Langdon Richard Jones	490		
Conservative	Amanda Collette McLean	250	33.4	
Conservative	Nicholas Peter Skinner	228		
Turnout			26.2	
Registered electors		3,025		
Labour win (new seat)				
Labour win (new seat)				

=== Great Hollands South ===
Great Hollands South (2)
Party	Candidate	Votes	%	±%
Labour	Michael John Adams	614	50.6	
Labour	John Stefan Piasecki	604		
Conservative	Jennifer Ann McCracken	599	49.4	
Conservative	Lars Fredrick Arthur Swann	552		
Turnout			31.9	
Registered electors		3,878		
Labour win (new seat)				
Labour win (new seat)				

=== Hanworth ===
Hanworth (3)
Party	Candidate	Votes	%	±%
Conservative	Charles (Chas) Walter Baily	939	44.5	
Conservative	Gillian (Gill) Margaret Birch	871		
Conservative	Alan Sydney Browne	861		
Labour	Janet Hazel Keene	633	30.0	
Labour	James Lawrence Walsh	566		
Green	David Henry Young	306	14.5	
Green	David Andrew Collins	243		
Liberal Democrats	Evelyn May Hughes	232	11.0	
Liberal Democrats	Larraine Kerry De Laune	222		
Green	Paul Charles Bennett	205		
Turnout			30.3	
Registered electors		6,386		
Conservative win (new seat)				
Conservative win (new seat)				
Conservative win (new seat)				

=== Harmans Water ===
Crown Wood (3)
Party	Candidate	Votes	%	±%
Conservative	Shelagh Rosemary Pile	1,122	67.7	
Conservative	Ian Christopher Douglas Mihell	1,082		
Conservative	Christopher Richard Martin Turrell	1,067		
Labour	Geoffrey Leslie Freeman	535	32.3	
Labour	John Kenneth Wright	500		
Labour	Alec Keene	494		
Turnout			32.6	
Registered electors		5,192		
Conservative win (new seat)				
Conservative win (new seat)				
Conservative win (new seat)				

=== Little Sandhurst & Wellington ===
Little Sandhurst & Wellington (2)
Party	Candidate	Votes	%	±%
Conservative	Paul David Bettison	806	69.3	
Conservative	Dale Philip Birch	776		
Labour	John (Jack) Robert Delbridge	357	30.7	
Labour	Jonathan George Keen	330		
Turnout			30.8	
Registered electors		3,889		
Conservative win (new seat)				
Conservative win (new seat)				

=== Old Bracknell ===
Old Bracknell (2)
Party	Candidate	Votes	%	±%
Labour	Maureen Elizabeth Beadsley	628	44.9	
Labour	Michael John Beadsley	624		
Conservative	Isabel Margaret Mattick	565	40.4	
Conservative	Andrew (Andy) Duncan Blatchford	534		
Liberal Democrats	Lesley Marion Tooze	126	9.0	
Green	Gillian Annette Nicholas	79	5.7	
Turnout			35.5	
Registered electors		3,740		
Labour win (new seat)				
Labour win (new seat)				

=== Owlsmoor ===
Owlsmoor (2)
Party	Candidate	Votes	%	±%
Conservative	David James Worrall	582	47.0	
Conservative	Richard Hugh Thomas	580		
Liberal Democrats	David Mohammed	348	28.1	
Labour	Brian David Wilson	309	24.9	
Turnout			26.6	
Registered electors		3,946		
Conservative win (new seat)				
Conservative win (new seat)				

=== Priestwood & Garth ===
Priestwood & Garth (3)
Party	Candidate	Votes	%	±%
Conservative	Tony Packham	1,038	50.5	
Conservative	Jacqueline Doris Sylvia Ryder	1,000		
Conservative	Alvin Edwin Finch	935		
Labour	Dennis Rueben Good	780	38.0	
Labour	Amanda (Mandy) Jane Williams	769		
Labour	Colin Terence Williams	692		
Liberal Democrats	Aileen Moira Aveling	237	11.5	
Turnout			35.6	
Registered electors		5,554		
Conservative win (new seat)				
Conservative win (new seat)				
Conservative win (new seat)				

=== Warfield Harvest Ride ===
Warfield Harvest Ride (3)
Party	Candidate	Votes	%	±%
Conservative	Gareth Michael Barnard	1,078	55.4	
Conservative	Robert Lauchlan McLean	994		
Conservative	John (Cliff) Clifton Thompson	909		
Liberal Democrats	Martyn Jon Towle	500	25.7	
Labour	Marian Donald Langton	367	18.9	
Labour	Patricia Eira Brown	303		
Turnout			27.7	
Registered electors		5,442		
Conservative win (new seat)				
Conservative win (new seat)				
Conservative win (new seat)				

=== Wildridings & Central ===
Wildridings & Central (2)
Party	Candidate	Votes	%	±%
Conservative	Philip Grayson (Note: Grayson was elected as a Labour Party candidate in 2000.)	609	53.8	
Conservative	Emma Catherine Duncan Barnard	603		
Labour	Austin John McCormack	524	46.2	
Labour	Richard Francis Mills	504		
Turnout			35.0	
Registered electors		3,356		
Conservative win (new seat)				
Conservative win (new seat)				

=== Winkfield & Cranbourne ===
Winkfield & Cranbourne (2)
Party	Candidate	Votes	%	±%
Conservative	Mary Patricia Ballin	807	61.0	
Conservative	Alan Harold Kendall	802		
Liberal Democrats	Stuart Stanley Tarrant	357	27.0	
Liberal Democrats	David James Maxwell	231		
Labour	Anthony Malcolm House	160	12.1	
Turnout			34.9	
Registered electors		3,721		
Conservative win (new seat)				
Conservative win (new seat)				

== By-elections ==
=== Binfield with Warfield ===
Binfield with Warfield By-Election 23 March 2006
Party	Candidate	Votes	%	±%
Conservative	Brenda Dorothy Wilson	921	55.5	+16.4
Liberal Democrats	Michael John Hawkins	444	26.8	+4.0
Labour	David John Fawcett	174	10.5	−8.7
UKIP	Jeffrey Alan Newbold	119	7.2	New
Majority		477	28.7	
Turnout		1,658	28	
Registered electors		5,856		
Conservative hold		Swing		
