= 2011 Bracknell Forest Borough Council election =

2011 local election in Bracknell Forest

← 2007	5 May 2011	2015 →

All 42 seats to Bracknell Forest Borough Council 22 seats needed for a majority
- Turnout: 40% (▲6pp)
	First party	Second party
	Con	Lab
Leader	Paul Bettison	Anne Shillcock
Party	Conservative	Labour
Leader's seat	Little Sandhurst & Wellington	Great Hollands North (lost re-election)
Last election	39 seats, 55.8%	3 seats, 21.2%
Seats won	40	2
Seat change	▲1	▼1
Popular vote	20,267	9,983
Percentage	57.5%	28.3%
Swing	▲1.7%	▲7.1%
- Results of the 2011 Bracknell Forest Borough Council election
Council control before election
Conservative
Council control after election
Conservative

The 2011 Bracknell Forest Borough Council election took place on 5 May 2011, to elect all 42 councillors in 18 wards for Bracknell Forest Borough Council in England. The election was held on the same day as other local elections in England as part of the 2011 United Kingdom local elections. Despite an increase in its popular vote, the Labour Party was reduced to 2 seats, losing its group leader, whilst the Conservative Party secured a fifth term in office.

== Ward results ==
An asterisk (*) denotes an incumbent councillor standing for re-election

=== Ascot ===
Ascot (2)
Party	Candidate	Votes	%	±%
Conservative	Dorothy Andrea Susan Hayes*	1,298	74.5	+3.0
Conservative	Anthony Charles Virgo*	1,151		
Labour	Lesley Margaret Hunter	445	25.5	+13.7
Labour	Sarah Louise Marguerite Quinton	323		
Turnout			44.8	+11.8
Registered electors		4,079		
Conservative hold		Swing		
Conservative hold		Swing		

=== Binfield with Warfield ===
Binfield with Warfield (3)
Party	Candidate	Votes	%	±%
Conservative	John Bruce Harrison*	1,738	49.3	+1.2
Conservative	Ian William Leake*	1,622		
Conservative	Brenda Dorothy Wilson*	1,458		
Binfield Independent Conservatives	Nigel John Rennie	1,059	30.1	New
Labour	David John Fawcett	727	20.6	+8.1
Labour	Christopher David Matthew Theobald	533		
Turnout			44.8	+9.8
Registered electors		6,604		
Conservative hold		Swing		
Conservative hold		Swing		
Conservative hold		Swing		

=== Bullbrook ===
Bullbrook (2 seats)
Party	Candidate	Votes	%	±%
Conservative	Michael Sargeant	968	59.3	+2.3
Conservative	Robert Angell	961		
Labour	John Fitzgerald Bacon	665	40.7	+21.1
Labour	Graham William Firth	641		
Turnout			38.9	+2.9
Registered electors		4,448		
Conservative hold		Swing		
Conservative hold		Swing		

=== Central Sandhurst ===
Central Sandhurst (2 seats)
Party	Candidate	Votes	%	±%
Conservative	Michael Richard Brossard*	1,131	73.2	+20.3
Conservative	Alan Frederick Ward*	1,083		
Labour	Martin George Trevis	415	26.8	+10.9
Labour	Angela June Holley	412		
Turnout			41.6	+7.6
Registered electors		3,900		
Conservative hold		Swing		
Conservative hold		Swing		

=== College Town ===
College Town (2 seats)
Party	Candidate	Votes	%	±%
Conservative	Nicholas Mark Allen	962	62.3	+8.3
Conservative	Andrew Duncan Blatchford*	901		
Labour	Ian Plested	350	22.7	+16.1
Labour	Jeremy John Preece	326		
Liberal Democrats	Mark James Thompson	232	15.0	−14.1
Liberal Democrats	Darren Antony Bridgman	192		
Turnout			33.3	+0.3
Registered electors		4,678		
Conservative hold		Swing		
Conservative hold		Swing		

=== Crown Wood ===
Crown Wood (3)
Party	Candidate	Votes	%	±%
Conservative	Colin Reginald Dudley*	1,144	58.2	+7.9
Conservative	Marc Brunel-Walker*	1,111		
Conservative	Suki Alanna Hayes	1,009		
Labour	Wilford Theophilus Holness	822	41.8	+17.9
Labour	John Kenneth Wright	716		
Labour	Peter Charles Frewer	686		
Turnout			34.8	+5.8
Registered electors		5,963		
Conservative hold		Swing		
Conservative hold		Swing		
Conservative hold		Swing		

=== Crowthorne ===
Crowthorne (2)
Party	Candidate	Votes	%	±%
Conservative	James George Finnie*	1,142	60.9	−15.4
Conservative	Robert Hugh Wade*	1,062		
Labour	Jonathan George Keen	370	19.7	−4.0
Liberal Democrats	Michael Briggs	363	19.4	New
Labour	Phillip Mark Keene	264		
Turnout			45.4	+13.4
Registered electors		3,900		
Conservative hold		Swing		
Conservative hold		Swing		

=== Great Hollands North ===
Great Hollands North (2)
Party	Candidate	Votes	%	±%
Labour	Mary Louise Temperton	734	47.1	+2.8
Conservative	Michael Gbadebo	645	41.4	−0.2
Labour	Jeananne Margaret Shillcock*	640		
Conservative	Bruce McKenzie-Boyle	621		
Green	Mark Daniel Brown	178	11.4	New
Turnout			38.3	+4.3
Registered electors		4,081		
Labour hold		Swing		
Conservative hold		Swing		

=== Great Hollands South ===
Great Hollands South (2 seats)
Party	Candidate	Votes	%	±%
Conservative	Jennifer McCracken*	935	60.9	+14.9
Conservative	Janice Ann Angell*	859		
Labour	Stephen Geoffrey Young	600	39.1	−2.4
Labour	Keith Howard George Roberts	562		
Turnout			40.9	+1.9
Registered electors		3,827		
Conservative hold		Swing		
Conservative hold		Swing		

=== Hanworth ===
Hanworth (3)
Party	Candidate	Votes	%	±%
Conservative	Charles Walter Baily*	1,409	52.6	−4.0
Conservative	William Davison	1,240		
Conservative	Gillian Margaret Birch*	1,210		
Labour	Janet Hazel Keene	903	33.7	+6.8
Labour	Kathleen Mary Nugent	776		
Labour	Grant David Strudley	631		
Independent	Philip Vincent Marshall Pitt	369	13.8	New
Turnout			40.2	+7.2
Registered electors		6,161		
Conservative hold		Swing		
Conservative hold		Swing		
Conservative hold		Swing		

=== Harmans Water ===
Harmans Water (3)
Party	Candidate	Votes	%	±%
Conservative	Shelagh Rosemary Pile*	1,421	60.6	−9.0
Conservative	Trevor Graham Kensall*	1,397		
Conservative	Christopher Richard Martin Turrell*	1,290		
Labour	Geoffrey Leslie Freeman	659	28.1	+8.2
Labour	Timothy Hanson	587		
Labour	Clive Temperton	535		
UKIP	Malcolm David Powell	265	11.3	+0.8
Turnout			38.6	+3.6
Registered electors		5,952		
Conservative hold		Swing		
Conservative hold		Swing		
Conservative hold		Swing		

=== Little Sandhurst & Wellington ===
Little Sandhurst & Wellington (2 seats)
Party	Candidate	Votes	%	±%
Conservative	Dale Philip Birch*	1,104	62.1	0.0
Conservative	Paul David Bettison*	1,101		
Liberal Democrats	Raymond William Earwicker	370	20.8	−3.1
Liberal Democrats	Stephen Pope	322		
Labour	John Robert James Delbridge	303	17.1	+3.1
Labour	John Stefan Piasecki	239		
Turnout			44.0	+8.0
Registered electors		4,114		
Conservative hold		Swing		
Conservative hold		Swing		

=== Old Bracknell ===
Old Bracknell (2 seats)
Party	Candidate	Votes	%	±%
Conservative	Iain Alexander McCracken	824	51.6	+10.0
Conservative	William Peter Heydon	784		
Labour	Roy John Bailey	774	48.4	+1.8
Labour	Alan Harold Round	736		
Turnout			39.6	+3.6
Registered electors		4,121		
Conservative gain from Labour		Swing		
Conservative gain from Labour		Swing		

=== Owlsmoor ===
Owlsmoor (2 seats)
Party	Candidate	Votes	%	±%
Conservative	Phillip John Porter	909	62.0	+6.0
Conservative	David James Worrall*	900		
Labour	Guy Alexander Gillbe	285	19.4	New
Liberal Democrats	Reginald Peter Hodge	272	18.6	New
Labour	Brian David Wilson	266		
Liberal Democrats	David Mohammed	217		
Turnout			39.6	+8.6
Registered electors		3,923		
Conservative hold		Swing		
Conservative hold		Swing		

=== Priestwood & Garth ===
Priestwood & Garth (3)
Party	Candidate	Votes	%	±%
Conservative	Alvin Edwin Finch*	842	43.1	−8.8
Conservative	Kirsten Miller	837		
Labour	Patricia Eira Brown	798	40.8	+8.4
Conservative	Diana Simone Olivia Henfrey	778		
Labour	Dennis Rueben Good	707		
Labour	Terry James Mountjoy	681		
Green	Amanda Elizabeth Luffrum	314	16.1	New
Turnout			36.7	+2.7
Registered electors		5,707		
Conservative hold		Swing		
Conservative hold		Swing		
Labour gain from Conservative		Swing		

=== Warfield Harvest Ride ===
Warfield Harvest Ride (3)
Party	Candidate	Votes	%	±%
Conservative	Gareth Michael Barnard*	1,817	55.6	−14.4
Conservative	Robert Lauchlan McLean*	1,532		
Conservative	John Clifton Thompson*	1,383		
Labour	Jonathan Michael Beadsley	416	12.7	0.0
Labour	Nicola Louise Strudley	404		
Liberal Democrats	Martyn Jon Towle	358	11.0	−6.2
Independent	Sandra Kay Ingham	345	10.6	New
Green	Adrian Michael Haffegee	332	10.2	New
Labour	Alec Keene	314		
Turnout			44.0	+11.0
Registered electors		5,843		
Conservative hold		Swing		
Conservative hold		Swing		
Conservative hold		Swing		

=== Wildridings & Central ===
Wildridings & Central (2 seats)
Party	Candidate	Votes	%	±%
Conservative	Emma Catherine Duncan Barnard*	670	48.0	+0.3
Conservative	Denise Frances Whitbread*	642		
Labour	Andrew Paul Jackson	462	33.1	+9.1
Labour	James Victor Quinton	393		
Liberal Democrats	David James Maxwell	166	11.9	−9.1
Liberal Democrats	Larraine Kerry De Laune	133		
Green	Steven Martin Gabb	98	7.0	New
Turnout			39.7	+4.7
Registered electors		3,489		
Conservative hold		Swing		
Conservative hold		Swing		

=== Winkfield & Cranbourne ===
Winkfield & Cranbourne (2 seats)
Party	Candidate	Votes	%	±%
Conservative	Mary Patricia Ballin*	1,308	71.4	+20.9
Conservative	Alan Harold Kendall*	1,250		
Green	Derek Norman Wall	269	14.7	New
Labour	Carol Ann Draper	255	13.9	−1.8
Labour	Anthony Malcolm House	252		
Turnout			47.0	+9.0
Registered electors		3,945		
Conservative hold		Swing		
Conservative hold		Swing		

== By-elections ==
=== Winkfield & Cranbourne ===
Winkfield & Cranbourne By-Election 28 November 2013
Party	Candidate	Votes	%	±%
Conservative	Susie Phillips	582	52.5	−18.9
UKIP	Ken La Garde	318	28.7	New
Labour	Janet Hazel Keene	139	12.5	−1.4
Liberal Democrats	Paul Peter Birchall	69	6.2	New
Majority		264	23.8	
Turnout		1,108	27	
Registered electors		4,141		
Conservative hold		Swing		
