= 1987 Bracknell Forest Borough Council election =

1987 local election in Bracknell Forest

← 1983	7 May 1987	1991 →

All 40 seats to Bracknell Forest Borough Council 21 seats needed for a majority
	First party
	Con
Leader	Alan Ward
Party	Conservative
Leader's seat	Sandhurst
Last election	40
Seats won	40
Seat change	0
Popular vote	17,481
Percentage	54.8%
Swing	▲3.5%
Council control before election
Conservative
Council control after election
Conservative

The 1987 Bracknell Forest Borough Council election took place on 7 May 1987, to elect all 40 members in 19 wards for Bracknell Forest Borough Council in England, having been renamed from Bracknell District Council. The election was held on the same day as other local elections as part of the 1987 United Kingdom local elections. The Conservative Party repeated its feat of 1983 by winning all 40 seats. The split between the SDP–Liberal Alliance and the Labour Party continued to aid the Conservative dominance - in four wards, the Conservatives got less than 50%, but in only two was their percentage margin of victory in single digits. By seat count and percentage vote share, it remains Labour's worst performance for either Bracknell District or Bracknell Forest.

== Summary ==
1987 Bracknell Forest Borough Council election
Party	Seats	Gains	Losses	Net gain/loss	Seats %	Votes %	Votes	+/−
Conservative	40	0	0	0	100.0	54.8	17,481	+2,987
Alliance	0	0	0	0	0.0	28.2	9,002	+2,093
Labour	0	0	0	0	0.0	16.1	5,119	-1,347
Green	0	0	0	0	0.0	0.7	214	+214
Independent	0	0	0	0	0.0	0.2	75	-332

== Ward results ==
An asterisk (*) denotes an incumbent councillor standing for re-election

=== Ascot ===
Ascot (3)
Party	Candidate	Votes	%	±%
Conservative	Benwell M. Ms.*	1,582	57.5	−2.3
Conservative	Boxall M.	1,484		
Conservative	Drury D.	1,388		
Alliance	O'Doherty J.	899	32.7	+3.3
Alliance	Norman L. Ms.	858		
Alliance	Edwards J.	799		
Labour	Holloway A.	271	9.8	−1.1
Turnout			47.8	+5.1
Registered electors		5,755		
Conservative hold		Swing		
Conservative hold		Swing		
Conservative hold		Swing		

=== Binfield ===
Binfield (2)
Party	Candidate	Votes	%	±%
Conservative	Forrest J. Ms.	831	58.2	−5.2
Conservative	Taylor G.*	773		
Alliance	Crawford J. Ms.	410	28.7	+4.1
Labour	Harman J.	187	13.1	+1.0
Labour	Tarry A.	148		
Turnout			55.4	+5.9
Registered electors		2,578		
Conservative hold		Swing		
Conservative hold		Swing		

=== Bullbrook ===
Bullbrook (3)
Party	Candidate	Votes	%	±%
Conservative	Coombs M. Ms.*	1,244	52.0	+6.2
Conservative	Albrecht R.	1,186		
Conservative	Thompson E.	1,175		
Alliance	Hanson R.	696	29.1	+4.4
Alliance	Pocknee J.	633		
Alliance	Veakins D.	622		
Labour	Ryan J. Ms.	453	18.9	−10.6
Labour	Draper R.	449		
Labour	King S.	440		
Turnout			41.9	−1.6
Registered electors		5,707		
Conservative hold		Swing		
Conservative hold		Swing		
Conservative hold		Swing		

=== College Town ===
College Town (2)
Party	Candidate	Votes	%	±%
Conservative	Arnold A.*	711	52.4	+2.6
Conservative	Simonds R.*	644		
Alliance	Watts M.	517	38.1	+8.8
Alliance	Nicholson J.	444		
Labour	Plested I.	130	9.6	−11.3
Labour	Saunders J. Ms.	76		
Turnout			48.7	−5.6
Registered electors		2,788		
Conservative hold		Swing		
Conservative hold		Swing		

=== Cranbourne ===
Cranbourne
Party	Candidate	Votes	%	±%
Conservative	Ballin M. Ms.*	349	77.0	+8.8
Alliance	Glynn J.	104	23.0	New
Turnout			39.9	−3.9
Registered electors		1,134		
Conservative hold		Swing		

=== Crowthorne ===
Crowthorne (3)
Party	Candidate	Votes	%	±%
Conservative	Finnie J.*	1,065	56.9	−3.0
Conservative	Cheney A.*	1,006		
Conservative	Jarvis J.	856		
Alliance	Seaman D.	668	35.7	+5.5
Alliance	Bailey R.	649		
Alliance	Murray A.	597		
Labour	Vertigen G.	138	7.4	−2.4
Labour	Waite L. Ms.	128		
Labour	Walker D.	125		
Turnout			51.5	+2.3
Registered electors		3,631		
Conservative hold		Swing		
Conservative hold		Swing		
Conservative hold		Swing		

=== Garth ===
Garth (2)
Party	Candidate	Votes	%	±%
Conservative	Ryder J. Ms.	836	50.4	+7.8
Conservative	O'Riordan V. Ms.	815		
Labour	Wood J.	446	26.9	−5.2
Labour	Good D.	444		
Alliance	Veakins Y. Ms.	376	22.7	−2.6
Alliance	Marshall M. Ms.	365		
Turnout			52.4	+0.1
Registered electors		3,166		
Conservative hold		Swing		
Conservative hold		Swing		

=== Great Hollands North ===
Great Hollands North (2)
Party	Candidate	Votes	%	±%
Conservative	Cullip C.	735	52.7	+10.2
Conservative	Bouchard J. Ms.*	710		
Alliance	Jones F.	334	24.0	+3.9
Alliance	Davies F. Ms.	327		
Labour	Scorer A.	325	23.3	−14.2
Labour	Hutson M.	320		
Turnout			39.7	−5.0
Registered electors		3,512		
Conservative hold		Swing		
Conservative hold		Swing		

=== Great Hollands South ===
Great Hollands South (2)
Party	Candidate	Votes	%	±%
Conservative	Angell R.*	1,016	63.0	+8.8
Conservative	McCracken I.*	964		
Alliance	Macmahon T.	344	21.3	−1.4
Alliance	Le Patourel G.	338		
Labour	Shillock J. Ms.	252	15.6	−7.5
Labour	Vickers C.	243		
Turnout			43.7	−2.8
Registered electors		3,690		
Conservative hold		Swing		
Conservative hold		Swing		

=== Hanworth ===
Hanworth (3)
Party	Candidate	Votes	%	±%
Conservative	Byrne P.	1,465	49.7	+0.8
Conservative	Wallace M.*	1,433		
Conservative	Ince J.	1,414		
Alliance	Campbell-Grant I.	653	22.2	+1.9
Alliance	Keeley A.	624		
Labour	Grayson H.	614	20.8	−10.0
Labour	Wilson D.	585		
Alliance	Whitney B.	579		
Labour	Toussaint-Jackson J.	515		
Green	Lawrence L.	214	7.3	New
Turnout			48.1	+0.2
Registered electors		6,123		
Conservative hold		Swing		
Conservative hold		Swing		
Conservative hold		Swing		

=== Harmanswater ===
Harmanswater (3)
Party	Candidate	Votes	%	±%
Conservative	Ainscough T.*	1,584	53.0	+3.8
Conservative	Mills T.*	1,557		
Conservative	Egan J.	1,495		
Alliance	Bristow T.	801	26.8	+5.2
Alliance	Smith G.	796		
Alliance	Thompson M. Ms.	725		
Labour	Stewart R.	602	20.2	−9.0
Labour	Porter M.	548		
Labour	Holness W.	531		
Turnout			46.6	+2.4
Registered electors		6,407		
Conservative hold		Swing		
Conservative hold		Swing		
Conservative hold		Swing		

=== Little Sandhurst ===
Little Sandhurst (2)
Party	Candidate	Votes	%	±%
Conservative	Birch D.	886	54.4	−3.7
Conservative	Cohen H.*	839		
Alliance	Washington S. Ms.	550	33.7	+6.3
Alliance	Mohammed N.	362		
Labour	Urquhart C.	194	11.9	−2.6
Labour	Collett J. Ms.	180		
Turnout			57.1	+10.7
Registered electors		2,853		
Conservative hold		Swing		
Conservative hold		Swing		

=== Old Bracknell ===
Old Bracknell (3)
Party	Candidate	Votes	%	±%
Conservative	Dunn E. Ms.	903	47.7	+3.2
Conservative	Fox T.*	894		
Conservative	Mattick I. Ms.	865		
Alliance	Maxwell D.	549	29.0	+5.8
Alliance	Pickersgill E.	532		
Alliance	Cole L.	521		
Labour	Ryan T.	442	23.3	−9.1
Labour	Pearce T.	437		
Labour	Winter A.	419		
Turnout			42.9	+4.9
Registered electors		4,411		
Conservative hold		Swing		
Conservative hold		Swing		
Conservative hold		Swing		

=== Owlsmoor ===
Owlsmoor
Party	Candidate	Votes	%	±%
Conservative	Thomas R.*	1,051	58.7	+7.0
Alliance	Earwicker R.	658	36.8	−3.6
Labour	Saunders M.	81	4.5	−3.4
Turnout			45.7	−12.4
Registered electors		3,914		
Conservative hold		Swing		

=== Priestwood ===
Priestwood (2)
Party	Candidate	Votes	%	±%
Conservative	Blake L.	706	42.7	+6.5
Conservative	Hall M.	664		
Labour	Clifford J. Ms.	602	36.4	+2.1
Labour	Tomkins J.	507		
Alliance	Mountjoy T.	347	21.0	−8.5
Alliance	Lawlor K.	322		
Turnout			52.6	+8.8
Registered electors		3,147		
Conservative hold		Swing		
Conservative hold		Swing		

=== Sandhurst ===
Sandhurst (2)
Party	Candidate	Votes	%	±%
Conservative	Marsden J.	916	63.0	+14.5
Conservative	Ward A.*	879		
Alliance	Gabriel E.	329	22.6	0.0
Alliance	Edwards R.	319		
Labour	Goddard R.	133	9.2	+1.8
Labour	Grice J. Ms.	119		
Independent	Brookes C.	75	5.2	New
Turnout			48.3	+5.1
Registered electors		3,010		
Conservative hold		Swing		
Conservative hold		Swing		

=== St. Marys ===
St. Marys
Party	Candidate	Votes	%	±%
Conservative	Warren J.*	521	77.3	−8.6
Alliance	Virgo A.	153	22.7	New
Turnout			58.8	+12.4
Registered electors		1,146		
Conservative hold		Swing		

=== Warfield ===
Warfield
Party	Candidate	Votes	%	±%
Conservative	Kay J. Ms.*	518	77.0	+7.7
Alliance	Lees N.	110	16.3	−1.2
Labour	Wass S. Ms.	45	6.7	−6.5
Turnout			45.6	−0.8
Registered electors		1,476		
Conservative hold		Swing		

=== Wildridings ===
Wildridings (2)
Party	Candidate	Votes	%	±%
Conservative	Wreglesworth N.*	562	44.3	−4.0
Conservative	Mattick J.*	559		
Alliance	Cole C. Ms.	504	39.7	+12.3
Alliance	Adams W.	435		
Labour	Farley A.	204	16.1	−8.2
Labour	Dossett P.	197		
Turnout			54.3	+1.3
Registered electors		2,337		
Conservative hold		Swing		
Conservative hold		Swing		
