= 2019 Bracknell Forest Borough Council election =

2019 local election in Bracknell Forest

- 2 May 2019

All 42 seats to Bracknell Forest Borough Council 22 seats needed for a majority
- Turnout: 30% (▼37pp)
	First party	Second party	Third party
	Con	Lab	LD
Leader	Paul Bettison	Mary Temperton	N/A
Party	Conservative	Labour	Liberal Democrats
Leader's seat	Little Sandhurst & Wellington	Great Hollands North	N/A
Last election	41 seats, 52.0%	1 seat, 22.2%	0 seat, 6.7%
Seats won	38	3	1
Seat change	▼3	▲2	▲1
Popular vote	14,183	7,790	5,956
Percentage	48.5%	26.7%	20.4%
Swing	▼3.5%	▲4.5%	▲13.7%
- Results of the 2019 Bracknell Forest Borough Council election
Council control before election
Conservative
Council control after election
Conservative

The 2019 Bracknell Forest Borough Council election took place on 2 May 2019 to elect all 42 councillors in 18 wards for Bracknell Forest Borough Council in England.

The Conservative Party has controlled the council since its establishment as a unitary authority in 1998, and ended up securing a seventh term in office.

== Background ==
Bracknell Forest Borough Council held local elections on 2 May 2019 along with councils across England as part of the 2019 local elections. The council elects its members in all-out elections, with all its councillors up for election every four years. Councillors defending their seats in this election were previously elected in 2015. In that election, forty-one Conservative councillors and one Labour councillor were elected.

The council has been controlled by the Conservative Party since the unitary authority was first elected in 1997. The predecessor district council had been controlled by both the Labour and Conservative parties.

== Overall results ==
After the previous election, and immediately before this election, the composition of the council was:

↓
41	1
Conservative	Labour

The Conservatives held the council losing just three seats with two going to Labour and one to the Liberal Democrats.

Following the 2019 election, the composition of the council was:

↓
38	3	1
Conservative	Labour	Liberal Democrats

== Ward results ==
An asterisk (*) denotes an incumbent councillor standing for re-election

=== Ascot ===
Ascot (2 seats)
Party	Candidate	Votes	%	±%
Conservative	Dorothy Andrea Susan Hayes*	756	64.1	−5.0
Conservative	Nigel John Atkinson	708	60.0	
Liberal Democrats	Simon Christopher Banks	291	24.7	+12.6
Labour	Katherine Giles	246	20.8	+5.1
Labour	Stephen Geoffrey Young	171	14.5	
Turnout		1,180	29	−42
Registered electors		4,113		
Rejected ballots		19	1.6	
Conservative hold		Swing		
Conservative hold		Swing		

=== Binfield with Warfield ===
Binfield with Warfield (3 seats)
Party	Candidate	Votes	%	±%
Conservative	Ian Leake*	1,341	61.7	−1.8
Conservative	John Harrison*	1,337	61.6	
Conservative	Ankur Shiv Bhandari	1,125	51.8	
Liberal Democrats	Richard Stewart Francis	611	28.1	New
Labour	Lorraine Marie Copley	499	23.0	+1.0
Labour	Eric William Pilmoor	403	18.6	
Labour	Andrew James Walker	360	16.6	
Turnout		2,172	29	−41
Registered electors		7,709		
Rejected ballots		42	1.9	
Conservative hold		Swing		
Conservative hold		Swing		
Conservative hold		Swing		

=== Bullbrook ===
Bullbrook (2 seats)
Party	Candidate	Votes	%	±%
Conservative	Robert Angell*	651	52.8	−5.0
Conservative	Ian Jeffrey Kirke	619	50.2	
Labour	Lara Claire Patricia Johnson	441	35.7	+2.4
Labour	David Michael Hugh McMullen	357	28.9	
Liberal Democrats	Kim Lyons	230	18.6	+2.6
Turnout		1,234	27	−36
Registered electors		4,698		
Rejected ballots		30	2.4	
Conservative hold		Swing		
Conservative hold		Swing		

=== Central Sandhurst ===
Central Sandhurst (2 seats)
Party	Candidate	Votes	%	±%
Conservative	Michael Richard Brossard*	565	48.0	−18.6
Conservative	Gaby Kennedy	542	46.0	
Liberal Democrats	Michael Paul Forster	422	35.9	+16.4
Liberal Democrats	Leigh Quigg	309	26.3	
Green	Rosie Chandler	162	13.8	New
Labour	Garrett Sidney Cooke	125	10.6	−10.5
Labour	Leo Eli Orlando Anniballi	122	10.4	
Turnout		1,177	31	−38
Registered electors		3,903		
Rejected ballots		25	2.1	
Conservative hold		Swing		
Conservative hold		Swing		

=== College Town ===
College Town (2 seats)
Party	Candidate	Votes	%	±%
Conservative	Pauline Ann McKenzie*	632	64.5	−8.9
Conservative	Nicholas Mark Allen*	617	63.0	
Liberal Democrats	Philip Geoffrey Thompson	250	25.5	+9.9
Labour	Clive Urquhart	213	21.7	−1.0
Labour	Matthew Edward White	135	13.8	
Turnout		980	26	−40
Registered electors		3,860		
Rejected ballots		21	2.1	
Conservative hold		Swing		
Conservative hold		Swing		

=== Crown Wood ===
Crown Wood (3 seats)
Party	Candidate	Votes	%	±%
Conservative	Marc Brunel-Walker*	809	50.6	−1.6
Conservative	Colin Reginald Dudley*	778	48.6	
Conservative	Suki Alanna Hayes*	756	47.2	
Labour	Danielle Turner	625	39.1	+9.9
Labour	Christopher Peter John Foxon	560	35.0	
Labour	Guy Alexander Gillbe	459	28.7	
Liberal Democrats	Stephen Richard Clay	276	17.2	New
Turnout		1,600	28	−35
Registered electors		5,911		
Rejected ballots		27	1.7	
Conservative hold		Swing		
Conservative hold		Swing		
Conservative hold		Swing		

=== Crowthorne ===
Crowthorne (2 seats)
Party	Candidate	Votes	%	±%
Conservative	Bob Wade*	713	54.9	−9.0
Conservative	Tina McKenzie-Boyle	711	54.7	
Liberal Democrats	Stephen Pope	374	28.8	+6.8
Liberal Democrats	Christopher Robin Sexton	289	22.2	
Labour	Kate Cameron-Daum	216	16.6	+2.6
Labour	Jonathon Monger	198	15.2	
Turnout		1,299	32	−40
Registered electors		4,114		
Rejected ballots		18	1.4	
Conservative hold		Swing		
Conservative hold		Swing		

=== Great Hollands North ===
Great Hollands North (2 seats)
Party	Candidate	Votes	%	±%
Labour	Mary Louise Temperton*	1,374	74.7	+16.2
Labour	Kathryn Claire Neil	1,044	56.8	
Conservative	Peter Stephen Hill*	540	29.4	−10.9
Conservative	Max Mir	346	18.8	
Liberal Democrats	Ben Ian Jeffrey Hutchinson	163	8.9	New
Turnout		1,839	34	−31
Registered electors		5,502		
Rejected ballots		23	1.2	
Labour hold		Swing		
Labour gain from Conservative		Swing		

=== Great Hollands South ===
Great Hollands South (2 seats)
Party	Candidate	Votes	%	±%
Conservative	Michael Gbadebo	567	45.7	+2.6
Conservative	Lizzy Gibson	528	42.6	
Labour	Kathleen Mary Nugent	451	36.4	+3.0
Labour	Naheed Ejaz	362	29.2	
Green	Derek Gregory Clifford Florey	261	21.0	+7.8
Liberal Democrats	Daniel Biddle	159	12.8	+2.8
Turnout		1,240	34	−33
Registered electors		3,767		
Rejected ballots		28	2.2	
Conservative hold		Swing		
Conservative hold		Swing		

=== Hanworth ===
Hanworth (3 seats)
Party	Candidate	Votes	%	±%
Conservative	Gill Birch*	1,028	56.8	+13.0
Conservative	Mike Gibson	950	52.5	
Conservative	Michael John Skinner	897	49.6	
Labour	Nicola Jayne Goddard	577	31.9	+9.3
Labour	Jenny Penfold	572	31.6	
Labour	Shawn Nathan Roy Hearn	548	30.3	
Liberal Democrats	Terence George Enga	424	23.4	+12.4
Turnout		1,810	30	−35
Registered electors		6,116		
Rejected ballots		33	1.8	
Conservative hold		Swing		
Conservative hold		Swing		
Conservative hold		Swing		

=== Harmans Water ===
Harmans Water (3 seats)
Party	Candidate	Votes	%	±%
Conservative	Christopher Richard Martin Turrell*	1,039	49.9	−5.6
Conservative	Isabel Margaret Mattick*	1,013	48.6	
Conservative	Ashley Caroline Merry*	1,005	48.2	
Labour	Thomas Faraday Neill	560	26.9	+2.9
Labour	Diane Cheryl Thomas	506	24.3	
Labour	John Kenneth Wright	448	21.5	
UKIP	Shelagh Rosemary Pile	434	20.8	−4.7
Liberal Democrats	Patrick Robert Smith	424	20.3	New
Turnout		2,084	32	−33
Registered electors		6,650		
Rejected ballots		18	0.9	
Conservative hold		Swing		
Conservative hold		Swing		
Conservative hold		Swing		

=== Little Sandhurst and Wellington ===
Little Sandhurst and Wellington (2 seats)
Party	Candidate	Votes	%	±%
Conservative	Dale Philip Birch*	744	56.8	+2.6
Conservative	Paul David Bettison*	741	56.5	
Liberal Democrats	Rebecca Jayne Duffett	393	30.0	+9.7
Labour	Megan Ruth Wright	275	21.0	+3.4
Labour	Nicola Jane Mansfield	248	18.9	
Turnout		1,311	33	−38
Registered electors		4,064		
Rejected ballots		34	2.5	
Conservative hold		Swing		
Conservative hold		Swing		

=== Old Bracknell ===
Old Bracknell (2 seats)
Party	Candidate	Votes	%	±%
Conservative	Peter Heydon*	626	51.1	+1.3
Conservative	Malcolm Ian Tullett	569	46.5	
Labour	Susan Helen Cahill	493	40.3	+5.7
Labour	Roy John Bailey	485	39.6	
Liberal Democrats	David James Maxwell	180	14.7	New
Turnout		1,224	29	−33
Registered electors		4,320		
Rejected ballots		20	1.6	
Conservative hold		Swing		
Conservative hold		Swing		

=== Owlsmoor ===
Owlsmoor (2 seats)
Party	Candidate	Votes	%	±%
Conservative	John Porter*	631	59.8	+3.6
Conservative	Ray Mossom	604	57.3	
Labour	Diane Elizabeth Allum-Wilson	276	26.2	+11.3
Liberal Democrats	Mark David Vandersluis	256	24.3	+4.9
Labour	Clive Temperton	128	12.1	
Turnout		1,055	28	−42
Registered electors		3,903		
Rejected ballots		33	3.0	
Conservative hold		Swing		
Conservative hold		Swing		

=== Priestwood and Garth ===
Priestwood and Garth (3 seats)
Party	Candidate	Votes	%	±%
Conservative	Alvin Edwin Finch*	693	42.2	−8.9
Conservative	Jennie Green	676	41.2	
Labour	Tricia Brown	595	36.2	+1.2
Labour	Paul Steven Bidwell	593	36.1	
Conservative	Graham Edward Birch*	579	35.3	
Labour	Steve Fearon	506	30.8	
UKIP	Dave Colley	315	19.2	−7.9
Liberal Democrats	Darren Antony Bridgman	294	17.9	New
Turnout		1,642	29	−32
Registered electors		5,785		
Rejected ballots		7	0.4	
Conservative hold		Swing		
Conservative hold		Swing		
Labour gain from Conservative		Swing		

=== Warfield Harvest Ride ===
Warfield Harvest Ride (3 seats)
Party	Candidate	Votes	%	±%
Conservative	Gareth Michael Barnard*	1,274	66.6	+3.8
Conservative	Sandra Kay Ingham	1,273	66.6	
Conservative	Robert Lauchlan McLean*	1,128	59.0	
Liberal Democrats	Nigel Malcolm Bradly	494	25.8	New
Labour	Libbi Rae Miller	355	18.6	+4.5
Labour	Anne Shillcock	312	16.3	
Labour	Graham William Firth	256	13.4	
Turnout		1,912	32	−40
Registered electors		6,086		
Rejected ballots		29	1.5	
Conservative hold		Swing		
Conservative hold		Swing		
Conservative hold		Swing		

=== Wildridings & Central ===
Wildridings & Central (2 seats)
Party	Candidate	Votes	%	±%
Conservative	Dee Hamilton*	474	38.6	−12.0
Liberal Democrats	Thomas James Parker	466	37.9	+22.4
Conservative	Kirsten Ashman	399	32.5	
Liberal Democrats	James Bailey Davis Dunsmuir	366	29.8	
Labour	Peter Charles Frewer	263	21.4	−10.4
Labour	Michael Karim	245	19.9	
Green	Maciej Pawlik	127	10.3	New
Turnout		1,229	31	−33
Registered electors		4,000		
Rejected ballots		15	1.2	
Conservative hold		Swing		
Liberal Democrats gain from Conservative		Swing		

=== Winkfield & Cranbourne ===
Winkfield & Cranbourne (2 seats)
Party	Candidate	Votes	%	±%
Conservative	Moira Kathleen Gaw*	1,100	76.9	+11.4
Conservative	Tony Virgo	945	66.1	
Liberal Democrats	Christopher David Jenkins	249	17.4	New
Labour	Bob Miller	206	14.4	+4.0
Labour	Alan Harold Round	163	11.4	
Turnout		1,430	36	−37
Registered electors		4,087		
Rejected ballots		28	1.9	
Conservative hold		Swing		
Conservative hold		Swing		

== Changes 2019–2023 ==
=== By-elections ===
==== Old Bracknell ====
The by-election was triggered by the resignation of Conservative councillor Malcolm Tullett, who left the party's group on the council in July 2021 after a dispute over his membership at Bracknell Town Council.

Old Bracknell By-Election 9 December 2021
Party	Candidate	Votes	%	±%
Labour	Paul Steven Bidwell	434	61.1	+23.2
Conservative	Iain Alexander McCracken	276	38.9	−9.3
Majority		158	22.2	
Turnout		710	17	−12
Registered electors		4,178		
Rejected ballots		1	0.1	
Labour gain from Conservative		Swing	16.3	
