= 1983 Bracknell District Council election =

1983 local election in Bracknell Forest

← 1979	5 May 1983	1987 →

All 40 seats to Bracknell District Council 21 seats needed for a majority
	First party	Second party
	Con	All
Leader	David Tubbs (outgoing)	N/A
Party	Conservative	Alliance
Leader's seat	Great Hollands South	N/A
Last election	27	0
Seats won	40	0
Seat change	▲13	0
Popular vote	14,494	6,909
Percentage	51.3%	24.4%
Swing	▲1.9%	▲14.5%
	Third party	Fourth party
	Lab	Ind
Leader	Denis Tunnicliffe
Party	Labour	Independent
Leader's seat	Ran in Hanworth (lost)
Last election	10	3
Seats won	0	0
Seat change	▼10	▼3
Popular vote	6,466	407
Percentage	22.9%	1.4%
Swing	▼15.5%	▼0.9%
Council control before election
Conservative
Council control after election
Conservative

The 1983 Bracknell District Council election took place on 5 May 1983, to elect all 40 members in 19 wards for Bracknell Forest Borough Council in England. The election was held on the same day as other local elections as part of the 1983 United Kingdom local elections. The Conservative Party won a third term in office, securing an electoral wipeout of the opposition parties by winning all 40 seats, a feat it would repeat in 1987.

The local Labour Party was riven by internal disputes, cultivated since the last election by the national split and the creation of the Social Democratic Party. In late 1981, Labour group leader Jack Delbridge and other Labour local luminaries, including former council leader Bill Lindop, defected to the SDP, claiming left-wing militants controlled the local Labour party and the relationship was untenable. Of the 10 Labour councillors elected in 1979, 6 would stand for election under the SDP–Liberal Alliance banner, 3 would not stand for re-election, while only Denis Tunnicliffe stood again, leading the rump Labour group - symbolic of the split was his wife standing for the Alliance in Great Hollands South.

== Summary ==
Votes for the SDP–Liberal Alliance are compared against the Liberal Party in 1979.

1983 Bracknell District Council election
Party	Seats	Gains	Losses	Net gain/loss	Seats %	Votes %	Votes	+/−
Conservative	40	▲13	0	▲13	100.0	51.3	14,494	
Alliance	0	0	0	0	0.0	24.4	6,909	
Labour	0	0	▼10	▼10	0.0	22.9	6,466	
Independent	0	0	▼3	▼3	0.0	1.4	407	

== Ward results ==
An asterisk (*) denotes an incumbent councillor standing for re-election.

Votes for the SDP–Liberal Alliance are compared against the Liberal Party in 1979.

=== Ascot ===
Ascot (3)
Party	Candidate	Votes	%	±%
Conservative	Benwell D.*	1,034	59.8	−40.2
Conservative	Dauncey M.	938		
Conservative	Jackson R.*	936		
Alliance	Glynn J.	508	29.4	New
Alliance	Harrison R.	419		
Alliance	Rennie-Fielding J. Ms.	419		
Labour	Porter M.	188	10.9	New
Labour	Williams R.	184		
Labour	Bayle M. Ms.	176		
Turnout			42.7	N/A
Registered electors		4,050		
Conservative hold		Swing		
Conservative hold		Swing		
Conservative gain from Independent		Swing		

=== Binfield ===
Binfield (2)
Party	Candidate	Votes	%	±%
Conservative	Edwards J. Ms.	705	63.4	+12.1
Conservative	Taylor G.	663		
Alliance	Biddlecombe M.	273	24.6	−5.0
Alliance	Sabberton R.	187		
Labour	Harman J.	134	12.1	−7.1
Labour	Glasson E.	127		
Turnout			49.5	−33.7
Registered electors		2,246		
Conservative hold		Swing		
Conservative hold		Swing		

=== Bullbrook ===
Bullbrook (3)
Party	Candidate	Votes	%	±%
Conservative	Coombs M. Ms.*	1,086	45.8	−10.1
Conservative	Blake L.	1,051		
Conservative	Strong P. Ms.*	1,037		
Labour	Cook H.	700	29.5	−14.6
Labour	Newbury J.	621		
Alliance	Hanson R.	585	24.7	New
Alliance	Moignard M. Ms.	582		
Labour	Wilson D.	581		
Alliance	Lees N.	550		
Turnout			43.5	−26.3
Registered electors		5,445		
Conservative hold		Swing		
Conservative hold		Swing		
Conservative hold		Swing		

=== College Town ===
College Town (2)
Party	Candidate	Votes	%	±%
Conservative	Arnold A.	587	49.8	+8.5
Conservative	Simonds R.	506		
Alliance	Routledge M.	345	29.3	New
Alliance	Watts M.	341		
Labour	Wood R.	247	20.9	+1.2
Labour	Urquhart C.	175		
Turnout			54.3	
Registered electors		2,172		
Conservative hold		Swing		
Conservative gain from Independent		Swing		

=== Cranbourne ===
Cranbourne
Party	Candidate	Votes	%	±%
Conservative	Ballin M. Ms.	334	68.2	New
Independent	Smart R.	112	22.9	New
Labour	Foord M.	44	9.0	New
Turnout			43.8	N/A
Registered electors		1,118		
Conservative gain from Independent		Swing		

=== Crowthorne ===
Crowthorne (3)
Party	Candidate	Votes	%	±%
Conservative	Finnie J.*	1,060	59.9	−8.3
Conservative	Cheney A.*	916		
Conservative	Richardson R.	913		
Alliance	Seaman D.	535	30.2	New
Alliance	Lancashire A.	520		
Alliance	Murray A.	486		
Labour	Vertigen G.	174	9.8	−22.0
Labour	King S.	167		
Labour	Wheaton T.	149		
Turnout			49.2	−6.1
Registered electors		3,595		
Conservative hold		Swing		
Conservative hold		Swing		
Conservative hold		Swing		

=== Garth ===
Garth (2)
Party	Candidate	Votes	%	±%
Conservative	Aspey F.	680	42.6	−3.5
Conservative	Sturman C.	606		
Labour	Palmer J. Ms.	512	32.1	−21.8
Labour	Loneragan D.	450		
Alliance	Lindop W.	403	25.3	New
Alliance	Pocknee J.	381		
Turnout			52.3	−22.8
Registered electors		3,052		
Conservative gain from Labour		Swing		
Conservative gain from Labour		Swing		

=== Great Hollands North ===
Great Hollands North (2)
Party	Candidate	Votes	%	±%
Conservative	Bouchard J. Ms.	635	42.5	+9.7
Conservative	Cumming C.	617		
Labour	Chapman P. Ms.	560	37.5	−7.6
Labour	Lomax V. Ms.	491		
Alliance	Campbell-Grant I.	300	20.1	−2.0
Alliance	Jones E. Ms.	293		
Turnout			44.7	−34.3
Registered electors		3,346		
Conservative gain from Labour		Swing		
Conservative gain from Labour		Swing		

=== Great Hollands South ===
Great Hollands South (2)
Party	Candidate	Votes	%	±%
Conservative	McCracken I.	727	54.2	+6.1
Conservative	Angell R.	719		
Labour	Jamison N.	310	23.1	−9.9
Alliance	Biggs K. Ms.	305	22.7	+3.8
Labour	Sanderson B.	303		
Alliance	Tunnicliffe S. Ms.	296		
Turnout			46.5	−29.9
Registered electors		2,884		
Conservative hold		Swing		
Conservative hold		Swing		

=== Hanworth ===
Hanworth (3)
Party	Candidate	Votes	%	±%
Conservative	Elford D.*	1,416	48.9	+6.5
Conservative	Percy R.	1,401		
Conservative	Wallace M.	1,338		
Labour	Grayson H.	893	30.8	−5.6
Labour	Tunnicliffe D.	834		
Labour	Ozanne P.	797		
Alliance	Balfour A.	587	20.3	−0.9
Alliance	Gee L.	561		
Alliance	Miles M.	556		
Turnout			47.9	−29.8
Registered electors		6,049		
Conservative hold		Swing		
Conservative hold		Swing		
Conservative hold		Swing		

=== Harmanswater ===
Harmanswater (3)
Party	Candidate	Votes	%	±%
Conservative	Ainscough T.*	1,308	49.2	−1.9
Conservative	Mills T.	1,285		
Conservative	Teesdale G. Ms.	1,257		
Labour	Munn M. Ms.	778	29.2	−2.4
Labour	Scorer A.	749		
Labour	Williams A. Ms.	742		
Alliance	Hughes W.	575	21.6	+4.3
Alliance	White P.	537		
Alliance	Spencer J.	530		
Turnout			44.2	−33.6
Registered electors		6,014		
Conservative hold		Swing		
Conservative hold		Swing		
Conservative hold		Swing		

=== Little Sandhurst ===
Little Sandhurst (2)
Party	Candidate	Votes	%	±%
Conservative	Cohen H.*	779	58.1	−11.1
Conservative	Marsden J.	775		
Alliance	Lyne H.	368	27.4	New
Alliance	Hewitt H.	315		
Labour	Wood J. Ms.	194	14.5	−16.3
Labour	Goddard R.	190		
Turnout			46.4	−30.5
Registered electors		2,890		
Conservative hold		Swing		
Conservative hold		Swing		

=== Old Bracknell ===
Old Bracknell (3)
Party	Candidate	Votes	%	±%
Conservative	Fox P.	842	44.5	+11.0
Conservative	Cavill D.	841		
Conservative	Egan J.	819		
Labour	Newbury C.	613	32.4	−12.3
Labour	Ryan V. Ms.	608		
Labour	Warwick S. Ms.	586		
Alliance	Maxwell D.	439	23.2	+1.4
Alliance	McCartan H.	388		
Alliance	Carson C.	378		
Turnout			38.0	−40.0
Registered electors		4,981		
Conservative gain from Labour		Swing		
Conservative gain from Labour		Swing		
Conservative gain from Labour		Swing		

=== Owlsmoor ===
Owlsmoor
Party	Candidate	Votes	%	±%
Conservative	Thomas R.	674	51.7	−48.3
Alliance	Nicholson J.	527	40.4	New
Labour	Draper R.	103	7.9	New
Turnout			58.1	
Registered electors		2,246		
Conservative hold		Swing		

=== Priestwood ===
Priestwood (2)
Party	Candidate	Votes	%	±%
Conservative	Furniss A.	483	36.2	−3.4
Conservative	Shean J.	461		
Labour	Drukker M.	457	34.3	−26.1
Labour	Tarry A.	421		
Alliance	Mountjoy T.* (Note: Cain and Mountjoy were elected as Labour Party candidates in 1979.)	394	29.5	New
Alliance	Cain F.*	376		
Turnout			43.8	−31.3
Registered electors		3,046		
Conservative gain from Labour		Swing		
Conservative gain from Labour		Swing		

=== Sandhurst ===
Sandhurst (2)
Party	Candidate	Votes	%	±%
Conservative	Ward A.	665	48.5	−12.1
Conservative	Brookes C.*	600		
Alliance	Murray L. Ms.	310	22.6	New
Independent	Allum G.	295	21.5	New
Alliance	Duerden M.	258		
Labour	Crew R.	101	7.4	−32.0
Labour	Brierley A.	95		
Turnout			53.4	−24.4
Registered electors		2,567		
Conservative hold		Swing		
Conservative hold		Swing		

=== St. Marys ===
St. Marys
Party	Candidate	Votes	%	±%
Conservative	Warren J.*	426	85.9	−14.1
Labour	Wheaton A. Ms.	70	14.1	New
Turnout			46.4	N/A
Registered electors		1,068		
Conservative hold		Swing		

=== Warfield ===
Warfield
Party	Candidate	Votes	%	±%
Conservative	Kay J. Ms.*	455	69.3	−3.8
Alliance	Thompson I.	115	17.5	New
Labour	Murnane J.	87	13.2	−13.7
Turnout			46.4	−23.6
Registered electors		1,415		
Conservative hold		Swing		

=== Wildridings ===
Wildridings (2)
Party	Candidate	Votes	%	±%
Conservative	Mattick J.*	598	48.3	−2.6
Conservative	Wreglesworth N.	548		
Alliance	Mullarky P.	340	27.4	New
Alliance	Cole C. Ms.	328		
Labour	Hignell W.	301	24.3	−24.8
Labour	Onyewu A.	258		
Turnout			53.0	−23.4
Registered electors		2,338		
Conservative hold		Swing		
Conservative gain from Labour		Swing		
