= 2007 Bracknell Forest Borough Council election =

2007 local election in Bracknell Forest

← 2003	3 May 2007	2011 →

All 42 seats to Bracknell Forest Borough Council 22 seats needed for a majority
- Turnout: 34% (▲3pp)
	First party	Second party	Third party
	Con	Lab	LD
Leader	Paul Bettison	Anne Shillcock	Ray Earwicker
Party	Conservative	Labour	Liberal Democrats
Leader's seat	Little Sandhurst & Wellington	Great Hollands North	College Town (lost re-election)
Last election	35 seats, 50.1%	6 seats, 28.6%	1 seats, 15.2%
Seats won	39	3	0
Seat change	▲4	▼3	▼1
Popular vote	17,008	6,451	2,745
Percentage	55.8%	21.2%	9.0%
Swing	▲5.7%	▼7.4%	▼6.2%
- Results of the 2007 Bracknell Forest Borough Council election
Council control before election
Conservative
Council control after election
Conservative

The 2007 Bracknell Forest Borough Council election took place on 3 May 2007, to elect all 42 councillors in 18 wards for Bracknell Forest Borough Council in England. The election was held on the same day as other local elections in England as part of the 2007 United Kingdom local elections. The Conservative Party increased its majority at the expense of both the Labour Party and the Liberal Democrats, the latter losing its only seat. This was the only all-out council election where the far-right British National Party put up a candidate.

== Ward results ==
An asterisk (*) denotes an incumbent councillor standing for re-election

=== Ascot ===
Ascot (2)
Party	Candidate	Votes	%	±%
Conservative	Dorothy Andrea Susan Hayes*	995	71.5	+14.5
Conservative	Tony Virgo	881		
Liberal Democrats	Jonathan Peter Cross	233	16.7	+1.7
Liberal Democrats	Ian Richard Campbell-Grant	226		
Labour	Joanna Beadsley	164	11.8	−4.5
Turnout			33.0	+3.6
Registered electors		4,095		
Conservative hold		Swing		
Conservative hold		Swing		

=== Binfield with Warfield ===
Binfield with Warfield (3)
Party	Candidate	Votes	%	±%
Conservative	John Bruce Harrison*	1,385	48.1	+9.0
Conservative	Ian William Leake*	1,265		
Conservative	Brenda Dorothy Wilson	1,204		
Liberal Democrats	Michael John Hawkins	569	19.8	−3.0
Labour	David Fawcett	361	12.5	−6.7
Independent	Hilary Doyle	334	11.6	−7.3
Labour	Tim Hanson	313		
UKIP	Jeffrey Alan Newbold	228	7.9	New
Labour	Allan Scorer	143		
Turnout			35.0	+0.6
Registered electors		6,109		
Conservative hold		Swing		
Conservative hold		Swing		
Conservative hold		Swing		

=== Bullbrook ===
Bullbrook (2)
Party	Candidate	Votes	%	±%
Conservative	Anne Fleming	831	57.0	+3.6
Conservative	Iain Alexander McCracken*	800		
Labour	Graham William Firth	286	19.6	−9.9
Labour	Bob Draper	270		
Liberal Democrats	William George Harris	244	16.7	−0.5
Liberal Democrats	Ronald Henry Hanson	228		
Independent	Andrew Street	98	6.7	New
Turnout			36.0	0.0
Registered electors		4,063		
Conservative hold		Swing		
Conservative hold		Swing		

=== Central Sandhurst ===
Central Sandhurst (2)
Party	Candidate	Votes	%	±%
Conservative	Michael Richard Brossard	862	52.9	+14.0
Conservative	Alan Frederick Ward*	839		
Green	Teresa Marie Burchnall-Wood	340	20.8	+9.9
Labour	Ann Miller	260	15.9	−0.7
UKIP	Stephen Robert Deakin	169	10.4	−1.3
Turnout			34.0	+4.3
Registered electors		3,959		
Conservative hold		Swing		
Conservative hold		Swing		

=== College Town ===
College Town (2)
Party	Candidate	Votes	%	±%
Conservative	Robert Cecil Edger*	783	54.0	+2.6
Conservative	Andy Blatchford	783		
Liberal Democrats	Ray Earwicker*	422	29.1	−19.5
Liberal Democrats	Peter Hodge	340		
UKIP	Mike King	150	10.3	New
Labour	Ian Plested	95	6.6	New
Turnout			33.0	+3.7
Registered electors		4,216		
Conservative hold		Swing		
Conservative gain from Liberal Democrats		Swing		

=== Crown Wood ===
Crown Wood (3)
Party	Candidate	Votes	%	±%
Conservative	Colin Reginald Dudley*	1,140	50.3	+2.9
Conservative	Marc Brunel-Walker*	1,123		
Conservative	Robert Charles Osborne*	1,001		
UKIP	Malcolm Edward White	585	25.8	New
Labour	Wilf Holness	543	23.9	−16.1
Labour	Roy Bailey	502		
Labour	John Wright	127		
Turnout			29.0	+3.6
Registered electors		5,959		
Conservative hold		Swing		
Conservative hold		Swing		
Conservative hold		Swing		

=== Crowthorne ===
Crowthorne (2)
Party	Candidate	Votes	%	±%
Conservative	James George Finnie*	941	76.3	+22.7
Conservative	Bob Wade*	843		
Labour	Phil Keene	293	23.7	+4.8
Turnout			32.0	−2.3
Registered electors		3,940		
Conservative hold		Swing		
Conservative hold		Swing		

=== Great Hollands North ===
Great Hollands North (2)
Party	Candidate	Votes	%	±%
Labour	Anne Shillcock*	443	44.3	−22.3
Conservative	Scott Andrew Burrows	416	41.6	+8.2
Labour	John Piasecki	406		
Conservative	Graham Ellis	404		
Liberal Democrats	Andrew Joseph Kurowski	141	14.1	New
Liberal Democrats	Larraine Kerry De Laune	133		
Turnout			34.0	+7.8
Registered electors		3,097		
Conservative hold		Swing		
Conservative gain from Labour		Swing		

=== Great Hollands South ===
Great Hollands South (2)
Party	Candidate	Votes	%	±%
Conservative	Jan Angell	693	46.0	−3.4
Conservative	Jennie McCracken	666		
Labour	Mary Temperton	626	41.5	−9.1
Labour	Mike Adams	569		
UKIP	Irene June Newbold	189	12.5	New
Turnout			39.0	+7.1
Registered electors		3,881		
Conservative gain from Labour		Swing		
Conservative gain from Labour		Swing		

=== Hanworth ===
Hanworth (3)
Party	Candidate	Votes	%	±%
Conservative	Chas Baily*	1,296	56.6	+12.1
Conservative	Alan Sydney Browne*	1,198		
Conservative	Gill Birch*	1,177		
Labour	Marian Bayle	616	26.9	−3.1
Labour	Alec Keene	615		
Labour	Graham Edward Stuart Vertigen	423		
Green	David Henry Young	376	16.4	+1.9
Turnout			33.0	+2.7
Registered electors		6,335		
Conservative hold		Swing		
Conservative hold		Swing		
Conservative hold		Swing		

=== Harmans Water ===
Harmans Water (3)
Party	Candidate	Votes	%	±%
Conservative	Christopher Richard Martin Turrell*	1,504	69.6	+1.9
Conservative	Shelagh Rosemary Pile*	1,263		
Conservative	Trevor Graham Kensall	1,248		
Labour	Geoff Freeman	430	19.9	−12.4
Labour	Margaret Loneragan	373		
Labour	Clive Temperton	348		
UKIP	Malcolm David Powell	228	10.5	New
Turnout			35.0	+2.4
Registered electors		5,288		
Conservative hold		Swing		
Conservative hold		Swing		
Conservative hold		Swing		

=== Little Sandhurst and Wellington ===
Little Sandhurst and Wellington (2 seats)
Party	Candidate	Votes	%	±%
Conservative	Paul David Bettison*	918	62.1	−7.2
Conservative	Dale Philip Birch*	893		
Liberal Democrats	Stephen Pope	353	23.9	New
Liberal Democrats	John Richard Score	331		
Labour	Jack Delbridge	207	14.0	−16.7
Turnout			36.0	+5.2
Registered electors		4,012		
Conservative hold		Swing		
Conservative hold		Swing		

=== Old Bracknell ===
Old Bracknell (2)
Party	Candidate	Votes	%	±%
Labour	Maureen Beadsley*	672	46.6	+1.7
Labour	Mike Beadsley*	668		
Conservative	Tina McKenzie-Boyle	600	41.6	+1.2
Conservative	Amanda Colette McLean	598		
Liberal Democrats	Lesley Marion Tooze	171	11.9	+2.9
Turnout			36.0	+0.5
Registered electors		4,038		
Labour hold		Swing		
Labour hold		Swing		

=== Owlsmoor ===
Owlsmoor (2)
Party	Candidate	Votes	%	±%
Conservative	David James Worrall*	754	56.0	+9.0
Conservative	Raymond Simonds	716		
Independent	David William Vousden	347	25.8	New
UKIP	George William Barrand	245	18.2	New
Turnout			31.0	+4.4
Registered electors		3,926		
Conservative hold		Swing		
Conservative hold		Swing		

=== Priestwood & Garth ===
Priestwood & Garth (3)
Party	Candidate	Votes	%	±%
Conservative	Jacqui Ryder*	1,020	51.9	+1.4
Conservative	Tony Packham*	968		
Conservative	Alvin Edwin Finch*	962		
Labour	Dennis Good	637	32.4	−5.6
Labour	Janet Keene	572		
Labour	Nisha Tailor	518		
BNP	Andrew McBride	309	15.7	New
Turnout			34.0	−1.6
Registered electors		5,632		
Conservative hold		Swing		
Conservative hold		Swing		
Conservative hold		Swing		

=== Warfield Harvest Ride ===
Warfield Harvest Ride (3)
Party	Candidate	Votes	%	±%
Conservative	Gareth Michael Barnard*	1,443	70.0	+14.6
Conservative	Robert Lauchlan McLean*	1,331		
Conservative	Cliff Thompson*	1,233		
Liberal Democrats	Martyn Jon Towle	355	17.2	−8.5
Labour	Tricia Brown	262	12.7	−6.2
Labour	Marian Langton	231		
Labour	David Warner	187		
Turnout			33.0	+5.3
Registered electors		5,690		
Conservative hold		Swing		
Conservative hold		Swing		
Conservative hold		Swing		

=== Wildridings & Central ===
Wildridings & Central (2)
Party	Candidate	Votes	%	±%
Conservative	Emma Catherine Duncan Barnard*	583	47.7	−6.1
Conservative	Denise Frances Whitbread	574		
Labour	Jim Quinton	294	24.0	−22.2
Liberal Democrats	David James Maxwell	257	21.0	New
Labour	Brian Wilson	251		
Liberal Democrats	Darren Antony Bridgman	214		
UKIP	Bruce Van Biene	89	7.3	New
Turnout			35.0	0.0
Registered electors		3,383		
Conservative hold		Swing		
Conservative hold		Swing		

=== Winkfield & Cranbourne ===
Winkfield & Cranbourne (2)
Party	Candidate	Votes	%	±%
Conservative	Alan Harold Kendall*	844	50.5	−10.5
Conservative	Mary Patricia Ballin*	824		
Independent	Stuart Stanley Tarrant	564	33.8	New
Labour	Tony House	262	15.7	+3.6
Labour	Langdon Jones	229		
Turnout			38.0	+3.1
Registered electors		3,866		
Conservative hold		Swing		
Conservative hold		Swing		

== By-elections ==
=== Hanworth ===
Hanworth By-Election 15 October 2009
Party	Candidate	Votes	%	±%
Conservative	Mark Phillips	640	42.4	−14.2
Labour	Janet Keene	377	25.0	−1.9
Liberal Democrats	Larraine Kerry De Laune	206	13.7	New
UKIP	Jeff Newbold	139	9.2	New
Green	Steven Martin Gabb	77	5.1	−11.3
BNP	David Anthony Penson	70	4.6	New
Majority		263	17.4	
Turnout		1,509	23	
Registered electors		6,446		
Conservative hold		Swing	-8.1	

=== Owlsmoor ===
Owlsmoor By-Election 25 February 2010
Party	Candidate	Votes	%	±%
Conservative	Norman William Bowers	508	54.2	−1.8
Liberal Democrats	Mark James Thompson	238	25.4	New
Labour	Guy Alexander Gillbe	126	13.4	New
Green	Peter Martin Forbes	66	7.0	New
Majority		270	28.8	
Turnout		938	24	
Registered electors		3,938		
Conservative hold		Swing		
