= Bracknell Forest Council =

Local authority in Berkshire, England

- Council logo

Type
- Type: Unitary authority

History
- Founded: 1 April 1974

Leadership
- Mayor: Peter Frewer, Labour since 13 May 2026
- Leader: Helen Purnell, Labour since 25 March 2026
- Chief Executive: Susan Halliwell since 2022

Structure
- Seats: 41 councillors
- Political groups: Administration (20) Labour (20) Other parties (21) Conservative (10) Liberal Democrats (8) Green (3)
- Length of term: 4 years

Elections
- Voting system: Plurality-at-large
- Last election: 4 May 2023
- Next election: 6 May 2027

Meeting place
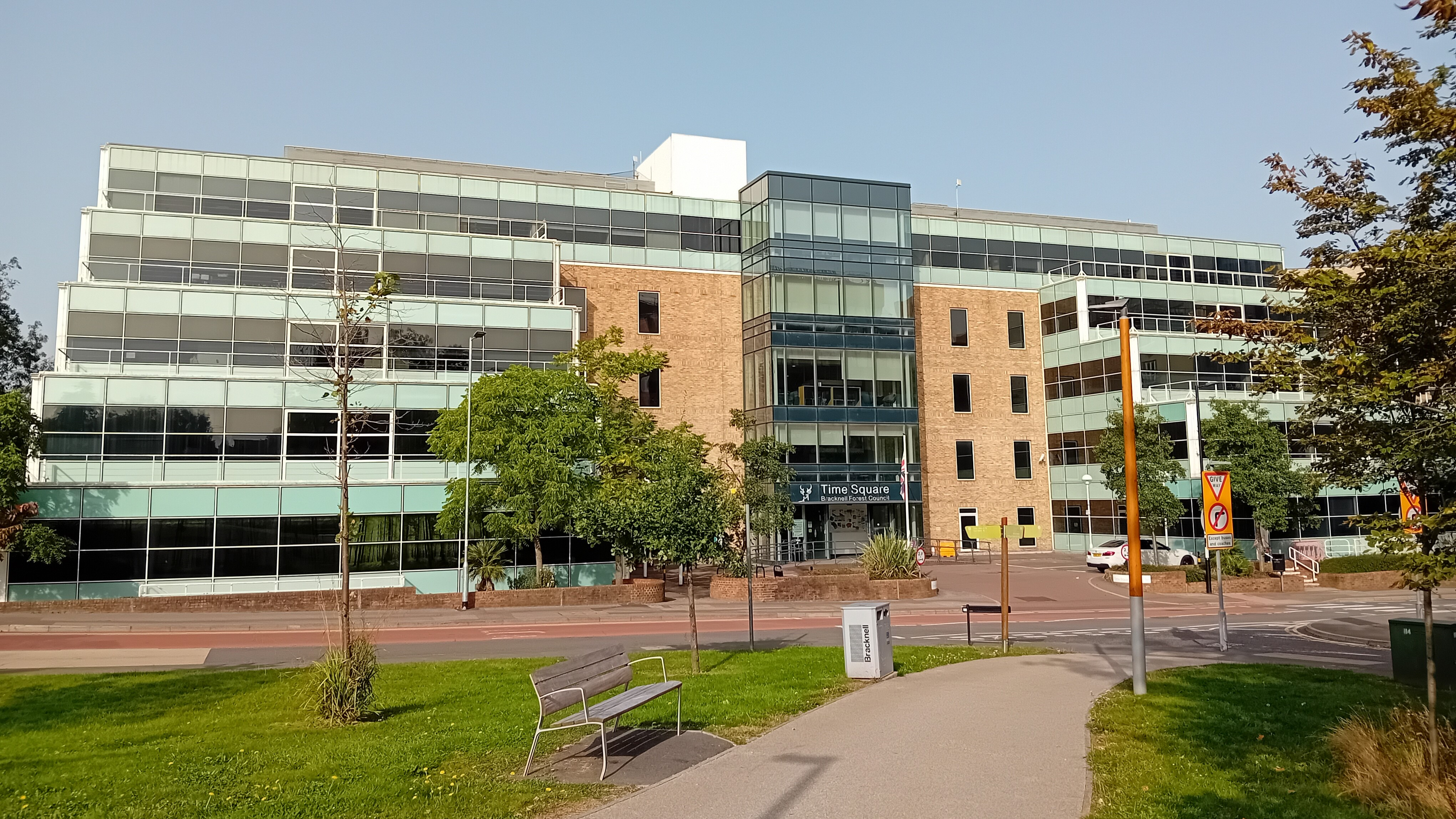
- Time Square, Market Street, Bracknell, RG12 1JD

Website
- www.bracknell-forest.gov.uk

Bracknell Forest Council, also known as Bracknell Forest Borough Council, is the local authority for Bracknell Forest, a local government district with borough status in Berkshire, England. Since 1998, the council has been a unitary authority, being a district council which also performs the functions of a county council. The council has been under no overall control since 2025, being run by a Labour minority administration. It is based at Time Square in Bracknell.

== History ==
The non-metropolitan district of Bracknell was created in 1974 under the Local Government Act 1972, covering the same area as the former Easthampstead Rural District, which had been created in 1894. Bracknell District Council was a lower-tier authority, with Berkshire County Council providing county-level services to the area. In 1988 the district was awarded borough status, allowing the chair of the council to take the title of mayor. The council changed the district's name from Bracknell to Bracknell Forest at the same time, becoming Bracknell Forest Borough Council.

In 1998, Berkshire County Council was abolished and its functions were taken over by the county's six districts, including Bracknell Forest. Berkshire continues to exist as a ceremonial county and a non-metropolitan county, albeit without a county council. The council's full legal name remains Bracknell Forest Borough Council, but it styles itself Bracknell Forest Council.

== Governance ==
The council provides both district-level and county-level functions. The whole borough is covered by civil parishes, which form a second tier of local government for their areas.

=== Political control ===
The council has been under no overall control since 2025, being run by a Labour minority administration. Labour had won a majority of the council's seats at the 2023 election. After two councillors left the Labour group in 2025, the council went under no overall control. The subsequent Labour minority administration was further reduced when the leader of the council, Mary Temperton, and a cabinet member were suspended from the party due to a fundraising scandal.

The first election to the council was held in 1973, initially acting as a shadow authority alongside the outgoing authorities until it came into its powers on 1 April 1974. Political control of the council since 1974 has been as follows:

Lower-tier district council

Party in control	Years
Labour	1974–1976
Conservative	1976–1995
Labour	1995–1997
Conservative	1997–1998

Unitary authority

Party in control	Years
Conservative	1998–2023
Labour	2023–2025
No overall control	2025–present

=== Leadership ===
The role of mayor is largely ceremonial in Bracknell Forest. Political leadership is instead provided by the leader of the council. The leaders since 1984 have been:

Councillor	Party	From	To
Alan Ward	Conservative	1984	May 1992
Bob Angell	Conservative	May 1992	May 1995
Austin McCormack	Labour	May 1995	May 1997
Paul Bettison	Conservative	13 May 1997	May 2023
Mary Temperton	Labour	24 May 2023	3 March 2026
Helen Purnell (Note: Helen Purnell also served as acting leader from 3 March 2026 when Mary Temperton resigned.)	Labour	25 March 2026	

=== Composition ===
Following the 2023 election and subsequent changes to July 2026, the composition of the council was as follows:

Party	Councillors
Labour	20
Conservative	10
Liberal Democrats	8
Green	3
Total	41

The next election is due in 2027.

== Premises ==
The council was originally based at Easthampstead House in Town Square, Bracknell, which had been built in 1970 for its predecessor authority, Easthampstead Rural District Council. In 1997 the council acquired additional office space in a modern building called Time Square on Market Street, Bracknell, with functions split between the two buildings for a time. Council meetings continued to be held at Easthampstead House until a new council chamber was created in Time Square in 2018, after which the council vacated Easthampstead House and is now solely based at Time Square.

== Elections ==
Since the last boundary changes in 2023 the council has comprised 41 councillors representing 15 wards, with each ward electing two or three councillors. Elections are held every four years.
