= 1976 Bracknell District Council election =

1976 local election in Bracknell Forest

← 1973	6 May 1976	1979 →

All 31 seats to Bracknell District Council 16 seats needed for a majority
	First party	Second party	Third party
	Con	Lab	Lib
Leader	Dorothy Benwell	Bill Lindop
Party	Conservative	Labour	Liberal
Leader's seat	Ascot	Wildridings (lost re-election)
Last election	9	17	1
Seats won	27	3	1
Seat change	▲18	▼14	0
Popular vote	11,791	7,217	3,130
Percentage	52.8%	32.3%	14.0%
Swing	▲11.5%	▼15.3%	▲9.4%
	Fourth party	Fifth party
	Res	Ind
Party	Residents	Independent
Last election	3	1
Seats won	0	0
Seat change	▼3	▼1
Popular vote	Did not stand	Did not stand
Council control before election
Labour
Council control after election
Conservative

The 1976 Bracknell District Council election took place on 6 May 1976, to elect all 31 members in 16 wards for Bracknell District Council in England. The election was held on the same day as other local elections as part of the 1976 United Kingdom local elections. The Conservative Party ousted the one-term Labour Party council, winning all but 4 of the seats, with Labour group leader Bill Lindop losing his seat of Wildridings. The Liberal Party were able to hold onto their solitary seat in Crowthorne & Easthampstead. Despite leading the Conservative group into the election, Dorothy Benwell would be replaced by newly elected Tim Wood, who subsequently became leader of the council.

== Summary ==
1976 Bracknell District Council election
Party	Seats	Gains	Losses	Net gain/loss	Seats %	Votes %	Votes	+/−
Conservative	27	▲18	0	▲18	87.1	52.8	11,791	
Labour	3	0	▼14	▼14	9.7	32.3	7,217	
Liberal	1	0	0	0	3.2	14.0	3,130	
Independent Labour	0	0	0	0	0.0	0.8	179	

== Ward results ==
An asterisk (*) denotes an incumbent councillor standing for re-election

=== Ascot ===
Ascot (3)
Party	Candidate	Votes	%	±%
Conservative	Benwell M. Ms.*	1,193	57.4	−6.9
Conservative	Jackson R.	1,077		
Conservative	Evans D.	935		
Liberal	Trower R.	584	28.1	New
Labour	Cripps G. Ms	301	14.5	−21.2
Labour	Tyler J.	291		
Labour	Draper R.	247		
Turnout			52.7	+24.1
Registered electors		3,945		
Conservative hold		Swing		
Conservative hold		Swing		
Conservative hold		Swing		

=== Binfield ===
Binfield
Party	Candidate	Votes	%	±%
Conservative	Lees D. Ms.	801	86.1	+12.9
Labour	Jones E.	129	13.9	−12.9
Turnout			46.8	+20.8
Registered electors		1,994		
Conservative hold		Swing		

=== Bracknell (Great Hollands) ===
Bracknell (Great Hollands) (3)
Party	Candidate	Votes	%	±%
Conservative	Grant J.	1,186	40.4	+13.8
Conservative	Dale E.	1,159		
Conservative	Elford D.	1,123		
Labour	Dellar A.	1,097	37.4	−24.5
Labour	Kirk T. Ms.	1,090		
Labour	Shillcock A. Ms.*	1,087		
Liberal	Malvern K.	471	16.1	New
Liberal	Tottingham D.	451		
Liberal	Stotesbury P.	447		
Independent Labour	Rimple C.	179	6.1	New
Turnout			51.9	+19.8
Registered electors		5,648		
Conservative gain from Labour		Swing		
Conservative gain from Labour		Swing		
Conservative gain from Labour		Swing		

=== Bracknell (Old Bracknell) ===
Bracknell (Old Bracknell) (3)
Party	Candidate	Votes	%	±%
Conservative	Fanthorpe T.	1,148	44.4	+12.2
Conservative	Fleming R.	1,143		
Conservative	Gennery B.	1,141		
Labour	Pearce T.*	1,045	40.4	−6.3
Labour	Mason S.	1,036		
Labour	Wheaton T.	1,002		
Liberal	Campbell R.	392	15.2	−5.8
Liberal	Salisbury R.	389		
Liberal	Maxwell D.	280		
Turnout			46.3	+2.6
Registered electors		5,579		
Conservative gain from Labour		Swing		
Conservative gain from Labour		Swing		
Conservative gain from Labour		Swing		

=== Bullbrook ===
Bullbrook (3)
Party	Candidate	Votes	%	±%
Conservative	Strong P. Ms.	1,264	57.0	+13.7
Conservative	Dowdall C.	1,255		
Conservative	Padley R.	1,225		
Labour	Delbridge J.*	953	43.0	−13.7
Labour	Darke P.	920		
Labour	Checkley A.*	862		
Turnout			43.9	+4.3
Registered electors		5,053		
Conservative gain from Labour		Swing		
Conservative gain from Labour		Swing		
Conservative gain from Labour		Swing		

=== College Town ===
College Town
Party	Candidate	Votes	%	±%
Conservative	Marshall J.* (Note: Marshall was elected as an Independent candidate in 1973.)	470	69.8	New
Labour	Gardener A.	203	30.2	New
Turnout			41.8	N/A
Registered electors		1,713		
Conservative gain from Independent		Swing		

=== Cranbourne ===
Cranbourne
Party	Candidate	Votes	%	±%
Conservative	Creech F.*	325	70.8	+8.0
Labour	Andrews T. Ms.	134	29.2	−8.0
Turnout			41.2	+6.5
Registered electors		1,141		
Conservative hold		Swing		

=== Crowthorne & Easthampstead ===
Crowthorne & Easthampstead (3)
Party	Candidate	Votes	%	±%
Liberal	Brown W.*	1,152	47.3	−52.7
Conservative	Cheney A.	985	40.4	−59.6
Conservative	Finnie J.	935		
Conservative	Worrall D.*	810		
Labour	Hall A.	300	12.3	New
Labour	Johnston S. Ms.	286		
Turnout			55.8	N/A
Registered electors		4,366		
Liberal hold		Swing		
Conservative hold		Swing		
Conservative hold		Swing		

=== Garth ===
Garth (2)
Party	Candidate	Votes	%	±%
Labour	Moylan C.*	659	54.1	−9.3
Labour	Pocknee J.*	645		
Conservative	Brown M.	558	45.9	+9.3
Conservative	Coombs M. Ms.	555		
Turnout			45.5	+11.6
Registered electors		2,674		
Labour hold		Swing		
Labour hold		Swing		

=== Harmanswater ===
Harmanswater (2)
Party	Candidate	Votes	%	±%
Conservative	Wood T.	723	49.9	+15.7
Conservative	Brydon D.	704		
Labour	Smyth G.	518	35.8	−6.6
Labour	Lavender G.*	511		
Liberal	Crean T.	207	14.3	−9.1
Liberal	White P.	197		
Turnout			49.7	+11.3
Registered electors		2,912		
Conservative gain from Labour		Swing		
Conservative gain from Labour		Swing		

=== Little Sandhurst ===
Little Sandhurst (2)
Party	Candidate	Votes	%	±%
Conservative	Steel A.	856	72.1	+35.1
Conservative	Burton J.	773		
Labour	Urqhart C.	332	27.9	+9.0
Labour	Wood R.	283		
Turnout			46.5	+11.0
Registered electors		2,556		
Conservative gain from Residents		Swing		
Conservative gain from Residents		Swing		

=== Priestwood ===
Priestwood (2)
Party	Candidate	Votes	%	±%
Labour	Cain F.*	560	50.4	−8.0
Conservative	Mosses R.	551	49.6	+8.0
Conservative	Harbor P. Ms.	538		
Labour	Mountjoy T.*	534		
Turnout			36.8	+4.2
Registered electors		3,016		
Labour hold		Swing		
Conservative gain from Labour		Swing		

=== Sandhurst ===
Sandhurst
Party	Candidate	Votes	%	±%
Conservative	Rimes G.	537	56.3	+36.6
Labour	Dancy K. Ms.	417	43.7	+5.7
Turnout			51.2	+13.4
Registered electors		1,930		
Conservative gain from Residents		Swing		

=== St. Marys ===
St. Marys
Party	Candidate	Votes	%	±%
Conservative	Rose P.*	371	85.5	+25.5
Labour	Drukker M.	63	14.5	−25.5
Turnout			45.8	+0.6
Registered electors		972		
Conservative hold		Swing		

=== Warfield ===
Warfield
Party	Candidate	Votes	%	±%
Conservative	Kay J. Ms.*	417	73.8	+4.2
Labour	Stewart R.	148	26.2	−4.2
Turnout			45.8	+10.2
Registered electors		1,265		
Conservative hold		Swing		

=== Wildridings ===
Wildridings (2)
Party	Candidate	Votes	%	±%
Conservative	Mattick J.	406	37.3	+5.4
Conservative	Wreglesworth N.	368		
Labour	Lindop W.*	358	32.9	−35.2
Liberal	Mullarky P.	324	29.8	New
Labour	Mihell D.*	320		
Liberal	Spain K.	318		
Turnout			51.2	+12.8
Registered electors		2,123		
Conservative gain from Labour		Swing		
Conservative gain from Labour		Swing		
