= 1971 Easthampstead Rural District Council election =

1971 local election in Easthampstead Rural District

← 1968	11 May 1971	1973 (BDC) →

All 44 seats to Easthampstead Rural District Council 23 seats needed for a majority
	First party	Second party	Third party
	Con	Lab	Ind
Party	Conservative	Labour	Independent
Seats won	21	18	3
	Fourth party
	Lib
Party	Liberal
Seats won	2
Council control before election
Conservative
Council control after election
No overall control

The 1971 Easthampstead Rural District Council election, held on 11 May 1971, was the last election to Easthampstead Rural District Council. The Conservative Party lost overall control, emerging narrowly as the largest party. Concurrent with the changes wrought by the Local Government Act 1972, the council would transition to a new Bracknell District Council, the first election being held in 1973. Until 2023, this would be the last election for a Bracknell-based council where a majority of seats were outside Bracknell town. This is also the last time an election for a Bracknell-based council has ended up in no overall control.

== Ward results ==
=== Binfield ===
Binfield (2)
Party	Candidate	Votes	%	±%
Conservative	Ann Springman	393	80.4	
Conservative	Evelyn Hide	318		
Labour	David Excell	96	19.6	
Labour	Bernard White	68		

=== Garth ===
Garth (3)
Party	Candidate	Votes	%	±%
Labour	William Lindop	549	64.9	
Labour	James Pocknee	537		
Labour	Arthur Wort	510		
Conservative	Gordon Rimes	297	35.1	
Conservative	Peter Harris	296		

=== Great Hollands-Wildridings ===
Great Hollands-Wildridings (3)
Party	Candidate	Votes	%	±%
Labour	Jeananne Shillcock	878	60.1	
Labour	Anthony Mahoney	818		
Labour	Alan Everett	815		
Conservative	David Lamb	583	39.9	
Conservative	Margaret Deacock	491		
Conservative	Herbert Clarke	459		

=== Old Bracknell ===
Old Bracknell (3)
Party	Candidate	Votes	%	±%
Labour	William Harvey	622	57.0	
Labour	Stanley Mason	622		
Labour	Patrick Hoey	608		
Conservative	Bride Kempton	470	43.0	
Conservative	Selwyn Radcliffe	418		
Conservative	Archie Matthews	398		
