= 1979 Bracknell District Council election =

1979 local election in Bracknell Forest

← 1976	3 May 1979	1983 →

All 40 seats to Bracknell District Council 21 seats needed for a majority
	First party	Second party
	Con	Lab
Leader	Donald Brydon	Bill Lindop (Note: Lindop re-entered the council through a 1978 by-election)
Party	Conservative	Labour
Leader's seat	Harmans Water	Garth
Last election	27	3
Seats won	27	10
Seat change	0	▲7
Popular vote	17,622	13,721
Percentage	49.4%	38.4%
Swing	▼3.4%	▲6.1%
	Third party	Fourth party
	Ind	Lib
Party	Independent	Liberal
Last election	0	1
Seats won	3	0
Seat change	▲3	▼1
Popular vote	817	3,542
Percentage	2.3%	9.9%
Swing	N/A	▼4.1%
Council control before election
Conservative
Council control after election
Conservative

The 1979 Bracknell District Council election took place on 3 May 1979, to elect all 40 members in 19 wards for Bracknell Forest Borough Council in England. The election was held on the same day as both the 1979 United Kingdom general election and other local elections as part of the 1979 United Kingdom local elections. Due to a boundary review there had been a change in ward boundaries, along with an increase in size from 31 members elected in 1976. Despite losing government nationally, the Labour Party made up ground in Bracknell District from its landslide defeat in 1976. Although the Conservative Party ended up with the same number of seats as 1976, the increased size of the council saw its majority reduced. The Liberal Party lost its lone seat. This would be the last time a candidate outside the three main parties would win at an all-out election.

== Summary ==
1979 Bracknell District Council election
Party	Seats	Gains	Losses	Net gain/loss	Seats %	Votes %	Votes	+/−
Conservative	27			0		49.4	17,622	-3.4
Labour	10			▲7		38.4	13,721	+6.1
Liberal	0			▼1		9.9	3,542	-4.1
Independent	3			▲3		2.3	817	N/A

== Ward results ==
=== Ascot ===
Ascot (3)
Party	Candidate	Votes	%	±%
Conservative	Benwell D.	Unopposed		
Conservative	Jackson R.	Unopposed		
Independent	Stallybrass W.	Unopposed		
Turnout			N/A	
Registered electors		3,943		
Conservative win (new seat)				
Conservative win (new seat)				
Conservative win (new seat)				

=== Binfield ===
Binfield (2)
Party	Candidate	Votes	%	±%
Conservative	Calvert J.	929	51.3	
Conservative	Hargreaves L.	838		
Liberal	Ellson P. Ms.	536	29.6	
Labour	Clifford J. Ms.	347	19.2	
Labour	Tarry A.	320		
Turnout			83.2	
Registered electors		2,179		
Conservative win (new seat)				
Conservative win (new seat)				

=== Bullbrook ===
Bullbrook (3)
Party	Candidate	Votes	%	±%
Conservative	Coombs M. Ms.	1,937	55.9	
Conservative	Dowdall C.	1,874		
Conservative	Strong P. Ms.	1,815		
Labour	Darke P.	1,528	44.1	
Labour	Ryan V. Ms.	1,388		
Labour	James I.	1,380		
Turnout			69.8	
Registered electors		4,965		
Conservative win (new seat)				
Conservative win (new seat)				
Conservative win (new seat)				

=== College Town ===
College Town (2)
Party	Candidate	Votes	%	±%
Conservative	Ward A.	865	41.3	
Independent	Marshall J. (Note: Marshall was elected as a Conservative Party candidate in 1976)	817	39.0	
Labour	Brierly A.	412	19.7	
Turnout				
Registered electors		1,913		
Conservative win (new seat)				
Independent win (new seat)				

=== Cranbourne ===
Cranbourne
Party	Candidate	Votes	%	±%
Independent	Clarke D.	Unopposed		
Turnout			N/A	
Registered electors		1,119		
Independent win (new seat)				

=== Crowthorne ===
Crowthorne (3)
Party	Candidate	Votes	%	±%
Conservative	Finnie J.	1,893	68.2	
Conservative	Cheney A.	1,866		
Conservative	Newbound B.	1,598		
Labour	Knowles J. Ms.	882	31.8	
Labour	Vertigen G.	703		
Turnout			55.3	
Registered electors		4,184		
Conservative win (new seat)				
Conservative win (new seat)				
Conservative win (new seat)				

=== Garth ===
Garth (2)
Party	Candidate	Votes	%	±%
Labour	Pocknee J.	1,209	53.9	
Labour	Lindop W.	1,174		
Conservative	Powell S. Ms.	1,032	46.1	
Conservative	Parker K.	945		
Turnout			75.1	
Registered electors		2,985		
Labour win (new seat)				
Labour win (new seat)				

=== Great Hollands North ===
Great Hollands North (2)
Party	Candidate	Votes	%	±%
Labour	Shillcock J. Ms.	1,170	45.1	
Labour	Tunnicliffe D.	1,066		
Conservative	Grant J.	852	32.8	
Conservative	Squires J.	764		
Liberal	Malvern K.	574	22.1	
Liberal	Simpson D.	425		
Turnout			79.0	
Registered electors		3,284		
Labour win (new seat)				
Labour win (new seat)				

=== Great Hollands South ===
Great Hollands South (2)
Party	Candidate	Votes	%	±%
Conservative	Dale E.	1,003	48.1	
Conservative	Tubbs D.	996		
Labour	Dellar A.	689	33.0	
Labour	Duncan J.	675		
Liberal	McMahon T.	394	18.9	
Liberal	Jones R.	379		
Turnout			76.4	
Registered electors		2,730		
Conservative win (new seat)				
Conservative win (new seat)				

=== Little Sandhurst ===
Little Sandhurst (2)
Party	Candidate	Votes	%	±%
Conservative	Steel A.	1,443	69.2	
Conservative	Cohen H.	1,265		
Labour	Goddard R.	643	30.8	
Labour	Wood R.	619		
Turnout			76.9	
Registered electors		2,712		
Conservative win (new seat)				
Conservative win (new seat)				

=== Hanworth ===
Hanworth (3)
Party	Candidate	Votes	%	±%
Conservative	Elford D.	1,842	42.4	
Conservative	Martin S. Ms.	1,736		
Conservative	Redman G.	1,716		
Labour	Drukker M.	1,580	36.4	
Labour	Wheaton T.	1,532		
Labour	Sparrow D.	1,529		
Liberal	Balfour A.	923	21.2	
Liberal	Salisbury R.	856		
Turnout			77.7	
Registered electors		5,595		
Conservative win (new seat)				
Conservative win (new seat)				
Conservative win (new seat)				

=== Harmanswater ===
Harmanswater (3)
Party	Candidate	Votes	%	±%
Conservative	Ainscough T.	1,377	51.1	
Conservative	Brydon D.	1,342		
Conservative	Wood T.	1,313		
Labour	Gardener J. Ms.	851	31.6	
Labour	Mihell C.	837		
Labour	Steinborn-Busse K.	619		
Liberal	White P.	466	17.3	
Turnout			77.8	
Registered electors		3,463		
Conservative win (new seat)				
Conservative win (new seat)				
Conservative win (new seat)				

=== Old Bracknell ===
Old Bracknell (3)
Party	Candidate	Votes	%	±%
Labour	Mason S.	1,331	44.7	
Labour	Delbridge J.	1,246		
Labour	Pearce T.	1,240		
Conservative	Dolby D. Ms.	999	33.5	
Conservative	Osborne-Moss D.	874		
Conservative	Morris G.	802		
Liberal	Maxwell D.	649	21.8	
Turnout			78.0	
Registered electors		3,821		
Labour win (new seat)				
Labour win (new seat)				
Labour win (new seat)				

=== Owlsmoor ===
Owlsmoor
Party	Candidate	Votes	%	±%
Conservative	Worrall D.	Unopposed		
Turnout			N/A	
Registered electors		1,289		
Conservative win (new seat)				

=== Priestwood ===
Priestwood (2)
Party	Candidate	Votes	%	±%
Labour	Cain F.	1,304	60.4	
Labour	Mountjoy T.	1,171		
Conservative	Mosses R.	856	39.6	
Conservative	Taber G.	777		
Turnout			75.1	
Registered electors		2,876		
Labour win (new seat)				
Labour win (new seat)				

=== Sandhurst ===
Sandhurst (2)
Party	Candidate	Votes	%	±%
Conservative	Rimes G.	1,015	60.6	
Conservative	Brookes C.	972		
Labour	Dancy K. Ms.	661	39.4	
Labour	Lilly P.	355		
Turnout			77.8	
Registered electors		2,154		
Conservative win (new seat)				
Conservative win (new seat)				

=== St. Marys ===
St. Marys
Party	Candidate	Votes	%	±%
Conservative	Warren J.	Unopposed		
Turnout			N/A	
Registered electors		975		
Conservative win (new seat)				

=== Warfield ===
Warfield
Party	Candidate	Votes	%	±%
Conservative	Kay J. Ms.	685	73.1	
Labour	Stewart R.	252	26.9	
Turnout			70.0	
Registered electors		1,338		
Conservative win (new seat)				

=== Wildridings ===
Wildridings (2)
Party	Candidate	Votes	%	±%
Conservative	Mattick J.	894	50.9	
Labour	Cole C. Ms.	862	49.1	
Conservative	Wreglesworth N.	851		
Labour	Warwick S. Ms.	733		
Turnout			76.4	
Registered electors		2,299		
Conservative win (new seat)				
Labour win (new seat)				
