= 1973 Bracknell District Council election =

1973 local election in Bracknell Forest

← 1971 (ERD)	7 June 1973	1976 →

All 31 seats to Bracknell District Council 16 seats needed for a majority
	First party	Second party	Third party
	Lab	Con	Res
Leader	Bill Lindop
Party	Labour	Conservative	Residents
Seats won	17	9	3
Popular vote	6,395	5,560	704
Percentage	47.6%	41.3%	5.2%
	Fourth party	Fifth party
	Lib	Ind
Party	Liberal	Independent
Seats won	1	1
Popular vote	615	0
Percentage	4.6%	0.0%
Council control before election
Council created
Council control after election
Labour

The 1973 Bracknell District Council election was the first election to the newly formed Bracknell District Council in England, taking place on 7 June 1973 alongside other local elections as part of the 1973 United Kingdom local elections. Its predecessor council was Easthampstead Rural District. For the first time at a local level, the Labour Party gained control. The party benefitted from a reapportionment of seats for Bracknell town - at Easthampstead Rural District's last election in 1971, 21 of the 44 councillors represented Bracknell wards, but this now changed to 17 of 31. With just 29% of the seats, it remained the worst performance for the Conservatives in a Bracknell District or Bracknell Forest election until 2023.

== Summary ==
1973 Bracknell District Council election
Party	Seats	Gains	Losses	Net gain/loss	Seats %	Votes %	Votes	+/−
Labour	17				54.8	47.6	6,395	
Conservative	9				29.0	41.3	5,560	
Residents	3				9.7	5.2	704	
Liberal	1				3.2	4.6	615	
Independent	1				3.2	0.0	0	
Independent Labour	0				0.0	1.3	173	

== Ward results ==
=== Ascot ===
Ascot (3)
Party	Candidate	Votes	%	±%
Conservative	Benwell M. Ms.	727	64.3	
Conservative	Dolan J.	710		
Conservative	Wright C.	679		
Labour	Day J.	403	35.7	
Labour	Holloway A.	396		
Labour	Holloway J. Ms.	389		
Turnout			28.6	
Registered electors		3,955		
Conservative win (new seat)				
Conservative win (new seat)				
Conservative win (new seat)				

=== Binfield ===
Binfield
Party	Candidate	Votes	%	±%
Conservative	Springman A. Ms.	366	73.2	
Labour	Green P.	134	26.8	
Turnout			26.0	
Registered electors		1,924		
Conservative win (new seat)				

=== Bracknell (Great Hollands) ===
Bracknell (Great Hollands) (3)
Party	Candidate	Votes	%	±%
Labour	Shillcock J. Ms.	935	61.9	
Labour	Laing J. Ms.	925		
Labour	Pettitt W.	875		
Conservative	Clarke H.	402	26.6	
Conservative	Clarke D. Ms.	392		
Conservative	Corley M.	374		
Independent Labour	Everett A.	173	11.5	
Turnout			32.1	
Registered electors		4,697		
Labour win (new seat)				
Labour win (new seat)				
Labour win (new seat)				

=== Bracknell (Old Bracknell) ===
Bracknell (Old Bracknell) (3)
Party	Candidate	Votes	%	±%
Labour	Dhillon R.	788	46.7	
Labour	McShane D.	788		
Labour	Pearce T.	757		
Conservative	Kempton D. Ms.	544	32.2	
Conservative	Hasted W.	524		
Conservative	Rugman C.	489		
Liberal	Hoskins K.	355	21.0	
Turnout			43.7	
Registered electors		3,862		
Labour win (new seat)				
Labour win (new seat)				
Labour win (new seat)				

=== Bullbrook ===
Bullbrook (3)
Party	Candidate	Votes	%	±%
Labour	Delbridge J.	1,078	56.7	
Labour	Walsh M.	1,022		
Labour	Checkley A.	991		
Conservative	Coombs M. Ms.	822	43.3	
Conservative	Strong P. Ms.	822		
Conservative	Thompson E.	782		
Turnout			39.6	
Registered electors		4,793		
Labour win (new seat)				
Labour win (new seat)				
Labour win (new seat)				

=== College Town ===
College Town
Party	Candidate	Votes	%	±%
Independent	Marshall J.	Unopposed	N/A	
Turnout			N/A	
Registered electors		1,696		
Independent win (new seat)				

=== Cranbourne ===
Cranbourne
Party	Candidate	Votes	%	±%
Conservative	Creech F.	284	62.8	
Labour	Turiccki M. Ms.	168	37.2	
Turnout			34.7	
Registered electors		1,301		
Conservative win (new seat)				

=== Crowthorne & Easthampstead ===
Crowthorne & Easthampstead (3)
Party	Candidate	Votes	%	±%
Liberal	Brown W.	Unopposed	N/A	
Conservative	Offord J.	Unopposed	N/A	
Conservative	Worrall D.	Unopposed		
Turnout			N/A	
Registered electors		4,203		
Liberal win (new seat)				
Conservative win (new seat)				
Conservative win (new seat)				

=== Garth ===
Garth (2)
Party	Candidate	Votes	%	±%
Labour	Moylan C.	564	63.4	
Labour	Pocknee J.	517		
Conservative	Harbor P. Ms.	325	36.6	
Turnout			33.9	
Registered electors		2,620		
Labour win (new seat)				
Labour win (new seat)				

=== Harmanswater ===
Harmanswater (2)
Party	Candidate	Votes	%	±%
Labour	Pinder W.	471	42.4	
Labour	Lavender G.	456		
Conservative	Underwood R.	380	34.2	
Conservative	Wood T.	367		
Liberal	Banks M. Ms.	260	23.4	
Liberal	White P.	249		
Turnout			38.4	
Registered electors		2,896		
Labour win (new seat)				
Labour win (new seat)				

=== Little Sandhurst ===
Little Sandhurst (2)
Party	Candidate	Votes	%	±%
Residents	Carruthers G.	405	44.1	
Residents	Yearsden J.	372		
Conservative	Steele A.	340	37.0	
Conservative	Rimes G.	202		
Labour	Crew R.	174	18.9	
Labour	Kinsella J.	98		
Turnout			35.5	
Registered electors		2,586		
Residents win (new seat)				
Residents win (new seat)				

=== Priestwood ===
Priestwood (2)
Party	Candidate	Votes	%	±%
Labour	Cain F.	564	58.4	
Labour	Mountjoy T.	541		
Conservative	Clark-Lowes F.	401	41.6	
Conservative	Mosses R.	370		
Turnout			32.6	
Registered electors		2,963		
Labour win (new seat)				
Labour win (new seat)				

=== Sandhurst ===
Sandhurst
Party	Candidate	Votes	%	±%
Residents	Harris K.	299	42.3	
Labour	Dancy K. Ms.	269	38.0	
Conservative	Pierce J.	139	19.7	
Turnout			37.8	
Registered electors		1,872		
Residents win (new seat)				

=== St. Marys ===
St. Marys
Party	Candidate	Votes	%	±%
Conservative	Rose P.	265	60.0	
Labour	Treffry R.	177	40.0	
Turnout			45.2	
Registered electors		978		
Conservative win (new seat)				

=== Warfield ===
Warfield
Party	Candidate	Votes	%	±%
Conservative	Kay J. Ms.	316	69.6	
Labour	Stewart D.	138	30.4	
Turnout			35.6	
Registered electors		1,277		
Conservative win (new seat)				

=== Wildridings ===
Wildridings (2)
Party	Candidate	Votes	%	±%
Labour	Lindop W.	532	68.1	
Labour	Mihell D.	512		
Conservative	Read B.	249	31.9	
Conservative	Toomey J.	246		
Turnout			38.4	
Registered electors		2,036		
Labour win (new seat)				
Labour win (new seat)				
